= Cinema of Hungary =

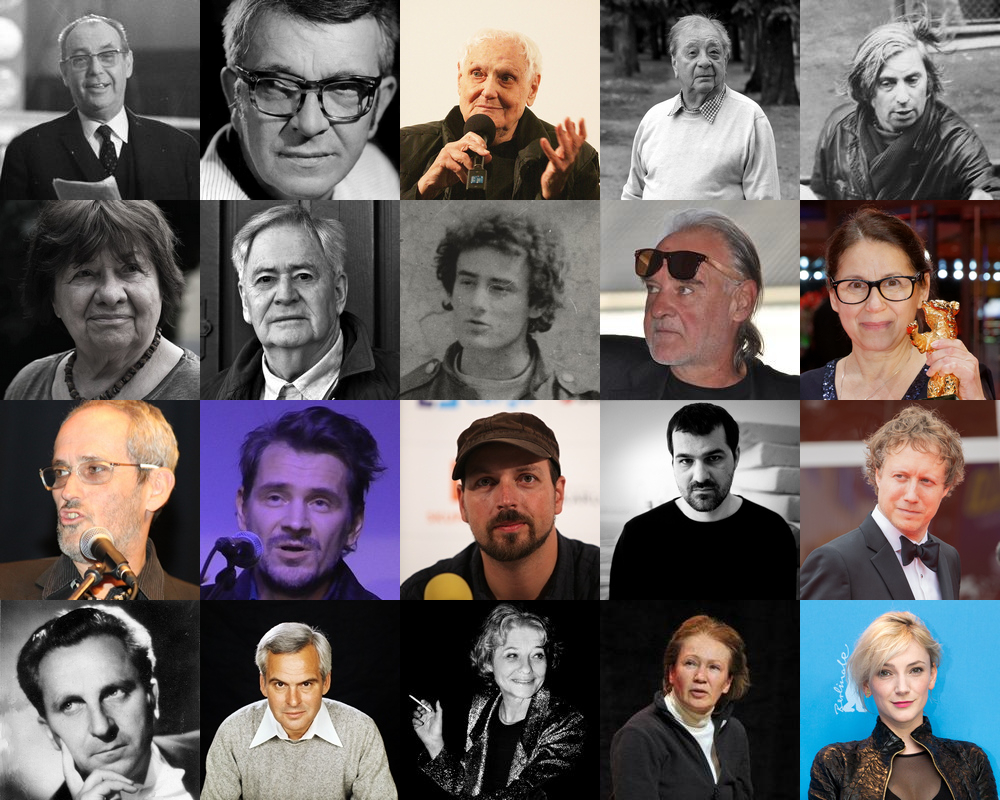
- Montage of Hungarian filmmakers and actors (Note: From top left to bottom right: Zoltán Várkonyi, Zoltán Fábri, Miklós Jancsó, Károly Makk, Péter Bacsó, Márta Mészáros, István Szabó, Gábor Bódy, Béla Tarr, Ildikó Enyedi, János Szász, Szabolcs Hajdu, György Pálfi, Kornél Mundruczó, László Nemes, Antal Páger, Zoltán Latinovits, Mari Törőcsik, Dorottya Udvaros and Alexandra Borbély)
- No. of screens: 422 (2025)
  - Per capita: 2 per 100,000 (2025)
- Main distributors: Intercom 18.0% Forum Hungary 12.0% Cirko Gejzír 10.0%

Produced feature films (2025)
- Total: 42

Number of admissions (2025)
- Total: 10,611,000
  - Per capita: 1.12 (2024)
- National films: 1,973,646 (18.6%)

Gross box office (2024)
- Total: HUF 24.5 billion (~€64.25 million)

Hungary has had a cinema industry since the beginning of the 20th century including Hungarians within and beyond the country's borders. Directors include István Szabó, Béla Tarr, and Miklós Jancsó. Producer William Fox and Adolph Zukor, the founders of Fox Studios and Paramount Pictures respectively, and Alexander Korda, who played a leading role in the early period of British cinema had Hungarian roots. Examples of successful Hungarian films include Merry-go-round, Mephisto, Werckmeister Harmonies and Kontroll.

== History ==
=== The early decades ===
==== 1896–1901 ====
Hungarian cinema began in 1896, when the first screening of the films of the Lumière Brothers was held on the 10th of May in the cafe of the Royal Hotel of Budapest. In June of the same year, Arnold and Zsigmond Sziklai opened the first Hungarian movie theatre on 41 Andrássy Street named the Okonograph, where they screened Lumière films using French machinery. The inhabitants of the elite neighborhood were opposed to this new form of entertainment, and the theatre soon closed. But film screenings in cafés, the centers of Budapest's public life, were becoming more and more widespread, and by 1911, over 100 movie theater operated in the capital.

The first film shooting took place also in 1896, recording the festivities of the Millennium Celebration. Employees of the Lumiéres recorded the march at the Buda Castle. The first Hungarian cameraman was Zsigmond Sziklai.

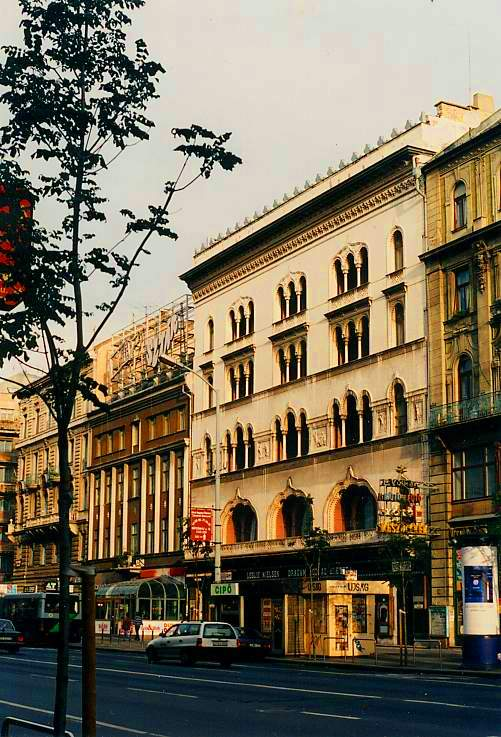
Uránia Scientific Theatre

The first consciously made Hungarian film was 'A Tánc' (The Dance) directed by Béla Zsitkovszky, made for one of the shows at the Uránia Scientific Theatre. Gyula Pekár asked for a moving picture from Béla Zsitovszky, the projectionist of the Uránia. Zsitovszky, originally an optician, shot the picture on the roof terrace of the theatre with renowned actors and ballerinas of the Operaház Theatre. The 24 cinematographic short-films were premiered on 30 April 1901.

==== 1901–1920 ====
The infrastructure of the Hungarian cinema scene was built up during the first decade of the 20th century. By 1910, 270 permanent theatres operated in the country, including large capacity film palaces like the Royal Apollo. Film distribution was organized by the end of the decade. The first company to lend the film-shooting apparatus was the Projectograph, founded by Mór Ungerleider in 1908. The company also shot films, offering documentaries and newsreels, advancing the country's film industry.

The literary and artistic scene enthusiastically supported the new form of expression. Writers of the Nyugat circle saw filmmaking as a sign of closing up to modern European Literature and became avid movie theatergoers. Frigyes Karinthy even became a dramaturg to Alexander Korda, the first prominent director and movie critic.

As early critics found most of the films vulgar, boring, and frivolous, film-makers stressed the informative, educational virtues of the technology as pushed by the Hunnia Studio, founded in 1911, formed as an offshoot of the Vígszínház theatre.

A characteristic style of early Hungarian cinema was the cinema sketch, a hybrid form of theatre and film. Each short projection was followed or interrupted by live stage actors, often acting their own characters from the screen. The genre inspired many prominent writers of the time, including Ferenc Molnár and Karinthy. Comedians also used this form often to perform various jokes and scenes utilizing its hybrid nature, one well-known performer being Gyula Gózon.

Mór Undergleider started a professional journal on the subject of cinema, called Mozgófénykép Híradó (News of Moving Picture). The journal published articles of numerous renowned writers, theatrical directors, aestheticans, and scientists, including the pioneering film-theory articles of the 18-year-old Alexander Korda. However, the theoretical forebodings and possibilities outlined in Mozgófénykép Híradó were not realized later on by the country's slowly unfolding film production.

From March to August of 1919, under the short-lived Hungarian Soviet Republic, the Hungarian cinema industry was the first one to be fully nationalized. The journal Vörös Film (Red film) was established to popularize the shift. Some filmmakers welcomed the change, as the government provided protection against competing for foreign movies.

=== Interwar period ===
==== 1920–1931 ====
The aftermath of the First World War left the sprouting Hungarian movie industry in ruins. Native experts of the field, like directors Michael Curtiz or Alexander Korda left the country during or after the disarray, often making significant career abroad, like in Hollywood. During the twenties, foreign (mostly American) companies made use of the economical crisis by gaining hold of nearly all of the country's theatres. French, American, and Italian movies that had been banned during the war were all over Hungarian screens, leaving little ground for Hungarian productions. The few companies that operated at the time, like the Corvina Studio, drifted towards bankruptcy.

The downfall was avoided largely by government support and protective laws. 1925 saw the creation of the Hungarian Movie Industry Fund, and a new law forced distributors to finance a Hungarian movie after every 30 imported ones. Theatres were forced to air the newsreels created by the Office of Hungarian Film. In 1929 the government of István Bethlen began to tax imported movies (enriching the Industry Fund), but the fee was significantly lowered for companies that produced Hungarian movies; even a short movie was awarded 20 tax-free film imports.

The Movie Industry Fund bought the bankrupt Corvina Studio in 1927, founding the Hunnia Movie Company with the intention to produce full-length feature films. The studio became the cornerstone for professionals in the following years. Its mission became difficult with the economic crisis of 1929 and the spreading of costly sound film, needing further investments.

The movie-producing scene slowly emerged again, marked by the start of journal Filmkultúra edited by Andor Lajtha in 1928. Newer technology from Vienna started appearing, leaving room for innovation: with the Projektophone, Dénes Mihály became one of the many inventors of loud film, but he was unable to sell the patent. During the shooting of Csak egy kislány van a világon, crew members were able to borrow equipment from Fox Movietone News, whose employees worked in Budapest that day, recording a few musical and speaking scenes. While the movie was one of the last silent ones, it also became the first to use voice. The first voiced movie screening was held on 30 September 1929 in the Puskin Theater, presenting the American film The Singing Fool). Voiced, speaking scenes were inserted in more and more films, like in Mihály Kertész's Noah's Ark, which featured a narrated introduction. The first full-length film with sound was Hunnia Film Studio's 1931 movie Kék Bálvány.

Because of its reputedly alien American storyline and setting Kék Bálvány was only a mild success, unlike Hyppolit, a lakáj, which premiered only two months later, and became the first box office hit, as well as one of the most successful and well-known motion pictures of the country. Directed by István Székely, who was called back from Berlin for the job, the movie's comedic tone and bourgeois setting became a standard for native film production in the following ten years. Actors like Pál Jávor and Gyula Kabos became sought-after performers, appearing in nearly every major production of the decade. As sound film enabled more natural performances, popular stage actors became more attracted to the big screen, however, many of them could not adapt to the different working conditions, or to the new phenomena of the 'filmstar,' a life with pressure from the media and fans.

==== 1932–1945 ====
By 1932, over 500 theatres operated in the country, a quarter of them located in Budapest. Support for sound playback was spreading, with around half of the venues owning the needed devices. The maximum timeframe of the shooting was 12 days, after which the producing company fined the director for each additional day. After the problems of the 1920s, Hungarian film production boomed in the 1930s, rising from 6 films in 1932 to a peak of 36 in 1937.

From 1935 onwards, far-right-wing groups were formed throughout the country. They criticized the movie industry as being "infested with Jews" and its products "containing obscene, unmoral content". The number of protests were increasing, and premiers were disrupted, like in the case of Lovagias Ügy. As Horthy's government formed increasingly closer ties with Nazi Germany, the press also started to put pressure on Jewish cast members. Article XV., the first "Jew law" introduced in 1938, enforced a 6% maximum on Jews in the Film Guild. Later anti-semitic laws restricted Jews from being directors, performers, screenwriters or managers of film studios, film distribution companies, and theatres. This made work nearly impossible for a large number of film-makers and actors, and many of them, like Gyula Kabos, fled the country. The Second World War slowly showed its signs in the country with an increasing number of air raids and bombings, making film production extremely difficult. In the final years of the war, only a handful of movies were made, most of them being slap-dash works. During the war, movie theatres did not play American and Soviet features, so industry professionals and selected audiences could watch films like Gone with the Wind only at small, hidden, makeshift screenings for high prices.

==== 1945–1947 ====
The War had caused huge damage to industry property, but production work resumed relatively early, in 1945. Three movies were produced that year, the most prominent of these new ventures being Márton Keleti's A Tanítónő. They attempted to resurrect the production and story mechanisms of pre-war cinema, with private investments and old story schemes, but their failure seemed to prove that audience needs were changed and the small number of new cinemas will not provide enough revenue. The private sector slowly backed off from film production, resulting in no Hungarian films being made in 1946. Work resumed in 1947, with the government proposing a 200.000 Ft aid to film-producing companies (the average budget of a movie being 500.000 Ft). Companies were started, but most of them were backed by political forces. Mezei próféta was financed by the Peasant Party, Könnyű múzsa by the Independent Smallholders' Party, Valahol Európában by the Communist Party, and Beszterce ostroma by the Social Democratic Party. Signaling the fierce situation, many of these movies were banned, causing moral and financial loss to targeted factions.

Most of the films from this transitional period continued the tradition of literary adaptations, but a number of them tried to introduce some sort of social criticism. Two notable pictures were the realist Valahol Európában by Géza Radványi and Ének a búzamezőkről by István Szőts. The latter movie had a smaller influence on the industry as it was banned in 1948 until the seventies.

21 March 1948 became a turning point for cinema production as the state began to nationalize certain parts of the industry, with several further steps in 1948–49 resulting in a total takeover.

=== Film in the socialist era ===
==== 1948–1950 ====
After the communist nationalization, the only company allowed to produce feature films was the Hungarian National Filmmaking Company, while newsreels and documentary production was managed by the News and Documentary Film Company, and distribution through MOKÉP. Control over film production was centralized and authorities specified story themes and setting. Scripts were often rewritten multiple times to secure the transmission of ideological messages. The nationalization solved the long-running problem of funding, the government's resources allowing for technically more complex, big-budget movies.

The first product of the nationalized industry was Frigyes Bán's Talpalatnyi föld, continuing the tradition of films that showed a more realistic country life with the help of folk literature. However, ideological content was still present. Films of 1948–49 – while varying in genre, a change that was welcomed after the mostly comedic approach of the thirties – aimed to show the sins of the past, and how they would change under the new socialist rule.

By 1950, the film industry was under total government control, plans for new movies were only issued by central command (with themes like "socialist conversion of the agriculture", or "exposing enemy sabotage".) The films were issued to be directed by industry veterans who started their career in the 1930-40s, like Frigyes Bán or Márton Keleti, even while they were politically not to be trusted. Young directors could only work on dramaturgic jobs. Films with contemporary settings became more frequent, with the intention to be storied guides to explain communist morale, and to warn about its enemies. Manufacturing movies depicted the labor heroes of factory production or on the fields, showcasing the ideal worker (Első fecskék, Ütközet békében, Tűzkeresztség). Sabotage movies showed a reactionary figure from the old regime, often an engineer or an intellectual, who works as an agent to sabotage production, sometimes collaborating with western forces. While their first attempt is successful, an investigation by wise party members uncovers the conspiracy (Teljes gőzzel, Becsület és dicsőség, Civil a pályán). Both types utilized traditional tools of filmmaking, with either comedic or musical elements to show the joys of physical labor, or elements of detective stories to show sabotage. Historical films were also present, showing revolutionary ages that authorities felt to be parallel to contemporary events (like Föltámadott a tenger – the Hungarian Revolution of 1848, Rákóczi hadnagya – the peasant uprising led by Ferenc Rákóczi).

==== 1953–1956 ====
Beginning in 1953, slight attempts of democratization began in film production. The script became subservient to directorial work, giving chances to young talents (Károly Makk, János Herkó). Political messages were toned down, with manufacturing movies converting into real comedies with only marginal political elements (Állami áruház, 2x2 néha öt), and sabotage movies turning into disaster films, showing more realistic threats to production (natural disaster or human negligence) that requires the collaboration of a community. Socially critical works began to appear, both in drama (Keserű igazság) and comedic (Két emelet boldogság) form.

Fuelled by proper funding and the easing political climate, 1954–56 were the beginning years for cinema as an art form in Hungary. The two most influential director of the era were Zoltán Fábri and Félix Máriássy. While Fábri operated with a dramatic-expressionist style that placed protagonists into extreme situations to face basic moral questions (Körhinta, Hannibál tanár úr), Máriássy used a lyric, and strongly realistic tone, depicting events with high detail (Budapesti tavasz, Egy pikoló világos). Another important director was Károly Makk, whose films, ranging from satirical comedy (Mese a 12 találatról) to expressionistic social drama (Ház a sziklák alatt) represented the increasingly diversifying nature of the decade's film production.

==== 1956–1960 ====
The reprisal following the revolution of 1956 affected the movie's world severely, several films were banned, while many industry experts and actors left the country. Decentralization of the country's film production was halted, the planned reorganization became superficial, with the Hungarian National Filmmaking Company regaining its name of Hunnia Film Studio, and the News and Documentary Film Company were renamed to Budapest Film Studio. The latter also received permission to produce feature films, and while its budget and machinery were not ready for this task for a few following years, it provided a breeding ground for a number of young talents, like Miklós Jancsó. Political influences regained their place in production, so directors stayed away from contemporary or socially critical themes. Most of the films were set between the two World Wars, many of them being literary adaptations. Adopting novels from writers like Kálmán Mikszáth or Sándor Tatay, they showed the detailed lifestyle of peasants and the common man in a moderately realistic fashion.

==== 1960–1970 ====
The sixties were the years of rejuvenation for the Hungarian movie industry. After the harsher years following the events of 1956, the newly elected socialist government, headed by János Kádár wanted to appear more liberal, resulting in softening rules and regulations in every area. The two former film studios were split into four independent ones, headed by film-makers. These artistic teams could approve or deny filming plans themselves; supervision was only present in the form of pre-screening of the finished movie. Instead of multiple stages of control over scripts and plans, the censoring became a posterior process. Only a low number of films became censored, not only because the government's intention to maintain a more broad-minded image, but because directors also tried to avoid more problematic themes. Socially critical films, often utilizing cross-talk and allegorical elements, re-emerged, and many of them were allowed to be screened at western film festivals.

As technology became cheap, large masses of people became introduced to this form of entertainment. In the countryside, clubs and community houses were converted to screening rooms, while in towns, and especially Budapest, hundreds of new movie theatres opened. Ticket price for premiere movies was 8 Ft, and 2 Ft for older films or in worker district – a cost that nearly every class could pay. With short animations and newsreels playing before and after feature films, movie-going became a several-hour-long entertainment. Special theatres operated to only show children's movies or newsreels (a ticket was valid for 30 minutes).

The founding of Balázs Béla Studio was another important step in the reshaping of the industry. While the studio had only a small budget, movies made here did not need to be pre-screened to external reviewers, only the ones intended for larger audiences. Young professionals finishing university got a chance to quickly join live production. The studio became the main workshop for avant-garde and experimental filming, contributing greatly to the generational change of the sixties. Art groups with different characteristics were formed.

The era's filming was largely influenced by western modernism, but similarly to Czechoslovak and Polish cinema, new elements and styles were rarely present in their pure form, but rather mixed with cultural, historical and political themes. For example, the rebellious, youth-centered French New Wave served as an inspiration for István Szabó's early works, like Álmodozások kora or Szerelmesfilm, which used non-linear narration and experimental camera work. But in both cases, youth themes were combined with other themes like history or the clash of generations.

Against the trends of earlier decades, the positive intellectual appeared as a new type of character, full with optimism and ideas, battling not only with political barriers, but with bureaucracy, and the old generation's rigid rules and positions (Falak, Szemüvegesek, Megszállottak). Intellectuals became personified, with such characters often reflecting on their own situation in long, moralizing dialogue scenes.

The demand for presenting rural life reappeared, but such films were produced with the world-view of the new generation. Protagonists looked at peasant life as a thing of the past, and while they respected old morals and were nostalgic, they were critical about not only the social relations of past decades, but the general helplessness of their predecessors, dismaying their submission and lack of revolt. Reckoning with the past and parentage were the themes of numerous movies of the decade (Oldás és kötés, Feldobott kő, Tízezer nap). Instead of the ballad-like, detailed rendering of country life, new directors used more stylized methods. The theme of generational conflict appears in more light-hearted, entertaining forms in the second half of the decade, often in collaboration with popular pop-bands (Ezek a fiatalok, Szerelmes biciklisták). Directors from the old generation also dealt with themes that looked at the past, and while omitting the element of conflicting generations, they too explored the question of individual destiny and history, historical determination, and moral decisions in such cases (Párbeszéd, Húsz óra, Hideg napok), often utilizing modernistic tools like paralleling viewpoints and interpretations.

The sixties was not only the decade of modernist film but the starting era of distinctive directorial filmmaking. This can also be observed in Hungary. After his debut films, Így jöttem and Szegénylegények were the first movies where Miklós Jancsó's trademark visual style – long, slow cuts and horizontal camera movement – appear. István Szabó directed his most personal movies during this time, pairing subjectivity with first-person narration. After 1956's Professor Hannibal, Zoltán Fábri further elaborates the theme of moral choice in historical times in many of his films from the 1960s, like Isten hozta, őrnagy úr!, Két félidő a pokolban, Nappali sötétség. After trying several genres, the cinema of Károly Makk becomes more unified, creating the most political, dramatic films of his career during the era, with Megszállottak, Elveszett paradicsom, Az utolsó előtti ember.

Art and entertainment films became more separated, with the latter going through a similar renewal, seeking new genres and actors. The most popular films were Zoltán Várkonyi's adaptations of Mór Jókai novels (A kőszívű ember fiai, Egy magyar nábob, Kárpáti Zoltán) and Márton Keleti's comedies (Butaságom története, A tizedes meg a többiek). Disaster movies of the fifties were replaced by action films, detective stories (A hamis Izabella, A gyilkos a házban van) and spy movies (Foto Háber, Fény a redőny mögött). Meant to carry on the tradition of cabaret/comedy films of the past, satirical comedy films appeared, often starring the popular László Kabos (A veréb is madár).

The end of the decade saw another wave of censorial strictness, so film productions turned from political, revolting themes towards the private sphere, often utilizing stylized, lyrical motifs, producing so-called aestheticizing films.

==== 1970–1980 ====
Both the objective and subjective form of the Hungarian film, developed in the sixties, went through the process of stylization in the seventies. Objective films try to compose a closer, sociological description of social processes (marked by the trend of documentarism), the subjective, overstepping biographical elements, try to stress the individual side of its form (marked by the slightly pejorative term aestheticism). In both cases, the classical forms of narration fell into the background, and parallel to the loosening of the story, pictorial effects were strengthened, often using allegorization.

The two definitive trends of the seventies became the documentarism, meant to introduce a new aspect and change in form, and, continuing from the sixties, the directorial films. Other contemporary genres and forms, like grotesque, satire, or the so-called state-of-the-generation films can all be connected to them.

The most influential trend of the decade was documentarism, creating the genre of fictional documentary (or documentary feature films), a genre regarded as distinctively Hungarian (Budapest school). Short and full-length documentaries created in the Balázs Béla Studio from the end of the sixties had a major influence on its creation. As film producers of the seventies were dissatisfied with the illusion of realism of the previous years, they felt that conventional acting and dramatics no longer offered new possibilities. Many of the era's influential films include, or try to surpass documentarism, by distancing from realist depiction in building up unconventional scenes. In these films (including András Jeles's Little Valentino), the sociologically accurate world becomes transparent, and by exposing documentarism, a peculiar cinematic language is revealed. By the end of the decade, documentarist stylization decoupled into a lyrical, or sometimes grotesque version utilized in feature films (like of Judit Elek, Ferenc Grunwalsky, Lívia Gyarmathy, Géza Böszörményi) and an experimental line, marked by BB Studio's Filmnyelvi Sorozat, and films of the K/3 Group, led by Gábor Bódy.

Most of the films made in the BB Studio and on the Academy used cinéma verité as a method to reveal socially sensitive themes, but unlike the outer, intellectual standpoint of the sixties, they explored the inner conflicts of their subjects.

The era's mainstream was also created along the lines of the more artistic documentarist films, in the form of state-of-the-generation movies. While in part continuing the tradition of public life movies of the sixties, they incorporated the changed social attitudes of the seventies.

==== 1980–1990 ====
Márta Mészáros is best known for her film Diary for My Children (1984), which won the Grand-Prix Award at the Cannes Film Festival and is the first film in a trilogy of autobiographical films that also includes Diary for My Lovers (1987) and Diary for My Mother and Father (1990).

=== 1990-today ===
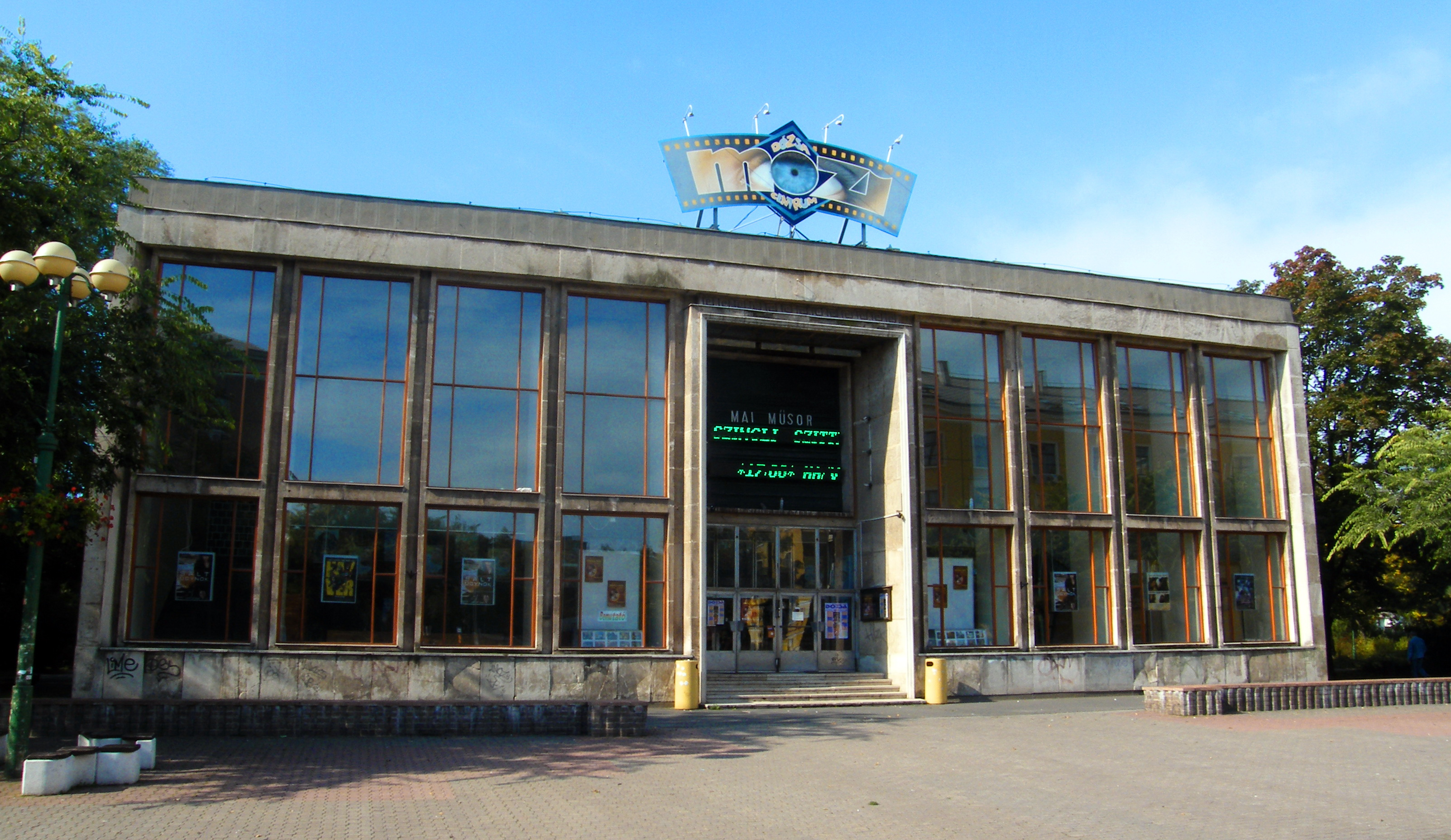
A Cinema in Dunaújváros

==== Films ====
- Hungarian Requiem (1991)
- Sátántangó (1994)
- The Gambler (1997)
- Ein Lied von Liebe und Tod (1999), a German / Hungarian film inspired by the song "Gloomy Sunday"
- Werckmeister Harmonies (2000)
- Abandoned (2001)
- I Love Budapest (2001)
- Hukkle (2002)
- Pleasant Days (2002)
- A Long Weekend in Pest And Buda (2003)
- Kontroll (2003)
- The District! (2004)
- Fateless (2005)
- Just Sex and Nothing Else (2005)
- Children of Glory (2006)
- Johanna (2006)
- Rokonok (2006)
- Taxidermia (2006)
- Chameleon (Kaméleon) (2008)
- Delta (2008)
- The Man from London (2008)
- Katalin Varga (2009)
- The Turin Horse (2011)
- The Maiden Danced to Death (2011)
- Son of Saul (2015)
- Kincsem (2017)
- On Body and Soul (2017)

==== Directors ====
- Nimród Antal
- Béla Tarr
- György Pálfi
- Ildikó Enyedi
- István Szabó
- Károly Makk
- Lajos Koltai
- Márta Mészáros
- Miklós Jancsó
- Endre Hules
- Can Togay
- László Nemes

==== Academy Award nominees/winners ====
- Attila Szalay (with two others) technical AA-award for SpaceCam 1996 (?)
- Lajos Koltai AA-nomination for Best Cinematography (2000) for Malena
- Géza M.Tóth AA-nomination (2007) for Best Short Film, animation: "Maestro"(2005)
- Márk Jászberényi, Tamás Perlaki and Gyula Priskin: Scientific Academy Award (2010) for development of software
- László Nemes winning the award for best foreign-language film (2016) with Son of Saul.
- Ildikó Enyedi AA-nomination (2018) for best foreign-language film with On Body and Soul.
- "Lustre", a color correcting system that enables real-time manipulation during digital intermediate process. Scientific Academy Award (2014) was given for Mud box shared by five persons of whom three were Hungarians: Tibor Madjar for the concept and Csaba Kőhegyi and Imre Major for the design.

== Cinema theatre operations ==
Statistical datas about cinema theatres in Hungary (1990–2025)
Year	No. of theatres	No. of screens	No. of seats	Admission (in millions)	No. of local feature film premier	Local movie share (%)
1990	1 960	–	344 758	36.22	31	5.2
1991	1 025	–	–	21.75	19	4.0
1992	678	–	–	15.22	25	5.5
1993	635	–	–	14.79	19	3.7
1994	592	–	–	15.91	20	1.8
1995	597	–	–	14.04	9	2.3
1996	558	–	–	13.28	19	6.0
1997	594	–	–	16.57	16	8.8
1998	628	–	–	14.57	13	5.6
1999	604	–	–	14.07	16	3.7
2000	–	564	109 234	14.29	22	8.7
2001	–	622	134 003	15.70	23	6.3
2002	–	605	131 046	15.27	19	8.5
2003	–	580	124 860	13.65	21	4.9
2004	–	531	112 723	13.60	28	10.3
2005	–	466	96 170	12.09	17	13.8
2006	–	407	82 013	11.63	25	16.9
2007	–	400	78 955	10.91	28	10.9
2008	–	418	81 191	11.68	22	9.2
2009	–	408	78 789	10.70	24	9.1
2010	–	411	76 667	11.11	25	4.7
2011	–	–	–	–	–	–
2012	–	–	–	–	–	–
2013	–	–	–	–	–	–
2014	105	329	58 144	10.33	39	5.2
2015	122	355	63 232	12.51	22	4.6
2016	164	402	72 304	14.29	26	3.8
2017	178	417	76 480	14.64	35	10.2
2018	177	421	73 315	15.47	32	7.6
2019	181	428	74 932	15.11	32	5.3
2020	162	406	72 379	4.32	35	7.4
2021	144	397	68 369	6.18	45	9.9
2022	151	407	68 637	10.18	52	6.0
2023	152	422	71 122	11.20	47	6.5
2024	151	419	70 220	10.73	47	14.5
2025	152	422	71 009	10.61	42	18.6

== See also ==
- List of Hungarian submissions for the Academy Award for Best International Feature Film
- Budapest Twelve - a list of Hungarian films considered the best
- Cinema of the world
- Culture of Hungary
- Pornography in Hungary
- Korda Studios, a new film studio near Budapest nicknamed Etyekwood
- Origo Studios
- Media of Hungary

== Bibliography ==
- Cunningham, John. Hungarian Cinema: From Coffee House to Multiplex. Wallflower Press, 2004.
- Gábor Szilágyi. Életjel: a magyar filmművészet megszületése 1954–1956. Budapest: Magyar Filmintézet, 1994. ISBN 978-9-6371-4718-0
- István Zsugán. Szubjektív magyar filmtörténet: 1964–1994. Budapest: Osiris-Századvég, 1994. ISBN 978-9-6383-8495-9
- Gábor Szilágyi. Tűzkeresztség: a magyar játékfilm története, 1945–1953. Budapest: Magyar filmintézet, 1992. OCLC 28409300
- József Veress. A Magyar film története. Budapest: Anno Kiadó, 2006. ISBN 978-9-6337-5454-2
- István Nemeskürty. Word and image; history of the Hungarian cinema. Budapest: Corvina Press, 1968. OCLC 434165
