= Ottó Forgács =

Hungarian cinematographer

- Born: 2 February 1921; Budapest, Hungary
- Died: 9 February 1999 (aged 78); Budapest, Hungary
- Occupation: Cinematographer
- Years active: 1948–1981 (film & TV)

Ottó Forgács (1921–1999) was a Hungarian cinematographer. He worked in the Hungarian Film Industry shooting more than fifty feature films and shorts during his career. In 1953 he was worked on the popular release The State Department Store.

== Selected filmography ==
- Underground Colony (1951)
- The State Department Store (1953)
- Spiral Staircase (1957)
- What a Night! (1958)
- A Bird of Heaven (1958)
- Sunshine on the Ice (1961)
- The Man of Gold (1962)
- Tales of a Long Journey (1963)
- The Moneymaker (1964)
- Lady-Killer in Trouble (1964)

== Bibliography ==
- Cowie, Peter & Elley, Derek. World Filmography: 1967. Fairleigh Dickinson University Press, 1977.
- Waligórska-Huhle, Magdalena. Music, Longing and Belonging: Articulations of the Self and the Other in the Musical Realm. Cambridge Scholars Publishing, 2014.
