= Lajos Rajczy =

Hungarian actor

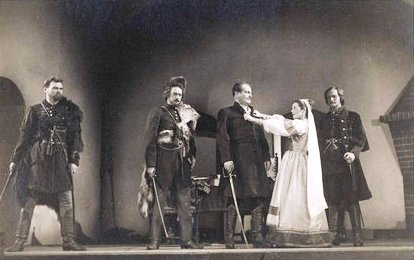
- Rajczy (left) onstage in 1938 along with Erzsi Somogyi and other cast members.
- Born: 1 July 1914; Budapest, Austro-Hungarian Empire
- Died: 22 May 1957 (aged 42); Montreal, Quebec, Canada
- Occupation: Actor
- Years active: 1940–1956 (film)

Lajos Rajczy (1914–1957) was a Hungarian stage and film actor. He was a member of the National Theatre in Budapest and appeared in films from 1940 onwards. After the defeat of the 1956 uprising he went into exile Vienna before emigrating to Canada where he committed suicide the following year. He was married to the actress Márta Bakó before they divorced.

== Selected filmography ==
- Gül Baba (1940)
- Sirius (1942)
- A Message from the Volga Shore (1942)
- Beautiful Star (1942)
- Loving Hearts (1944)
- Half a Boy (1944)
- The Schoolmistress (1945)
- A Strange Marriage (1951)
- Underground Colony (1951)
- Try and Win (1952)
- Under the City (1953)
- Fourteen Lives (1954)
- Springtime in Budapest (1955)
- Ward 9 (1955)
- Professor Hannibal (1956)
- The Bridge of Life (1956)
- By Order of the Emperor (1957)

== Bibliography ==
- Nemeskürty, István & Szántó, Tibor. A Pictorial Guide to the Hungarian Cinema, 1901-1984. Helikon, 1985.
- Petrie, Graham. History Must Answer to Man: The Contemporary Hungarian Cinema. Corvina Kiadó, 1981.
- Szabó, Miklós. Professional Émigrés. Pannonia Press, 1959.
