= Spiral Staircase (1957 film) =

1957 film

- Directed by: Frigyes Bán
- Written by: Tamás Bárány
- Produced by: Jenő Katona
- Starring: Rudolf Somogyvári; Éva Vass; Irén Sütő
- Cinematography: Ottó Forgács
- Edited by: Mária Daróczy
- Music by: Pál Kézdi-Zoltán
- Production company: Hunnia Filmgyár
- Release date: 17 October 1957
- Running time: 93 minutes
- Country: Hungary
- Language: Hungarian

Spiral Staircase (Hungarian: Csigalépcső) is a 1957 Hungarian drama film directed by Frigyes Bán and starring Rudolf Somogyvári, Éva Vass and Irén Sütő. It was shot at the Hunnia Studios in Budapest. The film's sets were designed by the art director Imre Sőrés.

== Cast ==
- Rudolf Somogyvári as Benkõ
- Éva Vass as Edit
- Irén Sütő as Márta
- Béla Barsi as Ilosfay
- Sándor Deák as Gerencser
- Ferenc Kállai as Ilosfay
- Béla Károlyi as Hangversenyen a közönség tagja
- Ilka Petur as Nagymama
- Sándor Tompa as Seszták
- István Egri as Gerencsér Béla
- Ilona Titkos as Hazainé a főbérlő

== Bibliography ==
- Balski, Grzegorz . Directory of Eastern European Film-makers and Films 1945-1991. Flicks Books, 1992.
