= Under the City =

1953 film by János Herskó

- Directed by: János Herskó
- Written by: Péter Halász
- Produced by: László Szirtes
- Cinematography: István Pásztor
- Edited by: Zoltán Kerényi
- Music by: György Ránki
- Production company: Magyar Filmgyártó Nemzeti Vállalat
- Release date: 3 December 1953
- Running time: 100 minutes
- Country: Hungary
- Language: Hungarian

Under the City (Hungarian: A város alatt) is a 1953 Hungarian film directed by János Herskó.

== Cast ==
- János Bagyinszky as Biczó
- Ferenc Bessenyei as Géza
- József Bihari as Holló
- Elma Bulla as Váradiné, Géza anyja
- Lucy Cziráky
- Sándor Deák
- Zoltán Gera
- László György as Holub
- János Gálcsiki
- Teri Horváth as Józsa
- Tivadar Horváth as Zederspitz
- László Kemény as Váradi, Géza apja
- Ferenc Kállai as Vadász
- István Palotai as Komor
- Sándor Peti as Friedmann
- Imre Pongrácz as Füge
- Sándor Pécsi as Varga
- Lajos Rajczy as Tömör
- János Rajz as Vihar
- Imre Sinkovits as Dobsa
- István Somló as Forba
- Sándor Szabó as Zilahi
- Vera Szemere
- Endre Szemethy as Deres
- Ádám Szirtes as Balogh
- Mária Sívó
- Sándor Tompa as Toronyi
- Ilus Vay

== Bibliography ==
- Desi Kégl Bognár & Katalin Szentpaly. Hungarians in America: A Biographical Directory of Professionals of Hungarian Origin in the Americas. Afi Publication, 1971.
