= Red Ink (1960 film) =

1960 film

- Directed by: Viktor Gertler
- Written by: Magda Szabó (novel)
- Produced by: József Golda
- Starring: Éva Vass; György Pálos; Nóra Tábori
- Cinematography: János Tóth
- Edited by: Sándor Boronkay
- Music by: Tibor Polgár
- Production company: Hunnia Filmgyár
- Distributed by: Mokép; Progress Film
- Release date: 7 January 1960
- Running time: 88 minutes
- Country: Hungary
- Language: Hungarian

Red Ink (Hungarian: Vörös tinta) is a 1960 Hungarian romantic drama film directed by Viktor Gertler and starring Éva Vass, György Pálos and Nóra Tábori. It was shot at the Hunnia Studios in Budapest. The film's sets were designed by the art director József Romvári.

== Cast ==
- Éva Vass as Kádár Mária
- György Pálos as Ács Zoltán
- Nóra Tábori as Erzsi, Ács felesége
- Myrtill Nádasi as Ács Kati
- József Timár as Igazgató
- Hilda Gobbi as Tóth Irma
- Margit Makay as Ónodi Jánosné, történelemtanár
- Imre Apáthi as Horner
- Ferenc Horváth as Jóska, igazgatóhelyettes
- László Kozák as Bodó
- Árpád Gyenge as Lányi Albert, énektanár
- Éva Schubert as Horváth Antónia, Tapsi
- Piri Peéry as Kapusnõ
- Nusi Somogyi as Virágárus
- Erzsi Seres as Egy mama
- Zsuzsa Fall as Nyolcadikos
- Margit Földessy as Nyolcadikos
- Ágnes Kriegs-Au as Nyolcadikos
- Cecília Szlávik as Nyolcadikos
- Ilona Tóth as Nyolcadikos

== Bibliography ==
- Balski, Grzegorz. Directory of Eastern European Film-makers and Films 1945-1991. Flicks Books, 1992.
- Liehm, Mira & Liehm, Antonín J. The Most Important Art: Soviet and Eastern European Film After 1945. University of California Press, 1980.
- Rîpeanu, Bujor. (ed.) International Directory of Cinematographers, Set- and Costume Designers in Film: Hungary (from the beginnings to 1988). Saur, 1981.
