= Viktor Gertler =

Hungarian film editor and director

- Born: 24 August 1901; Budapest, Austro-Hungarian Empire
- Died: 5 July 1969 (aged 67); Budapest, Hungary
- Occupations: Director, Editor
- Years active: 1930–1968 (film)

Viktor Gertler (24 August 1901 – 5 July 1969) was a Hungarian film editor and director active between the 1930s and 1960s.

== Selected filmography ==
=== Editor ===
- The Three from the Filling Station (1930)
- The Man in Search of His Murderer (1931)
- Der Kongreß tanzt (1931)
- Inquest (1931)
- About an Inquest (1931)
- I by Day, You by Night (1932)
- Storms of Passion (1932)
- Congress Dances (1932)
- Quick (1932)
- A City Upside Down (1933)
- Gently My Songs Entreat (1933)
- Peter (1934)
- Catherine the Last (1936)

=== Director ===
- Stolen Wednesday (1933)
- Sister Maria (1937)
- All Men Are Crazy (1937)
- Marika (1938)
- The Witch of Leanyvar (1938)
- The Wrong Man (1938)
- Without Lies (1946)
- Gala Suit (1949)
- Honesty and Glory (1951)
- Battle in Peace (1952)
- The State Department Store (1953)
- The Magic Chair (1954)
- Me and My Grandfather (1954)
- Accident (1955)
- Dollar Daddy (1956)
- Fever (1957)
- Up the Slope (1959)
- Red Ink (1960)
- Young Noszty and Mary Toth (1960)
- The Man of Gold (1962)
- Lady-Killer in Trouble (1964)
- The Man Who Doesn't Exist (1964)
- And Then The Guy... (1966)

== Bibliography ==
- Burns, Bryan. World Cinema: Hungary. Fairleigh Dickinson University Press, 1996.
