= Ferenc Zenthe =

Hungarian actor (1920–2006)

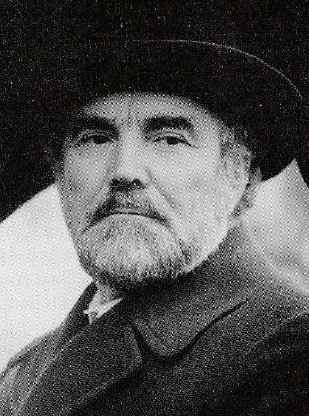
- Born: 20 April 1920; Salgóbánya, Hungary
- Died: 30 July 2006 (aged 86); Budapest, Hungary
- Occupation: Actor
- Years active: 1945–2006

Ferenc Zenthe (born Ferenc Rameshofer; 20 April 1920 – 30 July 2006) was a Hungarian actor, honored with being chosen as an Actor of the Nation, the Kossuth Prize and the Meritorious Artist Award of Hungary. Best known for the historical adventure series A Tenkes Kapitánya and pioneering soap opera Szomszédok, he was regarded as one of the great talents of his generation.

== Life and career ==
Ferenc Zenthe was born on 20 April 1920 in Salgóbánya (now part of Salgótarján) as the only son of a 50-year-old mining engineer. He attended the Cistercian high school of Eger, then attended four semesters in the University of Economics in Budapest, which he left to join the Academy of Performing Arts in 1941, but ended his studies after one year because of World War II. He joined the National Theatre of Pécs in 1945, and after two seasons, the Kisfaludy Theatre of Győr (now the National Theatre of Győr). In 1949 he joined the Csokonai Theatre of Debrecen, and in 1952 the Madách Theatre of Budapest, where he stayed for the rest of his life.

Beloved by the audience from the start of his career, he received numerous film and television roles in the restarting Hungarian film industry. His first role was the one of army general Sándor Nagy in Föltámadott a Tenger, then the leading role of Rákóczi hadnagya. This followed a series of romantic/comedic roles: a Kétszer kettő néha 5, Mese a 12 találatról, Kölyök, Fapados szerelem. In 1963 he got the leading role of the first series produced by the Hungarian Television: A Tenkes kapitánya (The Captain of Tenkes). As the leery Máté Eke in one of the greatest success of early Hungarian television, Zenthe's fame grew potentially. He led the cast of the Oscar-nominated The Revolt of Job in 1983. Beside movies and stage roles, he was mainly known from TV series like Tüskevár, Fekete Város, Bors, and particularly the first Hungarian soap opera, Szomszédok, in which he played the grumbling old taxi driver Uncle Taki throughout the series' entire 12-year run (1987 to 1999).

Ferenc Zenthe also performed numerous voice roles in animated films and series and radio plays. He was a cast member of Europe's longest running radio drama series, Szabó család, for which he recorded scenes even from his deathbed. Ferenc Zenthe died of pneumonia on 30 July 2006, and was buried in the Farkasréti Cemetery.

== Awards ==
- 1954, 1968 Jászai Mari Award
- 1975 Merited Artist Award
- 1984 Award of Film Critics
- 1989 Distinguished Artist Award
- 1992 Erzsébet Award
- 1993 Award of the Hungarian Actor's Guild
- 1995 Order of Merit of the Hungarian Republic, Officer's Cross
- 1997 Kossuth Prize
- 2000 Honorary citizenship in Siklós
- 2003 Honorary citizenship in his hometown of Salgótarján
- 2005 Hungarian Heritage Award
- 2005 Actor of the Hungarian Nation

== Filmography ==
- Föltámadott a tenger (1953)
- Kétszer kettő néha 5 (1954)
- Rakoczy's Lieutenant (1954)
- Leila and Gábor (1956)
- Tale on the Twelve Points (1957)
- A nagyrozsdási eset (1957)
- A Quiet Home (1958)
- What a Night! (1958)
- Szerelem csütörtök (1959)
- Sleepless Years (1959)
- Kard és kocka (1959)
- Kölyök (1959)
- Fapados szerelem (1960)
- Az arc nélküli város (1960)
- Alázatosan jelentem! (1960)
- Felmegyek a miniszterhez (1961)
- Jó utat autóbusz! (1961)
- Különös tárgyalás (1961)
- Mindenki gyanús (1961)
- Land of Angels (1962)
- Meztelen diplomata (1963)
- Tücsök (1963)
- Hivatalos utazás (1963)
- Lajos király válik (1964)
- Játék a múzeumban (1965)
- Két találkozás (1965)
- Patyolat akció (1965)
- A férfi egészen más (1966)
- Énekesmadár (1967)
- Egri csillagok (1968)
- A beszélő köntös (1968)
- Szemüvegesek (1968)
- Legenda a páncélvonatról (1969)
- Az örökös (1969)
- Őrjárat az égen (1969)
- Végállomás, kiszállni! (1970)
- A gyilkos a házban van (1970)
- Márton bátyám (1970)
- Vargabetű (1970)
- Hahó Öcsi! (1970)
- Vidám elefántkór (1970)
- Tisztújítás (1970)
- Valaki a sötétből (1970)
- Játék olasz módra (1970)
- Barátság (1970)
- Jó estét nyár, jó estét szerelem! (1971)
- Fegyház a körúton (1971)
- Remetekan (1971)
- Öngyilkos (1971)
- Fuss, hogy utolérjenek (1972)
- Az ördög cimborája (1972)
- Romantika (1972)
- Illatos út a semmibe (1972)
- A vőlegény nyolckor érkezik (1972)
- Irgalom (1973)
- Egy szerelem három éjszakája (1973)
- A törökfejes kopja (1973)
- Egy srác fehér lovon (1973)
- Bekötött szemmel (1974)
- Csata a hóban (1975)
- A méla tempefői (1975)
- A tragédia próbája (1975)
- Beszterce ostroma (1976)
- Csaló az üveghegyen (1976)
- Robog az úthenger (1976)
- Utolsó a padban (1976)
- Sir John Falstaff (1977)
- Családi kör (1977)
- Mire megvénülünk (1978)
- A világ közepe (1979)
- Égigérő fű (1979)
- A világ közepe (1979)
- Petőfi (1980)
- A Pogány Madonna (1980)
- A névtelen vár (1981)
- Csak semmi pánik (1982)
- Különös házasság (1983)
- Jób lázadása (1983)
- Erdő (1984)
- Megfelelő ember kényes feladatra (1984)
- Leányvásár (1984)
- Utazás az öreg autóval (1985)
- A három nővér (1985)
- Az elvarázsolt dollár (1985)
- II. József (1985)
- A csodakarikás (1986)
- A fantasztikus nagynéni (1986)
- Gyökér és vadvirág (1987)
- Halál sekély vízben (1993)
- Európa messze van (1994)
- Komédiások (2000)
- Zsaruvér és Csigavér I.: A királyné nyakéke (2001)
- Csocsó, avagy éljen május elseje! (2001)
- Zsaruvér és Csigavér II.: Több tonna kámfor (2002)
- Magyar vándor (2004)

== Television series ==
- A Tenkes kapitánya (1963)
- Princ, a katona (1966)
- Oly korban éltünk (1966)
- Tüskevár (1967)
- Őrjárat az égen (1969)
- Bors (1968)
- Rózsa Sándor (1970)
- A fekete város (1971)
- Vivát, Benyovszky! (1975)
- Szomszédok (1987-1999)
- Kerek világ (1988)
- Komédiások (2000)
- Sobri (2003)
