= Piri Peéry =

Hungarian actress (1904–1962)

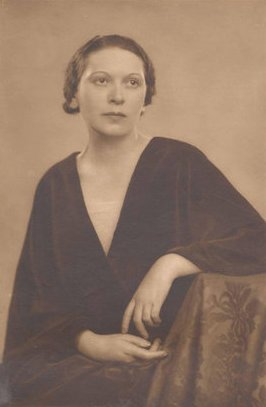
- Peéry in 1930
- Born: 12 May 1904; Budapest, Austro-Hungarian Empire
- Died: 31 December 1962 (aged 58); Pécs, Hungary
- Occupations: Actress; screenwriter
- Years active: 1935–1961 (film)

Piri Peéry (12 May 1904 – 31 December 1962) was a Hungarian stage and film actress. She appeared as a character actress in a number of Hungarian film productions.

== Selected filmography ==
- Romance of Ida (1934)
- The Empress and the Hussar (1935)
- St. Peter's Umbrella (1935 film) (1935)
- The New Landlord (1935)
- Magda Expelled (1938)
- The Five-Forty (1939)
- Janos the Valiant (1939)
- Money Talks (1940)
- A Bowl of Lentils (1941)
- Mouse in the Palace (1943)
- Battle in Peace (1952)
- Ward 9 (1955)
- Merry-Go-Round (1956)
- Dani (1957)
- Iron Flower (1958)
- Red Ink (1960)

== Bibliography ==
- Laura, Ernesto G. Tutti i film di Venezia, 1932–1984. La Biennale, Settore cinema e spettacolo televisivo, 1985.
- Sammons, Eddie. Shakespeare: A Hundred Years on Film. Scarecrow Press, 2004.
