= Sunshine on the Ice =

1961 film

- Directed by: Frigyes Bán
- Written by: Frigyes Bán; Antal Lukács
- Produced by: József Bajusz
- Starring: Ferenc Bessenyei; Manyi Kiss; Mária Mezei
- Cinematography: Ottó Forgács
- Edited by: Sándor Zákonyi
- Music by: Ferenc Erkel; Szabolcs Fényes
- Production company: Hunnia Filmgyár
- Release date: 17 August 1961
- Running time: 77 minutes
- Country: Hungary
- Language: Hungarian

Sunshine on the Ice (Hungarian: Napfény a jégen) is a 1961 Hungarian comedy film directed by Frigyes Bán and starring Ferenc Bessenyei, Manyi Kiss and Mária Mezei. It was shot at the Hunnia Studios in Budapest. The film's sets were designed by the art director József Romvári.

== Cast ==
- Ferenc Bessenyei as Rezsõ
- Manyi Kiss as Theodóra
- Mária Mezei as Józsa
- Irén Psota as Rózsa
- Marietta Kovács as Andrea
- Katalin Rákosi as Klári
- József Szendrõ as Biztosítási ügynök
- Alfonzó as Ügyelõ
- László Kabos as Boy
- Anna Tõkés as Ruhatervezõnõ
- Károly Mécs as Jancsi

== Bibliography ==
- Balski, Grzegorz . Directory of Eastern European Film-makers and Films 1945-1991. Flicks Books, 1992.
- Homoródy, József. Magyar film, 1948-1963. Filmtudományi Intézet, 1964.
