= Éva Vass =

Hungarian actress (1933–2019)

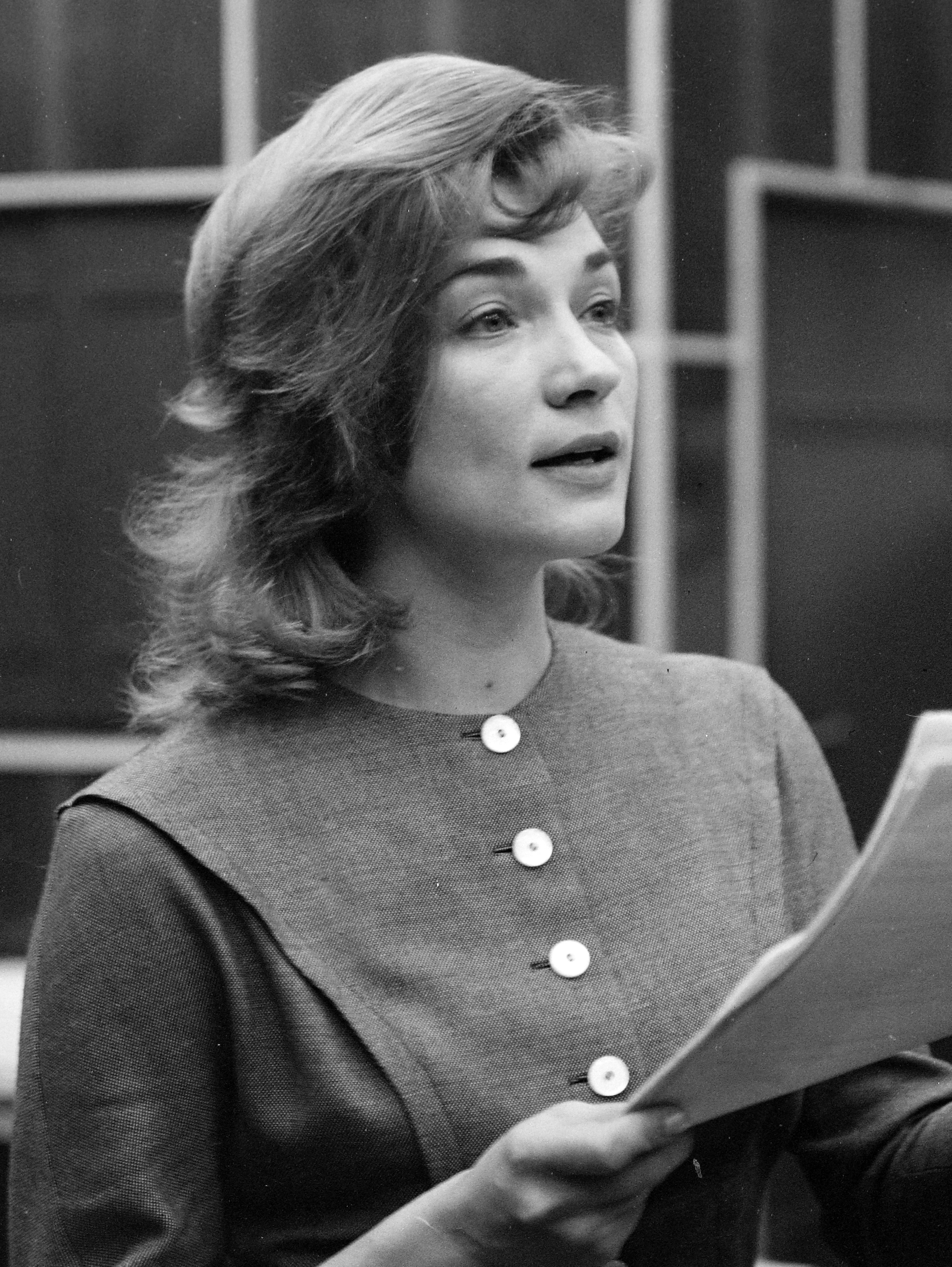
- Vass in 1963
- Born: 23 July 1933; Budapest, Kingdom of Hungary
- Died: 12 May 2019 (aged 85); Budapest, Hungary
- Occupation: Actress
- Years active: 1954–1996 (film)

Éva Vass (1933–2019) was a Hungarian stage, film and television actress. She was married to the film director Frigyes Bán and the actor Miklós Gábor.

== Selected filmography ==
- Flying Gold (1932)
- Rakoczy's Lieutenant (1954)
- Spiral Staircase (1957)
- Bogáncs (1959)
- Sleepless Years (1959)
- Red Ink (1960)
- Nem ér a nevem (1961)
- The Man Who Doesn't Exist (1964)
- Car Crazy (1965)

== Bibliography ==
- Fekete, Márton. Prominent Hungarians: Home and Abroad. Szepsi Csombor Literary Circle, 1979.
- Nemeskürty, István & Szántó, Tibor. A Pictorial Guide to the Hungarian Cinema, 1901-1984. Helikon, 1985.
