= Battle in Peace =

1952 film

- Directed by: Viktor Gertler
- Written by: László Té Szabó
- Produced by: Ferenc Pless
- Starring: Tibor Molnár; Ádám Szirtes; László Bánhidi
- Cinematography: István Pásztor
- Edited by: Mária Szécsényi
- Music by: György Ránki
- Production company: Mafilm
- Release date: 4 April 1952
- Running time: 90 minutes
- Country: Hungary
- Language: Hungarian

Battle in Peace (Hungarian: Ütközet békében) is a 1952 Hungarian drama film directed by Viktor Gertler and starring Tibor Molnár, Ádám Szirtes and László Bánhidi. It was shot at the Hunnia Studios in Budapest. The film's sets were designed by the art director József Pán. It was produced when Socialist realism was at its height in Communist Hungary.

== Synopsis ==
A tractor driver enlists in the Hungarian Army, but struggles to adjust to military service. Ultimately his attempts at individualism are overcome by his training and the love of the attractive Marika.

== Cast ==
- Éva Szentirmai as Marika
- Tibor Molnár as Széki
- Ádám Szirtes as Beke, András
- László Bánhidi as Id. Beke
- Ferenc Bessenyei as Antal
- András Ambrus as Bogár
- János Bagyinszky as Czakó
- Katalin Berek as Balogh Anna
- Zsuzsa Gyurkovics as Juliska
- Józsa Hacser as Bori
- Elemér Tarsoly as Mátyus
- Tibor Haraszin as Juhász
- János Kovács as Ferke
- László Kozák as Kapor
- László Márkus as Dániel
- István Palotai as Falus
- Piri Peéry as András anyja
- István Rozsos as Kovács
- László Hlatky
- László Joó
- László Hadics
- János Gálcsiki
- Ferenc Kalocsai Kiss
- István Lázi
- Gábor Mádi Szabó
- István Prókai
- Imre Surányi
- László Szabó
- Károly Szalay
- István Szoboszlay
- Endre Tallós
- István Tóth
- László Csákányi
- György Gonda

== Bibliography ==
- Balski, Grzegorz. Directory of Eastern European Film-makers and Films 1945-1991. Flicks Books, 1992.
- Homoródy, József. Magyar film, 1948-1963. Filmtudományi Intézet, 1964.
