= Gábor Agárdy =

Hungarian actor

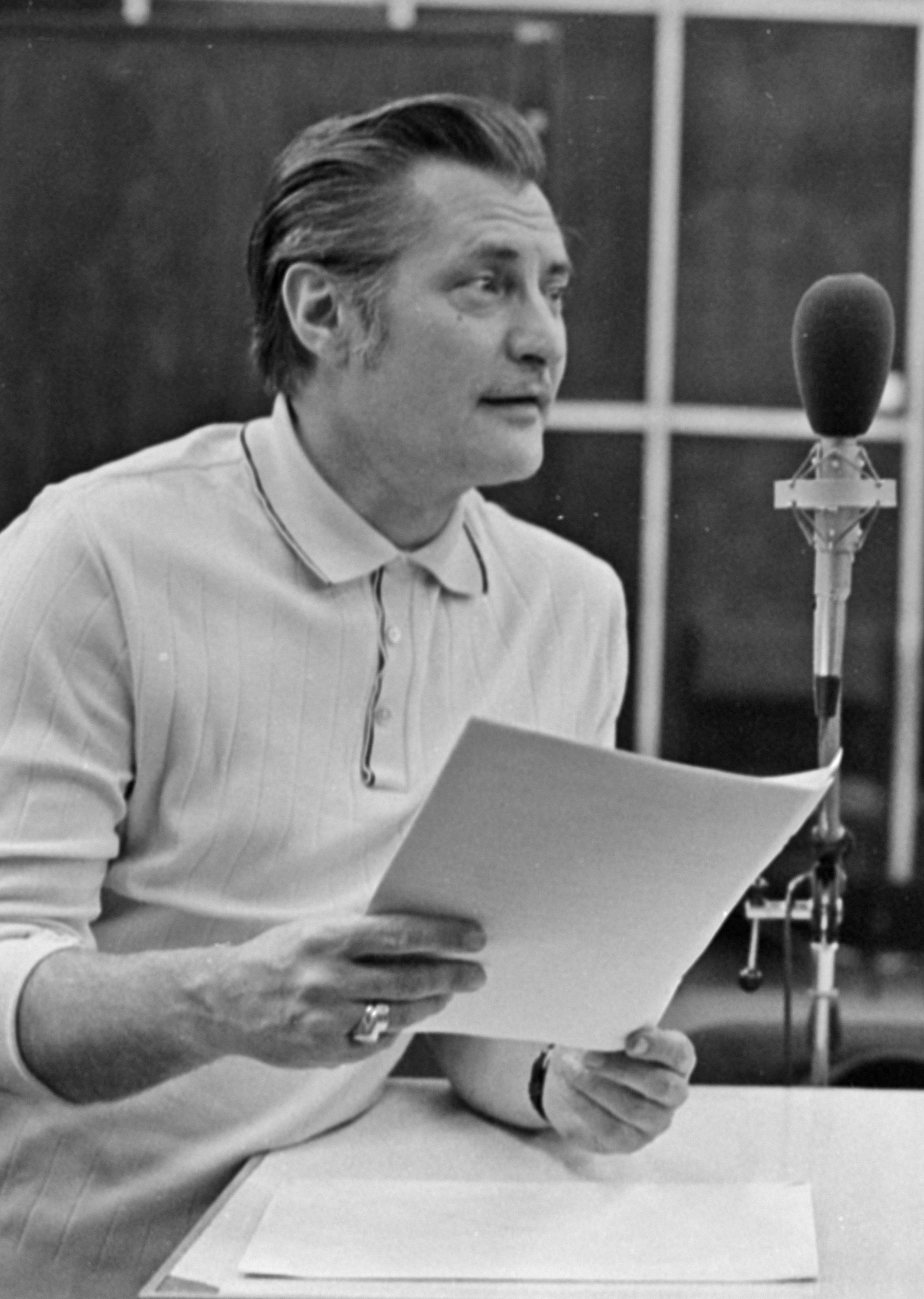
- Gábor Agárdy, 1974
- Born: 2 August 1922; Szeged, Kingdom of Hungary
- Died: 19 January 2006 (aged 83); Budapest, Hungary
- Occupation: actor
- Years active: 1954-2006

Gábor Agárdy (Armenian: Գաբրիել Արկալիյան, 2 August 1922 – 19 January 2006) was a Hungarian actor, also known as Gábor Agárdi. He was born Gábor Arklian in Szeged of Armenian descent. He was awarded the 2000 Lifetime Award: Actor of the (Hungarian) Nation.

== Filmography ==
List of acting performances in film and television
Year	Title	Role	Note
1954	Me and My Grandfather	Tanító	
1956	Kati és a vadmacska	Erdõmérnök	
1957	Éjfélkor		Uncredited
1958	A Bird of Heaven	Az apa	
1958	The Smugglers	Mihály	
1958	Razzia	Szentandrássy	
1959	Sleepless Years	Tóth	
1959	For Whom the Larks Sing	Csiszér	
1959	Pár lépés a határ	Fábián pap	
1960	A megfelelö ember		
1960	Virrad	Bártfai,igazgató	
1960	Kálvária	Kovács Feri, Gizi férje	
1961	Hosszú az út hazáig		
1961	Puskák és galambok		
1962	Délibáb minden mennyiségben	Angyal András / Antal Bandi	
1962	Amíg holnap lesz	Erõs Gábor	
1962	Fagyosszentek	Czimer András	
1963	Mici néni két élete		Uncredited
1963	Hogy állunk, fiatalember?	Környei Gábor, párttitkár	
1963	Germinal		
1964	Másfél millió	Kálmán	
1964	Ha egyszer húsz év múlva	Gyuszi bácsi	
1965	A tizedes meg a többiek	Leventeparancsnok	
1966	The Round-Up	Torma	
1966	Minden kezdet nehéz		
1966	Kárpáthy Zoltán	Kutyfalvy András	
1966	Egy magyar nábob	Kutyafalvy András	
1967	Édes és keserü		
1967	Jaguar	Mazurka	
1967	Egy szerelem három éjszakája		
1968	Eltávozott nap	A züllött szabó	
1968	Stars of Eger	Sárközy	
1969	Ismeri a szandi mandit?	Cukrász	
1969	A varázsló	Balogh apuka	
1970	Szemtöl szembe	Fóris János	
1971	Husaren in Berlin	Baboczay	
1973	Kakuk Marci	Erdész	
1973	Csínom Palkó	Tyukodi	
1974	The Danube Pilot	Dragos Károly / Karl Jäger	
1977	Mattie the Goose-boy	Ispán	Voice
1977	Kísértés	Szállodai alkalmazott	
1982	Völegény	Csuszik Zsiga	
1997	Retúr	Károlyi	
2002	The Last Blues	Zsul	
2004	Gáspár	József	TV movie
