= Zoltán Gera (actor) =

Hungarian actor

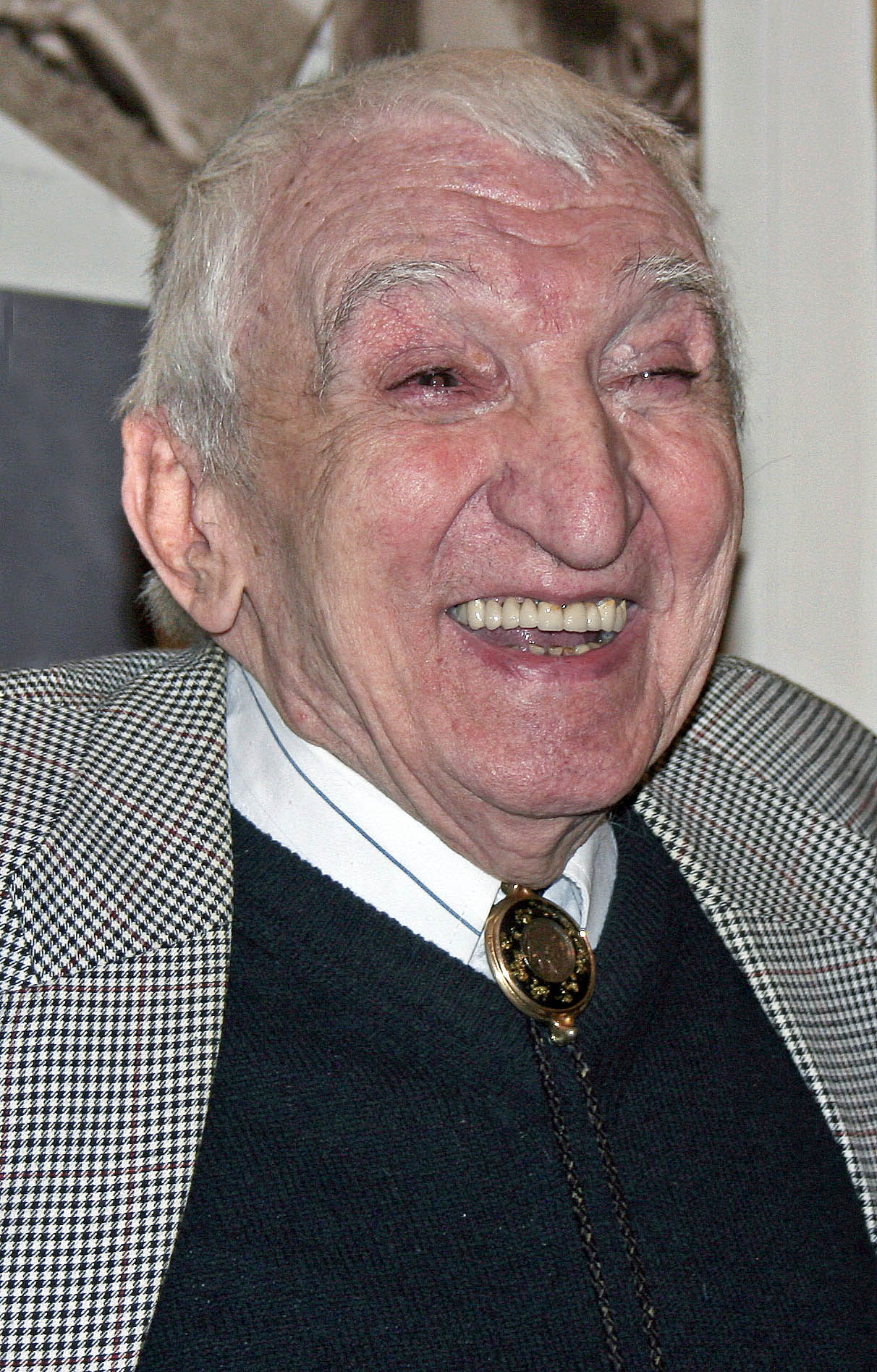
- Zoltán Gera in February 2014
- Born: August 19, 1923; Szeged, Hungary
- Died: November 7, 2014 (aged 91); Budapest, Hungary
- Occupation: Actor
- Years active: 1939–2014

Zoltán Gera (August 19, 1923 – November 7, 2014) was a Hungarian actor, honored with being chosen as an Actor of the Hungarian Nation, the Kossuth Prize, and the Meritorious Artist Award of Hungary. He has starred in 115 movies (according to IMDb).

== Early life ==
Zoltán Gera was born on 19 August 1923 in Szeged, Hungary. Gera started working with several theaters while he was a teenager. Gera graduated from the College of Theater and Film Arts(now the University of Theatre and Film Arts).

== Death ==
Gera died on 7 November 2014 at Budapest, Hungary.

== Awards ==
- 1985 Magyarország Érdemes Művésze díj
- 2004 Distinguished Artist Award
- 2012 Grand Commander to the Hungarian Order of Merit
- 2013 Kossuth Prize
- 2014 Actor of the Hungarian Nation

== International filmography ==
- És a vakok látnak... (1944)
- A város alatt (1956)
- Szakadék (1956)
- Az eltüsszentett birodalom (1956) - Udvaronc
- Sunday Romance (1957) - Postás
- Láz (1957)
- Csigalépcső (1957)
- Dani (1957)
- Éjfélkor (1957) - (uncredited)
- Csendes otthon (1958)
- Iron Flower (1958) - Novák
- La Belle et le Tzigane (1958) - Zenész
- Micsoda éjszaka! (1958) - Nyomozó (uncredited)
- The Smugglers (1958) - Tekejátékos
- Édes Anna (1958) - Újságíró (uncredited)
- Kölyök (1959)
- Up the Slope (1959)
- A harminckilences dandár (1959)
- Álmatlan évek (1959)
- The Bells Have Gone to Rome (1959) - Karszalagos
- Kard és kocka (1959)
- Szerelem csütörtök (1959)
- A megfelelő ember (1960)
- Virrad (1960)
- Fűre lépni szabad (1960)
- Az arc nélküli város (1960) - Lajos
- Alba Regia (1961)
- Négyen az árban (1961)
- Puskák és galambok (1961)
- Two Half Times in Hell (1961) - Tankó Sándor
- Áprilisi riadó (1962)
- Mindenki ártatlan? (1962)
- Mici néni két élete (1963)
- Meztelen diplomata (1963) - (uncredited)
- Mindennap élünk (1963)
- The Man Who Doesn't Exist (1964) - Újságíró
- The Golden Head (1964)
- My Way Home (1965) - Hadifogoly
- Ketten haltak meg (1966) - Raktáros
- Sok hűség semmiért (1966)
- Holdudvar (1969) - Balassa barátja
- Alfa Romeó és Júlia (1969) - (uncredited)
- Krebsz, az isten (1970) - Dr. Mikulik
- Utazás a koponyám körül (1970) - Sorbanálló (uncredited)
- A nagy kék jelzés (1970) - Jenő főnöke
- A halhatatlan légiós (1971) - Rabbi
- A vőlegény nyolckor érkezik (1972) - Az Étterem Vezetője
- A magyar ugaron (1973) - Kárász úr
- Csínom Palkó (1973) - Leopold, szakács
- A locsolókocsi (1974) - Tanár
- Illatos út a semmibe (1974)
- Kincskereső kisködmön (1974) - Körtemuzsika árus
- Ballagó idő (1976) - Tanító
- Psevdonim: Lukac (1977)
- Hungarians (1978) - Brainer, intézõ
- Örökség (1980) - Hungarian dubbing voice: Uncle Fülöp
- Naplemente délben (1980) - Az impresszárió
- Circus maximus (1980) - Bajuszos tiszt
- Narcissus and Psyche (1980) - Orfeum director
- Der Mann, der sich in Luft auflöste (1980) - Kuti, the porter
- A remény joga (1981) - Az orvos
- Escape to Victory (1981) - Victor - The French
- Nyom nélkül (1982) - A nyomozás vezetõje
- Hatásvadászok (1983) - Selmeczi
- Vérszerződés (1983) - Apa
- Wagner (1983, TV Mini-Series) - Lüttichau
- A csoda vége (1984) - Bakos Sanyi
- Szeretők (1984) - Dékán
- Boszorkányszombat (1984) - Király
- Házasság szabadnappal (1984)
- Lily in Love (1984) - Malev Officer
- The Treasure of Swamp Castle (1985) - Asil (voice)
- Khromoy dervish (1986)
- Cat City (1986) - Captain (voice, uncredited)
- Akli Miklós (1986)
- Mamiblu (1986)
- Szamárköhögés (1987) - Szomszéd
- Doktor Minorka Vidor nagy napja (1987) - Tyúkárus
- Küldetés Evianba (1988)
- Laurin (1989) - Herr Engels
- Music Box (1989) - Man in Budapest
- The Bachelor (1990)
- The Long Shadow (1992) - Rabbi Rosner
- Maigret (1992, in the episode "Maigret and the Burglar's Wife") - Waiter
- Prinzenbad (1993)
- A gólyák mindig visszatérnek (1993) - Tiszteletes
- Mesmer (1994) - Another Doctor
- Bűvös vadász (1994) - Shoemaker
- Le jardin des plantes (1994) - Marcel
- Citizen X (1995, TV Movie) - Doctor
- Ébredés (1995) - Józsi bácsi
- The Hunchback (1997, TV Movie) - Overweight Noble
- For My Baby (1997) - Jackie Weiss
- Retúr (1997) - Nagypapa
- The Gambler (1997) - Creditor
- Shot through the heart (1998, TV Movie) - Nebojis
- Crime and Punishment (1998, TV Movie) - Praskovya
- The Fall (1999) - Concierge
- Sunshine (1999) - Man at Synagogue
- The Prince and the Pauper (2000, TV Movie) - Merchant
- Contaminated Man (2000) - Store Owner
- Uprising (2001, TV Movie) - Market Vendor
- Az utolsó blues (2002) - Sanu
- Rose's Songs (2003) - Mr. Waltz
- Egy hét Pesten és Budán (2003) - Szállodaportás
- Prima Primavera (2009) - Dr. Ferenczy (final film role)
