= The Man Who Doesn't Exist =

1964 film

- Directed by: Viktor Gertler
- Written by: Jenõ Szántó (novel); Anna Borhy; Nándor Kovács; András Polgár
- Produced by: Ottó Elek; Lajos Gulyás
- Starring: Miklós Gábor; Éva Vass; Andor Ajtay
- Cinematography: Barnabás Hegyi
- Edited by: Mária Daróczy
- Music by: Emil Petrovics
- Production company: Hunnia Filmgyár
- Release date: 20 February 1964
- Running time: 88 minutes
- Country: Hungary
- Language: Hungarian

The Man Who Doesn't Exist (Hungarian: Egy ember, aki nincs) is a 1964 Hungarian crime drama film directed by Viktor Gertler and starring Miklós Gábor, Éva Vass and Andor Ajtay. It was shot at the Hunnia Studios in Budapest. The film's sets were designed by the art director Melinda Vasáry.

== Cast ==
- Miklós Gábor as Tímár százados
- Éva Vass as Dienes Krisztina
- Andor Ajtay as Alezredes
- Mari Szemes as Kiss Anci
- Manyi Kiss as Vágóné
- Erzsi Máthé as Vágó menyasszonya
- Károly Bicskey as Rendõrtiszt
- Ernõ Szénási as Balázs
- Tibor Molnár as Zámbó
- Sándor Pethes as Szobrászmûvész
- László Inke as Kemenessy
- László György as Bányász
- Kálmán Koletár as Bányász
- István Prókai as Bányász
- Noémi Apor as Dobosné
- Gyula Bakos as János bácsi
- Ferenc Buday as Rendõrtiszt
- Frigyes Bárány as Fõmérnök
- László Csákányi as Bányász
- Ferenc Deák B. as Bányász
- Pál Elekes as Nyaraló
- Zoltán Gera as Újságíró
- Pálma Gyimesi as Levéltáros

== Bibliography ==
- Balski, Grzegorz. Directory of Eastern European Film-makers and Films 1945-1991. Flicks Books, 1992.
- Liehm, Mira & Liehm, Antonín J. The Most Important Art: Soviet and Eastern European Film After 1945. University of California Press, 1980.
- Rîpeanu, Bujor. (ed.) International Directory of Cinematographers, Set- and Costume Designers in Film: Hungary (from the beginnings to 1988). Saur, 1981.
