= I Can't Live Without Music (film) =

1935 film

- Directed by: Alfréd Deésy
- Written by: Zsigmond Móricz (novel); Alfréd Deésy
- Produced by: István Rado
- Starring: Pál Jávor; Erzsi Somogyi; Gyula Gózon
- Cinematography: Heinrich Balasch; József Bécsi
- Edited by: Péter Pokol
- Music by: István Rado
- Production company: Kino Filmipari
- Release date: 30 December 1935
- Running time: 98 minutes
- Country: Hungary
- Language: Hungarian

I Can't Live Without Music (Hungarian: Nem élhetek muzsikaszó nélkül) is a 1935 Hungarian comedy film directed by Alfréd Deésy and starring Pál Jávor, Erzsi Somogyi and Gyula Gózon. It was shot at the Hunnia Studios in Budapest.

== Cast ==
- Pál Jávor as Balázs
- Erzsi Somogyi as Pólika, a felesége
- Ferenc Delly as Viktor
- Györgyi Sághy as Birike
- Gyula Gózon as Lajos bácsi
- Ilona Dajbukát as Lajos bácsi felesége
- Mariska Vízváry as Zsani néni
- Lili Berky as Pepi néni
- Piroska Vaszary as Mina néni
- Lajos Gárdonyi as Fodor
- Gyula Tapolczay as Cigányprímás
- József Berky as Nagybõgõs
- Mihály Dávid as Gergõ, béres
- István Falussy as Fogadós
- Dóra Kelen as Méltóságos asszony, vendég a mulatságon
- Imre László as Mulatozó férfi
- Ferenc Pataki as Vendég a mulatságon
- Géza Rónai as István, kertész a nagynéniknél
- Dezsö Szalóky as Ittas vendég a mulatságon

== Bibliography ==
- Bolton, Lucy & Wright Julie Lobalzo (ed.) Lasting Screen Stars: Images that Fade and Personas that Endure. Springer, 2016.
- Juhász, István. Kincses magyar filmtár 1931-1944: az eredeti forgatókönyvből 1931 és 1944 között létrejött hazai mozgóképekről. Kráter, 2007.
- Koerner, Andras. How They Lived: The Everyday Lives of Hungarian Jews, 1867-1940. Central European University Press, 2015.
- Rîpeanu, Bujor. (ed.) International Directory of Cinematographers, Set- and Costume Designers in Film: Hungary (from the beginnings to 1988). Saur, 1981.
- Vilmos, Várkonyi. Jávor Pál: és a magyar film aranykora. Zima Szabolcs, 2013
