= Iron Flower =

1958 film

- Directed by: János Herskó
- Written by: Andor Endre Gelléri; Miklós Köllõ
- Starring: Mari Törőcsik
- Cinematography: Ferenc Szécsényi
- Edited by: Zoltán Kerényi
- Production company: Hunnia Filmgyár
- Release date: 1 May 1958
- Running time: 101 minutes
- Country: Hungary
- Language: Hungarian

Iron Flower (Hungarian: Vasvirág) is a 1958 Hungarian drama film directed by János Herskó. It was entered into the 1958 Cannes Film Festival. It was shot at the Hunnia Studios in Budapest.

== Plot ==
The story takes place in Óbuda in the 1930s. István Pettersen is a well-meaning, excellent fabric dyer, yet unemployed and homeless. He pulls himself into a miserable hut set on an abandoned plot and devotes his life to casual work. He meets and spends some happy days in the viscose with the orphaned Vera, who works at the local laundromat but dreams that, like her mother, she will one day be a dancer. Her boss, the wealthy Mr. Weiszhaupt, had long looked at her, and when the girl arrived late for work, he blackmails her.

== Cast ==
- Mari Törőcsik as Cink Vera
- István Avar as Pettersen István
- Zoltán Várkonyi
- Margit Dajka as Racsákné
- Manyi Kiss as Veronika
- Ildikó Szabó as Anni
- Hédi Váradi as Emmike
- Béla Barsi as Gedeon
- Zoltán Gera as Novák
- János Rajz as Koldus
- Gyula Szabó as Motyó
- Piri Peéry as Ilcsi madame
- Anni Soltész as Berta
- László Bánhidi as Józsi bácsi
- György Győrffy as Franci
- László Kozák as Szepi
- Sándor Pethes as Dr. Beck
- Ernő Szabó as Fischer
- Tibor Illés as Róbertke
