= László Szabó (actor) =

Hungarian actor

- Born: 24 March 1936 (age 90); Budapest, Hungary
- Occupation: Actor
- Years active: 1952–present

László Szabó (born 24 March 1936) is a Hungarian actor, film director and screenwriter. Since 1952, he has appeared in more than 120 films. These include seven films that have been screened at the Cannes Film Festival.

== Selected filmography ==
- Battle in Peace (1952)
- La Poupée (1962)
- Alphaville (1965)
- Pierrot le Fou (1965)
- Made in USA (1966)
- Weekend (1967)
- The Confession (1970)
- Adoption (1975)
- The Song of Roland (1978)
- Just Like Home (1978)
- Judith Therpauve (1978)
- A Nice Neighbor (1979)
- The Last Metro (1980)
- Temporary Paradise (1981)
- Passion (1982)
- Dögkeselyű (1982)
- Les nuits de la pleine lune (1984)
- Love on the Ground (1984)
- Accroche-coeur (1987)
- The Sentinel (1992)
- Les Enfants jouent à la Russie (1993)
- Cold Water (1994)
- Up, Down, Fragile (1995)
- Place Vendôme (1998)
- Esther Kahn (2000) - Ytzhok Kahn
- Playing 'In the Company of Men' (2003)
- Parc (2008)
