= Professor Hannibal =

1956 film

- Directed by: Zoltán Fábri
- Written by: Ferenc Móra (novel); István Gyenes; Péter Szász; Zoltán Fábri
- Starring: Ernő Szabó; Zoltán Greguss; Manyi Kiss; Noémi Apor
- Cinematography: Ferenc Szécsényi
- Edited by: Mária Szécsényi
- Music by: Zdenkó Tamássy
- Production company: Magyar Filmgyártó Vállalat
- Release date: 18 October 1956
- Running time: 88 minutes
- Country: Hungary
- Language: Hungarian

Professor Hannibal (Hungarian: Hannibál tanár úr) is a 1956 Hungarian drama film directed by Zoltán Fábri and starring Ernő Szabó, Zoltán Greguss and Manyi Kiss. The film is based on a novel by Ferenc Móra set in Budapest during the Interwar period. When a Latin teacher publishes an essay on the Carthaginian General Hannibal, he is quickly hailed as a celebrity genius, but in reality has become an unwitting pawn of far-right politicians. The film was chosen to be part both of Budapest Twelve, a list of Hungarian films considered the best in 1968 and its follow-up, the New Budapest Twelve in 2000.

== Release ==
The initial popularity of the film is hard to judge as five days after it premiered on 18 October 1956 the Hungarian Uprising began. It was re-released in 1957.

== Partial cast ==
- Ernő Szabó as Nyúl Béla
- Zoltán Greguss as Muray
- Manyi Kiss as Nyúl Béláné
- Noémi Apor as Lola
- Emmi Buttykay as Mici
- Hilda Gobbi as Vogelmayerné
- Oszkár Ascher as Schwarz Béni
- Ödön Bárdi as Danielisz
- Béla Barsi as Menyus
- Ferenc Bessenyei as Hannibál
- György Kálmán as Újságíró
- Zoltán Makláry as Manzák
- László Mensáros as Török
- László Misoga as Vogelmayer
- Lajos Rajczy as Rezsõ úr
- Mihály Selmeczy as Ofenthaler igazgató
- Rudolf Somogyvári as Vidrozsil
- József Szendrõ as Wilhelm

== Bibliography ==
- Cunningham, John. Hungarian Cinema: From Coffee House to Multiplex. Wallflower Press, 2004.
