= Katalin Berek =

Hungarian actress (1930–2017)

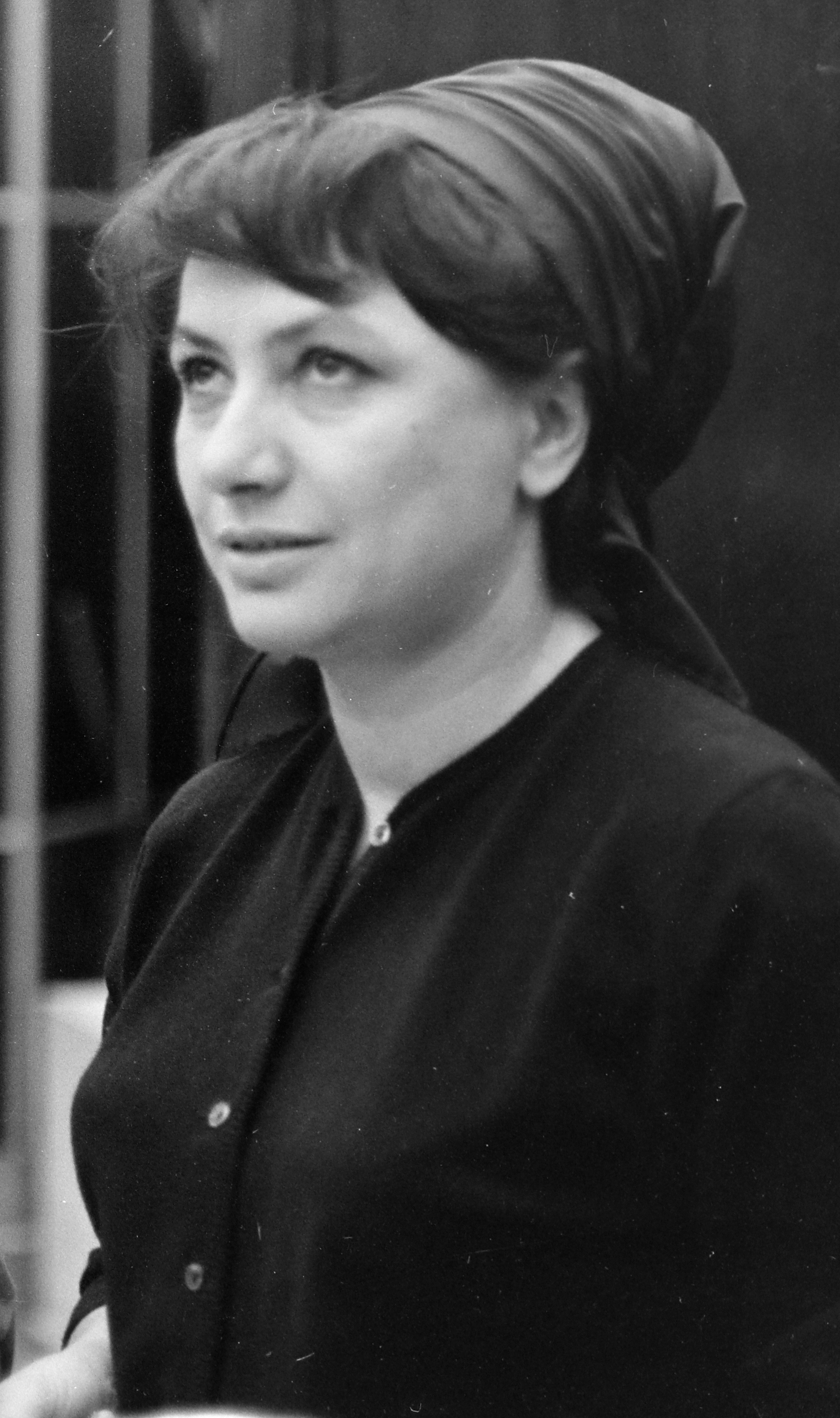
- Photograph courtesy of Fortepan
- Born: 7 October 1930; Makó, Hungary
- Died: 26 February 2017 (aged 86); Budapest, Hungary
- Other names: Kati Berek; Berek Kati
- Occupation: Actress
- Years active: 1950–1984

Katalin Berek (7 October 1930 – 26 February 2017), also known as Kati, was a Hungarian actress. She appeared in more than 40 films and television shows between 1950 and 2001. She starred in the 1975 film Adoption, which won the Golden Bear at the 25th Berlin International Film Festival. She was married to actor Pál Zolnay from 1959 to 1974, and their son János Zolnay was born in 1959.

== Selected filmography ==
- The Marriage of Katalin Kis (1950)
- Battle in Peace (1952)
- Fourteen Lives (1954)
- A Glass of Beer (1955)
- The Bridge of Life (1956)
- A Bird of Heaven (1958)
- The Upthrown Stone (1969)
- Adoption (1975)
