= A Bird of Heaven =

1958 film

- Directed by: Imre Fehér
- Written by: Tibor Cseres
- Based on: A Bird of Heaven by Zsigmond Móricz
- Produced by: Lajos Óvári
- Starring: Ádám Szirtes; Ferenc Kiss; Erzsi Somogyi
- Cinematography: Ottó Forgács
- Edited by: Zoltán Kerényi
- Music by: Imre Vincze
- Production company: Hunnia Filmstúdió
- Release date: 20 March 1958
- Running time: 103 minutes
- Country: Hungary
- Language: Hungarian

A Bird of Heaven (Hungarian: Égi madár) is a 1958 Hungarian drama film directed by Imre Fehér and starring Ádám Szirtes, Ferenc Kiss and Erzsi Somogyi. It was shot at the Hunnia Studios in Budapest and on location around Sopron. The film's sets were designed by the art director Mátyás Varga.

== Cast ==
- Ildikó Szabó as Panni
- Ádám Szirtes as Miska
- Ferenc Kiss as Komáromi gazda
- Erzsi Somogyi as Édes
- László Bánhidi as Atyus
- Manyi Kiss as Sógorasszony
- Gábor Agárdi as Az apa
- Béla Barsi as Tanító
- Katalin Berek as Lídia
- Sándor Deák as A bíró
- Teri Földi as Kánya Zsuzsi
- László György as Õrmester
- Terus Kováts as Miska keresztanyja
- Sándor Kömíves as Doctor
- János Makláry as Lídia apja
- Nusi Somogyi as Kati néni
- László Misoga as Sógor
- Irma Vass as Miska anyja

== Bibliography ==
- Costello, Tom. International Guide to Literature on Film. Bowker-Saur, 1994.
- Goble, Alan. The Complete Index to Literary Sources in Film. Walter de Gruyter, 1999.
- Homoródy, József. Magyar film, 1948-1963. Filmtudományi Intézet, 1964.
