= Rakoczy's Lieutenant =

1954 film

- Directed by: Frigyes Bán
- Written by: Tibor Barabás
- Produced by: Jenő Katona; Lajos Gulyás
- Starring: Tibor Bitskey; Éva Vass; Ferenc Zenthe
- Cinematography: Jean Badal
- Edited by: Sándor Zákonyi
- Music by: Ferenc Farkas
- Production company: Magyar Filmgyártó Nemzeti Vállalat
- Release date: 4 February 1954
- Running time: 114 minutes
- Country: Hungary
- Language: Hungarian

Rakoczy's Lieutenant (Hungarian: Rákóczi hadnagya) is a 1954 Hungarian historical adventure film directed by Frigyes Bán and starring Tibor Bitskey, Éva Vass and Ferenc Zenthe. It was shot at the Hunnia Studios in Budapest. The film's sets were designed by the art director Imre Sőrés. It is set during the War of Independence during the early eighteenth century. It was screened at the 1954 Locarno Film Festival. It was one of the most popular films at the Hungarian box office during the 1950s, drawing more than six and half million spectators.

== Cast ==
- Tibor Bitskey : as Lt. János Bornemissza
- Éva Vass : as Anna Bíró
- Endre Gyárfás : as Matyi, Anna’s brother
- Ferenc Zenthe : as Miska Fekete
- Ferenc Pethes : as Miska Rácz
- Gellért Raksányi : as István Suhajda
- Sándor Deák : as Francis II Rákóczi
- Gábor Mádi Szabó : as János Bottyán
- József Timár : as Brigadier Dobay
- Miklós Sármássy : as Captain Inczédy
- Sándor Szabó : as Count Maximilan Starhemberg
- István Egri : as Pichler, colonel Labanc
- Béla Károlyi : as Count Miklós Bercsényi

== Bibliography ==
- Balski, Grzegorz . Directory of Eastern European Film-makers and Films 1945–1991. Flicks Books, 1992.
- Ostrowska, Dorota, Pitassio, Francesco & Varga, Zsuzsanna. Popular Cinemas in East Central Europe: Film Cultures and Histories. Bloomsbury Publishing, 2017
