= Sleepless Years =

1959 film

- Directed by: Félix Máriássy
- Written by: Judit Máriássy
- Produced by: József Bajusz; Lajos Óvári
- Starring: Éva Ruttkai; Géza Tordy; Éva Vass
- Cinematography: György Illés
- Edited by: Mária Szécsényi
- Music by: Imre Vincze
- Production company: Hunnia Filmstúdió
- Release date: 2 April 1959
- Running time: 107 minutes
- Country: Hungary
- Language: Hungarian

Sleepless Years (Hungarian: Álmatlan évek) is a 1959 Hungarian drama film directed by Félix Máriássy and starring Éva Ruttkai, Géza Tordy, and Éva Vass. It was shot at Hunnia Studios in Budapest. The film's sets were designed by art director Melinda Vasáry. It was screened at the 1959 Venice Film Festival.

== Main cast ==
- Éva Ruttkai as Vilma
- Géza Tordy as Karesz
- Éva Vass as Irén
- Gábor Agárdi as Tóth
- Mari Törőcsik as Kató
- Oszkár Ascher as Lisszauer igazgató
- István Avar as Tutó
- Béla Barsi as Mihalik
- Gyula Bodrogi as Cserna
- József Fonyó as Berczik
- Hédi Temessy as Lisszauerné
- Ferenc Zenthe as Knézits Jani

== Bibliography ==
- Liehm, Mira & Liehm, Antonín J. The Most Important Art: Soviet and Eastern European Film After 1945. University of California Press, 1980.
- Rîpeanu, Bujor. (ed.) International Directory of Cinematographers, Set- and Costume Designers in Film: Hungary (from the beginnings to 1988). Saur, 1981.
