= Budapest Twelve =

List of 12 of the best Hungarian films between 1948 and 1968

The Budapest Twelve is a list of 12 Hungarian films considered the best from the period between 1948 and 1968. The films were chosen in secret ballot of the Hungarian film industry in 1968.

== Budapest Twelve ==
The International Federation of Film Critics (FIPRESCI) held its annual conference in Budapest in 1968, the year that marked the 20th anniversary of the nationalization of the Hungarian film industry. On this occasion, the department of film critics of the Alliance of Hungarian Filmmakers choose the best 12 films in a secret ballot. The films were screened at the 4th Hungarian Film Week and one year later aired on the Hungarian Public Television.

The full list of films:

#	Title	Director	Year
1.	Treasured Earth	Frigyes Bán	1948
2.	The Round-Up	Miklós Jancsó	1966
3.	Merry-Go-Round	Zoltán Fábri	1956
4.	Cold Days	András Kovács	1966
5.	Springtime in Budapest	Félix Máriássy	1955
6.	Professor Hannibal	Zoltán Fábri	1956
7.	In Soldier's Uniform	Imre Fehér	1957
8.	The House Under the Rocks	Károly Makk	1958
9.	Ten Thousand Days	Ferenc Kósa	1967
10.	Sodrásban	István Gaál	1963
11.	The Corporal and the Others	Márton Keleti	1966
12.	Father	István Szabó	1966

== New Budapest Twelve ==
In 2000, the Alliance of Hungarian Filmmakers and Television Directors along with the film and TV critic department of the National Association of Hungarian Journalists voted on the films they consider the best in the history of Hungarian cinema.

The full list of films:

#	Title	Director	Year
1.	The Round-Up	Miklós Jancsó	1966
2.	Love	Károly Makk	1971
3.	Szindbád	Zoltán Huszárik	1971
4.	People of the Mountains	István Szőts	1942
5.	Somewhere in Europe	Géza von Radványi	1948
6.	Time Stands Still	Péter Gothár	1982
7.	Hyppolit, the Butler	István Székely	1931
8.	Merry-Go-Round	Zoltán Fábri	1956
9.	Little Valentino	András Jeles	1979
10.	My 20th Century	Ildikó Enyedi	1989
11.	Father	István Szabó	1966
12.	Professor Hannibal	Zoltán Fábri	1956
