= Ferenc Bessenyei =

Hungarian actor

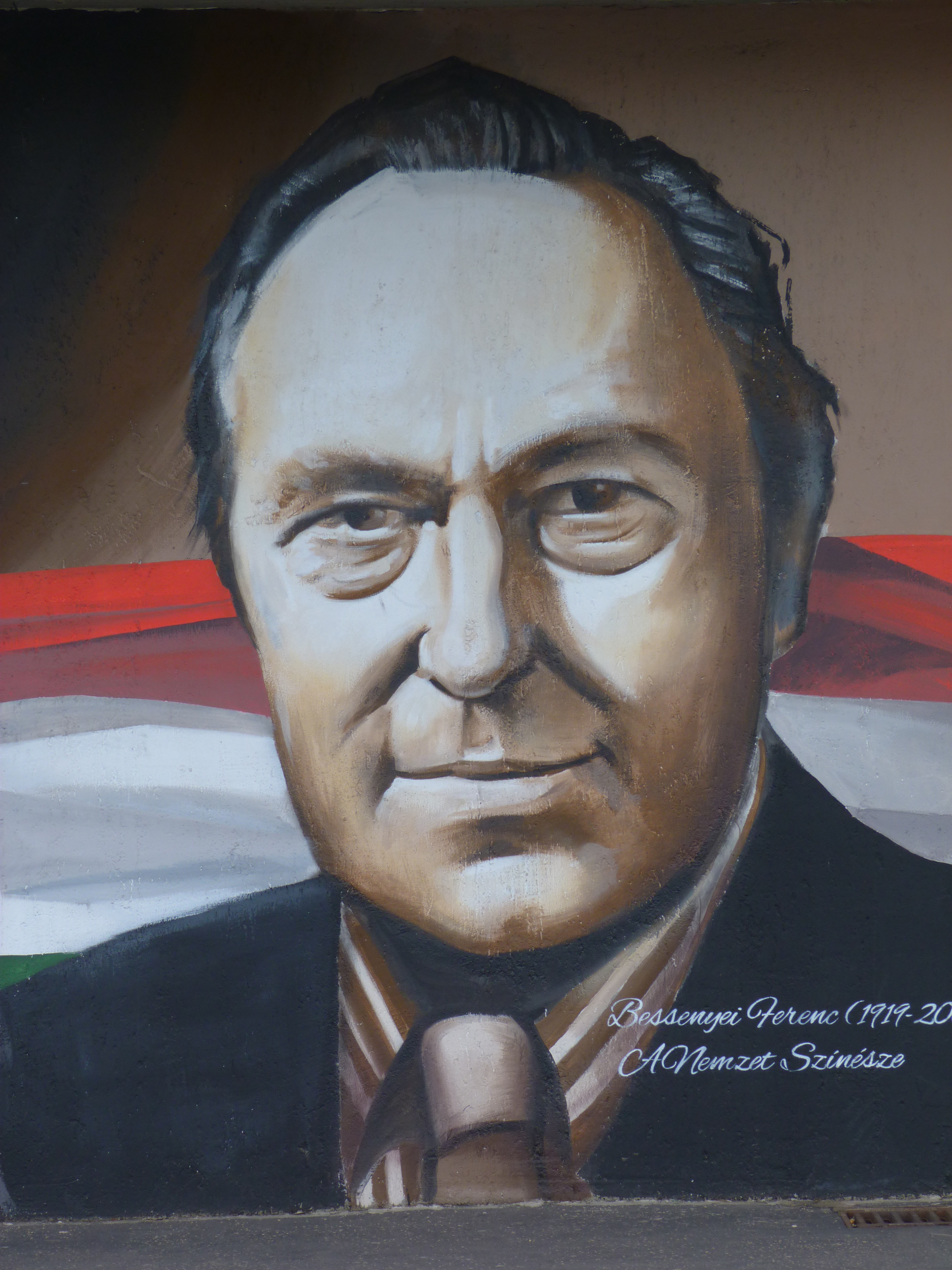
- Born: 10 February 1919; Hódmezővásárhely, Hungary
- Died: 27 December 2004 (aged 85); Lajosmizse, Hungary
- Occupation: Actor
- Years active: 1940–2001

Ferenc Bessenyei (10 February 1919 – 27 December 2004) was a Hungarian actor and singer. He began his career in the choir at National Theatre of Szeged in 1940 and became one of Hungary's most respected stage performers. As singer he appeared in My Fair Lady (as Higgins), Fiddler on the Roof (as milkman Tevje) and Zorba the Greek (as Zorba). He was a tall man with a deep, powerful voice. He was elected to the Revolutionary Council of the Hungarian Intelligentsia in the 1956 revolt and was not allowed to perform for two years. He was awarded the "Actor of Nation" in 2000. He appeared in 75 films between 1960 and 2001. His second wife was Hédi Váradi actress.

== Selected filmography ==
- Full Steam Ahead (1951)
- Underground Colony (1951)
- Storm (1952)
- Battle in Peace (1952)
- Kiskrajcár (1953)
- Young Hearts (1953)
- Under the City (1953)
- A Strange Mask of Identity (1955)
- Professor Hannibal (1956)
- By Order of the Emperor (1957)
- Fever (1957)
- Be True Until Death (1960)
- Alba Regia (1961)
- Sunshine on the Ice (1961)
- The Brute (1961)
- Drama of the Lark (1963)
- The Testament of Aga Koppanyi (1967)
- Stars of Eger (1968)
- Franz Liszt. Dreams of love (1970)
- A fekete város (televíziós sorozat) (1972)
- Hugo the Hippo (1973)
