= For Whom the Larks Sing =

1959 film

- Directed by: László Ranódy
- Written by: Jozsef Darvas
- Based on: For Whom the Larks Sing by Jozsef Darvas
- Produced by: József Bajusz
- Starring: Géza Tordy; Klári Tolnay; Erzsi Somogyi; Antal Páger
- Cinematography: István Pásztor
- Edited by: Mihály Morell
- Music by: Endre Szervánszky
- Production company: Mafilm
- Release date: 16 September 1959
- Running time: 97 minutes
- Country: Hungary
- Language: Hungarian

For Whom the Larks Sing (Hungarian: Akiket a pacsirta elkísér) is a 1959 Hungarian drama film directed by László Ranódy and starring Géza Tordy, Klári Tolnay, Erzsi Somogyi and Antal Páger. It was shot at the Hunnia Studios in Budapest. The film's sets were designed by the art director József Romvári. It was screened at the 1959 Venice Film Festival.

== Cast ==
- Éva Pap as Julis
- Géza Tordy as Varga Sándor
- Klári Tolnay as Mrs. Csiszér
- Gábor Agárdi as Mr. Csiszér
- Erzsi Somogyi as Mrs. Süle
- József Bihari as Mr. Süle
- Margit Dajka as Sándor's Mother
- Antal Páger as Schoolmaster
- László Bánhidi as Seer
- Nusi Somogyi as Mrs. Palugyai

== Bibliography ==
- Liehm, Mira & Liehm, Antonín J. The Most Important Art: Soviet and Eastern European Film After 1945. University of California Press, 1980.
- Petrie, Graham. History Must Answer to Man: The Contemporary Hungarian Cinema. Corvina Kiadó, 1981.
- Rîpeanu, Bujor. (ed.) International Directory of Cinematographers, Set- and Costume Designers in Film: Hungary (from the beginnings to 1988). Saur, 1981.
