= Dani (film) =

1957 film

- Directed by: Mihály Szemes
- Written by: Marianne Szemes; Mihály Szemes
- Produced by: Mária Matejka; Ottó Föld
- Starring: Klári Tolnay; Margit Bara; Antal Páger
- Cinematography: Barnabás Hegyi
- Edited by: Sándor Boronkay
- Music by: Zdenkó Tamássy
- Production company: Hunnia Filmstúdió
- Release date: 14 November 1957
- Running time: 85 minutes
- Country: Hungary
- Language: Hungarian

Dani is a 1957 Hungarian drama film directed by Mihály Szemes and starring Klári Tolnay, Margit Bara and Antal Páger. It was shot at the Hunnia Studios in Budapest. The film's sets were designed by the art director István Básthy.

== Cast ==
- Klári Tolnay as Aranka
- Margit Bara as Eszter
- Antal Páger as Borbás
- Ferenc Kállai as Géza
- György Weiser as Dani
- Béla Barsi
- László Csákányi
- László Csörgei
- Gábor Mádi Szabó
- Piri Peéry
- Sándor Peti
- Sándor Tompa
- Tibor Benedek
- Sándor Deák
- Alfréd Deésy
- Ildikó Forrás
- Marienne Forrás
- József Gáti
- Zoltán Gera
- János Görbe
- József Kutas
- Lenke Lorán
- Ila Lóth
- Ági Margitai
- Hédi Temessy

== Bibliography ==
- Balski, Grzegorz . Directory of Eastern European Film-makers and Films 1945-1991. Flicks Books, 1992.
- Rîpeanu, Bujor. (ed.) International Directory of Cinematographers, Set- and Costume Designers in Film: Hungary (from the beginnings to 1988). Saur, 1981.
