= The Brute (1961 film) =

1961 film

- Directed by: Zoltán Fábri
- Written by: Zoltán Fábri; Imre Sarkadi
- Starring: Ferenc Bessenyei
- Cinematography: Ferenc Szécsényi
- Edited by: Mária Szécsényi
- Production company: Hunnia Filmstúdió
- Release date: 25 May 1961
- Running time: 96 minutes
- Country: Hungary
- Language: Hungarian

The Brute (Hungarian: Dúvad) is a 1961 Hungarian film directed by Zoltán Fábri. It was entered into the 1961 Cannes Film Festival.

== Cast ==
- Ferenc Bessenyei - Ulveczki Sándor
- Tibor Bitskey - Gál Jani
- Mária Medgyesi - Monoki Zsuzsi
- Béla Barsi - Bíró
- György Györffy - Balogh
- Pál Nádai - Földházi
- Sándor Siménfalvy - Monoki, Zsuzsi apja
- Antal Farkas - Szûcs
