= Accroche-coeur =

1987 film

- Directed by: Chantal Picault
- Written by: Chantal Picault; Monique Lange (Novel)
- Release date: 25 November 1987
- Running time: 90 minutes
- Country: France
- Language: French

Accroche-coeur (english: Hanging Heart) is a 1987 French romantic crime drama film directed by Chantal Picault.

== Cast ==
- Patrick Bauchau ... Léo
- Sandrine Dumas ... Sara
- László Szabó
- Elisabeth Kaza
- Zazie Delem
- Catherine Guillot
- Catherine Herold
- Sean MacKeon
- Georges Lunghini
- David Martin
- Jean-Christophe Pastrain
- Alice Piguet
- Juliette Sané
- Corinne Tell
- Dolorès Torres
