= Rudolf Somogyvári =

Hungarian actor

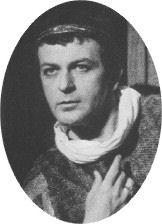
- Born: 30 November 1916; Budapest, Austria-Hungary
- Died: 27 September 1976 (aged 59); Budapest, Hungary

Rudolf Somogyvári (born Rezső Skoda 1916–1976) was a Hungarian actor. He was the voice of Mz / X in the hit Hungarian animated program The Mézga Family.

== Selected filmography ==
- Viki (1937)
- Two Prisoners (1938)
- Money Is Coming (1939)
- Accident (1955)
- A Strange Mask of Identity (1955)
- Professor Hannibal (1956)
- Spiral Staircase (1957)
- Three Nights of Love (1967)
- Stars of Eger (1968)
- Temperate Zone (1970)
- Csínom Palkó (1973)
- Pikemen (1975)
