= Heinrich Balasch =

Austrian cinematographer

- Born: March 2, 1899; Vienna, Austria
- Years active: 1929-1937

Heinrich Balasch was an Austrian cinematographer.

== Selected filmography ==
- Dreyfus (1930)
- The Song of Life (1931)
- The False Millionaire (1931)
- The Trunks of Mr. O.F. (1931)
- Here's Berlin (1932)
- King of Hotels (1932)
- The Magic Top Hat (1932)
- Voices of Spring (1933)
- The Dream Car (1934)
- The Homely Girl (1935)
- I Can't Live Without Music (1935)
- Address Unknown (1935)
- The New Landlord (1935)
- Miss President (1935)
- Shipwrecked Max (1936)

== Bibliography ==
- Youngkin, Stephen. The Lost One: A Life of Peter Lorre. University Press of Kentucky, 2005.
