= Fourteen Lives =

1954 film

- East German poster
- Directed by: Zoltán Fábri
- Written by: Tibor Tardos
- Produced by: László Végh
- Starring: Béla Barsi; Bertalan Solti; László Bánhidi
- Cinematography: Barnabás Hegyi
- Edited by: Mária Szécsényi
- Music by: György Ránki
- Production company: Hunnia Filmgyár
- Distributed by: Progress Film
- Release date: 2 September 1954
- Running time: 98 minutes
- Country: Hungary
- Language: Hungarian

Fourteen Lives (Hungarian: Életjel) is a 1954 Hungarian drama film directed by Zoltán Fábri and starring Béla Barsi, Bertalan Solti and László Bánhidi. It was shot at the Hunnia Studios in Budapest. The film's sets were designed by the art director József Pán.

== Cast ==
- Béla Barsi as Ambrus
- Bertalan Solti as Bóna
- László Bánhidi as Varjas Tóni
- Lajos Rajczy as Balázs József
- János Görbe as Szika
- Katalin Berek as Virágh Anna
- Iván Darvas as Jancsó
- Sándor Kömíves as Balogh
- Géza Sándor as Sanyi
- Sándor Peti as Gáspár
- József Vándor as Gossner
- János Körmendi as Krivász
- Sándor Siménfalvy as Márkus
- Pál Beszterczei as Pali
- Sándor Szabó as Deák
- Károly Kovács as Cseke
- László Ujlaky as Bottyán
- Magda Kohut as Simon Sára
- Imre Sinkovits as Borsa
- Sándor Pethes as Szász
- István Dózsa as Svana
- Erzsi Somogyi as Varjasné
- Klári Létay as Ambrusné
- Noémi Apor as Jancsóné
- Gábor Rajnay as Orvos
- Mária Keresztessy as Baloghné
- Lajos Pándy as Kádas
- László Misoga as Lakos
- Béla Károlyi as member of the rescue team

== Bibliography ==
- Cunningham, John. Hungarian Cinema: From Coffee House to Multiplex. Wallflower Press, 2004.
- Iordanova, Dina. Cinema of the Other Europe: The Industry and Artistry of East Central European Film. Wallflower Press, 2003.
- Jones, Derek (ed.) Censorship: A World Encyclopedia. Routledge, 2001.
