= Gyula Szabó =

Hungarian actor (1930–2014)

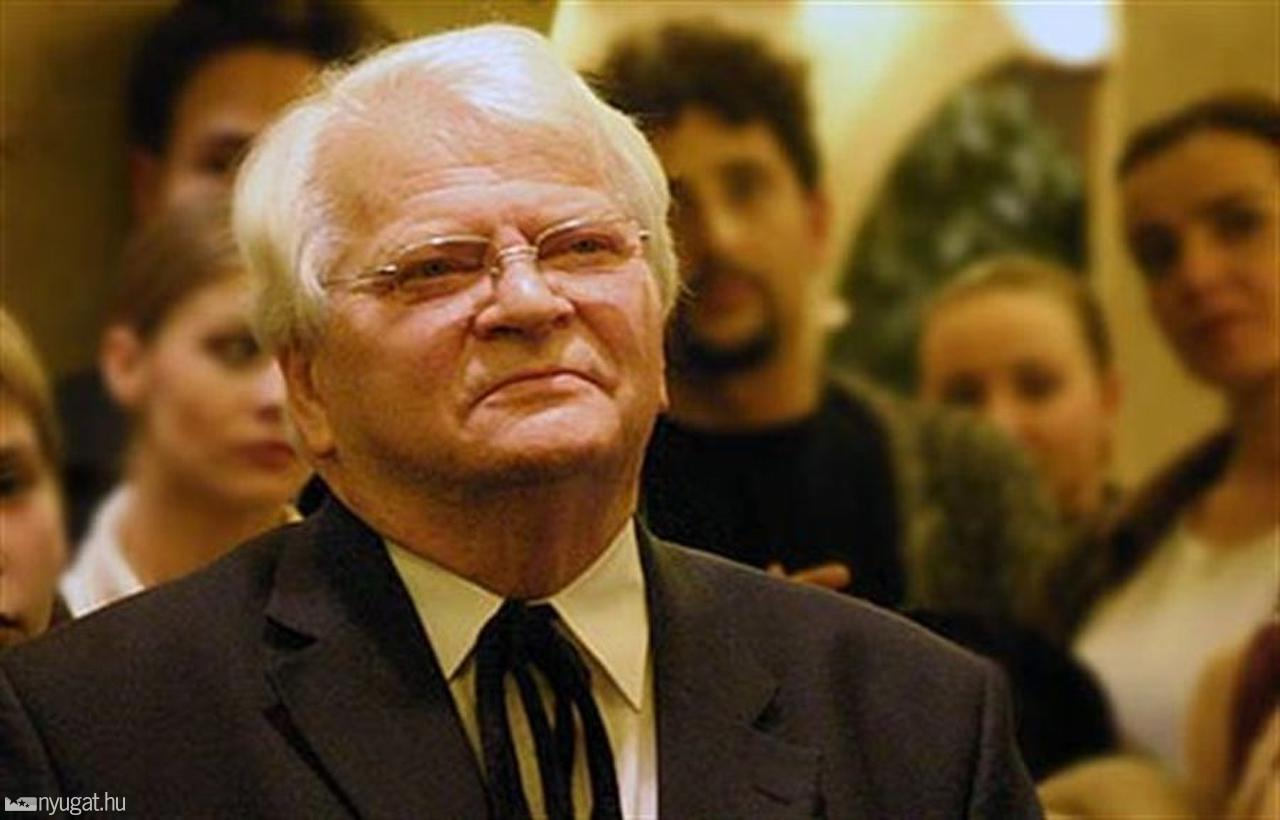
- Born: 15 July 1930; Kunszentmárton, Hungary
- Died: 4 April 2014 (aged 83); Budapest, Hungary
- Occupation: actor

Gyula Szabó (15 July 1930 – 4 April 2014) was a Hungarian actor. He won two Mari Jászai Prizes. He appeared in forty movies between 1953 and 2002. He is best known for appearing in movies such as Ifjú szívvel (1953), Kiskrajcár (1953), Egy pikoló világos (1955), A tizedes meg a többiek (1965) and Defekt (1977). He was the Hungarian voice of the eponymous American television character Columbo and the narrator of the Hungarian Folktales animated television series. He was born in Kunszentmárton, Jász-Nagykun-Szolnok County.

Szabó died on 4 April 2014 at the age of 83.

== Selected filmography ==
- At the End of September (1942)
- Lóránd Fráter (1942)
- Black Dawn (1943)
- Muki (1944)
- Boy or Girl? (1944)
- Wedding March (1944)
- Love Travels by Coach (1955)
- Iron Flower (1958)
- Yesterday (1959)
