= Yesterday (1959 film) =

1958 film

- Directed by: Márton Keleti
- Written by: Imre Dobozi
- Starring: Zoltán Makláry
- Cinematography: Barnabás Hegyi
- Release date: 1959
- Country: Hungary
- Language: Hungarian

Yesterday (Hungarian: Tegnap) is a 1959 Hungarian drama film directed by Márton Keleti. It was entered into the 1st Moscow International Film Festival.

== Plot ==
Set during the Hungarian Revolution of 1956, the film follows a military platoon ordered to suppress a public demonstration in a provincial town. Under the command of Lieutenant Csendes, the soldiers confront a crowd of protesters and prepare to open fire. However, one of the soldiers, Szusza Kis, joins the demonstrators, while Csendes hesitates after recognizing a childhood friend among the civilians. Unable to carry out the order, he refuses to shoot, and the platoon ultimately withdraws without using force.

== Cast ==
- Zoltán Makláry as Csendes Imre
- Ferenc Ladányi as Szabó alezredes
- Sándor Pécsi
- Antal Páger as Mácsay, volt foldbirtokos
- László Ungváry as Man in Mackintosh (as László Ungvári)
- János Görbe as Pandúr
- Tibor Bitskey
- Gyula Szabó as Szusza-Kis (as ifj. Szabó Gyula)
- Béla Barsi
- László Bánhidi (as Bánhidy László)
- Hilda Gobbi
- László Kozák
