= Adoption (film) =

1975 Hungarian drama film

- Video release poster
- Directed by: Márta Mészáros
- Written by: Gyula Hernádi; Márta Mészáros; Ferenc Grunwalsky
- Starring: Katalin Berek; Gyöngyvér Vigh; Péter Fried
- Cinematography: Lajos Koltai; Márta Mészáros
- Edited by: Éva Kármentő
- Music by: György Kovács
- Distributed by: Kino Video
- Release dates: February 1975 (Berlin); 25 September 1975
- Running time: 89 minutes
- Country: Hungary
- Language: Hungarian

Adoption (Hungarian: Örökbefogadás) is a 1975 Hungarian drama film directed by Márta Mészáros. It was entered into the 25th Berlin International Film Festival, where it won the Golden Bear. The film was also selected as the Hungarian entry for the Best Foreign Language Film at the 48th Academy Awards, but was not accepted as a nominee.

== Plot summary ==
The film tells the story of Kata, a 42-year-old female factory worker who lives alone near a residential care facility for abandoned children. She has a relationship with a married man, with whom she would like to have a child. He declines the offer, and the woman becomes interested in Anna, a girl from the children's home. She helps Anna marry her boyfriend, and decides to adopt a baby from the orphanage.

As Mészáros' Nine Months (1976), Adoption starts with a semi-documentary sequence shot inside a factory.

== Cast ==
- Katalin Berek as Csentesné – Kata (as Berek Kati)
- Gyöngyvér Vigh as Bálint Anna
- Péter Fried as Sanyi
- László Szabó as Jóska
- István Szőke
- Flóra Kádár as Erzsi, Jóska's wife
- Janos Boross as Anna apja
- Erzsi Varga as Anna anyja
- István Kaszás as Intézetigazgató
- Anikó Kiss
- Zsófi Mészáros
- Judit Felvidéki
- Irén Rácz
- Erika Jozsi as (as Józsa Erika)
- András Szigeti

== Reception ==
Adoption was the first female directed film to win the Golden Bear at the Berlin International Film Festival. According to Sight and Sound, the film is Mészáros's best-known film.

A restored version of Adoption was screened in the Berlinale Classics program at the 69th Berlin International Film Festival.

== See also ==
- List of submissions to the 48th Academy Awards for Best Foreign Language Film
- List of Hungarian submissions for the Academy Award for Best Foreign Language Film
