= By Order of the Emperor =

1957 film

- Directed by: Frigyes Bán
- Written by: Tibor Barabás
- Produced by: Jenő Katona
- Starring: Ferenc Bessenyei; Éva Ruttkai; Sándor Deák
- Cinematography: Jean Badal
- Edited by: Mária Szécsényi
- Music by: Rezső Kókai
- Production company: Mafilm
- Release date: 21 November 1957
- Running time: 96 minutes
- Country: Hungary
- Language: Hungarian

By Order of the Emperor (Hungarian: A császár parancsára) is a 1957 Hungarian historical drama film directed by Ferenc Bessenyei, Éva Ruttkai and Sándor Deák. It was shot at the Hunnia Studios in Budapest and on location around Sopron. The film's sets were designed by the art director Imre Sőrés.

== Synopsis ==
A young Hungarian revolutionary in late eighteenth century Pest, then part of the Austrian Empire, is prominent in a secret society. A rival for the love of Lotte, a bookseller's daughter, informs on him to the authorities leading to his arrest and a death sentence being imposed.

== Cast ==
- Ferenc Bessenyei as Hajnóczy
- Éva Ruttkai as Lotte
- Sándor Deák as Laczkovics
- Ferenc Kállai as Sehy
- Zoltán Makláry as Kohlmayer
- Gábor Mádi Szabó as Fodor
- Tibor Molnár as Mihály
- György Pálos as Martinovics Ignác
- Lajos Pándy as Szentmarjay
- István Somló as Barco generális
- Erzsi Somogyi as Kohlmayerné
- Irén Sütő as Martineau Mária
- László Bánhidi as Nyéki Németh
- László Hlatky as Ruzsicska
- Lajos Rajczy as Sáray Szabó
- János Rajz as Stitz
- John Bartha as The Austrian soldier who trying to trap Laczkovics

== Bibliography ==
- Balski, Grzegorz . Directory of Eastern European Film-makers and Films 1945–1991. Flicks Books, 1992.
- Homoródy, József. Magyar film, 1948–1963. Filmtudományi Intézet, 1964.
