= László Bánhidi =

Hungarian actor

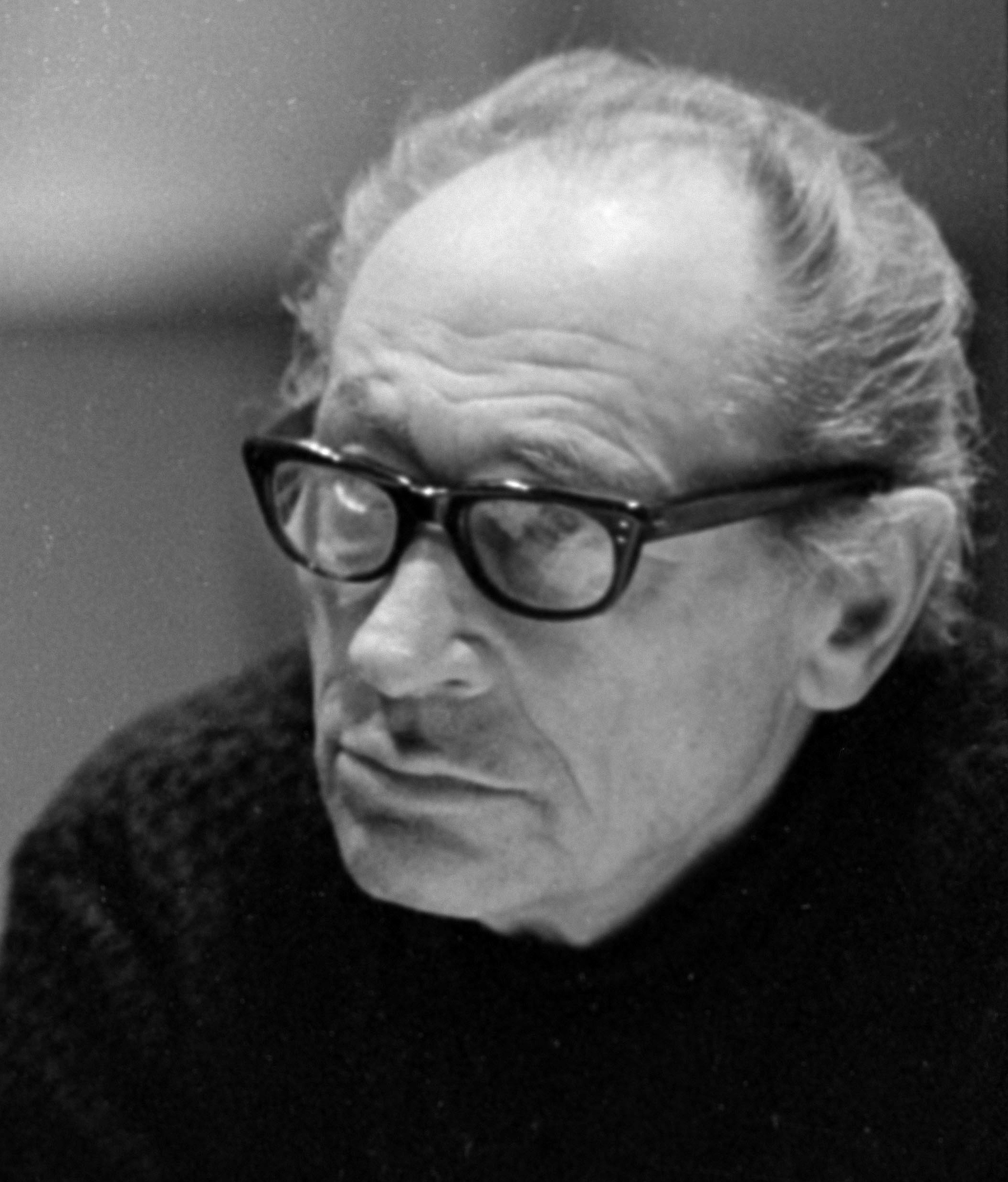
- Born: 1 March 1906; Szatmárnémeti, Austria-Hungary
- Died: 12 September 1984 (aged 78); Budapest, Hungary

László Bánhidi (1906–1984) was a Hungarian actor.

== Career ==
Bánhidi (until 1908, before his name was Hungarianized, Mudris) was the son of Antal János Károly, a cadastral engineer. His father was born in Jászárokszállás in 1876, and his mother's name was Bánhidi (Bánhidi Paulina). His mother, Terézia Nagy, was born in Pankota, Arad County. László studied theology, then enrolled at the Academy of Performing Arts, graduating in 1928. He performed at the National Chamber Theater from 1929 to 1930, and in Kassa between 1930 and 1931. He then moved on to Ungvár and Munkács between 1931 and 1934, and in 1934 he signed a contract with the Bethlen Square Theater in Budapest. From 1937 to 1939, he was a member of the Hungarian Theater, then a member of the Belvárosi Theater for a year, from 1939 to 1940. In 1941, he signed a one-year contract with the National Theater in Miskolc, and from 1942 to 1944, he performed at the Vidám Színpad. He became a member of the National Theater in 1944, but also performed at the Madách Theater at the same time. In 1949, he rejoined the Belvárosi Theater, and between 1951 and 1957, he performed at the Hungarian People's Army Theater. In 1957, he signed a contract with the Petőfi Theater, and between 1960 and 1963, he was a member of the Jókai Theater. In 1963, he signed with the Thália Theater, where he performed until his retirement in 1966.

Even as a retired actor, he regularly appeared at the Pesti Theater. He also frequently appeared in feature films, television films, and radio plays.

== Selected filmography ==
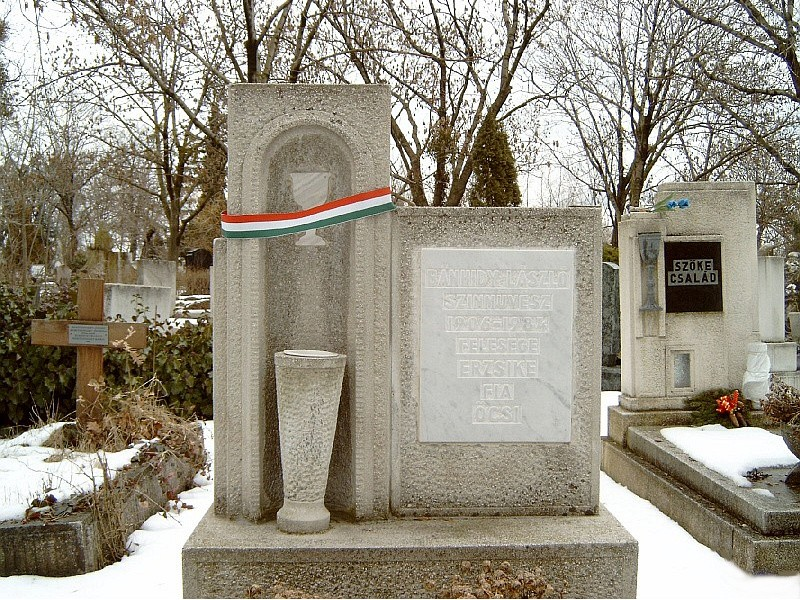
László Bánhidi grave

- Song of the Cornfields (1947)
- Prophet of the Fields (1947)
- Treasured Earth (1948)
- Singing Makes Life Beautiful (1950)
- The Land Is Ours (1951)
- Storm (1952)
- Baptism of Fire (1952)
- Battle in Peace (1952)
- Keep Your Chin Up (1954)
- Fourteen Lives (1954)
- Springtime in Budapest (1955)
- Ward 9 (1955)
- Love Travels by Coach (1955)
- Dollar Daddy (1956)
- By Order of the Emperor (1957)
- Suburban Legend (1957)
- A Bird of Heaven (1958)
- Iron Flower (1958)
- The Smugglers (1958)
- Yesterday (1959)
- For Whom the Larks Sing (1959)
- Crime at Dawn (1960)
- I'll Go to the Minister (1962)
- Fagyosszentek (1962)
- Tales of a Long Journey (1963)
- Lady-Killer in Trouble (1964)
- The Moneymaker (1964)
- Háry János (1965)
- Car Crazy (1965)
- The Corporal and Others (1965)
- The Healing Water (1967)
- Stars of Eger (1968)
- The Upthrown Stone (1969)
- The Pagan Madonna (1981)
- Do not Panic, Major Kardos (1982)
