= Tibor Bitskey =

Hungarian television and film actor (1929-2015)

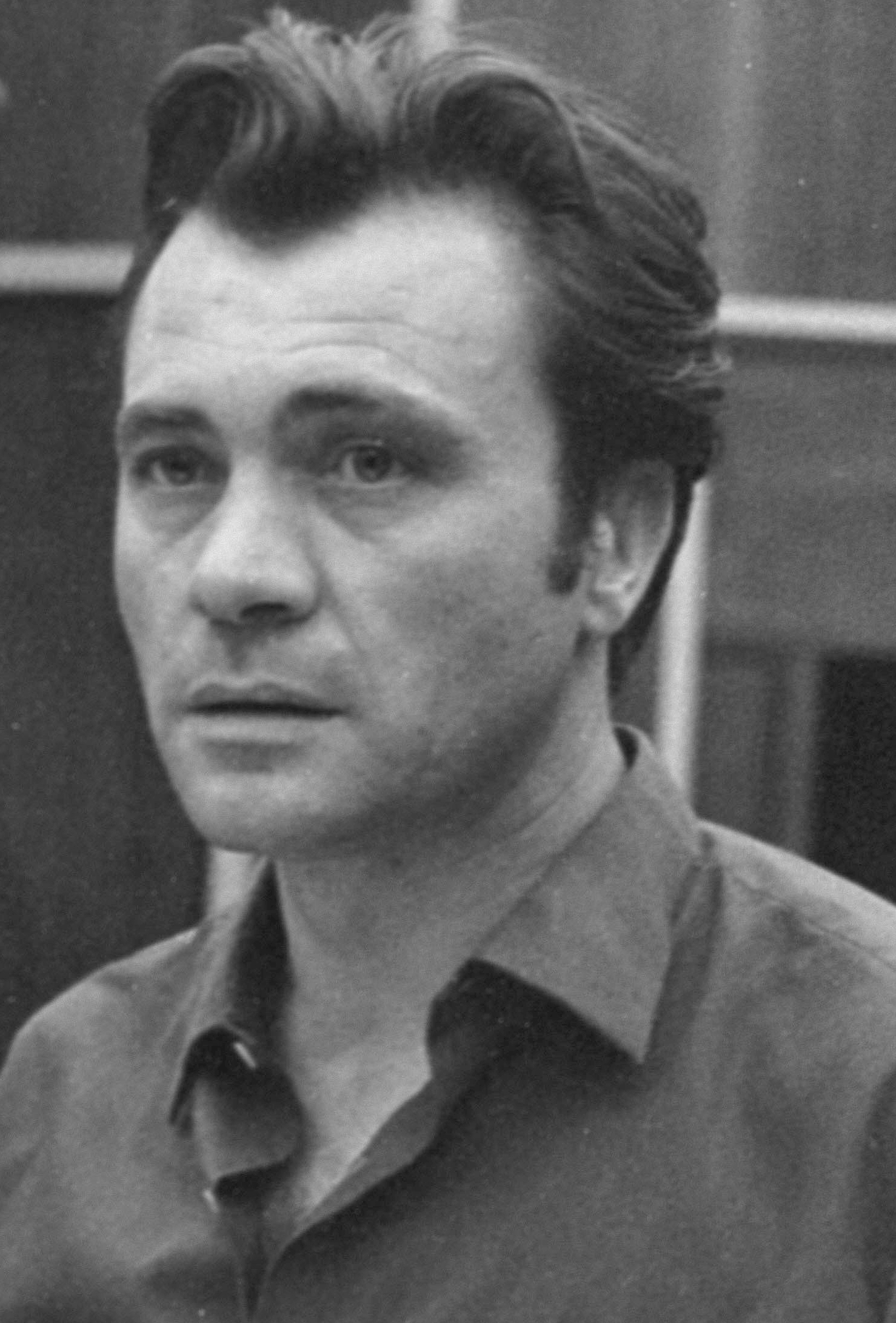
- Born: 20 September 1929; Rákoskeresztúr, Kingdom of Hungary
- Died: 2 February 2015 (aged 85); Budapest, Hungary
- Years active: 1952-2009
- Parent(s): Bitskey Lajos; Altziebler Erzsébet

Tibor Bitskey (20 September 1929 – 2 February 2015) was a Hungarian television and film actor.

== Partial filmography ==
- Föltámadott a tenger (1953)
- A harag napja (1953)
- Kiskrajcár (1953) - Madaras Jóska falubelije (uncredited)
- Rakoczy's Lieutenant (1954) - Bornemissza János hadnagy
- Különös ismertetöjel (1955)
- A Glass of Beer (1955) - Kincse Marci
- Yesterday (1959) - Csendes Imre fõhadnagy
- Virrad (1960) - Csendes fõhadnagy
- A Husband for Susy (1960) - Jóska, a vita egyik oka
- Be True Until Death (1960) - Gyéres
- Semmelweis (1961) - Diák
- The Brute (1961) - Gál Jani
- Párbeszéd (1963) - Színész
- A köszívü ember fiai (1965) - Baradlay Ödön
- Zoltán Kárpáthy (1966) - Kis Miska
- Egy magyar nábob (1966) - Kis Miska
- Niet inej cesty (1968) - Kossuth
- Stars of Eger (1968) - Mekcsey István
- Szemtöl szembe (1970) - Gyukits Dezsõ
- Szerelmi álmok - Liszt (1970)
- A gyilkos a házban van (1971) - Tímár százados (magyar hang) (voice)
- Love (1971) - Feri
- A szerelem határai (1974) - Dr. Varga
- A néma dosszié (1978) - Kovács ügyvéd
- The Fortress (1979) - Wagner
- The Little Fox (1981) - Storyteller (voice)
- Idö van (1986) - Laci Bodor
- Banánhéjkeringö (1987) - Bregyán alezredes
- Diary for My Lovers (1987)
- Túsztörténet (1989) - Apa
- Diary for My Mother and Father (1990)
- Melodráma (1991) - Pista bá
- Magic Hunter (1994) - Surgeon
- The Conquest (1996) - Elõd vezér
- Sobri, ponyvafilm (2002) - Kopátsy József fõbíró
- Illúziók (2009) - Grandpa (final film role)

== Awards ==
- Kossuth Prize (2000)
- Order of Merit of Hungary (2013)

== Bibliography ==
- Brown, Karl William. Regulating Bodies: Everyday Crime and Popular Resistance in Communist Hungary, 1948-1956. ProQuest, 2007.
