= Béla Barsy =

Hungarian actor

Béla Barsi
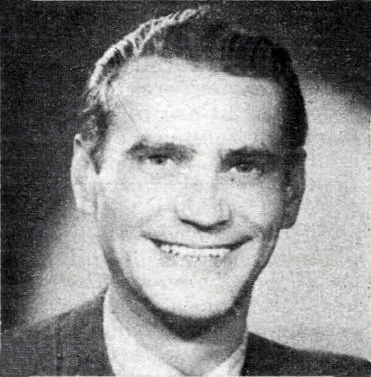
- Béla Barsy in 1943.
- Born: 24 January 1906; Budapest, Austria-Hungary
- Died: 30 April 1968 (aged 62); Budapest, Hungary
- Occupation: Actor
- Years active: 1952-1968

Béla Barsy, also credited as Barsi (24 January 1906 – 30 April 1968) was a Hungarian actor. He appeared in more than sixty films from 1952 to 1968.

== Filmography ==
Year	Title	Role	Notes
1952	Storm	Illés Kálmán	
1953	A harag napja	Szedlacsek Józsi	
1954	Fourteen Lives	Ambrus	
1954	Simon Menyhért születése	Espersit József	
1956	Merry-Go-Round	Pataki István	
1956	Professor Hannibal	Menyus	
1956	Az eltüsszentett birodalom	Szépapa	
1957	Two Confessions		
1957	Sunday Romance	Kontra	
1957	Spiral Staircase	Ilosfay	
1957	Dani		
1958	A Bird of Heaven	Tanító	
1958	Iron Flower	Gedeon	
1958	The House Under the Rocks	Sógor	
1958	Micsoda éjszaka!		Uncredited
1958	The Smugglers	Román gazda	
1958	Édes Anna	Ficsor	
1959	Yesterday		
1959	A harminckilences dandár	Papp István	
1959	Sleepless Years	Mihalik	
1959	Kard és kocka		
1959	Bogáncs	Dodó	
1959	Szerelem csütörtök		
1959	Szombattól hétföig	Dózi	
1959	Pár lépés a határ	Útkaparó	
1960	A megfelelö ember	Somos igazgató	
1960	Három csillag	Világosító	
1960	Hosszú az út hazáig		
1960	Két emelet boldogság		
1960	Az arc nélküli város		
1960	A Noszty fiú esete Tóth Marival		
1961	The Brute	Bíró	
1961	Puskák és galambok		
1961	Két félidö a pokolban		Uncredited
1962	Áprilisi riadó	Blaskó képviselõ	
1962	Húsz évre egymástól	Bálint szaktársa	
1962	Fagyosszentek	Miske bácsi	
1962	The Man of Gold	Sándorovics Cirill	
1963	Cantata	Ambrus apja	
1963	Asszony a telepen	Szurdoki	
1963	Germinal		Uncredited
1965	My Way Home	Lézengõ magyar katona	
1965	Húsz óra	Tanácselnök	
1965	A köszívü ember fiai	Lánghy, lelkész	
1965	Zöldár	Párttitkár	
1966	The Round-Up	Foglár	
1966	Az elsö esztendö	Hajnal	
1966	Zoltán Kárpáthy	Tarnavári	
1966	Egy magyar nábob	Tarnaváry	Uncredited
1968	Fiúk a térröl	Katona nagyapja	
1986	Keserü igazság	Barczen	(final film role)
