= Sándor Deák =

Hungarian actor

- Born: 5 December 1909; Brassó, Austria-Hungary (now Brașov, Romania)
- Died: 13 June 2002 (aged 92); Budapest, Hungary
- Occupation: Actor
- Years active: 1939–1989 (film & TV)

Sándor Deák (1909–2002) was a Hungarian stage, film and television actor. On stage he featured at a number of different theatre venues. A character actor, he appeared in supporting roles in cinema during the 1950s onwards.

== Selected filmography ==
- The Perfect Man (1939)
- Déryné (1951)
- Honesty and Glory (1951)
- The Land Is Ours (1951)
- Baptism of Fire (1952)
- Storm (1952)
- Semmelweis (1952)
- The First Swallows (1953)
- The State Department Store (1953)
- Under the City (1953)
- Rakoczy's Lieutenant (1954)
- Dani (1957)
- By Order of the Emperor (1957)
- Spiral Staircase (1957)
- The House Under the Rocks (1958)
- A Bird of Heaven (1958)
- The Poor Rich (1959)
- The Moneymaker (1964)
- The Healing Water (1967)

== Bibliography ==
- Goble, Alan. The Complete Index to Literary Sources in Film. Walter de Gruyter, 1999.
- Nemeskürty, István & Szántó, Tibor. A Pictorial Guide to the Hungarian Cinema, 1901-1984. Helikon, 1985.
