= Arnold Sziklay =

Hungarian filmmaker

Arnold Sziklay (flourished circa 1896) was the first Hungarian filmmaker.
