= Erzsi Somogyi =

Hungarian actress (1906–1973)

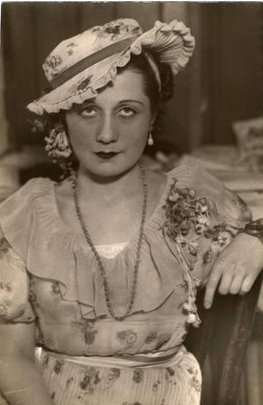
- Somogyi in 1930
- Born: 10 September 1906; Kolozsvár, Austria-Hungary
- Died: 10 July 1973 (aged 66); Budapest, Hungary
- Occupation: Actress
- Years active: 1927–1971 (film and TV)

Erzsi Somogyi (10 September 1906 – 10 July 1973) was a Hungarian stage and film actress. She was born in Transylvania in what subsequently became part of Romania after the First World War. She was active on the stage in Budapest for many decades, while also making film appearances. She was married to the actors János Pásztor and the writer Béla Gádor.

== Selected filmography ==
- Kiss Me, Darling (1932)
- I Can't Live Without Music (1935)
- The Village Rogue (1938)
- Rosemary (1938)
- Fourteen Lives (1954)
- A Strange Mask of Identity (1955)
- Dollar Daddy (1956)
- By Order of the Emperor (1957)
- A Bird of Heaven (1958)
- Szerelem csütörtök (1959)
- For Whom the Larks Sing (1959)

== Bibliography ==
- Bolton, Lucy & Wright Julie Lobalzo (ed.) Lasting Screen Stars: Images that Fade and Personas that Endure. Springer, 2016.
- Fekete, Márton. Prominent Hungarians: Home and Abroad. Szepsi Csombor Literary Circle, 1979.
