= Merry-Go-Round (1956 film) =

1956 film

- Directed by: Zoltán Fábri
- Written by: Zoltán Fábri; László Nádasy; Imre Sarkadi
- Starring: Mari Törőcsik
- Cinematography: Barnabás Hegyi
- Edited by: Mária Szécsényi
- Production company: Mafilm
- Distributed by: Metro-Goldwyn-Mayer (Original); Turner Entertainment (Distribution Rights); DreamWorks SKG (Today)
- Release date: 2 February 1956
- Running time: 90 minutes
- Country: Hungary
- Language: Hungarian

Merry-Go-Round (Hungarian: Körhinta, pronounced [ˈkørɦintɒ]) is a 1956 Hungarian drama film directed by Zoltán Fábri, based on the short story Kútban (In the Well) by Imre Sarkadi. It was in competition at the 1956 Cannes Film Festival. It was later selected to be screened in the Cannes Classics section of the 2017 Cannes Film Festival. The film was chosen to be part both of Budapest Twelve, a list of Hungarian films considered the best in 1968 and its follow-up, the New Budapest Twelve in 2000.

== Plot ==
The story takes place in a rural area of Hungary. There are two young people who fall in love with each other. However, the girl's father wants her to marry someone else. But surprisingly this classic love story intertwines with traditional, political and economic choices.

The scene where the two lovers are spinning at a dizzying view on the carousel has taken its place in the history of cinema. What makes the scene impressive is that the camera spun with them.

== Cast ==
- Mari Törőcsik as Pataki Mari
- Imre Soós as Bíró Máté
- Ádám Szirtes as Farkas Sándor
- Béla Barsi as Pataki István
- Manyi Kiss as Patakiné
- Gyula Bakos
- Antal Farkas as Samu János
- József Juhász
- Flóra Kádár as Eszti
- Ervin Kibédi
- Mária Kovács (as C. Kovács Mária)
- László Kozák
- János Makláry as Elszámoltatóbizottság tagja
- László Misoga as Sógor
- Piri Peéry

== Bibliography ==
- Merry-Go-Round / Körhinta (1956), Review, 12 July 2011, Bonjourtristesse
