= Frigyes Bán =

Hungarian film director

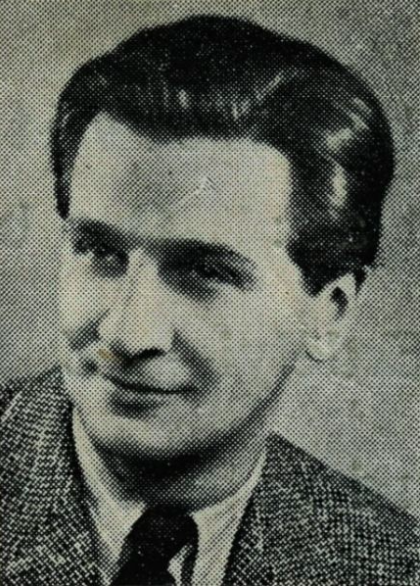
- Born: 19 June 1902; Kassa, Austria-Hungary
- Died: 30 September 1969 (aged 67); Budapest, Hungary
- Occupations: Director, Screenwriter
- Years active: 1938–1967 (film)

Frigyes Bán (19 June 1902 – 30 September 1969) was a Hungarian screenwriter and film director. His wife was the actress Éva Vass.

== Selected filmography ==
- The Unquiet Night (1940)
- Matthew Arranges Things (1940)
- One Night in Transylvania (1941)
- Háry János (1941)
- The Last Song (1942)
- Guard House Number 5 (1942)
- Cadet Love (1942)
- The Night Girl (1943)
- Disillusion (1943)
- Quite a Lad (1943)
- The Night Serenade (1943)
- The Three Doves (1944)
- Prophet of the Fields (1947)
- Treasured Earth (1948)
- The Land Is Ours (1951)
- Baptism of Fire (1952)
- Semmelweis (1952)
- The First Swallows (1953)
- Rakoczy's Lieutenant (1954)
- By Order of the Emperor (1957)
- Spiral Staircase (1957)
- St. Peter's Umbrella (1958)
- A Quiet Home (1958)
- The Poor Rich (1959)
- A Husband for Susy (1960)
- Sunshine on the Ice (1961)
- I'll Go to the Minister (1962)
- The Moneymaker (1964)
- Car Crazy (1965)
- The Healing Water (1967)

== Bibliography ==
- Buranbaeva, Oksana & Mladineo, Vanja. Culture and Customs of Hungary. ABC-CLIO, 2011.
