= Ferenc Kállai =

Hungarian actor

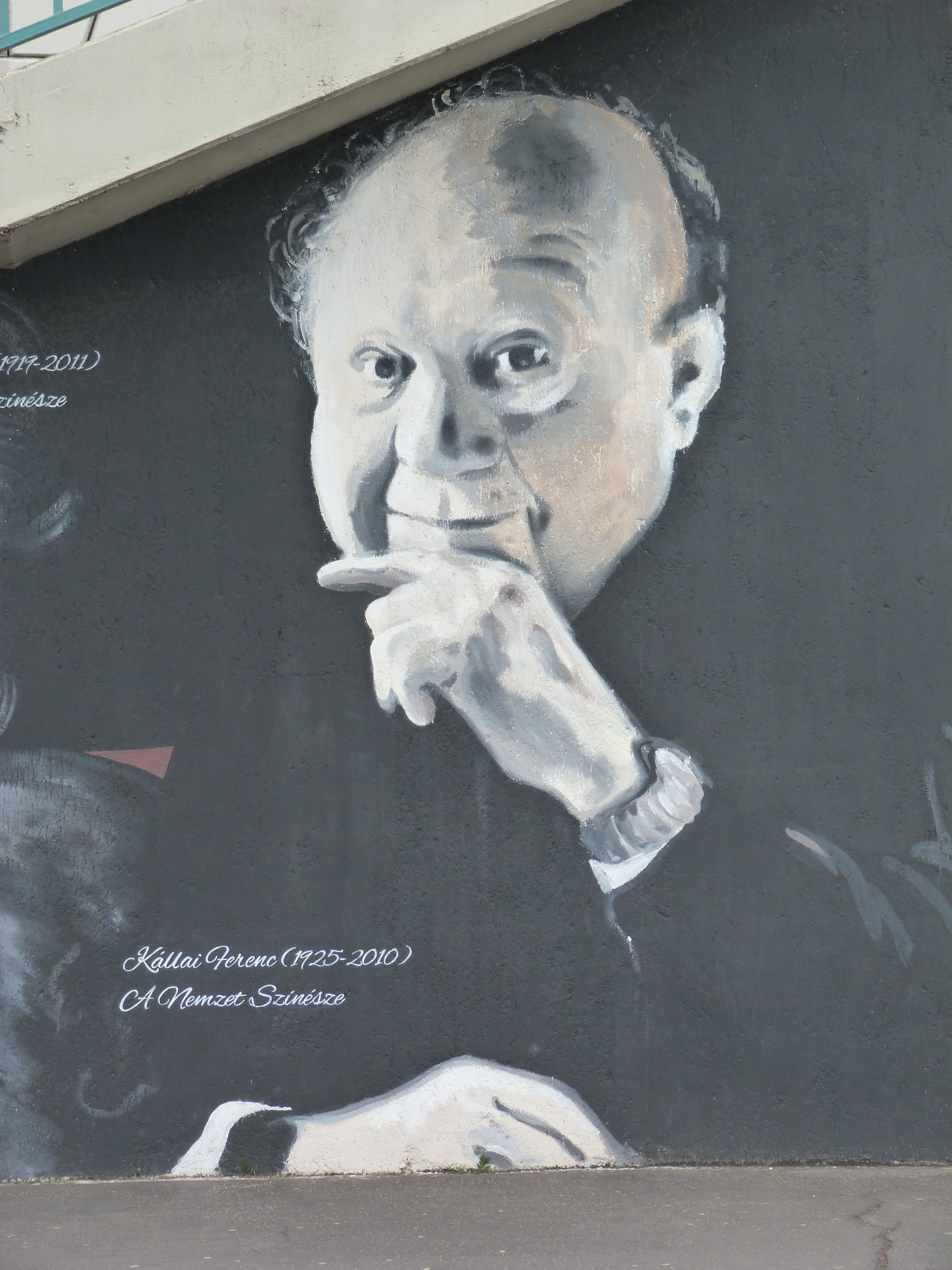
- Born: 4 October 1925; Gyomaendrőd, Hungary
- Died: 11 July 2010 (aged 84); Budapest, Hungary
- Occupation: Actor
- Years active: 1945–2008

Ferenc Kállai (4 October 1925 – 11 July 2010) was a Hungarian film actor.

== Selected filmography ==
Film
Year	Title	Role	Notes
1953	Kiskrajcár		
1953	The First Swallows		
1956	The Bridge of Life		
1957	By Order of the Emperor		
1957	Dani		
1969	The Witness		
1974	The Pendragon Legend		
1975	Mrs. Dery Where Are You?		
1985	The Red Countess		
1986	Cat City		Voice
1987	Season of Monsters		
1989	The Pregnant Papa		
1997	Out of Order		
1999	6:3 Play It Again Tutti		
2000	Werckmeister Harmonies		
2006	Relatives		
