= György Cserhalmi =

Hungarian actor

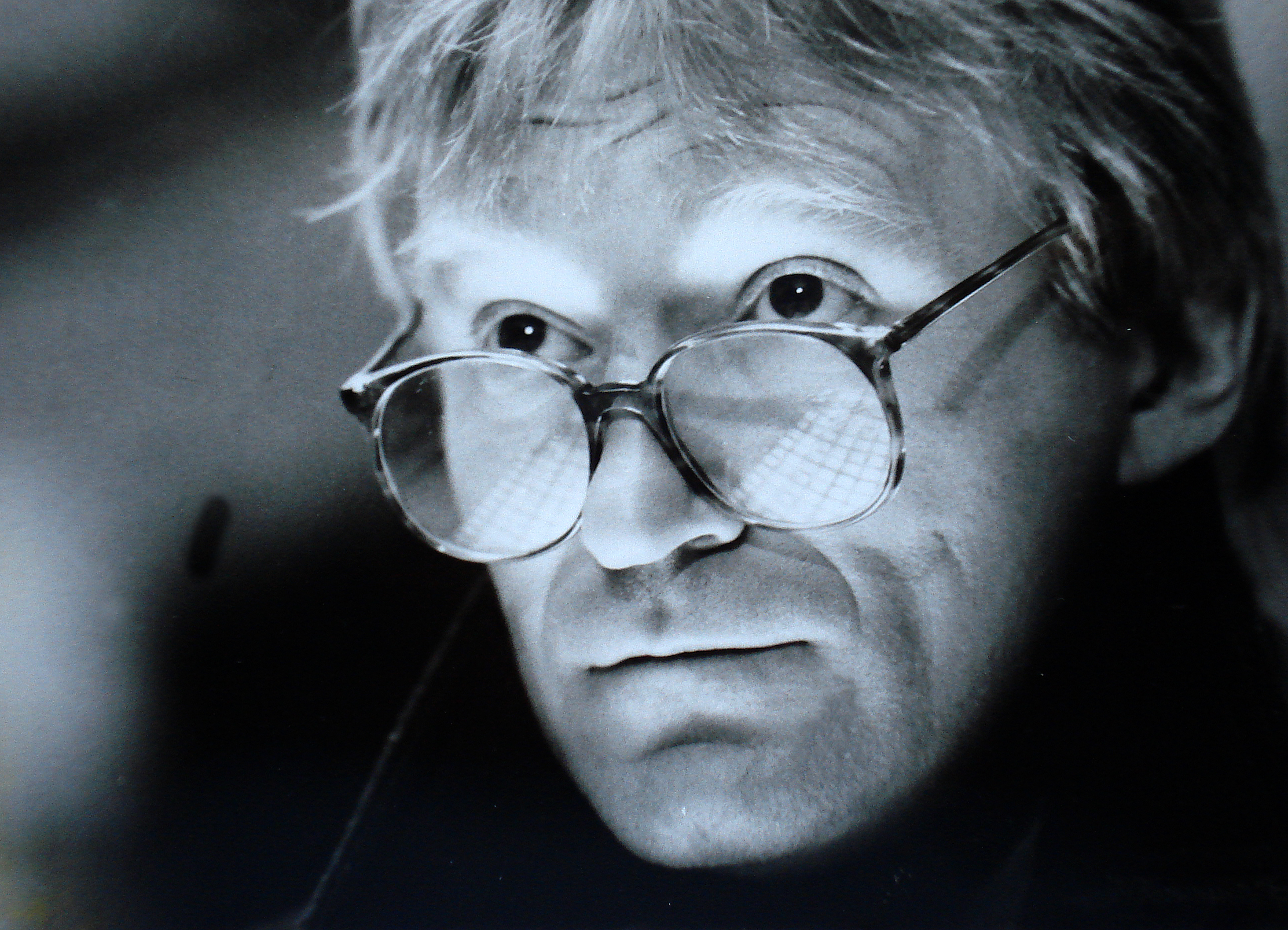
- Born: 17 February 1948 (age 78); Budapest, Hungary
- Occupation: Actor

György Cserhalmi (born 17 February 1948, in Budapest) is a Hungarian actor. He graduated from the Actors Academy in 1971. He is also the founder of the Labdater Theatre in the Globe cultural centre.

== Early life ==
He was born to Gyula Cserhalmi and Magda Varga. Through his opera singer mother, he was introduced to the world of the arts from an early age. On his mother's side, he is also related to former Hungarian Prime Minister Béla Miklós.

Originally, Cserhalmi planned to apply for a fencing coach training program. However, after learning that students were immediately conscripted into military service, he changed his mind. Instead, he enrolled at the Academy of Theatre and Film Arts in Budapest, graduating in 1971. As an actor, he regarded Zoltán Latinovits and Lajos Őze as his greatest role models.

== Stage career ==
After graduating, Cserhalmi joined the Csokonai Theatre in Debrecen. Between 1972 and 1975, he performed at the Petőfi Theatre in Veszprém, before joining the National Theatre in 1977.

In 1983 he became one of the founding members of the Katona József Theatre in Budapest, where he remained until 1989.

In 1991, he co-founded the Labdatér Theatre with Tamás Balikó. After spending six months in the United States, he joined the newly established Új Színház in 1994, and later became a member of the Radnóti Theatre company.

Since 2013, he has been a member of the Vörösmarty Theatre in Székesfehérvár, where he has worked both as an actor and as a stage director.

== Filmography ==
He has appeared in more than 200 films and, for a period, was a regular collaborator of acclaimed Hungarian director Miklós Jancsó. He also worked extensively with renowned filmmakers including István Szabó, Károly Makk, Péter Bacsó, Sándor Sára and Márta Mészáros. German filmmaker Wim Wenders once named him among the ten greatest actors in the world.

Some of his most significant film roles include:

- 1973 – Johnny Corncob, directed by Marcell Jankovics
- 1976 – The Fifth Seal, directed by Zoltán Fábri
- 1976 – Man Without a Name Directed by László Lugossy
- 1981 – Mephisto, directed by István Szabó
- 1982 – The Vulture, directed by Ferenc András
- 2002 – The Bridgeman, directed by Géza Bereményi
- 2002 – Perlasca – Un eroe Italiano directed by Alberto Negrin
- 2003 – Kontroll, directed by Nimród Antal
- 2004 – Želary, directed by Ondřej Trojan
- 2008 – Eszter's Inheritance, directed by József Sipos
- 2012 – Dear Betrayed Friends, directed his daughter Sára Cserhalmi

In addition to his acting career, he has recorded several music albums and has appeared in numerous musical stage productions.

Hungarian publicist Róbert Puzsér has frequently argued in interviews that Cserhalmi represents one of the missed opportunities in Hungarian cinema. He has criticized the cultural and film establishment for failing, over several decades, to provide the actor with leading roles worthy of his talent.

== Political Activism ==
On 15 March 1989, during a peaceful opposition demonstration in front of the former headquarters of Hungarian Television he publicly read the movement's jointly drafted 12 Points.

He has since stated that he became deeply disappointed with Hungary's democratic transition, believing that very few of the movement's original demands were ultimately fulfilled.

In 2009, he stood as a candidate in the 2009 European Parliament election on the joint electoral list of Politics Can Be Different alongside actress Andrea Fullajtár.

Although he has continued to speak publicly on political and social issues, he has not taken on an active political role since then.

== Prizes ==
- Kossuth Prize (1990)
- SZOT prize (1988)
- Elizabeth prize (1987)
- Noteworthy artist (1986)
- Balazs Bela prize (1982)

In 2014, alongside Tibor Bitskey, he was awarded the title of Actor of the Nation, one of Hungary's highest honours for performers.

== Personal life ==
He was married to actress Erzsébet Cserhalmi. Their daughter, Sára is a film director.

He lives in the village of Kékkút near the Lake Balaton.

In 2020, he was diagnosed with cancer. Over the following five years, he underwent nine life-saving operations, including the removal of his gallbladder, duodenum, and part of his pancreas. He ultimately made a full recovery after a long and demanding rehabilitation.
