= Hédi Váradi =

Hungarian actress (1929–1987)

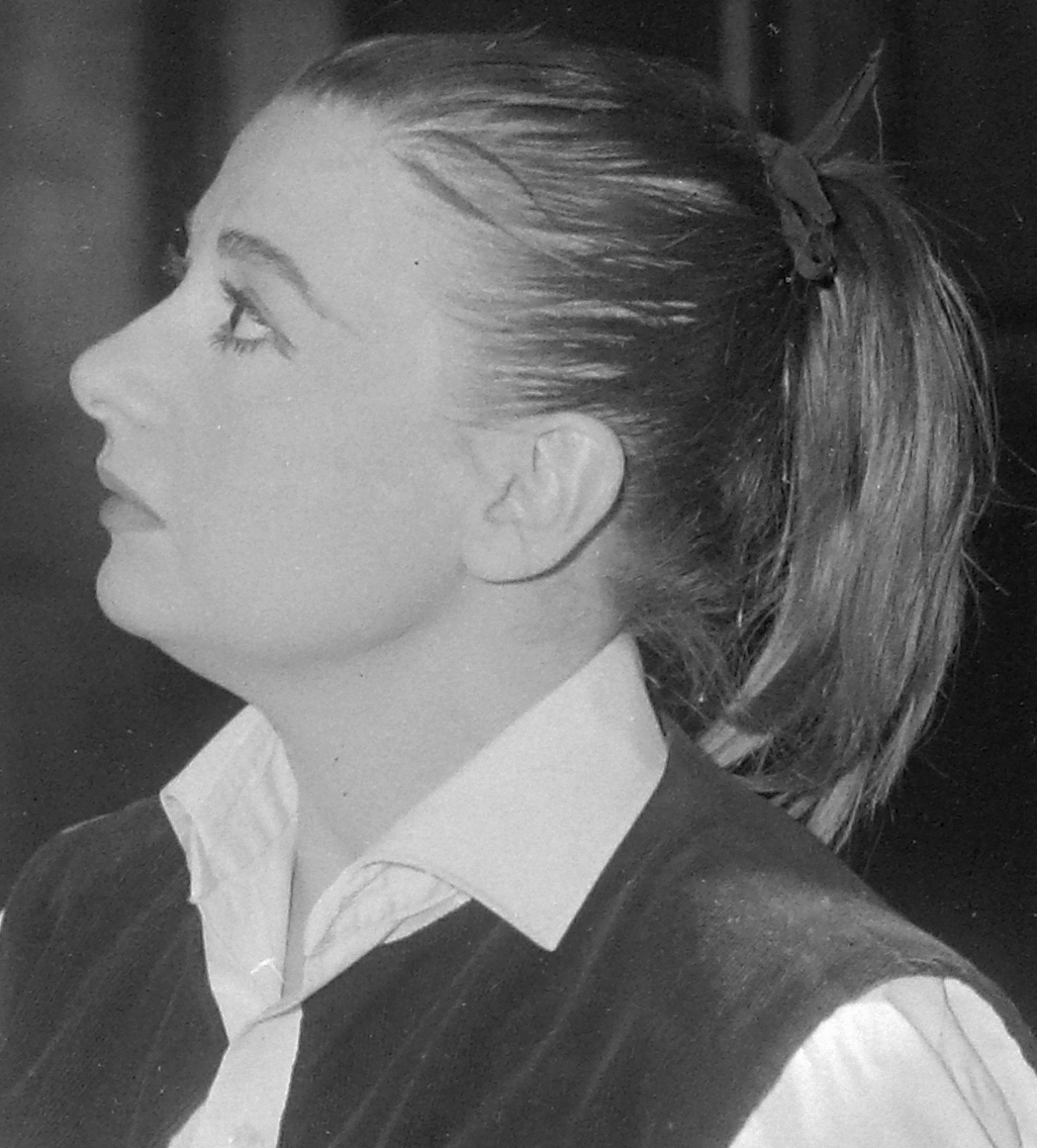
- Váradi in 1961
- Born: Váradi Hédi; 22 September 1929; Újpest, Kingdom of Hungary
- Died: 11 April 1987 (aged 57); Budapest, Hungary
- Occupation: Actress

Hédi Váradi (22 September 1929 – 11 April 1987) was a Hungarian actress.

== Biography ==
At the age of 18, Hédi took acting lessons from the Hungarian acting teacher Kálmán Rózsahegyi at the Academy of Drama and Film in Budapest. In her classes, she met other types of artists such as Berek Kati and Imre Soós.

She was for a long time married to Ferenc Bessenyei, but the couple later divorced. After refusing life-saving surgery, she later died from a serious illness. She was laid to rest at the Kerepesi Cemetery in Budapest.

== Personal life ==
After 1952, Hédi started working in the Madách Theatre in Budapest, and from 1964, she worked in the National Theatre until her death. Her forceful personality and deep, catching style of play made excellent comedy and drama roles. She was famous for her role in Shakespeare's comedy play A Midsummer Night's Dream as Titania.

== Major theatre roles ==
- Romeo and Juilet - Juliet
- Caesar and Cleopatra - Cleopatra (1955)
- Paradise Lost - Mira
- The Tragedy of Man - Eve
- After the Fall - Maggie
- Yegor Bulychov and Others - Kszenyija

== Acting roles ==
=== Filmography ===
- Singing Makes Life Beautiful (1950)
- Kiskrajcár (1953)
- Föltámadott a tenger (parts I-II. (1953)
- Ifjú szívvel (1953)
- Mese a tizenkét találatról (1956)
- A tettes ismeretlen (1957)
- Adventure in Gerolstein (1957)
- Éjfélkor (1957)
- Vasvirág (1958)
- Micsoda éjszaka (1958)
- Kölyök (1959)
- Fapados szerelem (1959)
- Egy régi villamos (1960)
- Alba Regia (1961)
- Puskák és galambok (1961)
- Délibáb minden mennyiségben (1961)
- Meztelen diplomata (1963)
- Már nem olyan időket élünk (1963)
- Az orvos halála (1965)
- Harlekin és szerelmese (1966)
- Kötelék (1967)
- Dóra jelenti (1968)
- Pokolrév(1969)
- Az örökös (1969)
- Nápolyt látni és... (1972)
- Az utolsó kézirat (1986)

=== Television films ===
- A mama (1958)
- Vihar a Sycomore utcában (1960)
- Hotel Germánia (1962)
- Ne éljek, ha nem igaz (1962)
- Gömböc (1962)
- Utak (1963)
- Az utolsó budai pasa (1963)
- Hivatalos utazás (1963)
- Menazséria (1964)
- Amerikából jöttem (1965)
- Az asszony és az igazság (1966)
- Oly korban éltünk 1-5. (1966–67)
- Germán vakáció (1967)
- Könnyű kis gyilkosság (1967)
- Három találkozás (1968)
- Nyomozók társasága (1969)
- Tévedni isteni dolog (1970)
- Asszonyok mesélik (1970)
- Kérem a következőt! (1974)
- Egy gazdag hölgy szeszélye (1986)

=== Animated films ===
- Snow White and the Seven Dwarfs (1937)

== Honours ==
On 11 April 2003, the 16th anniversary of Hédi's death, Deputy Mayor John Schiffer inaugurated a memorial ceremony to the actress at her former residence in the Hercegprímás District of Budapest on Second Street.
