= 25th Locarno Film Festival =

Film festival in Locarno, Switzerland

- Location: Locarno, Switzerland
- Founded: 1946
- Awards: Golden Leopard: Bleak Moments directed by Mike Leigh
- Artistic director: Moritz de Hadeln
- Festival date: Opening: 3 August 1972; Closing: 13 August 1972
- Website: Locarno Film Festival

Locarno Film Festival
- 26th 24th

The 25th Locarno Film Festival was held from 3 to 13 August 1972 in Locarno, Switzerland. Moritz de Hadeln took over as artistic director of the festival with his wife Erica Hadeln. Egon Gunther served on the jury and as a result his new film Her Third was screened out-of competition. Critic were happy with the festival's awards while also highlighting Family Life directed by Ken Loach and Fritz the Cat directed by Ralph Bakshi as stand outs.

Some noteworthy attendees included Douglas Sirk, American director Dick Richards and the head of Nemo films, This Brunner, who would later work with Sirk on his foundation.

The festival awarded its top prize, the Golden Leopard, to Bleak Moments directed by Mike Leigh. A new special prize celebrating the 25th Anniversary of the festival went to the Syrian film Al Fahd [The Leopard] directed by Nabil Maleh.

== Jury ==
The five-man jury included Moritz de Hadeln, Gordon Hitchens, and Egon Gunther.

== Official Sections ==
The following films were screened in these sections:

=== Main Program ===
Main Program / Feature Films In Competition

Original Title	English Title	Director(s)	Year	Production Country
Izpit	Examination	Gueorgui Dulguerov	1971	Bulgaria
Gola Savest		Milen Nikolov	1971	Bulgaria
A Pozdravuji Vlavlovsky	And Give My Love to the Swallows	Jaromil Jires	1972	Czech Republic
Absences Repetees	Repeated Absences	Guy Gilles	1972	France
Al Fahd	The Leopard	Nabil Maleh	1972	Syria
Bleak Moments		Mike Leigh	1971	Great Britain
Coup Pour Coup	Blow for Blow	Marin Karmitz		France
Crush Proof		François de Menil	1972	USA
Es Ist Eine Alte Geschichte	It's an Old Story	Lothar Warnecke	1972	Germany
Family Life		Ken Loach	1971	Great Britain
Jelenido	Present Indicative	Peter Bacso	1970	Hungary
La Familia Unida Esperando La Llegada De Hallewyn	The Family Waiting Together for Hallewyn's Arrival	Miguel Bejo	1971	Argentina
Liebe Mutter, Mir Geht Es Gut	Dear Mother, I'm Fine	Christian Ziewer	1972	Germany
Nachtschatten	Nightshade	Klaus Schilling	1972	Germany
Nevestka	Daughter-In-Law	Khodjakuli Narliev	1972	Soviet Union
Nocturno	Night	Hajo Gies	1971	Germany
Rak	Cancer	Charles Belmont	1972	France
Samskara	Funeral Rites	Pattabhi Rama Reddy	1971	India
Sharen Sviat		Gueorgui Dulguerov		Bulgaria
Stella Da Falla	Falla Star	Jacques Sandoz, Reto-Andrea Savoldelli		Switzerland
The Culpepper Cattle Co.		Dick Richards	1972	USA
වැලි කතර	Welikatara	D.B. Nihalsingha		Sri Lanka
Yasashi Nipponjin	Those Quiet Japanese	Yoichi Higashi	1971	Japan
Zaraza	Infection	Roman Zaluski	1972	Poland

Main Program / Feature Films Out of Competition

Original Title	English Title	Director(s)	Year	Production Country
Andrei Roublev		Andrei Tarkovsky	1966	Russia
Baimao Nü		Sang Hu		China
Der Dritte	Her Third	Egon Günther	1972	Germany
Fritz The Cat		Ralph Bakshi	1972	USA
Hosekraemmeren	The Hosecraemmer	Knud Leif Thomsen	1971	Denmark
In Nome Del Popolo Italiano	In the Name of the Italian People	Dino Risi	1971	Italia
Les Arpenteurs	The Surveyors	Michel Soutter	1972	Switzerland
Madarkak	Madidak	Géza Böszörményi	1971	Hungary
Questa Specie D'Amore	This Species of Love	Alberto Bevilacqua	1972	Italia
Senza Famiglia - Nullatenenti - Cercano Affetto	Without a Family - Nulotenneent - They Seek Affection	Vittorio Gassman	1972	Italia
Trotta	Trot	Johannes Schaaf	1971	Germany

=== Special Sections ===
Information: American Cinema
Original Title	English Title	Director(s)	Year	Production Country
Choice Chance Woman Dance		Ed Emshwiller	1971	USA
Fable-Safe		Center for Mass Communications, Columbia University Press.		USA
Film With Three Dancers		Ed Emshwiller	1970	USA
Hiroshima-Nagasaki, August 1945		Center for Mass Communications, Columbia University Press.		USA
The Hollywood Ten		John Berry	1950	USA
Marginal Projections
Der Tod Der Maria Malibran	The Death of Maria Malibran	Werner Schroeter		Germany
Heute Nache Oder Nie	Tonight or Never	Daniel Schmid		Switzerland
L'Amour	Love	Paul Morrissey	1972	USA
Salome		Werner Schroeter		Germany
Award-winning Short Films (Pre-Program)
Autobus Z Napisem Koniec	Bus with the Inscription End	Mariusz Walter		Poland
But They Said It - Didn'T They?		Joe McCarthy		Iceland
Circle Of Light: The Photography Of Pamela Bone		Anthony Rowland		Great Britain
Crne Baste	Black Base	Petar Ljubolew		Yugoslavia
Die Naegel	The Naegel	Kurt Aeschbacher		Switzerland
Flyway		Robin Lehman, R.O. Lehman		Great Britain
Lang Nho Ben Song Tra		Nghiem Phu My		Vietnam
Le Petit Heros De Phu Dong	The Little Hero of Phu Dong	Studio d'animation de Hanoi		Vietnam
Macka		Ztlatko Bourek		Yugoslavia
Maria Martinez Lopez		Dieter Glasmacher, Kurt Rosenthal		Germany
Meditation		Jordan Belson		USA
Nyugodtan Meghalni	To Die Calmly	Istvan Darday		Hungary
Psychodrama		Marek Piwowski		Poland
The Hutsman		Doug Jackson		Canada
Umno Selo	Smart	Donio Donev		Bulgaria
Vaters Grosse Liebe	Father's Great Love	Klaus Georgi		Germany
Wznosze Pomnik	I will Raise the Monument	Jerzy Jaraczewski		Poland

=== 25th Anniversary Retrospective ===
Retrospective of the 25th Anniversary of the Festival: Films Awarded In 1947
Original Title	English Title	Director(s)	Year	Production Country
Amiral Nakhimov		Vsevolod Poudovkine	1947	Russia
Antoine Et Antoinette	Antoine and Antoinette	Jacques Becker	1947	France
Farrebique		Georges Rouquier	1946	France
Gentleman'S Agreement		Elia Kazan	1947	USA
La Perla	The Pearl	Emilio Fernández	1947	Mexico
Les Maudits	The Damned	René Clément	1947	France
María Candelaria		Emilio Fernández	1943	Mexico
Monsieur Vincent		Maurice Cloche	1947	France
My Darling Clementine		John Ford	1946	USA
Na Objedu	At a Meal	Vetik Hadzismajlovic		Yugoslavia
Quai Des Orfevres	Orfevre Quai	Henri-Georges Clouzot	1947	France
Sciuscià	Shoeshine	Vittorio De Sica	1946	Italia
Specijalni Vlakovi	Special Trains	Krsto Papić		Yugoslavia

=== Swiss Information ===
Swiss Information
Original Title	English Title	Director(s)	Year	Production Country
Arise Like A Fire		Hans Jakob Siber	1972	Switzerland
Le Macaque	The Macaque	Daniel Suter	1972	Switzerland
Le Moulin Develey Sis A La Quielle	The Moulin Develey Sis a La Quielle	Claude Champion		Switzerland
Murmure	Murmur	Marcel Schupbach		Switzerland
Mädchenpensionat	Girls' Pension	Hannes Meier		Switzerland
Ruzo	Trick	Marc Michel		Switzerland
Tut Alles Im Fenstern, Eurem Herrn Das Licht Zu Ersparen	Do Everything in the Window to Save your Lord the Light	Daniel Schmid		Switzerland
Unterschätzen Sie Amerika Nicht	Do not Underestimate America	Sebastian Schroeder		Switzerland
Volksmund - Oder Man Ist Was Man Isst	Volksmund - Or you are What you Eat	Markus Imhoof		Switzerland
Wieviel Erde Braucht Der Mensch?	How Much Earth Does Humans Need?	Alex Sadkowsky		Switzerland
Zur Wohnungsfrage 1972	On the Home Question 1972	Hans Sturm		Switzerland

== Official Awards ==
=== International Jury ===
- Golden Leopard: BLEAK MOMENTS by Mike Leigh
- Silver Leopard: PRESENT INDICATIVE by Peter Bacso
- Bronze Leopard: SAMSKARA by Pattabhi Rama Reddy
- Festival’s 25th Anniversary Prize: AL FAHD [The Leopard] by Nabil Maleh
- International Jury special Mention: Sandy Ratcliff in FAMILY LIFE, A POZDRAVUJI VLAVLOVSKY by Jaromil Jires, DAUGHTER-IN-LAW by Khodjakuli Narliev

=== FIPRESCI Jury ===
- International Critics Award: PRESENT INDICATIVE by Peter Bacso

=== Youth Jury ===
- Youth Jury Prize: DIE NAEGEL by Kurt Aeschbacher, COUP POUR COUP by Marin Karmitz, BLEAK MOMENTS by Mike Leigh, SHAREN SVIAT by Gueorgui Dulguerov, FAMILY LIFE by Ken Loach

=== Festival’s 25th anniversary Jury ===
- Festival’s 25th Anniversary Special Prize: Freddy Buache, Vinicio Beretta, Cesare Zavattini
