= Young Hearts (1953 film) =

- Directed by: Márton Keleti
- Written by: Péter Bacsó
- Cinematography: György Illés
- Edited by: Zoltán Kerényi
- Music by: Tamás Bródy
- Production company: Magyar Filmgyártó Nemzeti Vállalat
- Release date: 9 April 1953
- Running time: 111 minutes
- Country: Hungary
- Language: Hungarian

Young Hearts (Hungarian: Ifjú szívvel, literally "young hearts") is a 1953 Hungarian comedy film directed by Márton Keleti and starring Gyula Gózon, Sándor Pécsi and Imre Soós.

== Cast ==
- Gyula Gózon as Dani nagypapa
- Sándor Pécsi as Dani Sándor
- Imre Soós as Dani János
- Kálmán Latabár as Matejka bácsi
- Ferenc Bessenyei as Varga, igazgató
- Endre Szemethy as Kuczogi bácsi
- Gyula Benkö as Csontos
- Gábor Rajnay as Gerlóczy
- Noémi Apor as Bogár Gizi
- Imre Sinkovits as Pataki, DISZ-titkár
- Violetta Ferrari as Florina
- Teri Földi as Szíves Kati
- Flóra Kádár as Rózsi
- Erzsi Lengyel as Szeder Margit
- Endre Gyárfás as Pogácsás Ferkó
- Gyula Szabó as Czobor
- György Kádár as Gellér
- Csaba Károlyi as Petõ
- Gyula Varga as Kasznár
- Jenõ Szirmay as Pedro
- Alfonzó as Mutatványos a Vidám Parkban
- János Dömsödi
- Márta Fónay as Kati anyja
- György Gonda
- György ifj. Gonda
- László Horváth
- Sándor Peti as Raktáros
- Sándor Tompa as Balogh papa
- Margit Földessy
- Zsuzsa Váradi

== Bibliography ==
- Károly Nemes. Miért jók a magyar filmek?: Tanulmányok. Magvetʺo, 1968.
