= The Annunciation (film) =

1984 film

The Annunciation (Angyali üdvözlet)
- A Crucifixion in Byzantium
- Directed by: András Jeles
- Written by: András Jeles; Imre Madách
- Starring: Péter Bocsor; Júlia Mérö; Eszter Gyalog
- Cinematography: Béla Ferenczy; Sándor Kardos
- Edited by: Margit Galamb; Zsuzsa Pósán
- Music by: István Márta
- Distributed by: Award Films
- Release date: 20 September 1984
- Running time: 100 min
- Country: Hungary
- Language: Hungarian

The Annunciation (Hungarian: Angyali üdvözlet) is a Hungarian film directed by András Jeles in 1984, based on The Tragedy of Man (1861) by Imre Madách.

== Plot summary ==
When Adam (Péter Bocsor) and Eve (Júlia Mérő), having succumbed to Lucifer's temptation, are cast out of the Garden of Eden, Adam holds Lucifer (Eszter Gyalog) to his promise, reminding him that "You said I would know everything!". So Lucifer grants Adam a dream of the world to come. In the dream, Adam becomes Djoser in Egypt; Miltiades in Athens; a wealthy Roman during the time of Jesus Christ; a knight called Tancred in Byzantium; Johannes Kepler in Prague; Danton in revolutionary Paris; and a nameless suitor in Victorian London. Guided by a deceptively sweet but ultimately contemptuous Lucifer, Adam confronts an endless procession of the horror of the human story involving rape, betrayal, savagery, mindless cruelty and fanaticism.

== Cast ==
- Péter Bocsor as Adam
- Júlia Mérő as Eve
- Eszter Gyalog as Lucifer
- György Belme
- Róbert Borók
- Attila Dobay
- Evelin Fehér

== Production ==
The film is entirely performed by children. It was photographed against the fields, forests, mesas and shores of southern Hungary. The Annunciation is made in Pasolini style.

== See also ==
- The Tragedy of Man, a 2011 animated film based on the same play
