= Flowers of Reverie =

1984 film

- Directed by: László Lugossy
- Written by: László Lugossy; István Kardos
- Starring: György Cserhalmi
- Cinematography: Elemér Ragályi
- Edited by: László Lugossy
- Release date: 1984
- Running time: 102 minutes
- Country: Hungary
- Language: Hungarian

Flowers of Reverie (Hungarian: Szirmok, virágok, koszorúk) is a 1984 Hungarian drama film directed by László Lugossy. It was entered into the 35th Berlin International Film Festival where it won the Silver Bear - Special Jury Prize.

== Cast ==
- György Cserhalmi as Majláth Ferenc, huszárfõhadnagy
- Grażyna Szapołowska as Mária, Majláth felesége
- Jiří Adamíra as Heinrich nagybácsi
- Bogusław Linda as Tarnóczy Kornél
- Péter Malcsiner as Tarnóczy Miklós
- Lajos Öze as Ezredes (as Õze Lajos)
- Angéla Császár as Mária magyar hangja (voice)
- Tibor Kristóf as Heinrich magyar hangja (voice)
- Sándor Szakácsi as Kornél magyar hangja (voice)
- Vilmos Kun as Börtönigazgató
- Mátyás Usztics as Rendõrparancsnok
- Kati Marton as Dada (as Marton Katalin)
- Frigyes Hollósi as Head Physician of Madhouse
