= Man Without a Name =

(The) Man Without a Name may refer to:

- Man Without a Name (1976 film), a Hungarian drama film
- Man Without a Name (1932 film), a German drama film
- The Man Without a Name (1943 film), a French drama film
- Peter Voss, Thief of Millions (1921 film) or The Man Without a Name, a German silent adventure film
