= 26th Berlin International Film Festival =

1976 film festival in West Berlin, Germany

- Festival poster
- Location: West Berlin, Germany
- Founded: 1951
- Awards: Golden Bear: Buffalo Bill and the Indians, or Sitting Bull's History Lesson
- Festival date: 25 June – 6 July 1976
- Website: Website

Berlin International Film Festival chronology
- 27th 25th

The 26th annual Berlin International Film Festival was held from 25 June to 6 July 1976. The Golden Bear was awarded to Buffalo Bill and the Indians, or Sitting Bull's History Lesson directed by Robert Altman.

The Japanese film In the Realm of the Senses by Nagisa Oshima was confiscated during the Berlinale premiere of the film and banned after a court hearing. Charlie Chaplin's 1957 film A King in New York was also screened at the festival.

== Juries ==
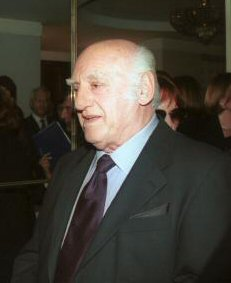
Jerzy Kawalerowicz, Jury President

The following people were announced as being on the jury for the festival:

=== Main Competition ===
- Jerzy Kawalerowicz Polish filmmaker and politician - Jury President
- Hannes Schmidt, West-German production designer
- Marjorie Bilbow, British writer
- Michel Ciment, French writer, journalist and film critic
- Guido Cinotti, Italian historian and essayist
- Georgiy Daneliya, Soviet filmmaker
- Wolf Hart, West-German director of photography
- Bernard R. Kantor, British publisher and academic
- Fernando Macotela, Mexican writer and film critic
- Márta Mészáros, Hungarian filmmaker
- Shūji Terayama, Japanese director, poet and playwright

== Official Sections ==
=== Main Competition ===
The following films were in competition for the Golden Bear award:

English title	Original title	Director(s)	Production Country
A Lost Life	Verlorenes Leben	Ottokar Runze	West Germany
America at the Movies		George Stevens Jr.	United States
Beach Guard in Winter	Čuvar plaže u zimskom periodu	Goran Paskaljević	Yugoslavia
Buffalo Bill and the Indians, or Sitting Bull's History Lesson		Robert Altman	United States
Canoa: A Shameful Memory	Canoa: memoria de un hecho vergonzoso	Felipe Cazals	Mexico
Caro Michele		Mario Monicelli	Italy
Death at an Old Mansion	本陣殺人事件	Yoichi Takabayashi	Japan
The Divine Nymph	Divina creatura	Giuseppe Patroni Griffi	Italy
Expropriation	Expropiación	Mario Robles	Venezuela, Peru
F comme Fairbanks		Maurice Dugowson	France
The Garden of Stones	باغ سنگی	Parviz Kimiavi	Iran
Horu: Munakata Shikō no sekai	彫る・棟方志功の世界	Takeo Yanagawa	Japan
Hotel Pacific	Zaklęte rewiry	Janusz Majewski	Poland, Czechoslovakia
Judge and the Forest	Следователят и гората	Rangel Vulchanov	Bulgaria
The Last Plantation	Fogo morto	Marcos Farias	Brazil
Long Vacations of 36	Las largas vacaciones del 36	Jaime Camino	Spain
The Man Who Fell to Earth		Nicolas Roeg	United Kingdom
Man Without a Name	Azonosítás	László Lugossy	Hungary
Mozart: Recordings of a Youth	Mozart – Aufzeichnungen einer Jugend	Klaus Kirschner	West Germany
Nights and Days	Noce i dnie	Jerzy Antczak	Poland
Ominide		Paolo Villani	Italy
Small Change	L'Argent de poche	François Truffaut	France
The Sudden Loneliness of Konrad Steiner	Die plötzliche Einsamkeit des Konrad Steiner	Kurt Gloor	Switzerland
Trains		Caleb Deschanel	United States
When the Poppies Bloom Again	Dokter Pulder zaait papavers	Bert Haanstra	Netherlands
The White Ship	Ак кеме	Bolotbek Shamshiyev	Soviet Union

=== Out of competition ===
- All the President's Men, directed by Alan J. Pakula (United States)

== Official Awards ==
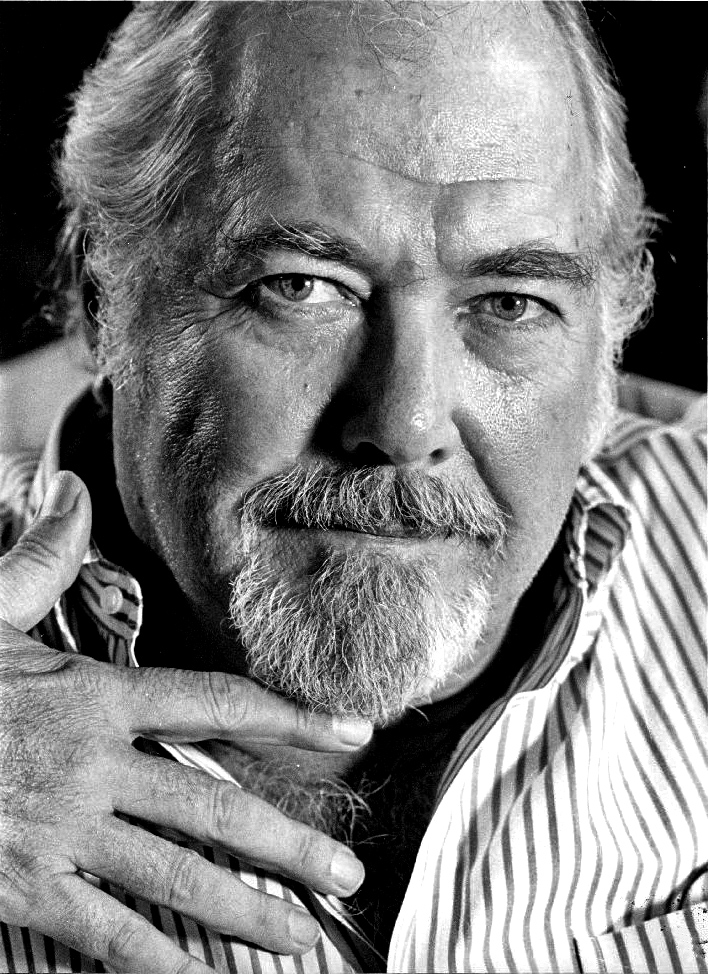
Robert Altman, winner of the Golden Bear at the event

The following prizes were awarded by the Jury:

- Golden Bear: Buffalo Bill and the Indians, or Sitting Bull's History Lesson by Robert Altman
- Silver Bear – Special Jury Prize: Canoa: A Shameful Memory by Felipe Cazals
- Silver Bear for Best Director: Mario Monicelli for Caro Michele
- Silver Bear for Best Actress: Jadwiga Barańska for Nights and Days
- Silver Bear for Best Actor: Gerhard Olschewski for A Lost Life
- Silver Bear for an outstanding single achievement: László Lugossy for Man Without a Name
- Silver Bear: The Garden of Stones by Parviz Kimiavi

== Independent Awards ==
=== FIPRESCI Award ===
- Letter from My Village by Safi Faye
- Long Vacations of 36 by Jaime Camino
- The Divine Plan by Nina Shivdasani
