= List of submissions to the 45th Academy Awards for Best Foreign Language Film =

1972 Best Foreign Language Film submissions

Highlights
- Oscar winner: (France) The Discreet Charm of the Bourgeoisie
- Submissions: 22
- Debuts: 1

This is a list of submissions to the 45th Academy Awards for Best Foreign Language Film. The Academy Award for Best Foreign Language Film was created in 1956 by the Academy of Motion Picture Arts and Sciences to honour non-English-speaking films produced outside the United States. The award is handed out annually, and is accepted by the winning film's director, although it is considered an award for the submitting country as a whole. Countries are invited by the Academy to submit their best films for competition according to strict rules, with only one film being accepted from each country.

For the 45th Academy Awards, twenty-two films were submitted in the category Academy Award for Best Foreign Language Film. Kuwait submitted a film for the first time. The five nominated films came from France, Israel, Spain, Sweden and the Soviet Union.

France won the eighth time with The Discreet Charm of the Bourgeoisie by Luis Buñuel, which was also nominated for Best Original Screenplay.

== Submissions ==
Submitting country	Film title used in nomination	Original title	Language(s)	Director(s)	Result
Belgium	The Lonely Killers	Les tueurs fous	French	Boris Szulzinger	Not nominated
Brazil	How Tasty Was My Little Frenchman	Como Era Gostoso o Meu Francês	Portuguese, French, Tupi	Nelson Pereira dos Santos	Not nominated
Bulgaria	The Goat Horn	Козият рог	Bulgarian	Metodi Andonov	Not nominated
Canada	The True Nature of Bernadette	La Vraie Nature de Bernadette	French	Gilles Carle	Not nominated
Denmark	Oh, to Be on the Bandwagon!	Man sku være noget ved musikken	Danish	Henning Carlsen	Not nominated
Egypt	My Wife and the Dog	زوجتي و الكلب	Arabic	Said Marzouk	Not nominated
France	The Discreet Charm of the Bourgeoisie	Le Charme discret de la bourgeoisie	French, Spanish	Luis Buñuel	Won Academy Award
West Germany	Trotta		German	Johannes Schaaf	Not nominated
Hungary	Present Indicative	Jelenidő	Hungarian	Péter Bacsó	Not nominated
India	Uphaar	उपहार	Hindi	Sudhendu Roy	Not nominated
Israel	I Love You Rosa	אני אוהב אותך רוזה	Hebrew	Moshé Mizrahi	Nominated
Italy	Roma		Italian, German, English, French, Latin, Spanish	Federico Fellini	Not nominated
Japan	Under the Flag of the Rising Sun	軍旗はためく下に	Japanese	Kinji Fukasaku	Not nominated
Kuwait	The Cruel Sea	فيلم بس يابحر	Arabic	Khalid Al Siddiq	Not nominated
Peru	Mirage	Espejismo	Spanish	Armando Robles Godoy	Not nominated
Poland	Pearl in the Crown	Perla w koronie	Polish	Kazimierz Kutz	Not nominated
Soviet Union	The Dawns Here Are Quiet	А зори здесь тихие	Russian, German	Stanislav Rostotsky	Nominated
Spain	My Dearest Senorita	Mi querida señorita	Spanish	Jaime de Armiñán	Nominated
Sweden	The New Land	Nybyggarna	Swedish	Jan Troell	Nominated
Switzerland	La Salamandre		French	Alain Tanner	Not nominated
Taiwan	Execution in Autumn	秋決	Mandarin	Li Hsing	Not nominated
Yugoslavia	The Master and Margaret	Majstor i Margarita	Serbo-Croatian, Italian	Aleksandar Petrović	Not nominated

== Sources ==
- Margaret Herrick Library, Academy of Motion Picture Arts and Sciences
