= Twenty Hours =

1965 film

- Directed by: Zoltán Fábri
- Written by: Miklós Köllõ; Ferenc Sánta
- Starring: Antal Páger
- Cinematography: György Illés
- Production company: Mafilm
- Release date: 3 November 1965
- Running time: 110 minutes
- Country: Hungary
- Language: Hungarian

Twenty Hours (Hungarian: Húsz óra, pronounced [ˈhuːs ˈoːrɒ]) is a 1965 Hungarian drama film directed by Zoltán Fábri. The film was selected as the Hungarian entry for the Best Foreign Language Film at the 38th Academy Awards, but was not accepted as a nominee. Fábri's film shared the Grand Prix with War and Peace and won the Prix FIPRESCI at the 4th Moscow International Film Festival.

== Cast ==
- Antal Páger as Chairman Jóska
- János Görbe as Anti Balogh
- Emil Keres as the reporter
- Ádám Szirtes as Béni Kocsis
- László György as Sándor Varga
- József Bihari as András Cuha
- Lajos Őze as Kiskovács
- János Makláry (credited as János Maklári) as György Vencel
- Károly Kovács as the count
- Gyula Bodrogi as the doctor
- Ági Mészáros as Terus
- Tibor Molnár as Máthé

== See also ==
- List of submissions to the 38th Academy Awards for Best Foreign Language Film
- List of Hungarian submissions for the Academy Award for Best Foreign Language Film
