= 141 Minutes from the Unfinished Sentence =

1975 film

- Directed by: Zoltán Fábri
- Written by: Tibor Déry
- Starring: András Bálint
- Cinematography: György Illés
- Release date: 6 February 1975
- Running time: 140 minutes
- Country: Hungary
- Language: Hungarian

141 Minutes from the Unfinished Sentence (Hungarian: 141 perc A befejezetlen mondatból) is a 1975 Hungarian drama film directed by Zoltán Fábri. It was entered into the 9th Moscow International Film Festival where Fábri won a Special Prize for Directing.

== Cast ==
- András Bálint as Lőrinc Parcen Nagy
- Mari Csomós as Éva
- Zoltán Latinovits as Professor Wavra
- Anikó Sáfár as Désirée, Lőrinc's sister
- Mária Bisztrai as Laura (as Bisztray Mária)
- Margit Makay as Grandmother
- László Mensáros as Károly Parcen Nagy
- Margit Dajka as Ms. Hupka (as Dayka Margit)
- Noémi Apor as Mrs. Timmermann
- Lujza Orosz as Mrs. Rózsa
- György Cserhalmi as Béla
- Sándor Lukács as Miklós Vidovics
- András Kern as Kesztyűs
