= Imre Soós =

Hungarian actor

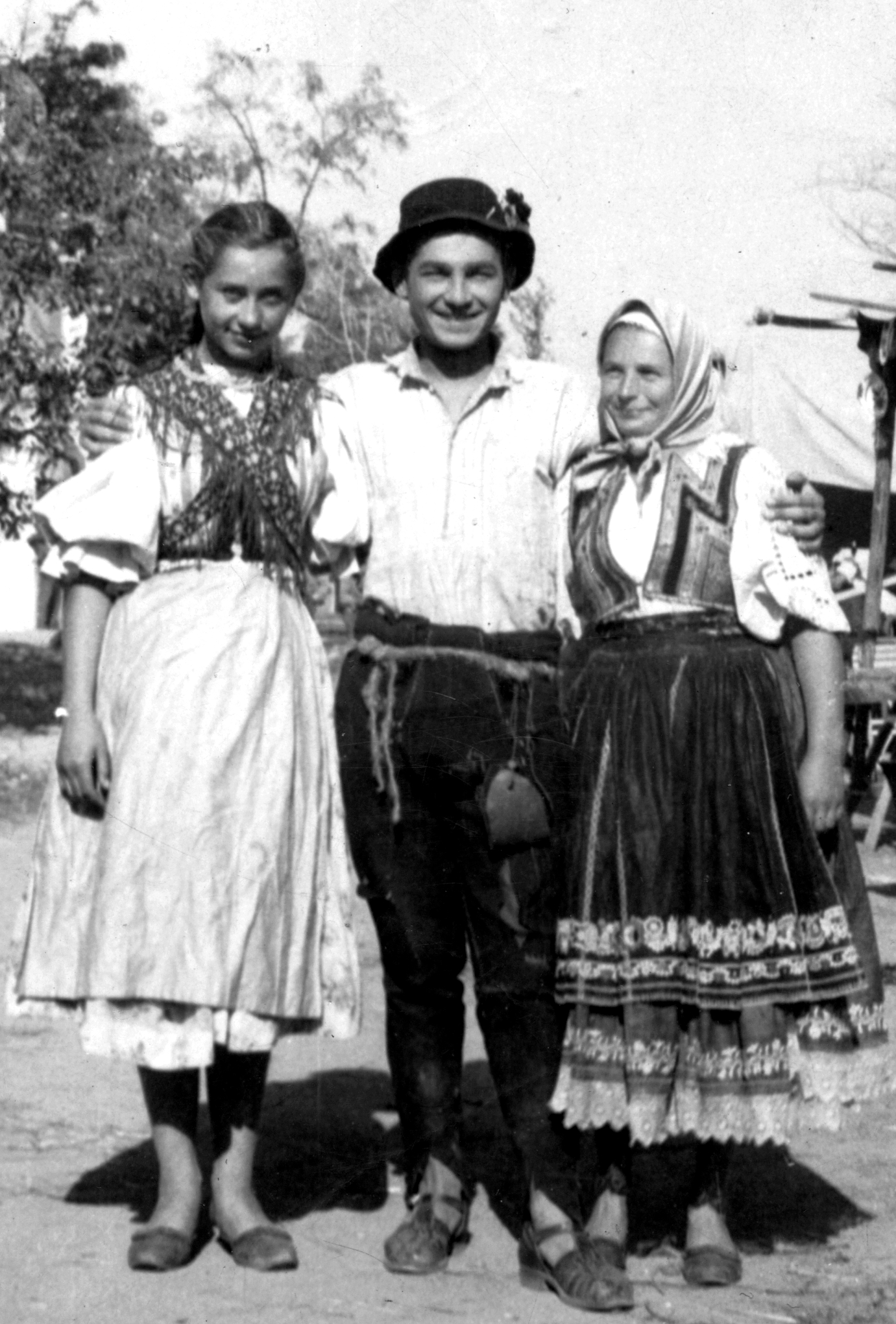
- with locals in the shooting of the film Matyi Lúdas 1949
- Born: 12 February 1930; Balmazújváros, Hungary
- Died: 20 June 1957 (aged 27); Budapest, Hungary
- Occupation: Actor
- Years active: 1948–1956

Imre Soós (12 February 1930 – 20 June 1957) was a Hungarian actor, mostly known for his roles in communist propaganda films during the 1950s. He played the leading role in the 1956 film Körhinta.

== Career ==
=== Early years ===
Imre Soós was born on 12 February 1930, in Balmazújváros, as the eighth child of a peasant family living in great poverty. Like every member of his family, some of which were illiterate, his time was mostly consumed working in the fields, until he tried his luck by presenting himself to a travelling casting team in 1948. Fuelled by their praise, and the growing want to travel, he went to Budapest to enter the Academy of Drama, where he was admitted after the first hearing. The young boy, only turning 18, was overwhelmed with the buzzing life of the capital, as he rarely even travelled to the county seat before. Soós entered a class filled with talent, including Irén Psota, Józsa Hacser, and Teri Horváth. As later documents showed, his teachers praised him with high words, partially influenced by his forced political involvement, which left a strong mark on his later career.

=== Entry in the film industry ===
He began filming in 1948, to complement his livelihood. Getting a minor role in Talpalatnyi föld, he filled his role of a chanting peasant boy with past memories, gaining instant, albeit unintentional attention. The true success comes with his leading role in 1949's Lúdas Matyi, the first Hungarian color film, in which his life-filled folk-tale character gained success all over the country, and abroad - he became the best male actor on the Karlovy Vary International Film Festival of 1950, the highest ranking prize in socialist countries of the era. As the political climate pressed filmmakers for more realistic presentation of young peasants, workers, Soós seemed ideal to fill this role, especially as he was "raised from poverty", and achieved a lot compared to his comrades. This ideological background haunted his later life.

=== After graduation ===
As his fame grew potentially, Soós's self-estimation shrank with it. Aware of his shortcomings, he became more and more closed to others, and humble, studying extensively to make up for his missing high school graduation. He works in films all along the academy years, finishing in 1952. After graduation, he gets an offer to work in the Madách Theatre, but is denied by the authorities, and is sent to the Csokonai Imre Theatre of Debrecen with the intention to serve as an example in his home. He spends 3 years commuting between filming in the capital and Debrecen, where surrounded by fear and bad reputation of being a poster boy of the communists. In 1955 he was finally allowed to work in Madách Theatre, however, he was not allowed to play certain roles. By 1955 he finishes Körhinta, a film that becomes one of the most acclaimed piece of Hungarian cinema.

=== Downfall ===
The media of the time, highly motivated by politics, dealt with him in varying pace. If the instructed subject was fitting to Soós, he was over-popularized, when the government's focus was elsewhere, he was completely omitted. This constant change of values weighted heavily on the actor, questioning his own worth, despite national and international success, the latter ignored by newspapers. Trying to bury himself with work, and to meet more and more expectations, he slowly sank into depression, along with drug usage and alcohol problems. His state become worse when his love, Violetta Ferrari left the country in 1956, and he was denied to travel to the Moscow World Festival of Youth of 1957, the era's only legal meeting place for youth of East and West. Under hospital treatment after a suicide attempt, he falls in love with his doctor, Hedvig Perjési, leading to a passionate and rough relationship. A few weeks after their marriage, the couple was found dead on 20 June 1957. Authorities interpreted the tragedy as double suicide, but a number of clues like Soós scratching the wall until his fingernails bled were hinting to a number of possible scenarios, including an accidental event, or murder. The short investigation drew no further conclusions, leaving ground for several myths and conspiration theories.

== Legacy ==
Passing away at age 27, Imre Soós's career was one of the shortest to achieve such critically acclaim. While the public knows him mainly from politically motivated movies, his theatrical work received equal praise by professionals. In 2001 the MASZK National Actor's Guild founded the Soós Imre prize for young talents. His life was dramatized by Miklós Hubay in his 1974 drama Tüzet Viszek and 1973 film Imre Soós (directed by Pál Sándor), while his relationship with Hedvig Perjési was novelized by Péter Müller in the book Részeg Józanok.

== Filmography ==
- 1948 – Talpalatnyi föld
- 1949 – Lúdas Matyi
- 1950 – Singing Makes Life Beautiful
- 1951 – Try and Win
- 1952 – Állami áruház
- 1953 – Ifjú szívvel
- 1953 – Kis krajcár
- 1953 – A harag napja
- 1953 – Föltámadott a tenger
- 1954 – Liliomfi
- 1954 – Hintónjáró szerelem
- 1955 – 9-es kórterem
- 1955 – Körhinta
- 1956 – Eltüsszentett birodalom

== Sources ==
- Miklós, Hubay. Soós Imre - A megváltó mutatvány. Budapest: Magvető, 1965. OCLC 250442296
- - Imre Soós in the Hungarian Theatrical Lexicon (György, Székely. Magyar Színházművészeti Lexikon. Budapest: Akadémiai Kiadó, 1994. ISBN 978-963-05-6635-3), freely available on mek.oszk.hu
