= Tibor Kristóf =

Hungarian actor

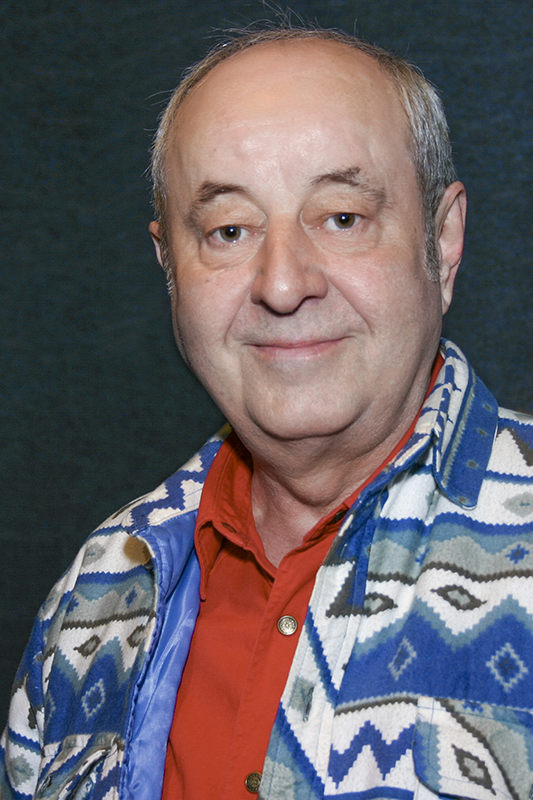
- Kristóf in 2005
- Born: 20 February 1942; Miskolc, Hungary
- Died: 2 September 2009 (aged 67); Budapest, Hungary
- Occupation: Actor
- Years active: 1967–2009

Tibor Kristóf (20 February 1942 – 2 September 2009) was a Hungarian actor.

== Biography ==
Besides his career in Hungarian films and television, Kristóf provided the Hungarian-language voices of many prominent English-speaking Hollywood actors in major American-produced films.

Kristóf provided the Hungarian language voice of Morgan Freeman in the films, The Bucket List and Wanted. He also provided the Hungarian voice over for actors Sean Connery and Peter Gilmore.

Kristóf also provided the voice of Darth Vader in George Lucas' Star Wars films, including Star Wars Episode IV: A New Hope.

== Death ==
Kristóf died on 2 September 2009 in Budapest at the age 67.

== Filmography ==
Year	Title	Role	Notes
1973	Nápolyt látni és...		
1975	Kenyér és cigaretta		
1976	Talpuk alatt fütyül a szél	Gyönyörû József	
1976	Kilenc hónap	Hajnóczy István, docens	Voice
1978	A közös bün		
1981	Autóversenyzök		
1982	Cha-Cha-Cha	Gruber papa	
1982	Dögkeselyü	Nyomozó	
1983	Viadukt	Tetzlav	Voice
1984	Hivatalnok urak	Müller	
1984	Hófehér	Futár	Voice
1985	Flowers of Reverie	Heinrich magyar hangja	Voice
1991	The Seventh Brother	Héja (Hawk)	Voice
1993	Sose halunk meg		
2001	Hamvadó cigarettavég		
2002	Szép halál volt		Voice (final film role)
