= The Tragedy of Man (film) =

- Theatrical release poster
- Hungarian: Az ember tragédiája
- Directed by: Marcell Jankovics
- Written by: Marcell Jankovics
- Based on: The Tragedy of Man by Imre Madách
- Produced by: Károlyné Koncz; Borbála Mezei
- Starring: Tibor Szilágyi; Mátyás Usztics; Ágnes Bertalan; Tamás Széles; Piroska Molnár
- Cinematography: Zoltán Bacsó
- Edited by: Gyöngyi Féjja; Márta Fényi; Magda Hap; Iván Talpas; Zsuzsa Tóth
- Music by: László Sáry
- Production company: Magyar Rajzfilm
- Distributed by: Mozinet
- Release dates: 27 November 2011 (Anilogue); 8 December 2011
- Running time: 160 minutes
- Country: Hungary
- Language: Hungarian
- Budget: 600 million Ft ($2.5 million USD)

The Tragedy of Man (Hungarian: Az ember tragédiája) is a 2011 Hungarian adult animated epic drama film directed by Marcell Jankovics, starring Tibor Szilágyi, Mátyás Usztics, Ágnes Bertalan, Tamás Széles and Piroska Molnár. The narrative is set in several different eras, spanning from Biblical creation to 50,000 BC to the distant future, and follows Adam, Eve, and Lucifer as they explore humanity and the meaning of life. Each segment has a different visual style to reflect the art of the respective time periods. The film is based on the 1861 play The Tragedy of Man by Imre Madách.

The film went into production in 1988, but encountered difficulties as the production model for Hungarian cinema changed. The segments were financed individually and sometimes exhibited independently at film festivals and on Hungarian television. After 23 years in production, the finished film premiered in 2011. It is one of the longest animated films ever made.

== Plot ==
God creates the universe. Lucifer mocks God for the shortcomings of humanity, which he predicts will soon aspire to become God. As the primaeval spirit of negation, he claims to be as old as God and demands his share of the world, which he is granted in the Tree of Knowledge and the Tree of Immortality.

Lucifer tempts Adam and Eve to eat the forbidden fruit. Expelled from the Garden of Eden and abandoned by God, Adam reasons that he is no longer obliged to show God any gratitude. He decides to live from his own strength alone. Lucifer offers Adam to experience his own future, and takes him from the Stone Age into the future, throughout human history.

In ancient Egypt, Adam is Pharaoh Djoser in 2650 BC who falls in love with Eve in the form of a slave woman. Adam abolishes slavery, but Lucifer, as Anubis, argues that it would be futile, as history would prove. Adam is taken to ancient Greece, where democracy has resulted in corruption and foul political play. Adam appears as Miltiades in 489 BC and is sentenced to death after the masses have been agitated against him. Disillusioned, Adam is taken to ancient Rome in 67 AD where he and Lucifer enjoy themselves with gladiator games and prostitutes. As civilization grows decadent and falls apart, Adam and Eve encounter Saint Peter and then Jesus, and turn to God, who gives them a message of love and fraternity. Adam becomes Tancred, Prince of Galilee in 1096 AD but is disgusted by all the petty savagery within a Church prone to schisms. He falls in love with Eve who is locked inside a monastery.

Adam is then Johannes Kepler in Prague, 1615. He seeks eternal wisdom by studying the physical world while his wife is unfaithful. Adam becomes Georges Danton during the French Revolution in Paris, 1794. Eve appears as an aristocrat who is guillotined and as a prostitute who revels in the revolutionary terror. Danton is eventually put before the National Convention and executed for conspiring with the aristocracy. Once again in the body of Kepler, Adam wakes up from a dream. He recognizes that ideas are more powerful and long-lasting than individual men. Adam and Lucifer visit Victorian London in 1897 as unnamed Englishmen, which Adam initially finds impressive but Lucifer argues is decayed on a spiritual level, as everything has become a commodity. Adam tries to court Eve and is eventually able to seduce her, right after World War I, with the help of jewels and a Gypsy fortune-teller. When social unrest erupts in the 20th century, Adam wishes for a society ruled after scientific principles for the common good.

Lucifer brings Adam to a future egalitarianist world state in the center of the 21st century. Although initially positive, Adam immediately regrets the disappearance of nations, as he thinks people should have a past and an identity to hold on to. Animals and plants which are not useful are extinct and the useful ones have been genetically modified. Adam questions the materialist worldview and is arrested for criminal thinking. Eve appears as a mother who is punished for refusing to let society educate her child. Adam and Lucifer travel further to a dehumanized future in space. Adam is at first unsettled, but when the spirit of Earth urges him to return, he proclaims that his spirit can live beyond the body. On the verge of annihilation, Adam changes his mind and promises to keep striving on Earth. He accepts mortality and man's struggle.

In a distant ice age, the last remains of humanity are dying. The few people Adam encounters are deformed savages. Lucifer argues that they do not differ in nature from humans of any other era.

Adam wakes up in his cave 50,000 BC. He joins Lucifer on a cliff, where he argues for the existence of free will, while Lucifer reminds him of the futility of human ambition. Adam argues that he can still go against God by committing suicide. As he is about to leap from the cliff, Eve finds him and tells him that she is pregnant. God urges Adam to keep having faith. Adam decides to follow God's word and accepts struggle as an end in itself.

== Cast ==
- Tibor Szilágyi as the Lord
- Mátyás Usztics as Lucifer
- Ágnes Bertalan as Eve
- Tamás Széles as Adam
- Piroska Molnár as the spirit of Earth

== Soundtrack ==
The soundtrack of the film is comprised by multiple fragments extracted mostly from pieces of classical music, some of them used as leitmotifs throughout the film. Here is a list of pieces used (according to the credits).

- Alexander Scriabin
  - Prometheus: The Poem of Fire, Op. 60 (1908–10)
  - Prefatory Action to the Final Mystery (1903–15, left unfinished and realised by Alexander Nemtin)
- Wolfgang Amadeus Mozart
  - Requiem in D minor, K626 (1791–92, left unfinished and completed by Franz Xaver Süssmayr)
- Claude Debussy
  - Pelléas et Mélisande (1893-1902)
  - La Mer, L.109 (1903–05)
  - Images, L.122 (1905–12)
- Maurice Ravel
  - Daphnis et Chloé, ballet-choreographic symphony (1909–12)
- Franz Liszt
  - Faust Symphony (1854–55, rev 1857-61)
  - Orchestral arrangement of Csárdás macabre (1881–82)
  - Orchestral arrangement of "Teleki László" from "Historical Hungarian Portraits" (1885)
- Pyotr Ilyich Tchaikovsky
  - Romeo and Juliet Fantasy-Overture (1869, rev 1870 and 1880)
  - 1812 Overture (1880)
- Modest Mussorgsky
  - Pictures at an Exhibition (1874, orchestrated by Ravel in 1922)
  - Night on Bald Mountain (1867, revised by Nikolai Rimsky-Korsakov in 1886)
- Ottorino Respighi
  - Pines of Rome, P141 (1924)
- László Sáry
  - Immaginario (1970)
  - Telihold (1986)
  - Töredékek
- Nikolai Rimsky-Korsakov
  - Scheherazade (1888)
- Richard Wagner
  - The Valkyrie (1854–56)
- Clément Janequin
  - Danse
- Thomas Tallis
  - Spem in Alium (c. 1556-70)
- Jan Dismas Zelenka
  - Lamentatio
- Hector Berlioz
  - Symphonie Fantastique (1830)
- Johann Sebastian Bach
  - Saint Matthew Passion, BWV 244 (1727)
- Erik Satie
  - Jack in the Box (1899)
  - Parade (1916–17)
  - Mercure (1924)
  - Relâche (1924)
- Paul Dukas
  - The Sorcerer's Apprentice (1897)
- Edward Elgar
  - Pomp and Circumstance March No. 1 (1901)
- Anton Bruckner
  - Symphony No.7 in E major (1881–83)
  - Symphony No. 9 in D minor (1887–96)

Folkloric and ancient music is also used:

- African tribal songs
- Ancient Greek music
- Irish folk music
- Pierre De Geyter - The Internationale

== Production ==
Marcell Jankovics wrote the screenplay for the film in 1983. It is based on Imre Madách's 1861 play The Tragedy of Man. The film went into production in 1988 at Pannonia Film Studio. Jankovics expected a typical animated feature to take three years to produce, but since The Tragedy of Man would have twice the running time of a typical film he expected it to take six years to make. After the fall of communism in Hungary in 1989, Jankovics could no longer rely on the state-funded system he had produced his previous films within and had to seek alternative ways to finance the project.

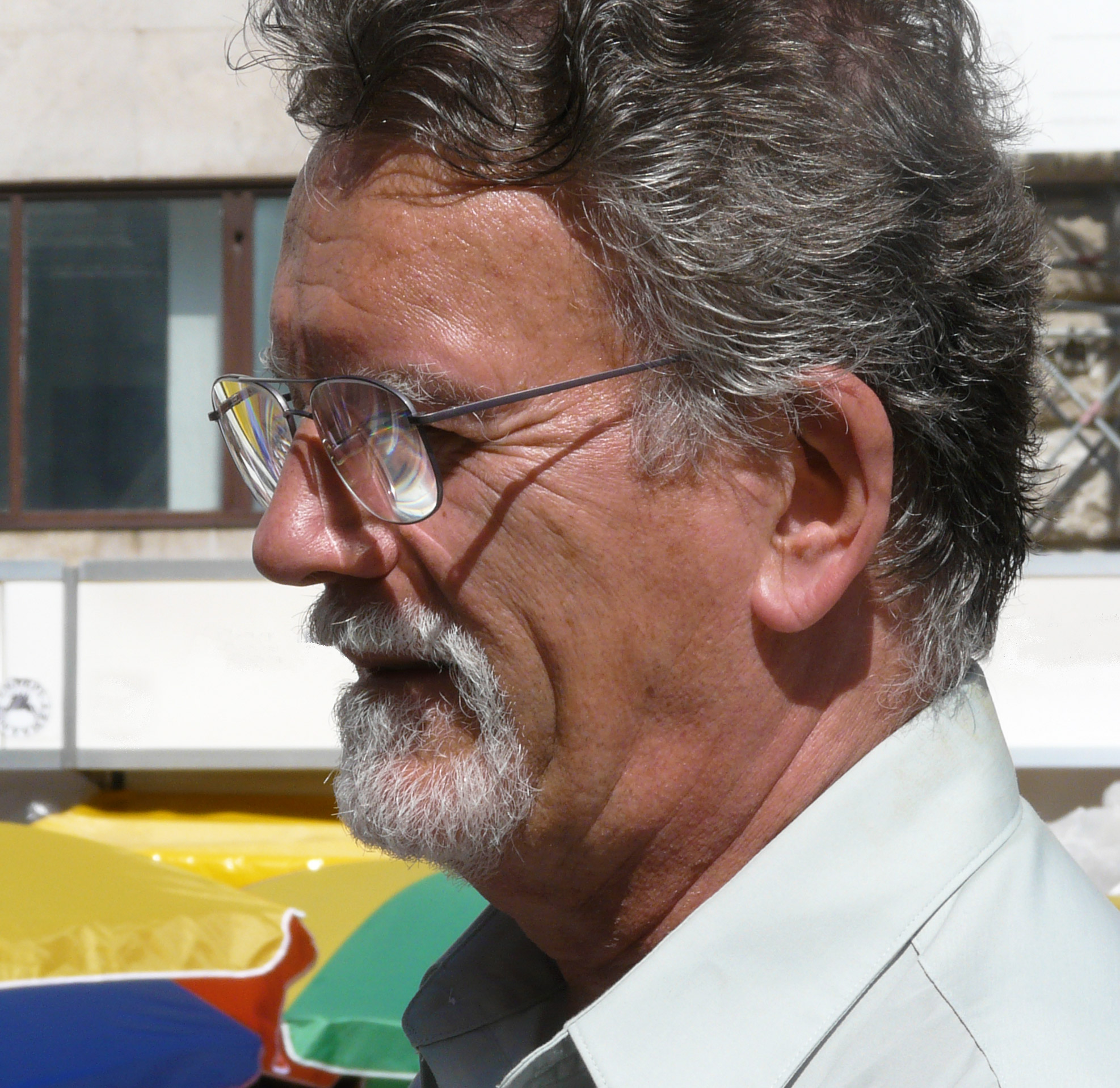
Jankovics in 2010

The film was produced one segment at a time, after which production ceased until funding had been secured for the next segment. Just like in the original play, there is a total of 15 segments. Each of these were animated in a different visual style. Over the years, several segments were exhibited individually at film festivals and shown on the public television network Duna, although the majority of the material was never shown publicly until the entire film was finished.

In 2008 some funding was secured when Jankovics' 1974 short film Sisyphus was used in an American car commercial which was shown at the Super Bowl. In 2011 the film received 19.5 million forint from the culture department of the Ministry of National Resources. The total cost of the film corresponded to 600 million forint (approximately two and half million U.S. Dollars) in the exchange rate at the time of the release. After 23 years in production, the last post-production work was finished in 2011.

== Release ==
The film premiered on 27 November 2011 at the Anilogue International Animation Film Festival. It was released in regular Hungarian cinemas by Mozinet on 8 December 2011. The film was shown with an intermission, which made a screening last for three hours from start to finish. The film had 20,000 admissions in Hungary, of which 9,500 came from Budapest where it was screened in a single cinema. It was shown at a number of international film festivals. In June 2013, it was shown at the Facets Cinémathèque in Chicago.

For home video, Deaf Crocodile released the film on Blu-ray in 2025 as both a standard release and a limited deluxe edition with a collector's booklet containing essays by film critic Walter Chaw and author Mitch Horowitz.

== Reception ==
Bill Stamets of the Chicago Sun-Times wrote:

The animation styles vary throughout this chronology of human folly, but this wary sermon stays on message[.] ... Lucifer the interlocutor delights in the endless conflict between human reason and a hands-off God.

Stamets continued:

To add strains of grandeur, [Jankovics] draws on works by Bach, Mussorgsky, Respighi and Wagner. He thrills when visualizing the French Revolution as a tri-color mob in motion. Later, twisting DNA strands are depicted nearly as mystically. All told, The Tragedy of Man is illustrated theology.

== See also ==
- The Annunciation, a 1984 film based on the same play
