= Lajos Őze =

Hungarian actor

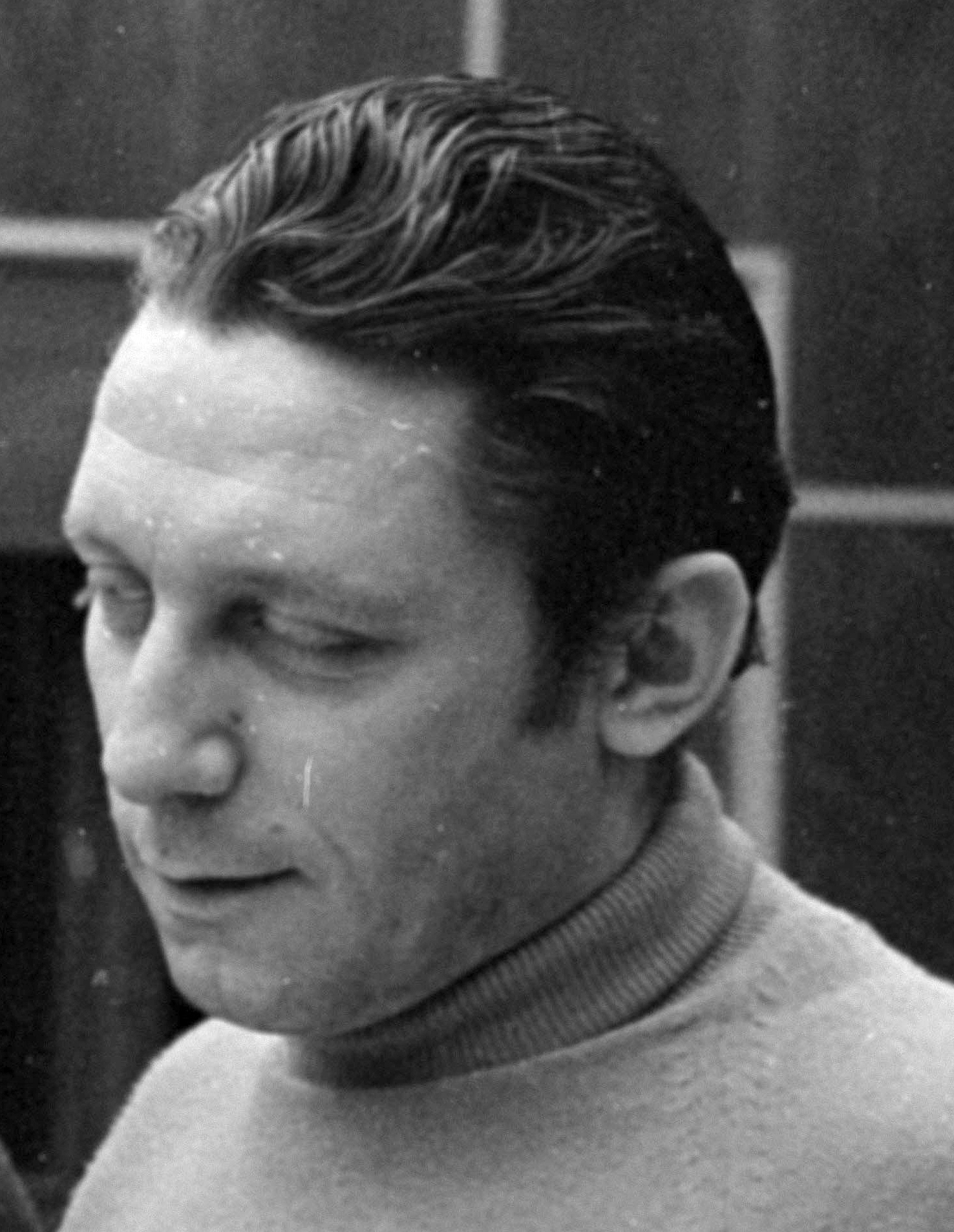
- Born: 27 April 1935; Szentes, Hungary
- Died: 21 October 1984 (aged 49); Budapest, Hungary
- Occupation: Actor
- Years active: 1955–1984
- Spouse: Thoma Ildikó
- Children: 1
- Awards: Kossuth Prize (1990)

Lajos Őze (27 April 1935 – 21 October 1984) was a Hungarian actor. He appeared in over 80 films between 1955 and 1984. He starred in the 1976 film The Fifth Seal, which was entered into the 27th Berlin International Film Festival.

== Life ==
He was born in Szentes as the son of a butcher and a cook. As a child, he suffered from a stutter, and as a result he was excluded and mocked by his classmates at school. He developed a passion for cinema at an early age, but because of financial difficulties he could rarely afford to go.

Between 1949 and 1952, he attended the agricultural technical school in his hometown, and in 1956 he graduated from the Academy of Drama and Film in Budapest.

== Work and success ==
He began his acting career at the National Theatre of Miskolc. After three years, in 1959, he joined the National Theatre of Budapest, where he remained a member until his death. He gave consistently outstanding performances in both leading roles and character parts. He was also an excellent performer of poetry recitations. At the same time, he was never satisfied with his own work.

He made his first film appearances in the second half of the 1950s, but he did not become a sought-after film actor until about a decade later. During the final two decades of his life, he appeared in numerous films, including his memorable roles as Comrade Virág in *The Witness* and Miklós Gyurica in *The Fifth Seal*.

Despite his success, he remained a reserved and withdrawn person. He avoided public places and was even uncomfortable using public transport. The admiration he received from audiences could never fully erase the humiliations he had experienced as a child. He only had one friend from the acting world, Zoltán Latinovits.

Already suffering from a terminal illness, he accepted the leading role in Péter Bacsó’s film *What Time Is It, Mr. Vekker?*, but he died during the filming.

== Legacy ==
In recognition of his work as an actor, he received the Jászai Mari Award in 1970] was named an Artist of Merit in 1975, and became a Distinguished Artist in 1984. In 1990, he was posthumously awarded the Kossuth Prize.

He had two children; his sons are cinematographer Gábor Őze and actor Áron Őze. The cinema in Szentes is named after him.

== Selected filmography ==
- A Glass of Beer (1955)
- Two Confessions (1957)
- The Round-Up (1965)
- Twenty Hours (1965)
- The Witness (1969)
- The Upthrown Stone (1969)
- The Fifth Seal (1976)
- Macbeth (1982)
- Flowers of Reverie (1985)
