= Parviz Kimiavi =

Iranian-Persion film director

- پرويز کيمياوی
- Born: November 30, 1938 (age 87); Tehran, Iran
- Occupations: Film director Screenwriter
- Years active: 1969 - present

Parviz Kimiavi (Persian: پرويز کيمياوی; born November 30, 1938 in Tehran) is an Iranian (Persian) film director, screenwriter, editor and one of the most prominent figures of Persian cinema of the 20th century.

Kimiavi studied photography and film at l'École Louis Lumière (Louis Lumiere School of Cinematography) and IDHEC. His works gained critical success and won several prizes in important international events such as Berlin and Cannes.

== Filmography: Directing ==
- The Old Man and His Stone Garden (Piremard va bagh-e sangi'ash, 2004)
- Iran Is My Homeland (Iran sara-ye man ast, 1999)
- Simone Weil (1988) (TV)
- Zourkhaneh: The House of Strength (Zourkhaneh: La maison de force, 1988) (TV)
- Blue Jeans (Blue jean, Le, 1984) (TV)
- Oswaldo Rodriguez (1983) (TV)
- Portrait of a Tunisian Boy (Portrait d'un jeune Tunisien, 1982) (TV)
- The Trench (Tranche, La, 1981) (TV)
- OK Mister! (1979)
- The Garden of Stones (Bagh-e Sangi, 1976)
- The Mongols (Mogholha, 1973)
- P Like Pelican (P mesle pelican, 1972)
- Gowharshad Mosque (Masjed-e gowharshad, 1971)
- Mashhad's Bazaar (Bazar-e mashhad, 1970)
- From Bojnurd to Quchan (Bojnurd ta quchan, 1970)
- Shiraz 70 (Shiraz-e 70, 1970)
- Oh Guardian of Deers (Ya zamen-e ahu, 1970)
- The Hills of Qaytariyeh (Tappehaye qaytariyeh, 1969)

== Awards and honours ==
- Silver Bear: 26th Berlin International Film Festival (1976 - The Garden of Stones (Bagh-e Sangi))
