= Little Valentino =

1979 drama film

- Directed by: András Jeles
- Screenplay by: András Jeles; Zsuzsa Tóth
- Cinematography: Sándor Kardos
- Edited by: Galamb Margit
- Music by: Kamilló Lendvay
- Release date: 1979
- Language: Hungarian

Little Valentino (Hungarian: A kis Valentinó), also known as The Little Valentino, is a 1979 Hungarian drama film written and directed by András Jeles, in his directorial debut.

== Cast ==
- János Opoczki as László
- István Iványi as Józsikám
- József Farkas as Idõ's taxi driver
- Dénes Ladányi as Dénes
- Belane Szekacs as Amál
- Ferencné Lévai as Irén
- Sándorné Árpa as László's mother
- Iván Molnár as Sr. Frész
- Oszkár Ipacs as Quiosquer

== Release ==
The film was screened at the 36th Venice International Film Festival, in the Officina Veneziana sidebar.

== Reception ==
A contemporary Variety review described the film as 'nicely acted, well handled but essentially playoff actioner', a film that 'at first [is] full of sharp observation', but 'finally drifts into aimlessness'.

In a retrospective review for Chicago Reader, Pat Graham described the film as 'an aggressively experimental film, elliptical in the manner of the old New Wave', paired it to Jim Jarmusch's Stranger Than Paradise, and remarked that 'it’s hard not to be impressed by its on-the-edge assurance'.

The BFI Companion to Eastern European and Russian Cinema noted that the film 'provoked both scandal and an enthusiastic reception', particularly for its use of docu-fiction style, pushed in 'an absurd-surrealist direction, constructing by the film's end a gloomy atmosphere of reality'.
