= István Márta =

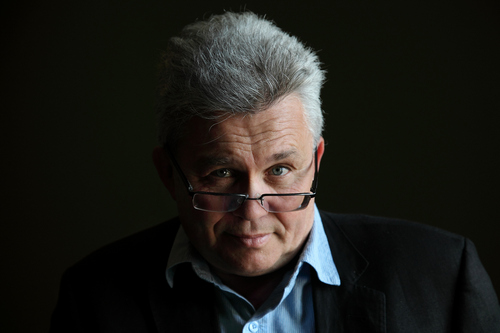
- Born: June 14, 1952; Budapest, People's Republic of Hungary
- Occupations: composer, manager

István Márta (born 14 June 1952) is a Hungarian composer, theater and festival director, manager of the Zsolnay Cultural Quarter.

== Family ==
He has two children and two grandchildren. His wife is a ceramist.

== Achievements ==
- 1972-84 Organisation of various concerts and lectures (Music Section of Fiatal Művészek Klubja – Young Artists’ Club, Fiatal Zeneszerzők Csoportja - Young Composers’ Group)
- 1973 - Field trip to Moldva (Romania) for collecting folk music
- 1980 Member of the Group 180 (both as a composer and an instrumental performer), member of Mandel Quartet, which plays historical music. As a member of the Mendel Quartet toured the United States, Mexico, Brazil, Israel, and various European countries several times.
- 1980 - Several concerts with own works performed (Korunk Zenéje, MTV Vigadó Est, Varsói Ősz – Contemporary Music, Hungarian TV Readout Concert, Warsaw Autumn)
- 1981-83 Teacher of Classical Music History and 20th Century Music Analysis on the Jazz Faculty of Bartók Béla Music Conservatory
- 1985 - Organised various musical-theatrical actions, happenings (the contemporary music festivals Plánum and Randevú - Planum and Rendezvous) as well as Mozart Concerts in the Várszínház (Castle Theatre)
- 1989 - Editor in Chief of “Völgyfutár” (daily paper of the Valley of Arts)
- 1989 - Director and Artistic Director of the multicultural festival “Kapolcs days – Valley of Art
- 1988-90 Music Director of the Petőfi Sándor Theatre in Veszprém
- 1990-92 Music Director of the Nemzeti Színház (National Theatre)
- 1994-96 Music Director of the New Theatre
- 1998 - 2012 Director of the New Theatre in Budapest
- 2003 - Chairman of the Magyar Fesztivál Szövetség(Hungarian Festival Association)
- 2011 - Managing director of Zsolny Heritage Management Nonprofit LTD. In Pécs

== Music ==
- 1979 Szöveg és zene – zenés színházi előadás Beckett rádiójátéka nyomán (Theatre evening in the spirit of Beckett)
- 1980 Karácsony Napja – 24. lecke – kamaraegyüttesre (Christmas Day-The 24th lesson)
- 1983 Szíveink – requiem töredék (Our Hearts- pieces of requiem)
- 1985 Munkásoperett –musical (Workers’ operetta-musical)
- 1985 Babaházi történet – zeneütőhangszerekre (Doll’s House Story)
- 1986 …per quattro tromboni… - négy harsonára
- 1989 Sóhaj (Doom.A Sigh) – vonósnégyes a KronosQuartet (USA) megrendelésére

(piece for Kronos Quartetz)

- 1990-98 Az Üvegfúvó álma (The Glassblower’s Dream) vonósnégyes
- 1983-97 Wyx-ciklus hangszalagra (WYX-pieces)
- 1995 Scrabbles-music - kamarazenekarra
- 1997 Liliomfi – zenés játék (theatre evening)
- 2010 Sweet Cell Phone World (Operatorio for voices and network coverage)

=== Songs ===
- 1985 Vakok – kamaraegyüttesre és tenorra (Blinds)
- 1996 Négy dal Petőcz és Szőcs versekre (Four songs inspired by poems)

=== Music for tape ===
- 1982 A múzeum hangjai (Voices of a museum)
- 1984 Látomások-balett (Magyar Állami Operaház) (Dreams for Hungarian State Opera House)
- 1989 Slips and stream-balett (Hollandia, Netherlands)
- 1990 Blasting in the Birdcage (Németország, Germany)
- 1990 Egy sikoly anatómiája (Anatomy of a Scream)-balett (Hollandia, Netherlands)
- 1992 Szent Antal megkísértése (Temptation of Saint Anthony)- (Szegei Szabadtéri Játékok, Open Air Theatre Festival of Szeged, Hungary))
- 1995 Don’t look back-balett (Hollandia, Netherlands))
- 1999 Musica Diavolae (International Association of Radios)
- 2001 Támad a szél II. - The Wind Strikes II. (National Balet – Pécs)
- 2001 Az ember tragédiája - Tragedy of Man (National Theatre)
- 2001 A Falunk rossza – The Villain of our Village (New Theatre)
- 2005 Történetek az elveszett birodalomból (Stories from the Lost Empires)- film music
- 2005 El Camino- film music
- 2005 Fire Music (“Time-trip” suite in 7 parts)

== Theatre ==
As a student at the conservatory and the Academy of Music He participated in several amateur and professional theatrical performances (such as Borbo, the 25 th Theatre and Thália). He composed music for the public performances of graduating students at the College of Dramatic Arts several times. Since 1976 He have written over 300 theatrical and film scores, for the works of Tamás Ascher, János Szikora, János Ács, Imre Csiszár, Miklós Jancsó, András Jeles, Ferenc András, János Taub and many others.

=== Directions ===
- 1991 Várszínház (Castle Theatre), Budapest – Opera of Kapolcs
- 1993 Arany János Theatre, Budapest – Lorca/Block, two one-act plays
- 1996 National Theatre, Pécs – Cabaret, musical
- 1997 National Theatre, Pécs – Fiddler on the Roof, musical
- 2000 New Theatre, Budapest – The Demagogue
- 2001 New Theatre, Budapest – The Villain of our Village

== Other works ==
Television, radio directions:

- 1987 Kapolcs riadó – videoklip (MTV-BBS)
- 1989 Templom – videoklip (MTV)
- 1989-91 Képnaplók (MTV)
- 1998 A vándor – rádiójáték (Magyar Rádió)
- 1981-84 Az erdész levele, J. M. Wyx hagyatéka – két kiállítás

== Awards ==
- 1979 Nivo Award of the Hungarian Television
- 1982 Listeners’ Choice Award of the Hungarian Radio
- 1982 Tribune International des Compositeurs Awards in Paris
- 1987 Tribune International des Compositeurs Award in Paris
- 1987 Erkel Award
- 1994 Podmaniczky Award
- 1994 János Déri Award
- 1997 Decoration for Veszprém County
- 1998 Theatre Critics’ Award for the music of Peer Gynt
- 1998 Gold Medal of the President
- 1999 Freeman of Kapolcs
- 2000 Lovagkereszt Decoration of the Republic of Hungary
- 2001 Pro Regio Award
- 2002 Tisztikereszt Decoration of the Republic of Hungary (Civilian Section)
- 2012 Középkereszt Decoration of the Republic of Hungary

== Discography ==
- Alte und neue Musik

Thorofon STW 831024 (1985) – LP

- HEARTS (Szíveink) LP

Hungaroton SLPX 12563 (1985)

- Kapolcs riadó – Támad a szél

Hungaroton Krém SLPX 17963 (1987) – LP

- Magyarország messzire van

Hungaroton SLPX (1991) – LP

- AMADINDA (Babaházi történet)

Hungaroton SLOD 12800 (1987) – LP Hungaroton Disc HCD 12855 – CD

- Black Angels (Doom. A Sigh – Sóhaj) - Kronos Quartet

Elektra Nonesuch 9 79242-2 DDD (1990) – CD

- Looking East – Hungary (Blasting in the Birdcage)

Erdenklang AD LC 8155 (1990) –CD

- Tájkép – Jazz Bridge Series

Newsic RMKK 9304 (1993) – MC

- Works

Newsic- Hungaroton HCD 31580 (1994) CD

- Hetedik (Dalok József Attila verseire –Hobo)

Insight 9070012 (1998) – CD

- Sound in sound out

Hungaroton HCD 31829 (1998) – CD

- The Wind Rises (re-issue of Kapolcs riadó – Támad a szél with titles in English)

ReR SD1, LC2677 UK (1998) – CD

== Music sheets ==
- Doll’s House Story – Babaházi történet
- Editio Musica Z. 13320
- „…. per quattro tromboni”
- Editio Musica Z. 13299
- Lesson 24 Christmas Day – Karácsony napja 24. Lecke
- Editio Musica Z. 13025
- Doom. A Sigh – Sóhaj
