= Hungarians (film) =

1978 film by Zoltán Fábri

- Directed by: Zoltán Fábri
- Written by: József Balázs; Zoltán Fábri
- Starring: Gábor Koncz
- Cinematography: György Illés
- Production company: Mafilm
- Release date: 8 February 1978
- Running time: 107 minutes
- Country: Hungary
- Languages: Hungarian; German; Polish

Hungarians (Hungarian: Magyarok) is a 1978 Hungarian drama film directed by Zoltán Fábri. It was nominated for the Academy Award for Best Foreign Language Film at the 51st Academy Awards.

== Plot ==
Winter of 1942/1943. Within the Csarda, a group of farmworkers convene, discussing the most advantageous course of action—to seek employment in Germany, primarily to avoid conscription, where they believe they can earn more. Their presence on the estate is met with acceptance; the manager is Hungarian, whose family barely escaped to the USA. Situated in a remote area, the estate's owner is elderly and ailing, with his sole son serving as a soldier. Nearby, a prisoner of war camp houses French detainees, whom they are strictly forbidden to approach.

Spring arrives, and the farm work intensifies. Shielded from the war's realities by their isolation, their naiveté is shattered by the sudden disappearance of the estate's coachman, the execution of exhausted Soviet prisoners, and the forced habitation of Polish families on the estate.

In the summer, a Polish child falls gravely ill, prompting spontaneous aid from the Hungarians. András Fábian keenly observes, sensing underlying connections. With careful saving, he and his wife manage to send their son a bicycle, allowing them a glimpse of the sea.

As autumn descends, a bountiful harvest brings temporary cheer. Amidst the joy, the youngest Hungarian, Abris Kondor, succumbs to tuberculosis. The estate owner, hoping to retain their presence, offers them leasehold land, but their hearts yearn for home.

Winter heralds their joyous return, yet it is tempered by the arrival of conscription notices. All the women are left with is a solitary photograph.

== Cast ==
- Gábor Koncz as Fábián András
- Éva Pap as Fábiánné, Ilona
- József Bihari as Utolsó magyar az álomjelenetben
- Sándor Szabó as Német gazda
- Zoltán Gera as Brainer, intézõ
- Tibor Molnár as Gáspár Dániel
- István O. Szabó as Kondor Ábris
- Noémi Apor as Szabóné, Zsófi
- Bertalan Solti as Szabó János
- Anna Muszte as Kisné, Rozika
- András Ambrus as Kis Dani

== See also ==
- List of submissions to the 51st Academy Awards for Best Foreign Language Film
- List of Hungarian submissions for the Academy Award for Best Foreign Language Film
