= Mátyás Usztics =

Hungarian actor

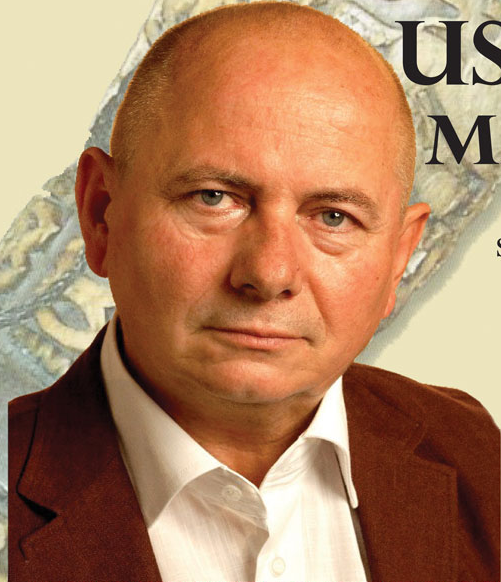
- Mátyás Usztics in 2008
- Born: 9 April 1949; Penészlek, Hungary
- Died: 29 April 2017 (aged 68); Budapest, Hungary
- Occupation: Actor
- Years active: 1969–2017

Mátyás Usztics (9 April 1949 – 29 April 2017) was a Hungarian stage and film actor, most notable for his role of Sgt. János Karádi in the Hungarian television show Angyalbőrben. As a regular voice actor too, he was the Hungarian dubbing voice of Roger Rabbit in Who Framed Roger Rabbit and Gopher in The Many Adventures of Winnie the Pooh. He served as founding director of the National Chamber Theatre from 2003 until his death.

Usztics was a founding member and "commander" of the Magyar Gárda, de facto paramilitary wing of the nationalist Jobbik party. He resigned from his position after three months.

== Selected filmography ==
- Csutak és a szürke ló (1961)
- Magyar rapszódia (1979)
- Allegro barbaro (1979)
- Angi Vera (1979)
- Rosszemberek (1979) - Vekóczi
- Kinek a törvénye? (1979) - Csatkai
- Vasárnapi szülök (1980) - Juli sógora
- Fábián Bálint találkozása Istennel (1980) - Balla Károly unokája
- Circus maximus (1980) - Öcsi
- A mérközés (1981)
- A zsarnok szíve, avagy Boccaccio Magyarországon (1981)
- Requiem (1982) - Szabadult fogoly
- Cha-Cha-Cha (1983) - Sztásni
- The Train Killer (1983) - Gömöri
- Délibábok országa (1983)
- Könnyü testi sértés (1983)
- Tight Quarters (1983) - Swede
- Az óriás (1984)
- Uramisten (1984)
- Házasság szabadnappal (1984) - Csaba
- Flowers of Reverie (1985) - Rendõrparancsnok
- Mata Hari (1985) - Stable N.C.O.
- Dráma a vadászaton (1986)
- Az erdö kapitánya (1988) - Sanislo (voice)
- Willy the Sparrow (1989) - Spagyi, a fõveréb (voice)
- Angyalbőrben (1990–1991, TV Series) - Karádi õrmester
- Stalin (1992, TV Movie) - Yezhov
- Kutyabaj (1992)
- Kisváros (1993–1999, TV Series) - Hunyadi János fõtörzs
- Macskafogó 2 - A sátán macskája (2007) - Mióka (voice)
- The Tragedy of Man (2011) - Lucifer (voice) (final film role)
