= Zoltán Fábri =

Hungarian film director

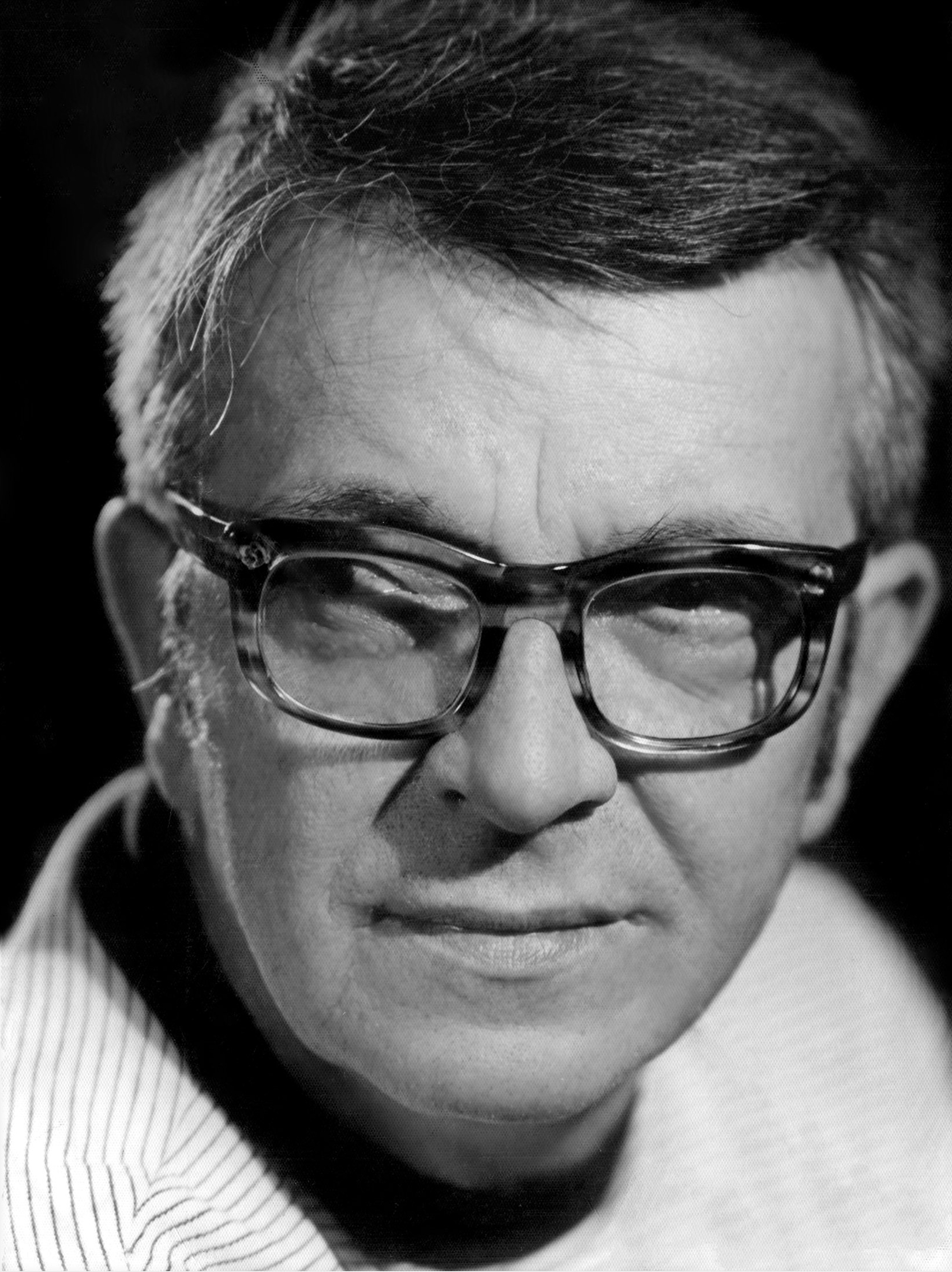
- Born: 15 October 1917; Budapest, Austria-Hungary
- Died: 23 August 1994 (aged 76); Budapest, Hungary
- Occupation: Film director
- Years active: 1951–1983

Zoltán Fábri (15 October 1917 – 23 August 1994) was a Hungarian film director and screenwriter. His films The Boys of Paul Street (1969) and Hungarians (1978) were nominated for the Academy Award for Best Foreign Language Film. His 1965 film Twenty Hours shared the Grand Prix with War and Peace at the 4th Moscow International Film Festival. His 1969 film The Toth Family was entered into the 7th Moscow International Film Festival. His 1975 film 141 Minutes from the Unfinished Sentence was entered into the 9th Moscow International Film Festival, where he won a Special Prize for Directing.

== Life and career ==
Fábri wanted to become an artist from an early age on. He studied painting and graduated at the Hungarian College of Fine Arts. He began working in the Hungarian film industry in 1950 as a production designer. He directed his first film Vihar (Storm) in 1951. He became an internationally acclaimed director with his third feature Körhinta (Merry Go-Round) in 1956. He continued directing and writing until the early 1980s. After his retirement from the film industry Fábri taught on the University of Theatre and Film Arts in Budapest. In his last years he wrote screenplays; they were never made. Fábri was also the president of the Hungarian Film Artist Union from 1959 to 1981.

Fábri's style of filmmaking can be described mainly as "classical", using academic techniques of art filmmaking. His greatest influences were the Italian Neorealism and French Poetic Realism. He experimented with narrative and flashback techniques for a while in the 1960s (in his films Nappali sötétség and Húsz óra) and his 1976 film Az ötödik pecsét contains some highly surrealist scenes, but overall he never used the mannerisms of modernist film in his works. For this reason the Kádár regime favored Fábri over more controversial and experimental directors like Miklós Jancsó. The film won the Golden Prize at the 10th Moscow International Film Festival and was entered into the 27th Berlin International Film Festival.

At the 11th Moscow International Film Festival in 1979, he was awarded with the Honorable Prize for the contribution to cinema.

He was known as a perfectionist who wrote, drawn and choreographed every scene to the most precise detail months before production began and never improvised anything. His reputation as a rigid, tyrannical director was somewhat contradicted by his friendly and kind behaviour towards the British and American child actors on the set of The Boys of Paul Street.

Fábri made nearly all of his films based on literary material (novels or short stories) and wrote the screenplays himself. His constant theme was the question of humanity. Many of his films are set in or around World War II. Two of his frequent collaborators were actress Mari Törőcsik and cinematographer György Illés. In 1969 he played the role of prosecuted statesman Zoltán Dániel in his friend Péter Bacsó's cult satire, A tanú (The Witness) as his sole acting job.

Fábri died in a heart attack at the age of 76 in 1994. His legal successor is Peter Fabri (b. 1985).

== Filmography ==
Title	Year	International Title	Director	Screenwriter	Production Designer	Actor
Maddie the Goose-boy	1950		Yes			
Déryné	1951				Yes	
Vihar	1952	Storm	Yes			
Erkel	1952				Yes	
Életjel	1954	Fourteen Lives	Yes			
Dandin György, avagy a megcsúfolt férj	1955				Yes	
Körhinta	1956	Merry Go-Round	Yes	Yes	Yes	
Hannibál tanár úr	1956	Professor Hannibal	Yes	Yes		
Bolond április	1957	Summer Clouds	Yes		Yes	
Édes Anna	1958	Sweet Anna	Yes	Yes	Yes	
Dúvad	1961	Brute	Yes	Yes		
Két félidő a pokolban	1962	The Last Goal	Yes	Yes	Yes	
Nappali sötétség	1963	Darkness in Daytime	Yes	Yes	Yes	
Vízivárosi nyár	1964	Hard Summer (TV series)	Yes			
Húsz óra	1965	Twenty Hours	Yes			
Utószezon	1966	Late Season	Yes			
A Pál-utcai fiúk	1969	The Boys of Paul Street	Yes	Yes		
Isten hozta, őrnagy úr!	1969	The Tóth Family	Yes	Yes		
A tanú	1969	The Witness				Yes
Hangyaboly	1971	Ant Hill	Yes	Yes		
Plusz-mínusz egy nap	1973	Plus-Minus One Day	Yes	Yes		
141 perc a befejezetlen mondatból	1975	141 Minutes from the Unfinished Sentence	Yes			
Az ötödik pecsét	1976	The Fifth Seal	Yes	Yes		
Magyarok	1978	Hungarians	Yes	Yes		
Fábián Bálint találkozása Istennel	1980	Bálint Fábián Meets God	Yes	Yes		
Requiem	1981		Yes	Yes		
Gyertek el a névnapomra	1983	Housewarming	Yes	Yes		
