= Keep Your Chin Up =

1954 film

- Directed by: Márton Keleti
- Written by: Péter Bacsó; Margit Gáspár; Károly Nóti; Péter Szász
- Produced by: József Golda
- Starring: Kálmán Latabár; Violetta Ferrari; Gyula Benkö
- Cinematography: György Illés
- Edited by: Mihály Morell
- Music by: Tibor Polgár
- Production company: Mafilm
- Release date: 7 October 1954
- Running time: 107 minutes
- Country: Hungary
- Language: Hungarian

Keep Your Chin Up (Hungarian: Fel a fejjel) is a 1954 Hungarian comedy film directed by Márton Keleti and starring Kálmán Latabár, Violetta Ferrari and Gyula Benkö. It was one of the most popular Hungarian films released during the period, attracting nearly six million spectators at the box office. It was shot at the Hunnia Studios in Budapest. The film's sets were designed by the art director József Pán.

== Main cast ==
- Kálmán Latabár as Peti bohóc
- Violetta Ferrari as Annuska
- Gyula Benkö as János
- Samu Balázs as Jackson
- Péter Benkö as Sanyika
- László Bánhidi as Baka
- Lajos Básti as Szakállas
- Gyula Gózon as Lustyák bácsi
- László Keleti as Márkus
- Ervin Kibédi as Nyilas
- Manyi Kiss as Lóidomár
- Sándor Pethes as Locsi
- Miklós Szakáts as Ödön
- Sándor Siménfalvy as Baka
- Imre Pongrácz as Müller
- Márta Fónay as Artista a társulatban
- Éva Spányik as Orosz doktornő a kórházban

== Bibliography ==
- Balski, Grzegorz . Directory of Eastern European Film-makers and Films 1945-1991. Flicks Books, 1992.
- Ostrowska, Dorota, Pitassio, Francesco & Varga, Zsuzsanna. Popular Cinemas in East Central Europe: Film Cultures and Histories. Bloomsbury Publishing, 2017
