= Nina Shivdasani =

Indian filmmaker (born 1946)

Nina Shivdasani Rovshen Sugati (born 15 May 1946, in Karachi, Undivided India), also known as NinaSugati SR and NinaSugati SR Shivdasani Rovshen is an Indian filmmaker and visual artist, best known for her arthouse film Chhatrabhang (1975).

== Life and career ==
She started out as a painter, but later turned to photography. She is a graduate of the School of Visual Arts in New York. She has exhibited her paintings and her photographs under the title Conceptual Art Imageographs. She is probably the first Indian experimental filmmaker.

Her arthouse film Chhatrabhang (The Divine Plan) won her the first FIPRESCI Award for an Indian film at the 26th Berlin International Film Festival in 1976 and a Maharashtra State Film Award in 1975. The seventy-five-minute color documentary about a caste dilemma in rural India was shot by cameraman Apurba Kishore Bir in two weeks among villagers and edited by Shivdasani over a year. This film is accompanied by music by Edgar Varèse and a commentary written by Vinay Shukla and spoken by Amrish Puri. It was shot on location in Jogiya village and enacted by local villagers. Chhatrabhang is a Marxist critque of the Indian caste (and class) system, strong and immovable as a rock. There is a recurrent shot of a labourer hammering and breaking apart a large rock as a symbol of changing social times. The "divine plan" of the title is that of the Brhamins who make the other castes serve them. This "partisan film" ends with a portrait of Baba Saheb and headlines about the killiings of thousands of Harijans (low caste citizens) for having dared to draw water from wells belonging to the Brahmins.

Her 2021 three-hour-long documentary SWA: Source Within Inner Wealth is an experiental exploration inspired by the Taittiriya Upanishad.

== Filmography ==
- Breaking Ground (1971)
- A World of all Intelligence (1972)
- Hope No One’s Listening (1972)
- Something about Transformation & Rediscovery aka The Banana Leaf (1972)
- Chhatrabhang (The Divine Plan) (1975)
- SWA: Source Within Inner Wealth (2021)
- Pragyanam (Consciousness) aka Nadh (Resonance) (2023)

== See also ==
- Shai Heredia (June 2005): "NINA SHIVDASANI ROVSHEN IN CONVERSATION"
- Ankan Kazi (21 May 2024): "Creating the Imageograph: Nina Sugati SR and the Counter-Cultural Image"
- Ankan Kazi (22 May 2024): "On Broken Ground: Early Short Films by Nina Sugati SR"
- An Exploded View: Panel discussion | 15 May 2021 @ YouTube
- Nancy Adajania (15 December 2020): "There must be a ground down there"
