= József Pán =

Hungarian art director

- Born: 31 May 1901; Budapest, Austria-Hungary
- Died: 18 March 1956 (aged 54); Budapest, Hungary
- Occupation: Art Director
- Years active: 1918–1956 (film)

József Pán (1901–1956) was a Hungarian art director. While he also briefly worked in Austria and Germany, most of his career was spent working in the Hungarian film industry designing film sets. He was active during the Horthy era and in post-Second World War Communist Hungary.

== Selected filmography ==
- Gulliver's Travels (1924)
- What Price Love? (1929)
- The Empress and the Hussar (1935)
- Hello, Budapest! (1935)
- Cafe Moscow (1936)
- Danube Rendezvous (1936)
- The Man Under the Bridge (1936)
- Three Dragons (1936)
- Tomi (1936)
- Sensation (1936)
- An Affair of Honour (1937)
- Lady Seeks a Room (1937)
- Barbara in America (1938)
- Black Diamonds (1938)
- The Witch of Leányvár (1938)
- The Henpecked Husband (1938)
- Istvan Bors (1939)
- Janos the Valiant (1939)
- Princess of the Puszta (1939)
- Without Lies (1946)
- Somewhere in Europe (1948)
- Hot Fields (1949)
- A Woman Gets a Start (1949)
- Gala Suit (1949)
- The Marriage of Katalin Kis (1950)
- Singing Makes Life Beautiful (1950)
- Honesty and Glory (1951)
- The Land Is Ours (1951)
- Battle in Peace (1952)
- Try and Win (1952)
- Semmelweis (1952)
- Fourteen Lives (1954)
- Keep Your Chin Up (1954)
- Accident (1955)

== Bibliography ==
- Hayes, R.M. 3-D Movies: A History and Filmography of Stereoscopic Cinema. McFarland, Incorporated, Publishers, 1998.
- Laura, Ernesto G. Tutti i film di Venezia, 1932–1984. La Biennale, Settore cinema e spettacolo televisivo, 1985.
