= Singing Makes Life Beautiful =

1950 film

- Directed by: Márton Keleti
- Written by: István Békeffy; Tibor Méray
- Produced by: Mrs. Miklós Vitéz
- Starring: Imre Soós; Violetta Ferrari; Ferenc Ladányi
- Cinematography: Barnabás Hegyi
- Edited by: Sándor Zákonyi
- Music by: Tibor Polgár
- Production company: Magyar Filmgyártó Állami Vállalat
- Release date: 24 September 1950
- Running time: 70 minutes
- Country: Hungary
- Language: Hungarian

Singing Makes Life Beautiful (Hungarian: Dalolva szép az élet) is a 1950 Hungarian musical comedy film directed by Márton Keleti and starring Imre Soós, Violetta Ferrari and Ferenc Ladányi. It was shot at the Hunnia Studios in Budapest. The film's sets were designed by the art director József Pán.

== Synopsis ==
In the choral society of a factory, there is a division between those who prefer traditional music and those enthralled by modern music such a swing.

== Cast ==
- Imre Soós as Torma Feri
- Violetta Ferrari as Kádas Zsóka
- Ferenc Ladányi as Lakatos párttitkár
- Samu Balázs as Réz Gyõzõ, karnagy
- Kálmán Latabár as Seregély Bálint
- Gyula Gózon as öreg Kádas
- József Bihari as Berta bácsi
- László Kozák as Horváth
- Árpád Lehotay as Deák
- József Simándi as Varga Pali
- László Bánhidi as Kandi
- Sándor Tompa as Szarda Pali
- Zoltán Makláry as Galamb
- Imre Pongrácz as Swing Tóni
- János Gálcsiki as Nagy István
- Lajos Mányai as Clerk
- Géza Szigeti as Boy ironworker
- András Tollas as Boy ironworker
- Csaba Füzesi as Boy ironworker
- Hédi Váradi as A nézõ

== Soundtrack ==
The film's soundtrack features songs from the composers' repertoire: Novilov, Ferenc Erkel, Lajos Bárdos, Ferenc Farkas, Ferenc Szabó, Béla Tardos.

== Bibliography ==
- Liehm, Mira & Liehm, Antonín J. The Most Important Art: Soviet and Eastern European Film After 1945. University of California Press, 1980.
