= Requiem (1982 film) =

1982 film

- Directed by: Zoltán Fábri
- Written by: Zoltán Fábri; István Örkény
- Starring: Edit Frajt
- Cinematography: György Illés
- Edited by: Mária Szécsényi
- Release date: 4 February 1982
- Running time: 103 minutes
- Country: Hungary
- Language: Hungarian

Requiem is a 1982 Hungarian drama film directed by Zoltán Fábri. It was entered into the 32nd Berlin International Film Festival, where it won the Silver Bear for an outstanding single achievement.

== Cast ==
- Edit Frajt - Netti (Hungarian dubbing: Nóra Káldi)
- Lajos Balázsovits - Hannover István
- László Gálffi - Pelle Gyula
- György Kálmán - Ágoston doktor
- László György - Cellatárs
- György Miklósy - Head Waiter (as György Miklósi)
- Antal Konrád - Német katona
- Mátyás Usztics - Szabadult fogoly
- József Fonyó - ÁVH-s
- János Kovács - Rendõr az õrszobán
- Teréz Várhegyi - hair-dresser
- András Ambrus - policeman
- Imre Surányi - Nagy XII., policeman
- Flóra Kádár – pedicurist
