= Köszönöm, megvagyunk =

1981 film

- Directed by: László Lugossy
- Written by: István Kardos
- Starring: József Madaras
- Cinematography: József Lörincz
- Edited by: Margit Galamb
- Release date: 12 February 1981
- Running time: 101 minutes
- Country: Hungary
- Language: Hungarian

Köszönöm, megvagyunk (Thank you, we'll be fine) is a 1981 Hungarian drama film directed by László Lugossy. It was entered into the 31st Berlin International Film Festival.

== Cast ==
- József Madaras - B. József
- Júlia Nyakó - Éva (as Nyakó Juli)
- Lajos Szabó - Béla bácsi
- Ágnes Kakassy - Béla bácsi felesége (as Kakassy Ági)
- Ferenc Bács - Müvezetõ
- Myrtill Madaras - József's daughter
- Miklós Zoltai - Supervisor
- Vilmos Kun - Orvos
- Erzsi Benkocs - Munkáslány (as Benkócs Erzsébet)
- József Lajtos - Rendõr
- Albert Lovassy - Mentõorvos (uncredited)
