= Storm (1952 film) =

1952 film

- Directed by: Zoltán Fábri
- Written by: Ernö Urbán
- Produced by: László Szirtes
- Starring: József Bihari; Manyi Kiss; Ferenc Bessenyei
- Cinematography: György Illés
- Edited by: Zoltán Kerényi
- Music by: Ferenc Farkas
- Production company: Magyar Filmgyártó Nemzeti Vállalat
- Release date: 25 December 1952
- Running time: 115 minutes
- Country: Hungary
- Language: Hungarian

Storm (Hungarian: Vihar) is a 1952 Hungarian drama film directed by Zoltán Fábri and starring József Bihari, Manyi Kiss and Ferenc Bessenyei. It was shot at the Hunnia Studios in Budapest. The film's sets and costumes were designed by the art director István Köpeczi-Boócz.

== Cast ==
- József Bihari as Gilicze Péter
- Manyi Kiss as Giliczéné
- Ferenc Bessenyei as Pörneczi Gáspár, Tsz elnök
- Magda Olthy as Pörnecziné
- Tibor Molnár as Göndöcs Gyula párttitkár
- Endre Szemethy as Csete István kanász
- Béla Barsi as Illés Kálmán
- Márta Fónay as Illésné
- László Misoga as Mentes Károly
- Irma Vass as Mentesné
- Lajos Soós as Mentes Géza
- József Vándor as Gerse Imre kovács
- Imre Sinkovits as Süle Elek
- Teri Náray as Kupi Terka adminisztrátor
- Juci Komlós as Csonka Mária a gépállomás igazgatója
- László Bánhidi as Árendas József középparaszt
- Erzsi Pápai as Árendás Juci
- Ferenc Pethes as M. Forgó Lajos
- István Egri as Solyom István járási tanácselnök
- Mihály Selmeczy as Bánkuti Antal osztályvezetõ
- Sándor Deák as Községi tanácselnök
- John Bartha as flautist, tractor driver and one of the reapers
- Béla Károlyi as villager and one of the reapers

== Bibliography ==
- Cunningham, John. Hungarian Cinema: From Coffee House to Multiplex. Wallflower Press, 2004.
- Liehm, Mira & Liehm, Antonín J. The Most Important Art: Soviet and Eastern European Film After 1945. University of California Press, 1980.
- Rîpeanu, Bujor. (ed.) International Directory of Cinematographers, Set- and Costume Designers in Film: Hungary (from the beginnings to 1988). Saur, 1981.
