= Try and Win =

1952 film

- Romanian poster
- Directed by: Márton Keleti
- Written by: Károly Nóti; István Békeffy
- Based on: Novel by György Szepesi and Gyula Gulyás
- Produced by: Mrs. Miklós Vitéz
- Starring: Imre Soós; János Görbe; Violetta Ferrari
- Cinematography: György Illés
- Edited by: Sándor Zákonyi
- Music by: Tamás Bródy; Szabolcs Fényes
- Production company: Mafilm
- Release date: 24 February 1952
- Running time: 102 minutes
- Country: Hungary
- Language: Hungarian

Try and Win (Hungarian: Civil a pályán) is a 1952 Hungarian sports comedy film directed by Márton Keleti and starring Imre Soós, János Görbe and Violetta Ferrari. It was shot at the Hunnia Studios in Budapest and on location around Lake Balaton. The film's sets were designed by the art director József Pán. It was one of the most popular Hungarian films of the era, attracting just under four and a half million spectators at the box office.

== Cast ==
- Imre Soós as Rácz Pista
- János Görbe as Dunai százados
- Violetta Ferrari as Teleki Marika
- Ferenc Szusza as Teleki jóska
- Kálmán Latabár as Karikás
- Gyula Gózon as Lajos bácsi
- Sándor Peti as Inke bácsi
- Sándor Tompa as Csótány
- Lajos Rajczy as Mészáros
- János Zách as Bakos,Ü.B.titkár
- Hilda Gobbi as Rácz néni
- Lajos Mányai as Edzõ
- Ilona Dajbukát as Erzsi néni
- János Gálcsiki as Varga Pali
- Gyula Árkos as Lakatos
- Árpád Latabár as Szakállas
- Gyula Tapolczay as Gecsõ, sportfelelõs
- György Solthy as Bogdán
- Sándor Pethes as Kubanek
- Béla Károlyi as policeman

== Bibliography ==
- Balski, Grzegorz . Directory of Eastern European Film-makers and Films 1945-1991. Flicks Books, 1992.
- Cunningham, John. Hungarian Cinema: From Coffee House to Multiplex. Wallflower Press, 2004.
- Ostrowska, Dorota, Pitassio, Francesco & Varga, Zsuzsanna. Popular Cinemas in East Central Europe: Film Cultures and Histories. Bloomsbury Publishing, 2017
