= The Fifth Seal =

1976 Hungarian war political psychological drama film by Zoltán Fábri

- Directed by: Zoltán Fábri
- Written by: Zoltán Fábri; Ferenc Sánta
- Starring: Lajos Őze; László Márkus; Zoltán Latinovits
- Cinematography: György Illés
- Edited by: Mária Szécsényi
- Music by: György Vukán
- Production company: Budapest Filmstúdió
- Release date: 7 October 1976
- Running time: 106 minutes
- Country: Hungary
- Language: Hungarian

The Fifth Seal (Hungarian: Az ötödik pecsét) is a 1976 Hungarian war political psychological drama film by Zoltán Fábri based on the 1963 novel of the same name by Hungarian author Ferenc Sánta. It won the Golden Prize at the 10th Moscow International Film Festival and it was entered into the 27th Berlin International Film Festival. The film was also selected as the Hungarian entry for the Best Foreign Language Film at the 49th Academy Awards, but was not accepted as a nominee. The movie is widely considered one of the greatest masterpieces of Hungarian cinema, one of the best movies of 1976, of the 70s and of the 20th century, as well one of the best war, philosophical and political movies of all time.

== Plot ==
In December 1944 during the reign of the Arrow Cross Party in World War II, four friends are chatting around the table of a bar owned by Béla when a wounded photographer who has just come back from the battlefront joins them. During their gathering, two Arrow Cross officers come in for a drink. After leaving, the group bitterly refer to them as murderers.

One of the friends, a watchmaker named Miklós Gyuricza, poses a moral question to János about two hypothetical characters, Tomóceusz Katatiki and Gyugyu: Tomóceusz Katatiki was the leader of an imaginary island, and Gyugyu was his slave. The powerful and careless Katatiki treated the poor Gyugyu with extreme brutality, but never felt any remorse as he lived by the barbarian morality of his age. Gyugyu lived in misery and suffering but found comfort in the fact that whatever cruelty happens to him it is never caused by him and he is still a guiltless person with a clear conscience. What would he choose, if he had to die and reincarnate as one of them?

The photographer says that he would choose Gyugyu, but the others don't believe him. As they go home we get to know some of the deepest secrets of their lives. It turns out that Gyuricza is hiding Jewish children at his flat. Meanwhile, László drinks excessively, plagued with the question Gyuricza posed, and experiences hallucinations in his drunken stupor.

The next evening, the four friends are at the bar again when Arrow Cross officers arrest them after being advised the friends called the party officers murderers. They are taken to an office of the party where an Arrow Cross official (Zoltán Latinovits) forces them to slap a dying partisan in the face in order to be freed. Gyuricza is the only one that complies. Gyuricza exits the building, severely disturbed by what transpired. As he walks through the city, buildings explode and crumble.

== Cast ==
- Lajos Őze - Miklós Gyuricza (Gyuricza Miklós)
- László Márkus - László Király (Király László)
- Ferenc Bencze - Béla
- Sándor Horváth - János Kovács (Kovács János)
- István Dégi - Károly Keszei (Keszei Károly)
- Zoltán Latinovits - civvies
- Gábor Nagy - the blonde one
- György Bánffy - the high one
- József Vándor - Macák
- Noémi Apor - Mrs Kovács (Kovácsné)
- Ildikó Pécsi - Irén
- Marianna Moór - Lucy (as Moór Mariann)
- Rita Békés - Erzsi
- György Cserhalmi - dying communist
- Gábor Kiss - Guard
- Gabriella Kiss - Gyuricza's daughter

== Critical reception ==
Peter Bradshaw of The Guardian reviewed, "It’s an arrestingly spiky political cabaret of cruelty and fear, recognisably from the same era of European cinema that brought us Pasolini’s Salò or Marco Ferreri’s La Grande Bouffe."

== See also ==
- List of submissions to the 49th Academy Awards for Best Foreign Language Film
- List of Hungarian submissions for the Academy Award for Best Foreign Language Film
