= László Lugossy =

Hungarian film director

- Born: 23 October 1939 (age 86); Budapest, Hungary
- Occupation: Film director
- Years active: 1976–1995

László Lugossy (born 23 October 1939) is a Hungarian film director.

In 1976, his film Man Without a Name was entered into the 26th Berlin International Film Festival, where it won the Silver Bear for an outstanding single achievement. In 1981, he was a member of the jury at the 12th Moscow International Film Festival.

His 1981 film Köszönöm, megvagyunk was entered into the 31st Berlin International Film Festival. The following year, he was a member of the jury at the 32nd Berlin International Film Festival. In 1985, his film Flowers of Reverie won the Silver Bear - Special Jury Prize at the 35th Berlin International Film Festival.

== Selected filmography ==
- Man Without a Name (1976)
- Köszönöm, megvagyunk (1981)
- Flowers of Reverie (1985)
