= Kékkút =

- Location of Veszprém county in Hungary

- Location of Kékkút
- Coordinates: 46.84989°N 17.55837°E
- Country: Hungary
- County: Veszprém

Area
  - Total: 3.68 km^{2} (1.42 sq mi)

Population (2017)
  - Total: 64
  - Density: 17/km^{2} (45/sq mi)
- Time zone: UTC+1 (CET)
  - Summer (DST): UTC+2 (CEST)
- Postal code: 8254
- Area code: 87

Kékkút is a village in Veszprém county, Hungary.

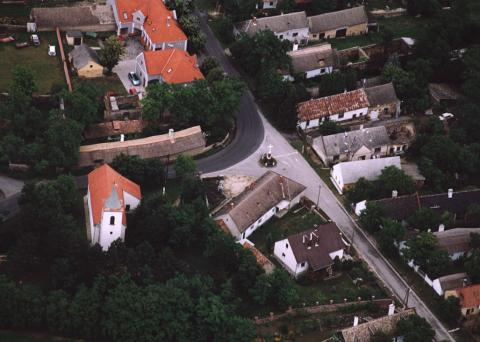
Aerial photography of Kékkút
