= Present Indicative =

1972 film

- Directed by: Péter Bacsó
- Written by: Péter Zimre; Péter Bacsó
- Starring: András Kovács
- Cinematography: János Zsombolyai
- Release date: 13 January 1972
- Running time: 111 minutes
- Country: Hungary
- Language: Hungarian

Present Indicative (Hungarian: Jelenidő) is a 1972 Hungarian drama film co-written and directed by Péter Bacsó. The film was selected as the Hungarian entry for the Best Foreign Language Film at the 45th Academy Awards, but was not accepted as a nominee.

== Cast ==
- József Borsóhalmi as Somogyi bácsi
- Irén Bódis as Mózesné, Irén
- Ágnes Dávid as Zsófika
- Gabriella Koszta as Ica
- András Kovács as Kalocsa
- Tibor Liska as Kulcsár
- Lehel Ohidy as Takács, párttitkár (as Óhidy Lehel)
- Klára Pápai as Mózes anyja
- Ádám Rajhona as Kárász
- Ágoston Simon as Mózes Imre (as Simon Ágoston)
- László Sugár as Nagy
- Ferenc Szabó as Gyula bácsi
- Lajos Szabó as Görbe

== See also ==
- List of submissions to the 45th Academy Awards for Best Foreign Language Film
- List of Hungarian submissions for the Academy Award for Best Foreign Language Film
