= András Jeles =

Hungarian film director and actor (born 1945)

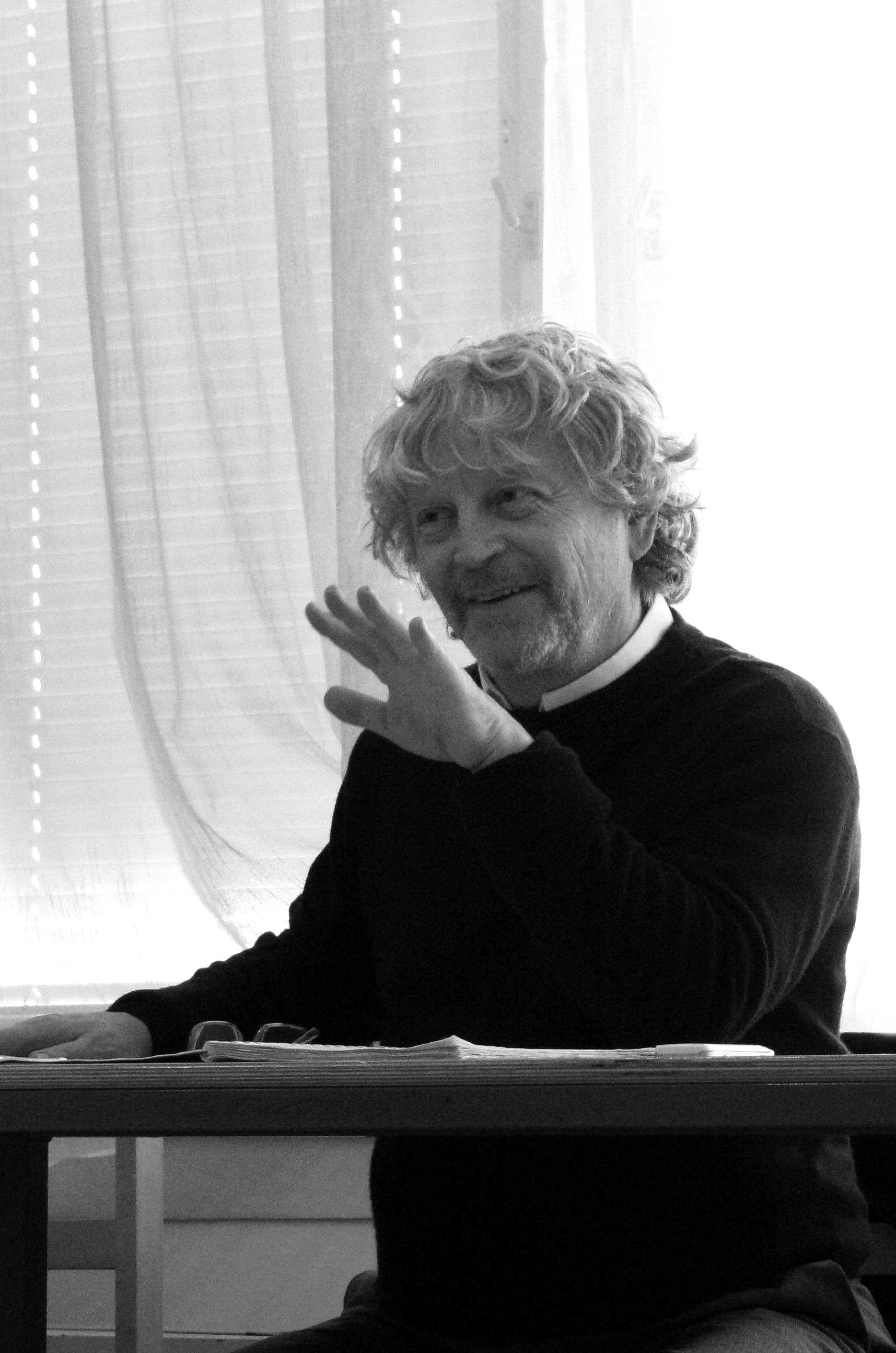
- Born: 27 March 1945 (age 81); Jászberény, Hungary
- Occupations: Film director Actor
- Years active: 1970-present

András Jeles (born 27 March 1945) is a Hungarian film director and writer. Director of the 1984 film The Annunciation. His son László Nemes is also a film director.

== Career ==
In his homeland, he is best known for his first feature film, 1979's Little Valentino, about a working-class boy who embezzles a large sum of money and then spends a whole day trying to spend it. One of the most important Hungarian films, part of the New Budapest Twelve.

His 1983 film Dream Brigade, about factory workers unsuccessfully preparing to perform a Soviet play, was only allowed to be screened at the time of the fall of communism. It was the last (feature) film of the Kádár era to be banned, and was not released until 1989 (in addition to the ironic portrayal of the working class, Lenin himself appears in the 56th minute, subjected to a bag check by the company porter to make sure he hasn't stolen anything...)

Also in 1983, he made his own adaptation of The Tragedy of Man, The Annunciation, in which he cast children in the lead roles.

Besides filmmaking, he has also worked on avant-garde plays.
