= Ferenc Sánta =

Hungarian novelist and screenwriter

Ferenc Sánta (September 4, 1927 – June 6, 2008) was a Hungarian novelist and film screenwriter. He was awarded the József Attila Prize in 1956 and 1964, and the prestigious Kossuth Prize in 1973. He was born in Braṣov and died in Budapest.

== Selected works ==
- Sokan voltunk, 1954
- Téli virágzás, 1956
- Farkasok a küszöbön, 1961
- Az ötödik pecsét, 1963
- Húsz óra, 1963
- Az áruló, 1966
- Isten a szekéren, 1970
- Kicsik és nagyok, 1982
- A szabadság küszöbén
- Halálnak halála, 1994

== Filmography ==
- Húsz óra (1965) (based on his novel; English title, Twenty Hours). The film won the Grand Prix at the 1965 Moscow International Film Festival, and the UNICRIT Award at the 1965 Venice Film Festival.
- Az Ötödik pecsét (1976) (based on his novel; English title, The Fifth Seal). The film won the Golden Prize at the 1977 Moscow International Film Festival. It was nominated to the Golden Berlin Bear at Berlin International Film Festival in 1977.
- Éjszaka (1989) (writer).

== Awards ==
- József Attila Prize (1956 and 1964)
- Arany Nimfa Prize (Monte Carlo, 1970)
- Kossuth Prize (1973)
- Magyar Köztársasági Érdemrend Tisztikeresztje (1993)
- Hazám Prize (2004)
- Magyar Muvészetért Prize (2004)
