= Guido Cinotti =

Italian painter

Guido Cinotti (1870 – 1932) was an Italian painter, mainly depicting still lifes and rural landscapes.

He was born in Siena, moved as a young man to Milan to study at the Brera Academy. In 1894, his painting, Conigli, won him the Brera Academy's Mylius Prize. He was influenced by Filippo Carcano and later by the Divisionism of Giovanni Segantini. The Museo del Paesaggio at Verbania has two landscapes, titled Nevicata and Marina, by the artist. An exhibition of Cinotti paintings took place in 1934 at the Galleria Pesaro of Milan. An image of Study of Pigs (1896) is available online.

He died in Milan. He left several unsigned works on his death: the authentication was entrusted by his widow, Cena, to his friends Carlo Bazzi and Angiolo D'Andrea. His daughter, born in 1920, was the art historian Mia Cinotti (real name Amalia), who died by suicide in 1992.
