= The Tragedy of Man =

Hungarian play written by Imre Madách

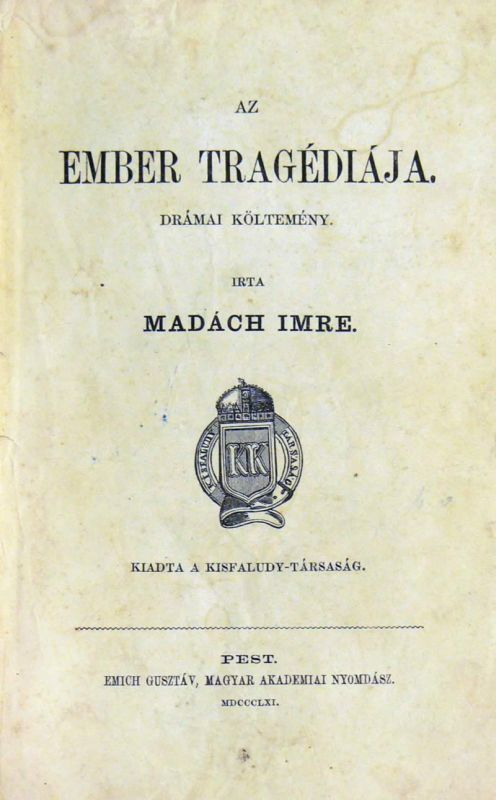
- First edition
- Author: Imre Madách
- Original title: Az ember tragédiája
- Language: Hungarian
- Genre: Play, drama
- Publication date: 1861
- Publication place: Hungary

The Tragedy of Man (Hungarian: Az ember tragédiája) is a play written by the Hungarian author Imre Madách. It was first published in 1861. The play is considered to be one of the major works of Hungarian literature and is one of the most often staged Hungarian plays today. Many lines have become common quotations in Hungary. The 1984 film The Annunciation (Angyali üdvözlet) was based on the play, as was the 2011 animated film The Tragedy of Man.

== Synopsis ==
The main characters are Adam, Eve and Lucifer. As God creates the universe, Lucifer, the "ancient spirit of denial", decries it as futile, stating that mankind will aspire to be gods, demanding their ownership of the world, because man was created in the image of God.

God casts Lucifer out of Heaven but grants his wish: the two cursed trees in Eden, the Tree of Knowledge and the Tree of Immortality. Playing on Eve's vanity and Adam's pride, Lucifer tempts both into sin. After the Fall and expulsion from Eden, Adam is still too proud to admit that he acted wrongly. Instead, he recounts his dreams of human progress and achievement; he feels that now, unencumbered by God's rules, he is ready to pursue his own glory.

Lucifer puts Adam to sleep, and the two begin to travel through history. The first period they visit, ancient Egypt, is the realization of Adam's dream of immense human achievements. However, his joy is abruptly cut off when he finds that the pyramids are being built on the backs of slaves (as a later-executed slave points out, "millions for one"). Adam, in the role of a pharaoh, falls in love with Eve, a slave-girl; with renewed hope, he now tells Lucifer to take him to a world where all men live in equality, and Lucifer transports him to ancient Greece. Adam's dream of democracy becomes reality, but it quickly collapses into demagoguery and mob rule, until he espaces to the next scene. In each period, Adam's previous dreams are exposed as futile, flawed, or unattainable; Eve appears just in time to refresh Adam's spirit; and the cycle repeats.

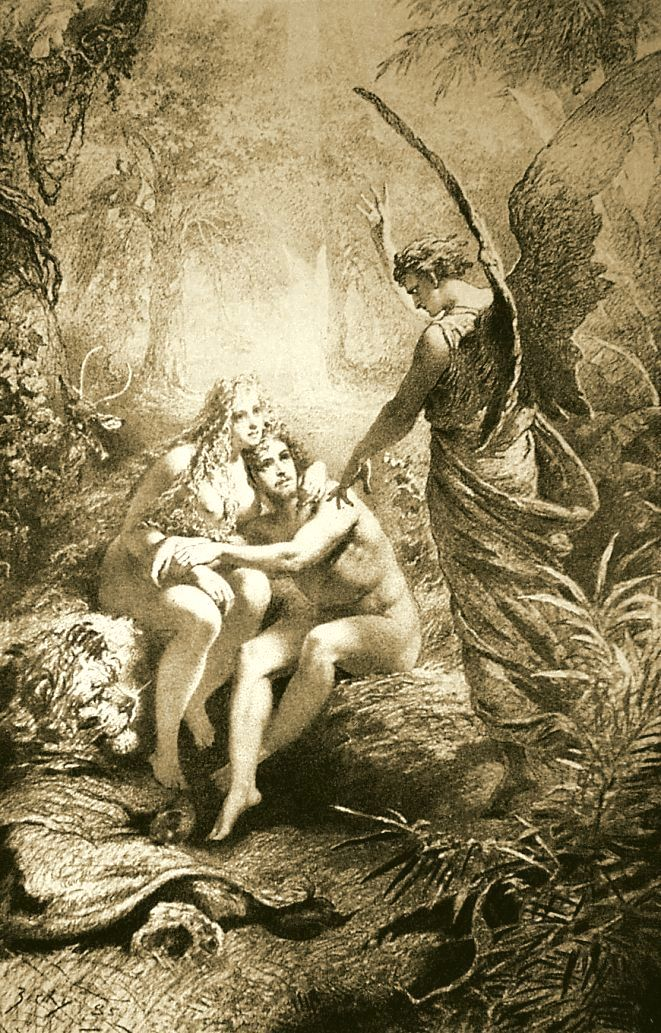
The Expulsion; illustration by Mihály Zichy

Adam and Lucifer are introduced at the beginning of each scene, with Adam assuming various important historical roles and Lucifer usually acting as a servant or confidant. Eve enters only later in each scene, usually as a historical character. Adam is usually engrossed in his role at the beginning of each scene, and only becomes self-aware and aware of Lucifer as his guide near the end. Eve never breaks out of character.

From the 19th century, Adam is no longer a leader, but retreats into an observer role, his political and historical enthusiasm having disappeared. Likewise, throughout the dream, Adam is older and older with each passing scene, representing not only his increasing wisdom but also the increasing burden of hopelessness.

The final dream scene is in an ice age in the far future. The Sun is dying, civilization has disappeared, and mankind has been reduced to a few scattered savages trying to eke out a living. It is never addressed whether this is truly the future Madách foresaw, or whether this is an elaborate illusion on the part of Lucifer to make Adam lose hope once and for all.

Awaking from his dream, Adam declares that the future is hopeless, and that the only course of action now open to him is to kill himself, thereby ending the human race before it begins and preventing all the meaningless suffering the future holds. As he is poised to throw himself from a cliff, Eve finds him, and happily announces that she is pregnant. Adam falls to his knees and declares that God has vanquished him.

God rebukes Satan, and tells Adam that regardless of whether he sees hope or not, his task is only to "strive on, and have faith."

=== Sequence of scenes ===
The Tragedy of Man contains fifteen scenes, with ten historical periods represented. The scenes, their locations, and the identity of the main protagonists in each are as follows.

SCENE 1 – In Heaven, immediately following the creation.
SCENE 2 – In the Garden of Eden at the Beginning of Human History, likely around 75,000 BC.
SCENE 3 – Outside the Garden of Eden at the Beginning of Human History.
SCENE 4 – Egypt, c. 2686-2648 BC. Adam is a Pharaoh, most likely Djoser; Lucifer his Vizier Imhotep; Eve is the widow of a slave.
SCENE 5 – Athens, 490-489 BC. Adam is Miltiades the Younger; Lucifer is a city guard; Eve is Miltiades's wife.
SCENE 6 – Rome, c. 67 AD. Adam is a wealthy Roman; Lucifer is his friend, Eve is a prostitute.
SCENE 7 – Constantinople, 1096-1099 AD. Adam is Tancred, Prince of Galilee; Lucifer is his squire; Eve is a noble maiden forced to become a nun.
SCENE 8 – Prague, c. 1608. Adam is Johannes Kepler; Lucifer is his pupil; Eve is his wife, Barbara.
SCENE 9 – Paris, 1793-1794 (in a dream of Kepler). Adam is Georges Danton; Lucifer is an executioner; Eve appears in two forms, first as an aristocrat about to be executed, then immediately following as a bloodthirsty poor woman.
SCENE 10 – Prague, c. 1612. Adam is Johannes Kepler; Lucifer is his pupil; Eve is his wife, Barbara.
SCENE 11 – London, 19th century. Adam and Lucifer are nameless Englishmen; Eve is a young woman of the middle class.
SCENE 12 – A utopist socialist Phalanstery, in the future (most likely c. 2000 AD). Adam and Lucifer masquerade as traveling chemists; Eve is a worker who protests when she is separated from her child.
SCENE 13 – Space. Adam and Lucifer are themselves, taking stock of what has come to light so far; Eve does not appear in this scene.
SCENE 14 – An ice age in the distant future, at least 6000 AD. Adam is a broken old man; Lucifer is himself; Eve is an Eskimo's wife.
SCENE 15 – Outside Eden at the Beginning of Human History.

== Interpretation ==
The play is invariably compared to John Milton's Paradise Lost, as the two deal with the same subject matter—the creation and fall of Man, and the devil's role in it. As in Paradise Lost, some critics maintain that the true protagonist of the Tragedy is Lucifer himself, being more active than Adam and God combined. Milton offers a more well-rounded Lucifer, however; he is motivated chiefly by a desire for power, and all his actions stem from that, rather than from any specifically malicious drive. Madách's version is significantly more one-sidedly villainous, seeking to destroy mankind simply to prove God's creation experiment a failure. This spite, combined with his charisma in dealing with Adam and Eve, make him a decidedly sinister character, more so than Milton's.

Some critics suggest that the unique portrayal of Eve, the first woman, was prompted by Madách's own unhappy marriage. Eve is both the vehicle of Adam's fall, offering him the apple, but through her appearance in each scene, is also usually the means by which Adam regains his hope for the future. In the end, she is the force which prevents his demise. The relationship between man and woman is indeed at the heart of the play, portrayed as being both deeply flawed on the one hand, yet still affirmed as the basic human relationship.

While these interpretations may be up for discussion, the role of Hegelian dialectic in the sequencing of scenes is an established fact. Each scene, each historical period, is the realization of some ideal of Adam (thesis), which Lucifer then exposes as being deeply flawed (antithesis). Adam, on the verge of losing hope, comes into contact with Eve, and decides upon a new ideal (synthesis) which would cure the worst problems of his present reality. The cycle then repeats. But each time Lucifer shows an age to Adam, he deceives Adam: Lucifer always shows the age not when the new ideal was ascending and contributed to the well-being of the human race. Instead, Lucifer and Adam experience the declining phase of the ages. Thus, contrary to Hegel's philosophy, what Adam sees is that humanity does not constantly build towards a glorious future, but is slowly sinking into worse and worse depravity.

This leads to the most famous and one of the most controversial elements of the play. Adam cannot understand what the purpose of his existence is if mankind's future is so bleak. The last line is spoken by God: "Mondottam, ember, küzdj és bízva bízzál!" ("I have told you, Man: strive on, and have faith!") Depending on the interpretation, this can either be seen cynically as the words of a capricious deity, or else pointing to a "hope beyond all hope," that God has a purpose for all things which man may not necessarily comprehend. This is markedly different from Paradise Lost, where the Christian hope is explicitly spelled out.

It may therefore be tempting to suggest that The Tragedy of Man is not really a Christian play. It is, in fact, rather critical of historical Christianity. However, it is really only the institutional Roman Catholic Church that comes under direct attack. His brief portrayal of the early church, and St. Peter specifically, is also completely positive. It is certain that Madách's contemporaries likewise saw the play as unquestionably Christian in character. János Arany, who proofread Madách's poetry, was at first so disgusted by Lucifer's apparent blasphemous behaviour in the first scene that he refused to read further; however, once Madách begged him to read it to the end, he felt that the rest of the play's Christianity justified and explained what he had at first misinterpreted. Therefore, the interpretation of God as a capricious and arbitrary deity who wants to see his creations toil and suffer for no purpose does not seem to fit with Madách's probable intentions.

Literary influence, notably from Milton's Paradise Lost and Goethe's Faust, cannot be overlooked. Both notably contributed to the representation of the Lucifer, that takes characteristics from both Milton's Satan and Goethe's Mephistopheles. Likewise, existentialist themes reflecting on the apparent absurdity of existence are present throughout; Kierkegaard's influence can also be inferred, especially in the ending, which affirms both the world's meaninglessness and the meaningfulness of striving for God.

== Adaptations ==
=== Stage ===
The poem is quite suitable for the stage, but a bit lengthy. German, Czech and Polish theaters have staged adaptations.

=== Opera ===
There are also two operas based on the play: a two-act mystery opera ("Az ember tragédiája") by the Hungarian composer György Ránki and a very large-scale work by the English composer Clive Strutt ("The Tragedy of Man").

=== Animation ===
Marcell Jankovics directed the animated film The Tragedy of Man, produced from 1988 to 2011 at Pannonia Film Studio. Some of the segments were showcased individually over the years, and the finished 160-minute feature film was finally released in 2011.

=== Cinema ===
Directed by András Jeles, Angyali üdvözlet (The Annunciation) was released in 1984, in which children play all the characters.
