= György Illés =

Hungarian cinematographer

- Born: 2 November 1914; Eger, Austro-Hungarian Empire
- Died: 12 June 2006 (aged 91); Budapest, Hungary
- Occupation: Cinematographer
- Years active: 1947–1997 (film)

György Illés (1914–2006) was a Hungarian cinematographer. Along with Barnabás Hegyi he was trained by István Eiben.

== Selected filmography ==
- The Land Is Ours (1951)
- Baptism of Fire (1952)
- Storm (1952)
- Try and Win (1952)
- Young Hearts (1953)
- Kiskrajcár (1953)
- Keep Your Chin Up (1954)
- Ward 9 (1955)
- Springtime in Budapest (1955)
- The Bridge of Life (1956)
- Danse Macabre (1958)
- St. Peter's Umbrella (1958)
- The House Under the Rocks (1958)
- Sleepless Years (1959)
- The Poor Rich (1959)
- Drama of the Lark (1963)
- Twenty Hours (1965)
- Walls (1968)
- The Toth Family (1969)
- The Boys of Paul Street (1969)
- The Pendragon Legend (1974)
- 141 Minutes from the Unfinished Sentence (1975)
- The Fifth Seal (1976)
- Hungarians (1978)
- Temporary Paradise (1981)
- Requiem (1982)
- Titanic - Nachspiel einer Katastrophe (1984)

== Bibliography ==
- Burns, Bryan. World Cinema: Hungary. Fairleigh Dickinson University Press, 1996.
- Cunningham, John. Hungarian Cinema: From Coffee House to Multiplex. Wallflower Press, 2004.
