= Man Without a Name (1976 film) =

1976 film

- Directed by: László Lugossy
- Written by: Luca Karall; István Kardos
- Starring: György Cserhalmi
- Cinematography: József Lörincz
- Edited by: Zoltán Farkas
- Release date: 1 April 1976
- Running time: 93 minutes
- Country: Hungary
- Language: Hungarian

Man Without a Name (Hungarian: Azonosítás) is a 1976 Hungarian drama film directed by László Lugossy. It was entered into the 26th Berlin International Film Festival where it won the Silver Bear for an outstanding single achievement.

== Cast ==
- György Cserhalmi - Ambrus András
- Róbert Koltai - Kelemen
- Ludovít Gresso - Miska bácsi (as Ludovit Gressó)
- Mari Kiss - Sári
- Péter Blaskó - Rendőrhadnagy
- Judit Pogány - Vöröskeresztes nő
- Sándorné Czár - Annus néni
- Géza Polgár - Fogadóbizottsági tag
- István Jeney - Fogadóbizottsági tag
- László Soós - Kártyás (as László Sós)
- Lili Monori - Csatóné
- István Szilágyi - Katona
- Tibor Molnár - Péter bácsi
- Hédi Temessy - Énekesnő
- István Hunyadkürthy - Hadifogoly (as Hunyadkürti István)
- József Madaras - Csató Mihály
- Piroska Molnár - Kötényes nõ
