= Violetta Ferrari =

Hungarian actress (1930–2014)

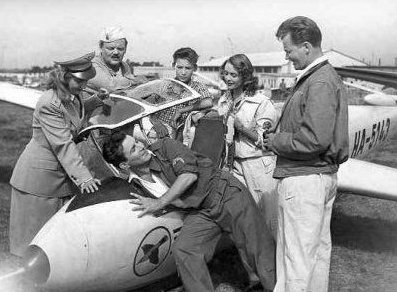
- In the 1954 film 2 times 2 sometimes makes 5 (2x2 néha 5)
- Born: 25 April 1930; Hódmezővásárhely, Hungary
- Died: 23 January 2014 (aged 83); Budapest, Hungary
- Occupation: Actress
- Years active: 1950–1983
- Spouse(s): Lajos Básti (1949-1954); János Földiák (1955-1973)

Violetta Ferrari (25 April 1930 – 23 January 2014) was a Hungarian actress. She died on 23 January 2014, aged 83, in Budapest.

== Selected filmography ==
- Singing Makes Life Beautiful (1950)
- Try and Win (1952)
- Keep Your Chin Up (1954)
- A Strange Mask of Identity (1955)
- Accident (1955)
- Paprika (1959)
- Grounds for Divorce (1960)
- Johnny Belinda (1961, TV film)
- Bel Ami (1968, TV film)
