= Péter Bacsó =

Hungarian film director and screenwriter

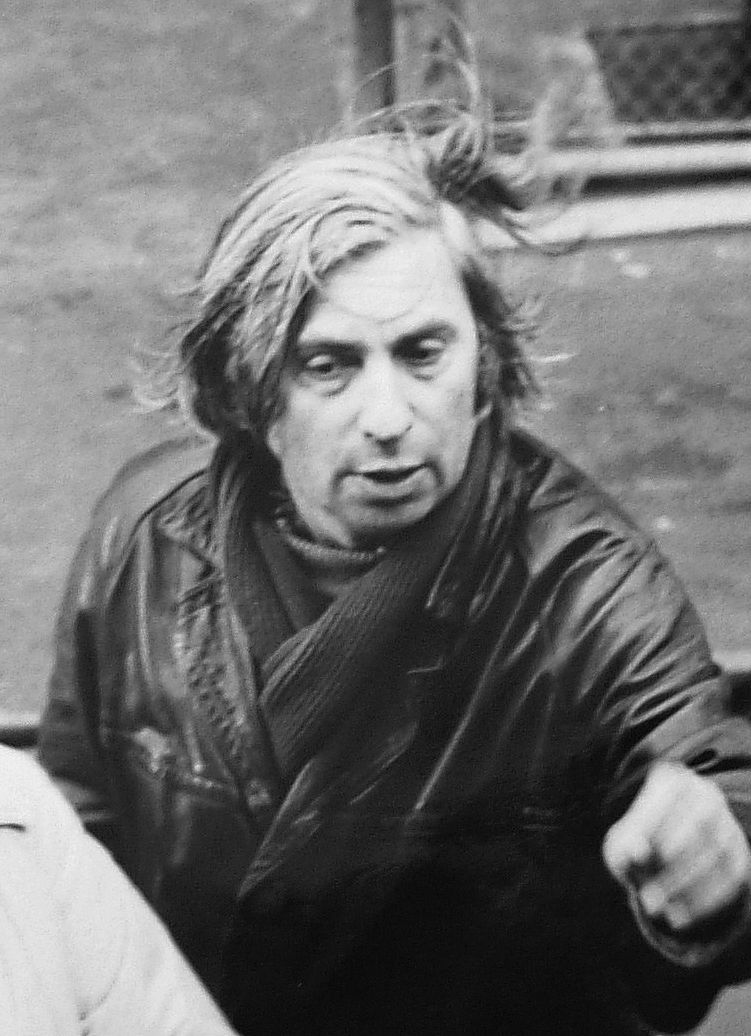
- Péter Bacsó in 1973
- Born: 6 January 1928; Košice, Czechoslovakia (now Slovakia)
- Died: 11 March 2009 (aged 81); Budapest, Hungary
- Years active: 1947–2009

Péter Bacsó (6 January 1928 – 11 March 2009) was a Hungarian film director and screenwriter.

== Early life and education ==
After high school graduation Bacsó wanted to become an actor and later a theatre director, but ultimately decided to try filmmaking. His first job in a film was as an assistant in Géza Radványi's Valahol Európában (Somewhere in Europe) at the age of 19. He continued as a script editor and screenwriter. He graduated at the Hungarian School of Theatrical and Film Arts in 1950. During the 1950s he worked as a script consultant and screenwriter, and directed 33 full-length feature films and TV series.

== Career ==
Bacsó became part of the rebirth of Hungarian cinema scripting the very successful Zoltán Fábri film Sweet Anna (Édes Anna) in 1958. He made his directorial debut with It's Easier in Summer (Nyáron egyszerű), a film about the life of young people at the time, in 1963. He followed up with films that shared the same theme, among them Bicyclists in Love (Szerelmes biciklisták) in 1965 and Summer on the Hill (Nyár a hegyen) in 1967.

He made his most famous film, A tanú (The Witness) in 1969, but it was banned at the time and wasn't released until 1979. The film became a cult classic in Hungary; it is a political satire about the early-1950s Communist regime. The Witness was finally shown in Cannes in 1981.

Bacsó later continued to make mostly political and satirical films, for a wider audience. He made various genre films, trying his hand in musicals, comedies, etc. He continued filmmaking up to his later years, however his last two films were generally dismissed by critics and the public alike as badly written and low quality works. His 2001 film Hamvadó cigarettavég (Smouldering Cigarette) was a biopic of Hungarian actress and singer Katalin Karády. His 2008 film Virtually a Virgin was entered into the 30th Moscow International Film Festival.

Bacsó directed 32 feature films during his career, launching the last on his 80th birthday. Bacsó was presented the Kossuth Prize, Hungary's highest award for artists, in 1985. He received the Middle Cross of the Hungarian Republic in 1998. In 2004, he was named Master of Hungarian Cinema, and he received the Pro Renovanda Cultura Hungariae Foundation main prize in 2008.

At the 2009 Hungarian Film Week he received a lifetime achievement award. During the award ceremony he apologized for having made films that were too sad, and then remarked: "I never wanted to create an oeuvre, but just to enjoy making films."

== Selected filmography ==
- West Zone (1952)
- Keep Your Chin Up (1954)
- Tale on the Twelve Points (1957)
- Crime at Dawn (1960)
- The Witness (1969)
- Present Indicative (1972)
- Let Go of My Beard! [Ereszd el a szakállam] (1975)
- Oh, Bloody Life (1984)
- Virtually a Virgin (2008)
