= 10th Berlin International Film Festival =

1960 film festival in West Berlin, Germany

- Festival poster
- Location: West Berlin, Germany
- Founded: 1951
- Awards: Golden Bear: El Lazarillo de Tormes
- Festival date: 24 June – 5 July 1960
- Website: www.berlinale.de

Berlin International Film Festival chronology
- 11th 9th

The 10th annual Berlin International Film Festival was held from 24 June to 5 July 1960.

The Golden Bear was awarded to El Lazarillo de Tormes directed by César Fernández Ardavín.

== Juries ==
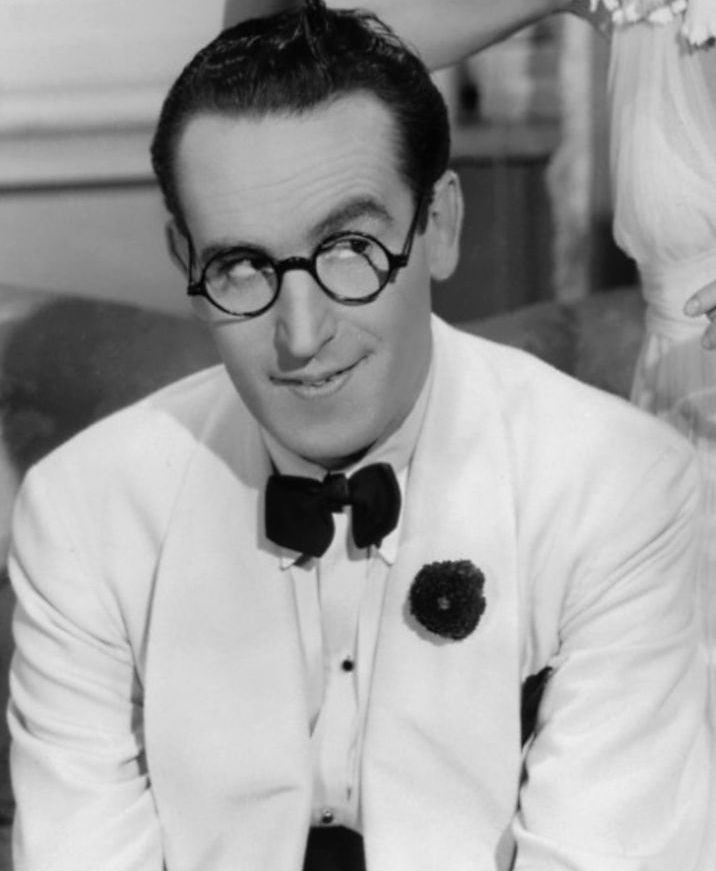
Harold Lloyd, Jury President

The following people were announced as being on the jury for the festival:

=== Main Competition ===
- Harold Lloyd, American actor, filmmaker and producer - Jury President
- Georges Auric, French composer
- Henry Reed, British composer
- Sohrab Modi, Indian actor, filmmaker and producer
- Floris Luigi Ammannati, Italian director of the Venice Film Festival
- Hidemi Ima, Japanese director
- Joaquín de Entrambasaguas, Spanish philologist and historiographer
- Frank Wisbar, West-German filmmaker
- Georg Ramseger, West-German writer
- Werner R. Heymann, West-German composer
- Eva Staar, West-German

=== Documentary and Short Films Competition ===
- Johannes Eckardt, West-German film curator - Jury President
- Tahar Cheriaa, Tunisian founder of the Carthage Film Days
- Ludwig Gesek, Austrian writer and film historian
- Lars Krantz, Swedish television producer
- Edwin Redslob, West-German art historian
- Roberto Alejandro Tálice, Argentinian journalist, film critic and playwright
- Semih Tuğrul, Turkish writer

== Official Sections ==
=== Main Competition ===
The following films were in competition for the Golden Bear award:

| English title | Original title | Director(s) | Production country |
|---|---|---|---|
| A Glass of Water | Das Glas Wasser | Helmut Käutner | West Germany |
| The Angry Silence | | Guy Green | United Kingdom |
| A Woman's Testament | 女経 | Kōzaburō Yoshimura, Kon Ichikawa, Yasuzō Masumura | Japan |
| Breathless | À bout de souffle | Jean-Luc Godard | France |
| Blessings of the Land | Biyaya ng lupa | Manuel Silos | Philippines |
| El Lazarillo de Tormes | | César Fernández Ardavín | Spain, Italy |
| The Fair | Kirmes | Wolfgang Staudte | West Germany, France |
| Faith, Hope and Witchcraft | Tro, håb og trolddom | Erik Balling | Denmark |
| Even the Clouds Are Drifting | 구름은 흘러가도 | Yu Hyun-mok | South Korea |
| Inherit the Wind | | Stanley Kramer | United States |
| In Love But Doubly | Kaks' tavallista Lahtista | Ville Salminen | Finland |
| Love and Larceny | Il Mattatore | Dino Risi | Italy |
| The Love Game | Les Jeux de l'amour | Philippe de Broca | France |
| My Second Brother | にあんちゃん | Shōhei Imamura | Japan |
| My Slave | ทาสของฉัน | Ubol Yugala | Thailand |
| New Light | نیو لائٹ | S. M. Agha | Pakistan |
| The Nightingale's Prayer | دعاء الكروان | Henry Barakat | Egypt |
| Our Last Spring | Ερόικα | Michael Cacoyannis | Greece |
| The Party Is Over | Fin de fiesta | Leopoldo Torre Nilsson | Argentina |
| Pickpocket | | Robert Bresson | France |
| Puberun | পূবেৰুণ | Prabhat Mukherjee | India |
| Sängkammartjuven | | Göran Gentele | Sweden |
| Struggle for Eagle Peak | Venner | Tancred Ibsen | Norway |
| Under Ten Flags | Sotto dieci bandiere | Duilio Coletti | Italy |
| Wild River | | Elia Kazan | United States |

=== Documentary and Short Films Competition ===
| English title | Original title | Director(s) | Production country |
|---|---|---|---|
| Austria Gloriosa | | Edmund von Hammer | Austria |
| Play Ball! | Ballon vole | Jean Dasque | France |
| Diario | | Juan Berend | Argentina |
| Dream of the Wild Horses | Le songe des chevaux sauvages | Denys Colomb de Daunant | France |
| Faja lobbi | | Herman van der Horst | Netherlands |
| Hafenrhythmus | | Wolf Hart | West Germany |
| I vecchi | | Raffaele Andreassi | Italy |
| Jungle Cat | | James Algar | United States |
| Mandara | | René Gardi | Switzerland |
| Men of Brazil | Homens do Brasil | Nelson Marcellino de Carvalho | Brazil |
| Người con của biển cả | | (unknown director) | South Vietnam |
| Der Spielverderber | | Ferdinand Diehl, Boris von Borresholm | West Germany |
| Village Sunday | | Stewart Wilensky | United States |

== Official Awards ==
The following prizes were awarded by the Jury:

=== Main Competition ===
- Golden Bear: El Lazarillo de Tormes by César Fernández Ardavín
- Silver Bear for Best Director: Jean-Luc Godard for Breathless
- Silver Bear for Best Actress: Juliette Mayniel for The Fair
- Silver Bear for Best Actor: Fredric March for Inherit the Wind
- Silver Bear Extraordinary Jury Prize: The Love Game by Philippe de Broca

=== Documentary and Short Films Competition ===
- Golden Bear (Documentaries): Faja lobbi by Herman van der Horst
  - Honorable mention (Documentaries): Mandara by René Gardi
- Short Film Golden Bear: Dream of the Wild Horses by Denys Colomb de Daunant
- Silver Bear for Best Short Film:
  - Der Spielverderber by Ferdinand Diehl and Boris von Borresholm
  - I vecchi by Raffaele Andreassi
  - Diario by Juan Berend
- Silver Bear Extraordinary Jury Prize (Short film): Hest på sommerferie by Astrid Henning-Jensen
  - Honorable mention (Short Film):
    - Austria Gloriosa by Edmund von Hammer
    - Hafenrhythmus by Wolf Hart

== Independent Awards ==
=== FIPRESCI Award ===
- The Angry Silence by Guy Green

=== OCIC Award ===
- The Angry Silence by Guy Green

=== C.I.D.A.L.C. Award ===
- El Lazarillo de Tormes by César Fernández Ardavín

=== Youth Film Award (Jugendfilmpreis) ===
- Best Feature Film Suitable for Young People: Inherit the Wind by Stanley Kramer
  - Honorable Mention: The Angry Silence by Guy Green
- Best Documentary Film Suitable for Young People: Jungle Cat by James Algar
  - Honorable Mention: Mandara by René Gardi
- Best Short Film Suitable for Young People: Người con của biển cả by (unknown director)
  - Honorable Mention: Ballon vole by Jean Dasque
