= Haus Tambaran =

The main entrance of the National Parliament building

Haus Tambaran is a Tok Pisin phrase which describes a type of traditional ancestral worship house in the East Sepik region of Papua New Guinea. The most visually recognizable forms are from the Maprik area, with a tall and elaborately decorated front entrance wall where the ridge pole slopes down low toward the back of the building and the roof follows this decline and often continues all the way to the ground. The Sepik people are renowned for their superb artistic ability in painting and carving, which is often exhibited in these religious structures.

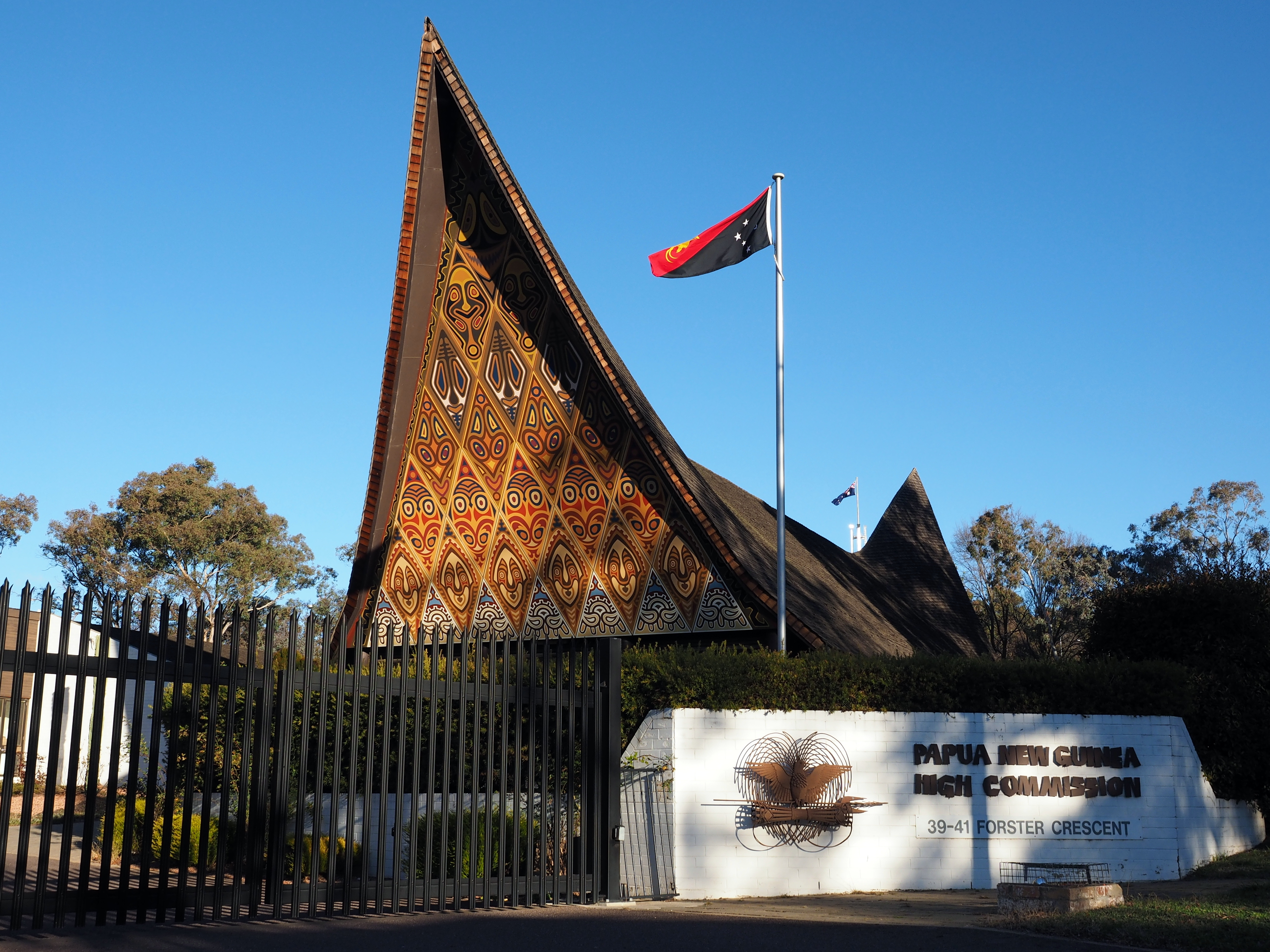
High Commission of Papua New Guinea in Canberra

The front entrance of the modern National Parliament (which is sometimes referred to informally as Haus Tambaran) building in Port Moresby is modelled on traditional haus tambaran architecture. It can be viewed on Google Earth at Latitude: 9°25'41.69"S, Longitude: 147°11'33.45"E, and is depicted on the Papua New Guinea 50 Kina note. The High Commission of Papua New Guinea in Canberra, Australia, is also influenced by haus tambaran.

Haus Tambaran have become less common as Christian fundamentalism has increased.

== The tambaran culture ==
The male-dominated tambaran or tambaram culture uses the haus tambaran as a meeting-house and site for rituals and initiations. It is also used in worship for the yam cult, the yam being the staple food for the Sepik people. The women serve primarily as preparers of feasts, outsiders, and spectators. The giant spirit, called Nggwal or Ngwalndu among the Abelam and Southern Arapesh peoples, is personified as noises that can be heard coming from the haus tambaran. Nggwal is the primary ancestor deity, though other cultural heroes are also often depicted in cultural and sacred arts. Ngwalndu are large, flat painted faces that line the inside of the structure. Though they are said to be representations of ancestral spirits, they can also be seen as stylized women's bodies. However, painting is a sacred activity for the Sepik people, and the paintings of the Sepik people are taken very seriously.

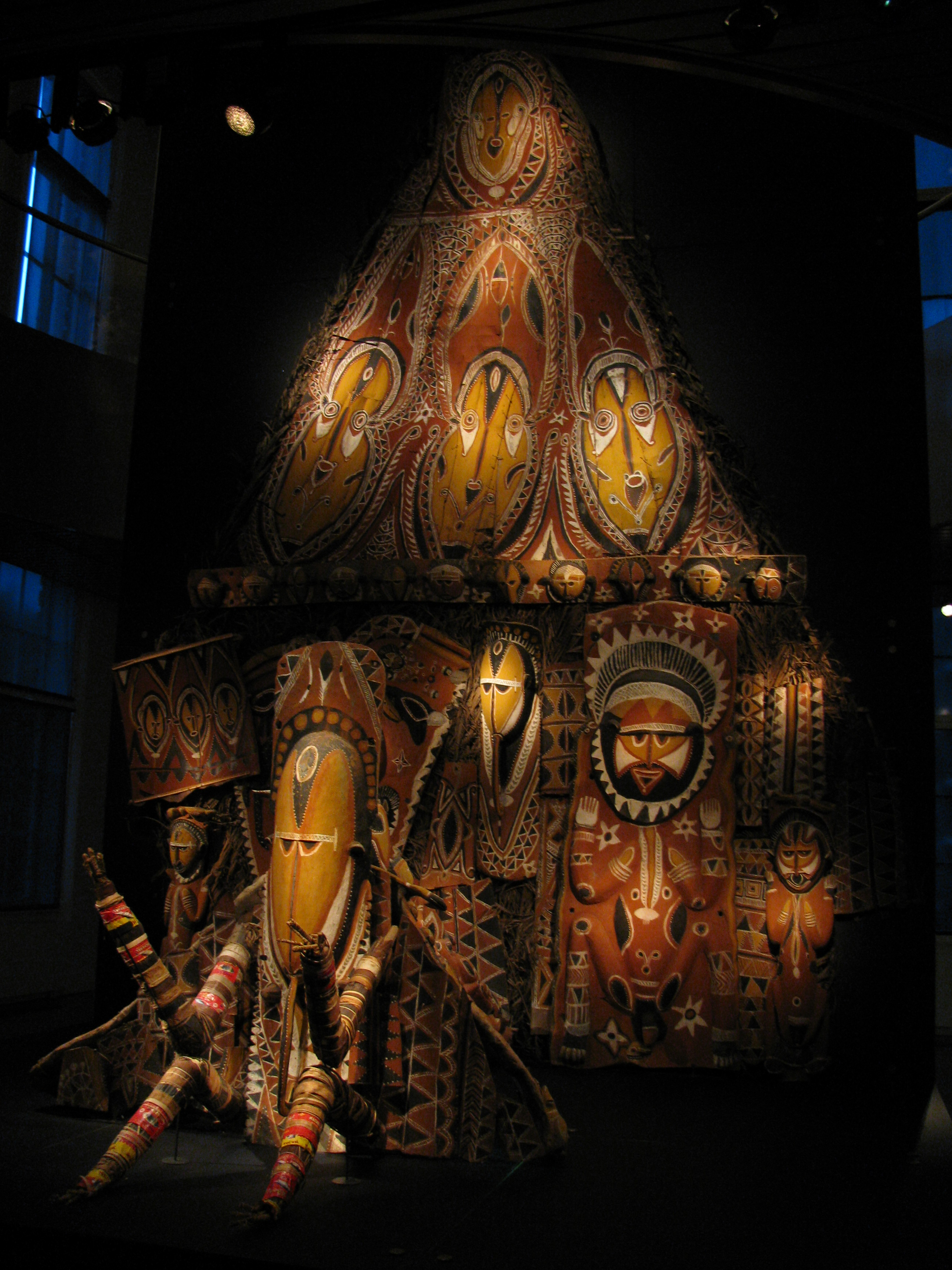
Haus Tambaran, Apangai, Maprik District, 1984, now in the National Museum of Ethnology, Leiden, Netherlands

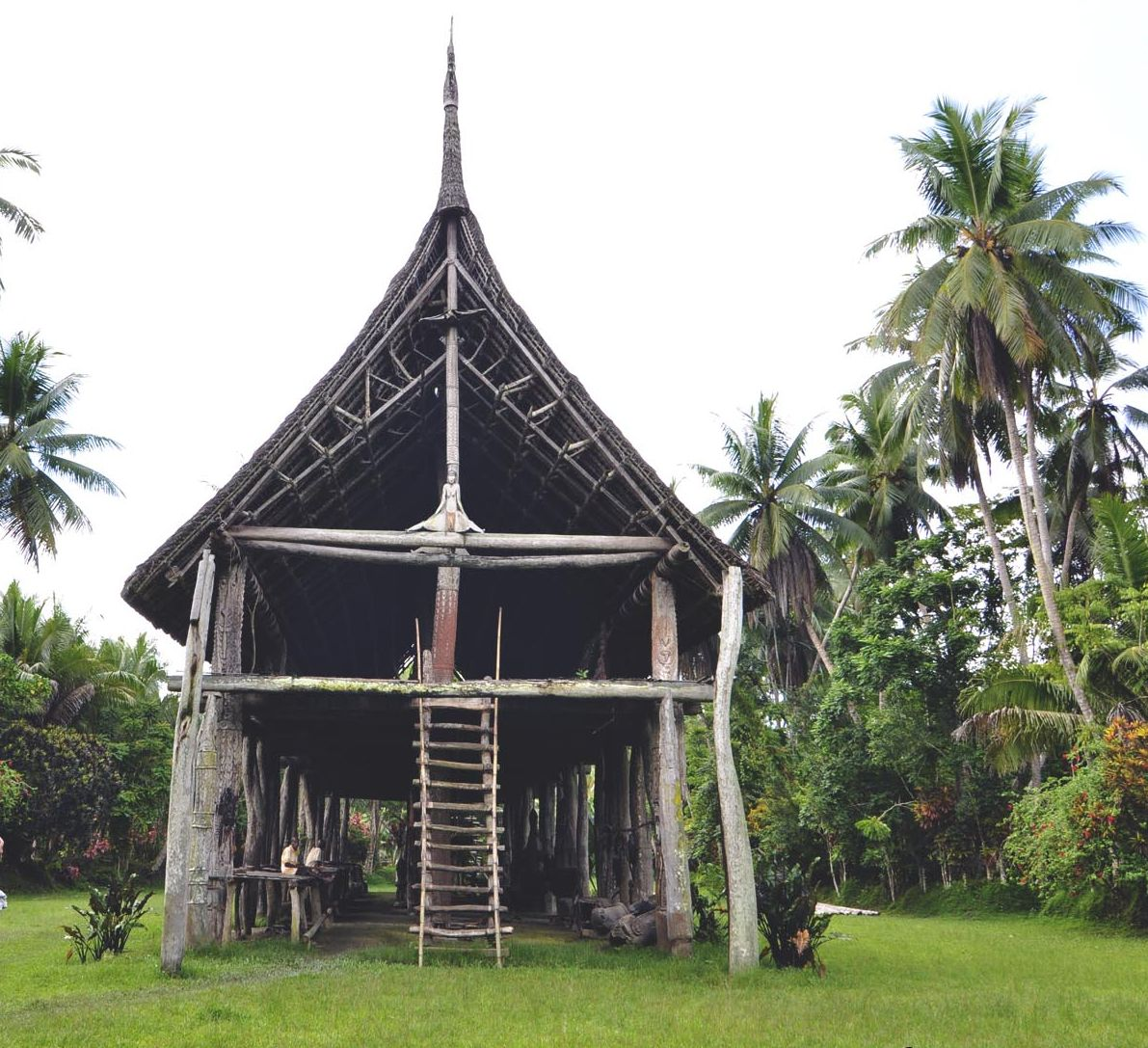
Haus Tambaran, Sepik, 2010

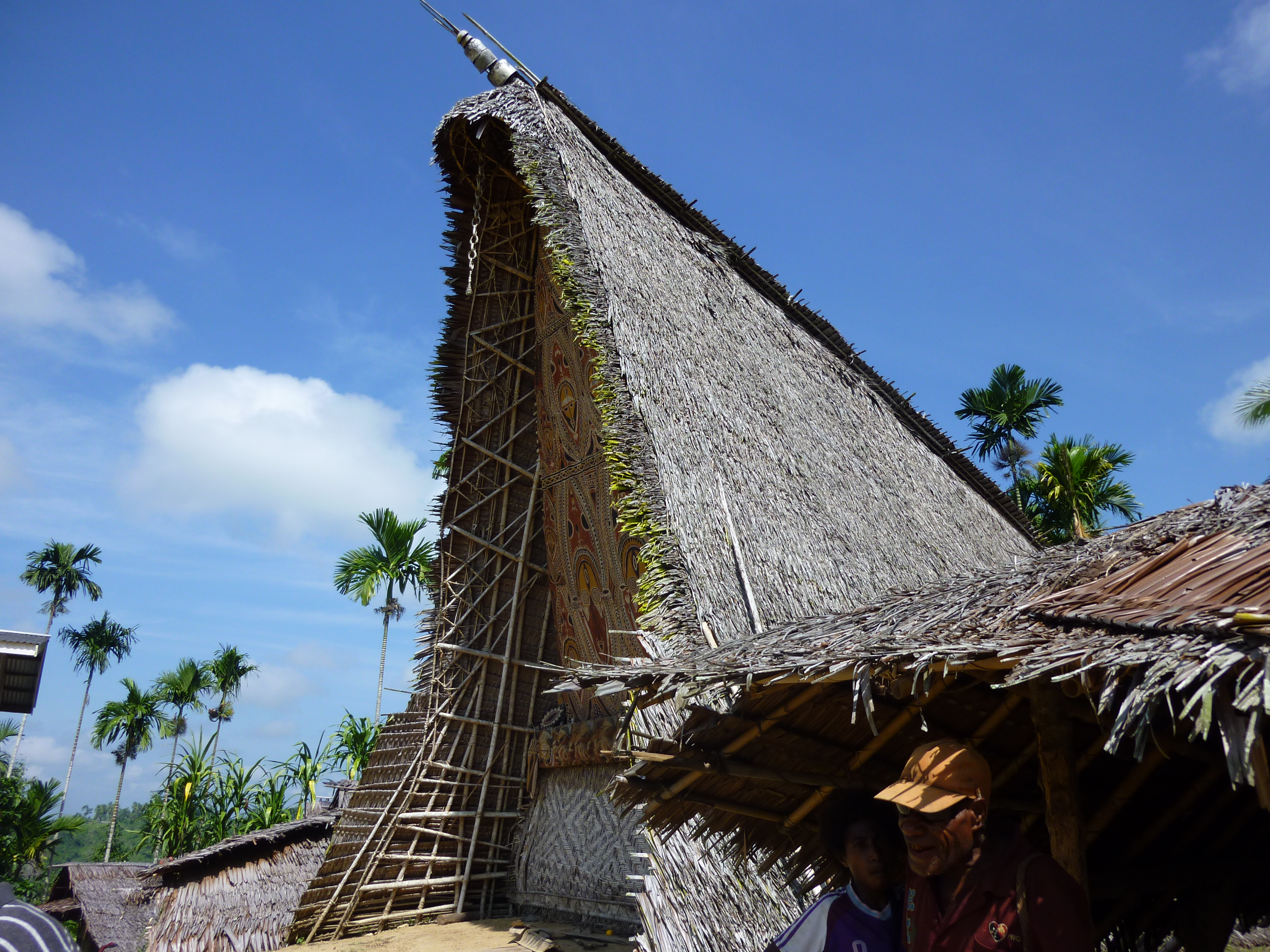
Haus Tambaran, Apangai, 2012

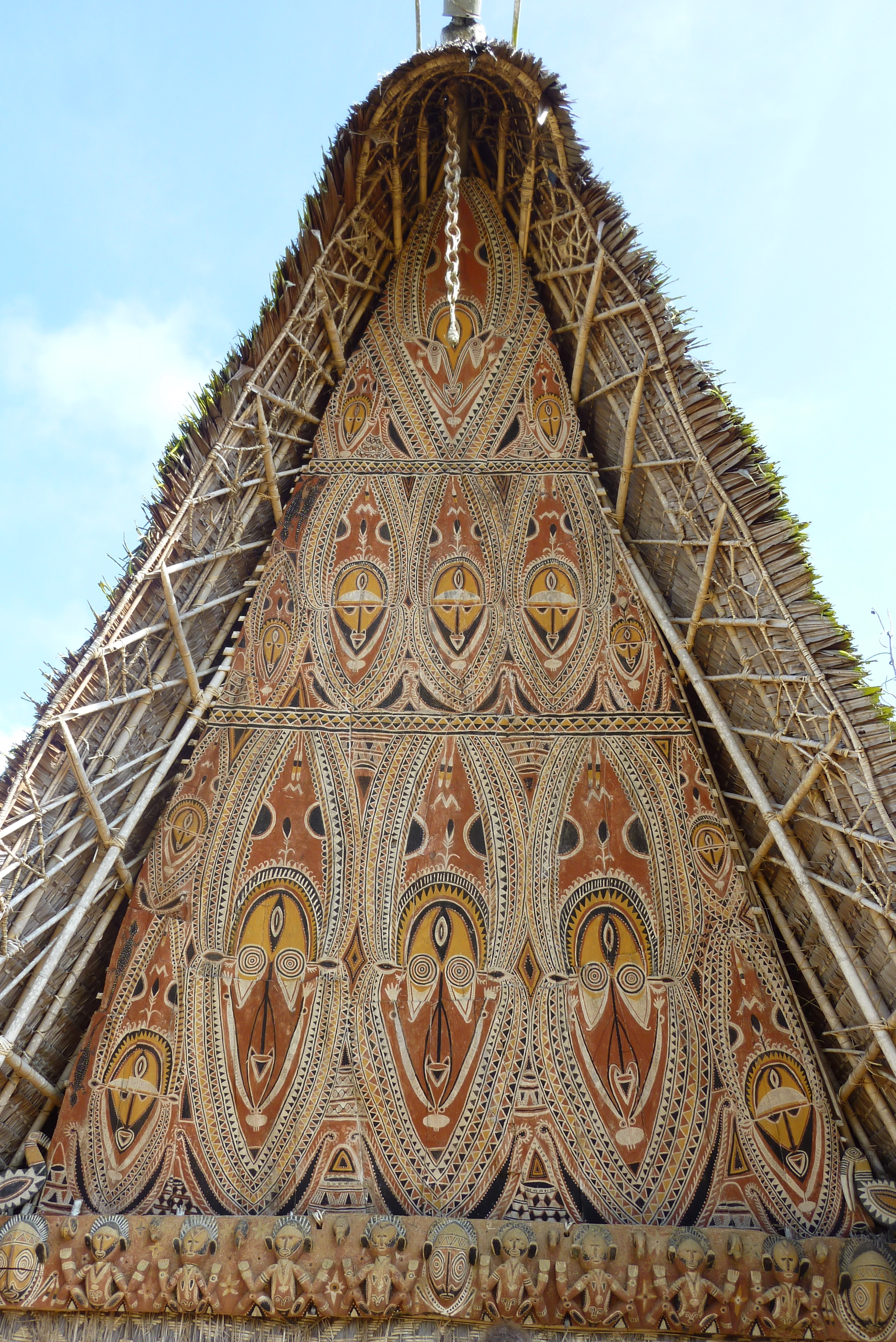
Gable of the Haus Tambaran, Apangai, 2012

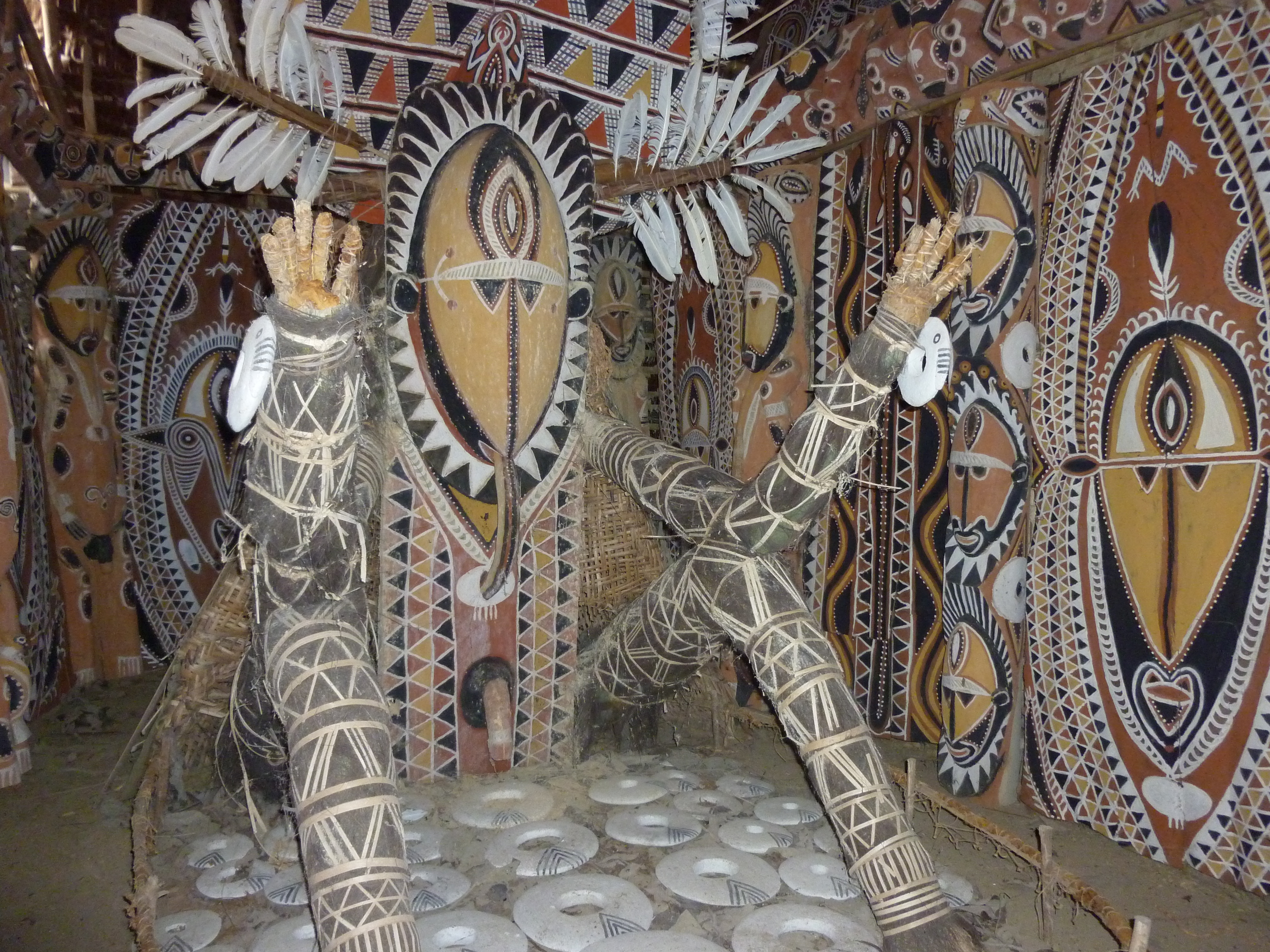
Haus Tambaran Apangai, inner space with Nggwal figure

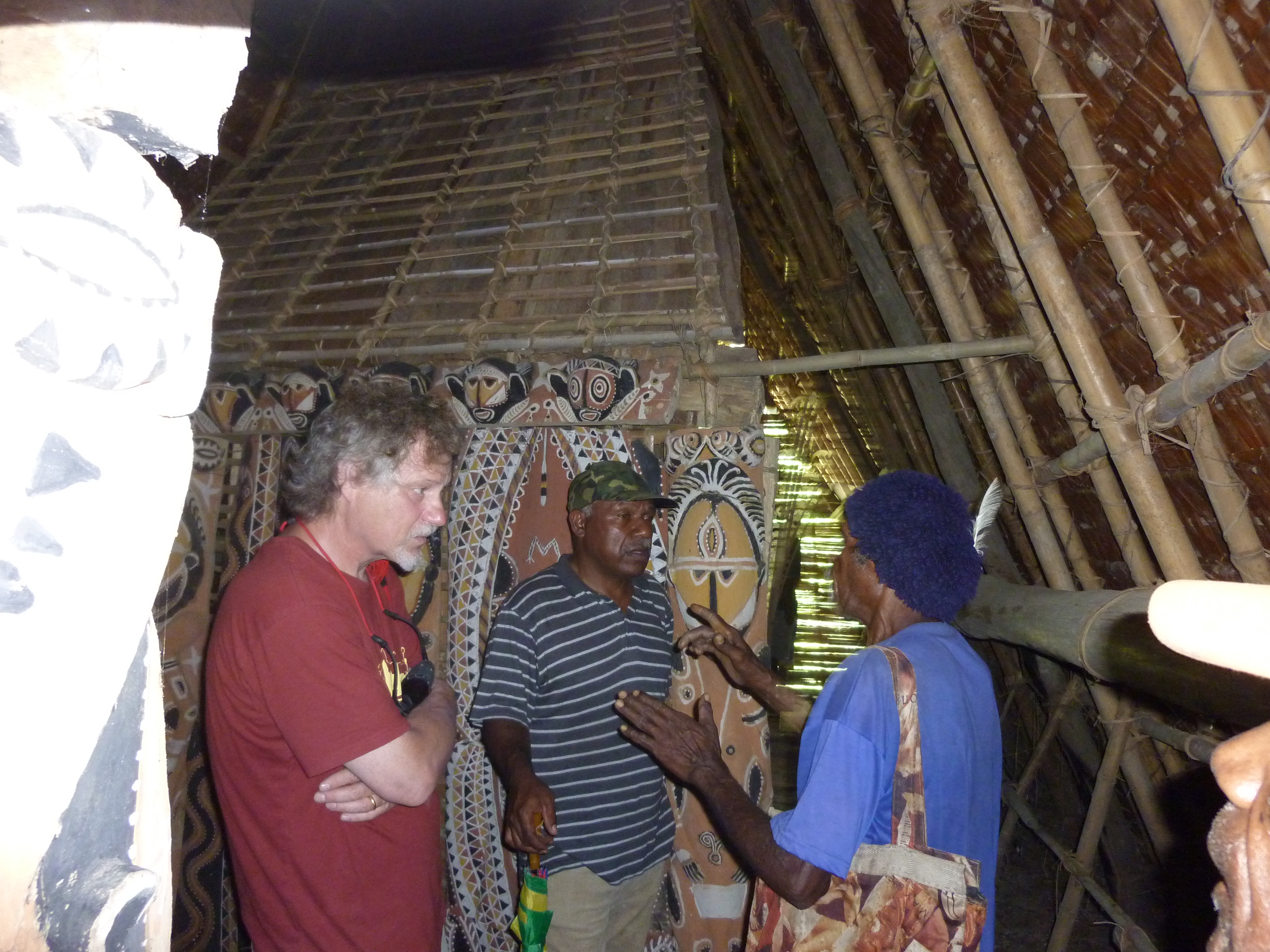
Ingo Kühl, Tomulopa Deko and indigenous men (from left to right) in the Haus Tambaran in Apangai, 2012

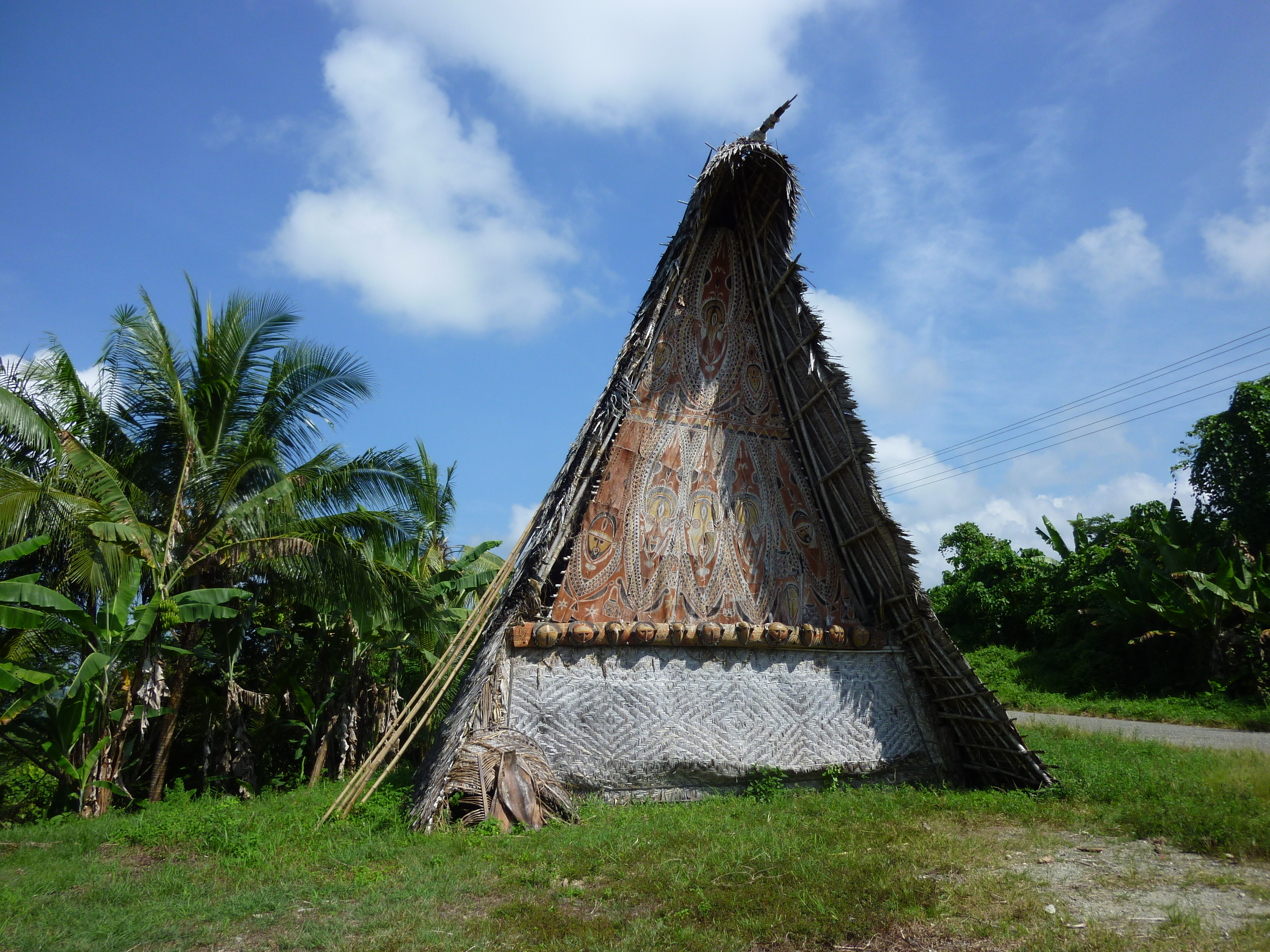
Haus Tambaran near Apangai, 2012

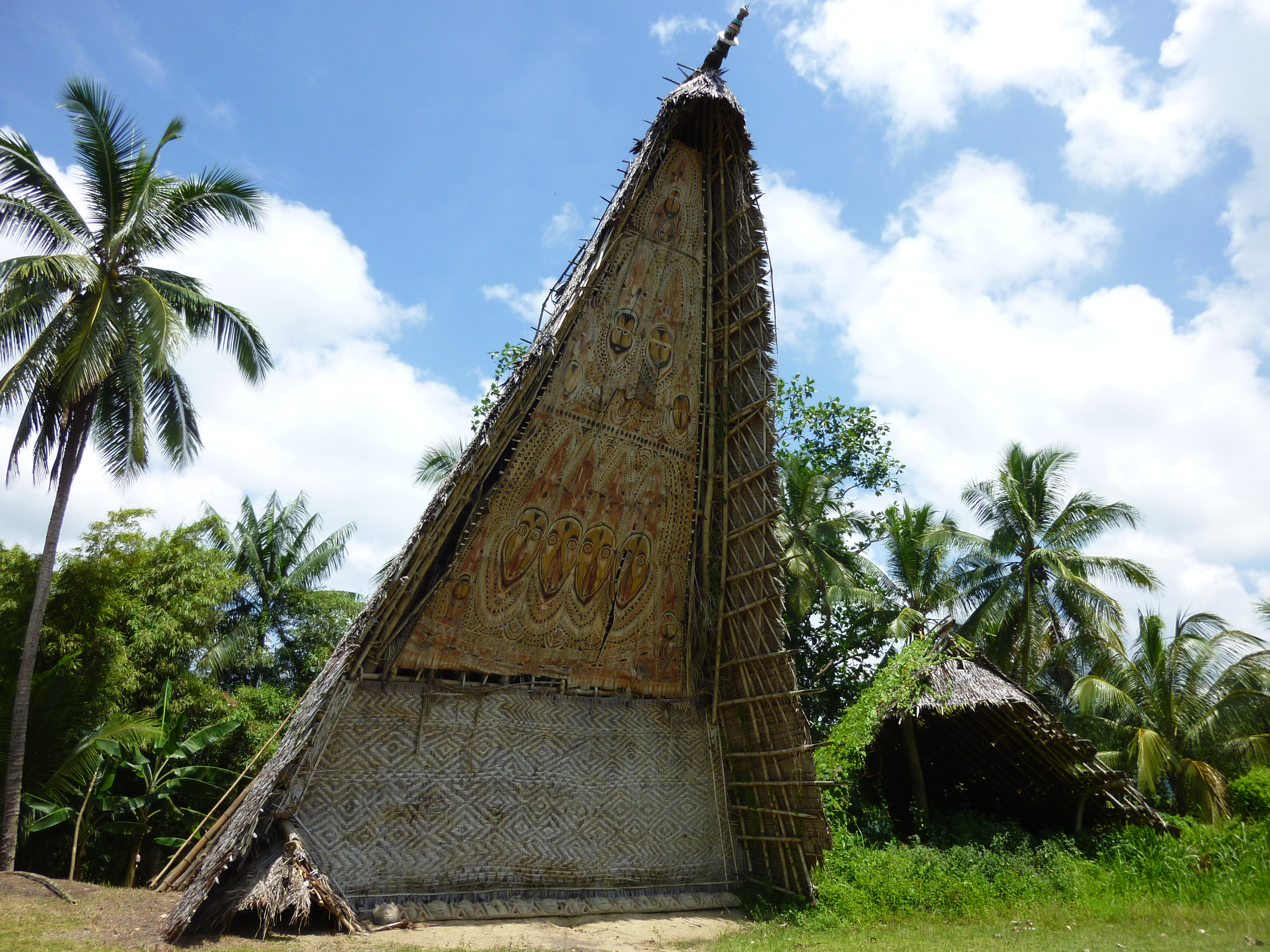
Haus Tambaran, Maprik District, 2012

== Bibliography ==
- René Gardi: Sepik. Land der sterbenden Geister, Zürich, 1958.
- Donald F. Tuzin: The Voice of the Tambaran: Truth and Illusion in Ilahita Arapesh Religion. University of California Press, 1980. ISBN 978-0-520-03964-3
- Philippe Peltier, Markus Schindlbeck, Christian Kaufmann (publisher): Tanz der Ahnen. Kunst vom Sepik in Papua-Neuguinea, catalog for the exhibitions of the same name in Berlin, Zürich und Paris, 2015/2016.
- Michael Hirschbichler: Mythische Konstruktionen. Kult- und Geisterhäuser Papua-Neuguineas, 2021. ISBN 978-3-8030-2109-0.
