= Lajos Zilahy =

Hungarian novelist and playwright

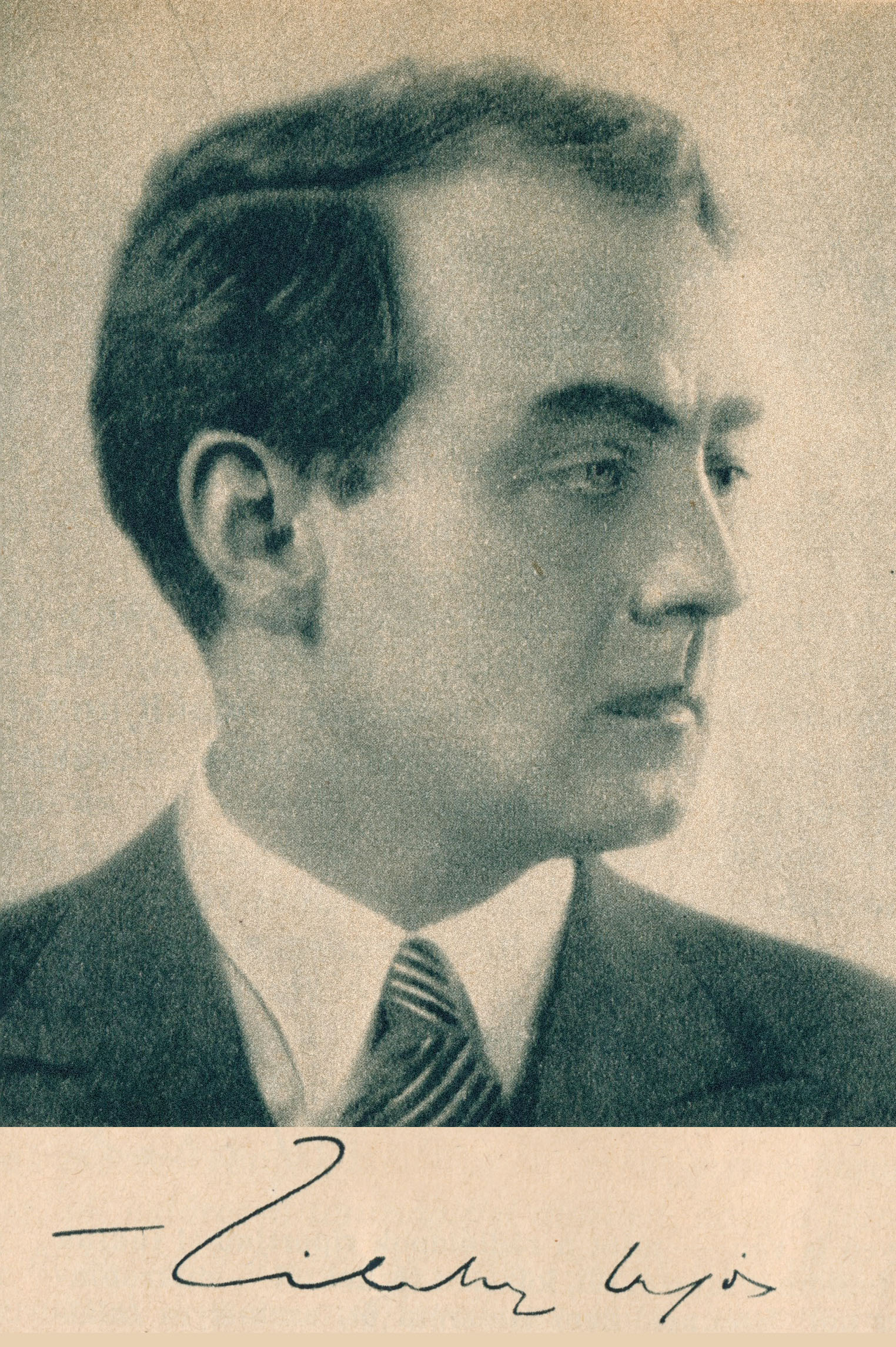
Zilahy in 1935

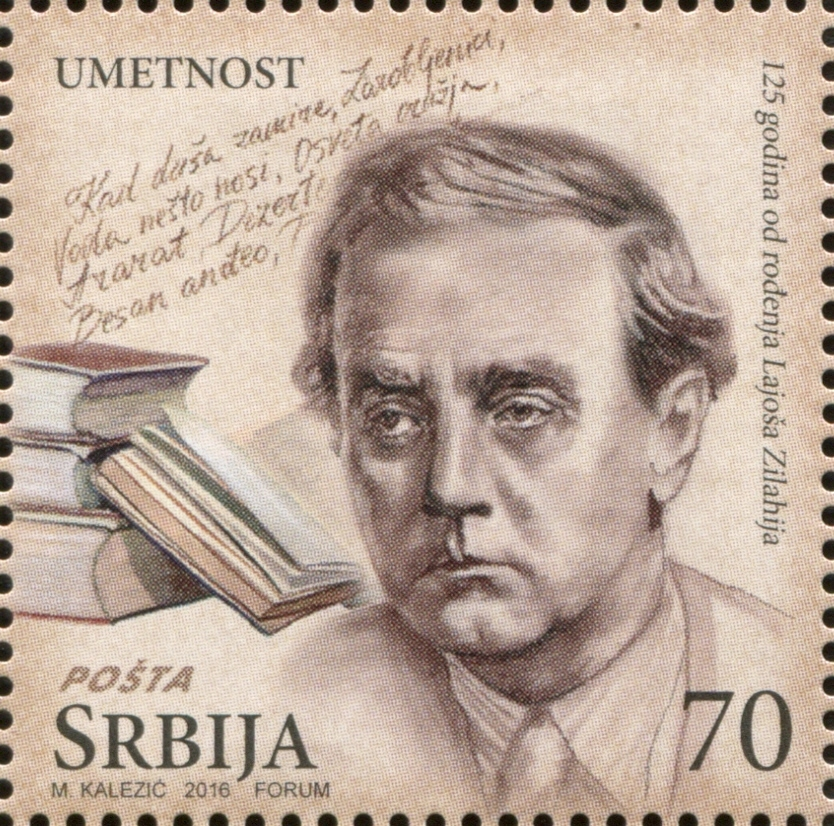
Zilahy on a 2017 Serbian stamp

Lajos Zilahy (27 March 1891 − 1 December 1974) was a Hungarian novelist and playwright. Born in Nagyszalonta, Austria-Hungary (now Salonta, Romania), he studied law at the University of Budapest before serving in the Austro-Hungarian army during the First World War, in which he was wounded on the Eastern Front – an experience which later informed his bestselling novel Two Prisoners (Két fogoly).

He was also active in film. His 1928 novel Something Is Drifting on the Water (Valamit visz a víz) was filmed twice. His play The General was filmed as The Virtuous Sin in 1930 and The Rebel in 1931.

Edited Híd (The Bridge) 1940–1944, an art periodical. Opposed both fascism and communism. In 1939, he established a film studio named Pegazus, which operated until the end of 1943. Pegazus produced motion pictures and Zilahy directed some of them. In 1944, his play Fatornyok (Wooden Towers) was banned. Gave all assets to government treasury in early 1940s for use in educating youth in world peace, which led to the establishment of Kitűnőek Iskolája.

He wrote the 1943 screenplay himself and co-directed it with Gusztáv Oláh in Hungary under the international English title Something Is in the Water. The Czechoslovak screenplay was written by Imre Gyöngyössy, Ján Kadár and Elmar Klos, and directed by the latter two with a Serbian, Slovak, Hungarian, Czech and American cast on location at the Danube in Slovakia under the title Desire Called Anada in Czech (Touha zvaná Anada, 1969) and Slovak (Túžba zvaná Anada), with Adrift as its English title.

Lajos Zilahy became the Secretary General of Hungarian PEN but his liberal views placed him at odds, first, with the right-wing Horthy regime and later with the post-war Communist government. Zilahy left Hungary in 1947, spending the rest of his life in exile in the US, where he completed A Dukay család, a trilogy of novels (Century in Scarlet, The Dukays, The Angry Angel) chronicling the history of a fictitious Hungarian aristocratic family from the Napoleonic era to the middle of the twentieth century. He died in Novi Sad, Serbia, then part of Yugoslavia.

Several of his novels have been translated into Bulgarian, Czech, Danish, Dutch, English, Estonian, Finnish, French, German, Italian, Japanese, Polish, Romanian, Serbo-Croatian, Slovak, Slovenian, Spanish (mainly), Swedish, and Turkish, and some of his plays into German, Italian, and Spanish. An edition of his short stories is available in Spanish and some of his short stories have been translated into Bulgarian, Croatian, English, Estonian, French, German, Hindi, Italian, Polish, Portuguese, Slovak, Spanish, and Swedish, and some of his poems into German.

== Selected novels ==
- Something Is Drifting on the Water (Valamit visz a víz) (1928)
- Two Prisoners (Két fogoly) (1931)
- The Deserter (1932)
- Az utolsó szerep (1935)
- A fegyverek visszanéznek (1936)
- The Dukays (Résmetszet alkonyat) (1949)
- The Angry Angel (A dühödt angyal) (1953)
- Century in Scarlet (Bíbor évszázad) (1965)

== Selected plays ==
- Hazajáró lélek (1923)
- Süt a nap (1924)
- Siberia (Szibéria) (1928)
- The General (A tábornok) (1928)
- Firebird (Tűzmadár) (1932)

== Filmography ==
- Rongyosok, directed by Béla Gaál (Silent film, 1926, based on a novel by Lajos Zilahy)
- The Virtuous Sin, directed by George Cukor and Louis J. Gasnier (1930, based on the play The General)
  - Generalen, directed by Gustaf Bergman (Swedish, 1931, based on the play The General)
  - The Rebel, directed by Adelqui Migliar (French, 1931, based on the play The General)
  - Die Nacht der Entscheidung, directed by Dimitri Buchowetzki (German, 1931, based on the play The General)
- Cette nuit-là, directed by Marc Sorkin and G. W. Pabst (French, 1933, based on the play The Firebird)
- The Firebird, directed by William Dieterle (1934, based on the play The Firebird)
- Két fogoly, directed by Steve Sekely (Hungarian, 1938, based on the novel Two Prisoners)
- Süt a nap, directed by László Kalmár (Hungarian, 1939, based on the play Süt a nap)
- Haunting Spirit, directed by Lajos Zilahy (Hungarian, 1940, based on the play Hazajáró lélek)
- Something in the Water, directed by Lajos Zilahy and Gusztáv Oláh (Hungarian, 1944, based on the novel Something Is Drifting on the Water)
- El pecado de una madre, directed by Ramón Pereda (Mexican, 1944, based on the play The Firebird)
- Her Final Role, directed by Jean Gourguet (French, 1946, based on the novel Az utolsó szerep)
- Algo flota sobre el agua, directed by Alfredo B. Crevenna (Mexican, 1948, based on the novel Something Is Drifting on the Water)
- The Golden Bridge, directed by Paul Verhoeven (German, 1956, based on the novel A fegyverek visszanéznek)
- The Open Door, directed by César Fernández Ardavín (Spanish, 1957, based on the play The Firebird)
- Adrift, directed by Elmar Klos and Ján Kadár (Czech, 1969/71, based on the novel Something Is Drifting on the Water)

=== Screenwriter ===
- A Girl Sets Out (dir. Steve Sekely, 1937)
- Szívet szívért (dir. Steve Sekely, 1937)
- Two Prisoners (dir. Steve Sekely, 1938)
- Deadly Spring (dir. László Kalmár, 1939)
- A szüz és a gödölye (dir. Lajos Zilahy, 1941)

=== Director ===
- Haunting Spirit (1940)
- A szüz és a gödölye (1941)
- Valamit visz a víz (1944)
