= A Bowl of Lentils =

1941 film

- Directed by: Zoltán Farkas
- Written by: Lajos Nagy; Jenő Tersánszky Józsi
- Produced by: Lajos Kozma
- Starring: Katalin Karády; Pál Jávor; Gyula Csortos
- Cinematography: István Eiben
- Edited by: Zoltán Farkas
- Music by: Tibor Polgár
- Production company: Pegazus Film
- Release date: 1941
- Running time: 93 minutes
- Country: Hungary
- Language: Hungarian

A Bowl of Lentils (Hungarian: Egy tál lencse) is a 1941 Hungarian musical comedy film directed by Zoltán Farkas and starring Katalin Karády, Pál Jávor and Gyula Csortos. It was shot at the Hunnia Studios in Budapest. The film's sets were designed by the art director Imre Sőrés.

== Synopsis ==
Margit, a young woman from Budapest, manages to get a job on a rabbit farm under false pretences, using the papers of her friend Irma. She is unaware that Irma is a distant relative of the elder owner, who plans to make her his heir.

== Cast ==
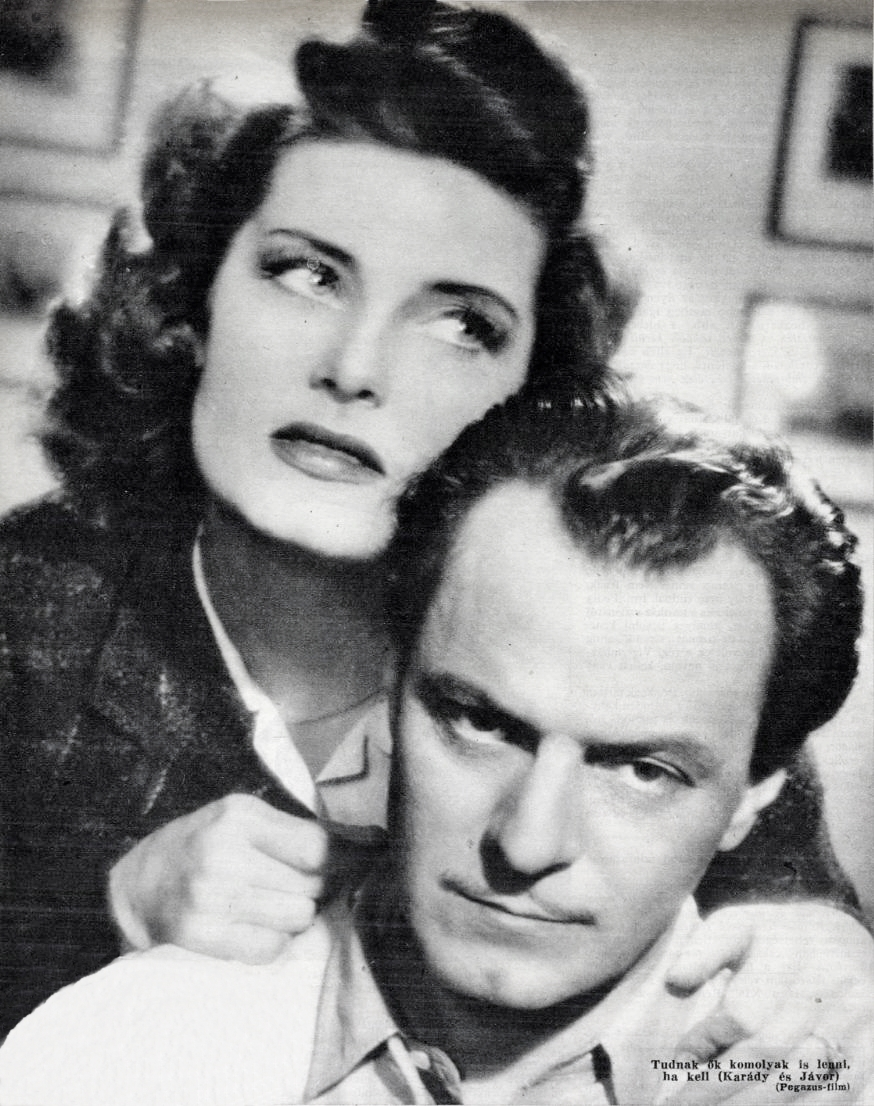
Karády and Jávor.

- Katalin Karády as Horváth Margit
- Pál Jávor as Rudasi Sándor, Land Steward
- Gyula Csortos as Kagits György Lordship
- Manyi Kiss as Papp Irma
- Piri Peéry as wife of Land Agent
- Zoltán Makláry as new Self-proclaimed relative
- Ilona Kökény as Self-proclaimed relative
- József Juhász as Pali, Son of Land Agent
- Oszkár Maleczky as Self-proclaimed relative
- Sándor Pethes as Footman
- Marcsa Simon as Housekeeper of Rudasi Sándor
- Ilona Bánhidy as Self-proclaimed realvite of Kagits
- Lajos Sugár as Land Agent
- Magdolna Féja as Honeytrap at Rudas
- Gusztáv Vándory as Doctor
- Teri Járay as Angora rabbit farm hand
- Sándor Solymossy as Zsiga, Self-proclaimed relative of Kagits
- Erzsébet Medgyesy as Self-proclaimed relative of Kagits
- Emmi Nagy as Buffet attendant
- Éva Serényi as Maid
- Sándor Hidassy
- Lajos Köpeczi Boócz
- Gerő Mály Self-proclaimed relative of Kagits
- Ferenc Pataki

== Bibliography ==
- Juhász, István. Kincses magyar filmtár 1931-1944: az eredeti forgatókönyvből 1931 és 1944 között létrejött hazai mozgóképekről. Kráter, 2007.
- Rîpeanu, Bujor. (ed.) International Directory of Cinematographers, Set- and Costume Designers in Film: Hungary (from the beginnings to 1988). Saur, 1981.
