= Dasque =

Dasque is a surname. Notable people with the surname include:

- Jean Dasque (1919–2013), French film director
- Juan Carlos Dasque (born 1952), Argentine sport shooter
