= Rongyosok =

1926 film

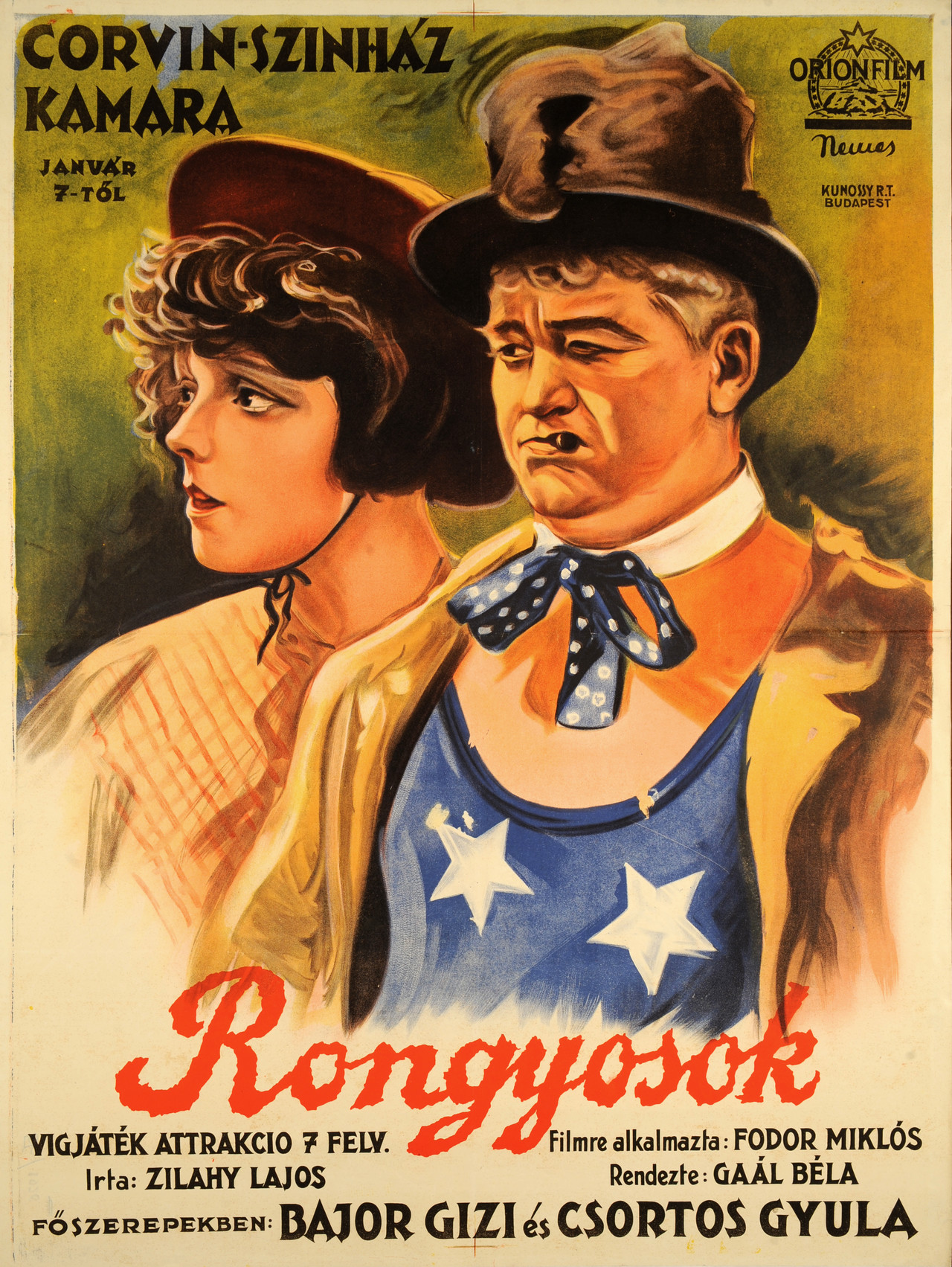
- Directed by: Béla Gaál
- Written by: Lajos Zilahy (novel); Miklós Fodor
- Produced by: Miklós Fodor
- Starring: Gizi Bajor; Gyula Csortos; József Kürthy
- Cinematography: János Vanicsek
- Production company: Orion Filmgyár
- Release date: 7 January 1926
- Country: Hungary
- Language: Hungarian

Rongyosok is a 1926 Hungarian silent film directed by Béla Gaál and starring Gizi Bajor, Gyula Csortos and József Kürthy. The film's sets were designed by the art director István Básthy.

== Cast ==
- Gizi Bajor as Tili, Vili lánya
- Gyula Csortos as Vili, vándorkomédiás
- József Kürthy as Varju András földbirtokos
- Marianne Abonyi as Varju Zsófika
- Sándor Pethes as Laboda Lajos
- Erzsébet Gyöngyössy as Varju Andrásné
- István Dózsa as Varju Bandi
- Peggy Norman
- Endre Szeghõ
- Sándor Fülöp
- Gyula Stella
- Géza Boross
- Gusztáv Vándory

== Bibliography ==
- Rîpeanu, Bujor. (ed.) International Directory of Cinematographers, Set- and Costume Designers in Film: Hungary (from the beginnings to 1988). Saur, 1981.
- Vilmos, Várkonyi. Jávor Pál: és a magyar film aranykora. Zima Szabolcs, 2013
