= Sándor Szabó (actor) =

Hungarian actor

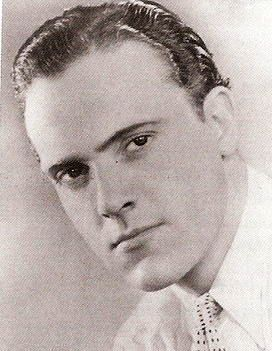
- Born: 25 April 1915; Budapest, Austria-Hungary
- Died: 12 November 1997 (aged 82); Budapest, Hungary
- Occupation: Actor
- Years active: 1935–1997
- Spouse(s): Kató Bárczy; Violetta Ferrari

Sándor Szabó (25 April 1915 – 12 November 1997) was a Hungarian actor. He appeared in 80 films and television shows between 1935 and 1997.

== Selected filmography ==
- Once in a Blue Moon (1935) - Ivan
- Princess of the Puszta (1939) - John MacPercy
- Money Talks (1940) - Dárday István
- Don't Ask Who I Was (1941) - Ákos, Son of Mrs. Mohai
- Mission to Moscow (1943) - Ski Troop Lieutenant (uncredited)
- Happy Times (1943) - Márton
- Knock on the Window (1944)
- Passage to Marseille (1944) - Sergeant of the Guards (uncredited)
- Machita (1944) - Kovács Gábor, engineer
- After the Storm (1945) - Bordás Géza
- Tüz (1948) - Police officer of economical affair
- Hot Fields (1949) - chief constable
- Janika (1949) - Balla János
- A Strange Marriage (1951) - Vicar Szucsinka
- Déryné (1951) - Déry István
- Dreamboat (1952) - Giant Arab (uncredited)
- Erkel (1952) - Petrichevich Horváth Lázár
- Föltámadott a tenger (1953) - Molnár Ferdinánd
- A város alatt (1953) - Zilahi
- 2x2 néha 5 (1954) - Bálint
- Rakoczy's Lieutenant (1954) - General count Starhemberg Maximilan
- Életjel (1955) - Deák
- Hell's Island (1955) - Johann Torbig
- The Bridge of Life (1956) - Jánosi, chief engineer
- Az eltüsszentett birodalom (1956) - Commander
- Egy magyar nábob (1966)
- Mission: Impossible: Nitro (1969) - Ismir Najiid
- Topaz (1969) - Emile Redon
- Bluebeard (1972) - The doctor
- A Strange Role (1976) - Doctor Wallach
- Fekete gyémántok (1976) - Abbot Sámuel
- 80 huszár (1978) - General Leopold Krüger
- Hungarians (1978) - German peasant
- Legato (1978) - Galkó Ervin
- Nem élhetek muzsikaszó nélkül (1978) - Uncle Lajos
- Die kleine Figur meines Vaters (1980) - Editor-in-chief
- The Heiresses (1980) - Komáromi
- Ki beszél itt szerelemről? (1980) - Dr. Csollány Tibor
- The Man Who Went Up in Smoke (1980) - Mr. Sós
- Temné slunce (1981) - James
- The Little Fox (1981) - Vahúr (voice)
- Maria's Day (1984) - Szendrey Ignác
- Lily in Love (1984) - Teodor
- Az élet muzsikája - Kálmán Imre (1984) - Father of Kálmán Imre
- Küldetés Evianba (1988) - Envoy of U.S.A.
- Meeting Venus (1991) - 1st Violinist M. Leuchter
- Prinzenbad (1993) - Schlee
- A gólyák mindig visszatérnek (1993) - Grandfather
