= The Open Door (1957 film) =

La puerta abierta
- Film poster
- Directed by: César Fernández Ardavín
- Written by: César Fernández Ardavín; Nino Miñuto; Ákos Tolnay; Bruno Valeri
- Based on: the play Tűzmadár by Lajos Zilahy
- Produced by: Giancarlo Cappelli
- Cinematography: Enzo Serafin
- Edited by: Giancarlo Cappelli
- Music by: Carlo Innocenzi; Emilio Ruiz Lehmberg
- Production companies: Hesperia Films S.A. Mercurfilm
- Distributed by: Mercurio Films S.A.
- Release date: 1957
- Running time: 103 minutes
- Country: Spain
- Language: Spanish

The Open Door (La puerta abierta) is a prize-winning 1957 Spanish film based on the 1932 play Tűzmadár by Lajos Zilahy. It was directed by César Fernández Ardavín and stars Amedeo Nazzari and Märta Torén.

== Synopsis ==
Shortly after settling in Madrid, the body of a murdered dancer appears. His Don Juan condition, in addition to his vanity, make the police suspect that it is a crime of passion. As the investigation continues, the doubts and jealousy of one of his neighbors threaten to damage his family life.

== Cast ==
- Amedeo Nazzari as Michel de Caroli
- Märta Torén as Countess de Caroli
- Rafael de Córdoba as Alomar
- Nadia Marlowa as Marietta
- Carlos Casaravilla as Police commissioner
- Carlos Larrañaga as Pedro
- Aurora de Alba as Yolanda
- Teresa del Río
- Salvador Soler Marí
- Manuel Arbó
- Aníbal Vela
- Vicente Ávila
- Francisco Sánchez
- María del Pilar Armesto
- Julia Pachelo
- Nora Samsó
- José Prada

== See also ==
- Cette nuit-là (1933), French film based on the play Tűzmadár
- The Firebird (1934), American film based on the play Tűzmadár
