= Andor Ajtay =

Hungarian actor

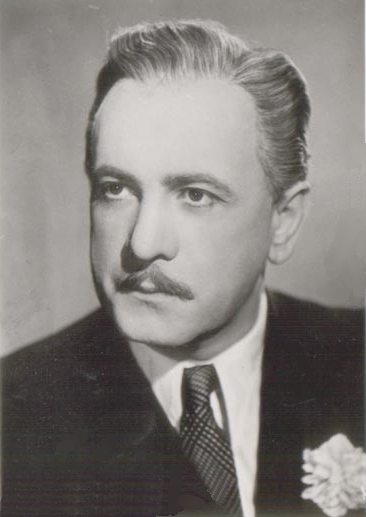
- Andor Ajtay (1942)
- Born: Ajtay Kovács Andor; 25 July 1903; Fogaras, Austria-Hungary
- Died: 9 May 1975 (aged 71); Budapest, Hungary
- Occupation: Film actor
- Years active: 1937–1971

Andor Ajtay (1903–1975) was a Hungarian Kossuth Prize-winning (1954) actor.

== Selected filmography ==
- Lady Seeks a Room (1937)
- I Defended a Woman (1938)
- Two Girls on the Street (1939)
- Unknown Opponent (1940)
- Silent Monastery (1941)
- Lóránd Fráter (1942)
- Male Fidelity (1942)
- Costume Ball (1942)
- At the Crossroads (1942)
- Happy Times (1943)
- The Night Girl (1943)
- Orient Express (1943)
- The Siege of Beszterce (1948)
- The Marriage of Katalin Kis (1950)
- Underground Colony (1951)
- Erkel (1952)
- A Strange Mask of Identity (1955)
- Ward 9 (1955)
- Two Wishes (1957)
- Danse Macabre (1958)
- Cantata (1963)
- The Man Who Doesn't Exist (1964)
- Imposztorok (1969)
