= Don't Ask Who I Was =

1941 film

- Directed by: Béla Balogh
- Written by: Béla Balogh; Mária Szepes
- Produced by: Lajos Güttler
- Starring: Katalin Karády; Sándor Szabó; Mariska Vízváry
- Cinematography: Árpád Makay
- Edited by: Péter Pokol
- Music by: Viktor Papir
- Production company: Balogh Film
- Release date: 22 August 1941
- Running time: 102 minutes
- Country: Hungary
- Language: Hungarian

Don't Ask Who I Was (Hungarian: Ne kérdezd ki voltam) is a 1941 Hungarian drama film directed by Béla Balogh and starring Katalin Karády, Sándor Szabó and Mariska Vízváry. It was shot at the Hunnia Studios in Budapest. The film's sets were designed by the art director Imre Sőrés.

== Cast ==
- Katalin Karády as Konrád Eszter
- László Baksa Soós as Kazár György, író
- Mariska Vízváry as Özvegy Kaszás Istvánné
- József Juhász as Ifj. Kaszás István, textilkereskedõ
- Vera Sennyei as Alice, Csángó felesége
- Lajos Vértes as Csángó Péter, szállodatulajdonos
- Romola Németh as Marion, Ákos menyasszonya
- Sándor Szabó as Ákos, Mohainé fia
- Katalin Ilosvay as Berend Nelly
- Gyula Benkö as Rudi, bárzongorista
- Nusi Somogyi as Juliska, szobaasszony
- Karola Zala as Özvegy Mohainé.
- Irén Sitkey as Berend felesége
- József Miskey as Berend Árpád, Nelly apja
- György Nagyajtay as Karcsi, Berend fia
- Géza Berczy as Szalontulajdonos
- György Solthy a sOlgyai Ferenc, gyáros
- Ilona Mester as Julis, Cseléd
- Gyula Szöreghy as Illatszerboltos
- Gertrúd Romváry as Kati, szállodai szobalány

== Bibliography ==
- Juhász, István. Kincses magyar filmtár 1931-1944: az eredeti forgatókönyvből 1931 és 1944 között létrejött hazai mozgóképekről. Kráter, 2007.
- Rîpeanu, Bujor. (ed.) International Directory of Cinematographers, Set- and Costume Designers in Film: Hungary (from the beginnings to 1988). Saur, 1981.
- Taylor, Richard (ed.) The BFI companion to Eastern European and Russian cinema. British Film Institute, 2000.
