= Costume Ball (film) =

1942 film

- Directed by: Endre Rodríguez
- Written by: Jenõ Szatmári; Zoltán Szitnyai
- Produced by: Géza Lipótné Zichy
- Starring: Éva Szörényi; Ida Turay; Andor Ajtay
- Cinematography: Károly Vass
- Edited by: Mária Vály
- Music by: Ottó Vincze
- Production company: Mûvelõdés Film
- Release date: 5 August 1942
- Running time: 91 minutes
- Country: Hungary
- Language: Hungarian

Costume Ball (Hungarian: Jelmezbál) is a 1942 Hungarian crime film directed by Endre Rodríguez and starring Éva Szörényi, Ida Turay and Andor Ajtay. The film's sets were designed by the art director János Pagonyi.

== Cast ==
- Éva Szörényi as Erzsébet, Agáth felesége
- Ida Turay as Tibér Klára
- Andor Ajtay as Agáth, orvosprofesszor
- Zoltán Greguss as Széky, festõmûvész
- Tivadar Bilicsi as Borbás
- Béla Mihályffi as Klári apja
- Béla Fáy as Condylis
- Elek Bognár as Adjunktus
- Emmi Nagy as Agáthék szobalánya
- Miklós Pataki as Detektív
- Erzsike Hajdu as Marika, beteg kislány
- György Nagyajtay as Orvos

== Bibliography ==
- Frey, David. Jews, Nazis and the Cinema of Hungary: The Tragedy of Success, 1929-1944. Bloomsbury Publishing, 2017.
- Juhász, István. Kincses magyar filmtár 1931-1944: az eredeti forgatókönyvből 1931 és 1944 között létrejött hazai mozgóképekről. Kráter, 2007.
- Rîpeanu, Bujor. (ed.) International Directory of Cinematographers, Set- and Costume Designers in Film: Hungary (from the beginnings to 1988). Saur, 1981.
