= The Frozen Child =

1921 film

- Original title: A Megfagyott gyermek
- Directed by: Béla Balogh
- Written by: József Eötvös (story); Ede Sas
- Starring: Mária Szepes; Ferenc Szécsi; Viktor Galánthay; Anna Breznay
- Cinematography: Miksa Ádler
- Production company: Star Filmgyár
- Release date: 1 September 1921
- Country: Hungary
- Languages: Silent; Hungarian intertitles

The Frozen Child (Hungarian: A Megfagyott gyermek) is a 1921 Hungarian silent drama film directed by Béla Balogh and starring Mária Szepes, Ferenc Szécsi, Anna Breznay and Viktor Galánthay. It is one of the few surviving Hungarian films of the early 1920s. It was unusual for its depiction of poverty in Hungary at a time when this was discouraged or censored by the authorities.

== Cast ==
- Mária Szepes as Terike
- Ferenc Szécsi as Lacika
- Anna Breznay as Házmesterné
- Mór Ditrói as Pap
- Viktor Galánthay as Nagy Jóska
- Rezsö Inke as Barabás, Terike apja
- Ilona Linke as Kovácsné, Lacika anyja
- Imre Pintér as Vincze bácsi

== Bibliography ==
- Cunningham, John. Hungarian Cinema: From Coffee House to Multiplex. Wallflower Press, 2004.
