= Adventure in Gerolstein =

1957 film

- Directed by: Zoltán Farkas
- Written by: Andor Kolozsvári; György Szinetár
- Produced by: József Gyõrffy
- Starring: Erzsébet Házy; Iván Darvas; Manyi Kiss
- Cinematography: István Hildebrand
- Edited by: László Nagy
- Music by: Iván Patachich
- Production company: Budapest Filmstúdió
- Release date: 5 September 1957
- Running time: 100 minutes
- Country: Hungary
- Language: Hungarian

Adventure in Gerolstein (Hungarian: Gerolsteini kaland) is a 1957 Hungarian comedy film directed by Zoltán Farkas and starring Erzsébet Házy, Iván Darvas and Manyi Kiss. The film was shot at the Hunnia Studios in the capital Budapest with sets designed by the art director Tivadar Bertalan. It was one of the most popular films in Hungary during the decade, drawing audiences of over three and a half million.

== Cast ==
- Erzsébet Házy as Antónia Grand Duchess
- Iván Darvas as Martin Grand Duke
- Manyi Kiss as Klotild
- Kamill Feleki as Bumm Alfonz Chancellor
- József Timár as Al'Paca
- Mária Lázár as Anasztázia
- Ernö Szabó as Árgus Chief Constable
- Gyula Gózon as Federik Innkeeper
- Mari Szemes as Olivia
- Hédi Váradi as Marie
- Zoltán Basilides as Conspirator
- Tibor Benedek as Guest
- György Bárdy as Gatekeeper
- Dezsö Garas as Ágens

== Bibliography ==
- Cunningham, John. Hungarian Cinema: From Coffee House to Multiplex. Wallflower Press, 2004.
- Ostrowska, Dorota, Pitassio, Francesco & Varga, Zsuzsanna. Popular Cinemas in East Central Europe: Film Cultures and Histories. Bloomsbury Publishing, 2017.
