= Unknown Opponent =

1940 film

- Directed by: Endre Rodríguez
- Written by: Géza Csörögi
- Produced by: János Bingert; Mihály Vörösmarty
- Starring: Erzsi Simor; Andor Ajtay; Karola Zala
- Cinematography: Árpád Makay
- Edited by: László Katonka
- Music by: Béla Dolecskó
- Production company: Palatinus Filmterjesztõ Vállalat
- Release date: 5 December 1940
- Running time: 80 minutes
- Country: Hungary
- Language: Hungarian

Unknown Opponent (Hungarian: Ismeretlen ellenfél) is a 1940 Hungarian spy thriller film directed by Endre Rodríguez and starring Erzsi Simor, Andor Ajtay and Karola Zala. It was shot at the Hunnia Studios in Budapest. The film's sets were designed by the art director Miklós Velits.

== Synopsis ==
A foreign power interested in a new Hungarian prototype aircraft recruit Adrienne to steal the plans, but she falls for László the engineer behind the new design.

== Cast ==
- Erzsi Simor as Adrienne
- Andor Ajtay as Marton László
- Karola Zala as Id. Martonné
- László Földényi as Bratt, kémfõnök
- Nusi Somogyi as Bözsi
- Zoltán Greguss as A 127-es kém
- Éva Adorján as Titkárnõ
- Béla Mihályffi as A kémelhárítás vezetõje
- Sári Barabás as énekesnõ
- Lajos Kelemen as Bendzsós
- Ferenc Pethes as Munkavezetõ
- Tihamér Lázár as Rendõrfõnök
- Anni Eisen as Méltóságos asszony a bárban
- Dóra Fáy Kiss as Bárhölgy
- Béla Fáy as Alezredes
- Ottó Jeney as Kovács, Bratt sofõrje
- Árpád Latabár as Tóbiás - üzletvezetõ
- Zoltán Pethö as Kémfõnök
- Sándor Tompa as Rendõr

== Bibliography ==
- Juhász, István. Kincses magyar filmtár 1931–1944: az eredeti forgatókönyvből 1931 és 1944 között létrejött hazai mozgóképekről. Kráter, 2007.
- Rîpeanu, Bujor. (ed.) International Directory of Cinematographers, Set- and Costume Designers in Film: Hungary (from the beginnings to 1988). Saur, 1981.
