= The Firebird (1934 film) =

1934 film

- Directed by: William Dieterle
- Screenplay by: Charles Kenyon; Jeffrey Dell (adaptation)
- Based on: Tűzmadár; 1932 play by Lajos Zilahy
- Produced by: Gilbert Miller
- Starring: Verree Teasdale; Ricardo Cortez; Lionel Atwill; Anita Louise
- Cinematography: Ernest Haller
- Edited by: Ralph Dawson
- Music by: Leo F. Forbstein
- Production company: Warner Bros. Pictures
- Distributed by: Warner Bros. Pictures; The Vitaphone Corporation
- Release date: November 3, 1934
- Running time: 74-75 minutes
- Country: United States
- Language: English

The Firebird is a 1934 American murder mystery film starring Verree Teasdale, Ricardo Cortez, Lionel Atwill, and Anita Louise. It is directed by William Dieterle and produced and released by Warner Bros. Pictures. It is based on the 1932 play by Lajos Zelahy. The Firebird suite by Igor Stravinsky is heard occasionally during the film.

== Plot ==
In Vienna, smarmy matinee idol Brandt moves into an upscale apartment building whose principal tenants are the elite Pointer family: John, Carola and daughter Mariette, who's just turned 18. One day, Brandt encounters Carola on the stairwell and insists she come up to his apartment that night, telling her if she doesn't, he'll tell her husband they had the affair anyway. Outraged, she files a formal complaint with the building's owners, demanding he be kicked out. But before that can happen, he is found dead from a gunshot wound. Naturally suspicion falls on a variety of suspects, most obviously John, and it's up to police inspector Miller to figure out which of them did it.

== Cast ==
- Verree Teasdale as Carola Pointer
- Ricardo Cortez as Herman Brandt
- Lionel Atwill as John Pointer
- Anita Louise as Mariette Pointer
- C. Aubrey Smith as Police Inspector Miller
- Dorothy Tree as Mrs. Jolan Brandt
- Helen Trenholme as Mlle. Josephine Mousquet
- Hobart Cavanaugh as Emile
- Robert Barrat as Halasz
- Hal K. Dawson as Assistant Stage Manager
- Russell Hicks as Mr. Beyer
- Spencer Charters as Max Bauer
- Etienne Girardot as Professor Peterson
- Florence Fair as Thelma
- Nan Grey as Alice von Attem (as Nan Gray)
- Skippy as Rex (Uncredited)

== Reception ==
The New York Times reviewer, Andre Sennwald, dismissed it as "an ordinary mystery melodrama." "Among the definite failings of this smoothly filmed edition of Lajos Zilahy's play is the circumstance that, like the original, it conceals the actual murderer from the audience for such an extended period that the motivation for the homicide never becomes completely real."

== See also ==
- Cette nuit-là (1933), French film based on the play Tűzmadár
- The Open Door (1957), Spanish film based on the play Tűzmadár
