= Mária Szepes =

Hungarian author (1908–2007)

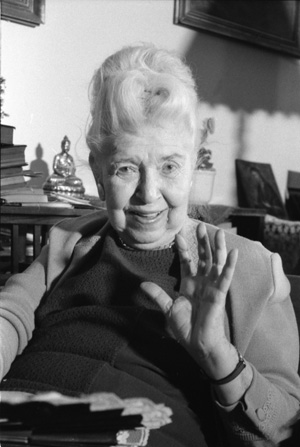
- Szepes in 1992
- Born: Magdolna Scherbach; December 14, 1908; Budapest, Austria-Hungary
- Died: September 3, 2007 (aged 98)
- Other names: Mária Papir; Mária Orsi
- Occupation: Author
- Spouse: Béla Szepes (m. 1931)

Mária Szepes (Hungarian pronunciation: [ˈmaːriɒ ˈsɛpɛʃ]; 14 December 1908 – 3 September 2007) was a Hungarian author. She worked as a journalist and screenwriter, as well as an independent author in the field of hermetic philosophy since 1941. She would sometimes write under the pseudonyms Mária Papir or Mária Orsi.

== Life ==
Szepes was born Magdolna Scherbach into a Hungarian family of theater stars in Budapest. Her father, Sándor Papir, was a bon vivant and great star of Budapest's stages. Her mother was primadonna. Her parents and her brother were to her like "brothers and sisters in spirit", as well as she admitted only spiritual relationship: "Everything else is just experience, engagement, disengagement – karma."

From 1916 to 1933, she appeared as a film actress (mostly under the name Magda Papir). One year after marrying Béla Szepes on 2 January 1931, she accompanied him to Berlin, where they lived until Hungary's German occupation towards war's end. In her book Magie der Liebe ("Magic of Love"), Szepes writes about the marriage, which lasted 56 years, and discusses the so-called "Alchemistic Marriage", the dissolution of the ego in the other.

Szepes studied literature, art history, and biology in Berlin. Back in Hungary she first worked as a journalist, screenplay writer, and author. Her first novel The Red Lion was written in a hideout during World War II and became a worldwide bestseller of esoteric literature. The two Raguel volumes are referred to as her chief work by Szepes herself.

== The Red Lion ==
The Red Lion, Mária Szepes' first novel, was published in 1946 in Hungary (original title: A Vörös Oroszlán). During the communist regime of Rákosi, The Red Lion was considered to be nonconformist and was therefore prohibited. All copies of the book were ordered to be destroyed. However, the philospoher, librarian and novelist Béla Hamvas managed to save four copies. Then, several supporters of the author typed up the novel, made templates for printing, and released the self-made copies through the underground. Almost 40 years later, the novel arrived at the desk of the Heyne publishing company via the agency Utoprop. The book was translated into German by Gottfried Feidel and was published as a paperback in 1984. More details regarding the history of origin are reported by Hans Joachim Alpers in his preface of the 2002 re-issue.

The Red Lion has been adapted to stage and is performed in various theaters of the United States.

=== Plot summary ===
Szepes tells the story of the unhappy Hans Burgner, a miller's son born in the 16th century. After the death of his weak father and of a likewise miserable but beloved teacher, he becomes afraid of the unavoidable death of all living things. Driven by a monomania fed by persistent rumors of an Elixir of Immortality, he becomes an apprentice of a mysterious physician and alchemist. However, instead of listening to the Alchemist's compassionate counsel and warnings, Burgner is driven by feverish greed to acquire the elixir, murders the alchemist; in this way, he acquires the Elixir while he is still spiritually unprepared, and is cursed thereby. This is the starting-point of a journey through the centuries: while Burgner can physically die, the Elixir enables him to retain the full memory of his previous lives as he repeatedly reincarnates into a variety of different circumstances. It also bestows upon him a profound spiritual sensitivity. Several times he attempts the Great Transmutation in order to deliver himself from his self-imposed curse. Hans Burgner is refined through his various incarnations. Against the backdrop of the last five centuries of European history, he undergoes dramatic personal development: beginning as a spiritually unawakened (and even infamous) character, he matures spiritually through the various challenges he is led to confront. He is first an initiate and Aspirant, eventually attaining the perfection of human personality which characterizes the Magus, or spiritual Adept.

== Selected filmography ==
- The Frozen Child (1921)
- Greetings and Kisses, Veronika (1933)
- Tomi (1936)
- Don't Ask Who I Was (1941)
