= Time of Trial (film) =

1942 film

- Directed by: Endre Rodríguez
- Written by: János Zalabéri Horváth
- Produced by: János Zalabéri Horváth
- Starring: Katalin Karády; László Szilassy; Artúr Somlay
- Cinematography: Barnabás Hegyi
- Edited by: László Katonka
- Music by: Szabolcs Fényes
- Production company: Horváth Film
- Distributed by: Pergõképforgalmi
- Release date: 26 October 1942
- Running time: 78 minutes
- Country: Hungary
- Language: Hungarian

Time of Trial (Hungarian: Alkalom) is a 1942 Hungarian drama film directed by Endre Rodríguez and starring Katalin Karády, László Szilassy and Artúr Somlay. It was shot at the Hunnia Studios in Budapest. A separate Bulgarian-language version Izpitanie was also produced. The two countries were aligned as Axis powers at the time.

== Cast ==
- Katalin Karády as Mária, István felesége
- László Szilassy as Báthory Béla - építész
- Artúr Somlay as Gáti István
- Gyula Csortos as Gábor - István barátja
- Tivadar Bilicsi as Orvos
- Nusi Somogyi as Sugárné
- Lajos Alszeghy as Autószerelõ
- Vera Szemere as Szobalány
- József Hell as Gátiék kisfia
- Géza Berczy as Zenész
- Lajos Selley Pincér
- József Barna szállodaportás Nizzában
- Anna Nagy
- Sándor Pethes
- János Balázs
- Ferenc Szécsi

== Bibliography ==
- Barham, Jeremey (ed.) The Routledge Companion to Global Film Music in the Early Sound Era. Taylor & Francis, 2023.
- Juhász, István. Kincses magyar filmtár 1931-1944: az eredeti forgatókönyvből 1931 és 1944 között létrejött hazai mozgóképekről. Kráter, 2007.
- Rîpeanu, Bujor. (ed.) International Directory of Cinematographers, Set- and Costume Designers in Film: Hungary (from the beginnings to 1988). Saur, 1981.
