= Machita =

1944 film

- Directed by: Endre Rodríguez
- Written by: István Mihály; Margit Pusztaszeri
- Produced by: Miklós Palugyai
- Starring: Katalin Karády; Iván Petrovich; József Bihari
- Cinematography: Rudolf Icsey
- Edited by: Lászlóné Katonka
- Music by: Janka Sásdi Schack
- Release date: 5 April 1944
- Running time: 107 minutes
- Country: Hungary
- Language: Hungarian

Machita is a 1944 Hungarian spy drama film directed by Endre Rodríguez and starring Katalin Karády, Iván Petrovich and József Bihari. The film's sets were designed by the art directors Ferenc Daday and József Simoncsics. It was Karády's last film until after the war, as she was arrested and accused of being a British agent.

== Cast ==
- Katalin Karády as Machita
- Iván Petrovich as Szávody György, gyárigazgató
- József Bihari as Török, mûvezetõ
- Sándor Szabó as Kovács Gábor, mérnök
- Beáta Barkóczy as Bözsi
- György Nagyajtay as 23-as kém
- Iván Molnár as 112-es kém
- Elemér Baló as Kémfõnök
- Sári Feleki as Titkárnõ a mulatóban
- Denis Gajzágó as 'kis nõ' a Feketerigóban
- Gusztáv Harasztos as Szávody György inasa
- Lajos Kelemen as Rendõr
- Tihamér Lázár as Vörös fõmérnök
- Mária Sterbinszky as Virágoslány

== Bibliography ==
- Cunningham, John. Hungarian Cinema: From Coffee House to Multiplex. Wallflower Press, 2004.
- Ostrowska, Dorota, Pitassio, Francesco & Varga, Zsuzsanna. Popular Cinemas in East Central Europe: Film Cultures and Histories. Bloomsbury Publishing, 2017.
