= El Lazarillo de Tormes =

- Directed by: César Fernández Ardavín
- Written by: César Fernández Ardavín
- Produced by: César Fernández Ardavín
- Starring: Marco Paoletti
- Cinematography: Manuel Berenguer
- Edited by: Magdalena Pulido
- Release date: 16 November 1959 (Spain)
- Running time: 114 minutes
- Countries: Spain; Italy
- Language: Spanish

El Lazarillo de Tormes is a 1959 Spanish-Italian film directed by César Fernández Ardavín. An adaptation of the anonymous sixteenth century novel Lazarillo de Tormes (1554), it tells the story of Lazarillo, a poor boy who has to live by his wits after being sold to a series of cruel masters.

== Plot ==
The film focuses on the childhood of Lazarillo, a young man from a very humble family who is entrusted by his mother to a blind man to serve as his apprentice.

== Cast ==
- Marco Paoletti - Lazarillo
- Juan José Menéndez - The Squire
- Carlos Casaravilla - Ciego (Blind Man)
- Memmo Carotenuto - Cómico (The Actor)
- Antonio Molino Rojo - Alguacil (Bailiff)
- Margarita Lozano - Antona
- Emilio Santiago - Sacristán de la Sagra
- Pilar Sanclemente - Ciega (Blind Girl)
- Mary Paz Pondal - Moza 1ª (Girl #1)
- Ana Rivero - Moza 2ª (Girl #2)
- Juana Cáceres - Mujer sacristán
- Luis Roses - Tejero
- Victoria Rambla - Viuda (Widow)
- Carmen Rodríguez - Hilandera vieja
- Ángeles Macua - Hilandera joven

== Awards ==
Won

- Berlin Film Festival: Golden Bear
- Premios CEC: Best Film and Best Director

== See also ==
- The Rogues (1987)
