= Deadly Spring =

1939 film

- Directed by: László Kalmár
- Written by: Lajos Zilahy
- Starring: Pál Jávor; Katalin Karády; Éva Szörényi
- Cinematography: Árpád Makay
- Edited by: Zoltán Farkas
- Music by: Tibor Polgár
- Production companies: Hunnia Filmstúdió; Pegazus Film
- Release date: 21 December 1939
- Running time: 105 minutes
- Country: Hungary
- Language: Hungarian

Deadly Spring (Hungarian: Halálos tavasz) is a 1939 Hungarian drama film directed by László Kalmár and starring Pál Jávor, Katalin Karády and Éva Szörényi. It was shot at the Hunnia Studios in Budapest. The film's sets were designed by the art directors Sándor Iliszi and József Simoncsics.

== Cast ==
- Pál Jávor as Dr. Egry István
- Katalin Karády as Ralben Edit
- Éva Szörényi as Nagy Józsa
- Ilona Tasnádi as Mrs. Ralben
- Artúr Somlay as Rt. Hon. Mr. Ralben
- Kálmán Rózsahegyi as Parish priest
- Sándor Pethes as Dr. Csokonai István
- György Kürthy as Delegate
- Panni Kéry as Margit
- Éva Szaplonczay as Bodó Irén, secretary
- Paula Bacsányi as Juli, housekeeper
- Tivadar Bilicsi as Boskó Pál, journalist
- József Bihari as Mák Pista, clerk
- Éva Adorján as Maca, Józsa's friend
- Böske T. Oláh as Guest at the party
- Gyula Kamarás as Count Ahrenberg
- Sándor Hidassy as Józsa's brother
- Dezsö Szalóky as Caretaker of the house in Buda

== Bibliography ==
- Cunningham, John. Hungarian Cinema: From Coffee House to Multiplex. Wallflower Press, 2004.
- Juhász, István. Kincses magyar filmtár 1931-1944: az eredeti forgatókönyvből 1931 és 1944 között létrejött hazai mozgóképekről. Kráter, 2007.
- Rîpeanu, Bujor. (ed.) International Directory of Cinematographers, Set- and Costume Designers in Film: Hungary (from the beginnings to 1988). Saur, 1981.
- Virginás, Andrea. Film Genres in Hungarian and Romanian Cinema: History, Theory, and Reception. Rowman & Littlefield, 2021.
