= Harrison and Barrison =

- Directed by: Alexander Korda
- Written by: Gyula Kőváry; Richárd Falk
- Produced by: Alexander Korda
- Starring: Márton Rátkai; Dezső Gyárfás; Nusi Somogyi
- Production company: Corvin Film
- Release date: 12 November 1917
- Country: Hungary
- Languages: Silent; Hungarian intertitles

Harrison and Barrison (Hungarian: Harrison és Barrison) is a 1917 Hungarian silent comedy film directed by Alexander Korda and starring Márton Rátkai, Dezsõ Gyárfás and Nusi Somogyi. Korda broke from his previous practice of adapting literary works, to direct an original screenplay. The film's style is a madcap one, which relied on the talents of its two stars Rátkai and Gyárfás who were popular comedians. It was Korda's most famous Hungarian film, better known than his literary adaptions. Korda himself considered the film his best work of the period.

== Cast ==
- Márton Rátkai
- Dezső Gyárfás
- Nusi Somogyi
- Manci Dobos
- Károly Lajthay
- Ilona Bánhidy
- Árpád id. Latabár

== Bibliography ==
- Kulik, Karol. Alexander Korda: The Man Who Could Work Miracles. Virgin Books, 1990.
- Liehm, Mira & Liehm, Antonín J. The Most Important Art: Eastern European Film After 1945. University of California Press, 1977.
