= Katalin Karády =

Hungarian actress and singer

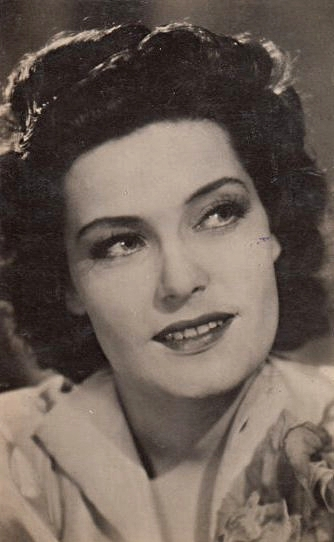
- Karády in 1940
- Born: Katalin Mária Kanczler; 8 December 1910; Budapest, Austria-Hungary
- Died: 8 February 1990 (aged 79); New York City, US
- Resting place: Farkasréti Cemetery, Budapest
- Occupations: Actress; singer
- Years active: 1939–1969
- Spouse: Rezső Varga (divorced)
- Awards: Righteous Among the Nations

Katalin Karády (8 December 1910 – 8 February 1990) was a Hungarian actress and singer. A leading actress in Hungarian movies made between 1939–1945, she is best known outside Hungary as an awardee of the Righteous Among the Nations honour for rescuing a number of Hungarian Jews.

== Biography ==
=== Early years ===
Katalin Karády was born as Katalin Kanczler, on 8 December 1910 in Budapest. She spent her childhood in the Kőbánya district with seven siblings in great poverty. Her parents were Rozália Lőrinc and Ferenc Kanczler, a shoemaker, whom Katalin remembered as an aggressive person. Helped by a charity organization, she spent five years in Switzerland and the Netherlands. After returning home, she studied in a Women's Marketing school, already famed for her beauty. With the language knowledge from previous years, her simple clothing and vigorous demand for cleanliness, she already stood out from her classmates. After her father's death in 1930, she married Rezső Varga, a customs official, 30 years older than herself, but they divorced after a few months.

She started acting in 1936, taking classes from Ernő Tarnay, and Artúr Bárdos. After gaining the attention of journalist Zoltán Egyed in a bar in Buda (who also proposed the name Karády) she was introduced to Ilona Aczél, a former actress, in whose acting school she learned the basics of the profession in the following three years, including singing. Karády's first performance was during the 1930s, in Dániel Jób's theatres: between 1931 and 1941, she appeared in the Pesti Színház and Vígszínház in various roles.

=== Becoming a star ===
Her first movie role, Halálos Tavasz (Deadly Spring) gave her instant fame as a diva and sex-symbol, supported by her unusual, humming voice, and "femme fatale" character. In the next nine years, she appeared in 20 movies. Zoltán Egyed became her manager, and successfully created a Hollywood-like image around her, as a result, thousands of fans tried to mimic her clothing, hairstyle and behavior throughout the country. Karády's personal life was a constant topic of gossip, bringing conflicting rumors about her being a nymphomaniac, or a lesbian. The theories were stirred up even more when she had an intimate relationship with Regent Miklós Horthy's secret service chief, István Ujszászy, who also proposed to her, and bought her a villa.

=== Downfall ===
After the German invasion of Hungary, authorities put pressure on Karády by banning her songs from the National Radio, her new film Machita from theatres, and stopping the ongoing production of Gazdátlan asszony (Orphan woman) (later the crew finished the movie with Erzsi Simor). In 1944 she was arrested with allegations that she spied for the Allied Forces. Karády was in prison for three months, during which time she was tortured, and nearly beaten to death. She was rescued by friends of Major General Ujszászy, in dire condition both physically and emotionally. Despite mishaps, she carried on with life in the war-torn capital, even rescuing numerous families at the bank of the Danube waiting to be shot by Arrow Cross guards, in exchange for personal belongings and gold which she had saved from her robbed apartment. She took a number of children home to care for them until the fighting stopped. In the summer of 1945 came news from Moscow that General Ujszászy was dead, though later evidence showed that at that time he was still alive. Suffering from a nervous breakdown, she lay in bed for the following nine months.

=== Later years ===
After the war, Karády became increasingly disregarded. Between 1945–48, she appeared in the Operettszínház in a few leading roles. Hungary's post-war film industry did not count on her (besides two movies, Forró mezők being her last). Being a popular star of the Horthy era, there was no place for her under the new communist rule. In 1949, all of her films were banned along with her theater appearances. Being able to work at only small venues in the countryside, often with a drunk audience, she left the country in 1951 permanently. First she lived in Salzburg, Austria, then moved to Switzerland, and after a year to Brussels.

In 1953, she lived in São Paulo, Brazil, opening a fashion shop. In 1968, finally receiving a visa after Ted and Robert Kennedy intervened, she moved to New York City, opening a hat salon. Performing rarely and for friends only, she lived in retirement, refusing to appear in the media. Receiving a governmental invitation at her 70th birthday to return to Hungary, she only sent a hat, baffling officials.

She died on 8 February 1990. On 19 February her body was transferred to Hungary, where a memorial service was held in Budapest at the St. Stephen's Basilica, after which she was buried in Farkasréti Cemetery.

== Legacy ==
- In her home country, Karády became forgotten during the communist era and was unknown to younger generations through the 1960s and 1970s. She was rediscovered in the early 1980s, especially due to the album Sohase mondd (1982 – Never Say) by singer/actress Judit Hernádi, that paid hommage to Karády's singing style and attitude.
- The 2001 film Hamvadó cigarettavég by Péter Bacsó is dedicated to her memory. In 2004, for her courageous acts during World War II, she received the posthumous Righteous medal from the Yad Vashem Institute.
- Asteroid 287787 Karády, discovered by Hungarian astronomers Krisztián Sárneczky and Brigitta Sipőcz at Piszkéstető Station in 2003, was named in her memory. The official naming citation was published by the Minor Planet Center on 29 August 2015 (M.P.C. 95312).
- Her figure at Madame Tussauds Budapest portrays Karády in an elegant black evening gown, styled in accordance with her classic 1930s–1940s screen persona. She is shown standing beside a vintage Mercedes-Benz—with one hand slightly raised in a poised, expressive gesture characteristic of her dramatic on-screen presence. A white fur stole draped over her arms enhances the glamorous aesthetic associated with her roles.

== Stage roles ==
- Szabolcs Fényes: Maya....Maya
- W. Somerset Maugham - Zoe Atkins: Az asszony és az ördög (Woman and Satan)....Lady Elizabeth
- János Bókay: First Love....Gabi
- Edward Sheldon: Romance....Rita
- Mikhail Artsybashev: Jealousy....Jelena
- Fényes: The Queen's Kiss....Izabella
- Viktor Jacobi: Sybill....Sybill
- Rudolf Halász: Black Lily....Zia
- Ferenc Fendrik: Vera and her Family....Vera
- Pál Ábrahám: Ball in the Savoy....La Tangolita

== Filmography ==
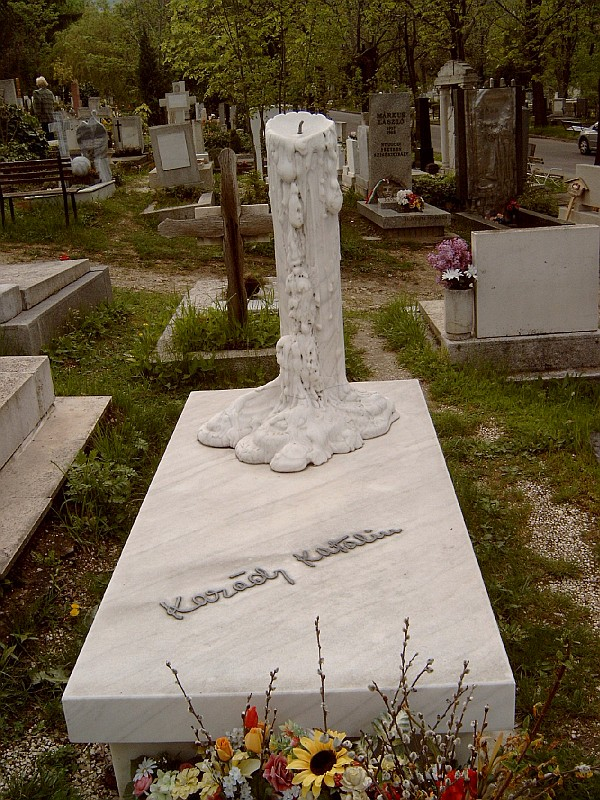
Karády's grave in Budapest

- Deadly Spring (1939)
- Queen Elizabeth (1940)
- Haunting Spirit (1940)
- A Bowl of Lentils (1941)
- Don't Ask Who I Was (1941)
- Temptation (1942)
- A szűz és a gödölye (1941) – (A virgin and a kid)
- Sirius (1942)
- Tábori levelezőlap (short) (1942) – (Camp Postcard)
- Deadly Kiss (1942)
- Disillusion (1943)
- Time of Trial (1942)
- Valahol Oroszországban (short) (1942) – (Somewhere in Russia)
- A Heart Stops Beating (1942)
- Ópiumkeringő (1942) – (Opiumwaltz)
- Suburban Guard Post (1943)
- Makrancos hölgy (1943) – (The Taming of the Shrew)
- Happy Times (1943)
- Something in the Water (1944)
- Eva Szovathy (1944)
- Machita (1944)
- Hangod elkísér (short) (1944) – (Your voice accompanied me)
- Betlehemi királyok (short) (1947) – (Kings of Bethlehem)
- Hot Fields (1949)

== Songs ==
- Hamvadó cigarettavég (Smoldering Cigarette-end)
- Valahol Oroszországban (Somewhere in Russia)
- Hiába menekülsz (Scape Vain)
- Ugye gondolsz néha rám? (Do you think of me sometimes, don't you?)
- Ezt a nagy szerelmet tőled kaptam én (This grate love I become of you)
- Ne kérdezd, ki voltam! (Don't ask me who I was)
- Szeretlek én (I love you)
- Tudom, hogy vársz (I know you expect me)
- Mindig az a perc (Always that minute)
- Ez lett a vesztünk

== Discography ==
- 1979 Karády Katalin (LP)
- 1982 Karády Katalin: Tudok egy dalt (LP)
- 1986 Karády Katalin: Te vagy a fény (LP)
- 1990 Karády Katalin: Nincs vége még (CD/MK)

== Film music ==
1979 in the movie Szabadíts meg a gonosztól (songs "Tudom, hogy vársz", "Mindig az a perc" and "Hamvadó cigarettavég")

== Records for archive films ==
- 1980 Bizalom (just her song)
- 1987 A Jávor

== See also ==
- Hungarian pop
