= Happy Times (1943 film) =

1943 film

- Directed by: Endre Rodríguez
- Written by: Pál Barabás
- Produced by: Miklós Palugyai
- Starring: Katalin Karády; Andor Ajtay; Ernö Mihályi
- Cinematography: Rudolf Icsey
- Music by: Béla Malcsiner
- Production company: Jupiter Film
- Release date: 31 December 1943
- Running time: 91 minutes
- Country: Hungary
- Language: Hungarian

Happy Times (Hungarian: Boldog idők) is a 1943 Hungarian drama film directed by Endre Rodríguez and starring Katalin Karády, Andor Ajtay and Ernö Mihályi. The film's sets were designed by the art director József Simoncsics.

== Cast ==
- Katalin Karády as Éva
- Andor Ajtay as Péter, Éva férje
- Ernö Mihályi as Sándor, a szegény rokon
- Ibolya Bilinszky as Ica
- Sándor Szabó as Márton
- Erzsi Orsolya as Házmesterné
- Tibor Puskás as Robbi
- Margit Kopácsy as Fiatal hölgy
- Ilona Kökény as Hölgy a kesztyüsboltban

== Bibliography ==
- Juhász, István. Kincses magyar filmtár 1931-1944: az eredeti forgatókönyvből 1931 és 1944 között létrejött hazai mozgóképekről. Kráter, 2007.
- Rîpeanu, Bujor. (ed.) International Directory of Cinematographers, Set- and Costume Designers in Film: Hungary (from the beginnings to 1988). Saur, 1981.
