= Erzsébet Házy =

Hungarian operatic soprano

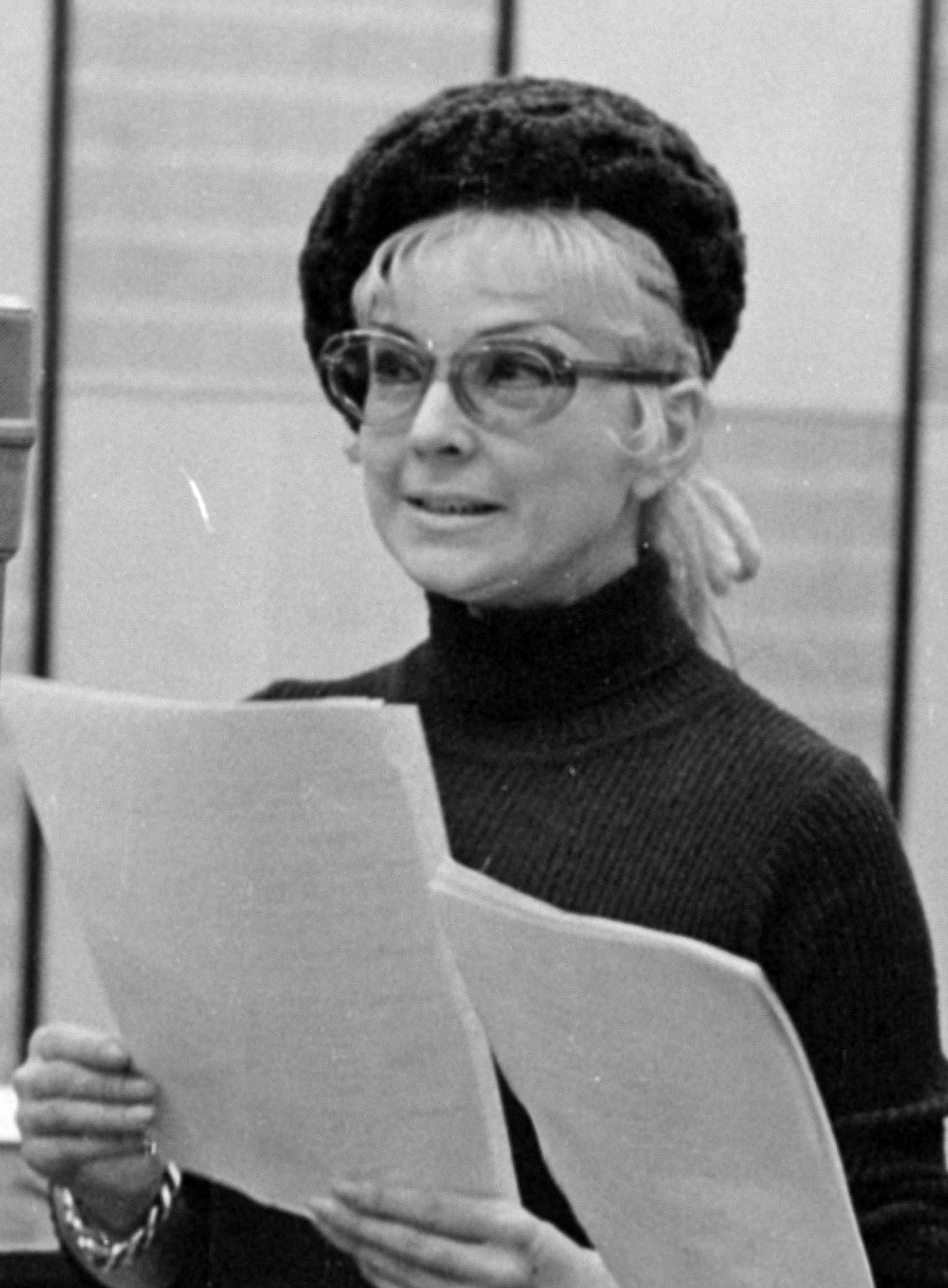
- Házy in 1973
- Born: 1 October 1929; Bratislava, Czechoslovakia
- Died: 24 November 1982 (aged 53); Budapest, Hungary
- Occupations: Operatic soprano; actress
- Years active: 1951–1982
- Spouse(s): Róbert Ilosfalvy; Iván Darvas

Erzsébet Házy (Hungarian pronunciation: [ˈɛrʒeːbɛt ˈhaːzi]; 1 October 1929 – 24 November 1982) was a Hungarian operatic soprano. She fascinated the critics (see 'Critics' below) and audience not only with her voice but also with perfect acting and her beauty. She was particularly admired for her portrayal of the title heroine in Giacomo Puccini’s Manon Lescaut.

== Biography ==
Born in Bratislava, Czechoslovakia to Hungarian parents, Házy grew up in her parents' native country and was a Hungarian citizen. She studied singing at the Franz Liszt Academy of Music with Géza László. She began her career as a member of the Hungarian Radio Choir before making her professional opera debut in 1951 as Oscar in Giuseppe Verdi's Un ballo in maschera at the Hungarian State Opera House. She remained committed to that house for many years where she excelled in soubrette and coloratura soprano roles. She notably appeared in several world premieres at that house, including Sándor Szokolay's Hamlet (1968), Szokolay's Samson (1973), and György Ránki's Az ember tragédiája (1970, "The Tragedy of Man").

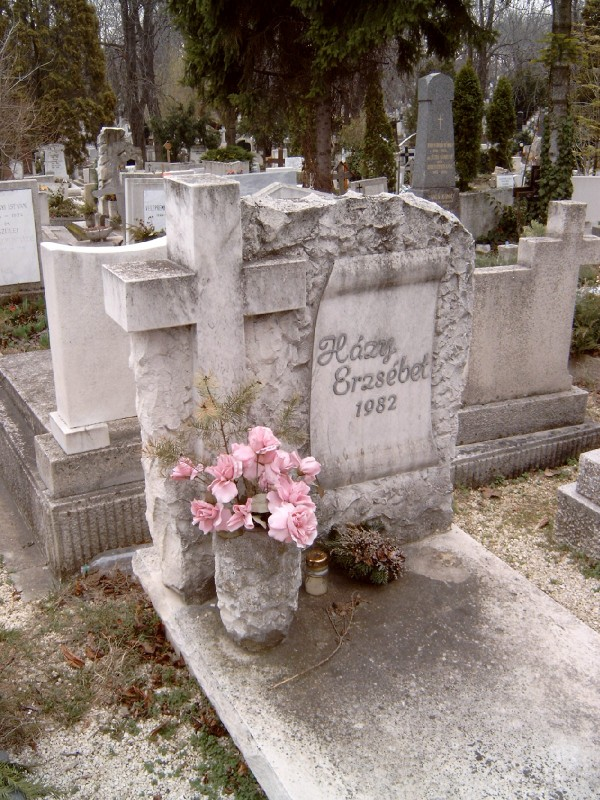
Tomb of Erzsébet Házy in the Farkasréti Cemetery

Házy also worked regularly as a performer in operettas at the Vienna Volksoper for many years. As a guest artist she made appearances at the Prague State Opera, Sofia National Opera, Romanian National Opera, Bucharest, Great Theatre, Warsaw, Glyndebourne Festival, Finnish National Opera, Teatro Comunale di Bologna, Oper Köln, Komische Oper Berlin, Sydney Opera House, and the Internationale Maifestspiele Wiesbaden.

Házy was awarded the Franz Liszt Prize in 1963, was appointed a Meritorious Artist in 1968, and in 1970 she received the Kossuth Prize by the People's Republic of Hungary. She died from ovarian cancer in Budapest, Hungary at the age of 53.

== Critics ==
"When she stepped on the podium, she enthused the atmosphere with her soul. She was the type of artist who carried a unique aura. This was the main secret of her success at home and abroad. She had that almost indefinable ability by which a great actress or a singer-personality does not live her part, rather she becomes the personification of it." (Musicologist Peter Varnai)

== Recordings ==
German CDs:

- Der Zigeunerbaron, Label: RCA Red S. (Sony Music)
- Gräfin Mariza, Philips
- Other CDs:
- Erzsébet Házy: Soprano Arias; Hungaroton HCD31996
- Puccini: Manon Lescaut (Sung in Hungarian); HCD12648-49
- Abraham, P.: Operettas; HCD16886
- Kálmán: A csárdás királynő (Die Csárdásfürstin) (excerpts) HCD 16780
- Kálmán, Lehár: Operettrészletek (Operetta Excerpts) HCD 16847
- Lehár: Arany és ezüst - Gold and Silver (The Land of Smiles, Giuditta; excerpts) HCD 16809
- Kálmán: Cirkuszhercegnő/Cigányprímás (Die Zirkusprinzessin/Der Zigeunerprimas (excerpts) HCD 16876
- Lehár: Luxemburg grófja / Der Graf von Luxemburg (excerpts)Cigányszerelem / Der Zigeunerliebe (excerpts) HCD 16877
- Zeller, C.: Vogelhandler (Der) / Millöcker, K.: Gräfin Dubarry; HCD16583
- Szokolay: Vernász (Blood Wedding); HCD11262-63
- Simándy, József – Operetta excerpts HCD 16880
- Ilosfalvy, Róbert: Tenor Opera Arias; HCD31762
- Bizet: Carmen (excerpts) (Sung in Hungarian); HCD32026
- Fifty Years of Hungaroton Singers (1951–2001) HCD 32096-98

== Filmography ==
German operetta films with Erzsébet Házy:

- Der Zigeunerbaron (1965, Szaffi) with Rudolf Schock, Eberhard Wächter; (in the archive of WDR)
- Gräfin Mariza (1973, Mariza) with René Kollo; (Unitel, in the archive of ZDF)
- Budapester Nächte (1973), Musikalische Impressionen einer Stadt; (ZDF’s archive)

Hungarian films with Erzsébet Házy:

- Gábor diák - 1956 (Veronika's voice)
- Adventure in Gerolstein - 1957 (Antónia, Grand Duchess of Gerolstein)
- Up the Slope - 1959 (Takács Éva)
- Éjszakai repülés - 1963
- Új Gilgames - 1964 (Klári)
- Férjhez menni tilos! - 1964 (Lillian)
- Denevér - 1965 (Adél)
- And Then The Guy... - 1966 (Széphalminé)
- Zenés TV színház-Vérnász - 1974 (Bride)
