= Sabotage (1942 film) =

1942 film

- Directed by: Emil Martonffy
- Written by: Géza Csörögi
- Produced by: Antal Koncz
- Starring: Erzsi Simor; Valéria Hidvéghy; Ferenc Kiss
- Cinematography: István Berendik; Rudolf Icsey
- Edited by: Lajos Paál
- Music by: Béla Dolecskó
- Production company: Csörögi Film
- Release date: 10 May 1942
- Running time: 82 minutes
- Country: Hungary
- Language: Hungarian

Sabotage (Hungarian: Szabotázs) is a 1942 Hungarian thriller film directed by Emil Martonffi and starring Erzsi Simor, Valéria Hidvéghy and Ferenc Kiss. It was shot at the Hunnia Studios in Budapest. The film's sets were designed by the art director Lajos Lévay.

== Cast ==
- Erzsi Simor as Mariska
- Valéria Hidvéghy as Évi, Dobó lánya
- Ferenc Kiss as Demeter Iván villanyszerelõ
- László Földényi as Dobó mûvezetõ
- Gyula Benkö as Benkõ Ferenc mérnök
- Nusi Somogyi as Kantinosnõ
- Géza Berczy as Titkár
- Lenke Egyed as Mariska anyja
- Dóra Fáy Kiss as Szûsné
- Hilda Gobbi as Feketéné
- György Gonda as ügynök
- Gusztáv Harasztos as Igazgató
- Gitta Hódy as Kocsmároslány
- Ottó Jeney as Nyomozó
- Rezsõ Acsay as Doktor
- Lajos Kelemen as Megbízó
- Lajos Kozma as Gyári tisztviselõ
- János Makláry as Szûs, Mihály
- Gabriella Morócz as Kocsmárosnõ
- Ferenc Pethes as Fekete Pista
- Pál Szabó as Munkás
- Gyula Szöreghy as Munkás

== Bibliography ==
- Juhász, István. Kincses magyar filmtár 1931–1944: az eredeti forgatókönyvből 1931 és 1944 között létrejött hazai mozgóképekről. Kráter, 2007.
- Rîpeanu, Bujor. (ed.) International Directory of Cinematographers, Set- and Costume Designers in Film: Hungary (from the beginnings to 1988). Saur, 1981.
