= Something in the Water (1944 film) =

1944 film

- Directed by: Lajos Zilahy
- Written by: Lajos Zilahy
- Based on: Something in the Water by Lajos Zilahy
- Produced by: István Beszedits
- Starring: Katalin Karády; Pál Jávor; Klára Pápai
- Cinematography: Árpád Makay
- Edited by: Mária Vály
- Music by: Tibor Polgár
- Production company: Pegazus Film
- Release date: 26 January 1944
- Running time: 98 minutes
- Country: Hungary
- Language: Hungarian

Something in the Water (Hungarian: Valamit visz a víz) is a 1944 Hungarian drama film directed by Lajos Zilahy and starring Katalin Karády, Pál Jávor and Klára Pápai. It was shot at the Hunnia Studios in Budapest. Zilahy adapted the screenplay from his own 1928 novel.

== Synopsis ==
János a fisherman, lives happily with his wife and child. One day at mysterious but attractive woman is washed ashore on the river. The family take her in to recover, but she begins to exert a disturbing power over János.

== Cast ==
- Katalin Karády as Anada
- Pál Jávor as János, fisher
- Klára Pápai as Zsuzsánna, Wife os János
- Gyula Koltai as Old Mihály
- Lajos Alszeghy as Gergely
- Gyula Kamarás as Lord
- László Baksa Soós as Doctor
- Lajos Sugár as jeweller
- István Szegedi Szabó as Stranger man
- Jenõ Nádoras pharmacist

== Bibliography ==
- Juhász, István. Kincses magyar filmtár 1931-1944: az eredeti forgatókönyvből 1931 és 1944 között létrejött hazai mozgóképekről. Kráter, 2007.
- Rîpeanu, Bujor. (ed.) International Directory of Cinematographers, Set- and Costume Designers in Film: Hungary (from the beginnings to 1988). Saur, 1981.
- Somlyódy, László & Somlyódy, Nóra. Hungarian Arts and Sciences: 1848-2000. Social Science Monographs, 2003.
- Taylor, Richard (ed.) The BFI companion to Eastern European and Russian cinema. British Film Institute, 2000.
