= Nusi Somogyi =

Hungarian actress (1890–1963)

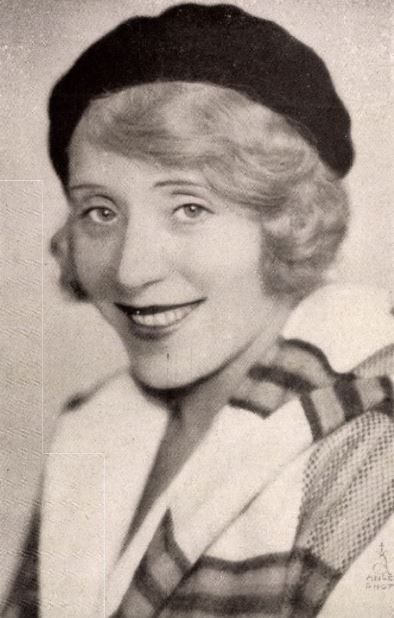
- Somogyi in 1931
- Born: Anna Irén Somogyi; 3 March 1890; Budapest, Austro-Hungarian Empire
- Died: October 8, 1963 (aged 73); Budapest, Hungary
- Occupation: Actress
- Years active: 1914–1964

Nusi Somogyi (born Anna Irén Somogyi; March 3, 1890 – October 8, 1963) was a Hungarian film and stage actress.

== Biography ==
Somogyi was the daughter of master brewer István Somogyi Hollósi and Anna Mesterházy. She studied at the Deák tér Reformed Civil School in Budapest, and then became a student at the acting school of the National Actors' Association. She appeared on stage in Kecskemét with Miklós Mariházy's troupe, then Sándor Rott invited her to the Folies Caprice and was also a member of the Jardin de Paris. In the summer of 1910, she joined the National Theatre of Szeged, where Jenő Krémer was the director. Then, at the invitation of László Beöthy, she signed a contract with the Király Theater, where she replaced Juci Lábass in the Sybill operetta after the 35th performance until the 100th performance, due to the actress' illness. The Theater Life 1914/15 issue wrote about him as follows: "Now the audience of the King's Theater can tell night after night that the choice of the theater was very lucky. Nusi Somogyi is not only a dizzying dancer, but also a kind, imaginative and talented actress, who still has a great career ahead of her in this field".

In November 1916, Somogyi became a member of the Hungarian State Opera which was under the management of László Beöthy at the time, then attended the Franz Liszt Academy of Music. In October 1919, she signed a contract with the Király Theater again, and in 1923 she became a member of the Blaha Lujza Theater. In 1928 she performed in Vienna, and in 1931 she made a guest appearance at the Capital Operetta Theatre. On July 16, 1929, Somogyi married Count Ferenc Ákos Kálmán Béldi, a landowner. She played at the Royal Orpheum between 1933 and 1940, but in 1939 was also member of the Márkus Park Theater, in 1941 of the Madách Theater, and in 1942 she performed as an artist of the Vidám Színház. In 1945, the verification committee banned her from the stage for three years on the pretext that Somogyi was a "fanatic Hitler worshiper". In 1946, however, she already played at the Operettszínház, then in 1947 at the Medgyaszay Theater. In 1951, she was a member of Kisvariet, and later of Népvariet, and from 1954 she appeared in the Capital Operetta Theatre. She performed at the Blaha Lujza Theater from 1957 to 1959, then retired in 1960.

As an emancipated woman, she often participated in car races and horse races in Hungary with her own car.

== Selected filmography ==
- Harrison and Barrison (1917)
- Mary Ann (1918)
- White Rose (1919)
- Neither at Home or Abroad (1919)
- Purple Lilacs (1934)
- Cafe Moscow (1936)
- Sensation (1936)
- Tales of Budapest (1937)
- Wedding in Toprin (1939)
- Unknown Opponent (1940)
- Everybody Loves Someone Else (1940)
- Taken by the Flood (1941)
- Don't Ask Who I Was (1941)
- Sirius (1942)
- Time of Trial (1942)
- Magdolna (1942)
- Sabotage (1942)
- I Am Guilty (1942)
- Lóránd Fráter (1942)
- Orient Express (1943)
- The Marsh Flower (1943)
- I Dreamed of You (1943)
- Annamária (1943)
- Suburban Guard Post (1943)
- Masterless Woman (1944)
- Springtime in Budapest (1955)
- Two Confessions (1957)
- What a Night! (1958)
- A Bird of Heaven (1958)
- St. Peter's Umbrella (1958)
- Up the Slope (1959)
- For Whom the Larks Sing (1959)
- Kálvária (1960)
- Red Ink (1960)
- Be True Until Death (1960)
- A Husband for Susy (1960)

== Bibliography ==
- Kulik, Karol. Alexander Korda: The Man Who Could Work Miracles. Virgin Books, 1990.
