= Silent Monastery =

1941 film

- Directed by: Endre Rodríguez
- Written by: Miklós Asztalos
- Based on: Silent Monastery by József Eötvös
- Produced by: Géza Lipót Zichy
- Starring: Klári Tolnay; Margit Lukács; Pál Jávor
- Cinematography: István Eiben
- Edited by: Zoltán Farkas
- Music by: Géza Zichy
- Production company: Mûvelõdés Film
- Release date: 22 December 1941
- Running time: 95 minutes
- Country: Hungary
- Language: Hungarian

Silent Monastery (Hungarian: Néma kolostor) is a 1941 Hungarian historical drama film directed by Endre Rodríguez and starring Klári Tolnay, Margit Lukács and Pál Jávor. The film's sets were designed by the art director János Pagonyi.

== Cast ==
- Klári Tolnay as Betti
- Margit Lukács as Ebelsberg Júlia grófnõ
- Pál Jávor as Gróf Vághelyi Gusztáv
- Andor Ajtay as Dahlberg
- Imre Toronyi as Prior
- Lajos Boray as Gróf Ebelsperg
- Margit Szathmáry as Auerbach báróné
- György Kürthy as Hoepfner
- Bea Egerváry as Liza
- Sándor Pethes as Sziluettkészítõ
- Zoltán Makláry as Betti apja
- György Solthy as Voronin Hercege
- Béla Fáy as Armand
- Sándor Kömíves as Horsetzky báró
- György Nagyajtay as Kolbenhauer
- Károly Fröhlich as Népi énekes

== Bibliography ==
- Hames, Peter (ed.) The Cinema of Central Europe. Wallflower Press, 2004.
- Juhász, István. Kincses magyar filmtár 1931-1944: az eredeti forgatókönyvből 1931 és 1944 között létrejött hazai mozgóképekről. Kráter, 2007.
- Rîpeanu, Bujor. (ed.) International Directory of Cinematographers, Set- and Costume Designers in Film: Hungary (from the beginnings to 1988). Saur, 1981.
