= Endre Rodríguez =

Hungarian film director

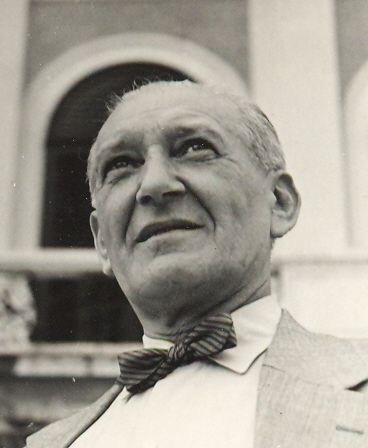
- Rodríguez in 1964.
- Born: 28 April 1899; Budapest, Austria-Hungary
- Died: 5 August 1975 (aged 76); Munich, Bavaria, West Germany
- Other name: André Rodriguez
- Occupations: Director, Screenwriter
- Years active: 1938–1954 (film)

Endre Rodríguez (1899–1975) was a Hungarian screenwriter and film director. After service in the Austro-Hungarian Army during the First World War, he became a professional stage actor. During the silent era he first became interested in film, and emerged as a prominent director during the late 1930s and wartime Hungary. After 1944 he made educational and documentary films, and fled abroad after the failed Hungarian Revolution of 1956, settling in Munich in West Germany.

== Selected filmography ==
- Istvan Bors (1939)
- You Are the Song (1940)
- Unknown Opponent (1940)
- Silent Monastery (1941)
- Taken by the Flood (1941)
- Male Fidelity (1942)
- Costume Ball (1942)
- Time of Trial (1942)
- Happy Times (1943)
- Machita (1944)

== Bibliography ==
- Hames, Peter: The Cinema Of Central Europe. Wallflower Press, 2004.
- Laura, Ernesto G.: Tutti i film di Venezia, 1932–1984. La Biennale, Settore cinema e spettacolo televisivo, 1985.
- Várkonyi, Vilmos: Jávor Pál: és a magyar film aranykora. Zima Szabolcs, 2013
