= József Kürthy =

Hungarian actor (1881–1939)

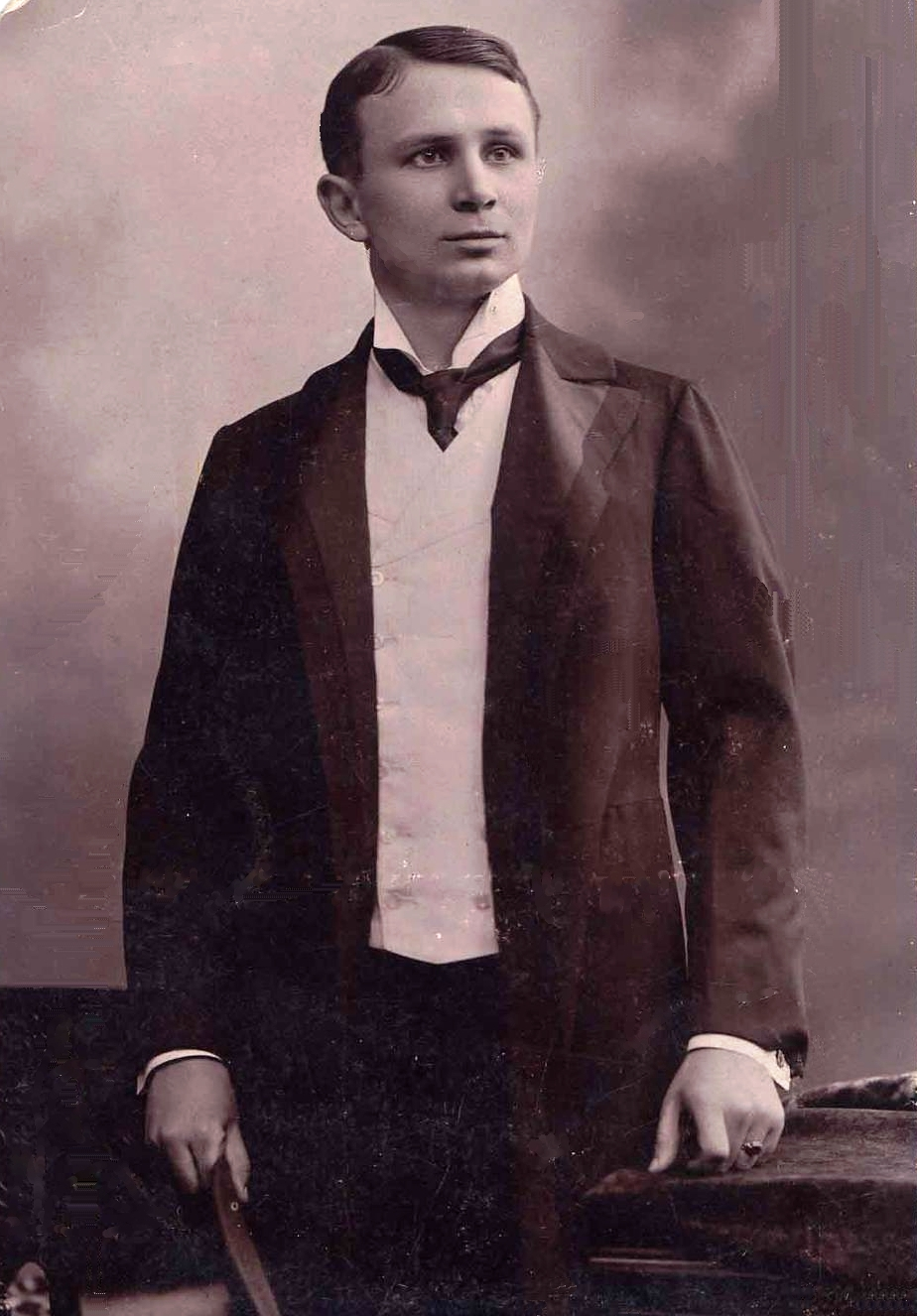
Kürthy c. 1900

József Kürthy (14 July 1881 – 18 June 1939) was a Hungarian actor. He was born in Szatmárnémeti, Austria-Hungary (now Satu Mare, Romania) and died in Budapest.

== Selected filmography ==
- The Village Rogue (1916)
- St. Peter's Umbrella (1917)
- Jön az öcsém (1919)
- Szép Ilonka (1920)
- Rongyosok (1926)
- Budapest Pastry Shop (1935)
- Address Unknown (1935)
- Dream Love (1935)
- Varjú a toronyórán (1938)
- Süt a nap (1938)
- Two Prisoners (1938)
- Hungary's Revival (1939)
- Princess of the Puszta (1939)

== Bibliography ==
- Cunningham, John. Hungarian Cinema: From Coffee House to Multiplex. Wallflower Press, 2004.
