= Up the Slope =

1959 film

- Directed by: Viktor Gertler
- Written by: Szilárd Darvas; Pál Királyhegyi
- Produced by: Ottó Elek
- Starring: Erzsébet Házy; György Kálmán; Imre Ráday
- Cinematography: István Eiben
- Edited by: Sándor Zákonyi
- Music by: Tibor Polgár
- Production company: Mafilm
- Release date: 5 March 1959
- Running time: 88 minutes
- Country: Hungary
- Language: Hungarian

Up the Slope (Hungarian: Felfelé a lejtön) is a 1959 Hungarian romantic comedy film directed by Viktor Gertler and starring Erzsébet Házy, György Kálmán and Imre Ráday. It was shot at the Hunnia Studios in Budapest. The film's sets were designed by the art director Béla Zeichan.

== Cast ==
- Erzsébet Házy as Takács Éva
- György Kálmán as Mester Lajos
- László Kazal as Api
- Imre Ráday as Vannai Jenõ
- Oszkár Ascher as Doktor úr
- Gyula Benkö as Koncz István, mérnök
- István Egri as Gyárigazgató
- László Hlatky as Mackó
- László Keleti as Sebes Albert, Maca apja
- Ervin Kibédi as Szabó Péter, mérnök
- Sándor Peti as Perjés Ábris, fodrász
- Tibor Benedek as Pincér
- Irén Psota as Sebes Maca, énekesnõ
- János Rajz as Pista bácsi, portás
- Lenke Lorán as Boldizsár Piroska
- Ernö Szabó as Fõkönyvelõ
- Gellért Raksányi as Pityu a csapos
- István Rozsos as Frici
- Nusi Somogyi
- László Földényi
- Hédi Dévai
- János Dömsödi
- Zoltán Gera
- János Gönczöl
- János Horkay as Áruházi rabló
- József Kautzky as Pubi
- Ilona Kállay as Singer Wannabe

== Bibliography ==
- Balski, Grzegorz. Directory of Eastern European Film-makers and Films 1945-1991. Flicks Books, 1992.
- Homoródy, József. Magyar film, 1948-1963. Filmtudományi Intézet, 1964.
- Rîpeanu, Bujor. (ed.) International Directory of Cinematographers, Set- and Costume Designers in Film: Hungary (from the beginnings to 1988). Saur, 1981.
