= Haunting Spirit =

1940 film

- Directed by: Lajos Zilahy
- Written by: Lajos Zilahy
- Based on: Haunting Spirit by Lajos Zilahy
- Starring: Katalin Karády; Antal Páger; Gyula Csortos
- Cinematography: István Eiben
- Edited by: Zoltán Farkas
- Music by: Tibor Polgár
- Production company: Pegazus Film
- Release date: 28 October 1940
- Running time: 95 minutes
- Country: Hungary
- Language: Hungarian

Haunting Spirit (Hungarian: Hazajáró lélek) is a 1940 Hungarian drama film directed by Lajos Zilahy and starring Katalin Karády, Antal Páger and Gyula Csortos. It was shot at the Hunnia Studios in Budapest. The film's sets were designed by the art director Imre Sörés.

== Synopsis ==
A former singer's happy marriage comes under increasing strain due to her husband's jealousy. He hires private detectives to follow her and even believes that a contract he has earned has been given to him by a man who is his wife's lover. When he dies in a railway accident, his wife is haunted by what she feels is his reproachful spirit. Eventually she is able to find happiness with her husband's formed assistant.

== Cast ==
- Katalin Karády as Mária
- Antal Páger as Török Ágoston mérnök
- Gyula Csortos as Mulatótulajdonos
- Gerö Mály as Török inasa
- Lajos Hajmássy as Arany István mérnök
- Piroska Vaszary as Náni, Török házvezetõnõje
- Manyi Kiss as Mici, táncosnõ
- Magdolna Féja as Talber barátnõje
- Blanka Raffay as Táncosnõ, mici utóda
- Sándor Pethes as Báró dulcinsky
- József Bihari as Postás
- Sándor Hidassy as Rendõr
- Ernö Mihályi as Mayer úr, a 'Rézkrajcár' tulajdonosa
- Lenke Egyed as Eta néni, Mária gondviselõje
- István Károlyi as Sofõr
- György Kürthy as Béla bácsi
- Lajos Sugár as Fõpincér
- Ferenc Szabó as Pincér
- Gyula Szöreghy as Sírköves

== Bibliography ==
- Juhász, István. Kincses magyar filmtár 1931–1944: az eredeti forgatókönyvből 1931 és 1944 között létrejött hazai mozgóképekről. Kráter, 2007.
- Rîpeanu, Bujor. (ed.) International Directory of Cinematographers, Set- and Costume Designers in Film: Hungary (from the beginnings to 1988). Saur, 1981.
- Taylor, Richard (ed.) The BFI companion to Eastern European and Russian cinema. British Film Institute, 2000.
