= Tibor Polgár =

Hungarian composer

- Born: 11 March 1907; Budapest, Austro-Hungarian Empire
- Died: 27 August 1993 (aged 86); Montreal, Quebec, Canada
- Occupation: Composer
- Years active: 1935–1978 (film)

Tibor Polgár (1907–1993) was a Hungarian composer of film scores. After working for several decades in the Hungarian film industry, spanning both the Horthy era and the Communist period, he emigrated to Canada.

== Selected filmography ==
- The New Landlord (1935)
- The Golden Man (1936)
- Sensation (1936)
- Beauty of the Pusta (1937)
- Deadly Spring (1939)
- Rózsafabot (1940)
- Haunting Spirit (1940)
- The Gyurkovics Boys (1941)
- A Bowl of Lentils (1941)
- Magdolna (1942)
- The Perfect Family (1942)
- Sirius (1942)
- Beautiful Star (1942)
- Devil Rider (1944)
- Something in the Water (1944)
- The Schoolmistress (1945)
- Song of the Cornfields (1947)
- The Siege of Beszterce (1948)
- Gala Suit (1949)
- Singing Makes Life Beautiful (1950)
- Déryné (1951)
- Relatives (1954)
- Keep Your Chin Up (1954)
- Accident (1955)
- Sunday Romance (1957)
- Don Juan's Last Adventure (1958)
- Up the Slope (1959)
- Red Ink (1960)
- In Praise of Older Women (1978)

== Bibliography ==
- Petrucci, Antonio. Twenty Years of Cinema in Venice. International Exhibition of Cinematographic Art, 1952.
- Rîpeanu, Bujor. (ed.) International Directory of Cinematographers, Set- and Costume Designers in Film: Hungary (from the beginnings to 1988). Saur, 1981.
- Wise, Wyndham. Take One's Essential Guide to Canadian Film. University of Toronto Press, 2001.
