= César Fernández Ardavín =

Spanish film director (1923–2012)

- Born: 22 July 1923; Madrid, Spain
- Died: 7 September 2012 (aged 89); Boadilla del Monte, Spain
- Occupations: Film director Screenwriter
- Years active: 1952–1979

César Fernández Ardavín (22 July 1923 – 7 September 2012) was a Spanish film director and screenwriter. He directed more than 40 films between 1952 and 1979. His 1959 film El Lazarillo de Tormes won the Golden Bear at the 10th Berlin International Film Festival. His 1969 film The Wanton of Spain was entered into the 6th Moscow International Film Festival.

He was the nephew of the director Eusebio Fernández Ardavín and began his career working for him.

== Selected filmography ==
- Neutrality (1949)
- The Call of Africa (1952)
- An Impossible Crime (1954)
- Tangier Assignment (1955)
- The Cat (1956)
- The Open Door (1957)
- El Lazarillo de Tormes (1959)
- The Wanton of Spain (1969)
