= Oszkár Maleczky =

Hungarian opera singer (1894–1972)

- Maleczky Oszkár
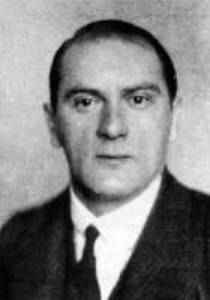
- c. 1930s
- Born: Maleczky Oszkár; February 6, 1894; Budapest
- Died: February 22, 1972 (aged 78)
- Education: Franz Liszt Academy Of Music
- Occupation: singer
- Awards: Kossuth Prize

Oszkár Maleczky (Budapest, February 6, 1894 – Budapest, February 22, 1972) was a Kossuth Prize-winning Hungarian baritone opera singer. His parents were Vilmos Maleczky and Jozefa Ellinger. His sister was Bianka Maleczky.

== Career ==
He studied singing at the Music Academy. Between 1925 and 1927, he sang at the City Theatre, and from 1927 until his retirement, he was a member of the Opera House company. From 1931 to 1962, he taught singing and stage performance at the Music Academy. He performed both heroic baritone and buffo roles.
