= Gizi Bajor =

Hungarian actress (1893–1951)

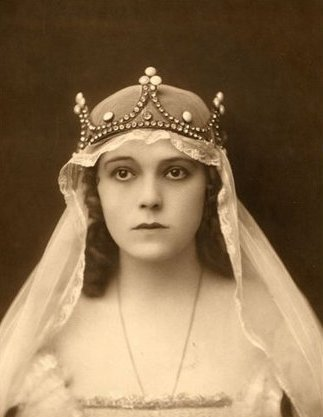
- Bajor in 1922
- Born: Gizella Beyer; 18 May 1893; Budapest, Hungary
- Died: 12 February 1951 (aged 57); Budapest, Hungary
- Other name: Gizi Bayor
- Occupation: Actress

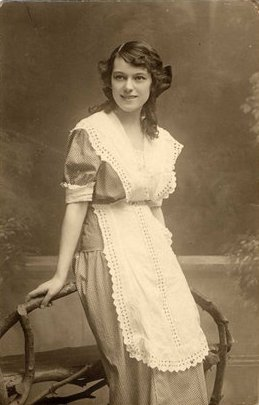
Annuska – Gizi Bajor

Gizi Bajor, or Gizi Bayor (born Gizella Beyer; 18 May 1893 – 12 February 1951) was a Hungarian actress.

== Life ==
Gizi Bajor born on 18 May 1893, in Budapest. Her father, a former mining engineer, and her mother of Italian ancestry were operating Café Báthory on the Kálvin Square, where Bajor first met the nightlife of the city, her later audience. After studying in a girls' school operated by nuns of Institutum Beatae Mariae Virginis, she completed the Academy of Drama in Budapest between 1911 and 1914. Praised by teachers and critics, she was allowed to join the National Theatre immediately after the academy, where she (except for the 1924–25 season, joining the Magyar theatre) remained until her death.

During World War II, she hid deserted soldiers and families in her resort, including her later third husband, prof. Tibor Germán.

In 1951, the mentally ill Tibor Germán, fearing that his wife was threatened by various diseases, killed Gizi Bajor and himself.

== Theater roles ==
- Annuska (Géza Gárdonyi)
- Erzsébet (Sándor Bródy: A dada)
- Juliet (Shakespeare: Romeo and Juliet)
- Titania (Shakespeare: A Midsummer Night's Dream)
- Minna (Gotthold Ephraim Lessing: Minna von Barnhelm)
- Anna (Niccodemi: Hajnalban, délben, este)
- Leila (Ernő Szép: Azra)
- Zília (Jenő Heltai: A néma levente)
- Cecile (Ferenc Herczegh: Kék róka)
- Donna Diána (Moreto)
- Marguerite Gauthier (Alexandre Dumas: Lady of the Camellias)
- Cleopatra (Shakespeare: Anthony and Cleopatra)
- Diana (Lope de Vega: The Gardener's Dog)
- Anna (Tolsztoj–Volkov: Karenina Anna)
- Lady Milford (Friedrich Schiller: Intrigue and Love)

== Legacy ==
Gizi Bajor is regarded as being one of the most influential Hungarian actors in the 20th century. She was committed to the National Theatre's Hall of fame in 1925, and she was one of the first to receive the prestigious Kossuth Prize in 1948. Her former resort is now home to the Bajor Gizi Színészmúzeum, an actor's museum.

== Sources ==
- - Gizi Bajor in the Hungarian Theatrical Lexicon (György, Székely. Magyar Színházművészeti Lexikon. Budapest: Akadémiai Kiadó, 1994. ISBN 978-963-05-6635-3), freely available on mek.oszk.hu
