= René Gardi =

Swiss travel writer, photographer and filmmaker (1909–2000)

René Gardi (1 March 1909 – 9 March 2000) was a Swiss traveller and author. He wrote particularly on the handicrafts and architecture of West Africa.

== Life ==
Gardi was born 1909 in Bern, Switzerland. After studying mathematics, physics, and zoology at Bern University, he became secondary scholl teacher at Brügg BE near Biel from 1931 to 1945, and then worked as independent author and traveler (Vortragsreisender). He documented his travels to Africa in several books and in two films:

- Mandara (1959) and
- Die letzte Karawane (The Last Caravan) (1967).

== Honors and awards ==
He won many prizes for literature and in 1967 received an Honorary Doctorate at Bern University.

== Death ==
Gardi died 2000 in Bern.

== Publications ==
- Schwarzwasser, Jugendbuch 1943
- Bergvolk der Wüste, 1951
- Blaue Schleier - rote Zelte, 1951
- Mandara, 1953
- Kirdi, 1955
- Sepik, 1958
- Sahara, 1967
