= Jean Dasque =

French film director

- Born: June 9, 1919; Paris, France
- Died: June 28, 2013 (aged 94); Oraison, France
- Occupation: Film director
- Years active: 1950–present
- Spouse: Florence Dasque (1969–present)

Jean Dasque (9 June 1919 – 28 June 2013) was a French film director, active between 1960 and 1984.

== Filmography ==
- Cinesumac
- Ballon Vole (1960)
- Die Johos (1966)
- Ohrid Express (1965)
- Le Viol (1973)
