= Big Read (Hungarian) =

Big Read is the Hungarian version of the BBC Big Read.

The Big Read was imported into Hungary under the name A Nagy Könyv (lit. "The Big Book") and took place in 2005. Around 1400 libraries, 500 book shops and 1300 schools participated in the competition in various ways. It proved to be far more popular in Hungary (with a population of 10 million) than in the UK (with a population of 60 million), with 400,000 votes arriving (as opposed to 140,000 votes in the UK competition in the corresponding period).

Voting for the top 100 began in late February: one was allowed to vote for any novel published in Hungarian. It ended on April 23, when the 50 "foreign" and 50 Hungarian most popular novels were selected.

On June 11, the top 12 novels were chosen in the framework of a television show presented by cultural celebrities. In the next months, 12 short films were made from these novels and screened in television, which competed with each other in pairs.

On December 15, the population selected their ultimate favourite by SMS and phone. The winning novel, which received the title "the most liked novel of Hungary 2005", was the same book as the result of the previous round, Eclipse of the Crescent Moon. The other two Hungarian books that participated in the final were The Paul Street Boys and Abigél.

== Initial Top 12 ==
1. Eclipse of the Crescent Moon (literally Stars of Eger) by Géza Gárdonyi
2. The Paul Street Boys by Ferenc Molnár
3. The Lord of the Rings by J. R. R. Tolkien
4. Winnie-the-Pooh by A. A. Milne
5. The Little Prince by Antoine de Saint-Exupéry
6. Abigél by Magda Szabó
7. Harry Potter and the Philosopher's Stone by J. K. Rowling
8. Tüskevár by István Fekete
9. Nineteen Eighty-Four by George Orwell
10. The Master and Margarita by Mikhail Bulgakov
11. The Man with the Golden Touch (Az arany ember) by Mór Jókai
12. One Hundred Years of Solitude by Gabriel García Márquez

== Final Top 100 ==
1. Eclipse of the Crescent Moon by Géza Gárdonyi
2. The Paul Street Boys by Ferenc Molnár
3. Abigél by Magda Szabó
4. Nineteen Eighty-Four by George Orwell
5. The Man with the Golden Touch (Az arany ember) by Mór Jókai
6. Winnie-the-Pooh by A. A. Milne
7. The Little Prince by Antoine de Saint-Exupéry
8. The Lord of the Rings by J. R. R. Tolkien
9. Harry Potter and the Philosopher's Stone by J. K. Rowling
10. The Master and Margarita by Mikhail Bulgakov
11. Tüskevár by István Fekete
12. One Hundred Years of Solitude by Gabriel García Márquez
13. Abel Alone by Áron Tamási
14. The Baron's Sons by Mór Jókai
15. Indul a bakterház by Sándor Rideg
16. Harry Potter and the Prisoner of Azkaban by J. K. Rowling
17. Harry Potter and the Chamber of Secrets by J. K. Rowling
18. Be Faithful Unto Death by Zsigmond Móricz
19. Vuk: The Little Fox by István Fekete
20. The Old Man and the Sea by Ernest Hemingway
21. Lottie and Lisa by Erich Kästner
22. Gone with the Wind by Margaret Mitchell
23. Les Misérables by Victor Hugo
24. The Count of Monte Cristo by Alexandre Dumas
25. A funtineli boszorkány by Albert Wass
26. Harry Potter and the Order of the Phoenix by J. K. Rowling
27. Fateless by Imre Kertész
28. The Three Musketeers by Alexandre Dumas
29. Kincskereső kisködmön by Ferenc Móra
30. Quo Vadis by Henryk Sienkiewicz
31. Give Me Back My Mountains by Albert Wass
32. Embers by Sándor Márai
33. Pansy Violet by Zsigmond Móricz
34. Crime and Punishment by Fyodor Dostoevsky
35. St. Peter's Umbrella by Kálmán Mikszáth
36. Jane Eyre by Charlotte Brontë
37. Dirty Fred the Captain by Jenő Rejtő
38. Slave of the Huns by Géza Gárdonyi
39. Wuthering Heights by Emily Brontë
40. A nap szerelmese by Sándor Dallos
41. The Red and the Black by Stendhal
42. The Catcher in the Rye by J. D. Salinger
43. Anna Édes by Dezső Kosztolányi
44. Catch-22 by Joseph Heller
45. Thistle by István Fekete
46. Lord of the Flies by William Golding
47. The 14-Carat Roadster by Jenő Rejtő
48. Aranyecset by Sándor Dallos
49. Lassie Come-Home by Eric Knight
50. Winnetou by Karl May
51. Téli berek by István Fekete
52. War and Peace by Leo Tolstoy
53. For Whom the Bell Tolls by Ernest Hemingway
54. Pride and Prejudice by Jane Austen
55. The Gold Coffin by Ferenc Móra
56. A fekete város by Kálmán Mikszáth
57. The Princess Diaries by Meg Cabot
58. Tóték by István Örkény
59. Flowers for Algernon by Daniel Keyes
60. Állítsátok meg Terézanyut! by Zsuzsa Rácz
61. The Name of the Rose by Umberto Eco
62. Robinson Crusoe by Daniel Defoe
63. Death is My Trade by Robert Merle
64. The Da Vinci Code by Dan Brown
65. East of Eden by John Steinbeck
66. The Good Soldier Švejk by Jaroslav Hašek
67. The Young Lions by Irwin Shaw
68. Kard és kasza by Albert Wass
69. The Pillars of the Earth by Ken Follett
70. Arch of Triumph by Erich Maria Remarque
71. School at the Frontier by Géza Ottlik
72. A Hungarian Nabob by Mór Jókai
73. This Above All by Eric Knight
74. Revulsion by László Németh
75. A Farewell to Arms by Ernest Hemingway
76. Anna Karenina by Leo Tolstoy
77. A Journey Round My Skull by Frigyes Karinthy
78. The Hitchhiker's Guide to the Galaxy by Douglas Adams
79. Love in the Time of Cholera by Gabriel García Márquez
80. The Book of Fathers by Miklós Vámos
81. The Pendragon Legend by Antal Szerb
82. Bezzeg az én időmben by Klára Fehér
83. Gergő és az álomfogók by Gyula Böszörményi
84. Malevil by Robert Merle
85. The Alchemist by Paulo Coelho
86. Für Elise by Magda Szabó
87. Journey by Moonlight by Antal Szerb
88. Jadwiga's Pillow by Pál Závada
89. Ida's Novel by Géza Gárdonyi
90. The Magic Mountain by Thomas Mann
91. An Old-fashioned Story by Magda Szabó
92. The Unbearable Lightness of Being by Milan Kundera
93. The Door by Magda Szabó
94. The Confessions of a Haut-Bourgeois by Sándor Márai
95. The Red Lion by Mária Szepes
96. Joseph and His Brothers by Thomas Mann
97. Ne féljetek by Anna Jókai
98. My Happy Days in Hell by György Faludy
99. PetePite by Gábor Nógrádi
100. Celestial Harmonies by Péter Esterházy

== Authors by number of novels in the Top 100 ==
- Four novels: István Fekete, J. K. Rowling, Magda Szabó
- Three novels: Géza Gárdonyi, Ernest Hemingway, Mór Jókai, Albert Wass
- Two novels: Sándor Dallos, Alexandre Dumas, Eric Knight, Thomas Mann, Sándor Márai, Gabriel García Márquez, Robert Merle, Kálmán Mikszáth, Ferenc Móra, Zsigmond Móricz, Jenő Rejtő, Antal Szerb, Leo Tolstoy

== See also ==
Contests similar to Big Read were held in other countries:

- Das große Lesen in Germany
- Голямото четене ("The Big Read") in Bulgaria
