= Horpács =

Coordinates: 48°00′N 19°08′E

- Interactive map of Horpács
- Country: Hungary
- County: Nógrád

Area
  - Total: 6.72 km^{2} (2.59 sq mi)

Population (2001)
  - Total: 206
  - Density: 30.65/km^{2} (79.4/sq mi)
- Time zone: UTC+1 (CET)
  - Summer (DST): UTC+2 (CEST)
- Postal code: 2658
- Area code: 35

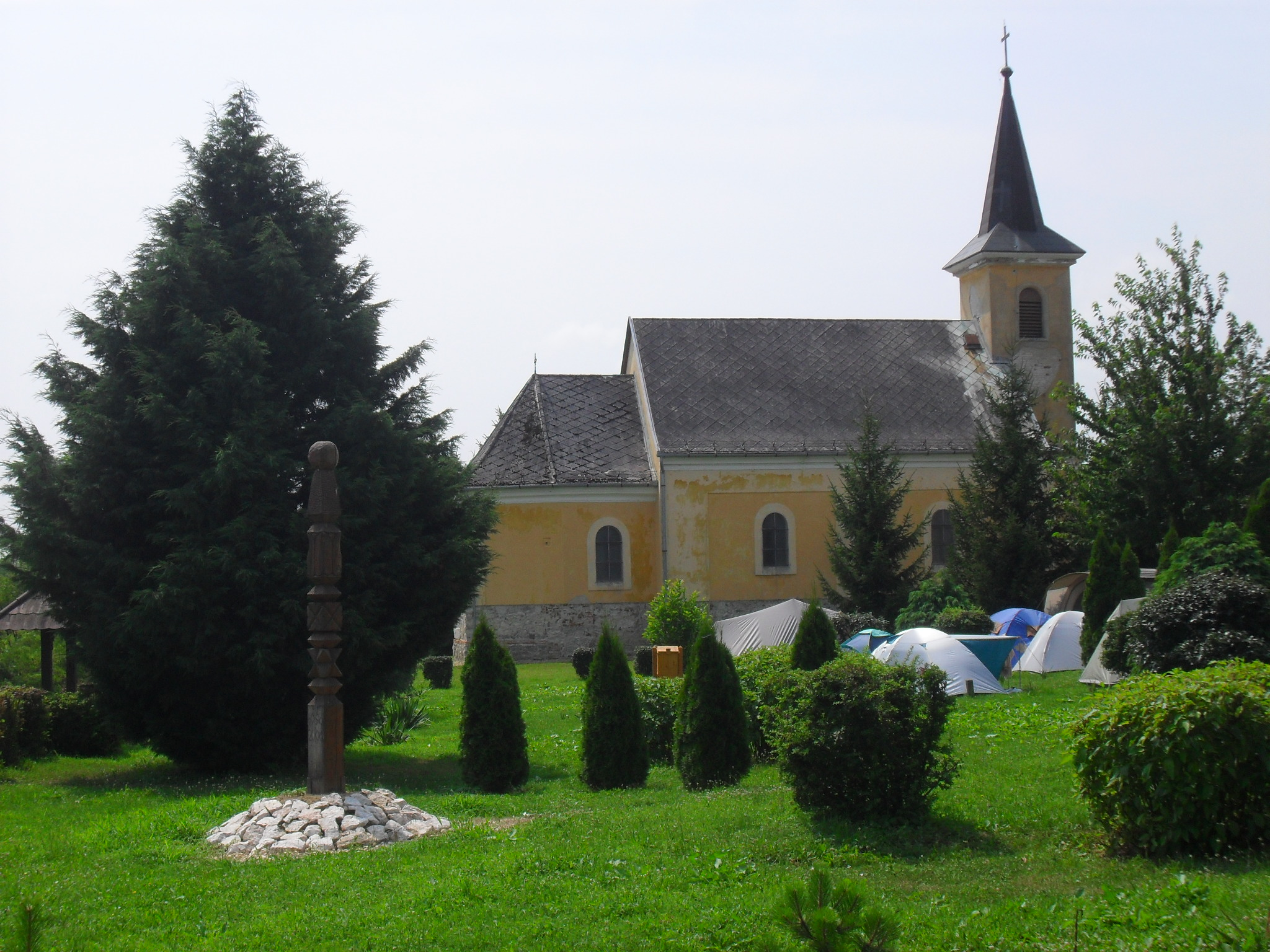
Horpács

Horpács is a village in Nógrád county, Hungary.

== Location ==
Horpács is located 67 km (42 mi) north of the capital Budapest. Leave European route E77 at Borsosberény as the closest approximation. The village is situated in a valley between gently sloping hills. It is about 15 km (9 mi) southwest of Balassagyarmat.

== History ==
The word Horpács derives from "horpad", that means "dent" in the Hungarian language, alluding to the location of village. The settlement was the property of the Szobi family in 1473, but was swapped between the Szobi and Almássy families in 1480. Big landowners later in Horpács were Stephen Paska, Samuel Veres, Paul Balogh, Ferenc Bodonyi, Joseph Gáspár, Ferenc Gelle, Joseph Somoskeöy, Ignatz Porubszky, Joseph Kovács, Denes Géczy, Dedinszky family. The Roman Catholic Church was built between 1740 and 1744.

The fact that five notable figures of Hungarian national culture came in close contact with the village in the second half of the 19th century and in the beginning of the 20th century made the settlement one of the sacred places of the Hungarian history of literature.

- Paul Szontágh (1820 Szécsény – 1904 Horpács) member of the Upper House, inner privy councillor lived in his land of Horpács from 1850 was inward friend of author of Tragedy of Man, Imre Madách. This inward friendship took great effect the Hungarian literary man, so Madách was many times visitor in Horpács. And he showed his friend every new scripts to get to know Szontágh’s opinion. Szontágh was keen supporter of Hungarian literature, one of the founders of Kisfaludy Association (supporter organization of Hungarian literature in the 19th century).
- Iván Nagy (1824 Balassagyarmat – 1898 Horpács), member of Hungarian Academy of Sciences also moved to Horpács and stayed there until his death. He was an outstanding figure of Hungarian historical science, and genealogy. The title of his main work consist of 13 books: Families of Hungary with coat of arms and genealogical plates (written between 1857 and 1868). He was good friend of Szontágh too.
- In 1904, the land of Paul Szontágh was bought by Kálmán Mikszáth (1847 Szklabonya – 1910 Budapest), the top figure of Hungarian prose literature, who wanted to come back to Nógrád county, his birthplace in the evening of his life. He said the followings:
  "I've roamed many places, after all I like Nógrád the best with her hills, valleys, woods growth straight, I see here the grass greener, flavour of flowers sweeter, than anywhere else in the world. Even the cloud passing above us seems to dress in pink here. This is my very homeland." Another recitation of his shows his humour: "People have a drink when a Hungarian is born, people have a drink as well when a Hungarian passes away, why would he be sober between the two occasions?"
- Mikszáth's friend, the famous Hungarian painter, Gyula Benczúr (1844 Nyíregyháza – 1920 Dolány /now called Benczúrfalva/) visited him in Horpács to buy an estate in his neighbourhood, but things worked out like another way.

== Sights ==
- The Kálmán Mikszáth Memorial House in the Mikszáth mansion is located by the Szontágh mansion in a park in the middle of the village
