= St. Peter's Umbrella =

St. Peter's Umbrella (Hungarian: Szent Péter esernyöje) may refer to:

- St. Peter's Umbrella (novel), an 1895 novel by the Hungarian writer Kálmán Mikszáth
- St. Peter's Umbrella (1917 film), a silent Hungarian film directed by Alexander Korda
- St. Peter's Umbrella (1935 film), a Hungarian film directed by Géza von Cziffra
- St. Peter's Umbrella (1958 film), a Czech-Hungarian film directed by Frigyes Bán and Vladislav Pavlovic
