= Len Rix =

Zimbabwe-born translator of Hungarian literature into English

Len Rix is a Zimbabwe-born translator of Hungarian literature into English, noted for his translations of Antal Szerb's Journey by Moonlight and The Pendragon Legend and of Magda Szabó's The Door and Katalin Street.

== Early life and education ==
Len Rix was born in Zimbabwe in 1942, where he studied English, French and Latin at the (then) University College of Rhodesia and Nyasaland. In 1963 he won a Commonwealth Scholarship to King's College, Cambridge, where he read English. He worked as a lecturer at the University of Rhodesia/Zimbabwe and subsequently as a teacher of English at Manchester Grammar School (where he was also Head of Careers), before retiring in 2005 to live in Cambridge. Rix learned Hungarian on his own, using textbooks, audio recordings and literature.

== Translations ==
Len Rix's first published translation from Hungarian was of Tamás Kabdebó's Minden idők (A Time for Everything) (Cardinal Press, 1995), but he is best known for his renderings of Antal Szerb, especially Journey by Moonlight (Utas és holdvilág, 1937), and of Magda Szabó's The Door (Az ajtó, 1987) and Katalin Street (Katalin utca, 1969).

== Awards and honors ==
- 2006 Independent Foreign Fiction Prize (short-listed) for the translation of Magda Szabó's The Door
- 2006 Oxford-Weidenfeld Translation Prize winner, for the translation of Magda Szabó's The Door
- 2015 New York Times Book Review 10 Best Books of 2015, for Magda Szabó's The Door
- 2018 PEN Translation Prize, winner, for the translation of Katalin Street by Magda Szabó
- 2019 Warwick Prize for Women in Translation (short-listed) for the translation of Magda Szabó's Katalin Street
- 2020 Hyman Wingate Prize for Writing about Jewry, long-listed for Magda Szabó's Katalin Street
- 2020 Warwick Prize for Women in Translation (short-listed) for the translation of Magda Szabó's Abigail
- 2021 Hungarian Gold Cross of Merit (Magyar Köztársasági Arany Érdemkereszt - Polgári) for his work in translating Hungarian literary classics into the English language

== Bibliography ==
=== Literary works translated from Hungarian ===
- A Time for Everything (Minden idők), by Tamás Kabdebó), Cardinal Press, 1995
- Journey by Moonlight (Utas és holdvilág), by Antal Szerb), Pushkin Press, 2001
- The Door (Az ajtó), by Magda Szabó), Harvill Secker, 2005
- The Pendragon Legend (A Pendragon legenda), by Antal Szerb), Pushkin Press, 2006
- Oliver VII (VII. Olivér), by Antal Szerb, Pushkin Press, 2007
- The Queen's Necklace (A királynő nyaklánca), by Antal Szerb), Pushkin Press, 2009
- Love in a Bottle (Szerelem a palackban), by Antal Szerb, Pushkin Press, 2010
- The Third Tower (A harmadik torony), by Antal Szerb, Pushkin Press, 2014
- A Martian's Guide to Budapest (Budapesti kalauz marslakók számára), by Antal Szerb, Magvető, 2015
- Katalin Street (Katalin utca), by Magda Szabó, NYRB Classics, 2017
- Abigail (Abigél), by Magda Szabó, NYRB Classics, 2020
- The Enchanted Night, Transylvanian and other Tales, by Miklós Bánffy, Pushkin Press, 2020
- The Fawn, by Magda Szabó, MacLehose Press, 2023

=== Other translations ===
- In the Footsteps of the Gods (from the early journalism of Sándor Márai),The Hungarian Quarterly No. 185, Spring 2007

=== Other publications ===
- "Shakespeare's Meaning in 'The Merchant of Venice'", University of Rhodesia 'Studies in Literature' Series, No 7, 1974
- "Charles Mungoshi's 'The Coming of the Dry Season'", Mambo Review of Contemporary African Literature, November 1974
- "Some Recent Criticism of Doris Lessing", Zambezia, Vol. 4, No. 2, 1977
- The Selected Works of Arthur Shearly Cripps, Mambo Press, 1976 (co-editor, responsible for Introduction and Bibliography)
- Rhodesian Literature in English: A Bibliography (with Pichanik et al.), Mambo Press, 1977
- "The Subtle Art of Antal Szerb", The Hungarian Quarterly, No. 186, Summer 2007
- "Magda Szabó: Acclaimed author of 'The Door'" (obituary), The Independent, November 2007
- "In Praise of Translation", The Hungarian Quarterly, No. 193, Spring 2009

=== Poetry ===
- Anthologised in Rhodesian Poetry Nos 11 (1972-3), 12 (1975) and 13 (1976-7)
- Anthologised in 25 Years of South African Poetry, New Coin, Grahamstown, 1980
- Individual poems in Two Tone (Rhodesia), New Coin (South Africa), Staple, Iota,The Interpreter's House (UK), and The New Hungarian Quarterly (Hungary)

=== Film ===
- The Door (2005), translation used for English version of 2012 film The Door by István Szabó, starring Helen Mirren
- Evolution (2021), English language translation of script by Kata Wéber and Kornél Mundruczó
