= Károly Kerényi =

Hungarian scholar (1897–1973)

Károly Kerényi (Hungarian: Kerényi Károly, pronounced [ˈkɛreːɲi ˈkaːroj]; 19 January 1897 – 14 April 1973), also known as Karl Kerényi, Carl Kerényi, Charles Kerényi and Carlo Kerényi (aliases under which his works were sometimes published, respectively in German, English, French and Italian), was a Hungarian scholar in classical philology and one of the founders of modern studies of Greek mythology.

== Life ==
=== Hungary, 1897–1943 ===
Kerényi was born in Temesvár, Kingdom of Hungary, Austro-Hungarian Empire (now Timișoara, Romania), to Hungarian parents of partly German origin. His father's family was of Swabian peasant descent. His mother was Karolina Halász.

Kerényi learnt German as a foreign language at school, and later chose it as his language for scientific work. He identified himself with the city of Arad, where he attended secondary school, because of its liberal spirits as the city of the 13 martyrs of the Hungarian Revolution of 1848/49. He moved on to study classical philology at the University of Budapest where he mostly appreciated the teaching of the Latinist Géza Némethy as well as of the Indo-Germanist Josef Schmidt. After graduation, he travelled extensively in the Mediterranean region and spent time as a visiting student at the Universities of Greifswald, Berlin and Heidelberg, learning from the professors of antiquity and classical philology: Eduard Norden, Ulrich von Wilamowitz-Moellendorff and Franz Boll. In 1919, Kerényi earned his doctorate in Budapest with a dissertation on Plato and Longinus, Investigations in Classical Literary and Aesthetic History.

Subsequently, he taught Greek and Latin in a secondary school. He earned his postdoctoral lecture qualification (habilitation) in 1927, and was asked in 1934 to become a professor of classical philology and ancient history (Griechische und Lateinische Philologie und Alte Geschichte) at the University of Pécs. In Budapest, he continued to lecture as private docent on the history of religions, classical literature and mythology. These were weekly events that were attended by many intellectuals because of their liberal connotations.

After Hungary experienced a strong move to the political right in 1940, the University system was reformed, submitting itself to political pressure. Professors who did not subordinate themselves were concentrated at the University of Szeged. Correspondingly, Kerényi was sent there in 1941 against his will, to teach classical antiquity.

The liberal, pro-western prime minister Miklós Kállay attempted in 1943 to reverse the Nazi-friendly politics of the prior years. He started to send liberal scientists who had already made themselves a name to Western Europe, to show that a liberal, anti-fascist Hungary also existed. As part of this push, the foreign ministry offered Kerényi the opportunity to spend a year in Switzerland with diplomatic status. He accepted on condition that he would stay in Ticino, on the shore of Lago Maggiore, instead of the capital Bern.

When the Germans entered Hungary in 1944 and installed a right-wing government, Kerényi returned his passport. Like many other Hungarians at the time residing in Switzerland with diplomatic status, he thereby became overnight a stateless, political refugee.

=== Switzerland, 1943–1973 ===
Since 1941, Károly Kerényi was lecturing at the Eranos-conferences in Ascona (Switzerland), to which he had been invited by Carl Gustav Jung. This regular contact with the Swiss psychologist had originally established the connection to Switzerland, which ultimately led to the permanent emigration to the Italian-speaking canton of Ticino. During 1946/47 Kerényi lectured on Hungarian language and literature at the University of Basel. In 1947, he travelled to Hungary to give his inauguration speech at the Hungarian Academy of Sciences, with the intent of contributing to the democratic development of Hungary. However, due to warnings of the imminent communist overthrow under Mátyás Rákosi, Kerényi immediately left Budapest again. During the following Stalinist dictatorship, he was discredited and banned by the political propaganda under György Lukács, the leading communist ideologist. His academic title was withdrawn and only as late as 1989 it was reinstated post mortem.

In Switzerland, between 1945 and 1968, the substantial body of his work was written and published. Despite the fact that he was considered an academic outsider, it was during that time that he developed his largest influence as one of the latest representatives of the great tradition of humanistic scholars of antiquity. Over the course of two decades, from 1934 to 1955, Kerényi maintained an active correspondence with the German writer Thomas Mann on many topics, including mythology, religion, humanism and psychology. Since his emigration, Kerényi additionally held positions as visiting professor at several universities, including Bonn (1955/56), Oslo and Rome (1960), Zurich (1961) and Genoa (1964). Between 1960 and 1971, he held annual lectures at conferences of the institute of philosophy of the University of Rome. From 1948 until 1966, Kerényi was co-founder and research director at the C. G. Jung Institute in Küsnacht, near Zurich, where he held lectures on mythology until 1962. During these years, he lived near the Monte Verità in Ascona. In 1962, he received Swiss citizenship.

Károly Kerényi died on 14 April 1973 in Kilchberg/Zurich and he is buried in the cemetery of Ascona. His second wife, Magda Kerényi, dedicated her subsequent life to the maintenance and promotion of Kerényi's legacy. Since her death in 2004, all documentation of Kerényi's life (photos, correspondence, manuscripts, etc.) that had not been destroyed in Budapest during the war, are archived and accessible at the German Archive for Literature in Marbach (near Stuttgart). His comprehensive library and the estate of Magda Kerényi are at the University of Pécs, where a street has also been named after him.

== Scientific work and philosophical body of thought ==
=== Philological foundation ===
In early years, Károly Kerényi was mainly influenced by philosophers like Schopenhauer, Bachofen and Nietzsche, writers like Hölderlin and Rilke, and scholars like Wilhelm von Humboldt. At the time of his studies of classical philology, Ulrich von Wilamowitz-Moellendorff was the most influential philologist. However, for Kerényi, Erwin Rohde's line of thought on the fictional literature in antiquity was more important. This led to his first book Die griechisch-orientalische Romanliteratur in religionsgeschichtlicher Beleuchtung. Ein Versuch (The Greek-Oriental Romances in the Light of the History of Religions), with which he earned his postdoctoral qualification.

Early afterwards, in 1929, Kerényi grew weary of the official scholarly line of philology. He increasingly saw the objective of philology in critically analyzing the written record of antiquity as a representation of real life, just like archeology is dedicated to the record of antiquity through actual touch. The first steps away from the official line were his early books Apollon (a collection of essays) and Die antike Religion (Religion in Antiquity). Throughout his life, Kerényi explored every classical site of the entire Mediterranean. In 1929, he met Walter F. Otto in Greece for the first time, who would prove to influence him greatly. Otto inspired Kerényi to focus on the religious element of human life in antiquity as the core element, thereby combining the historical with the theological focus. This is highlighted in his works Mythologie der Griechen and Mysterien der Eleusis (Eleusis: Archetypal Image of Mother and Daughter).

=== Dissociation from Wilamowitz and the German idea of myth ===
Thereafter, Károly Kerényi consciously started to distance himself from the philology taught by Wilamowitz. In Kerényi's understanding, Wilamowitz's approach stood for an authoritarianism that lay beneath the emergence of National Socialism in Germany, which he could not ethically support. Kerényi hence developed an increasingly hostile position towards the German idea of myth, which was used as reference by Nazi-Germany. As early as 1934, he expressed his clear-sighted horror at the radicalizing developments in Germany. It became a continuous objective of Kerényi to establish a liberal and human-psychological idea of myth that could not be abused for nationalistic ideology. This also influenced his position towards several of his scientific mentors. With regard to Wilamowitz, this was most pronounced, but later, Kerényi also started to distance himself from those aspects in Otto's and Mann's understanding of myth that he saw reflected in German nationalism.

=== Psychological expansion of mythology ===
Károly Kerényi's scientific interpretation of the figures of Greek mythology as archetypes of the human soul was in line with the approach of the Swiss psychologist Carl Gustav Jung. Together with Jung, he endeavored to establish mythology as a science in its own right. Jung described Kerényi as having "supplied such a wealth of connections [of psychology] with Greek mythology that the cross-fertilization of the two branches of science can no longer be doubted." Kerényi compiled in collaboration with Jung the two editions Das göttliche Kind in mythologischer und psychologischer Beleuchtung (The Myths of the Divine Child) and Das göttliche Mädchen (The Divine Maiden), which were published together under the title Einführung in das Wesen der Mythologie (Essays on a Science of Mythology) in 1941. Kerényi saw the theory of religion as a human and humanistic topic which coined his reputation as humanist further. For him, every view of mythology had to be a view of man—and hence theology always had to be at the same time, anthropology. In this humanist spirit, Kerényi defined himself as philological-historical as well as psychological scholar. In later years, Kerényi evolved his psychological interpretation further and replaced the concept of archetypes with one that he labeled 'Urbild'. This became particularly clear in some of his most important publications: Prometheus, as well as in Dionysos, likely Kerényi's most crucial work, which he had started as an idea in 1931 and finished writing in 1969. Kerényi hence looked at the appearances in Greek religion not as curiosities, but as expressions of real human experience. As a historian of myth as it was embedded in the details of Hellenic culture, its "characteristic social existence" as he put it, Kerényi opposed his "differentiated thinking about the concrete realities of human life" with the "summary thinking" that represented for him the influence of Sir James Frazer on the study of the peoples of antiquity and Greek religion especially.

=== Kerényi as cultural anthropologist ===
Not least as a result of his own personal experience, Károly Kerényi highlighted the role of the philologist as interpreter, whereby "the better he interprets, the more he becomes himself the subject, both as receiver as well as messenger. His whole essence and being, his structure and his own experiences, become a factor that cannot be overlooked for interpretation.” In this sense, Kerényi's understanding of science was very modern in 1944. In a time when human sciences were trying to establish themselves as objective-scientific, he recognized that the only means by which to achieve scientific objectivity was by disclosing each scholar's own individual subjectivity. Kerényi also anticipated a paradigm shift of the late 20th century, by subscribing to an interdisciplinary approach that combined the subjects of human sciences including literature, art, history, philosophy and religion. The inclusion of fictional writing into his studies of mythology and humanism is also documented by the publications of his correspondence with Thomas Mann and Hermann Hesse. Kerényi published a further series of thoughts on European humanism in 1955 with the title Geistiger Weg Europas (Europe's Intellectual Journey). Among the numerous personalities with whom Kerényi maintained important personal and scholarly interaction were the Hungarian poets László Németh, Antal Szerb and Pál Gulyás, the psychologist Léopold Szondi, the writer Otto Heuschele and the historian Carl Jacob Burckhardt. Thanks to his essay-style, Kerényi managed to speak a language that was easily understandable, but it also meant he remained relatively isolated in academic philology.

In Hungary, Károly Kerényi's scientific achievements remained during his lifetime only known to a small circle of intellectuals. Of all his publications, only few have been published in Hungarian. As a prominent member of the former Hungarian intellectual establishment and the bearer of an aristocratic name, he was banished from Hungarian cultural life since the 1940s for being too liberal, first by the right-wing pro-Nazi governments, and later by the communist regime. Even though Kerényi was fiercely defended by famous Hungarian writers like Laszlo Németh and Antal Szerb, it took until the 1980s before his complete moral and scholarly rehabilitation took place. The Hungarian writer Antal Szerb has modeled some features of Károly Kerényi into the figure Rudi Waldheim in his novel Journey by Moonlight.

== Honors and awards ==
- 1929: Scholarship at the German Archeological Institute in Athens
- 1931: Medal of Honor of George I of Greece
- 1946: Baumgarten Prize
- 1947: Fellowship of the Bollingen Foundation (maintained until 1973)
- 1961: Member of the Royal Norwegian Society of Sciences and Letters
- 1963: Honorary doctorate of the Theological Faculty of the University of Uppsala
- 1969: Gold medal of the Humboldt Society
- 1970: Pirckheimer-Ring of the City of Nuremberg
- 1989: Post mortem: Member of the Hungarian Academy of Sciences
- 1990: Széchenyi Prize of the Hungarian Government

== Works and publications ==
First editions:

- Apollon. Studien über antike Religion und Humanität (Apollo: The Wind, the Spirit, and the God) (1937)
- Das ägäische Fest. Die Meergötterszene in Goethes Faust II (1941)
- Der Mythos der Hellenen in Meisterwerken der Münzkunst (1941)
- Einführung in das Wesen der Mythologie (C. G. Jung/Károly Kerényi) (1942)
- Pseudo-Antisthenés, beszélgetések a szerelemről (1943)
- Hermes, der Seelenführer (Hermes: Guide of Souls) (1943)
- Mysterien der Kabiren (1944)
- Töchter der Sonne, Betrachtungen über griechische Gottheiten (Goddesses of Sun and Moon) (1944)
- Bachofen und die Zukunft des Humanismus. Mit einem Intermezzo über Nietzsche und Ariadne (1945)
- Die Geburt der Helena samt humanistischen Schriften aus den Jahren 1943–45 (1945)
- Prometheus. Das griechische Mythologem von der menschlichen Existenz (Prometheus: Archetypal Image of Human Existence) (1946)
- Der Göttliche Arzt. Studien über Asklepius und seine Kultstätte (Asklepios: Archetypal Image of the Physician's Existence) (1948)
- Niobe. Neue Studien über Antike Religion und Humanität (1949)
- Mensch und Maske (1949)
- Pythagoras und Orpheus. Präludien zu einer zukünftigen Geschichte der Orphik und des Pythagoreismus (1950)
- Labyrinth-Studien (1950)
- Die Mythologie der Griechen (The Mythology of the Greeks)
  - Volume 1: Die Götter- und Menschheitsgeschichten (Gods of the Greeks) (1951)
  - Volume 2: Die Heroen der Griechen (The Heroes of the Greeks) [later also published as Heroengeschichten or Heroen-Geschichten] (1958)
- Die Jungfrau und Mutter der griechischen Religion. Eine Studie über Pallas Athene (Athene: Virgin and Mother in Greek Religion) (1952)
- Stunden in Griechenland, Horai Hellenikai (1952)
- Unwillkürliche Kunstreisen. Fahrten im alten Europa 1952 (1954)
- Geistiger Weg Europas: Fünf Vorträge über Freud, Jung, Heidegger, Thomas Mann, Hofmannsthal, Rilke, Homer und Hölderlin, Zürich (1955)
- Umgang mit Göttlichem (1955)
- Griechische Miniaturen (1957)
- Gespräch in Briefen (Mythology and Humanism: The Correspondence of Thomas Mann and Karl Kerényi) (Thomas Mann/Károly Kerényi) (1960)
- Streifzüge eines Hellenisten, Von Homer zu Kazantzakis (1960)
- Der frühe Dionysos (1961)
- Prometheus – Die menschliche Existenz in griechischer Deutung (1962)
- Die Mysterien von Eleusis (Eleusis: Archetypal Image of Mother and Daughter) (1962)
- Tessiner Schreibtisch (1963)
- Die Religion der Griechen und Römer (The Religion of the Greeks and Romans) (1963)
- Die Eröffnung des Zugangs zum Mythos (1967)
- Der antike Roman (1971)
- Briefwechsel aus der Nähe (Hermann Hesse/Károly Kerényi) (1972)
- Zeus und Hera. Urbild des Vaters, des Gatten und der Frau (Zeus and Hera: Archetypal Image of Father, Husband and Wife) (1972)
- Oedipus Variations: Studies in Literature and Psychoanalysis (James Hillman/Károly Kerényi) (1991)

Complete Works:

- Complete Works in Individual Volumes, Magda Kerényi (ed.). Eight parts in nine volumes. Langen-Müller, Munich 1966–1988
  - Volume 1: Humanistische Seelenforschung (1966)
  - Volume 2: Auf Spuren des Mythos (1967)
  - Volume 3: Tage- und Wanderbücher 1953–1960 (1969)
  - Volume 4: Apollon und Niobe (1980)
  - Volume 5: Wege und Weggenossen (2 Bde., 1985 u. 1988)
  - Volume 6: (not published)
  - Volume 7: Antike Religion (1971)
  - Volume 8: Dionysos : Urbild des unzerstörbaren Lebens (1976)
- Complete Works in Individual Volumes, Magda Kerényi (ed.). Five volumes. Klett-Cotta, Stuttgart 1994–1998
  - Volume 1: Dionysos : Urbild des unzerstörbaren Lebens (1994)
  - Volume 2: Antike Religion (1995)
  - Volume 3: Humanistische Seelenforschung (1996)
  - Volume 4: Die Mythologie der Griechen (Two volumes, 1997)
  - Volume 5: Urbilder der griechischen Religion: Asklepios. Prometheus. Hermes. Und die Mysterien der Kabiren (1998)

== References and sources ==
Sources

- Magda Kerényi: A Bibliography of C. Kerényi, in Dionysos: Archetypal Image of Indestructible Life. Bollingen Series LXV:2, Princeton 1976, pp. 445–474
- Giuseppe Martorana (ed.), Károly Kerényi: La storia delle religioni nella cultura del Novecento, Mythos 7, 1995
- Luciano Arcella (ed.), Károly Kerényi: Incontro con il divino, Roma 1999
- János Gy. Szilágyi (ed.): Mitológia és humanitás. Tanulmányok Kerényi Károly 100. születésnapjára, Budapest 1999
- Renate Schlesier and Roberto Sanchiño Martinez (eds.): Neuhumanismus und Anthropologie des griechischen Mythos. Karl Kerényi im europäischen Kontext des 20. Jahrhunderts (Modern Humanism and Anthropology of the Greek Mythology – Károly Kerényi in the European Context of the 20th Century). (Locarno 2006), ISBN 88-85688-08-X
