= Abigél =

Abigél may refer to:

- Abigail (name)
- Abigél (novel), by Magda Szabó
