= Sándor Dallos =

Hungarian writer

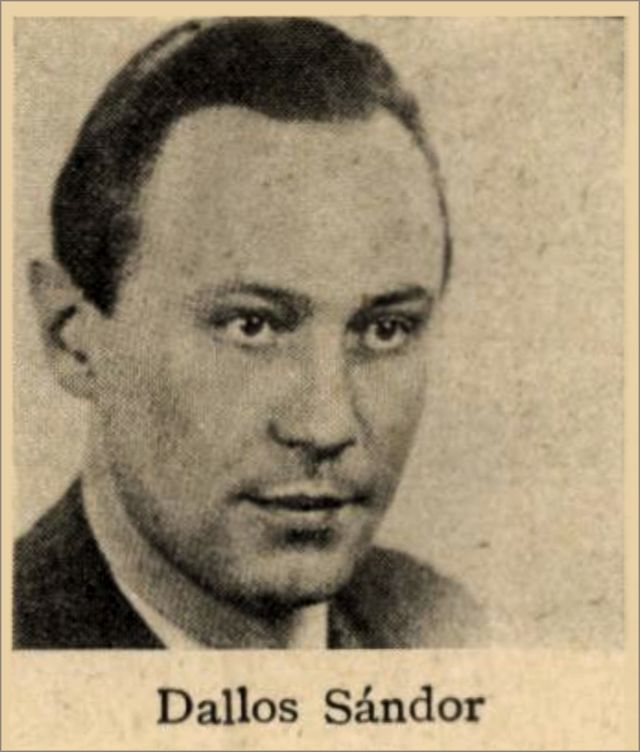
Image of Sándor Dallos

Sándor Dallos (1901-1964) was a Hungarian writer. In 1953 he received the Attila József Prize. Two of his books placed in the Top 100 of the Hungarian version of the BBC Big Read.
