= The Door (2012 film) =

2012 film

- Film poster
- Directed by: István Szabó
- Written by: István Szabó; Andrea Vészits; Magda Szabó
- Produced by: Jenő Hábermann; Sándor Söth
- Starring: Helen Mirren
- Cinematography: Elemér Ragályi
- Distributed by: Mokép
- Release date: 8 March 2012
- Running time: 97 minutes
- Country: Hungary
- Language: English

The Door (Hungarian: Az ajtó) is a 2012 English-language Hungarian drama film directed by István Szabó and starring Martina Gedeck and Helen Mirren. It is based on the Hungarian novel of the same name concerning the relationship of a novelist (Gedeck) and her eccentric maid (Mirren) in early-1970s Hungary.

The film was selected to be featured in the competition programme at the 34th Moscow International Film Festival. It also won the Michael Curtiz Audience Award at the Hungarian Film Festival of Los Angeles in November 2012.

== Cast ==
- Helen Mirren as Emerenc
- Martina Gedeck as Magda
- Károly Eperjes as Tibor
- Gábor Koncz as The Lt. Colonel
- Enikő Börcsök as Sutu
- Ági Szirtes as Polett
- Erika Marozsán as Eva "Evike" Großman
- Ildikó Tóth as Doctor
- Mari Nagy as Adél
- Péter Andorai as Mr. Brodarics

== Awards ==
- Hungarian Film Festival of Los Angeles – Michael Curtiz Audience Award: The Door (2012)
