= Borsosberény =

Coordinates: 47°58′N 19°07′E

- Interactive map of Borsosberény
- Country: Hungary
- County: Nógrád

Area
  - Total: 20.26 km^{2} (7.82 sq mi)

Population (2001)
  - Total: 1,040
  - Density: 51.33/km^{2} (132.9/sq mi)
- Time zone: UTC+1 (CET)
  - Summer (DST): UTC+2 (CEST)
- Postal code: 2644
- Area code: 35

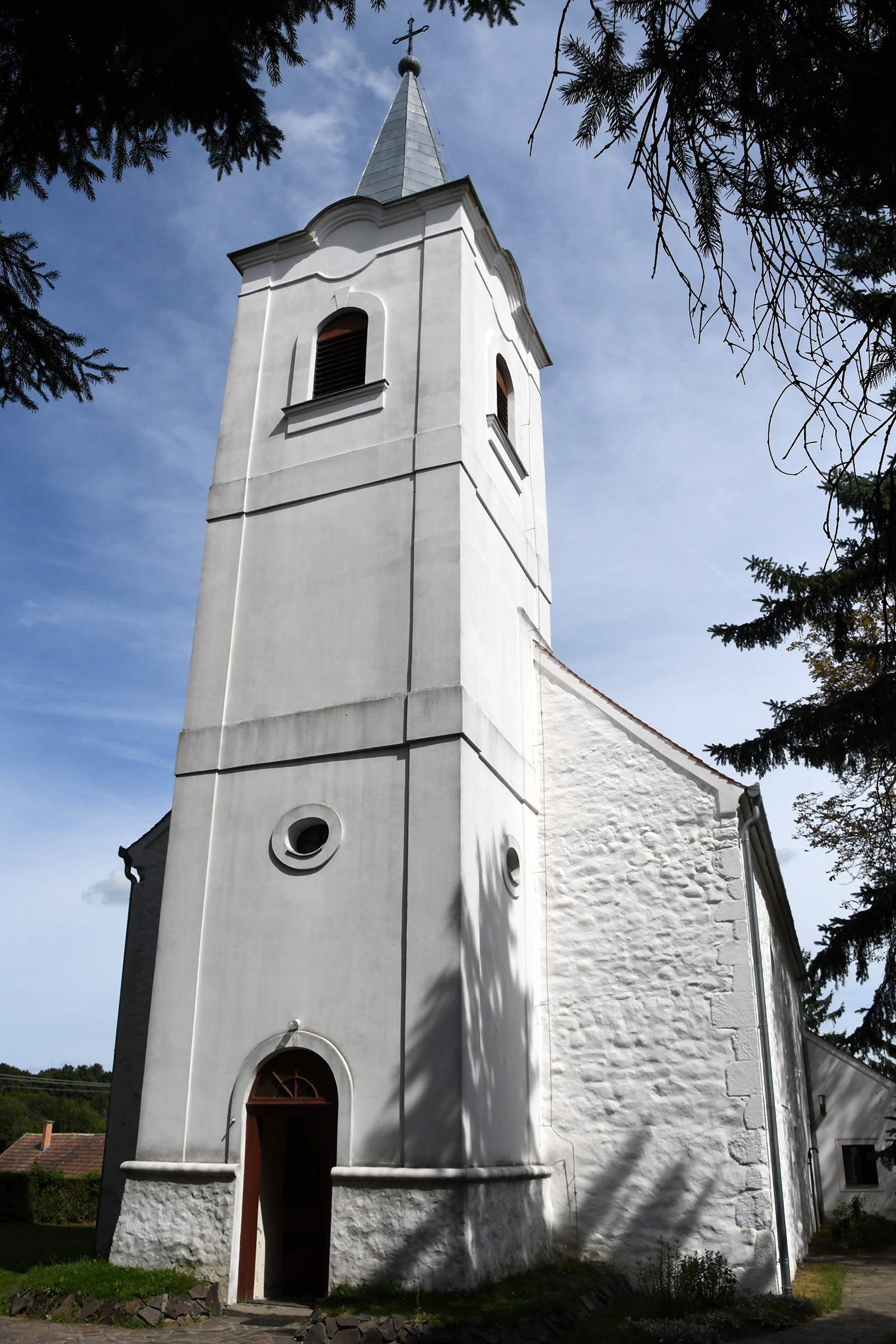

Borsosberény is a village in Nógrád county, Hungary.

== Location ==
Borsosberény is located 65 km (40 mi) north of Budapest on the European route E77. The village lies at the northeastern foot of Börzsöny hills. It is about 17 km (11 mi) southwest of Balassagyarmat.

== History ==
Outskirts of Borsosberény have been populated since the Neolithic Age. Findings from the Neolithic and the Bronze Age were discovered close to the village. The settlement was property of the Losonczy family in 1393. In 1470 King Mathias donated the village to László Madách and Gáspár Jánosy due to their brave behaviour in campaign against the Czechs. In the middle of the 16th century the Ottomans conquered Borsosberény. Some of the Turkish landowners were mentioned in Ottoman tax registers, e. g. Rizvan Divane Turkish warrior from Dregel in 1587. Borsosberény was mostly desolationed during the Ottoman occupation, its population grew significantly in the 18th century. Big landowners were later in Borsosberény: Tihanyi family since 18th century, Baloghs from Ócsa, bishopric of Vác, Bartakovich family, Gindly family from Tengelicz, and Mocsáry family at last till 1945. Kálmán Mikszáth got the land of Szomolya as a gift from the Hungarian nation on his 40th writing jubilee, so his family was landowner between 1909 and 1945.
Szomolyapuszta belongs to Borsosberény was a separate village in the Middle Ages, this is where the Johannita Order's monastery was situated in 1274. The monastery fell to the ground during centuries. During the Ottoman conquest Mahmud Bin Iltsi and later Bosna Hassan were mentioned as landowners.
Present Roman Catholic church of the village was built between 1728 and 1730. One mansion was built by Thomas Tihanyi in 1826 and would be owned by Mocsáry family later. The other mansion was built by Ágoston Bartakovich. The village got railway connection in 1909.

== Sights ==
- Roman Catholic church
- Tihanyi-Mocsáry mansion
