= St. Peter's Umbrella (1935 film) =

- Hungarian: Szent Péter esernyöje
- Directed by: Géza von Cziffra
- Written by: Iván Siklósi
- Based on: St. Peter's Umbrella by Kálmán Mikszáth
- Produced by: Mihály Körner; Pál Préger
- Starring: Marica Gervai; Lajos Básti; Pál Kalmár
- Cinematography: Lajos Berger Berend
- Music by: György Rezes; Géza Salgó-Sally
- Production company: Kolorfilm
- Release date: 14 November 1935
- Running time: 78 minutes
- Country: Hungary
- Language: Hungarian

St. Peter's Umbrella (Hungarian: Szent Péter esernyője) is a 1935 Hungarian drama film directed by Géza von Cziffra and starring Marica Gervai, Lajos Básti and Pál Kalmár. It was based on the 1895 novel St. Peter's Umbrella by Kálmán Mikszáth which had previously been adapted into a silent film in 1917.

== Cast ==
- Marica Gervai as Veronika Bényi
- Lajos Básti as György Wibra
- Pál Kalmár as György Wibra (singing voice)
- Piri Peéry as Eszmeralda Panyóki
- Lajos Boray as Berci
- Márton Rátkai as Boldizsár Gregorics
- Sándor Pethes as Gáspár Gregorics
- Béla Fáy as Glogova's priest
- Ella Gombaszögi as Blanche, the governess
- Ferike Vidor as Adameczné
- Lajos Köpeczi Boócz as Mravicsán
- Annie Réthy as Anni Mravicsán
- László Z. Molnár as notary
- Zoltán Makláry as clerk of the notary
- Zoltán Hosszú as church boy
- György Dénes as student
- László Keleti as student
- József Kishonti as student
- Erzsébet Gyöngyössy as Anna Wibra
- Irén Sitkey as teacher
- István Bársony as peasant farmer
- Gyula Justh as pipe-smoking peasant
- Lajos Gárdonyi as Münz Móric
- Gyula Köváry as Rikkancs a búcsúban
- József Bihari as man
- Lajos Gárday as Glogova's notary
