= Oliver VII =

1942 novel by Antal Szerb

- English translation book cover from 2007
- Author: Antal Szerb
- Original title: VII. Olivér
- Translator: Len Rix
- Language: Hungarian
- Publisher: Széchenyi Irodalmi és Művészeti Rt.
- Publication date: 1942
- English publication date: 2007

Oliver VII is a 1942 novel by Antal Szerb. The first English translation was published in 2007. In the book, the restless ruler of an obscure central European state plots a coup d'état against himself and escapes to Venice in search of ‘real’ experience. There he falls in with a team of con men and ends up, to his own surprise, impersonating himself. His journey through successive levels of illusion and reality teaches him much about the world, about his own nature and the paradoxes of the human condition.

Translated from the Hungarian by Zimbabwe-British translator Len Rix, ISBN 978-1-901285-79-6 and ISBN 978-1-901285-90-1 for the reprint edition.
