= St. Peter's Umbrella (1917 film) =

1917 film

- Directed by: Alexander Korda
- Written by: Kálmán Mikszáth (novel); Iván Siklósi
- Starring: Károly Lajthay; Márton Rátkai; Victor Varconi; Ica von Lenkeffy
- Cinematography: Gusztáv Mihály Kovács
- Production company: Corvin Film
- Release date: 29 October 1917
- Country: Hungary
- Languages: Silent; Hungarian intertitles

St. Peter's Umbrella (Hungarian: Szent Péter esernyöje) is a 1917 Hungarian silent drama film directed by Alexander Korda and starring Károly Lajthay, Márton Rátkai and Victor Varconi. It was an adaptation of the 1895 novel St. Peter's Umbrella by Kálmán Mikszáth. Two adaptations were made later in 1935 and in 1958.

== Cast ==
- Károly Lajthay - Vicar Bély
- Márton Rátkai
- Victor Varconi
- Ica von Lenkeffy
- Charles Puffy
- József Kürthy
- József Hajdú
- Marcsa Simon
- Gyula Bartos
- Mari K. Demjén

== Bibliography ==
- Kulik, Karol. Alexander Korda: The Man Who Could Work Miracles. Virgin Books, 1990.
