= Pál Kalmár =

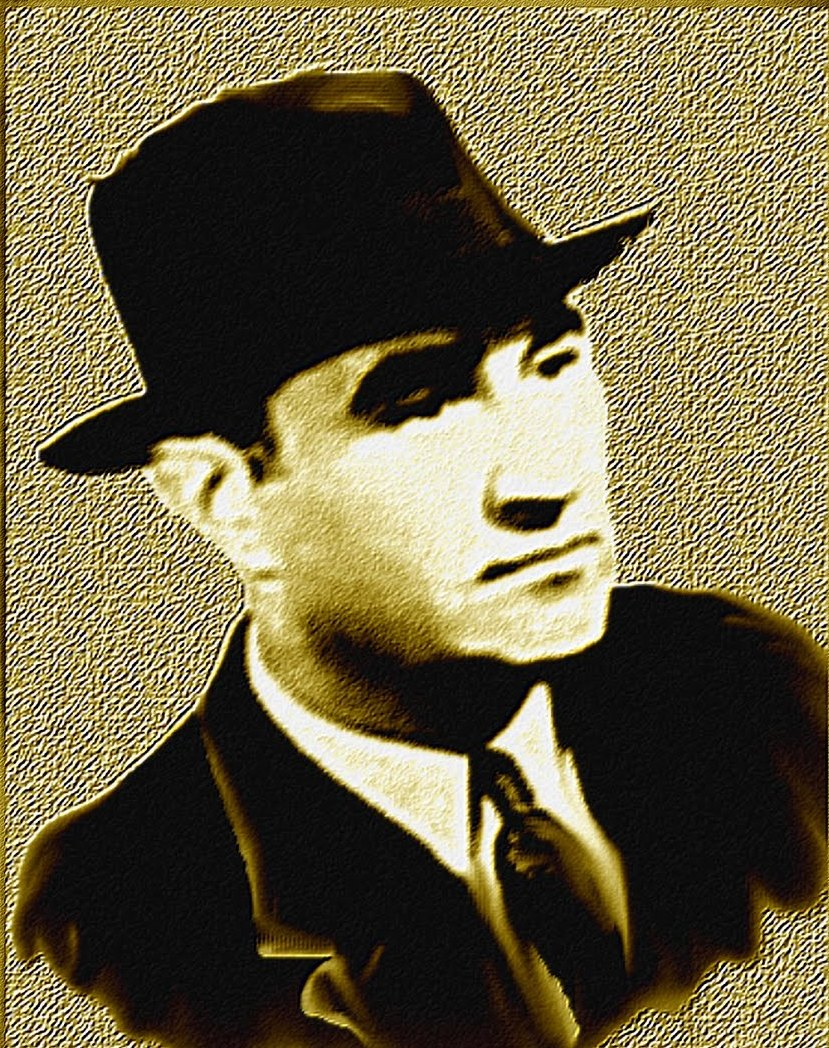

Background information
- Born: Pál Kalmár; September 5, 1900
- Origin: Budapest, Hungary
- Died: November 21, 1988 (aged 88)
- Occupation: Singer
- Years active: 1930–1960

Pál Kalmár (Hungarian: Kalmár Pál) (September 5, 1900 – November 21, 1988) was a Hungarian pop singer who is noted as being the first singer to perform "Gloomy Sunday". He was at the height of his fame in the 1930s and 1940s but continued singing into the 1960s. Pál Kalmár's musical history is also well documented in Saly Noemi's book A Tangókirály (The Tango King).

== Biography ==
Pál Kalmár was born in Budapest on September 5, 1900, his father was from Jasz-Nagykun-Szolnok county district court and his mother a descendant of the historic Czebe family. He was schooled in the Highlands and eventually obtained a military career in the Royal Hungarian Army. Later, at 19, he became part of the Hungarian comedy theater. In 1935, he worked on the film St. Peter's Umbrella. During the Second World War his career was interrupted but he resumed singing as a full-time job after the war. After a major throat operation in 1968, he permanently lost his voice.

== Discography ==
- Szomorú vasárnap/Gloomy Sunday. (Rezső Seress-László Jávor)
- Szeressük egymást gyerekek. (Seress Rezső)
- Ha minden véget ér. (Seress Rezső)
- Az egyiknek sikerül, a másiknak nem. (Béla Zerkovitz)
- Már megettem a kenyerem javát. (Dr. Sándor Jenő-Dezső Kellér)
- Drágám, néha téved az ember. (Buday Dénes-László Vadnai)
- Az nem lehet. (Kola József-Andor Szenes)
- Emlékszik még kislány? (Zách István-Cz. Nemes Gyula)
- Az ember egy léha, könnyelmű senki. (Mihály Erdélyi)
- Szívbajok ellen, kisasszony, szedjen tangót! (Rozsnyai Sándor-Imre Harmath)
- Balalajka sír az éjben. (Szabolcs Fényes-Mihály István)
- Szép vagy, gyönyörű vagy, Magyarország. (Vincze Zsigmond-Kulinyi Ernő)
- Maga az első bűnös asszony. (László Imre-Seress Rezső)

== Selected filmography ==
- St. Peter's Umbrella (1935)

== See also ==
- Hungarian pop
