= Ferenc Móra =

Hungarian novelist, journalist and museologist (1879–1934)

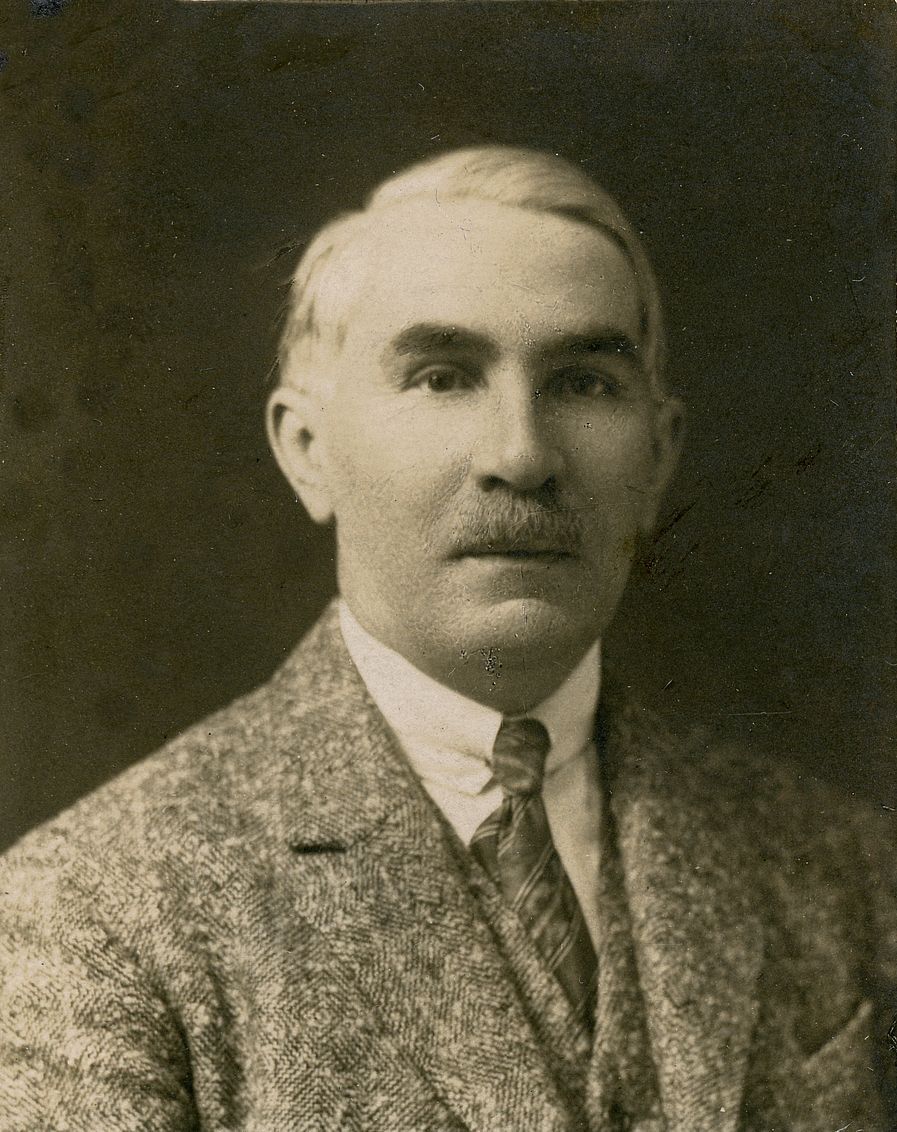
Ferenc Móra

Ferenc Móra (19 July 1879 – 8 February 1934) was a Hungarian novelist, journalist, and museologist.

== Life ==
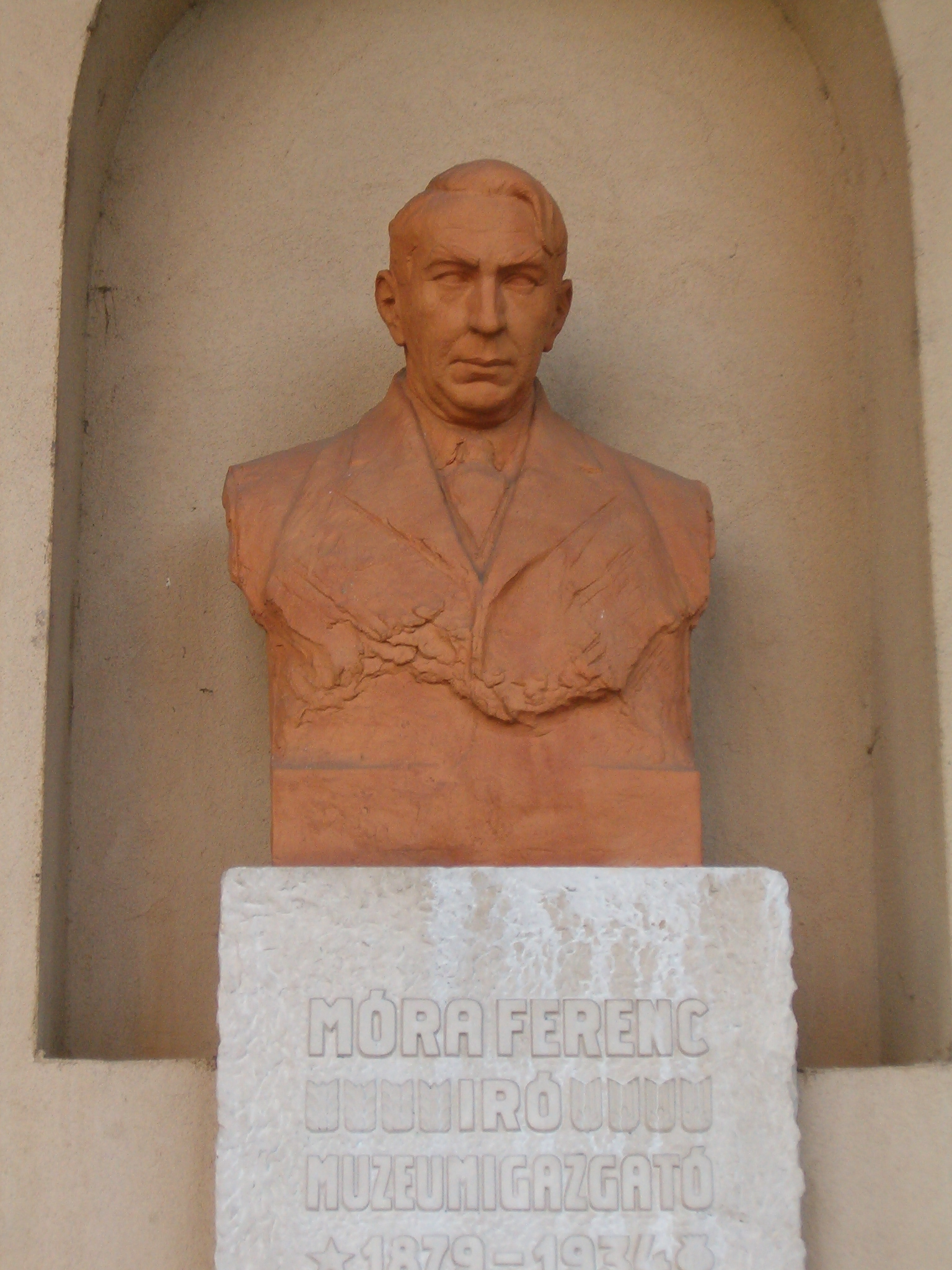
Ferenc Móra statue at the Szeged Pantheon

Ferenc Móra was born in Kiskunfélegyháza into a financially poor family. His father, Márton Móra, was a tailor, and his mother, Anna Juhász, was a baker. He acquired his formal education under the most extreme hardships because of the financial poverty of his family. At the Budapest University, he earned a degree in Geography and History education but worked as a teacher only for one year at Felsőlövő, Vas County. He was a prominent figure of youth literature in Hungary. His parallel career in museology started in 1904 at the combined library and museum of Szeged, serving the county capital of Szeged and its surrounding Csongrád County. He was appointed as the director of the combined library and museum of Szeged and Csongrád County in 1917 and served in that post as director until 1934, when he died, aged 54, at Szeged. Today, the museum is named in his honour as the "Móra Ferenc Muzeum", which can be seen on the internet at many websites.

== Major literary works ==
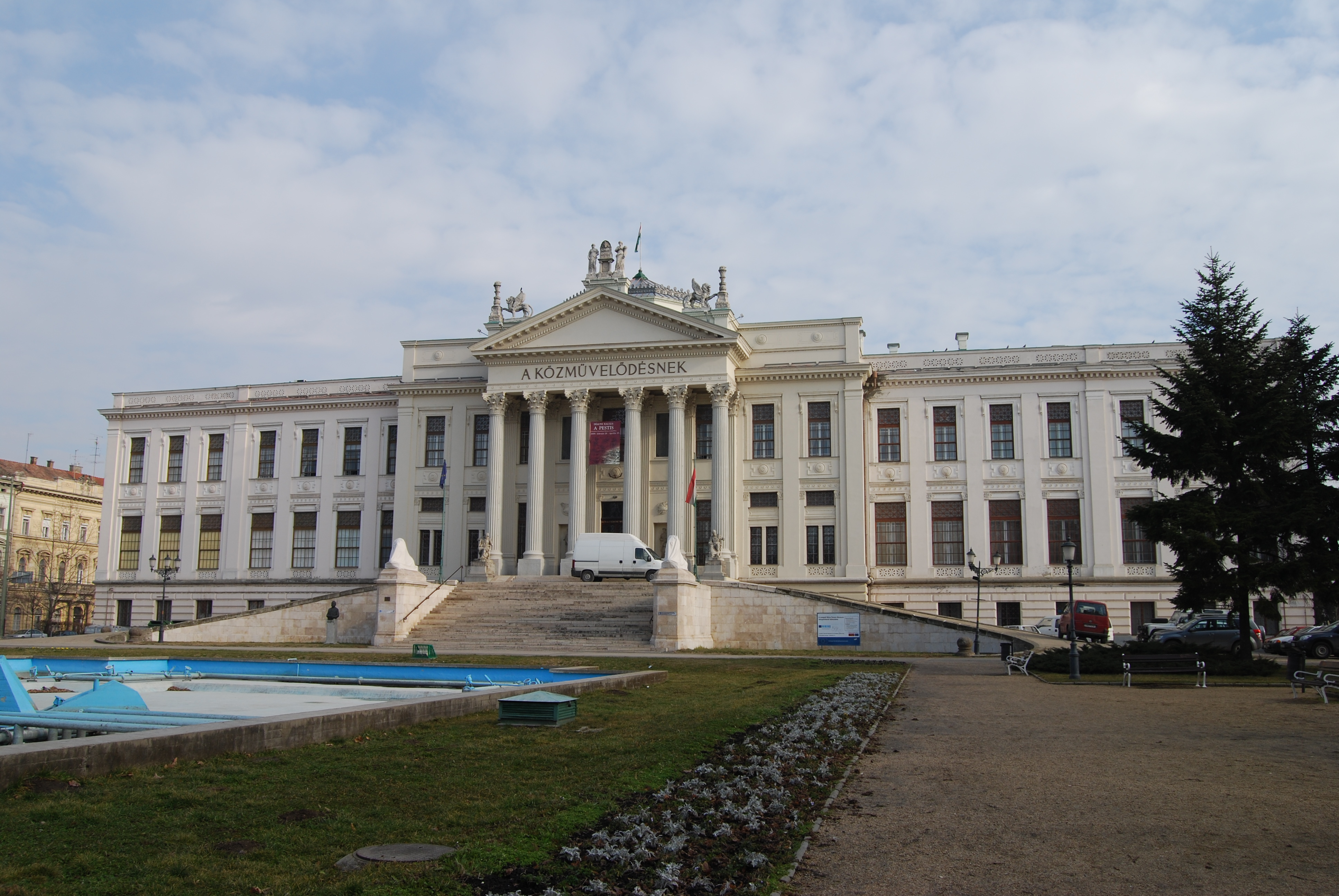
Ferenc Móra Museum in Szeged

All listed books were published in Budapest.

- Rab ember fiai "Sons of a Slave" (1909)
- Mindenki Jánoskája "Everybody's Little Johnnie" (1911)
- Csilicsali Csalavári Csalavér (1912)
- Filkó meg én "Filkó and I" (1915)
- Kincskereső kisködmön "The Treasure-seeking Little Jacket" (1918)
- Dióbél királyfi "Prince Walnutmeat" or "The Walnut-Prince" (1922)
- A festő halála "Death of the Painter" (1921), novel later published as Négy apának egy leánya "Four Fathers' One Daughter"
- Georgikon (1925)
- Nádihegedű "Reed Fiddle" (1927)
- Ének a búzamezőkről "A Song about Wheat Fields" (1927), novel
- Beszélgetés a ferdetoronnyal "Conversation with the Leaning Tower" (1927)
- Véreim "My Descendants" (1927)
- Sokféle "Diverse" (1927)
- A körtemuzsika (1927) – shorter stories, fairy tales
- Egy cár, akit várnak "A Tzar Who is Waited for" (1930)
- Aranykoporsó "Golden Coffin" (1932), historical novel
- Daru-utcától a Móra Ferenc-utcáig "From Crane Street to Móra Ferenc Street" (1934), autobiography
- Utazás a földalatti Magyarországon "A Journey in the Underground Hungary" (1935)
- Parasztjaim "My Peasants" (1935)
- Dióbél királykisasszony "Princess Walnutmeat" (1935)
- Napok, holdak, elmúlt csillagok "Suns, Moons, Bygone Stars" (1935)
