= Magda Szabó =

Hungarian novelist

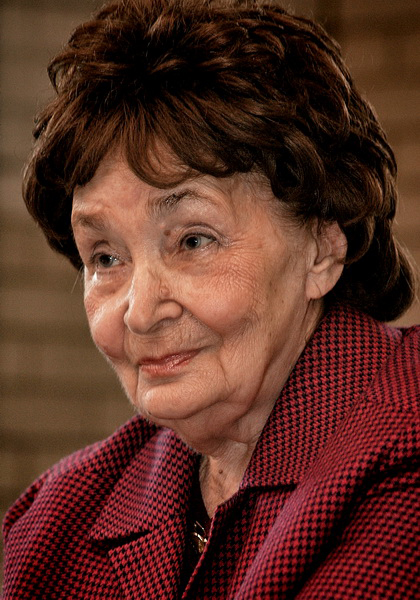
- Magda Szabó in 2005
- Born: 5 October 1917; Debrecen, Austria-Hungary
- Died: 19 November 2007 (aged 90); Kerepes, Hungary
- Education: University of Debrecen (PhD)
- Writing career
- Years active: 1947–1987

Magda Szabó (Hungarian pronunciation: [ˈmɒgdɒ ˈsɒboː] 5 October 1917 – 19 November 2007) was a Hungarian novelist. Doctor of philology, she also wrote dramas, essays, studies, memoirs, poetry and children's literature. She was a founding member of the Digital Literary Academy, an online digital repository of Hungarian literature. She is the most translated Hungarian author, with publications in 42 countries and over 30 languages.

== Biography ==
=== Early life ===
Magda Szabó was born in Debrecen, Austria-Hungary in 1917. Her father, Elek Szabó (1879–1959), an academic and public official, taught her to speak Latin fluently from childhood, gave her the foundation of her extensive knowledge of European antiquity and an appreciation of ancient Roman and Greek history and literature. Her mother, Lenke Jablonczay (1884–1967), was herself a writer, although her works were never published. The influence and example of her parents played an important part in Szabó’s life. Storytelling and playing theatre were everyday activities in her childhood, both with her parents and by herself.

Szabó graduated from secondary school in 1935 in the Dóczy Institute for Girls’ Education of Debrecen (today Dóczy Gymnasium of the Reformed College of Debrecen), where she had studied for twelve years. She studied to become a teacher of Hungarian and Latin at the István Tisza Hungarian Royal University of Science (today University of Debrecen), graduating in 1940. She rarely commented on her tertiary education, except for stating that she considered it to have been ‘conservative’ and ‘old-fashioned’, and that she received little support to develop as a writer. She wrote her thesis on cosmetic practices in ancient Rome. She referred to this as a doctoral dissertation, but literary historian Endre Bakó claims not to have found documentation of Szabó pursuing a doctorate.

=== Adulthood ===
In 1943 and 1944, she taught in the Reformed (Hungarian Calvinist) girls' gymnasium of Hódmezővásárhely. She wrote a verse novel titled Szüret (‘Harvest’) about her experiences during World War II, which she only published in 1975. After the war, she moved to Budapest. From 1945 until her dismissal in 1949, she worked as an officer on film, then literature at the Ministry of Religious and Public Educational Affairs. She married fellow writer and translator Tibor Szobotka (1913–1982) in 1947.

Multiple books by Szabó are autofictional, including Ókut/‘The Ancient Well’ (1970), Régimódi történet/‘Old-Fashioned Story’ (1977), and Für Elise (2002). Their (unacknowledged) fictional elements, which are incompatible with each other, make details of Szabó’s personal life, childhood, and family relationships difficult to ascertain.

=== Writing career ===
Szabó began her writing career as a poet and in 1947 she published her first book of poetry, Bárány ("Lamb"), which was followed by Vissza az emberig ("Back to the Human") in 1949. In 1949 she was awarded the Baumgarten Prize, which was immediately withdrawn when Szabó was labelled an enemy to the Communist Party. She was dismissed from the Ministry in the same year. The Stalinist era from 1949 to 1956 censored any literature, such as Szabó's work, that did not conform to socialist realism. Since her husband was also censored by the communist regime, she was forced to teach in a Calvinist girls' school until 1959.

She wrote her first novel, Freskó ("Fresco") during these years, and it was published in 1958. The novel tells the story of a puritan family coming together for a funeral, and examines questions of hypocrisy and Hungarian history. In the same year, she published another book of poetry, Bárány Boldizsár (" Balthazar the Lamb"), and a novel for younger female readers, Mondják meg Zsófikának (translated into English as "Tell Sophie ...").

Az őz ("The Fawn"), published in 1959, is a novel centred around an actress and her struggle to overcome a difficult, impoverished childhood. In this novel, Szabó effectively portrays the psychological, internal world of the modern woman. In 1961 and 1962, Szabó published two more novels for young women, Álarcosbál ("Masked Ball") and Születésnap ("Birthday") respectively. Pilátus ("Iza's Ballad"), the story of a female doctor and her relationship with her mother, was published in 1963. Tündér Lala ("Lara the Fairy"), her 1965 novel, is one of the most popular novels for children written in Hungarian. In 1969, she published Katalin utca ("Katalin Street"), a realistic depiction of post-World War II life. Her most widely read novel Abigél ("Abigail", 1970) is an adventure story about a young girl living in a Calvinist girls-only school in eastern Hungary during World War II. The novel's success resulted in a TV series, produced in 1978; the novel was also adapted into a musical that premiered in March 2008. In 1971, Szabó began a series of autobiographical works, which depict her family history. The first of this series is the short novel, Ókút ("The Ancient Well"), followed by Régimódi történet ("Old-Fashioned Story"). In 2002, Szabó continued this autobiographical series with Für Elise, a recollection of the author's life from 1917 to 1935. Today, this is one of her most popular works in Hungarian.

In 1975, Szabó published a collection of plays titled Az órák és a farkasok ("The Wolf Hours"). She published two more dramas in 1984, Erőnk szerint ("According to Our Strength") and Béla Király ("King Béla").

Her novel Az ajtó (The Door) was published in 1987 and would become one of her most famous works worldwide. The novel revolves around the relationship between two women, one a prominent Hungarian writer much like Szabó herself, and the other her cryptic housekeeper. Claire Messud wrote in the New York Times that reading The Door completely changed her outlook on life. Cynthia Zarin, contributor to The New Yorker, called it "a bone-shaking book." The Door was translated into English in 1995 by Stefan Draughon, and again in 2005 by Len Rix.

Lucy Jeffery discusses how Szabó’s descriptions of the domestic in Iza's Ballad, Katalin Street, and The Door convey the impact of Hungary's troubled political history on the concepts of the home and homeland. Jeffery suggests that, "As Szabó interweaves politics, creativity, and the domestic, her novels become politically motivated acts of breaking an enforced silence." In their discussion of Szabó's well-known novel Abigél, Lucy Jeffery and Anna Váradi highlight the importance of the identity of the Hungarian nation to Szabó, arguing that it is one of the novelist’s prevailing themes. Jeffery and Váradi conclude their article by remarking that, "In Abigél, Szabó demonstrates that in the wake of Trianon, negotiations between the distinctiveness of Hungarian cultural identity on the one hand and a uniform, systematised global space on the other produce divisive and inconclusive results that lead to a split definition of Hungary as Nagymagyarország and Hungary as Magyarország."

=== Death ===
She died in her home in Kerepes, near Budapest, while reading.

== Selected bibliography ==
- Mondják meg Zsófikának (1958). Tell Sally..., trans. Ursula McLean (Corvina Press, 1963).
- Az őz (1959). The Fawn, trans. Kathleen Szasz (J. Cape, 1963; Knopf, 1963); later by Len Rix (New York Review Books, 2023).
- Disznótor (1960). Night of the Pig-Killing, trans. Kathleen Szasz (J. Cape, 1965; Knopf, 1966).
- Pilátus (1963). Iza's Ballad, trans. George Szirtes (Harvill Secker, 2014; New York Review Books, 2016).
- Katalin utca (1969). Katalin Street, trans. Agnes Farkas Smith (Kids 4 Kids, 2005); later by Len Rix (New York Review Books, 2017).
- Abigél (1970). Abigail, trans. Len Rix (New York Review Books, 2020).
- Az ajtó (1987). The Door, trans. Stefan Draughon (East European Monographs, 1995); later by Len Rix (Harvill Press, 2005; New York Review Books, 2015).

== Awards and prizes ==
- 1949: awarded the Baumgarten Prize, although it was withdrawn the same day.
- 1959, 1972: awarded the József Attila, a top Hungarian literary prize.
- 1978: awarded the Kossuth Prize.
- 2003: a French translation of "The Door" by Chantal Philippe is awarded the Prix Femina étranger, a French literary award, for the best foreign novel
- Abigél was chosen as the sixth most popular novel in the Hungarian version of Big Read. Three more of her novels appeared in the top 100: Für Elise, An Old-Fashioned Story and The Door.
- 2006: Len Rix's English translation of The Door awarded the Oxford-Weidenfeld Translation Prize.
- 2006: Len Rix's English translation of The Door shortlisted for the Independent Foreign Fiction Prize 2006.
- 2007: French translation of Katalin Street awarded the 2007 Prix Cévennes du roman européen.
- 2015: Len Rix's English translation of The Door listed as one of the New York Times Book Review 10 Best Books of 2015
- 2018: 2018 PEN Translation Prize for Katalin Street, translated by Len Rix
- 2019: Warwick Prize for Women in Translation (short-listed) for Len Rix's translation of Katalin Street
- 2020: Hyman Wingate Prize for Writing about Jewry, long-listed for Len Rix's translation of Katalin Street
- 2020: Warwick Prize for Women in Translation (short-listed) for Len Rix's translation of Abigail

== Tribute ==
On 5 October 2017, Google celebrated her 100th birthday with a Google Doodle.
