= A fekete város =

- Author: Kálmán Mikszáth
- Language: Hungarian
- Publication date: 1910
- Publication place: Hungary

A fekete város (The Black City, or The Black Town) is a Hungarian novel of Kálmán Mikszáth set in the town of Lőcse, today Levoča. It is based on real historical events, but the story and dialogue are fictional.

It was adapted for television in 1972, starring Ferenc Bessenyei and Vera Venczel.

== Story ==
=== The murder ===
Before Rákóczi's war of liberty, during a hunting expedition, Pál Görgey, the arrogant but noble leader of the Hungarian county of Szepes, shoots Károly Kramler, Saxon magistrate of Lőcse, for having killed Görgey’s favourite dog.

When their magistrate is fatally injured, his company, on the advice of one of their members, Nustkorb, takes the still-living body and marks with his blood the boundaries of a large field owned by Görgey. This was because during the conflict between king Róbert Károly and Máté Csák III, the ruler gave a special and bizarre privilege for the magistrate of Lőcse for his service in combat - "Let the magistrate of Lőcse have land-claiming-blood". Thus the field marked out by the magistrate's blood became a possession of the town

=== The revenge ===
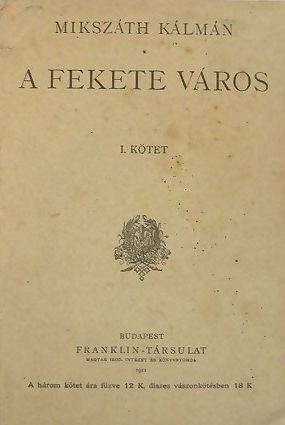
First edition title page

Thirsting for revenge the city embalms one of the dead magistrate's hands, and orders all citizens to wear black clothes until Kramler's death is revenged. To protect his daughter, Rozália Görgey, her father hides her in Lőcse in secret under the name of "Rozália Otrokócsy", hoping that she will not be sought for, being so close to home. Rozália falls in love with Antal Fabricius, the youngest senator of Lőcse.

The next magistrate is Nustkorb, who tries to catch Görgey but all his plans fail. He dies when the statue of the dead magistrate falls and kills him. The traumatized citizens now believe that Nustkorb was killed by Kramler's ghost, who took a revenge on his real murderer.

Antal Fabricius then becomes the magistrate. Fabricius makes a trap for Görgey, catches and executes him - but realises too late that he was Rozália’s father. He is shocked by this discovery; but on the streets all the folk of Lőcse are glad, singing, dancing and burning their black clothes now that the revenge has been completed.

== English translation ==
The Town in Black, translated by Bernard Adams. Budapest: Corvina, 2011
