= Peter Hargitai =

Hungarian-American poet, author and translator (1947–2026)

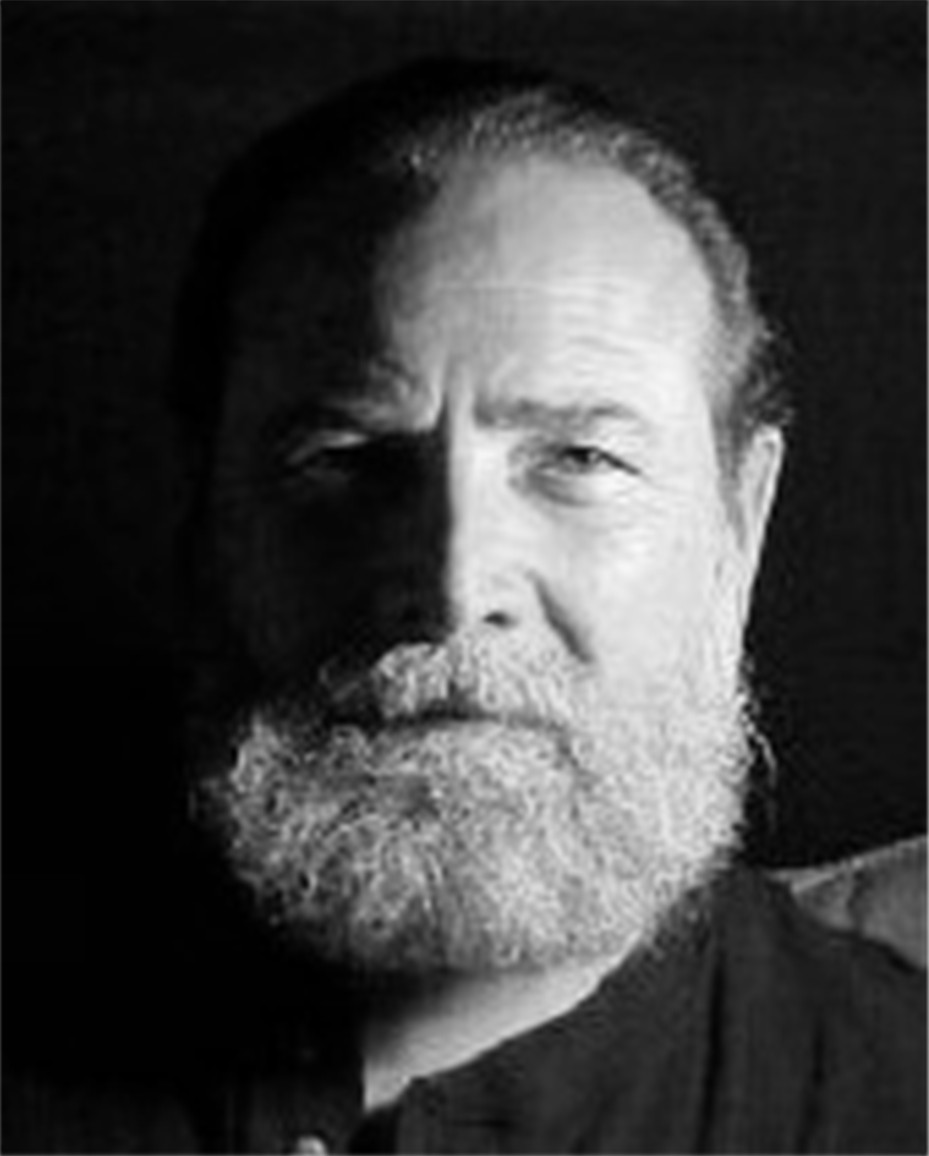
- Born: Peter Joseph Hargitai; January 28, 1947; Budapest, Hungary
- Died: January 28, 2026 (aged 79)
- Education: University of Massachusetts Amherst
- Occupations: Poet; novelist; translator
- Spouse: Dianne Kress
- Children: 2
- Writing career
- Notable awards: Harold Morton Landon Translation Award (1988)

Peter Joseph Hargitai (January 28, 1947 – January 28, 2026) was a Hungarian-born American poet, novelist and translator of Hungarian literature.

== Background ==
Hargitai was born in Budapest, Hungary, in 1947. At the age of nine he wrote his first poem "Rebels", meant as a tribute to the failed 1956 Hungarian Revolution. He moved to the United States with his father, a judge before the Soviet occupation, his mother, and two brothers. Poems in his adopted language did not come until his university studies in Cleveland between 1965 and 1975 when he contributed occasional poems to the Frigate and the Dark Tower, two literary magazines connected with Cleveland State University.

At the age of 20, he married Dianne Kress; they had two children. He died on January 28, 2026, his 79th birthday.

== Career and writings ==
In 1969, Hargitai started teaching English at St. Clement school in a Cleveland suburb, followed by assignments at St. Boniface, Mentor High, and two evenings a week at Telshe Yeshiva Rabbinical School. He founded the Poetry Forum Program after being awarded a grant from the Martha-Holden Jennings Foundation so local poets could work side by side with students, their combined efforts culminating in a regional collection with the title Forum:Ten Poets of the Western Reserve published in 1976. The collection, which Hargitai edited with Lolette Kuby, was introduced by Paul Engle and featured, among others, Robert Wallace, Alberta Turner, Hale Chatfield, Russell Atkins, and Grace Butcher, alongside student poets. Hargitai's passion for a literary career took a serious turn when he discovered and translated the poems of the modern Hungarian poet Attila József (1905–1937).

In 1978, Hargitai secured a position at the University of Miami teaching composition and introductory courses in English and American literatures; the early 80's saw him turning his attention once again to Attila József, and he continued publishing individual poems although a collection did not come together until Perched on Nothing's Branch, released by Apalachee Press in 1987. The short volume won the Harold Morton Landon Translation Award from the Academy of American Poets. In her citation for the academy in 1988, May Swenson praised the translations as “grim, bitter, iron-clad emerging technically strong and admirably contemporary in syntax.”

Hargitai's own poetry, having been intentionally placed on the back burner behind his translations, started to find a home in literary magazines like the California Quarterly in which his poem “Mother’s Visit No. 29” tied for third place.

While lecturing at the University of Miami, Hargitai took a fiction writing course from Isaac Bashevis Singer. The experience with the Nobel Laureate proved to be profound and genre changing; under Singer's tutelage, he became not only an enthusiastic student of short fiction but the Nobel Laureate's personal chauffeur from the Coral Gables campus to his Surfside condominium: Hargitai found himself drawn to the short story, and he started publishing his stories in respectable journals on both sides of the Atlantic. Hargitai re-enrolled in graduate school, receiving a Master of Fine Arts degree at the University of Massachusetts at Amherst.

In 1988 under a grant from the Fulbright-Hayes Foundation he was able to spend time in Hungary and Italy translating Antal Szerb’s 1937 novel The Traveler and the Moonlight. At the request of the author’s widow he did not publish his English version (The Traveler) until after her death in 1994. For this effort, the first translation in the English language, he was presented with the Füst Milán Award from the Hungarian Academy of Arts and Sciences.

After returning from Europe, Hargitai obtained a teaching position at Florida International University in Miami where he was to work until his retirement in 2012. While at FIU, he published a collection of original poems in Mother Tongue: A Broken Hungarian Love Song, a volume of short stories, Budapest to Bellevue, a collection of folk tales titled Magyar Tales, three novels (Attila, Millie, and Daughter of the Revolution), and a two volume textbook about the Hungarian exile experience.

Hargitai may have vacillated between prose and poetry, but he did not abandon poetry altogether, publishing Witch's Island and Other Poems in 2013. His signature poem, “Mother’s Visit No. 29” was included in the anthology Sixty Years of American Poetry, and his poem “Mother’s a Racist” won the 2009 Dr. Martin Luther King Jr. Poetry Prize. His translation of Attila József was listed by Yale critic Harold Bloom in his The Western Canon: The Books and School of the Ages. Hargitai was also a contributing writer to the anthology "Fodor's Budget Zion", a collection of poetry and prose. Peter Hargitai was appointed the first poet laureate of Gulfport, Florida in 2015.

== Awards ==
- 1988 Academy of American Poets Harold Morton Landon Landon Translation Award
- 1988 Fulbright Grant, Hungary
- 2006 "Medal of Freedom" presented by the American Hungarian Federation in Washington, D.C.
- 2006 American Hungarian Federation Grant to write the novel Daughter of the Revolution in both English and Hungarian languages
- 2009 City of Miami Gardens MLK Performance Poetry Competition (1st Place) Miami Gardens, Florida
- 2015 Appointed first poet laureate of Gulfport, Florida

== Publications ==
=== Poetry ===
- Witch's Island and Other Poems. iUniverse, Incorporated. 2013. ISBN 978-1-4759-7458-4.
- Budapest Tales: A Collection of Central European Contemporary Writing. New Europe Writers. 2009. ISBN 978-83-923168-5-5.
- The Quest for the Miracle Stag, Vol. II, poetry in translation. University of Illinois Press. 2003. ISBN 963-210-814-0.
- Mother Tongue. iUniverse. 2003. ISBN 978-0-595-27302-7.
- Having a Wonderful Time: An Anthology of South Florida Writers, pp. 184-187. Simon and Schuster. 2003.
- 60 Years of American Poetry. Abrams, Harry N., Inc. 1996. ISBN 0-8109-4464-2.
- Forum: Ten Poets of the Western Reserve. Mentor. 1978.

=== Fiction ===
- Who Let the Bats Out? Twisted Tales from Transylvania. iUniverse, Incorporated. 2013. ISBN 978-1-4759-7161-3..
- Approaching My Literature: Translations from the Hungarian Exilic Experience, Vol. Two. Cognella University Readers. 2011. ISBN 978-1-60927-012-4.
- 2012: The Little Horn of Prophecy. iUniverse, Incorporated. 2010. ISBN 978-1-4502-6824-0.
- Daughter of the Revolution: A Novel. iUniverse, Incorporated. 2006. ISBN 978-0-595-41444-4.
- A Forradalom Lanya. Puski Kado, Incorporated. 2006. ISBN 978-963-9592-23-0.
- Millie. Nagyvilag Kiado, Inc. 2008. ISBN 978-963-9175-37-2.
- Millie. iUniverse. 2006. ISBN 978-0-595-84308-4.
- Attila: a Barbarian's Bedtime Story. iUniverse. 2003. ISBN 978-0-595-27300-3.
- Attila: A Barbarian's Bedtime Story. Püski-Corvin Press. 1994. ISBN 978-0-595-84308-4.
- Budapesttol New Yorkig es tovabb. Europa Press. 1991. ISBN 963-07-5315-4.
- Budapest to Bellevue. Palmetto Press with Kultura Budapest. 1989.
- Magyar Tales. University of Massachusetts. 1989. ASIN B0006ES3D6. OCLC 20919722.

=== Translations ===
- Traveler and the Moonlight. Translated by Peter Hargitai. iUniverse. 2016. ISBN 978-1-4917-8928-5.
- Attilla Jozsef: Selected Poems. Translated by Peter Hargitai. iUniverse. 2005. ISBN 0-595-35614-1.
- Inventing Being. Translated by Peter Hargitai. iUniverse. 2004. ISBN 978-0-595-33794-1.
- The Traveler a novel by Antal Szerb translated first by Peter Hargitai (translation of: Utas és holdvilág). Püski-Corvin Press NY, NY, USA. 1994. ISBN 0-915951-21-5.
- The Traveler a novel by Antal Szerb. iUniverse. 2003. ISBN 978-0-595-27878-7.
- Perched on Nothing's Branch: Selected Poems of Attila Jozsef. Translated by Peter Hargitai. White Pine Press. 1999. ISBN 978-1-893996-00-7.
- Perched on Nothing's Branch: Selected Poems of Attila József. Translated by Peter Hargitai. Apalachee Press. 1987. ISBN 0-940821-00-1.

=== Non-fiction ===
- "Budapest is a riot!". October 29, 2006.
