= The Door (Szabó novel) =

Novel by Magda Szabó

- Author: Magda Szabó
- Original title: Az ajtó
- Translator: Stefan Draughon; Len Rix
- Language: Hungarian
- Genre: Novel
- Publisher: East European Monographs/Harvill Secker
- Publication date: 1985 (Hungarian); 15 February 1995 (English); 20 October 2005 (English)
- Publication place: Hungary
- Media type: Print (Hardback & Paperback)
- Pages: 272 pp
- ISBN: 0-88033-304-9 (USA); ISBN 1-84343-193-9 (UK)
- OCLC: 32332728
- LC Class: PH3351.S592 A7413 1994

The Door is a novel by Hungarian writer Magda Szabó. The Door was originally published in Hungary in 1987, and translated into English in 1995 by Stefan Draughon for American publication, and again in 2005 by Len Rix for British publication. Rix's translation won the 2006 Oxford-Weidenfeld Translation Prize, and was short-listed for the Independent Foreign Fiction Prize. Rix's translation was republished in 2015 by New York Review Books Classics.

A film based on the novel, directed by István Szabó, was released in March 2012.

== Plot ==
The novel begins with Magda, the narrator, recounting the recurring dream that haunts her in her old age. As Magda explains, after waking up from this dream, she is forced to face the fact that "I killed Emerence". The story that follows is Magda's attempt to explain what she means by this sentence; it is the comprehensive story of her decades-long relationship with her housekeeper Emerence. When the story begins, Magda has just come into favour with the government and her works are finally allowed to be published again. She realises that she must employ a housekeeper to be able to dedicate herself to writing full-time. A former classmate recommends an older woman named Emerence. Emerence agrees to come work for her on her own terms, but she will not, she informs Magda, just be a person to "wash the dirty linen" of whoever is willing to hire her. For several years, Magda and Emerence have a somewhat unconventional relationship. Emerence sets her own wages and her own hours, and even chooses which household chores she will or will not accept. Even though she works in Magda's home, Emerence remains as much an enigma to Magda as she is to the rest of the neighbourhood. The neighbours on their street are bewildered by but still respect this odd elderly woman who is so particular in her habits and guards the closed doors of her house with the utmost secrecy. The relationship between the two women changes dramatically some years after Emerence begins working for Magda, when Magda's husband suddenly becomes seriously ill. Magda, not thinking that Emerence cares about her personal life, takes her husband to the hospital for an operation without telling Emerence. When she returns, Emerence feels furiously betrayed. The two women stay up talking through the night, and get to know each other on a much deeper level than ever before. Although this night does not make them into instant friends, it certainly lays the foundation for the friendship that gradually emerges. Shortly after this episode, Magda and her husband find a starving puppy and take it in, with the intention of nourishing it back to health and then giving it away. Emerence and the dog, however, form a very quick and incredibly close bond, and the dog, whom Emerence names Viola (even though it is a male) adds an extra dimension to the relationship between the two women - Magda, the dog's owner, and Emerence, the dog's master. Over the next several years, Magda and Emerence become increasingly close, and start to depend on each other more than either of them could have anticipated. Together, they experience all the drama of the neighbourhood, including the suicide of Pollet, one of Emerence's three close female friends. The two women open up to each other, and Magda learns many details of Emerence's life, including the story of her early life in the same rural region where Magda has family roots. She also learns the story of how Emerence saved the life of the baby Eva Grossman, the daughter of the wealthy Jewish family whose house Emerence cared for before they fled the country. Emerence develops so much trust for Magda that she allows her inside her house, an honour she has bestowed on nobody else in decades, not even her three best friends or her own nephew. Near the end of the story, the always robust Emerence falls ill and is unable to continue to perform her duties. She hides away in her house, allowing entry to nobody. Magda, out of genuine concern, intervenes and arranges to forcibly take Emerence to a hospital to recover. Emerence very nearly recovers, but when she finds out that Magda betrayed her secret by letting the whole street into her closely guarded home, Emerence loses her will to live. Emerence dies in the hospital, and Magda is racked with guilt for the rest of her life.

== Characters ==
- Magda: The narrator of the novel. Magda is a writer who is coming back into favour with the government when the novel begins, but the main focus of the novel is her relationship with Emerence. Unlike Emerence, Magda is sincerely religious
- Magda's husband: An unnamed academic with whom Magda enjoys a fine relationship. The husband has a serious bout of illness several years after Emerence comes to work for him and Magda. He tolerates, but does not get along with Emerence.
- Emerence: Magda's housekeeper who works on her own terms. Although ageing, Emerence is a strong and driven personality, and has been fiercely independent since her unfortunate childhood in rural Hungary. Emerence takes care of Magda's house and the streets of the neighbourhood with a vitality that is almost superhuman.
- Viola: A dog that Magda found as a frail puppy buried in the snow one Christmas Day. Magda takes him in but Emerence becomes his master; Emerence and Viola enjoy a special connection that Magda is unable to understand or be part of.
- Adélka: An elderly widowed pensioner, one of Emerence's three female friends who she entertains on the porch of her house.
- Polett (formerly Paulette): An impoverished elderly friend of Emerence. Polett now lives alone and in poverty but was previously employed as a French governess. She is the second of Emerence's trio of older female friends.
- Sutu: An elderly female fruit and vegetable seller, the third of Emerence's close friends.
- "Józsi's boy": The son of Emerence's brother, her sole living relative she still has a good relationship with
- the Lieutenant Colonel: Emerence's friend and a lieutenant colonel in the police force. He and Magda shoulder the burden of responsibility for Emerence.
- Eva Grossman: the baby daughter of the Jewish family whose home Emerence took care of before they fled the country, leaving behind little Eva in the care of Emerence. Grown up, Eva lives in the United States when the story takes place.

== Autobiographical content ==
Although the work cannot be taken autobiographically, there are many similarities between the life of the author Magda and the narrator, Magda. As the back of the New York Review of Books publication of the novel writes, "Magda is a writer, educated, married to an academic, public-spirited, with an on-again-off-again relationship to Hungary's Communist authorities". The author, Magda Szabó, was also an educated writer and married to an academic, the Hungarian translator Tibor Szobotka. Events from the book such as Magda being sent to Greece as part of the Hungarian delegation for a literary conference could easily have been taken from the life of the author, and the award that the character Magda receives from the Hungarian Parliament in the story could be easily exchanged with one of the many awards that the author has won. Even the on-again-off-again relationship that Magda in the book enjoys with the Hungarian government is evocative of Szabo's relationship with that same institution; while she did win many national literary awards, she was also labelled an "enemy of the people" by the Communist government, was fired from the Ministry of Education, and had her books banned from publication from 1949 to 1956.

== Critical reception ==
The Door has won many literary prizes and awards:

- In 2015, it was included in The New York Times 10 best books of 2015
- In 2006, Len Rix's translation won the Oxford-Weidenfeld Translation Prize
- Shortlisted for the Independent Foreign Fiction Prize
- The 2003 Prix Femina étranger (French translation)

The book has received high praise, including the following:

- Claire Messud, for The New York Times Book Review, Feb. 6, 2015: "I've been haunted by this novel. Szabo's lines and images come to my mind unexpectedly, and with them powerful emotions. It has altered the way I understand my own life."
- Clara Györgyey, for World Literature Today: "Szabo's style (the text is brilliantly translated), laced with gentle humor, is as mesmerizing as are her characters. Her dexterous, self-ironizing distance (the autobiographical elements are obvious), the detached gestures with which the narrator interrupts herself, the muted fury that erupts in overlong or half-sentences, and a certain moral seriousness and ethical anguish also impregnate this gem of a novel. Ultimately, the text is a tranquil memento, a piece of irrefutable poetry, a bizarre counterpart to our universal betrayal—out of love."
