= The Pendragon Legend =

1934 novel by Antal Szerb

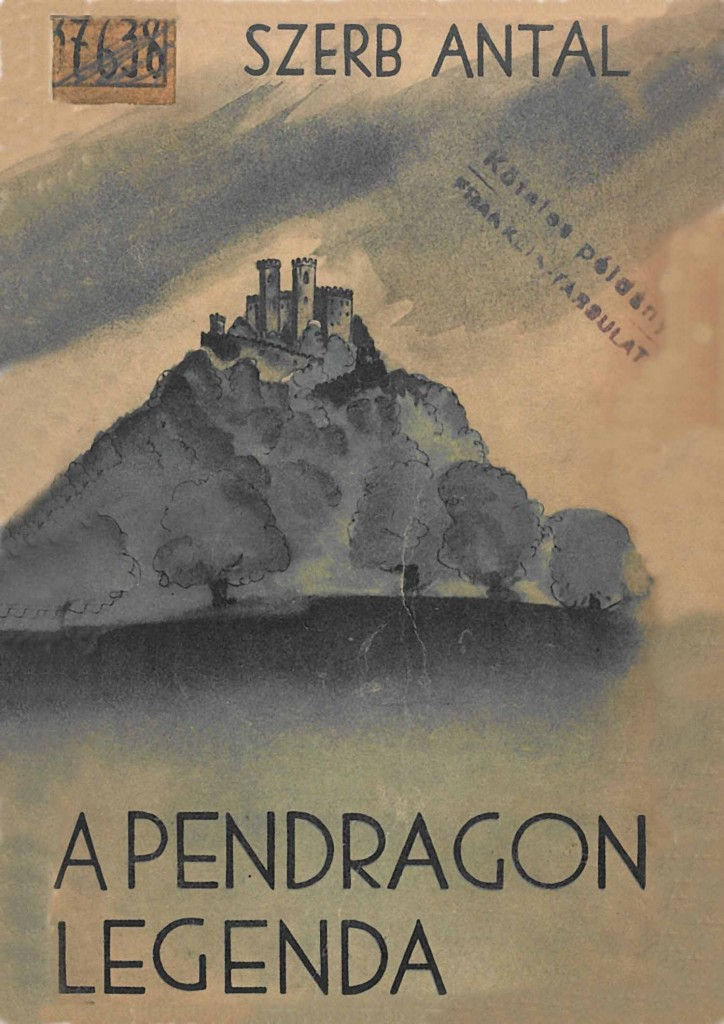
- Cover of the first Hungarian edition
- Author: Antal Szerb
- Original title: A Pendragon-legenda
- Translator: Len Rix
- Language: Hungarian
- Genre: Novel
- Publisher: Pushkin Press
- Publication date: 1934
- Publication place: Hungary
- English publication date: 2006
- Pages: 330
- ISBN: 978-1-901285-60-4
- OCLC: 62133367

The Pendragon Legend (Hungarian: A Pendragon-legenda) is a 1934 novel by the Hungarian writer Antal Szerb.

The book is a philosophical thriller/comedy/murder-mystery/ghost story set first in London and then in Wales. A mystical element is diffused through an increasingly complex plot, as all threads converge in the final chapters. Literary scholar József Havasréti has specifically highlighted the influence of Jenő Heltai, Ferenc Molnár, and Jenő Rejtő on the novel, noting how its wit, playful irony, and genre-blending narrative recall important traditions of twentieth-century Hungarian popular and humorous fiction. At the same time, the novel can be situated within a broader European tradition of occult and esoteric fiction. Its literary antecedents could include Là-bas (1891) by Joris-Karl Huysmans, The Magician (1908) by W. Somerset Maugham, and The Angel of the West Window (1927) by Gustav Meyrink, all of which may be regarded as important literary precursors to The Pendragon Legend, although such influences are not directly documented on the basis of the author's essays or other writings. (One of the famous non-fiction works of Antal Szerb is The History of World Literature [A világirodalom története], first published in 1941.)

The Pendragon Legend was first translated into English by Lili Halápy in 1963, and again by Len Rix in 2006.

== Film adaptation ==
In 1974, the novel was turned into a film The Pendragon Legend directed by György Révész.

== Historical References ==
The novel contains many references to English and European mysticism:

- Rosicrucians
- Robert Fludd
- Count of St. Germain
- Paracelsus
- Philosopher's Stone
- Great Work
