= Abigail (novel) =

1970 novel by Magda Szabó

- Author: Magda Szabó
- Language: Hungarian
- Publication date: January 1, 1970

Abigail (Hungarian: Abigél) is a 1970 young adult novel by the Hungarian author Magda Szabó. Abigail is an adventure story about a teenage girl who attends a Calvinist girls' school in eastern Hungary during World War II.

In the Hungarian Big Read in 2005, it was voted the sixth most popular novel in Hungary. It was the third most popular Hungarian novel on the list. The novel has been translated into Catalan, Czech, French, German, Italian, Korean, Latvian, Persian, Polish, Romanian, Serbian, Slovenian, Spanish, Swedish, and Turkish. An English translation by Len Rix was published in January 2020. A Hungarian audiobook is read by Ildikó Piros (who played Sister Susanna in a television adaptation of the novel), and an English audiobook is read by Samantha Desz.

== Plot summary ==
The novel is set in 1943, during the Second World War. Hungary has entered World War II and allied with Germany. By 1943, the Hungarian army has suffered huge losses and the mood has turned.

The main character of the novel is Georgina "Gina" Vitay, a girl from Budapest, the daughter of a war general. Gina's mother has died, and in 1943 her governess has to leave Hungary abruptly and return to her native France. Without an explanation, Gina's father takes her to the Matula Institute, an old and traditional Calvinist girls' boarding school in the town of Árkod (now Jarkovac) in easternmost Hungary. The closed puritanical world of the Matula forces Gina, used to individualism and freedom, to give up her former life. The strict rules, the education by deaconesses, the busy schedule of the pupils, as well as the pious life in Árkod are far from her previous home.

On her second day at school, Gina has a fit of rage and reveals a classmate's secret to the headmaster. This causes her classmates to ostracize her for months. Gina feels lonely and seeks a way to escape to Budapest. Her attempt fails as a teacher finds her and takes her back to the school. Her attempt to escape forces her father to tell her why she must stay in Árkod: General Vitay is the leader of a resistance group within the Hungarian military, and he does not want his enemies to find his daughter. He tells her that she must stay at the school and not leave, unless accompanied by himself or another trusted person, whom she will recognize. Learning this, Gina accepts her father's plan and reconciles with her classmates. As Gina accepts some of Matula's traditions, the school seems less rigorous.

The school's greatest legend was woven around the statue in the garden, named Abigail by the schoolgirls. The mysterious benefactor, who gives help to those who write Abigail a letter, appears in Gina's life too. The mysterious character not only solves adolescent problems, but takes on serious social responsibilities, such as getting new identity documents for students who have Jewish ancestry

Gina does not hear from her father for months. She is forced to stay at the school at all times, including over Christmas, still without a word. Early in spring, she is visited by her suitor from home, Feri Kuncz. He says her father is ill and is waiting for her. Gina thinks that Feri is the "trusted person" her father told her of. However, it was a lie, and it becomes clear that Gina has to leave the Matula and Árkod. The winds of war have arrived at the impregnable Matula. Helped by Mici Horn, an ex-pupil of Matula and a war widow, Gina escapes from Árkod and gets a new identity.

At the end of the novel, Gina finds out Abigail's true identity. Mr. Kőnig, a teacher whom she hated and looked down on during the school year, was secretly her greatest helper and the savior of many lives.

== Adaptations ==
A TV series based on the novel was produced in 1978. The novel was also adapted as a musical that premiered in March 2008.
