= Journey by Moonlight =

1937 novel by Antal Szerb

- Author: Antal Szerb
- Original title: Utas és holdvilág
- Translator: Len Rix
- Language: Hungarian
- Genre: Novel
- Publisher: Révai Testvérek (Hungarian), Pushkin Press (English)
- Publication date: 1937 (English: 2001, 2003)
- Publication place: Hungary
- Media type: Print (Hardback & Paperback)
- Pages: 368
- ISBN: 1-901285-37-5
- OCLC: 47978000
- Dewey Decimal: 894.51133 21
- LC Class: PH3351.S86 U813 2001

Journey by Moonlight (Hungarian: Utas és holdvilág, literally "Traveler and Moonlight") is a 1937 novel by Hungarian writer Antal Szerb. It is among the best-known novels in Hungarian literature. According to English literary critic Nicholas Lezard, it is "one of the greatest works of modern European literature [...] I can't remember the last time I did this: finished a novel and then turned straight back to page one to start it over again. That is, until I read Journey by Moonlight."

== Plot ==
The novel follows Mihály, a Budapest native from a bourgeois family on his honeymoon in Italy as he encounters and attempts to make sense of his past. The novel features his romantic figure, aloof and poetic, but struggling to break with an adolescent rebelliousness which he tries to quell under respectable bourgeois conformism, but also with the disturbing attraction of an erotic death-wish.

Some of the neurotic episodes that Mihály experiences throughout the story have been understood as motifs related to Freudian psychoanalysis, which had been especially influential at the time in Hungary.

== Characters ==
- Mihály: Hungarian citizen, a native resident of Budapest
- Erzsi: wife of Mihály
- János Szepetneki, Ervin, Tamás and Éva Ulpius: old friends of Mihály
- Zoltán Pataki: first husband of Erzsi

== Release details ==
- 1937, Hungary, Révai, published 1937, paperback, ISBN 9789631424638, (first Hungarian edition)
- 1994, New York, USA, Püski-Corvin Books,ISBN 0-915951-21-5, Library of Congress Number 93-84996, published 1994, paperback (as "The Traveler", translated by Peter Hargitai (this novel's first English edition)
- 2001, London, Pushkin Press ISBN 1-901285-37-5, published 1 May 2001, paperback (as "Journey by Moonlight", by Len Rix (this translation's second edition)
- 2003, USA, Authors Choice Press, ISBN 0-595-79508-0, hardcover, as "The Traveler", translated by Peter Hargitai
- 2006, London, Pushkin Press ISBN 1-901285-50-2, published 27 February 2006, paperback (as "Journey by Moonlight")
- 2012, Zagreb, Croatia, ISBN 978-953-332-000-7, published 2012, Naklada OceanMore, paperback (as "Putnik i mjesečina" / "Traveler and Moonlight" – Croatian first edition)

The novel has been translated into German, French, Italian, English, Polish, Spanish, Dutch, Slovene, Swedish, Croatian and Danish.

== See also ==
- Antal Szerb
