= Sklabiná =

Sklabiná Mikszáthfalva
- Municipality
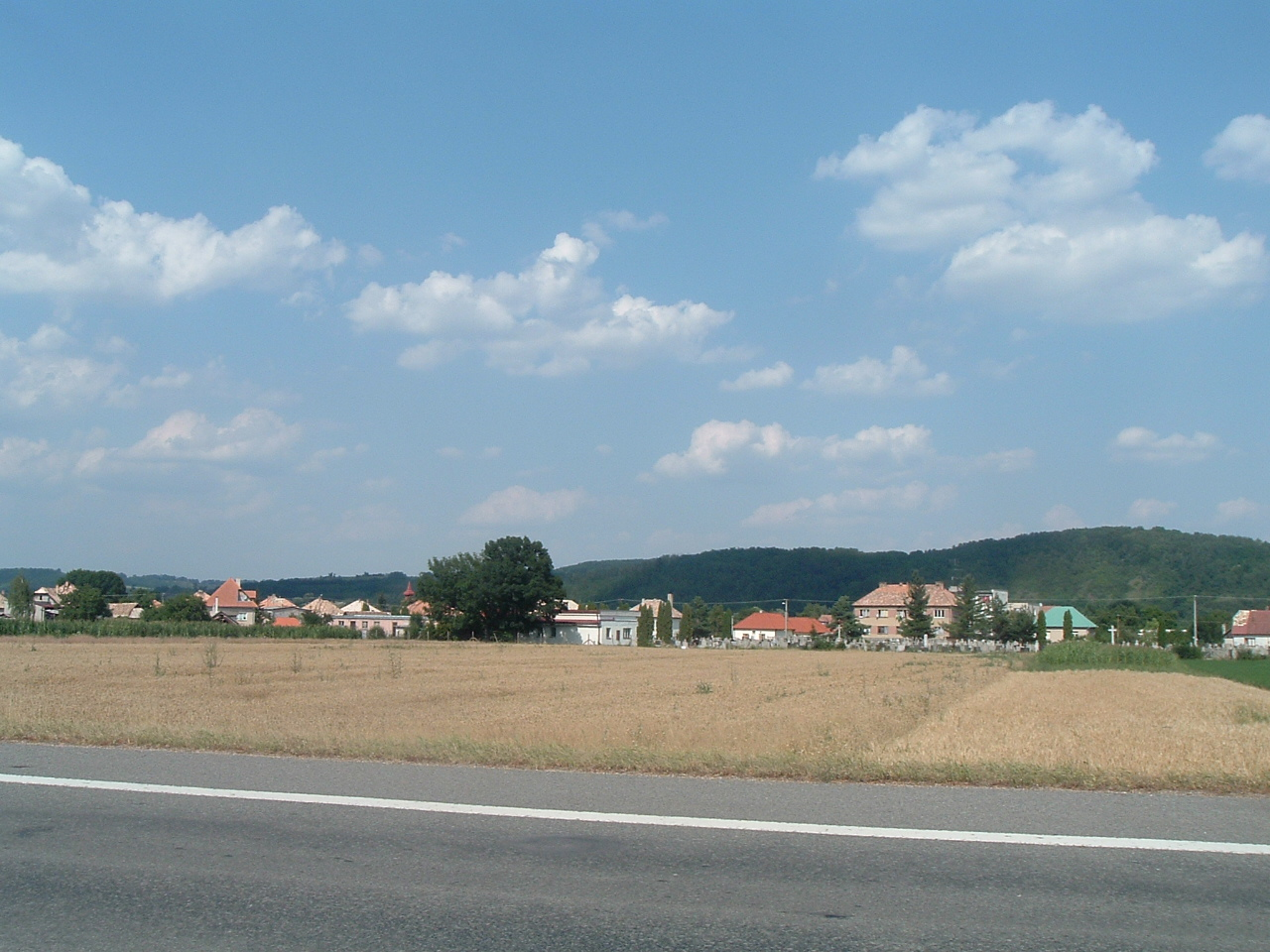

- Flag

- Location of Sklabiná in the Banská Bystrica Region Location of Sklabiná in Slovakia
- Coordinates: 48.17°N 19.37°E
- Country: Slovakia
- Region: Banská Bystrica Region
- District: Veľký Krtíš District
- First mentioned: 1330

Area
  - Total: 9.88 km^{2} (3.81 sq mi)
- Elevation: 161 m (528 ft)

Population (2025)
  - Total: 911
- Time zone: UTC+1 (CET)
  - Summer (DST): UTC+2 (CEST)
- Postal code: 991 05
- Area code: +421 47
- Vehicle registration plate (until 2022): VK
- Website: www.sklabina.eu

Sklabiná (Hungarian: Mikszáthfalva; formerly Szklabonya until 1899 and Kürtabony until 1910) is a village and municipality in the Veľký Krtíš District of the Banská Bystrica Region of southern Slovakia.

== Geography ==
The municipality lies at an altitude of 161 metres (528 ft) and covers an area of 9.88 km^{2} (3.81 sq mi) (2025).

== Population ==
Population statistic (10 years)
| Year | 1995 | 2005 | 2015 | 2025 |
|---|---|---|---|---|
| Count | 807 | 863 | 886 | 911 |
| Difference | | +6.93% | +2.66% | +2.82% |

Population statistic
| Year | 2024 | 2025 |
|---|---|---|
| Count | 912 | 911 |
| Difference | | −0.10% |

It has a population of 911 people (31 December 2025).

=== Ethnicity ===
Census 2021 (1+ %)
| Ethnicity | Number | Fraction |
|---|---|---|
| Slovak | 870 | 93.44% |
| Not found out | 44 | 4.72% |
| Romani | 25 | 2.68% |
| Hungarian | 11 | 1.18% |
| Total | 931 | |

In year 2021 was 931 people by ethnicity 870 as Slovak, 44 as Not found out, 25 as Romani, 11 as Hungarian, 7 as Ukrainian, 4 as Czech, 2 as Russian, 1 as Rusyn, 1 as Romanian, 1 as German, 1 as Other and 1 as English.

Note on population: The difference values of population numbers in the table "Population statistic" and in the sections "Ethnicity" & "Religion" is caused by the use of various statistical methods.

=== Religion ===
Census 2021 (1+ %)
| Religion | Number | Fraction |
|---|---|---|
| Roman Catholic Church | 685 | 73.58% |
| None | 112 | 12.03% |
| Not found out | 69 | 7.41% |
| Evangelical Church | 34 | 3.65% |
| Greek Catholic Church | 10 | 1.07% |
| Total | 931 | |

In year 2021 was 931 people by religion 685 from Roman Catholic Church, 112 from None, 69 from Not found out, 34 from Evangelical Church, 10 from Greek Catholic Church, 9 from Eastern Orthodox Church, 4 from Christian Congregations in Slovakia, 3 from Jehovah's Witnesses, 1 from Calvinist Church, 1 from Paganism and natural spirituality, 1 from Other, 1 from Baptists Church and 1 from Ad hoc movements.

According to the 2011 census, the municipality had 844 inhabitants, of whom 789 were ethnically Slovaks, 9 Czechs, 9 Hungarians, 7 Roma and 21 unspecified.

== Notable residents ==
- Kálmán Mikszáth, Hungarian novelist, journalist, and politician
- Lajos Zs. Nagy, Hungarian journalist, poet
