= Klára Fehér =

Hungarian writer

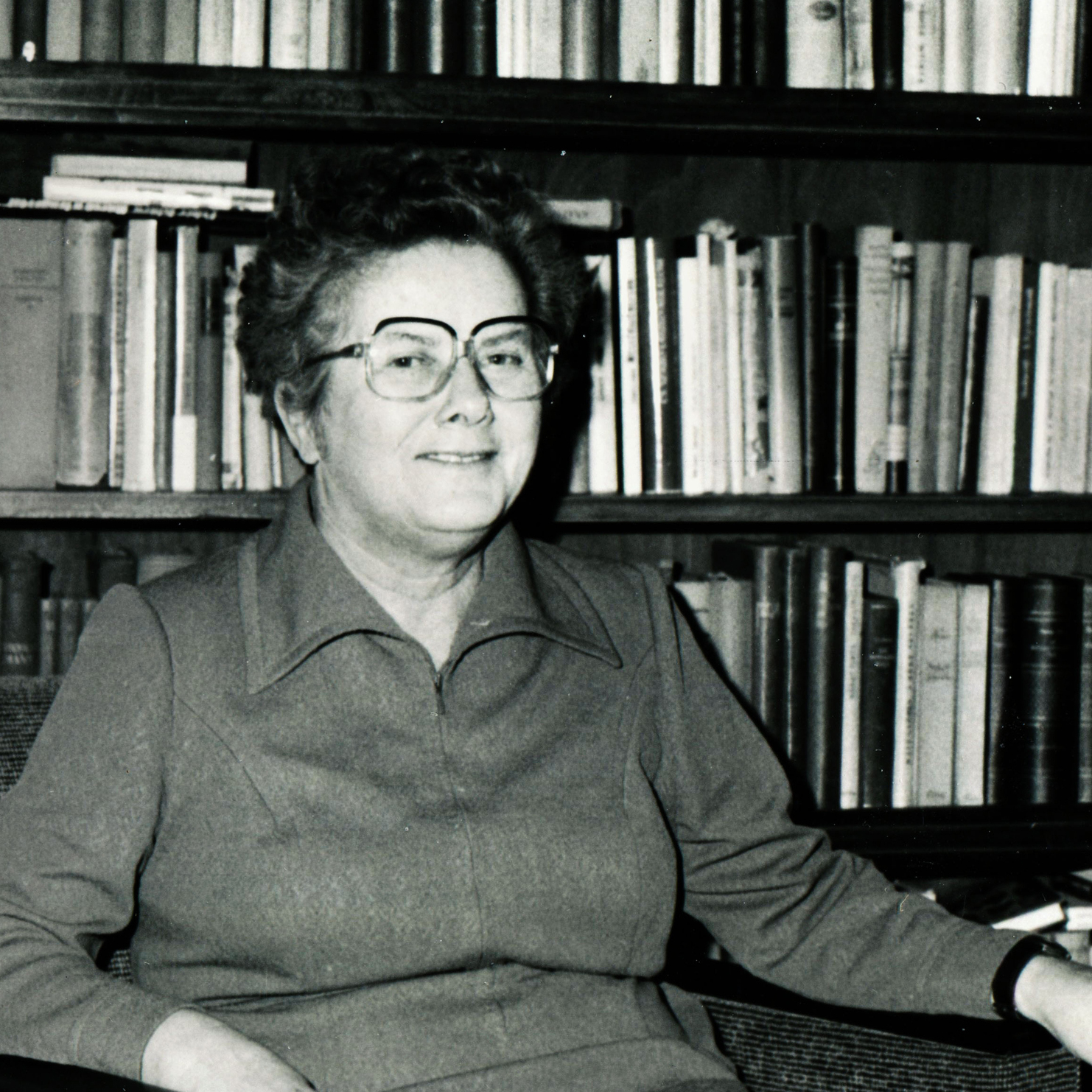
- Born: 21 May 1919; Újpest, Hungary
- Died: 11 September 1996 (aged 77); Budapest, Hungary
- Known for: writing
- Spouse: László Nemes

Klára Fehér (21 May 1919 – 11 September 1996) was a Hungarian writer.

== Life ==
Fehér was born in Újpest in 1919. She attended Budapest University from 1945 to 1948 while also being a newspaper journalist. In 1979 she became a freelance writer and wrote in a number of genres including work for children. She co-authored travel books with her husband László Nemes who was also a writer.

Fehér died in Budapest in 1996 and her husband founded a prize for literature in her name.

== Works ==
- Narkózis: regény, 1969
- And don't miss Hungary!, 1976
- A tenger : regény, 1956
- Budapest, 1962
- Bezzeg az én időmben; regény, 1976
- Nem vagyunk ördögök, 1968
- Hová álljanak a belgák? : regény, 1988
- Oxygénia, 1974
- Ich bekomme eine Insel, 1975
- Négy nap a paradicsomban : regény, 1976
