= Big Read (German) =

The Big Read initiative was launched in Germany by the public television broadcaster ZDF in 2004, under the name "Das große Lesen", with the support of the Börsenverein des Deutschen Buchhandels and Stiftung Lesen. Based on the BBC version of Big Read, it was designed as a game show to determine the top 50 books read and liked by the German people.

An initial list of 200 books was sent to more than 10,000 bookshops to start the survey. 60,000 votes were already cast within the first week. Four weeks later, the list had grown to 12,615 book nominations, and after the casting of 250,000 votes the 'winners' were determined.

== Results ==
1. The Lord of the Rings by J. R. R. Tolkien
2. The Bible
3. The Pillars of the Earth by Ken Follett
4. Perfume by Patrick Süskind
5. The Little Prince by Antoine de Saint-Exupéry
6. Buddenbrooks by Thomas Mann
7. The Physician by Noah Gordon
8. The Alchemist by Paulo Coelho
9. Harry Potter and the Philosopher's Stone by J. K. Rowling
10. Pope Joan by Donna Woolfolk Cross
11. Inkheart by Cornelia Funke
12. Outlander a.k.a. Cross Stitch by Diana Gabaldon
13. The House of the Spirits by Isabel Allende
14. The Reader by Bernhard Schlink
15. Faust by Johann Wolfgang von Goethe
16. The Shadow of the Wind by Carlos Ruiz Zafón
17. Pride and Prejudice by Jane Austen
18. The Name of the Rose by Umberto Eco
19. Angels & Demons by Dan Brown
20. Effi Briest by Theodor Fontane
21. Harry Potter and the Order of the Phoenix by J. K. Rowling
22. The Magic Mountain by Thomas Mann
23. Gone with the Wind by Margaret Mitchell
24. Siddhartha by Hermann Hesse
25. The Discovery of Heaven by Harry Mulisch
26. The Neverending Story by Michael Ende
