= St. Peter's Umbrella (novel) =

1895 novel by Kálmán Mikszáth

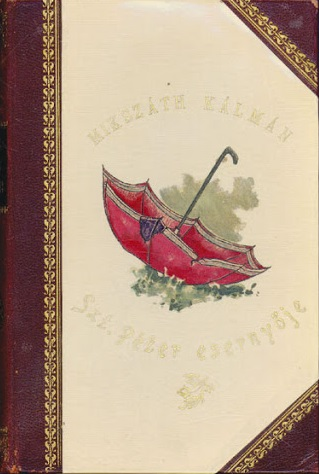

St. Peter's Umbrella (Hungarian: Szent Péter esernyője) is an 1895 novel by the Hungarian writer Kálmán Mikszáth. It is set in the town of Besztercebánya (now Banská Bystrica), describing the rural life of the peasantry in an undeveloped part of Upper Hungary (now Slovakia).

== Synopsis ==
The story is set is the rural region to the north of Hungary, now Slovakia, where Mikszáth was born. This is the territory of the Palóc people, celebrated by Mikszáth in his writings, especially the short stories A jó palócok (translated as "The Good People of Palocz"). The characters in the story are small-town middle class and the local peasantry.

The novel is in five sections, the first establishing the legend of 'St Peter's umbrella'. The key character is the young priest, János Bélyi, who has just arrived in his first parish, Glogova, so poor that the living barely supports a priest. Within a couple of weeks, a neighbour from his home village appears. He brings news of the priest's widowed mother's death, and deposits on him his two-year-old sister. How, János wonders, can he care for his sister when the parish hardly provides enough for him? He goes to the church to seek guidance, leaving little Veronica asleep in her basket on the verandah. A sudden storm with torrential rain interrupts his prayers and he hurries back to the sleeping child, only to find her perfectly dry, her basket covered by a ragged red umbrella. The villagers having seen an old Jew in the neighbourhood with the umbrella, decide that he closely resembled the picture of Saint Peter in their church. They are thus convinced that the saint has visited their village. The red umbrella becomes a miraculous object of veneration, its widespread fame bringing visitors and prosperity to the village, and to its priest.

The subsequent sections commence with a flashback set many years earlier in the neighboring town of Bestercebánya. The central figures are Pál Gregorics and his son, Gyuri Wibra. Pál, a socially awkward individual, inherits a significant sum from his mother, much to the chagrin of his two elder half-brothers and half-sister. When his cook gives birth to an illegitimate son, it becomes apparent that Pál is the father. He lavishes attention on young Gyuri Wibra and ensures his education. Considered an eccentric, Pál is always seen with a red umbrella, which he adamantly refuses to part with.

Suspicious that his brothers and sister will seek to harm Gyuri's interests, Pál secretly sells all his estates and property and deposits the cash in a bank, in exchange for a banker's draft for the entire amount to go to Gyuri. On his death, his will is read out; the brothers are stupefied that there is no mention of any estates, no fortune; just a few insignificant bequests. Gyuri, now a celebrated young lawyer, is aware the missing money was to be his inheritance. Learning that Pál had been a wartime spy and had a compartment made in the handle of his umbrella for carrying secret documents, Gyuri is convinced that a paper, proving his inheritance, is hidden in the handle. This would explain why Pál never let the umbrella out of his sight. But by this time the umbrella had already been sold, along with other sundry possessions, to an old Jew who kept a second-hand shop but had now disappeared.

The subsequent sections follow Gyuri in his obsessive quest to track down the umbrella. The trail eventually leads him to Glogova; but before he arrives there, he meets a young girl, Veronica, and hears of her 'miraculous' red umbrella. Gyuri decides that the only way he can lay hands on his inheritance is to marry Veronica. She accepts him and he has the blessing of the parish priest, her brother. But the plan is thwarted when he discovers that the villagers of Glogova had paid to have the umbrella's wooden handle replaced with a more fitting silver one, and the old handle had been burnt: Gyuri's inheritance is lost. But with the loss comes the realisation that he wants to marry Veronica for who she is, not to gain possession of his inheritance.

== Film adaptations ==
The novel has been adapted for the screen on three occasions: a 1917 silent version St. Peter's Umbrella directed by Alexander Korda, a 1935 sound film St. Peter's Umbrella by Géza von Cziffra and a 1958 film St. Peter's Umbrella co-directed by Frigyes Bán and Vladislav Pavlovic.
