= Antal Szerb =

Hungarian scholar and writer (1901–1945)

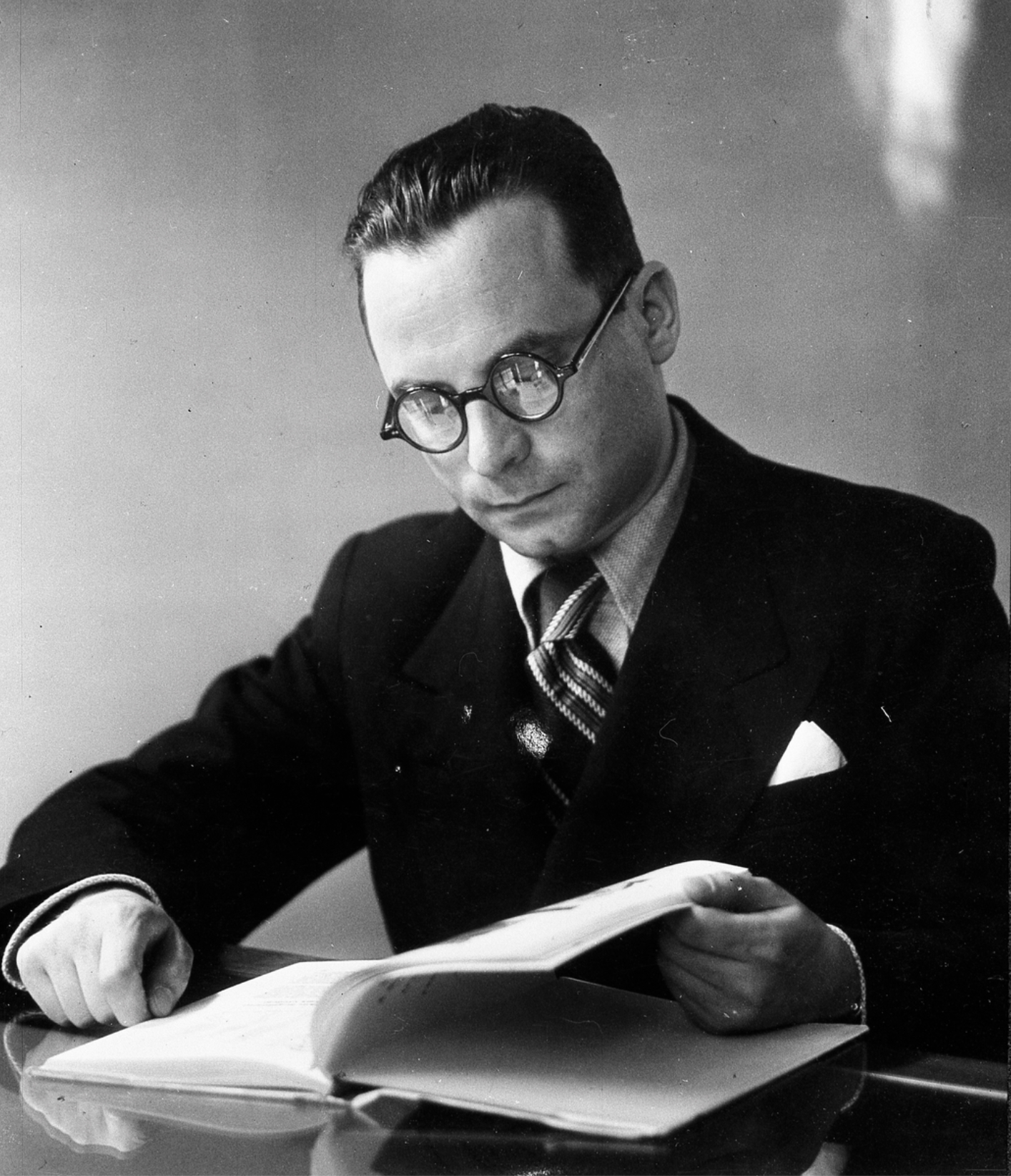
- Antal Szerb in 1935
- Born: 1 May 1901; Budapest, Austria-Hungary (now Hungary)
- Died: 27 January 1945 (aged 43); Balf, Kingdom of Hungary (now Hungary)
- Resting place: Fiume Road Graveyard, Budapest
- Education: Piarist Gymnasium, Budapest Royal Hungarian Pázmány Péter University
- Occupations: Writer, literary historian, scholar, critic, translator, lecturer
- Spouse(s): Amália Lakner (m. 1925–1928; 1932–1933), Klára Bálint (m. 1938–1945)
- Children: Judit Szerb
- Relatives: Károly Szerb (father); Elza Herzfeld (mother)
- Writing career
- Pen name: A. H. Redcliff
- Genres: fiction, historical fiction
- Notable works: A Pendragon legenda (1934); Utas és holdvilág (1937); A világirodalom története (1941); VII. Olivér (1942)
- Notable awards: Baumgarten Prize (1935); Hungarian Heritage Award (2007, posthumous)

Antal Szerb (1 May 1901 – 27 January 1945) was a noted Hungarian scholar and writer. He is generally considered to be one of the most important Hungarian writers of the 20th century.

== Life and career ==
Szerb was born on 1 May 1901 to assimilated Jewish parents in Budapest, but baptized Catholic. He studied Hungarian, German and later English, obtaining a doctorate in 1924. From 1924 to 1929 he lived in France and Italy, also spending a year in London, England, from 1929 to 1930.

As a student, he published essays on Georg Trakl and Stefan George, and quickly established a formidable reputation as a scholar, writing erudite studies of William Blake and Henrik Ibsen among other works. Elected President of the Hungarian Literary Academy in 1933, aged just 32, he published his first novel, The Pendragon Legend (which draws upon his personal experience of living in Britain) the following year. His second and best-known work, Utas és holdvilág (Journey by Moonlight) came out in 1937. He was made a Professor of Literature at the University of Szeged the same year. He was twice awarded the Baumgarten Prize, in 1935 and 1937. Szerb also translated books from English, French, and Italian, including works by Anatole France, P. G. Wodehouse, and Hugh Walpole.

In 1941 he published a History of World Literature which continues to be authoritative today. He also published a volume on the theory of the novel and a book about the history of Hungarian literature. Given numerous chances to escape anti-Semitic persecution (as late as 1944), he chose to remain in Hungary, where his last novel, a Pirandellian fantasy about a king staging a coup against himself, then having to impersonate himself, Oliver VII, was published in 1942. It was passed off as a translation from the English, as no 'Jewish' work could be printed at the time.

During the 1940s, Szerb faced increasing hostility due to his Jewish background. In 1943, Szerb's History of World Literature was put on a list of forbidden works. During the period of Communist rule, it would also be censored, with the chapter on Soviet literature redacted, and the full version would only be available again in 1990. Szerb was deported to a concentration camp in Balf, Hungary late in 1944. Admirers of his attempted to save him with falsified papers, but Szerb turned them down, wanting to share the fate of his generation. He was beaten to death there on 27 January 1945, at the age of 43. He was survived by his wife, Klára Bálint, who died in 1992.

== Works ==
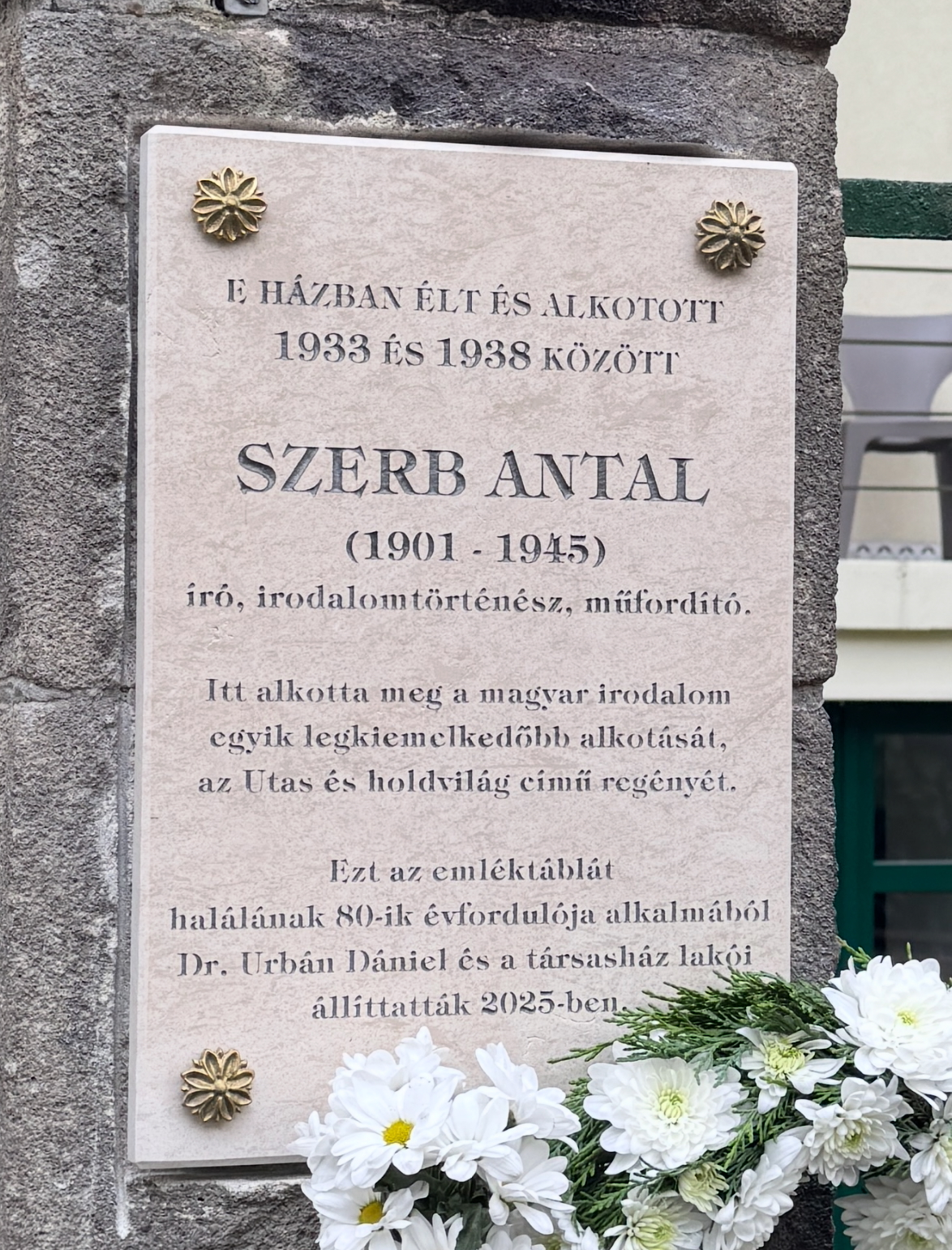
Plaque commemorating that Antal Szerb lived and worked in this house on Torockó Street, Budapest, 1933 - 1938

Szerb is best known for his academic works on literature. In the ten years before the Second World War, he wrote two monumental works of literary criticism, characterized by a brilliant and ironic style intended for an educated reader rather than an academic public.

In addition, Szerb wrote novellas and novels that still attract the attention of the reading public. The Pendragon Legend, Journey by Moonlight and The Queen's Necklace, for instance, fuse within the plot the aims of the literary critic with the aims of the novel writer. The author gives importance to the exotic in these novels, with a meta-literary outlook. In these three novels, the stage of the narrative action is always a Western European country: leaving quotidian Hungary allows the writer to transfigure the actions of his characters.

=== The Pendragon Legend ===
In his first novel, The Pendragon Legend, Szerb offers to his readers a representation of the United Kingdom and its inhabitants. England and, in particular, London, hosted Szerb for a year and not only suggested to him new and interesting directions for his research, but also offered him the background for his first novel. The Pendragon Legend is a detective story that begins in the British Museum and finishes in a Welsh castle. The author provides a non-native's look at the country, in a way that is consistent with the parody genre.

In The Quest for the Miraculous: Survey and Problematic in the Modern Novel, Szerb claims that among the literary genres he prefers the fantasy novel. It fuses the quotidian details of everyday life with the fantastic feats that he calls “the miracle”. In the case of The Pendragon Legend, this allows the reader a cathartic experience through the adventures of the Hungarian philologist who serves as the protagonist of the novel.

=== Journey by Moonlight ===
Utas és holdvilág (literally, "Traveler and Moonlight", translated as Journey by Moonlight to English), published in 1937, focuses on the development of the main character, Mihály - a bright and romantic, albeit conflicted, young man who sets off for a honeymoon in Italy with his new wife, Erzsi. Mihály quickly reveals his bizarre childhood experiences to her over a bottle of wine, alluding to a set of seemingly unresolved longings for eroticism and death which Erzsi seems to only vaguely comprehend. The plainspoken disharmony between the newlyweds leads to Mihály's detached self-recognition: he is not ready to be Erzsi's husband. He then leaves his wife for his own journey through the Italian countryside and eventually Rome - figuratively tracing the sparkling fanaticisms of his juvenile imagination, even rekindling bonds with changed (and some unchanged) childhood friends - all among the impressive foreign landscapes and peculiar liveliness of its inhabitants. Szerb celebrates the exotic cult of Italy, the leitmotif of thousands of writers from the past and present, relaying his own travel impressions of Italy through the mind of his eccentric protagonist, Mihály. Szerb explores the altogether interrelatedness of love and youthfulness within bourgeois society.

=== The Third Tower ===
Szerb also published a diary, The Third Tower, recounting his travels to the cities in the north of Italy - Venice, Bologna, Ravenna. Before going back home, he visited San Marino, Europe's oldest state, and Montale inspired the title of the book. The diary is divided into paragraphs which alternate descriptions with his personal thoughts.

== Selected bibliography ==
- A magyar újromantikus dráma, 1927
- A harmadik torony, 1936
- Az udvari ember, 1927
- William Blake, 1928
- Az angol irodalom kistükre, 1929 ("An Outline of English Literature")
- Az ihletett költő, 1929
- Magyar preromantika, 1929
- Vörösmarty-tanulmányok, 1929
- Cynthia, 1932
- A magyar irodalom története, 1934 ("History of Hungarian literature")
- A Pendragon-legenda, 1934
  - tr.: The Pendragon Legend, ISBN 1-901285-60-X, 2006
- Szerelem a palackban, 1935 (short stories)
  - tr.: Love in a Bottle, ISBN 978-1-906548-28-5, 2010
- Budapesti útikalauz marslakók számára, 1935
  - tr.: A Martian's Guide to Budapest, ISBN 978-963-14-3329-6, 2015
- A harmadik torony, 1936
  - tr.: The Third Tower: Journeys in Italy, ISBN 978-178-22-7053-9, 2014
- Hétköznapok és csodák, 1936 ("The Quest for the Miraculous: Survey and Problematic in the Modern Novel")
- Utas és holdvilág, 1937
  - tr.: The Traveler translated by Peter Hargitai, Püski-Corvin Press NY, NY, USA. 1994. ISBN 0-595-278-78-7
  - tr.: Journey by Moonlight, ISBN 1-901285-50-2, 2014
- Don't say... but say..., 1939
- A világirodalom története, 1941 ("History of World Literature")
- VII. Olivér, 1943 ("Oliver VII," published under the pseudonym A. H. Redcliff)
  - tr.: Oliver VII ISBN 978-1-901285-90-1, 2007
- A királyné nyaklánca, 1943
  - tr.: The Queen's Necklace, ISBN 978-1-906548-08-7, 2009
- Száz vers, 1943/1944 ("100 poems")

== Translations ==
English

- The Traveler (1994) ISBN 9780915951215 (earliest translation of Utas és holdvilág), Translator: Peter Hargitai
- Journey by Moonlight (2002) ISBN 1906548501, 9781906548506 Translator: Len Rix
- The Pendragon Legend (2006) ISBN 1-901285-60-X (another translation published 1963)
- Oliver VII (2007) ISBN 978-1-901285-90-1
- The Queen's Necklace (2009) ISBN 978-1-906548-08-7 Translator: Len Rix
- Love in a Bottle (2010) ISBN 978-1-906548-28-5
- The Third Tower: Journeys in Italy (2014) ISBN 978-178-22-7053-9 Translator: Len Rix
- A Martian's Guide to Budapest (2015) ISBN 978-963-14-3329-6 Translator: Len Rix
- Traveler and the Moonlight (2016) ISBN 978-1-4917-8928-5

Szerb's books were also translated into Czech, Dutch, Finnish, French, German, Hebrew, Italian, Polish, Slovak, Slovenian, Spanish, Serbian, Swedish and Turkish.

== See also ==
- Jacob Sager Weinstein
