= Kálmán Mikszáth =

Hungarian writer and politician (1847–1910)

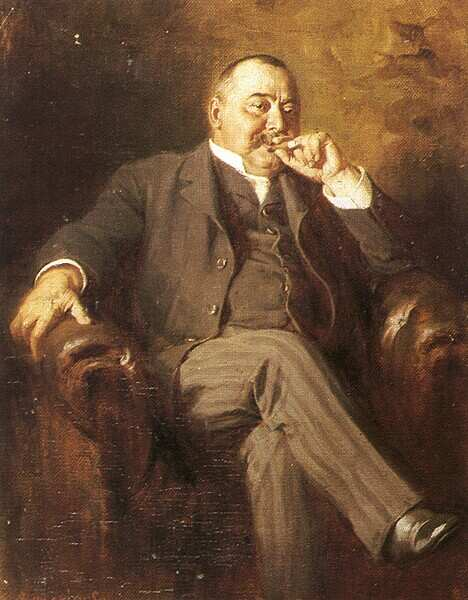
Kálmán Mikszáth; portrait by Gyula Benczúr (1910)

Kálmán Mikszáth de Kiscsoltó (16 January 1847 – 28 May 1910) was a widely reputed Hungarian novelist, journalist, and politician. His work remains in print in Hungarian and still appears from time to time in other languages.

== Biography ==
Mikszáth was born in Szklabonya (also known as Sklabiná or Szlabonya), (Note: In parentheses are official names valid and used in 1808–1863) Upper Hungary (now Sklabiná, Slovakia) into a family of the lesser nobility. He studied law at the University of Budapest from 1866 to 1869, although he did not apply for any exam, and became involved in journalism, writing for many Hungarian newspapers including the Pesti Hírlap.

Mikszáth's early short stories were based on the lives of peasants and artisans and had little appeal at the time. However, they demonstrated his skill in crafting humorous anecdotes, which would be developed in his later, more popular works. Many of his novels contained social commentary and satire, and towards the end of his life they became increasingly critical of the aristocracy and the burden he believed the latter placed on Hungarian society.

Mikszáth was a member of the Liberal Party, and in 1887 was elected to the Diet of Hungary (one of the two top legislatures in Austria-Hungary). Until 1879 he was the representative for the Illyefalva District in Transylvania, and from 1892 until his death he represented the Fogaras District. During his time in the Diet, he lived at Dohnányi utca 28 in central Budapest.

In 1910, the village he was born was renamed Mikszáthfalva during his 40th annual writer's jubilee.

Kálmán Mikszáth was buried in Kerepesi Cemetery in Budapest, alongside his sons János (1886–1890) and Albert (1889–1921).

== Reception ==
U.S. President Theodore Roosevelt enjoyed his novel St. Peter's Umbrella so much that he visited Mikszáth solely to express his admiration, during a European trip in 1910.

Mikszáth's work remains popular in Hungary and has been translated sporadically into other languages. The translation of St. Peter's Umbrella was published in 2012, 2018 and 2019. The Siege of Beszterce was republished in English in 2014 and The Town in Black (A fekete város, 1911) appeared in 2011.

== Selected works ==
- The Slovak Relations (1881)
- The Good People of Palocz (1882) (hyperlinked on 20 January 2021)
- Anna Bede's Debt
- The Grass of Lohina (1885)
- Two Beggar-Students (1886)
- The Postmaster General (1886)
- The Magic Caftan (1889)
- St. Peter's Umbrella (1895)
- The Siege of Beszterce (1896), adapted as an opera by Ján Cikker
- The Gentry (1897)
- Two Elections in Hungary (1896 and 1899)
- New Zrínyiád (1898)
- A Strange Marriage (1900)
- The Women of Szelistye (1901)
- The Young Noszty's Affair with Mari Tóth (1908)
- The Town in Black (1908–1910, set in the town of Lőcse)
