= Mathias Sandorf =

1885 adventure book by Jules Verne

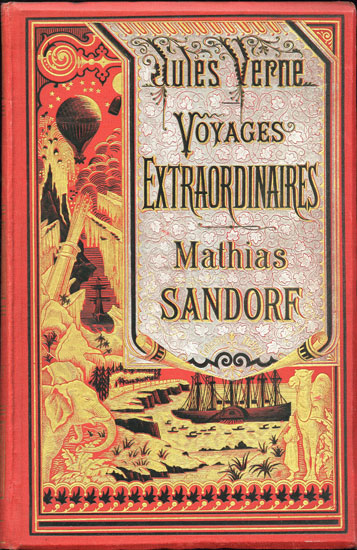
- Hetzel first edition cover
- Author: Jules Verne
- Original title: Mathias Sandorf
- Illustrator: Léon Benett
- Language: French
- Series: The Extraordinary Voyages #27
- Genre: Adventure novel
- Publisher: Pierre-Jules Hetzel
- Publication date: 1885
- Publication place: France
- English publication date: 1885; First unabridged edition 2007, ROH Press
- Media type: Print (Hardback)
- Preceded by: The Archipelago on Fire
- Followed by: The Lottery Ticket

Mathias Sandorf is an 1885 adventure book by the French writer Jules Verne first serialized in Le Temps in 1885. It employs many of the devices that had served well in his earlier novels: islands, cryptograms, surprise revelations of identity, technically advanced hardware and a solitary figure bent on revenge. Verne planned Mathias Sandorf as the Mediterranean adventure of his series of novels called Voyages extraordinaires. He dedicated the novel to the memory of Alexandre Dumas.

== Overview ==
In Trieste in 1867, two petty criminals, Sarcany and Zirone, discover a carrier pigeon bearing a ciphered message. Locating the recipient of the cipher, they devise a plan to take advantage of their discovery. Sarcany tells Silas Toronthal, a corrupt banker, that he suspects the cipher is part of a plot to liberate Hungary from Habsburg-Austrian rule. Together they form a plan to unlock the cipher and deliver the evidence to the police in exchange for a reward. The three Hungarian conspirators, Count Mathias Sandorf, Stephen Bathory and Ladislas Zathmar (in their Hungarian form: Sándor Mátyás, Báthory István and Szatmári László) are arrested and sentenced to death. They plot an escape, but Zathmar is captured while trying to escape and Bathory is apprehended the next night. Both are executed. Sandorf flees the police and jumps into the Adriatic where he is assumed drowned.

Fifteen years later, Sandorf, who has survived and taken on the identity of Dr. Antekirtt, a renowned physician, sets out to avenge his friends. Enlisting the aid of two French carnival performers, Pescade and Matifou, he searches the Mediterranean for those who engineered the betrayal of his planned uprising. Wealthy and powerful, he rules an island fortress filled with advanced weaponry. He devotes his life to exacting justice from those whose greed brought his friends to their death.

== In the context of Verne's work ==
In the generation after Dumas, Jules Verne wrote a number of Wanderer adventures. Three of the most notable, Michael Strogoff, The Steam House (La Maison à vapeur) and Mathias Sandorf, are set in three of Europe's great Empires: the Russian, the British (in India), and the Austrian. Their plots and themes have a good deal in common, as Jean-Yves Tadié points out. Each one is about the empire's political troubles, each features a pursuer who is himself pursued, each has a trio of characters at its centre, and each eschews granting a major role to machinery, a common feature of Verne's novels.

== Background of the novel ==
Verne's book begins on May 18, 1867, as preparations for the rising in Hungary are said to be almost complete. The date reflects historical events: on May 29, 1867, the Diet of Hungary ratified the Austro-Hungarian Compromise of 1867, shelving their demand for full independence from Austrian rule to gain instead considerable autonomy within the Austro-Hungarian Empire..

Though the compromise is not mentioned, chronology suggests that the Hungarian conspirators aim to frustrate this ratification, seize control of Hungary's urban centers, and declare Hungary independent, gambling that Austria, enfeebled by its recent defeat in the Austro-Prussian War, would accept this fait accompli. Verne's readers would expect this conspiracy to fail in the novel's early chapters. The novel also provides a critique of imperial administration: the Austrian police act in complete secrecy to arrest, court-martial and execute the radical Hungarians.

Verne said that Sandorf was modeled on his publisher, Pierre-Jules Hetzel, a former exile and a fervent patriot with a high moral sense. Dr Antekirtt appears based on Hetzel and his friend Nino Bixio. Others see similarities with the Hungarian freedom fighter Lajos Kossuth, who remained unreconciled to the 1867 compromise and Austrian prince Ludwig Salvator.

The action moves from Trieste down the Adriatic coast to Sicily and the shores of North Africa. Verne wrote: "I wish my readers to learn everything they should know about the Mediterranean, which is why the action transports them to twenty different places". Verne based some of the locations on own travels, including a rescue during a storm off Malta and visits to Catania and Mount Etna. Verne researched the Italian landscape by rereading some of Stendhal's works, notably Promenades in Rome and The Charterhouse of Parma. Verne may have first heard about the foiba beneath the Pisino Castle in Charles Yriarte's works Les Bords de l'Adriatique and Trieste e l'Istria. Yriatre described the old castle and a trip down into the gorge. He also mentioned a young nobleman, Count Esdorff, who lost his life trying to explore the underground parts of a river.

The first edition was dedicated to Alexandre Dumas. Dumas' son was so moved by the love expressed in the dedication that he wrote a letter to Verne: "I've been loving you for so long that I feel like your brother". He said that in literature Verne is Dumas' son more than he himself.

The steam yacht of doctor Antekirtt, Savarena, is an accurate portrait of Verne's own steam yacht, which he bought from the eccentric millionaire the Marquis de Préaulx for 60,000 F.

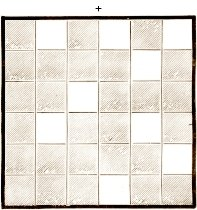
A model of the grating employed in creating and reading the cipher in the novel

The novel has inspired discussions of ciphers.

Verne also provided a critique of gambling, mocking those who engage in games of chance in Monaco and citing mathematical expertise against it.

== Publication ==
The novel was serialized in 42 chapters in Le Temps, a Parisian daily, between 16 June and 20 September 1885.

The original French-language edition in a single volume included 111 illustrations by Léon Benett. It was published on 19 November 1885.

George Hanna produced the first English translation in 1889.

ROH Press, which specializes in adventure novels, published a revised version of Hanna's translation by Nico Lorenzutti in 2014.

== Adaptations ==
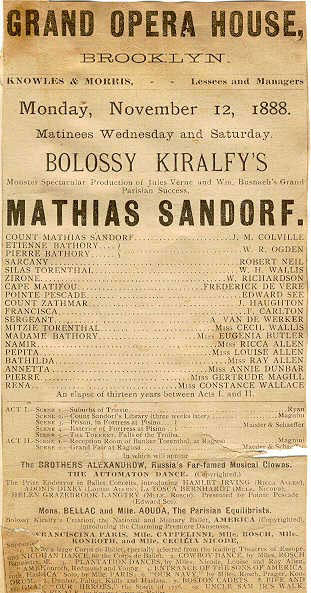
Poster for Bolossy Kiralfy's 1888 theatrical adaptation

Mathias Sandorf was adapted for the stage as a five-act play by Georges Maurens and William Bertrand Busnach, a French novelist and playwright who adopted several novels for the theater. It premiered at the Théâtre de l'Ambigu-Comique on 27 November 1887.

A stage production was presented at The Boston Theatre in Boston in the fall of 1888 and at Niblo's Garden in New York City in August 1888, a production imported by impresario Bolossy Kiralfy. The New York Times reported: "The spirit and vigor and fancy of a Jules Verne romance are not easily reproduced on the stage, and in this case there has been no attempt to do more than furnish a vehicle for the display of spectacular effects." It employed the scenery, costumes, and effects of the Paris production.

A two-act stage musical in Hungarian was performed in 2022/23 under the Hungarian title Sándor Mátyàs at the Hungarian Opera of Cluj in Cluj-Napoca, Romania.

There have also been three film adaptations of Mathias Sandorf. Henri Fescourt directed a silent Mathias Sandorf in 1921. It starred Yvette Andréyor, Romuald Joubé, Jean Toulout, and in the US it was titled The Prisoner of Zorda. Under that title Verne's son Michel Verne created a novel based on the film. Georges Lampin directed another Mathias Sandorf in 1963 starring Louis Jourdan, Francisco Rabal, Renaud Mary and Serena Vergano.

An internationally co-produced television miniseries aired in 1979. Different versions divided the series into four or six episodes. Directed by Jean-Pierre Decourt it starred Hungarian actor István Bujtor as Mathias Sandorf, Ivan Desny as Zathmar, Amadeus August, Claude Giraud, Monika Peitsch, Sissy Höfferer, and Jacques Breuer.
