= Ágnes Csomor =

Hungarian actress (born 1979)

- Born: 13 June 1979; Budapest, Hungary
- Other name: Ági Csomor
- Occupation: Actress
- Years active: 2000–present
- Children: Emese (2008–)
- Website: Ági Csomor

Ágnes "Ági" Csomor (Hungarian: [ˈaːgnɛʃ ˈaːgi ˈt͡ʃomor]; born June 13, 1979) is a Hungarian stage, film and television actress. Currently, she is starring in the Hungarian television soap opera Barátok közt (in English: Among Friends) running on RTL Klub as antagonist Oravecz Nikol, a character who became the boss of a drug cartel after arresting her brother while raising her teenage son who's opposing his mother's underworld connections.

== Life ==
Csomor was born on 13 June 1979 in Budapest but was raised at Bicske. She graduated from the Vajda János Secondary Grammar School at Bicske in 1997. She took a degree at the GNM School of Dramatic Art headed by Hungarian actress Mária Gór Nagy (in Hungarian: GNM /Gór Nagy Mária/ Színitanoda) in 2001. After her graduation in the school of dramatic art she started to teach in the acting classes for kids (GNM Tinitanoda). She played at National Theatre of Szeged from 2001 until 2006. In 2012 she became the art director and bursar of the acting classes for kids in GNM School of Dramatic Art in Szeged.

She played with Hungarian film stars like Ferenc Zenthe, István Bujtor, Géza Tordy and András Kern in the TV series Komédiások (Comedians) as Éva Pereszlényi, the illegitimate daughter of Balázs Boday, who is the fictional character of the director of National Theatre of Győr starring István Bujtor.

From 2014 she is starring in the Hungarian television soap opera Barátok közt (in English: Among Friends) running on RTL Klub as antagonist Nikol Oravecz. She has only daughter, Emese.

== Selected stage roles ==
- Franz Lehár: The Merry Widow (Olga; Praskowia)
- Luigi Pirandello: Six Characters in Search of an Author (Stepdaughter)
- Béla Zsolt: Nemzeti drogéria (National Drugstore/Pharmacy) (Boris)
- Carlo Collodi: The Adventures of Pinocchio (Butterfly)
- Shakespeare: A Midsummer Night's Dream (Fairy)
- Shakespeare: As You Like It
- Peter Shaffer: Equus (Jill Mason)
- Michel Tremblay: Les Belles-sœurs (Lise Paquette)
- Andersen–Zsolt Pozsgai: The Snow Queen (The Tame Crow)

== Filmography ==
- Barátok közt (Among Friends; TV series) (in the role of Nikol Oravecz) – 2014
- Komédiások (Comedians; TV series) (in the role of Éva Pereszlényi) – 2000
