= Do not Panic, Major Kardos =

1982 film

- Directed by: István Bujtor; Sándor Szönyi G.
- Starring: István Bujtor; András Kern
- Release date: 19 August 1982
- Running time: 1h 27min
- Country: Hungary
- Language: Hungarian

Do not Panic, Major Kardos (Hungarian: Csak semmi pánik...) is a 1982 Hungarian comedy film, sequel of The Pagan Madonna.

== Cast ==
- István Bujtor - Ötvös Csöpi
- András Kern - Dr. Kardos
- László Bánhidi - Matuska
- Gyula Bodrogi - Boros
- Gábor Koncz - gangster boss
- József Székhelyi - Pötyi
- Đoko Rosić (uncredited) − Alex/Heinrich Romfeld
