= Pozsgai =

Pozsgai is a Hungarian surname. People with this surname include:

- Tamás Pozsgai, Hungarian professional ice hockey player
- Zsolt Pozsgai, Hungarian freelance writer, playwright, stage and film director, and film producer

== See also ==
- Pozsgay
