= Hungarian Golf Federation =

Sports governing body in Hungary

The Hungarian Golf Federation (Hungarian: Magyar Golf Szövetség) is Hungary's national association of golf courses, clubs and facilities, a member of the International Golf Federation, also authorized by the United States Golf Association. It was founded in 1990 and had about 1200 members in 2007. The Federation organizes open days to advertise the game.

In a 2007 SWOT analysis the Federation summarized the situation of golf in Hungary today.

In 2019, Ádám Kása, who has since turned professional and competes on the Alps Tour, Pro Golf Tour and the Stella Artois Swiss Pro Series (currently 6th on the Order of Merit, was the highest ranked Hungarian Amateur golfer from Hungary over the 2019 season on the European Golf Rankings and plans to be the first Hungarian born golfer to compete at the Olympics.
