= Fodi =

Fodi may refer to:

== People ==
- John Fodi (1944–2009), Hungarian composer and music librarian
- Viktória Fődi (1886–1940), Hungarian criminal

== Other ==
- Festival of Dangerous Ideas
