= Bloody Friday (film) =

1972 film

- German film poster
- German: Blutiger Freitag
- Directed by: Rolf Olsen
- Screenplay by: Valeria Bonamano; Rolf Olsen; Fernando Di Leo
- Story by: Valeria Bonamano; Rolf Olsen; Fernando Di Leo
- Starring: Raimund Harmstorf; Amadeus August; Gianni Macchia
- Cinematography: Franz X. Lederle
- Edited by: Amedeo Giomini; Eva Zeyn
- Music by: Francesco De Masi
- Production companies: Lisa Film; Cineproduzioni Daunia 70
- Distributed by: Gloria Film (Germany); Alpherat (Italy)
- Release dates: 8 May 1972 (West Germany); 6 February 1973 (Italy)
- Running time: 97 minutes
- Countries: West Germany; Italy

Bloody Friday (German: Blutiger Freitag) is a 1972 crime film directed by Rolf Olsen and starring Raimund Harmstorf, Amadeus August, and Gianni Macchia.

It was shot on location in Munich and other parts of Bavaria.

== Plot ==
After escaping from a courtroom during his trial, a major criminal plans the biggest bank robbery ever to have taken place in the country.

== Main cast ==
- Raimund Harmstorf as Heinz Klett
- Amadeus August as Christian Hofbauer
- Gianni Macchia as Luigi Belloni
- Christine Böhm as Heidi Hofbauer
- Ernst H. Hilbich as Ernst Pylobar
- Gila von Weitershausen as Marion Lotzmann
- Daniela Giordano as Dagmar Neuss
- Walter Buschhoff as Walter Lotzmann
- Renate Roland as Helga Radtke
- Horst Naumann as Dr. Mayer-Lippe
- Totò Mignone as Franz Muhl
- E. O. Fuhrmann as Prosecutor
- Ursula Erber as Irmgard Zukunft
- Werner Heyking as Dr. Eminger

== Production ==
Fernando Di Leo revised the screenplay of the film and is uncredited in the film's credits.

== Release ==
Bloody Friday was released in West Germany where it was distributed by Gloria Film on 8 May 1972. It was distributed in Italy by Alpherat on 6 February 1973 under the title Violenza contro violenza. The film grossed 135,195,000 Italian lire on its theatrical release in Italy.
