= Joanna Bruzdowicz =

Polish composer (1943–2021)

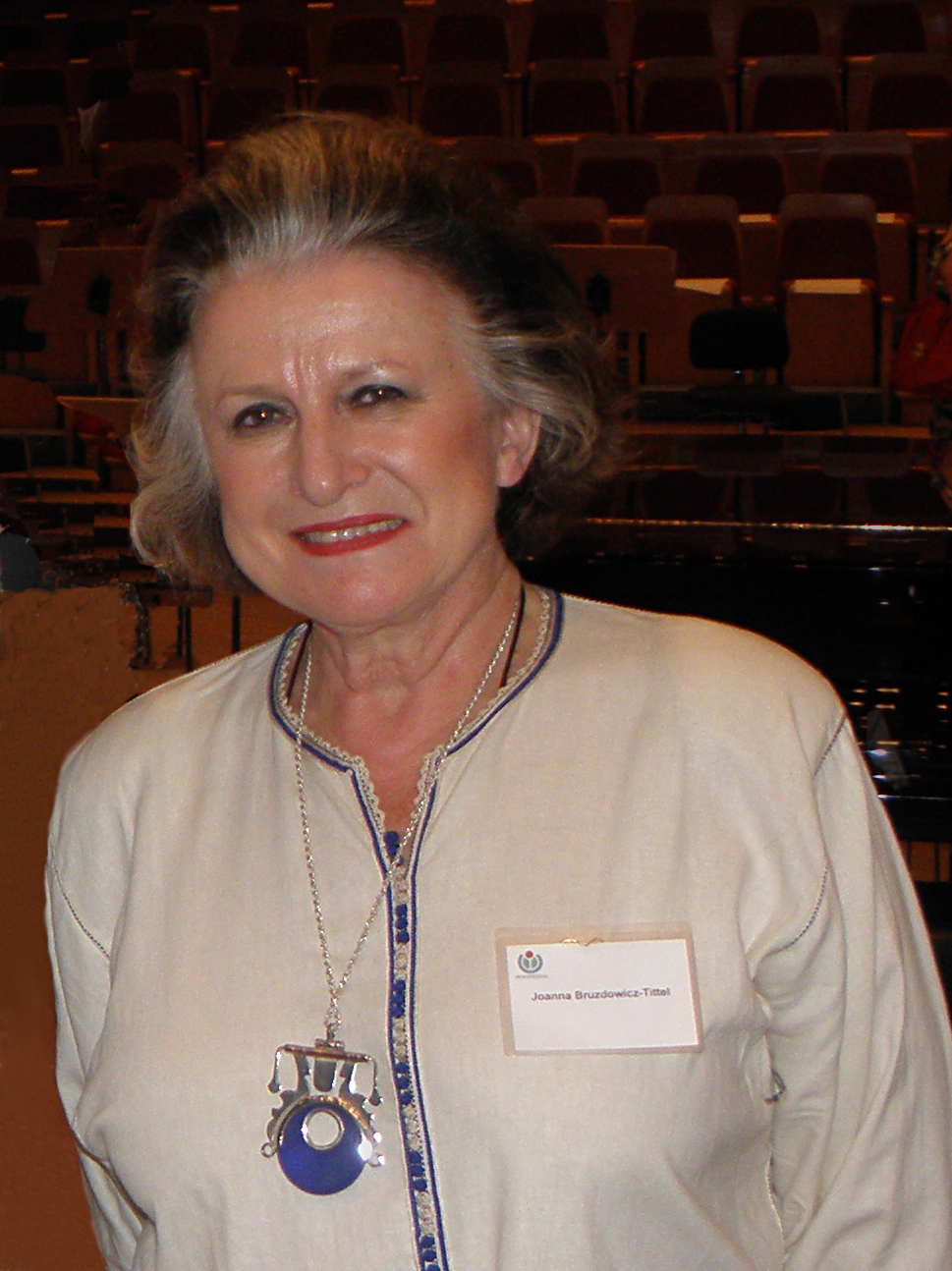
- Bruzdowicz in 2010
- Born: 17 May 1943; Warsaw, Poland
- Died: 3 November 2021 (aged 78); Taillet, France
- Citizenship: Polish
- Occupation(s): Composer, music critic, journalist, and pianist
- Spouse: Horst-Jürgen Tittel
- Children: 3

Joanna Bruzdowicz (17 May 1943 – 3 November 2021) was a Polish composer.

== Life ==
Born in Warsaw, Bruzdowicz studied at the Warsaw Music High School, at the State Higher School of Music (composition with Kazimierz Sikorski and piano with Irena Protasiewicz and Wanda Osakiewicz); she earned her M.A. in 1966. She continued her studies in Paris on a scholarship from the French government and became a student of Nadia Boulanger, Olivier Messiaen and Pierre Schaeffer (1968–70). She joined the electroacoustic Groupe de Recherches Musicales and wrote her doctoral thesis "Mathematics and Logic in Contemporary Music" at the Sorbonne.

After completing her studies in France, she settled in Belgium with her husband, Horst-Jürgen Tittel, former top advisor to the president of the European Commission. Together, they created the 36-episode German TV series Stahlkammer Zürich for which Bruzdowicz wrote over 15 hours of music. They lived in the South of France. They have three sons: Mark, Jan and Jörg Tittel.

== Artistic range ==
As a composer, she devoted her attention to opera, symphonic and chamber music, works for children, and music for film and television. She wrote four concerti and numerous chamber pieces, as well as over 25 hours of film music. Her compositions were featured on 12 CDs and over 20 LPs; she was featured in TV programs produced in Belgium, France, Germany and Poland.

Her output included several operas which brought to the stage some of the greatest works of European literature (e.g. The Penal Colony, after Franz Kafka, 1972; The Women of Troy after Euripides, 1973; and The Gates of Paradise, after Jerzy Andrzejewski, 1987).

Bruzdowicz had a long-standing creative relationship with French film director Agnès Varda, for whom she composed soundtracks for movies from Sans Toit Ni Loi (engl. Vagabond, Golden Lion in Venice, 1985) to Les Glaneurs et la Glaneuse (engl. The Gleaners and I), her multiple award-winning documentary.

More recently, her music could be heard in her second collaboration with director Yves Angelo, Les Ames Grises (engl. The Grey Souls), the last movie starring French comedian Jacques Villeret.

== Selected recordings ==
- Leila oratorio to text by Christiane Schapira

== Film score ==
- 1997: An Air So Pure

== Sources ==
- Joanna Bruzdowicz at IMDb
- Polish Music Center at USC
