= István Bujtor =

Hungarian actor (1942–2009)

- Born: István Frenreisz; 5 May 1942; Budapest, Hungary
- Died: 25 September 2009 (aged 67); Budapest, Hungary
- Occupations: Actor, director, producer, screenplay writer
- Years active: 1964–2009
- Spouse: Eszter Perényi

István Bujtor (5 May 1942 – 25 September 2009), born István Frenreisz, was a Hungarian actor, director, producer and screenplay writer. He starred in the TV mini-series Mathias Sandorf based on the novel Mathias Sandorf by Jules Verne as Mathias Sandorf in 1979.

== Biography ==
Bujtor started his acting career in 1964, and played in more than a hundred Hungarian films. He won the Béla Balázs Award in 1979.

In the early 1980s he became known as the Hungarian dubbing voice of Italian actor Bud Spencer, whose films were highly popular in Hungary at the time. Based on his physical resemblance to Spencer, Bujtor later starred in a series of Hungarian action comedies in the vein of the Bud Spencer-Terence Hill genre, in which he played hard-hitting detective Csöpi Ötvös, partnered with fellow Hungarian actor András Kern.

In January 2008 he became the director of the Petőfi Theatre in Veszprém.

== Personal ==
He was born in Budapest in 1942, as a child of a prestigious family; his grandfather was the legendary restaurant owner and gourmet Károly Gundel, and his siblings were the popular Hungarian actor Zoltán Latinovits (half-brother) and the composer and bass guitarist Károly Frenreisz. Bujtor graduated as an economist in 1965. He was passionate yachtsman winning six Hungarian championships with his yacht Rabonbán, built in 1936.

== Death ==
Bujtor was hospitalized in Veszprém on 31 July 2009, where he fell into a coma. After several weeks of treatment his health status seemingly stabilized and he was transferred to Budapest for rehabilitation. However, he died there on 25 September 2009. The circumstances of his death are currently undisclosed but he was reportedly diagnosed with coccidiosis, kidney failure and septic shock.

== Selected filmography ==
| Year | Title | Role | Notes |
|---|---|---|---|
| 1965 | A Holiday with Piroschka | | |
| 1969 | Those Who Wear Glasses | Valkó László | |
| 1974 | The Pendragon Legend | George Maloney | |
| 1979 | Mathias Sandorf | Mathias Sandorf | TV miniseries |
| 1981 | The Pagan Madonna | Csöpi Ötvös (Note: Hungarian: [øtvøʃ t͡ʃøpi]) | |
| 1982 | Do not Panic, Major Kardos | Csöpi Ötvös | |
| 1986 | Az elvarázsolt dollár ("The Enchanted Dollar") | Csöpi Ötvös | |
| 1991 | Hamis a baba ("Fake doll") | Csöpi Ötvös | |
