= Stahlkammer Zürich =

- Starring: Robert Atzorn (Season 1, 1987); Jacques Breuer (Season 2, 1989); Miroslav Nemec (Season 3, 2001)
- Country of origin: Germany

Stahlkammer Zürich is a German television series.

Polish composer Joanna Bruzdowicz together with her husband, Horst-Jürgen Tittel, former top advisor to the president of the European Commission. Together, they created the soundtrack for this 36-episode series. Bruzdowicz wrote over 15 hours of music for this series.

== See also ==
- List of German television series
