= Quentin Durward (TV series) =

- Genre: Adventure
- Created by: Walter Scott; Novel; Jaques Sommet; Screenplay; Pierre Nivollet; Dialogues
- Starring: Amadeus August; Marie-France Boyer; Georges Marchal
- Theme music composer: Georges Garvarentz
- Opening theme: Georges Garvarentz
- Composer: Georges Garvarentz
- Countries of origin: France; Germany
- Original language: French
- No. of seasons: 1
- No. of episodes: 7

Production
- Executive producers: Roger Van Mullem; Colette Fleury
- Running time: 52
- Production company: Maintenon Films

Original release
- Network: ORTF
- Release: 28 January – 11 March 1971

Quentin Durward is a French-German swashbuckler TV series. It was produced in 1970, directed by Gilles Grangier and broadcast in 1971. The series starred the German actor Amadeus August as the protagonist and the French actress Marie-France Boyer as Isabelle de Croye. The series was based on Sir Walter Scott's in 1823 published novel Quentin Durward. It concerns a Scottish soldier who serves French King Louis XI (1423-1483) while the King has to overcome the schemes of his rival Charles the Bold and Jean Balue. The TV series kept close to the classic novel and was often shot at historic French locations. The French version consists of 7 instalments of 52 minutes each, while the dubbed German version had 13 episodes of about 25 minutes apiece. Both versions have been made available on DVD.

== Storyline ==
In a monastery in Scotland on the day of an ordination to the priesthood, Quentin Durward, a dashing young man of noble background, is about to be consecrated. The monks beseech him to devote his life to God in order to save his life. He is reminded that he would have been dead already if it hadn't been for the monks and their solemn promise to make him one of them. By listening to the monks while they are berating young Quentin, the audience learns that Quentin's clan has been wiped out as the result of a feud. The hostile clan who killed Quentin's kin is determined to put an end to the bloodline one way or the other. Either he takes the oath to live in celibacy or he won't be spared any longer after all. While they raid the monastery he manages to escape his pursuers and to reach the English Channel. He heads for France because his only living relative, his uncle Lludovic Cunningham (played by Noël Roquevert), serves as a member of the Scottish Guard. At the same time Isabelle de Croye, who is also an orphan, secretly leaves the Kingdom of Burgundy in order to elude an arranged marriage and find shelter in France too. They run into each other, fall in love and after many adventures they marry in the Abbey Notre Dame of Morienval.

== Gallery ==
Locations appearing in the series:

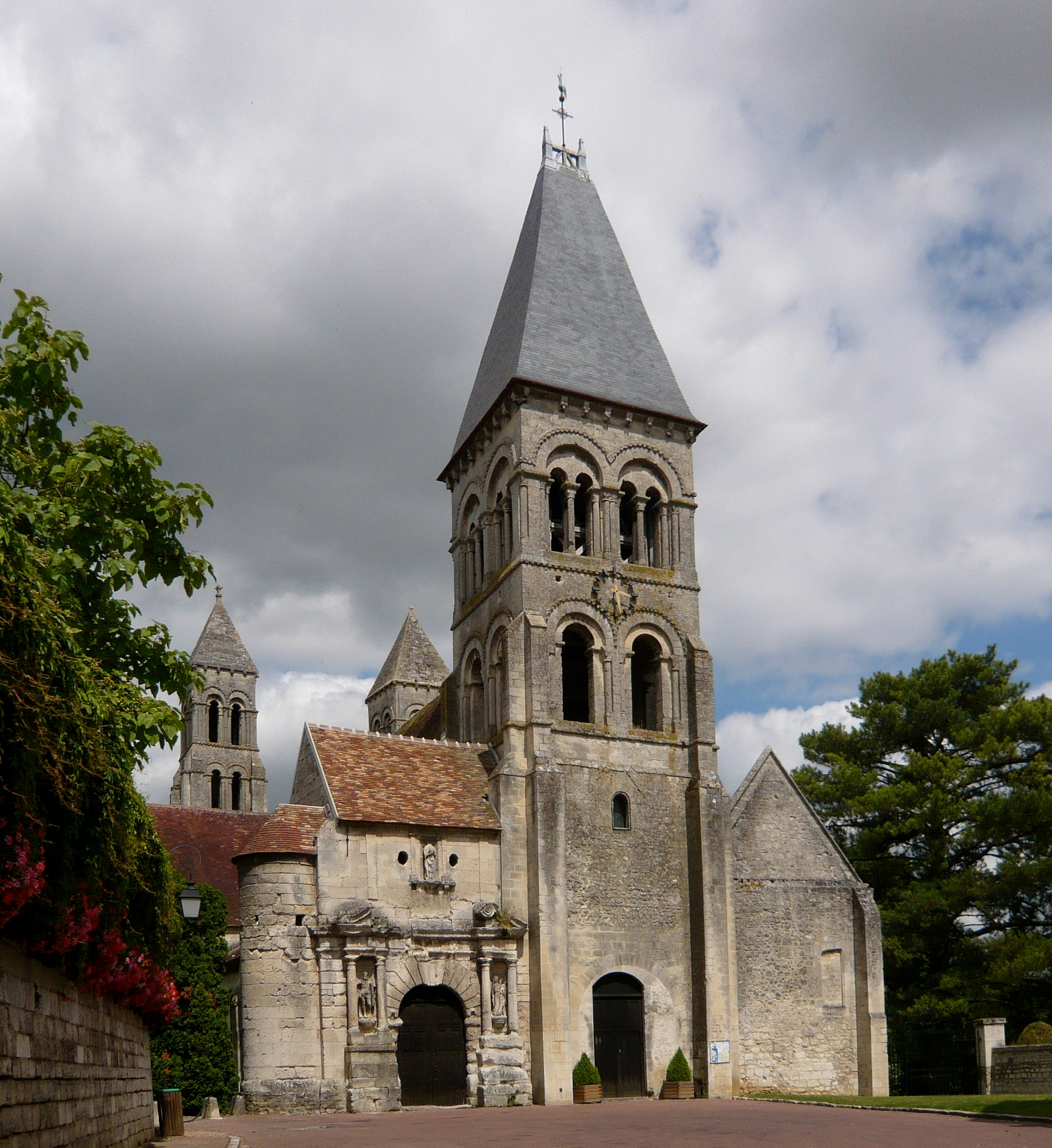
The Abbey Notre Dame of Morienval.

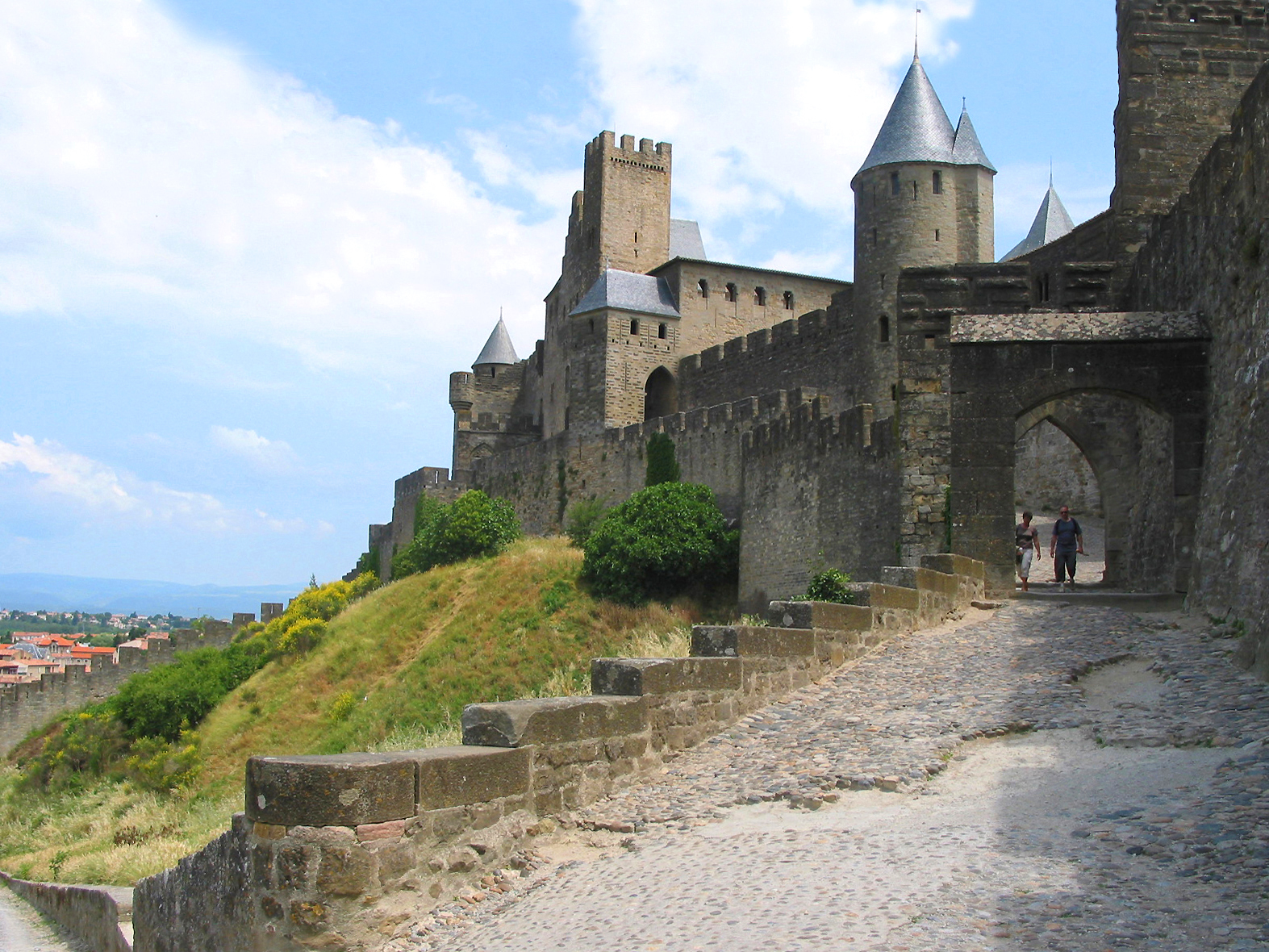
Cité de Carcassonne.

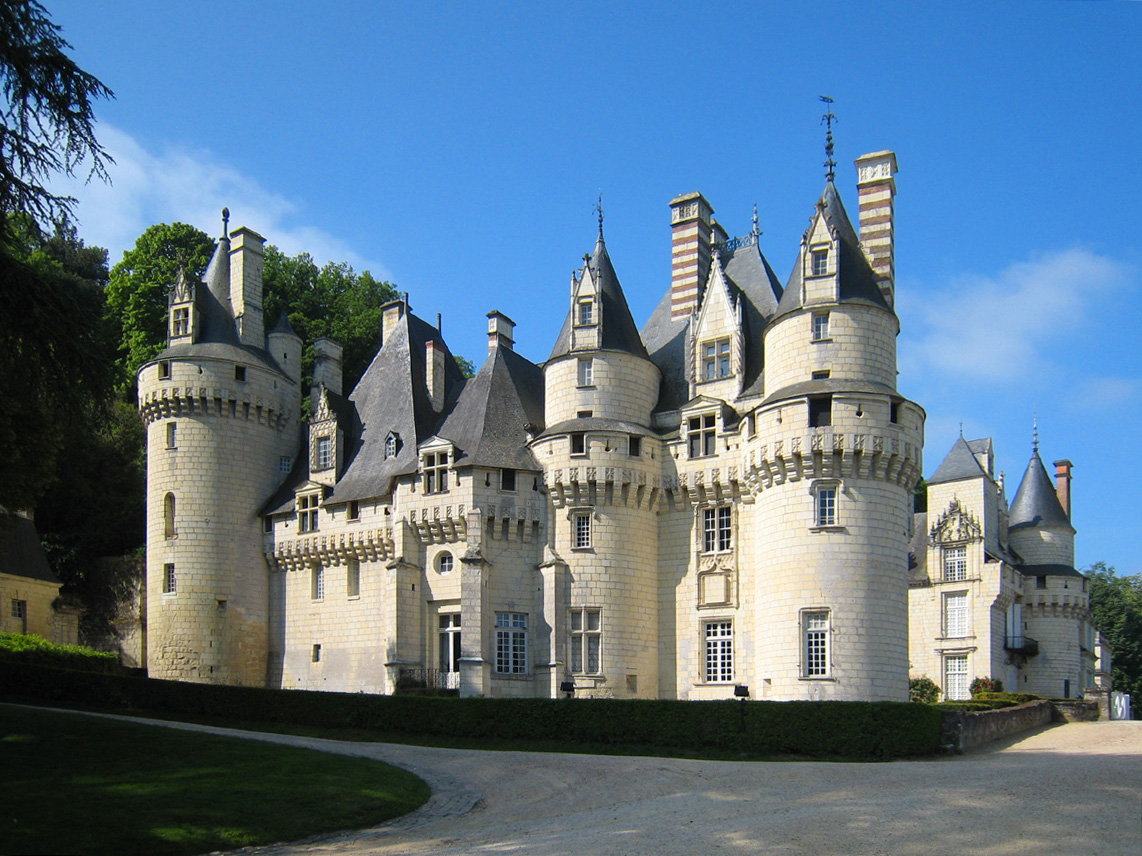
Le Château d'Ussé.

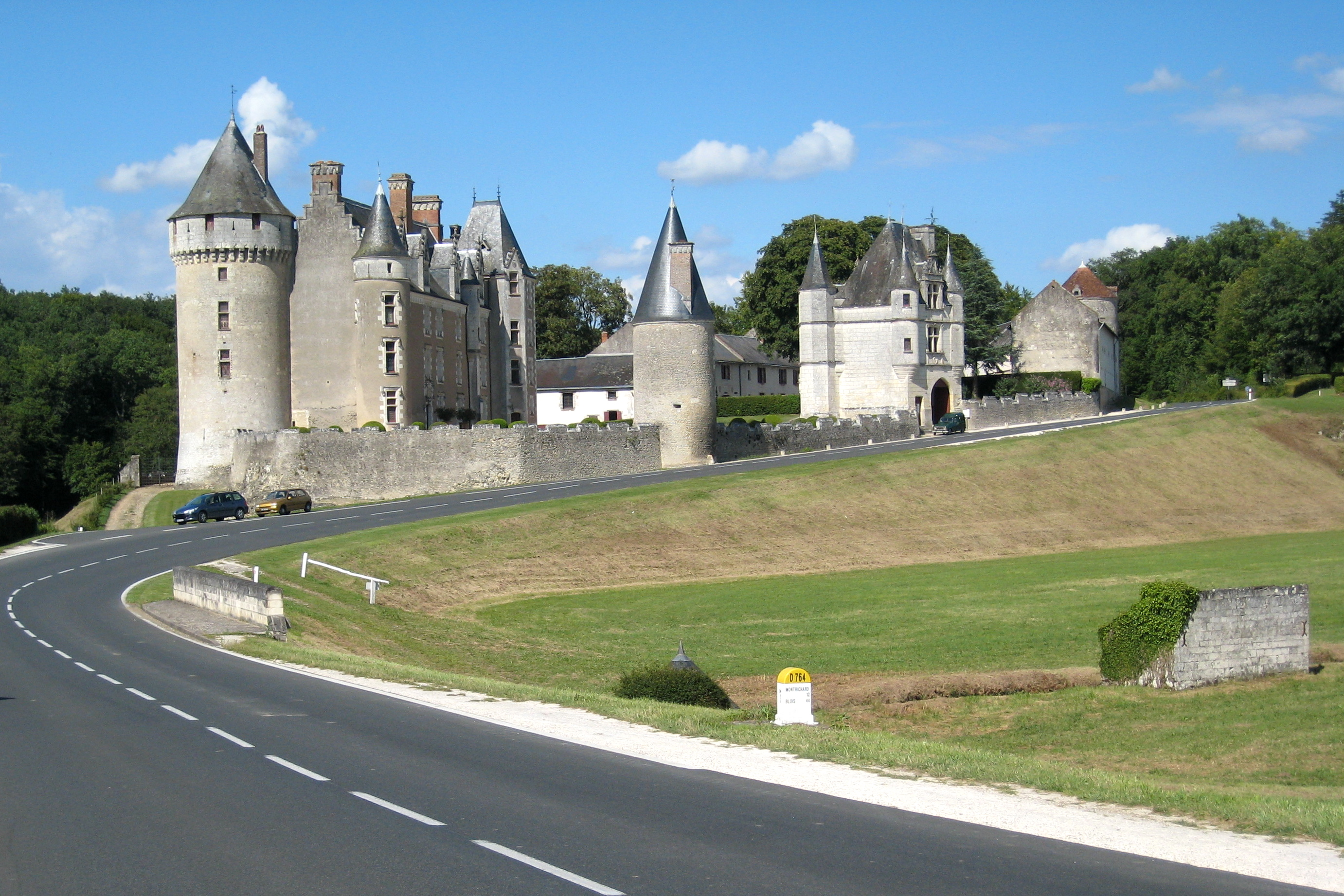
Château de Montpoupon

== Cast ==
- Amadeus August: Quentin Durward
- Marie-France Boyer: Isabelle de Croye
- Noël Roquevert: Ludovic Lesly
- William Sabatier: Charles the Bold
- Michel Vitold: Louis XI
- Roger Pigaut: Jean d'Orléans
- Denis Savignat: Duke of Orléans
- André Valmy: Olivier le Daim
- Robert Party: Comte de Campobasso
- Clarisse Deudon: Harmeline de Croye
- Claire Maurier: Marion
- Philippe Avron: Bertrand
- Georges Marchal: Crèvecœur
- Jacques Monod: Jean Balue
- André Oumansky: Leyradin
- Guy Kerner: Tristan L'Hermite

== See also ==
- The Adventures of Quentin Durward, the 1955 film
