= Marie-France Boyer =

French actress and singer

Marie-France Boyer (born 22 April 1938 in Marseille) is a French actress, singer and the author of many internationally published non-fiction books on France. She appeared from 1959 until 1976 in more than a dozen feature films and several TV shows.

During her career as actress she worked with many directors, among them François Villiers, Henri Verneuil, Agnès Varda, Riccardo Freda, Luc de Heusch, John Krish, and Gilles Grangier.

Marie-France Boyer also had the female leading part in the TV series Quentin Durward, playing Isabelle de Croye, whose fate becomes a subject of dispute between the duke of Burgundy and the king of France. As a part of this role, she sings two medieval songs. Isabelle's beauty and loveliness inspire the protagonist to surpass himself, and when he is finally offered high positions at either ruler's courts, he refuses both because he prefers to live by her side.

In 1967, she participated in screen tests for the search of the new male actor for the figure of James Bond in the film On Her Majesty's Secret Service.
