= Pipás Pista =

Hungarian murderer and suspected serial killer

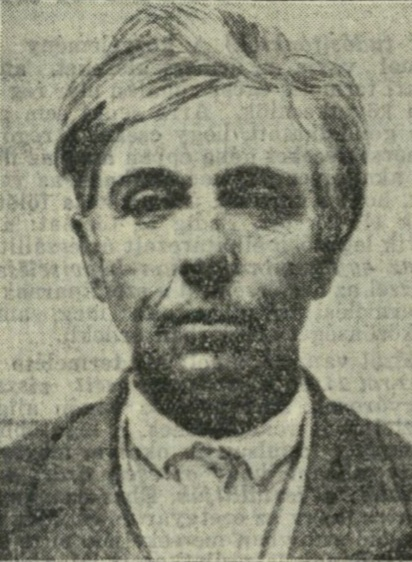
- Born: February 23, 1882; Szeged, Austria-Hungary
- Died: October 10, 1940 (aged 58); Csillag Prison, Szeged, Kingdom of Hungary
- Other name: Viktória Fődi
- Conviction: Murder x2
- Penalty: Death; commuted to life imprisonment

Details
- Victims: 2–30+
- Span of crimes: 1919 – 1922 (known)
- Country: Hungary
- State: Csongrád-Csanád
- Date apprehended: 1932

Viktória Fődi (February 23, 1882 – October 10, 1940), better known by his nickname Pipás Pista ("Pipe-smoking Steve"), was a Hungarian murderer and suspected serial killer responsible for at least two killings in Szeged in 1919 and 1922. A controversial, almost mythical figure in both contemporary and modern Hungary, he has been the subject of many books, plays and films dedicated to his case.

== Early life ==
Many conflicting accounts exist about Fődi's past, making it hard to distinguish which claims are fact and which are fiction. According to most, he was born circa 1886 in Szeged to impoverished farmers Lukács Fődi and Mária Tómbacz, but lived in and around Tompa for the majority of his life. His father was regarded as a violent alcoholic who frequently maltreated his family, leaving his young child with a great resentment towards men who acted like him. At the age of 13, in order to alleviate their debts, Fődi's parents sold him to work as a housemaid in Turócszentmárton, where he would pick up smoking as a regular habit. According to some reports, his employer, Mórich Sulák, allegedly raped him on a regular basis and even impregnated him, but no supporting evidence for these allegations has been found. Later on, Sulák introduced the then-19-year-old housemaid to 27-year-old wealthy farmer Pál Rieger, to whom Viktória was married in 1902. The couple later moved to the village of Átokháza, residing in a farmhouse owned by Pál. According to some reports, Rieger was an abusive husband who regularly beat Viktória, but others claimed this to be false. What was certain is that in 1910, the couple divorced, and shortly after, Rieger went off to fight in the First World War, Fődi began dressing and identifying as a man, allegedly because he considered it easier to get a job this way.

Despite being considered an oddball by locals, Fődi, or Pipás Pista as he was known to most, was respected for his job as a day laborer and praised for his strong work ethic. However, he was also notorious for his drinking habits and activities in the local Dog Scraper Inn, where he frequently engaged in fights and cutting the hands of his opponents.

== Confirmed murders ==
Pipás' first known victim was István Börcsök, a soldier and drinking buddy he had known since 1916. In 1919, Börcsök offered to hire Pipás as a farmhand to look after the animals, a job he gladly accepted. While he resided on the farm, Pipás noticed that Börcsök frequently threatened his wife with a gun when drunk, and so, one night, he had a talk with Mrs. Börcsök about getting rid of István. The woman agreed to the proposal, and with the help of his son Imre and another laborer, János Vecsernyes, the trio scared the horses in the barn one night to wake him up. When Börcsök woke up, his wife escorted him to the barn, and while he was distracted, Pipás attacked him from behind and strangled him with a rope. After killing Börcsök, they hanged his corpse from the rafters, then moved it to the pantry at his wife's request, before placing a chair nearby, staging the crime scene to look like a suicide. When they finished, all four went back to the house to celebrate and drink wine.

In 1922, Pipás was commissioned for another "hit" by the wife of Antal Dobák, who was spending the family money on throwing lavish parties to celebrate his return from the frontline. After accepting the offer of wheat, ham, 28 litres of wine, and 150,000 korona, Pipás and two accomplices hid in the man's house and waited for him to arrive back home. When Dobák returned, he was jumped, and a rope was placed around his neck. He was then dragged to the barn, where Pipás hanged him until the man suffocated. After confirming his death, the criminals successfully arranged the crime scene to make it look like a suicide.

== Arrest and revelations ==
In the years that followed, there were reports about upwards of 30 suspicious suicides occurring in the area, but since authorities were incapable of proving beyond a shadow of a doubt that a homicide had been committed, most of these reports were largely ignored. On June 7, 1932, the police were called to resolve a domestic dispute between József Vér and his wife. Oddly, while escorting the woman back home, she made an off-hand remark that József had told her that he believed Antal Dobák hadn't hanged himself back in 1922, but was actually killed by his employee, Pipás Pista.

Deciding to inquire further about these claims, authorities interrogated all family members and possible witnesses, and in the end, they received confirmation from Ver's former wife, Piros, who was the daughter of Dobák, that Pipás had indeed killed him. The authorities immediately ordered that Pipás be arrested, but were only able to capture him and his accomplices months later during a raid on a farmhouse. Initially, Pipás denied the charges, but the accomplices admitted to the murders. The bodies of Börcsök and Dobák were exhumed, but authorities were only able to prove that the latter had been strangled prior to being placed on the noose, as the former's cause of death hadn't been properly recorded at the time.

While awaiting trial for the murders, Pipás proved to be an irritant to the prison guards due to his refusal to bathe. He claimed that he suffered from a medical condition that caused him to moan when he was bathing, and that's why he refused to do so. In order to prove these claims, Pipás was ordered to undergo a psychiatric evaluation, but to the shock of the investigators, it was then revealed that he was born a woman by the name of Viktória Fődi.

On January 13, 1933, Fődi and his accomplices were brought to trial for the murders of Börcsök and Dobák, and subsequently convicted for each: Fődi received the death penalty, while the others were given long prison sentences. His sentence was never carried out, however, as it was commuted to life imprisonment only months later by the Regent of Hungary, Miklós Horthy. This was done after Fődi, who trained as a nurse in prison, became a Catholic and repented for his crimes. Seven years after his conviction, Fődi died in the Csillag Prison on October 10, 1940. The cause of death was determined to be from emphysema.

== Depictions in media and culture ==
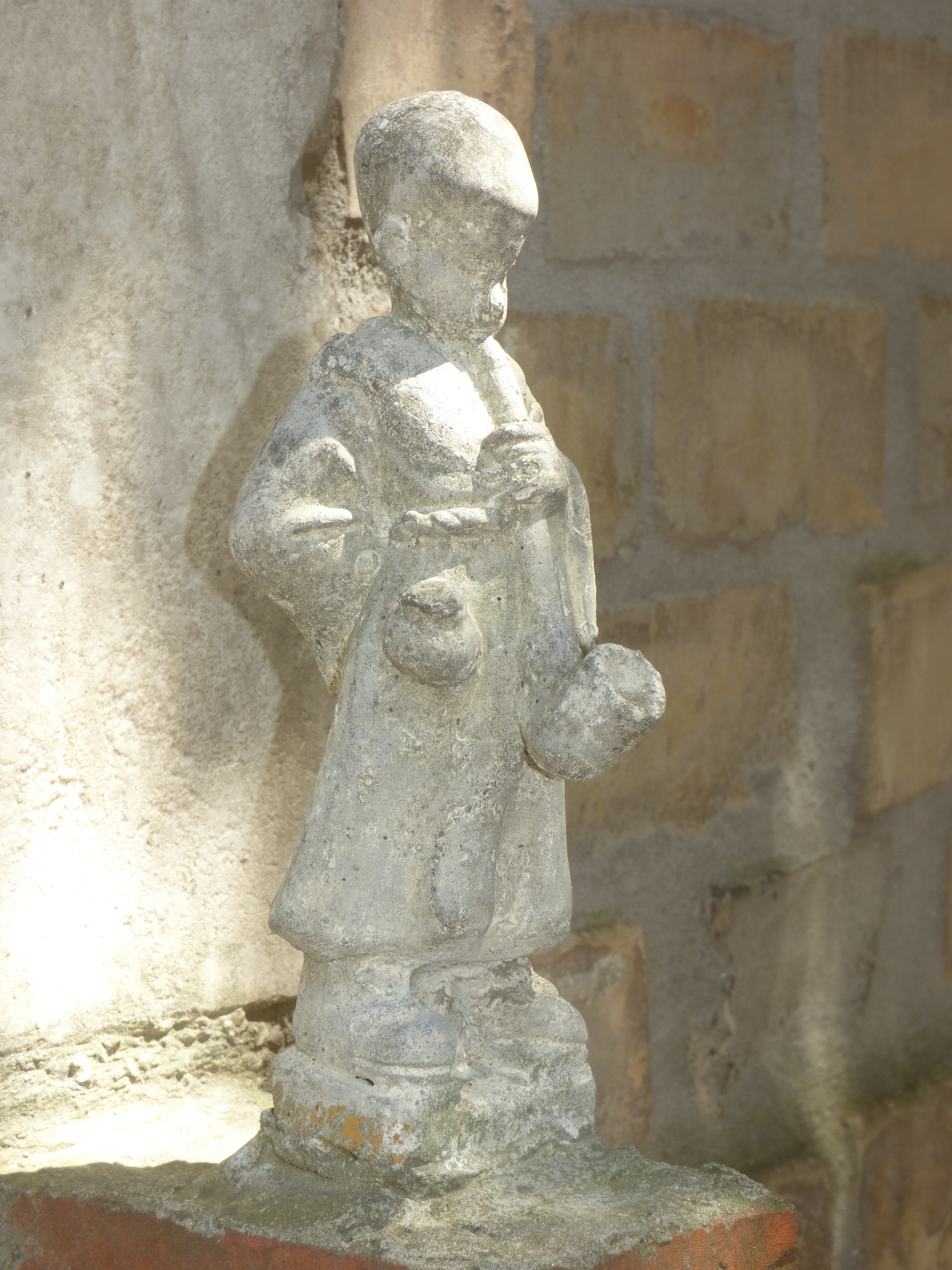
Statue of "Pipás Pista" in Székesfehérvár, by sculptor Jenő Bory

- A statue depicting the caricature of Pipás Pista, made by sculptor Jenő Bory, can be seen at the permanent exhibition of the Bory Castle in Székesfehérvár.
- Fődi was featured in László Szabó's book The Criminal Museum, published in the 1960s; although factually inaccurate and based upon rumors, it further spread the legend of Pipás Pista.
- Fődi was also the subject of a documentary made by director Judit Ember in 1983, as well as another book by István Bubryák published in 2013.
- Hungarian playwright Zsolt Pozsgai wrote a play about the case, entitled Pipás Pista, which was presented at the National Theatre of Szeged on January 25, 2013. It was directed by Frigyes Kovács and actress Gabi Szabó played the role of Fődi.
- The psychedelic folk metal band Virrasztók featured a song dedicated to Pipás Pista in their 2011 album Memento Mori!. In addition, the band All Inclusive Delicates made a ballad about the case.
- The 2025 Hungarian film Mayflies (Pipás in Hungary), directed by Emília Goldberg, depicts Pipás Pista's time in prison and a fictionalized story of love and companionship with Irma, the daughter of the prison pastor, who teaches him to read and write.

== See also ==
- List of serial killers by country

== Bibliography ==
- Nari Shelekpayev, François-Olivier Dorais and Daria Dyakonova (February 22, 2016). Empires, Nations and Private Lives: Essays on the Social and Cultural History of the Great War. Cambridge Scholars Publishing. ISBN 978-1443889285.
- Nermin Ahmed Haikal and Morag Kennedy (July 22, 2019). The Spectacle of Murder: Fact, Fiction and Folk Tales. BRILL. ISBN 978-1848884144.
