= Mathias Sandorf (TV series) =

- Genre: Adventure
- Based on: Mathias Sandorf by Jules Verne
- Written by: Claude Desailly
- Directed by: Jean-Pierre Decourt
- Starring: István Bujtor; Amadeus August
- Composer: Bert Grund
- Countries of origin: France; Hungary; Italy; West Germany
- Original languages: French; German
- No. of series: 1
- No. of episodes: 6

Production
- Cinematography: János Kende
- Running time: 360 minutes (complete)
- Production companies: I.T.F. Magyar Televízió Müvelödési Föszerkesztöség (MTV); Technisonor; Tele München Fernseh Produktionsgesellschaft

Original release
- Network: ZDF
- Release: 2 December – 11 December 1979

Mathias Sandorf is a 1979 historical adventure television series based on the Jules Verne novel of the same title. A co-production between France, Hungary, Italy and West Germany, it debuted on West Germany's ZDF in December 1979 before receiving a French broadcast the following year.

== Partial cast ==
- István Bujtor as Mathias Sandorf
- Amadeus August as Étienne Bathory
- Ivan Desny as Ladislaus Zathmary
- Jutta Speidel as Rena Sandorf
- Monika Peitsch as Gertrud Toronthal
- Jacques Breuer as Pierre Bathory
- Sissy Höfferer as Sava Toronthal
- Marie-Christine Demarest as Clara Bathory
- Claude Giraud as Silas Toronthal

== Bibliography ==
- Bock, Hans-Michael & Bergfelder, Tim. The Concise CineGraph. Encyclopedia of German Cinema. Berghahn Books, 2009. ISBN 978-0-85745-565-9.
