= Jacques Breuer =

Austrian actor (1956–2024)

- Born: Jacques Breuer; 20 October 1956; Munich, Bavaria, West Germany
- Died: 5 September 2024 (aged 67)
- Education: Otto Falckenberg School of the Performing Arts, Camerloher-Gymnasium in Freising
- Occupations: Actor, film director
- Years active: 1975–2024
- Spouse: Viola Wedekind
- Parent: Siegfried Breuer jr. (father)
- Relatives: Siegfried Breuer (grandfather), Pascal Breuer (brother)

Jacques Breuer (20 October 1956 – 5 September 2024) was an Austrian screen and voice actor and film director who lived in Germany. His grandfather was the popular Austrian actor Siegfried Breuer and both his father, Siegfried Breuer Jr., and his younger brother, Pascal Breuer, are actors.

Born in Munich, Germany, Breuer graduated from the musical Camerloher-Gymnasium in Freising. His acting debut was in 1975 when he was still attending the Otto Falckenberg School of the Performing Arts when he played in Brecht's Señora Carrar's Rifles at Munich Kammerspiele. Between 1977 and 1979 he was a cast member of the Bayerischen Staatsschauspiels. He then worked as a freelancer until his death from a stroke on 5 September 2024, at the age of 67.

== Filmography ==
- 1975: Derrick - Season 2, Episode 9: "Ein Koffer aus Salzburg"
- 1976: Everyone Dies Alone
- 1978: Good-for-Nothing
- 1978: Derrick - Season 5, Episode 8: "Solo für Margarete"
- 1979: Mathias Sandorf, TV miniseries
- 1980: Derrick - Season 7, Episode 7: "Der Tod sucht Abonnenten"
- 1981: Derrick - Season 8, Episode 7: "Das sechste Streichholz"
- 1981: Berlin Tunnel 21
- 1983: Derrick - Season 10, Episode 4: "Der Täter schickte Blumen"
- 1984: Egmont, TV film
- 1984: Don Carlos, TV film
- 1985: Derrick - Season 12, Episode 6: "Das tödliche Schweigen"
- 1985: Morenga
- 1986: The Second Victory
- 1987: Wallenstein, TV miniseries
- 1987: The Cry of the Owl, TV film
- 1988: A Case for Two - "Kurz hinter Ankara"
- 1988: Finsternis bedeckt die Erde, TV miniseries
- 1988: Stahlkammer Zürich, TV series
- 1990: Café Meineid, TV series
- 1990: Café Europa
- 1991: Derrick - Season 18, Episode 7: "Der Tote spielt fast keine Rolle"
- 1993: Derrick - Season 20, Episode 8: "Zwei Tage, zwei Nächte"
- 1994: Derrick - Season 21, Episode 8: "Gesicht hinter der Scheibe"
- 1995: Liebe, Leben Tod
- 1997: Derrick - Season 24, Episode 4: "Gesang der Nachtvögel"
- 1998: Zum Sterben schön
- 1998: Singles, TV series
- 1998: Ärzte - Season 6, Episode 4: "Dr. Vogt - Freundschaften"
- 2000: Der Zauber des Rosengartens, TV film
- 2000: Midsummer Stories
- 2001: Death Train to the Pacific, TV film
- 2002: Schlosshotel Orth, TV series
- 2002: Polizeiruf 110, TV series
- 2003: Mama und der Millionär, TV film
- 2003: Das Toscanakarussel, TV film
- 2003: SOKO Kitzbühel, TV series
- 2003: The Uncrowned Heart, TV film
- 2004: Tramitz & Friends, TV series
- 2004: Um Himmels Willen, TV series
- 2005: The Old Fox: Der Filmriss, TV
- 2005: Siska, TV series
- 2005: Cash...und ewig rauschen die Gelder, TV film
- 2006: The Old Fox: Tag der Rache, TV
- 2006: SOKO 5113: Ein Leben für die Kunst, TV
- 2006: Vergiss, wenn du lieben willst, TV film
- 2006: Im Tal der wilden Rosen - Vermächtnis der Liebe, TV film
- 1978–2001: guest appearances in: Tatort, Siska, The Old Fox, Wolffs Revier, Medicopter 117, Inspector Rex
