= Zalaegerszeg =

- City with county rights
- Zalaegerszeg Megyei Jogú Város
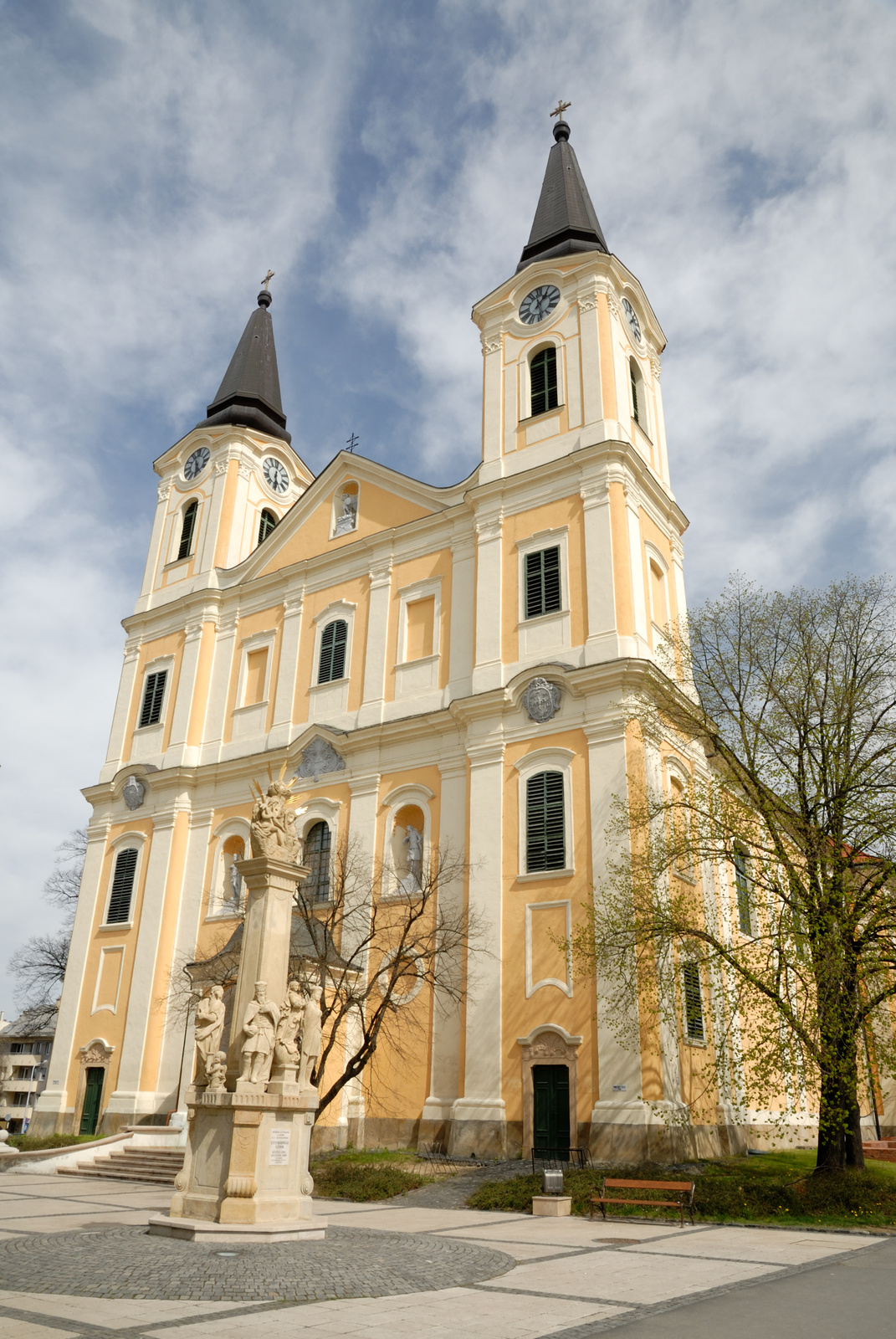
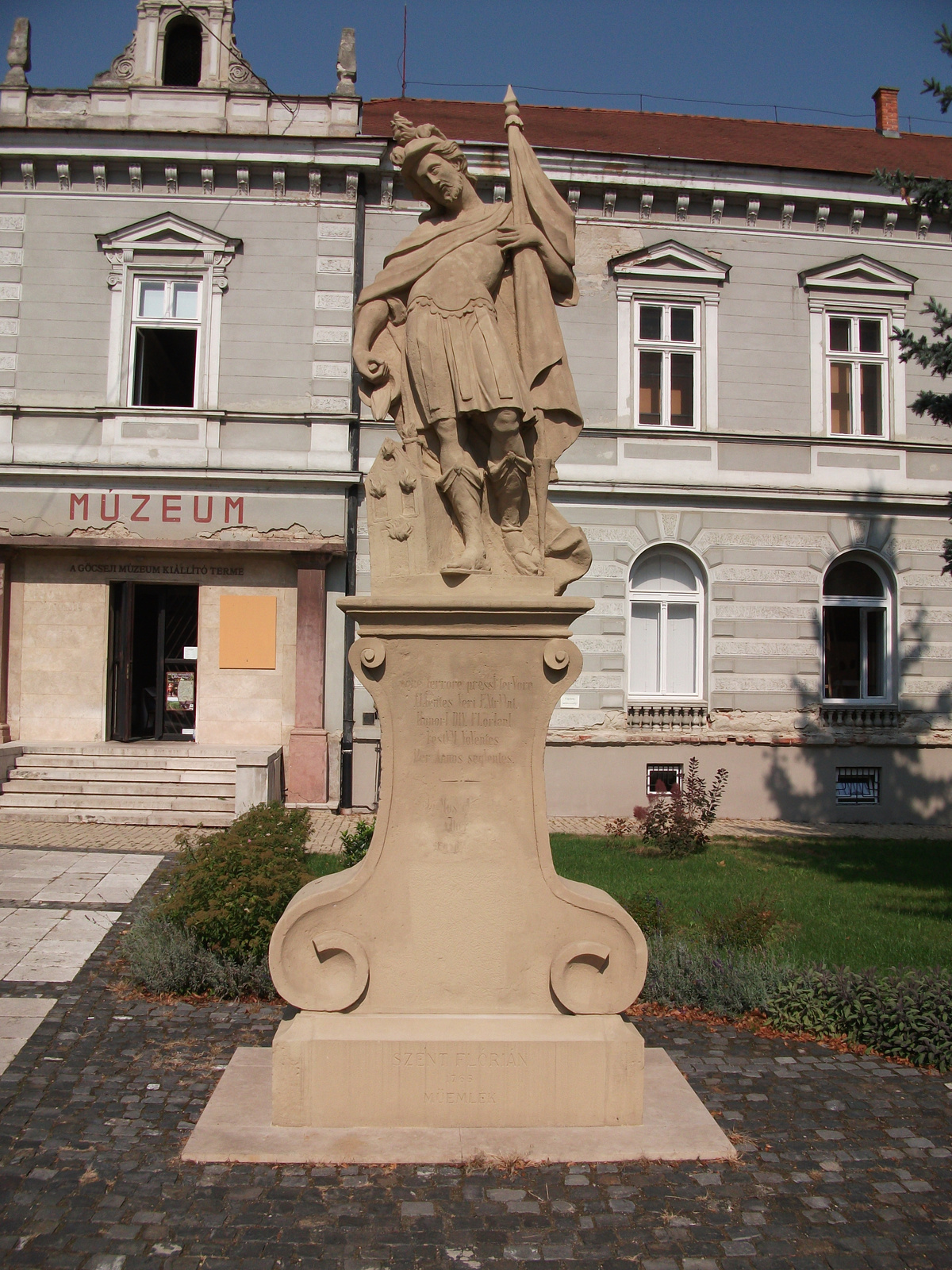
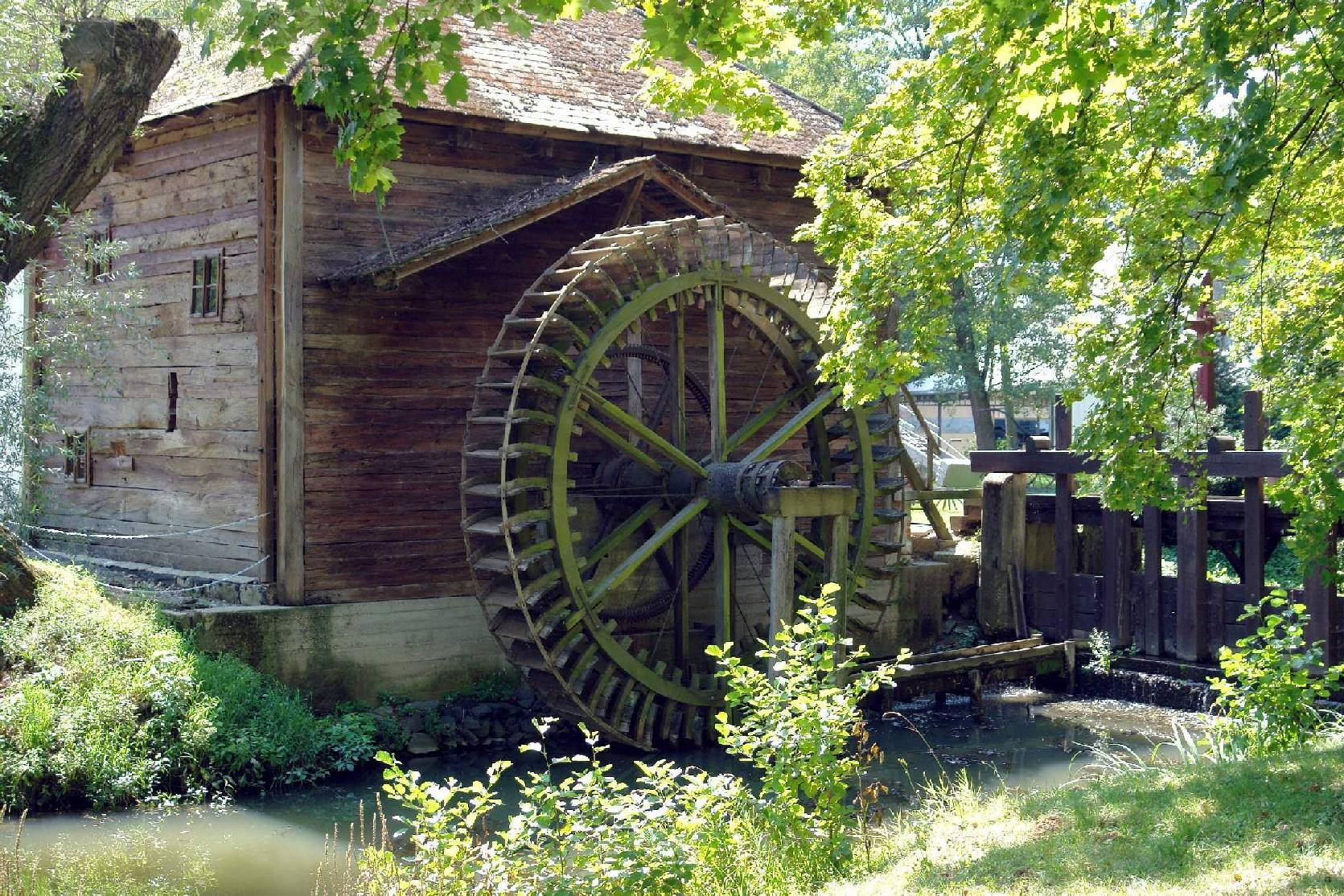
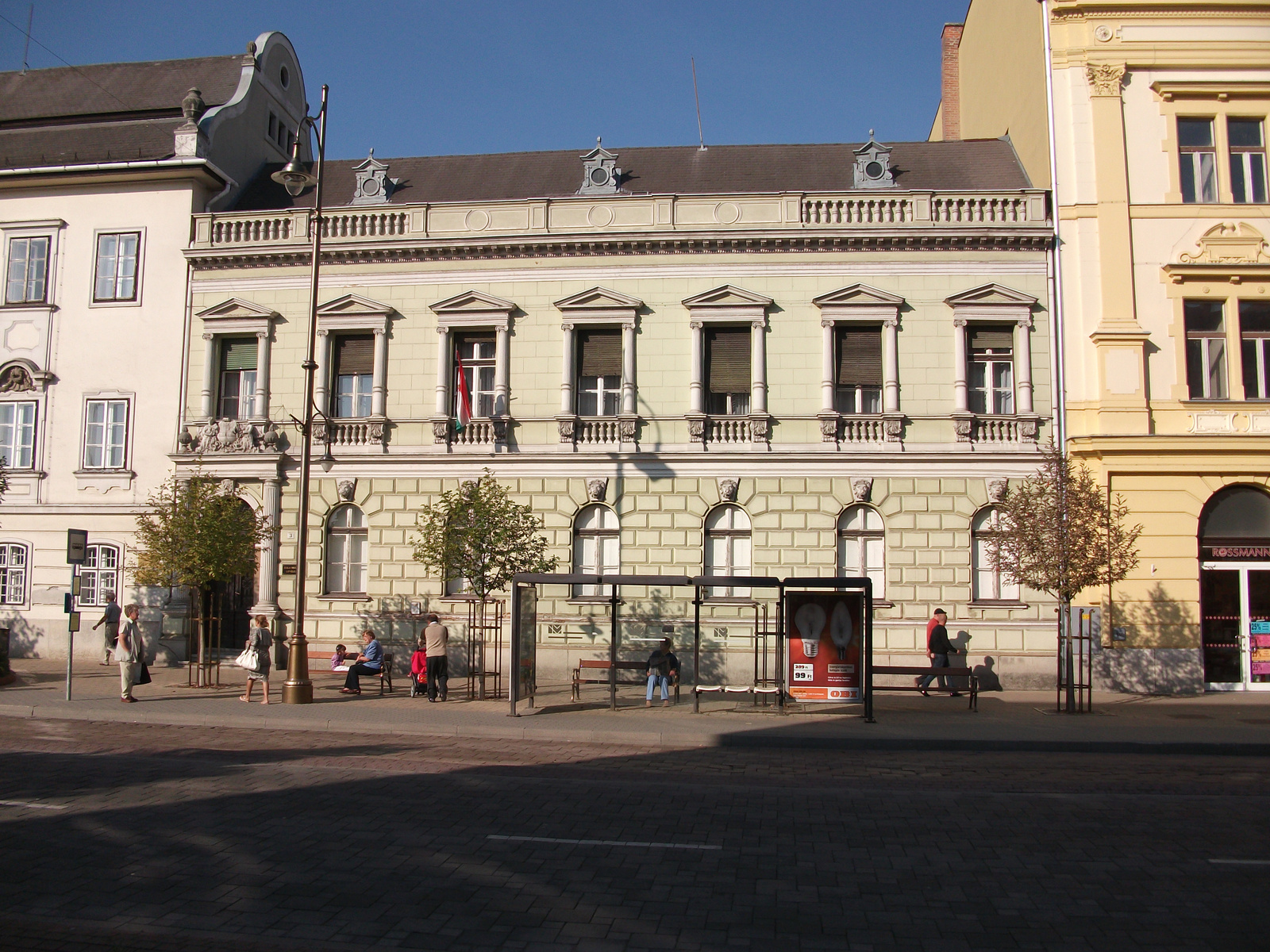
- Left: Mary Magdalene Church, A water wheel in Village Museum of Göcsej, Right: Statue of Szent Florián, Zala Megyei Leveltár Reference Office (all items from above to bottom)

- Flag Coat of arms
- Nicknames: Egerszeg, Zeg
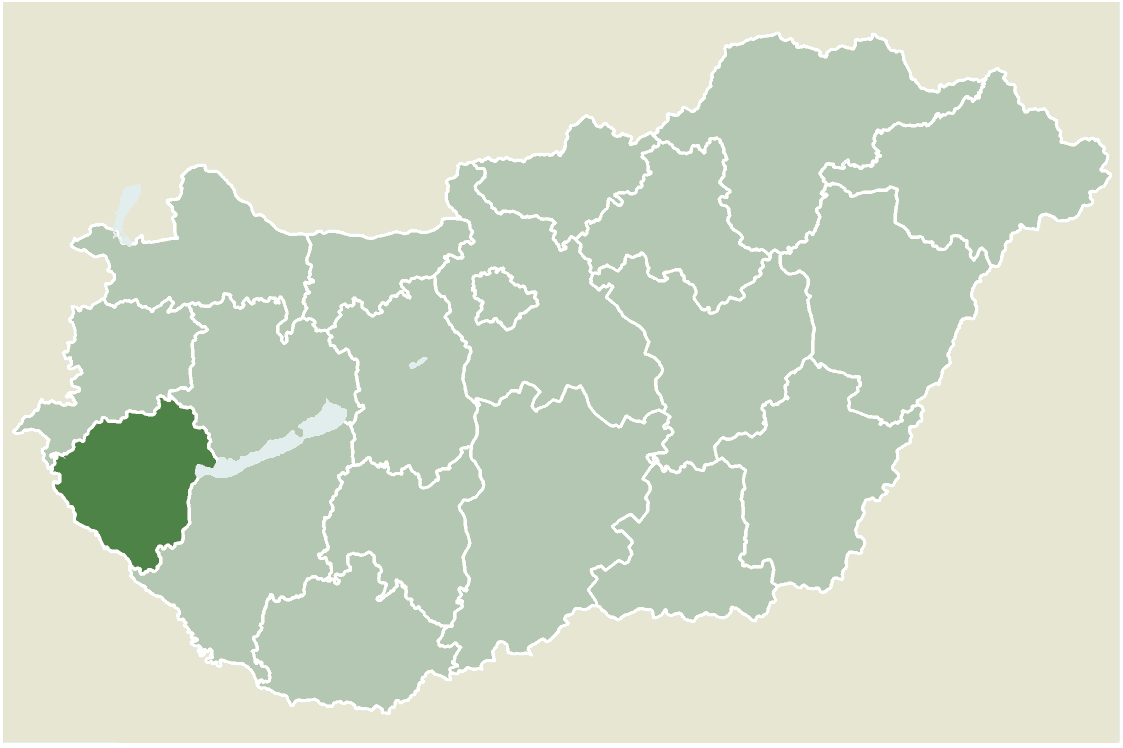
- -->

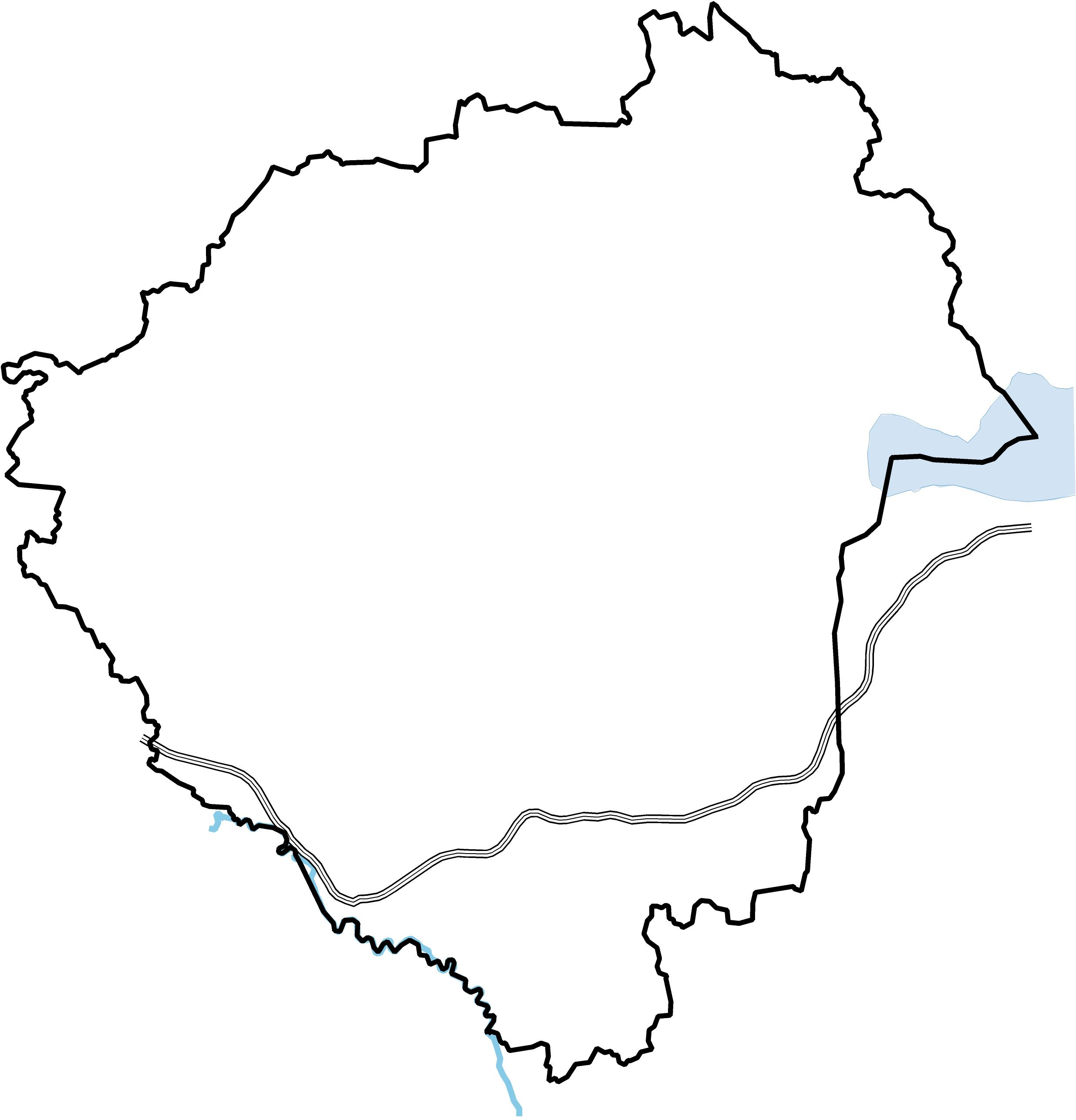
- Location within Zala County Location within Hungary
- Coordinates: 46.84538°N 16.84721°E
- Country: Hungary
- County: Zala
- District: Zalaegerszeg

Government
  - Mayor: Zoltán Balaicz (Fidesz)

Area
  - Total: 99.98 km^{2} (38.60 sq mi)
- Elevation: 166 m (545 ft)

Population (2011)
  - Total: 61,970
  - Rank: 17th
  - Density: 621.7/km^{2} (1,610/sq mi)
  - Demonym: egerszegi zalaegerszegi

Population by ethnicity
  - Hungarians: 86.2%
  - Gypsies: 1.4%
  - Germans: 0.9%
  - Romanians: 0.2%
  - Poles: 0.1%
  - Croats: 0.1%
  - Others: 0.8%

Population by religion
  - Roman Catholic: 52.5%
  - Greek Catholic: 0.1%
  - Calvinists: 2.9%
  - Lutherans: 1.1%
  - Jews: 0.1%
  - Other: 1.1%
  - Non-religious: 14.3%
  - Unknown: 27.9%
- Time zone: UTC+1 (CET)
  - Summer (DST): UTC+2 (CEST)
- Postal code: 8900
- Area code: (+36) 92
- Website: zalaegerszeg.hu

Zalaegerszeg (Hungarian pronunciation: [ˈzɒlɒɛɡɛrsɛɡ]; Croatian: Jegersek; Slovene: Jageršek; German: Egersee) is the administrative center of Zala county in western Hungary.

== Location ==
Zalaegerszeg lies on the banks of the Zala River, close to the Slovenian and Austrian borders, and 220 kilometres (137 miles) west-southwest of Budapest by road.

== History ==
The area was already inhabited in the Upper Paleolithic, according to archaeological findings (the oldest ones in Zala county). Later, the area was inhabited by Celts.

The first written mentions of the town are as Egerscug (1247) and Egerszeg (1293); the name means "alder-tree corner" and is probably a reference to the town's situation in the angle where two rivers meet. King Béla IV donated the town to the diocese of Veszprém in 1266, so that it became Church property. As Egerszeg lay somewhat distant from Veszprém, however, the taxes paid by the town often ended up in the pockets of such local oligarchs as the Kőszegi family.

In the 14th century, Egerszeg was the largest town of the area. Between 1368 and 1389, it was a royal town for a short time, then Sigismund I donated it to the Kanizsai family who traded it for another town with the bishop of Veszprém. Zalaegerszeg remained their property until 1848.

In 1381, the town built a stone church. In 1421, Egerszeg was granted oppidum status, which meant they could pay taxes once a year and the citizens could elect their own judge. The population grew quickly, and by the 16th century, Egerszeg became the de facto centre of Zala comitatus.

In the 1530s, development was brought to a halt. Taking advantage of the power of the king being weakened, the owners of the surrounding lands attacked the town often, and the Ottomans already began to occupy Hungary after the Battle of Mohács in 1526. From 1568, the town was fortified, a castle was built. The Ottomans attacked the town for the first time in the late 1570s, but they failed to capture it.

After Kanizsa fell to the Ottomans, the strategic importance of Egerszeg grew, but the castle was severely damaged in 1616 and captured by the Ottomans for a short time in 1664. The citizens suffered not only from the war, but from plagues and heavy taxes as well.

Egerszeg, even though it was on the periphery of the comitatus, became its capital in the 18th century, mostly because the councils were always held there, because of its importance in the Ottoman times and because it wasn't the estate of a local lord, unlike the other towns in Zala. The county hall was built between 1730 and 1732 in Baroque style, and for a long time it was the only significant building of the town. In the 1760s a large church and a barracks was built. Most of the citizens still did not own stone-built houses, and fires often destroyed the town, until 1826, when stone buildings were built.

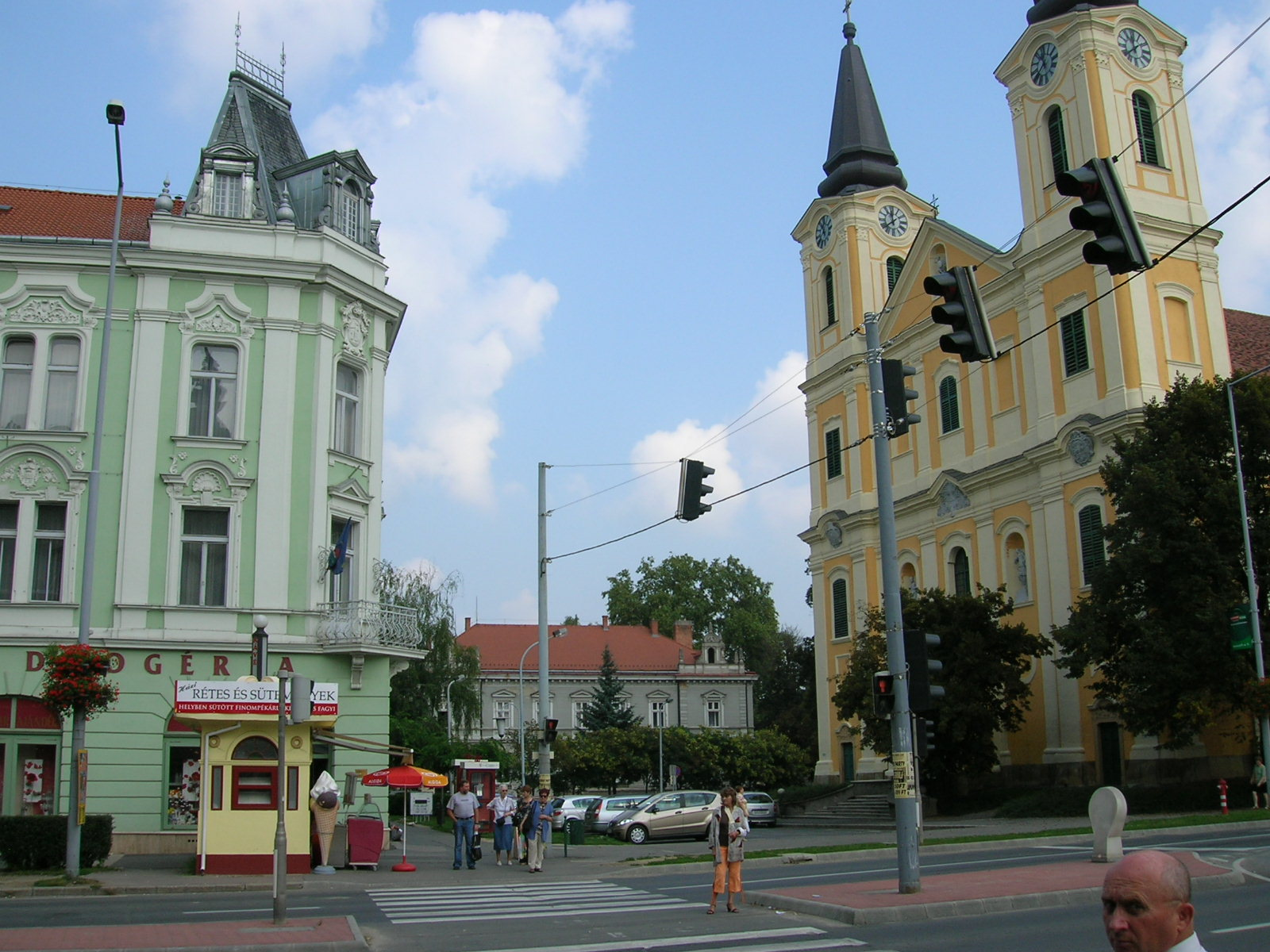
Church of Mary Magdalene, patron saint of Zalaegerszeg

Until the early 19th century, there were only a few craftsmen and merchants in the town, because they had to pay taxes to the bishop who owned the city. By the 1830s 10% of the residents of the mostly Catholic town were Jewish, but even they did not give a boost to trade. Because of this, even though the town was the centre of administration, economically and culturally it was not really important. Even though it had about 3,500 residents, it had only two primary schools. The cultural centres of the comitatus were Kanizsa and Keszthely.

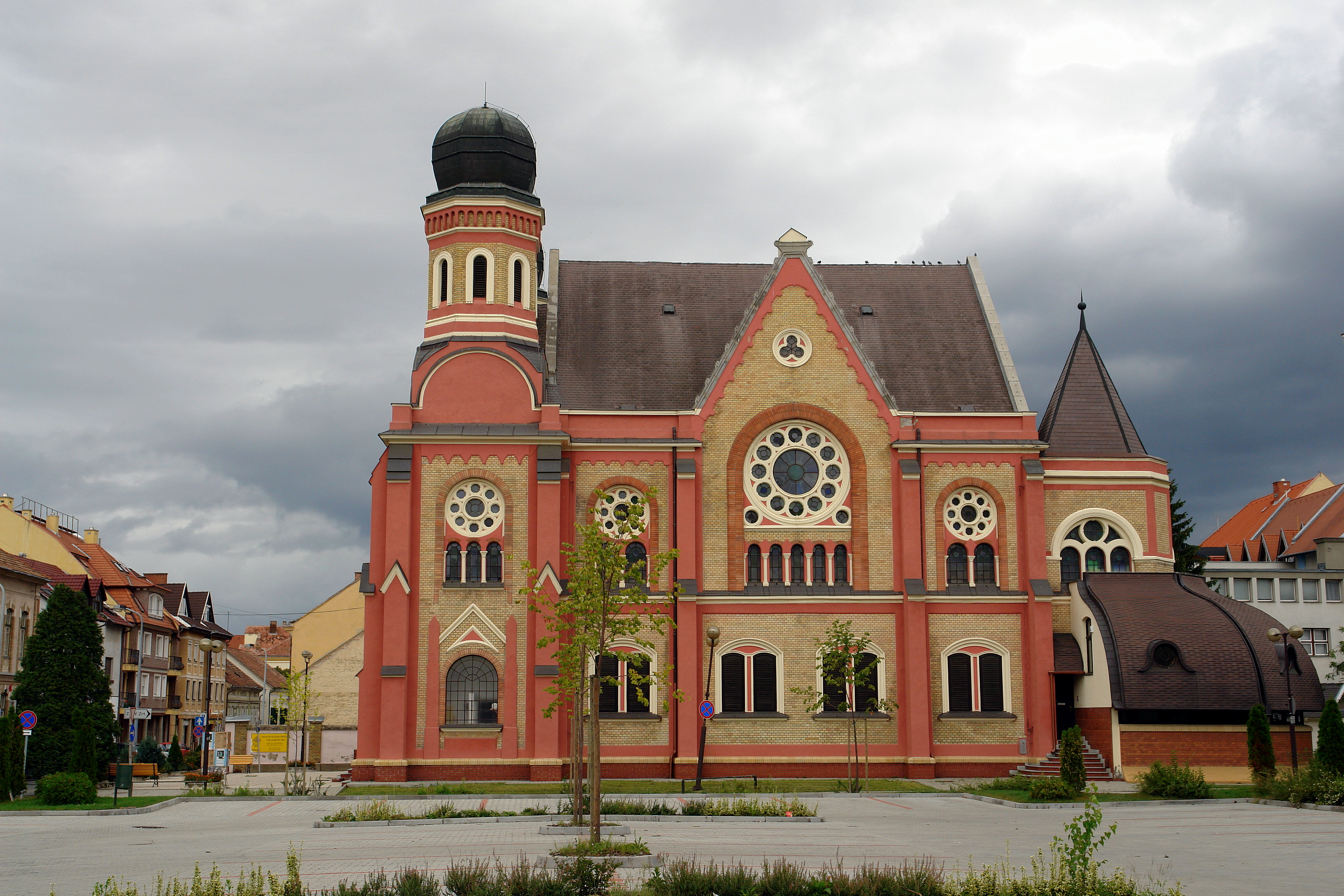
Zalaegerszeg Synagogue

Zalaegerszeg played only a minor role in the revolution and freedom fight in 1848–49. In 1870, it lost its town status and became a village, which meant a decrease in prestige, even more so since Nagykanizsa kept its town status. On 31 May 1885 Zalaegerszeg became a town again. In 1887, the village of Ola was annexed to the town. In 1890, the railway line between Ukk and Csáktornya (now Čakovec) connected Zalaegerszeg to the railway system of the country. In 1895, several new buildings were built, including a new secondary school, a town hall, a hotel, a nursery school and a brick factory, but the town ran into debt and the mayor, Károly Kovács, had to resign. His successor, Lajos Botfy, decreased the debt and could continue the development of the town, but in the early 20th century Zalaegerszeg was still behind the other county seats in many ways.

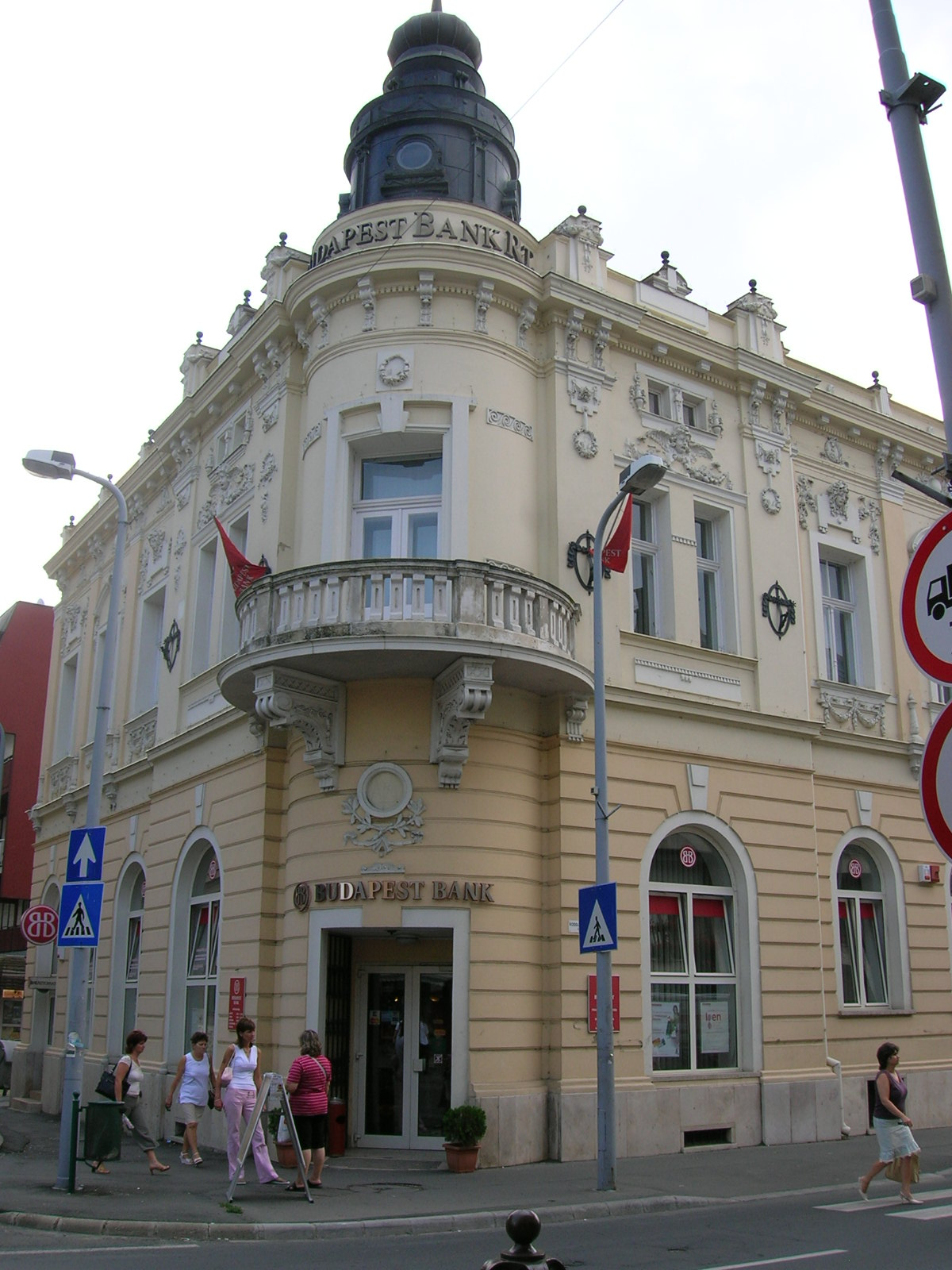
Downtown

The representative at the Hungarian Parliament József Farkas de Boldogfa was a person of deep catholic and monarchist convictions, although he was a very tolerant and also responsible Parliament Representative: On 12 December 1901 József Farkas de Boldogfa led a delegation to Budapest to meet Baron Gyula Wlassics de Zalánkemén (1852–1937) Minister of Religion and Education to seek his support for building a Synagogue on Zalaegerszeg, relying on the fact that the minister, as a Zalaegerszeg native, is well aware of the situation of the local Jews' community. A couple of years after these negotiations the Synagogue of Zalaegerszeg was finished in 1904.

The 1920s brought prosperity again; new buildings included the new post office, the railway station, the office of the fire department, the police headquarters, the monastery of the Notre Dame Order and a synagogue in Baroque style.

The most significant loss in World War II was the deportation of the 1221 Jewish citizens to Auschwitz. The city was freed from the Nazis by the Red Army on 28 March 1945. In the next local elections in 1949, the local branch of the Communist party got only about 10% of the vote, but they still became the leaders of the city.

The 1950s brought important changes. Zalaegerszeg got a more industrial profile with the construction of the textile factory and the discovery of oil resources in 1952. The railway line was expanded, too. Many workers were commuting from the nearby villages, because it was almost impossible to find a flat in the city, so several residents of Zalaegerszeg (mostly those who were considered to be opposed to the Socialist system) were forced to relocate.

The citizens took part in the revolution in 1956. The revolution in the city began on 26 October. The communist local government fled to Körmend, and until the arrival of the Soviet troops (November 4) the city was governed by the Revolutionary Council.

In the 1960s and 1970s, the city experienced a demographic explosion. Several new flats were built, new residents moved into them, and the growing city absorbed many surrounding villages (Csácsbozsok, Botfa, Zalabesenyő, Bazita, Andráshida, and Pózva). Albeit at a slower pace, it continues to expand toward the settlements of Bocfölde and Bagod.

After the end of Socialism, Zalaegerszeg wasn't affected by economic recession as much as other cities were. The 1990s brought dynamic development to the city.

Zalaegerszeg hosted the 1983 World Orienteering Championships. In 2001, Zalaegerszeg hosted the Central European Olympiad in Informatics (CEOI). Zalaegerszeg also hosted the 2004 European Women's Handball Championship preliminary round, the 2005 UEFA Women's Under-19 Championship and the 2005 European Fencing Championships.

== Climate ==
Zalaegerszeg's climate is classified as oceanic climate (Köppen Cfb). The annual average temperature is 10.6 °C (51.1 °F), the hottest month in July is 20.9 °C (69.6 °F), and the coldest month is 0.0 °C (32.0 °F) in January. The annual precipitation is 633.9 millimetres (24.96 in), of which June is the wettest with 80.0 millimetres (3.15 in), while January is the driest with only 21.0 millimetres (0.83 in). The extreme temperature throughout the year ranged from −20.4 °C (−4.7 °F) on 10 February 1996, to 38.1 °C (100.6 °F) on 8 August 2013.

Climate data for Zalaegerszeg, 1991−2020 normals
Month	Jan	Feb	Mar	Apr	May	Jun	Jul	Aug	Sep	Oct	Nov	Dec	Year
Record high °C (°F)	17.4 (63.3)	21.2 (70.2)	22.4 (72.3)	28.2 (82.8)	32.3 (90.1)	34.8 (94.6)	37.9 (100.2)	38.1 (100.6)	32.8 (91.0)	26.1 (79.0)	21.5 (70.7)	17.0 (62.6)	38.1 (100.6)
Mean daily maximum °C (°F)	3.1 (37.6)	5.9 (42.6)	10.8 (51.4)	16.6 (61.9)	20.9 (69.6)	24.7 (76.5)	26.8 (80.2)	26.6 (79.9)	20.8 (69.4)	15.3 (59.5)	8.7 (47.7)	3.6 (38.5)	15.3 (59.5)
Daily mean °C (°F)	0.0 (32.0)	1.8 (35.2)	6.1 (43.0)	11.3 (52.3)	15.4 (59.7)	19.1 (66.4)	20.9 (69.6)	20.6 (69.1)	15.6 (60.1)	10.7 (51.3)	5.5 (41.9)	0.7 (33.3)	10.6 (51.1)
Mean daily minimum °C (°F)	−2.6 (27.3)	−1.7 (28.9)	2.3 (36.1)	6.5 (43.7)	10.1 (50.2)	13.8 (56.8)	15.3 (59.5)	15.3 (59.5)	11.2 (52.2)	6.8 (44.2)	2.8 (37.0)	−1.5 (29.3)	6.5 (43.7)
Record low °C (°F)	−17.3 (0.9)	−20.4 (−4.7)	−15.0 (5.0)	−4.5 (23.9)	0.8 (33.4)	3.0 (37.4)	6.0 (42.8)	5.3 (41.5)	0.7 (33.3)	−9.4 (15.1)	−10.2 (13.6)	−19.3 (−2.7)	−20.4 (−4.7)
Average precipitation mm (inches)	21.0 (0.83)	31.8 (1.25)	32.8 (1.29)	41.0 (1.61)	65.8 (2.59)	80.0 (3.15)	71.7 (2.82)	69.4 (2.73)	76.4 (3.01)	55.7 (2.19)	51.3 (2.02)	37.0 (1.46)	633.9 (24.96)
Average precipitation days (≥ 1.0 mm)	4.1	5.2	5.5	6.4	8.7	8.8	8.3	7.2	7.0	6.8	7.4	6.0	81.4
Average relative humidity (%)	82.1	73.8	67.3	62.9	68.1	69.6	68.6	69.8	76.0	81.4	84.3	83.9	74.0
Source: NOAA

== Main sights ==
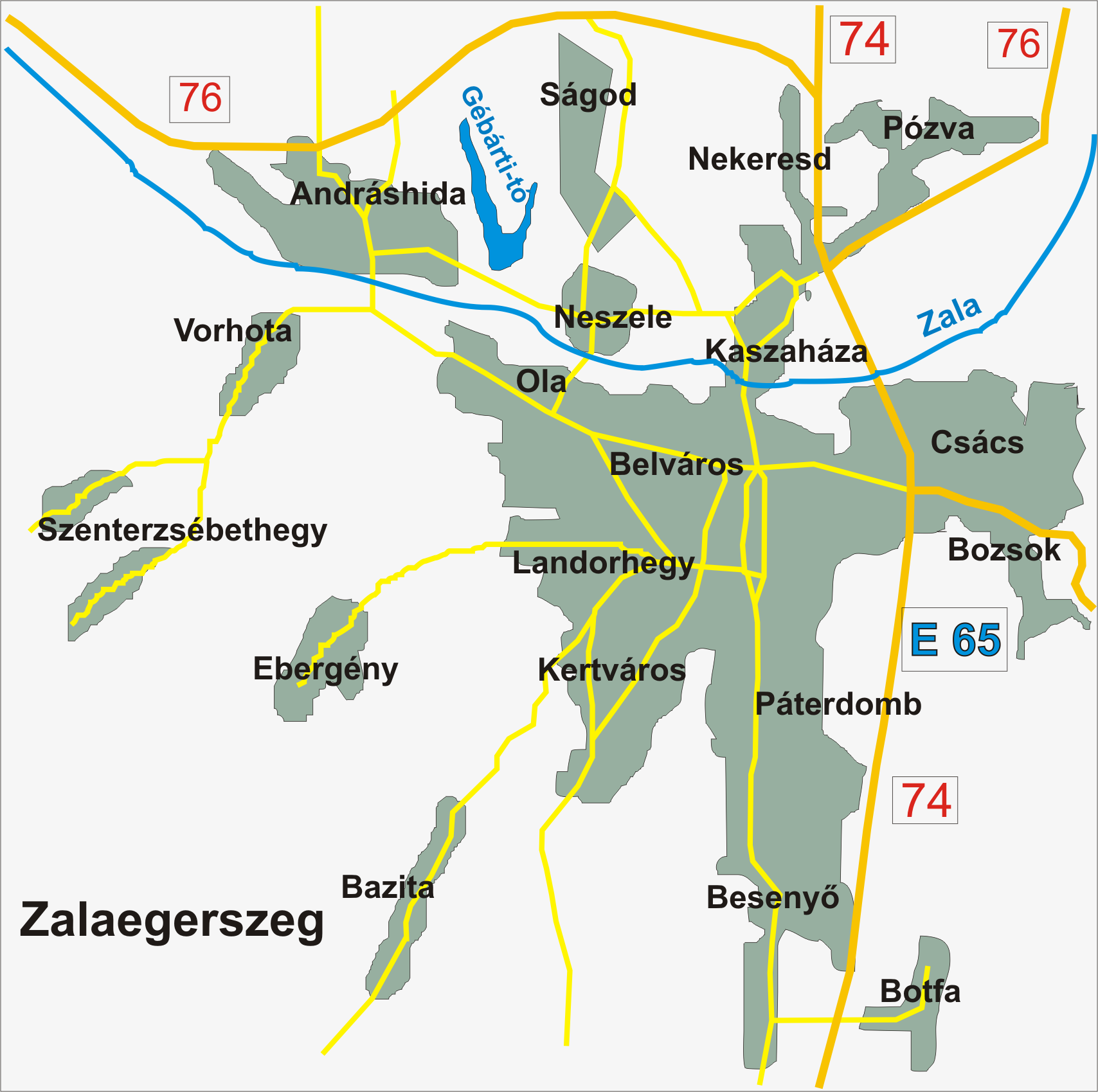
Schematic map of Zalaegerszeg

- Roman Catholic church (Baroque)
- Old county hall (18th century)
- Hevesi Sándor Theatre
- Göcsej Museum and open-air museum
- Museum of Oil Industry
- Kisfaludi Strobl collection
- Bazita Peak TV Tower

== Sport ==
- Zalaegerszegi TE, local football team
- Zalakeramia-ZTE KK Professional Basketball team

== Demographics ==
Historical population
Year	Pop.	±%
1870	9,784	—
1880	10,736	+9.7%
1890	12,794	+19.2%
1900	15,207	+18.9%
1910	16,727	+10.0%
1920	19,606	+17.2%
1930	19,906	+1.5%
1941	20,472	+2.8%
1949	21,668	+5.8%
1960	30,147	+39.1%
1970	40,541	+34.5%
1980	56,108	+38.4%
1990	62,212	+10.9%
2001	61,654	−0.9%
2011	59,499	−3.5%
2022	54,000	−9.2%

In 2001, Zalaegerszeg had 61,654 inhabitants (95.5% Hungarian, 1% Romani, 0.4% German...). The distribution of religions were, 71.1% Roman Catholic, 3.8% Calvinist, 1.6% Lutheran, 11.6% Atheist (2001 census).

== Politics ==
The current mayor of Zalaegerszeg is Zoltán Balaicz (Fidesz-KDNP).

The local Municipal Assembly, elected at the 2019 local government elections, is made up of 18 members (1 Mayor, 12 Individual constituencies MEPs and 5 Compensation List MEPs) divided into these political parties and alliances:

Party	Seats	Current Municipal Assembly
Candidate for Zoltán Balaicz-Fidesz-KDNP	13	M
Opposition coalition (Note: Coalition of Tiéd a Város-DK-Jobbik-LMP-MSZP-Momentum.)	3	
Our Homeland Movement	1	
EZE	1	

== Notable people ==
- Ferenc Deák (1803–1876), member of parliament, minister of justice
- László Dús (born 1941), artist
- Miklós Gábor (1919–1998), actor
- Dezső Keresztury (1904–1996), critic, literary historian
- Zsigmond Kisfaludi Strobl (1884–1975), sculptor
- Károly Kovács (1839–1904), mayor
- József Mindszenty (1892–1975), cardinal, archbishop of Esztergom
- Lajos Portisch (born 1937), chess player
- Gyula Wlassics (1852–1937), minister of education
- Lajos Vajda (1908–1941), painter
- László Andor (*1966), EU commissioner
- Ádám Kása (*1984), Professional Golfer

== Twin towns – sister cities ==
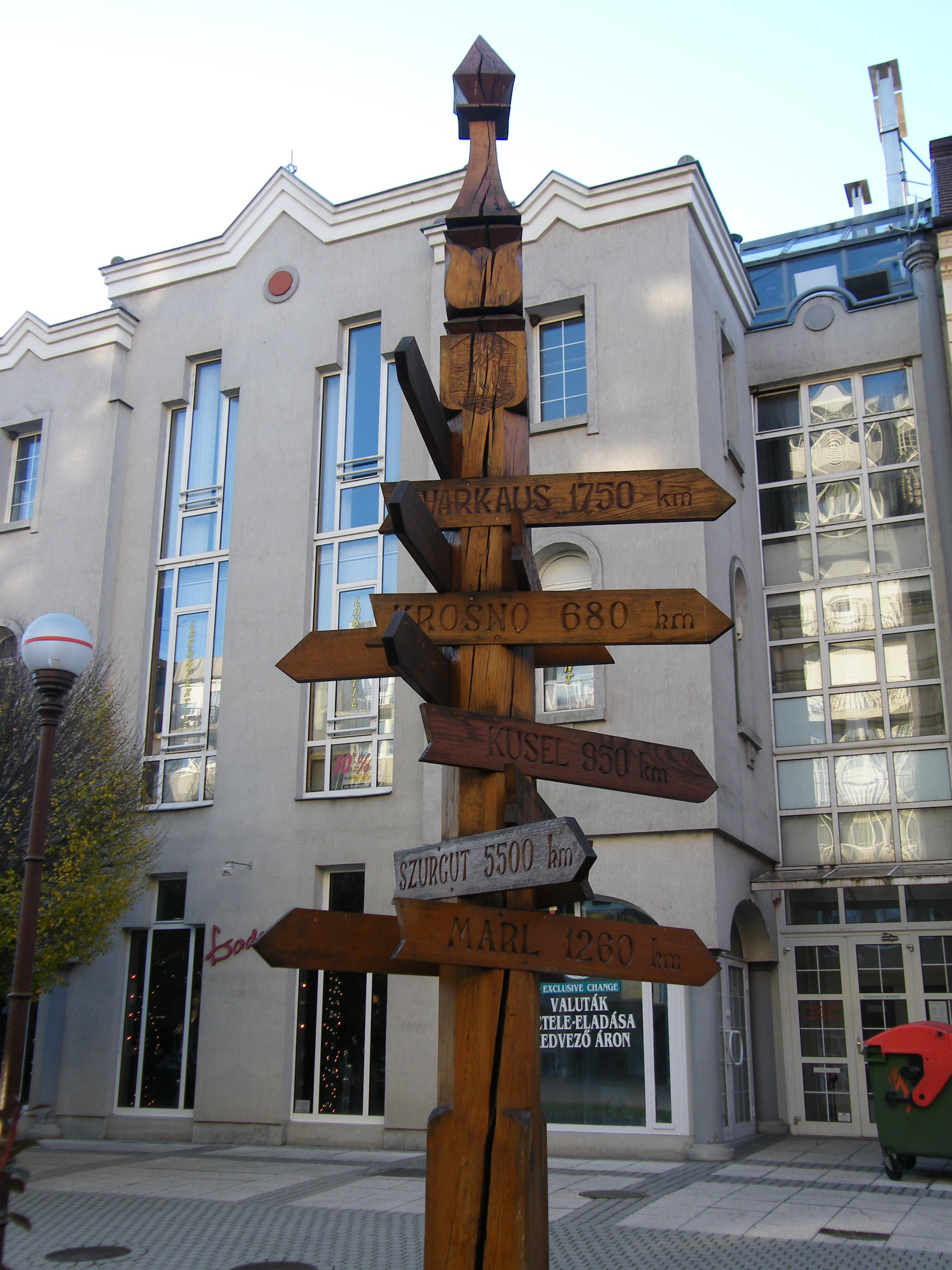
A sign showing Zalaegerszeg's twin towns in the city centre

Zalaegerszeg is twinned with:

- Baraolt, Romania
- Berehove, Ukraine
- Dobrich, Bulgaria
- Gorizia, Italy
- Kherson, Ukraine
- Klagenfurt, Austria
- Krosno, Poland
- Kusel, Germany
- Lendava, Slovenia
- Marl, Germany
- Surgut, Russia
- Târgu Mureş, Romania
- Varaždin, Croatia
- Varkaus, Finland
- Zenica, Bosnia and Herzegovina
