= Ádám Kása =

Hungarian professional golfer (born 1984)

Personal information
- Nickname: Rubix
- Nationality: Hungary
- Born: 25 June 1984 (age 42) Zalaegerszeg, Hungary
- Height: 6 ft 0 in (183 cm)
- Weight: 197 lb (89 kg)

Career
- Sport: Golf
- College: University of Queensland
- Turned professional: 2019
- Current tours: MENA Tour; Clutch Pro Tour
- Former tour: Pro Golf Tour
- Professional wins: 1

Ádám Kása (born 25 June 1984) is a Hungarian professional golfer. He was the highest ranked Hungarian amateur golfer in Hungary over the 2019 season on the European Golf Rankings.

== Early life ==
Kása was born in Zalaegerszeg and was first introduced to golf at the age of 19 by his flatmate after coming across some disused clubs in a storage cellar. Prior to this Kása was a semi-professional Rugby League player in Australia.

== Amateur career ==
Kása had a strong amateur career from 2015 to 2019. He competed in regional, national and international events across the globe. His first amateur win came at the Tamworth Easter Vardon event in 2018.

== Professional career ==
Kása turned professional in October 2019 and currently plays on the various satelitte and mini tours in Europe. He finished the 2021 season at a career high 1682nd place in the Official World Golf Ranking.

With a shortened season in 2020 due to the COVID-19 pandemic, Kása had mixed results with his best result being a tied 25th place at the Portiva Trophy Finalè on the Czech PGA.

2021 and 2022 have seen Kása playing a near full schedule after a disrupted 2020 season. Still without a professional win, 2022 has seen Kása have three Runner-up finishes, twice on the Stella Artois Swiss Pro Series and once on the PGA of Poland. He finished 13th on the Order of Merit for the 2022 season.

After an impressive off-season, the start of the 2022 season delivered Kása's career-low 54 hole score on the Toro Tour in Spain. Kása had scores of 69-69-70 (−5) to finish tied 17th in only his second start of the year.

2024 saw Kása claim his maiden professional win at the 28th Golf in Hessen Championship on the Golf in Hessen Pro Tour in September at Kronberg Golf Club. The victory was not without drama as Kása and South African, Glen Hutcheson, battled it out in a playoff after both shooting rounds of 67 on the tight layout. The first playoff hole saw both players make regulation pars but Kása seized his chance on the 2nd playoff hole after an error from the tee by Hutcheson and was triumphant with another regulation par.
