= Sissy Höfferer =

Austrian television actress (born 1955)

- Born: Sissy Höfferer; April 23, 1955 (age 70); Klagenfurt, Austria

Sissy Höfferer (born April 23, 1955 in Klagenfurt, Austria) is an Austrian television actress.

She had engagements at numerous theater companies such as the Residenztheater Munich, the Deutsches Schauspielhaus Hamburg and the Volkstheater Munich after completing her studies at the Max-Reinhardt-Seminar in Vienna. Concurrently she worked on various feature film and television productions such as The Play with Billions (Dir.: Peter Keglevic), Eine unheimliche Karriere (Dir.: Eberhard Itzenplitz), Regentage (Dir.: Wolfram Paulus), Thema Nr.1 (Dir.: Maria Bachmann), Der Bulle von Tölz (Dir.: Walter Bannert), Tatort (Dir.: Berthold Mittermayer), Polizeiruf 110 (Dir.: Hartmut Griesmayr), Before the Fall (Dir.: Dennis Gansel), Liebe Amelie (Dir.: Maris Pfeiffer), Im Namen des Gesetzes (Dir.: Rolf Wellingerhof), Um Himmels Willen (Dir.: Uli König).

She can also be seen playing detective Carola Geissler, the female lead, on the long running TV series Die Verbrechen des Professor Capellari for the ZDF Television Network.

On the show she has worked with directors such as Thomas Jauch, Dirk Regel, Helmut Metzger, Nikolai Müllerschön, Christian Görlitz and many more.

== Selected filmography ==
- Mathias Sandorf (1979, TV series)
- Derrick - Season 8, Episode 7: "Das sechste Streichholz" (1981)
- Derrick - Season 9, Episode 4: "Die Fahrt nach Lindau" (1982)
- Derrick - Season 11, Episode 11: "Gangster haben andere Spielregeln" (1984)
- Derrick - Season 15, Episode 6: "Da läuft eine Riesensache" (1988)
- Derrick - Season 16, Episode 4: "Blaue Rose" (1989)
- Derrick - Season 18, Episode 4: "Wer bist du, Vater?" (1991)
- Derrick - Season 19, Episode 12: "Kein teurer Toter" (1992)
- Derrick - Season 21, Episode 5: "Eine Endstation" (1994)
- Derrick - Season 21, Episode 11: "Nachtgebete" (1994)

1998-2004 :Les crimes du professeur Capellari, commissaire Carola Gaessler
