= Hevesi Sándor Theatre =

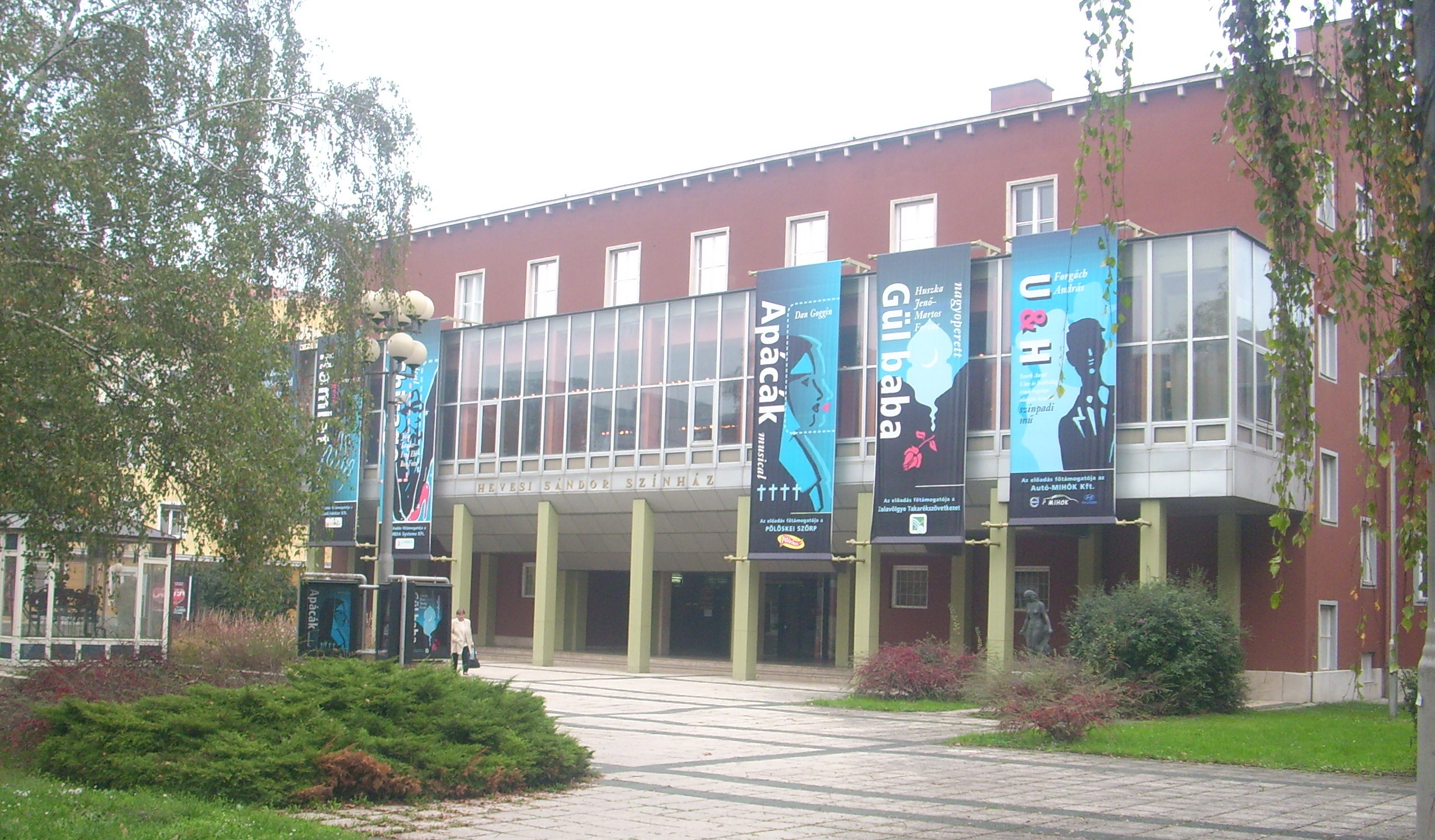
- Interactive map of Hevesi Sándor Theatre
- Address: Kosztolányi Dezső tér 3.
- Location: Zalaegerszeg, Zala county, Hungary
- Coordinates: 46°50′31.28″N 16°50′55.2″E
- Capacity: 618
- Type: Theatre

Construction
- Built: 1962
- Opened: 1983

Website
- Hevesi Sándor Theatre

Hevesi Sándor Theatre (Hevesi Sándor Színház) is a theatre in the city of Zalaegerszeg, Hungary. Its building is situated in the city centre, on Kosztolányi street.

== History ==
Work on the building of the theatre began in the late 1950s, with the original goal to house cultural and artistic events for the working class - it was then known as Worker's Home of Trade Unions of Zalaegerszeg (Szakszervezetek Zalaegerszegi Munkásotthona). It opened with the play Bánk bán by József Katona on 28 January 1968. From 1966 to 1980 it functioned as the cultural center of Zala county (Megyei Művelődési Központ). In 1980 work began to modernise it for proper theatrical use and the Hevesi Sándor Theatre was inaugurated on 11 October 1983 with the play Az ember tragédiája by Imre Madách.

== Directors ==
- József Ruszt (1982–1983)
- Zoltán Varga (1983–1984)
- Ruszt József (1984–1988)
- Imre Halasi (1988–1997)
- Gábor Stefán (1997–2009)
- József Szabó (2009–2010)
- Árpád Besenczi (2010–)
