= Amadeus August =

German actor and singer (1942–1992)

Amadeus August (6 May 1942 in Breslau – 6 July 1992 in Munich) was a German actor and singer.

== Career ==
Amadeus August became famous throughout Europe as protagonist of the successful European TV series Quentin Durward (based on Walter Scott's novel of the same name), broadcast for the first time in 1971. Although it turned out that this role marked the peak of his career, he frequently was a guest star in TV shows, such as Derrick. He also had a supporting role as the Count of Haugwitz-Reventlow in The Barbara Hutton Story in 1987.

He died of AIDS. His sepulchre is in the cemetery of Unterhaching.

== Filmography ==
Year	Title	Role	Notes
1970	Seventeen and Anxious	Robert	
1970	Love, Vampire Style	Peter Busch	a.k.a. The Amorous Adventures of a Young Postman
1971	Quentin Durward	Quentin Durward	13 episodes
1972	Sie liebten sich einen Sommer	Stefan	
1972	Bloody Friday	Christian Hofbauer	
1975	La Course à l'échalote	Gunther	a.k.a. The Wild Goose Chase
1979	Mathias Sandorf	Étienne Bathory	2 episodes
1980	Heiße Kartoffeln	Dr. Johannes Kniefel	
1986	The Assault	Hauptsturmführer	
1987	Poor Little Rich Girl: The Barbara Hutton Story	Count von Haugwitz-Reventlow	TV movie, (parts 2–4)
1988	Lenin...The Train	Colonel Keller	TV movie
1989	Gummibärchen küßt man nicht	Spy Leader	
1989	Dick Francis Mysteries: In The Frame	Hermann Forster	TV movie
1990	Das Erbe der Guldenburgs	Maurice Bernard	5 episodes
1990	Night of the Fox	Muller	TV movie
1991	L'Amour maudit de Leisenbohg	Siegfried	TV movie
1992	Glückliche Reise	Armin Jobst	8 episodes
