= Zsolt Pozsgai =

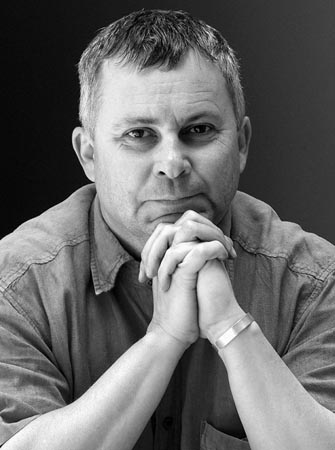
- Born: 20 September 1960 (age 65); Pécs, Hungary
- Occupations: writer, playwright, stage and filmdirector, producer
- Years active: 1987–present

Zsolt Pozsgai (born 20 September 1960 in Pécs) is a Hungarian freelance writer, playwright, stage and film director, and film producer (Horatio Film).

== Career ==
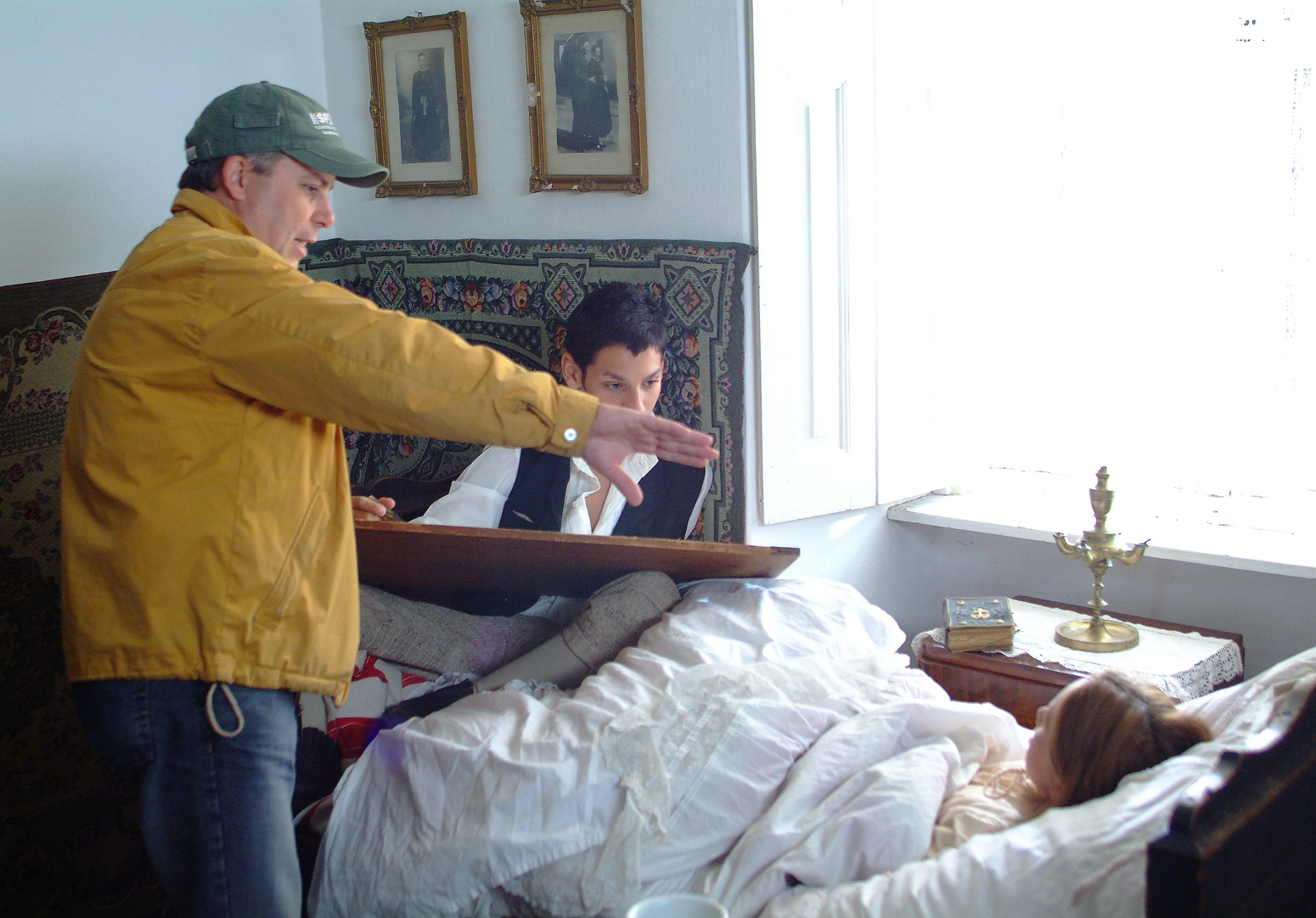
Zsolt Pozsgai on the shooting of the movie Szabadságharc Szebenben

Born in Pécs, in South Hungary, in 1960, Pozsgai become a writer in his early teenage years, and at the age of 14 he was already directing an independent amateur theatre company in Pécs, where he completed his secondary education.

The Hungarian Theatre Archives reported the number of Pozsgai's registered theatre premieres before March 2015:

- as author: 112,
- as a director: 53,
- as a dramaturge: 13,
- as a translator: 5,
- as actor: 2 and
- as a lyricist: 1.

Pozsgai has been the general director of Horatio Film Ltd., Budapest since 2007.

=== Start of career ===
Pozsgai organized and directed an amateur theatre in Pécs from his childhood until 1982, when he, as a dramaturge and assistant of arts, became employed by the National Theatre of Pécs. He explored many jobs between the day of his graduation from high school in 1979 and his employment in the artistic sector of theatres. He frequently published his creations, primarily poems. These years were the period of his conscious preparation for his career as a writer. For many years, he was the assistant to Menyhért Szegvári, chief director at the National Theatre of Pécs, whom he considered to be his master tutor during his ensuing work as a theatre director. After the chief director quit, Pozsgai also left the theatre and was appointed the editor of the press of literary artworks in Pécs in cooperation with Tibor Tüskés, an excellent historian of literature. In those days, he also attended the University of Sciences in Pécs and performed his mandatory military service.

Pozsgai compiled his first featured theatrical play, titled Horatio, during the years of his military service. Horatio was directed by Péter Tömöry and was performed at the Hevesi Sándor Theatre in Zalaegerszeg, Hungary in 1988 with great success.

=== Career at the theatre ===
In that period, Pozsgai lived in Budapest; he was the dramaturge and director of the Kolibri Theatre there in addition to his job at the metropolitan press. This theatre featured his first play directed for children in 1995. After that, the Madách Theatre of Budapest premiered his drama titled Viaszmadár (Vaxbird), which won the ″Best New Hungarian Drama Award of the year″ (Szép Ernő Award category ″for First Drama″).

Pozsgai was invited to join the Hungarian Writers' Union.

In 1992, he was appointed the chief artistic director of the Arizona Theatre where his musical titled "Kölyök" (The Kid), which he compiled in cooperation with conductor Tibor Nagy, debuted with great success. After that, new dramas and new premiers followed one by one at theatres both in Budapest and in the countryside. In 1995, he directed a drama titled "Arthur és Paul" (Arthur and Paul) at the Madách Theatre in Budapest. In 1996, this drama won the Europe Theatre Prize in Berlin that is given to the best new European drama.

The author was the dramaturge and chief director of the Madách Theatre and after that of the Magyar Theatre in Budapest in that period already. Nearly all of the theatres in the countryside played one of his dramas, many of which were also directed by him. In 2004, he founded the Aranytíz Theatre in Budapest. He was appointed the artistic director of the Komédium Theatre in Budapest as well. Although for a short period of time (between 2011 and 2013), he was appointed the chief director and artistic director of the Új Theatre in Budapest.

Since 2013, Pozsgai has been a self-employed writer, director and producer.

By the end of 2014, 57 of Pozsgai's pieces, including tragedies, comedies, farces, fairy plays and plays with music, had been premiered in 87 theatres.

Between 1987 and 2018, Hungary performed as many as 94 of his dramas, many of which were played many times. These include dramas, tragicomedy, fairy tale plays, scripts of musicals, comedies, and low comedies. One of his best musicals is titled the Monte Cristo grófja (The Count of Monte Cristo) the music and lyrics of which were written by György Szomor.

=== Theatre director ===
Pozsgai has been a director employed frequently by Hungarian and foreign theaters since 1992. His repertoire includes his own works as well as Hungarian and universal classic pieces and those written by modern authors. He is delighted to direct Ibsen's dramas. He directed the theatrical version of Hungarian writer Sándor Márai's novel acclaimed worldwide in the French language in Geneva, Switzerland and Avignon, France. His oeuvre as a writer and director amalgamates in his adaptations of classical novels on stage, such as Stendhal's The Red and the Black, Victor Hugo's The Man Who Laughs, Dickens' David Copperfield, and others.

=== Screenplay writer and film director ===
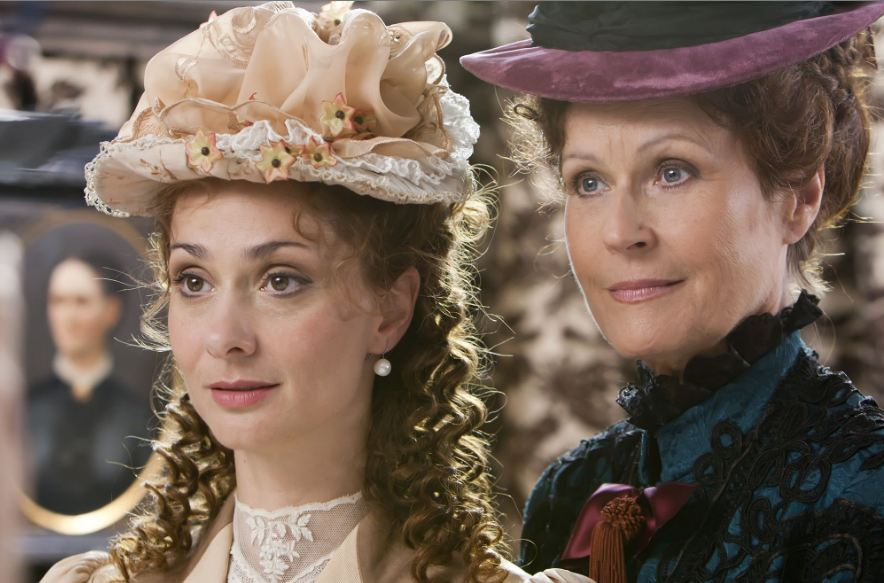
The Lover of the Soil (2010) (Éva Auksz as Teréz and Szilvia Sunyovszky as Olga)

Pozsgai started his career as a screenplay writer in the film industry, including the scripts of television series and fiction films. In 2006, he was invited to shoot his very first film titled Csendkút (The Well of Silence). Subsequently, he directed either a new television film, or television play, or feature film each year until 2015. His film titled A föld szeretője (The Lover of the Soil), which was nominated to the "A" category at the International Film Festival of India, was premiered in 2010. After that year it was shown at many festivals around the world.

Last film: THE DEVOTED /about Kalvin/ 2018, director-producer. Awards in 2018: best feature - Jesus Fest International Film Festival, Argentina / best feature Kolkata International Film Festival, India / Angel Peace Award, Monaco International Film Festival

From 2011 onward, Pozsgai wrote and directed many television films.

=== Book publisher ===
In 1988, Pozsgai founded Pátria Book Publishing at the Pátria Press by the support of the latter; the objective of Pátria Book Publishing is to publish the creations of contemporary Hungarian writers. In the course of its operation, this book publishing business published nearly one hundred books whose writers were nearly all considered contemporary in that period.

=== Other activities ===
During his career, Pozsgai was many times invited to counsel the secretary of cultural affairs. He is frequently invited to be a member of the jury at international festivals abroad, held primarily in the Middle and Far East, such as at Delhi, Baghdad, and Tehran.

Pozsgai is the chairman of the drama division of the Association of Hungarian Writers. He was employed as a tutor at the Hungarian University of Theatre and Film Arts and at other private schools of arts. He is the editor of a book series titled "Nemzeti Könyvtár" (National Library) that presents the values of Hungarian literature.

As a translator of literary artworks, Pozsgai translated the scripts of musicals into the Hungarian language.

Between 1987 and 2018, Pozsgai published eight books of drama in the Hungarian language. He frequently publishes articles and reports in Hungarian periodicals.

== Selected plays ==
Horatio

Pozsgai wrote his first play during the years of his mandatory military service, which was premiered 1988 in the Hevesi Sándor Theatre in Zalaegerszeg. This drama plays ten years after the demise of Hamlet and features the tragic faith of Horatio who suffers in the "suffocating embrace of power" sustained by the Norwegian Fortinbras.

The Prophet's Waltz

The scene is an imaginary beach: six people who declare themselves to be the one and only prophet fight for leadership, while they are waiting for the whale that would bring redemption.

The Virgin and the Beast

This play chronicles real events, namely the story of a homicidal maniac on APB and an innocent girl. The man's face was deformed during action. It is a tragicomedy, one of Pozsgai's most successful creations.

Gina and Fidel

This is a drama which recounts how Gina Lollobrigida interviewed Fidel Castro in Havana in 1974.

I Love You, Light

Set in Hungary in the 11th century, this is a historical absurd drama about the prince who was blinded and his family living in exile, with six characters.

To love until madness

This is a musical about the life of a well-known Hungarian singer, Pál Szécsi, who died many years ago.

Liselotte in May

This is a comedy-drama about a young lady whose tragic efforts to find a partner imply absurdities in the process. There are two actors, with the male actor playing seven roles. A lonely woman in her thirties, Liselotte, realises that the years are passing by without a partner and she desperately tries to get herself a man by various means. Through no fault of her own, each of her prospective partners dies on the first date... To date, the play has been performed in eighteen theatres in six languages.

Red Faust

A historical play about one of the great figures of 20th-century Hungarian history, Archbishop József Mindszenty, with six characters.

Black honey

Zsuzsanna Lórántffy, a major figure of the Hungarian Reformation, is the heroine of this historical tragicomedy from the 12th century.

Mother holle

This is a stage adaptation of the popular tale by the Grimm brothers, with six characters.

The young swineherd of Kecskemet

A folk tale which premiered 12 October 2007 at Katona József Theatre in Kecskemet.

Raid

Set in a mid-American city today, the main characters in this crime story are ten women who were rounded up by the police in a raid at night to find out which of them murdered the infamous and detested pimp, Lopez Dial. The investigation is complicated by the fact that the murder can be pinned on most of the women, and indeed most of them admit they did it. The detective has no ordinary task among the ten women determined as hell. There are one male and ten female roles.

Snow queen

A musical adaptation of Andersen's tale. The music was composed by Tibor Bornai.

The kid

A musical based on Chaplin's film The Kid. The piece has been played in theatres around Hungary; the production in Pécs is the twelfth. The music was composed by Tibor Nagy.

Merry madman (Mozart and Constanze)

This play features two characters, Mozart and his wife, Constanze, whose story recounts the conflict of their passionate lives. Mozart is on his death bed, but before he breathes his last, he wishes to confess to his loyal partner Constanze all the indiscretions he has committed over the years. Constanze, however, has a riposte, relating her own affairs to him. The confessions degenerate into an awful fight between the two. The play has been performed in several theatres in Hungary and abroad. There are two roles: man and a woman.

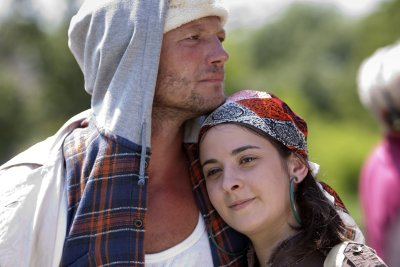
András Stohl and Kata Szvetnyik in the movie Janus

Janus (absurd play)

This play features two legendary figures of Hungarian humanism and 15th-century Renaissance history: Janus Pannonius, the well-known poet, and his friend King Matthias. Before Janus Pannonius died, he organised a plot against his friend. Ever since this has puzzled Hungarian historians. The play offers one explanation that might have happened. An absurd drama with five roles, one woman and four men.

Embers

A stage adaptation of Sándor Márai's internationally renowned novel (Embers) translated into twenty-two languages. A meeting of two elderly men focusing on an old affair in which they loved the same woman. There are three male and two female roles.

The red and the black

A stage adaptation of the world-famous Stendhal's novel, with ten male and five female roles.

Arthur and Paul

This play chronicles the imagined encounter of Arthur Rimbaud and Paul Verlaine in Africa.

The Count of Monte Cristo

A musical based on the novel (The Count of Monte Cristo) by Alexandre Dumas. Police arrest young Edmond Dantes and lock him up in the prison of Château d'If from where there is no return. After many years he escapes and becomes the holder of a fabulous treasure. Disguised as the Count of Monte Cristo, he begins his journey to take revenge on those who imprisoned him. Songs and performance by György Szomor.

GINA AND FIDEL about meeting between Gina Lollobrigida and Fidel Castro in 1974. First premiere in Graz, 2017. Satirata Theatre, Bulgary 2017. Budapest 2018. In german, english, spanish translation also,

=== Dramas abroad ===
In 2000, the very first non-Hungarian premier took place in Graz, Austria in the German language: it was titled the Prófétakeringő (Prophetenwalzer / The Prophet's Waltz). After that many of his dramas were played in Graz, Austria. This is the city where his creation titled Liselotte és a május (Liselotte und der Mai / Liselotte in May) and Boldog bolondok (Mozart und Konstanze oder Die liebenden Verrückten / Merry madmen) started its series of sensation abroad.

Liselotte in May is the author's most performed play abroad; it has been translated into the English, Macedonian, Bulgarian, Romanian, French, Norwegian, Serbian, Croatian, and Hindi languages. Between 1999 and 2015, it was premiered twenty-two times all over the world from Sofia, Bulgaria to New York City, and from Geneva, Switzerland to Vancouver, Canada. Translated into several languages, his drama Boldog bolondok earned similar acclamation. Translated into the Hindi and Bengali languages, his drama titled A szűz és a szörny (The Virgin and the Beast) was featured in India. In 2014, he wrote Gina és Fidel (Gina and Fidel) which was first premiered in the German language.

The play Red Faust was staged in English at the Bates Theater, Boston, USA.

Pozsgai directed his play Embers, based on a novel by Sándor Márai, at the Théâtre de l'Orangerie in Geneva, Switzerland, in the summer of 2005.

== Filmography ==
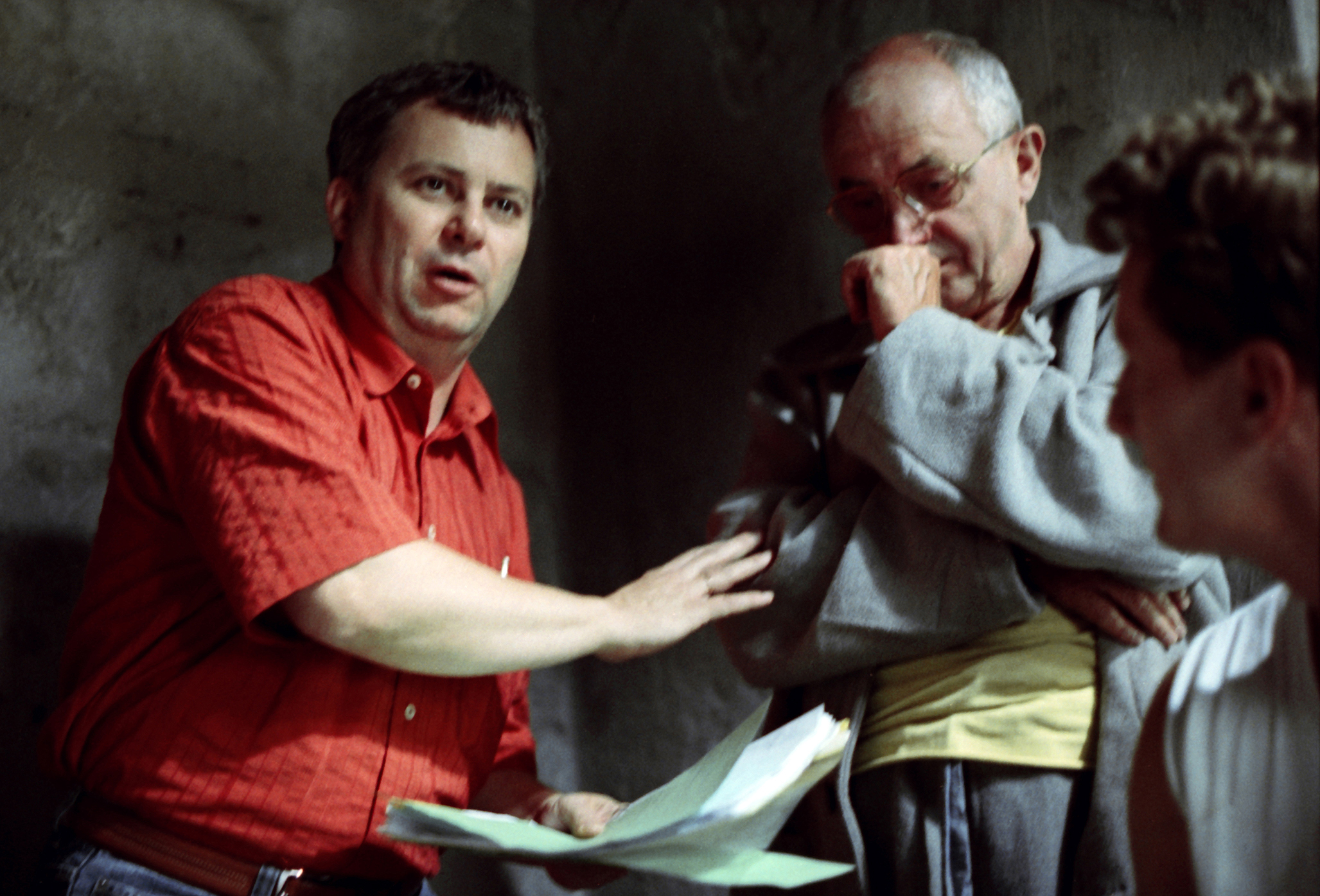
Zsolt Pozsgai and István Iglódi on the shooting of the movie 'Csendkút'.

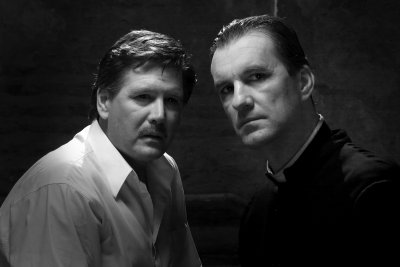
Armand Kautzky as Pál Jávor, Kapitány, Szegfű, Tildy, Pope and Adam Lux as József Mindszenty in the movie Szeretlek, Faust

- 2018 - Megszállottak /writer, director, producer. The best film prize in the Christian International Film Festival, Argentina, 2018/
- 2017 - Szabadonczok /TV Movie/ /writer, director, producer/
- 2015 − Farkasasszony (TV Movie) (writer, director)
- 2011 − II Janus (play) (writer, screenplay, director)
- 2010 − Szeretlek, Faust (writer, director)
- 2010 − A föld szeretője (writer, screenplay, director, executive producer, producer)
- 2009 − Boszorkánykör (writer)
- 2007 − Tűzvonalban (TV Series) (writer, series idea – 1 episode)
- 2007 − Szabadságharc Szebenben (TV Movie, play) (writer, screenplay, director)
- 2007 − Csendkút (writer, screenplay, director)
- 2007 − Konyec – Az utolsó csekk a pohárban (writer)
- 2006 − Árpád népe (TV Movie libretto) (writer)
- 2006 − A gyertyák csonkig égnek (Video) (writer, screenplay – as Pozsgay Zsolt)
- 2005 − Üvegfal (writer)
- 2002 − A ház emlékei (writer)
- 2000 − Meseautó (novel writer)
- 1998–2001 − Kisváros (TV Series) (written by – 52 episodes, 1998 – 2001; writer – 49 episodes, 1997 – 2001; screenplay – 1 episode, 2001)
- 1996 − Éretlenek (TV Series) (writer – 8 episodes)

== Awards ==
- Szép Ernő Prize – best new Hungarian play award, 1994 (for "Wax Bird" (Viaszmadár), Madách Theatre, Budapest)
- Europa Prize – Playwrights Festival, Berlin, 1996 (for "Arthur and Paul")
- First place, professional and spectators' prizes – Hungarian Playwrights Festival 1997
- First place, professional and spectators' prizes – Hungarian Playwrights Festival 1998
- First place, professional and spectators' prizes – Hungarian Playwrights Festival 1999
- Best script award – 33rd Hungarian Film Week; 2002 ("A ház emlékei" – with Dezső Zsigmond and József Dörner)
- Golden Lion Prize, best dramatist – Grand Prize of the Persian Academy, 2006
- Creative recognition – EMI Music Publishing's 2012 ("A kölyök" / "The kid" musical – with Tibor Nagy and Iván Bradányi)
- Best play – Móricz Zsigmond Theatre in Nyíregyháza, "Fast Playwright" Competition 2015 ("Riport a pesti gyerekekről, 1908" / Reportage about children from Pest, 1908)
