= The Pagan Madonna =

- Directed by: Gyula Mészáros
- Starring: István Bujtor; András Kern
- Release date: 28 May 1981
- Running time: 1h 38min
- Country: Hungary
- Language: Hungarian

The Pagan Madonna is a 1981 Hungarian crime action comedy film directed by Gyula Mészáros.

== Cast ==
- István Bujtor - Csöpi Ötvös
- András Kern - Dr. Tibor Kardos
- Péter Benkő - Szemere detective
- Ferenc Zenthe - Captain Záray
- László Bánhidi - Matuska
- Mária Gór Nagy - Zsuzsa
- Ferenc Kállai - István Csík
- Gabi Pálok - Bence, Matuska's grandson
- István Kovács - Gábor Soltész
