= András Kern =

Hungarian actor (born 1948)

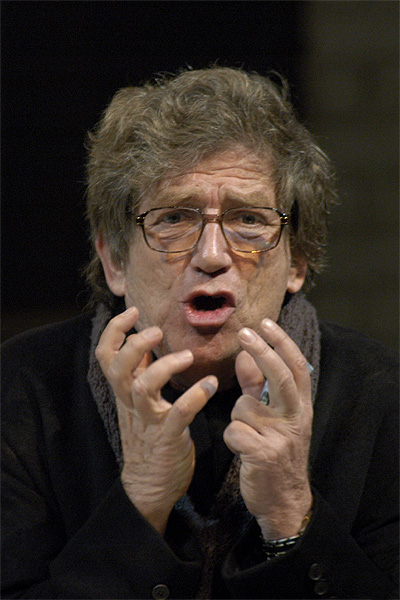
- Kern in 2008
- Born: 28 January 1948 (age 78); Budapest, Hungary
- Occupations: Actor; producer; writer; singer; comedian
- Years active: 1968–

András Kern (born 28 January 1948) is a Hungarian actor, producer, writer, singer and comedian.

== Life ==
In 1965, Kern produced a film with a friend, entitled Mi Lesz? (What will happen?), and subsequently won first prize in the 13th Hungarian National Amateur Film Festival.

In 1970, he graduated from the Academy of Drama and Film in Budapest. He has appeared in numerous films, has written and appeared in many radio sitcoms as well as in many popular Hungarian TV shows such as Heti Hetes and Activity Show. He dubbed Woody Allen in several movies.

== Selected filmography ==
- Stars of Eger (1968)
- 141 Minutes from the Unfinished Sentence (1975)
- The Pagan Madonna (1981)
- Oh, Bloody Life (1984)
- Out of Order (1997)
- 6:3 Play It Again Tutti (1999)

== See also ==
- Hungarian pop
