= Deaths in December 2018 =

The following is a list of notable deaths in December 2018.

Entries for each day are listed alphabetically by surname. A typical entry lists information in the following sequence:

- Name, age, country of citizenship at birth, subsequent country of citizenship (if applicable), reason for notability, cause of death (if known), and reference.

== December 2018 ==
=== 1 ===
- Ken Berry, 85, American actor (F Troop, Mayberry R.F.D., Mama's Family).
- Taramon Bibi, 62, Bangladeshi independence militant (Mukti Bahini).
- Tony Briscoe, 79, South African Olympic swimmer.
- Averroes Bucaram, 64, Ecuadorian politician, Speaker of National Congress (1985–1986, 1990) and MP (1984–1986, 1988–1992).
- Ennio Fantastichini, 63, Italian actor (Open Doors, At the End of the Night, Loose Cannons), Donatello winner (2010), leukemia.
- Frederick Fasehun, 83, Nigerian physician and politician, founder of the Oodua Peoples Congress.
- P. M. Forni, 67, Italian-American academic, Parkinson's disease.
- Shan Goshorn, 61, American Cherokee artist, cancer.
- Anwar Hossain, 70, Bangladeshi photographer.
- Ivan Katardžiev, 92, Macedonian historian.
- Vivian Lynn, 87, New Zealand artist.
- Phineas Makhurane, Zimbabwean academic, Vice-Chancellor of the National University of Science and Technology.
- Dave Mantel, 37, Dutch actor (Goede tijden, slechte tijden).
- Bernd Martin, 63, German footballer (VfB Stuttgart, Bayern Munich, West Germany).
- Judy McBurney, 70, Australian actress (Prisoner, Always Greener, The Young Doctors), cancer.
- Patricia Head Minaldi, 59, American federal judge, United States District Court for the Western District of Louisiana (since 2003).
- Calvin Newborn, 85, American jazz guitarist.
- Maria Pacôme, 95, French actress.
- K. Punnaiah, 94, Indian judge and politician, MLA (1955–1961).
- Pauls Putniņš, 81, Latvian playwright, journalist and politician.
- Scott Stearney, 58, American vice admiral, Commander of the Fifth Fleet (2018).
- Marvin Terrell, 80, American football player (Dallas Texans, Kansas City Chiefs).
- Stefanie Tücking, 56, German radio and television presenter (Südwestrundfunk), pulmonary embolism.
- Jody Williams, 83, American blues musician, cancer.
- Zhang Ouying, 43, Chinese football player (China national team) and coach, lung cancer.
- Shoucheng Zhang, 55, Chinese-born American physicist, member of the National Academy of Sciences.

=== 2 ===
- Paul 'Trouble' Anderson, 59, British DJ.
- Gene Babb, 83, American football player (San Francisco 49ers, Dallas Cowboys, Houston Oilers).
- Séry Bailly, 70, Ivorian writer and politician, Minister of Communication (2002–2003), complications from surgery.
- Jean-François Ballester, 53, French figure skating coach, heart attack.
- Lothar Baumgarten, 74, German conceptual artist.
- Ugo De Censi, 94, Italian-Peruvian priest.
- Bettye Davis, 80, American politician.
- Martin B. Dickman, 65, American biologist.
- Wilmer Clemont Fields, 96, American Southern Baptist minister and newspaper editor.
- Al Frazier, 83, American football player (Toronto Argonauts, Ottawa Rough Riders, Denver Broncos).
- Sergey Popov, 89, Soviet Olympic hurdler.
- Luan Qerimi, 89, Albanian actor.
- Perry Robinson, 80, American jazz musician.
- Gunwantrao Rambhau Sarode, 78, Indian politician, member of the Lok Sabha (1991–2001).
- Tim Seibert, 91, American architect.
- Paul Sherwen, 62, English racing cyclist (1987 National Champion) and sportscaster, heart failure.
- William James Lanyon Smith, 96, New Zealand naval officer.
- Michael James Snyder, 68, American business executive, CEO of Red Robin (2000–2005), suicide by gunshot.

=== 3 ===
- Markus Beyer, 47, German Olympic boxer (1992, 1996), WBC super middleweight champion (1999–2000, 2003–2004, 2004–2006).
- Andrei Bitov, 81, Russian writer.
- Philip Bosco, 88, American actor (Lend Me a Tenor, Working Girl, My Best Friend's Wedding), Tony winner (1989), complications from dementia.
- Justin Cartwright, 75, South African-born British novelist.
- Albert Frère, 92, Belgian businessman.
- Fred Greenstein, 88, American political scientist.
- Giorgio Grilz, 88, Italian Olympic swimmer (1952).
- John Heffernan, 84, American actor (The Sting, Bringing Out the Dead, Mary Hartman, Mary Hartman).
- Florence Hui, 44, Hong Kong politician, Undersecretary for Home Affairs (2008–2017), breast cancer.
- Toby Jessel, 84, British politician, MP (1970–1997).
- Tom Johnson, 73, American politician, member of the Illinois House of Representatives and Senate, cancer.
- Kim Chol-man, 98, North Korean politician and military officer, Member of the Politburo (1980–1981), bladder cancer.
- Elżbieta Krysińska, 90, Polish Olympic athlete (1952).
- Karre Mastanamma, 107, Indian internet chef.
- Roger Mercer, 74, British archaeologist.
- Mendi Msimang, 78, South African politician, Treasurer of the African National Congress (1997–2017).
- Mervin E. Muller, 90, American computer scientist and statistician.
- Geoff Murphy, 80, New Zealand film director (Goodbye Pork Pie, Young Guns II, Under Siege 2: Dark Territory).
- George Nassar, 86, American murderer, prostate cancer.
- Josep Lluís Núñez, 87, Spanish businessman, President of F.C. Barcelona (1978–2000).
- Megumi Ohnaka, 94, Japanese composer.
- Miguel Primo de Rivera y Urquijo, 84, Spanish aristocrat (Duke of Primo de Rivera) and politician, Mayor of Jerez (1965–1971) and Senator.
- Kevin Ruane, 86, English journalist.
- Robert F. Ruth, 97, American politician, member of the South Dakota House of Representatives (1969–1970).
- Gordon Sandison, 69, Scottish operatic baritone.
- Hans-Günther Thalheim, 94, German linguist and writer.
- Alex Wizbicki, 97, American football player (Buffalo Bills, Green Bay Packers).
- Kenneth Yen, 53, Taiwanese businessman, Chairman of China Motor Corporation and Yulon, esophageal cancer.
- David E. Zitarelli, 77, American mathematician.

=== 4 ===
- Harold Barrett, 83, Canadian politician.
- Kadyrzhan Batyrov, 62, Kyrgyz businessman and politician, heart attack.
- Victor Campos, 83, American actor (Cade's County, Scarface, Juice).
- Ivan Derventski, 86, Bulgarian footballer.
- Nh. Dini, 82, Indonesian novelist and feminist, traffic collision.
- Selma Engel-Wijnberg, 96, Dutch Holocaust survivor, escapee from Sobibor.
- Brian Ferriman, 68, Canadian-born American music manager.
- Jacques Gansler, 84, American aerospace electronics engineer.
- Lester Kinsolving, 90, American political radio host (WCBM).
- Michael McComie, 46, Trinidadian football player and manager (Joe Public), brain tumour.
- Sidy Lamine Niasse, 68, Senegalese press owner (WalFadjri).
- Sam Nover, 77, American sportscaster (NBC, WKBD-TV, WPXI).
- Carol Rhodes, 59, Scottish painter, complications from motor neurone disease.
- Nika Rurua, 50, Georgian politician, Minister of Culture (2009–2012), heart attack.
- Rose Vesper, 81, American politician.

=== 5 ===
- John Armstrong, 83, New Zealand politician, MP (1990–1993).
- John Beavis, 78, British surgeon.
- Evy Berggren, 84, Swedish gymnast, Olympic champion (1952).
- Peter Boizot, 89, British restaurateur (PizzaExpress) and football club owner (Peterborough United).
- Alex Boraine, 87, South African politician, MP (1974–1986).
- Marie-Thérèse Bourquin, 102, Belgian lawyer.
- Bruce Buggins, 83, Australian cricketer.
- Dynamite Kid, 60, English professional wrestler (WWF, NJPW, Stampede).
- Thor Hansen, 71, Norwegian poker player, cancer.
- Jim House, 70, American politician, member of the Arkansas House of Representatives (2007–2011), tractor accident.
- Jim Jamieson, 75, American professional golfer.
- Inge Johansen, 90, Norwegian engineer and educator, rector of the Norwegian Institute of Technology (1976–1984).
- Gary McPherson, 82, American college basketball coach (VMI, Alderson Broaddus, West Virginia).
- Lynn Schindler, 74, American politician, member of the Washington House of Representatives (1998–2009).
- Harry W. Shlaudeman, 92, American diplomat.
- José Tarciso de Souza, 67, Brazilian footballer (Grêmio, Goiás, Coritiba), bone cancer.
- Bobby Treviño, 73, Mexican baseball player (California Angels).
- Julia Vinograd, 74, American poet, colon cancer.

=== 6 ===
- José de Anchieta Júnior, 53, Brazilian politician, Governor of Roraima (2007–2014), heart attack.
- Thomas Baptiste, 89, Guyanese-born British actor (Coronation Street, Sunday Bloody Sunday).
- Kuslan Budiman, 83, Indonesian poet and writer, pancreatic cancer.
- Ace Cannon, 84, American saxophonist.
- José Castillo, 37, Venezuelan professional baseball player (Pittsburgh Pirates, San Francisco Giants), traffic collision.
- Robin Clark, 83, New Zealand-born British chemist.
- Walter E. H. Cockle, 79, American historian.
- Dónall Farmer, 81, Irish actor (Glenroe), film director and producer.
- Győző Forintos, 83, Hungarian chess player and economist.
- Andrew Frierson, 94, American operatic baritone.
- Al Gallagher, 73, American baseball player (San Francisco Giants), complications from diabetes.
- Peter Gillon, 79, Australian Olympic rower.
- Larry Hennig, 82, American professional wrestler (AWA, NWA, WWWF), kidney failure.
- Ivan Hladush, 89, Ukrainian police officer and politician, Minister of Internal Affairs (1982–1990).
- Joseph Joffo, 87, French author (A Bag of Marbles).
- Kent Karosen, 53, American businessman.
- Michael Kent, 76, Australian businessman and politician.
- Laszlo Lorand, 95, Hungarian-American biochemist.
- Jim Meehan, 66, American poker player.
- Aleksandr Minayev, 64, Russian football player (Spartak Moscow, Dynamo Moscow, national team) and manager.
- Murray Murphey, 90, American historian.
- Willie Murrell, 77, American basketball player.
- Jerome O'Shea, 87, Irish Gaelic footballer (South Kerry, Kerry, Munster).
- Isiah Robertson, 69, American football player (Los Angeles Rams, Buffalo Bills), traffic collision.
- Frank Joseph Rodimer, 91, American Roman Catholic prelate, Bishop of Paterson (1977–2004).
- Tim Rossovich, 72, American football player (Philadelphia Eagles) and actor (The Long Riders, The Sting II).
- Pete Shelley, 63, English musician and songwriter (Buzzcocks), heart attack.
- John Roxburgh Smith, 82, Canadian politician.
- Ken Smith, 90, English footballer (Gateshead, Blackpool).
- Luis Valbuena, 33, Venezuelan professional baseball player (Chicago Cubs, Houston Astros, Los Angeles Angels), traffic collision.

=== 7 ===
- Mario Becerril, 101, Mexican Olympic equestrian.
- Belisario Betancur, 95, Colombian politician, President (1982–1986), kidney infection.
- Reby Cary, 98, American politician, member of the Texas House of Representatives (1979–1985).
- Nancio Carrillo, 68, Cuban Olympic boxer.
- Ljupka Džundeva, 84, Macedonian actress (Macedonian Bloody Wedding, Gypsy Magic).
- Shmuel Flatto-Sharon, 88, Polish-born French-Israeli politician, member of the Knesset (1977–1981).
- Carlos Gallisá, 85, Puerto Rican politician and independence advocate, cancer.
- Colin Guest, 81, Australian Test cricketer (Victoria, Western Australia).
- Asrarul Haq Qasmi, 76, Indian politician, member of the Lok Sabha (since 2009), heart attack.
- Paul Henderson, 79, American journalist, Pulitzer Prize recipient (1982), lung cancer.
- Ferenc Hirt, 51, Hungarian politician, MP (since 2006).
- Fred Horn, 93, American politician.
- Max Huber, 73, American football player (Calgary Stampeders, BC Lions, Edmonton Eskimos).
- Håkan Jeppsson, 57, Swedish sports executive, chairman of Malmö FF (since 2010).
- The Mascara Snake, 70, American artist and musician (Captain Beefheart and his Magic Band), traffic collision.
- Nguyễn Văn Trân, 101, Vietnamese politician, Minister of Transport (1955–1960).
- Paul Niedermann, 91, German-French journalist and photographer.
- Luigi Radice, 83, Italian football player (Milan) and manager (Torino, Inter Milan), complications from Alzheimer's disease.
- John Safer, 96, American sculptor.
- Gerald C. Smoak, 88, American politician.
- Charles Weldon, 78, American actor and director.

=== 8 ===
- Lyudmila Alexeyeva, 91, Russian human rights activist.
- Marijon Ancich, 81, American football coach, complications from a stroke.
- Evelyn Berezin, 93, American computer designer.
- Jakelin Caal, 7, Guatemalan migrant child in US custody, dehydration, shock and liver failure.
- Enrico Crispolti, 85, Italian art critic and historian.
- Wilfred DeFour, 100, Panamanian-American pilot (Tuskegee Airmen).
- Rosanell Eaton, 97, American civil rights activist.
- Walter J. Floss Jr., 95, American politician, member of the New York State Senate (1979–1988).
- Rod Jones, 54, American football player (Kansas City Chiefs), suicide by gunshot.
- Art Lentz, 92, American basketball player.
- Alf MacLochlainn, 92, Irish librarian.
- Michele Monti, 48, Italian Olympic judoka (2000, 2004), cancer.
- Jamal Nebez, 85, Iraqi Kurdish linguist, mathematician and writer.
- Roger, 12, Australian red kangaroo.
- Dusty Spittle, 79, New Zealand country singer, pneumonia.
- Jolanta Szczypińska, 61, Polish politician, member of the Sejm (since 2004), urinary tract disease.
- Pentti Tiusanen, 69, Finnish politician, MP (1995–2011).
- Wang Ruilin, 88, Chinese general and politician, member of the Central Military Commission (1995–2003).
- Sir David Weatherall, 85, British physician and molecular geneticist.

=== 9 ===
- Eric Anderson, 48, American basketball player (Indiana Hoosiers, New York Knicks).
- Patrick Appleford, 93, British Anglican priest and hymn writer.
- Mohammed Aruwa, 70, Nigerian politician, Senator for Kaduna State (1999–2007).
- Yigal Bashan, 68, Israeli singer and composer, suicide by stabbing.
- Tim Bassett, 67, American basketball player (San Diego Conquistadors, New Jersey Nets, San Antonio Spurs), cancer.
- Jon T. Benn, 83, American businessman and actor (The Way of the Dragon, The Man with the Iron Fists, Fearless).
- Robert Bergland, 90, American politician, U.S. Representative from Minnesota's 7th district (1971–1977), Secretary of Agriculture (1977–1981).
- Brian Blank, 65, American mathematician, heart failure.
- William Blum, 85, American historian and author (Killing Hope, Rogue State), kidney failure.
- C. Todd Conover, 79, American banking regulator, Comptroller of the Currency (1981–1985).
- Melvin Dummar, 74, American suspected fraudster.
- Tor Fretheim, 72, Norwegian journalist and children's writer.
- Riccardo Giacconi, 87, Italian-born American astrophysicist, Nobel Prize laureate (2002).
- John Joseph Gibbons, 94, American judge, Chief Judge of the U.S. Court of Appeals for the Third Circuit (1987–1990).
- Bob Giggie, 85, American baseball player (Milwaukee Braves, Kansas City Athletics).
- Elisapee Ishulutaq, 93, Canadian Inuk artist.
- Tom Johnson, 92, English footballer (Horden Community Welfare).
- Rodney Kageyama, 77, American actor (Gung Ho, Pretty Woman, Showdown in Little Tokyo).
- Norbert Ostrowski, 80, American automobile designer.
- Peng Sixun, 99, Chinese medicinal chemist, member of the Chinese Academy of Engineering.
- Guire Poulard, 76, Haitian Roman Catholic prelate, Archbishop of Port-au-Prince (2011–2017), pancreatic cancer.
- Wendy Ramshaw, 79, British artist and designer.
- Gordon Scholes, 87, Australian politician, Speaker of the House of Representatives (1975–1976), Minister for Defence (1983–1984) and Territories (1984–1987).
- Michael Seymour, 86, British production designer (Alien, Beverly Hills Cop III, Mr. Destiny), BAFTA winner (1980).
- Yumiko Shige, 53, Japanese sailor, Olympic silver medallist (1996), breast cancer.
- Dick Van Orden, 97, American rear admiral.
- Almyra Maynard Watson, 101, American military nurse.
- Heinz Weisenbach, 73, German Olympic ice hockey player.

=== 10 ===
- George Blakley, 86, American cryptographer.
- Alvin Epstein, 93, American actor and director.
- Alexandra Hamilton, Duchess of Abercorn, 72, British aristocrat.
- C. N. Balakrishnan, 84, Indian politician, kidney and heart failure.
- Jean Baldassari, 92, French cyclist
- Bob and John, 15, American racehorse, euthanized.
- Chiang Pin-kung, 85, Taiwanese politician, Minister of Economic Affairs (1993–1996), Vice President of the Legislative Yuan (2002–2005), multiple organ failure.
- Fazio Fabbrini, 92, Italian politician, Senator (1968–1976) and Mayor of Siena (1965–1966).
- Mushirul Hasan, 69, Indian historian.
- Raoul Hunter, 92, Canadian sculptor.
- Salihu Ibrahim, 83, Nigerian general, Chief of Army Staff (1990–1993).
- Mike King, 93, Canadian football player (Edmonton Eskimos, Toronto Argonauts).
- Paulette Laurent, 92, French Olympic shot putter.
- Alan Brock MacFarlane, 94, Canadian lawyer and politician.
- Andrew G. T. Moore II, 83, American attorney.
- Johann Georg Reißmüller, 86, German journalist and publisher (Frankfurter Allgemeine Zeitung).
- Robert Spaemann, 91, German Roman Catholic philosopher.
- Xavier Tilliette, 97, French philosopher and theologian.
- Janyce Wiebe, 59, American computer scientist, leukemia.
- Stanisław Wierzbicki, 59, Polish Olympic rower.

=== 11 ===
- Thomas B. Allen, 89, American author and historian.
- Scott Dillon, 90, Australian surfer.
- Melbourne Gass, 79, Canadian politician.
- Winifred Griffin, 86, New Zealand Olympic swimmer (1956), British Empire Games silver medalist (1950), cancer.
- Helga Henning, 81, German Olympic athlete.
- Petrus Iilonga, 71, Namibian politician and political prisoner, Deputy Minister of Defence (since 2012).
- John Henry Jackson, 80, American-born Canadian football player and restaurateur.
- Harold L. Kahn, 88, American historian.
- Eleanor Maccoby, 101, American psychologist.
- Bill Siegel, 55, American documentary producer and director (The Trials of Muhammad Ali, The Weather Underground), heart attack.
- Walter Smith, 98, English land surveyor, Director General of the Ordnance Survey (1977–1985).
- Hiwi Tauroa, 91, New Zealand rugby union player (New Zealand Māori) and coach (Counties), Race Relations Conciliator (1980–1986).
- Walter Williams, 35, Honduran footballer (Vida, Real Sociedad, national team), stroke.
- Lia Wyler, 84, Brazilian translator (Harry Potter).
- Sir Jack Zunz, 94, South African-born British civil engineer (Sydney Opera House).

=== 12 ===
- James C. Calaway, 87, American businessman.
- Hazel Campbell, 78, Jamaican author.
- Prince Casinader, 92, Sri Lankan politician, MP (1989–1994).
- Carlos Cecconato, 88, Argentinian footballer (El Porvenir, Independiente, national team).
- Joe Conrad, 88, American professional golfer.
- William G. Dabney, 94, American corporal.
- Iraj Danaeifard, 67, Iranian footballer (Taj, Pas Tehran, national team), heart attack.
- Noël Duval, 88, French archaeologist.
- Russ Ekeblad, 72, American bridge player.
- Wilhelm Genazino, 75, German journalist and author.
- Curtis Grimm, 65, American economist, pancreatic cancer.
- Upali Kannangara, 67, Sri Lankan musician.
- Ishwari Prasad Gupta, 87, Indian diplomat and civil servant, Lieutenant Governor of the Andaman and Nicobar Island (1996–2001).
- W. Brantley Harvey Jr., 88, American politician, Lieutenant Governor of South Carolina (1975–1979), member of the South Carolina House of Representatives (1958–1975).
- Ferenc Kósa, 81, Hungarian film director (The Upthrown Stone, Ten Thousand Days).
- Bernard Lloyd, 84, Welsh actor (The Signalman).
- George W. T. Loo, 87, American politician.
- James Lyons, 91, American admiral, Commander, U.S. Pacific Fleet (1985–1987).
- Billy MacLeod, 76, American baseball player (Boston Red Sox).
- Nelson Martínez, 67, Venezuelan politician, Minister of Petroleum (2017), President of PDVSA (2017).
- Meng Lang, 57, Chinese poet and dissident, lung cancer.
- Audrey Moore, 89, American politician, Alzheimer's disease.
- William Newsom, 84, American judge.
- Odile Rodin, 81, French actress (Futures Vedettes, Si Paris nous était conté) and model.
- Vahid Sayadi Nasiri, 37, Iranian human rights activist and hunger striker, starvation.
- Jim Spainhower, 90, American politician.
- Daniel Owen Stolpe, 79, American artist.
- Pavle Strugar, 85, Montenegrin military officer (Yugoslav People's Army) and convicted war criminal.
- Jane Ellen Usher, 101, Belizean politician, MP (1979–1989) and President of the Senate (1989–1993).
- Wang Lianzheng, 88, Chinese agronomist and politician, Vice Governor of Heilongjiang, Vice Minister of Agriculture.
- Joseph Zeller, 100, American politician, member of the Pennsylvania House of Representatives (1971–1980).

=== 13 ===
- Ajayan, 68, Indian film director (Perumthachan), heart attack.
- Abdullah Ayub, 92, Malaysian civil servant, Chief Secretary to the Government (1979–1982), stroke.
- Roy Bailey, 89, Canadian politician.
- Bill Fralic, 56, American football player (Atlanta Falcons, Detroit Lions, Pittsburgh Panthers), cancer.
- John Fujioka, 93, American actor (The Last Flight of Noah's Ark, Who Finds a Friend Finds a Treasure, American Ninja).
- Gao Jindian, 79, Chinese military officer (People's Liberation Army).
- Seán Garland, 84, Irish politician, General Secretary of the Workers' Party (1977–1990).
- Christopher Hooley, 90, British mathematician.
- Matti Kassila, 94, Finnish film director (Komisario Palmun erehdys, The Harvest Month, The Scarlet Dove).
- Sharmeen Khan, 46, Pakistani cricketer (national team), pneumonia.
- Lawrence Klecatsky, 77, American Olympic rower.
- Noah Klieger, 92, Israeli journalist and sports administrator (Maccabi Tel Aviv B.C.).
- Wäinö Korhonen, 91, Finnish Olympic fencer.
- Sheena Mackintosh, 90, British Olympic alpine skier (1948, 1952).
- Timothy C. May, 67, American technical and political writer (Cyphernomicon).
- Mike Montler, 74, American football player (Buffalo Bills).
- Lisa Peattie, 94, American anthropologist.
- André Queillé, 87, French Olympic boxer (1952).
- Tulsi Ramsay, 74, Indian film director (Zee Horror Show, Veerana, Guest House), heart attack.
- J. Evan Sadler, 67, American hematologist (Washington University School of Medicine).
- Don Webster, 79, Canadian-American television host (Upbeat, Bowling for Dollars, The Morning Exchange) and meteorologist (WEWS-TV).
- Nancy Wilson, 81, American singer ("(You Don't Know) How Glad I Am"), Grammy winner (1965, 2005, 2007), kidney cancer.
- Yuan Mu, 90, Chinese politician, director of the State Council Research Office.

=== 14 ===
- Vida Chenoweth, 90, American marimbist and ethnomusicologist.
- Gilberto Duavit Sr., 84, Filipino entrepreneur and politician, founder of GMA Network Inc., member of the House of Representatives (1994–2001).
- Salvador Flores Huerta, 84, Mexican Roman Catholic prelate, Bishop of Ciudad Lázaro Cárdenas (1993–2006).
- Horst Herold, 95, German police officer, President of the Federal Criminal Police Office (1971–1981).
- Amjad Hossain, 76, Bangladeshi actor and director (Golapi Ekhon Traine), complications from a stroke.
- Patrick Daniel Koroma, 68, Sierra Leonean Roman Catholic prelate, Bishop of Kenema (since 2002).
- Li Chengxiang, 87, Chinese ballet dancer and choreographer (Red Detachment of Women), Director of the National Ballet.
- Remedios Loza, 69, Bolivian artisan, TV presenter and activist, member of the Plurinational Legislative Assembly (1998–2002), stomach cancer.
- Zainuddin Maidin, 79, Malaysian politician, Minister of Information (2006–2008), heart attack.
- Joe Osborn, 81, American bass guitarist (The Wrecking Crew).
- Johnny Reagan, 92, American college baseball coach (Murray State Racers).
- John Seedborg, 75, American football player (Washington Redskins).
- Edmond Simeoni, 84, French politician and Corsican nationalism leader.
- Joan Steinbrenner, 83, American philanthropist and sports executive, vice chairperson of the New York Yankees.
- Rachel Stephens, 88, American actress (Bigger Than Life, The True Story of Jesse James, Richie Rich).
- Thomas Thennatt, 65, Indian Roman Catholic prelate, Bishop of Gwalior (since 2016).
- Eyþór Þorláksson, 88, Icelandic guitarist and composer.
- Jean-Pierre Van Rossem, 73, Belgian economist and politician, member of the Chamber of Representatives (1991–1995) and the Flemish Parliament (1992–1995).

=== 15 ===
- Adrian Arnold, 86, American politician.
- Jerry Chesnut, 87, American songwriter ("Good Year for the Roses", "T-R-O-U-B-L-E", "It's Four in the Morning").
- Eryue He, 73, Chinese writer.
- Ronald Gajraj, 65, Guyanese politician, Minister of Home Affairs (1999–2005), heart attack.
- Grant Golden, 89, American tennis player.
- Sylvester Greenaway, 72, Montserratian cricketer.
- Matthew O. Howard, 62, American social worker.
- Ron Kent, 86-87, American woodturner.
- Ralph Koltai, 94, German-born British stage designer.
- Milunka Lazarević, 86, Serbian chess player.
- Arthur Maia, 56, Brazilian composer and musician, heart attack.
- Philippe Moureaux, 79, Belgian politician, Minister-President of the French Community (1981–1985, 1988).
- David Myles, 93, British politician, MP for Banffshire (1979–1983).
- Robert Nelson, 74, American economist.
- Dušan Nikolić, 65, Serbian footballer (Red Star Belgrade, Bolton Wanderers).
- Marc Olivier, 78, Belgian politician, MP (1974–1995) and Flemish Councillor (1995–1999).
- Guy Rétoré, 94, French actor.
- Harald Stabell, 71, Norwegian lawyer.
- Jacques Verdier, 61, French writer.
- Ellsworth Wareham, 104, American surgeon.
- John Williams, 89, American jazz pianist.
- Girma Wolde-Giorgis, 93, Ethiopian politician, President (2001–2013).
- Anat Zamir, 56, Israeli model and actress, drug overdose.

=== 16 ===
- Lawrence Allen, 97, British Olympic racewalker (1952).
- Tom Brownlee, 83, Scottish footballer (Walsall).
- Chiquetete, 70, Spanish flamenco and ballad singer, heart attack.
- John H. Dorsey, 80, American politician, member of the New Jersey Senate (1978–1994).
- Eraldo Isidori, 78, Italian politician, Deputy (2010–2012), complications from surgery.
- Geeta Iyengar, 74, Indian yoga teacher, heart attack.
- Karsten Johannessen, 93, Norwegian football manager (IK Start).
- Lewis Judd, 88, American psychiatrist, chair of University of California, San Diego psychiatry department, director of the National Institute of Mental Health, natural causes.
- Colin Kroll, 34, American entrepreneur, co-founder of Vine and HQ Trivia.
- Eugène Philippe LaRocque, 91, Canadian Roman Catholic prelate, Bishop of Alexandria-Cornwall (1974–2002).
- Lee Leonard, 89, American television host (The NFL Today, ESPN).
- Juan L. Maldonado, 70, Mexican-born American education administrator, President of Laredo Community College (2007–2016).
- Scott Matzka, 40, American ice hockey player (Grand Rapids Griffins, Örebro, Cardiff Devils), amyotrophic lateral sclerosis.
- John Ford Noonan, 77, American actor (Adventures in Babysitting) and playwright, heart failure.
- Mircea Petescu, 76, Romanian football player (Steaua București, UTA Arad) and manager (Sparta Rotterdam), Alzheimer's disease.
- Anca Pop, 34, Romanian-Canadian singer-songwriter, traffic collision.
- Giuseppe Sermonti, 93, Italian biologist and geneticist.
- Joseph Thomin, 87, French racing cyclist.
- Ron Waller, 85, American football player (Los Angeles Rams) and coach (San Diego Chargers).
- T. K. Wetherell, 72, American politician and academic administrator, Speaker of the Florida House of Representatives (1991–1992), President of Florida State University (2003–2010).
- John Wettaw, 79, American chemist (Northern Arizona University) and politician, member of the Arizona House of Representatives (1972–1992) and Senate (1993–2001).
- Roy Woolcott, 79, English footballer (Tottenham Hotspur, Gillingham, Chelmsford City).

=== 17 ===
- Arun Bhaduri, 75, Indian classical vocalist, respiratory disease.
- Jon Bluming, 85, Dutch martial artist and actor.
- Warren Boyd, 91, Australian Olympic swimmer (1948).
- Lawrence Curry, 82, American politician, member of the Pennsylvania House of Representatives (1993–2012).
- Gustavo L. Garcia, 84, American politician, mayor of Austin, Texas (2001–2003).
- Zura Karuhimbi, c. 93, Rwandan traditional healer, saved refugees during Rwandan genocide.
- Jorge Adolfo Carlos Livieres Banks, 87, Paraguayan Roman Catholic prelate, Bishop of Encarnación (1987–2003).
- Frank LoVuolo, 94, American football player.
- Galt MacDermot, 89, Canadian-American composer (Hair, Two Gentlemen of Verona) and pianist.
- Andrew MacLachlan, 77, Scottish cricketer and actor (A Fish Called Wanda, Time Bandits, The Adventures of Baron Munchausen).
- Penny Marshall, 75, American actress (Laverne & Shirley) and director (Big, A League of Their Own), heart failure.
- Paul Meister, 92, Swiss Olympic fencer.
- Amélie Mummendey, 74, German social psychologist.
- Oribe, 62, Cuban-born American hairstylist, heart attack.
- Dolores Parker, 99, American jazz singer.
- Rona Ramon, 54, Israeli educator and activist, cancer.
- Francis Roache, 82, American police officer and politician, Boston Police commissioner (1985–1993).
- James E. Rogers Jr., 71, American businessman (Duke Energy) and author.
- Andrey Shcharbakow, 27, Belarusian footballer (BATE Borisov, Slutsk, Vitebsk), traffic collision.
- David Shepherd, 94, American producer, director, and actor.
- Raven Wilkinson, 83, American ballerina.

=== 18 ===
- David C. H. Austin, 92, British rose breeder.
- Alex Badeh, 61, Nigerian air force officer, Chief of the Defence Staff (2014–2015), shot.
- Mike Barnard, 85, English footballer (Portsmouth) and cricketer (Hampshire), stroke.
- Ray Bethell, 90, English-born Canadian kite flyer.
- John Donald Currey, 86, British zoologist.
- Steve Daskewisz, 74, American actor and stuntman (Friday the 13th Part 2), complications from diabetes.
- Ali Ejaz, 77, Pakistani actor (Tiger Gang, Chor Machaye Shor).
- Rick L. Farrar, 58, American politician.
- Paul Frazier, 51, American football player (New Orleans Saints), colon cancer.
- Tulsi Giri, 92, Nepali politician, Prime Minister (1963, 1964–1965, 1975–1977), liver cancer.
- Ally Hill, 84, Scottish footballer (Clyde, Dundee, Falkirk).
- Masao Ito, 90, Japanese neuroscientist.
- Kazimierz Kutz, 89, Polish film director and politician.
- Gerald Larner, 82, English music critic (The Guardian, The Times), pulmonary thrombosis.
- Lucy Marlow, 86, American actress (My Sister Eileen).
- Peter Masterson, 84, American writer (The Best Little Whorehouse in Texas), director (The Trip to Bountiful), and actor (The Exorcist), complications from a fall.
- Robert Neild, 94, British economist.
- María Jesús Rosa, 44, Spanish boxer, WIBF world light flyweight champion (2003), cancer.
- Lewis Ryder, 77, British theoretical physicist.
- Shinobu Sekine, 75, Japanese judoka, Olympic champion (1972).
- Bill Slater, 91, English footballer (Wolverhampton Wanderers, national team), Alzheimer's disease.
- Saidul Anam Tutul, 68, Bangladeshi film director and editor, heart attack.
- Raimo Vartia, 81, Finnish Olympic basketball player (1964).

=== 19 ===
- Ron Abegglen, 81, American college basketball coach (Weber State Wildcats).
- Colin Barlow, 83, English football player and executive (Manchester City).
- Bhai, 83, Surinamese poet.
- Russell Carollo, 63, American journalist (Dayton Daily News, Los Angeles Times), Pulitzer Prize winner (1998).
- Jacques David, 87, French Roman Catholic prelate, Bishop of La Rochelle and Saintes (1985–1996) and Évreux (1996–2006).
- Tömür Dawamat, 91, Chinese politician, Chairman of the Xinjiang Autonomous region (1985–1993).
- Audrey Geisel, 97, American businesswoman.
- Norman Gimbel, 91, American Hall of Fame songwriter ("Canadian Sunset", "The Girl from Ipanema", "Killing Me Softly with His Song"), Oscar winner (1980).
- Mike Hiss, 77, American racing driver, cancer.
- Mel Hutchins, 90, American basketball player (BYU Cougars, Milwaukee Hawks).
- Masashi Ishibashi, 85, Japanese actor, heart failure.
- Hugh Jack, 89, Australian Olympic athlete (1956).
- Marshall Long, 82, American politician, member of the Kentucky Legislature (1982–2002), mayor of Shelbyville, Kentucky (1972–1981).
- Raúl Mata, 71, Mexican professional wrestler (EMLL, CWF, NWA Hollywood).
- Guy Modeste, 64, French footballer (Saint-Étienne), cancer.
- Anthony O'Grady, 71, Australian writer and music journalist, melanoma.
- Owen M. Panner, 94, American federal judge, U.S. District Court Judge for the District of Oregon (since 1980).
- Barbara Gardner Proctor, 85, American advertising executive, complications from hip surgery.
- Geetha Salam, 72, Indian actor (Mani Koya Kurup, Malabar Wedding, Romans).
- Bill Sellars, 93, British television director and producer (Doctor Who, All Creatures Great and Small, Triangle).
- Andrzej Skupiński, 66, Polish actor.
- Eva Tichauer, 100, German Holocaust survivor and author.
- Melanie Townsend, 50, Canadian art curator, cancer.
- Paul Ward, 81, American football player (Detroit Lions).
- Marty Zendejas, 54, American football player (Nevada Wolf Pack), beaten.

=== 20 ===
- F. W. Bernstein, 80, German poet and cartoonist.
- Pascal F. Calogero Jr., 87, American judge, Louisiana Supreme Court Chief Justice (1973–2008).
- Beatriz Capotosto, 56, Argentine Olympic hurdler.
- Randall Carrington, 84, New Zealand cricketer.
- Trevor Chinn, 81, New Zealand glaciologist.
- Don Cuppleditch, 95, British motorcycle speedway rider.
- Klaus Hagerup, 72, Norwegian author and actor (The Chieftain), colorectal cancer.
- David W. Henderson, 79, American mathematician, injuries sustained in traffic collision.
- Mike Hughes, 78, Welsh football player (Exeter City, Chesterfield) and manager (Cirencester Town).
- Barbara Jensen, 89, American Olympic swimmer.
- Dennis Johnson, 80, American mathematician and composer, complications from dementia.
- Stephen I. Katz, 77, American immunodermatologist.
- Michael C. Lovell, 88, American economist.
- Donald Moffat, 87, British-born American actor (The Thing, The Right Stuff, Clear and Present Danger), complications from a stroke.
- Robert E. Ornstein, 76, American psychologist.
- Henning Palner, 86, Danish actor (Jetpiloter, Slottet, Terror).
- Rocky Rees, 69, American football player and coach, cancer.
- Harold Roitenberg, 91, American businessman.
- Reg Wiebe, 55, Canadian-Dutch curler, aortic aneurysm.
- Danish Zehen, 22, Indian internet personality, traffic collision.

=== 21 ===
- Shirley Armstrong, 88, Irish Olympic fencer (1960).
- Dipali Barthakur, 77, Indian singer.
- Gerard Bernacki, 76, Polish Roman Catholic prelate, Auxiliary Bishop of Katowice (1988–2012).
- Lev Borodulin, 95, Soviet-born Israeli photographer.
- Mick Dyche, 67, English guitarist (Sniff 'n' the Tears), cancer.
- Carlos Feller, 96, Argentine operatic bass singer.
- Forrest Fezler, 69, American golfer and golf course designer, brain cancer.
- Fay Gock, 85, New Zealand horticulturalist.
- Edda Göring, 80, German nurse.
- Walter Patricio "Guacho" Arízala Vernaza, 29, Ecuadorian FARC dissident and drug lord, shot.
- Lars Hindmar, 97, Swedish racewalker.
- Tom Leonard, 74, Scottish poet.
- Michael O'Neill, 65, English poet and academic, cancer.
- Daniela Payssé, 72, Uruguayan politician, Deputy (2005–2015) and Senator (since 2015), heart attack.
- Prapanchan, 73, Indian writer, cancer.
- Laya Raki, 91, German actress and dancer.
- Daniel B. Walsh, 83, American politician.

=== 22 ===
- Paddy Ashdown, Baron Ashdown of Norton-sub-Hamdon, 77, British politician, high representative for Bosnia and Herzegovina (2002–2006), MP (1983–2001) and member of the House of Lords (since 2001), bladder cancer.
- Rodel Batocabe, 52, Filipino politician, member of the House of Representatives (2010–2018), shot.
- Jean Bourgain, 64, Belgian mathematician.
- Kelly Burnett, 92, Canadian ice hockey player (New York Rangers, Montreal Royals).
- Michael Dopita, 72, Czech-born Australian astronomer.
- Angélica García Arrieta, 60, Mexican public accountant and politician, Senator (since 2018) and founder of the National Regeneration Movement.
- Dayton Hyde, 93, American conservationist.
- Don Johnston, 89, South African Olympic swimmer.
- Robert Kerketta, 86, Indian Roman Catholic prelate, Bishop of Dibrugarh (1970–1980) and Tezpur (1980–2007).
- Gary N. Knoppers, 62, Canadian theologian, pancreatic cancer.
- Jane Langton, 95, American author.
- Jiko Luveni, 72, Fijian politician, Speaker of the Parliament (since 2014).
- Roger Owen, 83, British historian (Middle East).
- Sergey Psakhie, 66, Russian physicist.
- Simcha Rotem, 94, Polish-Israeli resistance fighter, last surviving Warsaw Ghetto Uprising fighter.
- Sir Peter Singer, 74, British jurist.
- Roberto Suazo Córdova, 91, Honduran politician, President (1982–1986).
- Talal bin Abdulaziz Al Saud, 87, Saudi prince and politician.
- Willy Taminiaux, 79, Belgian politician, Minister in the Walloon Government (1994–1995 and 1995–1999) and Senator (1985–1995).
- Jimmy Work, 94, American country singer-songwriter ("Making Believe").
- Notable Indonesians killed in the Sunda Strait tsunami:
  - Aa Jimmy, 35, actor and comedian.
  - Dylan Sahara, 25, actress and presenter.
  - Herman Sikumbang, 36, guitarist (Seventeen).

=== 23 ===
- Alfred Bader, 94, Austrian-born Canadian chemist and businessman.
- Eileen Battersby, 60, American-born Irish literary critic (The Irish Times), traffic collision.
- Nana Chudasama, 86, Indian jurist and public servant.
- Hille Darjes, 75, German actress.
- Barbara Kloka Hackett, 90, American judge, U.S. District Court Judge for the Eastern District of Michigan (1986–2000).
- Troels Kløvedal, 75, Danish writer.
- Tonko Lonza, 88, Croatian actor.
- John Marshall, 60, Australian jockey, cancer.
- Bob Mattick, 85, American basketball player.
- Sophie Oluwole, 83, Nigerian philosopher.
- Liza Redfield, 94, American conductor and pianist.
- Don Richardson, 83, Canadian Christian missionary.
- Elias M. Stein, 87, American mathematician.

=== 24 ===
- Jozef Adamec, 76, Slovak football player (FC Spartak Trnava, national team) and manager (Inter Bratislava).
- Guy Bacon, 82, Canadian politician.
- Osvaldo Bayer, 91, Argentine writer (La Patagonia rebelde) and journalist.
- Denby Deegan, 77, American architect.
- R. Scott Frey, 67, American sociologist.
- Cynthia Ross Friedman, 47, Canadian biologist, aortic dissection.
- Felipe Gómez Alonzo, 8, Guatemalan migrant child in US custody.
- Jeane Porter Hester, 89, American physician.
- Patrice Martinez, 55, American actress (Three Amigos, The New Zorro, Beetlejuice).
- Rosario Mazzola, 94, Italian Roman Catholic prelate, Bishop of Cefalù (1988–2000).
- Dwijen Mukhopadhyay, 91, Indian composer and singer.
- Jai Narain Prasad Nishad, 88, Indian politician.
- Nancy B. Olson, 82, American librarian and educator.
- Stanko Poklepović, 80, Croatian football player and manager (Hajduk Split, Persepolis, national team), kidney failure.
- Jerry Riopelle, 77, American musician (The Parade), cancer.
- Dionne Rose-Henley, 49, Jamaican Olympic athlete (1992, 1996), cancer.
- Dick See, 83, Australian rugby player.
- Nirupam Sen, 72, Indian politician.
- Mahmoud Hashemi Shahroudi, 70, Iranian cleric and politician, Chairman of the Expediency Discernment Council (since 2017), Chief Justice (1999–2009), cancer.
- William C. Thompson, 94, American judge and politician, member of the New York State Senate (1965–1968).
- Jaime Torres, 80, Argentine charango player.
- James Calvin Wilsey, 61, American musician (Avengers).
- Notable Mexican politicians killed in the Puebla helicopter crash:
  - Martha Érika Alonso, 45, Governor of Puebla (2018).
  - Rafael Moreno Valle Rosas, 50, Senator (2006–2010), Governor of Puebla (2011–2017).

=== 25 ===
- Bill Baillie, 84, New Zealand Olympic runner (1964).
- Werner Braun, 100, Israeli photojournalist.
- John Briggs, 84, American baseball player (Chicago Cubs, Cleveland Indians).
- Nirendranath Chakravarty, 94, Indian poet and writer, creator of Bhaduri Moshai, heart attack.
- Walter Chilsen, 95, American politician, member of the Wisconsin Senate (1967–1990).
- Noel Derrick, 92, Australian Olympic ice hockey player.
- Larry Eisenberg, 99, American biomedical engineer and science fiction writer, acute myeloid leukemia.
- Álex Figueroa, 57, Chilean politician and physician, Minister of Health (1996–2000), liver cancer.
- István Levente Garai, 63, Hungarian physician and politician, MP (1994–1998, 2004–2014).
- William Harbison, 96, British Royal Air Force fighter pilot during World War II.
- Thomas Hayden, 92, Irish Olympic weightlifter (1960).
- Yoshitada Konoike, 78, Japanese politician, MP (1986–1993, since 1995).
- Law Hieng Ding, 83, Malaysian politician, Minister of Science, Technology and Environment (1990–2004), MP (1982–2008).
- Conrad Leslie, 95, American businessman and crop forecaster.
- Isaac Levi, 88, American philosopher.
- Michael Maclear, 89, British-Canadian journalist and documentarist.
- Sulagitti Narasamma, 98, Indian midwife, lung disease.
- Chester Nelsen Jr., 96, American Olympic cyclist (1948).
- Grazia Nidasio, 87, Italian comic artist and illustrator.
- Vicente Pimentel Jr., 72, Filipino politician, Governor of Surigao del Sur (2001–2010, 2016–2018).
- Baldur Ragnarsson, 88, Icelandic writer.
- Nancy Roman, 93, American astronomer (NASA), early developer of the Hubble Space Telescope.
- Sigi Schmid, 65, German-American Hall of Fame soccer coach (LA Galaxy, Columbus Crew, Seattle Sounders FC), heart attack.
- Syed Ali Raza Abidi, 46, Pakistani politician, MNA (2013–2018), shot.
- Sandy Talbot, 69, Australian rules footballer (Essendon).
- Rosalyn Terborg-Penn, 77, American historian and author.
- Terence Wheeler, 82, British novelist and playwright.

=== 26 ===
- Theodore Antoniou, 83, Greek composer and conductor, complications from Alzheimer's disease.
- Wendy Beckett, 88, British nun and art historian.
- Gerson Camata, 77, Brazilian politician, Governor of Espírito Santo (1983–1986), shot.
- Fabio Carpi, 93, Italian film director (Necessary Love) and novelist, Bagutta Prize (1998).
- Penny Cook, 61, Australian actress (A Country Practice, E Street, Neighbours), cancer.
- Constantin Corduneanu, 90, Romanian-born American mathematician.
- John Culver, 86, American politician, member of the U.S. Senate (1975–1981) and House of Representatives (1965–1975).
- Richard Curwin, 74, American educational theorist.
- John Dizikes, 86, American historian.
- Haldane Duncan, 78, Scottish television producer and director (Take the High Road, Taggart, Emmerdale).
- Herb Ellis, 97, American actor (Dragnet, The Killing, The Fortune Cookie).
- Maeng Yu-na, 29, South Korean singer, heart attack.
- Roy J. Glauber, 93, American physicist, Nobel Prize laureate (2005).
- Jorge Grau, 88, Spanish artist and filmmaker (Let Sleeping Corpses Lie).
- Sir Hew Hamilton-Dalrymple, 92, British aristocrat and military officer.
- Guillermo Hincapié Orozco, 92, Colombian politician, Mayor of Medellín (1977–1978).
- Al Hinkle, 92, American train conductor and Beat Generation figure.
- Tomokatsu Kitagawa, 67, Japanese politician, MP (2003–2009, since 2012).
- Pete Lovrich, 76, American baseball player (Kansas City Athletics).
- Don McKay, 93, American actor (West Side Story).
- Mike Metcalf, 79, English footballer (Wrexham, Chester City).
- Sono Osato, 99, American dancer and actress.
- Lawrence Roberts, 81, American computer scientist.
- Ronil Singh, 33, Fijian-born American police officer, shot.
- Morton Sobell, 101, American engineer and convicted Soviet spy.
- Margaret Stones, 98, Australian botanical illustrator.
- Sir Peter Swinnerton-Dyer, 91, British mathematician.
- Kary Vincent, 49, American football player.
- Elizabeth Zachariadou, 87, Greek historian.

=== 27 ===
- Juan Bautista Agüero, 83, Paraguayan footballer (Sevilla, Real Madrid, national team).
- Frank Blaichman, 96, Polish resistance member during World War II.
- Chris Burrous, 43, American news anchor (KTLA), accidental drug overdose.
- Albert Burstein, 96, American politician.
- Joe Camacho, 90, American baseball coach (Texas Rangers).
- Jim Davis, 77, American basketball player (Atlanta Hawks, Houston Rockets, Detroit Pistons), cancer.
- Mãe Stella de Oxóssi, 93, Brazilian ialorixá and writer, stroke.
- Giorgio Degola, 95, Italian politician, Senator (1976–1987).
- Jean Dumontier, 83, Canadian architect, cancer.
- Brian Jordan, 86, English footballer (Rotherham United, York City).
- Robert Kerman, 71, American actor (Debbie Does Dallas, Cannibal Holocaust, Cannibal Ferox).
- Miúcha, 81, Brazilian singer and composer, respiratory failure.
- Cheenu Mohan, 62, Indian actor, heart attack.
- Richard Arvin Overton, 112, American supercentenarian, nation's oldest living World War II veteran, complications from pneumonia.
- Richard F. Palmer, 88, American politician.
- Tadeusz Pieronek, 84, Polish Roman Catholic prelate, Auxiliary Bishop of Sosnowiec (1992–1998) and Rector of Pontifical Academy of Theology (1998–2004).
- Sir Fenton Ramsahoye, 89, Guyanese politician, Attorney General (1961–1964), MP (1961–1973).
- Børge Ring, 97, Danish animator (Anna & Bella, Heavy Metal, We're Back! A Dinosaur's Story), Oscar winner (1985).
- Wilfred Shuchat, 98, Canadian scholar and rabbi.
- Bumper Tormohlen, 81, American basketball player (Atlanta Hawks).
- Warren Wells, 76, American football player (Detroit Lions, Oakland Raiders), heart failure.

=== 28 ===
- Thea Nerissa Barnes, 66, American dancer and choreographer.
- William Belanger, 90, American politician.
- Abdelmalek Benhabyles, 97, Algerian politician, acting President (1992).
- Adelio Cogliati, 70, Italian lyricist ("Cose della vita", "Più bella cosa", "Adesso tu").
- Iaia Fiastri, 84, Italian screenwriter (Basta guardarla, Bread and Chocolate, When Women Lost Their Tails).
- Elisa Frota Pessoa, 97, Brazilian experimental physicist, pneumonia.
- Toshiko Fujita, 68, Japanese voice actress (Digimon Adventure, Fist of the North Star), breast cancer.
- Santiago García Aracil, 78, Spanish Roman Catholic prelate, Bishop of Jaén (1988–2004) and Archbishop of Mérida-Badajoz (2004–2015).
- Al Hawkes, 88, American bluegrass musician.
- Peter Hill-Wood, 82, British businessman and football executive (Arsenal).
- Seydou Badian Kouyaté, 90, Malian writer and politician, lyricist of national anthem "Le Mali".
- Frank L. Lambert, 100, American chemist.
- Georges Loinger, 108, French resistance fighter.
- Edgar Maalouf, 83, Lebanese military officer and politician, MP (2005–2013).
- Christine McGuire, 92, American singer (McGuire Sisters).
- Attila Miklósházy, 87, Hungarian-born Canadian Roman Catholic prelate, Bishop of the Hungarian Emigrants (1989–2006).
- Robert Edward Mulvee, 88, American Roman Catholic prelate, Bishop of Providence (1997–2005) and Wilmington (1985–1995).
- Amos Oz, 79, Israeli author (My Michael, A Perfect Peace, A Tale of Love and Darkness) and journalist, cancer.
- Bre Payton, 26, American conservative writer (The Federalist), complications from meningitis and swine flu.
- Greg Poole, 58, British wildlife artist, heart attack.
- Shehu Shagari, 93, Nigerian politician, President (1979–1983).
- Colleen Smith, 93, American baseball player (Grand Rapids Chicks).
- Tom Weisner, 69, American politician, mayor of Aurora, Illinois (2005–2016), cancer.
- Paul Wheelahan, 88, Australian comic book writer and artist.
- Oliver Wright, 71, Jamaican Olympic boxer (1968, 1972), heart attack.
- Yevgeni Zimin, 71, Russian Hall of Fame ice hockey player, Olympic champion (1968, 1972).

=== 29 ===
- Bill Brundige, 70, American football player (Washington Redskins).
- David Cavanagh, British music writer and journalist.
- Scott Doran, 44, Irish Gaelic footballer.
- Agneta Eckemyr, 68, Swedish actress (The Kentucky Fried Movie, The Island at the Top of the World, Christopher's House), complications from Alzheimer's disease.
- Brian Garfield, 79, American author (Death Wish, Hopscotch, Death Sentence), Parkinson's disease.
- Yehoshua Glazer, 91, Israeli footballer (Maccabi Tel Aviv, national team).
- Kellye Gray, 64, American jazz singer, breast cancer.
- Nina R. Harper, 68, American politician.
- Judith Rich Harris, 80, American psychology researcher and author (The Nurture Assumption).
- Syed Jahangir, 83, Bangladeshi painter.
- James Johnson Kelly, 90, American army major.
- Ringo Lam, 63, Hong Kong film director (Aces Go Places IV, City on Fire, Maximum Risk), heart attack.
- Liang Weiyan, 89, Chinese electrical engineer, member of the Chinese Academy of Engineering.
- Ling Te-Sheng, 90, Taiwanese Olympic athlete.
- Rosenda Monteros, 83, Mexican actress (A Woman's Devotion, The Magnificent Seven, Tiara Tahiti).
- Aldo Parisot, 100, Brazilian-born American cellist.
- Maria Isaura Pereira de Queiróz, 100, Brazilian sociologist.
- Robert H. Renken, 97, American politician.
- Carlos Sánchez, 83, Colombian actor (Juan Valdez).
- Jim Shreve, 92, American sports coach.
- Roy Skeggs, 84, British film producer.
- Rita Smith-Wade-El, 70, American psychologist and academic, triple-negative breast cancer.
- Ted Urness, 81, Canadian football player (Saskatchewan Roughriders).
- Bill Watson, 87, Australian Test cricketer.
- Dame June Whitfield, 93, English actress (Terry and June, Last of the Summer Wine, Absolutely Fabulous).

=== 30 ===
- Cameron M. Alexander, 86, American Baptist minister.
- Harry Atkinson, 89, New Zealand-British physicist.
- Larry Austin, 88, American composer.
- James Black, 62, American football player (Kansas City Chiefs), heart failure.
- Seymour S. Cohen, 101, American biochemist.
- Karel Engel, 78, Czech Olympic wrestler (1972).
- Pepita Ferrari, 66, Canadian documentary film director.
- Mera J. Flaumenhaft, 73, American academic and translator.
- Claude Gingras, 87, Canadian journalist and music critic (La Presse).
- Marc Hauser, 66, American photographer.
- Dick Helling, 68, Dutch footballer (Ajax, SC Telstar, FC Volendam).
- Edgar Hilsenrath, 92, German writer (The Nazi and the Barber, The Story of the Last Thought), complications from pneumonia.
- Jack Kahl, 78, American businessman.
- Joan Kaufman, 83, American baseball player (All-American Girls Professional Baseball League).
- Don Lusk, 105, American animator and director (Pinocchio, 101 Dalmatians, Peanuts).
- Esther Morrison, 87, American baseball player (Springfield Sallies).
- Warren Plunkett, 98, American football player (Cleveland Rams), complications from pneumonia.
- Ron Reiffel, 86, Australian footballer (Richmond).
- Anthony Revell, 83, British Royal Navy medical officer, Surgeon-General of the British Armed Services (1994–1997), cancer.
- Ambrose Schindler, 101, American football player and actor (The Wizard of Oz).
- Mrinal Sen, 95, Indian film director (Bhuvan Shome, Mrigayaa, Khandhar), heart attack.
- Calvin Stamp, 60, Jamaican Olympic weightlifter.
- Héctor Timerman, 65, Argentine journalist and politician, Minister of Foreign Affairs (2010–2015), liver cancer.
- Blandine Verlet, 76, French harpsichordist.
- Islwyn Watkins, 80, Welsh artist.

=== 31 ===
- Maya Casabianca, 77, French-Israeli singer.
- Adrienne Cullen, 58, Irish journalist and healthcare campaigner, cervical cancer.
- Dean Ford, 72, Scottish singer (Marmalade) and songwriter ("Reflections of My Life", "I See the Rain").
- Herschel Forester, 87, American football player (Cleveland Browns).
- Etty Fraser, 87, Brazilian actress (Beto Rockfeller, Durval Discos, Cristina Wants to Get Married), heart failure.
- Urbie Green, 92, American jazz trombonist.
- Kató Havas, 98, Hungarian classical violinist and teacher.
- Keylla Hernández, 45, Puerto Rican journalist (WAPA), liver cancer.
- Kobi Kambon, 75, American psychologist.
- Kader Khan, 81, Afghan-born Indian-Canadian actor (Daag, Family: Ties of Blood, Tevar) and screenwriter, complications from progressive supranuclear palsy.
- Mark Killilea Jnr, 79, Irish politician, MEP (1987–1999), TD (1977–1982).
- Elazar Mordechai Koenig, 73, Israeli Orthodox rabbi.
- Nicola L, 81, French-Moroccan multidisciplinary artist.
- Loknath, 91, Indian actor (Bangaarada Manushya).
- Warren MacKenzie, 94, American potter.
- Richard Marks, 75, American film editor (Apocalypse Now, The Godfather Part II, Broadcast News).
- Christian Mohn, 92, Norwegian ski jumper and sports official, president of the Norwegian Ski Federation (1978–1980).
- Nils Oskar Nilsson, 83, Swedish politician, Riksdagen (2006–2010).
- Gennaro Papa, 93, Italian politician, Deputy (1961–1963, 1968–1976).
- Al Reinert, 71, American screenwriter (Apollo 13, Final Fantasy: The Spirits Within) and documentarian (For All Mankind), cancer.
- Simon Britto Rodrigues, 64, Indian politician, MLA (2006–2011), heart attack.
- Ray Sawyer, 81, American singer (Dr. Hook & the Medicine Show).
- Eric L. Schwartz, 71, American neuroscientist.
- István Seregély, 87, Hungarian Roman Catholic prelate, Archbishop of Eger (1987–2007).
- Antônio Salvador Sucar, 79, Brazilian basketball player, world champion (1963) and Olympic bronze medalist (1960, 1964).
- Gülriz Sururi, 89, Turkish actress and author.
- Peter Thompson, 76, English footballer (Liverpool, Bolton Wanderers, national team).
