= Niedermann =

Niederman or Niedermann is a surname. Notable people with the surname include:

- Derrick Niederman, American author, mathematician, and game designer
- James Corson Niederman (1924–2024), American epidemiologist
- J. C. U. Niedermann (1810–?), American politician
- Marie Niedermann (1880–1967), Danish film actress
- Paul Niedermann (1927–2018), German-Jewish journalist
