= Kortrijk-Roeselare-Tielt (Flemish Parliament constituency) =

Belgian political subdivision

Kortrijk-Roeselare-Tielt was a constituency used to elect members of the Flemish Parliament between 1995 and 2003.

== Representatives ==
Election	MFP (Party)	MFP (Party)	MFP (Party)	MFP (Party)	MFP (Party)	MFP (Party)	MFP (Party)	MFP (Party)	MFP (Party)
1995	Herman De Reuse (VB)	Louis Bril (VLD)	Jacques Laverge (VLD)	Carl Decaluwé (CVP)	Peter Desmet (CVP)	Marc Olivier (CVP)	Chris Vandenbroeke (VU)	Patrick Hostekint (PS)	Gilbert Bossuyt (PS)
1999	Herman De Reuse (VB)	Louis Bril (VLD)	Karlos Callens (VLD)	Carl Decaluwé (CVP)	Gisèle Gardeyn-Debever (CVP)	Luc Martens (CVP)	Chris Vandenbroeke (VU)	Patrick Hostekint (PS)	Carlo Daelman (PS)
