= Taminiaux =

Taminiaux is a surname. Notable people with the surname include:

- Jacques Taminiaux (1928–2019), Belgian philosopher and professor
- Lionel Taminiaux (born 1996), Belgian road cyclist
- Willy Taminiaux (1939–2018), Belgian politician and mayor
