= Chegato High School =

School in Zimbabwe

Coordinates: 20.837°S 29.949°E

- Zimbabwe

Information
- Type: High school
- Established: 1957; 69 years ago

Chegato High School is a private mixed sex education (coeducational) school governed by the Evangelical Lutheran Church in Zimbabwe (ELC-Z) and is located some 112 km south of Zvishavane in Midlands. It is situated in rural Mberengwa in Chief Mposi's area and it became the first secondary school in the district to offer Form IV in 1966 and Form VI in 1986. The school is known for its excellent academic achievements with one of the students achieving the best Rhodesian Junior Certificate (RJC) results in the whole country in 1961, a record that was repeated in 1987 when Osborn Vhevha became the best student nationally in the Cambridge 'O' Level examinations.

== History ==
Chegato High School was founded in 1957 as Chegato Secondary School. The idea and discussions of a secondary school in Belingwe (now Mberengwa), however, began much earlier than 1957. In 1953, the Rhodesian Department of African Education (as it was then called) advised and encouraged the Church of Sweden Mission (CSM) to start secondary school education. The first Form I class opened at Musume in January 1954 where it shared facilities with the Primary Teachers' Lower (PTL) Training School and both schools were under the headship of Mr A Engdahl. The Mission Council (the Church of Sweden Mission decision making body) decided to move the secondary school to Mnene in 1955 with Mr Nordesjo as the principal of the whole school establishment. Mr Enoch Dumbutshena who later became Zimbabwe's Chief Justice was one of the staff members. The mission authorities decided that the secondary school should be permanently placed in the new buildings at Chegato Mission which at that time consisted of a chapel, the evangelist and pastor's houses and a primary day school nearby. Initial funding for the secondary school came from the Rhodesian government to the tune of 7 500 pounds. Mr S. Fredricksson, the mission builder was given the task of drawing plans and erecting the buildings. Government assistance was not available when structures for Forms III and IV were erected. The Church Council which superseded the old Mission Council guaranteed 5000 pounds for the new buildings and this money was eventually received from SIDA. The money was used to build a laboratory, a large library, a dining hall, assembly hall and several staff houses.

In February 1957, a ceremony attended by Dean A. H Albrekson, Chief Mposi, local guests particularly the nearby Lemba Masarira clan, staff and the Director of Education from Salisbury (now Harare) Mr Finkle, was held to officially open Chegato Secondary School, which during the same year had taken up permanent residence in the new buildings. Forms I and II then consisted of 72 students of which 18 were girls. In 1961 Chegato Secondary School was connected to the national telephone network and the following year it was connected to the national electricity grid owing to, among other advantages, the discovery of emeralds at the nearby Sandawana mines and also the strategic location of Jeka Clinic which happened to lie along the same route of access. In 1965 the first 20 students were admitted into the much longed for Form III and the following year the pioneering Form IV students sat for their Cambridge School Certificate.

Mr T. Bergman was the principal of Chegato Secondary School between 1957 and 1966, although after every five years he went on furlough back to Sweden leaving a stand in - (1958: Mr Engdahl, 1964: Mr O. L Mlilo). Bergman resigned in 1966 to take up a new position as the Evangelical Lutheran Church-Rhodesia (ELC-R) Education Secretary and was replaced by Mr H. E Perrson who had arrived from Sweden in September 1965. During this period the school employed and/or enrolled some African teachers and students who became important luminaries in post-independence Zimbabwe - Zephania Matchaba Hove, Jeffias Ngwenya, Phineas Makhurane, Byron Hove, Eleck Mashingaidze and several others. Mr E Chenyika Hove took over as headmaster of Chegato Secondary School between 1969 and 1980 and took the school into exile in Bulawayo (1979-1980) when Zimbabwe's liberation war intensified.

Mr I. M Shumba took over as headmaster between 1981 and 2000 when he resigned from the post to join politics. During this period Mr Shumba modernised the school by successfully mobilising funds to build several new hostels, a new complex housing biology, physics and chemistry laboratories, a lecture theatre and several staff houses. Most of these structures were erected by the new school builder Mr Chikomo Musvaburi and his contract workers. Mr Shumba left Mr T. Hove as acting headmaster in 1986 when he took study leave. Rev R.P Tangawamira was the headmaster between 2000 and 2014 and brought back Chegato High School into the fold of top 100 high schools in Zimbabwe, a phenomenal rise after the disastrous effects of the Zimbabwean crisis that slowed down from 2008. At the end of Mr Bergman's tenure as headmaster in 1966, the school had 6 classes with almost 200 students and 9 teachers. As of 2010 Chegato High School has slightly over 700 students and about 35 teachers. When Rev R. P Tangawamira retired Morris Ngara took over as the new principal and has begun work on landscaping the grounds of the school.

== Notable alumni ==
=== Politics ===
- Joram Gumbo, Honourable Isaiah Masvayamwando Shumba
- Dr. Byron Hove, Honourable Costain Muguti

=== Military ===
- Dunn Mabika Hove
