= Dunn Mabika Hove =

Dunn Mabika Hove (July 14, 1959 - February 27, 2007), also known as Paris Checherere, was a Zimbabwean military intelligence officer who was one of the leaders of ZANLA, Robert Mugabe's guerrilla forces during the Rhodesian Bush War. A career soldier, in post-independence Zimbabwe, he went on to have a successful career in the Zimbabwe National Army, serving with distinction in UN and AU led peace keeping missions across Africa.

== Personal life ==
He was born in 1959 in Mberengwa district of the Midlands Province. Colonel Mabika Hove was educated up to Form 4 at Chegato High School in Mberengwa together with the likes of Major General Trust Mugoba Chief-of-Staff (Administration) and Quartermaster of the Zimbabwe National Army. Other school mates include Misheck Zhou, Runesu Tofa, Phineas Makhurane, the late politician Byron Hove, Eleck Mashingaidze and the late MDC Secretary for Economic Affairs, Industry and Commerce Dr. Mfandaidza Hove.

== Rhodesian Bush War/Second Chimurenga ==
He joined the Rhodesian Bush War/Second Chimurenga in 1976 and was trained in Mozambique at as a ZANLA militant. It was during training in Mozambique that he adopted the war name of Paris Checherere. After joining the front as a medical officer, he rose through the ranks to become a detachment commander in the Gaza province which was led by General Constantine Chiwenga (who was first Commissar then Provincial Commander), the current commander of the Zimbabwe Defence Forces and Retired Brigadier General (former Judge Advocate General) George Chiweshe (who was the Provincial Commissar), former Judge President of the High Court of Zimbabwe and current Judge of the Supreme Court of Zimbabwe. Other operational commanders in Gaza provinces include the late liberation hero Brigadier General Charles Tigwe Gumbo.

During the Rhodesian Bush War, Checherere was heavily involved in moving recruits from Rhodesia into ZANLA's rear bases in Mozambique. For example, according to testimony recorded in the SADC Hashim Mbita Project, in early 1976 Checherere led a group of recruits across the border into Mozambique and liaised with FRELIMO forces after their arrival. At Mapai, which served as a reception point for recruits entering Mozambique, he arranged for the group to be received by FRELIMO and transferred onward through the liberation movement's camp network. The recruits were subsequently moved from Mapai to Doroi, while Checherere was expected to proceed to Chimoio to report to senior ZANLA command. His documented role illustrates the operational links between ZANLA cadres, FRELIMO and the network that received and transferred Zimbabwean recruits arriving in Mozambique during the expansion of the armed struggle in 1976.

In 1977, as a senior medical officer, Cde Paris supported the late Brigadier General Dr Felix Muchemwa, Dr Herbert Ushewokunze and Dr Sydney Sekeramayi who were the doctors in charge at Chimoio camp. As recalled by the late Brig General Dr Muchemwa, Parirenyatwa Camp hospital was the medical centre for Chimoio. Cde Muchemwa with assistance from Cde Paris and others carried out surgical procedures in a mobile ambulance theatre. On morning of the Chimoio attack, Dr Muchemwa recalls, "Our mobile ambulance theatre was being manned by Cde Paris who I had asked to go and collect some diesel while I took a bath. As I started bathing, this was around 7:30am, I just heard a cracking sound...... As I was trying to put on my clothes, I saw a huge crowd of comrades pouring out from the base running towards nearby bushes. One of the comrades who had already passed me came back and said Cde Muchemwa manyai, manyai. I asked him what was wrong and he said hondo, hondo. I asked him what hondo?". The ambush which the Rhodesian forces called operation Dingo resulted in more than 3,000 ZANLA deaths and 5,000 guerillas were wounded while only two government troops died and six were wounded.

By the end of 1978 there were about 11,000 ZANLA troops operating in Rhodesia and over half of these had been deployed through Mocambique's Gaza Province into the South East area of Rhodesia known as 'The Russian Front.'

From 1977, ZANLA’s Gaza Province became one of the most active southern theatres of the liberation war, expanding from the Chiredzi–Mwenezi axis into Mberengwa, Chivi, Zvishavane, Shurugwi and southwards towards Beitbridge and Matabeleland South. ZANLA units combined political mobilisation with increasingly ambitious military operations: Willie Deveteve was deployed with military engineers in 1977 to sabotage strategic communications, including the Rutenga–Beitbridge and Somabula–Rutenga railway lines, roads and bridges linking Rhodesia to South Africa, while guerrilla formations, moved into Mberengwa and Chivi fighting Rhodesian forces in pitched engagements and making extensive use of landmines. Paris Checherere operated within this expanding front. By 1978 Gaza had been reinforced by about 200 FRELIMO soldiers, some of whom penetrated as far as Mberengwa, Zvishavane, Shurugwi, Buchwa and Berejena, and on 9 April 1978 ZANLA forces mounted a major attack at Mataga, employing mortars, recoilless rifles, RPG-7s and machine guns under commanders including Paris Checherere, Freddie Matanga, Willie Deveteve, Watson Juru and others. By 1979 the guerrillas were also attempting to undermine the Rhodesia–Zimbabwe elections; in Chivi, for example, civilians were instructed to boycott rallies and voting, and by May the district was reported to be largely in ZANLA hands. Following the Lancaster House ceasefire of 21 December 1979, Gaza fighters began moving into designated rendezvous and assembly points, including Chasu and others, ahead of the elections and Zimbabwe’s independence in April 1980.

At the end of the Second Chimurenga or Rhodesian bush war, Paris Chererere joined many other ZANLA and ZAPU fighters at assembly points, ready to start life in a new Zimbabwe Career in the Zimbabwe military

== Integration ==
In 1981 Paris Checherere was attested to the newly formed Zimbabwe National Army in the Corps of Intelligence. Following majority rule in April 1980 and the cantonment of the ZANLA and ZIPRA under Operation Agila, Lt General Solomon Mujuru with assistance from British Army trainers (the British Military Advisory and Training Team, BMATT) oversaw the integration of guerrilla fighters into one unified army.

== Peacekeeping ==
Col Mabika Hove was not a controversial military figure. This is partly why he was greatly admired by many in the Corps of Intelligence and the ZNA in general. Current commander of Zimbabwe National Army Lt. General Philip Valerio Sibanda characterised him as an intelligent, calm, firm but compassionate leader. He was especially known for being a diplomat par excellence and was involved in most of the Zimbabwe National Army's foreign peace keeping missions. Some of these include;

- Angolan Civil War; 1991-1995 United Nations Angola Verification Mission II (UNAVEM II)
- Mozambican Civil War; 1992-1994 United Nations Operation in Mozambique (ONUMOZ)
- Somali Civil War; 1992-1993 United Nations Operation in Somalia I (UNOSOM I)
- Somali Civil War; 1993-1995 United Nations Operation in Somalia II (UNOSOM II)
- Democratic Republic of the Congo - Operation Sovereign Legitimacy.

In 1998, then Maj. Mabika Hove was one of the advisors sent by Robert Mugabe to assist President Laurent Kabila as the Second Congo War, also known as Coltan War, or the Great War of Africa gained momentum. His main function was to strengthen the allied forces’ (Zambia, Chad, Sudan, Angola and Zimbabwe) intelligence capacity and he was dubbed “Chief Spy.” The war was not only the largest war in modern African history, but it was the deadliest conflict worldwide since World War II killing more than 5.4 million people. Then Lt. Col. Mabika Hove was especially instrumental in the effort to establish stability in the aftermath of the assassination of Laurent-Désiré Kabila on 16 January 2001.

== Later years ==
He later returned home when the war officially ended in July 2003 to head the Zimbabwe's National Army's main School of Military Intelligence at Kabrit in Harare. He was later appointed director of the Ministry of Defence's Mapping and Research division (intelligence) and was subsequently seconded to the Ministry of Lands to provide security sector oversight on the land reform programme.

== Death ==
Dunn Mabika Hove ‘‘Paris Checherere’’ died in the early hours of the morning of February 27, 2007 aged 47. He had throughout his military career, particularly the DRC war developed a number of ailments including diabetes and heart disease. He died in a diabetic coma in a private clinic in Craneborne, Harare. He was declared a Liberation War Hero and was buried at the heroes’ acre in Harare. He is survived by his wife, Grace and three children, Fidelis, Tinashe and Tsitsi.

== National Awards ==
Despite passing on at a relatively young age, the late commander was awarded the following accolades over his liberation and civil service career:

1. Liberation Medal
2. Independence Medal
3. Long and Exemplary Service Medal
4. Mozambique Campaign Medal
5. DRC Campaign Medal (awarded for service during the Second Congo War)
6. Several UN peacekeeping campaign medals.
