= American Indian Council of Architects and Engineers =

Professional association of Native Americans

The American Indian Council of Architects and Engineers (AICAE) is a non-profit organization that promotes the development of American Indian professionals in the fields of architecture and engineering. The AICAE encourages the training, licensure and continuing education of American Indians in these professions. As of 2020, the council has over 200 members from over 20 states in the United States. The AICAE publishes a newsletter, directory, and holds conferences semiannually.

The AICAE was founded on June 23, 1975 by a small group of American Indian professionals in Albuquerque, New Mexico. Co-founders included Louis L. Weller, a Caddo/Cherokee architect from Shiprock, New Mexico, Neal A. McCaleb, a Chickasaw engineer from Oklahoma, Denby Deegan of the Mandan, Hidatsa and Arikara Nation, and Leon W. Shirley of the Navajo Nation. Other original group founders included Charles Archumbault, Ernest Echohawk, Denis Numkena, Leroy Brown and Wakon Redbird.

Members of the AICAE provide a full range of architectural and engineering services to a range of clients including tribes and Alaska Natives, federal agencies, state agencies and local governments.

There is an annual conference held most recently in September 2019 in Albuquerque, New Mexico.

== Publications ==
- Hill, Richard (1991). Indian Housing Design Guide. American Indian Council of Architects and Engineers.
- AICAE (1994). Our Home: A Design Guide for Indian Housing. Washington DC: National Endowment for the Arts, Design Arts Program. OCLC 29571902.

== See also ==
- American Indian Science and Engineering Society

== Sources ==
- Ballast, David Kent (1998). The Encyclopedia of Associations and Information Sources for Architects, Designers, and Engineers. M.E. Sharpe. ISBN 978-0765618436.
- Hoffman, Elizabeth DeLaney, ed. (2012). American Indians and Popular Culture: Media, sports, and politics. ABC-CLIO. ISBN 978-0313379901.
- Velarde Tiller, Veronica E. (2015). Tiller's Guide to Indian Country : Economic Profiles of American Indian Reservations (Third ed.). Albuquerque, New Mexico: BowArrow Publishing Company. p. 606.
