= Elisa Frota Pessoa =

Brazilian physicist (1921–2018)

- Born: Elisa Esther Habbema de Maia; 17 January 1921; Rio de Janeiro
- Died: 28 December 2018 (aged 97); Rio de Janeiro
- Education: Federal University of Rio de Janeiro
- Spouse(s): Oswaldo Frota-Pessoa (1939–1951); Jayme Tiomno (1951–2011)
- Scientific career
- Fields: Radioactivity, mesons
- Workplaces: Centro Brasileiro de Pesquisas Físicas

Elisa Frota Pessoa (born Elisa Esther Habbema de Maia; 17 January 1921 – 28 December 2018) was a Brazilian experimental physicist. In 1942, she became one of the first women in Brazil to graduate with a degree in physics and was one of the founding members of the Centro Brasileiro de Pesquisas Físicas (Brazilian Center for Physical Research).

She was best known for her research on radioactivity using nuclear emulsions, as well as for her studies on the reactions and disintegrations of K and π mesons in nuclear emulsions, and the reactions of protons and deuterons with nuclei of intermediate mass.

== Early life ==
Pessoa was born in Rio de Janeiro, Brazil. Her parents were Juvenal Moreira Maia and Elisa Habbema de Maia. She developed an interest in science in 1935 during her ginasial (middle school) years at Escola Paulo de Frontin. Her greatest influence was her physics teacher, Plinio Süssekind da Rocha, who closely followed her progress and guided her by assigning subjects beyond the standard curriculum.

At the end of high school, Pessoa expressed a desire to study engineering, despite her family's opposition. Her father, a conservative man, believed that marriage was the most suitable path for women. Nevertheless, she enrolled in the physics program at the Faculty of Philosophy of the University of Brazil (now the Federal University of Rio de Janeiro), where she graduated in 1942.

== Career ==
Together with Sonja Ashauer, who graduated the same year from the University of São Paulo, Pessoa was the second woman to earn a degree in physics in Brazil. She soon distinguished herself in her studies and, in her second year, was invited by professor Joaquim da Costa Ribeiro to serve as his assistant. She worked with Costa Ribeiro without pay until 1944, when she was formally hired by the university.

At the age of 18, she married her former teacher, the biologist Oswaldo Frota-Pessoa, with whom she had two children, Sonia and Roberto. In 1951, the couple separated, and Pessoa began living with the physicist Jayme Tiomno.

Along with Tiomno and other physicists of her generation, including José Leite Lopes, César Lattes, and Mário Schenberg, Pessoa contributed to the advancement of scientific research in Brazil. She also faced gender-based prejudice and social stigma for being separated from her husband at a time when divorce was illegal in the country. In 1949, she was one of the founders of the Centro Brasileiro de Pesquisas Físicas (CBPF; Brazilian Center for Physical Research), where she served as Chief of the Nuclear Emulsions Division until 1964.

In 1950, she co-authored, with Neusa Margem, the first research article published by the new institution, titled "Sobre a desintegração do méson pesado positivo" ("On the Disintegration of the Positive Heavy Meson"). This study was the first to experimentally support the V–A theory of weak interactions. Another of her studies, published in 1969, resolved a long-standing debate over whether the π meson (pi meson) could have non-zero spin. Pessoa also collaborated with European researchers on the study of K mesons.

Pessoa moved to Brasília in 1965 to work at the University of Brasília. She later transferred to the University of São Paulo but was expelled in April 1969 under AI-5. Fleeing persecution during the Brazilian military dictatorship, she worked in Europe and the United States, where she contributed to the training of Brazilian physicists abroad.

In 1975, Pessoa began establishing an emulsion laboratory at the Pontifical Catholic University of São Paulo (PUC-SP) with the support of Ernst W. Hamburger from the Institute of Physics at the University of São Paulo (IFUSP). Two years later, in 1977, she joined the Experimental Physics Department at IFUSP while continuing her work at PUC-SP. In 1980, she returned to the CBPF, where she established a nuclear emulsion laboratory for nuclear spectroscopy. Even after her compulsory retirement in 1991, Pessoa remained an emeritus professor at the centre until 1995.

== Death ==
Pessoa died on 28 December 2018 in Rio de Janeiro.

At the time of her death, she was survived by five grandchildren—a biochemist, an art historian, an economist, an engineering student, and a high school graduate—and six great-grandchildren.

== Main works ==
- 1950 – Sobre a desintegração do méson pesado positivo. Anais da Academia Brasileira de Ciências, vol. 22, pp. 371–383 (with N. Margem).
- 1955 – A new radioactive method for marking mosquitoes and its application. Proceedings of the Geneva Conference on the Peaceful Applications of Atomic Energy, p. 140 (with N. Margem and M. B. Aragão).
- 1961 – On the observation of fast Σ-hyperons emitted from the interactions of K mesons with emulsion nuclei. Il Nuovo Cimento, Series 10, vol. 19, pp. 1077–1089 (with the European Collaboration Group).
- 1969 – Isotropy in π−μ decays. Physical Review, 177 (5), pp. 2368–2370.
- 1983 – States in 118Sn from 117Sn (d,p)118Sn at 12 MeV. Il Nuovo Cimento A, vol. 77, pp. 369–401.
- 1986 – States in 94Zr from 94Zr (d,d′)94Zr* at 15.5 MeV. Il Nuovo Cimento A, vol. 96, pp. 347–365 (with S. Joffily).
