= Sidy Lamine Niasse =

Senegalese lawyer and journalist

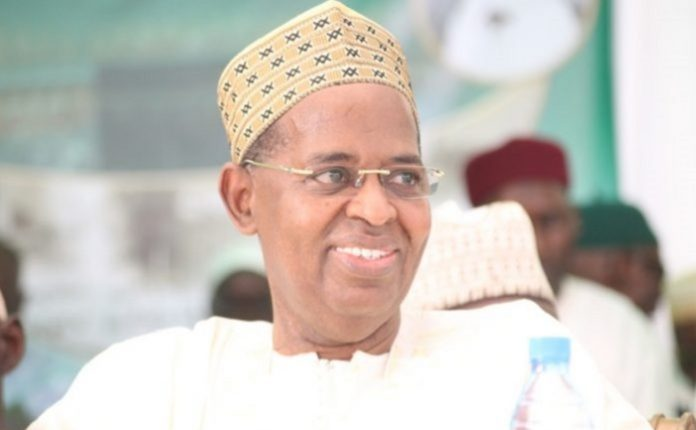
- Born: 15 August 1950; Kaolack, Senegal
- Died: 4 December 2018 (aged 68); Dakar, Senegal
- Occupations: Lawyer; Journalist

Sidy Lamine Niasse (15 August 1950 – 4 December 2018) was a Senegalese lawyer, teacher, journalist, and religious guide. He was the founder and CEO of the Senegalese press group WalFadjri.

== Biography ==
Sidy Lamine Niasse was born on 15 August 1950 in Kaolack, Senegal. He began his career teaching Arabic from 1971 to 1975. After this first teaching experience, he studied Islamic law at Al-Azhar University in Egypt. In the early 1980s, Niasse went back to Senegal and became focused on the revitalization of the Arabic language in a place where French reigned supreme.

Niasse took to the press to try and accomplish his goals. In January 1984, he created WalFadjri, a bi-monthly newspaper. Before long, the newspaper became daily. In 1997, he started an FM radio station (Walf Fm), TV channel (Walf Tv), and a website.

Sidy Lamine Niasse died on 4 December 2018.

== Essays ==
- Le système islamique : dimensions et perspectives
- Sharifou ou la fin de l’obscurantisme (1999)
- Un arabisant entre presse et pouvoir
- Arguments pertinents en réponse à ceux qui interdisent aux hommes de saluer les femmes de la main
- Abdoulaye Wade, un président par défaut
- L'étranger parmi les siens (2016)
