= Walter E. H. Cockle =

British papyrologist (1939–2018)

- Walter Cockle studying papyri at University College London, 1971.
- Born: 2 December 1939; Hendon, England
- Died: 6 December 2018 (aged 79)
- Known for: Work on the Oxyrhynchus Papyri; New edition of Euripides' Hypsipyle; Entries in The Oxford Classical Dictionary

Academic background
- Education: University of London
- Thesis: (1974)
- Doctoral advisor: Eric Turner; Giuseppe Giangrande

Academic work
- Discipline: Ancient history
- Sub-discipline: Papyrology
- Institutions: University College London

Walter Eric Harold Cockle FSA (2 December 1939 – 6 December 2018) was a historian of the ancient world at University College London. He specialised in papyrology and is particularly known for his work on the Oxyrhynchus Papyri and his many entries for The Oxford Classical Dictionary. He produced a new edition of Euripides' partly-lost tragedy Hypsipyle based on a meticulous re-examination of the surviving papyrus fragments and was elected a fellow of the Society of Antiquaries of London in 1987.

== Early life and family ==
Walter Cockle was born in Hendon, Middlesex, on 2 December 1939. He married Helen and they had a son, Christopher.

== Career ==
Cockle was a research fellow in Greek and Latin papyrology at University College London where he was particularly known for his work on the Oxyrhynchus Papyri. He featured in a film Greek Papyri produced by the college's UCOLFILM unit at the Slade School of Fine Art in 1971.

He completed his PhD in 1974 with a thesis on Euripides' tragedy Hypsipyle under the supervision of Eric Turner and Giuseppe Giangrande. Cockle meticulously re-examined the fragments discovered in the Oxyrhynchus Papyri (P.Oxy. VI 852) to produce a new edition of the work which had been considered almost completely lost until its rediscovery at Oxyrhynchus in 1908. His edition was published in Italy by Edizioni dell'Ateneo in 1987.

Cockle was elected a fellow of the Society of Antiquaries of London in 1987 and took part in seven seasons of excavations at the Roman quarry at Mons Claudianus in Egypt between 1987 and 1993.

He contributed to the third edition of The Oxford Classical Dictionary (1996) as "W.E.H.C." for which he wrote the entries on Antinoopolis, Coptus, Elephantine, Fayum, Hermopolis Magna, Leucos Limen, the Colossi of Memnon, Mons Claudianus, Myos Hormos, the Nile, Oasis, Ostraca, Oxyrhynchus, Ptolemais Hermiou, Ptolemais Theron, and Syene.

== Death and legacy ==
Cockle died on 6 December 2018. His funeral was at St Mary Magdalene church in Latimer, Buckinghamshire, where he was buried in the churchyard. In his appreciation of Cockle's life, professor Tommy Wasserman described him as one of the most erudite scholars he had ever met and wondered if anyone else had edited as many New Testament papyri as Cockle had?

== Selected publications ==
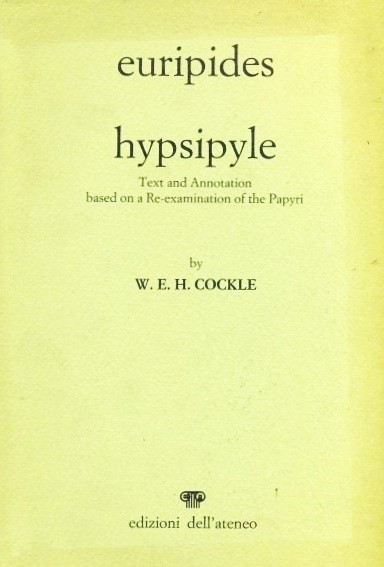
Cockle's edition of Euripides' Hypsipyle (1987)

- "A New Greek Glossary on Papyrus from Oxyrhynchus", Bulletin of the Institute of Classical Studies, No. 28 (1981), pp. 123–141.
- "Restoring and Conserving Papyri", Bulletin of the Institute of Classical Studies, No. 30 (1983), pp. 147–165.
- "State Archives in Graeco-Roman Egypt from 30 BC to the Reign of Septimius Severus", The Journal of Egyptian Archaeology, Vol. 70 (1984), pp. 106–122.
- Euripides Hypsipyle: Text and annotation based on a re-examination of the papyri. Rome: Edizioni dell'Ateneo, 1987. (editor)
- "The Papyrology of the Roman near East: A survey". Journal of Roman Studies, Vol. 85 (1995), pp. 214–235. (With H. M. Cotton & F. G. B. Millar)
