= Denby Deegan =

American architect

- Born: March 15, 1941; North Dakota
- Died: December 24, 2018 (aged 77)
- Other name: Surrounded by Enemy
- Education: Bismarck State College and North Dakota State University
- Occupation: Architect

Denby Deegan (1941 – 2018), also known as Surrounded by Enemy, was a notable Native American architect in the United States and a founding member of the American Indian Council of Architects and Engineers. Deegan was a member of the Three Affiliated Tribes, known as the Mandan, Hidatsa, and Arikara Nation, and his architectural and design work focused on themes and motifs from his culture and heritage.

== Early life ==
Deegan was born on March 15, 1941, to Pete and Dorothy (née Gillette) Deegan. He attended school at Nishu on the Fort Berthold Indian Reservation, then Marty Indian School in Marty, South Dakota, and high school in Garrison, North Dakota. He received an associate degree in engineering from Bismarck Junior College (later known as Bismarck State College). In 1965, he graduated from North Dakota State University with two degrees—a Bachelor of Science in Architectural Studies and a Bachelor of Architecture degree from the College of Architecture and Engineering. Deegan died on December 24, 2018.

== Career ==
Deegan practiced architecture as Denby Deegan Associates of Bismarck, North Dakota. He was a founding member of the American Indian Council of Architects and Engineers, serving as that organization's charter vice-chairman. Deegan's architectural, cultural, and design contributions include a variety of buildings for Native American communities and others, often employing symbolic forms and cultural imagery in his work.

Deegan contributed to a variety of notable architecture and design projects, including:

- Urban American Indian Center, Minneapolis MN (1972)
- Skills Center, United Tribes Technical College (1974)
- Oswego Community Center, Oswego, Mont. (1975)
- Cultural/Tourism Building, Poplar, Montana
- Four Winds School, Fort Totten (1983)
- Three Affiliated Tribes Arikara Cultural Center, White Shield, North Dakota (2008)
