= Marc Hauser (photographer) =

American photographer (1952–2018)

- Born: September 25, 1952
- Died: December 30, 2018 (aged 66); Chicago, Illinois, U.S.
- Occupation: Photographer

Marc Hauser (September 25, 1952 – December 30, 2018) was an American photographer from Chicago. He took photographs of celebrities like Woody Allen, John Belushi, Eric Clapton, Cindy Crawford, Mick Jagger, Michael Jordan, Sophia Loren, Oprah, Dolly Parton, and Dennis Rodman. He also took the picture for John Mellencamp's Scarecrow album cover.

== Early life ==
Hauser grew up in Wilmette and attended New Trier High School.
