= R. Scott Frey =

American sociologist (1951–2018)

R. Scott Frey (February 28, 1951 - December 24, 2018) was an American sociologist at the University of Tennessee. He specialized in the interrelated areas of public policy, environment, and social change and social development. His later work centered on risk and globalization issues.

== Publications ==
- R. Scott Frey. Forthcoming. 2005. Chapter in Globalization and the Environment, edited by Andrew Jorgenson and Ed Kick. Lei den, The Netherlands: Brill Academic Press.
- R. Scott Frey. Forthcoming. 2004. "Ecological Modernization and the Transfer of Hazards to the Periphery", Third World Quarterly.
- R. Scott Frey. 2003. "The Transfer of Core-Based Hazardous Production Processes to the Export Processing Zones of the Periphery: The Maquiladora Centers of Northern Mexico", Journal of World-Systems Research 9:317–354.
- Thomas Dietz, R. Scott Frey, and Eugene Rosa. 2002. "Technology, Risk, and Society", pp. 329–369 in Handbook of Environmental Sociology, edited by Riley Dunlap and William Michelson. Westport, CT: Greenwood Press.
- R. Scott Frey, editor. 2001. The Environment and Society Reader. Boston: Allyn and Bacon.
- R. Scott Frey. 2001. "Environmental Problems", pp. 3–25 in The Environment and Society Reader, edited by R. Scott Frey. Boston: Allyn and Bacon.
- R. Scott Frey and Carolyn Field. 2000. "The Determinants of Infant Mortality in the Less Developed Countries: A Cross-National Test of Five Theories", Social Indicators Research 52:215–234.
