= Karre Mastanamma =

Indian centenarian

Mastanamma
- Mastanamma with an emu egg
- Born: Karre Mastanamma; 10 April 1911; Andhra Pradesh
- Died: 2 December 2018 (aged 107)
- Citizenship: British Indian (1911-1947); Indian Dominion (1947-1950); Indian (1950-2018)
- Occupation: Cooking
- Years active: 2016-2018
- Known for: Indian cuisine
- Notable work: Baingan bharta

Karre Mastanamma (10 April 1911 – 3 December 2018) was an Indian centenarian who became a popular chef on YouTube with millions of followers. At the time of her death in 2018, she had 2 million followers on YouTube. Despite having little knowledge of technology and only a basic education in rural Andhra Pradesh in southern India, Mastanamma, filmed by her grandson, became an Internet sensation following her first recording making a Baingan bharta (aubergine curry) in 2016. She died in Gudiwada, her native village near Tenali in Guntur district on 3 December 2018.
