= Art Lentz =

American basketball player

Personal information
- Born: June 27, 1926 York, Pennsylvania, U.S.
- Died: December 8, 2018 (aged 92) York, Pennsylvania, U.S.

Career information
- High school: West York (York, Pennsylvania)
- College: York (Pennsylvania) (1947)
- Playing career: 1948–1952

Career history
- 1948–1951: York Victory A.C.
- 1951–1952: Pottsville Packers

Career highlights
- EPBL champion (1952); All-EPBL Second Team (1950)

Arthur H. Lentz (June 27, 1926 – December 8, 2018) was an American professional basketball player. He played in the Eastern Professional Basketball League (EPBL) for four seasons.

== Early life ==
Lentz was born in the borough of West York in York, Pennsylvania. He started playing basketball while attending a one-room school nicknamed "Corncob College" in North Codorus Township, York County. He attended West York High School and played basketball on the varsity team that won its league title in 1943.

== Military career ==
Lentz was about to graduate high school in 1944 when he turned 18 and received a summons to join the United States Army for World War II. He was assigned to the 119th Infantry of the 30th Division and was shipped to the front lines of the Battle of the Bulge. On February 23, 1945, Lentz and another soldier delivered a radio to a front-line unit by sprinting across 500 yards of open territory while under enemy fire; he received a Bronze Star Medal for heroic service. On March 24, 1945, he was grazed by a bullet as he delivered ammo to a forward unit near the town of Oerlinghausen in Germany. Lentz lost his upper lip in the incident and spent 30 days in hospital. For his actions, he was awarded a Purple Heart and an oak leaf cluster for his Bronze Star.

Lentz rejoined his unit as it approached Berlin before the city was taken over by Russian forces. He spent weeks on occupation duty before he boarded a ship bound for the Pacific. The war ended during his journey there and Lentz instead returned to the United States.

Lentz was assigned to Fort Knox in Kentucky and played basketball for the base team against college basketball teams. He scored 10 points while starting at center in a game against the Kentucky Wildcats.

Lentz was discharged from service and returned home to graduate from West York High School in 1946. He played basketball as he attended York College of Pennsylvania for half a season in 1947.

== Playing career ==
Lentz began his professional career in the Eastern Professional Basketball League (EPBL) with York Victory A.C. on a $25 a game contract. He led the league in scoring with 576 points during his rookie season in 1948–49. He received a raise to $35 a game during his second year in the league. Lentz was selected to the All-EPBL Second Team in the 1949–50 season. The York team failed to make enough money so it dissolved and Lentz moved to the Pottsville Packers. He won an EPBL championship with the Packers in 1952.

Lentz was recruited to play for the Baltimore Bullets of the National Basketball Association but turned down the offer because he had to relocate and received no financial improvements.

Lentz played baseball for multiple teams in the Southern York County League. Lentz helped to establish the Salvation Army Softball League in 1964. He served as a basketball official in York County for the Pennsylvania Interscholastic Athletic Association from 1964 to 1974. Lentz played basketball and softball in YMCA leagues until the age of 60.

== Later life ==
Lentz was employed at Rehmeyer, Inc, for over 20 years. He was the owner of a bowling alley from 1970 to 1980. Lentz worked for York College of Pennsylvania as a maintenance supervisor until his retirement in 1994.

Aged 90, Lentz began speaking engagements at local nursing homes where he recounted his personal experiences during World War II.

Lentz died at York Hospital on December 8, 2018, aged 92.
