= Eva Tichauer =

German Jewish doctor and Holocaust survivor

- Born: 26 January 1918; Berlin, Germany
- Died: 19 December 2018 (aged 100); Argenteuil, France
- Occupation: Doctor

Eva Tichauer (26 January 1918 – 19 December 2018) was a German Jewish doctor and Holocaust survivor.

== Biography ==
Eva Tichauer was born on 26 January 1918 in Berlin. She was the daughter of Theodore Tichauer and Erna Tichauer. Theodore Tichauer was a lawyer. In July 1933, the Tichauer family took refuge from the Nazi Germans in France. The Popular Front (1936–1938) is in power in France. The family became naturalized in 1937. When Philippe Pétain took office, they were stripped of their French nationality.

=== Deportation ===
Theodore Tichauer was arrested in December 1941. He was deported to Auschwitz. Eva Tichauer was 24 years old when she was arrested with her mother Erna in the Vel' d'Hiv Roundup, in July 1942. They were interned in Drancy and subsequently deported to Auschwitz.Tichauer survived the Shoah.

In January 1945, Tichauer was part of the death march to Ravensbrück. The guards abandoned the prisoners with the advance of the Russian troops, and the Russians liberated them on 23 April 1945.

=== Return to France ===
Eva Tichauer was released by the Red Army and repatriated by the Americans. She returned to Paris on 18 May 1945.

=== Medical Doctor ===
Before being deported, Eva Tichauer began her medical studies in 1937. On her return from deportation, she was alone, homeless and penniless. She managed to finish her medical studies. She joined the Ministry of National Education and became head of the departments of Manche and Gironde.

=== Argenteuil ===
In the 1970s, she moved to Argenteuil. She ended her career as head of the health office, after living in Nanterre. She was the Honorary Chief Inspector of Health 12.

=== Policy ===
Tichauer was a member of the French Communist Party from her freedom from the Nazis until 1995.

=== Works ===
- J'étais le numéro 20832 à Auschwitz. L’Harmattan (1992)
- Grâce à mes yeux bleus, j'ai survécu. Les impliqués (2017)
