= Curtis Grimm =

American economist (1953–2018)

Curtis M. "Curt" Grimm (July 10, 1953 – December 12, 2018) was an American economist.

"Curt" Grimm at the University of Maryland

Born in Red Wing, Minnesota, on July 10, 1953, Grimm moved with his family to Elkhorn, Wisconsin, where he attended high school. Grimm completed his bachelor's degree in economics at the University of Wisconsin–Madison, graduating in 1975. He then enrolled at the University of Freiburg in Germany, returning to the United States for a doctorate in economics from the University of California, Berkeley.

In 1983, Grimm began teaching at the Robert H. Smith School of Business of the University of Maryland, College Park, where he was named the Charles A. Taff Chair of Economics and Strategy. He chaired the Logistics, Business, and Public Policy department from 1995 to 2003 and again from 2017 until his death from pancreatic cancer on December 12, 2018.

During much of his tenure at the University of Maryland, Grimm did extensive research in Competitive Dynamics and supply chain issues, in particular transportation public policy concerning the railroad industry, such as deregulation and mergers.

He wrote four books and had more than 80 published writings. His books include:

- Dynamics of Competitive Strategy, 1992
- Strategy As Action: Competitive Dynamics and Competitive Advantage, 2005
- Industry Rivalry and Coordination, 1997
