= Robert Nelson (economist) =

American economist

Robert H. Nelson
- Born: 1944 (age 80–81)
- Died: 15 December 2018

Academic work
- Discipline: Economics

Robert Henry Nelson (1944 – December 15, 2018) was an American economist who was professor of environmental policy in the University of Maryland School of Public Policy and a senior fellow of the Independent Institute. He authored over 100 journal articles and edited book chapters, as well as nine books. Nelson was a nationally recognized authority in areas including the management of public land and zoning in the United States, but is best known for his books about the relationship between economics, environmentalism, and Christianity.

In a review of Economics As Religion: From Samuelson to Chicago and Beyond, economist Robert Tollison wrote that "Nelson's basic thesis is that economics is more like a religion than a science. In fact, he argues that economics in the twentieth century has virtually supplanted organized religion with a creed of material progress." Economist David Colander described Reaching for Heaven on Earth: The Theological Meaning of Economics as arguing that "the economics profession is the priesthood of a powerful secular religion." Nelson's book The New Holy Wars: Economic Religion versus Environmental Religion was silver medal winner in the "Finance, Investment, Economics" category of the 2010 Independent Publisher Book Awards.

== Books ==
- The Use and Management of Federal Coal (PERC, 2017)
- God? Very Probably: Five Rational Ways to Think about the Question of a God (Cascade Books, 2015) ISBN 978-1498223751
- The New Holy Wars: Economic Religion versus Environmental Religion in Contemporary America (Penn State University Press, 2010) ISBN 978-0271035826
- Private Neighborhoods and the Transformation of Local Government (Urban Institute Press, 2005) ISBN 978-0877667513
- Economics as Religion: From Samuelson to Chicago and Beyond (Penn State University Press, 2001) ISBN 978-0271022840
- A Burning Issue: A Case for Abolishing the U.S. Forest Service (Rowman & Littlefield, 2000) ISBN 978-0847697359
- Public Lands and Private Rights: The Failure of Scientific Management (Rowman & Littlefield, 1995) ISBN 978-0847680092
- Reaching for Heaven on Earth: The Theological Meaning of Economics (Rowman & Littlefield, 1991) ISBN 978-0822630241
- The Making of Federal Coal Policy (Duke University Press, 1983) ISBN 978-0822304975
- Zoning and Property Rights (MIT Press, 1977) ISBN 978-0262640190
