= Conrad Leslie =

American businessman and crop forecaster (1923–2018)

R. Conrad Leslie Jr. (1923 – December 25, 2018) was an American businessman and crop forecaster, described by The New York Times as "the nation's leading private harvest forecaster". His monthly corn, soybean, and wheat production estimates were very influential, and his opinions were well-regarded by various news outlets. The majority of interest in his daily price interpretations and daily market observations came from brokers and their clients such as Thomson McKinnon and ADM Investors Services. He died in December 2018 at the age of 95.

== Early life ==
Conrad Leslie was born in Springfield, Ohio, and raised in Xenia, Ohio. Before World War II, Leslie studied in the pre-med program at Miami University in Oxford, Ohio. During the war, at age 21, he became a B-24 bomber pilot and flew 35 missions over Germany. For this, he was awarded the Distinguished Flying Cross and the Air Medal with three clusters.

When he returned to school, he felt too old to stay on the pre-med track and switched to banking and finance. While At Miami University, Conrad became a member of the Alpha chapter of Beta Theta Pi.

== Finance career ==
After graduating in 1947, Leslie became a salesman for Procter & Gamble. When Merrill Lynch announced it would be starting a program to bring Wall Street to the rest of the country, Leslie quickly joined the program. He qualified for Merrill Lynch broker training and after a year of study on Wall Street was assigned to its Columbus office. Soon after his placement in the Columbus office, he became impatient with the dormant stock market. He noticed that a greater challenge was the daily price activity in the grain futures market. In addition to this problem, there was a need to educate farmers on how to hedge their crops.

Leslie moved to Chicago and there, during his fifty years in the business world, appraised the overnight news and then wrote a pre-opening market letter to the brokers at four different New York Stock Exchange Member firms.

Leslie's collection of market wisdom and experiences was presented to the financial world via his book Conrad Leslie's Guide for Successful Speculation, Stocks, Commodities, Gold. The Chicago Tribune's financial editor presented a series of excerpts from this book for ten Sundays.

In 1961, he felt that the first-of-the-month crop production farmer-based estimates issued by the United States Department of Agriculture on the 10th of the month were too delayed to enable efficient agribusiness marketing decisions. He developed his own faster released production estimates by using card reports received from 3,000 grain elevator managers.

At the request of the Nixon White House, and recommendation from Senator Hubert Humphrey, Conrad Leslie conducted a special survey to estimate the size of the coming U.S. wheat harvest before the Russian wheat sale was granted by Washington. His presented supply and demand projection was very helpful to the country because it indicated that the approaching U.S. harvest would permit the sale with Russia.

Another notable contribution of Leslie's was his influential writings, which were instrumental in legislation that allowed Americans to own gold. Back when gold was priced at $35 an ounce, Leslie noted the French were taking our gold from Fort Knox. Through his writings to 2,000 elevator managers and regular farmland press, radio, and television interviews, he was persistently among those who called on Congress to pass the bill that would allow Americans to own gold. President Nixon, with support of Senator Jacob K. Javits and Congressman Phil Crane, lifted the ban on August 15, 1975.

== Legacy ==
At his 40-year anniversary as a member of the Chicago Board of Trade, he was awarded a special plaque by the organization. When he retired at age 78, on behalf of the Senate Agriculture Committee, Senators Lugar and Harkin thanked him via letter for his 40 years of service to American Agribusiness. The City of Xenia recently selected him to be a citizen of the year.

== Works ==
- Leslie, Conrad (1970). Conrad Leslie's Guide for successful speculating: stocks, commodities, gold. Dartnell. ISBN 978-0850130294.
- Leslie, Conrad (2017). Tolles, Jamie (ed.). Conrad Leslie's 12 Laws For Selecting a Stock. Independently published. ISBN 978-1521008591.
- Leslie, Conrad (2018). Tolles, Jamie (ed.). 30 Tips for Better Investing. Independently published. ISBN 978-0692075654.
