= Tom Johnson (footballer, born 1926) =

English footballer (1926–2018)

Personal information
- Full name: Thomas Johnson
- Date of birth: 5 March 1926
- Place of birth: Stockton-on-Tees, England
- Date of death: 9 December 2018 (aged 92)
- Height: 5 ft 8 in (1.73 m)
- Positions: Left half; inside forward

Youth career
- Seaton Holy Trinity

Senior career*
Years	Team	Apps	(Gls)
1945–1947	Middlesbrough	0	(0)
1947–194?	Darlington	6	(1)
194?–1949	Stockton		
1949–1952	Horden Colliery Welfare		
1952–1953	Bradford Park Avenue	1	(0)
1953–1954	Annfield Plain		
1954–19??	Horden Colliery Welfare		
- * Club domestic league appearances and goals

Thomas Johnson (5 March 1926 – 9 December 2018), known as Tom or Tommy Johnson, was an English footballer who played as a left half or inside forward in the Football League for Darlington and Bradford Park Avenue. He later worked as a physiotherapist for Hartlepool United and Middlesbrough.

== Life and career ==
Johnson was born in Stockton-on-Tees. He played football for Seaton Holy Trinity before signing professional forms with Middlesbrough in early 1945. He played for their first team in wartime football, but made no appearances in the Football League once that competition resumed, and joined Darlington in July 1947 while he was still serving in the Royal Air Force. He made his senior debut in the opening match of the 1947–48 Third Division North season, a 4–2 defeat away to Carlisle United, and appeared in four of the next five fixtures, scoring in a 1–1 draw at home to Gateshead on 1 September. He made one more league appearance later in the season, and then moved into non-league football with Stockton and Horden Colliery Welfare. Johnson signed for Bradford Park Avenue in August 1952. Apart from one league appearance, away to Barrow in September, he played reserve-team football before moving back into non-league with Annfield Plain and a further spell with Horden CW.

After his retirement at the age of 30 due to a head injury, Johnson retrained as a physiotherapist. He went on to work for Hartlepool United for 25 years, before moving to Middlesbrough in 1986, from where he eventually retired in 1997.

Johnson was married to Evelyn; the couple had one son, Graham. Johnson died on 9 December 2018 at the age of 92.
