= Rosanell Eaton =

American civil rights worker (1921–2018)

- Born: Rosanell Johnson; April 14, 1921; Louisburg, North Carolina, U.S.
- Died: December 8, 2018 (aged 97); Louisburg, North Carolina, U.S.
- Occupation: Civil rights activist

Rosanell Johnson Eaton (April 14, 1921 – December 8, 2018) was an American civil rights worker. She registered more than 4,000 citizens to vote in North Carolina, and was active for voting rights into her mid-nineties.

== Early life and education ==
Johnson was born on a farm near Louisburg, North Carolina, the daughter of Edmund Johnson and Mamie Eaton Johnson. Her parents owned a farm and raised tobacco and cotton; her father died when Johnson was a young girl. She was the valedictorian of her class at Albion Academy in Franklinton.

== Voting rights activism ==
In 1942, when she was 21 years old, Eaton became one of the first African Americans to vote in Franklin County, after passing a literacy test that included reciting from memory the entire preamble to the United States Constitution. She registered more than 4,000 citizens to vote in North Carolina, worked at the polls, spoke at rallies, and was a member of the NAACP. She experienced threats for her activism, including bullets fired at her home and damage to her property. In 1963 she attended the March on Washington for Jobs and Freedom. In her last years, she was active in opposing voter identification laws, saying "We have been this way before, but now we have been turned back and it's a shame and a disgrace, and absolutely disgusting." She and her daughter joined a 2013 lawsuit against such laws.

In August 2015, President Obama, in his response to the New York Times cover story on "Efforts over the last 50 years to dismantle the protections in the Voting Rights Act of 1965", wrote that he was inspired by people like Rosanell Eaton. "She has not given up. She's still marching. She's still fighting to make real the promise of America," he wrote. "And if we join her, we, too, can reaffirm the fundamental truth of the words Rosanell recited."

== Personal life ==
Johnson married Golden Eaton in 1942, and they had four children. She worked in a factory and as a teacher's assistant. Eaton's husband died in 1963. She died at home in 2018, at the age of 97. Her papers are in the Southern Historical Collection at the University of North Carolina at Chapel Hill.
