= Andrzej Skupiński =

Polish actor (1952–2018)

- Born: 12 February 1952; Chorzów, Poland
- Died: 19 December 2018 (aged 66); Chorzów, Poland
- Education: University of Silesia in Katowice
- Occupation: Actor

Andrzej Skupiński (12 February 1952 – 19 December 2018) was a Polish actor.

== Biography ==
Andrzej Skupiński attended the high school Juliusz Słowackiego in Chorzów, Poland. He studied Polish philology at the University of Silesia in Katowice.

Skupiński started his career teaching Polish in elementary schools. He then became a journalist for "Dziennik Śląski," a daily Polish newspaper. He joined the Union of Polish Authors and Composers in 1988.

He was involved in artistic activities on stage (cabaret, recitals, staging and realization of scenic events of the author). He wrote artistic texts for the needs of the stage and the film, he translated the texts of the classics of the American scene (swing & musical), as well as popular French, German and Russian music into Polish and Silesian. He has also consulted widely-graduated undergraduate and graduate degrees (Polish philology, musicology, history of art, general pedagogy, sociology of culture).

== Filmography ==
- Grzeszny żywot Franciszka Buły by Janusz Kidawa (1980)
- Anna i Wampir by Janusz Kidawa (1981)
- Komedianci z wczorajszej ulicy by Janusz Kidawa (1986)
- Angelus by Lech Majewski (2001)
- Benek by Robert Gliński (2006)
- Kant-Pol by Eugeniusz Kluczniok (2006)
- Wesołych świąt by Tomasz Jurkiewicz (2008)
- Byzuch by Eugeniusz Kluczniok (2008)
