= Eraldo Isidori =

Italian politician (1940–2018)

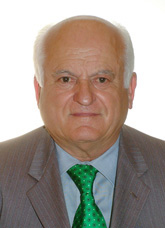

Member of the Italian Chamber of Deputies
- In office 2010–2012

Personal details
- Born: 17 June 1940 Macerata, Marche, Italy
- Died: 16 December 2018 (aged 78) Bologna, Italy
- Party: Lega Nord

Eraldo Isidori (17 June 1940 – 16 December 2018) was an Italian politician.

== Biography ==
He became famous in 1979, when his young son, who was 5 years old, disappeared and Blessed John Paul asked the unknown abductor to reveal what happened to the child. In 2010 was chosen to replace Roberto Zaffini as a member of the Italian Chamber of Deputies.

He came up again in 2012, when, during his speech to the Chamber of Deputies, he said some sentences containing many mistakes and grammatical errors. He said, "Il carcere è un penitenziario… non è un villaggio di vaganza… si deve scontare la sua pena perscritta… che gli aspetta… lo sapeva prima fare il reato… io ritengo come Lega… di non-uscire prima della sua pena erogata, grazie", translated as "A prison is a penitentiary... it isn't a halyday camp... you have to serve his term of imprisonment... that is up to (literally wait) him... he knew that before he did the violation... I consider as Lega Nord not to exit before his supplied term, thank you."

In 2013, interviewed by journalists of the TV program Le Iene, he made another poor showing, ignoring the word eutanasia (in English euthanasia), declaring that Mozart and Beethoven were Latin American music's composers and affirming that in the Gaza Strip there is a conflict between Christians and Buddhists.
