= Sonja Ashauer =

Brazilian physicist (1923–1948)

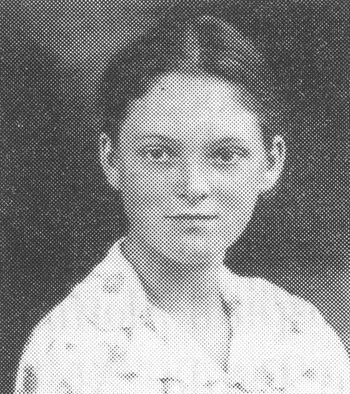
- Sonja Ashauer
- Born: April 9, 1923; São Paulo, Brazil
- Died: August 21, 1948 (aged 25)
- Education: University of São Paulo, University of Cambridge
- Known for: First Brazilian woman to earn a doctorate in physics
- Scientific career
- Fields: Physics
- Thesis: Problems in electrons and electromagnetic radiation (1948)
- Academic advisors: Paul Dirac, Gleb Wataghin

Sonja Ashauer (9 April 1923 – 21 August 1948) was a Brazilian physicist. She was the first Brazilian woman to earn a doctorate in physics, and the second to become a physics graduate in Brazil.

== Biography ==
Born in São Paulo, Ashauer was the daughter of the German-born engineer Walter Ashauer and his wife Herta Graffenbenger who had emigrated to Brazil. From 1935 to 1939, she pursued her secondary education at Gymnasium of São Paulo state capital. Encouraged by her father, after secondary school, she studied physics under Gleb Wataghin at the University of São Paulo, graduating in 1942. She was the second female physics graduate in Brazil, the first being Yolande Monteux who graduated in 1938.

In January 1948, she became the first woman from Brazil to be awarded a doctorate in physics after studying for three years at the University of Cambridge under the Nobel prizewinner Paul Dirac. She was said to have been a brilliant student. Her thesis (Problems in electrons and electromagnetic radiation) explored the cutting-edge field of quantum electrodynamics. In this research, Ashauer focused on solving the problem that when the electron was modeled as a point source, its self-energy tended to infinity. In March 1948, she returned to Brazil, where she was appointed as Wataghin's assistant.

Ashauer was the first woman from Brazil elected as a member of the Cambridge Philosophical Society.

Later that year, after catching a cold on a rainy day, she contracted pneumonia. She was taken to hospital, but she died six days later on 21 August 1948. The cause of death stated on the death certificate was "broncopneumonia, myocarditis, and heart failure".

== Publications ==
- Ashauer, Sonja (1948). Problems on Electrons and Electromagnetic Radiation Sonja Ashauer. University of Cambridge.
