= Daniela Payssé =

Uruguayan politician (1946–2018)

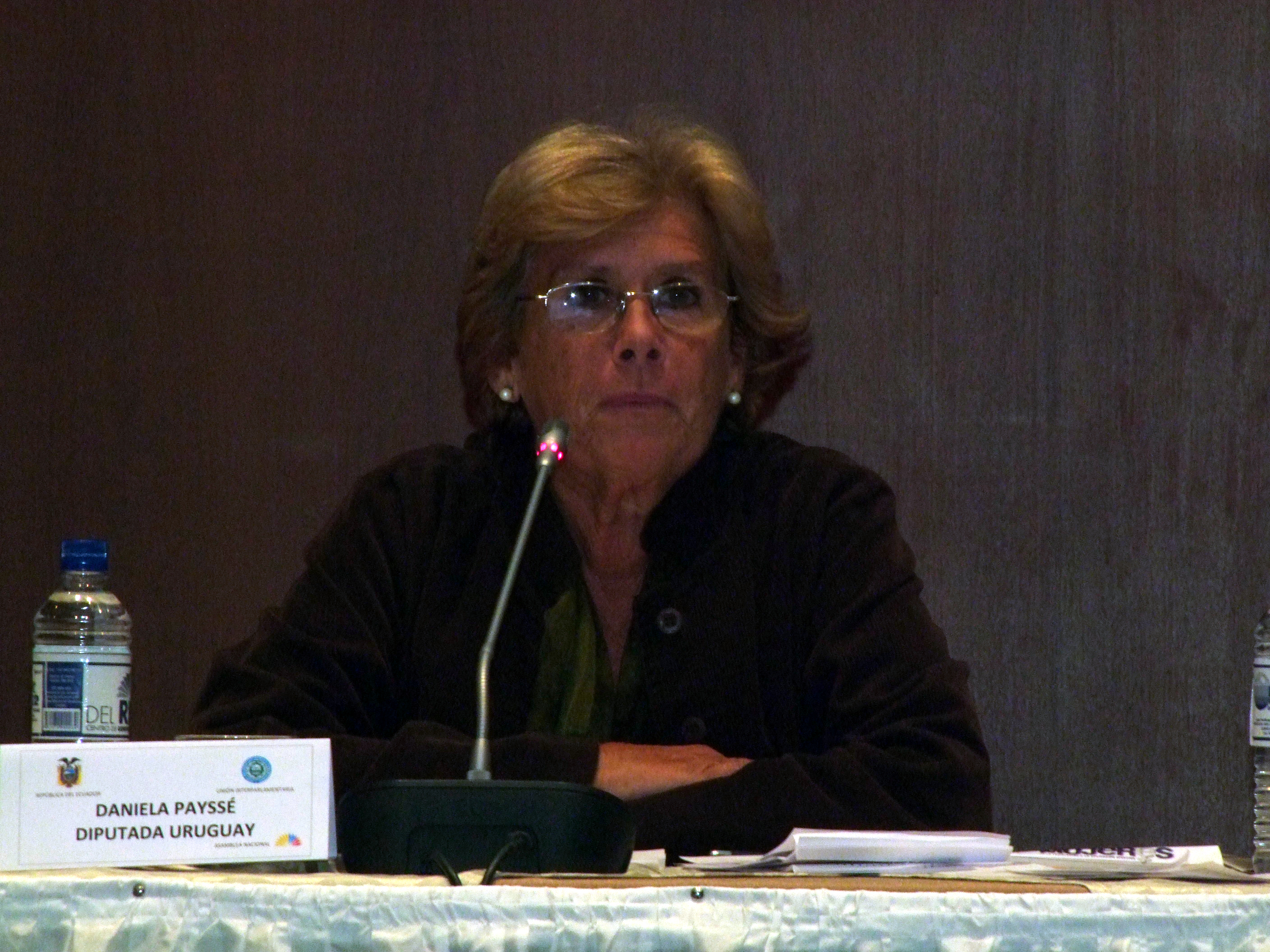

Senator of Uruguay
- In office 2015–2018

Deputy of the Republic
- In office 2005–2015
- Constituency: Montevideo

Personal details
- Born: 17 October 1946 Montevideo, Uruguay
- Died: 21 December 2018 (aged 72)
- Party: Broad Front (Uruguay Assembly)

Daniela Payssé (17 October 1946 – 21 December 2018) was a Uruguayan senator for the Broad Front party.

== Early life ==
Payssé was born in Montevideo and was a teacher at, and later the director of, the Instituto Pedagogico Infantil (the Children's Peagogical Institute) from 1968 to 1995.

== Political career ==
In 2000 Payssé was an alternate national representative for Montevideo, a position she held until 2005, joining the Finance Commission. In 2005 she was re-elected as a National Representative by the Uruguay Assembly sector of the Broad Front. During this period she joined the Commissions on Human Rights, Budgets, and Gender and Equity. She also chaired the Special Commission of the General Assembly for the Follow-up of the Prison Situation. She chaired the Human Rights Commission of the General Assembly, in charge of the integration of the Directive Council of the National Institution of Human Rights and Ombudsman.

In 2010, she was reelected again as National Representative for Montevideo. Payssé was part of the Human Rights, Budget, and Special Commissions on Gender and Equity, Special Commission for Monitoring the Prison Situation of the General Assembly, and was also a member of the Bicameral Women's Bank which is made up of legislators from all the political parties of Uruguay. She joined the Mercosur Parliament for the period 2010–2015. In a 2010 debate she argued against the use of the theory of the two demons when interpreting the Law on the Expiration of the Punitive Claims of the State. In 2013, she assumed the first vice presidency of the House of Representatives. She also held the position of deputy president of the Honorary Commission for the Fight against Cancer.

In the 2014 general election she was elected senator for her party.

== Personal life ==
Payssé had six children and eight grandchildren.

She died in Montevideo from an infarction on 21 December 2018. She was 72 years old.
