= Ljupka Džundeva =

Macedonian actress (1934–2018)

- Born: July 11, 1934; Skopje, Kingdom of Yugoslavia
- Died: 7 December 2018 (aged 84); Skopje, North Macedonia
- Occupation: Actress
- Years active: 1961-1999

Ljupka Arsova - Džundeva (Macedonian: Љупка Арсова - Џундева; 11 July 1934 – 7 December 2018) was a Macedonian film and theater actress.

== Biography ==
Džundeva was born in Skopje, Macedonia. She graduated from State Theatre School and became a member of the Macedonian National Theatre in 1951, where she worked until her retirement in 1990. She successfully implemented monodrama too. She was awarded the "13th of November" award of the City of Skopje in 1983 in the field of culture and art, then the award for artistic accomplishment conferred by the Yugoslav Radio Television, the "Decoration of Labour with Silver Wreath".

== Filmography ==
- 1961: A Quiet Summer (Main role)
- 1967: Macedonian Bloody Wedding (Supporting role)
- 1980: The Lead Brigade (Supporting role)
- 1997: Gypsy Magic (Supporting role)
- 1999: Life, Time (Main role)
