= Sylvester Greenaway =

Montserratian cricketer

Personal information
- Full name: Ronald Sylvester Greenaway
- Born: 9 May 1946; Montserrat
- Died: 15 December 2018 (aged 72); Mississauga, Ontario, Canada
- Nickname: Nul
- Batting: Right-handed

Domestic team information
- Years: Team
- 1971/72: Leeward Islands
- 1961–1975: Montserrat

Career statistics
| Competition | First-class |
|---|---|
| Matches | 2 |
| Runs scored | 15 |
| Batting average | 3.75 |
| 100s/50s | 0/0 |
| Top score | 11 |
| Catches/stumpings | 2/– |
- Source: Cricinfo, 14 October 2012

Sylvester Greenaway (9 May 1946 – 15 December 2018) was a West Indian cricketer. Greenaway was a right-handed batsman. He was born on Montserrat.

Greenaway first played for Montserrat in 1961 as a 15-year-old. He was a substitute for Montserrat opener Peter Cabey, who was unable to play on Saturdays because he was a Seventh Day Adventist. He got the nickname "Nul" as a boy. The nickname started out as "Nald"—short for his actual first name of Ronald—but evolved into "Nul". From the late 1960s through 1975, Greenaway was Montserrat's omnipresent opening batsman, often with Vendol "Gary" Moore (1945–2012). In 1972, Greenaway played two first-class matches for the Leeward Islands. The first came against the Windward Islands, while the second came against the touring New Zealanders. However, in four batting innings he scored just 15 runs at an average of 3.75. He played his final season for Montserrat in the 1975 Leeward Islands tournament. Ironically, he scored the only century of his career against Antigua that summer, finishing with 157 as he and Jim Allen put on a partnership of 240 runs. In the 1980s, the Montserrat cricket team had another player named Sylvester "Ben" Greenaway (no relation). The two players' careers are often mixed up. Sylvester "Nul" Greenaway relocated to Canada after his cricket career ended and became highly skilled in offset printing.

Greenaway died on 15 December 2018, in Mississauga, Ontario, Canada, after a long illness.
