= P. M. Forni =

Italian-born American professor

Pier Massimo Forni (16 October 1951 – 1 December 2018), a native of Italy, was a professor at Johns Hopkins University, where he taught since 1985. Forni published several books, including his 2002 best-seller Choosing Civility: The Twenty-Five Rules of Considerate Conduct. He co-founded and directed the Civility Project at Johns Hopkins, the purpose of which is to assess the significance of civility, manners and politeness in contemporary society.

== Education and career ==
Forni received his undergraduate degree in Letters and Philosophy from the University of Pavia and his Ph.D. in Italian literature from UCLA. His numerous published writings on Italian literature include Forme complesse nel Decameron (1992) and Adventures in Speech: Rhetoric and Narration in Boccaccio's Decameron (1996). Forni held visiting appointments at several U. S. universities including the University of Pennsylvania, the University of Virginia, and the University of California at Davis. In Italy, he lectured at the University of Venice, the University of Naples, and the University of Florence, among others. He was a former Fellow of Villa I Tatti, The Harvard University Center for Italian Renaissance Studies in Florence.

== Civility Project at Johns Hopkins University ==
In 1997, he co-founded the Johns Hopkins Civility Project, whose aim was to assess the significance of civility, manners and politeness in contemporary society. He was also co-director of "Reassessing Civility: Forms and Values at the End of the Century," an international symposium which took place at Johns Hopkins University in March 1998. Forni was to become the director of The Civility Initiative at Johns Hopkins University—which he founded in 2000. He frequently lectured and conducted workshops on the rewards of fostering a culture of civility in today's workplace and the connections among civility, ethics, and quality of life.

== Publications ==
In 2002, Forni published the best-seller Choosing Civility: The Twenty-Five Rules of Considerate Conduct. Since then the book has acquired the status of a little classic within the American civility movement. His second book on civility, The Civility Solution: What to Do When People Are Rude (2008) provides examples on how to respond effectively and civilly in different day-to-day rude encounters. He contributed to a chapter on ethics and international protocol in the Convention Industry Council International Manual (2005). His article "The Other Side of Civility" appeared in the November 2005 issue of the Johns Hopkins magazine. "Why Civility Means Business: A Memo to the B-School Dean (Cc: the CEO)" was published in the Spring/Summer 2011 issue of One, the magazine of the Johns Hopkins Carey Business School. In 2009 the Association of Image Consultants International awarded him the Image Makers Merit of Industry Excellence Bravo Award, which counts among its past awardees Oprah Winfrey, Michael Bloomberg, and Target Stores.

== Initiatives ==
Forni's work has inspired civility-based initiatives around the United States, such as those in Duluth, MN, Cleveland Heights, OH, Howard County, MD, Hershey, Pennsylvania, Oshkosh, Wisconsin, and Lake Charles, Louisiana. Among the academic institutions which selected Choosing Civility for their common reading programs are Grand Rapids Community College, Lynn University, Occidental College, Southern Utah University, Muskingum University, the University of West Georgia, Frank Phillips College, Spelman College and Monroe Community College.

== Reception ==
Forni's work has been mentioned by numerous publications including The New York Times, The Times, The Washington Post, The Wall Street Journal, The Los Angeles Times, and Forbes magazine. He was interviewed on several high-profile radio and televisions shows, including the ABC's World News Tonight, CBS Sunday Morning, The Gayle King Show, BBC's Outlook, and Oprah. Forni's contribution to the civility movement that started in the United States at the turn of the millennium is featured in Benet Davetian's Civility: A Cultural History (2009). In a profile which appeared in 2008, Smithsonian magazine stated that P.M. Forni "will be remembered as one of the greatest generals in our nation's struggle for civility."
