= Gennaro Papa =

Italian politician (1925–2018)

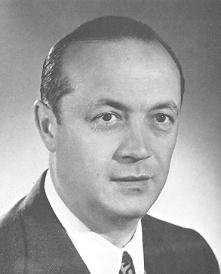
Gennaro Papa

Gennaro Papa (23 March 1925 – 31 December 2018) was an Italian politician who served as a Deputy from 1961 to 1963 and from 1968 to 1976.
