= Giorgio Degola =

Italian politician (1923–2018)

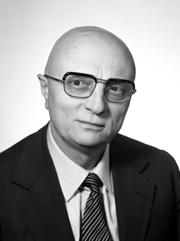

Senator of the Italian Republic
- In office 5 July 1976 – 1 July 1987
- Constituency: Emilia-Romagna

Personal details
- Born: 9 August 1923 Albinea, Emilia-Romagna, Italy
- Died: 27 December 2018 (aged 95) Albinea, Emilia-Romagna, Italy
- Party: Christian Democrat
- Children: 3

Giorgio Degola (9 August 1923 – 27 December 2018) was an Italian politician of the Christian Democrats.

== Biography ==
Degola was born on 9 August 1923 in Albinea to Giovanni Degola, an engineer, and the daughter of a Reggio landowner.

Degola would go on to become an industrialist, through the Degola and Ferretti firm, becoming one of the most important post-war building contractors. He was also a prominent leader of the football team, A.C. Reggiana 1919 in the 1950's and 1960's; sharing the vice presidency of the club with Gino Lari and Carlo Visconti.

Degola served as a Senator from 1976 to 1987 in the constituency of Emilia-Romagna as part of Christian Democracy.

He died in Albinea, Italy on 27 December 2018.
