= Roy Woolcott =

English footballer

Personal information
- Full name: Roy Alfred Woolcott
- Date of birth: 29 July 1946
- Place of birth: Leyton, England
- Date of death: 16 December 2018 (aged 72)
- Place of death: Waltham Abbey, England
- Position: Forward

Senior career*
Years	Team	Apps	(Gls)
- Eton Manor
1968–1972	Tottenham Hotspur	1	(0)
1972	→ Gillingham (loan)	13	(5)
1972–1974	Chelmsford City	82	(46)
- Tonbridge
- Folkestone & Shepway
- * Club domestic league appearances and goals

Roy Alfred Woolcott (29 July 1946 – 16 December 2018) was an English professional footballer who played as a forward.

== Playing career ==
Woolcott began his career at non–league club Eton Manor before joining Tottenham Hotspur in February 1968. The forward made one senior appearance for Spurs on 27 December 1969 in a Football League game against Ipswich Town at Portman Road which Ipswich Town won 2–0. Woolcott joined Gillingham on loan in February 1972 and went on feature in 13 matches and scored five goals. After leaving the Kent club he played for Chelmsford City. After 46 goals in 82 games for Chelmsford, Woolcott moved on to Tonbridge due to injuries sustained during his time at Chelmsford, before later playing for Folkestone & Shepway.

Woolcott died on 16 December 2018 after a short illness at the Paternoster Care Home, Waltham Abbey.
