= J. Evan Sadler =

American hematologist

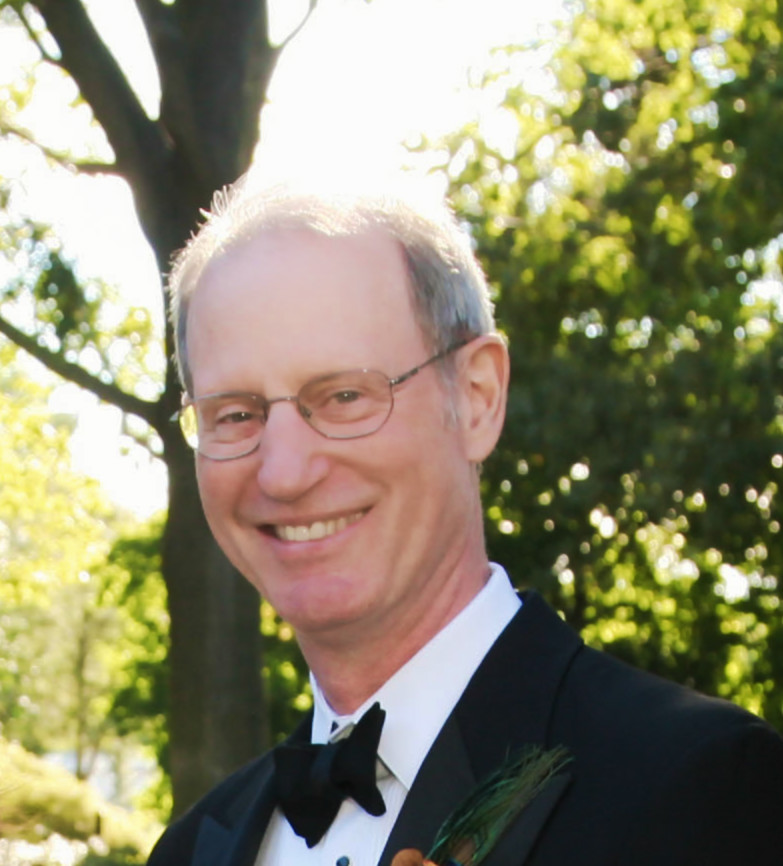
Dr. J. Evan Sadler

Jasper Evan Sadler III (9 November 1951 – 13 December 2018) was an American hematologist.

Sadler was born in Huntington, West Virginia, on 9 November 1951 to pathologist Jasper Evan Sadler Jr. and his wife Clara Rose Thompson Sadler. The younger Sadler studied chemistry at Princeton University and completed a medical degree at Duke University School of Medicine. Sadler completed his residency at Duke and a fellowship at the University of Washington and subsequently joined Washington University School of Medicine faculty in 1984. Between 1982 and 2008, Sadler was a Howard Hughes Medical Investigator. In 2014, Sadler was appointed Ira M. Lang Professor of Medicine.

In 1988, Sadler was elected a member of the American Society for Clinical Investigation. He was granted fellowship by the American Association for the Advancement of Science in 1998, and membership by the National Academy of Medicine in 2013. Sadler was president of the American Society of Hematology and won the organization's Henry M. Stratton Medal for Basic Science in 2016, followed by its Exemplary Service Award in 2018. He received the Distinguished Career Award and Robert P. Grant Medal from the International Society on Thrombosis and Haemostasis in 2001 and 2018, respectively. Sadler died of Creutzfeldt-Jakob disease in Clayton, Missouri, on 13 December 2018, aged 67.
