= James Johnson Kelly =

Tuskegee Airman and USAF officier (1928–2018)

Major James Johnson Kelly
- Major James Kelly Tuskegee Airman
- Born: March 29, 1928; High Point, North Carolina, U.S.
- Died: December 29, 2018 (aged 90); San Antonio, Texas, U.S.
- Burial place: Fort Sam Houston National Cemetery
- Spouse: Sally
- Military career
- Allegiance: United States of America
- Branch: United States Army Air Force; Air Force of the United States
- Service years: 1946–1971
- Rank: Major
- Unit: 332nd Fighter Group
- Commands: Squadron Commander
- Conflicts: Battle of Chosin Reservoir
- Awards: Korean Service Medal; UN Service Medal

James Johnson Kelly (March 29, 1928 – December 29, 2018) was a United States Army Air Force/United States Air Force officer who served with the 99th Fighter Squadron and 332nd Fighter Group. He served in the Korean War at the Battle of Chosin Reservoir, and he retired in 1971 as a Major in the Air Force and a Squadron Commander.

== Early life and education ==
Kelly was born in High Point, North Carolina and at an early age his family moved to Lynchburg, Virginia.

== Military service ==
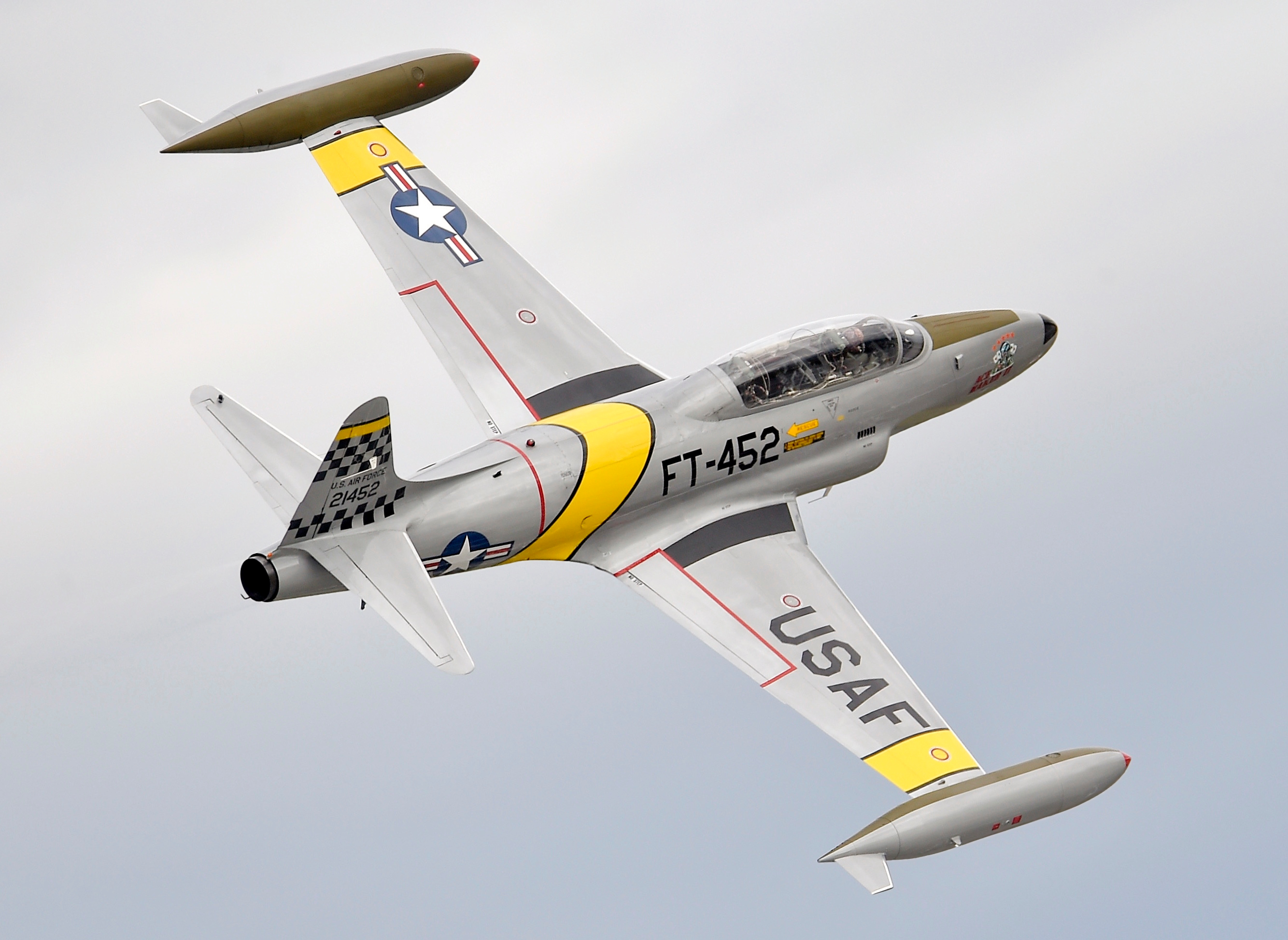
Kelly qualified in The Lockheed T-33 Shooting Star.

In 1946 Kelly entered the Army Air Forces and he was assigned to the 99th Fighter Squadron and 332nd Fighter Group. Kelly started as a Technical Sergeant and eventually earned a commission at Lackland AFB in 1955, in San Antonio as a First Lieutenant. By the time he retired after 28 years in the Air Force Kelly was a Major. He qualified as an instructor for the AT-6 and T-33. He also became a Squadron Commander.

In the Korean War, Kelly earned medals for evacuating wounded Marines at the Battle of Chosin Reservoir.

== Later life ==
In 1959, he married a single mother (Sally) and became a stepfather for her daughter and later had a son, Thomas Edward Kelly. He held many positions in his chosen hometown, San Antonio, Texas: VC San Antonio Planning Commission, Southern Christian Leadership Conference, Community Workers Council of San Antonio, and he was a trustee on the Our Lady of the Lake University Trustee Board.

He was buried with honors at Fort Sam Houston National Cemetery January 10, 2019.

== Awards ==
- Korean Service Medal
- UN Service Medal

== See also ==
- Executive Order 9981
- Military history of African Americans
- Fly (2009 play about the 332d Fighter Group)
