= Bruce Buggins =

Australian cricketer (1935–2018)

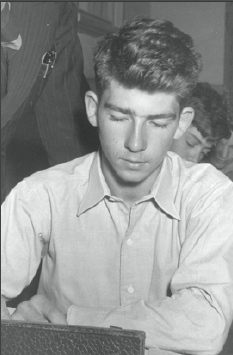
- Young Bruce Buggins, attending Kent Street High School

Personal information
- Full name: Bruce Leonard Buggins
- Born: 29 January 1935; Perth, Western Australia
- Died: 5 December 2018 (aged 83); Perth, Western Australia
- Batting: Right-handed
- Role: Wicket-keeper

Career statistics
Competition	First-class
Matches	63
Runs scored	1192
Batting average	14.36
100s/50s	0/1
Top score	60*
Balls bowled	3
Wickets	1
Bowling average	1.00
5 wickets in innings	0
10 wickets in match	0
Best bowling	1/1
Catches/stumpings	148/19
- Source: Cricinfo, 19 October 2021

Bruce Leonard Buggins (29 January 1935 – 5 December 2018) was an Australian cricketer. He played 63 first-class matches as Western Australia's wicket-keeper between 1954–55 and 1962-63.

At the age of 17, before he had begun to play first-class cricket, Buggins was regarded as a possible future Test wicketkeeper by "several good judges who saw him keep against the Englishmen in 1950". On the opening day of his first-class debut in November 1954, he caught four South Australian batsmen and conceded no byes in the first innings of 296. He had replaced John Munro in the selected team after Munro became unavailable. Buggins kept his place in the team for nine seasons.

Buggins represented South Perth in Premier Cricket and still holds the club record for most dismissals for a wicket-keeper, with 199 catches and 97 stumpings. He worked in the brewing industry in Perth.
