= Brian Blank =

Canadian-American mathematician (1953–2018)

Brian Blank (September 3, 1953 – December 9, 2018) was a Canadian/American associate professor of mathematics at Washington University in St. Louis.

Blank was born in Montreal, Quebec, and earned an undergraduate degree in mathematics from McGill University. He received his Masters and Ph.D. in 1980 from Cornell University, with Anthony Knapp as advisor. His 20th century work involved harmonic analysis. He also co-authored a pair of calculus textbooks with his Washington University colleague, Steven Krantz. Titled Calculus: Single Variable and Calculus: Multivariable, the textbooks and workbooks used to be used in calculus classes at Washington University.

Blank died on December 9, 2018, due to complications of acute congestive heart failure.
