= Paul Niedermann =

German journalist and photographer (1927–2018)

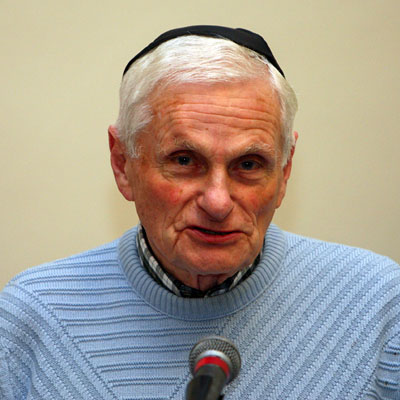
- Born: 1 November 1927; Karlsruhe, Germany
- Died: 7 December 2018 (aged 91); Paris, France
- Occupations: Journalist; Photographer

Paul Niedermann (1 November 1927 – 7 December 2018) was a German-Jewish journalist and photographer.

== Biography ==
In 1940, Niedermann escaped his homeland of Germany to the French province of Pyrénées-Atlantiques. Niedermann was one of the Jewish children in the orphanage at Izieu, France. He managed to escape Nazi capture by escaping to Switzerland in 1944. A book title Children of Izieu would be written about the orphanage that sheltered the Jewish children from Nazi rule. Niedermann would later testify in the trial against Klaus Barbie.

After World War II ended, Niedermann settled down in Paris and became a writer and photographer. His testimony against Klaus Barbie, Niedermann went back to his home city of Karlsruhe and told of the struggles he went through to avoid Nazi capture. After the trial, he was invited to speak at numerous lectures.

Paul Niedermann died on 7 December 2018 at the age of 91.
