= Marc Olivier =

Belgian politician (1940–2018)

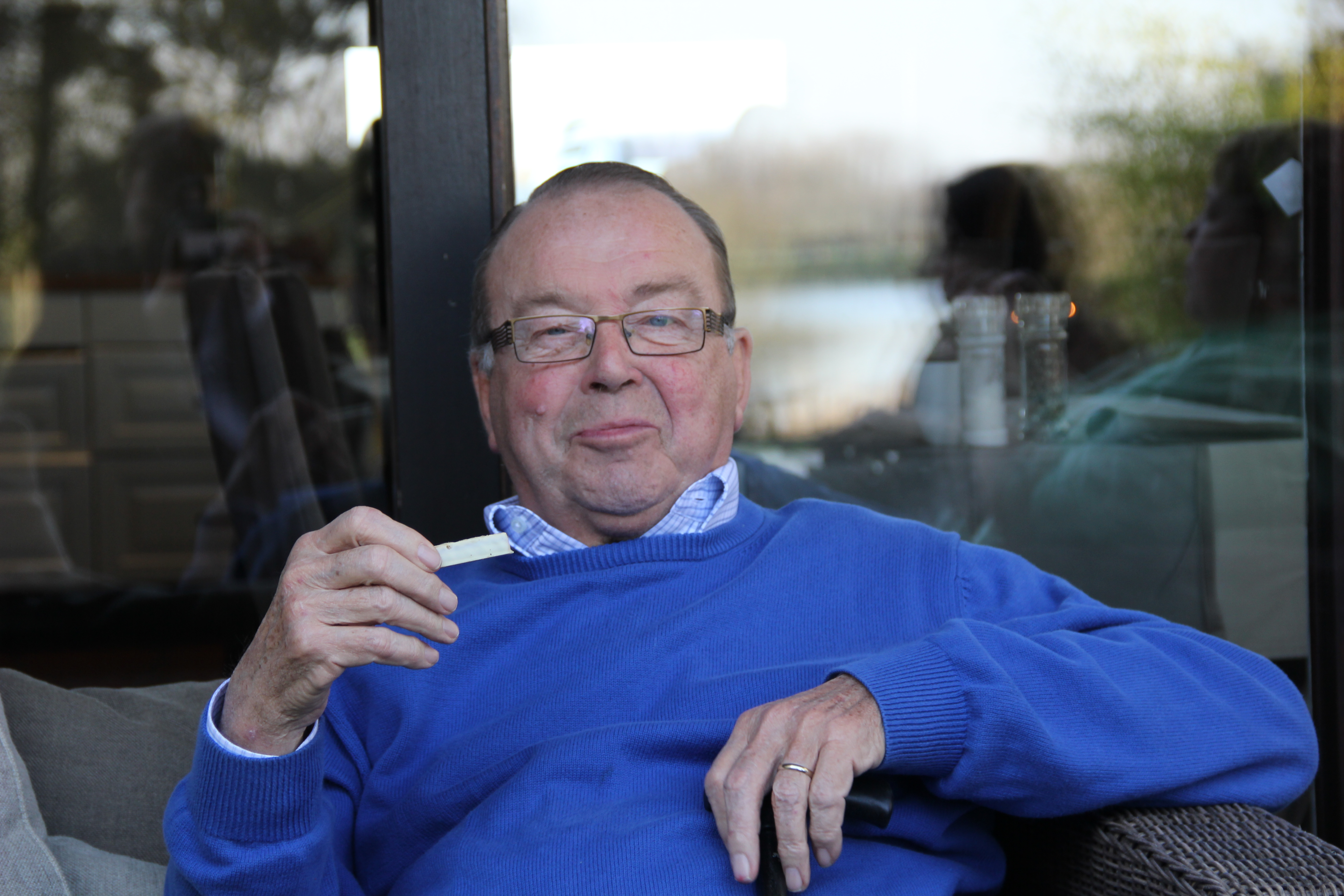
Marc Olivier (2014)

Marc Olivier (30 June 1940 – 15 December 2018) was a Belgian politician.

He was a member of the Christian Social Party and its successor, the Christen-Democratisch en Vlaams. Olivier served on the Chamber of Representatives between 1974 and 1995, after which he was elected to the Flemish Council through 1999. Olivier sat on the Kortrijk municipal council from 1977 to 1994.
