= Phineas Makhurane =

Zimbabwean academic and physicist (1939–2018)

- Born: 13 January 1939
- Died: 1 December 2018 (aged 79)
- Education: University of Rhodesia and Nyasaland (physics and mathematics); University of Sheffield (PhD, solid-state physics)
- Known for: Founding Vice-Chancellor of NUST; higher education reform; industrial attachment programmes
- Scientific career
- Fields: Physics, higher education
- Workplaces: University of Zimbabwe; National University of Science and Technology, Zimbabwe; University of Zambia; University of Botswana; National University of Lesotho; University of Swaziland

Phineas Makhurane (13 January 1939 – 1 December 2018) was a Zimbabwean academic, physicist, and university administrator. He was the founding Vice-Chancellor of the National University of Science and Technology, Zimbabwe (1991–2004), a former Pro-Vice-Chancellor of the University of Zimbabwe, and later chairman and founding chief executive of the National Council for Higher Education.

== Early life and education ==
Makhurane was among the first Black Zimbabweans to study physics and mathematics at the University of Rhodesia and Nyasaland and later obtained a doctorate in solid-state physics from the University of Sheffield.

== Academic and regional career ==
He began his career at the University of Zimbabwe, where he rose to Pro-Vice-Chancellor. He also held academic and administrative roles at the University of Zambia, University of Botswana, National University of Lesotho, and the University of Swaziland.

During the 1970s, he worked with the International University Exchange Fund (IUEF) in Zambia and Botswana, supporting access to education for refugees and political detainees during the liberation struggles in southern Africa.

== Vice-Chancellor of NUST ==
Makhurane served as the founding Vice-Chancellor of the National University of Science and Technology, Zimbabwe from 1991 to 2004, leading its establishment as Zimbabwe’s first university dedicated to science and technology education.

He proposed and developed structured industrial attachment programmes, replacing traditional vacation training with assessed workplace experience, a model later adopted across southern Africa.

== Higher education policy ==
After retiring from NUST, he served as a technical advisor in the Office of the President and contributed to the creation of Zimbabwe’s higher education regulatory framework.

He became the founding chief executive and later chairman of the National Council for Higher Education, helping shape accreditation systems and institutional standards.

He also held leadership roles in several bodies, including the African Virtual University, the Zimbabwe School Examinations Council (ZIMSEC), the Zimbabwe Institute of Public Administration and Management (ZIPAM), and the Scientific and Industrial Research and Development Centre (SIRDC).

== Honours and recognition ==
Makhurane was awarded the Order of the Star of Zimbabwe (Silver Medal) and was declared a national hero.

He also received the Presidential Certificate of Distinction and was elected a fellow of both the Zimbabwe Academy of Sciences and the Zimbabwe Institution of Engineers. He was awarded several honorary doctorates, including Doctor of Laws (University of Zimbabwe), Doctor of Education (Midlands State University), and Doctor of Science (NUST).

== Publications ==
Makhurane published work in solid-state physics and authored an autobiography, Phinias-Mogorosi Makhurane – An Autobiography (2010).

== Death and legacy ==
Makhurane retired in 2004 and died on 1 December 2018 at Mater Dei Hospital in Bulawayo after a prolonged illness.

He is regarded as a key figure in the development of science and higher education in Zimbabwe, particularly for founding NUST and advancing industrial attachment programmes.
