= Willy Taminiaux =

Belgian politician

Mayor of La Louvière
- In office 2000–2006
- Succeeded by: Jacques Gobert

Councillor of La Louvière
- In office 1989–2006

Senator
- In office 1985–1995

Personal details
- Born: 17 December 1939 Écaussinnes, Belgium
- Died: 22 December 2018 (aged 79)
- Party: Socialist
- Occupation: Politician

Willy Taminiaux (17 December 1939 – 22 December 2018) was a Belgian Socialist politician.

== Biography ==
Having started his career as a schoolteacher, Willy Taminiaux entered politics, eventually becoming a leading figure in the Walloon Parti Socialiste.

He sat in the Belgian Senate from 1985 to 1992, and in the Parliament of Wallonia from 1995 until 2001, and served as Minister of Social Affairs, Housing and Health in the Walloon Government from 1994 to 1999. In the last capacity he drafted an executive order furthering the integration of handicapped people into society in 1995. In 1999 he became speaker of the Walloon Parliament.

He was also active in local politics, and became mayor of La Louvière in 2000. He did not run again in the 2006 elections.

He has served as President of the Union of Cities and Municipalities of Wallonia, President of the Union of Belgian Cities and Municipalities (CCRE), and a member of the Executive Committee of United Cities and Local Governments.
