= 2018 in film =

2018 in film is an overview of events, including the highest-grossing films, award ceremonies, critics' lists of the best films of 2018, festivals, a list of films released, and notable deaths.

== Evaluation of the year ==
Richard Brody of The New Yorker said,

2018 has been a banner year for movies, but you'd never know it from a trip to a local multiplex—or from a glimpse at the Oscarizables. The gap between what's good and what's widely available in theatres—between the cinema of resistance and the cinema of consensus—is wider than ever.

He also stated,

In some cases, streaming has filled the gap. Several of the year's best movies, such Shirkers and The Ballad of Buster Scruggs, are being released by Netflix at the same time as (or just after) a limited theatrical run. Others, which barely qualified as having theatrical releases (one theatre for a week), are now available to stream online, on demand, and are more widely accessible to viewers (albeit at home) than films playing at thousands of multiplexes. Yet an impermanence, a threat of disappearance with the flick of a switch, hangs threateningly over independent films that are sent out on streaming.

== Highest-grossing films ==
The top films released in 2018 by worldwide gross are as follows:

Highest-grossing films of 2018
Rank	Title	Distributor	Worldwide gross
1	Avengers: Infinity War	Disney	$2,048,359,754
2	Black Panther	Disney	$1,347,597,973
3	Jurassic World: Fallen Kingdom	Universal	$1,308,467,944
4	Incredibles 2	Disney	$1,242,805,359
5	Aquaman	Warner Bros.	$1,148,528,393
6	Bohemian Rhapsody	20th Century Fox	$911,027,169
7	Venom	Sony	$856,085,151
8	Mission: Impossible – Fallout	Paramount	$791,115,104
9	Deadpool 2	20th Century Fox	$785,896,609
10	Fantastic Beasts: The Crimes of Grindelwald	Warner Bros.	$654,855,901

Avengers: Infinity War grossed $2 billion worldwide, becoming the fourth movie to surpass the milestone, and 4th highest-grossing film of all time. Black Panther, Jurassic World: Fallen Kingdom, Incredibles 2, and Aquaman have each grossed over $1 billion, making them among the highest-grossing films of all time, with Incredibles 2 becoming the 2nd highest-grossing animated film of all time.

=== 2018 box office records ===
- The Marvel Cinematic Universe became the first film franchise to gross more than $14 billion with the release of Black Panther, and the first franchise to release five billion-dollar-grossing films (with Black Panther joining The Avengers, Iron Man 3, Avengers: Age of Ultron, and Captain America: Civil War). Two months later, the MCU became the first film franchise to gross more than $15 billion and $16 billion with the release of Avengers: Infinity War, which became the sixth billion-dollar-grossing film in the franchise, and also the first film in the franchise to earn $2 billion; and the MCU also became the first film franchise with two billion-dollar-grossing films released in the same year (with Black Panther and Avengers: Infinity War). Two months after that, the MCU became the first film franchise to gross over $17 billion with the release of Ant-Man and the Wasp.
- China set an all-time biggest global one-month record in February with CN¥10.14 billion ($1.6 billion), calculating revenues from both local and foreign films. The record breaking number was largely attributed to the Lunar New Year holiday. The previous global monthly box office record was set in July 2011 in North America with $1.395 billion and the previous highest-grossing month in China was August 2017 with CN¥7.38 billion ($1.17 billion). The highest-grossing films in China during the month were the domestic films Operation Red Sea, Monster Hunt 2, and Detective Chinatown 2, and the Indian film Secret Superstar.
- For the first time in history, February recorded $1 billion ticket sales in North America, fueled largely by the success of Disney/Marvel's Black Panther which represented 43% or $428.8 million of the entire month's ticket sales. The previous February record was in 2012 with $818.4 million.
- In China, the combined opening weekend numbers of Monster Hunt 2 ($190 million), Detective Chinatown 2 ($154 million), The Monkey King 3 ($79.9 million), Operation Red Sea ($70.3 million) and Boonie Bears: The Big Shrink ($40.9 million) amounted to a record breaking CN¥3.21 billion ($506 million) or $543 million weekend with online ticket sales, which is more than double the feat achieved in 2017 ($205 million) and 2016 ($224 million) during the same time period. The previous weekend record was set in North America during the weekend of December 18–20, 2017, when the combined grosses of several films resulted in $306 million led by Star Wars: The Force Awakens' $248 million debut.
- The same weekend, China also set a new IMAX opening record when the combined IMAX earnings of the three films recorded $15.1 million, led by Monster Hunt 2 and Detective Chinatown 2 ($6.7 million).
- During the first quarter of 2018, China overtook North America as the world's largest box office market for the first time, with China grossing $3.17 billion compared to North America's $2.89 billion during that quarter. Despite declining revenue from Hollywood films, Chinese box office growth was driven primarily by domestic Chinese films, led by Operation Red Sea and Detective Chinatown 2, along with non-Hollywood foreign films, led by Indian Bollywood films Secret Superstar and Bajrangi Bhaijaan.

==== Studio records ====
- Walt Disney Studios became the fastest studio ever to reach $1 billion for the year at the domestic box office; it reached this goal in 117 days on April 27, 2018, beating its own record of 128 days set on May 7, 2016.
  - Walt Disney Studios also grossed over $7 billion worldwide and $3 billion domestic, making it its 2nd time after 2016. It passed Disney's 2016 domestic gross and it's in 2nd place this year.
- With Incredibles 2, Pixar became the first animation studio to have three animated films (Toy Story 3, Finding Dory) each surpass $1 billion at the worldwide box office.

==== Film records ====
- Black Panther grossed $202 million in its opening weekend and $242.16 million over the four-day holiday weekend, breaking the record for a February opening weekend and a Presidents' Day weekend, surpassing Deadpool ($132.4 million and $152.2 million in 2016), and recording the biggest opening weekend and total for a film directed by a black filmmaker, surpassing The Fate of the Furious ($98.8 million by F. Gary Gray in 2017). It also became just the fifth movie ever to gross more than $200 million domestically in its opening weekend (joining The Avengers, Jurassic World, Star Wars: The Force Awakens, and Star Wars: The Last Jedi). On Monday, February 19, the film grossed another $40.17 million, breaking the record for a Monday gross and surpassing Force Awakens ($40.11 million on December 21, 2015). The subsequent $242.16 million four-day opening weekend became the second-biggest four-day gross ever, only behind The Force Awakens' $288.07 million. On February 23–25, the film grossed another $111.7 million, recording the second-biggest second weekend gross behind The Force Awakens ($149.2 million on December 25–27, 2015) and becoming just the fourth film to gross more than $100 million in its second weekend (joining The Avengers, Jurassic World, and The Force Awakens). On February 27, the film became the first superhero origin film and the tenth film overall to gross $500 million domestically (doing so in 17 days, the third fastest film to reach the milestone behind The Force Awakens and The Last Jedi), surpassing Wonder Woman ($412.6 million in 2017) to become the highest-grossing single character superhero origin film; on March 9, the film reached $549.2 million domestically, surpassing The Dark Knight to become the highest grossing solo superhero film of all time. On March 16, the film became the seventh film to gross $600 million domestically (doing so in 31 days, the second fastest film to reach the milestone behind The Force Awakens), and just the second superhero movie to do so (along with Avengers). On March 24, the film reached a total domestic gross of $626 million to become the highest grossing superhero movie of all time, surpassing The Avengers ($623.4 million in 2012). On March 30, the film became the fifth film to gross $650 million domestically (doing so in 45 days, the second fastest film to reach the milestone behind Force Awakens). On April 7, it reached a total domestic gross of $663.2 million to surpass Titanic as the third-highest-grossing film in the United States and Canada. On August 3, it reached a total domestic gross of $700 million, becoming the third film to reach the mark.
- Black Panther also became the highest-grossing film of all time in West and East Africa, and the southern Africa region.
- On March 9–12, Ryan Coogler's Black Panther retained the #1 box office spot with a $40.8 million fourth weekend (the fourth biggest, behind American Sniper, Avatar, and The Force Awakens), while Ava DuVernay's A Wrinkle in Time opened at the #2 spot with a $33.1 million debut, marking the first time in history that the top two spots of a weekend were both held by black directors.
- Avengers: Infinity War grossed $258 million in its opening weekend, breaking the record for biggest domestic opening weekend and surpassing The Force Awakens ($248 million in 2015). The film grossed $641 million worldwide opening weekend, becoming the first film ever to open with more than $600 million globally and surpassing The Fate of the Furious ($542 million in 2017). On April 27, the film grossed $106 million in its opening day, the second-highest single day gross behind The Force Awakens ($119 million in 2015) to become just the third movie ever to gross more than $100 million in a single day (joining The Force Awakens and The Last Jedi); on April 28, the film grossed another $83 million, breaking the record for a Saturday gross and surpassing Jurassic World ($69.6 million on 13 June 2015); on April 29, the film grossed another $69.2 million, breaking the record for a Sunday gross and surpassing The Force Awakens ($60.5 million on 20 December 2015). The film became the second film of the decade to gross $2 billion, making the 2010s the first decade to have two films gross $2 billion.
- Bohemian Rhapsody, based on the life of Queen's lead vocalist Freddie Mercury, grossed over $911 million worldwide, setting all-time records for the highest-grossing biopic ever (surpassing Mel Gibson's The Passion of the Christ, at $611 million), the highest-grossing musical biopic, and the highest-grossing drama film (without any action or fantasy).
- Secret Superstar, an Indian musical drama film that had its China release in January 2018, grossed $29.2 million in its opening weekend there, setting a record for an Indian film in China, surpassing Dangal; Bollywood superstar Aamir Khan produced and starred in both films. Secret Superstar's first-week gross in China was $47 million, also a record for an Indian film in the country, again surpassing Dangal. Secret Superstar was the fourth highest-grossing foreign film in China during January–April 2018. Secret Superstar also became one of the most profitable films of all time, grossing ₹9.65 billion ($154 million) worldwide on a limited budget of ₹150 million (US$1.6 million), with over 6,000% return on investment (ROI).
- Incredibles 2 grossed $182.7 million domestically and $235.8 million worldwide in its opening weekend, setting records for the biggest domestic opening weekend for both Pixar and any animated film (surpassing Finding Dory, with $135.1 million in 2016), the biggest worldwide opening for Pixar (surpassing Finding Dory), and the biggest opening weekend worldwide for an animated film (surpassing Ice Age: Dawn of the Dinosaurs, with $218.4 million in 2009). It also set the record for the biggest opening for a PG rated movie (surpassing Beauty and the Beast with $174.8 million in 2017). It became the first animated film to earn $500 million at the domestic box office, later the first animated film to earn $600 million at the domestic box office, earning just over $602 million and surpassing the previous record set by Finding Dory by over $100 million. It is also the fastest animated film to gross $1 billion worldwide doing so in 46 days, surpassing Minions (49 days).

== Events ==
=== Award ceremonies ===
Date	Event	Host	Location	Ref
January 7	75th Golden Globe Awards	Hollywood Foreign Press Association	Beverly Hills, California, U.S.	
January 11	23rd Critics' Choice Awards	Broadcast Film Critics Association	Santa Monica, California, U.S.	
January 13	23rd Forqué Awards	EGEDA	Zaragoza, Spain	
January 20	63rd Filmfare Awards	The Times Group	Mumbai, India	
January 20	Producers Guild of America Awards 2017	Producers Guild of America	Beverly Hills, California, U.S.	
January 21	24th Screen Actors Guild Awards	SAG-AFTRA	Los Angeles, California, U.S.	
January 22	53rd Guldbagge Awards	Swedish Film Institute	Djurgården, Sweden	
February 2	26th Movieguide Awards Gala	Movieguide	Los Angeles, California, U.S.	
February 3	45th Annie Awards	ASIFA-Hollywood	Los Angeles, California, U.S.	
February 3	32nd Goya Awards	Academia de las Artes y las Ciencias Cinematográficas de España	Madrid, Spain	
February 3	8th Magritte Awards	Académie André Delvaux	Brussels, Belgium	
February 3	70th Directors Guild of America Awards	Directors Guild of America	Los Angeles, California, U.S.	
February 5	23rd Lumière Awards	Académie des Lumières	Paris, France	
February 11	22nd Satellite Awards	International Press Academy	Century City, Los Angeles	
February 11	Writers Guild of America Awards 2017	Writers Guild of America, East & Writers Guild of America, West	Manhattan, New York, U.S. and Los Angeles, California, U.S.	
February 18	71st British Academy Film Awards	British Academy of Film and Television Arts	London, England, UK	
March 2	43rd César Awards	French Academy of Cinema Arts and Techniques	Paris, France	
March 3	33rd Independent Spirit Awards	Independent Spirit Awards	Santa Monica, California, U.S.	
March 3	38th Golden Raspberry Awards	Golden Raspberry Awards	Hollywood, California, U.S.	
March 4	90th Academy Awards	Academy of Motion Picture Arts and Sciences	Hollywood, California, U.S.	
March 7	2017 Dorian Awards Winners Toast	GALECA: The Society of LGBTQ Entertainment Critics	Los Angeles, California, U.S.	
March 24	31st Kids' Choice Awards	Nickelodeon	Los Angeles, California, U.S.	
April 20	20th Meril Prothom Alo Awards	Prothom Alo	Dhaka, Bangladesh	
April 29	5th Platino Awards	EGEDA & FIPCA	Riviera Maya, Mexico	
June 5	60th Ariel Awards	Academia Mexicana de Artes y Ciencias Cinematográficas	Mexico City, Mexico	
June 18	2018 MTV Movie & TV Awards	MTV	Los Angeles, California, U.S.	
June 27	44th Saturn Awards	Academy of Science Fiction, Fantasy and Horror Films	Burbank, California, U.S.	

=== Festivals ===
List of some of the film festivals for 2018 that have been accredited by the International Federation of Film Producers Associations (FIAPF).

Date	Event	Host	Location	Source
January 18–28	2018 Sundance Film Festival	Sundance Institute	Park City, Utah, United States	
February 15–25	68th Berlin International Film Festival	Berlin International Film Festival	Berlin, Germany	
May 8–19	2018 Cannes Film Festival	Cannes Film Festival	Cannes, France	
August 29 – September 8	75th Venice International Film Festival	Venice Film Festival	Venice, Italy	
September 6–16	2018 Toronto International Film Festival	Toronto International Film Festival	Toronto, Ontario, Canada	
September 21–29	66th San Sebastián International Film Festival	San Sebastián International Film Festival	San Sebastián, Spain	

== Awards ==
Category/Organization	76th Golden Globe Awards January 6, 2019		24th Critics' Choice Awards January 13, 2019	Producers, Directors, Screen Actors, and Writers Guild Awards January 19–February 17, 2019	72nd BAFTA Awards February 10, 2019	91st Academy Awards February 24, 2019
Category/Organization	Drama	Musical or Comedy	24th Critics' Choice Awards January 13, 2019	Producers, Directors, Screen Actors, and Writers Guild Awards January 19–February 17, 2019	72nd BAFTA Awards February 10, 2019	91st Academy Awards February 24, 2019
Best Film	Bohemian Rhapsody	Green Book	Roma	Green Book	Roma	Green Book
Best Director	Alfonso Cuarón; Roma					
Best Actor	Rami Malek; Bohemian Rhapsody	Christian Bale; Vice		Rami Malek; Bohemian Rhapsody		
Best Actress	Glenn Close; The Wife	Olivia Colman; The Favourite	Glenn Close; The Wife (tie); Lady Gaga; A Star Is Born (tie)	Glenn Close; The Wife	Olivia Colman; The Favourite	
Best Supporting Actor	Mahershala Ali; Green Book					
Best Supporting Actress	Regina King; If Beale Street Could Talk			Emily Blunt; A Quiet Place	Rachel Weisz; The Favourite	Regina King; If Beale Street Could Talk
Best Screenplay, Adapted	Brian Currie, Peter Farrelly, and Nick Vallelonga; Green Book		Barry Jenkins; If Beale Street Could Talk	Nicole Holofcener and Jeff Whitty; Can You Ever Forgive Me?	Spike Lee, David Rabinowitz, Charlie Wachtel and Kevin Willmott; BlacKkKlansman	
Best Screenplay, Original	Brian Currie, Peter Farrelly, and Nick Vallelonga; Green Book		Paul Schrader; First Reformed	Bo Burnham; Eighth Grade	Deborah Davis and Tony McNamara; The Favourite	Brian Currie, Peter Farrelly, and Nick Vallelonga; Green Book
Best Animated Film	Spider-Man: Into the Spider-Verse					
Best Original Score	Justin Hurwitz; First Man			—N/a	Bradley Cooper, Lady Gaga and Lukas Nelson; A Star Is Born	Ludwig Göransson; Black Panther
Best Original Song	"Shallow"; A Star Is Born			—N/a	—N/a	"Shallow"; A Star Is Born
Best Foreign Language Film	Roma			—N/a	Roma	
Best Documentary (Note: From 2016 onward, the category was shifted from the Critics' Choice Awards to the ancillary Critics' Choice Documentary Awards.)	—N/a	—N/a	Won't You Be My Neighbor?		Free Solo	

Palme d'Or (71st Cannes Film Festival):

Shoplifters (万引き家族), directed by Hirokazu Kore-eda, Japan

Golden Lion (75th Venice International Film Festival):

Roma, directed by Alfonso Cuarón, Mexico

Golden Bear (68th Berlin International Film Festival):

Touch Me Not (Nu mă atinge-mă), directed by Adina Pintilie, Romania

== 2018 films ==
=== By country/region ===
- List of American films of 2018
- List of Australian films of 2018
- List of Bangladeshi films of 2018
- List of Brazilian films of 2018
- List of British films of 2018
- List of Chinese films of 2018
- List of French films of 2018
- List of Hong Kong films of 2018
- List of Indian films of 2018
  - List of Assamese films of 2018
  - List of Bengali films of 2018
  - List of Gujarati films of 2018
  - List of Hindi films of 2018
  - List of Kannada films of 2018
  - List of Malayalam films of 2018
  - List of Marathi films of 2018
  - List of Odia films of 2018
  - List of Punjabi films of 2018
  - List of Tamil films of 2018
  - List of Telugu films of 2018
  - List of Tulu films of 2018
- List of Indonesian films
- List of Japanese films of 2018
- List of Pakistani films of 2018
- List of Portuguese films of 2018
- List of Russian films of 2018
- List of South Korean films of 2018
- List of Spanish films of 2018
- List of Turkish films of 2018

=== By genre/medium ===
- List of action films of 2018
- List of animated feature films of 2018
- List of avant-garde films of 2018
- List of comedy films of 2018
- List of drama films of 2018
- List of horror films of 2018
- List of science fiction films of 2018
- List of thriller films of 2018
- List of western films of 2018

== Deaths ==
Month	Date	Name	Age	Country	Profession	Notable films
January	1	Jon Paul Steuer	33	US	Actor	Late for Dinner; Little Giants
January	5	Jerry Van Dyke	86	US	Actor	McLintock!; Angel in My Pocket
January	8	Donnelly Rhodes	80	Canada	Actor	Butch Cassidy and the Sundance Kid; Tron: Legacy
January	9	Terence Marsh	86	UK	Production Designer	Doctor Zhivago; Oliver!
January	13	Jean Porter	95	US	Actress	Abbott and Costello in Hollywood; Cry Danger
January	14	Hugh Wilson	74	US	Director, Screenwriter	Police Academy; The First Wives Club
January	14	Yosuke Natsuki	81	Japan	Actor	Dogora; The Return of Godzilla
January	15	Peter Wyngarde	90	UK	Actor	Flash Gordon; The Innocents
January	16	Bradford Dillman	87	US	Actor	The Way We Were; The Enforcer
January	19	Anna Campori	100	Italy	Actress	Venice, the Moon and You; Neapolitan Turk
January	19	Olivia Cole	75	US	Actress	Coming Home; First Sunday
January	19	Dorothy Malone	93	US	Actress	Written on the Wind; Basic Instinct
January	19	Allison Shearmur	54	US	Producer, Executive	The Hunger Games; Cinderella
January	21	Connie Sawyer	105	US	Actress	Dumb and Dumber; When Harry Met Sally...
January	23	Ezra Swerdlow	64	US	Producer	Wag the Dog; 21 Jump Street
January	25	John Morris	91	US	Composer	The Elephant Man; Young Frankenstein
January	30	Louis Zorich	93	US	Actor	Fiddler on the Roof; Dirty Rotten Scoundrels
January	31	Ann Gillis	90	US	Actress	The Adventures of Tom Sawyer; 2001: A Space Odyssey
January	31	Alf Humphreys	64	Canada	Actor	My Bloody Valentine; First Blood
February	1	Reyes Abades	68	Spain	Special Effects Artist	The Day of the Beast; Pan's Labyrinth
February	3	Rolf Zacher	76	Germany	Actor	We Free Kings; Jew Suss: Rise and Fall
February	4	Kenneth Haigh	86	UK	Actor	Cleopatra; Robin and Marian
February	4	John Mahoney	77	UK	Actor	Moonstruck; Barton Fink
February	7	Mickey Jones	76	US	Actor	National Lampoon's Vacation; Starman
February	7	Jill Messick	50	US	Producer	Frida; Mean Girls
February	9	Reg E. Cathey	59	US	Actor	Fantastic Four; The Mask
February	9	John Gavin	86	US	Actor	Imitation of Life; Psycho
February	9	Jóhann Jóhannsson	48	Iceland	Composer	The Theory of Everything; Arrival
February	11	Vic Damone	89	US	Singer, Actor	Hit the Deck; Kismet
February	12	Louise Latham	95	US	Actress	Marnie; The Sugarland Express
February	13	Edward M. Abroms	82	US	Film Editor	Blue Thunder; The Sugarland Express
February	15	Pier Paolo Capponi	79	Italy	Actor	The Cat o' Nine Tails; Many Wars Ago
February	18	Idrissa Ouedraogo	64	Burkina Faso	Director, Screenwriter	Tilaï; Kini and Adams
February	21	Emma Chambers	53	UK	Actress	Notting Hill; The Clandestine Marriage
February	21	Ren Osugi	66	Japan	Actor	Dolls; Getting Any?
February	22	Nanette Fabray	97	US	Actress	The Band Wagon; Harper Valley PTA
February	23	James Colby	56	US	Actor	Patriots Day; Tower Heist
February	23	Lewis Gilbert	97	UK	Director, Screenwriter	Alfie; You Only Live Twice
February	24	Bud Luckey	83	US	Animator, Voice Actor	Toy Story; The Incredibles
February	24	Sridevi	54	India	Actress	Chandni; Mr. India
February	26	Paul De Meo	64	US	Screenwriter	The Rocketeer; Da 5 Bloods
February	26	Benjamin Melniker	104	US	Producer	Batman; The Dark Knight
March	3	Frank Doubleday	73	US	Actor	Escape from New York; Assault on Precinct 13
March	3	David Ogden Stiers	75	US	Actor	Beauty and the Beast; Mighty Aphrodite
March	5	André S. Labarthe	86	France	Actor	Vivre sa vie; L'Amour fou
March	6	Donna Butterworth	62	US	Actress	Paradise, Hawaiian Style; The Family Jewels
March	11	Siegfried Rauch	85	Germany	Actor	Patton; Le Mans
March	12	Oleg Tabakov	82	Russia	Actor	Dark Eyes; Moscow Does Not Believe in Tears
March	17	Geneviève Fontanel	81	France	Actress	The Man Who Loved Women; Madame Rosa
March	22	Morgana King	87	US	Actress, Singer	The Godfather; The Godfather Part II
March	23	Delores Taylor	85	US	Actress, Screenwriter, Producer	Billy Jack; The Born Losers
March	24	Debbie Lee Carrington	58	US	Actress	Return of the Jedi; Total Recall
March	27	Stéphane Audran	85	France	Actress	The Discreet Charm of the Bourgeoisie; Babette's Feast
March	30	Bill Maynard	89	UK	Actor	Bless This House; Robin and Marian
March	31	Luigi De Filippo	87	Italy	Actor	The Four Days of Naples; In the Name of the Sovereign People
April	2	Susan Anspach	75	US	Actress	Five Easy Pieces; Play It Again, Sam
April	3	Mary Hatcher	88	US	Actress	The Big Wheel; Holiday in Havana
April	4	Soon-Tek Oh	85	Korea	Actor	Mulan; The Man with the Golden Gun
April	5	Isao Takahata	82	Japan	Director, Screenwriter	The Tale of the Princess Kaguya; Grave of the Fireflies
April	8	Chuck McCann	83	US	Actor, Voice Actor	The Heart Is a Lonely Hunter; C.H.O.M.P.S.
April	13	Miloš Forman	86	Czech Republic	Director	Amadeus; One Flew Over the Cuckoo's Nest
April	14	Isabella Biagini	74	Italy	Actress	Loaded Guns; Slalom
April	15	Philip D'Antoni	89	US	Producer, Director	The French Connection; The Seven-Ups
April	15	R. Lee Ermey	74	US	Actor	Full Metal Jacket; Toy Story
April	15	Vittorio Taviani	88	Italy	Director, Screenwriter	Caesar Must Die; Padre Padrone
April	16	Pamela Gidley	52	US	Actress	Thrashin'; Twin Peaks: Fire Walk with Me
April	20	John Stride	81	UK	Actor	A Bridge Too Far; Macbeth
April	21	Verne Troyer	49	US	Actor	Austin Powers; The Imaginarium of Doctor Parnassus
April	23	Arthur B. Rubinstein	80	US	Composer	Blue Thunder; Stakeout
April	25	Michael Anderson	98	UK	Director	Around the World in 80 Days; Logan's Run
April	26	Gianfranco Parolini	93	Italy	Director	Sabata; God's Gun
April	27	Paul Junger Witt	77	US	Producer	Dead Poets Society; Insomnia
April	28	Lester James Peries	99	Sri Lanka	Director, Screenwriter	Gamperaliya; Nidhanaya
April	29	Robert Mandan	86	US	Actor	The Carey Treatment; MacArthur
May	5	Ermanno Olmi	86	Italy	Director, Screenwriter	The Tree of Wooden Clogs; Il Posto
May	8	Anne V. Coates	92	UK	Film Editor	Lawrence of Arabia; The Elephant Man
May	11	Josh Greenfeld	90	US	Screenwriter	Harry and Tonto; Oh, God! Book II
May	12	Kevin Tierney	67	Canada	Producer, Screenwriter	Bon Cop, Bad Cop; The Trotsky
May	13	Margot Kidder	69	Canada	Actress	Superman; The Amityville Horror
May	16	Joseph Campanella	93	US	Actor	The Young Lovers; The St. Valentine's Day Massacre
May	16	Hugh Dane	75	US	Actor	Bridesmaids; Joy Ride
May	16	Lucian Pintilie	84	Romania	Director, Screenwriter	An Unforgettable Summer; The Reenactment
May	19	Vincent McEveety	88	US	Director	Firecreek; The Castaway Cowboy
May	20	Bill Gold	97	US	Graphic Designer	Casablanca; The Exorcist
May	20	Patricia Morison	103	US	Actress, Singer	The Song of Bernadette; Calling Dr. Death
May	21	Anna Maria Ferrero	84	Italy	Actress	War and Peace; The Four Days of Naples
May	21	Allyn Ann McLerie	91	US	Actress	Calamity Jane; They Shoot Horses, Don't They?
May	21	Clint Walker	90	US	Actor	Fort Dobbs; The Dirty Dozen
May	22	Elizabeth Sung	63	Hong Kong	Actress	The Joy Luck Club; Memoirs of a Geisha
May	24	Jerry Maren	98	US	Actor	The Wizard of Oz; Little Cigars
May	31	Michael D. Ford	90	UK	Set Decorator	Raiders of the Lost Ark; Titanic
June	1	William Edward Phipps	96	US	Actor	Cinderella; Invaders from Mars
June	6	Kira Muratova	83	Ukraine	Director, Screenwriter	The Asthenic Syndrome; Three Stories
June	8	Eunice Gayson	90	UK	Actress	Dr. No; From Russia with Love
June	9	Françoise Bonnot	78	France	Film Editor	Z; Missing
June	9	Zhang Junzhao	65	China	Director, Screenwriter	One and Eight; Arc Light
June	11	Roman Kłosowski	89	Poland	Actor	Man on the Tracks; Shadow
June	16	Martin Bregman	92	US	Producer	Scarface; Dog Day Afternoon
June	16	Richard Greenberg	71	US	Visual Effects Artist, Title Designer, Director	Predator; Last Action Hero
June	18	Maria Rohm	72	Austria	Actress	Ten Little Indians; Count Dracula
June	22	Deanna Lund	81	US	Actress	Dimension 5; Hardly Working
June	24	Stanley Anderson	78	US	Actor	Spider-Man; Armageddon
June	27	Steven Hilliard Stern	80	Canada	Director, Screenwriter	Running; The Devil and Max Devlin
June	28	Denis Akiyama	66	Canada	Actor	Johnny Mnemonic; Pixels
June	29	Liliane Montevecchi	85	France	Actress, Singer	The Sad Sack; The Young Lions
June	29	Derrick O'Connor	77	Ireland	Actor	Lethal Weapon 2; Brazil
June	29	Anthony Ray	80	US	Producer	An Unmarried Woman; Freebie and the Bean
July	1	Gillian Lynne	92	UK	Choreographer	Yentl; Man of La Mancha
July	4	Robby Müller	78	Netherlands	Cinematographer	Paris, Texas; Dead Man
July	5	Claude Lanzmann	92	France	Documentarian	Shoah; Sobibór, October 14, 1943, 4 p.m.
July	8	Tab Hunter	86	US	Actor, Singer	That Kind of Woman; Damn Yankees
July	8	Alan Johnson	81	US	Director, Choreographer	To Be or Not to Be; Solarbabies
July	8	Carlo Vanzina	67	Italy	Director, Screenwriter	Vacanze di Natale; Time for Loving
July	12	Roger Perry	85	US	Actor	Count Yorga, Vampire; The Thing with Two Heads
July	12	Robert Wolders	81	Netherlands	Actor	Tobruk; Beau Geste
July	13	Stan Dragoti	85	US	Director	Mr. Mom; Love at First Bite
July	17	Gary Beach	70	US	Actor	The Producers; Defending Your Life
July	17	Yvonne Blake	78	UK	Costume Designer	Nicholas and Alexandra; Superman
July	17	David Stevens	77	Australia	Screenwriter	Breaker Morant; The Sum of Us
July	18	Hugh Whitemore	82	UK	Screenwriter	The Blue Bird; The Return of the Soldier
July	19	Shinobu Hashimoto	100	Japan	Screenwriter	Seven Samurai; Rashomon
July	19	Michael Howells	61	UK	Production Designer	Emma; Nanny McPhee
July	23	Harry Gulkin	90	Canada	Producer	Lies My Father Told Me; Two Solitudes
July	25	Patrick Williams	79	US	Composer	Breaking Away; Cry-Baby
July	27	Bernard Hepton	92	UK	Actor	Get Carter; Barry Lyndon
August	1	Mary Carlisle	104	US	Actress	College Humor; The Sweetheart of Sigma Chi
August	2	Winston Ntshona	76	South Africa	Actor	A Dry White Season; The Wild Geese
August	3	Moshé Mizrahi	86	Israel	Director	Madame Rosa; Every Time We Say Goodbye
August	3	Ronnie Taylor	93	UK	Cinematographer	Gandhi; Sea of Love
August	5	Charlotte Rae	92	US	Actress	Bananas; Ricki and the Flash
August	5	Beverly Polcyn	90	US	Actress	Not Another Teen Movie; Hook
August	5	Piotr Szulkin	68	Poland	Director	O-Bi, O-Ba: The End of Civilization; The War of the Worlds: Next Century
August	7	Étienne Chicot	69	France	Actor	The Da Vinci Code; TransSiberian
August	7	Richard H. Kline	91	US	Cinematographer	Star Trek: The Motion Picture; King Kong
August	13	John Carter	95	US	Film Editor	Lean on Me; Taking Off
August	13	Unshō Ishizuka	67	Japan	Voice Actor	Cowboy Bebop: The Movie; Redline
August	16	Aretha Franklin	76	US	Singer, Actress	The Blues Brothers; Blues Brothers 2000
August	20	Craig Zadan	69	US	Producer	Footloose; Chicago
August	20	Brian Murray	80	South Africa	Actor	Treasure Planet; Dream House
August	21	Barbara Harris	83	US	Actress	Nashville; Freaky Friday
August	24	Lindsay Kemp	80	UK	Actor	The Wicker Man; Velvet Goldmine
August	26	Neil Simon	91	US	Screenwriter	The Odd Couple; The Sunshine Boys
August	27	Robert H. Solo	85	US	Producer	Invasion of the Body Snatchers; Colors
August	27	Fredd Wayne	93	US	Actor	The Spiral Road; Man on the Moon
August	30	Vanessa Marquez	49	US	Actress	Stand and Deliver; Twenty Bucks
August	31	Gloria Jean	92	US	Actress, Singer	Never Give a Sucker an Even Break; Copacabana
August	31	Carole Shelley	79	UK	Actress	The Odd Couple; Robin Hood
September	3	Lydia Clarke	95	US	Actress	The Atomic City; Will Penny
September	3	Jacqueline Pearce	74	UK	Actress	The Reptile; The Plague of the Zombies
September	4	Thomas Rickman	78	US	Screenwriter	Coal Miner's Daughter; Hooper
September	5	Christopher Lawford	63	US	Actor	The Russia House; Thirteen Days
September	6	Liz Fraser	88	UK	Actress	I'm All Right Jack; The Americanization of Emily
September	6	Burt Reynolds	82	US	Actor, Director	Boogie Nights; Smokey and the Bandit
September	7	Sheila White	69	UK	Actress	Oliver!; Unidentified Flying Oddball
September	10	Peter Donat	90	US	Actor	The Godfather Part II; The Hindenburg
September	11	Fenella Fielding	90	UK	Actress	The Old Dark House; Carry On Screaming!
September	15	John M. Dwyer	83	US	Set Decorator	Coal Miner's Daughter; Terminator 2: Judgment Day
September	15	Kirin Kiki	75	Japan	Actress	Shoplifters; Still Walking
September	15	Dudley Sutton	85	UK	Actor	The Devils; Edward II
September	15	Zhu Xu	88	China	Actor	The King of Masks; Shower
September	18	Marceline Loridan-Ivens	90	France	Director, Actress, Screenwriter	A Tale of the Wind; Peut-être
September	19	Denis Norden	96	UK	Screenwriter	Buona Sera, Mrs. Campbell; The Bliss of Mrs. Blossom
September	19	Gamil Ratib	91	Egypt	Actor	Lawrence of Arabia; Trapeze
September	23	Gary Kurtz	78	US	Producer	Star Wars; American Graffiti
September	23	Mark Livolsi	56	US	Film Editor	Wedding Crashers; The Blind Side
September	23	Al Matthews	75	US	Actor	Aliens; The Fifth Element
September	26	Roger Robinson	78	US	Actor	Willie Dynamite; Newman's Law
October	1	Charles Aznavour	94	France	Actor, Singer	Shoot the Piano Player; The Tin Drum
October	1	Stelvio Cipriani	81	Italy	Composer	The Anonymous Venetian; The Great Kidnapping
October	4	Will Vinton	70	US	Animator, Director	Return to Oz; The Adventures of Mark Twain
October	4	Audrey Wells	58	US	Screenwriter, Director	Under the Tuscan Sun; The Hate U Give
October	6	Scott Wilson	76	US	Actor	In Cold Blood; G.I. Jane
October	7	Peggy McCay	90	US	Actress	Bustin' Loose; Lad, A Dog
October	7	Celeste Yarnall	74	US	Actress	Bob & Carol & Ted & Alice; Eve
October	8	Arnold Kopelson	83	US	Producer	Platoon; The Fugitive
October	8	Venantino Venantini	88	Italy	Actor	Ladyhawke; The Agony and the Ecstasy
October	10	Raymond Danon	88	France	Producer	Liza; The Judge and the Assassin
October	14	Milena Dravić	78	Serbia	Actress	Battle of Neretva; The Camp Followers
October	18	Danny Leiner	57	US	Director	Dude, Where's My Car?; Harold & Kumar Go to White Castle
October	19	Diana Sowle	88	US	Actress	Willy Wonka & the Chocolate Factory; Clear and Present Danger
October	23	James Karen	94	US	Actor	Poltergeist; The Return of the Living Dead
November	1	Carlo Giuffrè	89	Italy	Actor	The Girl with the Pistol; The Railroad Man
November	1	Ken Swofford	85	US	Actor	Annie; Skyjacked
November	2	Raymond Chow	91	Hong Kong	Producer	Enter the Dragon; Police Story
November	2	Kitty O'Neil	72	US	Stuntwoman	The Blues Brothers; Smokey and the Bandit II
November	3	Sondra Locke	74	US	Actress, Director	The Heart Is a Lonely Hunter; Sudden Impact
November	7	Francis Lai	86	France	Composer	Love Story; A Man and a Woman
November	11	Douglas Rain	90	Canada	Voice Actor	2001: A Space Odyssey; 2010: The Year We Make Contact
November	12	Stan Lee	95	US	Comic Book Writer, Producer, Actor	The Avengers; Iron Man
November	15	John Bluthal	89	Australia	Actor	The Fifth Element; Hail, Caesar!
November	16	Pablo Ferro	83	Cuba	Title Designer	Dr. Strangelove; A Clockwork Orange
November	16	William Goldman	87	US	Screenwriter	Butch Cassidy and the Sundance Kid; Marathon Man
November	19	Dominique Blanchar	91	France	Actress	L'Avventura; Decision Before Dawn
November	19	Witold Sobociński	89	Poland	Cinematographer	Frantic; The Promised Land
November	21	Michele Carey	76	US	Actress	El Dorado; Dirty Dingus Magee
November	23	Nicolas Roeg	90	UK	Director, Cinematographer	The Man Who Fell to Earth; Don't Look Now
November	24	Ricky Jay	72	US	Actor	Magnolia; Tomorrow Never Dies
November	25	Giuliana Calandra	82	Italy	Actress	Deep Red; The Last Woman
November	25	Gloria Katz	76	US	Screenwriter, Producer	American Graffiti; Howard the Duck
November	26	Bernardo Bertolucci	77	Italy	Director, Screenwriter	The Last Emperor; Last Tango in Paris
November	26	Samuel Hadida	64	Morocco	Producer	True Romance; Resident Evil
November	26	Stephen Hillenburg	57	US	Director, Animator	The SpongeBob SquarePants Movie; The SpongeBob Movie: Sponge Out of Water
December	1	Ken Berry	85	US	Actor, Singer	Herbie Rides Again; The Cat from Outer Space
December	3	Philip Bosco	88	US	Actor	Working Girl; Children of a Lesser God
December	3	Geoff Murphy	80	New Zealand	Director, Screenwriter	Freejack; Young Guns II
December	6	Tim Rossovich	72	US	Actor	Night Shift; Cloak & Dagger
December	9	Michael Seymour	86	UK	Production Designer	Alien; Beverly Hills Cop III
December	12	Ferenc Kósa	81	Hungary	Director, Screenwriter	Ten Thousand Days; The Upthrown Stone
December	14	Matti Kassila	94	Finnish	Director	The Harvest Month; The Girl from Moon Bridge
December	17	Galt MacDermot	89	Canada	Composer	Hair; Mistress
December	17	Penny Marshall	75	US	Director, Actress	A League of Their Own; Big
December	19	Norman Gimbel	91	US	Lyricist	Norma Rae; The Other Side of the Mountain
December	19	Peter Masterson	84	US	Actor, Director	The Exorcist; In the Heat of the Night
December	20	Donald Moffat	87	UK	Actor	The Thing; The Right Stuff
December	24	Patrice Martinez	55	US	Actress	Three Amigos; Beetlejuice
December	26	Frank Adonis	83	US	Actor	Goodfellas; Raging Bull
December	26	Jorge Grau	88	Spain	Director, Screenwriter	Let Sleeping Corpses Lie; Acteón
December	27	Børge Ring	97	Denmark	Animator	Heavy Metal; Anna & Bella
December	27	Robert Kerman	71	US	Actor	Cannibal Holocaust; Eaten Alive!
December	28	Iaia Fiastri	84	Italy	Screenwriter	To Forget Venice; Bread and Chocolate
December	28	June Whitfield	93	UK	Actress	Carry On Abroad; Jude
December	29	Agneta Eckemyr	68	Sweden	Actress	The Island at the Top of the World; Blindman
December	29	Ringo Lam	63	Hong Kong	Director	Prison on Fire; The Suspect
December	29	Rosenda Monteros	83	Mexico	Actress	The Magnificent Seven; She
December	30	Don Lusk	105	US	Animator	Pinocchio; Fantasia
December	31	Richard Marks	75	US	Film Editor	Terms of Endearment; Apocalypse Now
December	31	Al Reinert	71	US	Screenwriter, Director	Apollo 13; For All Mankind

== Film debuts ==
- Gideon Adlon – Blockers
- Simone Ashley – Boogie Man
- Hafþór Júlíus Björnsson – Kickboxer: Retaliation
- Ronny Chieng – Crazy Rich Asians
- David Corenswet – Affairs of State
- Lex Scott Davis – Superfly
- Winston Duke – Black Panther
- Daisy Edgar-Jones – Pond Life
- Jacob Elordi – Swinging Safari
- Cynthia Erivo – Bad Times at the El Royale
- Ester Expósito – When Angels Sleep
- Luna Fulgencio – Mirage
- Laura Galán – The Man Who Killed Don Quixote
- Lily Gao – Kin
- Maya Hawke – Ladyworld
- Fred Hechinger – Eighth Grade
- Aoife Hinds – The Commuter
- Hemal Ingle – Husharu
- Jordan Jacobo – To Fall in Love With Anyone, Do This
- Jeon Jong-seo – Burning
- Andrea Londo – Superfly
- Violet McGraw – Ready Player One
- Daniela Melchior – The Black Book
- Camila Mendes – The New Romantic
- John Mulaney – Spider-Man: Into the Spider-Verse
- Florian Munteanu – Creed II
- Jeffrey Ngai – Big Brother
- Hilton Pelser – The Kissing Booth
- Alba Planas – The Tree of Blood
- Shrinivas Pokale – Naal
- Banita Sandhu – October
- Frances Sholto-Douglas – Samson
- Cailee Spaeny – Pacific Rim Uprising
- Drew Starkey – American Animals
- Sophie Thatcher – Prospect
- Carolina Yuste – Carmen & Lola
