= János Koltai =

Hungarian actor (1935–2026)

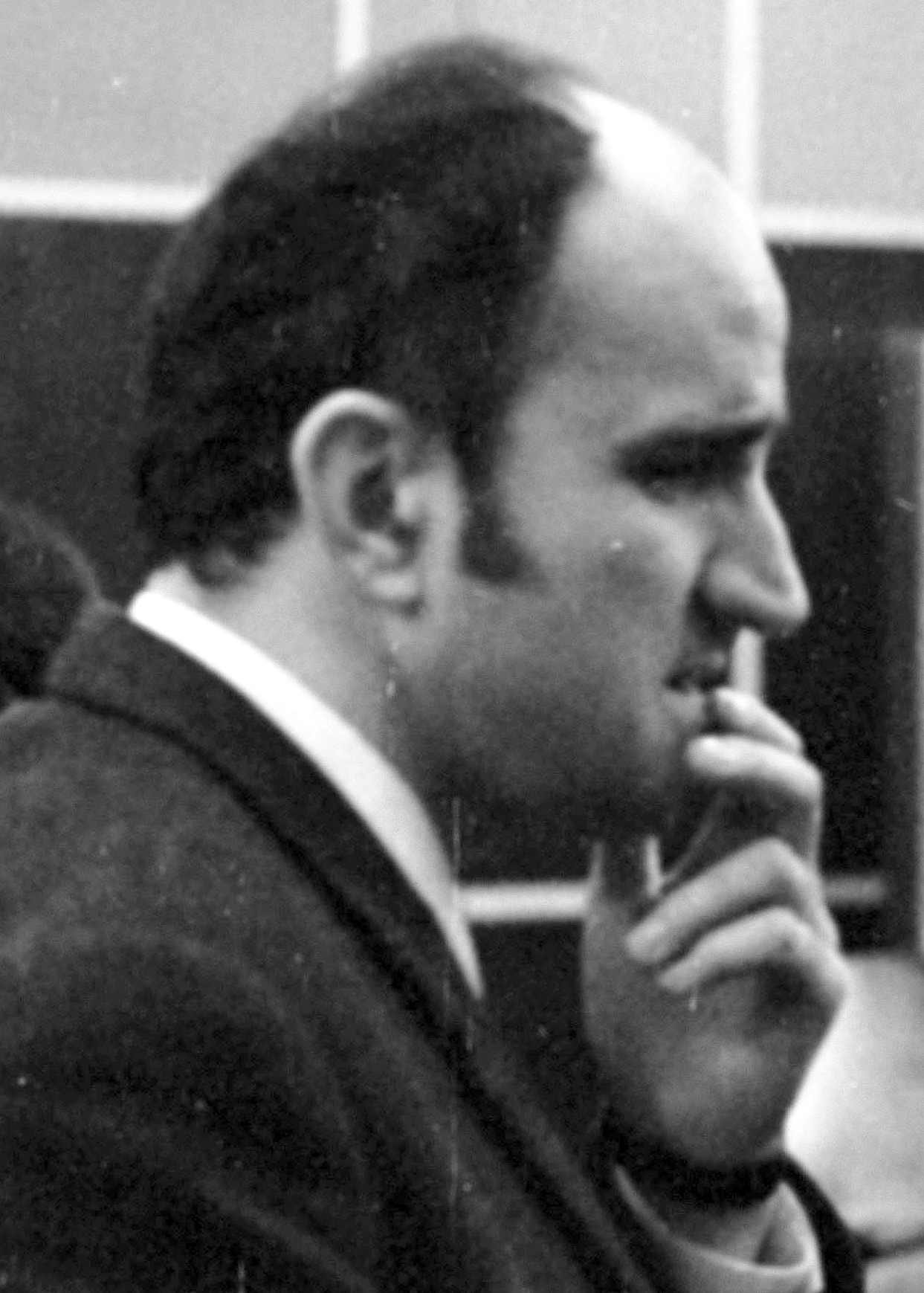
- Koltai in 1971, photographed by Zoltán Szalay
- Born: 8 June 1935; Budapest, Hungary
- Died: 16 January 2026 (aged 90); Ádánd, Hungary
- Occupation: Actor
- Years active: 1959–2021
- Spouse: Éva Pap

János Koltai (8 June 1935 – 16 January 2026) was a Hungarian actor. He played the character of Gábor Gábor on the television series Szomszédok, and he acted in numerous films and plays. He received the Jászai Mari Award in 1976.

Koltai died on 16 January 2026 in Ádánd, at the age of 90.

== Selected filmography ==
- Two Half Times in Hell (1961)
- Cantata (1963)
- Drama of the Lark (1963)
- The Round-Up (1966)
- Hideg Napok (1966)
- Three Nights of Love (1967)
- Ten Thousand Days (1967)
- Walls (1968)
