= Zoltán Latinovits =

Hungarian actor

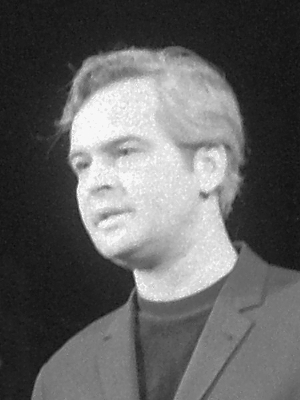
- Latinovits Zoltán
- Born: 9 September 1931; Budapest, Kingdom of Hungary
- Died: 4 June 1976 (aged 44); Balatonszemes, Hungary

Zoltán Latinovits (9 September 1931, in Budapest – 4 June 1976, in Balatonszemes) was a Hungarian actor.

== Early life ==
His mother divorced his father Oszkár Latinovits in 1941 and married István Frenreisz, a medical doctor, with whom she had two more children (István, who became an actor under the name István Bujtor, and musician Károly). He began his school career in 1937, when he was enrolled to the Damjanich Street Primary School in Budapest and graduated with excellent results in 1949 at the Szent Imre Gimnázium (St. Emery College). He became a carpenter and worked for a bridge building firm. He was a basketball player for Haladás SE from 1951 and was also a good sailor. 1956 Architect, Epithetic Faculty, Budapest University of Technology and Economics (Budapesti Műszaki Egyetem), Latinovits finished the university as the best of the year. He was involved in a drama group during his university years.

== Acting career ==
He started his professional acting career after various stints in student and amateur productions and his colleagues and fans talked about him as the King of Actors.

- 1956-1959. Debrecen, Csokonai Theatre.
- 1959-1961. Miskolc, National Theatre.
- 1961-1962. Debrecen, Csokonai Theatre.
- 1962-1966. Vígszínház (Comedy Theatre). One of his most successful roles performed there was Shakespeare's Romeo and Juliet in 1963, playing with Éva Ruttkai, his later wife.
- 1966-1968. Thália Theatre.
- 1969-1971. Vígszinház.
- 1971-1976. Veszprém, Petőfi Theatre, where he was able to realise his longtime dream of being able to direct.

One of the best performer of the poetry of Attila József, Gyula Illyés and Endre Ady.

== Film career ==
Performed in numerous films from the late 1950s to the early 1970s. One of the most famous is Szindbád (1971), based on the short stories by Gyula Krúdy and directed by Zoltán Huszárik.

== Death ==
Latinovits was run over by a train at the station of Balatonszemes near Lake Balaton in 1976. Though the official statements talked of suicide, it never became fully clear whether he had jumped deliberately in front of the train or whether his death was an accident. His death immediately became a romanticized legend, also due to the similarities with the suicide of poet Attila József, of whose poems Latinovits had been one of the foremost interpreters. Much later, in the 2010s, in a program on Kossuth Radio, the train driver who was forwarding the train confirmed the suicide: "He stepped in front of the locomotive with his hands held up, facing me, well within braking distance...

== Filmography ==
- Gyalog a menyországba (1959)
- Kertes házak utcája (1962)
- The Man of Gold (1962)
- Drama of the Lark (1963)
- Cantata (1963)
- Fotó Háber (1963)
- The Golden Head (1963)
- Karambol (1964)
- The Round-Up (1965)
- Sellő a pecsétgyűrűn (1965)
- Iszony (1965)
- Fény a redőny mögött (1965)
- Sok hűség semmiért (1966)
- Az orvos halála (1966)
- Minden kezdet nehéz (1966)
- Egy magyar nábob (1966)
- Hideg napok (1966)
- And Then The Guy... (1966)
- Aranysárkány (1966)
- Zoltán Kárpáthy (1966)
- Máglyák Firenzében (1967) (TV)
- Mélyrétegben (1967)
- Mocorgó (1967) (TV)
- Tanulmány a nőkről (1967)
- Fiúk a térről (1967)
- Three Nights of Love (1967)
- Ninocska, avagy azok az átkozott férfiak (1967) (TV)
- Silence and Cry (1968)
- Bánk bán(1968) (TV)
- Kártyavár (1968)
- Stars of Eger (1968)
- Walls (1968)
- Keresztelő (1968)
- A régi nyár (1969) (TV)
- A nagy kék jelzés (1969)
- Komédia a tetőn (1969) (TV)
- Hazai pálya (1969)
- Az örökös (1969)
- Alfa Rómeó és Júlia (1969)
- Kéktiszta szerelem (1969)
- Az alvilág professzora (1969)
- The Toth Family (1969)
- Utazás a koponyám körül (1970)
- Szerelmi álmok (1970)
- Az utolsó ítélet (1970) (TV)
- Hálóban (1970) (TV)
- Szemtől szemben (1970)
- Mindannyiotok lelkiismerete megnyugodhat… (1970)
- Szindbád (1971)
- Bözsi és a többiek (1971) (TV)
- Lujzi (1971) (TV)
- Csárdáskirálynő (1971)
- A legszebb férfikor (1972)
- Volt egyszer egy család (1972)
- Híres szökések(1972) (TV serie)
- A lámpás (1972)]
- Harminckét nevem volt (1972)
- És mégis mozog a föld (1973)
- Trójai nők (1973) (TV)
- III. Richárd (1973) (TV)
- A magyar ugaron (1973)
- A dunai hajós (1974)
- The Pendragon Legend (1974)
- Kaputt (1974) (TV)
- 141 Minutes from the Unfinished Sentence (1975)
- Az áruló (1975) (TV)
- Az öreg (1975)
- Ballagó idő (1976)
- The Fifth Seal (1976)
- Ki látott engem? (1977) (vois only)

== Published books ==
1973. Ködszurkáló (Skywriter) 1985. Emlékszem a röpülés boldogságára (collected works)

== Prizes ==
(1966) – Jászai Mari prize (1970) – Balázs Béla prize (1975) – Significant artist (1989) – Kossuth Prize (posth.) (1970) - Best Actor - Silver Shell - 18th San Sebastian Film Festival
