= Szindbád =

- Theatrical release poster
- Directed by: Zoltán Huszárik
- Screenplay by: Zoltán Huszárik; János Tóth
- Based on: stories by Gyula Krúdy
- Starring: Zoltán Latinovits; Margit Dajka; Éva Ruttkai
- Cinematography: Sándor Sára
- Edited by: Zoltán Huszárik; Mihály Morell
- Music by: Zoltán Jeney
- Production company: Mafilm Stúdió 1
- Release date: 25 November 1971
- Running time: 90 minutes
- Country: Hungary
- Language: Hungarian

Szindbád (also known as Szinbád / Sindbad /Sinbad) is a 1971 Hungarian film directed by Zoltán Huszárik, and based on short stories by the writer Gyula Krúdy.

== Plot ==
The film opens with a sequence of fleeting images - the stamens of a flower, drops of oil on water, glowing embers, a spider's web, a strand of blonde hair, a leaf frozen in the ice, rain dripping from a wooden roof, etc. - each of which will subsequently be linked to one of Szindbád's memories of his love affairs. We then see the body of the dead or dying Szindbád lying in a cart drawn by a horse through the countryside, where nobody any longer seems interested in him. A voiceover (of Szindbád) then introduces a stream of memories, often disconnected and unchronological, of the many women who have been the focus of his life.

== Cast ==
- Zoltán Latinovits, as Szindbád
- Margit Dajka, as Majmunka
- Éva Ruttkai, as Lenke

== Production ==
The central figure of Szindbád, although his name makes reference to the character of Sinbad in the Arabian Nights, here belongs to the last years of the Austro-Hungarian empire around the turn of the 20th century (the period during which the original stories were written). Szindbád is a middle-aged traveller driven by memories of his amorous adventures (and of the favourite meals he has savoured along the way); he is an observer of life as it passes by rather than an active participant in it, and his inner world is conveyed in a stream of consciousness reflecting his unsatisfied desires and his nostalgia for the past.

The original choice to play the role of Szindbád was Vittorio De Sica, but when terms could not be agreed the part was given to the leading Hungarian actor Zoltán Latinovits who played it with "a reckless chic that makes him irresistible even as he's being detestable".

The rich colour photography (its "tactile sensuality") created by cinematographer Sándor Sára was central to the evocation of the refined and elegant social world of the Hungarian bourgeoisie at the turn of the century. This, along with the film's fractured time structure and rapid montages of brief and freely associated shots, created a marked contrast with the prevailing style of stately tracking shots associated with the cinema of Miklós Jancsó. In this respect the director Zoltán Huszárik, who completed only one further feature film before his suspected suicide in 1981, was seen as a unique contributor to Hungarian cinema.

== Reception ==
Szindbád was presented at the Venice Film Festival in 1972.

In Hungary Szindbád has been regarded as one of the classics of its national cinema. In 2000 a group of Hungarian critics included it in a list of the twelve best Hungarian films, the so-called New Budapest Twelve.

In the English-speaking world, apart from some limited screenings at the time of its release, Szindbád remained largely unknown for many years. It was issued on DVD in 2011. Critics have invariably praised the sumptuous visual qualities of the film: "the extraordinary (and very beautiful) images that pour over the screen"; "a film of intoxicating voluptuousness"; "a beautiful film ... painterly but not simply pretty, with a late-evening pilgrimage by candlelight that settles in your memory, and possibly the loveliest ice-skating sequence ever put on film". The film's non-linear and fragmented structure allows the linking of images, sometimes almost subliminally, to evoke Szindbád's memories or his subconscious, and the description "Proustian" has repeatedly appeared in critical assessments (perhaps echoing a frequent characterization of the writings of the author of the original stories, Gyula Krúdy).
