= Balatonszemes =

- Village
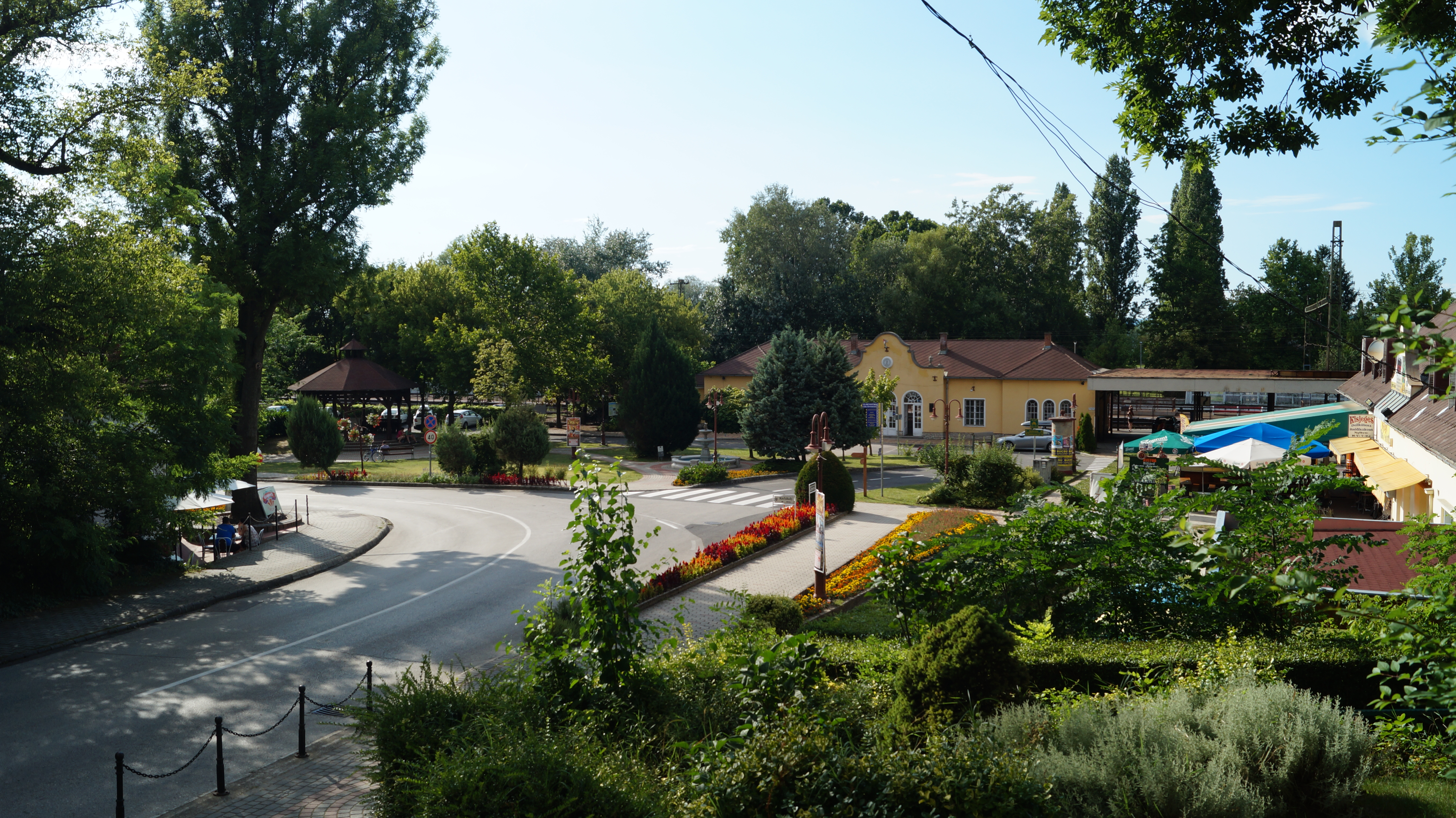
- Centre of Balatonszemes

- Coat of arms

- Location of Balatonszemes
- Coordinates: 46.80944°N 17.77109°E
- Country: Hungary
- Region: Southern Transdanubia
- County: Somogy
- District: Siófok
- RC Diocese: Kaposvár

Government
  - Mayor: Zsolt Iváncsics (Fidesz)

Area
  - Total: 36.02 km^{2} (13.91 sq mi)

Population (2017)
  - Total: 1,710
  - Density: 47.5/km^{2} (123/sq mi)
- Demonym(s): szemesi, balatonszemesi
- Time zone: UTC+1 (CET)
  - Summer (DST): UTC+2 (CEST)
- Postal code: 8636
- Area code: (+36) 84
- Patron Saint: Anthony of Padua
- Motorways: M7
- Distance from Budapest: 137 km (85 mi) Northeast
- NUTS 3 code: HU232
- MP: Ernő Csatári (Tisza Party)
- Website: Balatonszemes Online

Balatonszemes is a village in Somogy county, Hungary. It lies on the southern shore of Lake Balaton, on the northern slopes of the Outer Somogy hills overlooking the lake and on the half-kilometre wide coastal plain. It has a train station on the (Budapest-)Székesfehérvár-Gyékényes railway line.

The settlement is part of the Balatonboglár wine region.

== History ==
The area has been inhabited since prehistoric times. The large tumulus in the present-day cemetery is thought to be of Iron Age origin, and probably contains the ashes of a prominent person. Archaeological remains from antiquity prove that both Celts and Romans lived here.

It was inhabited by Hungarians from the time of the conquest. The important trade route from the Danube to the Adriatic Sea ran southwest from the shore of Lake Balaton, and as a lookout and well-defensible point it was a fortified place from ancient times. In the Middle Ages a castle here was part of the chain of fortresses in Turkish times, and as such regularly changed hands between the Hungarians and the Turks, was repeatedly destroyed and then refortified.

The earliest parts of the village's Roman Catholic church date back to the 12th century.

In the 18th and 19th centuries, from 1790 to 1861, there was also a stagecoach station in the village, which still stands today and houses the Postal Museum.

Originally a village of peasants and fishermen, Balatonszemes – like other settlements along the lake – started to be also considered a bathing resort by the end of the 19th century (soon after the railroad was built), and the building of villas and holiday homes began, which was given a new impetus when the boat harbour was built in 1913.

== Gallery ==
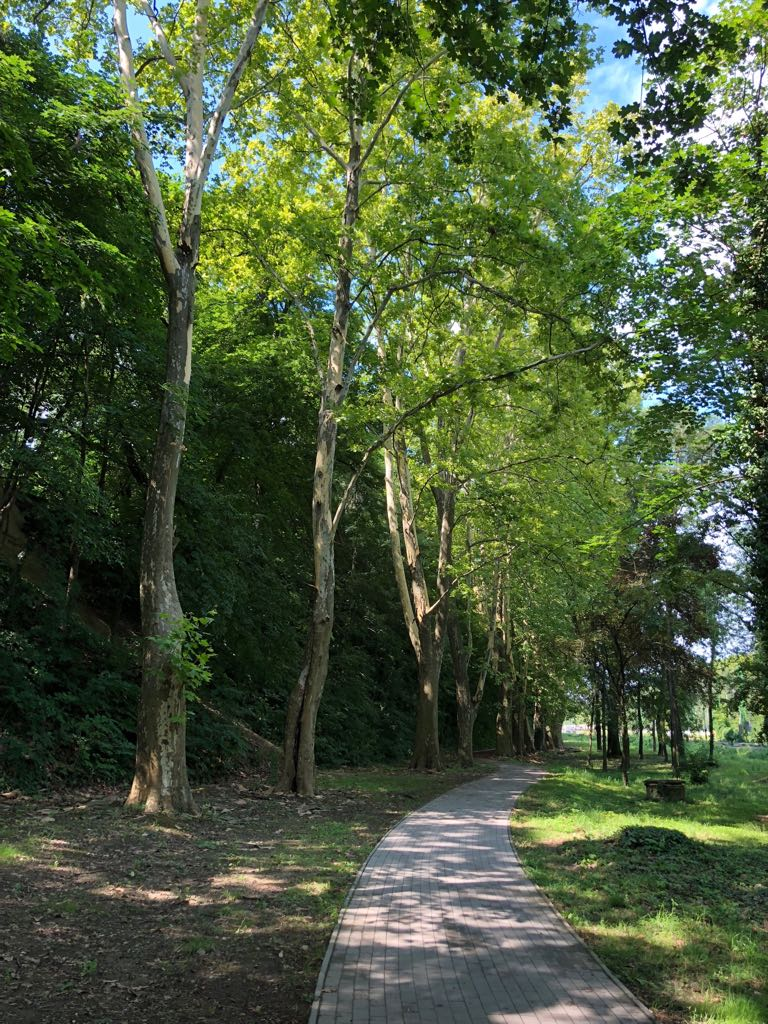
Cycling road

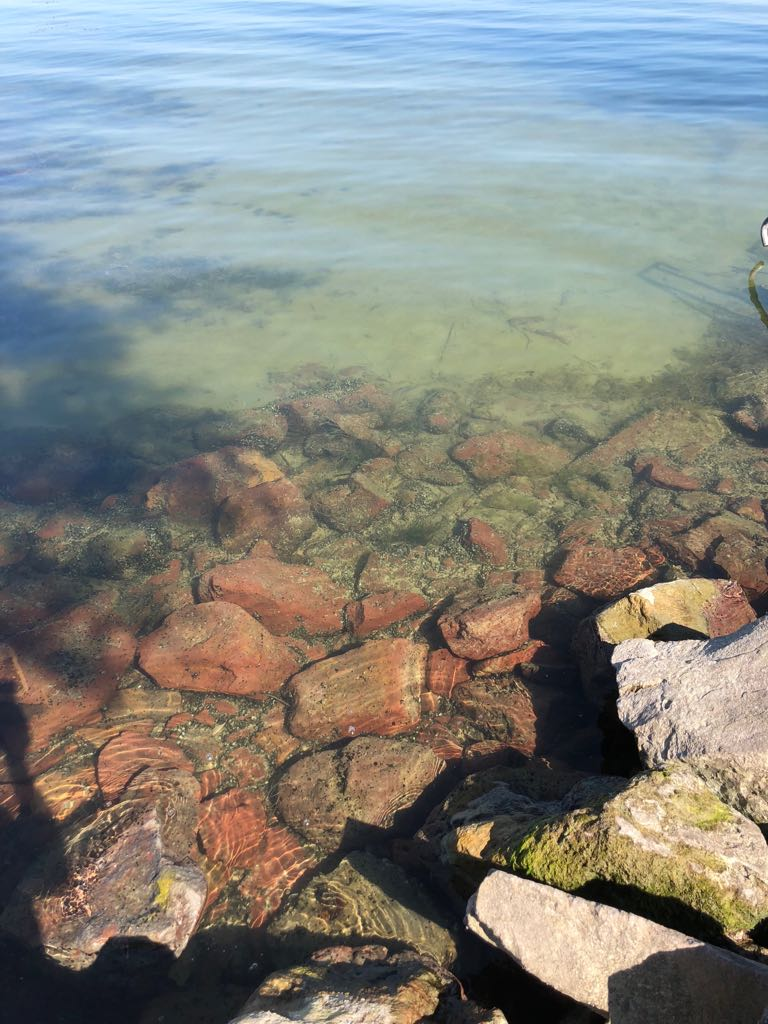
Lake Balaton near Balatonszemes

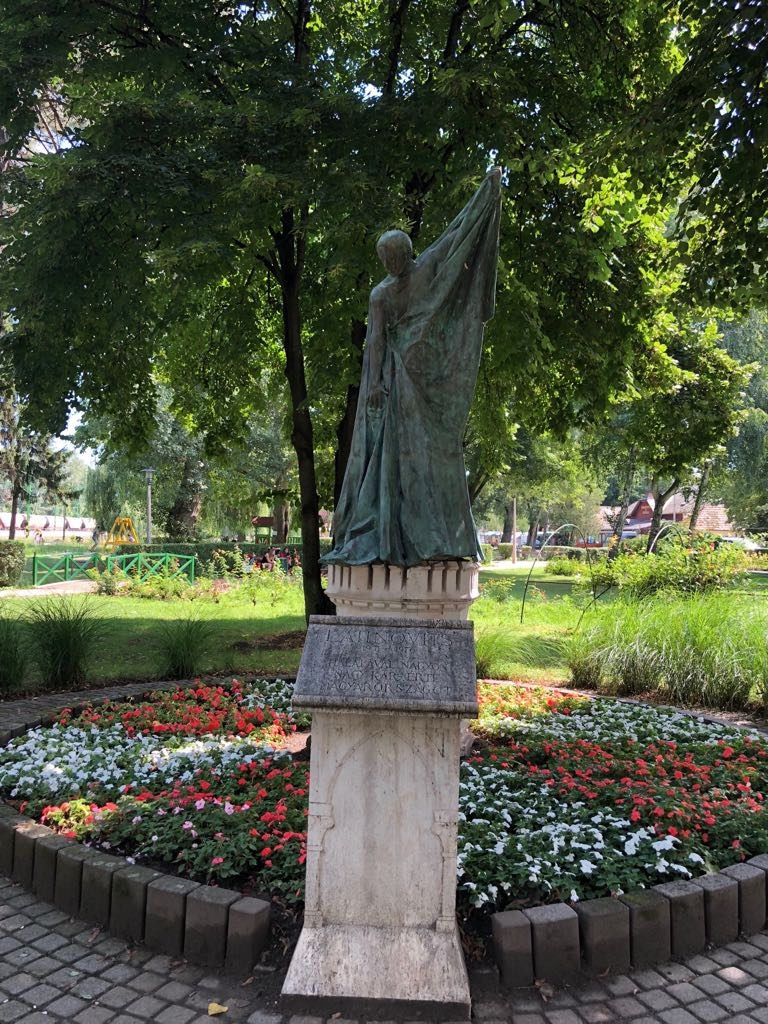
Statue of Zoltán Latinovits

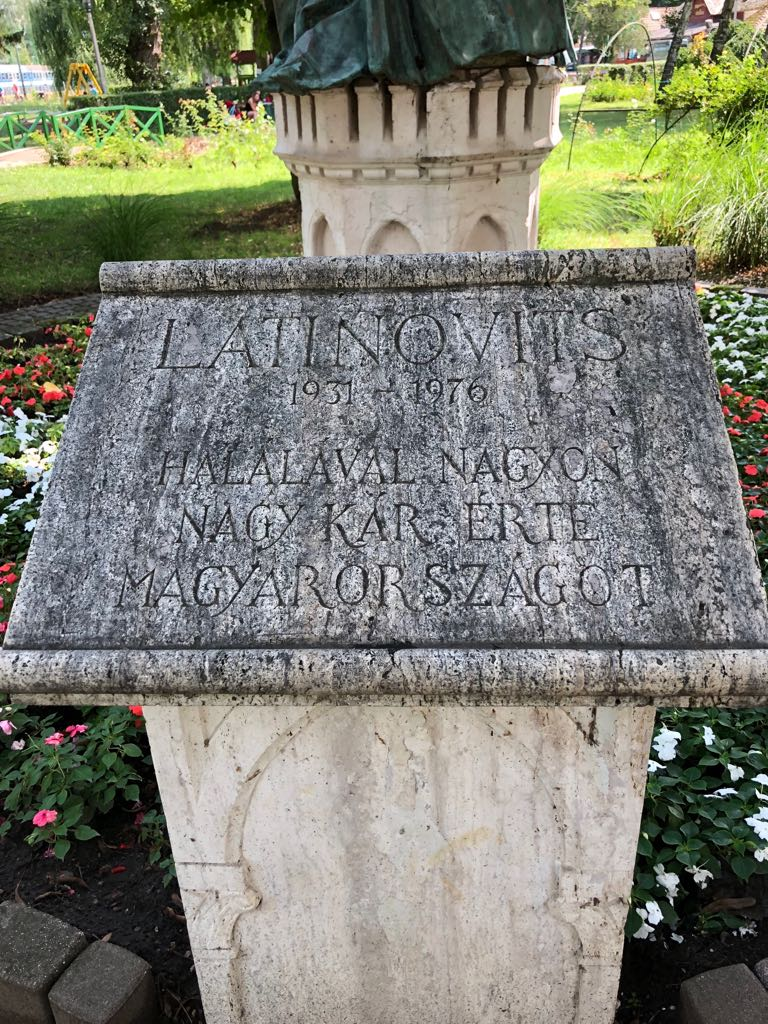
Plaque of the Statue of Zoltán Latinovits

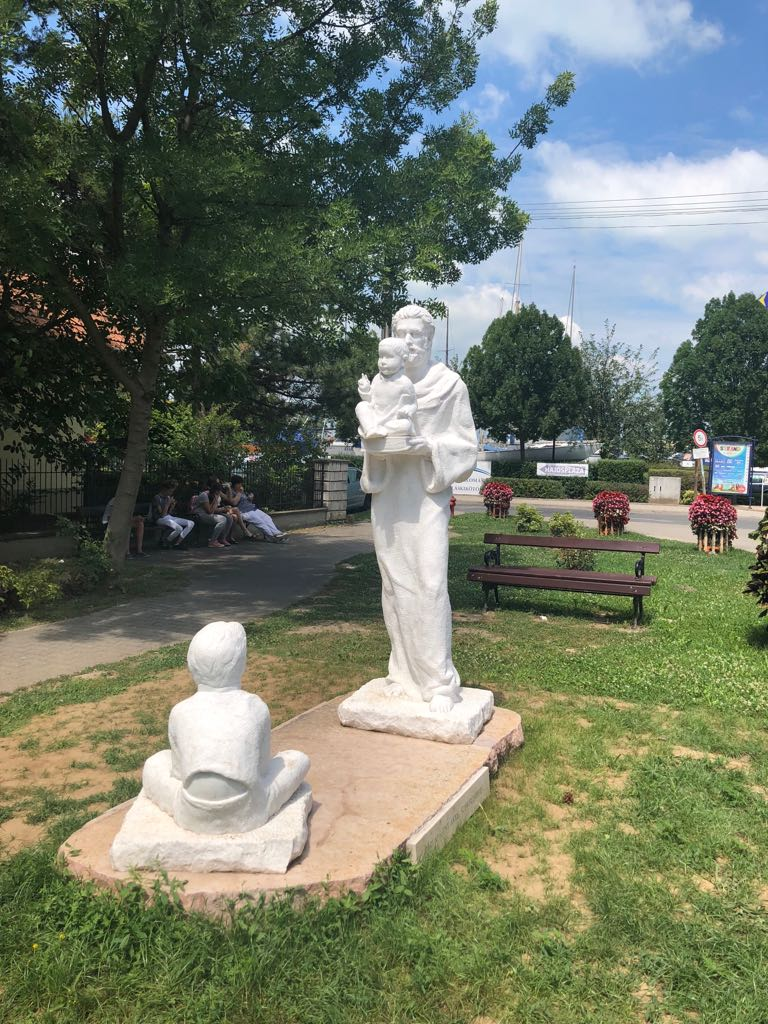
Statue of Anthony of Padua

== Notable residents ==
- Zoltán Latinovits (1931-1976), Hungarian actor
- István Bujtor (1942-2009), Hungarian actor, director, producer, and screenplay writer
- Eszter Perényi (born 1943), Hungarian violinist
