= The Upthrown Stone =

1969 film

- Directed by: Sándor Sára
- Written by: Sándor Csoóri; Ferenc Kósa; Sándor Sára
- Starring: Lajos Balázsovits
- Cinematography: Sándor Sára
- Edited by: Mihály Morell
- Release date: 17 April 1969
- Running time: 91 minutes
- Country: Hungary
- Language: Hungarian

The Upthrown Stone (Hungarian: Feldobott kő) is a 1969 Hungarian drama film directed by Sándor Sára. It was listed to compete at the 1968 Cannes Film Festival, but the festival was cancelled due to the events of May 1968 in France. The film was also selected as the Hungarian entry for the Best Foreign Language Film at the 42nd Academy Awards, but was not accepted as a nominee.

== Cast ==
- Lajos Balázsovits as Pásztor Balázs
- Nadesda Kazassian as Irini, the wife of Iliasz
- Todor Todorov as Iliasz
- László Bánhidi as János bácsi
- István Iglódi as Halmos Jancsi
- Tibor Molnár as Kerék András
- Katalin Berek as Balázs' mother
- Ferenc Jónás
- Ferenc Némethy as Gönczi
- József Bihari as the grandfather of Balázs
- János K. Szabó
- Lajos Öze as a college teacher
- Arisztea Dini
- János Koltai as Inspector
- János Pásztor as Balázs's Father

== See also ==
- List of submissions to the 42nd Academy Awards for Best Foreign Language Film
- List of Hungarian submissions for the Academy Award for Best Foreign Language Film
