= Domony =

- Coat of arms

- Location of Domony in Hungary
- Coordinates: 47.65298°N 19.43810°E
- Country: Hungary
- Region: Central Hungary
- County: Pest
- Subregion: Aszódi
- Rank: Village

Area
  - Total: 21.80 km^{2} (8.42 sq mi)

Population (1 January 2008)
  - Total: 2,084
  - Density: 95.60/km^{2} (247.6/sq mi)
- Time zone: UTC+1 (CET)
  - Summer (DST): UTC+2 (CEST)
- Postal code: 2182
- Area code: +36 28
- KSH code: 04808
- Website: https://domony.hu/

Domony is a village in Pest County, Hungary.

== Population ==
As of population census 2022, Domony has a population of 2,269 people.

== Notable residents ==
- Zoltán Huszárik, Hungarian film director, screenwriter, visual artist and actor.
