= The Family Jewels (film) =

1965 film by Jerry Lewis

- Directed by: Jerry Lewis
- Written by: Jerry Lewis; Bill Richmond
- Produced by: Jerry Lewis
- Starring: Jerry Lewis; Sebastian Cabot
- Cinematography: W. Wallace Kelley
- Edited by: John Woodcock
- Music by: Pete King
- Production company: Jerry Lewis Productions
- Distributed by: Paramount Pictures
- Release date: July 1, 1965
- Running time: 99 minutes
- Country: United States
- Language: English
- Box office: $2,600,000 (US/ Canada rentals); 824,903 admissions (France)

The Family Jewels is a 1965 American comedy film. It was filmed from January 18 to April 2, 1965, and was released by Paramount Pictures on July 1, 1965. The film was co-written, directed, and produced by Jerry Lewis who also played seven roles in the film. Lewis' co-star, Donna Butterworth, made only one other film, Paradise, Hawaiian Style, with Elvis Presley. Gary Lewis & The Playboys have a cameo in which they sing "Little Miss Go-Go"; their hit song "This Diamond Ring" is also featured.

== Plot ==
Donna Peyton is a ten-year-old girl who inherits $30 million from her industrialist father. Per terms of his will, Donna must choose one of her six uncles to become her new "father". Willard Woodward, the family chauffeur, takes Donna to all of her uncles to stay with them for two weeks. Donna's uncles are:

- James Peyton, a ferryboat captain, her father's oldest brother who served in the U.S. Navy during World War II.
- Everett Peyton, a famous circus clown who hates kids and has moved to Switzerland to avoid U. S. taxes.
- Julius Peyton, a professional photographer who photographs female models.
- Captain Edward "Eddie" Peyton, a pilot based in Los Angeles, California who owns his own airline ("Eddie's Airways, the Airline for the Birds") consisting of one plane, a Ford Trimotor. When five elderly ladies book him for an emergency flight to Chicago he loses their luggage, accidentally eject-seats himself from the plane, and ends up flying in a circle and landing back in Los Angeles.
- Skylock Peyton, a Holmesian detective who loves tea and lived in England until he lost his passport and moved back to the United States. He is accompanied by his faithful companion, Dr. Matson, but Skylock pays more attention to a pool game in Robert Strauss's pool parlour than to Donna.
- Bugsy Peyton, a gangster whom everyone believes was killed by the mob. Only interested in Donna's inheritance, he kidnaps her. Willard rescues her by tricking the gangsters into believing they are surrounded by armed soldiers.

The more time she spends with her uncles, the more Donna realizes that Willard should be her father: he was always a father to her even when her real father was still alive, because her father was too busy to spend time with her. Unfortunately the family lawyers will not allow her to choose Willard, insisting that she must choose one of her uncles. At the last minute, Uncle Everett shows up unexpectedly, asking Donna to choose him. To everyone's surprise, Donna agrees, and the two leave together. As they walk down the hallway, Donna reveals that she knows the truth: "Uncle Everett" is actually Willard in disguise. She recognized him because, as always, his shoes were on the wrong feet.

== Cast ==
- Jerry Lewis as Willard Woodward / James Peyton / Everett Peyton / Julius Peyton / Capt. Eddie Peyton / Skylock Peyton / Bugsy Peyton
- Donna Butterworth as Donna Peyton
- Sebastian Cabot as Dr. Matson
- Neil Hamilton as Attorney
- Jay Adler as Mr. Lyman, Attorney
- Anne Baxter as Actress in In-Flight Movie (uncredited)
- Ellen Corby as Senior Citizen Airline Passenger
- Gene Baylos as Circus Clown
- Benny Rubin as Sign Painter (uncredited)
- Scatman Crothers as Airport Worker (uncredited)
- Norman Leavitt as Gas Station Owner (uncredited)

== Production ==
The character of Julius Peyton is similar to the character of Julius Kelp in Jerry Lewis' earlier film The Nutty Professor (1963).

== Home media ==
The film was released three times on DVD. Paramount released it on October 12, 2004, and January 5, 2021, and Warner Archive released the film on made-to-order DVD on June 20, 2013.

== Reception ==
On Rotten Tomatoes, the film holds an 80% rating based on 5 reviews, with an average rating of 6.62/10.

== Legacy ==
Several of the film's characters were caricatured in Will the Real Jerry Lewis Please Sit Down, an animated series.
