= Irány Mexikó! =

- Written by: Gedeon Viktor; József Romhányi
- Directed by: Éva Zsurzs
- Starring: Gyula Bodrogi; Ági Voith; Kálmán Latabár
- Country of origin: Hungary
- Original language: Hungarian

Production
- Cinematography: György Czabarka
- Running time: 79 minutes

Original release
- Release: 21 September 1968

Irány Mexikó is a 1968 Hungarian television musical film directed by Éva Zsurzs and starring Gyula Bodrogi, Manyi Kiss and Kálmán Latabár.

== Main cast ==
- Gyula Bodrogi as Gergely Balažs
- Ági Voith as Teri Torma
- Kálmán Latabár as Csóró
- Kálmán Latabár Jr. as Sanyi
- Anikó Felföldi as Lenke
- Manyi Kiss as Tilda
- István Egri as TV-presenter
- András Kósa as young cinematographer
- Sándor Siménfalvi as training camp concierge
- András Szigeti as cyclist (credited as András Schwetz)
- Ádám Szirtes as police major
- Endre Várhelyi as Ernő Torma, Teri's father
- Anna Bélaváry as singer
- Mária Patocska as singer
- János Gálcsiki as cinematographer
- János Koós as himself
- Eszter Tamási as herself
- Mária Toldy as herself
- László Nemere
- László Mezei
- Pál Somogyvári
- Györgyi Telessy
- Gedeon Viktor
- János Pagonyi
- István Balázs
- Márta Bakó
- István Nagy
