= Gyula Bodrogi =

Hungarian actor

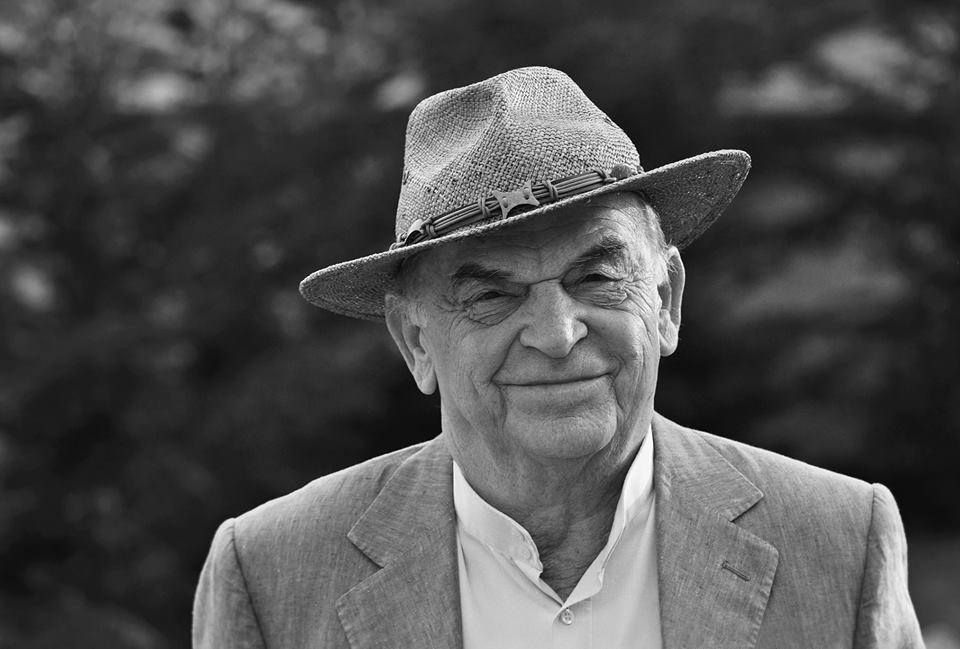
- Born: 15 April 1934 (age 92); Budapest, Hungary
- Occupation: Film actor
- Years active: 1957–present
- Spouse: Mari Törőcsik (1956-1964) (divorced)

Gyula Bodrogi (born 15 April 1934) is a Hungarian television and film actor.

== Selected filmography ==
- Sleepless Years (1959)
- Young Noszty and Mary Toth (1960)
- Cantata (1963)
- Twenty Hours (1965)
- Three Nights of Love (1967)
- The Testament of Aga Koppanyi (1967)
- Tanulmány a nökrôl (1967)
- Irány Mexikó! (1968)
- Hatholdas rózsakert (1970)
- Do not Panic, Major Kardos (1982)
- Szerencsés Dániel (1983)
- Glass Tiger (2001)
- Magyar vándor (2004)
- Glass Tiger 2 (2006)
- A Fox's Tale (2008)
