= Eszter Tamási =

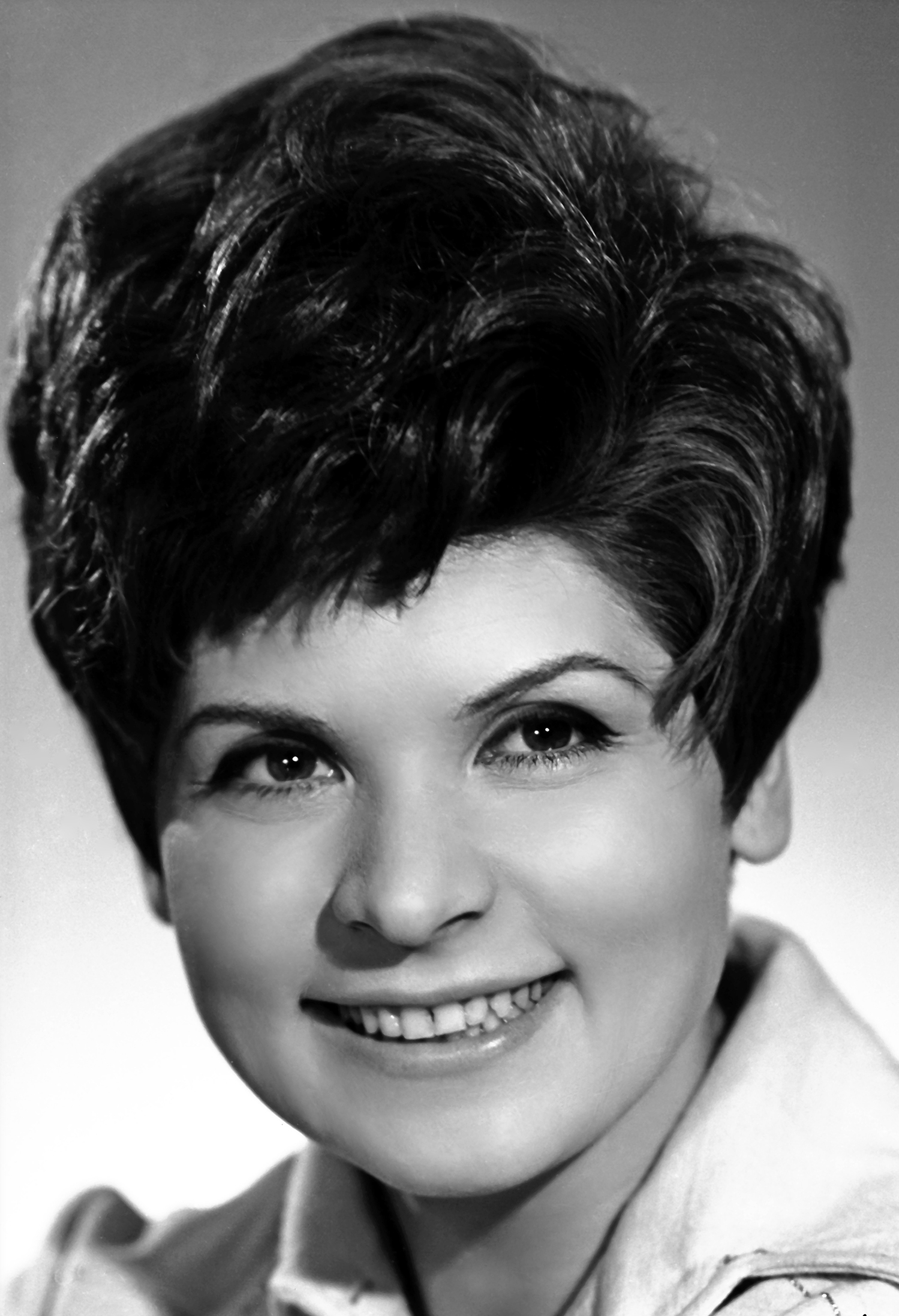
- Born: 20 April 1938; Mezőtúr, Hungary
- Died: 16 December 1991 (aged 53); Budapest, Hungary
- Occupations: Actress; TV announcer; reporter; presenter

Eszter Tamási (20 April 1938 – 16 December 1991) was a Hungarian actress and TV announcer.

== Early life ==
She was the child of a poor family and came to Budapest in 1955. She completed her acting studies at Kálmán Rózsahegyi's acting school, then worked as an extra at the film factory. Based on a photograph, she was approached and employed as an announcer at the Hungarian Television, on July 11, 1957, she stepped in front of the cameras for the first time.

Eszter also worked as an announcer and presenter on TV. Among others, she led the Híradó, the Dance and Song Festival, the Kodály singing competition (alternating with Júlia Kudlik), School Television. In 1971, the wish show "Onök kérút " started, of which she was the host of until 1990. She then worked as a reporter. Eszter also proved her versatility in entertaining New Year's Eve shows and contributed to sound records as a storyteller. Her daughter Krisztina was born in 1965.

She died at the young age of 53 from a brain tumor. At the time of her death, TV Híradó said goodbye to her with a commemorative compilation, the details of which were selected by her colleague Ákos Moldoványi from the MTV archive.

== Television career ==
She worked on Magyar Televízió from 1957 until 1991. Eszter was one of the first television personalities in Hungarian television history. She was a very popular person.

== Films ==
- Dollárpapa (1956)
- Játék a szerelemmel (1957)
- Láz (1957)
- Irány Mexikó! (1968)
- Donaug'schichten - Die Straße nach Budapest (1969)
- A tettek beszélnek (1975)
