= Two Half Times in Hell =

1961 film

Two Halves in Hell
- Directed by: Zoltán Fábri
- Written by: Zoltán Fábri; Péter Bacsó
- Starring: Imre Sinkovits; Dezső Garas; Gyula Benkő; István Velenczei
- Cinematography: Ferenc Szécsényi
- Edited by: Ferenc Szécsényi
- Music by: Ferenc Farkas
- Production company: Hunnia Filmgyár
- Release dates: November 2, 1961 (Hungary); March 24, 1962 (Argentina)
- Running time: 140 minutes
- Country: Hungary
- Languages: Hungarian; Spanish subtitles

Two Halves in Hell (Hungarian: Két félidő a pokolban) is a 1961 Hungarian war film directed and co-written by Zoltán Fábri. The film is based on a 1942 football match between German soldiers and their Soviet Ukrainian prisoners of war during World War II, known as the Death Match, although in the film the prisoners of war are Hungarian labour servicemen.

The film won a critics' award at Boston Cinema Festival 1962.

Two Halves in Hell was remade as the 1981 American-British film Escape to Victory, this time with the prisoners of war representing a diverse group of countries. In addition, the 1974 film The Longest Yard, about an American football game between prisoners and their wardens, has been compared to Two Halves in Hell; The Longest Yard has been remade three times.

== Plot ==
It is the spring of 1944. Nazi officers want to organize a football match for Hitler's birthday, in which Germans would play against Hungarian labour servicemen of war. They call for the famous Hungarian footballer, Ónódi, and order him to organize a team. Ónódi accepts, but in turn demands extra food, a ball with which he and his team can train before the match, and asks that they be allowed to concentrate on training before the match and not work. The Germans accept all the demands, but recommend Ónódi not include any Jews in his team. However, Ónódi can't organize the team only from his labour battalion, because only 8 out of 98 servicemen can play football. Therefore, Ónódi recruits players from the other battalion. One of the players is Steiner, who is a Jew and can't play football. He lied to Ónódi because he was afraid to die. During training the footballers subdue the Hungarian gendarmerie guarding them and try to escape. They are soon recaptured and told they will now probably face the death penalty. However, the Hungarian officer orders the Hungarian team to still play the match. At the beginning of the match Ónódi and his team are discouraged, as the Germans easily score three goals. The Hungarians succeed in scoring one goal and the first half ends 3-1 in favour of Germany. At the interval the Hungarian commander tells the Hungarian players that they might not be executed if they lose the match. The Hungarians refuse to believe this. At the beginning of the second half they score three goals. As a result, during the match, they are executed by the Germans.

== Cast ==
- Imre Sinkovits as Ónódi
- Dezső Garas as Steiner
- József Szendrő as Sergeant Rápity
- István Velenczei as Ferenczi
- Gyula Benkő as Sztepan
- János Görbe as Eberhardt
- Tibor Molnár as Rácz
- János Makláry as Sergeant Holup
- Siegfried Brachfeld as Captain Heilig
- Antal Farkas as Corporal Csorba
- János Rajz as Lipták
- László Márkus as Pogány
- János Koltai as Géza
- Zoltán Gera as Tankó

== See also ==
- List of association football films
