= Sándor Sára =

Hungarian cinematographer (1933–2019)

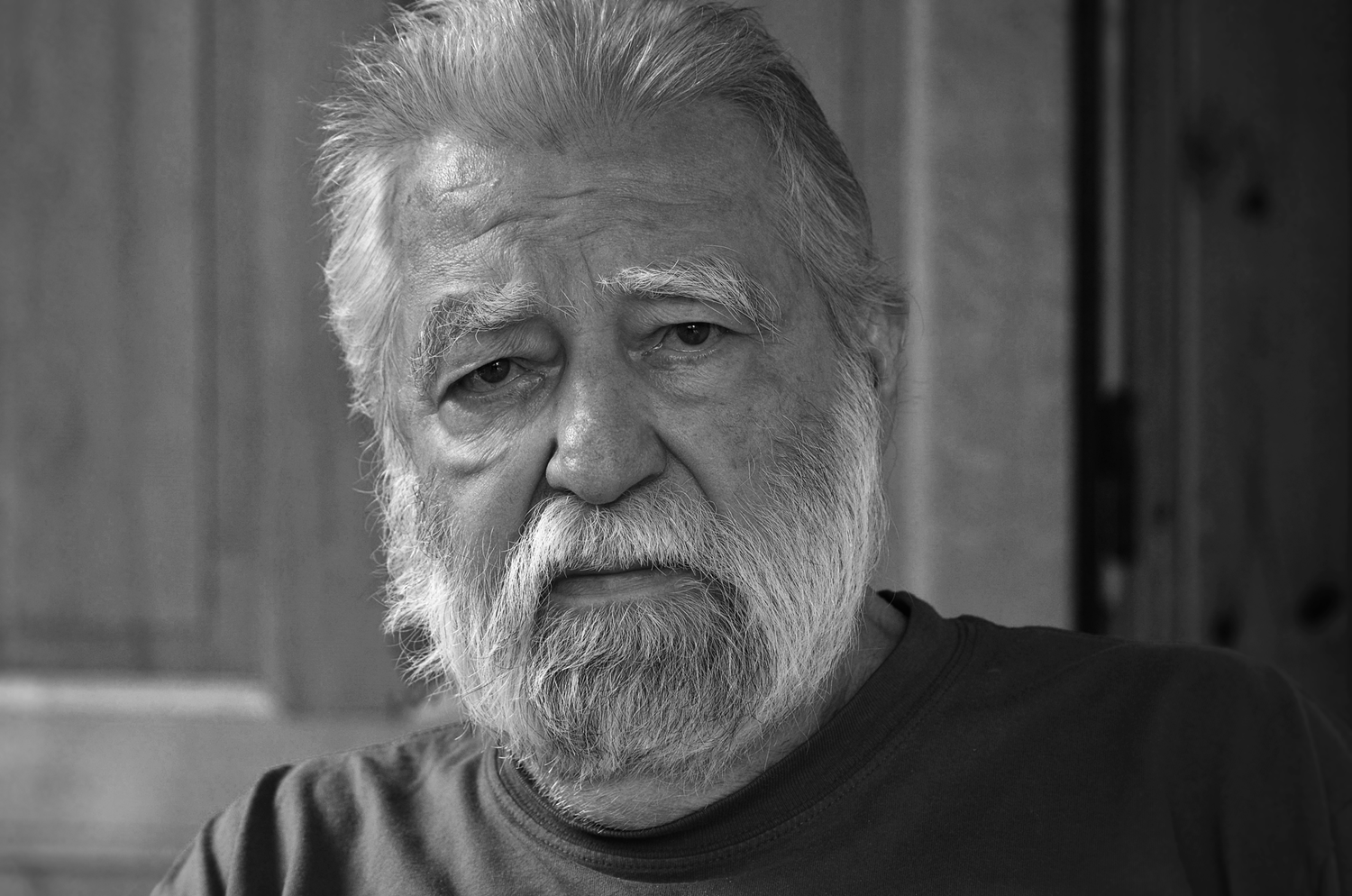
- Sándor Sára
- Born: 28 November 1933; Tura, Hungary
- Died: 22 September 2019 (aged 85); Budapest, Hungary
- Occupations: Cinematographer, film director
- Years active: 1957–2004

Sándor Sára (28 November 1933 – 22 September 2019) was a Hungarian cinematographer and film director. He directed 16 films between 1962 and 2004. His film The Upthrown Stone was listed to compete at the 1968 Cannes Film Festival, but the festival was cancelled due to the events of May 1968 in France.

== Selected filmography ==
- Ten Thousand Days (1967)
- The Upthrown Stone (1969)
- Szindbád (1971)
- 80 Hussars (1978)
