= Michael Howells =

English production designer (1957–2018)

- Born: 13 January 1957; Droxford, England
- Died: 19 July 2018 (aged 61); London, England
- Education: Gloucestershire College of Art and Design; Camberwell School of Arts and Crafts
- Occupation: Designer

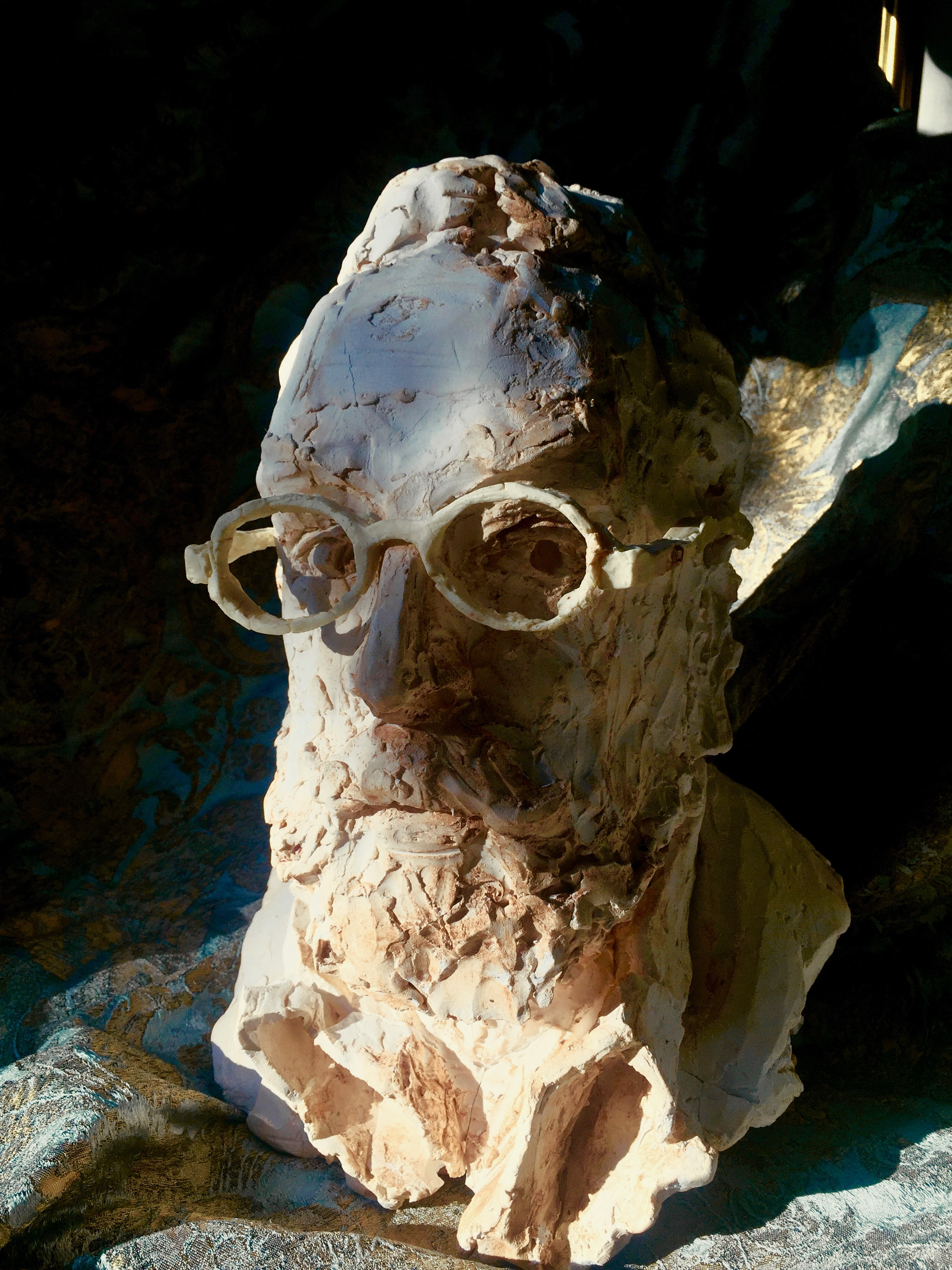
A bust of Michael Howells

Michael Dennis Howells (13 January 1957 – 19 July 2018) was an English art designer who worked across film, fashion, theatre and television.

== Early life ==
Michael Dennis Howells was born in Droxford, Hampshire, on 13 January 1957. At the time of his birth, his father worked in Malawi; the younger Howells spent his first years there in and New Zealand before returning to England and growing up in Gloucestershire, where both his parents were from. The family lived in Stroud. He took an early interest in art and design, and his father gave him a doll house so he could explore his interest in decoration. As a child, Howells decided to pursue design as a career after viewing an episode of Blue Peter featuring production designer Eileen Diss. He attended the Marling School, the Gloucestershire College of Art and Design, and the Camberwell School of Arts and Crafts.

== Career ==
Howells began his career stencilling floors for the Laura Ashley company before becoming a floral designer for parties and a set designer for magazine photoshoots. He entered the film industry as an Assistant Art Director on The Cook, the Thief, His Wife & Her Lover, where he worked with fashion designer Jean Paul Gaultier. Known particularly for his work in fashion with John Galliano, his work was seen in the films Orlando (1992), Emma (1995), and Nanny McPhee (2005). He was the production designer for the first two series of ITV's Victoria (2016–2017).

Howells collaborated with Galliano on his own label and at Dior, Christian Lacroix, Alexander McQueen on shows; photographers Mario Testino and Nick Knight on editorial and advertising including many editions of Vogue and advertising campaigns for Dior, Burberry and Dolce and Gabbana. He also designed Stephen Jones's award-winning V&A exhibition 'Hat's An Anthology by Stephen Jones' in 2009.

Film credits include Bright Young Things, Shackleton, About Time Too, and Miss Julie. Howells' theatre design credits include Ed Hall's acclaimed ‘Chariots of Fire’ [costumes], MSM/DV8 Physical Theatre at The Royal Court, 'Towards Poetry' for The Royal Ballet, 'Derdemon' for the Statsoper, Berlin, 'Julius Tomb’ for Mark Baldwin Company, and 'Constant Speed', celebrating Einstein's Centenary, for the Rambert Ballet, 2005, where he was made Associate Designer at Rambert in 2009.

Howells was the Creative Director behind the iconic Christmas trees at Claridges, where each year a fashion designer creates a tree. He created the inaugural tree in 2009 for John Galliano at Christian Dior, and in 2010 for Dior, 2019 for Sir Jony Ives and Marc Newson, and in 2017 for Karl Lagerfeld.

Until 2017, Howells was the creative director of the Port Eliot Festival.

He received a BAFTA nomination for his work on Shackleton.

== Personal life and death ==
Howells was in a relationship with composer David von Richthofen until von Richthofen's death in 1993.

Howells had Marfan syndrome, which contributed to his tall height of 6 feet 7 inches (2.01 m). He died from a heart condition related to Marfan syndrome on 19 July 2018, at Hammersmith Hospital in London.
