= Cantata (film) =

1963 Hungarian film by Miklós Jancsó

- Directed by: Miklós Jancsó
- Starring: Zoltán Latinovits, Andor Ajtay, Gyula Bodrogi
- Production company: Mafilm
- Release date: 28 February 1963 (Hungary)
- Language: Hungarian

Cantata (Oldás és kötés; lit. "Loosening and Tightening") is a 1963 Hungarian drama film directed by Miklós Jancsó and starring Zoltán Latinovits, Andor Ajtay and Gyula Bodrogi.

== Plot ==
After witnessing a senior doctor about whom he had doubts, bring back a patient from cardiac arrest, a young doctor with peasant roots comes to question his whole life when the doctor collapses from the struggle. Feeling that his progress from peasant's son to city doctor was made too smoothly, without a need to struggle or learn about life, and has made him arrogant and lonely, he comes to realise he has become gradually estranged from his own class and background after he returns to visit his hometown.

== Cast ==
- Zoltán Latinovits as Járom Ambrus dr.
- Andor Ajtay as Ádámfy professzor
- Béla Barsi as Ambrus apja
- Miklós Szakáts as Docens
- Gyula Bodrogi as Kiss Gyula
- Edit Domján as Márta, Ambrus szerelme
- Mária Medgyesi as Eta
- Gyöngyvér Demjén as Fiatal lány

== Analysis ==
The English title comes from Béla Bartók's Cantata Profana, whose story, heard as a radio broadcast in the film, echoes the conflict within the young doctor. It relates to nine sons raised by their father only to hunt, who know nothing of work, and spend all their time in the forest. The nine boys were turned magically into stags and, although recognised by their father, their altered natures mean they cannot return to live in their home.
