= Eszter Perenyi =

Hungarian violinist (born 1943)

Eszter Perenyi (born December 15, 1943) is a Budapest-born Hungarian violinist and Meritorious Artist of Hungary. She graduated from the Franz Liszt Academy of Music and then played under Erich Leinsdorf and István Kertész with the London Symphony Orchestra. She also performed abroad in such countries as Germany, Italy and Sweden and has taught at the Liszt Academy since 1975. In 2002 she became a recipient of the Bartók-Pásztory Prize and five years later was named a Merited Artist of the Republic of Hungary.

== Discography ==
Violin Sonatas. Handel, Tartini, Veracini
