= Ten Thousand Days (film) =

1967 film

- Directed by: Ferenc Kósa
- Written by: Sándor Csoóri; Imre Gyöngyössy; Ferenc Kósa
- Starring: Tibor Molnár
- Cinematography: Sándor Sára
- Edited by: Mária Szécsényi
- Production company: Mafilm
- Release date: 27 April 1967
- Running time: 110 minutes
- Country: Hungary
- Language: Hungarian

Ten Thousand Days (Hungarian: Tízezer nap) is a 1967 Hungarian drama film directed by Ferenc Kósa. It was entered into the 1967 Cannes Film Festival where Kósa won the award for Best Director. The film was chosen to be part of the Budapest Twelve, a list of Hungarian films considered the best in 1968.

== Plot ==
The film is set during the second wave of collectivization in Hungary in the 1960's, where István Széles and his wife (Tibor Molnár) live. Their son is about to go abroad, to the sea. Before his trip, his father tells him that he recently tried to commit suicide.

The story jumps back in time about ten thousand days, to the 1930s, and from there it tells the story of István Széles, Juli (Gyöngyi Bürös) and Fülöp Bánó (János Koltai) with smaller and larger time jumps. István, the aging farmer, marries Juli, who works as a servant for farmer Balogh, and then they choose the leftist Fülöp Bánó as the godfather of their child together. One New Year's Eve, István blows the roof of farmer Balogh's pigpen into the house, and István has to get down on his knees and apologize to the pig, whose little ones have frozen. The drunken Fülöp attacks his friend with a knife because of his servility, and his wife also gets involved in the fight. The couple then vows never to hit each other again. Later, Fülöp apologizes to István, but during the cubicle[landless peasant workers] strike, they come face to face again. István and Mihály Csere want to break the strike because they are starving and would take on work for half a penny. In the brick factory, the workers, including Fülöp, beat him and tie the “traitors” to the wheelbarrow. Later, István hits his wife again when she tries to buy a horse from traveling vendors, but Juli is unable to sell their ox. Before the war, Mama Széles sprinkles salt on the land – which the Széles couple plowed with their own power – ehat is a kinf of magic so that the war will not reach their house. During the recruitment at the barracks, István lies that he has eight children, so they don't take him as a soldier, unlike Fülöp, who had four children.

After the second world war, Fülöp returns to the village as a Communist agitator, and the big estate lands were distributed[the Communist did it at the beginning but later coerced the peasants(, kulaks) to join the community land companies=Agricultural service cooperatives or kolhoz in Russian]. The peasants, interpreting the idea of common property in their own way, immediately loot the granary, and Fülöp can barely stop them. We get a glimpse of the more cheerful side of the Rákosi era in the context of a May Day festival, and then, as a contrast, the scene in which a significant part of the grains harvested by István and his family is forcibly collected by the authority[to feed the urban areas]. Fülöp tries to make István understand why it is important to give their crops to the commons, but in the evening István and Mihály steal back their own share. The two men end up at the police station, and Mihály almost strangles the policeman (his brother-in-law), who manages to shoot the big man at the last moment. Since István did nothing to stop the fight, he is deported to a labor camp for 852 days around 1951–52 for complicity. Thanks to a prisoner, József Bócza, Juli is able to visit István, who tells her husband everything that has happened in recent years, including how Fülöp helped their son get into university.

In 1956, the revolution broke out. A gang of "counter-revolutionist" with weapons put Fülöp Bánó, the policeman, and two other communists in the lake to be executed. The leader of the revolutionaries asks István for advice on how to humiliate the communists. István replies that they respect each other. “He said this revolution is ours. The one with the gun is right. […] Strangers have never come to this village to hoe. They always come to take action,” he says. The revolutionary hands over the machine gun to István, but the man does not shoot any of them. The "counter-revolutionaries" then take the four men to the church, warning the villagers that anyone who dares to defend them will be shot. The leader makes the communists kneel against the wall, but Fülöp does not kneel or turn his back on him. Finally, the man executes everyone except Fülöp and leaves the village with the "counter-revolutionaries". István, lying that Juli is dying, sends a letter to his son, who, ashamed at home, vows not to return to university to study.

In the summer, while picking potatoes, Juli falls ill in the scorching sun, and Pista almost hits his father with a hoe. He talks about his feelings with Fülöp, who tells him that he has wanted a cooperative[Agricultural service cooperatives] union for 15 years because "this dirty land is making everyone stupid". Pista urges him to make it happen, to do something. Finally, he talks to his father, who threatens to strangle him if he doesn't go back to university. Influenced by Fülöp, István tries to persuade the other farmers to join the union, who don't want to hand over their land, so he backs down too. István visits his son in Budapest, who is also in favor of union. Fülöp finally convinces István by calling him a coward and by arguing that union would create a world "where things are not important, but people". István signs the paper necessary for union and then hangs himself.

István survives, and the film returns to the present. The film ends with Pista's[István's son] narration, who finally reaches the sea, in which he talks about how the land is not as important to him as it was to his ancestors, because he feels that all land is his own.

== Cast ==
- Tibor Molnár as Széles István
- Gyöngyi Bürös as Juli
- János Koltai as Fülöp Bánó
- János Rajz as Balogh
- János Görbe as Bócza József
- Sándor Siménfalvy as Sándor bácsi (as Siménfalvi Sándor)
- Anna Nagy as Mihály felesége
- László Nyers as Csere Mihály
- Péter Haumann as Rendõr
- Ida Siménfalvy as Széles mama (as Siménfalvi Ida)
- István Széles
- András Kozák as Ifj.Széles István
- Nóra Káldi as A rendõr felesége

== How the film was made ==
“The pre story of making Ten Thousand Days begins when […] the idea arose that the young generation of the sixties or one of its members should make a feature film about the organization of production (Agricultural) cooperatives and the socialist reorganization of Hungarian agriculture.” According to several sources, the film’s “starting point idea came directly from János Kádár." An elderly peasant told Kádár that during the 1950s’ first collectivisation, he wanted to hang himself, but seeing the developments, he was glad he didn’t. György Aczél proposed the idea of the film to the young people of the Balázs Béla Studio in the early sixties. The gesture of offering this politically important topic to the young was part of the film political games of the era. “Aczél wanted to build on new people, which is why he sought out young people.” He expected that if he gave young people the opportunity to contribute to the production of a film intended to be representative of the era’s demagoguery,[6] the young creators would repay his generosity with their loyalty to the system. Despite all these modifications, it cannot be said that the film’s basic tone is “Kádár’s consolidation and the affirmation of socialist agriculture.”[11] The film’s 2-year ban is due, among other things, to the fact that a film about a similar theme – but focusing on a communist committed to de-politicization – called Twenty Hours was also made in 1965, and “Kósa’s film and Fábri’s film could have been counterparts to each other – if they had been shown at the same time [...] that’s why they were played off against each other.” After the canonization of Twenty Hours, there was no point in keeping the film in a box anymore, and moreover, by then the de-politicization had also taken place, so it didn’t really matter politically.

The 1967 premiere was also forced by the fact that news of the film somehow reached the Cannes Festival, and “the French sent an official note to the Hungarian state authorities stating that if Ten Thousand Days was not sent to the Cannes Festival, then they would no longer have any claim to the participation of Hungarian films.”[8] For this reason, not the originally planned Herskó film, Szevasz Vera, was sent to the competition, but Ten Thousand Days.

Ten Thousand Days is a grandiose film ballad by Ferenc Kósa that covers a history of nearly 30 years. The film takes place in three eras, the landlord(feudal) system of the 1940s, the hardline communism of the 1950s and the de-industrialization of the 1960s. It sings of the tragedy of the peasantry, who gained their own land after the World War and were then deprived of it with the establishment of production(Agricultural) cooperatives. Ten Thousand Days shows with a force that is still valid today what the peasant way of life meant, how the fate of people depended on the land, which they were forced to cultivate, but this land also gave meaning to their lives. Sándor Sára's widescreen images show the Hungarian landscape as beautiful and barren, indifferent at the same time. The wide-composed shots not only condense the fate of the peasantry, but also commemorate the peasant way of life that was lost on the border between tradition and modernization. In the background, factory chimneys tower, trains rumble, and a hydroglobe (water tower) arrives in the village, making the peasant houses seem even more outdated: one of the last mementos of a lifestyle and values trampled under communism.

== Sources ==
- Varga Balázs: Filmirányítás, gyártástörténet és politika Magyarországon 1957-1963. Doktori disszertáció. Budapest, 2008. ELTE BTK Történettudományok Doktori Iskola, Társadalom- és Gazdaságtörténeti Doktori Program. pp. 133–145
