= Ferenc Kósa =

Hungarian film director and screenwriter (1937–2018)

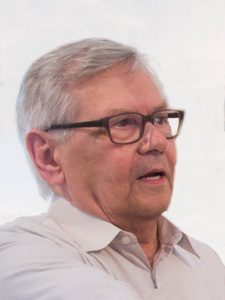
- Ferenc Kósa in 2015
- Born: 21 November 1937; Nyíregyháza, Hungary
- Died: 12 December 2018 (aged 81); Budapest, Hungary
- Occupations: Film director, screenwriter
- Years active: 1961–1988

Ferenc Kósa (21 November 1937 – 12 December 2018) was a Hungarian film director and screenwriter. He directed thirteen films between 1961 and 1988. He won the award for Best Director at the 1967 Cannes Film Festival for the film Ten Thousand Days.

== Selected filmography ==
- The Upthrown Stone (1969)
- Ten Thousand Days (1967)
- Hószakadás ("Snowfall") (1974)
