= Donna Butterworth =

American actress and singer (1956–2018)

- Born: Donna Lee Butterworth; February 23, 1956; Philadelphia, Pennsylvania, U.S.
- Died: March 6, 2018 (aged 62); Hilo, Hawaii, U.S.
- Occupations: Actress; singer
- Years active: 1965–1967
- Known for: Paradise, Hawaiian Style; The Family Jewels

Donna Lee Butterworth (February 23, 1956 – March 6, 2018) was an American actress and singer, best known for starring opposite Elvis Presley in the 1966 musical comedy Paradise, Hawaiian Style, when she was 10 years old.

Butterworth's career as an actor and performer was brief; however, during that short time, she received critical acclaim.

== Early life ==
Donna Lee Butterworth was born in Philadelphia, Pennsylvania on February 23, 1956, the daughter of Isabella "Isa" Chalfant. She had one sibling, a brother named William "Bill" Butterworth.

Butterworth's family lived in Pennsylvania for the first three years of her life before they moved to Hawaii, where Butterworth remained until her death. She learned to play the ukulele soon after moving to Hawaii.

== Career ==
Performing Hawaiian music from an early age, Donna gave concerts around the islands, performed with Don Ho, and appeared on The Dean Martin Show, The Danny Kaye Show and The Andy Williams Show. and on the Ronnie Howard show. She was nominated for a Golden Globe Award for her role in the 1965 film The Family Jewels. In 1966, she appeared opposite Elvis Presley, singing several duets with him in Paradise, Hawaiian Style. Little Leatherneck, an unsold sitcom pilot film in which she appeared, aired on ABC television as part of the 7-week 1966 series Summer Fun.

Butterworth ultimately left acting after her brief stardom; she continued in the entertainment business as a singer.

== Death ==
Butterworth died on March 6, 2018, at a medical center in Hilo, Hawaii, after a "long unspecified illness." She was 62 years old.

== Filmography ==
=== Film ===
Year	Title	Role	Notes
1965	The Family Jewels	Donna Peyton	
1966	Paradise, Hawaiian Style	Jan Kohana	

=== Television ===
Year	Title	Role	Notes
1966	Summer Fun	Cindy Fenton	Episode: "Little Leatherneck"
1966	The Danny Kaye Show	Herself	Episode: #4.1
1966	The Dean Martin Show	Herself	Episode: #1.20
1967	Disney's Wonderful World of Color	Laura-Kate Brackney	Episodes: "A Boy Called Nuthin': Part 1", "A Boy Called Nuthin': Part 2"
