= Ádánd =

- Village
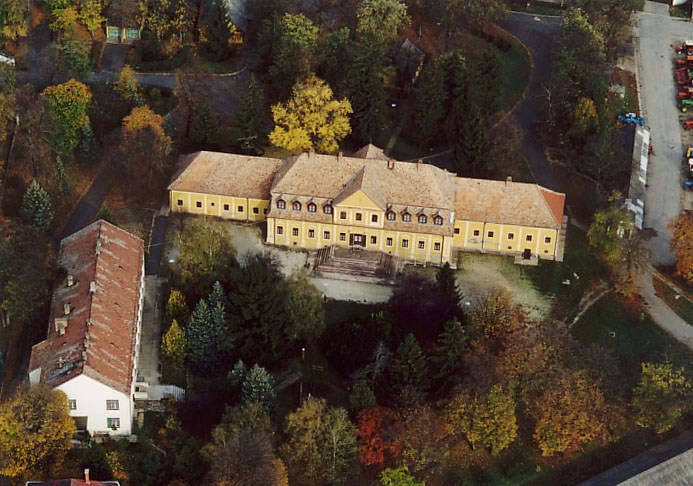
- Csapody Mansion

- Coat of arms

- Location of Somogy country in Hungary

- Location of Ádánd
- Coordinates: 46.85725°N 18.153411°E
- Country: Hungary
- Region: Southern Transdanubia
- County: Somogy
- District: Siófok
- RC Diocese: Kaposvár

Area
  - Total: 29.52 km^{2} (11.40 sq mi)

Population (2017)
  - Total: 2,107
  - Density: 71.38/km^{2} (184.9/sq mi)
- Demonym: ádándi
- Time zone: UTC+1 (CET)
  - Summer (DST): UTC+2 (CEST)
- Postal code: 8653
- Area code: (+36) 84
- NUTS 3 code: HU232
- MP: Mihály Witzmann (Fidesz)
- Website: Ádánd Online

Ádánd is a Hungarian village of 2,416 inhabitants (data from 2001) located in Somogy, Hungary, in the south side of lake Balaton.

== Etymology ==
The name of the village derived from the person name Ádám with the diminutive suffix -d.

== Location ==
Located next to the Kis-Koppány river, the nearest town is Siófok (12 km). Its railway station is accessible along the Kaposvár-Siófok railway line .

== History ==
Ádánd is a town of Árpád-era . His name was first mentioned in 1265 as Ádámd in the ancient estate document of the family branch of the Szalók. In 1460 Imre Ugron, 1536 Imre Perneszy and Ugron Bernas were the landlords. In 1572, during Turkish times, it belonged to the Endrédi náhijí (district) and at that time there were seven, in 1582–1583, 12 taxable houses. In 1665, the grandson of Imre Perneszy, János Perneszy's local landowners, János Salomvári, and in 1669, evangelized them to Gergely Vizalli's Tallián. In 1695 Ferencné Babócsay, Anna Julianna Pernesy, and Zsigmond Perneszi of the Austro-Hungarians, the grandchildren of János Perneszy, mentioned earlier, were the holders. It was completely destroyed during the Turkish occupation. It began to populate in the 17th century, when it returned ad a public village.

In 1715 there were only 11 households in Ádánd. In 1715 the widow of Babócsay Ferencz, 1726–1733 by the Perneszy family, in 1767 by János Tallián, and in 1835 by the Csapody de Zalalövő family, and at Tallián de Vizek, Botka and Szelestey, and Zeke, Terstyánszky, Horváth and the Rosty de Barkócz families were the landlords. 1802. On May 24, Gábor Csapody (1760–1825) paid 14,000 forints to his relatives, the heirs of the Farkas de Boldogfa family, and reached a peaceful agreement with Ferenc Farkas de Boldogfa (1742–1807), master prebendary of Veszprém, László Tuboly Tubolyszegh ( 1756–1828 ) Erzsébet Farkas' s husband, and other brothers and sisters of the family. In fact, he bought the property from the Pernesky ancestors of Dionysius, then still undivided and possessed by several family members. One landowner was Boldizsár Tallián de Vizek (1781–1834) at the beginning of the 19th century, somogyi alispán. From his swinging castle, Csapody's mansion and his ancestor, Count Wickenburg and then the Tallián family, from 1856 to 1857, and later on the family of the Bálványosi Satzger, took over from the young man's father-in-law Csapody Pál (1808–1859).

According to László Szita the settlement was completely Hungarian in the 18th century.

In 1831 cholera destroyed the majority of the population.

At the beginning of March 1910, 32 houses burned down.

At the beginning of the 20th century, Géza Satzger (1917–1943), idolater had a larger estate and mansion here, built by Pál Csapody.

== Demographics ==
During the 2011 census, 89.3% of the population were Hungarians, 2.4% Gypsies and 0.9% Germans (9.9% did not declare, because of double identities the total may be larger than 100%) . The religious distribution was the following: Roman Catholics 49.4%, Reformed 15.8%, Evangelic 0.8%, Greek Catholics 0.2%, Denominated 12% (20% declined).

== Sights ==
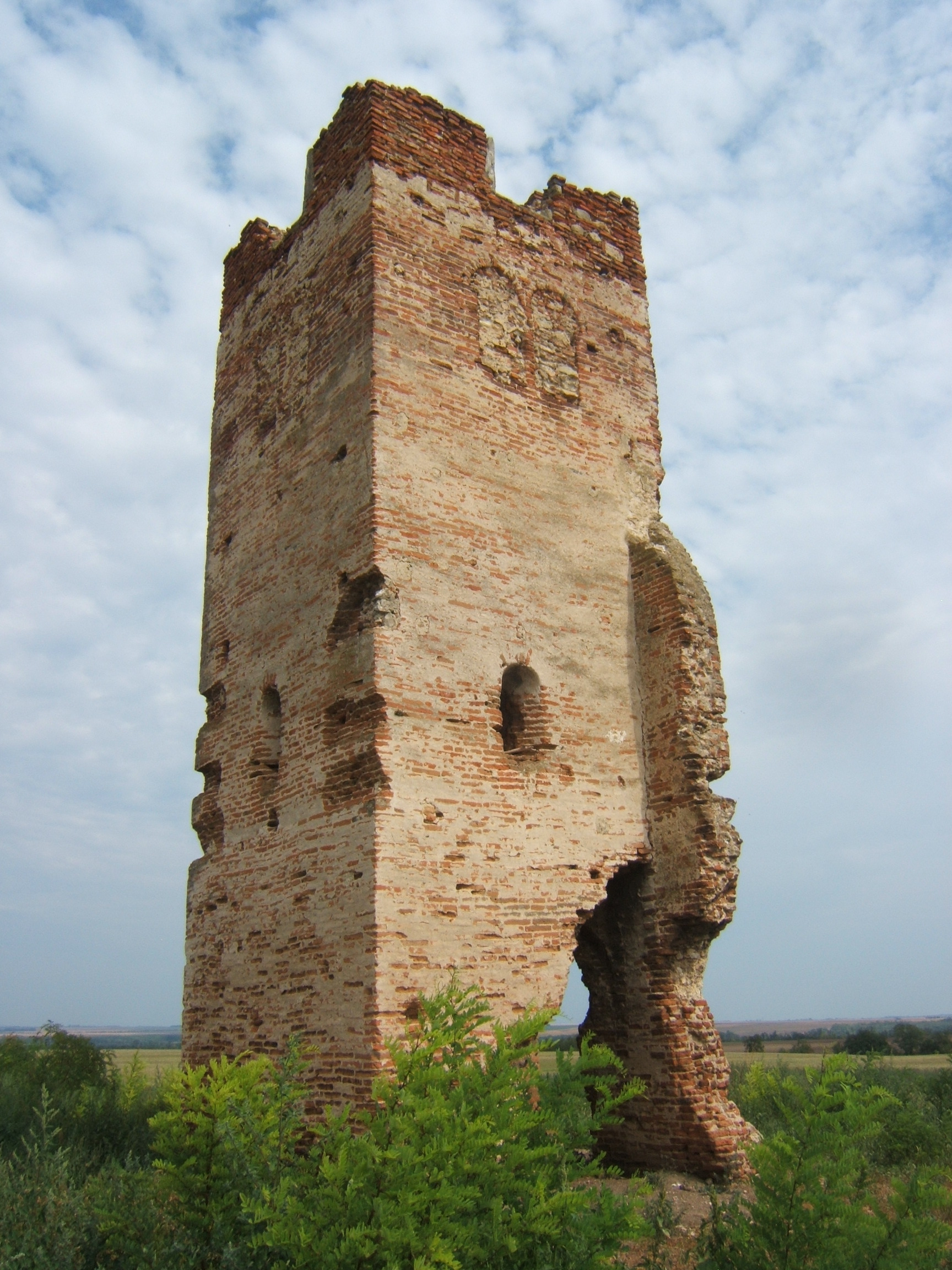
Ruins of the Church of Hetye

- The church ruin of Hetye (also known as Töröhagyás, Romanesque and Gothic style). The church was in the former village of Hetye (Ketye), with three more settlements: Pöse (Pesze), Elyas (Villa Elyas) and Kisfalud, and a land called Sövény (Terra Suwen).
- Csapody-kastély built by Pál Csapody in 1835, classic late Baroque style. Built between 1946 and 2007, he was employed by the Agricultural Vocational Training Institute.
- Tallián Mansion - The baroque mansion of the Viziai Tallián family built in the 18th century. Today it is a primary school.
- Roman Catholic Church (baroque style, 1747). In its garden is the statue of Immaculata (Immaculate Virgin) dating from 1816.

Reformed Church (Late Baroque, 1828).
