= Michael Seymour (production designer) =

British production designer

- Born: 1932; Southampton, Hampshire, England, UK
- Died: 9 December 2018 (aged 86)
- Occupation: Production designer
- Years active: 1967–2006

Michael Edmund Seymour (1932 – 9 December 2018) was a British production designer. He won a BAFTA and was nominated for an Academy Award in the category Best Art Direction for his work on the 1979 film Alien. Seymour died on 9 December 2018 at the age of 86.
