= Paradise, Hawaiian Style =

1966 film by Michael D. Moore

- Theatrical release poster
- Directed by: Michael D. Moore
- Screenplay by: Allan Weiss; Anthony Lawrence
- Story by: Allan Weiss
- Produced by: Hal B. Wallis
- Starring: Elvis Presley; Suzanna Leigh; James Shigeta; Donna Butterworth
- Cinematography: W. Wallace Kelley
- Edited by: Warren Low
- Music by: Joseph J. Lilley
- Production companies: Paramount Pictures; Hal Wallis Productions
- Distributed by: Paramount Pictures
- Release date: June 9, 1966 (USA)
- Running time: 91 minutes
- Country: United States
- Language: English
- Budget: $2 million
- Box office: $2.5 million

Paradise, Hawaiian Style is a 1966 American musical comedy film directed by Michael Moore and starring Elvis Presley. It was the third and final motion picture that Presley filmed in Hawaii. The film reached #40 on the Variety weekly box office chart, earning $2.5 million in theaters. In agreeing to do this film, Presley's manager, Colonel Tom Parker, was hoping to replicate the success of Presley's 1961 film, Blue Hawaii.

== Plot ==
Rick Richards returns to his home in Hawaii after being fired from his job as an airline pilot. He and his buddy Danny Kohana go into the helicopter charter business together. But Rick's reckless flying and his careless flirting with local women may cost Rick the business and Danny his home. This tendency seems to get in the way of their secretary, Judy "Friday" Hudson and Rick getting together.

Disaster looms as Danny becomes overdue on a flight after Rick has been grounded by government officials. Rick must decide if he should risk losing his license forever by going to look for his friend.

== Cast ==
- Elvis Presley as Rick Richards
- Suzanna Leigh as Judy "Friday" Hudson
- James Shigeta as Danny Kohana
- Jan Shepard as Betty Kohana
- Philip Ahn as Moki Kaimana
- Donna Butterworth as Jan Kohana
- Marianna Hill as Lani Kaimana
- Irene Tsu as Pua
- Linda Wong as Lehua Kawena
- Julie Parrish as Joanna
- Red West as fighter in bar (uncredited)
- Grady Sutton as Mr. Cubberson

== Production ==
Principal photography in Paradise, Hawaiian Style began in Hawaii on July 27, 1965 (with the working title of Hawaiian Paradise) and finished on September 29 in Los Angeles.

Major scenes in both Blue Hawaii (1961) and this film were shot on the island of Kauaʻi, with the Coco Palms Resort prominently featured. The famous resort was destroyed by Hurricane Iniki in 1992 and never rebuilt.

Some scenes were filmed above, at and around the Polynesian Cultural Center on O'ahu.

Around the official wrap on production, Presley met Tom Jones, who visited the set, and The Beatles, who visited Presley's Bel Air home a few weeks after production was completed. Presley was still the biggest singing star and top actor in the world at this time, with his salary for every film being a million dollars and half the profits which $1.25 million for Hawaiian Style. Presley made $2.25 million from this film.

== Reception ==
Released in June 1966, Paradise, Hawaiian Style, despite its "stunning aerial photography", "inspired a collective yawn" with film critics. The New York Times film reviewer Vincent Canby compared the film to the formulaic 1930s musicals that Bing Crosby used to star in, concluding that it was "all harmless and forgettable." Kevin Thomas of the Los Angeles Times called it "pleasant hot-weather diversion. Pretty much the usual Elvis Presley formula of songs and romance, this Paramount release ... has the added bonus of lush tropical scenery in color. And Elvis, as always, remains [a] relaxed, enjoyable entertainer."

Variety called the film "a gaily-begarbed and flowing musical," with the Hawaii setting seldom before having been "utilized to such lush advantage." The Monthly Film Bulletin wrote, "This is Elvis Presley right back in the old rut, parading his talents as a man of action while women swoon at his passage. The script is rather worse than routine, and the songs and choreography are undistinguished; which leaves very little but Wallace Kelley's colourful photography of the strictly tourist-eye view of the islands." (Note: Aerial photography was completed from a Bell 47 helicopter flown by James W. Gavin.)

== See also ==
- List of American films of 1966
