= Gyula Krúdy =

Hungarian writer (1878–1933)

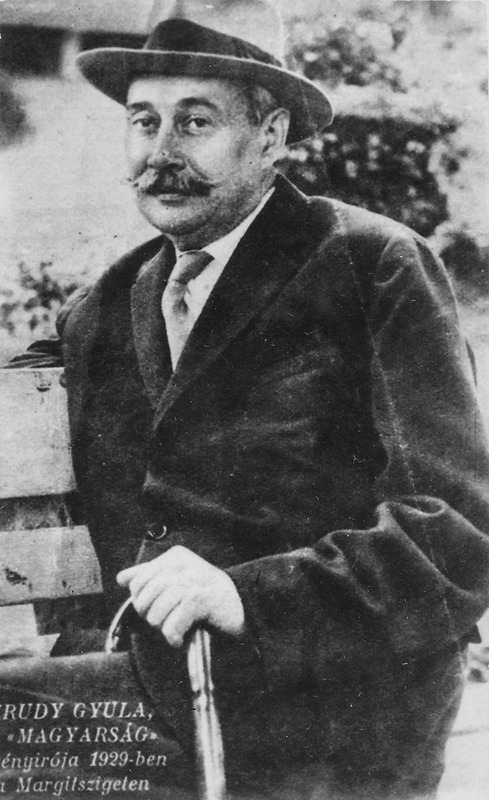
- Born: 21 October 1878; Nyíregyháza, Austria-Hungary (now Hungary)
- Died: 12 May 1933 (aged 54); Óbuda, Hungary
- Occupations: Writer, journalist

Gyula Krúdy (21 October 1878 – 12 May 1933) was a Hungarian writer and journalist.

== Biography ==
Gyula Krúdy was born in Nyíregyháza, Austria-Hungary. His father was a lawyer and his mother was a maid working for the Krúdy family; his parents did not marry until Gyula was 17 years old. In his teens, Krúdy published newspaper pieces and began writing short stories. Although his father wanted him to become a lawyer, Krúdy worked as an editor at provincial newspapers in Debrecen and Nagyvárad for several years, then moved to Budapest in 1896. He was disinherited, but supported his wife (also a writer) and three children through the publication of short stories, along with novels that were almost always serialized in daily papers and periodicals.

Sinbad's Youth, published in 1911, proved a success, and Krúdy used the character, a man who shared the name of the hero of the Arabian Nights, many times throughout his career. Another alter ego, Kazmer Rezeda, is the hero of half a dozen novels, including The Crimson Coach (1913), English translation by Paul Tabori published in 1965. Krúdy's last collection of stories, Life Is a Dream, has also appeared in an English translation by John Batki (Penguin Books, 2010).

Krúdy's novels about Budapest were popular during the First World War but afterward he was often broke due to difficulties in getting his works published, exacerbated by excessive drinking and smoking. His first marriage fell apart. In 1919, Krúdy enthousiastically welcomed the short-lived Hungarian Soviet Republic. He spent some time travelling around the country and writing reports about its social transformation, which were compiled into a state-published pamphlet. His second marriage produced one daughter, Zsuzsa, who later edited several volumes of her father's work. In the late 1920s and early 1930s, his health declined and his readership dwindled. He died in 1933.

== Awards and legacy ==
Krudy received the Baumgarten Prize.

In the years after his death, his works were largely forgotten until 1940, when Hungarian novelist Sándor Márai published Sinbad Comes Home, a fictionalized account of Krúdy's last days. This book's success brought Krúdy's works back to the Hungarian public. The edition of his collected works published by Szépirodalmi (Budapest, 1978–1989) ran to twenty volumes. There is a permanent exhibit on Krúdy's life at the Hungarian Museum of Commerce and Tourism, which is located in a building in Óbuda in which he lived for the last three years of his life.

== Selected bibliography ==
=== Translated into English ===
- The Adventures of Sinbad (1911, published in English in 1998 by Central European University Press), Hungarian title: Szindbád ifjúsága és utazásai ISBN 978-963-9116-12-2
- The Crimson Coach (1913, published in English translation by P. Tabori in 1967) Hungarian title: A vörös postakocsi
- Sunflower (1918, published in English in 2007), Hungarian title: Napraforgó ISBN 1-59017-186-1
- Ladies Day (1919, published in English in 2007), Hungarian title: Asszonyságok díja ISBN 978-963-13-5549-9
- Blessed Days of my Youth (1930, English translation by John Bátki, Corvina Books, Budapest, 2016), Hungarian title: Boldogult úrfikoromban ISBN 9789631363760
- Life Is a Dream : Ten Stories (1931, English translation by John Bátki, Penguin Books, 2010), Hungarian title: Az élet álom ISBN 9780141193038
- Knight of the Cordon Bleu (1931, English translation by John Bátki, Corvina Books, Budapest, 2013), Hungarian title: A Kékszalag hőse ISBN 9789631361261
- The Charmed Life of Kázmér Rezeda: A Novel of Budapest in the Good Old Days (1933, English translation by John Bátki, Corvina Books, Budapest, 2011), Hungarian title: Rezeda Kázmér szép élete ISBN 978-963-13-6039-4
- The Knight of Dreams. The Journeys of Sindbad and Other Stories (selections of Krúdy's stories, translated by Eszter Molnár, Noran Books, Budapest, 1999) ISBN 9639048526
- Krudy's Chronicles (selections of Krúdy's journalism, translated by John Batki, published in English in 2000 by Central European University Press) ISBN 978-963-9116-78-8
- Mrs Kleofas’s Rooster: Three Novellas, translated by John Batki (Seagull Books, forthcoming)
