= 19th Venice International Film Festival =

Italian film festival in 1958

- Location: Venice, Italy
- Founded: 1932
- Awards: Golden Lion: Rickshaw Man
- Festival date: 24 August – 7 September 1958
- Website: Website

Venice Film Festival chronology
- 20th 18th

The 19th annual Venice International Film Festival was held from 24 August to 7 September 1958.

No OCIC Award was given this year due to the "unusual immorality" of the films.

== Jury ==
- Jean Grémillon, French filmmaker - Jury President
- Carlos Fernández Cuenca, Spanish
- Piero Gadda Conti, Italian film critic
- Hidemi Ina, Japanese
- Alberto Lattuada, Italian filmmaker
- Friedrich Luft, German theatre critic
- Sergei Vasilyev, Soviet filmmaker

== Official Sections ==
The following films were selected to be screened:

=== Main Competition ===
| English title | Original title | Director(s) | Production country |
|---|---|---|---|
| At Midnight | Éjfélkor | György Révész | Hungary |
| The Ballad of Narayama | 楢山節考 | Keisuke Kinoshita | Japan |
| The Black Orchid | | Martin Ritt | United States |
| Eighth Day of the Week | Ósmy dzien tygodnia | Aleksander Ford | Poland |
| God's Little Acre | | Anthony Mann | United States |
| The Horse's Mouth | | Ronald Neame | United Kingdom |
| In Case of Adversity | En cas de malheur | Claude Autant-Lara | France |
| The Lovers | Les amants | Louis Malle | France |
| Night Light | Nattens ljus | Lars-Eric Kjellgren | Sweden |
| One Life | Une vie | Alexandre Astruc | France |
| Otar's Widow | Otaraant qvrivi | Mikheil Chiaureli | Soviet Union |
| Rickshaw Man | 無法松の一生 | Hiroshi Inagaki | Japan |
| Rosemary | Das Mädchen Rosemarie | Rolf Thiele | West Germany |
| La sfida | | Francesco Rosi | Italy |
| The Wolf Trap | Vlcí jáma | Jiří Weiss | Czechoslovakia |

=== Informativa ===
| English title | Original title | Director(s) | Production country |
|---|---|---|---|
| Ajantrik | | Ritwik Ghatak | India |
| Angel in a Taxi | Ballerina e Buon Dio | Antonio Leonviola | Italy |
| Le Beau Serge | | Claude Chabrol | France |
| Behind a Long Wall | Detrás de un largo muro | Lucas Demare | Argentina |
| Big Deal on Madonna Street | I soliti ignoti | Mario Monicelli | Italy |
| Big and Small | Veliki i mali | Vladimir Pogacic | Yugoslavia |
| Le Bourgeois Gentilhomme | | Roger Coggio | France |
| Brink of Life | Nära livet | Ingmar Bergman | Sweden |
| Bugles of Fear | Los clarines del miedo | Antonio Fernández-Román | Spain |
| Bundfald | | Palle Kjærulff-Schmidt, Robert Saaskin | Denmark |
| The Communist | Коммунист | Yuli Raizman | Soviet Union |
| Crni Biseri | | Toma Janic | Yugoslavia |
| The Defiant Ones | | Stanley Kramer | United States |
| The Glass Tower | Der gläserne Turm | Harald Braun | West Germany |
| At Midnight | Éjfélkor | György Révész | Hungary |
| The Kidnapper | El secuestrador | Leopoldo Torre Nilsson | Argentina |
| Eroica | | Andrzej Munk | Poland |
| Giants and Toys | 巨人と玩具 | Yasuzô Masumura | Japan |
| Un giorno in Europa | | Emilio Marsili | Italy |
| The Goddess | | John Cromwell | United States |
| The House Under the Rocks | Ház a sziklák alatt | Károly Makk, György Hintsch | Hungary |
| The Idiot | Идиот | Ivan Pyryev | Soviet Union |
| The Island of Silence | Το νησί της σιωπής | Lila Kourkoulakou | Greece |
| Italia in Patagonia | | Guido Guerrasio | Italy |
| Little Cannon | Pezzo, capopezzo e capitano | Wolfgang Staudte | Italy, Germany |
| Orders to Kill | | Anthony Asquith | United Kingdom |
| Spanish Carousel | Carosello spagnolo | Gian Rocco, Salvatore Rosso, Pino Serpi | Italia |
| St. Louis Blues | | Allen Reisner | United States |
| Weddings and Babies | | Morris Engel | United States |
| Wild Strawberries | Smultronstället | Ingmar Bergman | Sweden |

== Official Awards ==
- Golden Lion: Rickshaw Man by Hiroshi Inagaki
- Special Jury Prize:
  - The Lovers by Louis Malle
  - La sfida by Francesco Rosi
- Volpi Cup for Best Actor: Alec Guinness for The Horse's Mouth
- Volpi Cup for Best Actress: Sophia Loren for The Black Orchid

== Independent Awards ==
=== New Cinema Award ===
- Best Film: Vlcí jáma by Jiří Weiss
- Best Actress: Jeanne Moreau for The Lovers

=== San Giorgio Prize ===
- La sfida by Francesco Rosi

=== FIPRESCI Prize ===
- Vlcí jáma by Jiří Weiss

=== Pasinetti Award ===
- Rosemary by Rolf Thiele
  - Parallel Sections:
  - Wild Strawberries by Ingmar Bergman
  - Weddings and Babies by Morris Engel

=== Italian Cinema Clubs Award ===
- Weddings and Babies by Morris Engel
