= What a Night! (1958 film) =

1958 film

- Directed by: György Révész
- Written by: Iván Boldizsár; Sándor Illés; György Révész
- Produced by: László Szirtes
- Starring: Kálmán Latabár; Klári Tolnay; Éva Ruttkai
- Cinematography: Ottó Forgács
- Edited by: Sándor Zákonyi
- Music by: András Bágya
- Production company: Mafilm
- Release date: 25 September 1958
- Running time: 81 minutes
- Country: Hungary
- Language: Hungarian

What a Night! (Hungarian: Micsoda éjszaka!) is a 1958 Hungarian comedy film directed by György Révész and starring Kálmán Latabár, Klári Tolnay and Éva Ruttkai. It was shot at the Hunnia Studios in Budapest. The film's sets were designed by the art director Melinda Vásáry.

== Cast ==
- Kálmán Latabár as Törös Antal
- Klári Tolnay as Karsai Klára
- Éva Ruttkai as Vera
- Tivadar Horváth as Vili
- László Kazal as Betöró
- István Rozsos as Csapodi Tomi, grafikus
- Zsuzsa Gordon as Csapodi menyasszonya
- Ferenc Zenthe as Suhajda, taxisoför
- József Gáti as Betörõ
- György Bárdy as Burglar
- Márta Fónay as Huffnágelné Amál
- Ernő Szabó as Huffnágel Jenõ
- Erzsi Lengyel
- Sándor Peti as Matyi bácsi
- Nusi Somogyi
- Kálmán Rózsahegyi
- Lajos Mányai as Frédi, házigazda
- Mária Keresztessy as Frédi felesége
- Oszkár Ascher
- Sándor Pethes as Dr. Gonda Mihály
- Gábor Mádi Szabó as Földvári százados

== Bibliography ==
- Homoródy, József. Magyar film, 1948-1963. Filmtudományi Intézet, 1964.
- Rîpeanu, Bujor. (ed.) International Directory of Cinematographers, Set- and Costume Designers in Film: Hungary (from the beginnings to 1988). Saur, 1981.
