= László Szirtes =

Hungarian film producer

- Born: 27 October 1904; Lápafő, Austria-Hungary
- Died: 27 March 1959 (aged 54); Prague, Czechoslovakia
- Occupations: Producer, production manager
- Years active: 1934–1959 (film)

László Szirtes (27 October 1904 – 27 March 1959) was a Hungarian actor and film producer. During World War II he was excluded from work due to the country's Anti-Jewish Laws. After the end of the war he was established as a production manager at the Hunnia Studios in Budapest, working on a variety of films during the post-war era. From 1956 he headed one of the three filmmaking groups of the state-controlled Mafilm alongside Lajos Óvári and Jenõ Katona. He is the father of the theatre director Tamás Szirtes.

== Selected filmography ==
- There Are Exceptions (1937)
- Janos the Valiant (1939)
- The Siege of Beszterce (1948)
- Somewhere in Europe (1948)
- Storm (1952)
- West Zone (1952)
- Under the City (1953)
- Relatives (1954)
- Springtime in Budapest (1955)
- The Bridge of Life (1956)
- Fever (1957)
- Tale on the Twelve Points (1957)
- At Midnight (1957)
- What a Night! (1958)

== Bibliography ==
- Kulcsár, István Karcsai & Veress József. Magyar filmkalauz: negyven év száz magyar nagyjátékfilmje. Magyar Filmintézet, 1985. p. 86.
