= Springtime in Budapest =

1955 film

- Directed by: Félix Máriássy
- Written by: Ferenc Karinthy; Gábor Thurzó
- Based on: Springtime in Budapest by Ferenc Karinthy
- Produced by: László Szirtes
- Starring: Tibor Molnár; Miklós Gábor; Zsuzsa Gordon
- Cinematography: György Illés
- Edited by: Mária Szécsényi
- Music by: Imre Vincze
- Production company: Mafilm
- Release date: 2 April 1955
- Running time: 109 minutes
- Country: Hungary
- Language: Hungarian

Springtime in Budapest (Hungarian: Budapesti tavasz) is a 1955 Hungarian war drama film directed by Félix Máriássy and starring Tibor Molnár, Miklós Gábor and Zsuzsa Gordon. It was shot at the Hunnia Studios in Budapest. The film's sets were designed by the art director Mátyás Varga. It was based on a 1953 novel of the same title by Ferenc Karinthy.

== Cast ==
- Tibor Molnár as Gazsó Bertalan
- Miklós Gábor as Pintér Zoltán
- Zsuzsa Gordon as Jutka
- Gábor Rajnay as Turnovszky
- Mária Mezei as Turnovszkyné
- Iván Darvas as Karaganov fõhadnagy
- Elemér Tarsoly as Turumbek tizedes
- Lajos Rajczy Markó
- Erzsi Lengyel as Fiatal özvegyasszony
- Éva Ruttkai as Fiatal rikkancs
- László Bánhidi as Sinkovits
- John Bartha as one of the gendarmes
- Béla Károlyi as one of the soviet soldiers
- Nusi Somogyi
- Mária Lázár
- István Somló
- Sándor Pethes
- Oszkár Ascher
- Kálmán Rózsahegyi

== Bibliography ==
- Cunningham, John. Hungarian Cinema: From Coffee House to Multiplex. Wallflower Press, 2004.
- Homoródy, József. Magyar film, 1948-1963. Filmtudományi Intézet, 1964.
- Liehm, Mira & Liehm, Antonín J. The Most Important Art: Soviet and Eastern European Film After 1945. University of California Press, 1980.
