= Tale on the Twelve Points =

1957 film

- Directed by: Károly Makk
- Written by: Péter Bacsó; István Békeffy; Imre Jeney; Péter Szász
- Produced by: László Szirtes
- Starring: Klári Tolnay; Ferenc Zenthe; István Somló
- Cinematography: István Eiben
- Edited by: Sándor Boronkay
- Music by: Szabolcs Fényes
- Production company: Hunnia Filmgyár
- Release date: 7 February 1957
- Running time: 90 minutes
- Country: Hungary
- Language: Hungarian

Tale on the Twelve Points (Hungarian: Mese a 12 találatról) is a 1957 Hungarian sports comedy film directed by Károly Makk and starring Klári Tolnay, Ferenc Zenthe and István Somló. It was shot at the Hunnia Studios in Budapest. The film's sets were designed by the art director Mátyás Varga. It was one of the most popular films of the decade, with over three million admissions at the box office.

== Cast ==
- Klári Tolnay as Mrs. Barth, pharmacist
- Ferenc Zenthe as Titi, coach
- István Somló as Ferenc Bartha doctor
- Irén Psota as Vali, Sister of Piri
- Iván Darvas as Géza Fazekas, history teacher
- Éva Ruttkai as Kató, gym teacher
- Sándor Peti as uncle Károly, waiter
- Samu Balázs as store manager
- Ervin Kibédi as nervous man at the pharmacy
- Sándor Siménfalvy as man with a toothache at the pharmacy
- László Hlatky as Brobicsek
- Zoltán Greguss as Péntek Lajos, manager og KIK
- Dezsö Garas as Goal-keeper of Lokomotív

== Bibliography ==
- Hames, Peter (ed.) The Cinema of Central Europe. Wallflower Press, 2004.
- Liehm, Mira & Liehm, Antonín J. The Most Important Art: Soviet and Eastern European Film After 1945. University of California Press, 1980.
- Ostrowska, Dorota, Pitassio, Francesco & Varga, Zsuzsanna. Popular Cinemas in East Central Europe: Film Cultures and Histories. Bloomsbury Publishing, 2017.
- Rîpeanu, Bujor. (ed.) International Directory of Cinematographers, Set- and Costume Designers in Film: Hungary (from the beginnings to 1988). Saur, 1981.
