= Liliomfi =

1954 film

- Directed by: Károly Makk
- Written by: Ede Szigligeti; Dezső Mészöly
- Starring: Iván Darvas
- Cinematography: István Pásztor
- Edited by: Sándor Boronkay
- Production company: Mafilm
- Release date: 1954
- Running time: 109 minutes
- Country: Hungary
- Language: Hungarian

Liliomfi is a 1954 Hungarian romantic comedy film directed by Károly Makk. It was entered into the 1955 Cannes Film Festival.

== Cast ==
- Iván Darvas - Liliomfi
- Marianne Krencsey - Mariska
- Margit Dajka - Camilla
- Samu Balázs - professor Szilvay
- Éva Ruttkai - Erzsi
- Imre Soós - Gyuri
- Sándor Pécsi - Szellemfi
- Sándor Tompa - Kányai
- Vera Szemere - Mrs. Zengőbérczi
- Dezső Garas - Schnaps Jr.
- Gábor Rajnay - Count Pejachevich
