= István Somló =

Hungarian actor

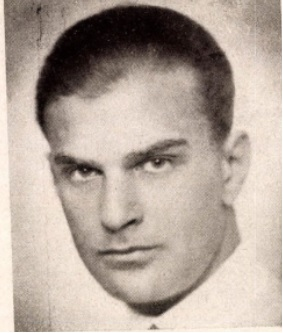
- Somló in 1931.
- Born: 8 May 1902; Szolnok, Austria-Hungary
- Died: 5 April 1971 (aged 68); Budapest, Hungary
- Occupation: Actor
- Years active: 1935–1960 (film)

István Somló (1902–1971) was a Hungarian stage and film actor. In 1947 he was appointed as a co-manager of the Comedy Theatre of Budapest along with Klári Tolnay. Of Jewish heritage, he was unable to work during the Second World War due to the Anti-Jewish laws.

== Selected filmography ==
- Villa for Sale (1935)
- Lady Seeks a Room (1937)
- Honesty and Glory (1951)
- Underground Colony (1951)
- West Zone (1952)
- Under the City (1953)
- A Strange Mask of Identity (1955)
- Springtime in Budapest (1955)
- The Bridge of Life (1956)
- Fever (1957)
- Tale on the Twelve Points (1957)
- By Order of the Emperor (1957)
- Pillar of Salt (1958)

== Bibliography ==
- Fekete, Márton. Prominent Hungarians: Home and Abroad. Szepsi Csombor Literary Circle, 1979.
- Székely, György & Gajdó, Tamás. Magyar színháztörténet: 1920-1949. Akadémiai Kiadó, 1990.
