= Zsuzsa Gordon =

Hungarian actress (1929–2015)

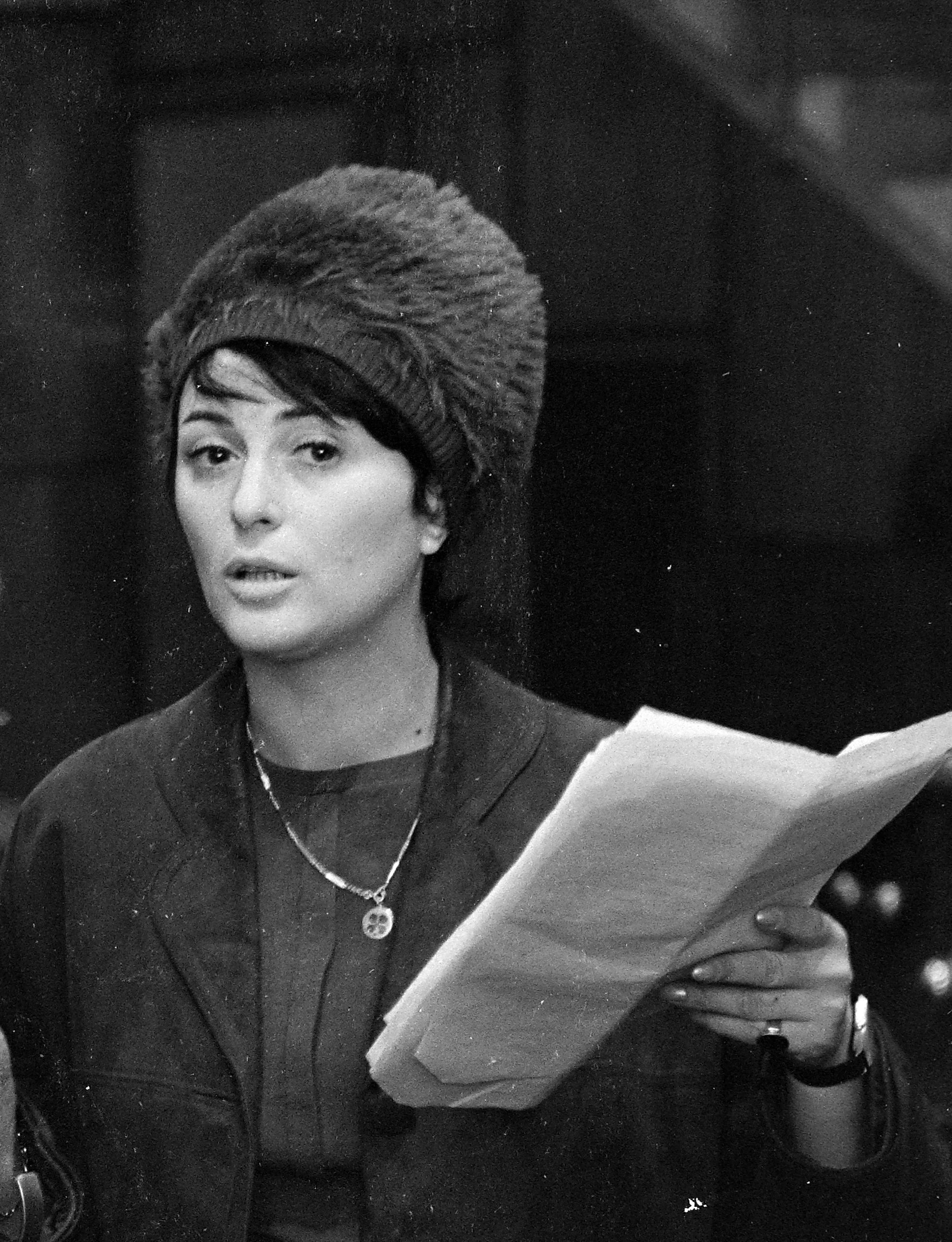
- Gordon in 1963
- Born: 6 July 1929; Budapest, Kingdom of Hungary
- Died: 31 January 2015 (aged 85); Budapest, Hungary
- Occupation: Actress
- Years active: 1949–2005 (film)

Zsuzsa Gordon (6 July 1929 – 31 January 2015) was a Hungarian stage, film and television actress.

== Selected filmography ==
- Mickey Magnate (1949)
- The State Department Store (1953)
- Springtime in Budapest (1955)
- Fever (1957)
- What a Night! (1958)
- Égrenyíló ablak (1960)
- Miért rosszak a magyar filmek? (1964)
- Lady-Killer in Trouble (1964)
- Jacob the Liar (1975)

== Bibliography ==
- Cunningham, John. Hungarian Cinema: From Coffee House to Multiplex. Wallflower Press, 2004.
- Fekete, Márton. Prominent Hungarians: Home and Abroad. Szepsi Csombor Literary Circle, 1979.
