= A Glass of Beer =

- Directed by: Félix Máriássy
- Written by: Judit Máriássy
- Starring: Éva Ruttkai; Tibor Bitskey; Elma Bulla; Mária Sulyok
- Cinematography: István Eiben
- Edited by: Sándor Boronkay
- Music by: Imre Vincze
- Production company: Magyar Filmgyártó Állami Vállalat
- Release date: 25 December 1955
- Running time: 87 minutes
- Country: Hungary
- Language: Hungarian

A Glass of Beer (Hungarian: Egy pikoló világos) is a 1955 Hungarian comedy film directed by Félix Máriássy and starring Éva Ruttkai, Tibor Bitskey and Elma Bulla. It is also known as A Half Pint of Beer.

== Main cast ==
- Éva Ruttkai - Cséri Juli
- Tibor Bitskey - Kincse Marci
- Elma Bulla - Mrs. Cséri
- Mária Sulyok - Mrs. Kincse
- János Görbe - Kincse
- Kálmán Koletár - Kincse Öcsi
- Éva Schubert - Gizus
- Elemér Tarsoly - Juhász
- Katalin Berek - Emmi
- Imre Pongrácz - Laci
- Sándor Peti - Uncle Jocó
- József Kautzky - Bordás
- József Horváth - Lala
- József Petrik - Tatár
- Gyula Horváth - Dagadt
- Lajos Öze - Seregély
- Béla Károlyi - the man in the plaid shirt with the sidecar motorcycle

== Bibliography ==
- Brown, Karl William. Regulating Bodies: Everyday Crime and Popular Resistance in Communist. ProQuest, 2007.
- Burns, Bryan. World Cinema: Hungary. Fairleigh Dickinson University Press, 1996.
