= Iván Darvas =

Hungarian actor (1925–2007)

- Iván Darvas in the movie The Corporal and Others (1965)
- Born: Szilárd Darvas; 14 June 1925; Behynce, Czechoslovakia (now part of Tornaľa, Slovakia)
- Died: 3 June 2007 (aged 81); Budapest, Hungary
- Occupation: Actor
- Years active: 1946–2007
- Spouse(s): Klári Tolnay; Erzsébet Házy; Irén Morocza (1972–2007)
- Children: Ráchel Tatjána (1975); Benjámin Olivér (1976)

Iván Darvas (born Szilárd Darvas; 14 June 1925 in Behynce (Hungarian: Beje, German: Behintz; now part of Tornaľa, Revúca District, Banská Bystrica Region) – 3 June 2007 in Budapest, Hungary) was a Hungarian actor.

== Early life ==
Born as Szilárd Darvas, his father was János Darvas, and his mother, Antonina Evdokimova, was Russian. He spent his childhood in Prague, where his father worked as a journalist. He went to a German-language school, so he spoke Hungarian, Russian and German well. At home they spoke Hungarian, which he thought, was a secret language they understood only. He came to Hungary in 1939. In 1945 he worked as a military interpreter for the Soviet military. In 1946 Darvas was employed in Actors' Theatre (Művész Szinház) by Zoltán Várkonyi, and he worked there until 1949.

== Career ==
Darvas changed his given name, Szilárd to Iván in the Actors' Theatre, to differentiate himself from Szilárd Darvas, a well known poet and comedian of the era. He played in the Madách Theatre between 1949 and 1956. In the revolution of 1956 he organized a revolutionary committee to free his brother from prison. For this, when the revolution was crushed he was sentenced to 22 months in prison. From 1959 to 1963 he had to work as an unskilled laborer. In 1963 Darvas was allowed to play on stage again. From 1963 he spent some time in the National Theatre of Miskolc and the Attila József Theatre. In 1965 he offered a contract in Vígszinház by Zoltán Várkonyi and he stayed there until 1989. In 1990 Darvas became a freelance actor. In 1972 he married Irén Morocza; they had two children. He was also a member of parliament from 1990 to 1994, in the Free Liberals' Alliance.

He carefully recreated stage characters' inner worlds and struggles. He used subtle irony and intellectual wit. He acted in numerous significant Hungarian films. One of his best appearances was in the movie Liliomfi in 1954.

The international audience could see him in these movies: Drama of the Lark (1963), Love (1971), Mary, Mother of Jesus (1999), Jakob the Liar (1999), Beresina, or the Last Days of Switzerland (1999).

== Awards ==
- Kossuth Prize (1978),
- Jászai Mari-prize (1955, 1967),
- Significant artist award (1969),
- Excellent artist award (1975).
- Erzsébet Prize (1989)

== Main roles ==
- Raskolnikov (Dostoyevsky–Ackland: Crime and Punishment)
- Tuzenbach, Versinyin (Chekhov: Three Sisters)
- Baron (Gorky: The Lower Depths)
- Popriscsin (Gogol–Lunean–Coggio–Czimer J.: Madman's diary)
- Larry Slade (O'Neill: Eljő a jeges)
- Don Quixote (Wasserman–Leigh: Man of La Mancha)
- Firs (Chekhov: The Cherry Orchard)
- Martin Dysart (Shaffer: Equus)
- Doublebass player (Süsskind: The Double Bass)
- Ir. Gerskovics A.: D. I. Gogol Diary of a madman(1979)

== Selected filmography ==
- A Woman Gets a Start (1949)
- Gala Suit (1949)
- Erkel (1952)
- Semmelweis (1952)
- Fourteen Lives (1954)
- Ward 9 (1955)
- Accident (1955)
- Springtime in Budapest (1955)
- Dollar Daddy (1956)
- Sunday Romance (1957)
- Adventure in Gerolstein (1957)
- Tale on the Twelve Points (1957)
- Cold Days (1966)
- Three Nights of Love (1967)
- The Pendragon Legend (1974)
