= At Midnight (1957 film) =

1957 film

- Directed by: György Révész
- Written by: Iván Boldizsár (novel); László Bánk; György Révész; Péter Szász
- Produced by: László Szirtes
- Starring: Éva Ruttkai; Miklós Gábor; Zsuzsa Bánki
- Cinematography: Barnabás Hegyi
- Edited by: Mária Szécsényi
- Music by: András Bágya
- Production company: Hunnia Filmgyár
- Release date: 25 December 1957
- Running time: 90 minutes
- Country: Hungary
- Language: Hungarian

At Midnight (Hungarian: Éjfélkor) is a 1957 Hungarian drama film directed by György Révész and starring Éva Ruttkai, Miklós Gábor and Zsuzsa Bánki. It was shot at the Hunnia Studios in Budapest. The film's sets were designed by the art director Melinda Vasáry. It was screened at the 1958 Venice Film Festival.

== Selected cast ==
- Éva Ruttkai as Dékány Viktória
- Miklós Gábor as Károlyi János
- Zsuzsa Bánki as Ági
- István Rozsos as Emil
- Ferenc Baracsi as Róbert
- Mária Sívó as Viki mamája
- Blanka Péchy as Ella néni
- Gábor Rajnay as Jakab bácsi
- János Õsi as Szirtes Miklós
- Margit Árpád as Zongorázó hölgy

== Bibliography ==
- Liehm, Mira & Liehm, Antonín J. The Most Important Art: Soviet and Eastern European Film After 1945. University of California Press, 1980.
- Portuges, Catherine. Screen Memories: The Hungarian Cinema of Márta Mészáros. Indiana University Press, 1993.
