= Three Nights of Love (1967 film) =

1967 film

- Directed by: György Révész
- Written by: Miklós Hubay
- Starring: Vera Venczel; Benedek Tóth; Iván Darvas
- Cinematography: Tamás Somló
- Edited by: Zoltán Kerényi; Zoltánné Kerényi
- Music by: György Ránki
- Production company: Játékfilmstúdió
- Release date: 21 September 1967
- Running time: 106 minutes
- Country: Hungary
- Language: Hungarian

Three Nights of Love (Hungarian: Egy szerelem három éjszakája) is a 1967 Hungarian war drama film directed by György Révész and starring Vera Venczel, Benedek Tóth and Iván Darvas. It was shot at the Hunnia Studios in Budapest. The film's sets were designed by the art director József Romvári.

== Cast ==
- Vera Venczel as Júlia
- Benedek Tóth as Róbert
- Iván Darvas as Boldizsár
- Zoltán Latinovits as Menyhért
- Imre Sinkovits as Gáspár
- Philippe Forquet as Gilbert
- Zoltán Makláry as Old painter
- Ferenc Kállai as Detective
- Tamás Major as Lajos, Head waiter
- Ilona Béres as Melitta
- Gyula Bodrogi as Sándorka
- Zoltán Greguss as Husband of Melitta

== Bibliography ==
- Cunningham, John. Hungarian Cinema: From Coffee House to Multiplex. Wallflower Press, 2004.
- Liehm, Mira & Liehm, Antonín J. The Most Important Art: Soviet and Eastern European Film After 1945. University of California Press, 1980.
- Rîpeanu, Bujor. (ed.) International Directory of Cinematographers, Set- and Costume Designers in Film: Hungary (from the beginnings to 1988). Saur, 1981.
