= Somewhere in Europe (film) =

1948 film

- Directed by: Géza von Radványi
- Written by: Béla Balázs; Géza Radványi; Félix Máriássy; Judit Fehér; Judit Máriássy
- Produced by: László Szirtes
- Starring: Artúr Somlay; Miklós Gábor
- Music by: Dénes Buday
- Release date: 1948
- Running time: 105 minutes
- Country: Hungary
- Language: Hungarian

Somewhere in Europe (Hungarian: Valahol Európában) is a 1948 Hungarian drama film directed by Géza von Radványi. It depicts the aftermath of World War II and specifically the lives of a gang of orphaned children in a postwar setting. The gang of children steal, cheat, and pillage due largely to the harsh circumstances and the world around them. The film has been compared to Italian neorealism. It was shot at the Hunnia Studios in Budapest. The film's sets were designed by the art director József Pán. The film was chosen to be part of the New Budapest Twelve, a list of Hungarian films considered the best in 2000. It was adapted into a musical.

== Cast ==
- Artúr Somlay as Péter Simon
- Miklós Gábor as Hosszú ("Tall")
- Zsuzsa Bánki as Éva
- György Bárdy as Police Commissioner
