= The Pendragon Legend (film) =

1974 film

- Directed by: György Révész
- Written by: Antal Szerb (novel); György Révész
- Starring: Zoltán Latinovits; Iván Darvas; Teri Tordai; Marianna Moór
- Cinematography: György Illés
- Edited by: Mrs. Zoltán Kerényi
- Music by: György Ránki
- Production company: MAFILM Budapest Filmstúdiói
- Release date: 12 September 1974
- Running time: 98 minutes
- Country: Hungary
- Language: Hungarian

The Pendragon Legend (Hungarian: A Pendragon legenda) is a 1974 Hungarian thriller film directed by György Révész and starring Zoltán Latinovits, Iván Darvas and Teri Tordai. It is based on the 1934 novel The Pendragon Legend by Antal Szerb. It was shot at the Hunnia Studios in Budapest.

== Cast ==
- Zoltán Latinovits as Dr. János Bátky
- Iván Darvas as Earl of Gwynedd
- Teri Tordai as Eileen St. Claire
- Marianna Moór as Lene Kretzsch
- Béla Timár as Osborne Pendragon
- Judit Halász as Cynthia Pendragon
- Ferenc Kállai as Dr. Rehmer / Reverend
- István Bujtor as George Maloney
- Tamás Major as James Morvin
- Nóra Tábori as Mrs. Burt / Psychic
- Ila Schütz as Jenny
- Cecília Esztergályos as Pat O'Brian
- László Kozák as John Griffith
- Erzsi Simor as Lady Malmsbury Croft
- Márta Bakó as Crasy old woman
