= Gala Suit =

1949 film

- Directed by: Viktor Gertler
- Written by: Miklós Gyárfás; László Hárs; Tibor Nyíri; Lajos Pásztor
- Produced by: József Golda
- Starring: Gyula Benkö; Zsuzsa Bánki; Iván Darvas
- Cinematography: Barnabás Hegyi
- Edited by: Félix Máriássy
- Music by: Tibor Polgár
- Production company: Magyar Filmgyártó Nemzeti Vállalat
- Release date: 14 April 1949
- Running time: 91 minutes
- Country: Hungary
- Language: Hungarian

Gala Suit (Hungarian: Díszmagyar) is a 1949 Hungarian comedy film directed by Viktor Gertler and starring Gyula Benkö, Zsuzsa Bánki and Iván Darvas. It was shot at the Hunnia Studios in Budapest. The film's sets were designed by the art director József Pán.

== Synopsis ==
Budapest university student Lajos discovers that his friends have pawned his only suit, which contains his friend Kitty's bracelet in the pocket. To go and fetch it back he puts on an old costume belonging to his landlady's brother. Out on the streets in this strange attire, he enjoys a series of adventures on the day of a visit by the King of Italy to the Hungarian capital.

== Cast ==
- Gyula Benkö as Rédey Lajos
- Zsuzsa Bánki as Gohrmann Kitty
- Iván Darvas as Dodo
- Mária Kovács as Kállai Ilonka
- György Solthy as Gohrmann tábornok
- Mária Lázár as Gohrmanné
- György Dénes as Würstler
- László Földényi as Kovács
- József Mátray as báró Kékesy
- Sándor Peti as III. Viktor Emmanuel
- László Keleti as Salgó Izsó
- John Bartha as one of the counts at the ball
- Gyula Farkas (actor) as one of the counts at the ball

== Bibliography ==
- Balski, Grzegorz . Directory of Eastern European Film-makers and Films 1945-1991. Flicks Books, 1992.
- Nemeskürty, István. A Short History of the Hungarian Cinema. Corvina, 1980.
