= Éva Ruttkai =

Hungarian actress (1927–1986)

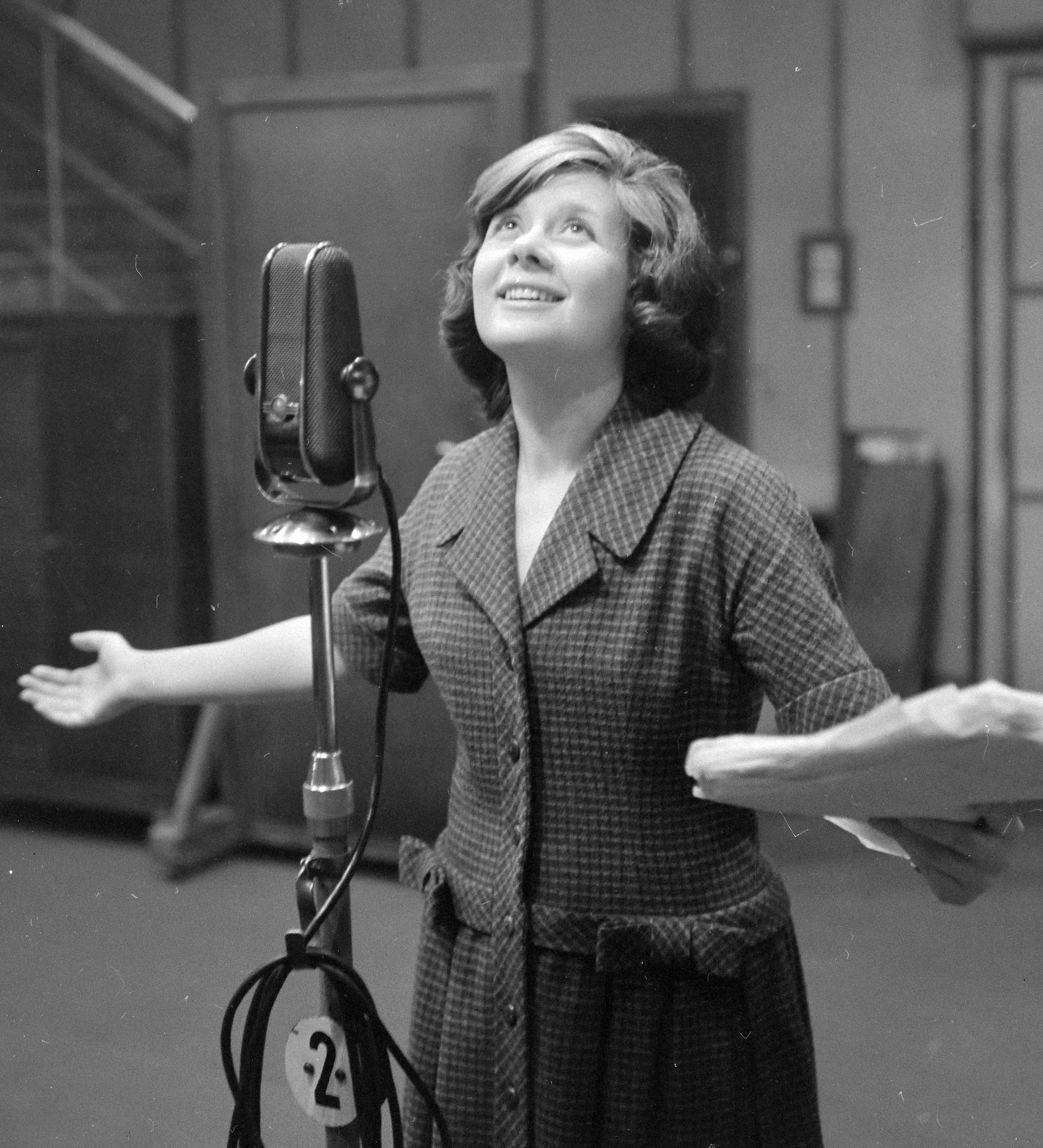
- Ruttkai in 1969
- Born: 31 December 1927; Budapest, Hungary
- Died: 27 September 1986 (aged 58); Budapest, Hungary
- Occupation: Actress
- Years active: 1945–1986

Éva Ruttkai (31 December 1927 – 27 September 1986) was a Hungarian actress, well known from her work on stage, cinema, and television productions. She was the wife of Miklós Gábor, and later Zoltán Latinovits.

== Life ==
Éva Ruttkai (born Éva Russ) was born on 31 December 1927, in Budapest, as the sixth child (though only she, and her brothers Iván and Ottó reached adulthood). The family had hard time to make a living. The two brothers already worked as child actors, with Ruttkai following them from age 2. With her brother Iván she worked in the Vígszínház theatre, then in the children theatre of Artúr Lakner, where Ruttkai could work together with well-known actors like Lili Darvas or Artúr Somlay. Gaining the attention of Dániel Jób, director of the Vígszínház, she was contracted at age 16, playing there until her death (except for 1948–1951, playing in the National Theatre). She married Miklós Gábor in 1950, giving birth to a daughter, Júlia, two years later. Meeting Zoltán Latinovits in 1960 during rehearsals, they lived together until Latinovits's death.

== Death ==
In 1984, Ruttkai was diagnosed with breast cancer. Half a year after her last stage appearance, she died on 27 September 1986.

== Legacy ==
During her four decade of career, Éva Ruttkai became one of the most versatile actress of her time, gaining critical acclaim in both classical and modern, native and foreign stage roles, and a wide range of movies and television films. She won the Kossuth Prize in 1960.

== Selected filmography ==
=== Film ===
- 1934: Purple Lilacs
- 1948: The Siege of Beszterce - Ancsura
- 1949: Szabóné
- 1950: Mattie the Goose-boy - Gyöngyi - Döbrögi lánya
- 1950: The Marriage of Katalin Kis - Vilcsi
- 1951: A Strange Marriage - Katica
- 1951: A selejt bosszúja (Short) - Manci
- 1951: Költözik a hivatal (Short) - Bözsi
- 1954: Me and My Grandfather - Margit néni
- 1954: Liliomfi - Erzsi
- 1955: Springtime in Budapest
- 1955: A Strange Mask of Identity - Eszti
- 1955: A Glass of Beer - Cséri Juli
- 1956: Ünnepi vacsora - Klári
- 1956: Nem igaz (Short) - Királylány
- 1957: Tale on the Twelve Points - Kató,tornatanárnõ
- 1957: By Order of the Emperor - Lotte
- 1957: At Midnight - Dékány Viktória
- 1958: Pillar of Salt - Elzi
- 1958: What a Night! - Vera
- 1958: Egyiptomi útijegyzetek - Narrátor
- 1959: Sleepless Years - Vilma
- 1959: Kard és kocka - Jozefa
- 1960: Három csillag - Mari
- 1960: Alázatosan jelentem - Anna
- 1960: Az arcnélküli város - Vali, Galetta felesége
- 1961: Amíg holnap lesz - Szabó Viola
- 1962: Az utolsó vacsora - Jesszi
- 1962: Pirosbetűs hétköznapok - Klement Klára
- 1963: Asszony a telepen - Éva, özvegy Szekeresné
- 1963: Foto Háber - Barabás Anna
- 1966: Story of My Foolishness - Kabók Kati
- 1966: Minden kezdet nehéz
- 1966: Kárpáthy Zoltán - Flóra, Szentirmay felesége
- 1966: Egy magyar nábob - Szentirmayné, Flóra
- 1967: A múmia közbeszól - Françoise Chantal / Hidegarcú Hölgy
- 1967: Kártyavár - Zizi
- 1967: Keresztelő - Dóra
- 1968: A hamis Izabella - Dr.Végh Márta
- 1968: Tanulmány a nőkről - Éva, Balogh felesége
- 1968: Stars of Eger - Izabella Királynõ
- 1969: Alfa Rómeó és Júlia - Dr. Szabó Júlia
- 1970: Utazás a koponyám körül - Karinthy felesége
- 1970: N.N. a halál angyala - Judit, Korin felesége (uncredited)
- 1970: Történelmi magánügyek - Terényi Mária
- 1970: Csak egy telefon - Ágostonné,Éva
- 1970: Szerelmi álmok – Liszt - Carolyne (voice, uncredited)
- 1971: Szindbád - Lenke
- 1972: Volt egyszer egy család - Liza
- 1975: Ha megjön József - Ágnes, József anyja
- 1976: Labirintus - Mara, színésznõ / Anna
- 1986: Idő van - Halasi's mother
- 1986: Keserű igazság - Klári
- 1988: Küldetés Evianba - Selma Selig (final film role)

=== Television films ===
- 1958: Papucs - Júlia
- 1961: A szerző ma meghal - Diana
- 1962: Két üres pohár - Éva
- 1962: A vak
- 1963: Kreutzer szonáta - Feleség
- 1964: Lajos király válik - Királyné
- 1966: Látszat és valóság
- 1966: Távolsági történet
- 1969: Bözsi és a többiek 1–3 (TV Mini-Series) - Bözsi
- 1968: Az aranykesztyű lovagjai (TV Mini-Series) - Mrs. Harrison
- 1968: A férfi - Judit
- 1969: A régi nyár - Mária Koháry, actress
- 1969: Olykor a hegedűk is
- 1969: Én, Prenn Ferenc
- 1969: Komédia a tetőn
- 1970: Lujzi
- 1970: Tévedni isteni dolog
- 1972: A képzelt beteg - Toinette
- 1978: Abigél (TV Mini-Series) - Horn Mici
- 1985: Egy fiú bőrönddel - Dobosyné, Péter anyja
- 1985: Fantasztikus nagynéni - Amália néni

== Sources ==
- Gábor, Szigethy. Ruttkai. Budapest: Budapest Terra, 1987. ISBN 963-205-207-2
- Gábor, Szigethy. Parancsolj, tündérkirálynőm!. Budapest: Zeneműkiadó, 1989. ISBN 963-330-684-1
- Attila, Deák. Ruttkai Éva: Kortársaink a filmművészetben. Budapest: Múzsák Közművelődési Kiadó, 1986. ISBN 978-963-564-277-9
- Éva Ruttkai in the Hungarian Theatrical Lexicon (György, Székely. Magyar Színházművészeti Lexikon. Budapest: Akadémiai Kiadó, 1994. ISBN 978-963-05-6635-3), freely available on mek.oszk.hu
