= Zsuzsa Bánki =

Hungarian actress (1921–1998)

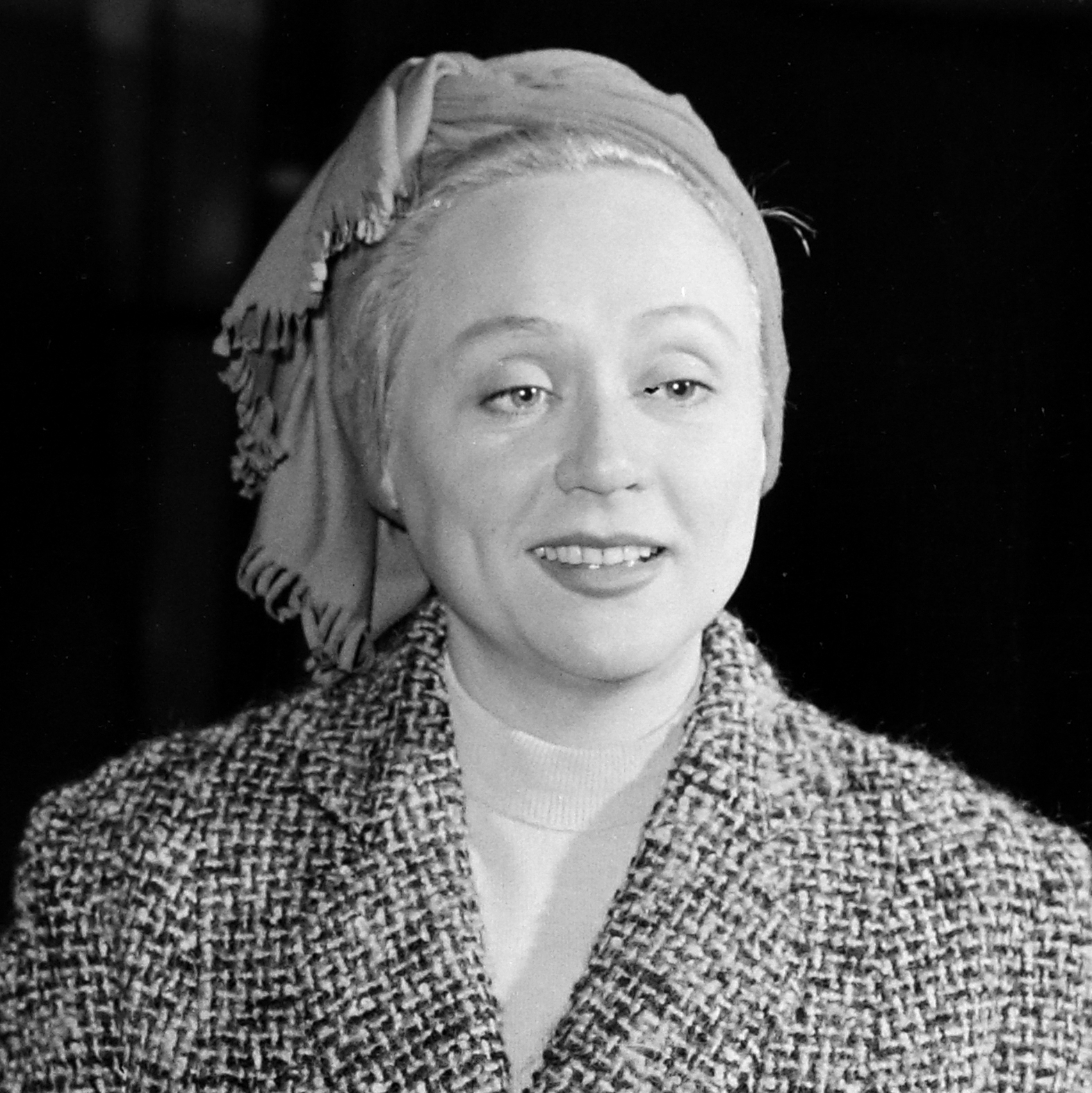
- Bánki in 1958.
- Born: 31 July 1921; Budapest, Hungary
- Died: 5 January 1998 (aged 76); Budapest, Hungary
- Occupation: Actress
- Years active: 1945–1997 (film & TV)

Zsuzsa Bánki (1921–1998) was a Hungarian film, stage and television actress. Making her screen debut in 1945, she appeared in films throughout the 1950s and 1960s. Her final appearance was a recurring role on the televisions series Szomszédok.

== Selected filmography ==
- The Schoolmistress (1945)
- Somewhere in Europe (1948)
- Gala Suit (1949)
- A Woman Gets a Start (1949)
- At Midnight (1957)
- City of Fear (1965)
- Walls (1968)
- Szomszédok (1987–1997, TV series)

== Bibliography ==
- Fekete, Márton. Prominent Hungarians: Home and Abroad. Szepsi Csombor Literary Circle, 1979.
- Petrie, Graham. History Must Answer to Man: The Contemporary Hungarian Cinema. Corvina Kiadó, 1981.
