= Mafilm =

Hungarian film production company

- Native name: Mafilm
- Type: Public company
- Industry: Filmmaking
- Founded: 19 August 1948
- Founder: nationalization
- Headquarters: Budapest, Hungary
- Products: Films
- Parent: Nemzeti Filmintézet
- Website: nfi.hu/en/nfi-studios

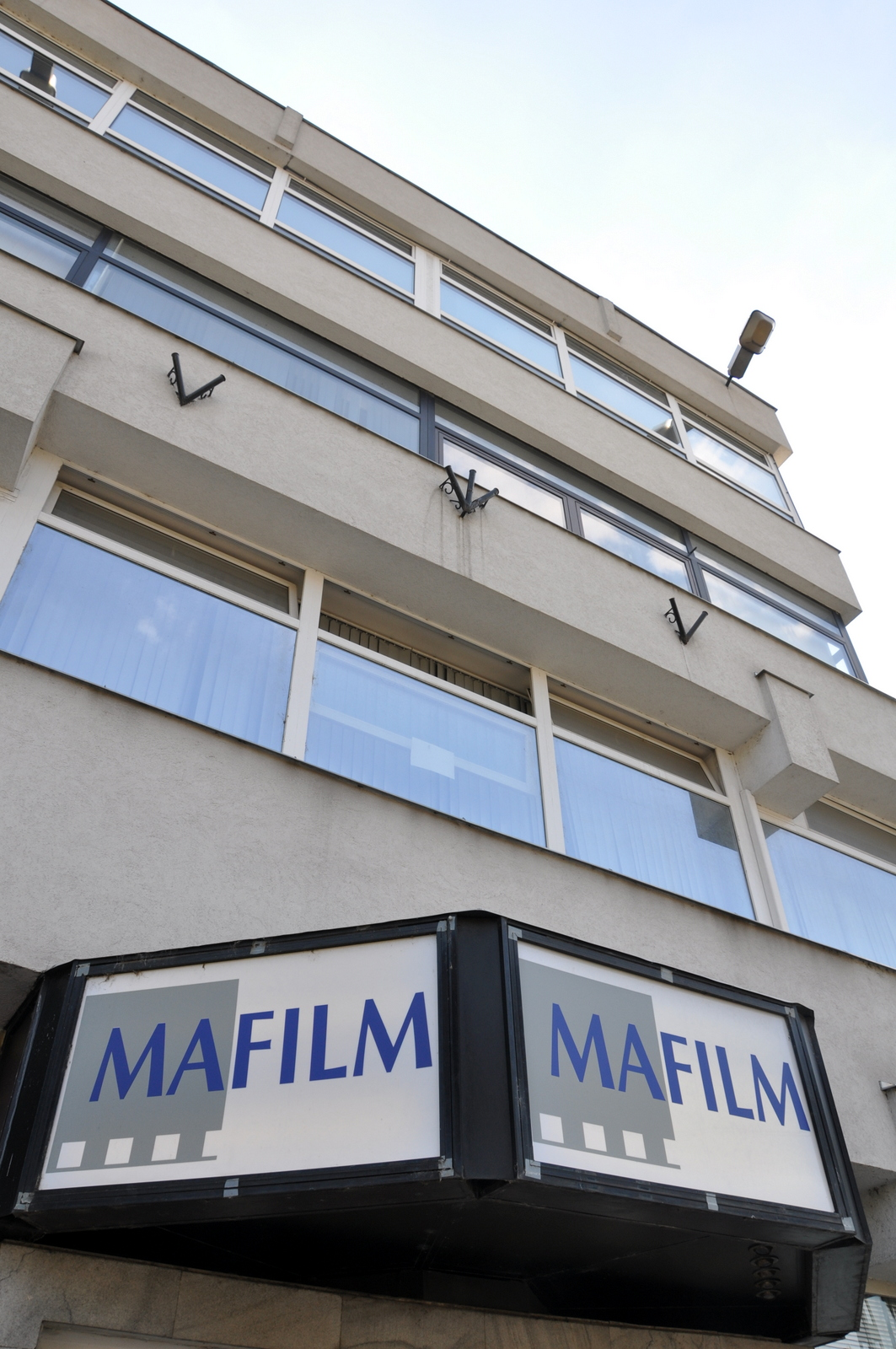
Headquarters

Mafilm was established in 1948. It has been the largest and most significant film studio in Hungary and a strategic base for the Hungarian film industry. Mafilm's history has had its ups and downs. It dates back to Kolozsvár, and its ancestors include Europe's third-largest silent film factory. Korda Sándor (his original Hungarian name, later Alexander Korda) founded the predecessor of Mafilm.

== History ==
=== Mafilm - From Nationalization to Reorganization ===
The decree of the Council of Ministers of 19 August 1948 decided on the nationalization of the Hunnia Film Factory under the name of Magyar Filmgyártó Nemzeti Vállalat (Mafilm). The first film released after nationalization, Frigyes Bán's Talpalatnyi föld, was an international success.

From 1949, film production was assigned to the Communist minister József Révai. After Stalin's death, from 1953, film production belonged to Minister József Darvas, and this has brought a revival of Hungarian cinema. Contributing to the success was the fact that Darvas gave more money in addition to more freedom. The positive changes quickly bore fruit, bringing a new golden age to Hungarian film. For the first time, films from behind the "Iron Curtain" came into the focus of international film art. Zoltán Fábri (Körhinta, Hannibál tanár úr), Zoltán Várkonyi, Viktor Gertler, Félix Máriássy, Károly Makk (Liliomfi), were members of the new generation of Hungarian film directors who restored the status of Hungarian film.

The overthrow of the 1956 revolution and the subsequent mass showdown pushed back the promising processes that had begun in the Hungarian film industry. The structure of film production was restructured, and Mafilm continued to operate as Hunnia Filmstúdió. The films made here were mostly apolitical works, mainly literary adaptations. Among them stood out were László Ranódy's three films (Szakadék, Légy jó mindhalálig, Pacsirta) as well as Zoltán Fábri's work, Édes Anna.

At the same time, the Budapest Filmstúdió was established, and its director, István Nemeskürty, played a crucial role in becoming an internationally renowned creative workshop. He gathered young filmmakers, and they became formed a new generation of Hungarian film directors. At the film studio, Zoltán Várkonyi, Félix Máriássy, Miklós Szinetár, Miklós Jancsó and István Gaál signed film contracts as directors.

=== Mafilm - again ===
As of January 1, 1964, the film factory formed by the merger of Hunnia Filmstúdió and Budapest Filmstúdió was renamed Mafilm.

The year 1966 also brought about a change in the financing of feature film production. The Ministry of Culture transferred a significant part of the costs of the films to Mokép and Hungarofilm. Two years later, in 1968, the coordination of production and distribution brought the Magyar Filmtröszt to life.

During the following decade, there was such a huge upswing in film production, that Mafilm's studios were not able to serve all the demands. Therefore, the film factory's new 23-hectare studio base was established in the ideal location of Fót.

Hungarian films had their golden age in the sixties and seventies. Two generations appeared on the silver screens at the same time: Zoltán Fábri, Miklós Jancsó, András Kovács, Péter Bacsó, Károly Makk, and the youth: István Szabó, Zoltán Huszárik, Pál Gábor, István Gaál, Ferenc Kósa, Sándor Sára and their companions. There were Hungarian filmmakers of the era whose work was considered among the greatest achievements in universal cinema, including at international level. One such filmmaker was Miklós Jancsó, of whom many film critics have stated that it is no exaggeration to say that he is also among the first in the world, on an equal footing with Antonioni, or even Bergman.

=== Film Factories and Film Studios within Mafilm ===
In 1972, feature film production was reorganized again. The Hunnia Játékfilmstúdió Vállalat, the Budapest Játékfilmstúdió Vállalat and the Magyar Filmgyártó és Szolgáltató Vállalat were founded. Subsequently, in 1976, the structure formed within Mafilm's organization four years earlier was changed again, three companies were merged again, and then four feature film studios, Budapest, Dialóg, Hunnia and Objektív, were established.

==== Budapest Film Studio ====
István Nemeskürty also managed the re-established Budapest Film Studio. Gábor Hanák became the head of the studio in 1985. A new generation of young directors started working at the Budapest Film Studio in the 90's, among others Ildikó Enyedi (Golden Camera Award, Cannes), Attila Janisch, Zoltán Kamondi and Dezső Zsigmond, now all well-known and respected directors. In 1992, the film director Ferenc Kardos took over the film studio, and in 1999 the baton fell into the hands of László Kántor, the cinematographer-director who represented the youngest generation of Hungarian film at that time.

==== Hunnia Film Studio ====
The Hunnia was organized under the direction of Miklós Köllő, Pál Sándor took part in the professional work as a deputy leader, and the art council was Ferenc Grunwalsky, Ferenc Kardos, Zsolt Kézdi-Kovács, the later first man of Mafilm, Pál Zolnay and Zsuzsa Bíró, Sándor Csoóri. The film studio was later directed by film director Sándor Simó.

==== Dialóg Film Studio ====
The Dialóg was organized under the leadership of Antal Bogács. Bogács's deputy was Péter Bacsó, the members of the studio's art council were István Dárday, Zoltán Fábri, Imre Gyöngyössy, Miklós Jancsó, András Kovács and Károly Makk, supplemented by playwright János Újhelyi and literary historian Miklós Béládi. From 1982, Péter Bacsó was the director of the film studio, followed by Tamás Tolmár and then Ferenc András.

==== Objektív Film Studio ====
The film studio was established from the Béla Balázs Studio, unlike other Hungarian film production workshops, not on the initiative of the state, but from the independent workshop of young filmmakers, by the joint determination of "aged" film directors.

Almost forty directors shared among them the film studio's nearly one hundred feature films, and thanks to István Szabó, they managed to win an Academy Awards with Mephisto.

At the beginning, the film team was led by József Marx, his deputy was István Szabó.

=== On the Edge of Bankruptcy ===
==== On the Verge of Disintegration ====
In 1987, Mafilm was decentralized. The four studios – Budapest, Dialóg, Hunnia, Objektív – have emerged from Mafilm, gaining complete autonomy.

The Budapest Film Studio, which also served as Mafilm Site II, continued to operate under the name Magyar Mozi és Videofilmgyár (MOVI). In 1998, the walls of the nearly 70-year-old historical creative workshop of the Hungarian film industry were demolished. Today, the international bus station stands in MOVI's place, opposite its main entrance stands on a small memorial stone: "Itt egykor FILMGYÁR állt, a magyar kultúra egyik őrhelye. 1927–1995" ('Here was once a FILM FACTORY, one of the watchtowers of Hungarian culture. 1927-1995.')

In 1989, Mafilm executives opted for a more dynamic, smaller organizational structure. It was then that Mafilm was formed with its majority stake the first film companies: Mafilmrent, Mafilm Audio and Mafilm Profilm.

In 1992, the Magyar Mozgókép Közalapítvány, MMKA (Hungarian Film Public Foundation), a group of 33 film organisations, was founded. In the same year, on 15 June, the Fővárosi Bíróság (Metropolitan Court) found Mafilm was insolvent and declared the liquidation of the film company. On 7 December, the Filmunió, a consortium of state-only institutions, bought Mafilm from the liquidator for HUF 415 million. Following the change of ownership, the new owners retained the name Mafilm and created a huge redundancy. On 1 January 1994, Mafilm was formed into a public limited company with a capital of HUF 500 million.

By 1996, the company was back in bankruptcy. The result of the tender for the privatization of Mafilm in early 1998 was no longer announced by the Horn government in view of the upcoming parliamentary elections. By 1999, Mafilm's ownership structure had been reduced to two players, with the ÁPV (State Privatization and Asset Management Co.) and MMKA once again re-building state ownership.

==== MMKA in Power ====
In 2004, the Film Act was established (Law II of 2004 on Motion Picture).

In 2006, the government decided to hand over the state-owned Mafilm to the MMKA. Since 2007, Mafilm's asset management has also been transferred to MMKA, which is chaired by Ferenc Grunwalsky and its CEO, Tamas Tolmár.

In November 2009, Mafilm's Huszárik Studio was handed over to Máriássy Studio in Fót. Mafilm's investment of HUF 500 million created the largest studio of the film factory.

In 2010, the mandate of the Film Board of Trustees, MMKA, headed by Grunwalsky expired, and the new chairman became writer Zoltán Kőrösi. In 2011, following due diligence at the foundation ordered by Kőrösi, the government withdrew 20 percent of the foundation's budget, making it insolvent.

In 2012, a government decision terminated the MMKA operating Mafilm.

== Restart Again ==
Andrew Vajna was appointed Government Commissioner for the Hungarian Film Industry in 2011, and together with Ágnes Havas and Csaba Bereczki, CEO and International Director of the Magyar Nemzeti Filmalap, he put the Hungarian film industry on a completely new footing. In 2012, the Magyar Nemzeti Filmalap consolidated the assets of the defunct Magyar Mozgókép Közalapítvány and settled its debts.

Vajna set three goals in an interview with Film New Europe in Cannes in May 2012, and within a short time he achieved all three. He successfully negotiated with the banks to reschedule the outstanding debts of MMKA, managed to create a clean slate for the film industry; managed to get 80 percent of the profits of the Six Lottery automatically transferred to the film fund; and finally, more than doubled the number of films planned for 2012 from four to ten in one year.

From 2012, Tamás Zákonyi became the CEO of Mafilm, succeeded in 2019 by Andrea Ildikó Ottinger. On 1 October 2013, both Mafilm and the Magyar Filmlaboratórium were merged into the Magyar Nemzeti Filmalap, which was then tasked with providing studios and external sets for domestic and foreign film and television productions, as well as prop, costume and weapons rental services. In addition, it was responsible for the rental of office space and the operation of the Budapest and Fót sites.

In January 2014, the renovated Studios III and IV of Mafilm's film factory in Róna Street, were inaugurated with a HUF 300 million grant by the government. In Zákonyi's words at the handover ceremony, the film production facilities offered by the easily accessible, modern and attractive renovated studios enable them to accommodate up to 5-6 productions at a time.

== Centenary ==
On the centenary of the Film Factory in 2017, the colours of the Hungarian film industry were present at the ceremony commemorating the founding of the film factory a century ago by Korda Sándor and Pásztory M. Miklós in Róna Street. This industry would become an iconic pilgrimage site for Hungarian filmmaking.

The ceremony concluded with a screening of excerpts from Zoltán Fábri's films, followed by the unveiling of a plaque on the façade of the film factory, and the unveiling of the director's name by Studios III and IV.

== Structural Changes ==
Following the death of Andrew Vajna in 2019, Csaba Káel, the Government Commissioner responsible for the film industry, who renewed Hungarian film production, brought its infrastructure into line with world standards and created predictable management, took over as the Government Commissioner responsible for the development of the Hungarian film industry. Káel was also appointed head of Hungarian film production.

The 2019 CVI Act of establishing the Nemzeti Filmintézet (National Film Institute Hungary, NFI) contains the necessary amendments to the law for the restructuring of the entire Hungarian film production structure. The essence of the new legislation is that the National Film Institute Hungary will be responsible for the coordinated activities of the entire Hungarian film industry. The National Film Institute Hungary was formed by the merger of the Magyar Nemzeti Filmalap and the Médiamecenatúra Program. As part of the structural change, the Filmiroda, the office that oversees the Hungarian film industry and foreign contractors filming in the country, was removed from the Médiatanács (NMHH) and placed under the Miniszterelnöki Kabinetiroda. In parallel with the above reorganisations, the name of the film company changed several times, with the official website, in early 2020, Mafilm Nonprofit Zrt. and later MAFILM-PROFIL Reklám Kft. while in English they were referred to as Mafilm Hungarian Film Studios. In 2019, 14 films were made in Mafilm's studios in Fót, plus two in the outdoor pool and ten in the outdoor sets. The prop library served 70 productions, while over a hundred film productions borrowed costumes for filming.

Within the National Film Institute Hungary, a five-member Film Selection Committee was set up to decide on the funding of film proposals submitted to the Filmalap, taking into account professional criteria. It takes into account as a fundamental criterion whether the combination of artistic merit and financial feasibility can be optimally achieved in the case of acceptance of a given film proposal.

In August 2021, Káel announced that the government's economic protection action plan had decided to develop studios, unprecedented in the history of Hungarian film production. As an investment of the National Film Institute Hungary, the construction of four new studios in Fót was started on a useful floor area of 9600 square metres. The development will increase the film production capacity in Fót by approximately five times to 12 200 square metres. Thanks to the expansion of the service portfolio, worth more than HUF 40 billion, the Hungarian film industry will be able to shoot its films in practically two separate studios. The development is also intended to consolidate the strategic competitive advantage that Hungary has the largest film production capacity in Europe after London. Káel has set 2022 as the target date for completion of the expansion.

== Filmography ==
List of self-produced films
Movie title	Year	Film production company	Director	Screenwriter	Director of Photography	Composer
A PÉNZCSINÁLÓ	1964	MAFILM 3. Játékfilmstúdió	Bán Frigyes	Bencsik Imre	Forgács Ottó	Fényes Szabolcs
ÁLMODOZÁSOK KORA	1964	Mafilm 3. Játékfilmstúdió	Szabó István	Szabó István	Vámos Tamás	Eötvös Péter
AZ ÉLETBE TÁNCOLTATOTT LÁNY	1964	Mafilm 4. Játékfilmstúdió	Banovich Tamás	Banovich Tamás	Szécsényi Ferenc	Vujicsics Tihamér
DÉLTŐL HAJNALIG	1964	Mafilm 2. Játékfilmstúdió	Rényi Tamás	Fábián Zoltán	Herczenik Miklós	Láng István
HA EGYSZER HÚSZ ÉV MÚLVA	1964	Mafilm 3. Játékfilmstúdió	Keleti Márton	Bíró Zsuzsa	Pásztor István	Ránki György
IGEN	1964	Mafilm 3. Játékfilmstúdió	Révész György	Boldizsár Iván	Szécsényi Ferenc	Mihály András
ÍGY JÖTTEM	1964	MAFILM 4. Játékfilmstúdió	Jancsó Miklós	Hernádi Gyula	Somló Tamás	Jeney Zoltán
KÁR A BENZINÉRT	1964	MAFILM 3. Játékfilmstúdió	Bán Frigyes	Bencsik Imre	Hegyi Barnabás	Bágya András
KARAMBOL	1964	MAFILM 1. Játékfilmstúdió	Máriássy Félix	Máriássy Judit	Illés György	Vincze Imre, Gonda János
MÁR NEM OLYAN IDŐKET ÉLÜNK	1964	MAFILM 4. Játékfilmstúdió	Marton Endre	Kállai István	Pásztor István	Gyulai Gaál János
MÁSFÉL MILLIÓ	1964	MAFILM 2. Játékfilmstúdió	Palásthy György	Palásthy György, Tabi László	Hegyi Barnabás	Lovas Ferenc
MIÉRT ROSSZAK A MAGYAR FILMESEK?	1964	MAFILM 4. Játékfilmstúdió	Fejér Tamás	Csurka István	Hegyi Barnabás	Vujicsics Tihamér
MIT CSINÁL A FELSÉGED 3-TÓL 5-IG?	1964	MAFILM 1. Játékfilmstúdió	Makk Károly	Hubay Miklós	Illés György	Petrovics Emil
NÉGY LÁNY EGY UDVARBAN	1964	MAFILM 2. Játékfilmstúdió	Zolnay Pál	Solymár József	Hegyi Barnabás	Berki Géza
ÖZVEGY MENYASSZONYOK	1964	MAFILM 2. Játékfilmstúdió	Gertler Viktor	Bencsik Imre, Borhy Anna, Kovács Nándor	Forgács Ottó	Fényes Szabolcs
RAB RÁBY	1964	MAFILM	Hintsch György	Barabás Tibor	Sík Igor	Hidas Frigyes
VÍZIVÁROSI NYÁR	1964	MAFILM	Fábri Zoltán	Horváth Márton	Hildebrand István	Mihály András
BUTASÁGOM TÖRTÉNETE	1965	MAFILM 3. Játékfilmstúdió	Keleti Márton	Gyárfás Miklós	Hegyi Barnabás	Fényes Szabolcs
FÉNY A REDŐNY MÖGÖTT	1965	MAFILM 3. Játékfilmstúdió	Nádasy László	Szabó Miklós	Hildebrand István	Vujicsics Tihamér
GYEREKBETEGSÉGEK	1965	MAFILM 3. Játékfilmstúdió	Kardos Ferenc, Rózsa János	Kardos Ferenc, Rózsa János	Sára Sándor	Szöllősy András
HÁRY JÁNOS	1965	MAFILM 4. Játékfilmstúdió	Szinetár Miklós	Harsányi Zsolt, Paulini Béla	Tóth János	Kodály Zoltán
HÚSZ ÓRA	1965	MAFILM 1. Játékfilmstúdió	Fábri Zoltán	Köllő Miklós	Illés György	
ISZONY	1965	MAFILM 4. Játékfilmstúdió	Hintsch György	Hintsch György	Hegyi Barnabás	Szokolay Sándor
JÁTÉK A MÚZEUMBAN	1965	MAFILM 2. Játékfilmstúdió	Bán Róbert	Huszty Tamás	Forgács Ottó	Petrovics Emil
A KŐSZÍVŰ EMBER FIAI I-II	1965	MAFILM 4. Játékfilmstúdió	Várkonyi Zoltán	Erdődy János	Hildebrand István	Farkas Ferenc
NEM	1965	MAFILM 3. Játékfilmstúdió	Révész György	Kállai István	Szécsényi Ferenc	Vujicsics Tihamér
AZ ORVOS HALÁLA	1965	MAFILM 2. Játékfilmstúdió	Mamcserov Frigyes	Mamcserov Frigyes, Fekete Gyula	Tóth János	Petrovics Emil
PATYOLAT AKCIÓ	1965	MAFILM 4. Játékfilmstúdió	Fejér Tamás	Örsi Ferenc	Hildebrand István	Gyulai Gaál János, Jereb Ervin, stb.
SZEGÉNYLEGÉNYEK	1965	MAFILM 4. Játékfilmstúdió	Jancsó Miklós	Hernádi Gyula	Somló Tamás	
SZENTJÁNOS FEJVÉTELE	1965	MAFILM 1. Játékfilmstúdió	Novák Márk	Novák Márk, Galambos Jenő	Szécsényi Ferenc	Gonda János
SZERELMES BICIKLISTÁK	1965	MAFILM 1. Játékfilmstúdió	Bacsó Péter	Bacsó Péter	Illés György	Fényes Szabolcs
TILOS A SZERELEM	1965	MAFILM 2. Játékfilmstúdió	Rényi Tamás	Hámos György, Rényi Tamás, Palásthy György	Forgács Ottó	Berki Géza
A TIZEDES MEG A TÖBBIEK	1965	MAFILM 3. Játékfilmstúdió	Keleti Márton	Dobozy Imre, Sász Péter	Pásztor István	Sárközi István
TÍZEZER NAP	1965	MAFILM 4. Játékfilmstúdió	Kósa Ferenc	Gyöngyössy Imre, Kósa Ferenc, Csoóri Sándor	Sára Sándor	Szöllősy András
ZÖLDÁR	1965	MAFILM 4. Játékfilmstúdió	Gaál István	Gyöngyössy Imre, Gaá István	Herczenik Miklós	Szöllősy András
APA	1966	MAFILM 3. Játékfilmstúdió	Szabó István	Szabó István	Sára Sándor	Gonda János
ARANYSÁRKÁNY	1966	MAFILM 1. Játékfilmstúdió	Ranódy László	Illés Endre	Illés György	Szokolay Sándor
BÜDÖSVÍZ	1966	MAFILM 3. Játékfilmstúdió	Bán Frigyes	Markos Miklós	Pásztor István	Patachich Iván
ÉDES ÉS KESERŰ	1966	MAFILM 4. Játékfilmstúdió	Szemes Mihály	Török Sándor	Szécsényi Ferenc	Petrovics Emil
EGY MAGYAR NÁBOB	1966	MAFILM 4. Játékfilmstúdió	Várkonyi Zoltán	Erdődy János	Hildebrand István	Farkas Ferenc
AZ ELSŐ ESZTENDŐ	1966	MAFILM 2. Játékfilmstúdió	Mészáros Gyula	Simonffy András	Forgács Ottó	Láng István
ÉS AKKOR A PASAS...	1966	MAFILM 3. Játékfilmstúdió	Gertler Viktor	Gertler Viktor, Szász Péter	Hildebrand István	Ránki György
A FÉRFI EGÉSZEN MÁS	1966	MAFILM 4. Játékfilmstúdió	Fejér Tamás	Csurka István	Szécsényi Ferenc	Behár György
FÜGEFALEVÉL	1966	MAFILM 1. Játékfilmstúdió	Máriássy Félix	Máriássy Félix	Hegyi Barnabás	Vincze Imre
HARLEKIN ÉS SZERELMESE	1966	MAFILM 4. Játékfilmstúdió	Fehér Imre	Fakan Balázs	Lakatos Iván	Petrovics Emil
HIDEG NAPOK	1966	MAFILM 1. Játékfilmstúdió	Kovács András	Kovács András	Szécsényi Ferenc	
HOGY SZALADNAK A FÁK...	1966	MAFILM 2. Játékfilmstúdió	Zolnay Pál	Zolnay Pál, Módos Péter	Szécsényi Ferenc	Durkó Zsolt
KÁRPÁTHY ZOLTÁN	1966	MAFILM 4. Játékfilmstúdió	Várkonyi Zoltán	Erdődy János	Hildebrand István	Farkas Ferenc
KETTEN HALTAK MEG	1966	MAFILM 2. Játékfilmstúdió	Palásthy György	Mándy Iván	Forgács Ottó	Lovas Ferenc
MINDEN KEZDET NEHÉZ I-II	1966	MAFILM 1. Játékfilmstúdió	Révész György	Komlós János, Kellér Dezső, Tabi László, Nádasdy László	Illés György	Vujicsics Tihamér
NEM SZOKTAM HAZUDNI	1966	MAFILM 3. Játékfilmstúdió	Kárpáti György	Lelekes Éva	Vagyóczky Tibor	Lendvay Kamilló
OTHELLO GYULAHÁZÁN	1966	MAFILM	Zsurzs Éva	Litványi Károly, Katona Márta	Czabarka György	Behár György
SIKÁTOR	1966	MAFILM 2. Játékfilmstúdió	Rényi Tamás	Rényi Tamás, Kertész Ákos	Forgács Ottó	Berki Géza
SOK HŰSÉG SEMMIÉRT	1966	MAFILM 2. Játékfilmstúdió	Palásthy György	Palásthy György, Gyárfás Miklós	Forgács Ottó	Lovas Ferenc
UTÓSZEZON	1966	MAFILM 1. Játékfilmstúdió	Fábri Zoltán	Szász Péter	Illés György	Fényes Szabolcs
VÁLTOZÓ FELHŐZET	1966	MAFILM 3. Játékfilmstúdió	Keleti Márton	Kuczka Péter	Hildebrand István	Hidas Frigyes
BOHÓC A FALON	1967	MAFILM 3. Játékfilmstúdió	Sándor Pál	Sándor Pál, Tóth Zsuzsa	Zsombolyai János	Tamássy Zdenkó
BOLONDOS VAKÁCIÓ	1967	MAFILM 3. Játékfilmstúdió - koprodukció	Makk Károly	Kállai István, Katona Ferenc, Dimitru Carabat, Dan Desliu	Sergiu Huzum, Constantin Stefanescu	George Grigoriu
CSILLAGOSOK, KATONÁK	1967	MAFILM 4. Játékfilmstúdió - koprodukció	Jancsó Miklós	Hernádi Gyula, Georgij Mdivani, Jancsó Miklós	Somló Tamás	
EGY SZERELEM HÁROM ÉJSZAKÁJA	1967	MAFILM 1. Játékfilmstúdió	Révész György	Hubay Miklós, Vas István	Somló Tamás	Ránki György
EZEK A FIATALOK	1967	MAFILM 4. Játékfilmstúdió	Banovich Tamás	Banovich Tamás, Abody Béla	Vagyóczky Tibor	Szörényi Levente, Illés Lajos, Sztevanovity Zorán, Shöck Ottó
FIÚK A TÉRRŐL	1967	MAFILM 3. Játékfilmstúdió	Szász Péter	Hámori Ottó	Vagyóczky Tibor	Illés Lajos, Dobos Attila
JAGUÁR	1967	MAFILM, MTV	Dömölky János	Borhy Anna	Bíró Miklós	Tamássy Zdenkó
KÁRTYAVÁR	1967	MAFILM 4. Játékfilmstúdió	Hintsch György	Hintsch György, Deme Gábor	Hildebrand István	Durkó Zsolt
KERESZTELŐ	1967	MAFILM 4. Játékfilmstúdió	Gaál István	Gaál István	Herczenik Miklós	Szöllősy András
KÖTELÉK	1967	MAFILM 1. Játékfilmstúdió	Máriássy Félix	Máriássy Félix	Tóth János	Vincze Imre
LÁSSÁTOK FELEIM	1967	MAFILM 3. Játékfilmstúdió	Fazekas Lajos	Fazekas Lajos	Szécsényi Ferenc	Durkó Zsolt
A MÚMIA KÖZBESZÓL	1967	MAFILM 1. Játékfilmstúdió	Oláh Gábor	Oláh Gábor	Lakatos Iván	Gonda János
NEM VÁROK HOLNAPIG	1967	MAFILM 4. Játékfilmstúdió	Kormos Gyula	Komlós János	Pásztor István	Láng István
NYÁR A HEGYEN	1967	MAFILM 1. Játékfilmstúdió	Bacsó Péter	Bacsó Péter, Zimre Péter	Zsombolyai János	Fényes Szabolcs
AZ ÖZVEGY ÉS A SZÁZADOS	1967	MAFILM 2. Játékfilmstúdió	Palásthy György	Kopányi György	Forgács Ottó	Lovas Ferenc
SZEVASZ VERA	1967	MAFILM 3. Játékfilmstúdió	Herskó János	Herskó János, Bíró Zsuzsa	Zsombolyai János	Petrovics Emil
TANULMÁNY A NŐKRŐL	1967	MAFILM 3. Játékfilmstúdió	Keleti Márton	Gyárfás Miklós	Hildebrand István	Fényes Szabolcs
ÜNNEPNAPOK	1967	MAFILM 3. Játékfilmstúdió	Kardos Ferenc	Kardos Ferenc	Sára Sándor	Szöllősy András
A VÖLGY	1967	MAFILM 2. Játékfilmstúdió	Rényi Tamás	Hernádi Gyula	Forgács Ottó	Mihály András
ALFA RÓMEÓ ÉS JÚLIA	1968	MAFILM 4. Játékfilmstúdió	Mamcserov Frigyes	Hámos György	Lakatos Iván	Gyulai Gaál János
A BESZÉLŐ KÖNTÖS	1968	MAFILM 4. Játékfilmstúdió	Fejér Tamás	Fejér Tamás	Herczenik Miklós	Ránki György
CSEND ÉS KIÁLTÁS	1968	MAFILM 4. Játékfilmstúdió	Jancsó Miklós	Hernádi Gyula	Kende János	
EGRI CSILLAGOK I-II	1968	MAFILM 4. Játékfilmstúdió	Várkonyi Zoltán	Nemeskürty István	Szécsényi Ferenc	Farkas Ferenc
ELSIETETT HÁZASSÁG	1968	MAFILM 3. Játékfilmstúdió	Keleti Márton	Gyárfás Miklós	Somló Tamás	Fényes Szabolcs
ELTÁVOZOTT NAP	1968	MAFILM 4. Játékfilmstúdió	Mészáros Márta	Mészáros Márta	Somló Tamás	Szörényi Levente
FALAK	1968	MAFILM 1. Játékfilmstúdió	Kovács András	Kovács András	Illés György	Mikisz Theodorakisz
FEJLÖVÉS	1968	MAFILM 1. Játékfilmstúdió	Bacsó Péter	Bacsó Péter, Zimre Péter	Zsombolyai János	Körmendi Vilmos
FELDOBOTT KŐ	1968	MAFILM 3. Játékfilmstúdió	Sára Sándor	Sára Sándor, Csoóri Sándor, Kósa Ferenc	Sára Sándor	Szöllősy András
FÉNYES SZELEK	1968	MAFILM 1. Játékfilmstúdió	Jancsó Miklós	Hernádi Gyula	Somló Tamás	Vass Lajos
A HAMIS IZABELLA	1968	MAFILM 3. Játékfilmstúdió	Bácskai Lauró István	Bencsik Imre	Herczenik Miklós	Gyulai Gaál János
HAZAI PÁLYA	1968	MAFILM 2. Játékfilmstúdió	Palásthy György	Bencsik Imre	Forgács Ottó	Lovas Ferenc
HOLDUDVAR	1968	MAFILM 1. Játékfilmstúdió	Mészáros Márta	Mészáros Márta	Kende János	Szörényi Levente
A HOLTAK VISSZAJÁRNAK	1968	MAFILM, MOKÉP, MTV	Wiedermann Károly	Pintér József	Neumann László	Stark Tibor
ISTEN ÉS EMBER ELŐTT	1968	MAFILM 3. Játékfilmstúdió	Makk Károly	Galambos Lajos	Tóth János	Vujicsics Tihamér
MI LESZ VELED ESZTERKE?	1968	MAFILM 4. Játékfilmstúdió	Bán Róbert	Müller Péter	Herczenik Miklós	Petrovics Emil
A PÁL UTCAI FIÚK	1968	MAFILM - koprodukció	Fábri Zoltán	Fábián Zoltán	Illés György	Petrovics Emil
PRÓFÉTA VOLTÁL SZÍVEM	1968	MAFILM 2. Játékfilmstúdió	Zolnay Pál	Somogyi Tóth Sándor, Zolnay Pál, Szécsényi Ferenc	Szécsényi Ferenc	Durkó Zsolt
TILTOTT TERÜLET	1968	MAFILM 4. Játékfilmstúdió	Gábor Pál	Gábor Pál, Vészi Endre	Zsombolyai János	
AZ UTOLSÓ KÖR	1968	MAFILM 3. Játékfilmstúdió	Gertler Viktor	Hubay Miklós, Vészi Endre	Szécsényi Ferenc	Petrovics Emil, Zege együttes
A VERÉB IS MADÁR	1968	MAFILM 4. Játékfilmstúdió	Hintsch György	Kállai István	Hildebrand István	Dobos Attila
AZ ALVILÁG PROFEESSZORA	1969	MAFILM 2. Játékfilmstúdió	Szemes Mihály	Radványi Dezső	Forgács Ottó	Eötvös Péter
BŰBÁJOSOK	1969	MAFILM 3. Játékfilmstúdió	Rózsa János	Kardos István	Lőrincz József	Szörényi Levente
EGY ŐRÜLT ÉJSZAKA	1969	MAFILM 3. Játékfilmstúdió	Kardos Ferenc	Kardos Ferenc	Kende János	Eötvös Péter
AZ IDŐ ABLAKAI	1969	MAFILM 4. Játékfilmstúdió	Fejér Tamás	Fejér Tamás, Kuczka Péter	Herczenik Miklós	Gyulai Gaál János
IMPOSZTOROK	1969	MAFILM 1. Játékfilmstúdió	Máriássy Félix	Máriássy Judit	Illés György	Vincze Imre
ISMERI A SZANDI MANDIT?	1969	MAFILM 3. Játékfilmstúdió	Gyarmathy Lívia	Böszörményi Géza	Somló Tamás	Tamássy Zdenkó
ISTEN HOZTA, ŐRNAGY ÚR!	1969	MAFILM 1. Játékfilmstúdió	Fábri Zoltán	Fábri Zoltán	Illés György	Mihály András
KREBSZ, AZ ISTEN	1969	MAFILM 2. Játékfilmstúdió	Rényi Tamás	Müller Péter	Herczenik Miklós	Berki Géza
A NAGY KÉK JELZÉS - AVAGY A HŰSÉG JUTALMA	1969	MAFILM 1. Játékfilmstúdió	Nádasy László	Hegedűs Zoltán	Ragályi Elemér	Vujicsics Tihamér
AZ OROSZLÁN UGRANI KÉSZÜL	1969	MAFILM 1. Játékfilmstúdió	Révész György	Révész György	Illés György, Hildebrand István	Szörényi Levente
AZ ÖRÖKÖS	1969	MAFILM 2. Játékfilmstúdió	Palásthy György	Köllő Miklós	Forgács Ottó	Lovas Ferenc
POKOLRÉV	1969	MAFILM 3. Játékfilmstúdió	Markos Miklós	Galambos Lajos, Markos Miklós	Lakatos Iván	Mihály András
SIROKKÓ	1969	MAFILM - koprodukció	Jancsó Miklós	Hernádi Gyula	Kende János	Vujicsics Tihamér
SZEMÜVEGESEK	1969	MAFILM 3. Játékfilmstúdió	Simó Sándor	Simó Sándor	Kenyeres Gábor	Tamássy Zdenkó
SZERESSÉTEK ODOR EMÍLIÁT!	1969	MAFILM 3. Játékfilmstúdió	Sándor Pál	Tóth Zsuzsa, Sándor Pál	Zsombolyai János	Tamássy Zdenkó
SZIGET A SZÁRAZFÖLDÖN	1969	MAFILM 4. Játékfilmstúdió	Elek Judit	Mándy Iván	Ragályi Elemér	Körmendi Vilmos
A TANÚ	1969	MAFILM 1. Játékfilmstúdió	Bacsó Péter	Bacsó Péter	Zsombolyai János	Vukán György
TÖRTÉNELMI MAGÁNYÜGYEK	1969	MAFILM 3. Játékfilmstúdió	Keleti Márton	Gyárfás Miklós	Hildebrand István	
A VARÁZSLÓ	1969	MAFILM 2. Játékfilmstúdió	Palásthy György	Török Sándor, Tóth Eszter	Forgács Ottó	Lovas Ferenc
VIRÁGVASÁRNAP	1969	MAFILM 1. Játékfilmstúdió	Gyöngyössy Imre	Gyöngyössy Imre	Szécsényi Ferenc	Sárosi Bálint
A GYILKOS A HÁZBAN VAN	1970	MAFILM 4. Játékfilmstúdió	Bán Róbert	Csizmarek Mátyás	Zsombolyai János	Gonda János
A HALHATATLAN LÉGIÓS - AKIT CSAK PÉHOVARDNAK HÍVTAK	1970	MAFILM 4. Játékfilmstúdió	Somló Tamás	Somló Tamás	Banok Tibor	
ARC	1970	MAFILM 2. Játékfilmstúdió	Zolnay Pál	Zolnay Pál, Köllő Miklós	Ragályi Elemér	Petrovics Emil
CSAK EGY TELEFON	1970	MAFILM 2. Játékfilmstúdió	Mamcserov Frigyes	Fehér Klára	Forgács Ottó	Vujicsics Tihamér
ÉGI BÁRÁNY	1970	MAFILM 1. Játékfilmstúdió	Jancsó Miklós	Hernádi Gyula	Kende János	
ÉN VAGYOK, JEROMOS	1970	MAFILM 2. Játékfilmstúdió	Tímár István	Jeli Ferenc, Szeberényi Lehel	Illés György	Lendvay Kamilló
ÉRIK A FÉNY	1970	MAFILM 2. Játékfilmstúdió	Szemes Mihály	Kamondy László	Somló Tamás	Durkó Zsolt
GYULA VITÉZ TÉLEN-NYÁRON	1970	MAFILM 3. Játékfilmstúdió	Bácskai Lauró István	Polgár András	Herczenik Miklós	Vukán György
HORIZONT	1970	MAFILM 4. Játékfilmstúdió	Gábor Pál	Gábor Pál, Marosi Gyula	Zsombolyai János	Gonda János
ÍTÉLET	1970	MAFILM 3. Játékfilmstúdió	Kósa Ferenc	Kósa Ferenc, Csoóri Sándor	Sára Sándor	Cornel Țăranu
KITÖRÉS	1970	MAFILM 1. Játékfilmstúdió	Bacsó Péter	Konrád György, Bacsó Péter	Zsombolyai János	Vukán György
MAGASISKOLA	1970	MAFILM 4. Játékfilmstúdió	Gaál István	Gaál István	Ragályi Elemér	Szöllősy András
MÉRSÉKELT ÉGÖV	1970	MAFILM 4. Játékfilmstúdió	Kézdi-Kovács Zsolt	Kézdi-Kovács Zsolt	Kende János	Gonda János
N.N. A HALÁL ANGYALA	1970	MAFILM 3. Játékfilmstúdió	Herskó János	Herskó János, Bíró Zsuzsa	Zsombolyai János	Vukán György
STAFÉTA	1970	MAFILM 1. Játékfilmstúdió	Kovács András	Kovács András	Ragályi Elemér	
SZEMTŐL SZEMBE	1970	MAFILM 4. Játékfilmstúdió	Várkonyi Zoltán	Dobozy Imre	Illés György	
SZÉP LEÁNYOK, NE SÍRJATOK!	1970	MAFILM 1. Játékfilmstúdió	Mészáros Márta	Zimre Péter	Kende János	Baksa Soós János, Orszáczky Miklós, Sztevanovity Zorán, Frenreisz Károly, Szörényi Levente, Tolcsvay László
SZÉP MAGYAR KOMÉDIA	1970	MAFILM 4. Játékfilmstúdió	Banovich Tamás	Banovich Tamás, Garai Gábor	Kende János	Vujicsics Tihamér
SZERELEM	1970	MAFILM 1. Játékfilmstúdió	Makk Károly	Déry Tibor	Tóth János	Mihály András
SZERELMESFILM	1970	MAFILM 3. Játékfilmstúdió	Szabó István	Szabó István	Lőrincz József	Gonda János
SZERELMI ÁLMOK I-II.	1970	MAFILM 3. Játékfilmstúdió	Keleti Márton	Keszi Imre, Leonnyid Del	Hildebrand István	
UTAZÁS A KOPONYÁM KÖRÜL	1970	MAFILM 1. Játékfilmstúdió	Révész György	Révész György	Illés György	Ránki György
A LEGSZEBB FÉRFIKOR	1971	MAFILM 2. Játékfilmstúdió	Simó Sándor	Simó Sándor	Zsombolyai János	Tamássy Zdenkó
A SÍPOLÓ MACSKAKŐ	1971	MAFILM 2. Játékfilmstúdió	Gazdag Gyula	Gazdag Gyula, Györffy Miklós	Andor Tamás	Illés Lajos, Keres Tibor, Szabolcsi Tibor
CSÁRDÁSKIRÁLYNŐ	1971	MAFILM 4. Játékfilmstúdió	Szinetár Miklós	Mischa Mleinek, Szinetár Miklós	Bíró Miklós	Kálmán Imre
FEKETE VÁROS I-II	1971	MAFILM 1. Játékfilmstúdió	Zsurzs Éva	Thurzó Gábor	Czabarka György	Szöllősy András
HAHÓ, A TENGER!	1971	MAFILM 2. Játékfilmstúdió	Palásthy György	Török Sándor	Forgács Ottó	Lovas Ferenc
HAHÓ, ÖCSI!	1971	MAFILM 2. Játékfilmstúdió	Palásthy György	Török Sándor	Forgács Ottó	Lovas Ferenc
HANGYABOLY	1971	MAFILM 1. Játékfilmstúdió	Fábri Zoltán	Fábián Zoltán, Illés Endre	Illés György	
HOLT VIDÉK	1971	MAFILM 4. Játékfilmstúdió	Gaál István	Gaál István	Zsombolyai János	Szöllősy András
JELENIDŐ	1971	MAFILM 1. Játékfilmstúdió	Bacsó Péter	Bacsó Péter, Zimre Péter	Zsombolyai János	Vukán György
JÓ ESTÉT NYÁR, JÓ ESTÉT SZERELEM I-II.	1971	MAFILM 1. Játékfilmstúdió	Szőnyi G. Sándor	Fejes Endre	Bornyi Gyula	Ránki György
KAPASZKODJ A FELLEGEKBE	1971	MAFILM	Szász Péter	Szász Péter	Szécsényi Ferenc, Barcs Sándor	Fényes Szabolcs
MADÁRKÁK	1971	MAFILM 2. Játékfilmstúdió	Böszörményi Géza	Gyarmathy Lívia, Böszörményi Géza	Ragályi Elemér	Presser Gábor
MÉG KÉR A NÉP	1971	MAFILM 1. Játékfilmstúdió	Jancsó Miklós	Hernádi Gyula	Kende János	Cseh Tamás, Sebő Ferenc
MEZTELEN VAGY	1971	MAFILM 1. Játékfilmstúdió	Gyöngyössy Imre	Gyöngyössy Imre, Kabay Barna	Kende János	Petrovics Emil
REMÉNYKEDŐK	1971	MAFILM 4. Játékfilmstúdió	Rényi Tamás	Müller Péter	Zsombolyai János	Berki Géza
SÁRIKA, DRÁGÁM	1971	MAFILM 2. Játékfilmstúdió	Sándor Pál	Tóth Zsuzsa	Ragályi Elemér	Tamássy Zdenkó
SZINDBÁD	1971	MAFILM 1. Játékfilmstúdió	Huszárik Zoltán	Huszárik Zoltán	Sára Sándor	Jeney Zoltán
VÉGRE HÉTFŐ	1971	MAFILM 2. Játékfilmstúdió	Kenyeres Gábor	Kardos István	Andor Tamás	Tamássy Zdenkó
BOB HERCEG	1972	MAFILM, MTV	Keleti Márton	Békeffy István	Sík Igor	Huszka Jenő, Hidas Frigyes
ÁRVÁCSKA	1976	Budapest Stúdió	Ranódy László	Ranódy László, Elek Judit	Sára Sándor	Maros Rudolf
BUDAPESTI MESÉK	1976	Hunnia Stúdió	Szabó István	Szabó István	Sára Sándor	Tamássy Zdenkó
FEKETE GYÉMÁNTOK	1976	Budapest Stúdió	Várkonyi Zoltán	Várkonyi Zoltán, Erdődy János	Illés György	Petrovics Emil
HERKILESFÜRDŐI EMLÉK	1976	Hunnia Stúdió	Sándor Pál	Tóth Zsuzsa	Ragályi Elemér	Tamássy Zdenkó
A KARD	1976	Budapest Stúdió	Dömölky János	Dömölky János, Csurka István	Zsombolyai János	Tamássy Zdenkó
KILENC HÓNAP	1976	Hunnia Stúdió	Mészáros Márta	Hernádi Gyula, Kóródy Ildikó, Mészáros Márta	Kende János	Kovács György
A KIRÁLYLÁNY ZSÁMOLYA	1976	Budapest Stúdió	Fejér Tamás	Fejér Tamás	Hildebrand István	Berki Géza
KÍSÉRTET LUBLÓN	1976	Budapest Stúdió	Bán Róbert	Bán Róbert, Molnár Gál Péter	Somló Tamás	Petrovics Emil
LABIRINTUS	1976	Budapest Stúdió	Kovács András	Kovács András	Kende János	Demjén Ferenc, Fenyő Miklós, Sípos Péter
AZ ÖTÖDIK PECSÉT	1976	Budapest Stúdió	Fábri Zoltán	Fábri Zoltán	Illés György	Vukán György
PÓKFOCI	1976	Objektív Stúdió	Rózsa János	Kardos István	Ragályi Elemér	Bródy János
SZÉPEK ÉS BOLONDOK	1976	Hunnia Stúdió	Szász Péter	Szász Péter	Koltai Lajos	Vukán György. Presser Gábor, LGT
TALPUK ALATT FÜTYÜL A SZÉL	1976	Hunnia Stúdió	Szomjas György	Szomjas György, Zimre Péter	Ragályi Elemér	Sebő Ferenc
TEKETÓRIA	1976	Hunnia Stúdió	Maár Gyula	Maár Gyula	Koltai Lajos	Selmeczi György, Cseh Tamás
TÓTÁGAS	1976	Hunnia Stúdió	Palásthy György	Horgas Béla	Forgács Ottó	Lendvay Kamilló
TÜKÖRKÉPEK	1976	Hunnia Stúdió	Szörény Rezső	Szörény Rezső	Jankura Péter	Tamássy Zdenkó
ZONGORA A LEVEEGŐBEN	1976	Budapest Stúdió	Bacsó Péter	Bacsó Péter	Zsombolyai János	Vukán György
AMERIKAI CIGARETTA	1977	Budapest Stúdió	Dömölky János	Csurka István	Koltai Lajos	Presser Gábor
APÁM NÉHÁNY BOLDOG ÉVE	1977	Hunnia Stúdió	Simó Sándor	Simó Sándor	Andor Tamás	Tamássy Zdenkó
A CSILLAGSZEMŰ	1977	Hunnia Stúdió	Markos Miklós	Markos Miklós	Bornyi Gyula	Szokolay Sándor
DÜBÖRGŐ CSEND	1977	Budapest Stúdió	Szíjj Miklós	Szíjj Miklós	Lőrincz József	Durkó Zsolt
EGY ERKÖLCSÖS ÉJSZAKA	1977	Dialóg Stúdió	Makk Károly	Örkény István, Bacsó Péter	Tóth János	
ÉKEZET	1977	Objektív Stúdió	Kardos Ferenc	Kardos István	Kende János	Szörényi Levente
FEDŐNEVE: LUKÁCS	1977	Hunnia Stúdió - koprodukció	Manosz Zahariasz, Köő Sándor	Julij Dunszkij, Valerij Frid	Kende János	Vukán György
FILMREGÉNY - HÁROM NŐVÉR	1977	Budapest Stúdió	Dárday István	Dárday István, Szalai György	Koltai Lajos, Pap Ferenc	Holló József
K.O.	1977	Budapest Stúdió	Rényi Tamás	Müller Péter	Zsombolyai János	Berki Géza, Presser Gábor
KÉT ELHATÁROZÁS	1977	MAFILM Híradó- és Dokumentumfilm Stúdio - koprodukció	Gyöngyössy Imre, Kabay Barna	Gyöngyössy Imre, Kabay Barna	Szabó Gábor	
A KÉTFENEKŰ DOB	1977	Objektív Stúdió	Gazdag Gyula	Gazdag Gyula, Györffy Miklós	Ragályi Elemér	Charles Adams
KI LÁTOTT ENGEM?	1977	Budapest Stúdió	Révész György	Hubay Miklós	Szécsényi Ferenc	Mihály András
KIHAJOLNI VESZÉLYES	1977	Dialóg Stúdió	Zsombolyai János	Simonffy András	Ragályi Elemér	Presser Gábor
KÍSÉRTÉS	1977	Hunnia Stúdió	Esztergályos Károly	Esztergályos Károly, Szántó Erika	Bíró Miklós	Petrovics Emil, Eisemann Mihály
A KÖZÖS BŰN	1977	Hunnia Stúdió	Mihályfi Imre	Galgóczi Erzsébet	Szécsényi Ferenc	Vukán György
LEGATO	1977	Budapest Stúdió	Gaál István	Szász Imre, Gaál István	Illés György	Szöllősy András
MAGYAROK	1977	Dialóg Stúdió	Fábri Zoltán	Fábry Zoltán	Illés György	Vukán György
A NÉMA DOSSZIÉ	1977	Budapest Stúdió	Mészáros Gyula	Falus György, Mészáros Gyula	Hildebrand István	Körmendi Vilmos
ŐK KETTEN	1977	Dialóg Stúdió	Mészáros Márta	Kóródy Ildikó, Balázs József	Kende János	Kovács György
RIASZTÓLÖVÉS	1977	Dialóg Stúdió	Bacsó Péter	Bacsó Péter	Zsombolyai János	Vukán György
SÁMÁN	1977	Hunnia Stúdió	Zolnay Pál	Gyurkó László, Zolnay Pál, Székely Orsolya	Ragályi Elemér	Sebő Ferenc, Halmos Béla, Koltay Gergely, Sebestyén Márta
VERI AZ ÖRDÖG A FELESÉGÉT	1977	Hunnia Stúdió	András Ferenc	András Ferenc, Bereményi Géza, Kertész Ákos	Koltai Lajos	Kovács György
80 HUSZÁR	1978	Objektív Stúdió	Sára Sándor	Csoóri Sándor, Sára Sándor	Sára Sándor	Szöllősy András
ALLEGRO BARBARO	1978	Dialóg Stúdió, Objektív Stúdió	Jancsó Miklós	Hernády Gyula, Jancsó Miklós	Kende János	Rossa László, Berki László
ANGI VERA	1978	Objektív Stúdió	Gábor Pál	Gábor Pál, Vészi Endre	Koltai Lajos	Selmeczi György
ÁRAMÜTÉS	1978	Dialóg Stúdió	Bacsó Péter	Bacsó Péter	Andor Tamás	Vukán György
BÚÉK!	1978	Objektív Stúdió	Szörény Rezső	Módos Péter, Szörény Rezső	Zsombolyai János	Tamássy Zdenkó, Buda László
CSÉPLŐ GYURI	1978	Hunnia Stúdió, Balázs Béla Stúdió	Schiffer Pál	Kemény István, Schiffer Pál	Andor Tamás	
CSILLAG A MÁGLYÁN	1978	Budapest Stúdió	Ádám Ottó	Ádám Ottó	Illés György	Hidas Frigyes, Vukán György
DÓRA JELENTI	1978	Budapest Stúdió	Bán Róbert	Zimre Péter, Kertész Ákos	Herczenik Miklós	Petrovics Emil
EGYSZEREGY	1978	Budapest Stúdió	Kardos Ferenc	Kardos István	Kende János	Szörényi Levente
AZ ERŐD	1978	Budapest Stúdió	Szinetár Miklós	Hernádi Gyula, Szinetár Miklós	Bíró Miklós	Presser Gábor
FAGYÖNGYÖK	1978	Hunnia Stúdió	Ember Judit	Ember Judit	Illés János	Döme Zsolt
FOGJUK MEG ÉS VIGYÉTEK	1978	Budapest Stúdió	Oláh Gábor	Oláh Tamás, Oláh Gábor	Banok Tibor	Jeney Zoltán
HATHOLDAS RÓZSAKERT	1978	Budapest Stúdió	Ranódy László	Ranódy László, Nádasy László	Illés György	Hidas Frigyes
KEMÉNYKALAP ÉS KRUMPLIORR	1978	Hunnia Stúdió	Bácskai Lauró István	Csukás István	Ráday Mihály	Aldobolyi Nagy György
KINEK A TÖRVÉNYE?	1978	Dialóg Stúdió	Szőnyi G. Sándor	Galgóczi Erzsébet	Ráday Mihály	Vízöntő együttes
MAGYAR RAPSZÓDIA	1978	Dialóg Stúdió	Jancsó Miklós	Hernády Gyula, Jancsó Miklós	Kende János	Rossa László, Berki László
A MÉNESGAZDA	1978	Objektív Stúdió, Dialóg Stúdió	Kovács András	Kovács András	Koltai Lajos	
NEM ÉLHETEK MUZSIKASZÓ NÉLKÜL	1978	Dialóg Stúdió	Sík Ferenc	Thurzó Gábor	Andor Tamás	
OLYAN, MINT OTTHON	1978	Hunnia Stúdió	Mészáros Márta	Kóródy Ildikó	Koltai Lajos	Somló Tamás
ROSSSZEMBEREK	1978	Hunnia Stúdió	Szomjas György	Dobai Péter, Szomjas György	Halász Mihály	Sebő Ferenc
SZABADÍTS MEG A GONOSZTÓL	1978	Hunnia Stúdió	Sándor Pál	Tóth Zsuzsa	Ragályi Elemér	Presser Gábor, LGT
TÍZ ÉV MÚLVA	1978	Budapest Stúdió	Lányi András	Lányi András	Kardos Sándor	Gyarmati István, Neoton Família
A TROMBITÁS	1978	Obijektív Stúdió, Hunnia Stúdió	Rózsa János	Kardos István	Ragályi Elemér	Szörényi Levente
KORKEDVEZMÉNY	1979	Híradó- és Dokumentumfilm Stúdió ?	Magyar József	Magyar József	Banok Tibor	Szigeti Ferenc
AJÁNDÉK EZ A NAP	1979	Budapest Stúdió	Gothár Péter	Gothár Péter, Zimre Péter	Koltai Lajos	Selmeczi György
AZ ÁLDOZAT	1979	Hunnia Stúdió	Dobray György	Juhász Sándor, Dobray György	Bornyi Gyula	Presser Gábor
BÉKEIDŐ	1979	Budapest Stúdió	Vitézy László	Szalai Györgyi	Pap Ferenc	Erkel Ferenc, Kodály Zoltán
BIZALOM	1979	Objektív Stúdió	Szabó István	Szabó István	Koltai Lajos	Polgár Tibor
CSONTVÁRY	1979	Hunnia Stúdió	Huszárik Zoltán	Császár István	Jankura Péter	Kocsár Miklós
ÉGIGÉRŐ FŰ	1979	Budapest Stúdió	Palásthy György	Rényi Tamás, Zimre Péter	Szabó Gábor	Berki Géza
ÉLVE VAGY HALVA	1979	Budapest Stúdió	Rényi Tamás	Rényi Tamás, Zimre Péter	Szabó Gábor	Berki Géza
HARCMODOR	1979	Dialóg Stúdió	Dárday István	Szalai Györgyi	Koltai Lajos, Pap Ferenc	
HOGYAN FELEJTSÜK EL ÉLETÜNK LEGNAGYOBB SZERELMÉT...?	1979	Dialóg Stúdió	Szász Péter	Szász Péter	Andor Tamás	Aldobolyi Nagy György
KENTAUROK I-II	1979	Dialóg Stúdió - koprodukció	Vytautas Zalakevicius	Vytautas Zalakevicius	Pavel Lebesev	
KÉT TÖRTÉNET A FÉLMÚLTBÓL	1979	Dialóg Stúdió	Makk Károly	Makk Károly	Lukács Lóránt	
KI BESZÉL ITT SZERELEMRŐL?	1979	Dialóg Stúdió	Bacsó Péter	Bacsó Péter	Andor Tamás	Vukán György. Mini együttes
A KIS VALENTINO	1979	Hunnia Stúdió	Jeles András	Jeles András	Kardos Sándor	
KOPORTOS	1979	Hunnia Stúdió - koprodukció	Gyarmathy Lívia	Gyarmathy Lívia, Balázs József	Pap Ferenc	
MAJD HOLNAP	1979	Hunnia Stúdió	Elek Judit	Pethő György	Ragályi Elemér	
MESE HABBAL	1979	Objektív Stúdió	Bácskai Lauró István	Maár Gyula, Kardos G. György	Zsombolyai János	Selmeczi György
MINDEN SZERDÁN	1979	Dialóg Stúdió	Gyarmathy Lívia	Marosi Gyula, Gyarmathy Lívia	Pap Ferenc	Kovács György
NAPLEMENTE DÉLBEN	1979	Budapest Stúdió	Hintsch György	Illés Endre	Somló Tamás	Durkó Zsolt
OKTÓBERI VASÁRNAP	1979	Dialóg Stúdió - koprodukció	Kovács András	Kovács András	Lugossy István	
ORVOS VAGYOK	1979	MAFILM Híradó- és Dokumentumfilm Stúdio - koprodukció	Gyöngyössy Imre	Petényi Katalin, Gyöngyössy Imre, Kabay Barna	Szabó Gábor	
TÖREDÉK AZ ÉLETRŐL	1979	Dialóg Stúdió	Gyöngyössy Imre, Kabay Barna	Gyöngyössy Imre, Kabay Barna	Szabó Gábor	Selmeczi György
ÚTKÖZBEN	1979	Dialóg Stúdió - koprodukció	Mészáros Márta	Jan Nowicki, Marek Piwowski, Mészáros Márta	Andor Tamás	Zygmunt Konieczny
UTOLSÓ ELŐTTI ÍTÉLET	1979	Hunnia Stúdió	Grunwalsky Ferenc	Grunwalsky Ferenc, Bereményi Géza, Hernádi Gyula	Ragályi Elemér	Szakcsi Lakatos Béla
VASÁRNAPI SZÜLŐK	1979	Objektív Stúdió	Rózsa János	Kardos István, Rózsa János	Ragályi Elemér	Szörényi Levente
VESZÉLYES JÁTÉKOK	1979	Budapest Stúdió - koprodukció	Fejér Tamás	Janikovszky Éva. Rolf Péter	Jankura Péter	Fényes Szabolcs
BALLAGÁS	1980	Dialóg Stúdió	Almási Tamás	Nagy András, Almási Tamás	Máriássy Ferenc	EDDA, Neoton Família
BOLDOG SZÜLETÉSNAPOT, MARILYN!	1980	Objektív Stúdió	Szörényi Rezső	Szörényi Rezső, Vámos Miklós	Andor Tamás	Tamássy Zdenkó
BOLDOGTALAN KALAP	1980	Budapest Stúdió	Sós Mária	Sós Mária	Szabó Gábor	Presser Gábor
CIRCUS MAXIMUS	1980	Objektív Stúdió	Radványi Géza	Radványi Géza, Máriássy Judit, Makk Károly	Sára Sándor	Fényes Szabolcs
CSEREPEK	1980	Budapest Stúdió	Gaál István	Gaál István	Lőrincz József	Szöllősy András
DÉDELGETETT KEDVENCEINK	1980	Dialóg Stúdió	Szalai György	Dárday István	Pap Ferenc	Koncz Tibor, EDDA
FÁBIÁN BÁLINT TALÁLKOZÁSA ISTENNEL	1980	Dialóg Stúdió	Fábri Zoltán	Fábián Zoltán	Illés György	Vukán György
HALADÉK	1980	Hunnia Stúdió	Fazekas Lajos	Módos Péter, Fazekas Lajos	Koltai Lajos	Vukán György
KOJAK BUDAPESTEN	1980	Budapest Stúdió	Szalkai Sándor	Kállai István, Szalkai Sándor	Lakatos Iván	Kovács György
KÖSZÖNÖM, MEGVAGYUNK	1980	Budapest Stúdió	Lugossy László	Kardos István	Lőrincz József	
ÖRÖKSÉG	1980	Hunnia Stúdió	Mészáros Márta	Kóródy Ildikó, Mészáros Márta	Ragályi Elemér	Döme Zsolt, Fényes Szabolcs
A POGÁNY MADONNA	1980	Budapest Stúdió	Mészáros Gyula	Bujtor István, Mészáros Gyula	Hildebrand István	Aldobolyi Nagy György
PSYCHÉ I-II	1980	Hunnia Stúdió	Bódy Gábor	Bódy Gábor, Csaplár Vilmos	Hildebrand István	Vidovszky László
A SVÉD, AKINEK NYOMA VESZETT	1980	Dialóg Stúdió - Koprodukció	Bacsó Péter	Wolfgang Mühlbauer, Bacsó Péter	Andor Tamás	
SZABADGYALOG	1980	Objektív Stúdió	Tarr Béla	Tarr Béla	Pap Ferenc, Mihók Barna	Szabó András, Hobo Blues Band, Neoron Família, Minerva
SZÍNES TINTÁKRÓL ÁLMODOM	1980	Budapest Stúdió	Ranódy László	Karcsay Kulcsár István, Ranódy László, Szántó Erika	Koltai Lajos	Jeney Zoltán
VÁMMENTES HÁZASSSÁG	1980	Hunnia Stúdió - koprodukció	Zsombolyai János	Kóródy Ildikó, Kertész Ákos, Matti Ijas, Fábry Sándor	Ragályi Elemér	Benkő László
ANNA	1981	Hunnia Stúdió - koprodukció	Mészáros Márta	Hernádi Gyula, Mészáros Márta	Andor Tamás	Döme Zsolt
CHA-CHA-CHA	1981	Objektív Stúdió	Kovácsi János	Kovácsi János	ifj. Jancsó Miklós	Fenyő Miklós
FOGADÓ AZ ÖRÖK VILÁGOSSÁGHOZ	1981	Budapest Stúdió	Bán Róbert	Molnár Gál Péter	Kende János	Petrovics Emil
IDEIGLENES PARADICSOM	1981	Dialóg Stúdió	Kovács András	Kovács András	Illés György	Vukán György
KABALA	1981	Objektív Stúdió	Rózsa János	Kardos István, Rózsa János	Ragályi Elemér	Szörényi Levente
KETTÉVŰÉT MENNYEZET	1981	Budapest Stúdió	Gábor Pál	Vészi Endre, Gábor Pál	ifj. Jancsó Miklós	Selmeczi György
KOPASZKUTYA	1981	Hunnia Stúdió	Szomjas György	Kardos István, Szomjas György	Halász Mihály	Póka Egon, Pálma Zoltán, Deák Bill Gyula
MEGÁLL AZ IDŐ	1981	Budapest Stúdió	Gothár Péter	Bereményi Géza, Gothar Péter	Koltai Lajos	Selmeczi György
MEPHISTO I-II	1981	Objektív Stúdió - koprodukció	Szabó István	Dobai Péter, Szabó István	Koltai Lajos	Tamássy Zdenkó, Reinitz Béla
A MÉRKŐZÉS	1981	Objektív Stúdió	Kósa Ferenc	Kósa Ferenc	Sára Sándor	Hajdú Sándor
NYOM NÉLKÜL	1981	Hunnia Stúdió	Fábry Péter	Fábry Péter, Nemes István	Péterffy András	Dés László, Dimenzió együttes
A PÁRTFOGOLT	1981	Hunnia Stúdió	Schiffer Pál	Schiffer Pál	Andor Tamás, ifj. Jancsó Miklós	EDDA
A REMÉNY JOGA	1981	Objektív Stúdió	Kézdi-Kovács Zsolt	Kézdi-Kovács Zsolt	Zsombolyai János	Szörényi Levente
REQUIEM	1981	Dialóg Stúdió	Fábry Zoltán	Fábry Zoltán	Illés György	Vukán György
RIPACSOK	1981	Hunnia Stúdió	Sándor Pál	Tóth Zsuzsa, Sándor Pál	Ragályi Elemér	Presser Gábor
SZELEBURDI CSALÁD	1981	Dialóg Stúdió	Palásthy György	Bálint Ágnes, Palásthy György	Kardos Sándor	Tamássy Zdenkó, Fényes Szablcs
SZÍVZŰR	1981	Objektív Stúdió	Böszörményi Géza	Balázs József, Böszörményi Géza	Jankura Péter	Kovács György, Tamássy Zdenkó
TEGNAPELŐTT	1981	Dialóg Stúdió	Bacsó Péter	Bacsó Péter	Andor Tamás	Vukán György
A TRANSZPORT	1981		Szurdi András	Kuczka Péter	Nemescsói Tamás	
A ZSARNOK SZÍVE, AVAGY BOCCACCIO MAGYARORSZÁGON	1981	Budapest Stúdió - koprodukció	Jancsó Miklós	Hernádi Gyula, Jancsó Miklós	Kende János	Orbán György, Simon Zoltán, Cseh Tamás
GUERNICA	1982	MAFILM - koprodukció	Kósa Ferenc	Kósa Ferenc	Koltai Lajos	Benkő László
VIADUKT / THE SILVESTER SYNDROME	1982	MAFILM - koprodukció	Simó Sándor	Egon Eis	Andor Tamás	Tamássy Zdenkó
CSAK SEMMI PÁNIK	1982	Budapest Stúdió	Szőnyi G. Sándor	Bujtor István	Bornyi Gyula	Frenreisz Károly
DÖGKESELYŰ	1982	Dialóg Stúdió	András Ferenc	Munkácsi Miklós, Andrási Ferenc	Ragályi Elemér	Kovács György, Vukán György
EGYMÁSRA NÉZVE	1982	Dialóg Stúdió	Makk Károly	Galgóczi Erzsébet, Makk Károly	Andor Tamás	Dés László, Másik János
ELVESZETT ILLÚZIÓK	1982	Objektív Stúdió	Gazdag Gyula	Győrffy Miklós, Gazdag Gyula, Spiró György	ifj. Jancsó Miklós	Márta István
HATÁSVADÁSZOK	1982	Dialóg Stúdió	Szurdi Miklós	Szurdi Miklós, Várkonyi Péter Endre, Verebes István	Szalai András	Döme Zsolt
NAPLÓ GYERMEKEIMNEK	1982	Budapest Stúdió	Mészáros Márta	Mészáros Márta	ifj. Jancsó Miklós	Döme Zsolt
NÉVTELEN VÁR	1982	Budapest Stúdió	Zsurzs Éva	Zsurzs Éva, Molnár Gál Péter	Lukács Lóránt	Hidas Frigyes
ROHANJ VELEM	1982	Hunnia Stúdió	Markos Miklós	Asperján György	Illés György	Madarász Iván
SÉRTÉS	1982	Dialóg Stúdió, MTV, MOKÉP	Bacsó Péter	Bacsó Péter	Andor Tamás	Fényes Szabolcs
SZERENCSÉS DÁNIEL	1982	Hunnia Stúdió	Sándor Pál	Tóth Zsuzsa	Ragályi Elemér	Selmeczi György
TALPRA, GYŐZŐ!	1982	Objektív Stúdió	Szörény Rezső	Sükösd Mihály, Szörény Rezső	Jankura Péter	Tamássy Zdenkó
VÉRSZERZŐDÉS	1982	Dialóg Stúdió	Dobray György	Horváth Péter	Szabó Gábor	Babos Gyula
VISSZAESŐK	1982	Objektív Stúdió	Kézdi-Kovács Zsolt	Kézdi-Kovács Zsolt	Kende János	
VŐLEGÉNY	1982	Budapest Stúdió	Vámos László	Müller Péter	Szabó Gábor	Aldobolyi Nagy György
A KLAPKA-LÉGIÓ	1983	MAFILM, MTV, MOKÉP	Hajdufy Miklós	Hajdufy Miklós	Gulyás Buda	Orbán György
ANGYALI ÜDVÖZLET	1983	Hunnia Stúdió	Jeles András	Jeles András	Kardos Sándor	Márta István
BOSZORKÁNYSZOMBAT	1983	Objektív Stúdió	Rózsa János	Kardos István	Kende János	Tamássy Zdenkó
A CSODA VÉGE	1983	Hunnia Stúdió	Vészi János	Kőszegi Edit, Vészi János	Máthé Tibor	Vészi János
DÉLIBÁBOK ORSZÁGA	1983	Budapest Stúdió	Mészáros Márta	Vargha Balázs	ifj. Jancsó Miklós	Döme Zsolt
ESZKIMÓ ASSZONY FÁZIK	1983	Dialóg Stúdió	Xantus János	Xantus János	Matkócsik András	Lukin Gábor, Víg Mihály, Másik János
FELHŐJÁTÉK	1983	Hunnia Stúdió	Maár Gyula	Maár Gyula	Novák Emil	Selmeczi György
GYERTEK EL A NÉVNAPOMRA	1983	Dialóg Stúdió	Fábri Zoltán	Fábri Zoltán	Illés György	Vukán György
HANYATT-HOMLOK	1983	Budapest Stúdió	Révész György	Vámos Miklós	Szécsényi Ferenc	KFT Együttes, Lengyelfi Miklós
HÁZASSÁG SZABADNAPPAL	1983	Budapest Stúdió	Mészáros Gyula	Romhányi József	Nemescsói Tamás	Aldobolyi Nagy György
HOSSZÚ VÁGTA	1983	Objektív Stúdió - koprodukció	Gábor Pál	W.W. Lewis	Ragályi Elemér	Charles Gross
KÖNNYŰ TESTI SÉRTÉS	1983	Hunnia Stúdió	Szomjas György	Grunwalsky Ferenc, Szomjas György	Grunwalsky Ferenc	Somló Tamás
MÁRIA-NAP	1983	Objektív Stúdió	Elek Judit	Pethő György	Novák Emil	
MENNYEI SEREGEK	1983	Budapest Stúdió	Kardos Ferenc	Kardos István	Koltai Lajos	Selmeczi György
SZEGÉNY DZSONI ÉS ÁRNIKA	1983	Budapest Stúdió	Sólyom András	Sólyom András	Mertz Loránd	Márta István
SZERETŐK	1983	Dialóg Stúdió	Kovács András	Kovács András	Bíró Miklós	Presser Gábor
TE RONGYOS ÉLET	1983	Dialóg Stúdió	Bacsó Péter	Bacsó Péter	Andor Tamás	Vukán György
ÓRIÁS	1984	MAFILM, MTV	Szántó Erika	Szántó Erika	Zádori Ferenc	Szunyogh Balázs
EGY KICSIT ÉN...EGY KICSIT TE	1984	Dialóg Stúdió	Gyarmathy Lívia	Böszörményi Géza, Kardos Csaba	Pap Ferenc	Selmeczi György
AZ ÉLET MUZSIKÁJA - KÁLMÁN IMRE	1984	Dialóg Stúdió - koprodukció	Palásthy György	Jurij Nagibin	Herczenik Miklós	
ESZMÉLÉS	1984	Hunnia Stúdió	Grunwalsky Ferenc	Grunwalsky Ferenc	Máthé Tibor	ifj. Kurtág György, Péterdi Péter
ESZTERLÁNC	1984	Budapest Stúdió	Péterffy András	Vörös Éva	Kurucz Sándor	Jeney Zoltán, Maros Rudolf, Oroszlán György, Balázs Árpád
ISTVÁN, A KIRÁLY	1984	Budapest Stúdió	Koltay Gábor	Boldizsár Miklós, koltay Gábor, Bródy János, Szörényi Levente	Andor Tamás, Dávid Zoltán, Halom József, Kende János, Mertz Loránd, Novák Emil, Szabó Gábor, Tamár Péter	Szörényi Levente, Szörényi Szabolcs
JÁTSZANI KELL	1984	Dialóg Stúdió - koprodukció	Makk Károly	Frank Cucci	John Lindley, Andor Tamás	Fényes Szabolcs
MEGFELELŐ EMBER KÉNYES FELADATRA	1984	Objektív Stúdió - koprodukció	Kovács János	Kovács János, Juha Vakkuri	ifj. Jancsó Miklós	Várkonyi Mátyás
REDL EZREDES	1984	Objektív Stúdió - koprodukció	Szabó István	Szabó István, Dobay Péter	Koltai Lajos	Tamássy Zdenkó
SORTŰZ EGY FEKETE BIVALYÉRT	1984	Objektív Stúdió - koprodukció	Szabó László	Szabó László, Jeli Ferenc, András Ferenc	Kende János	Petrovics Emil
SZIRMOK, VIRÁGOK, KOSZORÚK	1984	Budapest Stúdió	Lugossy László	Kardos István, Lugossy László	Ragályi Elemér	Selmeczi György
URAMISTEN	1984	Hunnia Stúdió	Gárdos Péter	Osváth András, Gárdos Péter	Máthé Tibor	Novák János
VALAKI FIGYEL	1984	Hunnia Stúdió	Lányi András	Lányi András	Kardos Sándor	Papp Zoltán
VÖRÖS GRÓFNŐ I-II	1984	Dialóg Stúdió, MTV, MOKÉP, Hungarofilm	Kovács András	Kovács András	Bíró Miklós	Vidovszky László
YERMA	1984	Hunnia Stúdió - koprodukció	Gyöngyössy Imre, Kabay Barna	Gyöngyössy Imre, Kabay Barna, Petényi Katalin	Szabó Gábor	Peskó Zoltán
CSAK EGY MOZI	1985	Hunnia Stúdió	Sándor Pál	Molnár Gál Péter, Sándor Pál	Ragályi Elemér	
EGÉSZSÉGES EROTIKA	1985	Dialóg Stúdió	Tamár Péter	Tamár Péter	Kardos Sándor	Szörényi Levente, Fenyő Miklós, Presser Gábor, Tardos Péter, Payer András
ELSŐ KÉTSZÁZ ÉVEM	1985	Objektív Stúdió	Maár Gyula	Maár Gyula	Márk Iván	
FALFÚRÓ	1985	Hunnia Stúdió	Szomjas György	Szomjas György	Grunwalsky Ferenc	Karácsony János
GYERMEKRABLÁS A PALÁNKA UTCÁBAN	1985	Dialóg Stúdió	Mihályfy Sándor	Nógrádi Gábor, Mihályfy Sándor	Baranyai László	Selmeczi György
HÁNY AZ ÓRA, VEKKER ÚR?	1985	Objektív Stúdió	Bacsó Péter	Bacsó Péter	Andor Tamás	Vukán György
HÜLYESÉG NEM AKADÁLY	1985	Dialóg Stúdió	Xantus János	Xantus János, Kóródy Ildikó	Matkócsik András	Másik János, Lukin Gábor
IDŐ VAN	1985	Hunnia Stúdió	Gothár Péter	Esterházy Péter, Gothár Péter	Dávid Zoltán	Selmeczi György
KÉPVADÁSZOK	1985	Dialóg Stúdió	Szurdi András, Szurdi Miklós	Szurdi András, Szurdi Miklós	Szalai András	Döme Zsolt
ORFEUSZ ÉS EURYDIKÉ	1985	Budapest Stúdió, MOKÉP	Gaál István	Gaál István	Sára Sándor	
A REJTŐZKÖDŐ	1985	Objektív Stúdió	Kézdi-Kovács Zsolt	Kézdi-Kovács Zsolt	Kende János	Sáry László
SZERELEM ELSŐ VÉRIG	1985	Dialóg Stúdió	Dobray György, Horváth Péter	Dobray György, Horváth Péter	Andor Tamás	Dés László
A TANÍTVÁNYOK	1985	Budapest Stúdió	Bereményi Géza	Bereményi Géza	Kardos Sándor	
VÁROSBÚJÓCSKA	1985	Budapest Stúdió	Sós Mária	Sós Mária, Rozgonyi Ádám	Szabó Gábor	Jiri Stivin, Másik János, Európa Kiadó
AKLI MIKLÓS	1986	Budapest Stúdió	Révész György	Révész György	Szécsényi Ferenc	Márta István, Szörényi Levente
BANÁNHÉJ KERINGŐ	1986	Hunnia Stúdió	Bacsó Péter	Bacsó Péter	Andor Tamás	Vukán György, Fényes Szabolcs
CSÓK, ANYU	1986	Objektív Stúdió	Rózsa János	Rózsa János, Vámos Miklós	Ragályi Elemér	Bródy János
DOKTOR MINORKA VIDOR NAGY NAPJA	1986	Hunnia Stúdió	Sólyom András	Békés Pál	Mertz Lóránd	Márta István
ELYSIUM	1986	Budapest Stúdió - koprodukció	Szántó Erika	Schulze Éva	Zádori Ferenc	
ÉRZÉKENY BÚCSÚ A FEJEDELEMTŐL	1986	Dialóg Stúdió	Vitézy László	Vitézy László, Hankiss Ágnes	Jankura Péter	Márta István
GONDVISELÉS	1986	Budapest Stúdió, MTV	Pál Erdőss	Kardos István	Pap Ferenc, Sas Tamás	Balázs Ferenc
HAJNALI HÁZTETŐK	1986	Budapest Stúdió, MTV	Dömölky János	Dömölky János, Ottlik Géza	Koltai Lajos	Tamássy Zdenkó
HOL VOLT, HOL NEM VOLT....	1986	Objektív Stúdió	Gazdag Gyula	Győrffy Miklós, Gazdag Gyula	Ragályi Elemér	Márta István
LAURA	1986	Objektív Stúdió	Böszörményi Géza	Böszörményi Géza	Pap Ferenc	Selmeczi György, Balázs Ferenc
MALOM A POKOLBAN	1986	Hunnia Stúdió	Maár Gyula	Moldova György, Maár Gyula	Márk Iván	
A NAGY GENERÁCIÓ	1986	Dialóg Stúdió	András Ferenc	Bereményi Géza, András Ferenc	Ragályi Elemér	Kovács György
SZAMÁRKÖHÖGÉS	1986	Hunnia Stúdió	Gárdos Péter	Osváth András, Gárdos Péter	Máthé Tibor	Novák János
SZÖRNYEK ÉVADJA	1986	Dialóg Stúdió	Jancsó Miklós	Hernádi Gyula, Jancsó Miklós	Kende János	Simon Zoltán, Cseh Tamás
VAKVILÁGBAN	1986	Dialóg Stúdió, MTV	Gyarmathy Lívia	Marosi Gyula, Gyarmathy Lívia	Pap Ferenc	Balázs Ferenc, Sándor Jenő, Fényes Szabolcs, Dobsa Sándor
A MENYASSZONY GYÖNYÖRŰ VOLT	1987	MAFILM - koprodukció	Gábor Pál	Lucio Manlio Battistrada, Enzo Lauretta, Stefano Milioto, Gábor Pál	Kende János	Nicola Piovani
HÓTREÁL	1987	Hunnia Stúdió	Szabó Ildikó	Szabó Ildikó	Dávid Zoltán	Másik János
"ISTEN VELETEK, BARÁTAIM"	1987	Hunnia Stúdió, MTV	Simó Sándor	Bíró Zsuzsa, Simó Sándor	Andor Tamás	Tamássy Zdenkó
AZ ÉN XX. SZÁZADOM	1988	MAFILM - koprodukció	Enyedi Ildikó	Enyedi Ildikó	Máthé Tibor	Vidovszky László
KÜLDETÉS EVIANBA	1988	MAFILM - koprodukció	Szántó Erika	Szántó Erika	Szabó Gábor	Fényes Szabolcs
NYITOTT ABLAK	1988	MAFILM, Dialóg Filmstúdió, Vidám Színpad, Ramovill	Bednai Nándor	Bednai Nándor, Szenes Iván	Illés György	Fényes Szabolcs
SZTÁLIN MENYASSZONYA	1990	MAFILM - koprodukció	Bacsó Péter	Vlagyimir Tyendrjakov	Köllő Miklós, Bacsó Péter	Jörg Schoch, Uli Goldhahn
ÉDES EMMA, DRÁGA BÖBE	1991	MAFILM Audio Kft - koprodukció	Szabó István	Szabó István	Koltai Lajos	Móricz Mihály, Bornai Tibor, Nagy Fero
ÉS MÉGIS...	1991	MAFILM, Budapest Filmstúdió, Obijektív Filmstúdió	Kézdi-Kovács Zsolt	Kézdi-Kovács Zsolt	Sára Balázs	Bernáth Sándor
SZERELMES SZÍVEK	1991	MAFILM Audio Kft, Filmproducer Kft., Sámson Holding Kft, Dialóg Filmstúdió	Dobray György	Mészöly Gábor	Halász Gábor	Fenyő Miklós
A BROOKLYNI TESTVÉR	1994	MAFILM, Hunnia Filmstúdió	Gárdos Péter	Gárdos Péter, Osváth András, Bíró Zsuzsa, Tóth Zsuzsa	Máthé Tibor	Novák János
CSAJOK	1995	MAFILM - koprodukció	Szabó Ildikó	Szabó Ildikó	Jankura Péter	Másik János
MEGINT TANÚ	1995	Focus Film, MTM Cinnefilm, MTV, Fotex, MAFILM	Bacsó Péter	Bacsó Péter, Fábry Sándor	Andor Tamás	Vukán György, Creative Art Ensemble
GYILKOS KEDV	1996	MAFILM Rt., Hétfői Műhely Stúdió alapítvány	Erdőss Pál	Kardos István	Pap Ferenc	Másik János
RETÚR	1996	Film Art, Telefilm, MMKA, Mafilm	Palásthy György	Palásthy György	Illés György	Hollós Máté
SZTRACSATELLA	1996	Objektív Filmstúdió, MTV, MAFILM	Kern András	Kern András	Ragályi Elemér	Presser Gábor
WITMAN FIÚK	1997	MAFILM - koprodukció	Szász János	Szász János	Máthé Tibor	
A HÍDEMBER	2002	Mafilm Invest, FilmArt, NET Entertainment, MTV	Bereményi Géza	Bereményi Géza, Can Togay	Kardos Sándor	Másik János
A BOLDOGSÁG SZÍNE	2003	MAFILM, MTV, FilmArt	Pacskovszky József	Pacskovszky József	Gózon Francisco	Ando Drom, Sonoton Music Library

Films made with Mafilm (incomplete list)
Year	Title	Director	Producer
1968	The Fixer	John Frankenheimer	Metro-Goldwyn-Mayer
1970	First Love	Maximilian Schell	Alfa Film
1971	Das falsche Gewicht	Bernhard Wicki	Intertel
1972	Bluebeard	Edward Dmytryk	Barnabé Production
1975	Love and Death	Woody Allen	Charles H. Joffe Production
1977	The Prince and the Pauper	Richard Fleischer	Alexander Salkind
1977	Anna Karenina	Basil Coleman	BBC
1978	The Ninth Configuration	William Peter Blatty	Blatty-Pepsico
1980	Escape to Victory	John Huston	Lorimar Pictures
1981	Sphinx	Franklin J. Schaffner	Orion Pictures
1982	The Phantom of the Opera	Robert Markowitz	Robert Halmi Inc.
1982	Die Weiße Rose	Michael Verhoeven	Sentana Film, München
1983	Édith et Marcel	Claude Lelouch	Les Films 13 – Parafrance Films
1983	For Those I Loved	Robert Enrico	Producteurs Associes, Paris
1985	War and Love	Moshé Mizrahi	Stafford Productions
1985	Anna Karenina	Simon Langton	Ray Stoyk Productions
1985	Mata Hari	Curtis Harrington	Cannon Films
1985	Lionheart	Franklin J. Schaffner	Taliafilm II
1986	Of Pure Blood	Joseph Sargent	Warner Bros TV
1987	Terminus	Pierre-William Glenn	Les Film du Cheval de Fer
1987	Hanna's War	Menahem Golan	Cannon Film Inc.
1987	Lena: My 100 Children	Edwin Sherin	Robert Greenwald Prod.
1988	Red Heat	Walter Hill	Carolco Production Services
1989	Mack the Knife	Menahem Golan	Cannon Film Inc.
1989	A Connecticut Yankee in the Court of King Arthur	Mel Damski	Round Table Prods. N.V.
1989	Seven Minutes	Klaus Maria Brandauer	Mutoscope Film
1989	Cyrano de Bergerac	Jean-Paul Rappeneau	Hachette Premiere & Cie
1989	The Nightmare Years	Anthony Page	Consolidated
1989	Music Box	Costa-Gavras	Carolco Production Services
1989	The Phantom of the Opera	Dwight H. Little	Cannon Screen Entertainment
1989	Dracula	Roger Cardinal	Misha TV Prod.
1990	Hudson Hawk	Michael Lehmann	Joel Silver
1992	Maigret	James Cellan Jones	Granada Television (UK)
1993	M. Butterfly	David Cronenberg	Warner Brothers
1993	Charlemagne	Clive Donner	Pathe TV – Lux S.p.a.
1993	Cadfael	Graham Theakston	Central Films
1994	A Kid in King Arthur's Court	Michael Gottlieb	Tapestry Films (USA)
1994	Tales from the Zoo	Philippe de Broca	Son et Lumire, Paris
1995	Laughter in the Dark	Uli Edel	Treehouse - Interimages
1995	Snow White and the 7 Dwarfs	Luca Damiano	Luca Damiano Entertainment
1996	Evita	Alan Parker	Parker-Stigwood-Vajna
1996	The Hunchback	Peter Medak	Alliance Communication – Turner / TMA
1998	A Knight in Camelot	Roger Young	Gillott - Rosemont
1999	Jakob the Liar	Peter Kassovitz	Columbia Pictures
2000	In the Beginning	Kevin Connor	Hallmark Entertainment
2001	Spy Game	Tony Scott	Universal Studios - Beacon Communications
2001	All the Queen's Men	Stefan Ruzowitzky	Streamline Filmproduction GmbH
2002	Napoléon	Yves Simoneau	GMT - KirchMedia
2002	I Spy	Betty Thomas	Blue Sky Prod. Ltd.
2002	Sniper 2	Craig R. Baxley	TriStar Pictures
2002	Dinotopia	Marco Brambilla	Walt Disney – ABC - Hallmark
2002	Underworld	Len Wiseman	Lakeshore Entertainment
2003	Being Julia	István Szabó	Alliance Pictures
2003	The Lion in Winter	Andrei Konchalovsky	Hallmark Entertainment
2004	A Christmas Carol	Arthur Allan Seidelman	Hallmark Entertainment
2005	Fateless	Lajos Koltai	
2005	The Collector	Anthony Atkins	Collector Productions
2005	Day of Wrath	Adrian Rudomin	Azucar Entertainment
2005	The Moon and the Stars	John Irvin	Buskin Film
2005	Copying Beethoven	Agnieszka Holland	Sidney Kimmel Entertainment
2006	Eragon	Stefen Fangmeier	Fox 2000 pictures
2006	Robin Hood	Graeme Harper	Tiger Aspect Productions
2006	The Company	Mikael Salomon	Sony Television
2006	Amusement	John Simpson	New Line Cinema
2007	John Adams	Tom Hooper	HBO
2007	The Secret of Moonacre	Gábor Csupó	Forgan – Smith Entertainment
2008	The Boy in the Striped Pyjamas	Mark Herman	Miramax Films
2008	Season of the Witch	Dominic Sena	Relativity Media
2009	The Round Up	Roselyne Bosch	Légende Films
2009	The Pillars of the Earth	Sergio Mimica-Gezzan	Tandem Entertainment
2009	Going Postal	Jon Jones	All3 Media International
2009	Memories of Anne Frank	Alberto Negrin	Italian International Film
2009	The Dept	John Madden	Miramax Films, Marv Films, Pioneer Pictures
2010	The Raven	James McTeigue	Intrepid Pictures
2010	Magic Boys	Róbert Koltai	B & B Entertainment Group
2010	Monte Carlo	Thomas Bezucha	Fox 2000 Pictures
2010	Isenhart: The Hunt Is on for Your Soul	Hansjörg Thurn	Ninety-Minute Film
2010	Bel Ami	Declan Donnellan	Redwave Films
2011	World Without End	Michael Caton-Jones	Tandem Communications
2011	Asterix and Obelix: God Save Britannia	Laurent Tirard	Fidelité Films
2012	The Hundred-Year-Old Man Who Climbed Out of the Window and Disappeared	Felix Herngren	Nice Flx Pictures
2013	Dracula	Andy Goddard	NBC Universal Television
2013	Fleming: The Man Who Would Be Bond	Mat Whitecross	BBC America
2013	Kenau	Maarten Treurniet	Fu Works

== Infrastructure ==
=== Stages in Budapest ===
Soundstage	Notes	Area
"H" Stage	Most of the time rented by a Hungarian commercial channel for different tv productions. It was renovated in 2014.	385 m^{2}
"Fábri" Stage	Most of the time rented by a Hungarian commercial channel for different tv productions. It was renovated in 2014.	830 m^{2}

=== Stages and backlots in Fót ===
Soundstage	Notes	Area
S1 "Máriássy Félix"	Was built in 1978	1,070 m^{2}
S2 "Huszárik Zoltán"	Was built in 1978. Burnt down in July 2007. In November 2009 the renovated new studio has been opened.	1,623 m^{2}
Stage S3–S4	Shared stages, full area about 5,000 m^{2}.	2,285 m^{2} 2,315 m^{2}
Stage S5–S6	Shared stages, full area about 5,000 m^{2}.	2,285 m^{2} 2,315 m^{2}

==== Outdoor backlots ====
Backlots	Notes	Area
Medieval backlot	First time the set is used for a Hungarian tv movie adaptation of Hamlet in 1984. The backlot has been extended since then. It has various interior and exterior spaces. There are a medieval courtyard, marketplace, tavern, prison, cloister and a throne-room.	15,000 m^{2}
19th century city set	There are street fronts of 26 buildings, marketplace and its surrounding streets and alleys. The city set divided by "river" and bridge are also included. First time the set is used for a Hungarian big budget period drama Most vagy soha! (2024)	5,200 m^{2} + 2,000 m^{2} roof set
American suburb	Was built in 2020, which consists of four American suburban houses and a small street. The end of the street there is a haunted house front.	2,500 m^{2}
Haunted house	Next to the "American suburb" backlot. Only the facade.	–
Western village	First time the set is used for the miniseries Houdini (2014). Has been rebuilt several times. 360-degree tracking shot could be used on the set.	2,000 m^{2}

==== Outdoor water tank ====
The filmstudio has an outdoor water tank, which has a capacity of 4,695 m^{3} and depth of 6.5 meters.

== Bibliography ==
- Lajta Andor. Filmművészeti Évkönyv az 1920. évre. Bp. 1920.
- Dr. Janovics Jenő. A magyar film gyermekévei Erdélyben. Bp. Filmkultura. 1936.
- Nemeskürty István. A mozgóképtől a filmművészetig. A magyar filmesztétika története. (1907 – 1930.) Bp. Magvető Kiadó, 1961.
- Nemeskürty István. A magyar film története. (1912 – 1963.) Bp. Gondolat Kiadó, 1965.
- Nemes Károly. A magyar filmművészet története 1957 és 1967 között. Bp. Magyar Filmtudományi Intézet és Filmarchívum, 1978.
- Langer István. Fejezetek a filmgyár történetéből. I. kötet. 1917–1944. Kézirat. Bp. 1979.
- Nemes Károly. A magyar filmművészet története 1968 és 1972 között. Bp. Magyar Filmtudományi Intézet és Filmarchívum, 1979.
- Nemeskürty István. A képpé varázsolt idő. A magyar film története és helye az egyetemes kultúrában, párhuzamos áttekintéssel a világ filmművészetére. Bp. Magvető Könyvkiadó, 1984.
- Kulik, Karol. Alexander Korda: The Man Who Could Work Miracles. Virgin Books, 1990.
- Szilágyi Gábor. Tűzkeresztség. A magyar játékfilm története 1945–1953. Bp. Magyar Filmintézet, 1992.
- Kőháti Zsolt. Tovamozduló ember tovamozduló világban – a magyar némafilm 1896–1931 között. Bp. Magyar Filmintézet, 1996.
- Szabó Zoltán Attila. Volt egyszer egy Filmgyár. (Mafilm-sztori 1976–2000) Bp. Greger-Delacroix, 2000.
- Cunningham, John. Hungarian Cinema: From Coffee House to Multiplex. London. Wallflower Press, 2004.

== Related Pages ==
- Corvin Film Factory
- Hunnia Film Factory

== Further informations ==
- Promotional video about NFI Studios (in English)
