= Félix Máriássy =

Hungarian film director

- Born: 3 June 1919; Márkusfalva, Hungary
- Died: 26 January 1975 (aged 55); Szőny, Hungary
- Occupations: Film editor; Film director
- Years active: 1942–1974

Félix Máriássy (1919–1975) was a Hungarian film editor and director.

== Selected filmography ==
=== Director ===
- Mrs. Szabó (1949)
- The Marriage of Katalin Kis (1950)
- Full Steam Ahead (1951)
- Relatives (1954)
- A Glass of Beer (1955)
- Springtime in Budapest (1955)
- Suburban Legend (1957)
- The Smugglers (1958)
- Sleepless Years (1959)
- Bábolna, 1964 (1964)
- Imposztorok (1969)

=== Editor ===
- The Perfect Family (1942)
- African Bride (1944)
- Devil Rider (1944)
- Masterless Woman (1944)
- It Happened in Budapest (1944)
- Treasured Earth (1948)
- Valahol Európában (1948)
- Gala Suit (1949)

== Bibliography ==
- Burns, Bryan. World Cinema: Hungary. Fairleigh Dickinson University Press, 1996.
- Cunningham, John. Hungarian Cinema: From Coffee House to Multiplex. Wallflower Press, 2004.
