= György Révész =

Hungarian screenwriter and film director

- Born: 16 October 1927
- Died: 2 April 2003 (aged 75)
- Occupation(s): Director, screenplay writer

György Révész (16 October 1927 – 2 April 2003) was a Hungarian screenwriter and film director.

== Selected filmography ==
Director

- At Midnight (1957)
- What a Night! (1958)
- Danger on the Danube (1961)
- Fagyosszentek (1962)
- Land of Angels (1962)
- Three Nights of Love (1967)
- The Lion Is Ready To Jump (1969)
- A Journey Around My Skull (1970)
- Kakuk Marci (1973)
- The Pendragon Legend (1974)
- Akli Miklós (1986)

== Bibliography ==
- Burns, Bryan. World Cinema: Hungary. Fairleigh Dickinson University Press, 1996.
