= Károly Makk =

Hungarian film director (1925–2017)

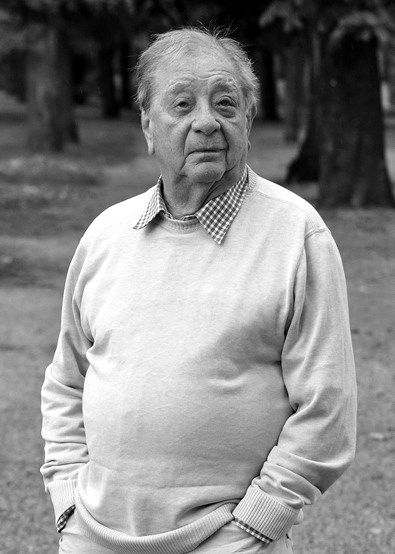
- Born: 22 December 1925; Berettyóújfalu, Hungary
- Died: 30 August 2017 (aged 91); Budapest, Hungary
- Occupations: Film director, screenwriter
- Years active: 1954 – 2017

Károly Makk (December 22, 1925 – August 30, 2017) was a Hungarian film director and screenwriter. Five of his films were nominated for the Palme d'Or at the Cannes Film Festival; however, he won lesser awards at Cannes and elsewhere. He was born in Berettyóújfalu, Hungary.

In 1973 he was a member of the jury at the 8th Moscow International Film Festival. In 1980, he was a member of the jury at the 30th Berlin International Film Festival. His film A Long Weekend in Pest and Buda (2003) was entered into the 25th Moscow International Film Festival. From September 27, 2011, he was the president of the Széchenyi Academy of Literature and Arts.

== Select filmography ==
- Underground Colony (1951)
- Liliomfi (1954)
- Ward 9 (1955)
- Tale on the Twelve Points (1957)
- The House Under the Rocks (1958)
- Lost Paradise (1962)
- Love (1971) - Won the Jury Prize at the Cannes Film Festival in 1971
- Cats' Play (1972) - Nominated for Academy Award for Best Foreign Language Film in 1974
- A Very Moral Night (1977)
- Deadly Game (1982)
- Another Way (1982) - Won the award for Best Actress at the 1982 Cannes Film Festival
- Lily in Love (1984)
- The Last Manuscript (1987)
- Hungarian Requiem (1991)
- The Gambler (1997) - about the writing of Fyodor Dostoyevsky's novella by the same name
- A Long Weekend in Pest and Buda (2003)
- The Way You Are (2010)
