= List of Hungarian films since 1990 =

This is a list collecting the most notable films produced in Hungary and in the Hungarian language during 1990–2026.

== 1990s ==
Title	Director	Cast	Genre	Notes
1990
Eszterkönyv	Krisztina Deák	Eszter Nagy-Kálózy, András Bálint, Károly Eperjes	Drama	
Tutajosok	Judit Elek	Pál Hetényi, András Stohl, Sándor Gáspár, Pieczka Franciszek	Drama	
Napló apámnak, anyámnak	Márta Mészáros	Zsuzsa Czinkóczi, Jan Nowicki	Biography drama	
Az erdő kapitánya	Attila Dargay	László Csákányi (voice), János Gálvölgyi (voice)	Animation adventure comedy	
Szédülés	János Szász	Tamás Jordán, Zoltán Hegyi	Drama	
Vattatyúk	Mária Dobos	Gabriella Juhász	Comedy crime	
És mégis…	Zsolt Kézdi-Kovács	András Kozák, Irén Bordán	Drama	
Sárkány és papucs	Tibor Hernádi	István Sztankay (voice), Éva Almási (voice), János Gálvölgyi (voice)	Animation	
1991
Félálom	János Rózsa	Csaba Újvári, Bernadett Visy, Zsolt Gazdag	Drama	
Hamis a baba	István Bujtor	István Bujtor, András Kern	Comedy crime	
Itt a szabadság!	Péter Vajda	Péter Andorai	Drama	Entered into the 17th Moscow International Film Festival
Magyar rekviem	Károly Makk	György Cserhalmi	Drama	
Halálutak és angyalok	Zoltán Kamondi	Enikő Eszenyi	Drama	Screened at the 1991 Cannes Film Festival
A hetedik testvér	Jenő Koltai, Tibor Hernádi	Csongor Szalay (voice), Balázs Simonyi (voice), Álmos Elõd (voice)	Animated fantasy-comedy-drama	
Szerelmes szívek	György Dobray	Szandi, Péter Andorai	Comedy musical romance	
Szoba kiáltással	János Xantus	Klára Falvay, András Fekete, Andrzej Ferenc	Drama	
Találkozás Vénusszal	István Szabó	Glenn Close, Niels Arestrup	Comedy drama romance	
1992
Édes Emma, drága Böbe - vázlatok, aktok	István Szabó	Johanna ter Steege, Enikő Börcsök	Drama	
Goldberg variációk	Ferenc Grunwalsky	Péter Andorai, Erzsi Cserhalmi		
Kék Duna keringő	Miklós Jancsó	Ildikó Bánsági, György Cserhalmi		
Roncsfilm	György Szomjas	Ági Szirtes, Zoltán Mucsi, Sándor Gáspár, Flóra Kádár		
A nyaraló	Can Togay	Géza Balkay, Mari Törőcsik	Drama	Screened at the 1992 Cannes Film Festival
1993
Children of Iron Gods	Tamás Tóth			Entered into the 18th Moscow International Film Festival
A hercegnő és a kobold	József Gémes	Joss Ackland, Claire Bloom, Roy Kinnear, Sally Ann Marsh, Rik Mayall, Peggy Mount, Peter Murray, Victor Spinetti, Mollie Sugden, Frank Rozelaar Green, William Hootkins, Maxine Howe, Steve Lyons, Robin Lyons	Animated fantasy	
Sose halunk meg	Róbert Koltai	Róbert Koltai, Mihály Szabados, Gábor Máté, Flóra Kádár		
Senkiföldje	András Jeles	Cora Fischer		
Vigyázók	Sándor Sára	Eszter Nagy-Kálózy, Gábor Máté		
Hoppá	Gyula Maár	Dezső Garas	Comedy	Entered into the 43rd Berlin International Film Festival
1994
Utrius	Ferenc Grunwalsky	Mihály Szabados, Ildikó Szücs, Ágnes Csere	Drama	
Ábel a rengetegben	Sándor Mihályfy	Levente Ilyés		
Az igazi Mao	Szilveszter Siklósi	Philip Balla, Margit Huckaby, András Sándor		
A magzat	Márta Mészáros	Adél Kováts	Drama	Entered into the 44th Berlin International Film Festival
Magic Hunter	Ildikó Enyedi	Gary Kemp, Sadie Frost	Fantasy	
Sátántangó	Béla Tarr	Mihály Víg		
Woyzeck	János Szász	Lajos Kovács		
Prinzenbad	Richard Blank	Bernhard Wicki, Ulrich Wildgruber, Róbert Alföldi	Comedy drama	
Három idegen úr	György Molnár	Péter Salgó, Teréz Rudolf, Ádám Baglyas		
1995
My Baby Left Me	Milorad Krstić	Ágnes Gyimesi (voice), Angela Roczkov (voice), András Wahorn (voice)	short animation	
A részleg	Péter Gothár	Mari Nagy, József Szarvas	Drama	Screened at the 1995 Cannes Film Festival
Esti Kornél csodálatos utazása	József Pacskovszky	Gábor Máté, Mátyás Erdély		Entered into the 19th Moscow International Film Festival
A Kid in King Arthur's Court	Michael Gottlieb	Thomas Ian Nicholas, Joss Ackland, Art Malik	Adventure comedy fantasy	
The Real Shlemiel	Albert Hanan Kaminski	Tommy J. Michaels (voice), Tovah Feldshuh (voice), Harry Goz (voice), Stephen D. Newman (voice)	Adventure-fantasy	
Az asszony	János Erdélyi, Dezsö Zsigmond	Anna Györgyi, Károly Eperjes, György Dörner	Drama history	
1996
A három testőr Afrikában	István Bujtor	Gábor Koncz, István Szilágyi, Zoltán Rátóti, Béla Stenczer, Ilus Vay		
Caligula	Sándor Cs. Nagy	Szabolcs Hajdu, Károly Safranek, Éva Rózsáné Zsolnay	Drama	
The Conquest	Gábor Koltay	Franco Nero, Imre Sinkovits		aka The Conquest
Szamba	Róbert Koltai	László Görög, Róbert Koltai		
Sztracsatella	András Kern	András Kern, Enikő Eszenyi, Dorottya Udvaros		
Vaska Easoff	Péter Gothár			
Pepolino and the Treasure of the Mermaid	János Uzsák	Attila Bardóczy (voice), Árpád Besenczi (voice), Paul Bürks (voice)	Animation	
Ezüstnitrát	Marco Ferreri	László Balogh, Éric Berger, Marc Berman	Comedy drama history	
Santa Claus and the Magic Drum	Mauri Kunnas, Pekka Lehtosaari	Esa Saario (voice), Ulla Tapaninen (voice), Henna Haverinen (voice), Olli Parviainen (voice), Aarre Karén (voice)	Animation	
A csónak biztonsága	István Szabó			
A rossz orvos	György Molnár	Anna Kubik, Sándor Gáspár, Dávid Farkas	Drama	
1997
Out of Order	András Kern	András Kern, Róbert Koltai, Kata Dobó		
Csinibaba	Péter Tímár	János Gálvölgyi, Gábor Reviczky, Péter Andorai		
Wittman fiúk	János Szász	Maia Morgenstern	Drama	Screened at the 1997 Cannes Film Festival and the 20th Moscow International Film Festival
Franciska vasárnapjai	Sándor Simó	Éva Kerekes, Dénes Ujlaki		
Long Twilight	Attila Janisch			
Vacak 2 - az erdő hőse	József Gémes, Jenő Koltai	Aaron Bybee (voice), Laura Schulties (voice), Joey Lopez (voice)	Animated comedy-drama	
Tamas and Juli	Ildikó Enyedi		Romance	2000, Seen By... film
A játékos	Károly Makk	Michael Gambon, Jodhi May		
1998
Ámbár tanár úr	Róbert Koltai	Róbert Koltai, Kata Dobó, Judit Hernádi		
Presszó	Tamás Sas	Andrea Fullajtár, Andrea Söptei, Karina Kecskés		
Ábel Amerikában I–II.	Sándor Mihályfy			
Szenvedély	György Fehér	Ildikó Bánsági	Drama	Screened at the 1998 Cannes Film Festival
1999
Kalózok	Tamás Sas	Gabi Gubás, Viktor Bodó, Attila Király		
A napfény íze	István Szabó	Ralph Fiennes, Jennifer Ehle, Flóra Kádár	Historical drama	
Nekem lámpást adott kezembe az Úr Pesten	Miklós Jancsó	Zoltán Mucsi, Péter Scherer		
Simon mágus	Ildikó Enyedi	Péter Andorai		
Cukorkékség	Gergely Pohárnok	Tibor Vécsi, Erika Marozsán		
Európa expressz	Csaba Horváth	Iván Kamarás, Kata Dobó	Action thriller	
6:3 Play It Again Tutti	Péter Tímár			Entered into the 21st Moscow International Film Festival
A Monkey's Tale	Jean-François Laguionie	Tara Römer (voice), Nadia Farès (voice), Pierre Arditi (voice), Jean Piat (voice), Yves Barsacq (voice)	Animated	
Egérút	Béla Ternovszky	Gábor Mádi Szabó (voice), Béla Paudits (voice), Éva Schubert (voice), Gábor Vass (voice)	2D Computer-animated	

== 2000s ==
Title	Director	Cast	Genre	Notes
2000
A négy évszak	Ferenc Cakó		Animation	
Anyád! A Szúnyogok	Miklós Jancsó	Zoltán Mucsi, Péter Scherer, József Szarvas	Drama, satire	
Üvegtigris	Péter Rudolf, Iván Kapitány	Péter Rudolf, Gábor Reviczky, Imre Csuja	Comedy	
Jadviga párnája	Krisztina Deák	Ildikó Tóth, Viktor Bodó		
Our Love	József Pacskovszky			Entered into the 22nd Moscow International Film Festival
Rosszfiúk	Tamás Sas	Viktor Bodó, Gábor Máté		
Werckmeister harmóniák	Béla Tarr	Lars Rudolph, Peter Fitz, Hanna Schygulla	Drama	
Nincsen nekem vágyam semmi	Kornél Mundruczó	Ervin Nagy, Roland Rába, Martina Kovács	Drama	
Portugál	Andor Lukáts	Imre Csuja, Réka Pelsöczy, Ági Szirtes	Comedy drama	
A Holocaust szemei	János Szász	Kati Sabella, Rezsõné Bartha, Júlia Buda	Documentary history	
A kis utazás	Mihály Buzás, György Pálos	Arnold Farkas, József Szikra, Imola Gáspár	Comedy drama romance	
Film...	András Surányi	Hédi Temessy, Iván Darvas, Juli Básti	Drama	
2001
Blind Guys	Péter Tímár			Entered into the 23rd Moscow International Film Festival
Moszkva tér	Ferenc Török	Gábor Karalyos, Erzsi Pápai, Eszter Balla	Comedy	
Csocsó, avagy Éljen május elseje!	Róbert Koltai	Róbert Koltai, András Kern, András Stohl	Comedy	
Hamvadó cigarettavég	Péter Bacsó	Eszter Nagy-Kálózy, Péter Rudolf, György Cserhalmi		
Paszport	Péter Gothár			
Utolsó vacsora az Arabs Szürkénél	Miklós Jancsó	Zoltán Mucsi, Péter Scherer		
2002
Valami Amerika	Herendi Gábor	Tibor Szervét, Csaba Pindroch, Győző Szabó	Comedy	
Song of the Miraculous Hind	Marcell Jankovics		Animated mythological and historical	
Hukkle	György Pálfi	Ferenc Bandi, Józsefné Rácz, József Farkas	Drama	
A Hídember; The Bridgeman	Géza Bereményi	Károly Eperjes, Irina Latchina, Iván Darvas, György Cserhalmi	Drama film	
The Princess and the Pea	Mark Swan	Amanda Waring (voice), Jonathan Firth (voice), Dan Finnerty (voice), Steven Webb (voice), Nigel Lambert (voice), Lincoln Hoppe (voice), Ronan Vibert (voice), Eve Karpf (voice), Liz May Brice (voice), Richard Ridings (voice), Patsy Rowlands (voice)	Animated musical fantasy	
Max	Menno Meyjes	John Cusack, Noah Taylor, Leelee Sobieski, Molly Parker	drama	
Felhő a Gangesz felett	György Dobray	Zoltán Ternyák, Ildikó Tóth		
Thornberry család - A mozifilm	Jeff McGrath, Cathy Malkasian	Lacey Chabert, Tom Kane, Danielle Harris, Jodi Carlisle, Tim Curry, Lynn Redgrave, Rupert Everett, Marisa Tomei, Flea	Animated adventure	
2003
A Long Weekend in Pest and Buda	Károly Makk			Entered into the 25th Moscow International Film Festival
Kontroll	Nimród Antal	Sándor Csányi, Zoltán Mucsi	Comedy, drama	Screened at the 2004 Cannes Film Festival
Magyar vándor	Herendi Gábor	TiborSzervét, János Gyuriska, János Greifenstein	Comedy	
Libiomfi	Zoltán Kálmánchelyi	Zoltán Mucsi, Gábor Dióssi, Zsolt Végh		
Tesó	Zsombor Dyga	Gábor Welker, Zoltán Schmied		
A boldogság színe	József Pacskovszky	Anna Györgyi, Erik Desfosses, Sándor Szakácsi	Drama	
Underworld	Len Wiseman	Kate Beckinsale, Scott Speedman, Michael Sheen, Shane Brolly, Erwin Leder, Bill Nighy	action horror	
2004
Másnap	Attila Janisch	Tibor Gáspár	Crime drama	
Magyar vándor	Gábor Herendi	Károly Gesztesi, János Gyuriska	Adventure comedy	
Mix	Steven Lovy	János Kulka, Alex Weed, Dorka Gryllus		
Rap, Revü, Rómeó	Oláh J. Gábor	János Gálvölgyi, András Stohl, Eszter Ónodi	Comedy, maffia	
Európából Európába	Ildikó Enyedi, Benedek Fliegauf, Miklós Jancsó, Zsolt Kézdi-Kovács, Elemér Ragályi, János Rózsa, István Szabó, Pál Sándor, Sándor Sára, Ferenc Török	Ildikó Enyedi, Dezsö Garas, Zoltán Gulyás Kiss	Documentary short	
Csodálatos Júlia	István Szabó	Annette Bening, Jeremy Irons, Shaun Evans	comedy-drama	
A temetetlen halott	Márta Mészáros	Jan Nowicki, Lili Horváth		
Szezon	Ferenc Török	Zsolt Nagy, Ervin Nagy, Péter Kokics		
Csoda Krakkóban	Dianna Groó	Maciej Adamczyk, Franciszek Pieczka, Pawel Gedlek		
Nyócker!	Áron Gauder, Erik Novák		Animation	Won Best Animated Feature Film at the 7th Kecskeméti Animációs Filmfesztivál
2005
Rokonok	István Szabó	Sándor Csányi, Ildikó Tóth, Károly Eperjes	Drama	Entered into the 28th Moscow International Film Festival
Dallas Pashamende	Robert-Adrian Pejo	Zsolt Bogdán, Dorka Gryllus		
Fekete kefe	Roland Vranik	Gergely Bánki, Károly Hajduk, Csaba Hernádi		
A halál kilovagolt Perzsiából	Putyi Horváth	László Melis, Zoltán Schneider		
A porcelánbaba	Gárdos Péter	Csányi Sándor, Németh Judit	Drama	Entered into the 27th Moscow International Film Festival
Ég veled!	József Pacskovszy	Natalia Szeliversztova, Dmitrij Pavlenko		
A fény ösvényei	Attila Mispál	Annamária Cseh, György Cserhalmi, Mari Törőcsik		
Sorstalanság	Lajos Koltai	Marcell Nagy, Péter Haumann, Péter Harkányi	Drama	
Maestro	Géza M. Tóth		Computer-animated short	
Johanna	Kornél Mundruczó	Orsolya Tóth	Musical	Screened at the 2005 Cannes Film Festival
2006
Szabadság, szerelem	Krisztina Goda	Iván Fenyő, Kata Dobó, Sándor Csányi, Viktória Szávai, Károly Gesztesi, Péter Haumann	Romance, drama, historical	
A harag napja	Adrian Rudomin	Christopher Lambert, Brian Blessed, Szonja Oroszlán	Action, thriller, drama	
A herceg haladéka	Péter Tímár	Gabi Szabó, Tibor Gáspár		
De kik azok a Lumnitzer nővérek?	Péter Bacsó	Róbert Alföldi, Péter Rudolf, Barbara Hegyi		
Fehér tenyér	Szabolcs Hajdu	Miklós Zoltán Hajdu, Kyle Shewfelt		
Mansfeld	Andor Szilágyi	Péter Fancsikai, Maia Morgenstern		
Taxidermia	György Pálfi	Gergő Trócsányi	Horror	Screened at the 2006 Cannes Film Festival
Egyetleneim	Gyula Nemes	Krisztián Kovács, Orsolya Tóth		
Vadászat angolokra	Bertalan Bagó	György Cserhalmi		
2007
Fészekrakók	Balázs Dobóczi	György Mihály, Réka Bolváry Mihályné	Documentary	
La Reine Soleil	Philippe Leclerc de Hauteclocque	Coralie Vanderlinden, David Scarpuzza, Arnaud Léonard	Animated	
Megy a gőzös	Róbert Koltai	Róbert Koltai, Judit Pogány, Tamás Szabó, Katinka Egres, Károly Gesztesi	Comedy	
Lora	Gábor Herendi	Lucia Brawley, Péter Nagy, Ernő Fekete	Romance, drama	
Adjátok vissza a hegyeimet	Gábor Koltay	Károly Rékasi		
Egon & Dönci	Ádám Magyar		Animation	First freely downloadable computer animated 3D feature-film
Iszka utazása	Csaba Bollók	Mária Varga, Marian Ursache		
A Nap utcai fiúk	György Szomjas	Kata Gáspár, Péter Bárnai		
Ópium – Egy elmebeteg nő naplója	János Szász	Ulrich Thomsen, Kirsti Stuboe		Entered into the 29th Moscow International Film Festival
Töredék	Gyula Maár	Annamária Cseh, Mari Törőcsik		
A londoni férfi	Béla Tarr	Miroslav Krobot, Miroslav Krobot	Film noir, crime film, art film	Entered into the 2007 Cannes Film Festival
Macskafogó 2 - A sátán macskája	Béla Ternovszky	László Sinkó, Péter Rudolf, Miklós Benedek, Péter Haumann, György Dörner, Béla Stenczer, Péter Balázs, Mátyás Usztics, Gábor Reviczky, Iván Darvas, Ilona Béres, András Kern, Zsuzsa Pálos, Gyula Szombathy, Gyula Bodrogi, István Mikó, Károly Mécs, László Szacsvay	Animated comedy-fantasy	
2008
A Fox's Tale	György Gát, János Uzsák	Freddie Highmore, Miranda Richardson, Bill Nighy, Sienna Miller, Clemency Burton-Hill, Matthew McNulty	animated	
A nyomozó	Attila Gigor	Zsolt Anger		
Eszter hagyatéka	József Sipos	Eszter Nagy-Kálózy, Cserhalmi György, Mari Törőcsik, Károly Eperjes		
The Secret of Moonacre	Gábor Csupó	Ioan Gruffudd, Tim Curry, Natascha McElhone, Juliet Stevenson, Dakota Blue Richards	fantasy	
Kaméleon	Krisztina Goda	Ervin Nagy, Gabriella Hámori		
Virtually a Virgin	Péter Bacsó			Entered into the 30th Moscow International Film Festival
Immigrants - Jóska menni Amerika	Gábor Csupó	Hank Azaria, Eric McCormack	Animated comedy	
2009
A belgrádi fantom	Jovan Todorović	Milutin Milošević, Radoslav Milenković, Marko Živić, Nada Macanković	Historical drama thriller documentary	
Álom.net	Gábor Forgács	Lilla Labanc, Kinga Czifra, Ádám Csernóczki	Romantic comedy	
1	Pater Sparrow	Zoltán Kamondi		
Besa - Az adott szó	Srđan Karanović		drama	

== 2010s ==
Title	Director	Cast	Genre	Notes
2010
Bibliothèque Pascal	Szabolcs Hajdu			
Pál Adrienn	Ágnes Kocsis	Éva Gábor, István Znamenák, Ákos Horváth, Lia Pokorny, Izabella Hegyi	Drama	It was screened in the Un Certain Regard section at the 2010 Cannes Film Festival
East Side Stories	Márk Bodzsár, Csaba Bollók, Szabolcs Hajdu, Ferenc Török			
Bogyó és Babóca - 13 mese	Antonin Krizanics, Géza M. Tóth	Becca Laidler, Judit Pogány	2D animation	
2011
The Enemy	Dejan Zečević	Aleksandar Stojković, Vuk Kostić, Tihomir Stanić, Ljubomir Bandović	Drama horror thriller	
Adventure				
The Maiden Danced to Death	Endre Hules			
The Turin Horse	Béla Tarr			
Bogyó és Babóca 2. - 13 új mese	Antonin Krizanics, Géza M. Tóth	Becca Laidler, Judit Pogány	2D animation	
Az ember tragédiája	Marcell Jankovics	Tibor Szilágyi (voice), Mátyás Usztics (voice), Ágnes Bertalan (voice), Tamás Széles (voice), Piroska Molnár (voice)	Animated drama	
The Nutcracker in 3D	Andrei Konchalovsky	Elle Fanning, Nathan Lane, John Turturro, Charlie Rowe, Shirley Henderson, Frances de la Tour, Richard E. Grant, Yulia Vysotskaya, Aaron Michael Drozin	Christmas musical fantasy	
2012
Just the Wind	Benedek Fliegauf			Won the Jury Grand Prix on the 62nd Berlin International Film Festival
The Door	István Szabó	Helen Mirren		
Ciklus	Zoltán Sóstai	Mike Kelly, Mark C. Phelan, Márk Györgyfalvay	CG animation	
2013
The Notebook	János Szász			
2014
Symphony No. 42	Réka Bucsi		Animated short	
Land of Storms (Viharsarok)	Ádám Császi	András Sütö, Ádám Varga, Sebastian Urzendowsky		
White God	Kornél Mundruczó	Zsófia Psotta, Sándor Zsótér, Lili Horváth,	Drama	
Manieggs: Egy kemény tojás bosszúja	Zoltán Miklósy	Titanilla Bogdányi, Zoltán Boros, Imre Csuja	Animation action comedy	
Bogyó és Babóca 3. - Játszótársak	Antonin Krizanics, Géza M. Tóth	Becca Laidler, Judit Pogány	Animation family	
2015
Liza, the Fox-Fairy	Károly Ujj Mészáros	Monika Balsai, Szabolcs Bede-Fazekas, David Sakurai		
Son of Saul	László Nemes	Géza Röhrig, Levente Molnár	Drama	Won the award for Best Foreign Language Film at the 88th Academy Awards, also won the Grand Prix at the 2015 Cannes Film Festival and the Golden Globe for Best Foreign Language Film
2016
Superbia	Luca Tóth		Animated short	
A martfűi rém	Árpád Sopsits	Károly Hajduk, Mónika Balsai, Péter Bárnai, Zsolt Anger, Zsolt Trill, Gábor Jászberényi, Zsófia Szamosi	Neo-noir crime	
2017
On Body and Soul	Ildikó Enyedi	Géza Morcsányi, Alexandra Borbély		Entered into the 90th Academy Awards
1945	Ferenc Török	Péter Rudolf, Bence Tasnádi, Tamás Szabó Kimmel	Drama	
Kojot	Márk Kostyál	András Mészáros, Mária Dobra, László Mátray	Action drama	
Lengemesék	Zsolt Pálfi	András Faragó, Anna Kubik, Tamás Markovics	Animated adventure fantasy family	
Jupiter holdja	Kornél Mundruczó	Merab Ninidze	drama	
Egy kupac kufli	Kristóf Jurik, Szabolcs Pálfi, Géza M. Tóth	Péter Scherer	Animation family	
Salamon király kalandjai	Albert Hanan Kaminski	Ori Pfeffer, Hana Laslo, Ori Laizerouvich	Animation family history	
A Viszkis	Nimród Antal	Bence Szalay	Action	
2018
Sunset	László Nemes	Juli Jakab, Vlad Ivanov, Marcin Czarnik, Evelin Dobos, Judit Bárdos		Entered into the 91st Academy Awards
Another Day of Life	Raul de la Fuente, Damian Nenow	Artur Queiroz, Luis Alberto Ferreira, Carlota Machado, Joaquim António Lopes Farrusco, Miroslaw Haniszewski, Vergil J. Smith, Tomasz Zietek, Olga Boladz, Rafal Fudalej, Pawel Paczesny, Jakub Kamienski, Kerry Shale, Daniel Flynn, Youssef Kerkour, Lillie Flynn, Akie Kotabe, Ben Elliot, Emma Tate	Animated	
Ruben Brandt, a gyűjtő	Milorad Krstić	Iván Kamarás (voice), Csaba "Kor" Márton (voice), Gabriella Hámori (voice), Matt Devere (voice), Henry Grant (voice), Christian Nielson Buckholdt (voice), Katalin Dombi (voice), Paul Bellantoni (voice), Geoffrey Thomas (voice)	Animated crime thriller	
Lengemesék 2 - Tél a Nádtengeren	Zsólt Pálfi	András Faragó, Anna Kubik, Tamás Markovics	Animation family	
2019
Those Who Remained	Barnabás Tóth	Károly Hajduk, Abigél Szõke	Drama	Entered into the 92nd Academy Awards
A Pásztor	László Illés	Miklós Székely B., Ákos Horváth, Tamás Jordán	Drama	
Mi újság kuflik?	Kristóf Jurik, Géza M. Tóth	Péter Scherer	Animation family	
Boxi a Film	Béla Klingl, Áron Gauder, Péter Horog, Árpád Koós, József Sándor		Adventure	

== 2020s ==
Title	Director	Cast	Genre	Notes
2020
Zárójelentés	István Szabó	Klaus Maria Brandauer, Károly Eperjes, Dorottya Udvaros	Drama	
Bogyó és Babóca 4 - Tündérkártyák	Antonin Krizanics, Géza M. Tóth	Becca Laidler, Judit Pogány	Animation	
Preparations to Be Together for an Unknown Period of Time (Felkészülés meghatározatlan ideig tartó együttlétre)	Lili Horvát	Natasa Stork, Viktor Bodó	Drama	
Magic Arch 3D	Vasiliy Rovenskiy	Stephen Thomas Ochsner, Daniil Medvedev, Liza Klimova	Animation family fantasy	
Post Mortem	Péter Bergendy	Viktor Klem	Horror	
A pozsonyi csata	Tamás Baltavári	Paul Mackie, Károly Rékasi	Animation fantasy history	
2021
Családi legendák	Katalin Glaser		Animation	
Natural Light	Dénes Nagy		Drama	
Kuflik és az Akármi	Kristóf Jurik	Péter Scherer	Animation	
2022
Legendárium - Mesék Székelyföldről	Szabolcs Fazakas		Animation	
The Munsters	Rob Zombie	Sheri Moon Zombie, Jeff Daniel Phillips, Daniel Roebuck, Richard Brake, Jorge Garcia, Sylvester McCoy, Catherine Schell, Cassandra Peterson	Horror comedy	
Toldi, a mozifilm	Marcell Jankovics, Lajos Csákovics	Tamás Széles	Animation adventure comedy	
Big Trip 2: Special Delivery	Vasily Rovensky, Natalya Nilova	Daniil Medvedev, Bernard Jacobsen, Stephen Thomas Ochsner	Animation adventure comedy	
2023
Infinity Pool	Brandon Cronenberg	Alexander Skarsgård, Mia Goth, Cleopatra Coleman	science fiction horror	
2024
John Vardar vs the Galaxy	Goce Cvetanovski	Žarko Dimoski, Damjan Cvetanovski, Emilija Micevska, Filip Trajković, Toni Denkovski, Atanas Atanasovski, Sladjana Vujošević, Martin Gjorgoski, Elena Tarčugovska, Bojana Toskovska	Animated space opera comedy	First animated film produced in North Macedonia
2026
Káoszigény	Márk Tóth		thriller, drama	Slovak–Hungarian co-production; English title Chaos Exigency; Hungarian language
