= Frigyes Hollósi (actor) =

Hungarian actor

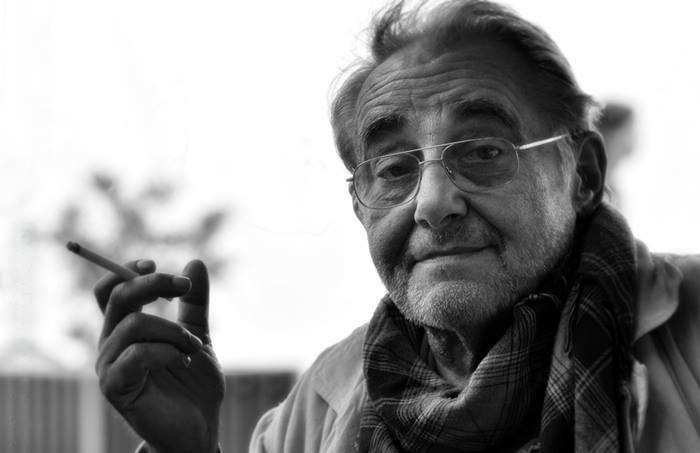
Frigyes Hollósi

Frigyes Hollósi (21 April 1941 – 5 December 2012) was a Hungarian actor. He was born in Budapest, as Frigyes Weininger.

== Partial filmography ==
- The Vulture (1982)
- Night Rehearsal (1983)
- Tight Quarters (1983)
- Love, Mother (1987)
- Paths of Death and Angels (1991)
- We Never Die (1993)
- Sunshine (1999)
