= List of submissions to the 63rd Academy Awards for Best Foreign Language Film =

1990 Best Foreign Language Film submissions

Highlights
- Oscar winner: (Switzerland) Journey of Hope
- Submissions: 37
- Debuts: 2

Ceremony poster for the 63rd Academy Awards

This is a list of submissions to the 63rd Academy Awards for Best Foreign Language Film. The Academy Award for Best Foreign Language Film was created in 1956 by the Academy of Motion Picture Arts and Sciences to honour non-English-speaking films produced outside the United States. The award is handed out annually, and is accepted by the winning film's director, although it is considered an award for the submitting country as a whole. Countries are invited by the Academy to submit their best films for competition according to strict rules, with only one film being accepted from each country.

For the 63rd Academy Awards, thirty-seven films were submitted in the category Academy Award for Best Foreign Language Film. The five nominated films came from China, France, Germany, Italy and Switzerland. Chile submitted a film for the first time. While Germany submitted for the first time after its reunification, previously submitting as East Germany and West Germany.

Switzerland won for the second time with Journey of Hope by Xavier Koller.

== Submissions ==
Submitting country	Film title used in nomination	Original title	Language(s)	Director(s)	Result
Argentina	I, the Worst of All	Yo, la peor de todas	Spanish	María Luisa Bemberg	Not nominated
Austria	Requiem for Dominic	Requiem für Dominik	German	Robert Dornhelm	Not nominated
Bulgaria	Margarit and Margarita	Маргарит и Маргарита	Bulgarian	Nikolai Volev	Not nominated
Canada	An Imaginary Tale	Une histoire inventée	French	André Forcier	Not nominated
Chile	The Moon in the Mirror	La Luna en el espejo	Spanish	Silvio Caiozzi	Not nominated
China	Ju Dou	菊豆	Mandarin	Zhang Yimou, Yang Fengliang	Nominated
Cuba	The Beauty of the Alhambra	La bella del Alhambra	Spanish	Enrique Pineda Barnet	Not nominated
Czechoslovakia	Vojtech, Called the Orphan	Vojtěch, řečený sirotek	Czech	Zdeněk Tyc	Not nominated
Denmark	Dance of the Polar Bears	Lad isbjørnene danse	Danish	Birger Larsen	Not nominated
Egypt	Alexandria Again and Forever	إسكندرية كمان وكمان	Egyptian Arabic	Youssef Chahine	Not nominated
Finland	The Winter War	Talvisota	Finnish	Pekka Parikka	Not nominated
France	Cyrano de Bergerac		French	Jean-Paul Rappeneau	Nominated
Germany	The Nasty Girl	Das schreckliche Mädchen	German	Michael Verhoeven	Nominated
Greece	Love Under the Date-Tree	Έρωτας στη χουρμαδιά	Greek	Stavros Tsiolis	Not nominated
Hong Kong	Eight Taels of Gold	八兩金	Cantonese	Mabel Cheung	Not nominated
Hungary	Little but Tough	Kicsi, de nagyon erös	Hungarian	Ferenc Grunwalsky	Not nominated
Iceland	The Adventures of Paper Peter	Ævintýri Pappírs Pésa	Icelandic	Ari Kristinsson	Not nominated
India	Anjali	அஞ்சலி	Tamil	Mani Ratnam	Not nominated
Indonesia	My Sky, My Home	Langitku rumahku	Indonesian	Slamet Rahardjo	Not nominated
Israel	The Lookout	שורו	Hebrew	Savi Gabizon	Not nominated
Italy	Open Doors	Porte aperte	Italian	Gianni Amelio	Nominated
Japan	The Sting of Death	死の棘	Japanese	Kōhei Oguri	Not nominated
Mexico	Cabeza de Vaca		Spanish, Latin	Nicolás Echevarría	Not nominated
Netherlands	Evenings	De Avonden	Dutch	Rudolf van den Berg	Not nominated
Norway	Herman		Norwegian	Erik Gustavson	Not nominated
Peru	Fallen from Heaven	Caídos del cielo	Spanish	Francisco José Lombardi	Not nominated
Poland	Korczak		Polish	Andrzej Wajda	Not nominated
Portugal	The King's Trial	O Processo do Rei	Portuguese	João Mário Grilo	Not nominated
Romania	Carnival Scenes	De ce trag clopotele, Mitică?	Romanian	Lucian Pintilie	Not nominated
South Korea	Mayumi	마유미	Korean	Shin Sang-ok	Not nominated
Soviet Union	Taxi Blues	Такси-блюз	Russian	Pavel Lungin	Not nominated
Spain	¡Ay Carmela!		Spanish	Carlos Saura	Not nominated
Sweden	Good Evening, Mr. Wallenberg	God afton, Herr Wallenberg	Swedish	Kjell Grede	Not nominated
Switzerland	Journey of Hope	Reise der Hoffnung, Umuda Yolculuk	Turkish, Swiss German, Italian	Xavier Koller	Won Academy Award
Taiwan	Song of the Exile	客途秋恨	Cantonese, Japanese, Mandarin, English	Ann Hui	Not nominated
Thailand	Song for Chao Phraya	น้องเมีย	Thai	Chatrichalerm Yukol	Not nominated
Yugoslavia	Time of Miracles	Време чуда	Serbo-Croatian	Goran Paskaljević	Not nominated

== Notes ==
- Ju Dou became the first Chinese film to be nominated for an Oscar, despite China's flip-flop over whether it even wanted the film in the competition. The film was officially selected by China's national film board, which later unsuccessfully tried to persuade the Academy to withdraw the film.
- The 1981 Romanian film Carnival Scenes had been banned in Romania and was not released in local theatres. Since the film had never been released, the Academy initially accepted it as a new film. However, while the film was listed on AMPAS' Fall 1991 press release, it was not listed in a 2007 updated list. It is unknown whether the film actually screened or was disqualified.
