= Mother! The Mosquitoes =

- Directed by: Miklós Jancsó
- Starring: Zoltán Mucsi; Péter Scherer
- Release date: 10 February 2000
- Running time: 80 minutes
- Country: Hungary
- Language: Hungarian

Mother! The Mosquitoes (Hungarian: Anyád! A szúnyogok), also known in English as Damn you! Mosquito, is a 2000 Hungarian comedy film directed by Miklós Jancsó.

== Cast ==
- Zoltán Mucsi as Kapa
- Péter Scherer as Pepe
- Emese Vasvári as Emese

== Reception ==
A review in Variety explains: "Non-Hungarians won’t get a lot out of this seemingly improvised foolery, or out of the significant use of traditional and popular songs. But the freshness with which the venerable director handles this contemporary material certainly impresses. Jancso appears before the camera in the final sequence, looking serene and contemplative as he directs the last shot of the film."
