= The Adventures of Paper Peter =

1990 film

- Directed by: Ari Kristinsson
- Written by: Ari Kristinsson
- Starring: Högni Snaer Hauksson
- Release date: 1 September 1990
- Running time: 81 minutes
- Country: Iceland
- Language: Icelandic

The Adventures of Paper Peter (Icelandic: Ævintýri Pappírs Pésa) is a 1990 Icelandic drama film directed by Ari Kristinsson. The film was selected as the Icelandic entry for the Best Foreign Language Film at the 63rd Academy Awards, but was not accepted as a nominee.

== Cast ==
- Högni Snaer Hauksson
- Ingólfur Gudvarðarson
- Kristmann Óskarsson
- Magnús Ólafsson
- Rajeev Murukesevan
- Rannveig Jónsdóttir

== See also ==
- List of submissions to the 63rd Academy Awards for Best Foreign Language Film
- List of Icelandic submissions for the Academy Award for Best Foreign Language Film
