= Péter Scherer =

Hungarian actor (1961–2026)

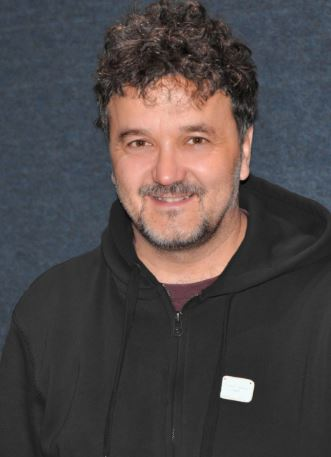
- Born: 16 November 1961; Ajka, Hungary
- Died: 19 May 2026 (aged 64); Spain
- Occupation: Actor
- Years active: 1996–2026
- Spouse: Viktória Bencze (m. 1995)
- Children: 3
- Parent(s): József Scherer; Zsuzsanna Jány
- Awards: Jászai Mari Award
- Website: www.imdb.com/name/nm0771035/

Péter Scherer (16 November 1961 – 19 May 2026) was a Hungarian stage and film actor.

== Life and career ==
Scherer was born in Ajka, Hungary, on 16 November 1961. After finishing his secondary school in Szombathely, he graduated from Budapest University of Technology and Economics in 1987. First he became a member of the Arvisura Theatre Company (between 1984 and 1994). From 1995 he was freelance actor. Later he joined the Bárka Theatre in 1997.

From 2002 he was a member of the Krétakör Theater. His famous movie role was in Miklós Jancsó’s The Lord's Lantern in Budapest (1999) as Pepe. He also appeared in such films as Kontroll (2003), One day in Europe (2005), Doll No. 639 (2005), and Carlos (2010).

He received the Jászai Mari Award in 2009.

Scherer died on 19 May 2026, at the age of 64.

== Theatre roles ==
- William Shakespeare: A Midsummer Night's Dream....Demetrius; Orrondi; Ormándi Béla – Mustármag
- Merle: Madrapur....
- Sophocles: Oidipusz....
- William Shakespeare: Hamlet....Claudius
- István Tasnádi: Bábelna....Hornyák Dávid
- William Shakespeare: Macbeth....McDuff; Banquo
- García Lorca: Don Cristobal....Figaro
- Büchner: Woyzeck....Captain
- John Webster: The Duchess of Malfi
- Glowaczki: Antigone in New York....Policeman
- Csehov: The Seagull....Samrajev
- Molière: Mizantrope....Oronte
- Ödön von Horváth: Kasimir és Karoline....Lilliputi; Doctor
- Vladimir Szorokin: The Ice....Autodriver
- Kai Hensel: Klamm's war....Klamm
- Crimp: a.N.N.a (Attempts On Her Life)

== Filmography ==
Year	Title	Role	Notes
1999	The Lord's Lantern in Budapest	Pepe	(Movie film), director: Miklós Jancsó
2000	Kisváros	Guests included	(TV series), 3 episodes
2000	Anyád! A szúnyogok	Pepe	(Movie film), director: Miklós Jancsó
2000	uristen@menny.hu	St. Peter	(short)
2001	Last Supper at the Arabian Gray Horse	Pepe	(Movie film), director: Miklós Jancsó
2002	Wake Up, Mate, Don't You Sleep	Pepe	(Movie film), director: Miklós Jancsó
2003	Kontroll	Chief	(Movie film), director: Nimród Antal
2004	A mohácsi vész	Pepe	(Movie film), director: Miklós Jancsó
2004	Argo	Bodri	(Movie film), director: Attila Árpa
2005	One Day in Europe	Gabor	(Movie film), director: Hannes Stöhr
2005	Doll No. 639	Man	Black Tulip Award for Best Short Film (András Dési); Grand Prize of European Fantasy Short Film in Silver; Best Narrative Short
2006	Ede megevé ebédem	Pepe	(Movie film), director: Miklós Jancsó
2010	So Much for Justice!	Pepe	(Movie film), director: Miklós Jancsó
2010	Szinglik éjszakája	Taxis	(Movie film), director: Tamás Sas
2010	Carlos	Agent hongrois #1	(TV mini-series), Episode #1.3
2011	The Exam	Emil Kulcsár	(Movie film), director: Péter Bergendy
2015	Az éjszakám a nappalod	Pocak	(Movie film), director: Gábor Móray
2015–15	Kossuthkifli	Jeromos Görbekerti	(TV mini-series), supporting role
2015	Fever at Dawn	Kronheim	(Movie film), director: Péter Gárdos
2015–18	Válótársak	Dávid Jakab	(TV series), lead role
2017	Kincsem	Berger	(Movie film), director: Gábor Herendi
2018	Trezor	Kálmán Honti	(Movie film), director: Péter Bergendy
2020–23	Apatigris	Péter	(TV series), lead role
2021	A játszma (The Exam 2)	Emil Kulcsár	(Movie film), director: Péter Fazekas
