= Erzsi Pásztor =

Hungarian actress

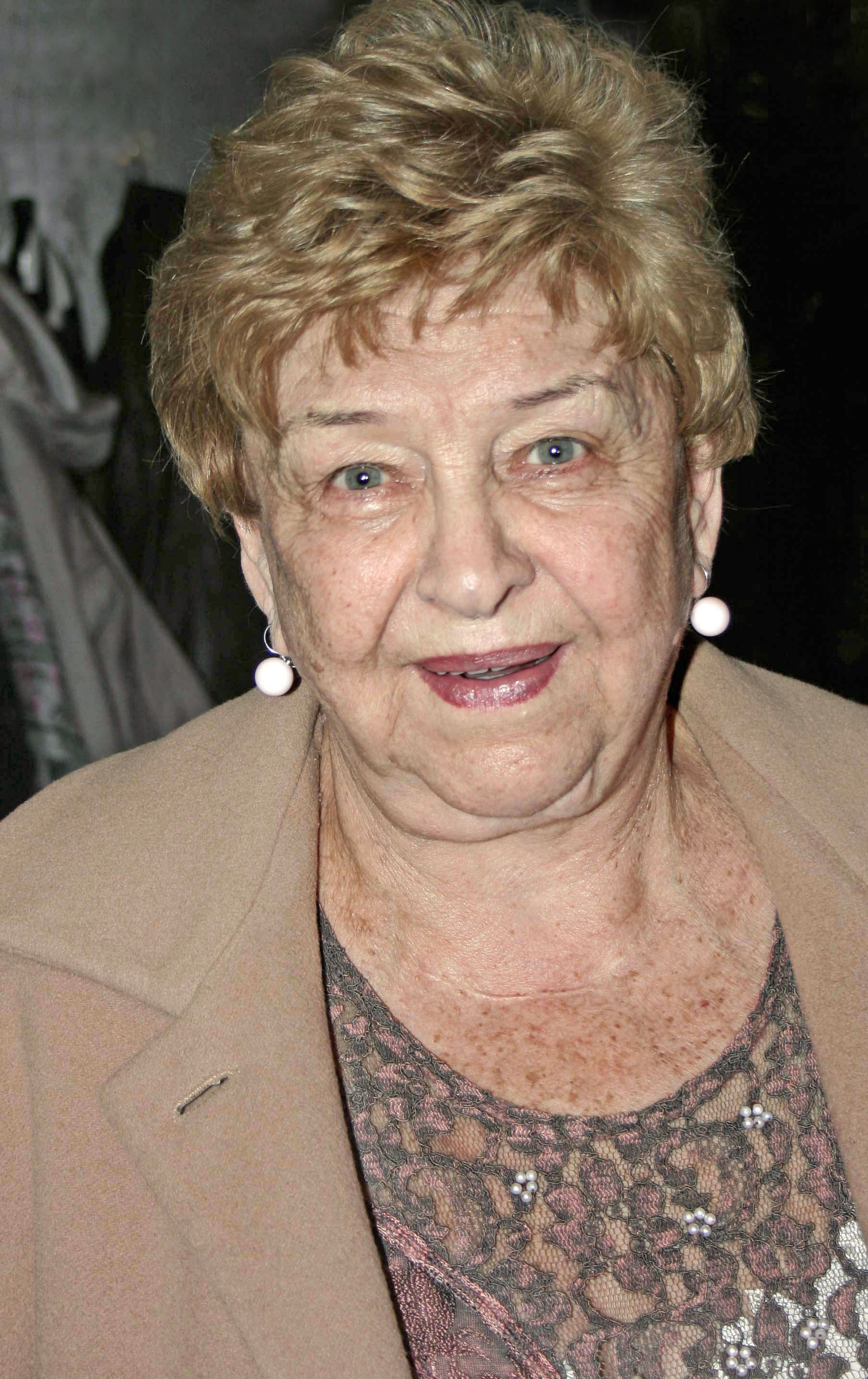
- Pásztor in 2013
- Born: Erzsébet Pápay; 24 September 1936 (age 90); Budapest, Hungary
- Occupation: Actress
- Years active: 1959–present

Erzsi Pásztor (born Erzsébet Pápay; 24 September 1936) is a Hungarian actress. She appeared in more than one hundred films since 1959.

== Selected filmography ==
Year	Title	Role	Notes
1977	Rain and Shine		
1978	A ménesgazda		
1979	Angi Vera		
1992	Sweet Emma, Dear Böbe		
2001	An American Rhapsody		
