= The King's Trial =

- Directed by: João Mário Grilo
- Written by: João Mário Grilo
- Starring: Carlos Daniel
- Release date: 19 January 1990
- Running time: 91 minutes
- Country: Portugal
- Language: Portuguese

The King's Trial (Portuguese: O Processo do Rei) is a 1990 Portuguese drama film directed by João Mário Grilo. The film was selected as the Portuguese entry for the Best Foreign Language Film at the 63rd Academy Awards, but was not accepted as a nominee.

== Cast ==
- Carlos Daniel as D. Afonso VI
- Aurelle Doazan as D. Maria Francisca de Saboia
- Antonino Solmer as D. Pedro, Infante de Portugal
- Carlos Martins Medeiros as Count of Castelo-Melhor
- Gérard Hardy as Preyssac, Enviado de Luis XIV
- Muriel Brenner as Ninon

== See also ==
- List of submissions to the 63rd Academy Awards for Best Foreign Language Film
- List of Portuguese submissions for the Academy Award for Best Foreign Language Film
