= Anikó Für =

Hungarian actress

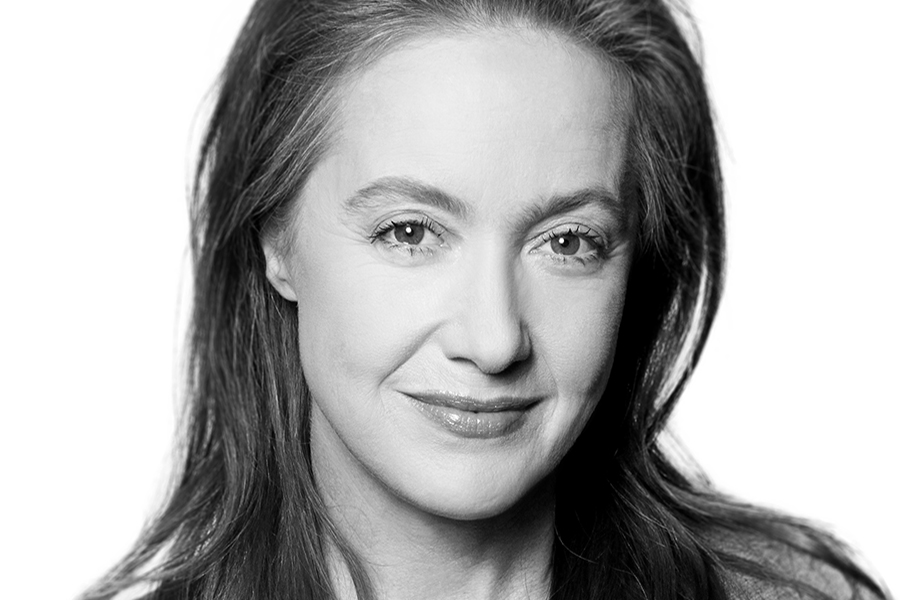
- Für in 2016
- Born: 27 February 1964 (age 62); Budapest, Hungary
- Occupation: Actress
- Years active: 1988–present

Anikó Für (born 27 February 1964) is a Hungarian actress. She has had a lengthy career on stage in classic and contemporary roles, and also performs on television and in film, including 1991's Paths of Death and Angels.

She is also a voice actor, dubbing the Hungarian versions of English-language films. She is the regular Hungarian voice of many American actresses, mostly of Cameron Diaz and Sandra Bullock.

== Personal life ==
She has been married twice the second time in 2015.
