= Berry and Dolly =

- Bogyó és Babóca
- Directed by: Géza M. Tóth; Antonin Krizsanics
- Narrated by: Judit Pogány
- Original language: Hungarian
- No. of seasons: 4

Production
- Producers: Géza M. Tóth; György Péchy
- Production company: KEDD Stúdió

Berry and Dolly (Hungarian: Bogyó és Babóca, pronounced [ˈboɟoː eːʃ ˈbɒboːtsɒ]) is a Hungarian animated series for children based on the book series of the same name by Bartos Erika. All four current series are produced and directed by Géza M. Tóth through the KEDD Stúdió animation studio.

The series consists of five-minute episodes and each individual series is released as a compiled film. In 2010, the first film became the third most watched film in Hungary. The series has been translated into English, Slovenian, Serbian, Romanian, Lithuanian, and Czech. It has enjoyed success through its televisation on the channel Minimax.

== Characters ==
- Berry: A male snail.
- Dolly: A female ladybug.
- Sam: A water snail.
- Leapy: A female grasshopper.
- Balthazar: A bee.
- Rosita: A female rose beetle.
- Stan: A male stag beetle.
- Flutter: A female butterfly.
- Eddy: A male potato beetle.

== Recognition and awards ==
In 2011, the KEDD animation studio won the Best Short Film award at the Jiangyin 11th International Children's Film Festival for the episode Alfonzo's Fiddle (Hungarian: Tücsök hegedűje).

In 2012, Berry and Dolly was shown at the Tokyo International Anime Fair.

In 2013, the film won a "Cartoon Kids" award at the Cartoon Club Animation festival in Italy.

In 2013, the film also won the audience choice award at the Kecskemét animation film festival.

In 2017, the film won the judges' choice award at the 6th international animation festival in Xi'an, China.

Berry and Dolly has also been a part of other film festivals such as the Zlín Film Festival, the Basauri-Bizkaia International Animated Film Festival, and AniFest ROZAFA.

== Episodes ==
=== Series 1 ===
This series was released as the film Berry and Dolly - Friends (original title: Bogyó és Babóca - Barátok) in 2010.

Episode	Title	Original title
1	Friends	A barátság
2	Earache	A fülgyulladás
3	The Rainbow	A szivárvány
4	The Kite	A papírsárkány
5	Santa	Télapó
6	The Big Spider	A barlangi pók
7	Christmas	Karácsony
8	Witches	Boszorkányok
9	Kindergarten	Egy nap az óvodában
10	The Little Bumblebee	Dongólány
11	The Snowman	Hóember
12	Sea Adventure	Tengeri kaland
13	Alfonzo's Fiddle	Tücsök hegedűje

=== Series 2 ===
This series was released as the film Berry and Dolly - Gingerbread (original title: Bogyó és Babóca 2. - Mézeskalács) in 2011.

Episode	Title	Original title
1	The Yellow Ladybird	A sárga katica
2	The Water Snail	A vízicsiga
3	The Missing Nuts	Az elveszett mogyoró
4	Stanley Skates	Vendel korcsolyázik
5	Harry Hedgehog's Birthday	Sün Soma születésnapja
6	The Bicycle	A bicikli
7	The Carnival	Jelmezbál
8	Spring Sport Day	Erdei tornaverseny
9	The Canary Chicks	A kanárifiókák
10	The Sandcastle	A homokvár
11	Blueberries	Áfonyaszedés
12	Gingerbread	Mézeskalácsok
13	Hot Air Balloon	Léggömb

=== Series 3 ===
This series was released as the film Berry and Dolly - Playmates (original title: Bogyó és Babóca 3. - Játszótársak) in 2012.

Episode	Title	Original title
1	Sunflowers	Napraforgók
2	Pebbles	Kavicsok
3	Flutter Goes Skiing	Pihe síel
4	The Puppet Show	Bábszínház
5	The Scooter	Roller
6	Bubble's Tower	Gömbi tornya
7	The Mushroom's Cap	A gomba kalapja
8	The Football Match	Focimeccs
9	Easter Eggs	Hímestojások
10	Bad Dream	Rossz álom
11	Dumplings	Gombócok
12	The Star House	Csillagház
13	The Board Game	Társasjáték

=== Series 4 ===
This series was released as the film Berry and Dolly - Fairy Cards (original title: Bogyó és Babóca 4. - Tündérkártyák) in 2013 which contained 14 of the 17 episodes (leaving out Doctor Owl Gets Sick, Starship, and Bubble Has Hiccups) due to its runtime.

Episode	Title	Original title	Alternate Episode Numbers
1	Dolly's Flowers	Babóca virága	4
2	The Robot	Robot	10
3	The Ant Choir	A hangyák kórusa	5
4	Seashells	Kagylók	9
5	Little Kids And Big Kids	Kicsik és nagyok	12
6	Berry's Picture	Bogyó rajza	3
7	The Windmill	Szélmalom	8
8	The Moon Beetle	Holdbogár	13
9	Butterfly Girls	Lepkelányok	15
10	Bubbles	Buborékok	2
11	Lanterns	Lámpások	14
12	Fairy Cards	Tündérkártya	1
13	The Big Wheel	Óriáskerék	16
14	Four Seasons	Évszakmanók	17
15	Doctor Owl Gets Sick	Bagolydoktor beteg	11
16	Starship	Csillaghajó	6
17	Bubble Has Hiccups	Gömbi csuklik	7

=== Series 5 ===
This series was released in original as the film Bogyó és Babóca - Hónapok meséi)

Episode	Title	Original title
1	January - Eddie and the Toy Car	Január - Döme és a kisautó
2	February - Fancy-Dress at Stanley's	Február - Farsang Vendelnél
3	March - Spring Dance	Március - Karikázó
4	April - Bouncy Castle	Április - Ugrálóvár
5	May - The Runaway Raft	Május - Az elsodródott tutaj
6	June - The Lily Fairy	Június - A liliomtündér
7	July - Alfonso's Ice lollies	Július - Alfonz jégkréme
8	August - The Moon Seesaw	Augusztus - Holdhinta
9	September - Reggie Squirrel	Szeptember - Mókus Regő
10	October - Bubble Tidies Up	Október - Gömbi rendet rak
11	November - The Green Grub	November - A zöld kukac
12	December - Dolly's Music Box	December - Babóca zenélő doboza
13	Dr. Owl and the Cakes	Bagolydoktor és a sütemények
