= István Dégi =

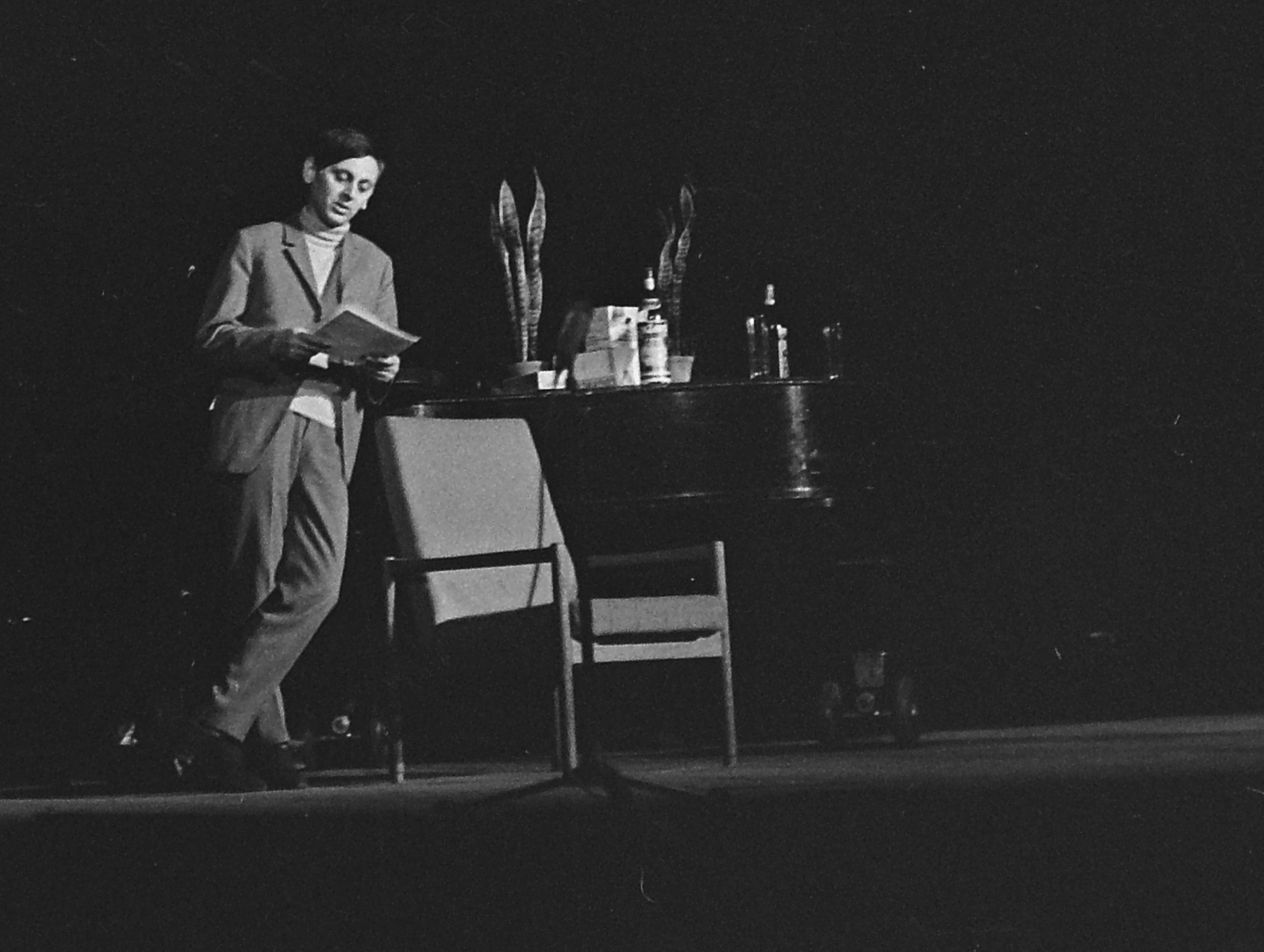

István Dégi (born Makó, August 21, 1935 - died Budapest, November 8, 1992) was a Hungarian actor.

== Partial filmography ==
- Szerelem csütörtök (1959)
- Gyalog a mennyországba (1959)
- Égrenyíló ablak (1960) - Nagyfülü
- Sikátor (1967) - Tóth Feri
- Lássátok feleim (1968) - Juhász szobrász
- Fiúk a térröl (1968) - Vallató
- Sziget a szárazföldön (1969) - Fiatal férj
- Imposztorok (1969) - Angelicus páter
- The Toth Family (1969) - Gyuri, a postás
- Krebsz, az isten (1970) - A központ munkatársa
- Utazás a koponyám körül (1970) - Író
- N.N. a halál angyala (1970) - Vári Elemér, fõhadnagy
- Szép magyar komédia (1970)
- Derzhis za oblaka (1971) - Börtönpap
- A halhatatlan légiós (1971) - Kratochwill
- Hahó, Öcsi! (1971) - III. Bölcs
- Hekus lettem (1972) - Payer Henrik
- A völegény nyolckor érkezik (1972) - Géza
- A magyar ugaron (1973) - Nyomozó
- Kakuk Marci (1973) - Csurinyák Ferenc
- Jelbeszéd (1974) - Varga
- Tükörképek (1976) - Egy ápolt
- The Fifth Seal (1976) - Keszei Károly
- Tótágas (1976) - Szülõ
- A kard (1977) - Szakértõ
- A csillagszemü (1977) - Orbán
- Amerikai cigaretta (1978) - Szerkesztõségi tag
- Kojak Budapesten (1980)
- Rohanj velem! (1982) - Karcsi bácsi, a pszichológus
- Macbeth (1983, TV Movie)
- Vérszerzödés (1983) - Kukler százados
- Az utolsó futam (1983) - Tojásos Frédi
- Az óriás (1984)
- A nagy generáció (1986)
- Akli Miklós (1986) - Assailant
- Elysium (1987)
- Szamárköhögés (1987) - Pedellus
- Küldetés Evianba (1988) - Steiner
- Hanussen (1988)
- Paths of Death and Angels (1991) - Árpi
- Erózió (1992) - Nagyapa
- Bolse vita (1996) - (final film role)
