= Gábor Reviczky =

Hungarian actor

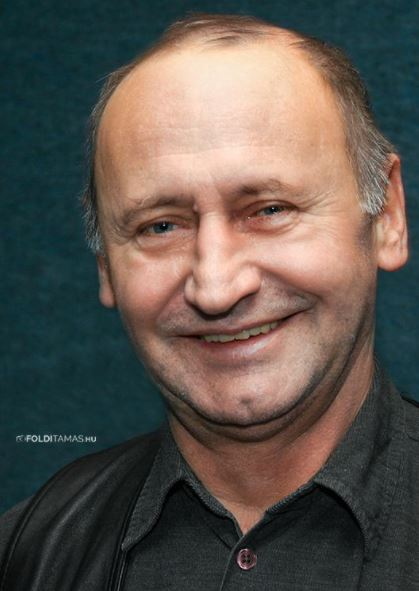
Gábor Reviczky

Gábor Reviczky (born March 28, 1949) is a Hungarian actor.

== Selected filmography ==
- 1985 The Red Countess
- 1985 Mata Hari
- 1990 Good Evening, Mr. Wallenberg
- 1991 Paths of Death and Angels
- 1992 The Summer Guest
- 1994 Woyzeck
- 1997 Dollybirds
- 1997 Out of Order
- 2001 Glass Tiger
- 2015 Liza, the Fox-Fairy
