= Gábor Nógrádi =

Gábor Nógrádi (born June 22, 1947, Nyíregyháza) is a Hungarian book author, screenwriter, playwright, essayist, publicist and poet who is best known for his children's novels, such as the Pigeon Granny and The Story of Pie (original title PetePite), a book which won the 2002 Children's Book of the Year award, was on the Honor List of the International Board on Books for Young People (IBBI) and was ranked among the 100 most popular books in Hungary in the 2005 'Big Book' competition.

His books have become part of Hungary's national school curriculum in literature.

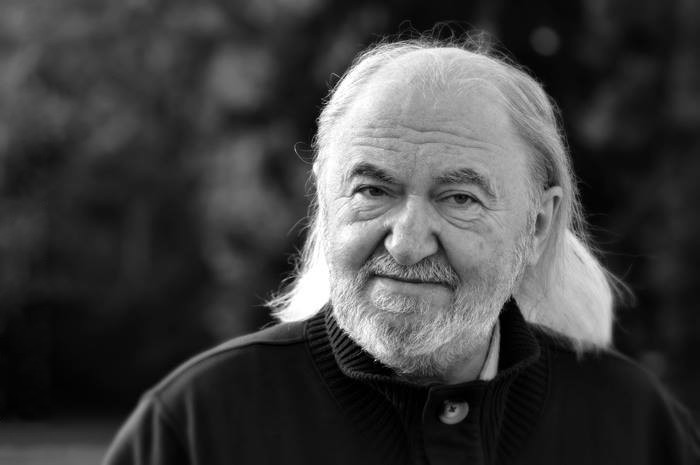

Over the past forty years, Nogradi has become Hungary's best-selling modern children's author. His work is noted for its "realistic storytelling", humor and surprising twists. His novels are frequently themed around the fears and struggles children have to face in their formative years at difficult times, such as divorce, falling in love, fear of failure and conflicts at school or in the family. His books are published by MORA, the biggest publisher in Hungary for children literature.

He is also an accomplished scriptwriter, playwright, television writer and publicist. He wrote six scripts for motion pictures, each of which made it to the big screen, including the comedy-drama We Never Die (Hungarian title: "Sose Halunk Meg"), which was selected as the Hungarian entry for the Best Foreign Language Film at the 66th Academy Awards (but was not nominated).

== Early life ==
Born in 1947 to Jewish parents in poverty-stricken Hungary and growing up in the darkest age of communism in Eastern Europe, Nogradi looks back on his childhood as harrowing and unhappy, given his family's difficult economic status and the inexorable antisemitism of the communist regime. He had a very close, loving relationship with his mother, Katalin Hoffman, a survivor of Auschwitz. She was a literate and thoughtful woman who loved poetry and classical music. Gabor's mother died from cancer when he was seven. She had taught him how to read. He became a fervent reader and devoured every book he could find in the local library. He read at night, hiding under the bed cover with a flashlight, because his father, a woodworker, viewed reading books as "utterly useless" and "a waste of time".

Although he did very well in school, he was refused admission into the Gymnasium (academic high school), and therefore was denied the chance to go to university. He was forced to go to technical school for high school, where he learned how to operate machinery, but he never worked as a technician. He aspired to become a poet - an idea that both his family and his environment regarded as utterly insane. His life mirrors his philosophy on survival: "The deeper one finds himself at the bottom of the pool, the bigger push he can give to himself, as long as he is determined enough to get to the surface." Nogradi credits his early childhood experiences with much of his success in writing, as he says it helped him to "develop an extreme layer of toughness to handle rejections."

== Career ==
His first book of poems titled Kéthátú életünkben ("In Our Double-Back Life") was published in 1973. His first job was selling books of classics door-to-door. He later became a journalist for a Hungarian cultural weekly, Új Tükör ("New Mirror") and worked there as a reporter and publicist for fifteen years. He also worked as editor of the national daily Kurír. He wrote over seven radio plays for the Hungarian Radio and wrote series for the Hungarian TV. He was thirty-five when he decided to start writing novels for children.

== Trademark ==
He transposed his tumultuous childhood experiences into the characters of his novels - hence the birth of the recurring hero in most of his books: the rebellious, warring child who fights against injustice, fights for his rights and for the preservation of his or her individuality. Whether it is the cheeky little girl Emma, who drives her father nuts with her world-changing ideas and her constant desire for free spirit, or twelve-year-old Emily, who one morning wakes up realizing she had switched bodies with her mom - they all have one thing in common: an undeterred fighting spirit to understand the world around them and to make the world understand them. His goal is to help his readers "to identify their own dreams and conflicts in the adventures of the heroes and heroines in my novels, who must face realities and choices, not always easy or happy ones."

== Books ==
Hetcheky and The Little Kidnappers

Gabor Nogradi wrote his first book for children (original title: Hetcheky and the Little Kidnappers) about a young boy who stages his own kidnapping with his circle of friends in an attempt to reunite his divorced parents. A jolly detective figures out the truth and finds the boy hiding in an attic, but instead of exposing the kids, he decides to come to the aid of the desperate children. A provocative and enticing plot, a police investigation, mischievous twins, humor, love, friendship, loyalty, courage, a tumultuous family, oddball neighbors, an evil mother-in-law, and a Hollywood-style happy ending - all parts of an exciting and whimsical novel. The book was made into the children movie Kidnapping on Palank Street (Gyerekrablás a Palánk utcában) in 1986. Nogradi wrote the script to the movie.

=== Granny Halle and the Cheeky Burglars ===
The sequel titled (original title's translation: Hetcheky and the cheeky burglars), is a humorous novel about a bunch of vivacious kids who steal from crooked entrepreneurs, 'Robin Hood style', under the direction of the brassy granny in order to help their parents overcome some financial difficulties. The hearty detective, known from the first novel, appears again, investigates and naturally, comes to the aid of the little rascals once again.

Help, It's a Human!

His next book, "Help, It's a Human! ("Segítség, Ember!") was inspired by his younger son, Benjamin, an animal enthusiast who kept all kinds of pets in his room from hamsters to parrots and a dozen aquariums full of tropical fish. The book explains how to look after pets and exotic animals, written in a humorous and sarcastic style from the point of view of the animals, revealing how silly humans can be with their pets when they have no clue how to care about them. The book was a critical success, became a bestseller and never went out of print since it appeared. It was also made into a musical and its chapters have become a common choice for school children attending recital and speaking competitions.

The story of Pie

In this amusing and thought-provoking book, father and son wake up one morning and find that they had swapped bodies. For a few days, therefore, they have to live each other's lives: the father goes to school, the boy must go to work at a television studio. Trading places gives them the opportunity to learn more about each other, understand themselves and their relationship better. The novel was awarded the Children's Book of the Year Prize in 2002 and was on the IBBY Honor list and was voted as one of the best-loved 100 novels in the Hungarian 'Big Book contest.

(Big Book was the Hungarian version of the BBC’s Big Read in Britain in 2003. Over 1400 libraries, 500 bookshops and 1300 schools participated in the competition. It proved to be far more popular in Hungary (with a population of 10 million) than in the UK (with a population of 60 million), with 400,000 votes sent in, almost three times the participation in the UK competition (140,000 votes).

Being My Mom

This time it is daughter and mom who switch bodies, following the successful intervention of the somewhat wacky and eccentric scientist grandpa, whose constant desire to improve the world resembles the enthusiasm of Christopher Lloyd's character (Dr. Emmett Brown - 'Doc') from the movie "Back to the Future." The confusion that ensues creates a funny and exciting novel. About the book, Nogradi said, "The idea of mom and daughter swapping bodies was an idea raised by children at one of the book signings. At first I was hesitant to write the book, because writing a story about the inner feelings and thoughts of a small girl and her mother seemed a bit scary, but it became one of the most cherished books I ever wrote." The book was made into a comedy and was premiered in theaters in Hungary.

How to Teach...?

Want to know how to discipline your school buddy, your math teacher, your cat, and the housefly? How to educate your family members—your little brother, your uncle, your grandma? How to turn your Dachshund into a pit bull and yourself into a top-of-the-class student? No problem! Just read the 50+ humorous guidance and playful instructions in this book that will tell you exactly what to do and how to do it. As the author suggests, "When I was a kid, everybody believed that disciplining a child will create miracles. And sometimes it does. This book is about the fact that everything and everyone can be disciplined. (Except, of course, ourselves, because our personality is as sturdy as the icebergs at the North Pole. When I wrote the first instructions on how to discipline our family members, I suddenly realized: I can discipline anyone from a UFO to the police and the ghost in the attic. And I did, with no mercy!"

Beyond The Seven Seas

Miracles happen when you really believe in them. And if you do all you can to make them happen. Benedict knows that his mom could not have disappeared forever when she went to swim in the sea. He believes that she is still alive and one day she will return. The weeks and months can pass, there can be a bunch of doubters around him and even grandma can make arrangements to bring a new mommy to Dad, but Benedict knows that Mom is alive! Maybe the UFOs took her. Maybe Mickey the monkey from the fairy tale picked her up will bring her back in his boat. Maybe smugglers picked her up in that sudden sea storm on that fateful day, took her far away, beyond the seven seas, but one day, someone picks up the phone and calls a number at home…

This is the most personal novel by the author and his favorite one, by his own admission.

Anna Moll

Inspired by one of his favorite childhood poets, Edgar Lee Masters, and his "Spoon River Anthology," he wrote a series of poems titled "We Lived Here among You," under the pseudonym Anna Moll. These are witty epitaphs from a fictional pet cemetery of an American town in the Midwest, Billingstone, in which the animals tell their stories from beyond the grave.

== Book tours ==
Gabor Nogradi has become famous for personally reaching out to his readers in the form of lectures and author/reader meetings in primary schools and local libraries across Hungary, Austria, Slovakia and Slovenia. He is willing to travel to "any village with a zip code," when he is invited to a school or library to deliver his message. His talks include overcoming obstacles in life, exploring talents, and the importance of reading literature for pleasure in the growth of a child. Over the past decade, he has conducted 800+ lectures and personally met over 40,000 of his loyal readers, an accomplishment that has never been done by any other children's book writer before.

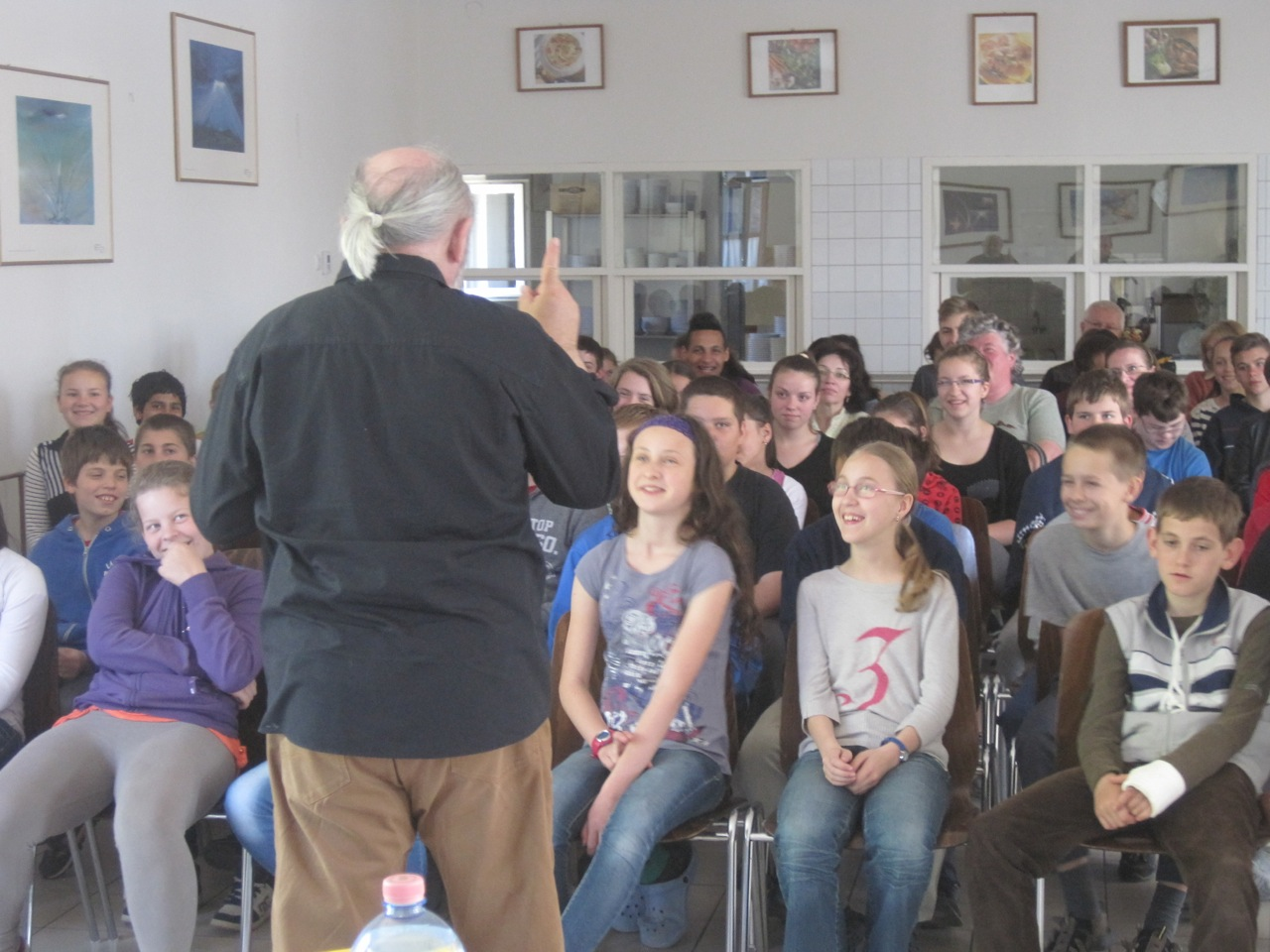
Gabor Nogradi is giving lecture to schoolchildren

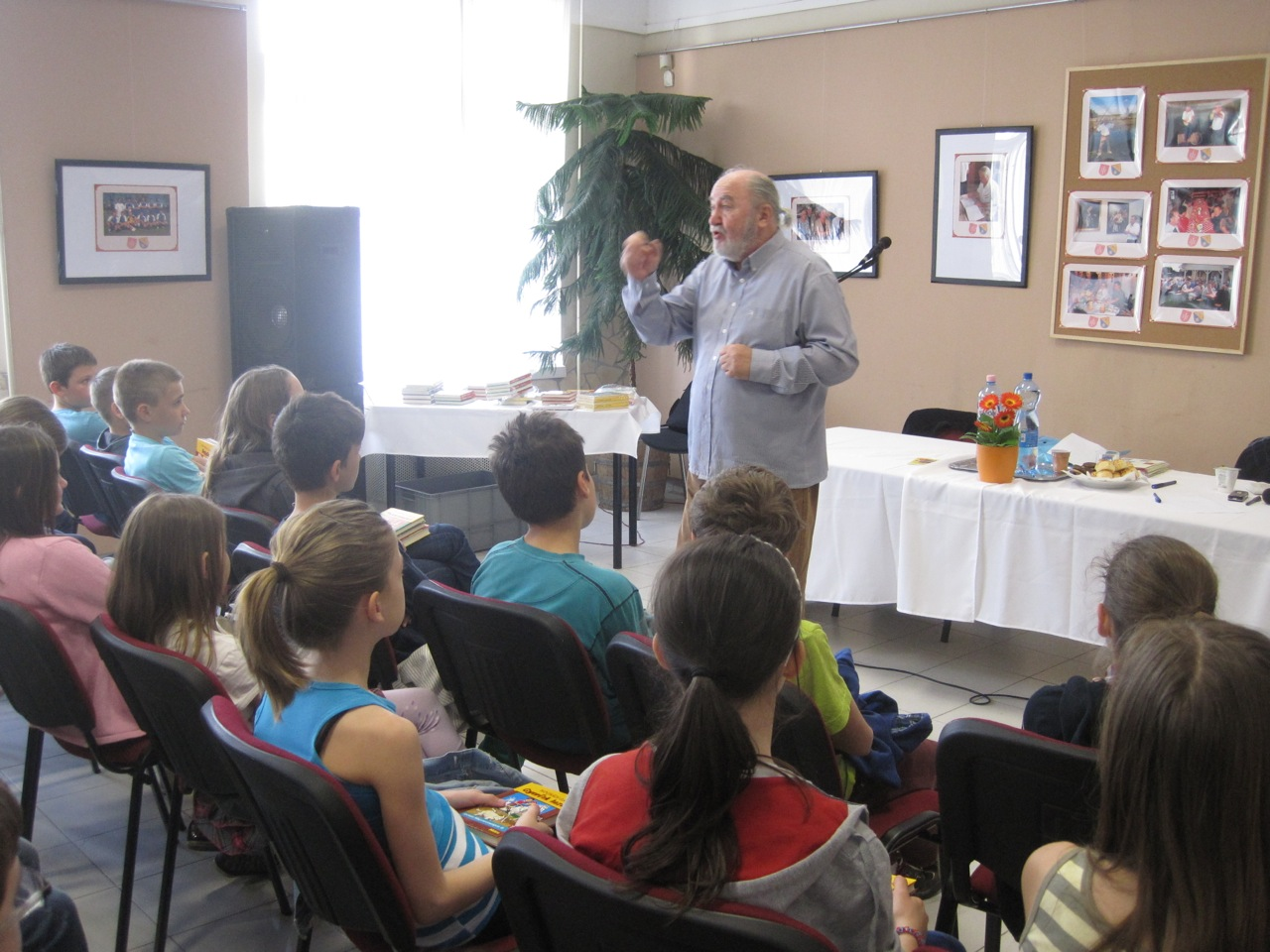
Lecturing children about the importance of reading

== Personal life ==
Nogradi lives in Göd, a small town near Budapest, the capital of Hungary, with Krisztina, in a house overlooking the curve of the Danube. He has two sons by his ex-wife, Judit Varhalmi. Both followed his path with their literary endeavors, although his older son, Gregory, became an opera singer, while his younger son Ben has pursued a career in public speaking.

== Reception and awards ==
Nogradi won the Janikovszky-Eva award in 2003, but he has never received any national awards. As he says, "They look at me as an outsider, because the people who give the awards in our country do not fully understand what I have been trying to accomplish with my work and my projects. Fortunately, my readers, the children (and their parents) do, so as long as they love and read my books, I am happy. As a famous Hungarian poet, Sandor Weöres, once said, a writer, if he is any good, must live a sort of life that the powers that be do not even consider him for an award.... I agree."

== Beliefs and philosophy ==
Quotes by Gabor Nogradi

On the role of the children book writer

"Every adult who works with children has an enormous responsibility. Just as one must put extra care into nurturing a growing tree or a puppy compared to dealing with an old tree or a fully-grown dog. An author writing for youth can help his readers open the door to a new world, the mystery of social encounters, the secret of human relations. He can reassure the strengths of the child's personality, he can decrease his anxiety and fears, he has the ability to deepen his knowledge, he can help him better understand the world. He can direct him to good or bad directions. The right book can be the best therapy, friend and teacher for the distressed child."

On exploring talent

"Everybody is born to be a genius. If a child's talent cannot blossom the way it should, that is not the child's fault, but the school system and the environment he lives in. The responsibility of the parent is tiny, because most parents have never been trained to be teachers. When something is wrong with our car, our watch or our house, we call a professional to fix it. No one wants to repair these himself. In modern society, it is not enough to love the children. No seed will become a flower just because it gets love. It also needs professional care and nursing to bloom. So if we do not nurse and protect the child's talent, he will become a gloomy adult and the whole world will be poorer. The true values of a nation are in the souls and minds of its people, not in the vaults of the National Bank."

On the importance of reading literature for pleasure

"Books have vital roles in man's life just like any other art forms: they cure the soul, they educate us with the knowledge and the message within the lines, they improve self-knowledge, they enhance the imagination, sharpen the creativity. It is like medicine for the soul. It helps us to relief pain, to get rid of fears, lessen our depression. The significance of the right literature for the right person is downright more effective than any other form of guidance, including religion or parenting. It is therefore paramount that the child reads for his own pleasure from an early age. And the way to do this is to show him the type of books that he would likely enjoy, which is not necessarily the book the school or society considers as valuable. To do that, of course, his family members and those who are entrusted with the child's care must consider his personality and interest. My younger son, Ben, was infatuated with wildlife and the animal world. So what did I do? I lavished him with books by Gerald Durrell and David Attenborough and Jane Goodall, and any book I could find on the animal kingdom, no expense spared. And before he knew it, he finished two books a week and soon began reading books, by own choice, like 'The Jungle Book' and 'Treasure Island' and the works of Mark Twain."

On the pursuit of happiness

"For each of us a different path leads to happiness. Nobody can be forced to a particular direction with the idea that he finds pleasure there, if he does not. The child must be allowed to find his own way, just like the root grows in the ground, avoiding stones, seeking nutrients. Even if we find his interests a bit odd, we must support him in whatever he finds pleasure. We cannot make someone happy just out of sheer desire, but we can help him in his quest for it, and hope for the best."

On his legacy

"I believe that future readers of my books will find more and more of the 'subliminal messages' between the lines. Today's fads, trends, shortsightedness, ignorance can disguise a deeper understanding of what I try to get through to minds. This is natural. For generations to come it is common sense what is hard to fathom today for many. In my life I have reached a significant number of people compared to the masses I will teach after I am gone for decades to come."

== Biography ==
To date he has written 28 novels, four poem-anthologies, nine movie scripts, eight radio-plays and three musicals.

Kéthátú életünkben (1973)

Hecseki és a gyermekrablók (1983)

Hecseki és a kedves betörők (1987)

Segítség, ember! (1989)

Itt éltünk köztetek - Állatsírversek (Anna Moll néven) (1990)

A mi Kinizsink (1990)

Hogyan neveljünk...? (1995)

Újra: Segítség, ember! (1996)

No, és hogyan neveljük….? (1996)

Galambnagymama (1996)

Mit jelent a piros kerek? Verses képeskönyv (1997)

Petepite (2000)

Az anyu én vagyok! (2002)

A pénz nem a fákon nő! (2003)

Gyerünk haza! (2004)

Ide nekem a címlapot is! (A médiakapcsolatok művészete) (2004)

Vigyázz, hogy sose érjen baj (2005

Édes Munyimunyi (Az Óperencián túl) (2005)

Ki érti ezt? (2005)

A bátyám zseni! (2006)

Nézz rám, mami! (2006)

Marci öröksége (2007)

Marci visszavág (2008)

Az öcsém zseni (2009)

Papa, ne már! (Samu és Papa 1.) (2010)

Nem vagyok Samu! (Samu és Papa 2.) (2011)

A mi Dózsánk (2014)

Láttam, mi történt (2014)

A nagyikám zseni (2015)

Emmike, nem semmike (2015)

== Movies ==
Egy szoknya, egy nadrág (2005)

A mi Kinizsink (tévéfilm, 2002)

Csocsó, avagy éljen május elseje! (2001)

Meseautó (2000)

Hippolyt (1999)

Patika (tévésorozat, 1995)

Sose halunk meg (1993)

Kutyakomédiák (tévésorozat, 1992)

Gyerekrablás a Palánk utcában (1985)
