= The Lord's Lantern in Budapest =

- Directed by: Miklós Jancsó
- Written by: Miklós Jancsó
- Starring: Zoltán Mucsi
- Release date: 28 January 1999
- Running time: 103 minutes
- Country: Hungary
- Language: Hungarian

The Lord's Lantern in Budapest (Hungarian: Nekem lámpást adott kezembe az Úr Pesten) is a 1999 Hungarian film written and directed by Miklós Jancsó. It was Hungary's official Best Foreign Language Film submission at the 72nd Academy Awards, but did not manage to receive a nomination.

== Cast ==
- Zoltán Mucsi as Kapa
- Péter Scherer as Pepe
- József Szarvas as Józsi
- Miklós Jancsó as Himself
- Gyula Hernádi as Himself

== See also ==
- List of submissions to the 72nd Academy Awards for Best Foreign Language Film
- List of Hungarian submissions for the Academy Award for Best Foreign Language Film
