= Rain and Shine =

1977 film

- Directed by: Ferenc András
- Starring: Erzsi Pásztor; Ildikó Pécsi
- Release date: 25 August 1977
- Running time: 1h 50min
- Country: Hungary
- Language: Hungarian

Rain and Shine (Hungarian: Veri az ördög a feleségét) is a 1977 Hungarian comedy film directed by Ferenc András.
