= Carnival Scenes =

1981 film

- Directed by: Lucian Pintilie
- Written by: Michael Köhlmeier
- Starring: Victor Rebengiuc
- Release date: 1981
- Running time: 119 minutes
- Country: Romania
- Language: Romanian

Carnival Scenes (Romanian: De ce trag clopotele, Mitică?, literally, "Why the bells are ringing, Mitică?") is a 1981 Romanian comedy film directed by Lucian Pintilie. It was banned in Romania and was not shown until after the 1989 revolution. The film was selected as the Romanian entry for the Best Foreign Language Film at the 63rd Academy Awards, but was not accepted as a nominee.

== Cast ==
- Victor Rebengiuc as Pampon
- Mariana Mihuț as Mița Baston
- Petre Gheorghiu (as Crăcănel)
- Tora Vasilescu as Didina Mazu
- Gheorghe Dinică as Nae
- Mircea Diaconu as Iordache
- Ștefan Bănică
- Tamara Buciuceanu
- Ovidiu Schumacher

== See also ==
- List of submissions to the 63rd Academy Awards for Best Foreign Language Film
- List of Romanian submissions for the Academy Award for Best Foreign Language Film
