= Lajos Kovács (actor) =

Hungarian actor

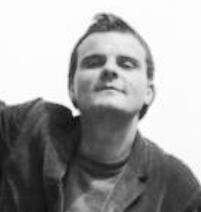
- Kovács in 1966
- Born: 9 February 1944 (age 82); Bátaszék, Hungary
- Occupation: Actor
- Years active: 1967-present

Lajos Kovács (born 9 February 1944) is a Hungarian actor. He appeared in more than ninety films since 1978 in addition to the music video for Radiohead's 1997 single "Karma Police".

== Selected filmography ==
Year	Title	Role	Notes
1984	Maria's Day	István Petőfi	
1994	Woyzeck	Woyzeck	
1997	The Witman Boys	Dénes Witman	
2003	Kontroll	Béla	
2004	Argo	Tibi Balog	
