= Little but Tough =

1989 film

- Directed by: Ferenc Grunwalsky
- Written by: Ferenc Grunwalsky
- Starring: Sándor Gáspár
- Release date: 1989
- Running time: 95 minutes
- Country: Hungary
- Language: Hungarian

Little but Tough (Hungarian: Kicsi, de nagyon erős) is a 1989 Hungarian drama film directed by Ferenc Grunwalsky. The film was submitted as the Hungarian entry for the Best Foreign Language Film at the 63rd Academy Awards, but was not accepted as a nominee.

== Cast ==
- Sándor Gáspár as Bogár Pál
- Ágnes Csere as Zsuzsa
- János Bán as Béla
- Péter Blaskó as Nyomozó
- Zoltán Mucsi as Juszuf
- István Mészáros as Törpe

== See also ==
- List of submissions to the 63rd Academy Awards for Best Foreign Language Film
- List of Hungarian submissions for the Academy Award for Best Foreign Language Film
