= Glass Tiger (film) =

2001 Hungarian comedy film by Péter Rudolf and Iván Kapitány

- Directed by: Iván Kapitány; Péter Rudolf
- Written by: Gábor Olivér Buss; Hilda Hársing; Iván Kapitány; Péter Rudolf
- Produced by: Ági Pataki; Gábor Kovács
- Starring: Péter Rudolf; Gábor Reviczky; Sándor Gáspár; Imre Csuja; Szarvas József; Lajos Horváth Ottó
- Cinematography: Iván Kapitány
- Edited by: Csaba Vass
- Music by: László Dés
- Production company: Filmpartners
- Distributed by: Budapest Film
- Release date: 18 October 2001
- Running time: 100 minutes
- Country: Hungary
- Language: Hungarian
- Budget: 150 million Ft (~$555,000)

Glass Tiger (Hungarian: Üvegtigris) is a 2001 Hungarian comedy film directed by Iván Kapitány and Péter Rudolf.

Produced by Filmpartners, the film was released in Hungary at October 18, 2001 by Budapest Film and has since become a cult film. It was followed by two sequels, Glass Tiger 2 in 2006 and Glass Tiger 3 in 2010.

== Cast ==
- Péter Rudolf - Lali
- Gábor Reviczky - Gaben
- Imre Csuja - Csoki
- Sándor Gáspár - Róka
- József Szarvas - Cingár
- Lajos Ottó Horváth - Sanyi
