= Sweet Emma, Dear Böbe =

1992 film

- Directed by: István Szabó
- Written by: Andrea Vészits; István Szabó
- Screenplay by: István Szabó
- Produced by: Gabriella Grósz
- Starring: Johanna ter Steege; Enikő Börcsök
- Cinematography: Lajos Koltai
- Edited by: Eszter Kovács
- Music by: Mihály Móricz; Tibor Bornai; Feró Nagy; Robert Schumann
- Release date: 20 March 1992
- Running time: 90 minutes
- Country: Hungary
- Languages: Hungarian; German; Russian; English

Sweet Emma, Dear Böbe (Hungarian: Édes Emma, drága Böbe - vázlatok, aktok) is a 1992 Hungarian drama film co-written and directed by István Szabó. It was entered into the 42nd Berlin International Film Festival where it won the Silver Bear - Special Jury Prize. The film was selected as the Hungarian entry for the Best Foreign Language Film at the 65th Academy Awards, but was not accepted as a nominee.

== Plot ==
After that Russian language had been removed from compulsory subjects of Hungarian schools the two Russian teachers, Emma and Böbe became redundant. The teaching staff also were shaken of insecurity, accusing each other. Emma and Böbe are learning English in the evenings. Emma also sells newspapers and she has an affair with the married school director, who is not too brave to decide. One of the best scenes of the film when Böbe and many naked women - teachers and nurses - are waiting for casting in a film studio. Böbe is acquainted with foreigners and she trades in foreign currencies. Böbe will be arrested and she finally jumps out of the window of the teachers' accommodation.

== Cast ==
- Johanna ter Steege as Emma
- Enikö Börcsök as Böbe
- Péter Andorai as Stefanics - Director
- Éva Kerekes as Szundi
- Ildikó Bánsági as Emma (voice)
- Irma Patkós as Hermina
- Erzsi Pásztor as Rózsa
- Hédi Temessy as Mária
- Irén Bódis as Emma's mother
- Erzsi Gaál as Storekeeper
- Zoltán Mucsi as Szilárd, Art teacher
- Tamás Jordán as Szaglár Capt.
- Gábor Máté as Officer

== Analysis and reception ==
The film shows the political system's changes in Budapest. "Szabó's sensitive handling of the material culminates in a meditative passage in which Emma stands in church, musing on the 'passion for love' which masks lack of purpose. 'Collective sin' may be dead, according to Böbe, but this movingly delineates the private pain of atonement", commented Time Out.

== Awards ==
- 1992 Berlin International Film Festival, Won Prize of the Ecumenical Jury - Special Mention, Competition- István Szabó
- 1992 Berlin International Film Festival, Silver Berlin Bear, Special Jury Prize- István Szabó
- 1992 European Film Award, Best Screenwriter- István Szabó

== See also ==
- List of submissions to the 65th Academy Awards for Best Foreign Language Film
- List of Hungarian submissions for the Academy Award for Best Foreign Language Film
