= Tales from the Lakeside =

2017 film by Zsolt Pálfi

- Film poster
- Original title: Lengemesék
- Directed by: Zsolt Pálfi
- Written by: Judit Berg
- Starring: András Faragó; Anna Kubik; Tamás Markovics
- Production company: Cinemon Entertainment Vertigo Média-Studio
- Release date: 27 April 2017
- Running time: 65 minutes
- Country: Hungary
- Languages: Hungarian; English; French

Tales from the Lakeside (Hungarian: Lengemesék) is a 2017 Hungarian animated adventure fantasy family film written and directed by Zsolt Pálfi. The film stars András Faragó, Anna Kubik and Tamás Markovics in the lead roles. The film was released on 27 April 2017 and received positive reviews from critics. The film also received several awards and nominations in international film festivals. Its sequel Willy and the Guardians of the Lake was released on 6 December 2018 and received positive reviews.

== Synopsis ==
The green Verdies are small and minute, but yet are courageous guardians of the lakeside. Verdies only become guardians when they reach an age in which their hair turns brown in colour and until then life is boring. The green haired youngsters are not allowed to fly on warblers to row boats alone along the lake or even to ride wild frogs at the rodeo.

== Cast ==
- András Faragó
- Anna Kubik
- Tamás Markovics
- Csongor Szalay
- Péter Bercsényi
- Róbert Bolla

== Awards and nominations ==
| Year | Award | Category | Result |
|---|---|---|---|
| 2017 | Montréal International Children's Film Festival | Special Jury Prize | Nominated |
| 2017 | South Film and Arts Academy Festival | Jury Prize Best Feature Animation | Won |
| 2017 | Chicago International Children's Film Festival | Animation Jury Award | Won |
| 2017 | Chicago International Children's Film Festival | Children's Jury Award | Won |
| 2018 | Overcome Film Festival | Jury Prize Best Feature Animation | Won |
| 2018 | The Monthly Film Festival | March Award | Nominated |
| 2018 | Hungarian Film Critics Awards | Film Critics Award | Won |
| 2018 | Los Angeles Screen Award | Best Feature Animation | Won |
| 2018 | Maryland International Film Festival | Best Feature Film | Nominated |
| 2018 | Epic ACG Fest | Best Feature Animation | Won |
