= Willy and the Guardians of the Lake =

2018 Hungarian animation family film

- Film poster
- Hungarian: Lengemesék 2: Tél a Nádtengeren
- Directed by: Zsólt Pálfi
- Written by: Judit Berg
- Starring: András Faragó; Anna Kubik; Tamás Markovics
- Production companies: Cinemon Entertainment; Vertigo Média-Studio
- Distributed by: Netflix
- Release date: 6 December 2018
- Running time: 70 minutes
- Country: Hungary
- Languages: Hungarian; English

Willy and the Guardians of the Lake: Tales from the Lakeside Winter Adventure (Hungarian: Lengemesék 2 - Tél a Nádtengeren) is a 2018 Hungarian animation family film written and directed by Zsólt Pálfi. The film is a sequel to the 2017 animation film Tales from the Lakeside. The film stars András Faragó, Anna Kubik and Tamás Markovics in the lead roles. The film was released on 6 December 2018 and received positive reviews from critics. It was also streamed via Netflix on 27 March 2020 until April 1, 2022. The film also received several awards and nominations in international film festivals.

== Plot ==
The green Verdies are small and minute, but yet are courageous guardians of the lakeside. Verdies only become guardians when they reach an age in which their hair turns brown in colour and until then life is boring. The green haired youngsters are not allowed to fly on warblers to row boats alone along the lake or even to ride wild frogs at the rodeo. Willy Whistle's big dream is to become a guardian one day but his curiosity always gets him into trouble.

== Cast ==
Character	Voice actor		
Character	Hungary	United Kingdom	United States
Willy	Csongor Szalay	Gerran Howell	Lucien Dodge
Lily	Sára Vida	Sophie Colquhoun	Rachelle Heger
Barry Bladderwort			Kaiji Tang
King	András Faragó	Tim McMullan	

- Anna Kubik
- Tamás Markovics
- Péter Bercsényi
- Róbert Bolla
