= Zoltán Kamondi =

Hungarian film director (1960–2016)

- Born: 6 April 1960; Budapest, Hungary
- Died: 17 March 2016 (aged 55)
- Occupations: Film director, screenwriter, actor
- Years active: 1987–2016

Zoltán Kamondi (6 April 1960 – 17 March 2016) was a Hungarian film director, actor, screenwriter and producer. He was born in 1960 in Budapest, Hungary.

== Biography ==
After finishing his studies at the Faculty of Art, Kamondi earned a degree in film direction at the Academy of Drama and Film, where he graduated in 1988. He won many festival awards with his short films. Between 1986 and 1988, he was a member of the directors’ board of Balázs Béla Film Studio.

In 1989 he worked as a war correspondent for Japanese and French television and Radio Free Europe during the Romanian Revolution. At the same time he worked with Károly Makk as script writer and co-director. His film Paths of Death and Angels was screened in the Un Certain Regard section at the 1991 Cannes Film Festival.

In 2002, he started teaching at the Hungarian Film Academy. In 2003 he was awarded the Balázs Béla Prize.

== Filmography ==
In 1985 he directed the short feature film Kiki and the Males while at the Academy of Drama and Film. At the Berlin Short Film Festival, Germany, it won for Director. At the American Film Academy, Los Angeles it was nominated for “Student" Oscar. In 1990 he made his first film Paths of Death and Angels, which was screened in Cannes, Sélection Officielle “Un Certain Regard", and was invited to festivals in Moscow, Chicago, Tokyo, Ghent, Paris and Orleans. It won the Best Film Music Award in San Remo.

The Subconscious Station (1987–88) is an unfinished feature film, begun at BBS-FMS-Objektív Studio.

In 1999 his feature film The Alchemist and the Virgin was released. The film won the Independent Feature Award at the Manchester International Film Festival in the US. In Berlin at Prix Europe it placed fourth. It won the Critics’ Award for Cinematography and for the Leading Actress. It was invited to film festivals in Alexandria, Boston, Calcutta, Madrid, Dhaka, Vancouver and Porto.

In 2001 he made a 25-hour documentary about the life and work of the Hungarian poet György Petri, In Memoriam György Petri. The interview was held just before the poet’s death.

In 2002 he made feature film Temptations. At the 33rd Hungarian Film Week it won for Director, Cinematography and Leading Male Actor. It was a Golden Bear Nominee at the Berlin International Film Festival. It won national and international festival awards. The European Film selected it to compete for the Best European Film. At the Bulgarian International Film Festival – Varna it took the Jury’s Special Prize. At the 23rd International Camera Festival Manuki Brothers – Macedonia it won the Bronze Camera. At the 8th Pyongyang International Film Festival – North Korea it took Cinematography. At the Hungarian Film Critics’ Choice 2003 it won for Script.

In 2007 he completed the feature film Dolina based on the novel The Archbishop’s Visit by Ádám Bodor on which he had been working since 2000. It was presented at the 38th Hungarian Film Week where it won for Artistic Contribution. The film was officially selected in Competition at the 42nd Karlovy Vary International Film Festival where it was a Crystal Globe Nominee, and won several international awards, including three in US. At the 28th International Cinematographer's Film Festival "Manaki Brothers" it won a Special diploma. At the Hungarian Film Critics' Choice 2008 it won for cinematographer. At Fantasporto International Film Festival 2008 (Portugal) it won for cinematographer. At the Tiburon International Film Festival 2008 it won the Golden Reel Award for Best Director At the International Film Festival Syracuse, New York, 2008 (USA) it took cinematographer and the Jury Prize for production design, art direction & costumes.

In 2009 he produced the film “1” directed by Pater Sparrow, which was released at the 40th Hungarian Film Week where it was awarded for Cinematography, Artistic Contribution, Editor and by the Student’s Jury, First Film. At Granada it won the Audience Prize, in Fantasporto, Director’s Week it took Director and Actor awards.

== Theater ==
In 1992 Kamondi started to work in live theatre. In 1993 he was a founding member of the Pécs Experimental Workshop. He directed Crimes of the Heart, winning four prizes including Best Performance at the Hungarian Theatre Festival.

In 1994 he started to work in the Miskolc Theatre where he directed Salome, which won for Leading Actress at the Hungarian Theatre Festival.

In 1996 Kamondi founded his own experimental theatre company called 'Rolling Cult Motel' in Miskolc. The performance series "Touching Each Other" he started played for four years and was very well received both by the profession and the audience. One performance of the series won the Main Prizes of the Alternative Theatre Festival in 1999.

In 1998 Kamondi studied theatre life in London with the support of the British Council. At the invitation of the Dutch Theatre Institute he participated in the Theatre Festival in Amsterdam. In the same year, his own theatre company Rolling Cult Model produced Candide in the Thália Theatre, which received the Critics’ Award for “best musical performance of the season."

In 2010 he went back to the theatre and directed Almodóvar-Adamson's All About My Mother play in Víg Theatre, Budapest.

== Video ==
In 1996 his video film Golden Deck-Chair won for Director in the short film category at the 27th Hungarian Film Week. In the following year it received the Critics’ Award for “its innovative dimensions and forms".

== Documentary films ==
In 1997 he began shooting The Hungarian Speckled Variety, a documentary series, parts of which he completed. Critics considered the series one of the most important documentaries of the years after the political changes. One episode won the Main Prize in the Documentary Category in the Mediawawe International Short Film Festival in 1995.
