= Long Twilight =

1997 film by Attila Janisch

- Directed by: Attila Janisch
- Written by: Attila Janisch
- Starring: Mari Törőcsik
- Release date: 17 April 1997
- Running time: 70 minutes
- Country: Hungary
- Language: Hungarian

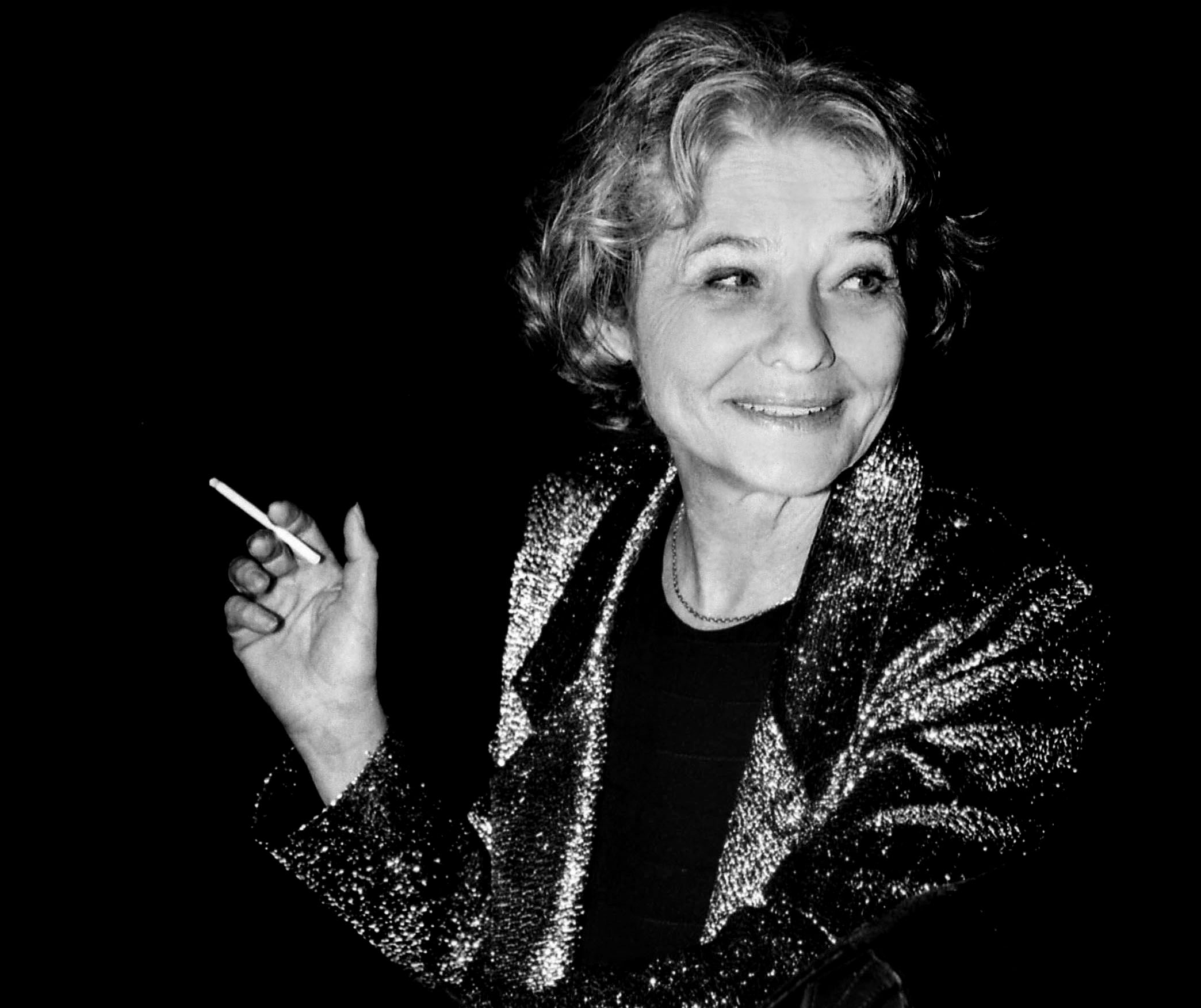
Mari Törőcsik, star of Long Twilight

Long Twilight (Hungarian: Hosszú alkony) is a 1997 Hungarian drama film directed by Attila Janisch. It was screened in the Contemporary World Cinema section of the 1997 Toronto International Film Festival.

== Cast ==
- Mari Törőcsik as öregasszony
- Imre Csuja as Buszsofõr
- András Fekete as Sofõr
- János Katona as Teherautósofõr
- Gábor Máté as Múzeumigazgató
- József Szarvas as útitárs
