= Out of Order (1997 film) =

- Directed by: András Kern; Róbert Koltai
- Starring: András Kern; Róbert Koltai
- Cinematography: Elemér Ragályi
- Release date: 11 December 1997
- Running time: 1h 45min
- Country: Hungary
- Language: Hungarian

Out of Order (Hungarian: A miniszter félrelép) is a 1997 Hungarian comedy film directed by András Kern and Róbert Koltai, based on the play of the same name by Ray Cooney.

== Plot ==
Minister Péter Vitt is having a secret sentimental encounter with Tünde Marosi, a beautiful woman who is also the opposition leader. But they discover a dead body in their hotel room.

== Cast ==
- András Kern - Péter Vitt
- Róbert Koltai - Sándor Galamb
- Sándor Gáspár - Béla Bakai
- Judit Hernádi - Bella Jakab
- Iván Kamarás - Róbert Marosi
- Ferenc Kállai - Hotel Manager
- Gábor Reviczky - József Rákóczi
- Dorottya Udvaros - Panni Vitt
- Kata Dobó - Tünde Marosi
- Zoltán Bezerédi - Extremist Politician

== Release ==
The film was the biggest box office success in Hungary between 1996 and 2014.
