= The Wondrous Voyage of Kornel Esti =

1995 film

- Directed by: József Pacskovszky
- Written by: Dezső Kosztolányi; József Pacskovszky
- Produced by: Andrea Kormos
- Starring: Gábor Máté
- Cinematography: Francisco Gózon
- Release date: 13 April 1995
- Running time: 99 minutes
- Country: Hungary
- Language: Hungarian

The Wondrous Voyage of Kornel Esti (Hungarian: Esti Kornél csodálatos utazása) is a 1995 Hungarian drama film directed by József Pacskovszky. It was entered into the 19th Moscow International Film Festival.

== Cast ==
- Gábor Máté as Esti Kornél
- Éva Igó as Editke mamája
- Gabriella Németh as Editke
- Gyula Benkő as Editke apja
- József Szarvas as Ábel
- Erika Marozsán as Woman from Vienna
- Olivér Csendes as Némafilmhõs
- Kathleen Gati as Bankárné
- Zsolt László as Ügyvéd
- Vera Pap as Kücsük anyja
- Edit Kormos as Kücsük
- Jenõ Kiss as Õrgróf
