= Woyzeck (1994 film) =

1994 film

- Film poster
- Directed by: János Szász
- Written by: János Szász; Georg Büchner (play)
- Starring: Lajos Kovács
- Release date: 24 February 1994
- Running time: 93 minutes
- Country: Hungary
- Language: Hungarian

Woyzeck is a 1994 Hungarian drama film co-written and directed by János Szász. The film was selected as the Hungarian entry for the Best Foreign Language Film at the 67th Academy Awards, but was not accepted as a nominee. It was adapted from the play of the same name by Georg Büchner.

== Cast ==
- Lajos Kovács as Woyzeck
- Diana Vacaru as Mari
- Éva Igó as Mari (voice)
- Aleksandr Porokhovshchikov as Kapitány
- Gábor Reviczky as Kapitány (voice)
- Péter Haumann as Orvos
- Sándor Gáspár as Policeman
- Sándor Varga as Fiú

== See also ==
- List of submissions to the 67th Academy Awards for Best Foreign Language Film
- List of Hungarian submissions for the Academy Award for Best Foreign Language Film
