= Enikő Eszenyi =

Hungarian actress (born 1961)

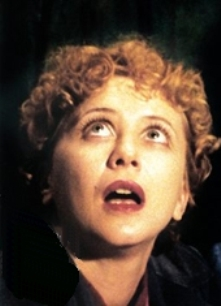
- Born: 11 January 1961 (age 65)
- Occupations: Actress; theater director

Enikő Eszenyi (born 11 January 1961) is a Hungarian actress and theater director, recipient of Kossuth Prize (2001). She appeared in 1991's Paths of Death and Angels.

== Selected filmography ==
- Night Rehearsal (1983)
- Eldorado (1988)
- The Pregnant Papa (1989)
- Paths of Death and Angels (1991)
- Kontroll (2003)
