= Ferenc Grunwalsky =

Hungarian filmmaker (1943–2025)

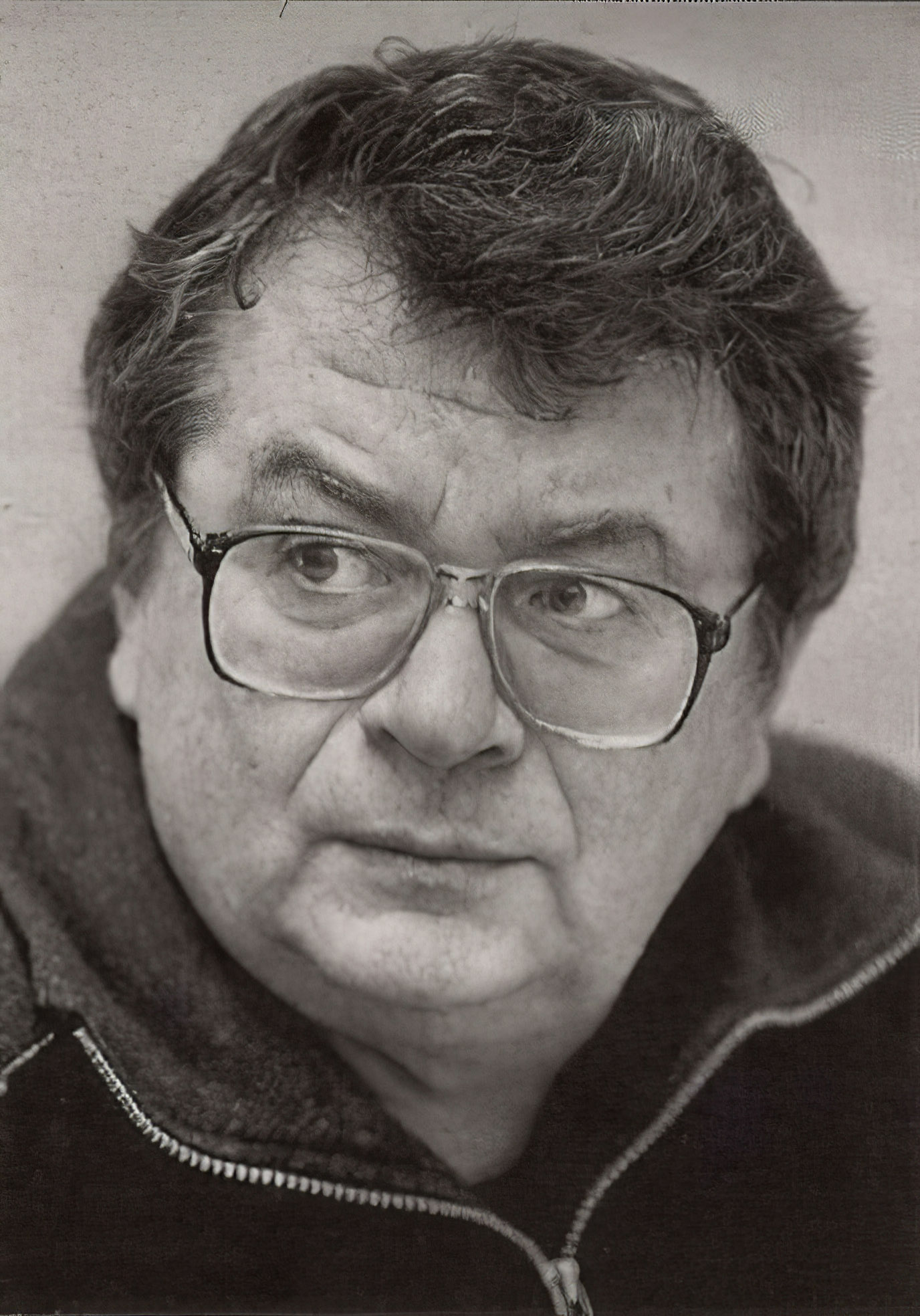
- Grunwalsky in 2003
- Born: Ferenc Grunwalsky; 16 May 1943; Budapest, Hungary
- Died: 30 June 2025 (aged 82)
- Occupations: Film director; Cinematographer; Screenwriter

Ferenc Grunwalsky (16 May 1943 – 30 June 2025) was a Hungarian film director, cinematographer, screenwriter and university professor.

== Life and career ==
Grunwalsky was born 16 May 1943 in Budapest, to Károly Grünwalsky (1912–1996), a Lutheran pastor and Iroska Laász (1912–1987). He attended the Eötvös Loránd University and the Academy of Theatre and Film Arts.

From 1968, he was a Director and Cinematographer at Mafilm. He was a member of the board of the Association of Hungarian Film Artists, and the president of the Hungarian Motion Picture Public Foundation (MMKK).

Throughout his career he directed a number of feature films, including Little but Tough (1989), and is credited as cinematographer on Tight Quarters (1983), amongst others.

Grunwalsky died on 30 June 2025, at the age of 82.
