= Night Rehearsal =

1983 film

- Directed by: Miklós Szurdi
- Written by: István Verebes; Miklós Szurdi
- Starring: Sándor Szakácsi
- Cinematography: András Szalai
- Release date: 24 March 1983
- Running time: 97 minutes
- Country: Hungary
- Language: Hungarian

Night Rehearsal (Hungarian: Hatásvadászok) is a 1983 Hungarian comedy film directed by Miklós Szurdi. It was entered into the 13th Moscow International Film Festival.

== Cast ==
- Sándor Szakácsi as Horkai Ádám
- Dorottya Udvaros as Andrea
- György Linka as Gál Szabó Endre
- Zsuzsa Töreky as Ica
- Enikő Eszenyi as Kati
- Tamás Végvári as Theatre Director
- Emese Balogh as Baba
- Erika Bodnár as Erika
- Kati Egri as Kriszta
- Márta Egri as Vajda Ági
- Athina Papadimitriu as Edit
