= Kontroll =

2003 film

- Kontroll film poster
- Directed by: Nimród Antal
- Written by: Jim Adler; Nimród Antal
- Produced by: Tamás Hutlassa
- Starring: Sándor Csányi; Zoltán Mucsi
- Cinematography: Gyula Pados
- Edited by: István Király
- Music by: Neo
- Distributed by: Budapest Film (Hungary); THINKFilm (United States)
- Release dates: November 20, 2003 (Hungary); April 1, 2005 (United States)
- Running time: 105 minutes
- Country: Hungary
- Language: Hungarian
- Budget: $800,000
- Box office: $1.3 million

Kontroll is a 2003 Hungarian comedy–thriller film. Shown internationally, mainly in art house theatres, the film is set on a fictionalized version of the Budapest Metro system. "Kontroll" in Hungarian refers to the ticket inspectors checking to ensure a rider has paid their fare. The story revolves around the ticket inspectors, riders, and a possible killer.

The film was written and directed by Nimród Antal and stars Sándor Csányi, Zoltán Mucsi, and Csaba Pindroch. The film was entered in a number of film festivals in Europe and North America. It won the Gold Hugo Award at the Chicago International Film Festival and was screened in the Un Certain Regard section at the 2004 Cannes Film Festival. It was also Hungary's submission for Best Foreign Language Film for the 2004 Academy Awards.

== Plot ==
Bulcsú (Sándor Csányi) is a ticket inspector on the underground; he spends his nights sleeping on the train platforms, and never leaves the underground. His ragtag team of inspectors – consisting of the veteran Professzor (Zoltán Mucsi), the disheveled Lecsó (Sándor Badár), neurotic narcoleptic Muki (Csaba Pindroch) and dimwitted greenhorn Tibi (Zsolt Nagy) – is routinely disrespected and assaulted by the commuters, who evade paying fines in a variety of ways.

One of Bulcsú's company rivals, model employee Gonzó (Balázs Mihályfi) challenges him to a "rail run": after the last metro leaves a station, the two get on the tracks and try to make it to the next station on foot before the midnight maintenance carriage runs them over. Bulcsú wins the contest, barely saving Gonzó who wets himself as a result of the run. During a routine inspection, he is enamored by a girl dressed in a bear suit called Zsófi (Eszter Balla), the daughter of one of the veteran metro drivers, Béla (Lajos Kovács). On another occasion, Bulcsú unsuccessfully attempts to calm his colleague Laci (László Nádasi) after Laci gets into an altercation with a passenger and takes him hostage; Laci says he cannot take it anymore and slits the passenger's throat.

After chasing a repeat offending prankster called Bootsie (Gyalogkakukk, lit. Road Runner in the Hungarian original; Bence Mátyássy), Bulcsú witnesses him being pushed on the tracks by a hooded figure, dressed in exactly the same attire as him; another incident in a long line of what people thought were suicides. Because of his recurring nightmare of this figure, Bulcsú fails to apprehend the murderer, and when he is questioned, he refuses to disclose details of the incident to the lead executive (György Cserhalmi) of the company. When the executive threatens to disclose the video footage of the incident, which only shows Bulcsú, he resigns his job. Muki later insinuates that Bulcsú is the murderer, citing his continual nightly absence and accusing him of having the same mental issues as Laci did; an infuriated Bulcsú almost pushes him on the tracks as well.

During an underground costume party, Bulcsú spots and follows the hooded figure and they get into an altercation, after which they start rail running similarly to the contest with Gonzó earlier. Bulcsú manages to outrun the hooded figure and escape the train. The hooded figure never emerges from the tracks. Bulcsú then meets Zsófi, who is now dressed as an angel, and the two finally emerge back to the surface.

== Cast ==
- Sándor Csányi as Bulcsú
- Zoltán Mucsi as Professor
- Csaba Pindroch as Muki
- Sándor Badár as Lecsó
- Zsolt Nagy as Tibi
- Bence Mátyássy as Bootsie
- Győző Szabó as Shadow
- Eszter Balla as Zsófi
- Lajos Kovács as Béla
- Enikő Eszenyi as drunk woman on the escalator

Film director Gábor Herendi has a cameo as the paramedic who shares a cooking recipe while collecting the remains of an accident victim.

== Production ==
Antal was influenced by Andrei Tarkovsky, Stanley Kubrick, Terry Gilliam, Martin Scorsese, and Takeshi Kitano.

== Reception ==
Rotten Tomatoes, a review aggregator, reports that 82% of 66 surveyed critics gave the film a positive review; the average rating is 7/10. The site's consensus reads: "Kontroll is a smart thriller that's dark, gritty, and funny." Metacritic rated it 72/100 based on 25 critics. American film critic Roger Ebert rated it 3.5/4 stars and wrote, "Antal has a feeling for action, but what distinguishes Kontroll is his control of characters and mood." Ebert compared the film's setting and atmosphere to that of a post-apocalyptic science fiction film.

== Legacy ==
On December 29, 2023 - the film's 20th anniversary - Bence Mátyássy, who played Bootsie in the original, released a fictional trailer for a sequel for "Kontroll 2", with Balla, Pindroch, Badár, Mucsi and Nagy reprising their roles, and Neo once again contributing the trailer score.

== See also ==
- List of Hungarian submissions for the Academy Award for Best Foreign Language Film
