= Lora (film) =

- Directed by: Gábor Herendi
- Starring: Lucia Brawley; Péter Nagy
- Release date: 25 January 2007
- Running time: 1h 56min
- Country: Hungary
- Language: Hungarian

Lora is a 2007 Hungarian drama film directed by Gábor Herendi.
