= Anna Kubik =

Hungarian actress (born 1957)

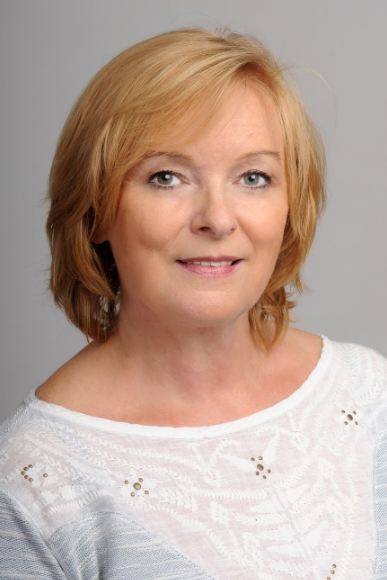
- Born: 8 January 1957 (age 69); Ősi, Hungary
- Education: University of Theatre and Film Arts in Budapest
- Occupation: Actress
- Years active: 1973–present

Anna Kubik (born 8 January 1957) is a Hungarian actress.

== Career ==
Anna Kubik graduated from the University of Theatre and Film Arts in Budapest in 1981, studying under Károly Kazimir and István Iglódi. She then joined the National Theatre, and from 1991 she became an artist of the Budapest Chamber Theatre. Later she was at the Művész Theatre and the Thália Theatre. Kubik was again contracted by the National Theatre in 1999, and in 2000 by the Pest Hungarian Theatre, where she remained until 2013. From 2002 she was a guest artist in many performances of the new National Theatre. That same year she was invited to play at the Vörösmarty Theatre in Székesfehérvár and Anna Ráckevei at the Csokonai National Theatre in Debrecen, of which she was a member until 2022. She holds poetry camps for high school students in Székelyföld.

She has been Chairman of the Board of Trustees of the István Bubik Award since 2005. On 5 November 2025, she was elected as the nation's artist, replacing Károly Mécs, who died in February.

== Filmography ==
- My First Two Hundred Years (1984)
- March of the Penguins (2005)
- Tales from the Lakeside (2017)
- Willy and the Guardians of the Lake (2018)
