= Sándor Gáspár (actor) =

Hungarian actor

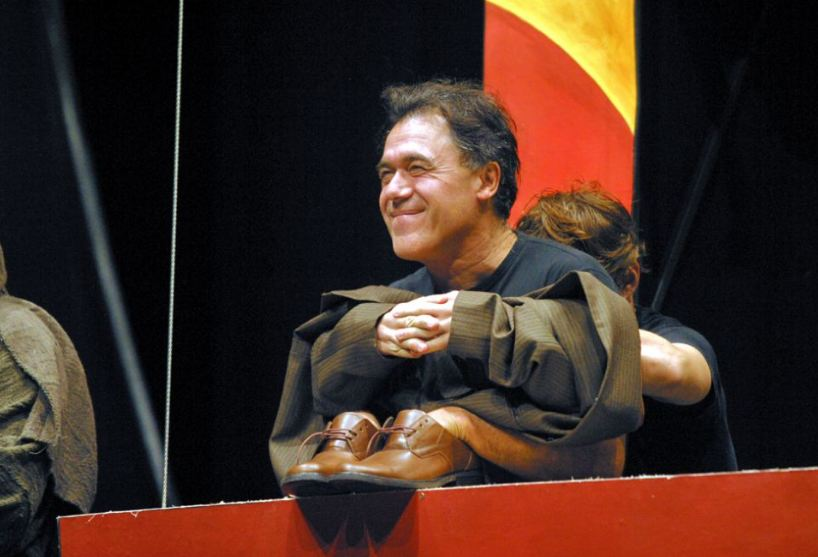
- Kaiser Ottó, 2017
- Born: 9 April 1956 (age 70); Szentes, Hungary
- Occupation: Actor
- Years active: 1978-present

Sándor Gáspár (born 9 April 1956) is a Hungarian actor. He appeared in more than seventy films since 1978. His brother Tibor Gáspár is also an actor.

== Selected filmography ==
Year	Title	Role	Notes
1987	Love, Mother	Doki	
1989	Little but Tough	Bogár Pál	
1990	Memories of a River	Herskó Dávid	
1994	Woyzeck	Policeman	
1997	Out of Order	Bela Bakai	
2001	Glass Tiger	Róka	
2008	Delta		
