= A Kind of America =

- Hungarian Poster
- Directed by: Gábor Herendi
- Written by: Gábor Herendi; Gyula Márton
- Produced by: Gábor Herendi; Gábor Kálomista
- Starring: Tibor Szervét; Csaba Pindroch; Győző Szabó; Eszter Ónodi; Szonja Oroszlán; Ferenc Hujber; Ila Schütz; Gabriella Hámori
- Cinematography: Jordi Reixach
- Edited by: István Király
- Music by: Gábor Pálvölgyi
- Release date: 31 January 2002 (Hungary)
- Running time: 115 minutes
- Country: Hungary
- Language: Hungarian

A Kind of America (Hungarian: Valami Amerika) is a Hungarian comedy film from 2002.

== Plot ==
Three brothers Ákos, András, and Tamás live in Budapest. Tamás is a director of video clips and commercials, but dreams of directing a feature film. He has written a script with the title 'The Guilty City', but has trouble financing the project. At his surprise, he receives an email from an American film producer named Alex Brubeck, who writes that he likes the script. Offering to pay half the budget, he wants to meet Tamás personally in Budapest to talk things through. With the help of his brothers Ákos, a successful manager and sex addict, and András, a failed poet, he does everything to impress the American producer.

== Reception ==
The film was a box office success in Hungary.
