= Paths of Death and Angels =

1991 film

- Film poster
- Directed by: Zoltán Kamondi
- Written by: Zoltán Kamondi
- Produced by: János Dömölky; Gábor Hanák
- Starring: Enikő Eszenyi
- Cinematography: Gábor Medvigy
- Edited by: Mari Miklós
- Release date: May 1991
- Running time: 114 minutes
- Country: Hungary
- Language: Hungarian

Paths of Death and Angels (Hungarian: Halálutak és angyalok) is a 1991 Hungarian drama film directed by Zoltán Kamondi. It was screened in the Un Certain Regard section at the 1991 Cannes Film Festival.

== Cast ==
- Enikő Eszenyi - Ilona
- Rudolf Hrušínský - Schrevek József
- Gregory Hlady - Schrevek István (as Grigorij Gladyij)
- István Dégi - Árpi
- Gábor Reviczky - Boldizsár Tamás és Nagy Károly
- Eszter Csákányi
- Frigyes Hollósi
- Edit Illés - Jolán
- Anikó Für - Gina
