= Géza M. Tóth =

Hungarian filmmaker (born 1970)

Géza M. Tóth (born 16 June 1970) is a Hungarian filmmaker, producer and animator. Academy Award-nominated Hungarian film director and producer. Founder and director of KEDD Animation Studio. University professor.

== Career ==
=== As a Filmmaker ===
As a director, producer, and production designer, he is the creator of independent short films, children's animations, theatre and opera productions, as well as educational films.

His works have successfully featured in over 250 international film festivals, winning nearly 120 awards. His debut work, The Rat Catcher (Patkányfogó, 1992), premiered in the competition program of the Annecy International Animation Film Festival. His 1996 film Icarus (Ikarosz) was screened at the Berlin International Film Festival (Berlinale), while his 2005 animated short film Maestro was nominated for the 79th Academy Awards in the Best Animated Short Film category.

His work as a director and producer encompasses theatre and opera productions (e.g. XYZ, The Miraculous Mandarin, Bluebeard's Castle, The Wooden Prince, St Matthew Passion, and Wagner's Der Ring des Nibelungen tetralogy), children's films and animated series (e.g. Berry and Dolly, The Kuflis, Boribon's Tales, Humming, Tales of Nasreddin Hodja, MITCH-MATCH), as well as educational films (The History of Opera in Hungary, Opera130). Numerous children's books have been published with his illustrations (e.g. What Nature Teaches Us, Kobak Books, Barni in Berlin).

=== As a Professor ===
He is a habilitated university professor holding a DLA in Arts and a PhD in Educational Sciences, since 1994.

Between 1994 and 1998, he taught at the Pető András Institute for Conductive Education, from 1994 to 2010 at the Moholy-Nagy University of Art and Design (MOME, formerly MIE/MIF), and from 2010 to 2020 at the University of Theatre and Film Arts (SZFE). At MOME, he led the Animation Department from 1995 to 2005, and at SZFE, he headed the MA Program in Production Design from 2010 to 2020. From 2014 to 2019, he served as Rector of the University of Theatre and Film Arts.

As a guest lecturer, he has taught at several international art universities, including the Royal College of Art in London, Filmakademie Ludwigsburg, and the National Institute of Design in India. Since 2018, he has been a university professor at the Institute of Hungarian Film and Media at Babeș–Bolyai University in Cluj-Napoca.

He is a member of the Academy of Motion Picture Arts and Sciences, and the International Academy of Television Arts and Sciences.

=== Founder and director of KEDD Animation Studio ===
In 2002, he founded KEDD Animation Studio. The Budapest-based studio creates and distributes high-quality artistic animation and children's content. Over the years, it has evolved into a complex, multi-faceted animation enterprise.

The studio's scope of activities includes the in-house production of animated content (short films and series), participation in international co-productions, international distribution, as well as the development, management, and commercialization of proprietary children's IPs (intellectual properties). Additionally, the studio operates its own AVOD and YouTube network for the distribution of children's and animated content, which is currently the third most viewed hungarian Youtube channel for kids.

Since 2011, the studio has been annually organizing the National Animation Festival (Országos Rajzfilmünnep), one of Hungary's most popular film events.

== Film, Television, and Theater Works ==
=== Short Animated Films ===
- 2019: MATCHES – animated short film (writer, director, producer)
  - Moscow Shorts International Short Film Festival, 2019 (Best Animated Short Film)
  - Best Shorts Competition, 2019 (Special Award for Excellence in Animation)
  - New York City Short Film Festival, 2019 (Best Animation)
  - ANIMANIMA International Animation Festival, 2019 (Audience Award, Best Children's Film Category)
  - London International Animation Festival, 2019 (Audience Award, Best Children's Film Category)
  - Seven Hills Film Festival, 2019 (Main Prize)
  - ETIUDA&ANIMA International Film Festival, 2019 (Honorable Mention)
  - OTTAWA International Animation Festival, 2019 (Honorable Mention)
  - Fano International Film Festival, 2019 (Best Animated Film)
  - Foyle Film Festival, 2019 (Light in Motion Award, Best Animated Short Film Category)
  - Athens Animfest International Animation Film Festival, 2020 (3rd Place)
  - Alexandre Trauner Art/Film Festival, 2020 (2nd Place, Fine Arts Film Category)
- 2013: YES – short film (writer, director)
  - 10th Golden Eye Cinematographer Festival, Budapest, 2013 (Golden Eye Award – Short Fiction Category)
- 2012: Mr. Dokker – animated short film (producer)
- 2012: Egyszálgyufa (Matchstick) – animated short film (writer, director, producer)
- 2009: MAMA – animated short film (writer, director, producer)
  - Trieste Maremetraggio Film Festival, 2010 (CEI Award)
  - 40th Hungarian Film Week, 2009 (Special Award for Short Fiction, Student Jury Special Award)
  - BUSHO Short Film Festival, 2009 (Special Award)
  - International FilmFest Braunschweig, 2009 (Best Music)
  - International Film Festival Etiuda et Anima, 2009 (Best Director)
  - Anilogue, 2009 (Special Jury Award)
- 2008: ERGO – animated short film (writer, director, producer)
  - Mogilev Animaevka, 2010 (Best Experimental Film)
  - Asolo Filmfest, 2010 (Best Music Award)
  - Anifest Rozafa Film Festival, 2010 (Best Sound Award)
  - PATRAS Film Festival, 2010 (Best Animation Award)
  - Weimar BACKUP Film Festival, 2010 (Special Award)
  - Ojai-Ventura Film Festival, 2009 (Main Prize)
  - BKKIAF – Bangkok International Animation Film Festival, 2009 (Jury Grand Prize)
  - Kecskemét Animation Film Festival (KAFF), 2009 (Special Award)
  - Animation Block Party, 2009 (Main Prize)
  - FCAN – Short Animation Film Festival, 2008 (Main Prize)
  - ANIMANIMA, 2008 (Best Sound Award)
  - Sarajevo IFF, 2008 (Special Award)
  - Cannes Film Festival, Semaine de la Critique, 2008 (In Competition)
  - Berlin, opening performance of Collegium Hungaricum, 2008
  - Ottawa International Animation Festival, 2009
  - Anima Mundi, 2009
  - Warsaw International Film Festival, 2009
- 2005: MAESTRO – animated short film (writer, director, producer)
  - Academy of Motion Picture Arts and Sciences, Academy Award nomination, 2007
  - Évora FIKE 2007 – International Short Film Festival, 2007 (Audience Award)
  - Kawasaki Digital Short Film Festival, 2007 (Main Prize)
  - Lucania Film Festival, 2007 (Grand Prize for Animation)
  - Sardinia Film Festival, 2007 (Best Short Film Award)
  - NAFF Neum International Film Festival, 2007 (Main Prize)
  - Semana de Cine de Medina del Campo Film Festival, 2007 (Special Award)
  - Smiths Falls River and Rails International Film Festival, 2006 (Best Short Film Award)
  - St. Petersburg MULTIVISION Festival, 2006 (Best Short Film Award)
  - Stuttgart ULRICH-SCHIEGG Film Festival, 2006 (Special Award)
  - Trieste Maremetraggio Film Festival, 2006 (CEI Award)
  - Volgograd VIDEOLOGIA International Film Festival, 2006 (Audience Award)
  - Weimar BACKUP Film Festival, 2006 (Audience Award)
  - Zlín International Film Festival for Children and Youth, 2006 (Hermína Týrlová Award)
  - Las Palmas CANARIAS MEDIAFEST06, 2006 (Best Animated Film Award)
  - Leeds International Film Festival, 2006 (Honorary Mention)
  - Gifu HIAFFF Film Festival, 2006 (Shared Main Prize)
  - Reggio Film Festival, 2006 (Jury Award)
  - Rome CORTOONS Festival, 2006 (Best Short Film Award)
  - Sancy PLEIN LA BOBINE Film Festival, 2006 (Children's Jury Main Prize)
  - Huesca International Film Festival, 2006 (Special Award)
  - Budapest BUSHO, 2006 (Grand Prize for Animation, Student Jury Mention)
  - Campobasso THE LAND OF THE LIVING SHORTS, 2006 (Best Short Film Award, Audience Award)
  - Athens International Panorama of Independent Film Makers, 2006 (Best Animated Film Award)
  - Aubagne International Film Festival, 2005 (Best Animated Film Award, Audience Award)
  - Les Nuits Magiques International Animation Film Festival, Bègles, 2005 (Best Short Film Award)
  - Belgrade BALKANIMA International Animated Film Festival, 2005 (Special Award)
  - Belo Horizonte ISFF, 2005 (Best Screenplay Award)
  - Budapest AniFest3, 2005 (Special Award, Audience Award)
  - Budapest MAFSZ, 2005 (Special Award)
  - Bucharest DaKINO International Film Festival, 2005 (Special Award)
  - Changzhou CICDAF International Animation Film Festival, 2005 (Best Short Film Award)
  - Córdoba ANIMACOR, 2005 (2nd Best Short Film Award)
  - Espinho CINANIMA International Animated Film Festival, 2005 (Audience Award)
  - Izmir International Short Film Festival, 2005 (Golden Cat Main Prize)
  - Kecskemét Animation Film Festival, KAFF, 2005 (Special Award)
  - Miskolc CineFest, 2005 (Best Animated Film Award)
  - Montreal GLITCH Film Festival, 2005 (Special Award)
  - Annecy International Animation Film Festival, 2005 (In Competition)
  - Nagoya JDAF Film Festival, 2005 (Nagoya Chamber of Commerce & Industry Special Award)
  - Naoussa International Film Festival, 2006 (Special Award)
  - Patras International Film Festival, 2006 (Grand Prize for Animation)
  - Trenčianske Teplice Art Film Festival, 2005 (Special Award)
  - Würzburg Internationales Film Wochenende, 2005 (Short Film Special Award)
  - Pécs Motion Picture Festival, 2005 (Special Award)
- 1996: Ikarosz (Icarus) – animated short film (writer, director, production designer)
  - Augsburg International Independent Film Festival, 1997 (Main Prize)
  - Dresden International Animation and Short Film Festival, 1998 (Special Award)
  - "KROK-97" Film Festival, Kyiv, 1997 (Special Award)
  - Hungarian Feature Film Week, 1997 (Opening Film)
  - Berlin International Film Festival, 1997 (In Competition)
- 1994: Falrajárók (Wall Walkers) – animated short film (writer, director, production designer)
  - Kecskemét Animation Film Festival, 1996
- 1992: Patkányfogó (The Rat Catcher) – animated short film (writer, director, production designer)
  - Annecy International Animation Film Festival, 1993 (In Competition)
  - Stuttgart International Festival of Animated Film, 1994 (In Competition)

=== Animated Feature Films ===
- 2025: Bogyó és Babóca 7. – Mesék a pöttyös házból (Berry and Dolly 7 – Tales from the Polka Dot House) – animated film (co-director, producer)
- 2024: Bogyó és Babóca 6. – Csengettyűk (Berry and Dolly 6 – Bells) – animated film (co-director, producer)
- 2023: Bogyó és Babóca 5. – Hónapok meséi (Berry and Dolly 5 – Tales of the Months) – animated film (co-director, producer)
- 2021: A kuflik és az Akármi (The Kuflis and the Anything) – animated film (producer)
- 2020: Bogyó és Babóca 4. – Tündérkártyák (Berry and Dolly 4 – Fairy Cards) – animated film (co-director, producer)
- 2019: Mi újság, kuflik? (What's Up, Kuflis?) – animated film (co-director, producer)
- 2017: Egy kupac kufli (A Heap of Kuflis) – animated film (director, producer)
- 2014: Bogyó és Babóca 3. – Játszótársak (Berry and Dolly 3 – Playmates) – animated film (co-director, producer)
- 2011: Bogyó és Babóca 2. – 13 Új mese (Berry and Dolly 2 – 13 New Tales) – animated film (co-director, producer)
- 2010: Bogyó és Babóca 1. – 13 Mese (Berry and Dolly 1 – 13 Tales) – animated feature film (co-director, producer)

=== Series ===
- 2025: Bogyó és Babóca (Berry and Dolly) (Season 7) – animated series (co-director, producer)
- 2024: Bogyó és Babóca (Berry and Dolly) (Season 6) – animated series (co-director, producer)
- 2023: Bogyó és Babóca (Berry and Dolly) (Season 5) – animated series (co-director, producer)
- 2023: Boribon (12 episodes) – animated series (co-director, producer)
- 2021: MITCH-MATCH (Seasons 1–4) – animated series (writer, director, producer)
  - Seven Hills Film Festival, 2020 (1st Place, Other Film Category)
- 2021: Naszreddin Hodzsa meséi (Tales of Nasreddin Hodja) (Seasons 1–4) – animated series (producer)
- 2021: Kuflik (The Kuflis) (Season 3) – animated series (producer)
- 2020: Bogyó és Babóca (Berry and Dolly) (Season 4) – animated series (co-director, producer)
- 2020: Dúdoló (Humming) (Seasons 5–8) – animated series (producer)
- 2019: Kuflik (The Kuflis) (Season 2) – animated series (co-director, producer)
- 2019: Detti és Drót (Detti and Wire) (3 episodes) – animated series (producer)
- 2018: Miezmiaz? (Whatisthat?) (16 episodes) – animated series (co-director, producer)
- 2016: Kuflik (The Kuflis) (Season 1) – animated series (co-director, producer)
- 2015: Paprika és Rózsa (Paprika and Rose) (120 episodes) – animated series (producer)
- 2014: Bogyó és Babóca (Berry and Dolly) (Season 3) – animated series (co-director, producer)
- 2014: KEDDvencek (KEDDFavourites) – puppet series (producer)
- 2011: Bogyó és Babóca (Berry and Dolly) (Season 2) – animated series (co-director, producer)
  - 11th China International Children's Film Festival, 2011 (Best Short Film Award for the episode "The Cricket's Violin")
  - 11th Kecskemét Animation Film Festival, 2013 (Award of the Kecskemét Micro-region Settlements for the episode "The Balloon")
- 2010: Bogyó és Babóca (Berry and Dolly) (Season 1) – animated series (co-director and producer)
- 2009: TESPI Mesék sorozat (TESPI Tales) (Episode 1) – animated series (director, producer)
  - Kecskemét Animation Film Festival, KAFF, 2009 (The episode "Irritated Economy" in competition)
- 2008: Modern képmesék (Modern Picture Tales) (80 episodes) – animated series for Hungarian Television (series director and production manager)

=== Multidisciplinary and Theater Works ===
- 2022: Az istenek alkonya (Götterdämmerung) – opera production (director, production designer)
  - premiere: May 15, 2022, Hungarian State Opera (completing Géza M. Tóth's production of Richard Wagner's Ring tetralogy at the Hungarian State Opera)
- 2017: Siegfried – opera production (director, production designer)
  - premiere: March 19, 2017, Hungarian State Opera
- 2016: Bartók Maraton (Bartók Marathon) – A fából faragott királyfi (The Wooden Prince), A csodálatos mandarin (The Miraculous Mandarin), A kékszakállú herceg vára (Duke Bluebeard's Castle) – multidisciplinary production (director, production designer), Miskolc Opera Festival
- 2016: Walkür (Die Walküre) – opera production (director, production designer)
  - premiere: March 3, 2016, Hungarian State Opera
- 2015: A Rajna kincse (Das Rheingold) – opera production (director, production designer)
  - premiere: March 19, 2015, Hungarian State Opera
- 2014: Opera130 – A Sugár úti palota (Opera130 – The Palace on Sugár Avenue) – documentary film (writer, director, producer)
  - premiere: September 27, 2014, Hungarian State Opera
- 2014: A láthatatlan erőd (The Invisible Fortress) – documentary film (producer)
- 2014: Szabadság tér '89 (Freedom Square '89) (103 episodes) – animated segments for an educational TV series commissioned by Hungarian Television (series director, producer)
- 2013: 7 Jeles Nap (7 Special Days) (7 episodes) – multidisciplinary series commissioned by the Hungarian State Opera (writer, director, producer)
- 2013: A magyar operajátszás története (The History of Hungarian Opera Performing) – documentary film (writer, director, producer)
- 2013: Máté-Passió (St Matthew Passion) – semi-staged opera production (director, production designer) premiere: March 28, 2013, Hungarian State Opera, featuring the MR Choir and the Danubia Orchestra Óbuda (Conductor: György Vashegyi)
- 2012: Lieb Ferenc, az edelényi festő (Ferenc Lieb, Painter of Edelény) – historical short feature film (writer, director, producer)
- 2006: A Kékszakállú herceg vára (Duke Bluebeard's Castle) – multidisciplinary production (director, production designer)
- 2006: A Csodálatos Mandarin (The Miraculous Mandarin) – multidisciplinary production (director, production designer)
- 1998: XYZ – multidisciplinary production (writer, co-director, production designer)
