= Gábor Máté (actor) =

Hungarian actor and film director (born 1955)

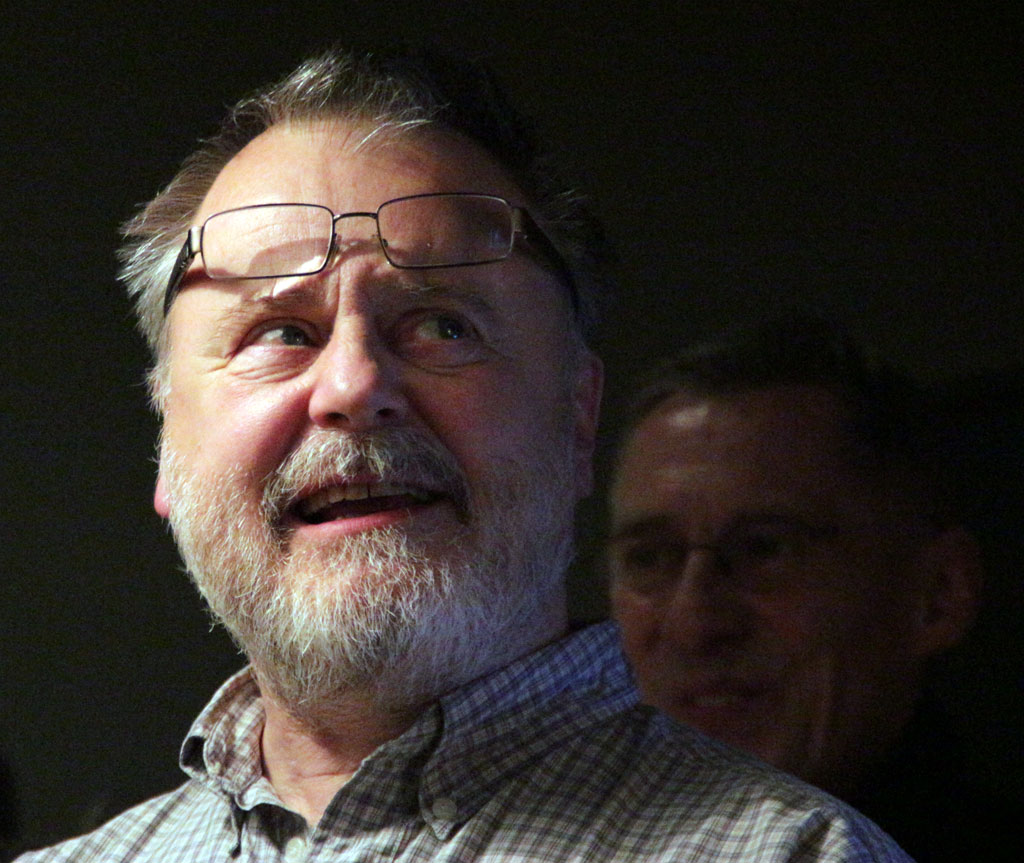
- Máté in 2015
- Born: 29 April 1955 (age 71); Budapest, Hungary
- Occupation: Actor
- Years active: 1976-present

Gábor Máté (born 29 April 1955) is a Hungarian actor and film director. He appeared in more than seventy films since 1976.

== Selected filmography ==
Year	Title	Role	Notes
1989	Before the Bat's Flight Is Done	László	
1989	Sentenced to Death	Wágner Sándor	
1989	My 20th Century	K	
1992	Sweet Emma, Dear Böbe	Officer	
1993	We Never Die	Imre	
1993	Whoops		
1995	The Wondrous Voyage of Kornel Esti	Esti Kornel	
1997	Long Twilight		
2003	Happy Birthday!		
2006	Taxidermia	Öreg Balatony Kálmán	
2008	Virtually a Virgin	Dr. Gyülevészi	
