= Zoltán Mucsi =

Hungarian film actor

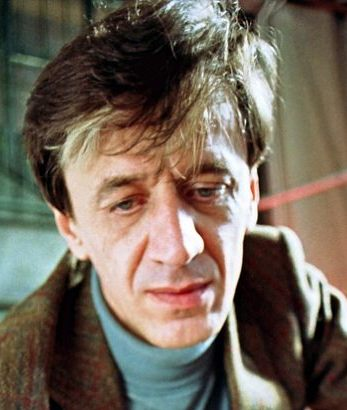
- Born: September 9, 1957 (age 68); Abony, Hungary
- Other names: Kapa (literally hoe)
- Occupation: Actor
- Years active: 1979–

Zoltán Mucsi (born 8 September 1957 in Abony) is a Hungarian actor. He has appeared in more than sixty films since his debut in 1983.

Zoltán Mucsi was born in Abony, and in his childhood, he originally wanted to be a footballer. In 1979 he joined to the Szigligeti Theatre in Szolnok as assistant actor. He tried to apply to the Academy of Dramatic Art several times, unsuccessfully. From 1995 he was a freelance actor, and since 1997 he has been a member of the Bárka Theater. Later he also joined the Krétakör Theatre in 2002. His famous movie role was in Miklós Jancsó's The Lord's Lantern in Budapest (1999) as Kapa. He also appeared in movies like Sweet Emma, Dear Böbe (1992) directed by István Szabó, Kontroll (2003) directed by Nimród Antal and Tinker Tailor Soldier Spy (2011) directed by Tomas Alfredson.

== Selected filmography ==
Year	Title	Role	Director
2021-	Mintaapák (series)	Mátyás Kovács (supporting role)	Áron Mátyássy
2020	Unfinished Business	Head of the National Theatre	
2019	Lives Recurring	Michael Korsós	István Tasnádi
2018	Open	Man on the Bus	Orsi Nagypál
2017-19	Tóth János (series)	János Tóth (lead role)	Orsi Nagypál
2017	Budapest Noir	Vogel	Éva Gárdos
2017	Jupiter's Moon	Pincér	Kornél Mundruczó
2013	Coming Out	Pécsák	Dénes Orosz
2012-17	Work Matters (series)	János Tóth (lead role)	István Márton
2011	Tinker Tailor Soldier Spy	Hungarian	Tomas Alfredson
2009	Paperdogs	Kuplung	Bence Gyöngyössy
2009	1	Phil Pitch	Pater Sparrow
2008	Tableau	Lieutenant Zafír	Gábor Dettre
2007	Boys of the Sun Street	Head of the Party	György Szomjas
2007	Buhera mátrix	Vizes	István Márton
2006	One fool makes a hundred	Kuplung	Bence Gyöngyössy
2004	Hungarian Vagabond	Tatár	
2003	Kontroll	Professor	Nimród Antal
2000	Mother! The Mosquitoes	Kapa	Miklós Jancsó
1999	The Lord's Lantern in Budapest	Kapa	Miklós Jancsó
1992	Sweet Emma, Dear Böbe	Szilárd	István Szabó
1990	Memories of a River	Jakob	Judit Elek
1989	Little but Tough	Juszuf	Ferenc Grunwalsky
