= Gábor Herendi =

Hungarian film director (born 1960)

- Born: 2 December 1960 (age 65); Budapest, Hungary
- Occupations: Film director, film producer
- Years active: 2002–present

Gábor Herendi (born 2 December 1960) is a Hungarian film director.

== Filmography ==
- Valami Amerika (2002)
- Magyar vándor (2004)
- Lora (2007)
- Valami Amerika 2. (2008)
- Kincsem — Bet on Revenge (2017)
- Valami Amerika 3. (2018)
- Toxikoma (2021)
- Bűnös város (2021)
