= We Never Die =

1993 film

- Directed by: Róbert Koltai
- Written by: Gabor Nogradi; Róbert Koltai
- Starring: Róbert Koltai
- Release date: 15 January 1993
- Running time: 95 minutes
- Country: Hungary
- Languages: Hungarian; Hebrew

We Never Die (Hungarian: Sose halunk meg) is a 1993 Hungarian comedy film written by, directed and starring Róbert Koltai. The film was selected as the Hungarian entry for the Best Foreign Language Film at the 66th Academy Awards, but was not accepted as a nominee.

== Plot summary ==
The story is set in the 1960s and is about a traveling coat hanger salesman who educates his teenage nephew about life through their travels.

== Cast ==
- Róbert Koltai as Gyula
- Mihály Szabados as Imi
- Gábor Máté as Imre
- Tamás Jordán as Vigéc
- Kathleen Gati as Nusi
- Andor Lukáts as Pap
- György Hunyadkürthy as Pucus
- Péter Blaskó as Apa
- Flóra Kádár

== See also ==
- List of submissions to the 66th Academy Awards for Best Foreign Language Film
- List of Hungarian submissions for the Academy Award for Best Foreign Language Film
