= Allegro barbaro (film) =

1979 film

- Directed by: Miklós Jancsó
- Starring: György Cserhalmi; Zsuzsa Czinkóczi; Georgiana Tarjan; Lajos Balázsovits; István Kovács; István Bujtor; Bertalan Solti; László Horváth; József Madaras; Gábor Koncz; Sándor Kátó
- Release date: 11 October 1979
- Running time: 73 minutes
- Country: Hungary
- Language: Hungarian

Allegro barbaro is a 1979 Hungarian drama film directed by Miklós Jancsó.The film starring György Cserhalmi, Zsuzsa Czinkóczi, Lajos Balázsovits, Georgiana Tarjan, István Kovács in the lead roles.

"Hungarian Rhapsody and Allegro Barbaro (both 1978) formed the first two parts of an uncompleted trilogy on the life of a nationalist executed in 1944 for his involvement in an anti-Hitler plot. Both were judged too parochial to travel abroad." Allegro Barbaro is thus considered to be part II of the director's Hungarian Trilogy.

== Cast ==
- György Cserhalmi as Zsadányi István
- Zsuzsa Czinkóczi as Bankós Mari
- Georgiana Tarjan as Tarján Györgyi
- Lajos Balázsovits as Zsadányi Gábor
- István Kovács as Komár István gróf
- István Bujtor as Hédervári
- Bertalan Solti as Öreg Bankós
- László Horváth as Kovács

== Analysis ==
The title refers to a musical piece of the same name by Béla Bartók, that was extensively used in the soundtrack of another film by the same director, Elektra.
