= Miklós Jancsó =

Hungarian film director and screenwriter (1921–2014)

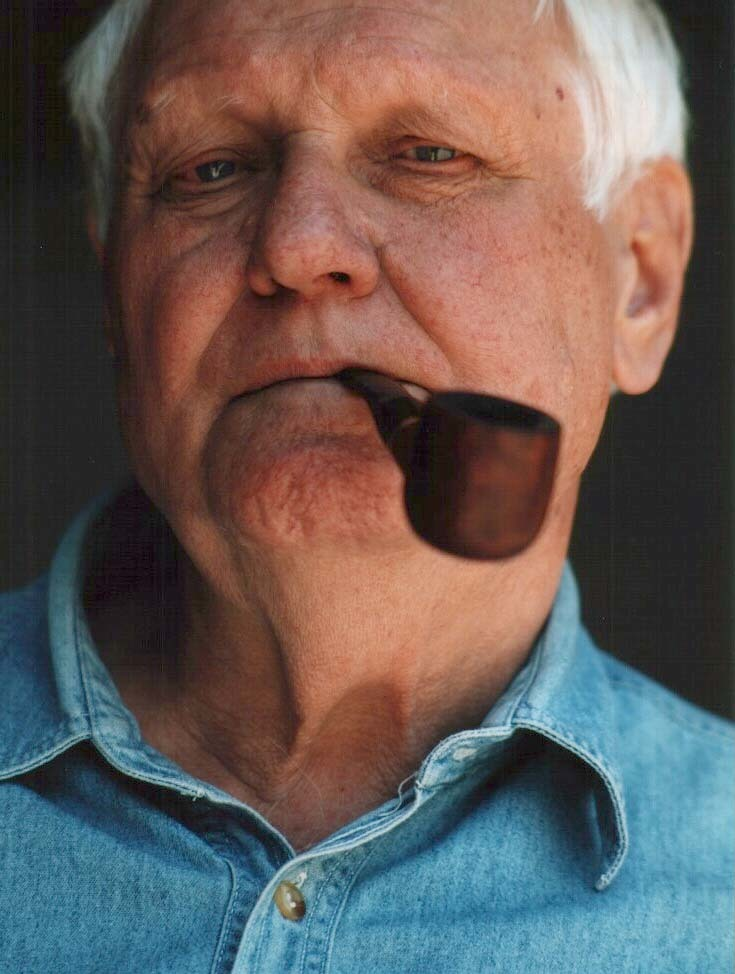
- Jancsó at his home, 2000
- Born: 27 September 1921; Vác, Hungary
- Died: 31 January 2014 (aged 92); Budapest, Hungary
- Occupations: Film director, screenwriter, producer, actor
- Years active: 1950–2014
- Spouse(s): Katalin Wowesznyi (1949–1958); Márta Mészáros (1958–1968); Zsuzsa Csákány (1981–2014; his death)
- Children: Dávid Jancsó

Miklós Jancsó (Hungarian: [ˈmikloːʃ ˈjɒnt͡ʃoː]; 27 September 1921 – 31 January 2014) was a Hungarian film director and screenwriter. Jancsó achieved international prominence starting in the mid-1960s with works including The Round-Up (Szegénylegények, 1965), The Red and the White (Csillagosok, katonák, 1967), and Red Psalm (Még kér a nép, 1972).

Jancsó's films are characterized by long takes, historical and/or rural settings, and the recurring theme of the abuse of power. His works are often allegorical commentaries on Hungary under Communism and Soviet occupation, although some critics prefer to stress the universal dimensions of Jancsó's explorations. Towards the end of the 1960s and especially into the 1970s, Jancsó's work became increasingly stylized and overtly symbolic.

== Early life ==
Miklós Jancsó was born to a Hungarian father, Sándor Jancsó and a Romanian mother, Angela Poparada. After graduation he studied law in Pécs, receiving his degree in Kolozsvár in 1944. He also took courses in art history and ethnography, which he continued to study in Transylvania. After graduating, Jancsó served in World War II and was briefly a prisoner of war. He registered with the legal Bar but avoided a legal career.

After the war, Jancsó enrolled in the Academy of Theatre and Film Arts in Budapest. He received his Diploma in Film Directing in 1950. Around this time Jancsó began working on newsreel footage and reported on such subjects as May Day celebrations, agricultural harvests and state visits from Soviet dignitaries.

== Career ==
=== 1950s ===
Jancsó first started directing films in 1954 by making documentary newsreels. Between 1954 and 1958 he made newsreel shorts whose subjects ranged from a portrait of Hungarian writer Zsigmond Móricz in 1955 to the official Chinese state visit in 1957. Although these films do not reflect Jancsó's aesthetic development, they gave the director the opportunity to master the technical side of film-making while also enabling him to travel around Hungary and see firsthand what was happening there.

In 1958, he completed his first full-length feature film, The Bells Have Gone to Rome, which starred Miklós Gábor. In the film a group of Hungarian schoolboys are pressured to join the army by Nazi Germans and fight against the Russians on the eastern front. As the schoolboys begin to learn about and understand the Nazi regime, they reject the Germans offer. Jancsó now dismisses this early work.

Jancsó then returned to documentary film-making, including a collaboration with his wife Márta Mészáros. In 1959 he met Hungarian author Gyula Hernádi, who collaborated on Jancsó's films until his death in 2005.

=== 1960s ===
After contributing to the film Három csillag with Zoltán Várkonyi and Károly Wiedermann in 1960, Jancsó's next feature film was Cantata (Oldás és kötés) in 1963. The film starred Zoltán Latinovits and Andor Ajtay, and was written by Jancsó from a short story by József Lengyel. In the film Latinovits plays a young doctor with humble roots who grows tired of his more intellectual life and career as a surgeon in Budapest. He decides to revisit his place of birth: his father's farm in the Hungarian plains and is affected by the connection to nature that he had forgotten in the city. He meets his former teacher, who reminds him of long forgotten childhood memories. In the end Latinovits learns to appreciate both his easy life in the city and the country life of his youth that made it all possible. The film received mixed reviews from film critics in Hungary, but won a prize from the Hungarian Critics Circle.

Jancsó's next film was My Way Home (Így jöttem), released in 1964. It was his first collaboration with screenwriter Gyula Hernádi and starred András Kozák and Sergei Nikonenko. In the film Kozák plays Jozak, a teenaged deserter of Hungary's Nazi-run army at the end of World War II. He is twice captured by the Red Army, where he is put in charge of watching over a flock of sheep. There he befriends a young Russian soldier (Nikonenko), who is dying of a stomach wound. The two friends, who cannot communicate through language, begin to act like young boys and innocently play games together, forgetting their roles of captor and prisoner. The Russian soldier finally dies of his wound and Jozak again begins his journey home, wearing his dead friend's Soviet army uniform to stay warm.

While My Way Home had received modest international attention, his next feature in 1965, The Round-Up (Szegénylegények), was a huge hit domestically and internationally and is often considered a significant work of world cinema. The film was again written by Hernádi and starred János Görbe, Zoltán Latinovits, Tibor Molnár, Gábor Agárdy and András Kozák.

The Round-Up takes place shortly after a failed Hungarian uprising against Austrian rule in 1848 and the attempts by the authorities to weed out those who took part in the rebellion. The film was shot in widescreen in black and white by regular Jancsó collaborator Tamás Somló. Although it is Jancsó most famous film, The Round-Up does not exhibit many of his trademark elements to the degree to which he would later develop them: thus, the takes are comparatively short and although the camera movements are carefully choreographed they do not exhibit the elaborate fluid style that would become distinctive in later films. The film does, though, use Jancsó's favorite setting, the Hungarian puszta (plain), shot in characteristically oppressive sunlight.

The Round-Up premiered at the 1966 Cannes Film Festival and was a huge international success. Hungarian film critic Zoltán Fábri called it "perhaps the best Hungarian film ever made." Film critic Derek Malcolm included The Round-Up in his list of the 100 greatest films ever made. In Hungary, the film was seen by over a million people (in a country with a population of 10 million).

Jancsó's next work The Red and the White (Csillagosok, katonák, 1967) was a Hungarian-Soviet co-production to celebrate the 50th anniversary of the October 1917 revolution in Russia and the subsequent Hungarian Revolution of 1919. Jancsó set the action two years later during the Russian Civil War and, he made an anti-heroic film depicting the senselessness and brutality of armed combat. The film starred József Madaras, Tibor Molnár and András Kozák and was written by Jancsó.

Along with The Confrontation, The Red and the White would have premiered at the 1968 Cannes Film Festival, but the festival was canceled due to the events of May 1968 in France. Internationally this film was Jancsó's biggest success, and received critical acclaim in Western Europe and the United States. It won the Best Foreign Film award from the French Syndicate of Cinema Critics. Along with Red Psalm (1971) it is featured in the book "1001 Films You Must See Before You Die".

Jancsó then made Silence and Cry (Csend és kiáltás) in 1968. The film stars András Kozák as young revolutionary who goes into hiding in the country after the failed 1919 Hungarian Revolution. Kozák is hidden by a sympathetic farmer who is suspected by and constantly humiliated by the White Army. The farmer's wife is attracted to Kozák and begins to poison her husband. Kozák's morality compel him to turn the farmer's wife over to the White Army. This was the first film that Jancsó shot with cinematographer János Kende and was co-written by Gyula Hernádi and Jancsó.

Also in 1968, Jancsó shot his first work in color, The Confrontation (Fényes szelek, 1969). It also was the first film to introduce song and dance as an essential part of the film, elements that would become increasingly important in his work of the 1970s and his recent Pepe and Kapa films. The film stars Andrea Drahota, Kati Kovács and Lajos Balázsovits.

The film revolves around real events that took place when Hungary attempted to renovate its education system after the Communists came to power in 1947. In the film revolutionary students from one of the communist People's Colleges start a campaign to win over students from an older Catholic college. The campaign begins with songs and slogans, but eventually turns to violence and book burning.

Jancsó ended the decade with Sirokkó (Winter Wind) in 1969. The film starred Jacques Charrier, Marina Vlady, Ewa Swann, József Madaras, István Bujtor, György Bánffy and Philippe March. Jancsó and Hernádi wrote the script in collaboration with Francis Girod and Jacques Rouffio. The film depicts a group of Croat anarchists in the 1930s who plot to assassinate King Alexander I of Yugoslavia.

=== 1970s ===
In the late 1960s, Jancsó's films veered more towards symbolism, the takes became longer and the visual choreography became more elaborate. This found full fruition in the 1970s, when he took these elements to extremes. With regards shot-length, for example, Elektreia (Szerelmem, Elektra, 1974) consists of just 12 shots in a film lasting 70 minutes. This highly stylized approach (in contrast to the more realist approach of the 1960s) received widest acclaim with Red Psalm (Még kér a nép, 1971), which won Jancsó the Best Director award at Cannes in 1972. Like The Round-Up, Red Psalm focuses on a doomed uprising.

In the latter part of the 1970s, Jancsó started work on the ambitious Vitam et sanguinem trilogy, but only the first two films, Hungarian Rhapsody (Magyar rapszódia, 1978) and Allegro Barbaro (1978) were made as critical reaction was muted. At the time, the films were the most expensive to have been produced in Hungary. During the 1970s, Jancsó divided his time between Italy and Hungary and made a number of films in Italy, the best known of which is Private Vices, Public Virtues (Vizi privati, pubbliche virtù, 1975), an interpretation of the Mayerling affair. His Italian films, though, have been critically derided. Unlike Jancsó's 1980s films, there has been no general critical reassessment of his Italian works and they remain the most obscure part of his filmography.

=== 1980s ===
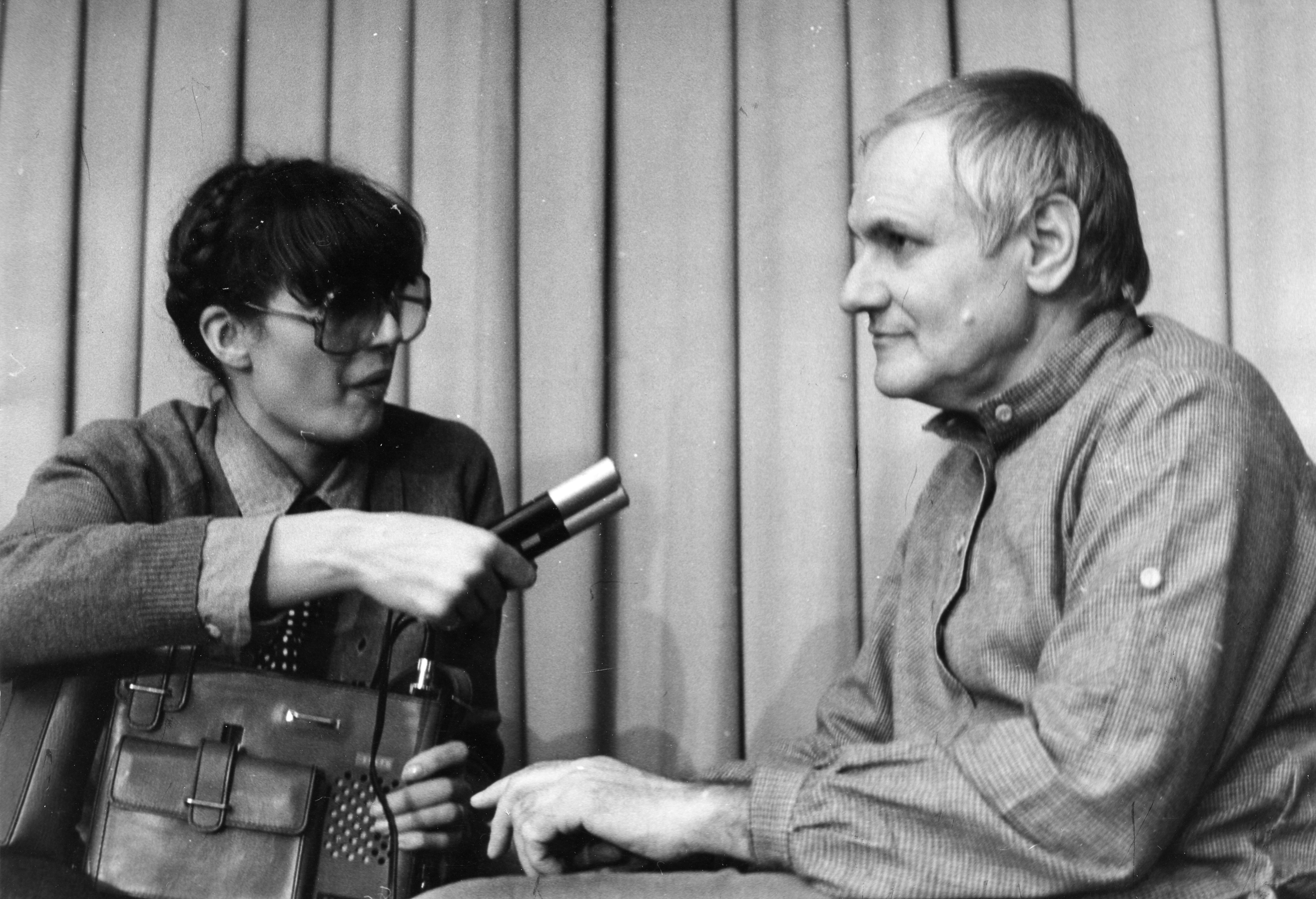
Jancsó (right) interviewed for Magyar Rádió ((1980)

Jancsó's 1980s films were not successful and at the time some critics accused Jancsó of simply rehashing visual and thematic elements from his previous films. However, more recently these works have been re-evaluated and some critics consider this period to contain Jancsó's most important works.

The Tyrant's Heart (A zsarnok szíve, avagy Boccaccio Magyarországon, 1981) can be considered a transitional film between the famous historical works of the 1960s and '70s and Jancsó's later, more ironic and self-aware films. While it still has a historical setting (a 15th-century palace in Hungary), the film's ontological inquiry groups it more easily with the director's later period. The film deliberately undercuts the audience's ability to construct a notion of reality in the plot, which contradicts itself and includes many post-modern interventions to raise questions about its own manipulative nature.

His 1985 film Dawn (A hajnal) was entered into the 36th Berlin International Film Festival. In 1987, he was a member of the jury at the 15th Moscow International Film Festival.

Later in the decade, Jancsó dispensed with the historical rural settings of the Hungarian puszta and shifted to contemporary urban Budapest. Thus Season of Monsters (Szörnyek évadja, 1986) became the first Jancsó film with scenes in of contemporary Budapest since Cantata 23 years earlier. Although this film is set in a contemporary environment, very little of it is set in the city and much of it still on the puszta. While some new visual tropes were introduced (including a fascination with television screens that show clips of later or earlier action in the film), others, such as candles and naked women, were preserved. In later films of the decade Jancsó continued to use the surrealistic-parodistic style he developed in "Season". These films – at last – are set in an urban environment.

Although some critics reacted positively (Season of Monsters, for example, won an honorable mention at Venice for creating "a new picture language"), critical reaction generally to these films was very harsh indeed, with some critics labeling them as self-parody. More recently, critics have been kinder to these dense and often deliberately obtuse films, with some considering his 1980s work to be his most compelling, but a full rehabilitation has been hindered by the fact that these works are very rarely screened.

His 1989 film Jesus Christ's Horoscope was entered into the 16th Moscow International Film Festival.

=== 1990s and 2000s ===
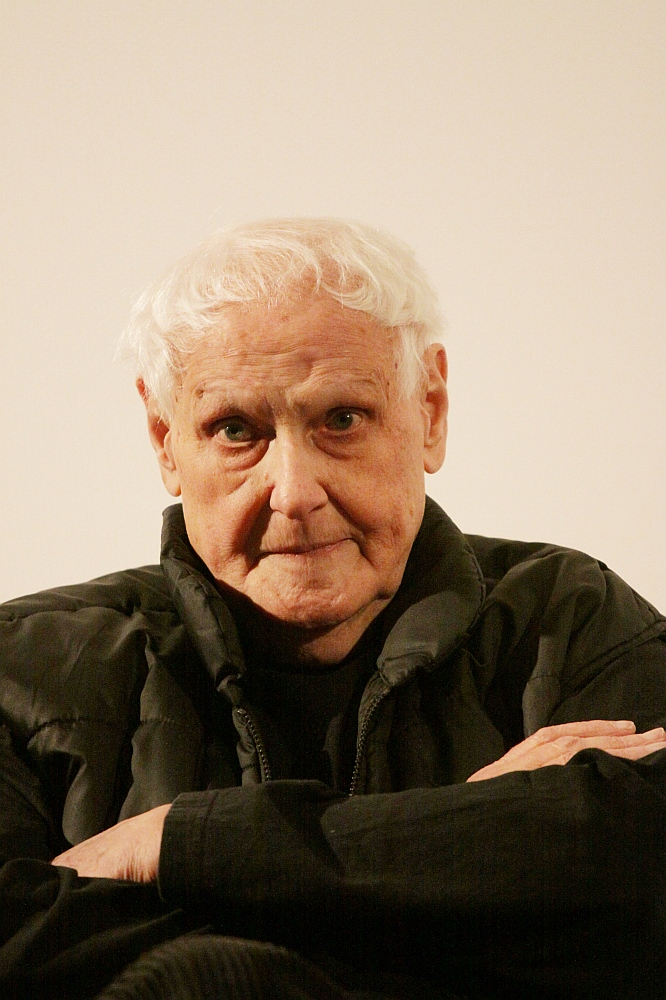
Miklós Jancsó at a press screening of his movie, So Much for Justice!, 1 February 2010, Budapest

In the early 1990s, Jancsó made two films that thematically can be grouped with the works from the 1980s, God Walks Backwards (Isten hátrafelé megy, 1990) and Blue Danube Waltz (Kék Duna keringő, 1991). Although they continue the work of the previous decade, they are also reactions to the Hungary's new post-Communist reality and explore the inherent power struggles. After a long break from making full-length features, Jancsó returned with The Lord's Lantern in Budapest (Nekem lámpást adott kezembe az Úr Pesten, 1999), which proved to be a surprising come-back for the director. The film largely (but not entirely) dispenses with long takes and choreographed camera movements, and for this Jancsó started working with a new director-of-photography Ferenc Grunwalsky (who is also a director in his own right). The loose plot follows two gravediggers Pepe and Kapa as they try to make sense of the shifting realities of post-Communist Budapest. Despite mocking young Hungarians for their shallowness, the film proved a minor hit with them, helped by the performances by some of Hungary's top music acts in the film.

In the late 1990s, Jancsó's career revived with a series of improvised low-budget films that were witty and self-deprecating. As well as doing relatively well at the Hungarian box office for art house fare, these films have been popular with a new generation of younger viewers. The success of The Lord's Lantern in Budapest has led to a series of six "Pepe and Kapa" films. Although all of these films are rooted in the present, later ones have also seen Jancsó return to his earlier love of historical themes, including depictions of the Holocaust and Hungary's devastating defeat to the Ottomans in 1526, usually in the context of criticizing Hungarians for not understanding the meaning of their own history. These films have been highly popular among young cinephiles, mainly for the post-modernist, contemporary approach to filmmaking, the black, absurd humor and the appearance of several popular alternative and/or underground bands and persons. Jancsó has also cemented his reputation by making appearances in a number of films. As well as appearing as himself in the Pepe and Kapa films, he has also had guest roles in works by young, up-and-coming Hungarian directors.

In addition to feature films, Jancsó made a number of shorts and documentaries throughout his career and from 1971 into the 1980s also directed work for the theater. Miklós Jancsó has been honorary scholar at the University of Theatre and Film Arts in Budapest since 1988, and was an affiliate at Harvard between 1990 and 1992.

== Politics ==
During the Communist era, Jancsó was often criticized for being formalist, nationalist and generally against the Marxist-Leninist ideology. From the 1990s onwards, Jancsó became known for loudly supporting Hungarian liberal party SZDSZ. Many of his claims, like his wry dismissal of Hungary and its history made him a somewhat controversial figure. He also campaigned for the legalization of cannabis.

== Personal life ==
Jancsó married Katalin Wowesznyi in 1949; their two children are Nyika (Miklós Jancsó Jr., b.1952) and Babus (Katalin Jancsó, b.1955). After divorcing Wowesznyi, he married film director Márta Mészáros in 1958. In 1968, Jancsó met Italian journalist and screenwriter Giovanna Gagliardo in Budapest. They moved to Rome, where he worked for nearly a decade, with occasional, short periods in Budapest. In 1980, he separated from Gagliardo and married film editor Zsuzsa Csákány the following year. They had a son, the film editor Dávid, in 1982.

Jancsó died of lung cancer on 31 January 2014, at the age of 92. Fellow Hungarian director Béla Tarr called Jancsó "the greatest Hungarian film director of all time."

== Awards ==
Jancsó received five nominations for the Best Director Award at the Cannes Film Festival. winning for Red Psalm in 1972. In 1973 he was awarded the prestigious Kossuth Prize in Hungary. He received awards for his life work in 1979 and 1990, at Cannes and Venice respectively.

== Filmography ==
=== Features ===
- The Bells Have Gone to Rome (1958)
- Cantata (1963)
- My Way Home (1965)
- The Round-Up (1966)
- The Red and the White (1967)
- Silence and Cry (1968)
- Decameron '69 (1969)
- The Confrontation (1969)
- Winter Wind (1969)
- The Pacifist (1970)
- Agnus dei (1971)
- La tecnica e il rito (TV movie, 1971)
- Red Psalm (1972)
- Roma rivuole Cesare (TV movie, 1974)
- Electra, My Love (1974)
- Private Vices, Public Virtues (1976)
- Hungarian Rhapsody (1978)
- Allegro barbaro (1979)
- The Tyrant's Heart (1981)
- Faustus doktor boldogságos pokoljárása (TV mini-series, 1984)
- Omega, Omega, Omega (TV movie, 1984)
- Dawn (1986)
- Season of Monsters (1987)
- Jesus Christ's Horoscope (1989)
- God Walks Backwards (1991)
- Blue Danube Waltz (1992)
- The Lord's Lantern in Budapest (1999)
- Mother! The Mosquitoes (2000)
- Last Supper at the Arabian Gray Horse (2001)
- Wake Up, Mate, Don't You Sleep (2002)
- A mohácsi vész (2004)
- Ede megevé ebédem (2006)
- So Much for Justice! (2010)

=== Documentaries and shorts ===
- 1960 Three Stars
- 1965 Jelenlét (short)
- 1966 Közelről: a vér (short)
- 1968 Vörös május
- 1970 Füst
- 1977 Laboratorio teatrale di Luca Ronconi (TV documentary)
- 1978 Második jelenlét (documentary short)
- 1984 Muzsika (TV movie)
- 1986 Harmadik jelenlét (documentary short)
- 1997 Hősök tere – régi búnk és... I (short)
- 1994 A kövek üzenete – Budapest (documentary series: part 1)
- 1994 A kövek üzenete – Máramaros (documentary series: part 2)
- 1994 A kövek üzenete – Hegyalja (documentary series: part 3)
- 1996 Szeressük egymást, gyerekek! (segment "Anagy agyhalal/The Great Brain Death")
- 1997 Hősök tere – régi búnk és... II (short)
- 1997 Játssz, Félix, játssz! (documentary)
- 1997 Hősök tere – régi búnk és... I (short)
- 1998 Sír a madár
- 2004 Európából Európába (documentary short) (segment 3)

=== Newsreel documentaries ===
- 1950 Kezünkbe vettük a béke ügyét
- 1951 A szovjet mezőgazdasági küldöttek tanításai
- 1952 A 8. szabad május 1
- 1953 Közös után
- 1953 Arat az orosházi Dózsa
- 1954 Ősz Badacsonyban
- 1954 Galga mentén
- 1954 Emberek! Ne engedjétek!
- 1954 Éltető Tisza-víz
- 1954 Egy kiállítás képei
- 1955 Varsói világifjúsági talákozó I-III
- 1955 Emlékezz, ifjúság!
- 1955 Egy délután Koppánymonostorban
- 1955 Angyalföldi fiatalok
- 1956 Móricz Zsigmond 1879–1942
- 1957 Színfoltok Kínából
- 1957 Peking palotái
- 1957 Kína vendégei voltunk
- 1957 Dél-Kína tájain
- 1957 A város peremén
- 1958 Derkovits Gyula 1894–1934
- 1959 Izotópok a gyógyászatban
- 1959 Halhatatlanság
- 1960 Az eladás művészete
- 1961 Indiántörténet
- 1961 Az idő kereke
- 1961 Alkonyok és hajnalok
- 1963 Hej, te eleven fa...
