= The Tyrant's Heart =

- Directed by: Miklós Jancsó
- Written by: Miklós Jancsó; Giovanna Gagliardo; Gyula Hernádi
- Starring: József Madaras
- Cinematography: János Kende
- Music by: György Orbán; Zoltán Simon
- Release date: 1981
- Language: Hungarian

The Tyrant's Heart (Hungarian: A zsarnok szíve, avagy Boccaccio Magyarországon) is a 1981 Hungarian drama film written by Gyula Hernádi and directed by Miklós Jancsó.

The film was entered into the main competition at the 38th edition of the Venice Film Festival.

== Cast ==
- Teresa Ann Savoy as Katalin
- László Gálffi as Gáspár
- József Madaras as Károly
- Ninetto Davoli as Filippo
- Géza D. Hegedüs as Csuhás
- György Cserhalmi as Ferhád Pasha

== Reception ==
"This Renaissance fantasy uses wind machines, conveyor belts, masks, duck-shape codpieces, occasional tomtom accompaniment and a bear's cage decorated with origami birds. It also employs an abundance of mime, which is a good many people's least favorite performing art.

This arsenal of tactics is all in the service of the tale of a returning young Hungarian King who has Italian friends, Turkish enemies and an alleged 'mother,' who looks younger than he. What is her secret? She is suspected of sacrificing a different young woman each day so as to maintain her looks. Quite a beauty secret.

'The Tyrant's Heart,' which has as much the feeling of a sideshow as of the tone poem Mr. Jancso apparently intends, has become almost unbearably precious well before one character turns to the camera and says, of another player, 'He's only an actor; don't kill him.' Not even the naked nymphs, of whom there are quite a few, can save it from being dull." - New York Times review (October 4, 1982)
