= Blue Danube Waltz (film) =

- Kék Duna keringö
- Directed by: Miklós Jancsó; István Márton
- Written by: Gyula Hernádi; Miklós Jancsó
- Starring: György Cserhalmi; József Madaras; Ildikó Bánsági
- Cinematography: János Kende
- Edited by: Hajnal Sellõ
- Music by: Tamás Cseh; Vilmos Jávori; Róbert Rátonyi Jr.
- Distributed by: Mokép
- Release date: 1992
- Running time: 90 minutes
- Country: Hungary
- Language: Hungarian

Blue Danube Waltz (Hungarian: Kárhozat) is a 1992 Hungarian political thriller film directed by Miklós Jancsó, co-directed by István Márton. The plot sees a newly-elected post Communism Hungarian PM is assassinated in Danube hotel. Jancso won the Best Director award at the 1992 Montréal World Film Festival. The film was one of the first in Hungary to utilize Western co-financing after the fall of Communism.

== Cast ==
- György Cserhalmi
- József Madaras
- Ildikó Bánsági
