= Season of Monsters =

1987 film directed by Miklós Jancsó

- Directed by: Miklós Jancsó
- Written by: Gyula Hernádi
- Starring: József Madaras
- Cinematography: János Kende
- Music by: Tamás Cseh; Zoltán Simon
- Release date: 1987
- Language: Hungarian

Season of Monsters (Hungarian: Szörnyek évadja) is a 1987 Hungarian drama film written by Gyula Hernádi and directed by Miklós Jancsó.

The film was entered into the main competition at the 44th edition of the Venice Film Festival, and it got a Jury Honorable Mention "for the coherence with which he carries on and renews his expressive research in a period of rapid evolution of film language".

== Plot ==
At a country house, a retiring teacher celebrates his birthday, where professors and students discuss Existentialism and philosophy. Then an unsettling play opens up a mystery.

== Cast ==
- József Madaras as Kamondi
- György Cserhalmi as Dr. Bardócz
- Ferenc Kállai as Sándor Kovács
- Julia Nyakó as Kati
- Katarzyna Figura as Annabella
- András Bálint as Zoltán Zoltai
- Miklós B. Székely as The Deaf-mute
- András Kozák as Colonel Antal
- Lajos Balázsovits as Zimmermann
