= Agnus Dei (1971 film) =

1971 Hungarian film

Agnus Dei (Hungarian: Égi bárány) is a 1971 Hungarian film directed by Miklós Jancsó. The film follows a priest during the suppression of the 1919 Revolution and the rise of fascism in Hungary. The film was screened for the Directors' Fortnight (Quinzaine des Réalizateurs) at the 1971 Cannes Film Festival. Jancsó considered the film a departure from his prior filmography, which he considered more realistic and popular.

== Premise ==
The film deals in the aftermath of the overthrowing of the Béla Kun Commune in 1919, following the chaos of civil war after the fall of the Austro-Hungarian Empire. Communards try to maintain control in the countryside, including the support of an eccentric priest, Father Vargha, who heralds a new bloody oppression.

== Cast ==
- József Madaras (Father Vargha)
- Daniel Olbrychski (violinist)
- András Kozák
- Anna Széles (blonde girl)
- István Bujtor (crane operator)
- Jaroslava Schallerová (young mother)
- István Avar
- Körtvélyessy Zsolt
- Márk Zala (Father Márk)
- Lajos Balázsovits
- János Koltai
- Tamás Bálint
- György Pintér
