= Allegro barbaro =

Allegro barbaro (or Allegro barbara) may refer to:

- Allegro barbaro (Alkan), a piece for solo piano by Charles-Valentin Alkan from his set of studies Op. 35 (published 1847)
- Allegro barbaro (Bartók), a piece for solo piano (1911) by Béla Bartók
- Allegro barbaro (Ornstein), 1st movement of the Piano Quintet op.92 (1927) by Leo Ornstein
- Allegro barbaro (Smith), a piece for solo piano by Dave Smith from his 1st Piano Concert (1985-6)
- Allegro barbaro (album), an album by the German heavy metal band Die Apokalyptischen Reiter
- Allegro barbaro (film), a film by Miklós Jancsó

Bartok would have been made aware of the earlier Alkan example by fellow composer-pianist Ferrucio Busoni. Ornstein's work was premiered by the composer on 1st January 1928 in Philadelphia, a concert he shared with Bartok.
