= Song of Wily William =

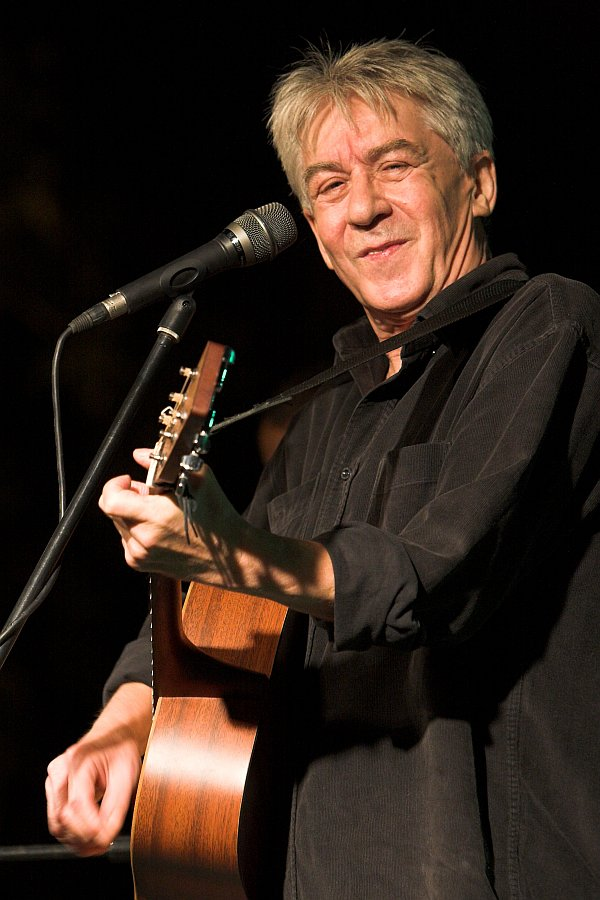
Tamás Cseh in 2006

Song of Wily William (Hungarian: Dal a ravaszdi Shakespeare Williamről) is a song in Hungarian about the famous playwright, William Shakespeare co-written by musician Tamás Cseh and songwriter Géza Bereményi, first released on Cseh's fourth album, Műcsarnok (named after the Hall of Art in Budapest), in 1981. It was written in early 1973, and was performed on several occasions before its album release. Similarly to most of Tamás Cseh's songs, this song was performed with Cseh's own guitar chordal.

== Synopsis ==
The song is a tribute to William Shakespeare as a playwright. It enlists three plays of Shakespeare, and admires the characterisation of three main characters, pointing out the psychological reflectiveness of each. All three plays mentioned are tragedies, and all the characters are title characters (Hamlet, Othello and Richard III).

The lyrics use the Eastern name order, probably to strengthen the idea represented in the chorus: that William Shakespeare has no equal in the songwriter's country, Hungary. Similar “Hungarianization” can be heard in the deliberately hungarianized pronunciation of Shakespeare's name: Hungarian pronunciation: [ˈʃɛkspir 'viliɑm] on all the recordings.

== Writing, first public performance and recording ==
Just like most of Tamás Cseh's songs, the lyrics were written by Géza Bereményi. It was first performed as part of a performance of Shakespeare's comedy, Twelfth Night, on 6 July 1973, in Szentendre. Evidence suggests that the original form did not contain the verses referring to Richard III.

The first studio recording of the song was released on Tamás Cseh's fourth studio album, Műcsarnok, published by Pepita in 1981. Most songs on the album reflect on well-known writers and poets, such as Arthur Rimbaud, Sándor Petőfi and Fyodor Dostoevsky.

== Sources ==
- Official webpage of the Tamás Cseh Foundation (in Hungarian)
- Song of Wily William on YouTube (in Hungarian)
