= Krystyna Mikołajewska =

Polish actress (born 1939)

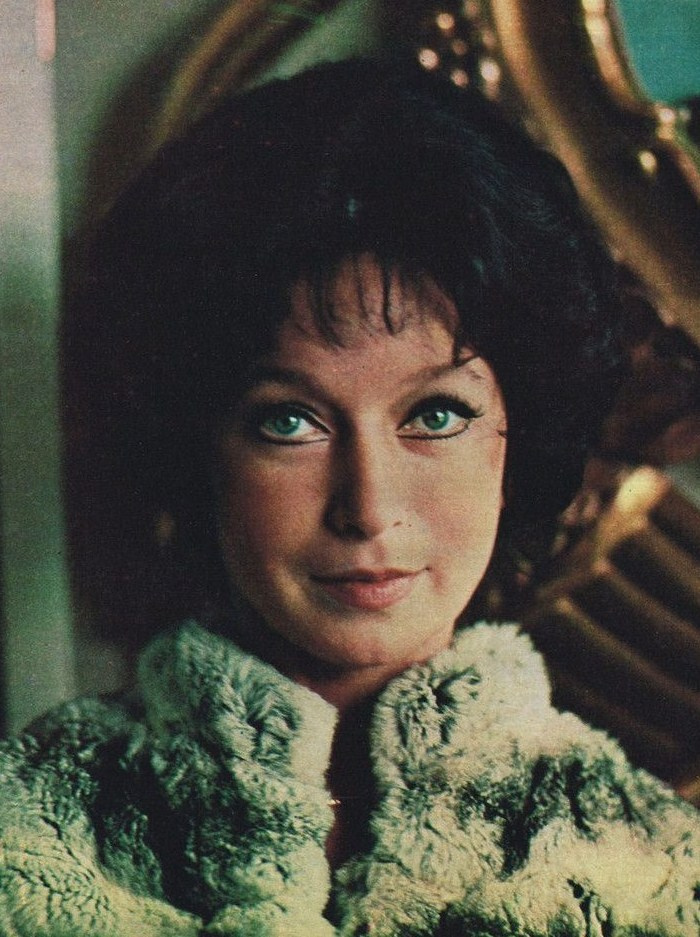
- Krystyna Mikołajewska in 1975
- Born: 6 September 1939 (age 86); Pabianice, Poland
- Occupation: actress

Krystyna Mikołajewska (born 6 September 1939) is a Polish actress who appeared in several productions by the East German film company DEFA, and other notable movies.

== Career ==
Mikołajewska trained at the State College of Ludwik Solski Theatre in Kraków, received first prize in the 1958 National Competition V Recytatorskim (poetry recitation), and began appearing in theater, TV, and film before graduating in 1964. Her first major role was in Jerzy Kawalerowicz's 1966 historical film Pharaoh, which earned an Academy Award nomination for best Foreign Language Film of 1967. She then appeared in Miklós Jancsó's classic The Red and the White (1967). In the late 1960s she often worked in the German Democratic Republic (East Germany), where she appeared in Roland Oehme and Lothar Warneke's comedy-of-errors Not With Me, Madam! (1969), and had a starring role in Konrad Petzold's DEFA 'red western', Ordeal by Innocence (1970).

Throughout her career Mikołajewska worked regularly on stage, starting at Wojciech Bogusławski Theatre in Kalisz. In 1966−68 she performed in theaters in Wrocław, and, in the 1968−1972 seasons, acted at the Old Theatre in Kraków. In the 1970s and 1980s she appeared only sporadically before the camera, and performed at the National Theatre in Warsaw.

== Filmography ==
(A selection of notable films featuring Mikołajewska; Polish productions, where not otherwise noted.)

- Belyy sneg Rossii (1980) "White Snow of Russia" – Russian
- Soldaty svobody (1977) "Soldiers of Freedom" – Russian/joint Eastern European (10 hr. series; Mikolajewska appears in pts. I & II)
- Tödlicher Irrtum (1970) "Fatal Error"/"Double Take"/"Ordeal by Innocence" – East German
- Az idö ablakai (1969) "Windows of Time" – Hungarian
- Mit mir nicht, Madam! (1969) "Not With Me, Madam!" – East German
- Sramno leto (1969) "Shameful Summer" – Yugoslavian (Bosnian)
- Dita Saxová (1968) – Czechoslovak
- Csillagosok, katonák (1967) "The Red and the White" – Hungarian/Russian
- Morderca zostawia ślad (1967) "The Killer Leaves a Trace"
- Cała naprzód (1967) "Full Speed Ahead"
- Bumerang (1966) "Boomerang"
- Sobotki (1966)
- Faraon (1966) "Pharaoh"
- Kontrybucja (1966) "Contribution"
- Weekendy (1963) "Weekends"
