= Andrea Drahota =

Hungarian actress (born 1941)

- Born: 15 July 1941 (age 85); Veszprém, Hungary
- Occupation: Actress
- Years active: 1964–present

Andrea Drahota (born 15 July 1941) is a Hungarian actress. She appeared in more than thirty films since 1964.

== Selected filmography ==
Film
Year	Title	Role	Notes
1972	Red Psalm		
1969	The Confrontation		
1968	Walls		
1968	Silence and Cry		
1964	Sodrásban		
