= Silence and Cry =

- Directed by: Miklós Jancsó
- Starring: Mari Törőcsik; József Madaras
- Release date: 14 March 1968
- Running time: 1h 13min
- Country: Hungary
- Language: Hungarian

Silence and Cry (Hungarian: Csend és kiáltás) is a 1968 Hungarian drama film directed by Miklós Jancsó.

== Plot ==
In 1919, after just a few months of communist rule, the Hungarian Republic of Councils was dissolved by a nationalist counter-revolution. Admiral Horthy, leader of the nationalists, assumed power as the Regent of Hungary. Hungarian Red Army soldiers were relentlessly pursued by the secret police and Hungarian Royal Gendarmerie and faced summary execution. One, István Cserzi, has fled to the Great Hungarian Plain and taken refuge on a farm run by two women. Due to their help and that of a childhood friend who is a commandant of the local Gendarmarie, István is relatively safe if he keeps out of sight. However, discovering that the women are slowly poisoning the husband of one of them and his mother, the farm's owners, István must decide whether to denounce them to the authorities at the likely cost of his own life.

== Cast ==
- Mari Törőcsik - Teréz
- József Madaras - Károly
- Zoltán Latinovits - Kémeri
- Andrea Drahota - Anna
- András Kozák - István
- István Bujtor - Kovács II.

== Background ==
The film is the second of three films by Jancsó about the conflict of 1919. It also considered one of the director's "formalist" films.
