= Hungarian Rhapsody (1979 film) =

1979 film

- Directed by: Miklós Jancsó
- Written by: Miklós Jancsó; Gyula Hernádi
- Starring: György Cserhalmi
- Cinematography: János Kende
- Edited by: Zsuzsa Csákány
- Release date: 4 October 1979
- Running time: 103 minutes
- Country: Hungary
- Language: Hungarian

Hungarian Rhapsody (Hungarian: Magyar rapszódia) is a 1979 Hungarian drama film directed by Miklós Jancsó. It was entered into the 1979 Cannes Film Festival. It won Golden Peacock (Best Film) at the 7th International Film Festival of India.

The film depicts "a peasant revolt in Hungary in the early twentieth century." "Hungarian Rhapsody and Allegro Barbaro (both 1978) formed the first two parts of an uncompleted trilogy on the life of a nationalist executed in 1944 for his involvement in an anti-Hitler plot. Both were judged too parochial to travel abroad.", commented the Sydney Morning Herald at the death of the director.

== Cast ==
- György Cserhalmi as Zsadányi István
- Lajos Balázsovits as Zsadányi Gábor
- Gábor Koncz as Szeles-Tóth
- Udo Kier as Poór
- István Bujtor as Héderváry
- József Madaras as Baksa András
- Anikó Sáfár as Hanna
- Zsuzsa Czinkóczi as Eszter
- István Kovács as Komáry István gróf
- Imre Sarlai as Id. Zsadányi
- Anna Takács
- Djoko Rosic as (as Dzsoko Roszich)
- Rada Rassimov
