= Sodrásban =

- Directed by: István Gaál
- Starring: Andrea Drahota; Marianna Moór
- Production company: Hunnia Filmgyár
- Release date: 2 April 1964
- Running time: 1h 21min
- Country: Hungary
- Language: Hungarian

Sodrásban is a 1964 Hungarian drama film directed by István Gaál. The film was chosen to be part of the Budapest Twelve, a list of Hungarian films considered the best in 1968.

== Cast ==
- Andrea Drahota – Vadóc
- Marianna Moór – Böbe
- Istvánné Zsipi – Anna néni
- Sándor Csikós – Laci
- János Harkányi – Gabi
- András Kozák – Luja
