= The Red and the White =

1967 Soviet Union film

- Directed by: Miklós Jancsó
- Written by: Miklós Jancsó
- Produced by: Jenoe Goetz
- Starring: József Madaras
- Cinematography: Tamás Somló
- Edited by: Zoltán Farkas
- Production company: Mafilm Mosfilm
- Release date: 4 November 1967
- Running time: 90 minutes
- Countries: Soviet Union; Hungary
- Languages: Russian; Hungarian

The Red and the White (Hungarian: Csillagosok, katonák) is a 1967 war drama film directed by Miklós Jancsó about the Russian Civil War. The original Hungarian title, Csillagosok, katonák, can be translated as "Stars on their Caps" (literally "Stars, soldiers"), which, as with a number of Jancsó film titles, is a quote from a song. The film follows Hungarian Red Army soldiers led by an ardent commander (József Madaras) battling against the White Army in a remote Russian field near the Volga River.

The film was listed to compete at the 1968 Cannes Film Festival, but the festival was canceled due to the events of May 1968 in France. It was voted as "Best Foreign Film of 1969" by the French Syndicate of Cinema Critics.

== Plot ==
The film tells the story of the Hungarian branch of the soldiers who, during World War I ended up in Russian captivity. When the revolution breaks out and begins a civil war in Russia, the soldiers are on the side of the Bolsheviks. Some are hoping that this will make it easier to come home. Others feed on sympathy for the ideology of communism. Some have to fight with an army of White Guards, who tend to be very cruel.

== Cast ==
- József Madaras – Hungarian Commander
- Tibor Molnár – Andras
- András Kozák – Laszlo
- Jácint Juhász – Istvan
- Anatoli Yabbarov – Captain Chelpanov
- Sergei Nikonenko – Cossack Officer
- Mikhail Kozakov – Nestor
- Bolot Bejshenaliyev – Chingiz
- Tatyana Konyukhova – Yelizaveta the Matron (as Tatiana Koniukova)
- Krystyna Mikołajewska – Olga
- Viktor Avdyushko – Sailor
- Gleb Strizhenov – Colonel
- Nikita Mikhalkov – White Officer Glazunov

Savely Kramarov also makes an appearance as White Cossack Savva who has a task to execute one of the prisoners of war.

== Production ==
The film, a Soviet-Hungarian co-production, was originally commissioned to celebrate the 50th anniversary of the October Revolution in Russia in which the Bolsheviks seized power. However, Jancsó chose to set the action two years later in 1919 and showed Hungarian irregulars supporting the Communist "Reds" in fighting the Tsarist "Whites" as the two sides battled for control in the hills overlooking the Volga river. As well as deviating on the required setting, Jancsó also chose to use a radically different approach to the film than that expected. Rather than shooting a hagiographic account of the birth of Soviet Communism, Jancsó produced a profoundly anti-heroic film that depicts the senseless brutality of the Russian Civil War specifically and all armed combat in general.

== Reception ==
The film was not well received in the Soviet Union, where it was first re-edited to put a more heroic spin on the war for its premiere. The film had a theatrical release in the USSR November 7, 1967, with a circulation of 112 film copies. The picture was watched by 2.6 million viewers. In Hungary and the West it was favourably received and it had a theatrical release in many countries (opening in the United States on 20 September 1968). It remains one of Jancsó's most widely seen and admired films, although audiences often find it exceedingly difficult to follow. The film's difficulty stems from its lack of central characters and defiant rejection of war film conventions: for example, key moments of action, such as the deaths of certain characters are sometimes shot with a long lens from a distance rather than in close-up, making it unclear what has happened or to whom it has happened. Supporters of the film point out that the hard-to-follow plot merely reflects the confused and meaningless nature of war itself and that Jancsó's aim is to prevent us from emotionally identifying with any one side in the battle of ideologies. For this reason, detractors (and even supporters) often find the film to be "cold" and "mechanical". However, the film's defenders contrast this approach with more conventional anti-war films, which often paradoxically adopt the same visual language and narrative conventions as heroic war films.

More universally appreciated, however, is the film's dramatic use of black-and-white anamorphic widescreen, with stylized compositions and elegant camera movements, shot by cinematographer Tamás Somló. In this The Red and the White looks forward to later Jancsó films such as Red Psalm (Még kér a nép, 1971) in which the visual language developed by dramatically increasing the shot length, using even more "balletic" camera movements and further stylizing the visual composition to the point of overt symbolism.

== Influence ==
In a red carpet interview with Letterboxd, director Yorgos Lanthimos named The Red and the White one of his all-time favourite films.
