= Tibor Molnár =

Hungarian actor

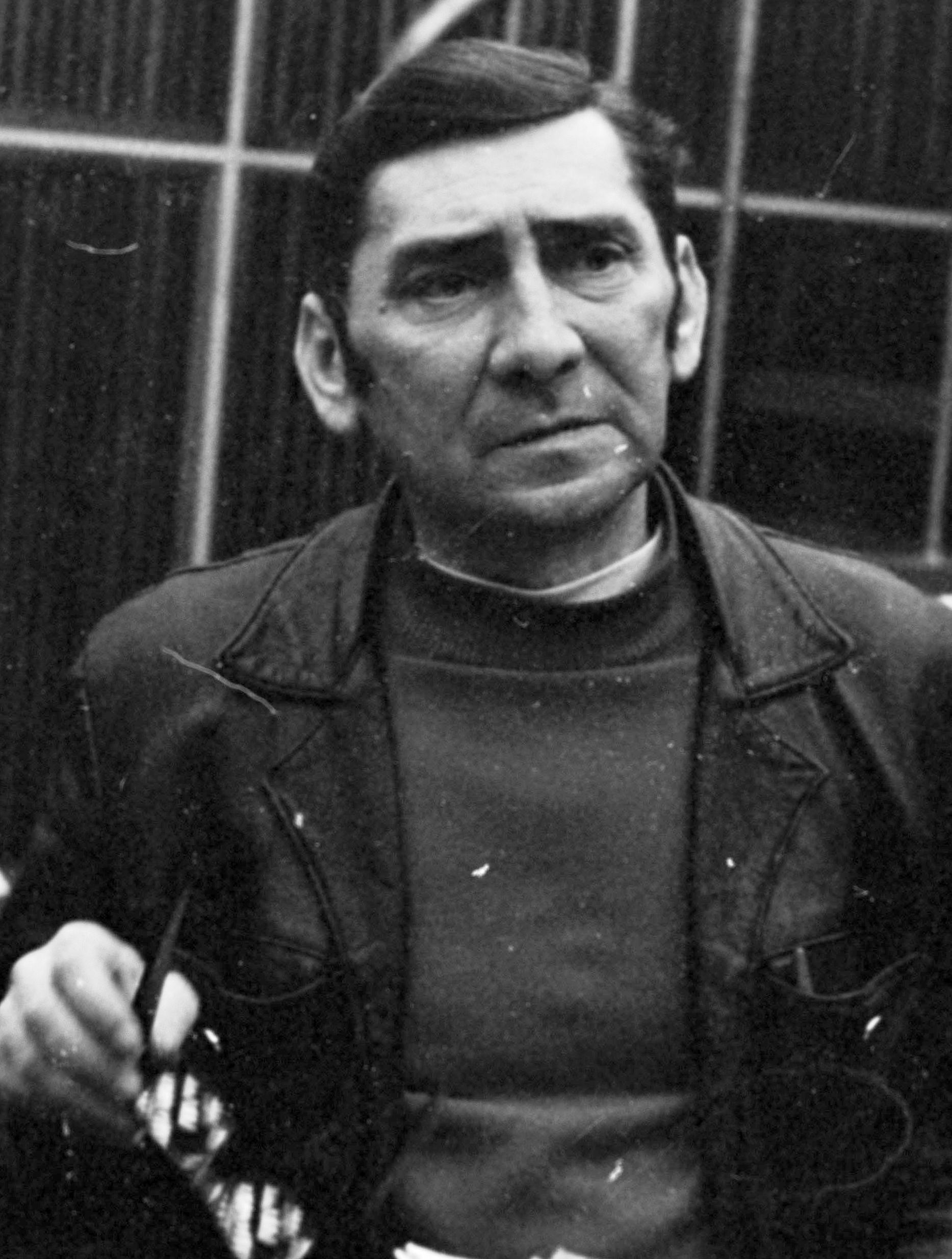
- Born: 26 July 1921; Zagyvapálfalva, Hungary
- Died: 24 November 1982 (aged 61); Budapest, Hungary
- Occupation: Actor
- Years active: 1948–1982

Tibor Molnár (26 July 1921 – 24 November 1982) was a Hungarian film actor. He appeared in more than 90 films between 1948 and 1982.

== Selected filmography ==
- Tüz (1948)
- Treasured Earth (1948) - Tarcali Jani
- Szabóné (1949)
- Lúdas Matyi (1950)
- Úri muri (1950)
- Honesty and Glory (1951) - Bikov, szovjet sztahanovista
- Déryné (1951) - Katona József
- Battle in Peace (1952) - Széki
- Vihar (1952) - Göndöcs Gyula párttitkár
- Semmelweis (1952) - Hamerlin
- Állami áruház (1953)
- Föltámadott a tenger (1953) - Irinyi
- A harag napja (1953) - Bognár
- Kiskrajcár (1953) - Kubikus
- Rokonok (1954)
- Simon Menyhért születése (1954)
- Springtime in Budapest (1955) - Gazsó Bertalan
- A Strange Mask of Identity (1955) - Busa János
- Ward 9 (1955) - Tóth Gáspár
- Szakadék (1956) - Bakos Ferenc
- Ünnepi vacsora (1956) - Tuba Sanyi
- Mese a 12 találatról (1957)
- Two Confessions (1957)
- By Order of the Emperor (1957) - Mihály
- Quelqu'un frappe à la porte (1958) - Alexandre
- Refuge England (1959, Short)
- Megöltek egy lányt (1961) - Marci
- Two Half Times in Hell (1961) - Rácz
- Megszállottak (1962) - Fõigazgató
- Májusi fagy (1962)
- Pesti háztetök (1962) - Csurik
- Lopott boldogság (1962) - Szirák, Sándor
- Land of Angels (1962) - Imre bácsi
- Isten öszi csillaga (1963)
- Bálvány (1963) - Drahos
- Párbeszéd (1963) - Králik Géza
- Fotó Háber (1963)
- The Man Who Doesn't Exist (1964) - Zámbó
- Karambol (1964) - Edzõ
- Miért rosszak a magyar filmek? (1964) - Tokodi
- Váltás (1964)
- My Way Home (1965) - Hazatérõ férfi
- Twenty Hours (1965) - Máthé
- Déltöl hajnalig (1965) - Balla János
- A köszívü ember fiai (1965) - Magyar tábornok
- A Tenkes kapitánya (1965) - Siklósi
- The Round-Up (1965) - Kabai
- Fény a redöny mögött (1966) - Teherautósofõr
- Szentjános fejevétele (1966) - Tsz-elnök
- Hideg napok (1966) - Börtönparancsnok
- Nem szoktam hazudni (1966) - Rendõr
- Édes és keserü (1967) - Rendõ
- Utószezon (1967) - Aranyozó
- Sellö a pecsétgyürün (1967, part 1, 2) - Busa
- Ten Thousand Days (1967) - Széles István
- The Red and the White (1967) - Andras
- A völgy (1968) - Tibor
- A holtak visszajárnak (1968) - Solti
- Az utolsó kör (1968) - Sanyi Apja
- Stars of Eger (1968) - Márton pap
- The Upthrown Stone (1969) - Kerék András
- Az örökös (1969) - Mûvezetõ
- Szemüvegesek (1969) - Szántó
- Szemtöl szembe (1970) - Szlovák partizán
- Arc (1970) - Andi szomszédja
- Mérsékelt égöv (1970) - Kovács István
- Gyula vitéz télen-nyáron (1970) - Lajos
- Én vagyok Jeromos (1971) - A bányász
- Red Psalm (1972) - Lovas Imre, szocialista
- Harminckét nevem volt (1972)
- Romantika (1972) - Egy paraszt
- A locsolókocsi (1974) - Mihálik
- Tüzgömbök (1975) - Zách József
- Ha megjön József (1976) - Dávid, Ágnes volt férje
- Árvácska (1976) - Egy férfi
- Man Without a Name (1976) - Péter bácsi
- A királylány zsámolya (1976) - Szénégetõ
- A csillagszemü (1977) - Molnár
- Hungarians (1978) - Gáspár Dániel
- A közös bün (1978) - Stibor
- A ménesgazda (1978)
- Kinek a törvénye? (1979) - Antal Samu
- Kojak Budapesten (1980)
- Forbidden Relations (1983) - Pista bácsi
- Keserü igazság (1986) - Bónis
