= A Nice Neighbor =

1979 film

- Film poster
- Directed by: Zsolt Kézdi-Kovács
- Written by: Zsolt Kézdi-Kovács; Géza Bereményi
- Starring: László Szabó
- Cinematography: János Zsombolyai
- Edited by: Zoltán Farkas
- Distributed by: Facets Multimedia Distribution
- Release date: 20 September 1979 (Hungry)
- Running time: 102 minutes
- Country: Hungary
- Language: Hungarian

A Nice Neighbor (Hungarian: A kedves szomszéd) is a 1979 Hungarian drama film directed by Zsolt Kézdi-Kovács. It competed in the Un Certain Regard section of the 1979 Cannes Film Festival.

== Cast ==
- László Szabó as Dibusz Miklós
- Margit Dajka as Iduka
- Lajos Szabó as Okolicsni Feri bácsi
- Ági Margittay as Hajdúné (as Margittai Ági)
- Ágnes Kakassy as Erzsi (as Kakssy Ági)
- Csilla Herczeg as Bea
- Bertalan Solti as A tanár úr
- Ferenc Bencze as Szerelõ
- János Csapó as Hajdú
- László Paál as Svajda
- Sándor Szakácsi as Szerelõ
- József Almási as (as Almássy József)
- Léna Darás
- György Dörner as Bea élettársa
- Ilona Gurnik as Saci
