= Gypsy Lore =

1997 film

- Directed by: Bence Gyöngyössy
- Written by: Bence Gyöngyössy; András Nagy
- Starring: Đoko Rosić
- Release dates: 23 August 1997 (Montréal); 29 October 1998 (Hungary)
- Running time: 93 minutes
- Country: Hungary
- Languages: Hungarian; German

Gypsy Lore (Hungarian: Romani kris - Cigánytörvény) is a 1997 Hungarian drama film co-written and directed by Bence Gyöngyössy. It is an adaptation of King Lear. The film was selected as the Hungarian entry for the Best Foreign Language Film at the 71st Academy Awards, but was not accepted as a nominee.

== Cast ==
- Đoko Rosić as Lovér (as Djoko Rossich)
- Mihály Szabados as Tamáska
- Silvia Pincu as Ilka (as Silvia Pinku)
- Diliana Dimitrova as Kukunda
- Violetta Koleva as Sarolta
- János Derzsi as János
- Sami Osman as Joszo
- Umer Dzemailji as Rostás
- Piroska Molnár as Máli

== See also ==
- List of submissions to the 71st Academy Awards for Best Foreign Language Film
- List of Hungarian submissions for the Academy Award for Best Foreign Language Film
