= The Village Notary =

1845 novel by József Eötvös

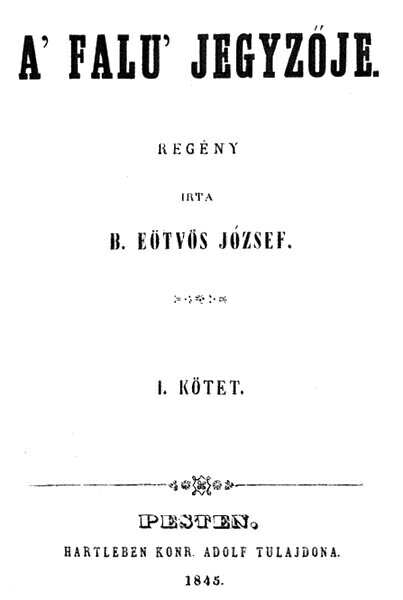
A falu jegyzője title page, 1845

The Village Notary (Hungarian: A falu jegyzője) is an 1845 novel by Hungarian writer József Eötvös, his second novel. It was the first Hungarian literary work that received international recognition. The novel is a story of intertwined lives of the notary Jónás Tengelyi and an outlaw Viola.

At least 25 editions of the book have been published.

== Commentary ==
Literary critics noticed a difficult style of the prose of the novel, with extremely long sentences, difficult both for readers and translators.

Bernard Adams writes that the novel was critical of the traditional feudal administration, where the elite was lazy and the lesser folk was at their mercy and abuse. However the criticism in the novel fell on deaf ears of the contemporaries. At the same time it did have an entertaining value, and it was republished in 1865, with much of digressive material removed. In modern Hungary it is a venerable classic studied in schools, but, as Adams puts it, "a classic book is one that people know they should read but somehow fail to".

== Translations ==
- German: Der Dorfnotar
  - by János Majláth, 1846
  - by Adolf Wielheim, 1877
- English: The Village Notary: A Romance of Hungarian Life, 1850, by Otto von Wenckstern, 1850
- Russian: Сельский нотариус, 1981
  - The Soviet critics interpreted the novel as follows: "The realistic novel is about the fates of progressive people in Hungarian society at the beginning of the 19th century, during the turbulent period preceding the revolutions of 1848. Noble heroes, bearers of progressive enlightened views, are opposed by egotists, intriguers who do not stop at betrayal and even crime."

== Adaptations ==
- 1872: a play Viola vagy az alföldi haramia [Viola, or The Great Plain Thief] by József Szigeti
- 1920: a Hungarian silent film directed by Oszkár Damó
- 1986: Hungarian TV series, directed by Éva Zsurzs starring András Kozák as the village notary and Jácint Juhász as Viola.
