= Milarepa (1973 film) =

1973 Italian film

- Theatrical release poster
- Directed by: Liliana Cavani
- Written by: Liliana Cavani; Italo Moscati
- Starring: Lajos Balázsovits; Paolo Bonacelli; Marisa Fabbri
- Cinematography: Armando Nannuzzi
- Edited by: Franco Arcalli
- Music by: Daniele Paris
- Production companies: Lotar Film; RAI
- Distributed by: RAI
- Release dates: 28 December 1973 (Pistoia, Italy)
- Running time: 113 minutes
- Country: Italy
- Languages: Italian; Vietnamese

Milarepa is a 1973 Italian drama film directed by Liliana Cavani. The film tells the story of the famous Tibetan yogi and poet Milarepa.

== Cast ==
- Lajos Balázsovits as Leo Milarepa
- Paolo Bonacelli as Prof. Bennet
- Marisa Fabbri as Milarepa's mother
- Marcella Michelangeli as Karin
- George Wang

== Production and release ==
Milarepa was shot in Abruzzo in autumn 1972 and premiered in Pistoia, Italy, on 28 December 1973. It was released in January 1974 and aired on television in June the same year.

The film was screened in competition at the 1974 Cannes Film Festival.

== Reception ==
Milarepa received mostly positive reviews by Italian critics, including Pier Paolo Pasolini (who titled it a "truly beautiful film"), Alberto Moravia and Lino Miccichè. Still, some reviewers were critical of the film, like Francesco Savio of Il mondo, who dismissed it as "unnecessary" and "purely decorative".

== Awards ==
- 1973 Carpine d'oro
