= The Confrontation (film) =

1969 film

- DVD cover
- Directed by: Miklós Jancsó
- Written by: Gyula Hernádi; Miklós Jancsó
- Produced by: József Bajusz; Ottó Föld
- Starring: Andrea Drahota
- Cinematography: Tamás Somló
- Edited by: Zoltán Farkas
- Music by: Paul Arma
- Release date: 6 February 1969
- Running time: 82 minutes
- Country: Hungary
- Language: Hungarian

The Confrontation (Hungarian: Fényes szelek,, literally "Sparkling Winds", the name of a revolutionary song) is a 1969 Hungarian drama film directed by Miklós Jancsó. Filmed in and around the Benedictine Pannonhalma Archabbey, it is set (despite its colorful modern dress) in 1947, during the Second Hungarian Republic. The plot involves tensions between leaders of a student revolutionary group (People's National Association of Colleges or NÉKOSZ) that takes over the Benedictine High School of Pannonhalma: Laci believes in befriending and convincing the high school students, but Jutka tries to resort to revolutionary terror. Both are deposed by the plainclothes police who have been complicit in the takeover.

The film is shot in Jancsó's characteristic long takes and makes extensive use of song. It was listed to compete at the 1968 Cannes Film Festival, but the festival was cancelled due to the events of May 1968 in France.

== Cast ==
- Andrea Drahota as Jutka Lantos
- Kati Kovács as Teri Szabó
- Lajos Balázsovits as Laci Fekete
- András Kozák as András Kozma
- András Bálint as András, Jewish boy
- József Madaras as Father Kellér
- István Uri as Pista
- Tibor Orbán as Schoolmaster
- Adrienne Csengery as College girl
- Miklós Csányi as Miki
- Ferenc Deák B. as János
