= Passion (1998 film) =

1998 film

- Directed by: György Fehér
- Written by: György Fehér; Béla Tarr
- Based on: The Postman Always Rings Twice by James M. Cain
- Produced by: István Dárday; György Fehér; Gergely Horváth; Ferenc Kardos; Éva Schulze; Jolán Árvai
- Starring: Ildikó Bánsági
- Cinematography: Miklós Gurbán; Tibor Máthé
- Edited by: Mária Czeilik; Éva Szentandrási
- Production companies: Budapest Filmstúdió; Magyar Televízió; MTV–FMS
- Distributed by: Budapest Film
- Release date: 22 October 1998
- Running time: 155 minutes
- Country: Hungary
- Language: Hungarian

Passion (Hungarian: Szenvedély) is a 1998 Hungarian drama film directed by György Fehér and co-written with Béla Tarr, based on James M. Cain's 1934 novel The Postman Always Rings Twice.

The film screened in the Un Certain Regard section at the 1998 Cannes Film Festival, and was awarded six prizes at the 1998 Hungarian Film Week, including best film, best direction, best cinematography, best actress (Ildikó Bánsági), best actor(s) (Djoko Rosic and János Derzsi), and the Foreign Film Critics' Gene Moskowitz prize.

== Cast ==
- Ildikó Bánsági as The wife
- Djoko Rosic as The husband
- János Derzsi as The man
- István Lénárt as The attorney
- László Gálffi as The priest
- Zoltán Bezerédi as The doctor's scribe (as Bezerédi Zoltán)
- Géza Bereményi as The doctor
- Dénes Ujlaky
- Péter Haumann as The lawyer
- Gergõ Borhi
- Imre Csuja
- Gábor Székely
- Tibor Viczkó
