= A Rózsa énekei =

A rózsa énekei
- Film poster
- Directed by: Andor Szilágyi
- Written by: Andor Szilágyi
- Starring: Franco Castellano; David Zum; Ildikó Bánsági; Djoko Rosic
- Cinematography: Elemér Ragályi
- Distributed by: Grantfilm Ltd.
- Release date: 20 March 2003
- Running time: 98 minutes
- Country: Hungary
- Language: Hungarian

A rózsa énekei is a 2003 film about Holocaust victims in Hungary during World War II.

== Reception ==
A rózsa énekei received a Special Jury Mention at the Karlovy Vary International Film Festival in 2003.
