= The Assistant (1982 film) =

1982 film

- Directed by: Zoro Zahon
- Written by: Zoro Zahon; Ladislav Ballek
- Starring: Gábor Koncz
- Cinematography: Dodo Simoncic
- Release date: 1982
- Running time: 94 minutes
- Country: Czechoslovakia
- Language: Slovak

The Assistant (Slovak: Pomocník) is a 1982 Czechoslovak drama film directed by Zoro Zahon. The film was selected as the Czechoslovak entry for the Best Foreign Language Film at the 55th Academy Awards, but was not accepted as a nominee.

== Cast ==
- Gábor Koncz as Valent Lancaric
- Elo Romančík as Riecan
- Ildikó Pécsi as Mrs. Riecan
- Marta Sládecková as Eva Riecanová
- Ivan Mistrík as Dobrik
- Milan Kis as Filadelfi
- József Ropog as Torok
- Hana Talpová as Vilma
- Július Satinský as Dr. Bielik

== See also ==
- List of submissions to the 55th Academy Awards for Best Foreign Language Film
- List of Czechoslovak submissions for the Academy Award for Best Foreign Language Film
