= The Barbarian (song) =

Instrumental by Emerson, Lake & Palmer

from the album Emerson, Lake & Palmer
- Released: 1970
- Recorded: 1970
- Genre: Progressive rock; heavy metal
- Length: 4:27
- Composer(s): Béla Bartók arr. Keith Emerson, Greg Lake, Carl Palmer
- Producer(s): Greg Lake

"The Barbarian" is the opening track on the eponymous debut album of British progressive rock band Emerson, Lake & Palmer, released in 1970.

== Description ==
This piece of music is instrumental, and it is the shortest one on the album (4:27). Although the composition of "The Barbarian" was attributed to the three band members, it is an arrangement for rock band of Béla Bartók’s 1911 piano piece Allegro barbaro. Although the original piece is for piano only, the band arranged the song for organ, piano, bass, and drums. The music of the song is aggressive with a heavy metal style. Greg Lake used a fuzz box to give his bass a fuller, guitar-like sound. The band members did not give credit to Bartók, thinking that the label would arrange the matter. Bartók's family sued ELP for copyright infringement, but eventually, the band gave equal credit to Bartók.

== Personnel ==
- Keith Emerson - Hammond organ, piano
- Greg Lake - bass guitar
- Carl Palmer - drums, gong
