= Julia Nyakó =

Hungarian actress (1963–2026)

Júlia Nyakó
- Born: 8 February 1963; Debrecen, Hungary
- Died: 20 June 2026 (aged 63)
- Education: University of Theatre and Film Arts in Budapest (no degree)
- Occupation: Actress

Júlia Nyakó (8 February 1963 – 20 June 2026) was a Hungarian actress.

A dropout of the University of Theatre and Film Arts in Budapest, she gained notoriety on the stage at Szigligeti Theatre.

Nyakó died on 20 June 2026, at the age of 63.

== Filmography ==
- Köszönöm, megvagyunk (1981)
- Season of Monsters (1987)
- On Body and Soul (2017)
- Genesis (2018)
