= Budapest Tales =

1976 film

- Directed by: István Szabó
- Written by: István Szabó
- Starring: Ági Mészáros
- Cinematography: Sándor Sára
- Edited by: János Rózsa
- Release date: 1976
- Running time: 90 minutes
- Country: Hungary
- Language: Hungarian

Budapest Tales (Hungarian: Budapesti mesék) is a 1976 Hungarian drama film directed by István Szabó. It was entered into the 1977 Cannes Film Festival.

== Cast ==
- Ági Mészáros as Fényes' Mother
- Maja Komorowska as Girl Who Knows the Colors
- Franciszek Pieczka
- András Bálint as Fényes
- Károly Kovács
- Ildikó Bánsági as Widow
- József Madaras as Soldier
- Szymon Szurmiej
- Zoltán Huszárik
- Rita Békés
- Irén Bódis
- Vilmos Kun as The Barber
- Sándor Halmágyi
- Janos Jani
