= Đoko Rosić =

Bulgarian actor

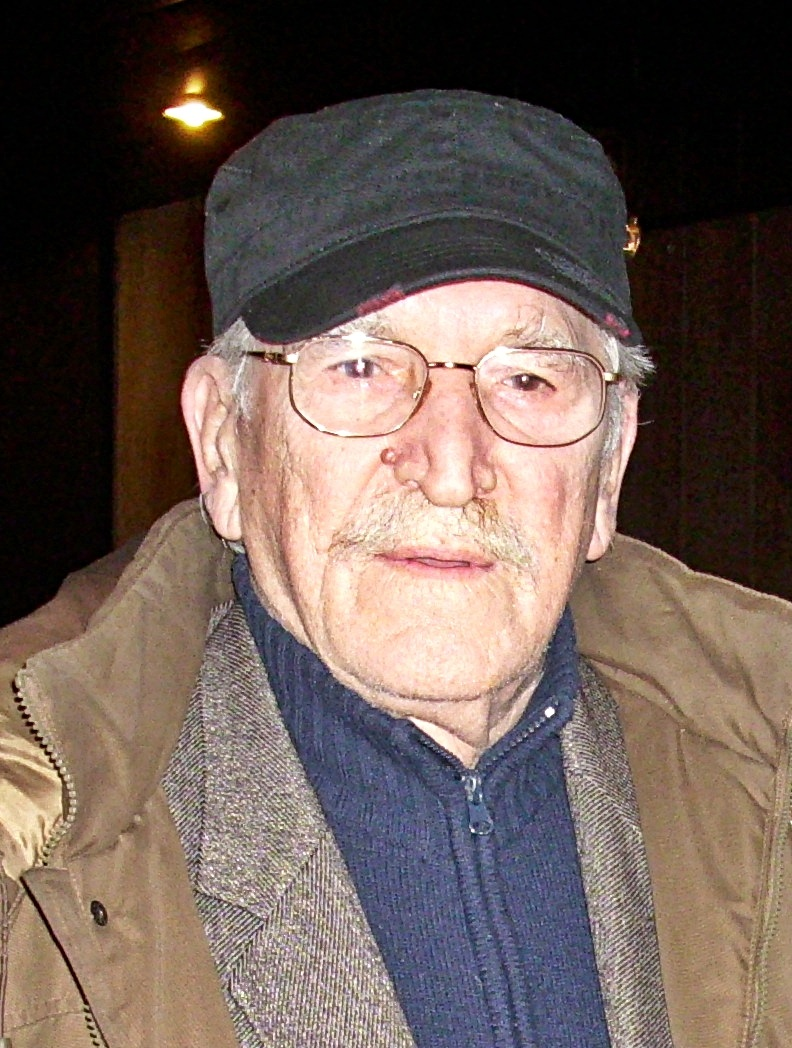
- Born: Đorđe Rosić; 28 February 1932; Krupanj, Drina Banovina, Kingdom of Yugoslavia
- Died: 21 February 2014 (aged 81); Sofia, Bulgaria
- Occupation: Actor
- Years active: 1969-2012
- Spouse(s): Zanka Alexandrova; Liliana Lazarova (1965-2014) (his death) (2 children)
- Children: Irina Rosic; Stoyan Kolev (stepchild)

Đorđe "Đoko" Rosić (Bulgarian: Джоко Росич, romanized: Dzhoko Rosich, Serbian Cyrillic: Ђоко Росић; 28 February 1932 – 21 February 2014) was a Serbian-Bulgarian actor who was also well known in Hungary.

== Biography ==
=== Early life, education and career ===
Rosić was born in Krupanj, Kingdom of Yugoslavia (today in western Serbia) to a Serbian father and a Bulgarian mother. At age 19 in 1951, he emigrated to Bulgaria for political reasons. He graduated from what is today the University of National and World Economy in Sofia in 1957. He worked as a Bulgarian National Radio journalist for 17 years, after first being invited to work in radio because of his deep voice. Rosić shot his first film in 1963. From that time until his death in 2014 he appeared in over 110 movies, mostly Bulgarian productions, but also a large number of Hungarian films.

=== Personal life ===
He was married two times. First wife - Zanka Alexandrova. Second wife Liliana Lazarova. His only child is the Bulgarian drama actress Irina Rosic, but he also had a step son from his second wife's first marriage - Stoyan Kolev. Rosic has two grandsons - Valentin Hristov, George Sabev and two step granddaughters Maria Koleva, Plamena Koleva. He also has one great-grandson Branimir Hristov (Branko) and a great granddaughter Jovana Hristova.

=== Death ===
Rosić died on 21 February 2014 from complications after a brain tumor surgery. He was 81.

== Selected filmography ==
Year	Film			Role	Notes
Year	English title	Bulgarian title	Transliteration	Role	Notes
1969	The Eighth	Осмият	Osmiyat	Petar	
1970	Aesop	Езоп	Ezop	Kres' messenger	
1974	My Father the House-Painter	Баща ми бояджията	Bashta mi boyadzhiyata		
1979	Hungarian Rhapsody				
1980	The Truck	Камионът	Kamionat	Chitanugata	
1981	Aszparuh				
1981	The Queen of Turnovo	Търновската царица	Tarnovskata tzaritza	Papaymayka	
1981	Captain Petko Voivode	Капитан Петко войвода	Kapitan Petko Voyvoda		TV series written by Nikolay Haytov
1982	Macbeth				
1984	681 AD: The Glory of Khan	681 - Величието на хана	681 - Velichieto na hana		
1986	The Judge	Съдията	Sadiyata	Stoyo Manchev	
1988	Time of Violence	Време разделно	Vreme razdelno	Karahasan	
1993	Jonah Who Lived in the Whale				
1997	Gypsy Lore				
1998	Passion				
2000	Werckmeister Harmonies				
2001	The Mystery of Black Rose Castle				TV series
2003	A Rózsa énekei				
2007	The End				
