= Via degli specchi =

1982 film

- Film poster
- Directed by: Giovanna Gagliardo
- Written by: Giovanna Gagliardo; Jean Gruault
- Produced by: Claudio Bioni; Roberto Levi
- Starring: Nicole Garcia
- Cinematography: Camillo Bazzoni
- Edited by: Francesco Bronzi
- Music by: Pino Donaggio
- Release date: 1982
- Running time: 82 minutes
- Country: Italy
- Language: Italian

Via degli specchi is a 1982 Italian crime-drama film directed by Giovanna Gagliardo. It was entered into the 33rd Berlin International Film Festival.

== Cast ==
- Nicole Garcia as Francesca
- Milva as Veronica
- Heinz Bennent as Gianfranco
- Claudio Bigagli as Giuseppe
- Massimo Serato as Councillor Bianchi
- Adèle Aste
- Carlo Cartier
- Rita Frei
- Girolamo Marzano
- Cristina Rinaldi (as Adele Cristina Rinaldi)

== See also ==
- List of Italian films of 1982
