= Forbidden Relations =

1983 film

- Film poster
- Directed by: Zsolt Kézdi-Kovács
- Written by: Zsolt Kézdi-Kovács
- Starring: Lili Monori
- Cinematography: János Kende
- Edited by: Éva Kármentő
- Release date: 22 September 1983
- Running time: 92 minutes
- Country: Hungary
- Language: Hungarian

Forbidden Relations (Hungarian: Visszaesők) is a 1983 Hungarian drama film directed by Zsolt Kézdi-Kovács. It was entered into the 1983 Cannes Film Festival.

== Cast ==
- Lili Monori - Juli
- Miklós Székely B. - György
- Mari Törőcsik - Juli anyja
- György Bánffy - Körzeti orvos
- József Horváth - Juli apja
- Tibor Molnár - Pista bácsi
- László Horváth - Lőrinc, rendőr
- Ferenc Paláncz - Kálmán
- József Tóth - Zoli
- Mária Bajcsay - Bírónő
- Klára Leviczki
- Judit Balog - Erzsi
- Ferenc Némethy - Elnök
- László Horesnyi
- Júlia Nyakó - Monika (as Nyakó Juli)
