= András Bálint =

Hungarian actor

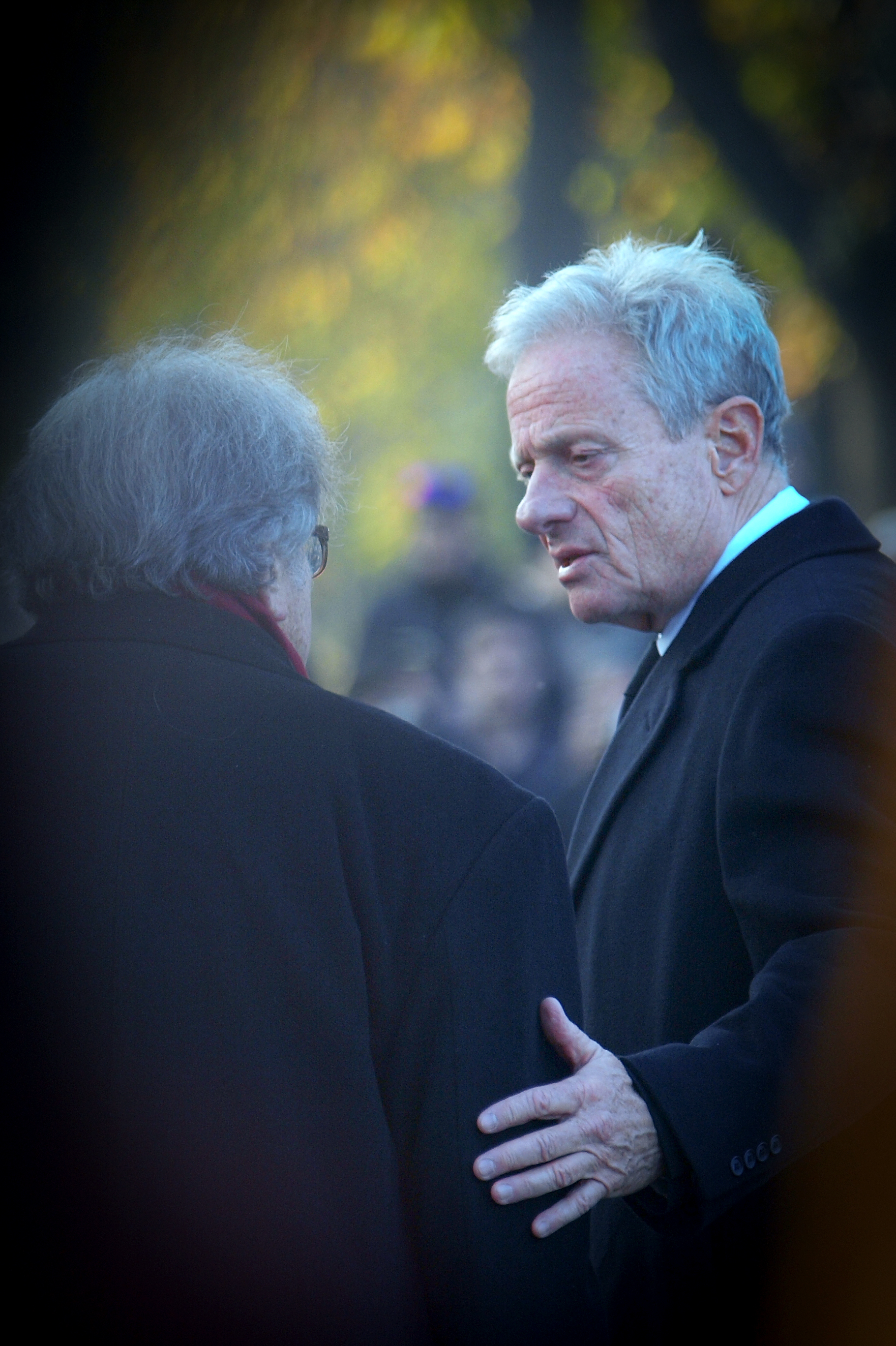
- Born: 26 April 1943 (age 83); Pécs, Hungary
- Occupation: Actor
- Years active: 1958–present

András Bálint (born 26 April 1943) is a Hungarian actor. He has appeared in more than 75 films and television shows since 1958.

== Selected filmography ==
- Father (1966)
- The Confrontation (1969)
- Szerelmesfilm (1970)
- Trotta (1971)
- 141 Minutes from the Unfinished Sentence (1975)
- Budapest Tales (1976)
- Colonel Redl (1985)
- The Red Countess (1985)
- Season of Monsters (1987)
- Jesus Christ's Horoscope (1989)
- Stalin (1992)
- An American Girl: Grace Stirs Up Success (2015)
