= The Mystery of Black Rose Castle =

- German DVD cover
- Genre: Adventure / Children / Fantasy / Action / Family / Comedy
- Written by: Katalin Petényi; Charles Newcomb
- Directed by: Barna Kabay; Katalin Petényi; Charles Newcomb
- Starring: Travis Kisgen; James Schanzer
- Composer: Joseph Metcalfe
- Countries of origin: United Kingdom; Hungary
- Original languages: English; Hungarian
- No. of seasons: 1
- No. of episodes: 13

Production
- Executive producer: Larry Brody
- Producers: Larry Brody; Barna Kabay; Thomas Bretschneider
- Cinematography: Tibor Máthé
- Editor: Mari Miklós
- Running time: 25 minutes

Original release
- Release: August 29, 2001 – November 2001

The Mystery of Black Rose Castle is a scripted 13-part television miniseries. It was originally broadcast on Australia's ABC at 11:35am on Wednesdays. In Germany, the series premiered on 08.02.2003 on KI.KA, and ran on Saturday mornings at 13:10, while reruns have occurred on the German channels ARD, MDR television, RBB TV, and Hesse Television. The show is rated G. In Hungary, it is known as "A Black Rose vár titka", and in Germany it is called "Das Geheimnis von Black Rose Castle".

== Production ==
Filming took place between 15 May to 14 July 2000 in Hungary, Kriebstein, Rochlitz, and Königsee.

Stunts were done by professional stuntmen.

== Synopsis ==
The website BoyActors describes the synopsis of the miniseries thus:

Set deep within the German Alps in a medieval castle. Bobby, Martin and Fiona arrive to spend their vacation with Lord Lennox, Bobby's granddad, a charismatic scientist who wants to save prehistoric animals and extend human life. The boys explore every inch of the castle, the spooky vaults and secret passageways... at night they see a mysterious Knight in Armour with supernatural strength, galloping out of nowhere and fading back into the mist...

— BoyActors,

== Cast ==
The cast is as follows:

- Travis Kisgen - Bobby
- James Schanzer - Martin
- Djoko Rosic - Lord Lennox
- Megan Casey - Fiona
- Dan Metcalfe (as Daniel Alexander) - Smith
- David Markey - Mr. Ross
- Hope Alexander-Willis - Aunt Elizabeth
- Josh Wolford - John Drummond
- Sepp Schauer - Mr. Drummond
- Howard S. Miller - Jardins
- Wolfgang S. Zechmayer
- Robin Daglish
- John Rado - The Cook

== Episodes ==
Note: The titles of the episodes have been translated from a German website.

1. The Magic City (aired 08.02.03 in Germany)
2. The Strange Intruder (aired 15.02.03 in Germany)
3. The Tangible Secrets (aired 22.02.03 in Germany)
4. The Monstrous Adventure (aired 01.03.03 in Germany)
5. The Nighttime Attack (aired 08.03.03 in Germany)
6. The Mysterious Creature (aired 15.03.03 in Germany)
7. The Miraculous Arrows (aired 22.03.03 in Germany)
8. The Magic Horseshoe (aired 29.03.03 in Germany)
9. The Unique Animals (aired 05.04.03 in Germany)
10. The Mysterious Knight (aired 12.04.03 in Germany)
11. The Bitter Struggle (aired 19.04.03 in Germany)
12. The Missing Family Treasure (aired 26.04.03 in Germany)
13. The Great Triumph (aired 03.05.03 in Germany)

== Release ==
The show was released onto DVD in Region 1 on 2004-02-10. Special features include: a making of featurette, interviews with the cast and crew, lists of biographies, and trailers.

== Reception ==
The German website new-video gave the series a rating of 2.5 stars out of 5.0, based on 2 user votes. This was broken down into 2.5 for action, 2 for thrills, 2 for humour, 2 for eroticism, and 2 for emotion - rounded up.

The site Imhonet gave the series a rating of 6.3 out of 10, based on 3 users.

The Turkish site gives the series a rating of 30% based on 64 ratings.

== Spin-offs ==
A 93-minute UK/Hungarian family film based on the TV series was released in 2001, and a German/Hungarian 65 minute one was also released in the same year. The first film was given an average rating of 1.62 out of 5 based on 8 votes, on the Dutch site MovieMeter.
