= Private Vices, Public Pleasures =

1976 film

- Theatrical release poster
- Directed by: Miklós Jancsó
- Written by: Giovanna Gagliardo
- Produced by: Giancarlo Marchetti; Monica Venturini
- Starring: Lajos Balázsovits; Pamela Villoresi
- Cinematography: Tomislav Pinter
- Edited by: Roberto Perpignani
- Music by: Francesco De Masi
- Release date: 26 May 1976
- Running time: 104 minutes
- Countries: Italy; Yugoslavia
- Language: Italian

Private Vices, Public Pleasures (Italian: Vizi privati, pubbliche virtù; Hungarian: Magánbűnök, közerkölcsök) is a 1976 Italian-Yugoslavian erotic drama film directed by Miklós Jancsó. It was entered into the 1976 Cannes Film Festival. The film is based on the Mayerling incident but presents a "highly-eroticised" depiction of the events.

== Cast ==
- Lajos Balázsovits as Crown Prince Rudolf
- Pamela Villoresi as Sofia
- Franco Branciaroli as Duke
- Teresa Ann Savoy as Mary Vetsera
- Laura Betti as Therese
- Ivica Pajer as General
- Zvonimir Crnko
- Umberto Silva
- Demeter Bitenc
- Susanna Javicoli
- Anikó Sáfár
- Ilona Staller as woman in orgy
- Gloria Piedimonte
