= The Round-Up (1966 film) =

- DVD cover
- Directed by: Miklós Jancsó
- Written by: Gyula Hernádi
- Starring: János Görbe; Zoltán Latinovits; Tibor Molnár
- Cinematography: Tamás Somló
- Edited by: Zoltán Farkas
- Production company: Mafilm
- Release date: 6 January 1966
- Running time: 95 minutes
- Country: Hungary
- Language: Hungarian

The Round-Up (Hungarian: Szegénylegények, "Poor young men", i. e. outlaws) is a 1966 Hungarian film directed by Miklós Jancsó. Well received in its home country, it was Jancsó's first film to receive international acclaim.

Today, many consider The Round-Up a classic of world cinema; it was selected to be screened in the Cannes Classics section of the 2015 Cannes Film Festival.

== Plot ==
Following the quelling of Lajos Kossuth's 1848 revolution against Habsburg rule in Hungary, prison camps were set up for people suspected of being Kossuth's supporters. Around 20 years later, some members of highwayman Sándor Rózsa's guerrilla band, believed to be some of Kossuth's last supporters, are known to be interned among the prisoners in a camp. The prison staff try to identify the rebels and find out if Sándor is among them using various means of mental and physical torture and trickery. When one of the guerrillas, János Gajdar, is identified as a murderer by an old woman, he starts aiding his captors by acting as an informant. Gajdar is told that if he can show his captors a man who has killed more people than himself, he will be spared. Fearing for his life, he turns in several people his captors have been looking for by name but unable to identify among the prisoners.

Eventually Gajdar becomes an outcast among the prisoners, and is murdered at night by some of his fellow inmates while in solitary confinement. The prison guards easily discover suspects, people whose cells had been left unlocked for the night, and start interrogating them in the hope of finding Sándor himself. The suspects are tricked into revealing the remaining guerrillas when they are given a chance to form a new military unit out of former bandits and informed that Sándor, who was not among the prisoners, has been pardoned. However, the celebrating guerrillas are then told that those who previously fought under him will still face execution.

== Cast ==
- János Görbe as János Gajdar
- Zoltán Latinovits as Imre Veszelka
- Tibor Molnár as Kabai
- Gábor Agárdy as Torma (as Agárdy Gábor)
- András Kozák as Ifj. Kabai
- Béla Barsi as Foglár
- József Madaras as Magyardolmányos
- János Koltai as Béla Varju
- István Avar as Vallató I
- Lajos Őze as Vallató II

== Production ==
The Round-Up was produced by the Hungarian state film production company Mafilm. It had a budget of 17 million forints, or around half a million US$ at the exchange rates of the time. The screenplay was written by Hungarian author Gyula Hernádi, who Jancsó had met in 1959 and who was a frequent collaborator with the director until Hernádi's death in 2005. The film was shot in anamorphic widescreen (Agascope) in black and white by another regular Jancsó collaborator, Tamás Somló.

The Round-Up does not exhibit many of Jancsó's trademark elements to the degree evident later: thus, the takes are comparatively short and although the camera movements are carefully choreographed they do not exhibit the elaborate fluid style that would become distinctive in later films. The film does, though, use Jancsó's favourite setting, the Hungarian puszta (steppe), shot in characteristically oppressive sunlight. The film has little dialogue and rarely shows any emotion in its characters. It has been called by one critic as "a total absorption of content into form".

== Release ==
A 4K restoration from the original 35mm negative, done by the National Film Institute Hungary, played for the first time at the 2021 New York Film Festival. A collection of Miklós Jancsó's films, including The Round-Up, was released on Blu-ray in April 2022 by Kino Lorber.

== Critical reception ==
The film was well received by audiences on its initial release in Hungary. During its theatrical run, the film was seen by over a million people, in a country with a population of around ten million at the time. The film was selected as the Hungarian entry for the Best Foreign Language Film at the 39th Academy Awards, but was not accepted as a nominee.

The Round-Up was Jancsó's first film to also receive international attention. In 1966, it was the first of five films by the director to be entered in the competition category of the Cannes Film Festival, but was not selected for any awards. The brutal, dictatorial methods depicted in the film were read by local audiences as a partial allegory for the clampdown that happened following Hungary's failed 1956 uprising against the Soviet Union. Therefore, before Jancsó was allowed to screen the film in Cannes, he had to make a declaration stating the film had nothing to do with the recent events in the country, even though he later said that "everybody knew it wasn't true". Later in 1966, the film was released in the United Kingdom, and in 1969, it received a limited release in the United States.

The film was included in Béla Tarr's list of the 10 greatest films of all time submitted to the 2012 Sight & Sound poll, as well as Derek Malcolm's The Century of Films, a list of 100 of the critic's favorite movies from the 20th century. It was also chosen to be part both of Budapest Twelve, a list of Hungarian films considered the best in 1968 and its follow-up, the New Budapest Twelve in 2000. In 2022, filmmaker Barry Jenkins listed it in his top ten favorite films for Sight and Sound.

== See also ==
- List of submissions to the 39th Academy Awards for Best Foreign Language Film
- List of Hungarian submissions for the Academy Award for Best Foreign Language Film
