= Zsolt Kézdi-Kovács =

Hungarian film director

- Born: 1 June 1936; Petrovgrad (now Zrenjanin), Vojvodina, Serbia, Yugoslavia
- Died: 7 September 2014 (aged 78)
- Occupations: Film director Screenwriter
- Years active: 1961–2004

Zsolt Kézdi-Kovács (1 June 1936 – 7 September 2014) was a Hungarian film director and screenwriter. He directed 19 films between 1961 and 2004. His film Forbidden Relations was entered into competition at the 1983 Cannes Film Festival.

== Selected filmography ==
- Story of a Coward (Short 1966)
- Temperate Zone (Mérsékelt Égöv) (1970)
- Romanticism (1972)
- A locsolókocsi (1973)
- When Joseph Returns (1976)
- A Nice Neighbor (1979)
- A remény joga (1982)
- Forbidden Relations (1983)
- Rejtőzködő (1986)
- Kiáltás és kiáltás (1988)
- És mégis (1991)
- Az a nap a mienk (Documentary 2002)
