= Jesus Christ's Horoscope =

1989 film

- Directed by: Miklós Jancsó
- Written by: Gyula Hernádi; Miklós Jancsó
- Starring: Juli Básti
- Cinematography: János Kende
- Release dates: July 1989 (Moscow); 12 October 1989
- Running time: 90 minutes
- Country: Hungary
- Language: Hungarian

Jesus Christ's Horoscope (Hungarian: Jézus Krisztus horoszkópja) is a 1989 Hungarian drama film directed by Miklós Jancsó. It was entered into the 16th Moscow International Film Festival.

== Cast ==
- Juli Básti as Juli
- György Cserhalmi as Jozef K.
- Ildikó Bánsági as Márta
- Dorottya Udvaros as Kata
- András Bálint as Nyomozó
- László Gálffi as Nyomozó
- András Kozák as Inspector
- Ottilia Borbáth as Matild
- György Fehér as Merse Zoltán

== Reception ==
The film was presented as follows, "(it) has a contemporary setting, and tells of the anguish of intellectuals who remained silent during a series of recent crises. The plot develops into an existential murder thriller, but the chaos of unsettled lives is coralled by Jansco's unique film language (his weaving camera, long shots and long takes now complemented by the use of multiple video images) which lends the timelessness of classicism to all it touches."
