= Electra, My Love =

1974 film

- Directed by: Miklós Jancsó
- Written by: László Gyurkó; Gyula Hernádi
- Starring: Mari Törőcsik
- Cinematography: János Kende
- Edited by: Zoltán Farkas
- Release date: 12 December 1974
- Running time: 70 minutes
- Country: Hungary
- Language: Hungarian

Electra, My Love (Hungarian: Szerelmem, Elektra) is a 1974 Hungarian drama film directed by Miklós Jancsó. It was included in the official selection for the 1975 Cannes Film Festival. Like most of Jancsó's films, this one uses extremely long takes, often as long as the camera would allow without stopping because of the film stock finishing. The entire 70 minute duration is covered by just twelve takes.

The story is set in an archaic and mythical world in which a tyrant faces rebellion by the down-trodden. It is based on a play by László Gyurkó which premiered in Budapest in 1968, and which itself reinterpreted the Greek myth of Electra.

== Plot ==
Electra is bullied by Aegisthus, the tyrant who fifteen years earlier murdered her father, Agamemnon, and seized the throne. Electra is therefore filled with the urge to kill him and his supporters in revenge. To humiliate her, Aegisthus forces her to marry a dwarf.

Her brother, Orestes, then returns from abroad, disguised as a messenger reporting his own death. Electra kills him but he comes back to life. Electra and Orestes join with the people to depose Aegisthus. They capture him in a net, torture him, and have him shot.

A red helicopter lands: the siblings climb into it and fly off. The unexpected intrusion of twentieth century technology highlights the extent to which timeless political themes from a two thousand year old Greek myth resonate for an audience in contemporary Hungary.

== Cast ==
- Mari Törőcsik as Elektra (Electra)
- György Cserhalmi as Oresztész (Orestes)
- József Madaras as Aegisztosz (Aegisthus)
- Mária Bajcsay as Kikiáltó
- Lajos Balázsovits as Vezér
- József Bige
- Tamás Cseh
- György Delianisz
- Balázs Galkó
- Gabi Jobba as Krisotemis
- László Pelsőczy as Agamemnon

== Production ==
=== Script and sequencing ===
In the words of its director, the film is both a fairy tale and a "parable for the idea that revolutionaries must continually renew themselves". In "Electra, My Love" Jancsó said that he found himself dealing with issues that had arisen much closer to home, in Hungary "all too recently". He explained why he had changed the ending of the story: in his version Electra is not killed on account of her involvement in the murder of Agamemnon, because Jancsó did not think that the common people could be held responsible for the actions of their tyrannical ruler.

Restricting the film to just twelve very long "takes" affects its sequencing. The presentation is not rigidly chronological, nor, indeed, fixed by place: it could just as well be set in medieval Hungary or in ancient Greece. Co-author Gyula Hernádi described the setting as "approximately nomadic-agricultural mystical".

=== Filming ===
Filming actually took place in the Puszta grasslands, not far from Kunszentmiklós. A striking visual theme of the film is the shots of naked women, standing in rows in the background of the main action, or dancing. Each day during the filming, 500 film extras were collected from Budapest and taken by a special train and then in buses to the rural filming location. Despite not being paid for the overtime involved, they earned more as film extras than from working in a factory or shop. Often Jancsó would use the entire day for testing out different possibilities, but the filming itself (using Kodak film) took relatively little time. Most of the planned sequences were shot four or five times. The dialogues were retrospectively added and synchronised by the actors: final editing took just one day.

== Reception ==
Peter Day, writing in Sight & Sound in 1974, establishes that with "Electra, My Love" Jancsó reiterates his by now familiar plea for violent revolution as a way to liberate an oppressed society. But even if Jancsó cannot avoid the charge of repeating themes from his earlier films, his "Electra" is also a beautiful visual experience in its own terms, "familiar, yes, but dazzling and powerfully refined". The "virtuoso" camera work, making full use of a crane and rail-tracks for the moving shots, coupled with the careful inspired fluidity of camera movement integrated with the use of zooming and panning, deserve special mention. Jean de Baroncelli reviewed the film in Le Monde the same year and was less forgiving: "With the development of the political-mythical fable Jancsó lets go of cloying stage craft, preferring to concentrate on cinematic fluidity. Under the weight of theatrical references and a prolific blossoming of stiflingly overblown symbolism, the story-line risks disappearing in ridiculous mannerisms."

Dennis Schwartz, in a more contemporary review, gave the film a B+ grade, writing: "Jancsó through the Greek myth was able to transfer the tragedy to modern times and dispel any doubt about how the truth and lies were wound up in contradictions by the Soviets. The suppressed masses were so beaten down they no longer could decipher the truth, and therefore the world they saw was myopic and distorted. It made for a spellbinding film. The striking red-head Mari Töröcsik as Electra, gave a masterful performance that had conviction and a sense of urgency."

In addition to the critical reactions when it was released, a considered analysis is provided by Bryan Burns in his 1996 book on Hungarian Cinema. For Burns, "Electra, My Love" is one of the best things Jancsós has produced, and one of the most successful reworkings of a classical legend. Burns is particularly struck by the balletic fluidity of the actors and of the camera work. Flair and ingenuity are everywhere. The arrival at the end of the red helicopter as a symbol of a Marxist Utopia is a "masterly coup de théâtre, which can endow the audience with the same ecstatic optimism as the peasant farmers [in the film]" Elsewhere, in 2004 John Cunningham wrote that "Electra" represented the quintessence of Jancsó's work in the 1970s.
