= Red Psalm =

- DVD cover
- Directed by: Miklós Jancsó
- Written by: Gyula Hernádi
- Starring: József Madaras; Tibor Orbán
- Cinematography: János Kende
- Edited by: Zoltán Farkas
- Music by: Tamás Cseh
- Production company: Mafilm
- Release date: 1972
- Running time: 87 minutes
- Country: Hungary
- Language: Hungarian

Red Psalm (Hungarian: Még kér a nép) is a 1972 Hungarian film by Miklós Jancsó. The literal translation of the title is "And the People Still Ask", a quote from a poem by Sándor Petőfi.

== Plot ==
Red Psalm centers around a small peasants' revolt in 1890. It draws inspiration from the Hungarian revolutionary movements of the 19th century, including the Hungarian Revolution of 1848, of which Sándor Petőfi, the poet whose work the film's Hungarian title references, was a participant.

== Background ==
Like most of Jancsó's best-known works, Red Psalm is loosely based on events from Hungarian history. Shot in very long, carefully choreographed takes, the film features only 26 shots. Unlike Jancsó's previous films, which used music only sparsely, almost every scene in Red Psalm features music, usually performed by the on-screen characters. The songs include Hungarian folk music and songs in Russian and English, most famously "Charlie Is My Darling" (a variation on a Scots song later adopted during the American Civil War as the pro-Union "Johnny Is My Darling"). Due to this large number of songs and dances, the movie is sometimes described as a musical.

== Critical reception ==
Writing for the Chicago Reader, film critic Jonathan Rosenbaum argues that Red Psalm "may well be the greatest Hungarian film of the 60s and 70s." The Time Out Film Guide sees the film as an improvement over Jancsó's "opaque and difficult" Agnus Dei, praising Red Psalm as "crystal clear and involving: looking for a language in [Agnus Dei], he found it here and uses it with dazzling precision." Writing for the Chicago-based website Cine-File, Ignatiy Vishnevetsky describes the film as "an inversion of Jancsó's earlier work — and his most beautiful film."

Taking a contrary position, Roger Greenspun wrote in his 1972 New York Times review that "it is difficult to pinpoint the reasons for the incredible monotony of so much vigorous activity, but surely one reason is that nothing happens in Red Psalm except for the benefit of the camera...Nothing could be further, say, from the great fluid camera movements of a Max Ophuls than the elaborate cycles and epicycles of the Jancsó world, where everybody — open fields notwithstanding — is imprisoned within rigid limits of the director's rage for abstract patterns."

== Awards ==
Red Psalm won Jancsó the Best Director prize at the 1972 Cannes Film Festival and is considered one of his major works. Several critics, most notably the American Jonathan Rosenbaum, consider it his best film.
