= My Way Home (1965 film) =

- DVD cover
- Directed by: Miklós Jancsó
- Written by: Gyula Hernádi; Imre Vadász
- Starring: András Kozák; Sergei Nikonenko; Béla Barsy
- Release date: 14 January 1965
- Running time: 108 minutes

My Way Home (Hungarian: Így jöttem, pronounced [ˈiːɟ ˈjøtːɛm]) is a 1965 Hungarian drama film directed by Miklós Jancsó.

== Analysis ==
A presentation at the Budapest Music Center praised "this wonderfully lyrical film, which displays all of the director's consistent themes: the psychological presence of landscape, the randomness of violence, the arbitrary nature of power..." while Time Out noted that "This early (pre-Round-Up) Jancsó movie is apparently autobiographical in spirit if not in letter."
