= Giovanna Gagliardo =

Italian film director

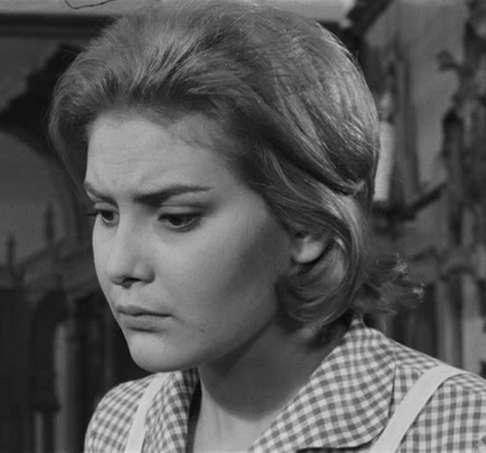
- Gagliardo in The Assassin (1961)
- Born: 12 December 1943 (age 82); Monticello d'Alba, Italy
- Occupations: Film director Screenwriter
- Years active: 1970-present

Giovanna Gagliardo (born 12 December 1943) is an Italian film director and screenwriter. Her 1982 film Via degli specchi was entered into the 33rd Berlin International Film Festival. She is also known as a longtime partner (1968–80) to major Hungarian film director Miklós Jancsó.

== Selected filmography ==
- The Assassin (1961)
- Private Vices, Public Pleasures (1976)
- Via degli specchi (1982)
