= István Kovács (actor) =

Hungarian actor

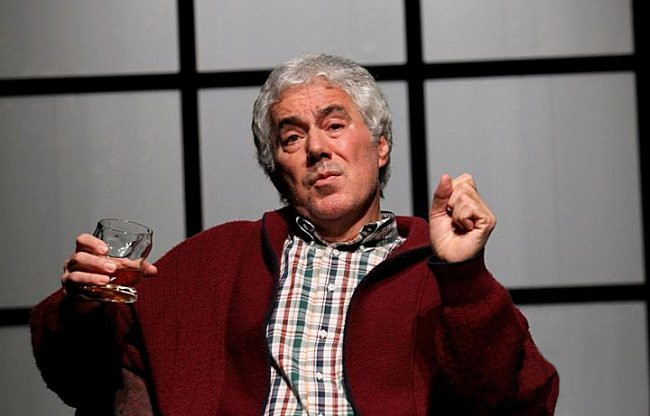
- Born: 7 May 1944 (age 82); Budapest, Hungary
- Occupation: Actor
- Years active: 1964-present

István Kovács (born 7 May 1944) is a Hungarian actor. He appeared in more than sixty films since 1964.

== Selected filmography ==
Year	Title	Role	Notes
1968	Stars of Eger	Gergely Bornemissza	
1979	Hungarian Rhapsody		
1981	A Pogány Madonna	Gábor Soltész	
