= Gábor Koncz =

Hungarian actor

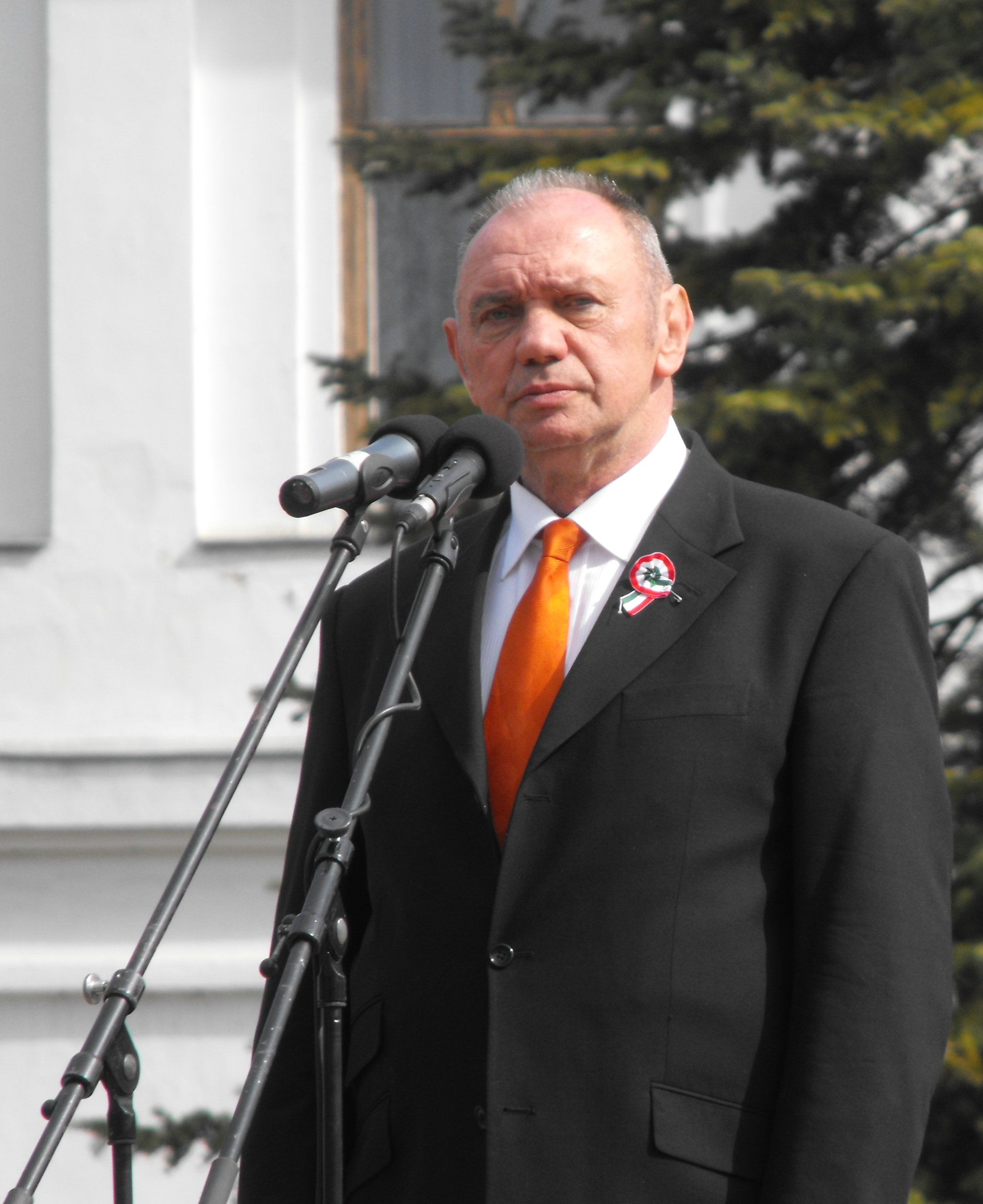
- Gábor Koncz in 2009.
- Born: 8 July 1938 (age 87); Mezőkeresztes, Hungary
- Occupation: Actor
- Years active: 1962 - present

Gábor Koncz (born 1938) is a Hungarian actor. In the US, he is well known for playing Vagran Rostavili, brother of the main antagonist Viktor Rostavili in Red Heat (1988).

== Selected filmography ==
- Tales of a Long Journey (1963)
- Germinal (1963)
- Háry János (1965)
- And Then The Guy... (1966)
- Three Nights of Love (1967)
- Stars of Eger (1968)
- Pikemen (1975)
- Hungarians (1978)
- Hungarian Rhapsody (1979)
- The Assistant (1982)
- Do not Panic, Major Kardos (1982)
- Red Heat (1988)
- Metamorphosis (2007)
- The Door (2012)

== Bibliography ==
- Burns, Bryan. World Cinema: Hungary. Fairleigh Dickinson University Press, 1996.
