= Ildikó Bánsági =

Hungarian actress (born 1947)

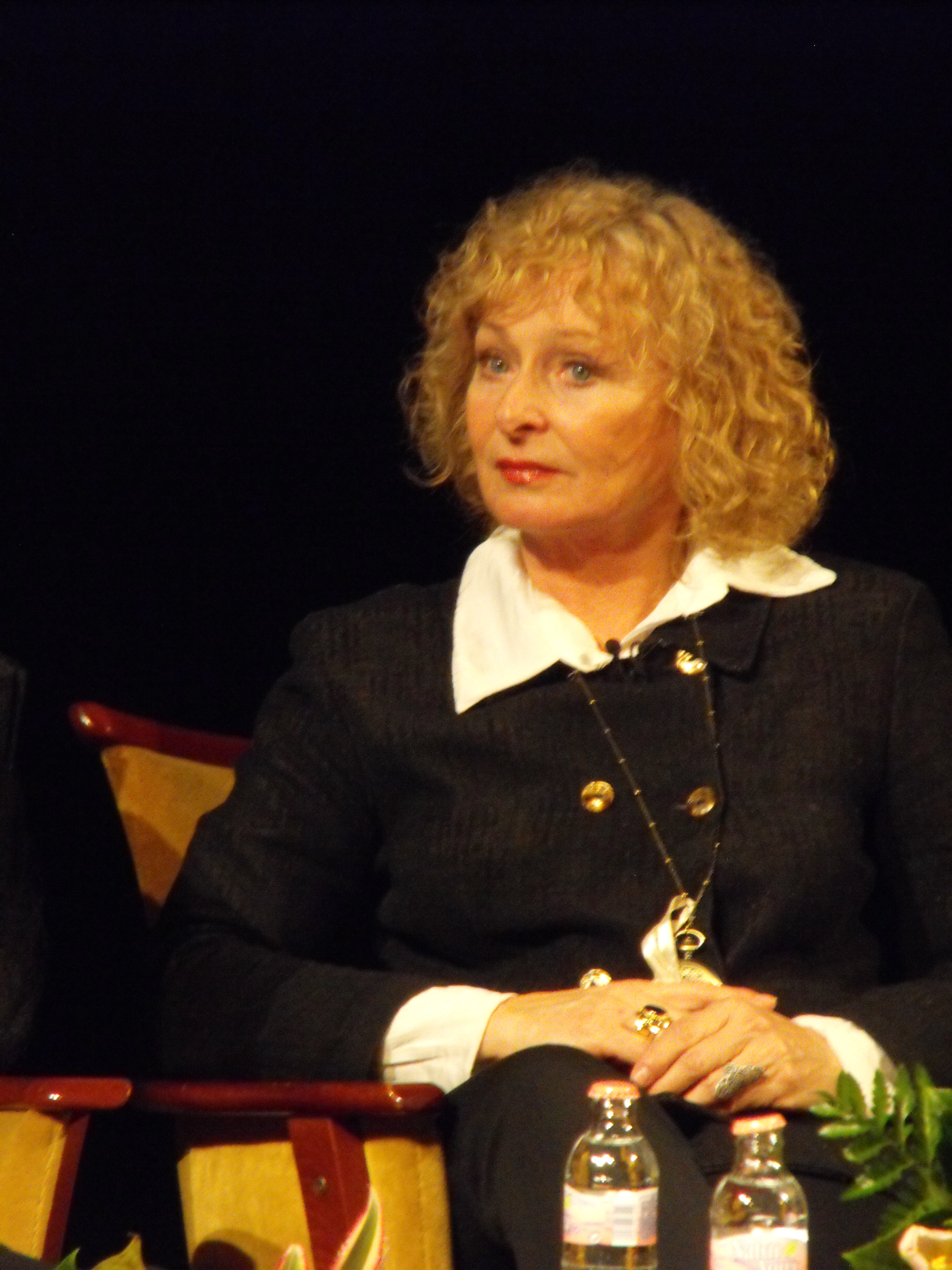
- Bánsági in 2010
- Born: 19 October 1947 (age 79); Budapest, Hungary
- Occupation: Actress
- Years active: 1971–present

Ildikó Bánsági (born 19 October 1947) is a Hungarian actress, Kossuth Prize and Jászai Mari Award winner, member of the Halhatatlanok Társulata, full member of the Magyar Művészeti Akadémia.

She has appeared in more than 80 films since 1966. She starred in the film Passion, which was screened in the Un Certain Regard section at the 1998 Cannes Film Festival.

== Career ==
She graduated from the Budapest Hámán Kató Girls' High School in 1966. Between 1966 and 1968 she worked in the Studio of the National Theatre. From 1968 she attended Zsuzsa Simon's class at the Academy of Theatre and Film Arts, and after graduating in 1972 she was engaged by the Csokonai Theatre in Debrecen. Between 1973 and 1976 as well as between 1987 and 1990 she worked at the József Attila Színház. Between 1976 and 1987 she was an actress at the Vígszínház, then from 1990 to 1993 at the National Theatre, from 1993 to 1996 at the Művész Színház and between 1996 and 1997 at the Thália Színház. In 1996 and 1997 she was a member of the Thália Társulat. From 1997-1998 she was an actress of the Kelemen László Színkör. From 1998 to 2013 she was a member of the Új Színház. From 2013 to 2020, she was again a member of the National Theatre. Since 2014, she has been a full member of the Magyar Művészeti Akadémia.

== Personal life ==
Her parents met in a Soviet prisoner-of-war camp, where her father was a prisoner and her Russian future mother, Natalia Lerasova, was a nurse. After the end of the World War II, they found each other again in Hungary on an adventurous path. Later, her father, Károly Bánsági, became a sailor and her mother became a Russian language teacher in Hungary, and after a while they divorced.

Her first husband was film director András Jeles, from whom she divorced. Her second husband was Sándor Gáspár, an actor, and they had a son and a daughter.

Their son Gergely Gáspár (or Gergő, 1982) is a drummer. Their daughter, Kata Gáspár (1987), follows her parents' profession. Bánsági has one brother, Károly Bánsági.

== Awards ==
- Varsányi Irén-emlékgyűrű (1979)
- Jászai Mari-díj (1981)
- Ajtay Andor-emlékdíj (1985)
- Magyar Filmszemle díj (1987)
- Erzsébet-díj (1987, 1990)
- Magyar Filmkritikusok Díja (1988)
- Új magyar hangjáték-színészi díj, a Magyar Rádió nívódíja (1990)
- Kossuth Prize / Kossuth-díj (1996)
- Magyar Filmszemle díj - a legjobb női főszereplő (1998)
- Sík Ferenc-nívódíj (2008)
- Halhatatlanok Társulata, örökös tag (2009)
- Páger Antal-színészdíj (2010)
- A Nemzet Művésze (2014)
- Prima díj (2014)
- Magyar Művészeti Akadémia, rendes tag (2014)
- Arany Medál Életműdíj (2015)
- A Magyar Filmakadémia életműdíja (2019)

== Filmography ==
=== Feature films ===
- Madárkák (1971)
- Végre hétfő! (1971)
- Szindbád (1971)
- Makra (1972)
- Voyage with Jacob / Utazás Jakabbal (1972)
- Lányarcok tükörben (1973)
- Álljon meg a menet! (1973)
- Szikrázó lányok (1974)
- Jelbeszéd (1974)
- Ereszd el a szakállamat! (1975)
- Kopjások (1975)
- Fekete gyémántok I-II. (1976)
- Budapest Tales / Budapesti mesék (1976)
- Egyszeregy (1978)
- Utolsó előtti ítélet (1979)
- Élve vagy halva (1979)
- Confidence / Bizalom (1979)
- Kojak Budapesten (1980)
- Mephisto (1981)
- Napló gyermekeimnek (1982)
- A remény joga (1982)
- Another Way / Egymásra nézve (1982)
- Hosszú vágta (1983)
- Házasság szabadnappal (1983)
- Diary for My Children / Napló gyermekeimnek (1984)
- Hány az óra, Vekker úr? (1985)
- Idő van (1985)
- Eszterlánc (1985)
- Gyerekrablás a Palánk utcában (1985)
- Love, Mother / Csók, Anyu (1987)
- Napló szerelmeimnek (1987)
- Hanussen (1988)
- Jesus Christ's Horoscope / Jézus Krisztus horoszkópja (1989)
- Iskolakerülők (1989)
- Az erősebb (1989)
- Napló apámnak, anyámnak (1990)
- Meeting Venus (1991)
- Sweet Emma, Dear Böbe / Édes Emma, drága Böbe (1992)
- Kék Duna keringő (1992)
- Roncsfilm (1992)
- Zsötem (1992)
- Váratlan halál (1996)
- Házikoszt (1997)
- Passion / Szenvedély (1998)
- A szalmabábuk lázadása (1999)
- Tíz perc: cselló (2002)
- A Rózsa énekei (2002)
- Rózsadomb (2003)
- Bolondok éneke (2003)
- Magyar vándor (2004)
- Lopott képek (2006)
- Szabadság, szerelem (2006)
- Overnight (2007)
- Töredék (2007)
- Pánik (2008)
- Para (2008)
- MAB (2010)
- Csonka délibáb (2015)

=== TV films ===
- Rózsa Sándor (1971)
- III. Richárd (1973)
- III. Béla (1974)
- Itt járt Mátyás király... (1974)
- Megtörtént bűnügyek (1974)
- Asszony a viharban (1975)
- Micsoda idők voltak (1975)
- Volpone (1975)
- Egy csók és más semmi (1975)
- Szépség Háza (1975)
- Attila (1977)
- A bosszú (1977)
- Viszontlátásra, drága! (1978)
- Zokogó majom 1-5. (1978)
- Mire a levelek lehullanak... (1978)
- Egy ház a körúton (1979)
- Képviselő úr (1979)
- Rettegés és ínség a harmadik birodalomban (1980)
- Faustus doktor boldogságos pokoljárása (1982)
- Egymilliárd évvel a világvége előtt (1983)
- Hungarian Dracula (1983) .... Rózsika
- Lélekvándorlás (1983)
- Szerelmes sznobok (1983)
- A hirdetés (1984)
- Kémeri 1-5. (1985)
- Átok és szerelem (1985)
- Puskin utolsó napjai (1986)
- Az állam én vagyok (1986)
- Az ördögmagiszter (1986)
- Farkasok és bárányok (1987)
- Eszmélet (1988)
- Gyilkosság két tételben (1988)
- A cár őrültje (1989)
- Alapképlet (1989)
- Erdély aranykora 1-2. (1989)
- Glóbusz (1992)
- Családi kör (1994)
- Herczeg Ferenc: A harmadik testőr (1995)
- Ábel Amerikában (1998)
- Na végre, itt a nyár! (2001)
- Tea (2003)
- Mozgókép (2003)
- Hóesés Vízivárosban (2004)
- Kivilágos kivirradtig (2005)
- Szeszélyes (2006)
- Koccanás (2009)
- Átok (2009)
- Keleti pu. (2010)
- Korhatáros szerelem (2017–2018)
- Csak színház és más semmi (2018–2019)
