= Allegro barbaro (Bartók) =

1911 solo piano piece by Béla Bartók

Allegro barbaro, BB 63 (Sz. 49), composed in 1911, is one of Béla Bartók's most famous and frequently performed solo piano pieces. The composition is typical of Bartók's style, utilizing folk elements. The work combines Hungarian and Romanian scales; Hungarian peasant music is based on the pentatonic scale, while Romanian music is largely chromatic. The title is a jab at Bartók's critics who called him a 'barbarian'.

== History of the composition ==
Allegro barbaro was composed in 1911, but the first performance didn't occur until 1921. According to Maurice Hinson, editor, Bartók premiered the piece in February 1913 in Kecskemet, Hungary. Like many of Bartók's compositions, there are several different editions of Allegro barbaro. The piece was performed in private by Bartók many times by memory before he even started to notate the music.

In many early printed versions of the composition, the tempo markings were indicated at a much slower speed. These indications would confuse musicians because the recordings of Bartók performing his own composition was much faster than indicated. Also, many times certain accents and dynamics would be performed by the composer, but would not make it to paper because each performance wasn't the same.

The publications of the composition that took place in 1918 in Vienna has become to standard and final edition. Allegro barbaro is a frequent choice of students to orchestrate, in particular for their college studies.

== Analysis ==
The opening melody of Allegro barbaro is largely pentatonic (the first 22 notes of the melody use a cell that consists only of a whole tone and a minor third, the building block of the pentatonic scale). Indeed, the opening melody uses a Phrygian mode subset. Like many of Bartók's compositions, this piece circles around a tonal pitch. This pitch almost always stays constant and the major, minor, or modal relations around it changes. Allegro barbaro is a short, dance-like composition, that at first sounds like it's free composed. However, one can begin to find traditional structure to the piece by looking at the harmony. Allegro barbaro is in ternary form, which means that there are two distinct themes, but one is presented twice. A typical diagram looks like this: A–B–A. The beginning of the composition centers on F♯, the second thematic area centers on F, and the return of theme 1 is again centered on F♯. Allegro barbaro melodic material is mostly based on the pentatonic scale, while the underlying harmonies are chromatic. Many of the cadence points end in a major or minor fashion, but arrived by chromatic motion.

To keep the edge of freedom and wild force, Bartók frequently breaks the flow of Allegro barbaro in a peremptory way to scare the listener a little with a potential for violence. The irregular-seeming cadences ending the major phrases and sections catch you by surprise or make you wait a bit for each return to the attack. Many analyses of this composition include the overall form and harmonies, but have not been able to find a pattern in how the cadences are formed. The dynamics are jagged and shocking as well through the entire piece. For example, there are accent marks and the sff (which means "subito fortissimo"/“suddenly very loud”) above these lines of the score.

== Discography ==
Allegro barbaro has been recorded on hundreds of albums. Some of the most famous recordings include:

- Out of Doors, performed by pianist Jenő Jandó
- Béla Bartók Piano Works, performed by Andreas Bach
- Béla Bartók Baroque Transcriptions performed by György Sándor

Many students and professionals perform this composition in recitals and the list of recordings is quite long.

Progressive rock band Emerson, Lake & Palmer adapted the piece as "The Barbarian", featured on their debut album.
