= Lajos Balázsovits =

Hungarian actor (1946–2023)

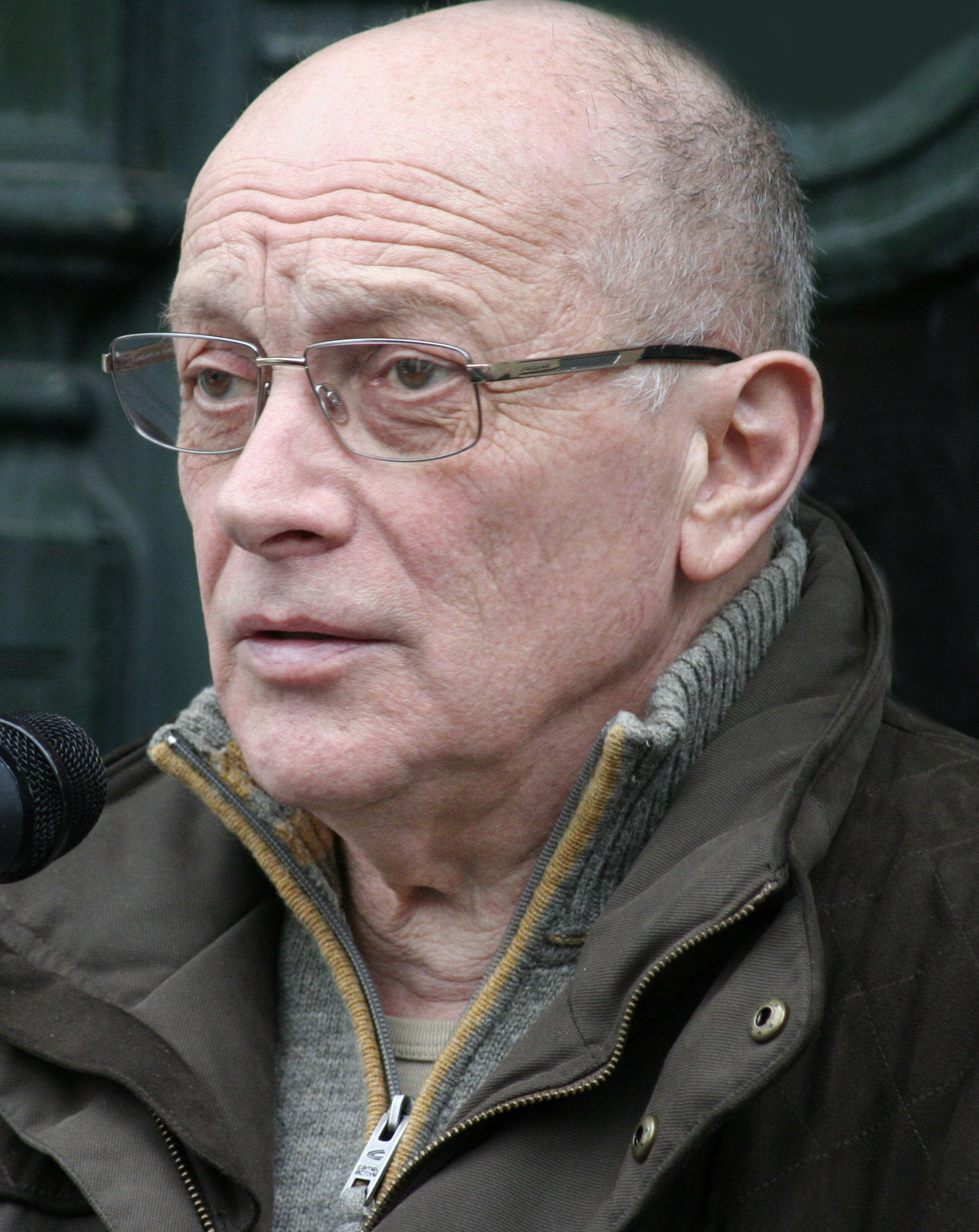
- Balázsovits in 2016
- Born: 4 December 1946; Nagykanizsa, Hungary
- Died: 19 July 2023 (aged 76); Budapest, Hungary
- Occupation: Actor
- Years active: 1968–2006
- Relatives: Edit Balázsovits (daughter)

Lajos Balázsovits (4 December 1946 – 19 July 2023) was a Hungarian film actor. He appeared in 60 films from 1968 to 2006.

== Selected filmography ==
- The Upthrown Stone (1969)
- The Confrontation (1969)
- Milarepa (1974)
- Electra, My Love (1974)
- Private Vices, Public Pleasures (1976)
- A Very Moral Night (1977)
- Hungarian Rhapsody (1979)
- Bizalom (1980)
- Requiem (1982)
- Season of Monsters (1987)
- Mary, Mother of Jesus (1999)
- The Prince and the Pauper (2000)
