= Gyula Hernádi =

Hungarian writer and screenwriter

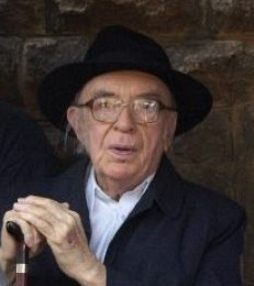
- Born: 23 August 1926; Oroszvár, Hungary (now Rusovce, Slovakia)
- Died: 21 July 2005 (aged 78); Budapest, Hungary
- Occupation: Screenwriter
- Years active: 1965–2005

Gyula Hernádi (23 August 1926 – 21 July 2005) was a Hungarian writer and screenwriter. He wrote for 36 films between 1965 and 2005, mostly for director Miklós Jancsó. He also wrote many novels, mostly surrealistic science fiction or horror stories with unique twists.

== Selected filmography ==
- The Round-Up (1965)
- The Confrontation (1969)
- Red Psalm (1971)
- Electra, My Love (1974)
- The Fortress (1979)
- Season of Monsters (1987)
- Jesus Christ's Horoscope (1989)
