= Tamás Cseh =

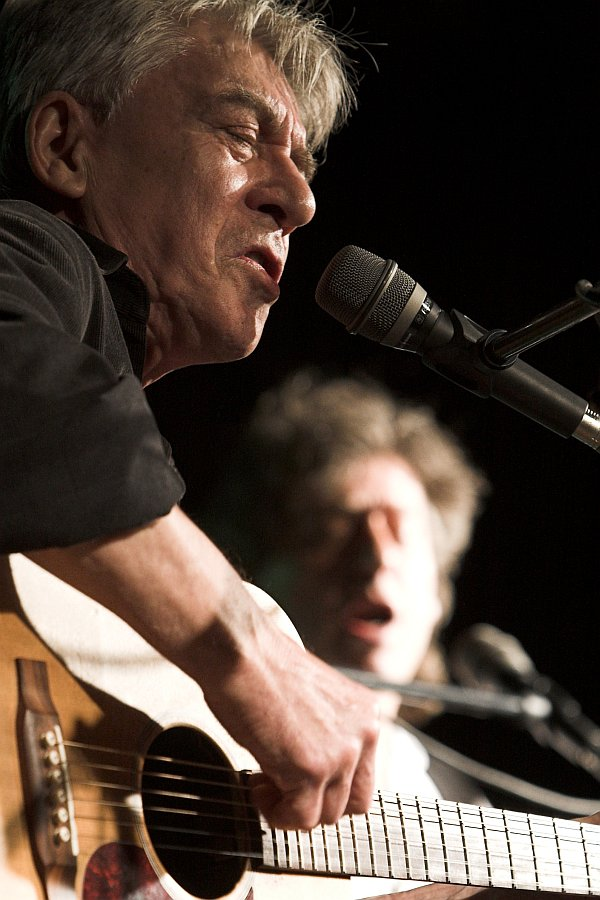
- Born: 22 January 1943; Budapest, Hungary
- Died: 7 August 2009 (aged 66); Budapest, Hungary
- Occupations: composer, singer, actor
- Years active: 1967-2007

Tamás Cseh (22 January 1943 in Budapest – 7 August 2009 in Budapest) was a Hungarian musician, composer, singer and actor. He won the Kossuth Prize and also the Liszt Ferenc prize.

From 1967 to 1974 he taught art at a primary school in Budapest. From 1970 he worked together with Géza Bereményi, composing a vast collection of songs, many of which became popular and are still revered today. A bronze statue was erected after his death, which stands outside Szent Gellert Ter - Muegyetem metro station in Buda.

A 2026 book by Diana Senechal titled More and Less than a Friend: The Songwriting Partnership of Tamas Cseh and Geza Beremenyl in Hungary focuses on Cseh's work with Beremenyl.

== Discography ==
- Levél nővéremnek (1977, with János Másik)
- Antoine és Désiré (1978)
- Fehér babák takarodója (1979)
- Műcsarnok (1981)
- Frontátvonulás (1983)
- Jóslat (1984)
- Utóirat (1987)
- Mélyrepülés (1988)
- Vasárnapi nép (1989, live album)
- Cseh Tamás - Bereményi Géza válogatáslemez (1990)
- Új dalok (1990)
- Nyugati pályaudvar (1993)
- Levél nővéremnek 2. (1994, with János Másik)
- A telihold dalai (1997)
- Jóslat a Metrón (2003, live)
- A véletlen szavai (2004)
- Az igazi levél nővéremnek (2004, with János Másik)
- Esszencia (2007, compilation)
- Ózdi koncert '96 (2008)
- A DAL nélkül... (2009)

== Sources ==
- Tamás Cseh at IMDb
- Tamás Cseh's official webpage
- Tamás Cseh Museum of Sándor Petőfi
- "Elhunyt Cseh Tamás - Index.hu". 8 August 2009.
