= János Kende =

Hungarian cinematographer

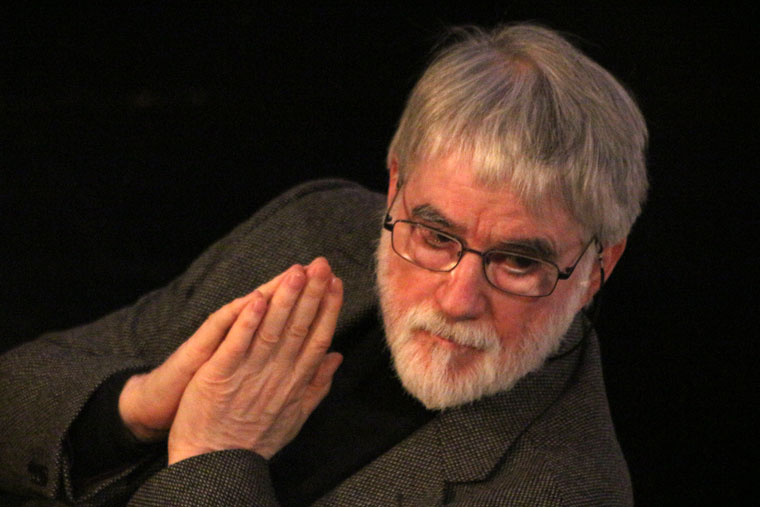
- Born: 22 September 1941 (age 84); Marseille, France
- Occupation: Cinematographer
- Years active: 1967-present

János Kende (born 22 September 1941) is a Hungarian cinematographer. He has worked on more than 60 films since 1967. He was a member of the jury at the 27th Moscow International Film Festival.

== Selected filmography ==
- Red Psalm (1972)
- Voyage with Jacob (1972)
- Petőfi '73 (1973)
- Electra, My Love (1974)
- Hungarian Rhapsody (1979)
- Mathias Sandorf (1979, TV series)
- Forbidden Relations (1983)
- Jesus Christ's Horoscope (1989)
- Jonah Who Lived in the Whale (1993)
- Rua Alguem 5555: My Father (2003)
