= András Kozák =

Hungarian actor

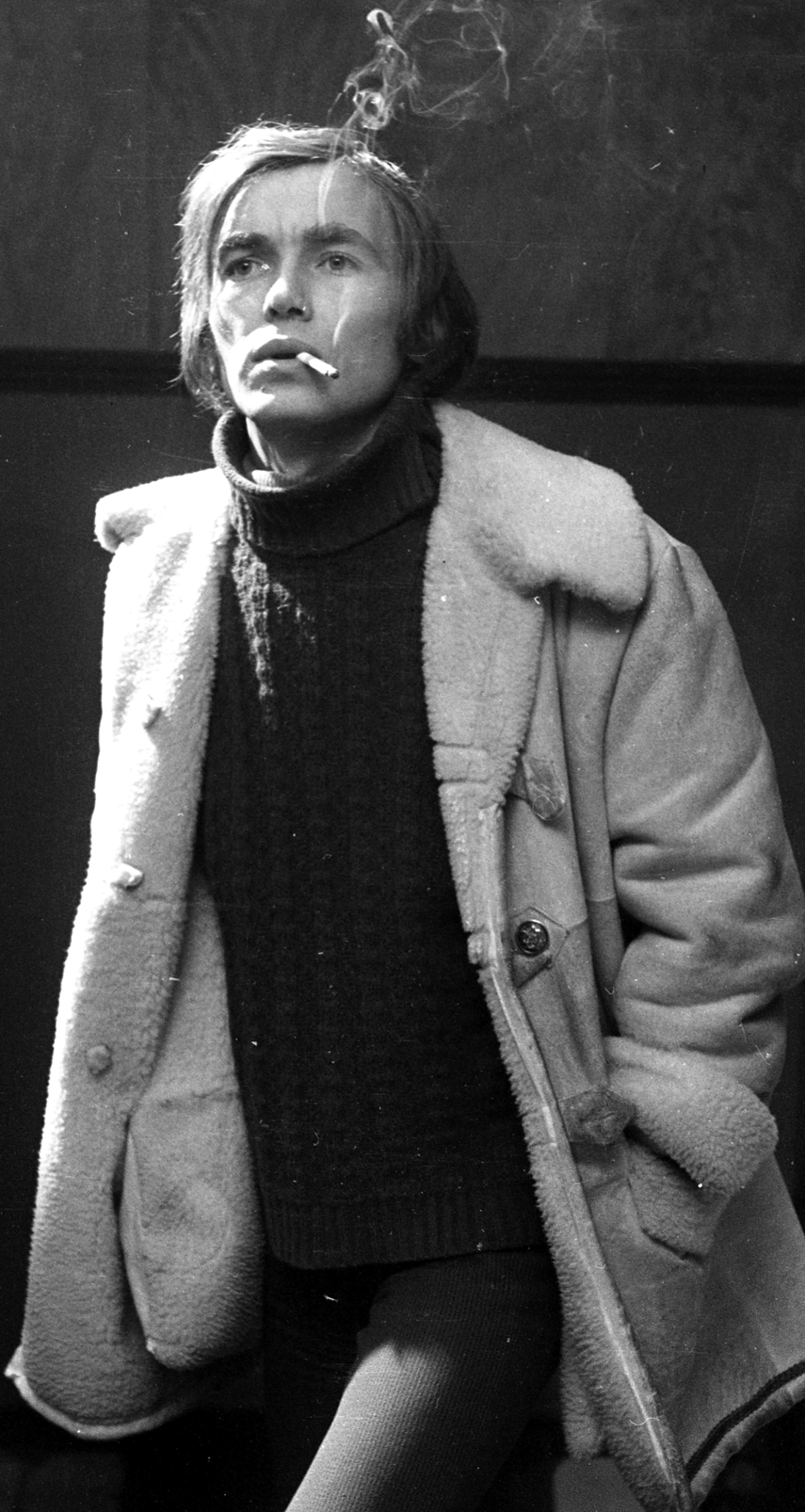
- Kozák in 1970
- Born: 23 February 1943; Gávavencsellő, Hungary
- Died: 24 February 2005 (aged 62); Budapest, Hungary
- Occupation: Actor
- Years active: 1962–2005

András Kozák (23 February 1943 – 24 February 2005) was a Hungarian film actor.

== Selected filmography ==
Film
Year	Title	Role	Notes
1965	The Round-Up	Ifj. Kabai	
1965	My Way Home		
1967	The Red and the White	Laszlo	
1967	Ten Thousand Days	Ifj. Széles István	
1969	The Confrontation	András Kozma	
1975	Mrs. Dery Where Are You?		
1986	The Village Notary	notary Jónás Tengelyi	TV series
1987	Season of Monsters	Colonel Antal	
1989	Jesus Christ's Horoscope	Inspector	
