= József Madaras =

Hungarian actor

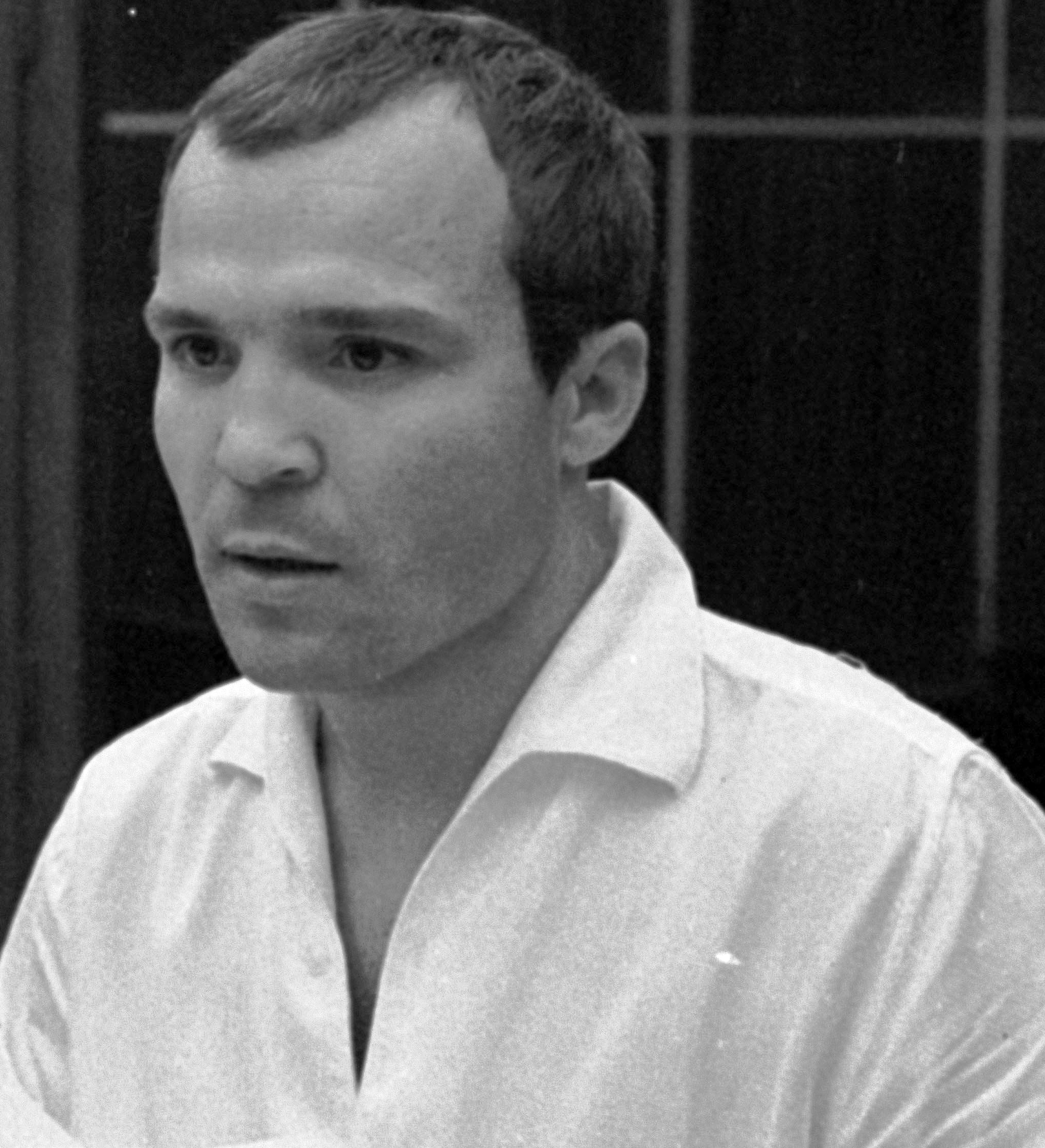
- Born: 16 August 1937; Rigmani, Romania
- Died: 24 April 2007 (aged 69); Máriahalom, Hungary
- Occupation: Actor
- Years active: 1958–2006

József Madaras (16 August 1937 – 24 April 2007) was a Hungarian film actor. He appeared in more than 80 films between 1958 and 2006.

== Selected filmography ==
- The Bells Have Gone to Rome (1959)
- Land of Angels (1962)
- Tales of a Long Journey (1963)
- The Round-Up (1965)
- The Red and the White (1967)
- Silence and Cry (1968)
- The Confrontation (1969)
- Horizon (1971)
- Electra, My Love (1974)
- Budapest Tales (1976)
- Man Without a Name (1976)
- Nobody's Daughter (1976)
- My Father's Happy Years (1977)
- A ménesgazda (1978)
- Hungarian Rhapsody (1979)
- The Fortress (1979)
- Köszönöm, megvagyunk (1981)
- Season of Monsters (1987)
- Howling V: The Rebirth (1989)
- The Summer Guest (1992)
- Relatives (2006)
