= List of films shot in Budapest =

This article lists internationally distributed films that:

- were shot on location in the city of Budapest, capital of Hungary
- use the city of Budapest as a set to portray other cities
- have the story or part of the story set in Budapest, but were not shot there
- if they are animated films, have Budapest as their identifiable venue

Since the 1990s, Budapest has been home to many international film productions. More recently the level of filming has increased, and at peak times up to three or four films will be in shooting. The reasons for this were given by film producer André Szőts in lectures given at the Eötvös Loránd University and in a 2004 television interview on Hungarian television TV2. According to Szőts, Hungary provides for a relatively cheap budget (e.g. salaries are much lower than just about anywhere in the West), and Budapest has kept the image of a city that is so diverse in building types from different eras that it could be substituted for (or disguised to be) any large European city. Szőts has given an example of a French film he produced in which Budapest was a set for 30 different cities.

== Music videos shot in Budapest ==
- Arash: Pure Love
- Clueso: Mitnehm
- David Deejay: So Bizarre
- Mylène Farmer: Désenchantée (1991)
- Groove Coverage: Moonlight Shadow
- Michael Jackson – HIStory teaser, venue: Budapest, Hősök tere (1995)
- Madonna: Don't Cry for Me Argentina (1996) (venue: Andrassy Avenue)
- Roger Sanchez: "You can't change me" (2000)
- Sarah Connor: From Sarah with Love (2001) (venue: Keleti ("Eastern") railway station)
- Jovanotti: Mi fido di te
- Lenny Kravitz: Dancing Till Dawn
- Liberty X: Holding On for You
- maNga: Cevapsız Sorular
- Ziggi Recado: Need to Tell You This
- Ela Rose featuring David Deejay: I Can Feel
- Jolin Tsai: "A Wonder in Madrid"
- Jamie Woon: Lady Luck
- Daniel Docherty: Hold Me
- The Chemical Brothers: "The Boxer" (2005)
- Gwen Stefani: "Early Winter" (2006) (venues: Nyugati ("Western") railway station, inside the waiting room of Queen Elisabeth and Franz Joseph)
- Katy Perry: "Firework" (2010) (venues: Castle Quarter, rooftop at Astoria)
- Selena Gomez & The Scene: "Round & Round" (2010) (venues: Parliament, Hungarian State Opera, Hungarian State Opera House, Danubius Hotel Astoria, Arcades of Dob street, Széchenyi Chain Bridge, Buda Castle, Buda Castle Quarter, Fisherman's Bastion, Danube Promenade, Trams in Budapest, Nyugati Rail Hub area)
- George Ezra: "Budapest" (2013) (lyrics portray Budapest, music video not shot in Budapest)
- Teen Top: "Missing" (2014)
- Davichi: Sorry I'm Happy (2015)
- Deepside Deejays: Never Be Alone
- Avicii: "For a Better Day" (2015)
- Avicii: "Pure Grinding" (2015)
- Ellie Goulding, Diplo, Swae Lee: "Close To Me" (2018) (venues: Fisherman's Bastion, Buda Castle, Castle Garden Bazaar, Gellért Baths) (music video shot in Budapest)
- Will Smith, Nicky Jam, Era Istrefi, Diplo, Ronaldinho: "Live It Up (Official Song 2018 FIFA World Cup Russia)" (2018) (venues: Nagyvásártelep, K-bridge at Hajógyári Island, Óbuda, 1052 Budapest, Károly körút 28.)
- Hwang Min-hyun (Minhyun from NU'EST): Universe (2019)
- Issam Alnajjar: Hadal Ahbek (2020)
- Issam Alnajjar: Mn Gheirik Enti (2021)
- Seventeen (South Korean band): "GOD OF MUSIC" (KO: "(세븐틴) '음악의 신' Official MV") (2023) (Budapest streets and Korda Studios)
- Jungkook (from BTS): "Standing Next to You" (2023) (Kelenföld Power Station, F1 Hungaroring and Origo Studios)
- Jungkook (from BTS), Jack Harlow: "3D" (2023) (Origo Studios)
- Jimin (from BTS): "Who" (2024) (Korda Studios)

== Films and television series shot in Budapest ==
Year	Title	Filming Location(s)	Setting(s)	Details
1939	Two Girls on the Street	Hunnia Film Studio, 13th district of Budapest (location shots)	Budapest	
1964	The Golden Head			
1968	The Fixer			
1972	Bluebeard			
1975	Love and Death		Russia	
1977	The Prince and the Pauper		England	
1981	Escape to Victory		Paris	
1983	Grizzly II: Revenge			released in 2021
1988	Red Heat		Moscow	starring Arnold Schwarzenegger and Jim Belushi
1988	Red Heat		USSR	starring Arnold Schwarzenegger and Jim Belushi
1989	Etoile			
1989	Music Box			
1989	Howling V: The Rebirth			
1990	Cyrano de Bergerac		Paris	
1992	Stalin			
1992	Maigret		Paris	
1993	M. Butterfly		Paris	
1994	My Girl 2			
1995	Citizen X		Moscow	
1995	Citizen X		USSR	
1995	A Kid in King Arthur's Court		Ancient Camelot	
1995	Mortal Kombat			
1996	Evita		Buenos Aires	
1996	Rasputin: Dark Servant of Destiny			
1997	The Hunchback		Paris	
1997	The Cremaster Cycle (Episode 5)			
1998	A Knight in Camelot		Ancient Camelot	
1998	The Phantom of the Opera			
1999	Gloomy Sunday			
1999	Au Pair			
1999	Jakob the Liar		Poland	
1999	Straight from the Heart		Rome	
2000	In the Beginning			
2001	An American Rhapsody			
2001	Spy Game		East Berlin, East Germany	
2001	Last Run			
2002	Dinotopia			
2002	Perlasca – Un eroe Italiano			
2002	I Spy	Buda Castle, Fisherman's Bastion, Matthias Church, Chain Bridge, Hungarian Parliament, Gellért Baths, Hotel Gellért	Budapest	starring Eddie Murphy and Owen Wilson
2002	Valami Amerika aka A Kind of America			Hungarian film
2002–	Való Világ			Real World/Big Brother Hungary
2002	Max		Berlin	
2003	The Lion in Winter			
2003	Kontroll		Budapest	Hungarian film
2003	Underworld	Ferenciek tere, Gozsdu udvar		
2004	Being Julia		London	
2005	8mm 2			
2005	Munich		Rome	portrayed as additional cities
2005	Munich		Paris	portrayed as additional cities
2005	Munich		London	portrayed as additional cities
2006	Day of Wrath		Spain	
2006	Copying Beethoven		Vienna	
2006	Eragon			
2006	Severance			
2007	Painkiller Jane			
2008	100 Feet			
2008	Good			
2008	Hellboy 2: The Golden Army	Korda Studios		
2008	Transporter 3			starring Jason Statham
2008	The Boy in the Striped Pyjamas		Berlin	
2008	Valami Amerika 2, EN: A Kind of America 2			Hungarian film, sequel to: Valami Amerika
2009	Budapest			
2009	Iris			South Korean series (K-Drama)
2010	Iris: The Movie			South Korean film
2010	Pillars of the Earth			
2010	The Nutcracker in 3D		Vienna	
2010	Juan			
2010	La Rafle			
2010	The Debt		East Berlin, East Germany	
2010	Carlos (Carlos the Jackal)			
2010–	X-Faktor			X-Factor Hungary
2011	The Rite			
2011	The Borgias			
2011	Tinker Tailor Soldier Spy			
2011	Season of the Witch			
2011	Bel Ami		Paris	
2011	Die Samenhändlerin			
2011	Silent Witness			
2011	Mission: Impossible – Ghost Protocol	Aerial drone footage of Hungarian Parliament, Danube, St. Stephen's Basilica, Keleti station	Budapest	Opening 00:00-02:15 of film takes place in Budapest
2011	Monte Carlo	Hungarian State Opera, Raleigh Studios Budapest, Dunakeszi, Metropolitan Ervin Szabó Library,	Paris	Many Paris and Monte Carlo scenes were shot in Budapest
2011	Monte Carlo	Hungarian State Opera, Raleigh Studios Budapest, Dunakeszi, Metropolitan Ervin Szabó Library,	Monte Carlo	Many Paris and Monte Carlo scenes were shot in Budapest
2011	The Eagle			
2011	In the Land of Blood and Honey			Angelina Jolie directed
2011	Asterix and Obelix: God Save Britannia		Ancient Britannia	
2012	The Raven			
2013	Dracula			on NBC
2013	A Good Day to Die Hard	Budapest Ferenc Liszt International Airport (as JFK Airport), Heroes' Square, Formula One racing circuit Hungaroring, Old Soviet Air Force Base/ Kiskunlacháza Airport in Kiskunlacháza (as Chernobyl), Raleigh Studios Budapest, Párizsi Udvar/Paris Court	New York-JFK Airport	starring Bruce Willis and Jai Courtney
2013	A Good Day to Die Hard	Budapest Ferenc Liszt International Airport (as JFK Airport), Heroes' Square, Formula One racing circuit Hungaroring, Old Soviet Air Force Base/ Kiskunlacháza Airport in Kiskunlacháza (as Chernobyl), Raleigh Studios Budapest, Párizsi Udvar/Paris Court	Moscow	starring Bruce Willis and Jai Courtney
2013	A Good Day to Die Hard	Budapest Ferenc Liszt International Airport (as JFK Airport), Heroes' Square, Formula One racing circuit Hungaroring, Old Soviet Air Force Base/ Kiskunlacháza Airport in Kiskunlacháza (as Chernobyl), Raleigh Studios Budapest, Párizsi Udvar/Paris Court	Russia	starring Bruce Willis and Jai Courtney
2013	A Good Day to Die Hard	Budapest Ferenc Liszt International Airport (as JFK Airport), Heroes' Square, Formula One racing circuit Hungaroring, Old Soviet Air Force Base/ Kiskunlacháza Airport in Kiskunlacháza (as Chernobyl), Raleigh Studios Budapest, Párizsi Udvar/Paris Court	Chernobyl	starring Bruce Willis and Jai Courtney
2013	World War Z		Moscow	starring Brad Pitt
2013	47 Ronin		18th centuryJapan	starring Keanu Reeves
2013	The Art of the Steal		Warsaw	
2013	Iris II: New Generation			South Korean series (K-Drama)
2013	Iris 2: The Movie			South Korean film
2014	Doctor Stranger			South Korean series (K-Drama)
2014	Hercules			starring Dwayne Johnson
2014	Kenau			
2014–2019	The Last Kingdom			4 seasons shot in Budapest
2014	Underdog			
2014	White God			
2015	Spy	Budapest Airport Terminal 1 as Fiumicino Airport, Lake Balaton (as itself & as Varna), Tihany Abbey, Tihany, Kelenföld, Four Seasons Hotel Gresham Palace, Fót Studios, Danube, Hungarian Parliament, Budapest Whale(hu) (as open air concert in Paris), Chain Bridge, Hungarian State Opera (as Casinò di Roma), Origo Studios	Paris	starring Melissa McCarthy, Jason Statham, Jude Law, Rose Byrne
2015	Spy	Budapest Airport Terminal 1 as Fiumicino Airport, Lake Balaton (as itself & as Varna), Tihany Abbey, Tihany, Kelenföld, Four Seasons Hotel Gresham Palace, Fót Studios, Danube, Hungarian Parliament, Budapest Whale(hu) (as open air concert in Paris), Chain Bridge, Hungarian State Opera (as Casinò di Roma), Origo Studios	Rome	starring Melissa McCarthy, Jason Statham, Jude Law, Rose Byrne
2015	Spy	Budapest Airport Terminal 1 as Fiumicino Airport, Lake Balaton (as itself & as Varna), Tihany Abbey, Tihany, Kelenföld, Four Seasons Hotel Gresham Palace, Fót Studios, Danube, Hungarian Parliament, Budapest Whale(hu) (as open air concert in Paris), Chain Bridge, Hungarian State Opera (as Casinò di Roma), Origo Studios	Fiumicino Airport	starring Melissa McCarthy, Jason Statham, Jude Law, Rose Byrne
2015	Spy	Budapest Airport Terminal 1 as Fiumicino Airport, Lake Balaton (as itself & as Varna), Tihany Abbey, Tihany, Kelenföld, Four Seasons Hotel Gresham Palace, Fót Studios, Danube, Hungarian Parliament, Budapest Whale(hu) (as open air concert in Paris), Chain Bridge, Hungarian State Opera (as Casinò di Roma), Origo Studios	Budapest	starring Melissa McCarthy, Jason Statham, Jude Law, Rose Byrne
2015	Spy	Budapest Airport Terminal 1 as Fiumicino Airport, Lake Balaton (as itself & as Varna), Tihany Abbey, Tihany, Kelenföld, Four Seasons Hotel Gresham Palace, Fót Studios, Danube, Hungarian Parliament, Budapest Whale(hu) (as open air concert in Paris), Chain Bridge, Hungarian State Opera (as Casinò di Roma), Origo Studios	Lake Balaton	starring Melissa McCarthy, Jason Statham, Jude Law, Rose Byrne
2015	The Martian	Budapest Whale(hu) as NASA's Johnson Space Center	Beijing	starring Matt Damon
2015	The Martian	Budapest Whale(hu) as NASA's Johnson Space Center	NASA's Johnson Space Center	starring Matt Damon
2016	Inferno			starring Tom Hanks
2016	Maigret			TV series
2016	Spectral		Moldova	
2016	Don't Breathe	Stern Film Studio, Pomáz, Hungary as interiors of The Blind Man's house; Nagyvásártelep as car scene		primarily shot in Hungary with only a few brief scenes actually filmed in Detroit
2017	The Crown (season 2)		Germany	Netflix original series
2017	Blade Runner 2049			starring Ryan Gosling
2017	Surga Yang Tak Dirindukan 2			
2017	Atomic Blonde		West Berlin	starring Charlize Theron
2017	Atomic Blonde		East Berlin	starring Charlize Theron
2017	Red Sparrow		Budapest	starring Jennifer Lawrence
2017	Red Sparrow		Helsinki	starring Jennifer Lawrence
2017	Red Sparrow		Moscow	starring Jennifer Lawrence
2017	Raabta			
2018	Valami Amerika 3, EN: A Kind of America 3			Hungarian film, sequel to Valami Amerika 1 (2002) and 2 (2008)
2018	Man to Man			
2018	Budapest			Netflix original series
2018	Homeland (season 7)		Moscow	USA Network original
2018	Sunset			
2018	Terminal			
2018	The Spy Who Dumped Me	BUD Airport T1 as Lax Airport interiors; BUD Airport Parking Lot as LAX Airport Parking Lot; Corvin Park (where Audrey and Morgan attempt to steal a vintage car from old couple, Hungarian actors: Ági Bánfalvy and Áron László); Technical University of Budapest's Library (as Bibliothèque Mazarine); KÖKI Terminal Shopping Centre; Józsefváros' A Grund pub (as an LA bar); Csepel (as Amsterdam); Vajdahunyad Castle (as Prague Castle); Terézváros' Eötvös u.; Szatyor Bár, Bartók Béla út 36 (Audrey and Morgan dye their hair there); Kelenföld railway station (as Wien Hauptbahnhof); Budapest Whale(hu) (Nadedja drives off with the Ferrari in Berlin); Szabadság tér (Sebastian and the girls drive out of the underground car park in Paris and also when minutes later they make a U-turn with the car); Premier Outlet Biatorbágy (Audrey walks with Sebastian to the surveillance van in LA)	Budapest	starring Kate McKinnon, Mila Kunis, Hasan Minhaj, Gillian Anderson
2018	The Spy Who Dumped Me		Vienna	starring Kate McKinnon, Mila Kunis, Hasan Minhaj, Gillian Anderson
2018	The Spy Who Dumped Me		Berlin	starring Kate McKinnon, Mila Kunis, Hasan Minhaj, Gillian Anderson
2018	The Spy Who Dumped Me		Paris	starring Kate McKinnon, Mila Kunis, Hasan Minhaj, Gillian Anderson
2018	The Spy Who Dumped Me		Los Angeles	starring Kate McKinnon, Mila Kunis, Hasan Minhaj, Gillian Anderson
2018	The Spy Who Dumped Me		Lax Airport	starring Kate McKinnon, Mila Kunis, Hasan Minhaj, Gillian Anderson
2018	The Spy Who Dumped Me		Lithuania	starring Kate McKinnon, Mila Kunis, Hasan Minhaj, Gillian Anderson
2018	The Spy Who Dumped Me		Prague	starring Kate McKinnon, Mila Kunis, Hasan Minhaj, Gillian Anderson
2018	The Spy Who Dumped Me		Amsterdam	starring Kate McKinnon, Mila Kunis, Hasan Minhaj, Gillian Anderson
2018	Colette			
2018	The Alienist			
2018	Robin Hood			starring Jamie Foxx
2015–2018	Golden Life AKA Aranyélet		Budapest	currently available on HBO Max with English and other subtitles. Original networks: HBO Europe, HBO Go, HBO Hungary
2018	Alarm für Cobra 11 season 24, episode 1: "Most Wanted"	Hungarian Parliament Building, Kossuth Square, Alkotmány utca, Keleti station, Liberty Bridge, Danube Promenade, Ethnographic Museum, Lion's Court (inside Buda Castle), Buda Castle	Budapest	aired: September 13, 2018 (Germany), June 6, 2021 (Hungary); Hungarian title: Cobra 11
2019	The Rookies	Hungarian State Opera House, Liberty Bridge, Gellért Hill, Váci Street, Liberty Square	Budapest	
2019–	The Witcher			Netflix original series
2019	Midsommar			starring Florence Pugh
2019–	Hanna			Amazon Prime Video original series
2019–2020	Treadstone	primary filming and photography in Budapest	Budapest	based in the Jason Bourne movie/book universe US: USA Network original, Internationally: Amazon Prime Video original series
2019–2020	Treadstone	primary filming and photography in Budapest	Berlin	based in the Jason Bourne movie/book universe US: USA Network original, Internationally: Amazon Prime Video original series
2019–2020	Treadstone	primary filming and photography in Budapest	Paris	based in the Jason Bourne movie/book universe US: USA Network original, Internationally: Amazon Prime Video original series
2019–2020	Treadstone	primary filming and photography in Budapest	London	based in the Jason Bourne movie/book universe US: USA Network original, Internationally: Amazon Prime Video original series
2019–2020	Treadstone	primary filming and photography in Budapest	Bucharest	based in the Jason Bourne movie/book universe US: USA Network original, Internationally: Amazon Prime Video original series
2019–2020	Treadstone	primary filming and photography in Budapest	Moscow	based in the Jason Bourne movie/book universe US: USA Network original, Internationally: Amazon Prime Video original series
2019	Gemini Man	Margaret Bridge, Széchenyi Chain Bridge, Hungarian Parliament Building, Heroes' Square and CIty Park, Margaret Island, Danube Promenade, Fisherman's Bastion, Széchenyi thermal bath, Matthias Church, Vajdahunyad Castle, Budapest University of Technology and Economics, Liberty Square, Buda Castle Quarter, Origo Studios 1151 Budapest, Hungary)	Budapest	starring Will Smith
2019	K-12			
2019	Terminator: Dark Fate			starring Linda Hamilton, Arnold Schwarzenegger, Gabriel Luna
2019	6 Underground			Netflix original film, starring Ryan Reynolds
2019	The King	Filmed in Szilvásvárad village in Heves County, Northeastern Hungary		starring Robert Pattinson, Timothée Chalamet
2019	The Song of Names	Budapest, Hungary	London; Poland; New York City	Filmed partly in Hungary; starring Tim Roth and Clive Owen.
2010–2020	Strike Back			seasons 2, 4–6
2020–	Álarcos énekes			Hungarian Masked Singer on RTL Klub
2020	Bloodshot		Budapest	starring Vin Diesel
2020	Radioactive		Paris	Amazon Prime Video original film
2020	Hunters			Amazon Prime Video original series, starring Al Pacino
2020	Pesti Balhé		Budapest	AKA: Budapest Heist
2019, Jan 1– 2020, Dec 23	Drága Örökösök (EN: Dear Heirs)		Budapest	
2021	Outside the Wire			Netflix original film, starring Anthony Mackie Budapest is the sole filming location for the entire film
2021	Marvel's Black Widow		Budapest	cinemas: July 7, 2021, Disney+: July 9, 2021
2021	Marvel's Black Widow		Hungary	cinemas: July 7, 2021, Disney+: July 9, 2021
2021	Marvel's Black Widow		Russia	cinemas: July 7, 2021, Disney+: July 9, 2021
1998, Oct 26 –2021, Jul 17	Barátok közt a.k.a. Among Friends		Budapest	daily series with one of the most episodes in the world: 10,456 episodes total
2021	Dune	Origo Film Studios, Budapest, Felsőkert utca 9, 1151 Hungary (15th District); Budapest; Hungary		Budapest was the setting for some major action set pieces, specifically that of the Arrakeen invasion. Premiered on covid-era formerly-known-as HBO MAX and in cinemas.
2021	MTV Europe Music Awards	László Papp Budapest Sports Arena, Heroes Square and City Park, Andrassy Avenue, Széchenyi thermal bath, Hungary	Budapest	broadcast 14 November 2021, Sunday 8PM local worldwide
2021	MTV Europe Music Awards	László Papp Budapest Sports Arena, Heroes Square and City Park, Andrassy Avenue, Széchenyi thermal bath, Hungary	Hungary	broadcast 14 November 2021, Sunday 8PM local worldwide
2021—2025	FBI: International	Budapest (Fisherman's Bastion area, Chain Bridge area, Film Studios, etc.), Szeged	Budapest	CBS, Paramount+ original series
2021—2025	FBI: International	Budapest (Fisherman's Bastion area, Chain Bridge area, Film Studios, etc.), Szeged	Europe, Morocco, Turkey, Georgia (country)	CBS, Paramount+ original series
2021–	Shadow and Bone			Netflix original series
2021	Escape Room: Tournament of Champions			
2021	The King's Man: The Origins of Kingsman		WWI battlefield scenes at Korda Studios and countryside	
2021	Birds of Paradise			Amazon Prime Video original film
2022	Atlanta S03E05 and Season 3 Trailer	Liberty Bridge, Fisherman's Bastion, Hungarian Parliament Building		starring Donald Glover, FX and Hulu original series airs March 24, 2022 – May 19, 2022
2022	Marvel's Moon Knight	Budapest, Museum of Fine Arts (Budapest), Heroes Square and City Park, Szentendre, Hungary, Origo Studios		Disney+ original miniseries, starring Oscar Isaac, Ethan Hawke, release: March 30, 2022. Marvel Studios started filming March 2021 in Budapest
2022	Jack Ryan season 3	Astra Studios Hungary, Margaret Island		Amazon Prime Video original series, starring John Krasinski
2022	Mrs. Harris Goes to Paris		Paris	
2022	Get Lost (Alice in Wonderland film)	Budapest	Budapest	starring Ella Bleu Travolta
2022	The Unbearable Weight of Massive Talent			starring Nicolas Cage, Pedro Pascal
2022	The Informant (A Besúgó)	Budapest	Budapest	HBO Max Original Series; made by HBO Europe; now streaming on SkyShowtime in select European countries (set your VPN to i.e.: Hungary)
2022-2023	Halo (TV series)	Fővám tér metro station Metro Line M4 (Budapest Metro) as Subway station ín Reach; Millenáris park, Budapest, Hungary as Park on Reach; various locations in Budapest; Dunabogdány quarry, Pest County, Hungary as Madrigal Battlefield -; Dolomite Hills, near Military Memorial, Csákberény, Hungary as Surface of "Halo" in Master Chief's and Makee's visions	Reach, Halo	Paramount+ original series
2023	Poor Things	Budapest, Hungary (incl. Origo Studios)	Victorian-era London	Filmed in Hungary; starring Emma Stone.
2023	Gran Turismo	Budapest, Hungary; Hungaroring	Various international locations	Filmed partly in Hungary; starring David Harbour and Orlando Bloom.
2023	Valami Amerika			Hungarian series, sequel to Valami Amerika 1 (2002), 2 (2008), 3 (2018) RTL+ Hungary, 10-episode mini-series
2023	Dream			South Korean film
2023	Salaar: Part 1 – Ceasefire			Indian film
2023	The Continental: From the World of John Wick	Nyugati Railway Station, Hungarian State Opera House, Andrássy Avenue, Castle District, Kőbánya industrial areas, Origo Studios	New York City, Flat Iron Building (The Continental Hotel, from John Wick)	Peacock, 3 episode mini-series
2023	Marvel's Secret Invasion		Various	Production by Mid Atlantic Films and VR Films Kft.
2024	Slingshot	Budapest, Hungary; Korda Studios	Space / spacecraft	Filmed in Budapest area; starring Casey Affleck and Laurence Fishburne.
2024	My Name Is Loh Kiwan		Brussels	South Korean film
2024	Dune: Part Two	Origo Film Studios, Budapest, Felsőkert utca 9, 1151 Hungary (15th District); Budapest; Hungary		the battle scenes between the Fremen and Harkonnen were filmed in Budapest
2024	Borderlands	The project was filmed at the Stern Film Studio in Budapest, Hungary, a country that was quick to act on COVID-19 protocols, in order to make it safe for cast and crew to work there. -7 Apr 2021		starring Cate Blanchett, Kevin Hart, Jamie Lee Curtis, Jack Black, Olivier Richters; filming started in Budapest in 2021
2024	The Killer's Game	Budapest	Budapest	starring Dave Bautista, Sofia Boutella, Terry Crews, Ben Kingsley; Lionsgate Films
2024	The Day of the Jackal	Budapest	Budapest	November 7, 2024
2024	The Brutalist	Budapest	Budapest	September 1, 2024 (Venice) December 20, 2024 (United States)
2025	Marvel's Captain America: Brave New World		Various	Production by Mid Atlantic Films and VR Films Kft.
2025	Fight or Flight	Budapest, Budapest Airport	Budapest	May 9, 2025
2025	Ballerina: A John Wick Story		early 2024: action sequences filmed in Budapest, particularly featuring Norman Reedus's character. While specific locations have not been publicly disclosed, the city's distinctive architecture and urban landscapes were utilized to enhance the film's aesthetic	John Wick universe spin-off starring Ana de Armas, U.S. release: June 6, 2025. Set between John Wick: Chapter 3 – Parabellum and Chapter 4, focusing on Eve Macarro, a ballerina-assassin trained by the Ruska Roma, who embarks on a quest for vengeance after her father's murder
2025	F1: The Movie	2023 and 2024 Hungarian Grand Prix at Hungaroring	Hungaroring	executive produced by and starring Brad Pitt
2025	NCIS: Tony & Ziva	Budapest	Budapest	Paramount+ Streaming Exclusive
2025	Nuremberg	Budapest		starring Rami Malek, Russell Crowe, Michael Shannon; release: September 7, 2025 (TIFF), November 7, 2025 (United States)
2024	The Terminal List: Dark Wolf	Budapest, Esztergom, Szentendre	Hungary	starring Chris Pratt, Luke Hemsworth; streaming on Amazon Prime Video
2025	Now You See Me: Now You Don't	Budapest (Hungary); Antwerp (Belgium); Abu Dhabi (UAE)	New York City; Antwerp; Abu Dhabi	Heist thriller (Now You See Me series); directed by Ruben Fleischer; starring Jesse Eisenberg, Woody Harrelson, Isla Fisher, Dave Franco, Morgan Freeman; also starring Rosamund Pike, Ariana Greenblatt, Justice Smith, Dominic Sessa.
2026	Ponies	Budapest	Moscow, Soviet Union (1977)	Spy thriller television series (Peacock); premiered 15 January 2026; starring Emilia Clarke, Haley Lu Richardson, Adrian Lester; featuring Pál Mácsai. Filmed in Budapest (Feb–Jul 2025).
2026	Matchbox	Budapest		filming; starring John Cena
TBA	Mayday	Budapest		starring Ryan Reynolds; Apple Original Films
TBA	Dust Bunny	Budapest	Budapest	filming; starring Mads Mikkelsen
TBA	Vienna Game	Budapest	Vienna	filming
TBA	Dune: Part Three	Budapest (Origo Film Studios)	Arrakis	Science fiction film directed by Denis Villeneuve; principal photography began 8 July 2025 at Origo Film Studios in Budapest; starring Timothée Chalamet, Zendaya, Florence Pugh.
TBA	Alone at Dawn	Budapest; Maryland (United States)	Afghanistan (2002)	War drama directed by Ron Howard; starring Adam Driver, Anne Hathaway; principal photography began 10 November 2025 and shoots between Maryland and Budapest.
TBA	The Entertainment System Is Down	Budapest	On board a commercial airliner	Satirical black comedy directed by Ruben Östlund; starring Keanu Reeves, Kirsten Dunst, Daniel Brühl; filming began in Budapest in early 2025.
TBA	The Masque of the Red Death	Budapest		Gothic horror film; scheduled to begin filming in Budapest February 2026; starring Mikey Madison and Léa Seydoux.

== Films set in Budapest ==
The following films or television series episodes had a plot or part of a plot set in Budapest, but were not shot on location.

- Ladies in Love (1936) - with Tyrone Power (billed as Tyrone Power Jr.), Janet Gaynor, Loretta Young, Constance Bennett and Don Ameche. Three women rent a luxury apartment in Budapest while in search of wealthy husbands.
- The Shop Around the Corner (1940) - with James Stewart, Margaret Sullavan and Frank Morgan. Two employees of a Budapest shop clash with each other, neither knowing that the other is the unmet lover they have been corresponding with.
- MacGyver Season 1 Episode 3, "The Thief of Budapest" (1985) - In this episode Budapest looks like a mixture of a city in Turkey and one in Italy. Also, Budapest is set to be a five-minute drive away from the Austrian border, when in reality it is about 200 kilometres away.
- Van Helsing (2004) - Important pieces of plot take place in the Budapest of the 1890s, which was only shown as a background image which merged artist's concepts with a contemporary tourist photograph of the city.
- Burn Notice (2007–2013): multiple episodes including season 1, episode 11 "Dead Drop" (2007) - numerous mentions of Budapest, used as part of the plot.
- Marvel's The Avengers (2012): Scarlett Johansson (Natasha Romanoff aka Black Widow) and Jeremy Renner (Clint Barton aka Hawkeye) mention Budapest numerous times, used as part of the plot.
- Marvel's Avengers: Endgame (2019): Scarlett Johansson (Natasha Romanoff aka Black Widow) and Jeremy Renner (Clint Barton aka Hawkeye) mention Budapest numerous times, used as part of the plot.
- MTV Europe Music Awards (2020): Budapest and London were both the virtual host cities for the EMAs 2020.
- Marvel's Thunderbolts* (2025): multiple characters mention Budapest by name and events that happened in previous movies on-screen such as in the Black Widow movie (2021) and in all Black Widows' comic storyline, such as portrayed on-screen by Scarlett Johansson and Florence Pugh and also Hawkeye's storylines, comics and on-screen in MCU.

== Animated films featuring Budapest ==
- Willy the Sparrow (1989)
- The District! (2004)
- Hotel Transylvania movie franchise (2012–2021)

== See also ==
- Category:Films shot in Hungary
- Category:Television shows shot in Hungary

== Sources ==
- "Budapest Hungary". Filming Location. IMDb.
