= Liberty Bridge (Budapest) =

Bridge over the Danube in Budapest

Liberty Bridge Szabadság híd
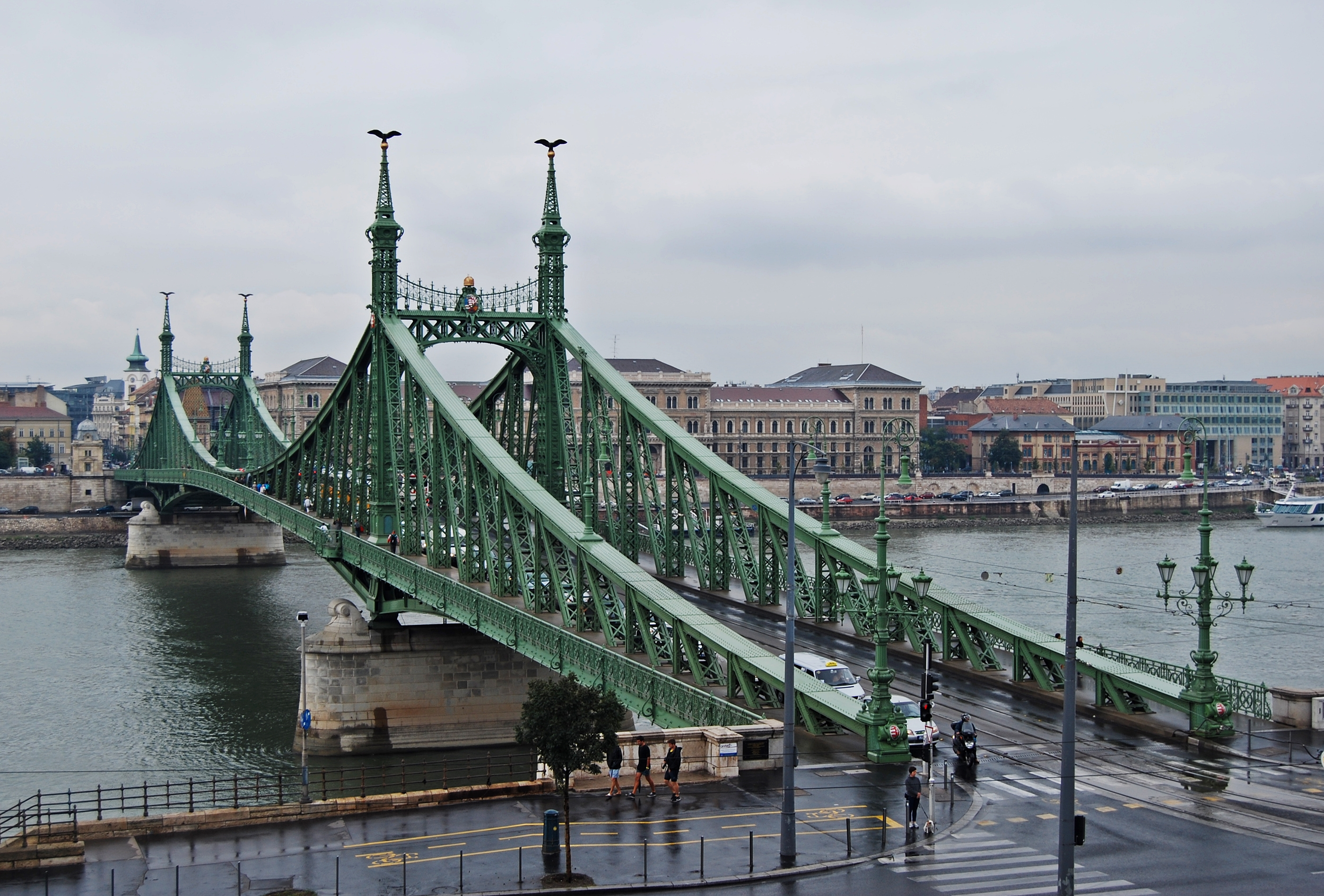
- Coordinates: 47°29′08″N 19°03′18″E
- Crosses: Danube
- Locale: Budapest

Characteristics
- Total length: 333.6 m (1,094 ft)
- Width: 20.1 m (66 ft)
- Piers in water: 2

History
- Architect: János Feketeházy
- Construction start: 1894
- Construction end: 1896
- Rebuilt: 1945

Location
- Interactive map of Liberty Bridge

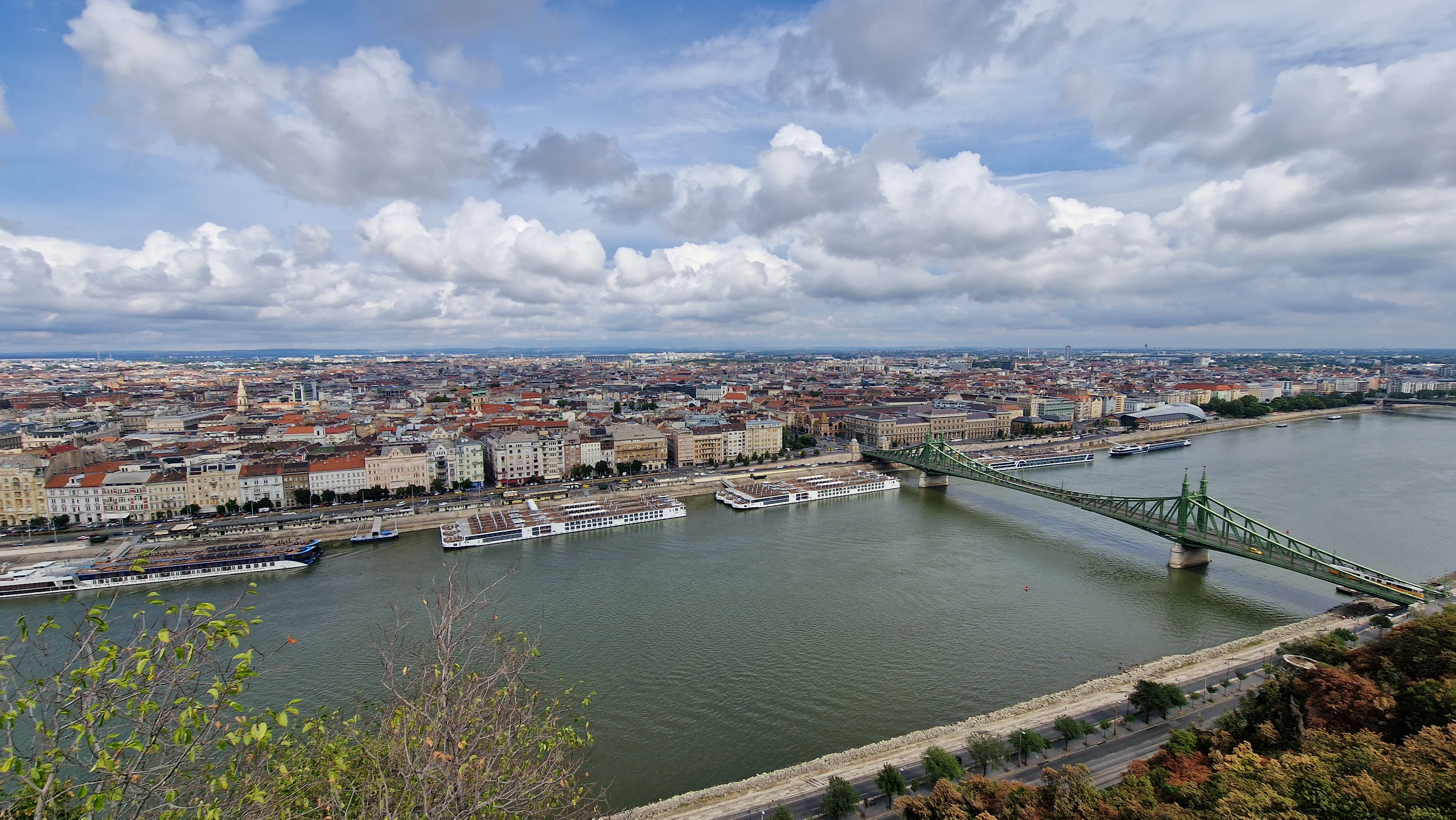
The bridge from a far

The Liberty Bridge or Freedom Bridge (Hungarian: Szabadság híd [ˈsɒbɒtʃaːɡ ˈhiːd]) in Budapest, Hungary, connects Buda and Pest across the Danube river. It is the third southernmost public road bridge in Budapest, located at the southern end of the City Centre. It was originally named Ferenc József híd (Franz Joseph Bridge).

At its two ends are two public squares, Gellért tér (at the foot of Gellért Hill, with the Gellért Spa and Hotel Gellért) and Fővám tér (with the Great Market Hall).

The Liberty Bridge is the shortest bridge in Budapest's center. Initially built as part of the Millennium World Exhibition at the end of the 19th century, the bridge features Art Nouveau design, mythological sculptures and the country's coat of arms adorned on its side.

The northeastern house contains a museum on the bridges of Budapest. The bridge was the first in the city to be rebuilt after suffering heavy damage during World War II.

== Construction ==
The bridge was built between 1894 and 1896 to the plans of János Feketeházy. Although radically different in structure (it is a cantilever truss bridge with a suspended middle span), the bridge imitates the general outline of a chain-type bridge, which was considered an aesthetically preferable form at the time of construction. The bridge was opened in the presence of Emperor Franz Joseph; the last silver rivet on the Pest abutment was inserted into the iron structure by the Emperor himself, and the bridge was originally named after him.

== Dimensions and decorations ==
The bridge is 333.6 m in length and 20.1 m in width. The top of the four masts are decorated with large bronze statues of the Turul, a falcon-like bird, prominent in ancient Hungarian mythology.

== Traffic ==
A number of trams cross the bridge as well as other road vehicles, but there is an initiative to convert it to a pedestrian-only crossing now that the fourth underground metro line is completed.

== See also ==
- Bridges of Budapest
- List of crossings of the Danube River
