= Hotel Gellért =

Art Nouveau hotel in Budapest, Hungary

Coordinates: 47°29′1.63″N 19°3′8.37″E

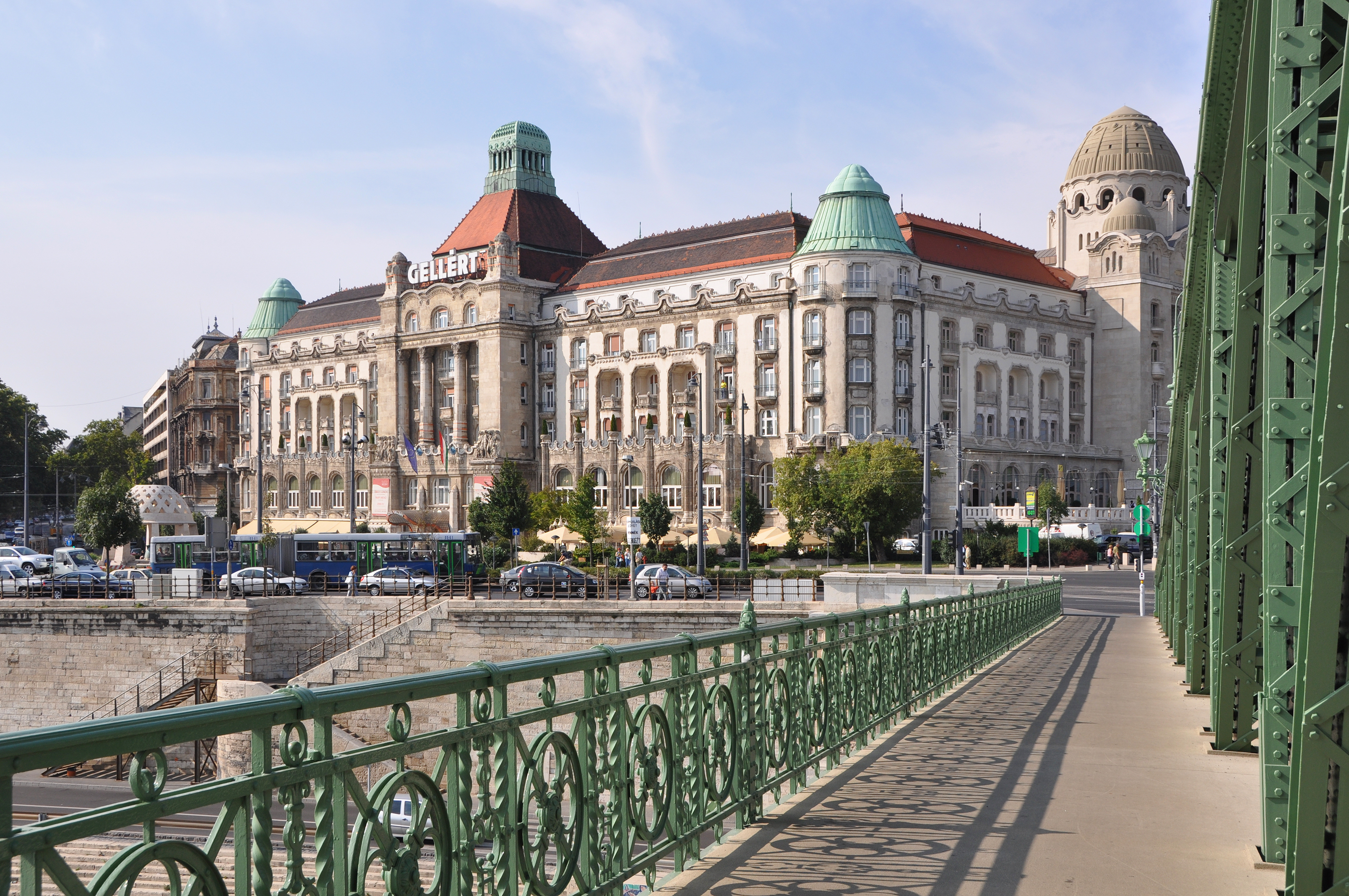
- Hotel Gellért
- Interactive map of the Hotel Gellért area

General information
- Location: Budapest, Hungary, Szent Gellért tér 2
- Opening: 26 September 1918
- Owner: BDPST Group

Design and construction
- Architects: Ármin Hegedűs, Artúr Sebestyén and Izidor Sterk

Other information
- Number of rooms: 143

The Hotel Gellért is a historic Art Nouveau hotel established in 1918 and located on the west bank of the Danube in Budapest, Hungary.

The hotel closed for renovations on December 1, 2021, and is scheduled to reopen in 2027 as Mandarin Oriental Gellert, Budapest.

== History ==
Construction on the Hotel Saint Gellért started in April 1911. The hotel was named for Saint Gellért (St. Gerard Sagredo), the first bishop of Hungary in the 11th Century. The 176-room hotel was designed by Hungarian architects Ármin Hegedűs, Artúr Sebestyén and Izidor Sterk. Work on the hotel slowed due to World War I, and it did not open until 26 September 1918, just as the war was ending and the Austro-Hungarian Empire was descending into chaos.

The hotel was commandeered for military use throughout 1919, during the Aster Revolution, the Hungarian Soviet Republic and the Romanian occupation of Budapest. When Admiral Miklós Horthy led the forces of the Hungarian National Army into the city, on 16 November 1919, he made the hotel his headquarters, and gave a speech to the huge crowd gathered outside.

Once Hungary was established as an independent country, the hotel proved so financially successful that it was expanded in 1927 with 60 more guest rooms and an outdoor artificial wave pool built on the site of the hotel's gardens. Noted Hungarian restaurateur Károly Gundel took over management of the hotel's restaurants in 1927 as well. In 1934, the "thermal bath" was added, in place of the hotel's glass-domed Winter Garden.

The hotel remained open throughout most of World War II, until it closed on 26 December 1944, as the Siege of Budapest began. It was bombed out and largely destroyed in January 1945. The wave pool reopened in summer 1945. Post-war Communist authorities removed the "St." from the hotel's name and it became the Hotel Gellért. The Gellért Hill wing of the hotel reopened on 26 March 1946, with 50 rooms, using the baths entrance on Kelenhegyi Street. The hotel's first guests were Danish relief workers bringing food aid. The hotel's Marble Room restaurant reopened on 20 August 1946, just after the new currency, the forint, had been introduced, to stabilize the Hungarian economy.

The restaurants leased by the Gundel family were nationalized in 1948, after which the entire establishment was state-owned and operated. The main Danube River wing of the hotel was rebuilt starting in 1956 and was officially reopened in 1960. While the facade was restored to its pre-war appearance, the hotel's interiors were rebuilt in a modern style. In 1972, the Gellért Hill wing, which had not been part of the 1956-1960 renovations, was completely reconstructed.

Danubius Hotels assumed management of the hotel in 1981. After the company was privatized in 1992, it purchased the hotel outright in June 1996 and it became the Danubius Hotel Gellért.

On June 24, 2019, Danubius sold the hotel to Indotek, an investment group headed by Hungarian billionaire Dániel Jellinek. Indotek announced plans to renovate and restore the Gellért and reposition it as a five-star luxury hotel, under the management of an international chain. The hotel closed for renovations on December 1, 2021, and ceased to be operated by Danubius Hotels at that point. Indotek sold the shuttered hotel in December 2022 to BDPST Group, owned by István Tiborcz, son-in-law of Hungarian Prime Minister Viktor Orbán.

On December 22, 2023, BDPST Group announced that the hotel will be operated by the Mandarin Oriental Hotel Group as the Mandarin Oriental Gellert, Budapest when it reopens in 2027. Architectural work is being overseen by Budapest-based Archikon Architects, while interior work will be done by London-based Alexander Waterworth Interiors Ltd. The historic Main Lobby, Danube Room, Music Room and Tapestry Room will be restored to their original state, based on historic photographs and plans. The remainder of the building will house 143 rooms, including 38 suites.

== Gellért Baths ==
The Hotel Gellért is connected to the famous Gellért Thermal Bath.

Although the hotel and baths were built together, the baths are today independently owned and operated by the City of Budapest and remained in operation for some time after the hotel's closure.

The baths closed on October 1, 2025 for their own restoration, and are scheduled to reopen in 2028.

== Design ==
The hotel was built in the Secessionist style with some biomorphic elements. The cone-shaped towers that frame the hotel make it distinctive from long distances. The interiors of the hotel were designed in the Art Nouveau style, featuring a high glass cupola and wrought-iron decoration. The ornamentation of the stairs leading from the hotel reception includes a bespoke glass window representing the Chase of the Miraculous Deer from ancient Hungarian mythology. In the spa, the original Art Nouveau ornamentation includes artistic mosaics, colourful windows, and statues.

During and after World War II, the hotel and the thermal baths suffered extensive damage. By the end of the 1950s, reconstruction and renovation work on the hotel and its spa had begun.

== Location ==
From Budapest Ferenc Liszt International Airport the hotel is 21 km away and can be reached by taxi, minibus, or public transport. The principal streets of the city center and the Great Market Hall are just a short ride by public transport or a ten-minute walk across the Liberty Bridge.

The closest train station, Budapest-Kelenföld railway station is just 3 km away and is accessible directly by Line 4 of the Budapest Metro as well as trams and buses that stop in front of the hotel. Budapest Keleti railway station is also easily reached using the Line 4 metro.

Gellért Hill is next to the hotel and the Cave Church and Citadella are reachable on foot for those that can manage going up somewhat steep paths.

== Media appearances ==
- Since it began in 1997, the Balint Balassi Memorial Sword Award international literature prize ceremony has been hosted annually at the hotel.
- The hotel is among the settings of the Video game series Hitman in Hitman: Codename 47 and Hitman: Contracts, under the name Hotel Gallàrd (and known as Hotel Galar in Hitman: Contracts), although it is more often referred within the game as the "Thermal Bath Hotel".
- A music video for the song "You Can Get It" by German Eurodance act Maxx was mostly filmed inside the Gellért Spa in 1994.
- The hotel has appeared in the following films:
  - The Golden Head (1963)
  - A hamis Izabella (1969)
  - A Kantor (1970)
  - Kojak in Budapest (1980)
  - Csontvary (1980)
  - Mephisto (1981)
  - Io e Mia sorella (1988)
  - The Edge of Sanity (1988)
  - The Star (1988)
  - Eroltetet menet (1988)
  - Music Box (1989)
  - Evita (1996)
  - Der Brockerer (2000)
  - I Spy (2001)
  - The Moon and the Stars (2006)
  - Le Tournoi (2015)
  - Natale a 5 stelle (2018)
  - Red Sparrow (2018)

== Gallery ==
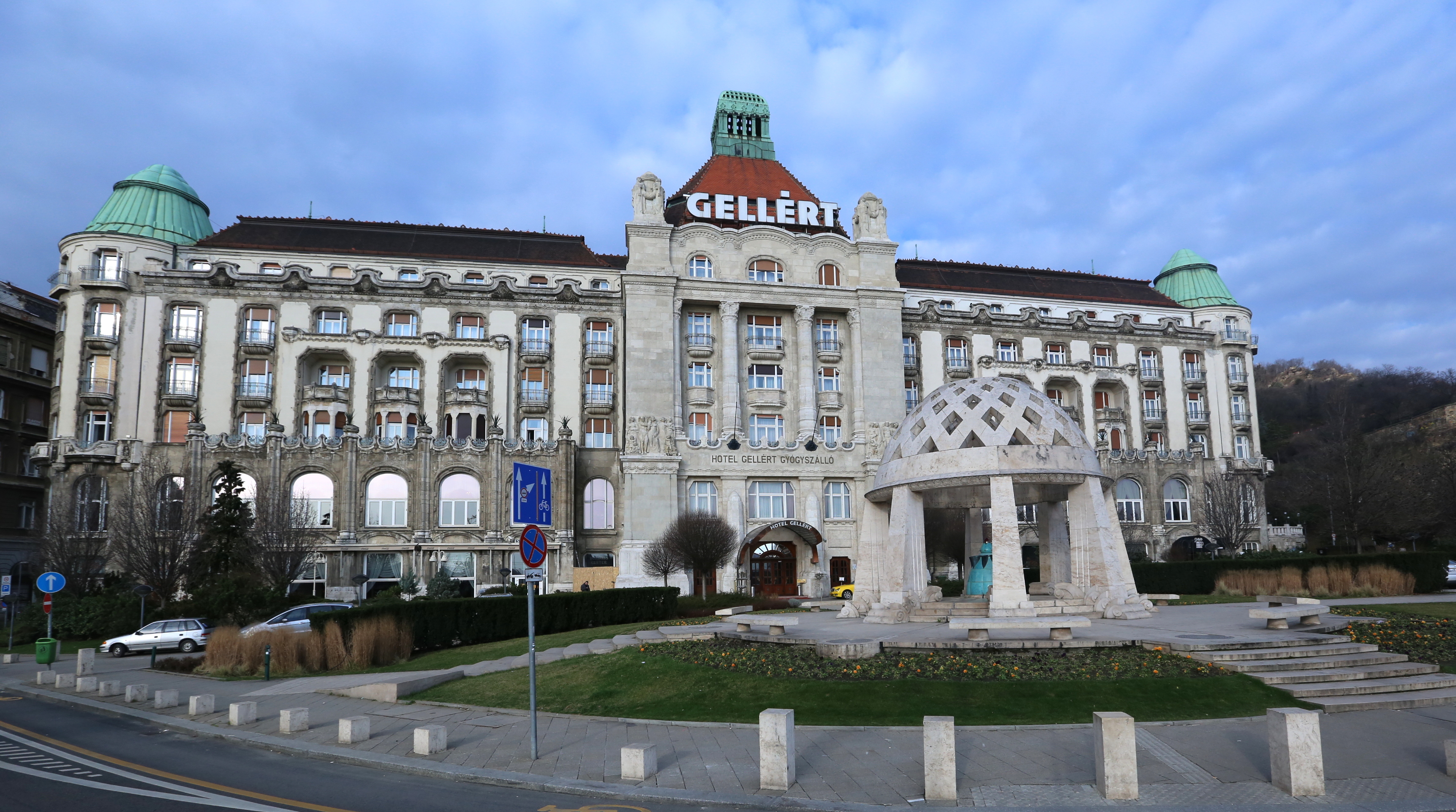

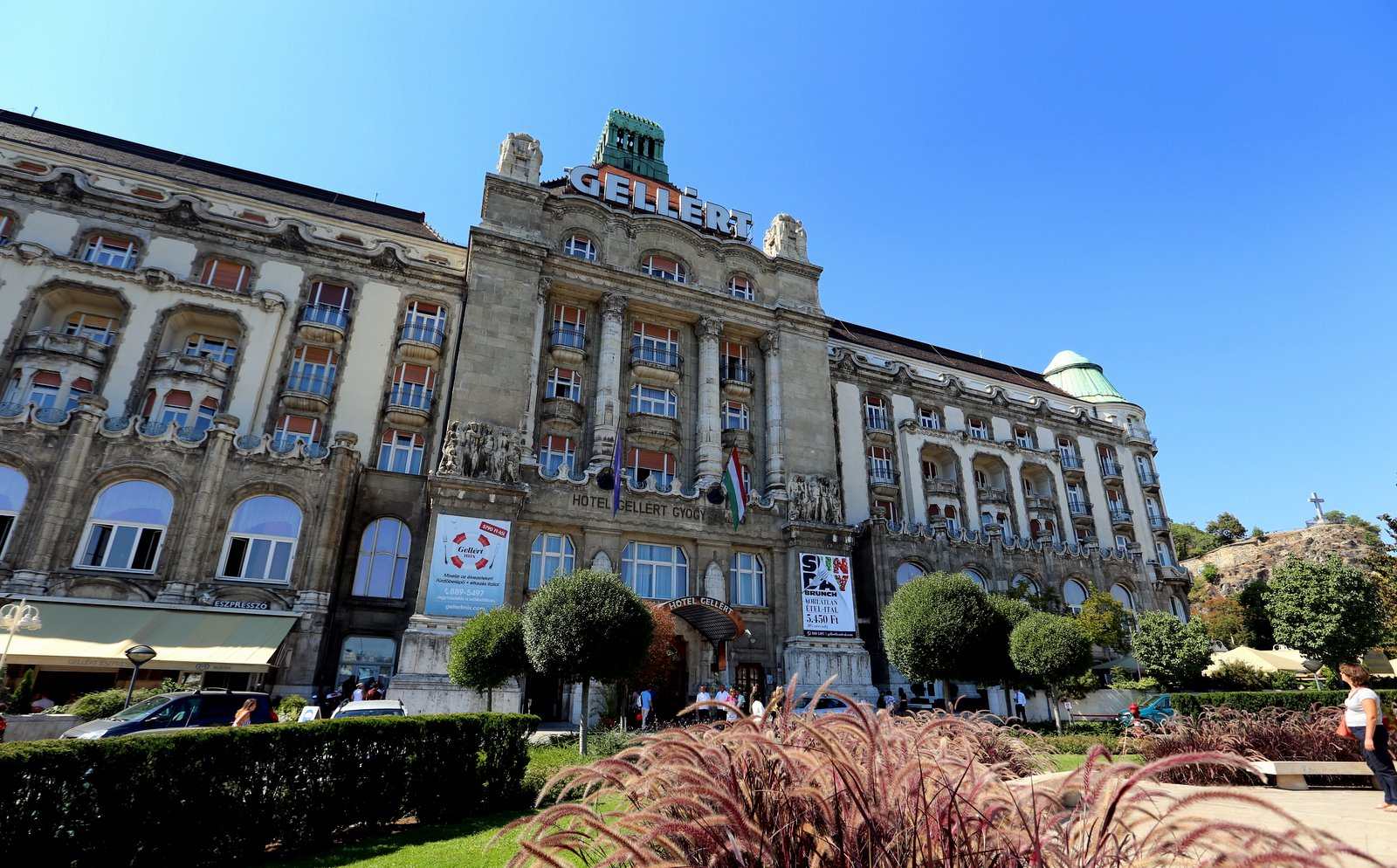

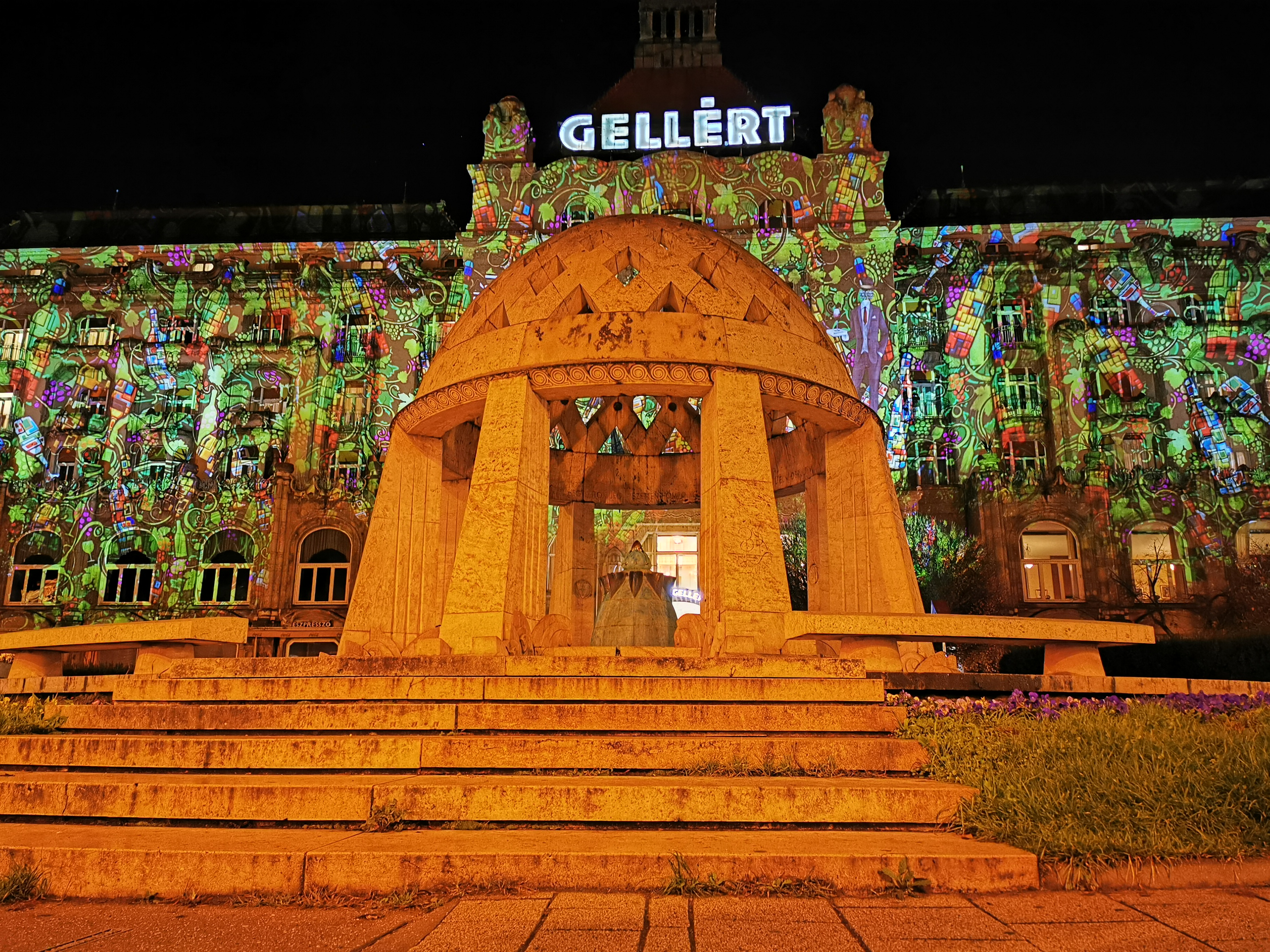

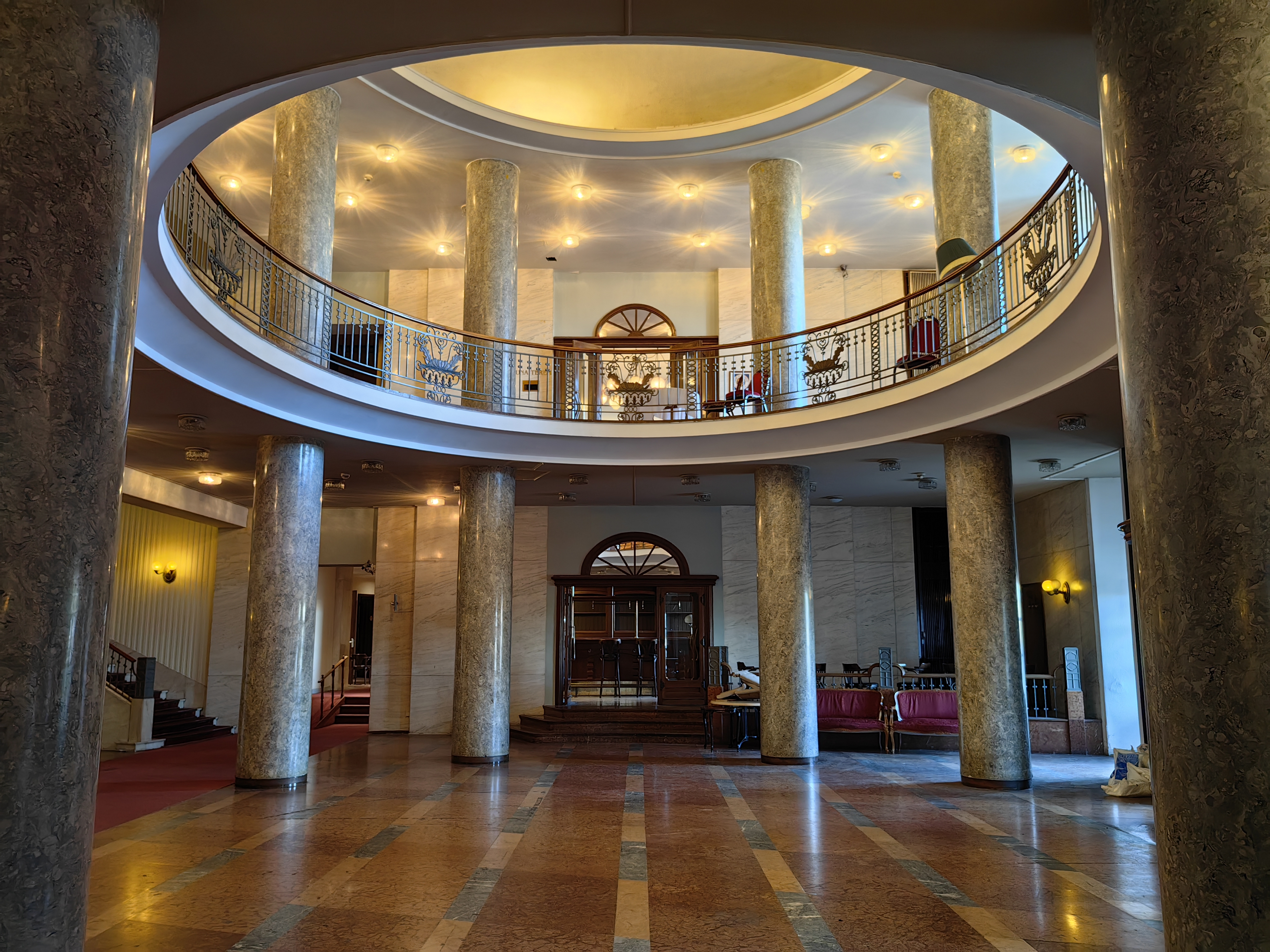

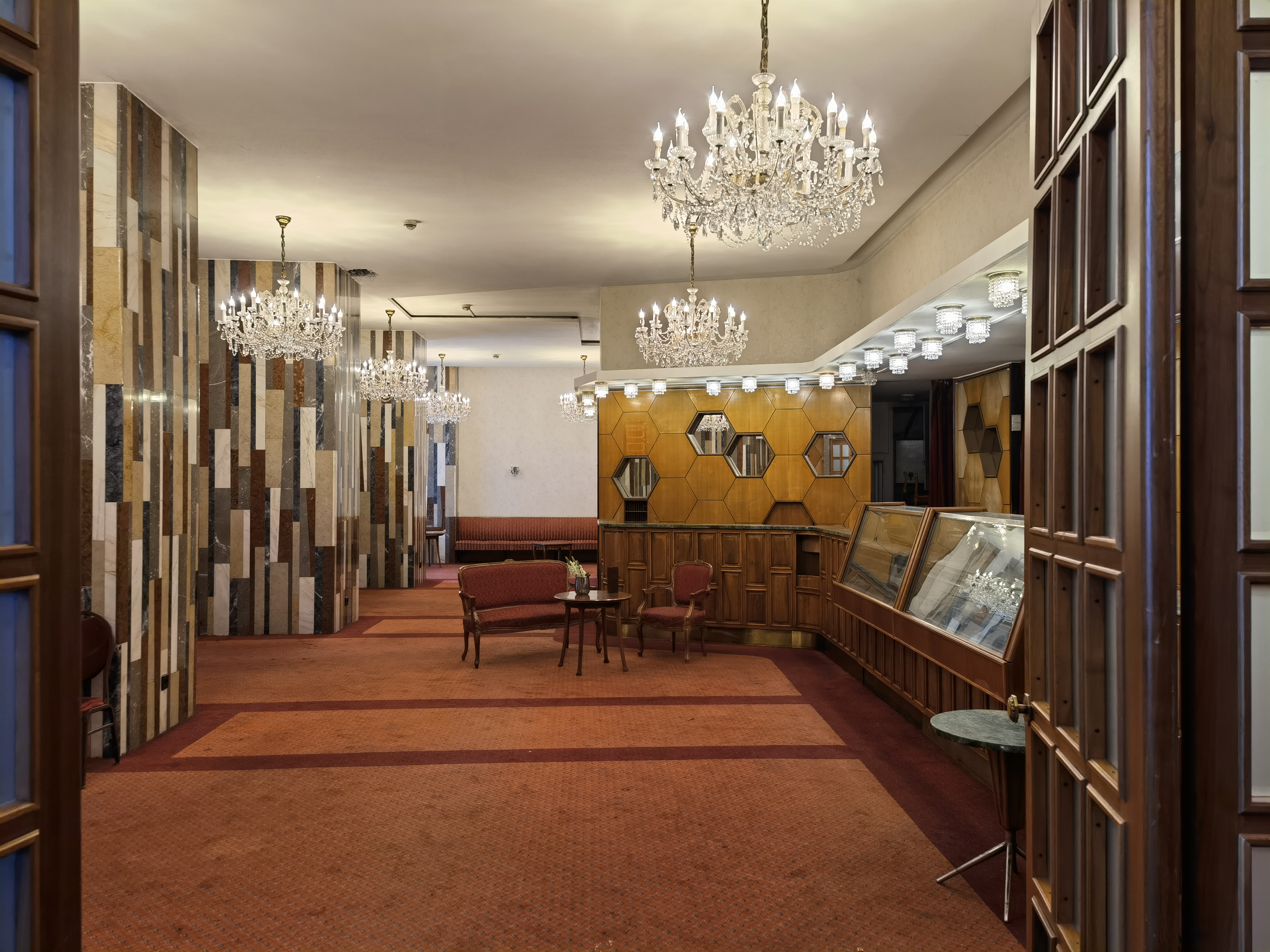

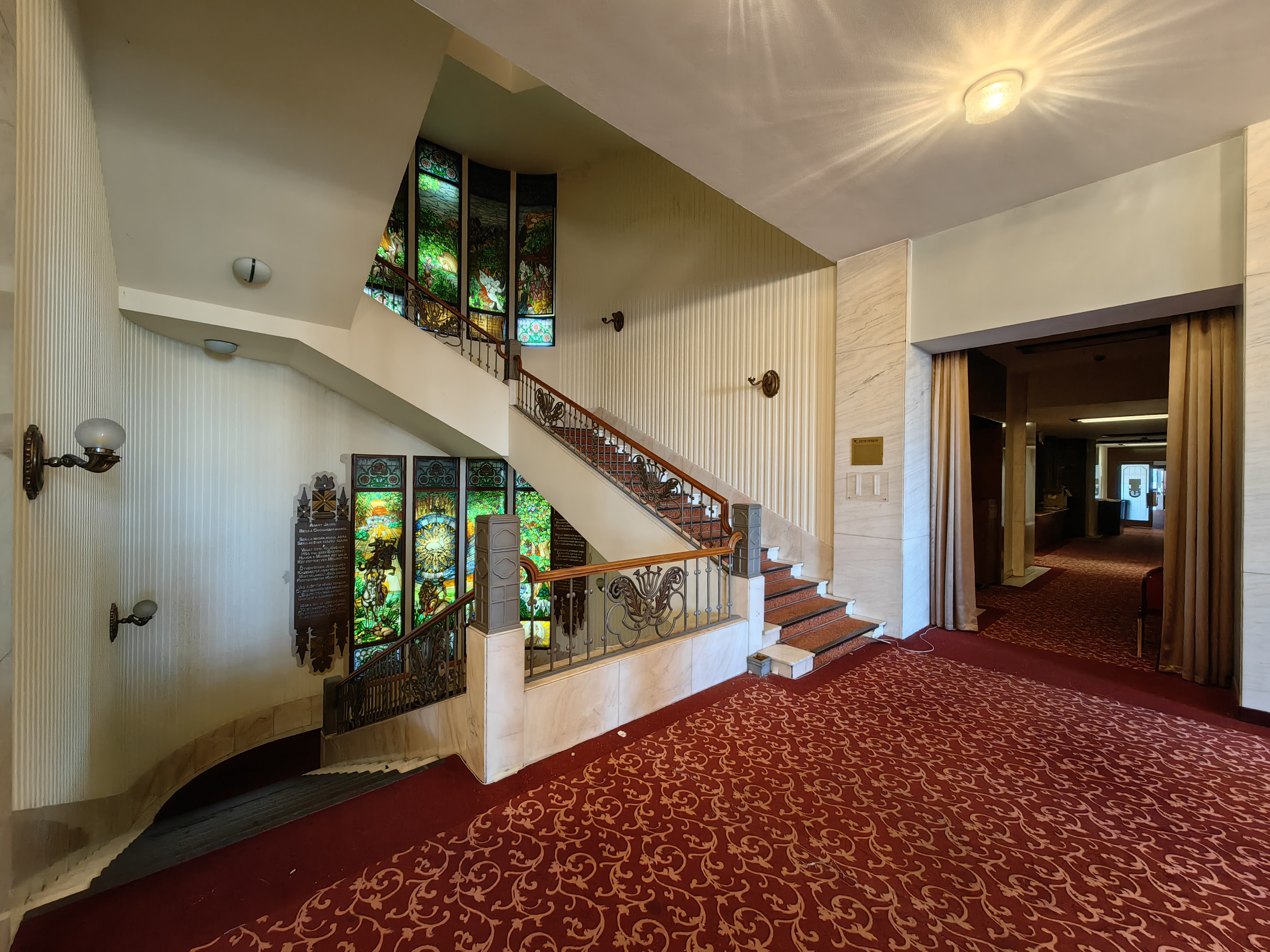

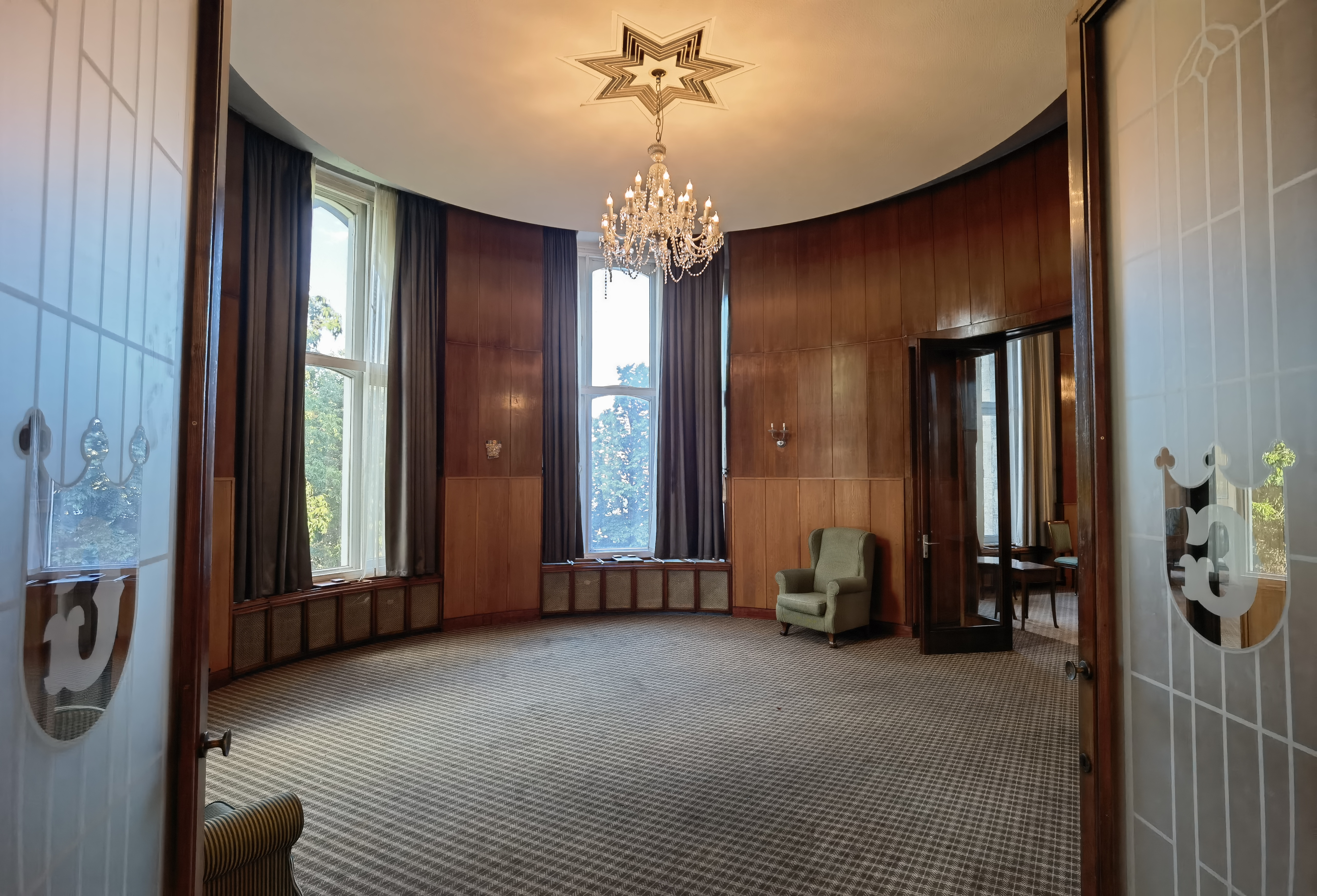

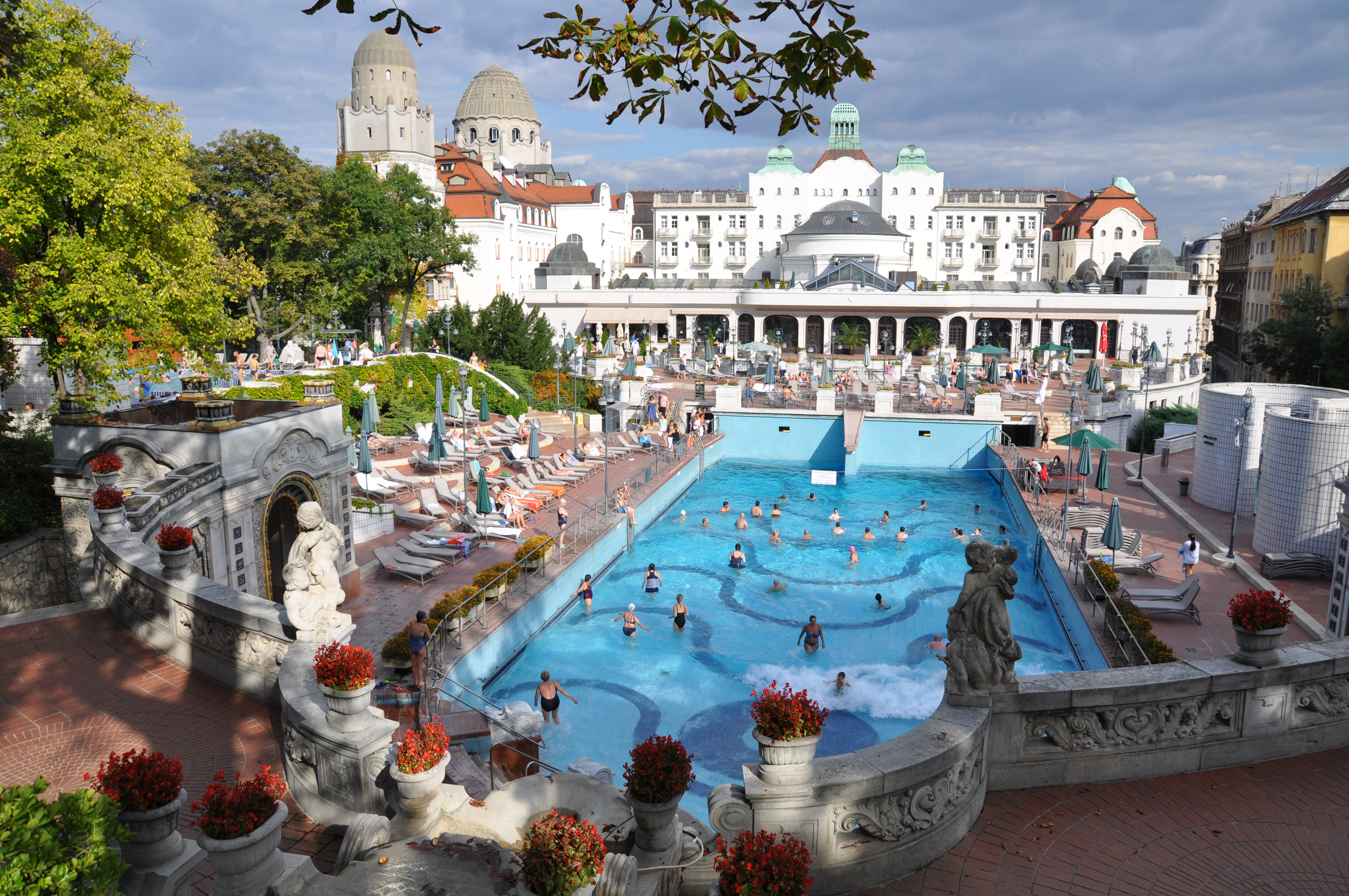
The outdoor wave pool, added in 1927

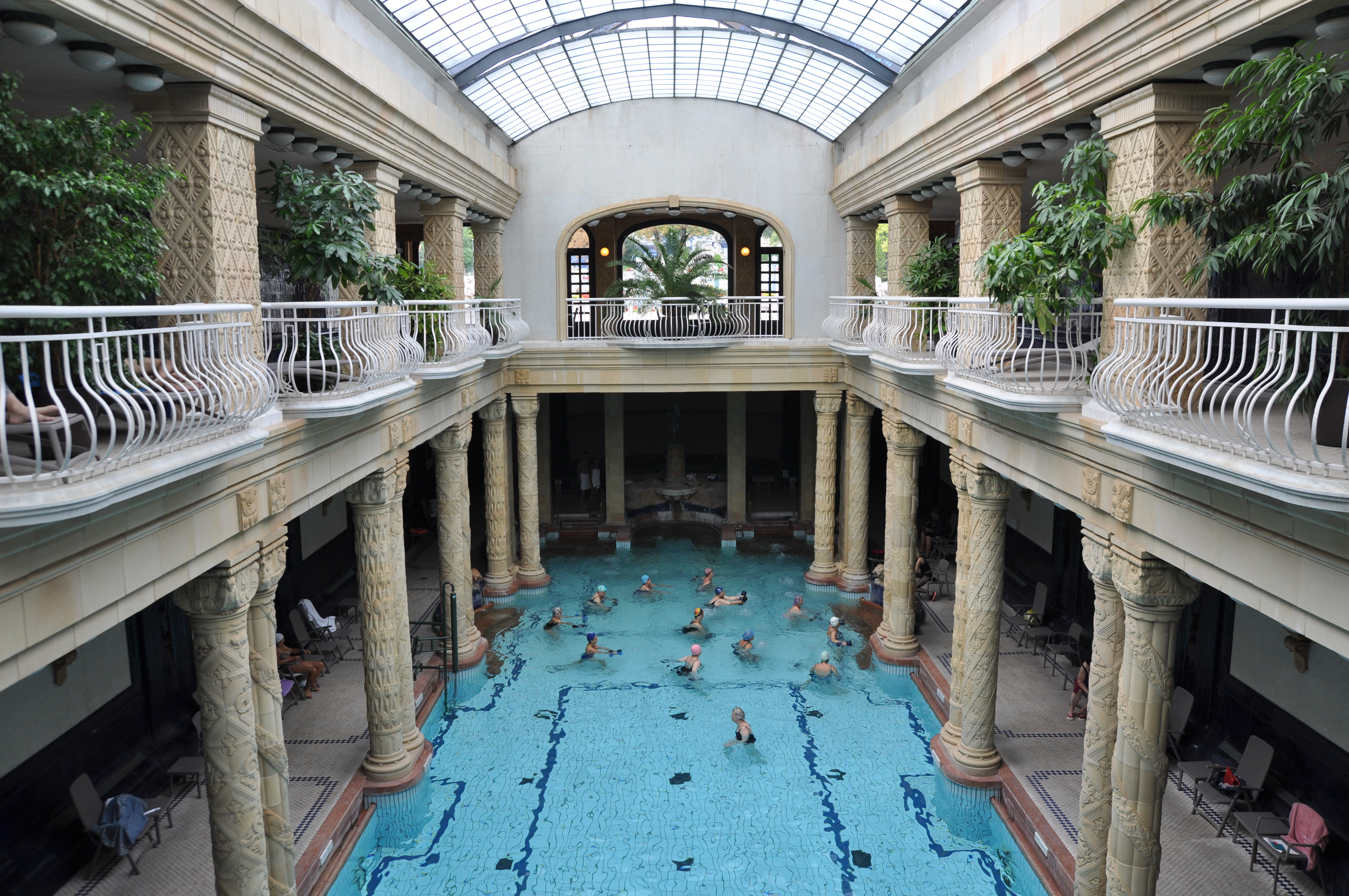
The indoor thermal baths, added in 1934

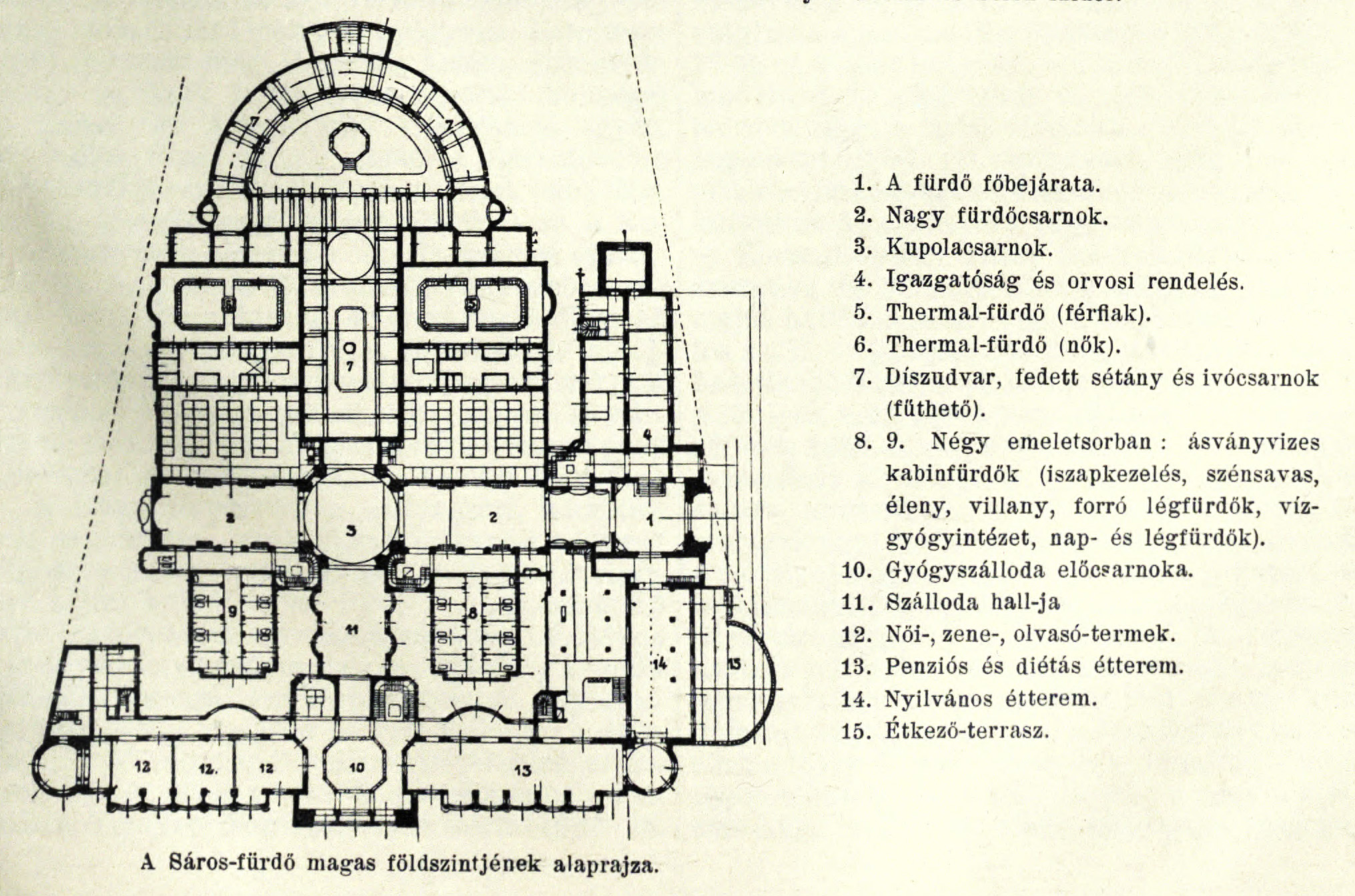
Plan of the Hotel Saint Gellért and Baths, 1912

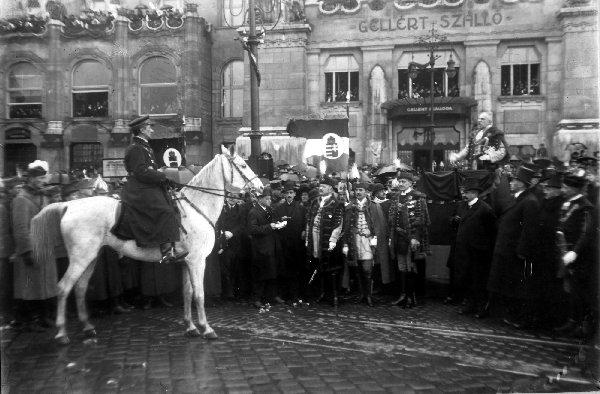
Admiral Miklós Horthy in front of the hotel, November 16, 1919

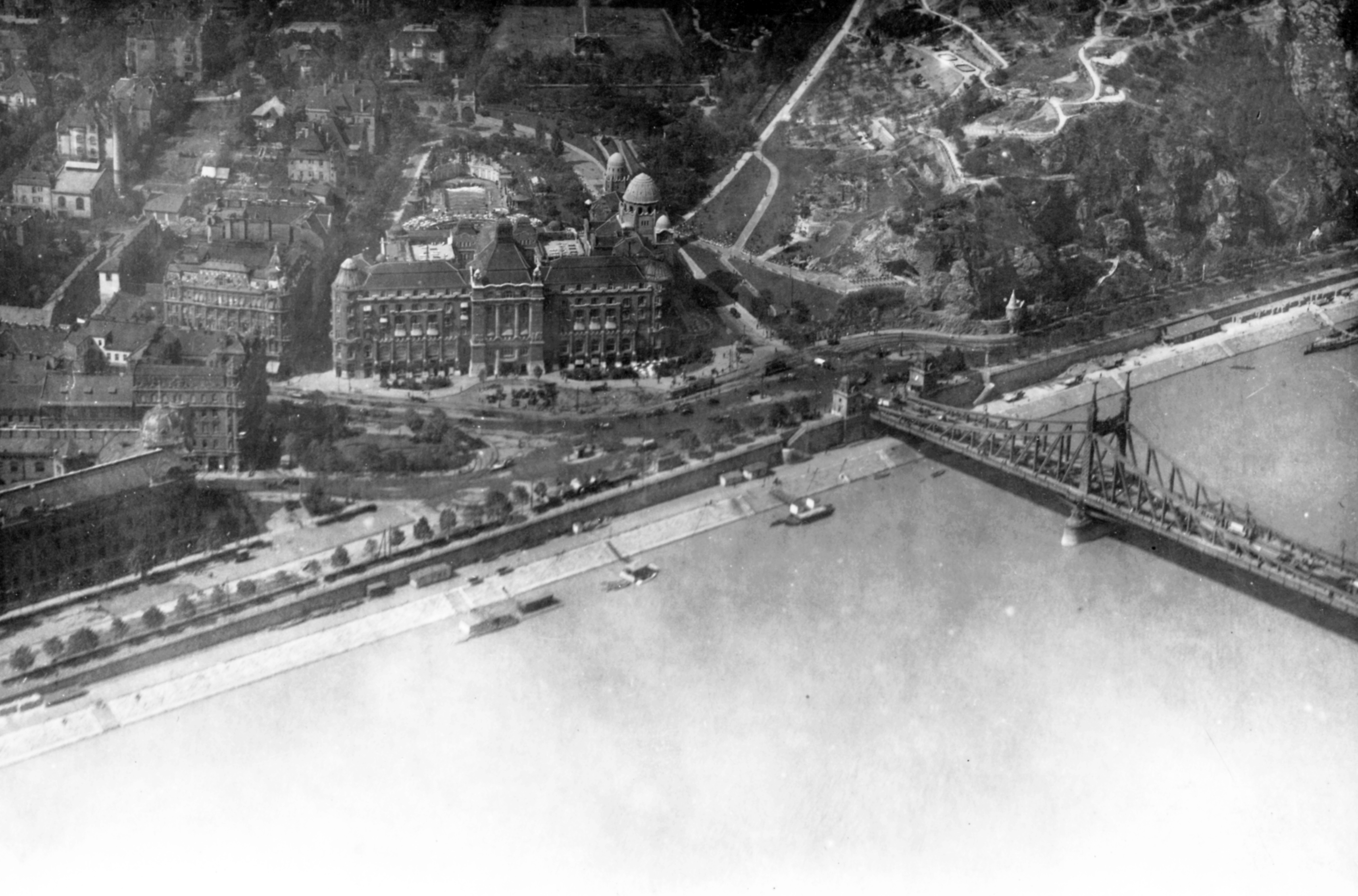
Aerial view of Hotel Saint Gellért, 1930

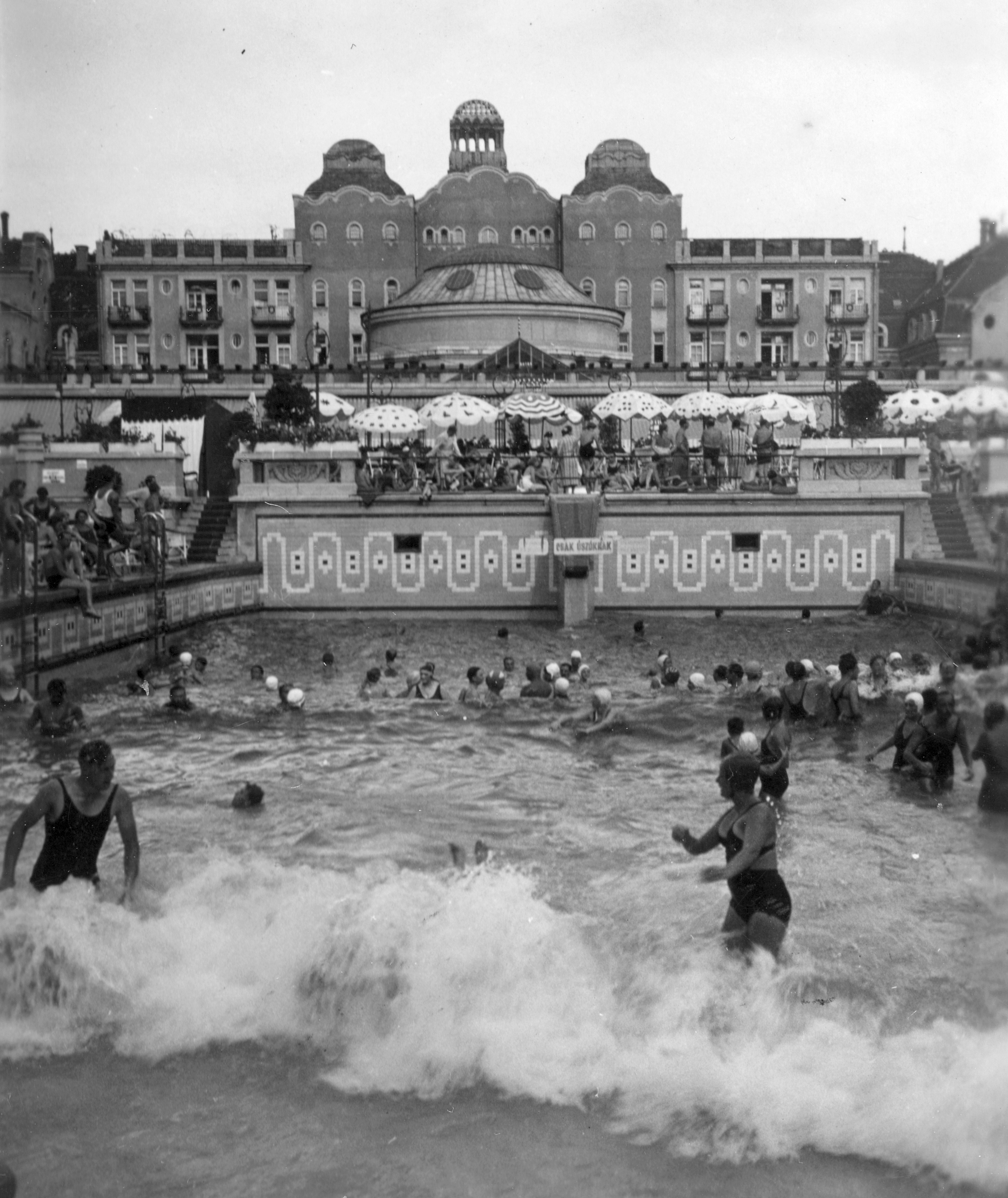
Bathers in the hotel's outdoor wave pool, 1936

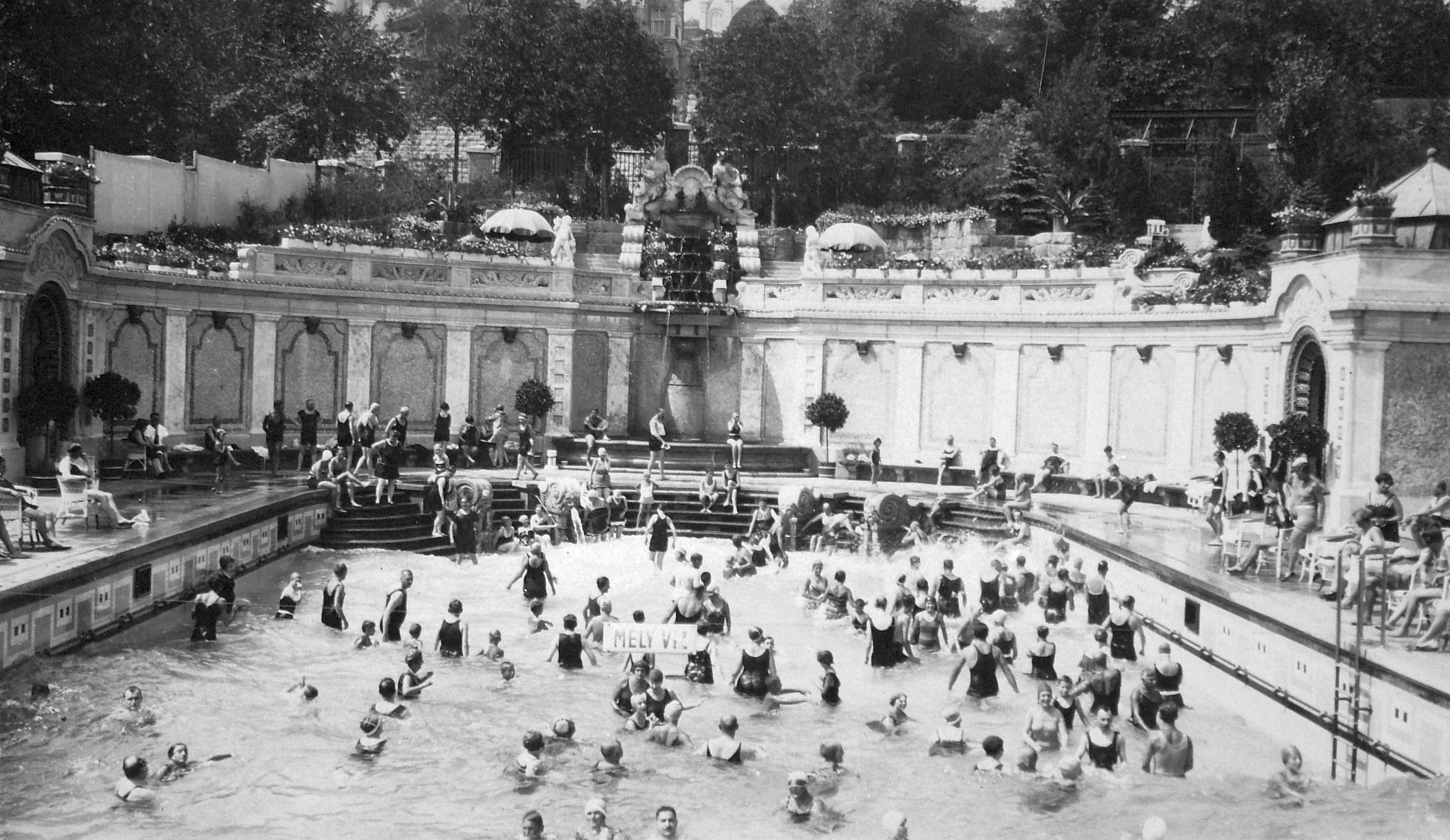
Bathers in the hotel's outdoor wave pool, 1933

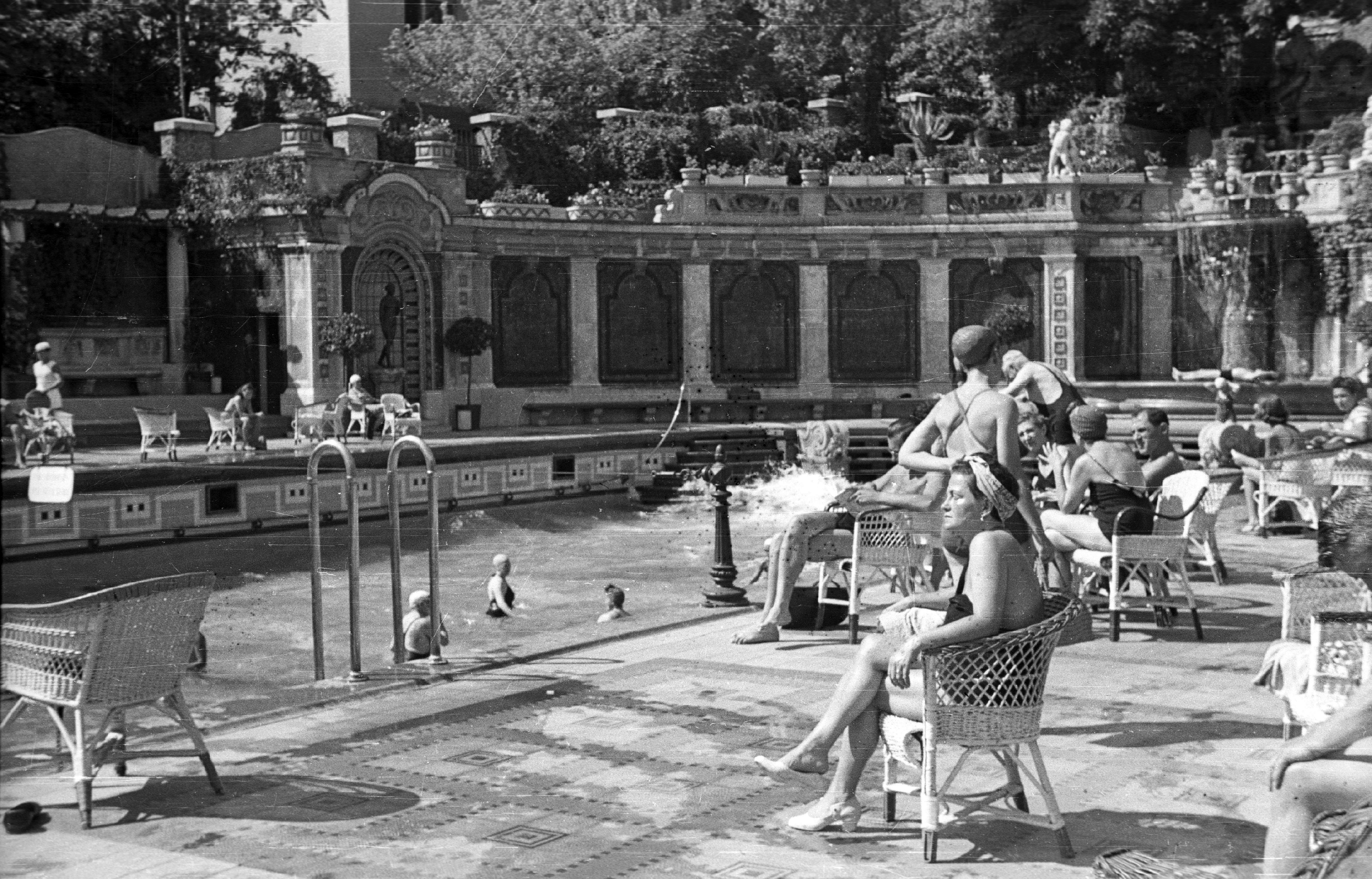
Bathers on the terrace of the hotel's outdoor wave pool, 1939

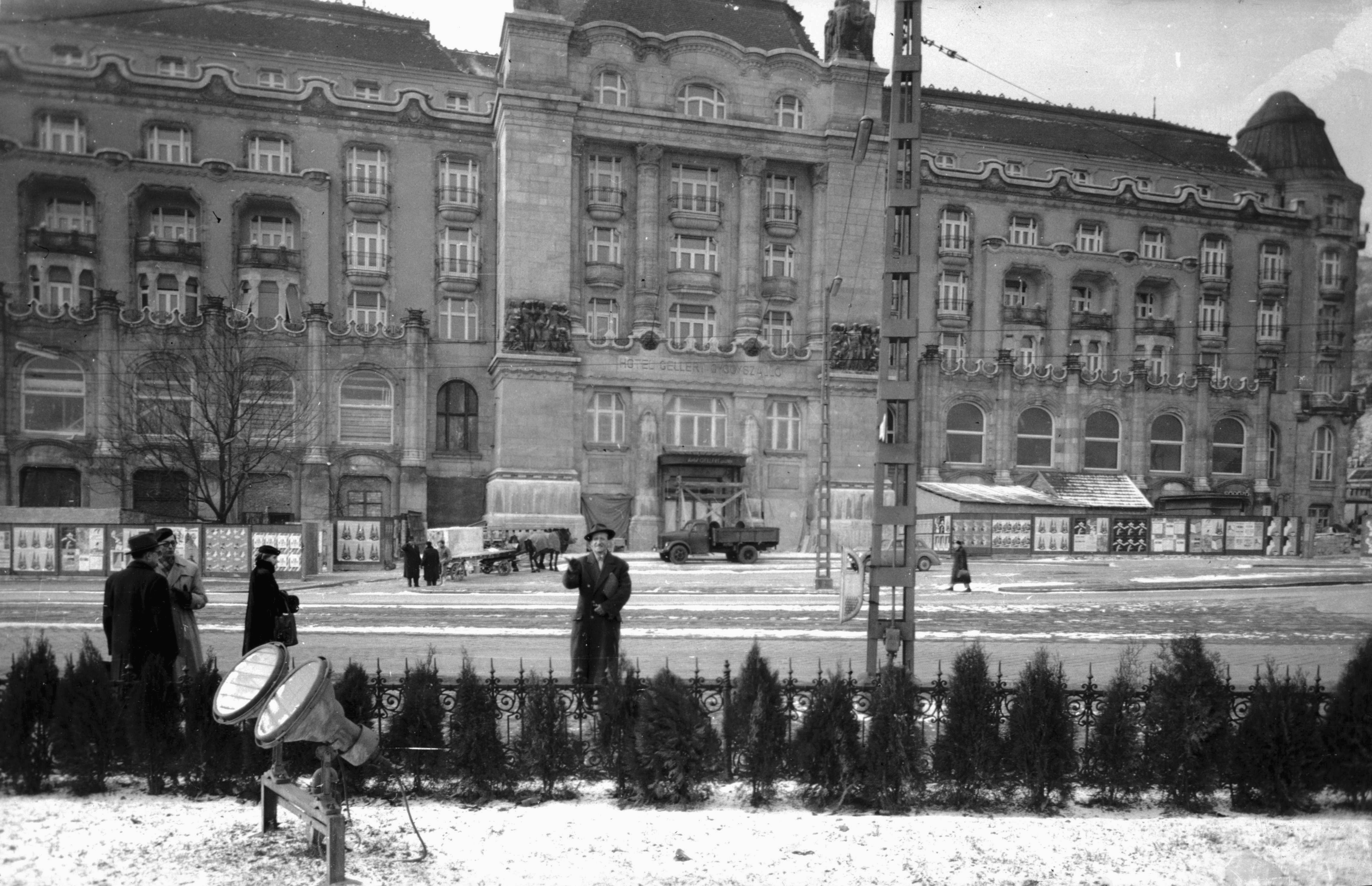
The main Danube wing under restoration, 1960

== See also ==
- Balint Balassi Memorial Sword Award
- Gellért Baths
