= Korda Studios =

Film studio complex in Etyek, Fejér County, Hungary

Coordinates: 47.439°N 18.730°E

- Native name: Korda Filmstúdió
- Founded: 2007; 19 years ago, in Hungary
- Founder: Sándor Demján; Andy Vajna; Peter Munk; Nathaniel Rothschild
- Key people: László Horváth-Varga (CEO)
- Services: ADR; Screening; Catering; MBS Equipment Rental
- Website: kordastudio.hu

Korda Studios (in Hungarian: Korda Filmstúdió) is a film studio complex in the wine-making village of Etyek; hence the nickname Etyekwood. The studio is named after Sir Alexander Korda, Hungarian born British film producer, director and screenwriter, who founded his own film production studios and distribution company, Denham Film Studios in Buckinghamshire, England.

== History ==
Korda Studios were inaugurated in April 2007 and an additional sound stage was built in 2009. The studio was designed by Bastien and Associates Inc.

The first film produced at Korda Studios was Hellboy II: The Golden Army of Universal Studios, directed by Guillermo del Toro. Some scenes from the BBC and Netflix series The Last Kingdom, were filmed there in 2018.

== Layout ==
=== Stages ===
Soundstages	Note	Area (net)	Area details (length x width x height in meters)
Stage 1	In the studio a 10 x 10 x 4.3 meter heatable, coverable water tank with 2 underwater side windows is included. The tank is equipped with a built in circulated filtration system.	1,946 m^{2}	49.4 x 39.4 x 10.75
Stage 2 and 3 ("Twin Studio")	Twin stages, together the area is 3,616 m^{2} The wall between the studios is removable.	1,745 m^{2} 1,769 m^{2}	44.6 x 39.4 x 10.95
Stage 4 ("Tv Studio")		961 m^{2}	39.4 x 24.4 x 10.95
Stage 5		2,310 m^{2}	55 x 42 x 14.05
Stage 6 ("Superstage")		5,856 m^{2}	96 x 61 x 20.05

=== Backlot Sets ===
Korda Studios has 15 hectares of back lot space, as well as 10 hectares of space consisting of existing sets.

Studio	Notes	Area
New York/Brooklyn Set	It was created for the movie Hellboy II: The Golden Army (2008). The backlot includes a full Brooklyn street block with four-story facades on sides, a movie theater, bank, restaurant, repair shop, freight loading docks and fire escapes. The length of the main street is 120 meters which runs into 60 meter long side streets at each end. The width of the paved road is 14.5 meters excluding the 3 and 4m sidewalks on each side.	
Renaissance Set	It was built for the TV series The Borgias (2011–2013). It was designed by Francois Seguin. The set portrays numerous regions of historical Italy. The more than 1 hectare renaissance city has various styled buildings and gates, courtyards, alleys, interiors, prison cell, a piazza and Vatican façade.	1,000+ m^{2}
Medieval Village Set	It was constructed for the TV series World Without End (2012). The set portrays a village from the 13-14th century with various houses, fortress wall, central square and ambulatory. Most of the houses include interiors.	12,000 m^{2}
