= Gellért Baths =

Coordinates: 47°29′1.35″N 19°3′3.5″E

Gellért Bath
- Interactive map of Gellért Bath
- Location: Buda, Budapest, Hungary

History
- Built: 1912 - 1918

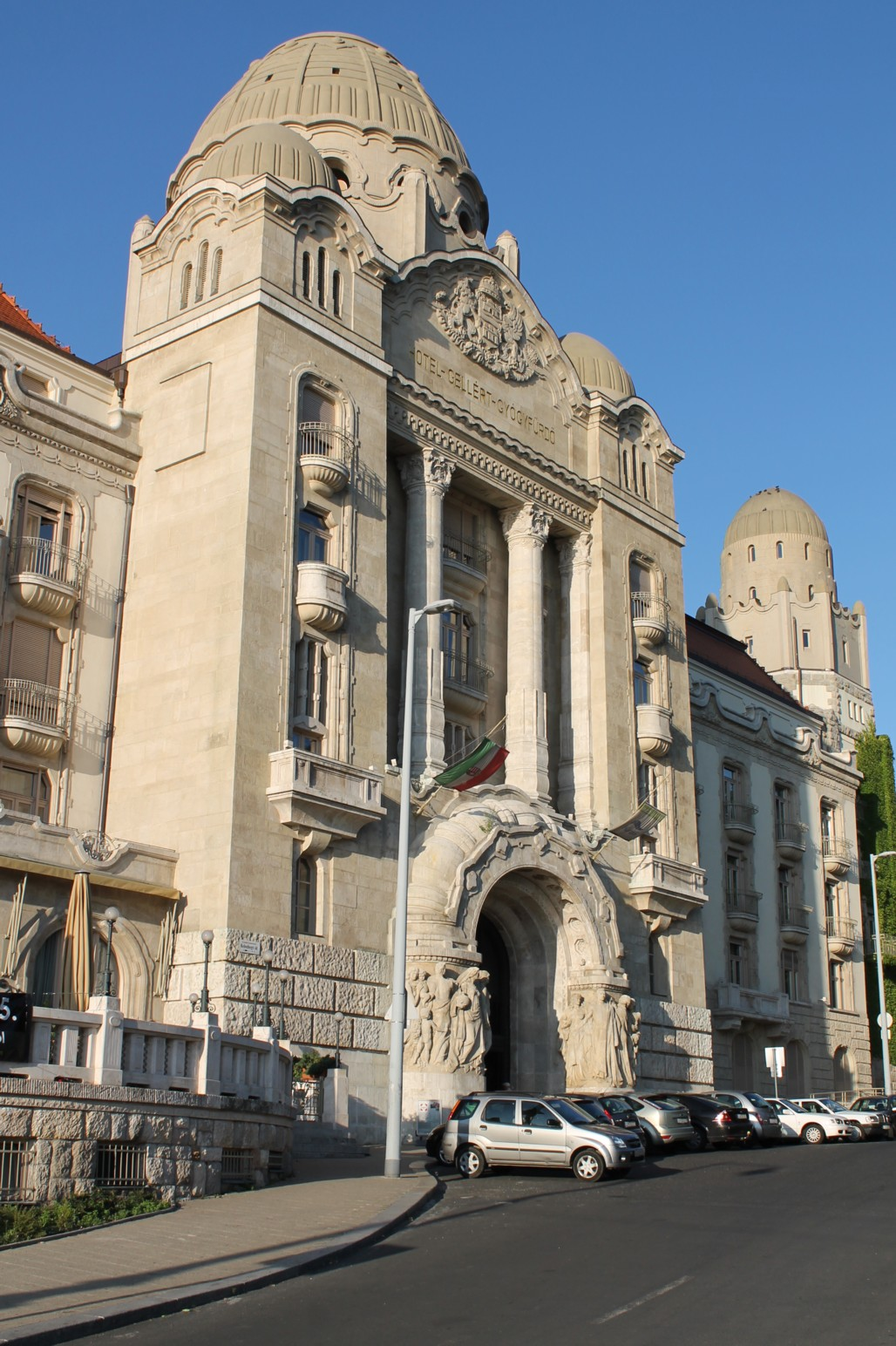
Budapest, Gellért Bath

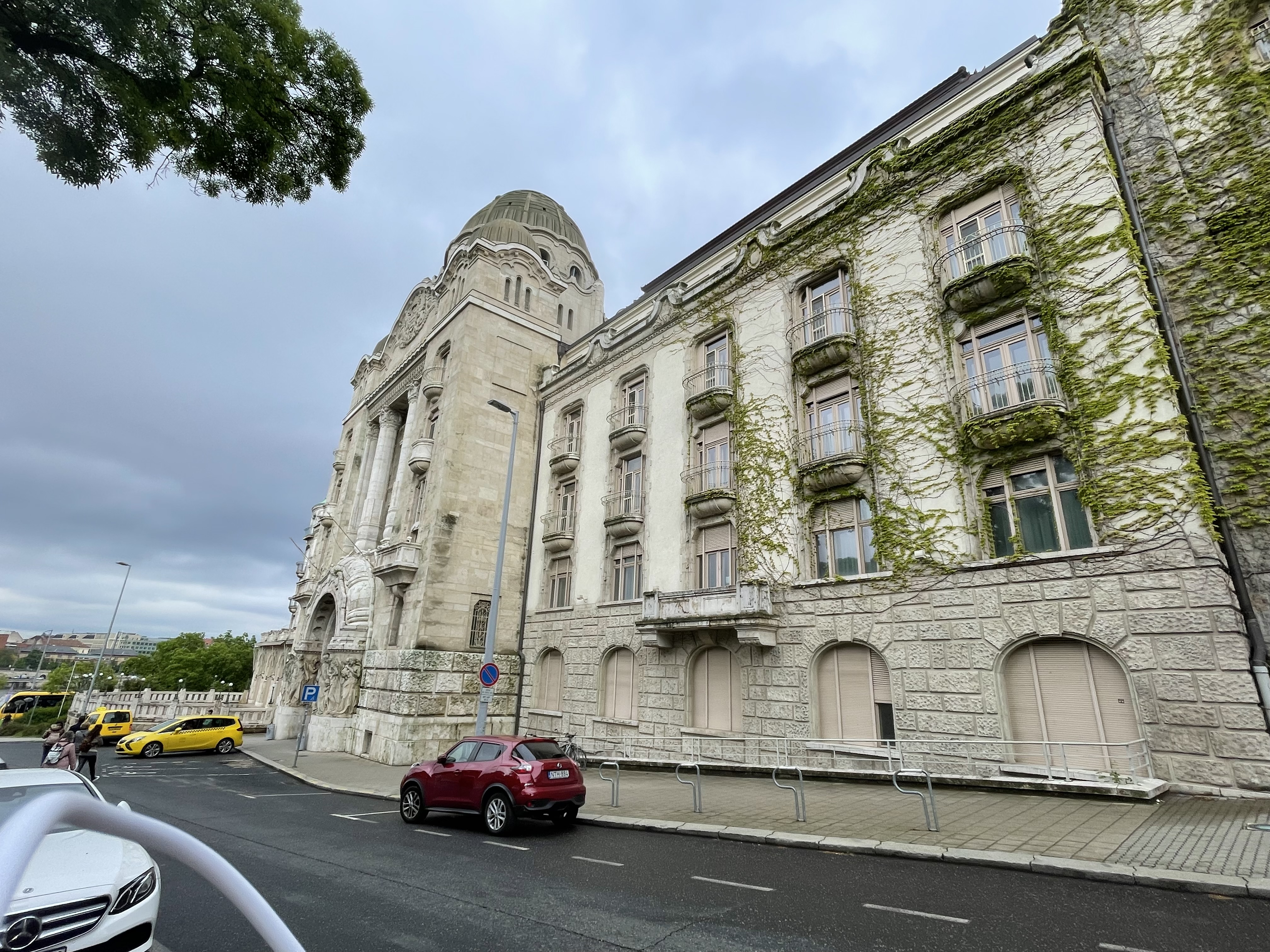
Gellert baths main building

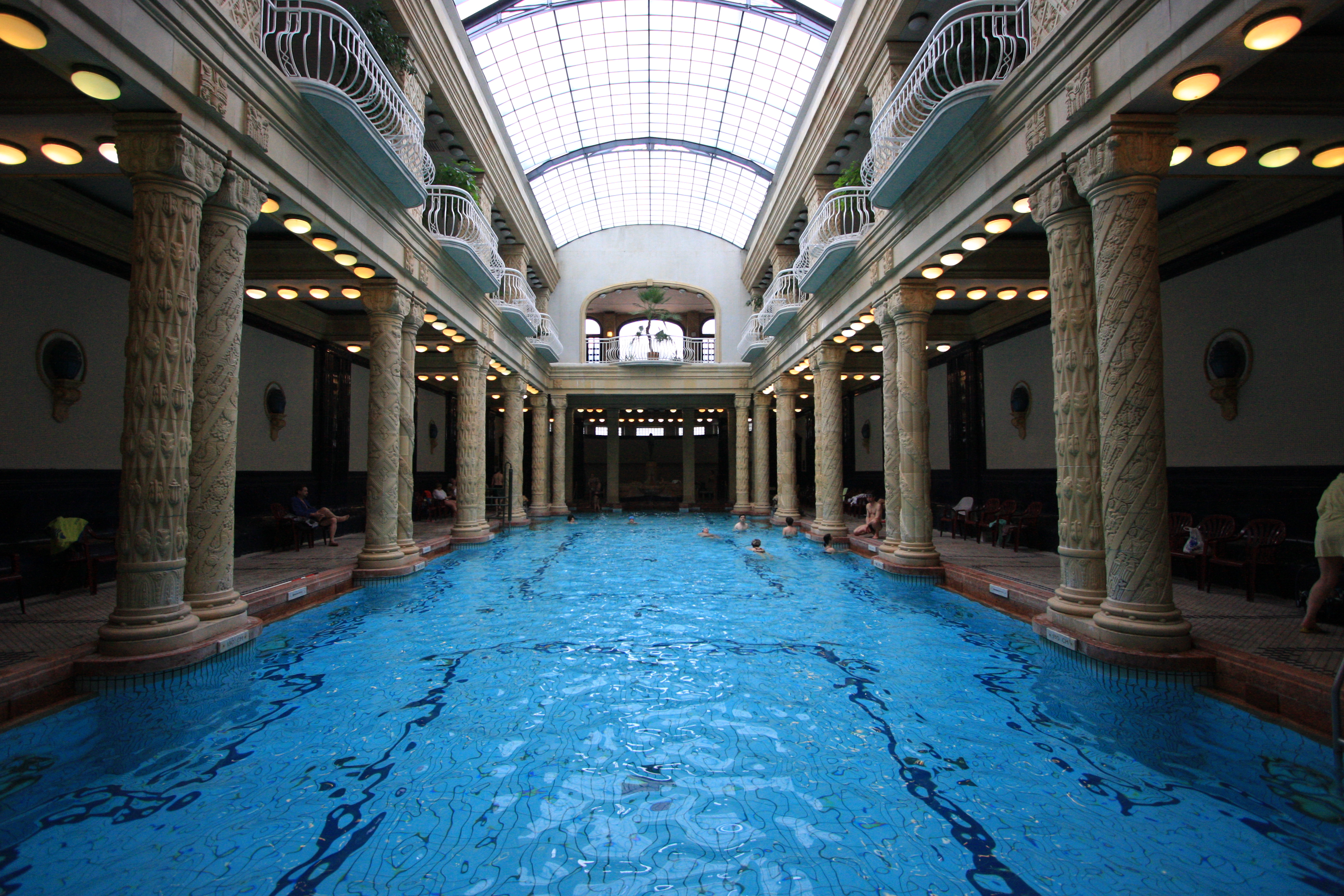
The effervescent swimming pool in Gellért Baths

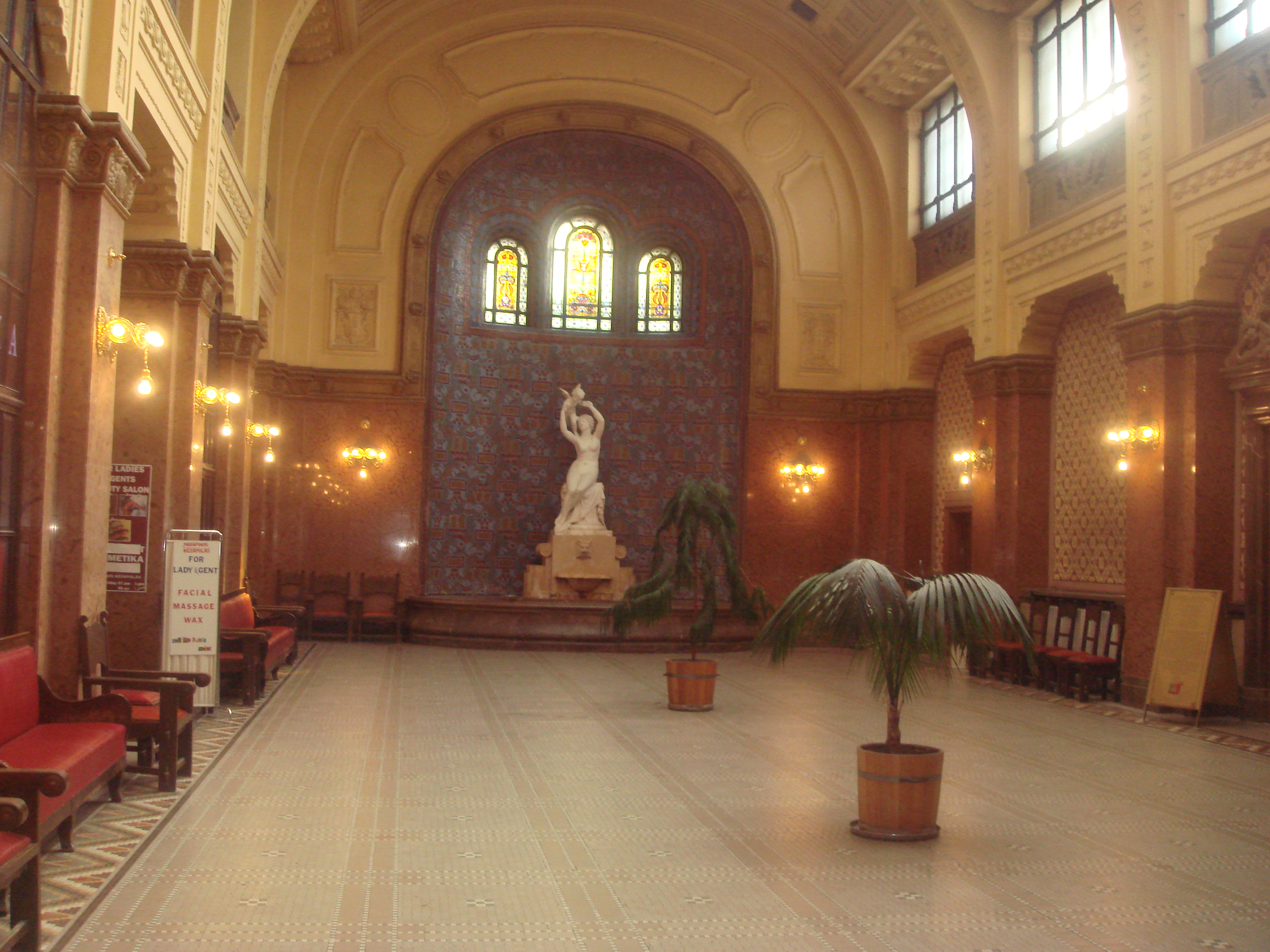
The entrance hall to the Gellért Baths complex

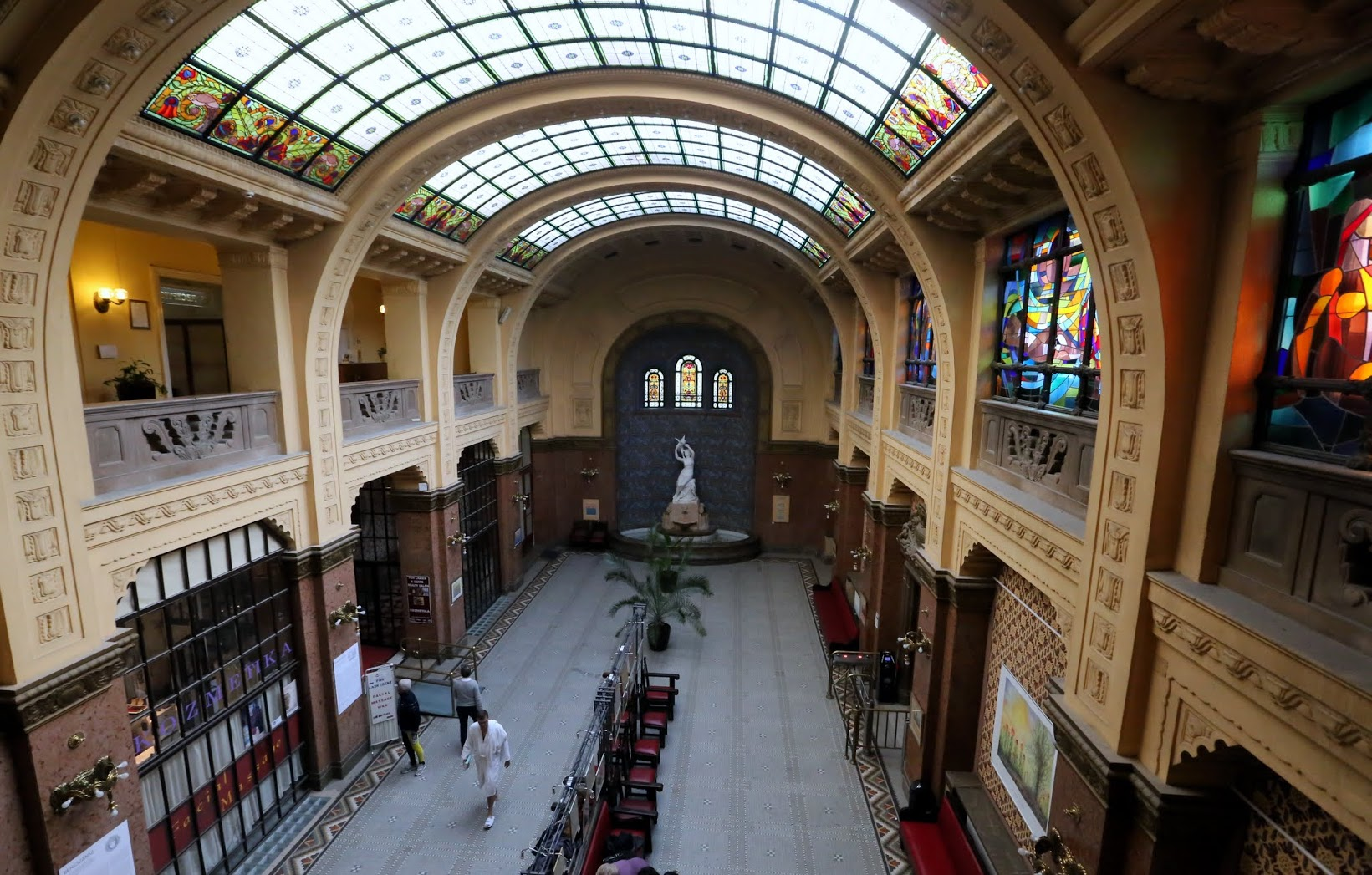
The entrance hall to the Gellért Baths complex

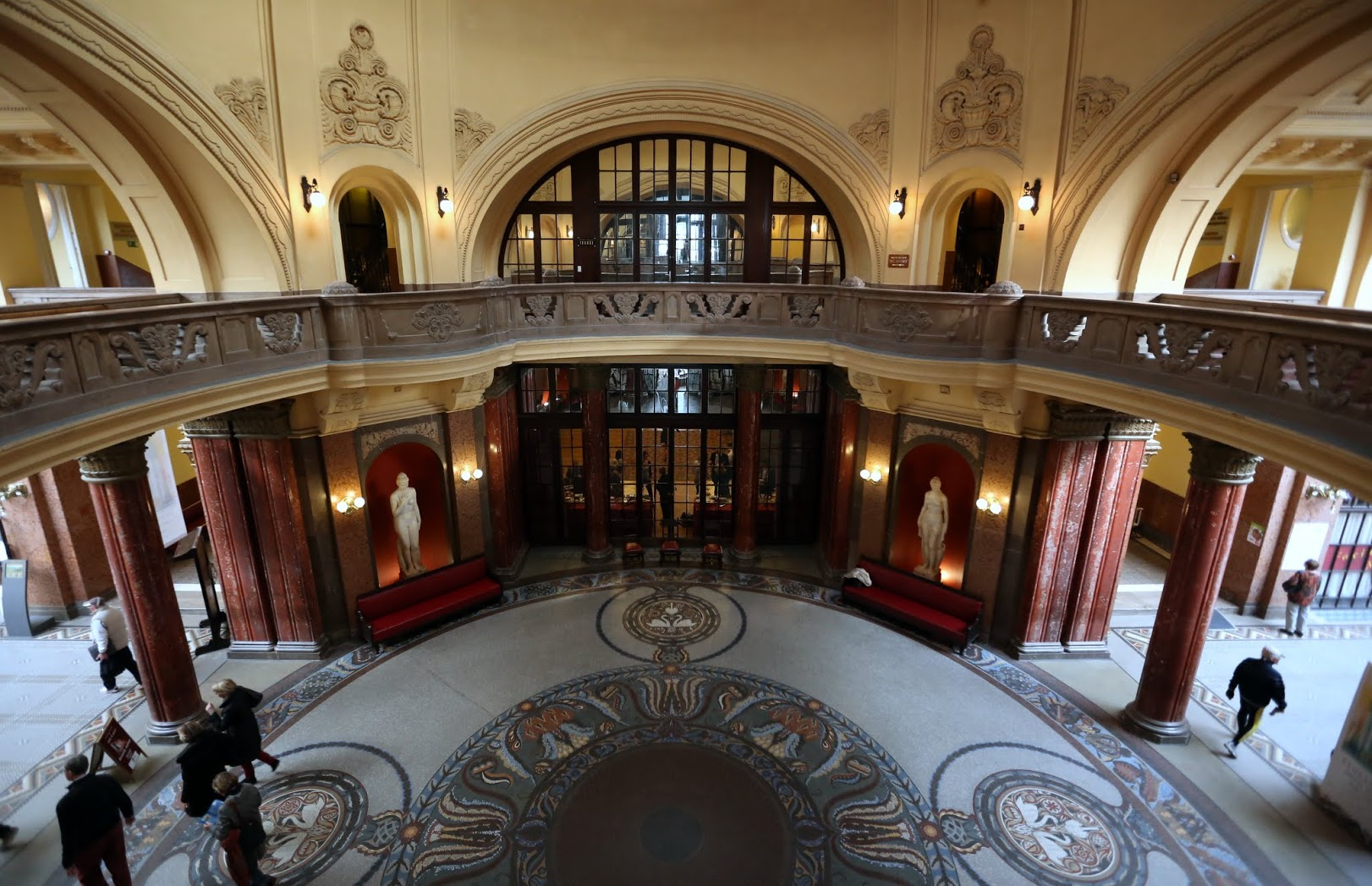
The entrance hall to the Gellért Baths complex

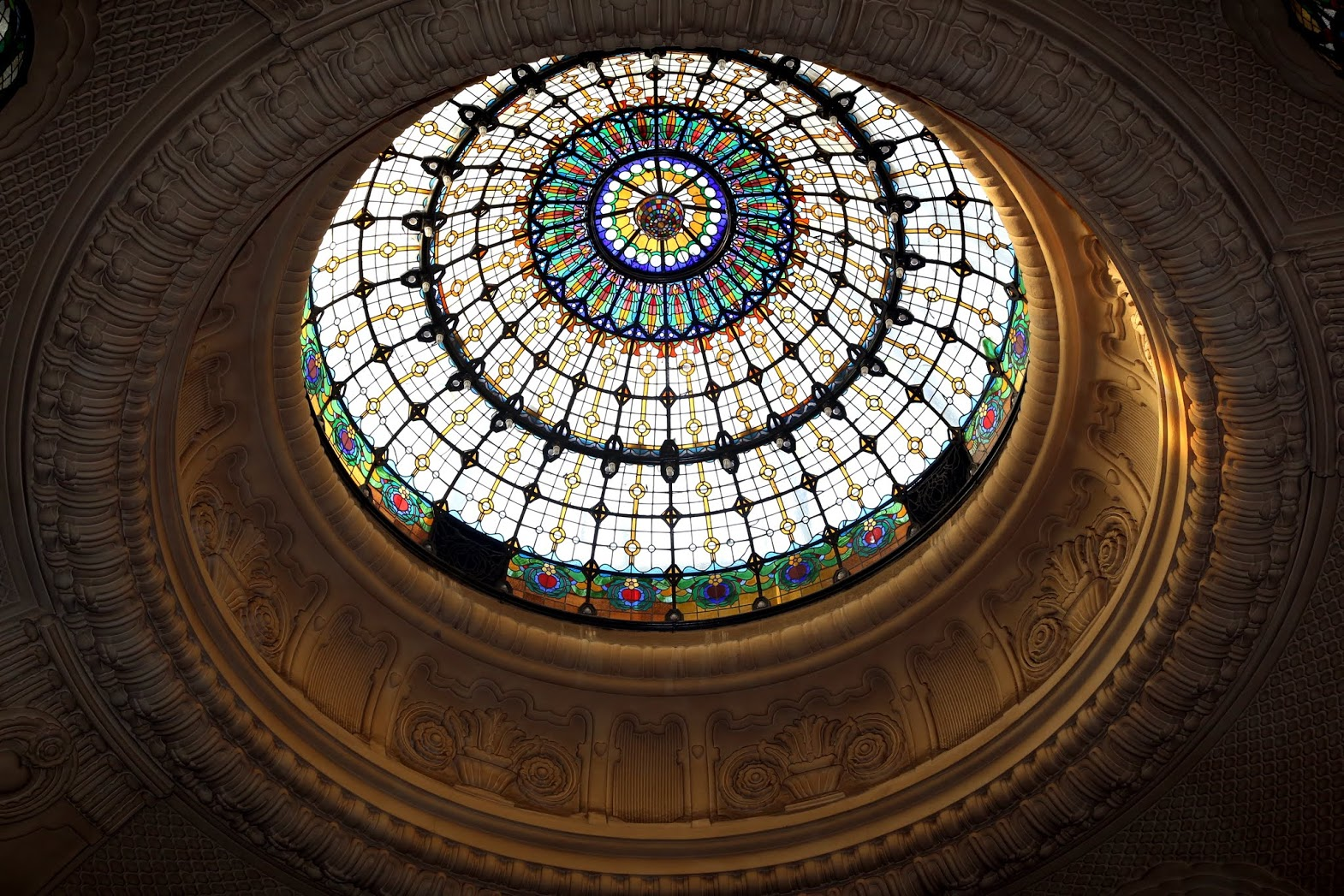
The entrance hall to the Gellért Baths complex

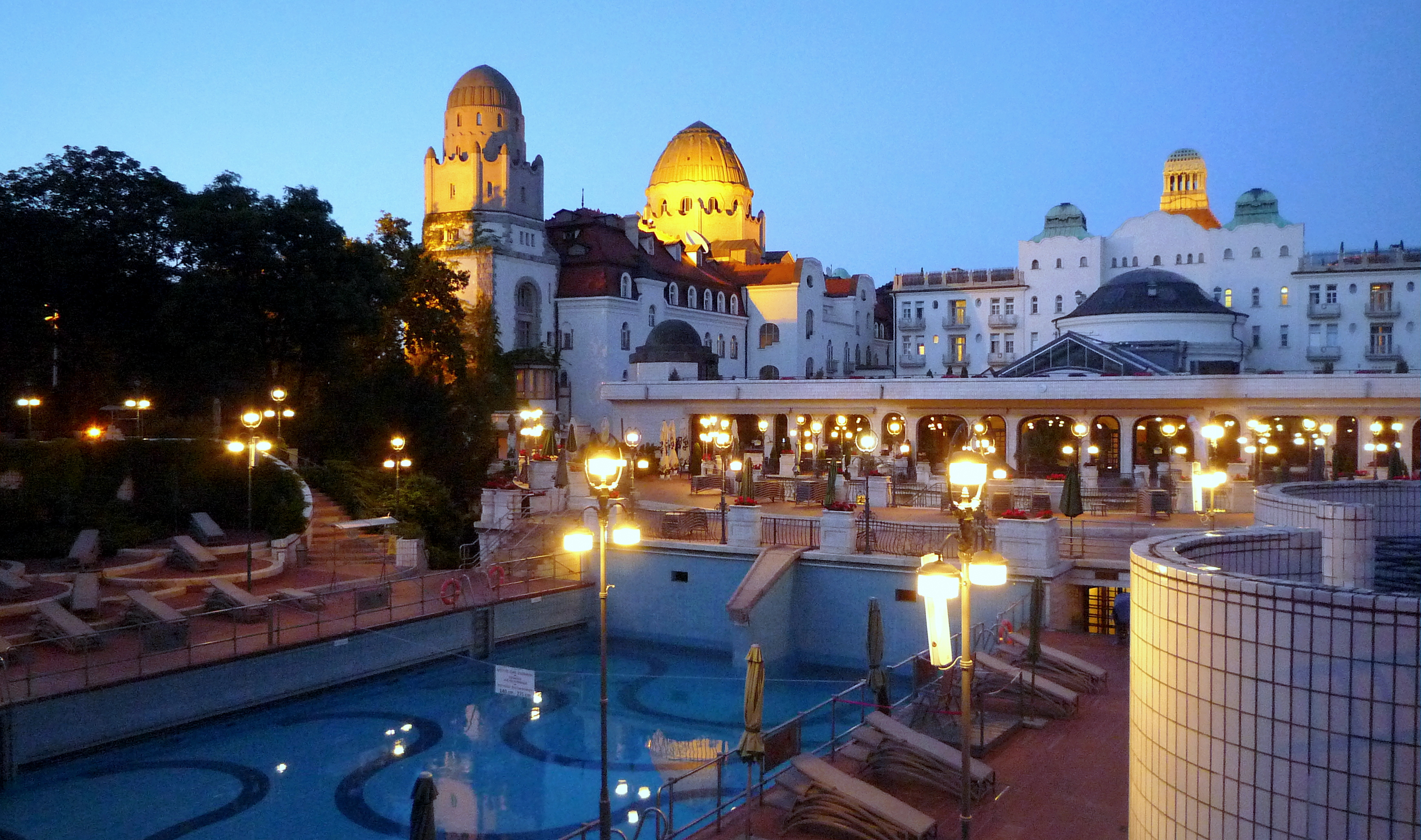
Gellért Baths complex

The Gellért Thermal Bath, also known as the Gellért Baths (Hungarian: Gellért gyógyfürdő [ˈɡɛlːeːrt ˈɟoːcfyrdøː]), is a bath complex in Budapest in Hungary. It is part of the famous Hotel Gellért in Buda.

== History ==
The bath complex was built between 1912 and 1918 in the (Secession) Art Nouveau style. It was damaged during World War II but then rebuilt. References to healing waters in this location are found from as early as the 13th century. A hospital was located on this site during the Middle Ages. During the reign of the Ottoman Empire, baths were also built on this particular site. The "magical healing spring" was used by the Turkish during the 16th and 17th centuries. The bath was called Sárosfürdő ("muddy" bath) because the mineral mud settled at the bottom of pools.

=== Reconstructive work ===
The Gellért Bath underwent its first extensive renovation in 2008. The bath closed only once in its almost century-long existence due to a burst pipe. The Gellért was open even during World War II. Towards the end of the war, the prestigious Art Nouveau women's thermal bath was bombed, destroying the Zsolnay pyrogranite façade and the wooden interior of the dressing rooms. Due to economic condition following the war, the thermal bath was redesigned in a much more puritanical manner. The 2008 reconstruction served to restore the bath to its original splendor.

The baths closed in October 2025 for refurbishment, with a planned reopening in 2028.

== Pools and treatments ==
The Gellért Baths complex includes thermal baths, which are small pools containing water from Gellért hill's mineral hot springs. The water contains calcium, magnesium, hydrocarbonate, alkalis, chloride, sulfate, and fluoride. Medical indications of the water includes degenerative joint illnesses, spine problems, chronic and sub-acute joint inflammations, vertebral disk problems, neuralgia, vasoconstriction and circulatory disturbances; inhalation problems for the treatment of asthma and chronic bronchitis problems. The temperature of the water is between 35 and 40 °C (95 and 104 °F).The thermal baths are decorated beautifully with mosaic tiles.

Gellért Spa is famous for its main hall with gallery and glass roof, built in Art-Nouveau style.

The current bath complex and hotel was opened in 1918 and was expanded in 1927 with an outdoor artificial wave pool and in 1934 with a thermal bath under a glass dome, located in the hotel's former winter garden.

The complex also includes saunas and plunge pools (segregated by gender), an open-air swimming pool which can create artificial waves every 30 minutes and an effervescent swimming pool. A Finnish sauna with cold pool is also enclosed within the complex. Masseuse services are available.

The Gellért Baths were originally separated for ladies and men. Starting in January 2013, all pools are mixed gendered, although it still has two different sections.

Gellért Baths also offer a range of medical services. Towels and swimsuits may be bought in the Spa (renting is no longer allowed following measures against the COVID-19 pandemic). On holidays and at weekends the entrance fee is higher than on workdays.

Indoors, there are four medical pools all 1.2m deep and 70 m² (kept between 35 and 40 degrees Celsius), two plunge pools, two underwater traction pools, a 246 m² swimming pool (27 degrees Celsius), and a warm sitting pool. Outside there is a 500 m² wave pool, a warm sitting pool and a plunge pool.

== Filming location ==
The Gellért Baths have been used as a filming location for the following projects:

- Accumulator 1 (1994) directed by Jan Svěrák
- Royce (1994) directed by Rod Holcomb feat. Jim Belushi
- Cremaster 5 (1997) part of The Cremaster Cycle directed by Matthew Barney
- Víz (Pools of Desire) (1999) directed by Layne Derrick
- K-12 (2019) directed by Melanie Martinez
- I Spy (2002) directed by Betty Thomas feat. Eddie Murphy and Owen Wilson
