= Home Guards (film) =

Home Guards (Veszettek) is a 2015 Hungarian drama film.

It is one of the most expensive movies made in Hungary, with a budget of Euro 2.2 million. It was directed by Krisztina Goda.

== Cast ==
- Iván Fenyő
- Franciska Törőcsik
- Viktor Klem
- Piroska Molnár
- Attila Vidnyánszky
- Anna Györgyi
- Attila Fritz
- Bálint Bán
- Ádám Béli
- Oszkár Nyári
