= Pete Edmunds =

British actor

- Born: Peter Roy Edmunds; Runcorn, Cheshire, England
- Education: De Montfort University, Drama Studio London
- Occupations: Actor; photographer; artist
- Years active: 1994–present

Peter Roy Edmunds is a British actor, photographer and artist based in London. He is best known for playing the series regular character of Peter, the Deputy Manager, in the ITV television comedy series Hotel Getaway. His voice acting work is used in video games, commercials, documentaries, toys, films, audio books and television. In February 2018 he received 8 nominations, including Male Voiceover Artist of the Year, for the One Voice Awards 2018. In March 2019 he was nominated for Best Male Performance - Television Documentary Voiceover, at the One Voice Awards 2019. In March 2020 he received 4 nominations, including Male Voiceover Artist of the Year, for the One Voice Awards 2020. In February 2025 he was nominated for Best Overall Performance - Television Documentary Voiceover, at the One Voice Awards 2025.

== Early life ==
Born in Runcorn, Cheshire to Anglo-Welsh parents, Edmunds was raised in nearby Frodsham and attended Helsby High School. He studied Engineering at De Montfort University, Leicester and worked in IT before training as an actor at Drama Studio London.

== Voice acting career ==
Drama Studio London voice coaches highlighted Edmunds' vocal physiology, describing it as “very unusual - a deep resonant chest-voice combined with a light resonant head-voice" - giving him a unique sound. Upon graduating he began working as a voice actor and voiceover artist alongside his acting career.

=== Selected voice acting work ===
Genre	Client / Title	Role	Agency / Company / Studio	Notes
TV Commercials	A Holly Dolly Christmas (Dolly Parton Music Album)	Voiceover		
TV Commercials	Samsung QLED TV (3 Commercials)	Voiceover	Leo Burnett Worldwide	
TV Commercials	Amazon Books	Voiceover	HHCL	Part of "Amazon Thinking" campaign
TV Commercials	Peugeot 406 (Africa)	Voiceover	Silk Sound, London	
TV Commercials	Daktarin (Johnson & Johnson)	Voiceover	Saatchi & Saatchi	
TV Commercials	Kinect Disneyland Adventures	Voiceover	Disney	
TV Commercials	Schweppes (Netherlands)	Voiceover	Schweppes	
TV Commercials	GetAgent App	Voiceover	The Sound Company	
TV Commercials	AnimalFriends.co.uk / The Secret Life of Pets 2	Voiceover	The Sound Company	Nominated for One Voice Award 2020
TV Commercials	ClearScore	Voice of Keith the Tortoise	The Sound Company	
Web Commercials	Nokia - Essential True Wireless Earphones	Voiceover	Nokia / RichGo	
Audio Books / Stories	RNIB Christmas Appeal 2019 (Animation)	Narrator	RNIB Studios, London	
Audio Books / Stories	Framed (written by Ron Ellis) - Complete & Unabridged	Narrator plus 60 character voices	Magna Story Sound	ISBN 1859034063 ISBN 978-1859034064
Radio Commercials	Best of Bandstand Volume 4 - Music CD	Voiceover	702 Talk Radio / Capetalk	
Radio Commercials	Virgin Sun	Voiceover		
Radio Commercials	La Grange (France)	Voiceover		Nominated for One Voice Award 2018
Documentary	The Making of Riyadh Season (6 episodes)	Narrator	Discovery Channel	Nominated for One Voice Award 2020
Documentary	The Kitchen with Chef Marwan (8 episodes)	Narrator (8 episodes) Co-Writer (4 episodes)	Warner Bros Discovery	Nominated for One Voice Award 2025
Documentary	Nokia: The Birth of Ozo	Narrator		Nominated for One Voice Award 2018
Documentary	Rome - Corporate Documentary	Narrator		Nominated for One Voice Award 2018
Documentary	UK Money Laundering	Narrator		Nominated for One Voice Award 2019
Video games	The Entropy Centre	Tannoy	Playstack / Stubby Games	
Video games	Nexon - Champions Rising:Legends of Elusia	Intro / Promo Voice	Shepperton Studios	Nominated for One Voice Award 2018
Toys	Star Wars Force Link Toy	Voice of Qui-Gon Jinn	LucasFilm Ltd / Disney	Nominated for One Voice Award 2018
Corporate / Explainer	IKEA - The New Click and Collect Service	Narrator	IKEA Austria	Nominated for One Voice Award 2018
Corporate / Explainer	Allen & Overy - Anatomy of a Deal	Narrator	Silk Sound, London	
Corporate / Explainer	KIA Optima Sportwagon - 8 Product Promo Films	Voiceover	Innocean Worldwide	
Corporate / Explainer	Nationwide Building Society - ISAs Explained	Narrator (3 Videos)	Smoke & Mirrors, London	
Corporate / Explainer	BNP Paribas Securities Services	Narrator	BNP Paribas	
Character	RAF Bentley Priory Museum (Audio Guide)	Cockney Barman Voice	Centre Screen / SNK	

== Acting career ==
Edmunds has worked in film, television, theatre, commercials and standup comedy - most notably in the main cast role of Peter, the hapless deputy manager, in the British comedy series Hotel Getaway (ITV). In Hotel Getaway, the actors' performances were completely improvised, whilst numerous hidden cameras captured the footage. On film he acted alongside Toyah Willcox and Shirley Anne Field in the feel-good comedy feature The Power of Three. Prior to that he worked on a number of short films – playing the Newscaster in Car Stories by Hungarian auteur Krisztina Goda, the lead role of Tony in Killing Time by BAFTA award-winning screenwriter Ed Whitmore and an emotionally charged performance as the co-lead, playing The Gardener in Lost Property by Isabelle Livingstone. On the London stage he has appeared in several productions, playing roles as diverse as a forensic psychologist in Doomsday and a barfly in Time Out Critics’ Choice, Blue Eyes Red. Edmunds also performed stand-up in London and has featured as an in-vision performer in TV commercials for brands such as Nissan, Specsavers, Disney, Amazon and MTV.

=== Filmography ===
Year	Title	Role	Company	Notes
1995	Car Stories	Radio Newscaster (voice)		Short Film - Written / Directed by Krisztina Goda
1995	Killing Time	Tony (Lead)		Short Film - Written / Directed by Ed Whitmore
1995	The Verb	Terry Christian Impression	Channel 4	TV
1996	EastEnders	DI Wallace	BBC	TV series (1 episode)
1996	Expert Witness	Det. Constable Turner	ITV	TV series documentary, episode: "The Bomb Maker"
1996	Crime Monthly	DS Nicholson (Lead)	ITV	TV series documentary (1 episode)
1997	Blind Men	Tannoy Announcer (voice)	ITV	TV series, episode: "Sneaking the Sneck"
2000	The Human Zoo	Bridegroom	ITV	TV series documentary (1 episode)
2000–2003	Hotel Getaway	Peter - Deputy Manager	ITV	TV series, main cast (8 episodes)
2009	Coronation Street	PC Smith	ITV	TV series, Recurring (2 episodes)
2009	Lost Property	The Gardener (Co-Lead)		Short Film
2011	The Power of Three	James		Film
2014	Candlestick	Constable Peck		Film
2017	Champions Rising : Legends of Elusia	Intro / Promo Voice	Nexon	Video / Computer Game
2019	Coronation Street	Fire Officer - Incident Commander	ITV	TV series, Recurring (2 episodes)

=== Theatre ===
Year	Title	Role	Theatre	Notes
1995	Beast of a Different Burden	Tommy	Kings Head Theatre, London	
1997	Blue Eyes Red	Joe	White Bear Theatre, London	Time Out (London) - Critics Choice
1998	Doomsday	Doctor Martin Brymen	Southwark Playhouse, London	
2004	Banana Cabaret	Standup Comedy	The Bedford, London	

== Photography and art ==
Edmunds started out painting with watercolour and later studied technical drawing as part of his engineering qualifications. He states that "photography offered the perfect blend of art and science". He travelled with his engineering work and found urban artistic inspiration in New York, Paris, Tokyo and Toronto. His first photography exhibition, titled "Cross Section", took place at Putney Library, London from June 14 to July 4, 2015. In July 2017, his photograph of a running group in Delamere Forest, Cheshire won third prize in the PEFC UK & Ireland competition and was then put forward for the PEFC International "2017 PEFC Photographer of the Year" award. His photographs are featured on the BBC News website and the Vogue (PhotoVogue) website, with his image Rethink I being selected by the PhotoVogue curators for the daily Best Of collection. Saatchi Art featured Edmunds' photographs in three curated collections during 2015; New Photography, Limited Edition Photographs and Inspired by Impressionism. His photographic artworks have been collected across four continents.

== Awards and nominations ==
=== Voice acting / voiceover ===
Year	Award	Category	Nominated work	Result
2018	One Voice Awards	Voiceover Artist of the Year - Male	Rome (Corporate Documentary)	Nominated
2018	One Voice Awards	Best Overall Performance - Toys / Physical Games	Star Wars Force Link Toy (Qui-Gon Jinn)	Nominated
2018	One Voice Awards	Best Male Performance - Gaming	Nexon - Champions Rising:Legends of Elusia (Intro/Promo Voice)	Nominated
2018	One Voice Awards	Best Male Performance - Television Documentary	Nokia - The Birth of Ozo	Nominated
2018	One Voice Awards	Best Male Performance - Radio Commercials	La Grange Restaurant (3rd Voice)	Nominated
2018	One Voice Awards	Best Overall Performance - Corporate / Explainer	IKEA - The New Click and Collect Service	Nominated
2018	One Voice Awards	Best Overall Performance - Telephony / IVR	Daily Mail / DMG Media - Queue Message	Nominated
2018	One Voice Awards	Best Overall Performance - E-Learning	Equity Crowdfunding - Part 4	Nominated
2019	One Voice Awards	Best Male Performance - Television Documentary	UK Money Laundering	Nominated
2020	One Voice Awards	Best Male Performance - Television Documentary	Discovery Channel - The Making of Riyadh Season	Nominated
2020	One Voice Awards	Best Male Performance - Television/Web Commercials	AnimalFriends.co.uk / The Secret Life of Pets 2	Nominated
2020	One Voice Awards	Best Male Performance - Animation Character	Captain Jack Rackham - Pirate Experience	Nominated
2020	One Voice Awards	Voiceover Artist of the Year - Male	Secret Life of Pets 2 / Riyadh Season / Pirate Experience / RNIB Christmas 2019	Nominated
2025	One Voice Awards	Best Overall Performance - Television Documentary	Warner Bros Discovery - The Kitchen with Chef Marwan	Nominated
