= Dávid Géczy =

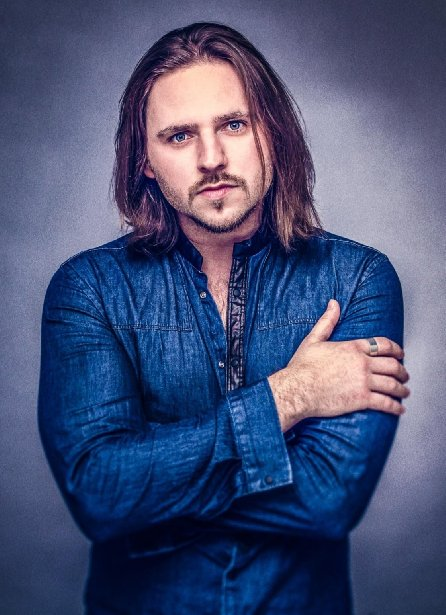
- Dávid Géczy in 2014
- Born: 6 June 1981 (age 45); Budapest, Hungary
- Occupation: Film director
- Years active: 2006−present

Dávid Géczy (born 6 June 1981) is a Hungarian film director and screenwriter. He is a winner of Chicago Silver Hugo, Cannes Silver Dolphin and Berlin Red Dot.

== Life ==
Dávid Géczy was born and raised in Budapest, Hungary. His interest in movies began when he was young. He worked in video stores, cinemas and for Film Magazines.

He graduated from Pázmány Péter Catholic University, Faculty of Humanities and Social Sciences, where he studied Aesthetics and Communication Studies (Film, TV specialization) in 2006.

His father, Bálint Géczy is a film and TV producer, PR expert, Deputy Head of Directorate-General of the Hungarian Press and Communication. His grandfather József Géczy was a writer and poet.

== Career ==
After graduating from university, he directed TV shows, advertisements and commercials for the internet and around 60 television channels. In 2007 his first short movie, Hangár was shot. He was the co-director of the play Hamlet-illúziók (Hamlet-illusions) which was a unique combination of theater and movie tools.

He has directed national and international videoclips and also an authentically reconstructed documentary: Csepeli kettős gyilkosság (Double murder in Csepel), based on a crime in 2009 (similar to the investigative documentaries produced by BBC Crime).

Since 2013 he has been involved in more image spots of Liszt Academy of Music. The first image clip of Academy, called Lisztérium - Ahol él a zene (Lisztery - where the music lives), was directed by Dávid in 2015. This clip was presented by Mezzo TV and BBC and won the following Awards in that year:

Silver Hugo Award in 51st Chicago International Film Festival, Red Dot Award in 60th Red Dot Design Award, 12. Golden Eye Cinematographer Festival's Award in Advertisement Category, organised by Hungarian Society of Cinematographers.

This short movie has also contributed Liszt Academy of Music to receive Design Management Award of Hungarian Design Council.

In 2012 his third short movie, Vér és tűsarok (Blood and High Heels) was part of the Short Film Corner Programme at the Cannes Film Festival.

He had got government financial support for shooting A győztes (The winner) short movie in 2013. The movie was selected in Odense International Film Festival Programme in 2015 and also was selected in BestOFF15 selection of the Festival organiser Danish Film Institute, among the best 11 movies. The film was one of the four Hungarian films that were selected into the Special Screening section as the focus of the 12th Akbank Short Film Festival (2016) in Turkey. Géczy Dávid were invited to take part in the roundtable-discussion called Experiences as well as Elma Tataragic (curator of Sarajevo Film Festival), Carter Pilcher (CEO and funder of ShortsTV International) and Gábor Hörcher (Hungarian director).

His first full-length feature Game Over Club, a black comedy movie was supposed to debut in Autumn 2019.

== Filmography ==
| Year | Title | Country | Genre/type | Director | Screenwriter | Other |
|---|---|---|---|---|---|---|
| 2023 | Have a Nice Apocalypse | Hungary | Short film | Yes | | |
| 2022 | Rodolfo - Vigyázat, csalok! | Hungary | Documentary film | Yes | | |
| 2022 | Róbert Dolák-Saly - Sose félj! (Pszicho) (Don't Be Afraid) | Hungary | Music video | Yes | Yes | cinematographer |
| 2021 | Róbert Dolák-Saly - Ahogy a szívén kifér (Apák napjára) | Hungary | Music video | Yes | Yes | cinematographer |
| 2020 | Ma is meghaltam százszor | Hungary | Documentary film | Yes | | cinematographer |
| 2020 | Genocide in Pozsonyligetfalu | Hungary | Documentary film | Yes | | |
| 2019 | Game Over Club | Hungary | Feature film | Yes | Yes | |
| 2019 | Róbert Dolák-Saly - Nélkülem a világ (A nárcizmus dala) | Hungary | Music video | Yes | Yes | |
| 2018 | Mano (Mano Botond Raduly) – The Sound of Freedom | Hungary | Music video | Yes | | |
| 2017 | Mindig karácsony (Kiscsillag) | Hungary | Music video | Yes | | cinematographer |
| 2018 | Hunting Partners (orig. Vadásztársak) | Hungary | Documentary film | Yes | | |
| 2017 | Gyújts egy gyertyát a Földért (Bella Bagdi and the choir of Sing from the Bakáts Square Musical Primary School) | Hungary | Music video | Yes | | |
| 2017 | Tenyeremből el (Kiscsillag) | Hungary | Music video | Yes | | |
| 2017 | Take Me For A Ride (Adam Jona) | Hungary | Music video | Yes | | |
| 2016 | Mi lett veled? (Heni Dér) | Hungary | Music video | Yes | | |
| 2015 | Bújócska (Kiscsillag) | Hungary | Music video | Yes | | |
| 2015 | Bucket List (Márton Vojnits) | Hungary | Music video | Yes | | |
| 2015 | A csepeli kettős gyilkosság – hatalmat mindenáron | Hungary | Documentary film | Yes | | |
| 2015 | Dr. Alban – Hurricane | Sweden | Music video | Yes | | |
| 2015 | Kullai Tímea – Szíveddel suttogsz | Hungary | Music video | Yes | | |
| 2014 | The Winner | Hungary | Short | Yes | Yes | |
| 2013 | Tolvai Reny – Playdate | Hungary | Music video | Yes | | |
| 2013 | Humánus Alapítványi Általános Iskola | Hungary | Short (beneficence) | Yes | | |
| 2012 | Blood and High Heels | Hungary | Short | Yes | Yes | |
| 2011 | Stenk – Hangover Disco | Hungary | Music video | Yes | | |
| 2010 | Animal Cannibals – Szájkarate | Hungary | Music video | Yes | | |
| 2010 | Stricik | Hungary | Short | Yes | Yes | |
| 2007 | Hangár | Hungary | Short | Yes | Yes | |
| 2006 | Eastern | Hungary | Short western movie | Yes | | |
| 2006 | Horog | Hungary | exam film | Yes | | |
| 2005 | Családi Kötelék | Hungary | exam film | Yes | | |
| 2005 | Szekszárdi Örökség | Hungary | Short | Yes | | |
| 2004 | Őrültek | Hungary | Feature demo | Yes | | |
| 2003 | Falu Skizó | Hungary | Short | Yes | | |
| 2002 | Részegségek és tobzódások | Hungary | Short | Yes | | |

== Television ==
| Year | Title | Country | Genre/type | Director | Other |
|---|---|---|---|---|---|
| 2026 | 8000 méter – Amikor a hegy dönt | Hungary | Documentary TV-Series for Spektrum TV | Yes | Cinematographer |
| 2024 | Minek ment oda | Hungary | Documentary TV-Series for Spektrum TV | Yes | Cinematographer |
| 2022 | Abrakadabra | Hungary | „doku-reality” miniseries for AMC Networks International Central Europe and Spektrum TV | Yes | Cinematographer, coproducer |
| 2022 | Abrakadabra | Czech Republic | „doku-reality” miniseries for AMC Networks International Central Europe and Televize Spektrum | Yes | Cinematographer, coproducer |
| 2021 | Carpathian Rhapsody | Hungary | Concert film for Mezzo TV | | Creative producer |
| 2020 | Concerto Budapest & Kremerata Baltica | France | Concert film for Mezzo TV | | director of Photography |
| 2018 | True Musicians (orig. Született muzsikusok) | Hungary | „doku-reality” miniseries | Yes | |
| 2017 | Szabó Zoltán, egy csodálatos elme | Hungary | educational series | Yes | |
| 2017 | A két gróf Andrássy Gyula | Hungary | educational series | Yes | |
| 2016 | Kurtág 90 - Concerto Budapest | Hungary | television coverage (life concert) | Yes | |
| 2014 | Ég, föld, férfi, nő | Hungary | educational series | Yes | |
| 2013 | Életművész | Hungary | reality show | Yes | |
| 2010 | Lakkoz, Keres | Hungary | TV film adaptation of Szilárd Podmaniczky novel Szép magyar szó-kép-tár | Yes | Screenwriter |
| ? | „Ezek megőrültek” | Hungary | TV2 reality show | Assistant director | |
| 2008-2009 | „...hol élsz Te” | Hungary | series program (m2) | Yes | |
| 2006–2008 | „Vigyázz, kész, rajt!” | Hungary | portrait series show | Yes | |
| 2007 | Akik a lángot őrzik | Hungary | documentary film reports | | cinematographer |

== Advertising films ==
| Year | Title / customer |
|---|---|
| 2022 | Veil – Short of the forest, beyond the city (Fátyol - Erdőn innen, városon túl) - fictive documentary about Fátyol Csővárberki, the dog mascot of the “One with Nature” World of Hunting and Nature Exhibition |
| 2022 | Nordart - Egy megbízható barát - country image film |
| 2020 | Igazság, erő, felemelkedés - együtt tesszük naggyá a Kárpát-medencét! - country image film |
| 2019 | Festival Academy Budapest image film |
| 2018 | Reptéri történetek (Airport stories) miniseries (Budapest Airport) |
| 2016 | Bartók World Competition & Festival image spot (Liszt Ferenc Academy of Music) |
| 2016 | Pázmány, a Te egyetemed! image film (Pázmány Péter Catholic University) |
| 2015 | "Lisztery; Music Here Lives" image film (Liszt Ferenc Academy of Music) |
| 2013 | ’Liszt Ferenc Academy of Music’ 22 October st 2013 opening ceremony short films |
| 2013 | ’Garage Store Árkád Szeged’ |
| 2012 | ’EuroGames’ |
| 2012 | ’Cora’ |
| 2012 | ’Online Resorts’ |
| 2011 | ’Egis, Jovital Vitamin C’ with Kati Wolf |
| 2011 | ’Online Resorts’ viral advertising |
| 2011 | ’Btel’ viral advertising |
| 2011 | ’Shaolin Kung-Fu’ (Kung Fu Academy) |
| 2011 | ’Vodafone Sztárvadász!’ |
| 2010 | ’Ötkert club’ viral advertising |
| 2010 | ’T-Home’ viral advertising |
| 2010 | ’Egis Pharmaceuticals PLC, Jovital Vitamin C’ |
| 2009 | ’Budapest Fantom’ (Metropolitan Public Domain Maintenance Private Company Limited by Shares) ReVISION advertising agency |
| 2009 | ’Provident’ Lowe GGK, campaign film |
| 2009-? | ’Másképp, mint mások’ AXA web series (cinematographer) |
| 2008 | ’Bringázz inkább Te is!’ (Bike prefer you too!) viral advertising ReVISION advertising agency |
| 2008 | ’Easy Hotel’ viral advertising ReVISION advertising agency |
| 2008 | ’Memolife’ ReVISION advertising agency |

== Awards and honors ==
- 2024 Have a Nice Apocalypse – Arany Blende – best concept (in the best posters category)
- 2023 Have a Nice Apocalypse – Vienna Independent Film Festival 2023 - Best Short Film
- 2023 Have a Nice Apocalypse – Stockholm City Film Festival June 2023 - Best Director Short Film
- 2022 Don't Be Afraid/Sose félj! – Košice International Film Festival 2022/2023 Autumn Edition - Best Music Video
- 2021 Genocide in Pozsonyligetfalu – 1st Monthly Film Festival - Best medium documentary length film, Gemini Edition June 2021
- 2021 Genocide in Pozsonyligetfalu - Hungarian Motion Picture Festival - Hungarian Motion Picture Award best documentary short
- 2021 Ma is meghaltam százszor Kaszkadőrök (I died today too a hundred times Stuntmen's) - Hungarian Motion Picture Festival - nominee of the best documentary feature by the Hungarian Motion Picture Award
- 2020 Genocide in Pozsonyligetfalu – EduFilm Fest December 2020 - best documentary
- 2019 Festival Academy Budapest image film – International Academy of Digital Arts and Sciences (IADAS), London, Lovie Award bronze
- 2018 True Musicians – Indie Fest international film festival in California, Awards of Merit
- 2018 True Musicians – Los Angeles Film Awards September, Best TV Series
- 2018 Hunting Partners – IV. International Nature Film Festival Gödöllő - SZIE Special Prize
- 2017 Bartók World Competition & Festival – image spot – 62nd Red Dot Design Award "Red Dot"
- 2017 Bartók World Competition & Festival – image spot – 8th Cannes Corporate Media & TV Awards: Silver Dolphin
- 2017 Bartók World Competition & Festival – image spot – 53rd Chicago International Film Festival: Silver Hugo
- 2015 A csepeli kettős gyilkosság – 4th Proofreading Media Conference, Camera Award, portrait-document category shared third place
- 2015 Liszt Ferenc Academy of Music Lisztery; Music Here Lives" image film – 60th Red Dot Design Award "Red Dot"
- 2015 The Winner – Odense International Film Festival Best OFF15 selection
- 2015 Liszt Ferenc Academy of Music Lisztery; Music Here Lives" image film - 51. Chicago International Film Festival: Silver Hugo
- 2008 Hangár – 15. National Student Film Festival: Special Prize
- 2008 Hangár – Tallinn The 6th International Festival of Non-professional Film Makers: Special Prize
- 2007 Hangár – Pécs "Szemlétek" Audi Vision's Film and Arts Meeting: audience Award
- 2005 "Szekszárdi Örökség" – Szekszárd II. Digi24 Short Film Festival: 2nd place
- 2003 "Falu Skizo" – Faludi Ferenc Academy: Best Short Film
- 2002 "Részegségek és tobzódások" – Faludi Ferenc Academy: Best Short Film
