= András Hajós =

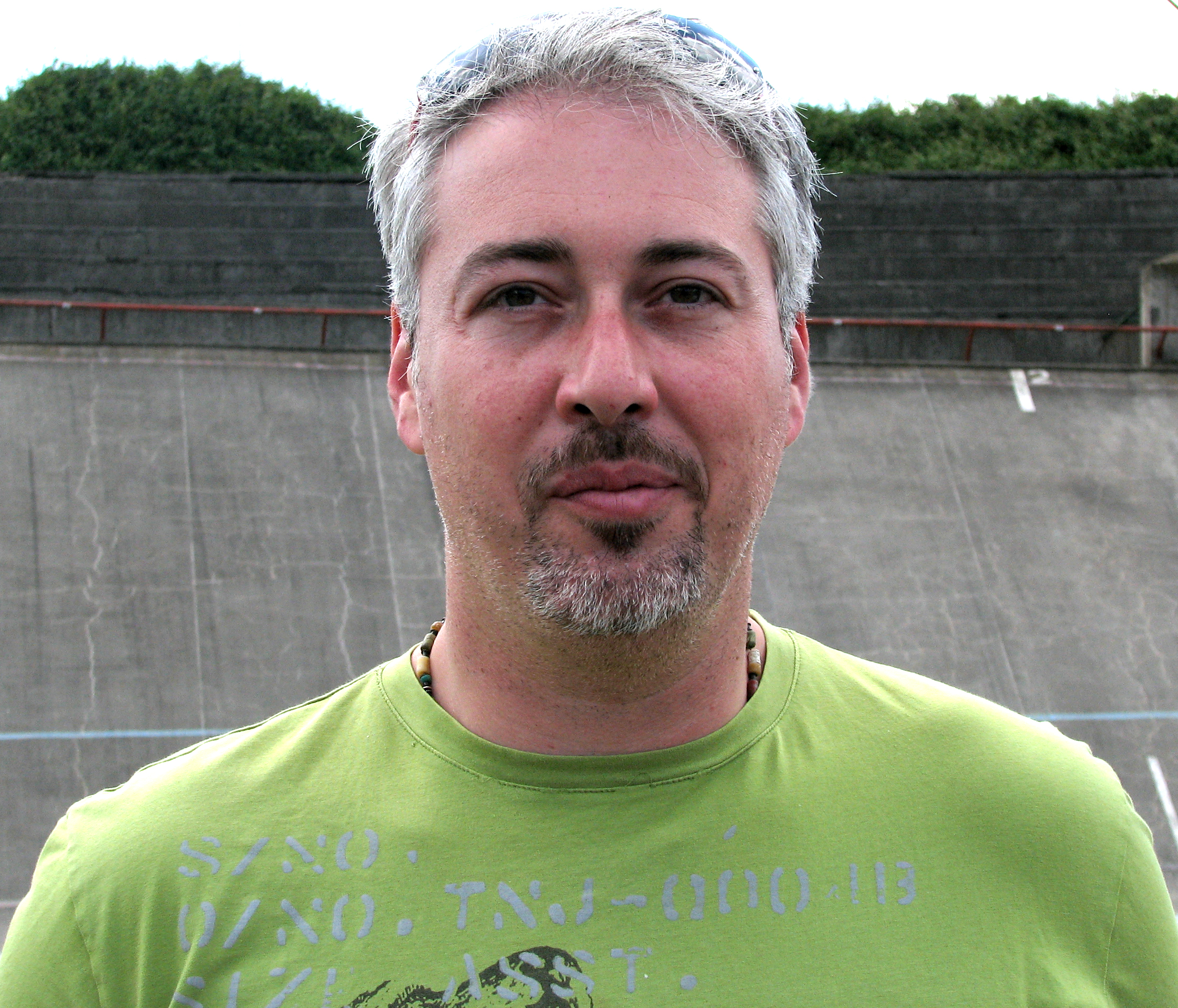
- Born: 3 May 1969 (age 57); Budapest, Hungary
- Occupations: sociologist, singer, composer, comedian
- Years active: 1993–present

András Hajós (born 3 May 1969, Budapest) is a Hungarian sociologist, singer, songwriter, comedian. In 2009 he was awarded the Déri János Prize.

== Biography ==
Born in 1969, he graduated from Madách Imre Gimnázium in Budapest in 1987, after which he attempted the admission test to law school several times, not reaching the cutoff score. However, he did not want to embarrass his brain researcher father by not getting a university degree, so he enrolled in sociology and graduated in 1998. He then worked on a number of jobs: former waiter, manager, press secretary at the town hall, founded a jazz band in 1993 and commercial television channels since 2003.

According to his own admission, his scientific knowledge was not too high and he expressed his strong feeling of dislike towards the way chemistry used to be taught, when he spoke of potassium sulphate in an episode of RTL Klub's Weekly Seven (Heti Hetes) comedy panel show, on 23 December 2007.

== Career ==
=== Musician career ===
The frontman of the band Emil.RuleZ!, founded in 1993. Its unique style and brand of humor earned a large fan base for the band. So far, they released four records: Zazie az ágyban, Hisztis, Zanga!zanga, and Gyere át!, as well as two of their singles Hello, tourist! and Ebola Cola.

=== Film and television career ===
His own talk show "Magánszám" ("Solo Act") was launched in the spring of 2003, first aired on TV2 and after a break, on Viasat 3 as Late Night with András Hajós also known as KEHA. Since the cancellation of the show, Hajós was one of the panellists on "Heti Hetes", a weekly TV show on RTL Klub. In 2005, he hosted 9 episodes of the tv show "Benne leszek a tv-ben".

His movie appearances began with Kelj fel, komám! (Get Up, mate!), released in 2002. Since then, he has had a part in Happy Birthday! (2003), Magyar vándor (2004), Zsiguli (2004), Virgo (2006). In 2007, in Koltai's comedy Megy a gőzös (Train keeps arollin') he played the part of the gullible blind.

=== Dr. Debreceni László ===
András Hajós's best friend, companion and co-host of his shows, Magánszám and KEHA. The teddy bear used to belong to Gaál Csaba Boogie, a fellow student in Hajós' high school who named the future media star toy when he hasn't even turned 2. Apart from the name, the soft toy associated with András Hajós has no connection to the chief medical officer of ÁNTSZ.

Since 2018, he has been hosting the culinary show The Great Bake Off Hungary, the Hungarian version of Great British Bake Off.

== Political views ==
He defined himself as a liberal democrat, a Euro-Hungarian father of two (he has since had another child). For a long time, he had shared ideological alignment with Alliance of Free Democrats. Prior to his career in television and music, he worked for years in the press department of the Lord Mayor's Office, at some point as the speech writer for Gábor Demszky.

On 22 September 2006 in a news segment on Hír TV, he called for Prime Minister Ferenc Gyurcsány’s resignation, following the 2006 political unrest. RTL Klub censured his actions however, due to lack of contractual agreement, he did not suffer any repercussions legal or otherwise and remained a core panelist of the weekly current affairs program Heti Hetes (until 2013 when he joined TV2).
