= Just Sex and Nothing Else =

Just Sex
- Directed by: Krisztina Goda
- Starring: Judit Schell; Kata Dobó; Sándor Csányi
- Release date: 8 December 2005
- Running time: 97 minutes
- Country: Hungary
- Language: Hungarian

Just Sex and Nothing Else (Hungarian: Csak szex és más semmi) is a 2005 Hungarian comedy film directed by Krisztina Goda.

== Cast ==
- Judit Schell - Dóra
- Kata Dobó - Zsófi
- Sándor Csányi - Tamás
- Károly Gesztesi - Paskó
- Adél Jordán - Saci
- Zoltán Seress - Péter
- Zoltán Rátóti - András

== Reception ==
A review in Time Out stated gave the film 2 stars out of 5. The film, a popular comedy, ranks among the greatest Hungarian box office successes of the time.
