= Emil.RuleZ! =

Hungarian pop and alternative jazz band

Emil.RuleZ! is a Hungarian pop and alternative jazz band. Much of their music includes a light-hearted comedic component.

The group's 2001 debut album Zazie az ágyban received a gold certification from the Association of Hungarian Record Companies in 2004. The group is probably best known among English and German speakers for their 2002 single "Hello.tourist!"

== Members ==
- Gyula "Jules" Verasztó: percussion
- András "Winkler" Hajós: lead vocals, keyboards, guitar
- György "Eldée" Hegyi: bass guitar, guitar, vocals

== Discography ==
=== Albums and singles ===
- Zazie az ágyban (album, 2001)
- Hello.tourist! (single, 2002)
- Hisztis (album, 2003)
- zanga!zanga (album, 2005)
- Ebola Cola (Just Online, 2008)
- Gyere át! (album, 2012)

=== Film soundtracks ===
- Boldog Születésnapot! soundtrack (song "Zsebeibe zsé"; 2003)
- Magyar vándor soundtrack (song "Karaván"; 2004)

== See also ==
- Hungarian pop
