= The Winner (2014 film) =

- A győztes
- Directed by: Dávid Géczy
- Written by: Dávid Géczy, Pál Laska
- Screenplay by: Pál Laska, Dániel Farkas, Dávid Géczy
- Based on: novel Szép magyar szótár by Szilárd Podmaniczky
- Produced by: Janovics Zoltán; Skrabski Fruzsina
- Cinematography: Dániel Farkas (‘A’ camera); Róbert Ádok (‘B’ camera); Bálint Seres (diving photography)
- Edited by: Attila Lecza
- Music by: Márton Vojnits
- Distributed by: Becsengetünk Produkció
- Release dates: 23 September 2014 (HU (Cinema City MOM Park)); 30 August 2014 (HU (M1 (Hungarian TV channel)))
- Running time: 20 minutes
- Country: Hungary
- Languages: Hungarian, English subtitled
- Budget: HUF 10 000 000 (estimated)

The Winner (Hungarian: A győztes) is a 2014 Hungarian short film directed by Dávid Géczy, starring Andor Lukáts and Iván Kamarás. The film is supported by Media Council Film and Media Funding Scheme.

== Plot ==
It is a short fiction movie about an old swimming coach, István Kovács (Andor Lukáts), who won a gold medal at the 1980 Olympics in Moscow in swimming.

He gets a life-changing medical diagnosis. As a result, he has to abstain from any physical activity. By now all his fame and honour has faded, and he's stuck coaching undisciplined, useless children who'd never understand what it means to strive for something and achieve it. Every day he races against the younger version of himself (Iván Kamarás), unable to come to terms with his present circumstances. He decides to swim his top score from back at the Olympics. But this battle defeats him.

The film focuses on the question "is a winner really a winner?"

== Cast ==
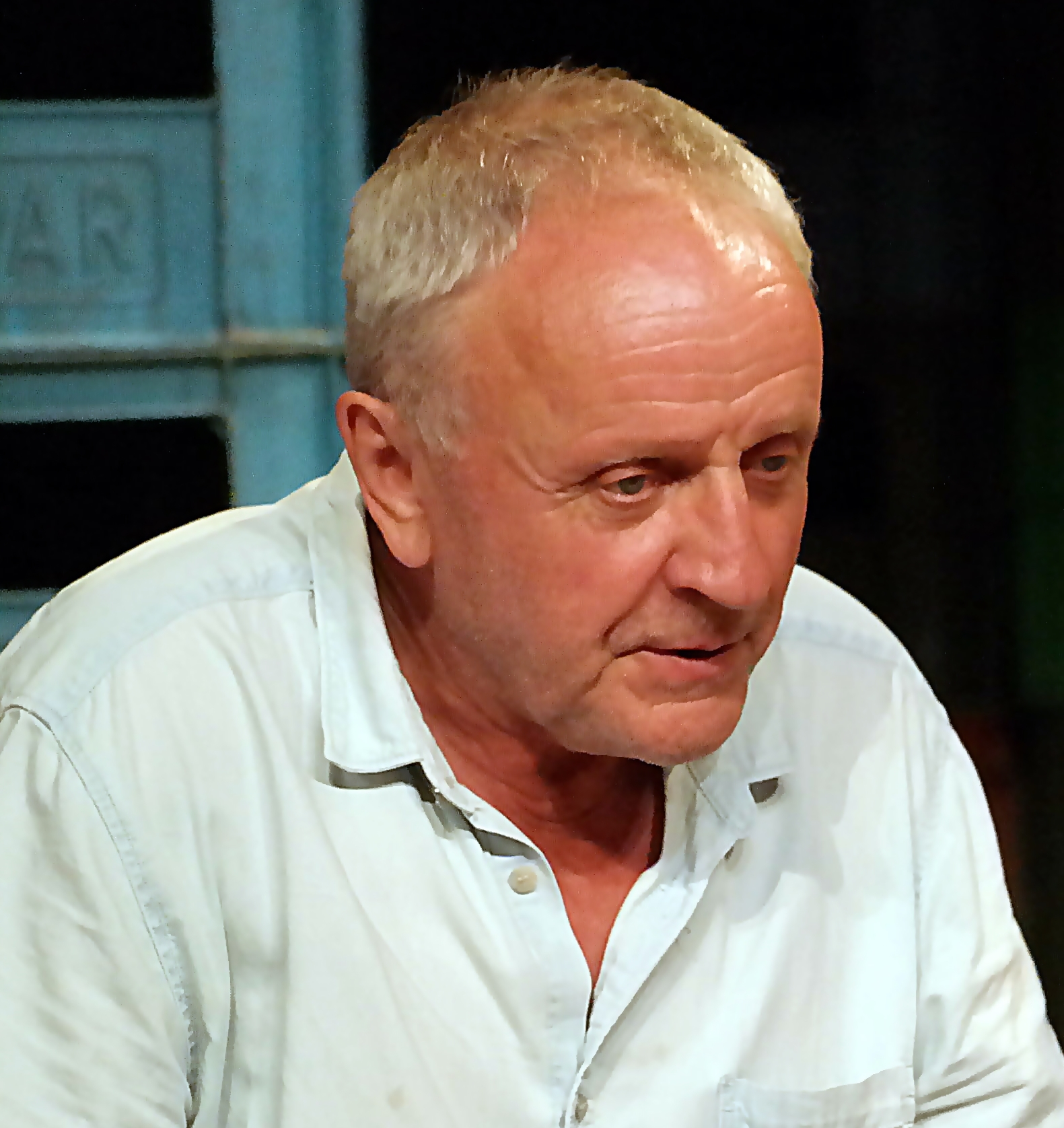
Andor Lukáts

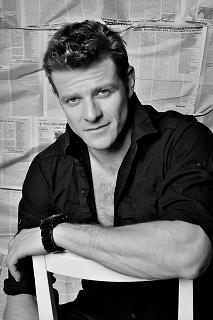
Iván Kamarás

- Andor Lukáts (old swimming coach and former Olympic swimming winner in 2014)
- Iván Kamarás (the young Olympic swimming winner in 1980)
- Eszter Földes (his wife)
- Simon Szemző (Simon, child)
- Tamás Racsek (Tomi, child)
- Máté Veczel (Máté, child)
- Adam Lux (doctor)
- Gergő Mikola (Ivan Popov, russian swimmer)
- Askar Shalov (Mongolian Swimmer)
- László Zinner (politician)

== Premiere and festival screenings ==
- TV premiere: M1 (Hungarian TV channel) - 30 August 2014
- Budapest premiere: Cinema City MOM Park - 23 September 2014
- Hungarian Film Week - October 2014
- 25. MEDIAWAVE Festival - April 2015
- International premiere: Odense International Film Festival (OFF15) - August 2015
- 11. Busho International Short Film Festival - September 2015
- 31. Interfilm - Berlin International Short Film Festival - November 2015.
- 13. Bogotá Short Film Festival - Bogoshorts, Colombia - December 2015
- 12. Akbank Short Film Festival, Turkey - Istanbul - March 2016
