= Kata Dobó =

Hungarian actress (born 1974)

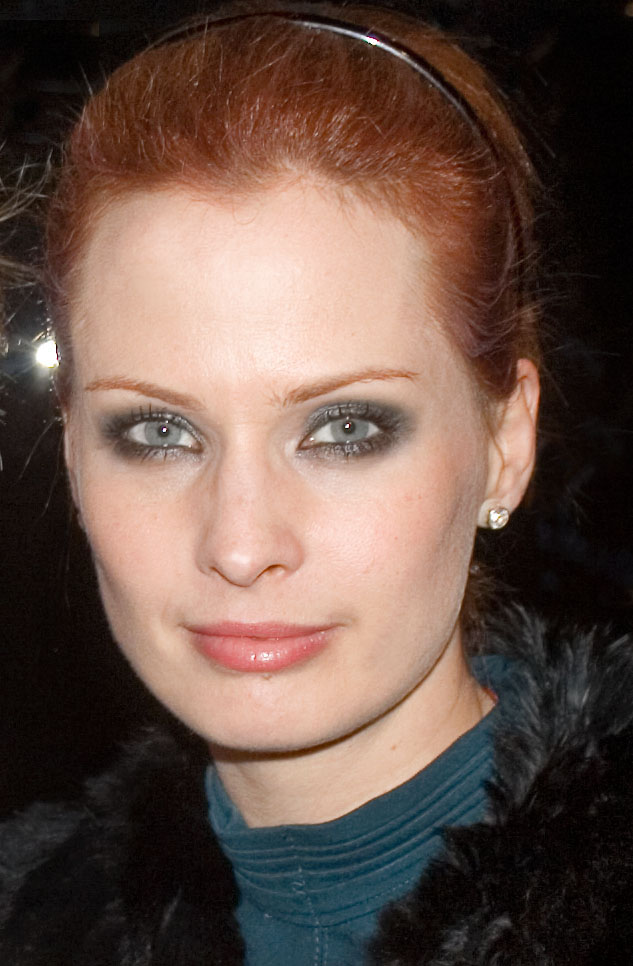
- Dobó in 2011
- Born: Katalin Kovács; 25 February 1974 (age 52); Budapest, Hungary
- Occupations: Actress; filmmaker
- Years active: 1995–present
- Spouse: Dávid Vermes (m. 1997; div. 1998)

Kata Dobó or Kata Dobo (born Katalin Kovács, Hungarian: Kovács Katalin, Dobó Kata, on 25 February 1974) is a Hungarian actress and filmmaker.

== Biography ==
Kata Dobó was born on 25 February 1974 in Budapest, Hungary and moved to Los Angeles, USA in 1999 to her partner of the time, film producer Andrew G. Vajna. She left the US after they split and was residing in Budapest, Hungary in 2011.

Her films include A miniszter félrelép (1997) and Európa expressz (1999).

Recent television work includes an appearance on Lady Heather's Box, an episode of CSI: Crime Scene Investigation, in 2003. In January 2011, she appeared in Bloodlines, the fourth episode in the 14th series of the BBC crime drama Silent Witness, along with fellow Hungarian actors Iván Kamarás and Lili Bordán.

== Personal life ==
In 2016 she and Levente Gulyás divorced. They had a daughter.

== Selected filmography ==
=== As actress ===
- Európa expressz (1999)
- 15 Minutes (2001)
- An American Rhapsody (2001)
- Rollerball (2002)
- CSI:Crime Scene Investigation (TV Series) (2003)
- Detention (2003)
- Out For A Kill (2003)
- Csak szex és más semmi (2005)
- Basic Instinct 2 (2006)
- Szabadság, szerelem (2006)
- Blood and Chocolate (2007)
