= Dream Well =

Dream Well may refer to:

- Dream Well (film), a 2009 Hungarian romantic comedy film
- Dream Well (horse) (foaled 1995), a Thoroughbred racehorse
