= Európa expressz =

Európa Expressz
- Directed by: Horváth Csaba
- Written by: Dóra György; Csaba Horváth
- Starring: Kata Dobó; Iván Kamarás; Zoltán Rátóti; András Stohl
- Cinematography: Miklós Gurbán
- Edited by: Beáta Eszlári
- Music by: Gyula Dobos
- Release date: March 18, 1999 (Hungary)
- Running time: 97 mins
- Language: Hungarian/Russian

Európa Expressz (alt. Europa Express) is a Hungarian action-thriller film made in 1999. directed by Csaba Horváth and written by Ákos Barnóczky, György Dora, and Csaba Horváth.

== Plot ==
Zavarov, a psychotic Ukrainian thief who likes to steal religious icons, is on the run from a group of undercover cops who don't know Zavarov has planted an informant amongst them. Zavarov makes his getaway on a train, only to discover the police were able to board before leaving the station. He hijacks the train and demands passage to Austria. The police cleverly run the train in a loop and mask a Hungarian train station as if it were in Nickelsdorf, Austria (the actual station filmed is in Szabadbattyán). This fools Zavarov into thinking he is in Austria, and when he exits the train, the police surround him.

== Cast ==
- András Stohl - Béci
- Kata Dobó - Edit
- Iván Kamarás - Jimmy
- Tibor Szilágyi - Lieutenant Colonel Papp
- Zoltán Rátóti - Zavarov
- László Jászai Jr. - Golyó
- András Gáspár - Kenõ
- Géza Kaszás - Second in Command
- Ödön Rubold - Ticket inspector
- András Schlanger - Jenõke
- Ádám Rajhona - Civilian
- Péter Végh - Hadházy
- Dorka Gryllus - Student

== Awards ==
- Nominations for a Golden Slate in the 2000 Csapnivaló Awards for Best Hungarian Actor (Zoltán Rátóti) and Best Hungarian Actress (Kata Dobó).
