= András Gáspár =

András Gáspár may refer to:

- András Gáspár (actor) (born 1970), Hungarian voice actor, actor, editor, and presenter
- András Gáspár (general) (1804–1884), Hungarian general and politician
