= List of Hungarian film directors =

This is a list of notable film and television directors from Hungary.

The names are given in Western name order and sorted alphabetically by family name.

For an alphabetical list of articles on Hungarian actors see Category:Hungarian film directors.

== A ==
- Nimród Antal

== B ==
- Péter Bacsó
- Béla Balogh
- László Benedek
- Gábor Bódy
- Géza von Bolváry
- Zoltán Bonta
- István Bujtor

== C ==
- Ferenc Cakó
- Michael Curtiz
- Géza von Cziffra

== D ==
- Attila Dargay
- Alfréd Deésy

== E ==
- Judit Elek
- Ildikó Enyedi

== F ==
- Zoltán Fábri
- Nicolas Farkas
- György Fehér
- Paul Fejos
- Benedek Fliegauf
- Gábor N. Forgács
- Péter Forgács

== G ==
- István Gaál
- Péter Gothár
- Lívia Gyarmathy
- Imre Gyöngyössy

== H ==
- Martin Helstáb
- János Herskó
- Zoltán Huszárik

== J ==
- Miklós Jancsó
- Marcell Jankovics
- Jenő Janovics

== K ==
- Barna Kabay
- Ferenc Kardos
- Márton Keleti
- Zsolt Kézdi-Kovács
- Ilona Kolonits
- Róbert Koltai
- Alexander Korda
- Ferenc Kósa

== M ==
- Gyula Maár
- Károly Makk
- Félix Máriássy
- Peter Medak
- Márta Mészáros

== P ==
- György Pálfi

== R ==
- Géza von Radványi
- László Ranódy
- Sándor Reisenbüchler

== S ==
- Pál Sándor
- Sándor Sára
- István Szabó
- Zoltan Szalkai
- János Szász
- István Székely

== T ==
- Béla Tarr
- Ferenc Török
- Ivan Tors

== V ==
- Péter Vácz

== See also ==
- List of film directors by name
