= List of Hungarian film producers =

This is a list of notable film and television producers from Hungary.

== G ==
- György Gát
- Gábor N. Forgács

== K ==
- Zoltán Kamondi
- Ferenc Kardos
- Alexander Korda

== M ==
- Károly Makk

== O ==
- Andrea Osvárt

== P ==
- Gabriel Pascal

== S ==
- Endre Sík
- Sándor Simó
