= Judit Schell =

Hungarian actress

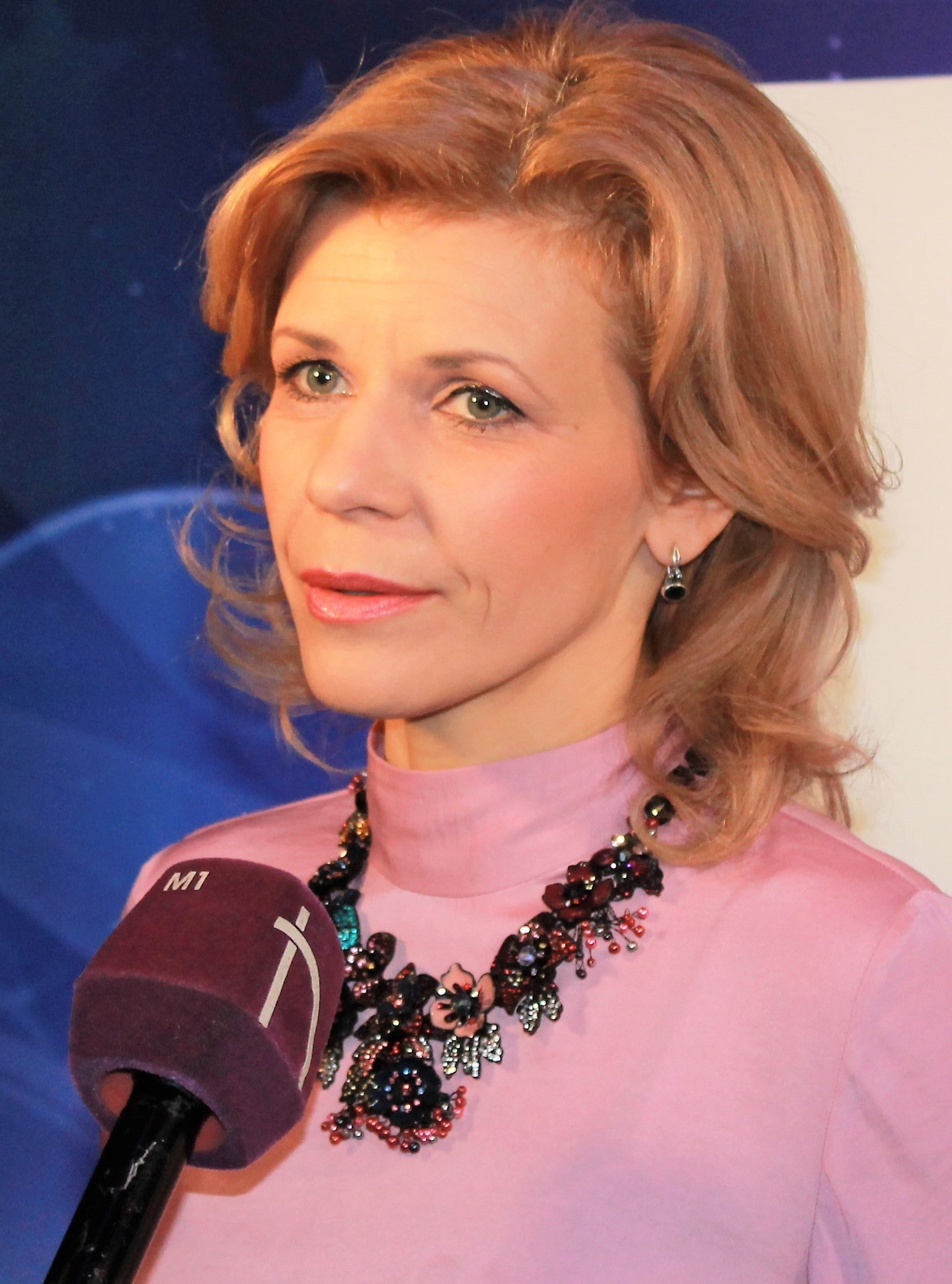
- Schell during the announcement of the artists for A Dal 2018
- Born: 16 April 1973 (age 53); Debrecen, Hungary
- Occupation: Actress
- Years active: 1994–present
- Children: 3

Judit Schell (born 16 April 1973) is a Hungarian actress.

== Career ==
She graduated from the Academy of Drama and Film in Budapest in 1995. After graduating, she began her career as an actress at the Radnóti Miklós Theater, where she spent 8 years. She joined the National Theatre in 2003. She has been a member of the Thália Theatre since 2012.

She was a judge in A Dal 2018, the 2018 edition of the selection process in Hungary for the Eurovision Song Contest 2018, in Lisbon, Portugal.

== Personal life ==
She was married to Zoltán Schmied. They have a daughter, Borbála and a son, Boldizsár. Judit also has a son, László from a previous relationship.

== Filmography ==
Year	Title	Role	Director
2023	White Plastic Sky	Dr. Madu	Tibor Bánóczki, Sarolta Szabó
2007	The End	Ági	Gábor Rohonyi
2005	Just Sex and Nothing Else	Dóra	Krisztina Goda
2005	Fateless	Anya	Lajos Koltai
1996–1999	Szomszédok	Gabi Mátrai	Ádám Horváth

== Theatre roles ==
The number of performances total to 53.

Play	Role	Theatre	Date
Richard III	Lady Anna	National Theatre	4 November 2004
Timon of Athens		Radnóti Miklós Theatre	
The Cripple of Inishmaan	Eileen Osbourne	Radnóti Miklós Theatre	19 October 2001
Life Is a Dream	Estrella	National Theatre	13 October 2005
Boldogtalanok	Róza Gyarmaky	National Theatre	25 October 2005
Three Sisters	Olga	Radnóti Miklós Theatre	20 October 2002
Three Sisters	Masha	National Theatre	24 September 2010
Marriage	Agafya Tikhonovna	Radnóti Miklós Theatre	27 November 1994
Mirandolina	Mirandolina	Radnóti Miklós Theatre	14 May 2000
The Devils		National Theatre	29 October 2007
Uncle Vanya	Sofya Serebryakova	Radnóti Miklós Theatre	26 October 1996

== Syncing roles ==
- The Practice: Lindsay Dole – Kelli Williams
- Stargate: Samantha Carter – Amanda Tapping (2 seasons)
- Rescue Me: Laura Miles – Diane Farr
- Earth 2: Dr. Julia Heller – Jessica Steen
- Girls in Love: Anna – Sam Loggin
- Valkyrie: Nina Schenk Gräfin von Stauffenberg
- The Return of Casanova (2015) – Contributory

== CDs and audio books ==
- Magyarország kedvenc gyermekmeséi + dalok – Válogatott örökzöldek

== Awards ==
- Critics' Award (1998)
- Jászai Mari Award (2000)
- POSZT – Best supporting actress (2002)
- POSZT – Best actress under the age of 30 (2002)
- Critics' Award for Best Supporting Actress (2003)
- Hungarian Film Critics' Award (2006)
- Súgó Csiga Award (2006)
- Monte-Carlo, Best Actress Award for Just Sex and Nothing Else (2006)
- Order of Merit of the Republic of Hungary (2007)
- Hungary's Worthy Artist Award (2017)

== Sources ==
- Judit Schell's website

== Other information ==
- Schell at the Thália Theatre's website
- Magyar szinkron
