= Kalandorok =

- Directed by: Béla Paczolay
- Written by: Béla Paczolay; Gergely Péterfy
- Starring: Péter Haumann; Péter Rudolf; Milán Schruff; Ágnes Bánfalvy; Béla Barabás; Péter Bergendy; Dezso Csiki; Mari Csomós; Áron Dimény; Zoltán Durkó
- Distributed by: Unio Film Filmpartners
- Release date: January 24, 2008
- Running time: 100 minutes
- Country: Hungary
- Language: Hungarian

Kalandorok ("Adventurers") is a 2008 Hungarian film directed by Béla Paczolay. A retired teacher, his son and his grandson take a road trip to Budapest.

== Cast ==
- Péter Haumann as Grandpa
- Péter Rudolf as Géza
- Milán Schruff as Andris
- Ágnes Bánfalvy as Widow
