= Ágnes Bánfalvy =

Hungarian actress (born 1954)

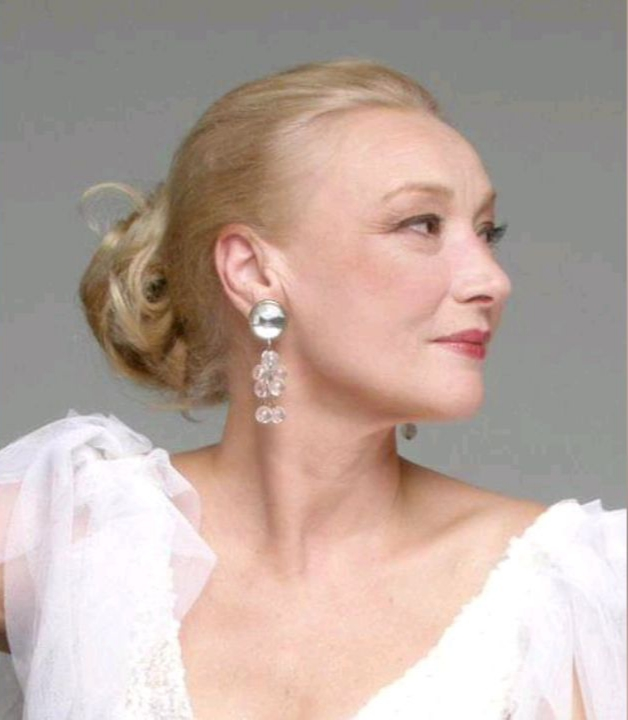
- Born: 30 April 1954 (age 72); Budapest, Hungary
- Occupation: Actress
- Years active: 1975–present
- Spouse(s): Attila Bokor (divorced); Csaba Horváth

Ágnes Bánfalvy (born 30 April 1954) is a Hungarian actress. She came to notice playing Little Red Riding Hood when she was 24. She has appeared in more than fifty films since 1975.

== Selected filmography ==
Film
Year	Title	Role	Notes
1981	Temporary Paradise		
1981	Mephisto		
2001	An American Rhapsody	Helen	Credited as Ági Bánfalvy
2008	Kalandorok		
2009	Álom.net		
