= An American Rhapsody =

2001 film by Éva Gárdos

- Theatrical release poster
- Directed by: Éva Gárdos
- Written by: Éva Gárdos
- Produced by: Colleen Camp; Bonnie Timmermann
- Starring: Nastassja Kinski; Scarlett Johansson; Tony Goldwyn; Mae Whitman; Ági Bánfalvy; Zoltán Seress; Zsuzsa Czinkóczi; Balázs Galkó; Larisa Oleynik; Lisa Jane Persky; Colleen Camp; Emmy Rossum; Éva Soreny; Kata Dobó
- Cinematography: Elemér Ragályi
- Edited by: Margaret Goodspeed
- Music by: Cliff Eidelman
- Production companies: Fireworks Entertainment; Seven Arts Pictures
- Distributed by: Paramount Classics
- Release dates: June 20, 2001 (Nantucket); August 24, 2001 (United States); February 28, 2002 (Hungary)
- Running time: 106 minutes
- Countries: United States; Hungary
- Languages: English; Hungarian
- Box office: $970,676

An American Rhapsody (Hungarian: Amerikai rapszódia) is a 2001 biographical drama film written and directed by Éva Gárdos. Based on Gárdos' life story, the film tells the story of a 15-year-old girl from a Hungarian-American family. It stars Nastassja Kinski, Scarlett Johansson, Tony Goldwyn, and Mae Whitman.

== Plot ==
In the summer of 1965, at age fifteen, Suzanne "Zsuzsi" Sandor describes her life as "falling apart." Rebellious, unsure of her true identity, she determines to return to Budapest where it all began. She recalls her father's fears that everyone he knew were either jailed or executed under Mátyás Rákosi's communist rule.

In 1950, Zsuzsi's parents, Peter and Margit, flee the oppressive Hungarian People's Republic, planning to start a publishing company in America. As defecting with children is difficult, they only bring their eldest daughter Maria, entrusting baby Zsuzsi to Margit's mother Helen. Peter's friend George has hired a woman to bring Zsuzsi across the border to Vienna, but when she arrives to pick up the infant, Helen fears she may easily kill or abandon it and refuses. The next day, just before Helen is arrested by the secret police coming for the fugitives, George takes Zsuzsi to his mother's countryside home to be raised by a kindly foster couple, Jeno and Teri. Margit is enraged at Peter's failed plan, but with funds low, they are forced to sail from France to America.

Three years later: Teri expresses reluctance at returning Zsuzsi. In Los Angeles, Margit waitresses at Mr. Woods' café, and Peter manufactures aircraft. Meanwhile, Helen toils at a Hungarian prison camp. For two more years, Margit writes to Dag Hammarskjöld, the Secretary-General of the United Nations, John Singer at the American Red Cross, Vice President Nixon, Senator Barry Goldwater, and even Nikita Khrushchev, to bring Zsuzsi to their new home. Dottie and Patti welcome Margit to the neighborhood, admiring her reply letter from Eleanor Roosevelt.

1955: Zsuzsi celebrates her fifth birthday. With limited reforms after Stalin's death, Helen is released from prison. She and George pick up Zsuzsi from Jeno and Teri, pretending it's for a visit to Budapest. They put her on a flight via London to L.A. where the press covers her arrival for television news. Later, Zsuzsi wanders away to the playground; returning, she cannot find her house. A neighbor woman walks her home, having recognized her from the news.

Her sister Maria, suddenly not an only child anymore, doesn't like Zsuzsi's presence. Margit tries to tell Zsuzsi that Teri was not her "mama," but Zsuzsi is homesick, keeping her belongings in her suitcase. After she runs off again, Peter offers her a deal: when she is older, he will buy her a ticket to Hungary, if she still wants to go, but first she must try to adjust.

Presently: With Sheila, teenaged Suzanne sneaks out to park, neck, and drink with her older boyfriend Paul. Margit forcibly pulls her back home. Now eighteen, Maria tries to advise Suzanne, but Maria admits she wants to marry and escape their parents. Peter must travel to Dallas for work. Suzanne stays out all night with Paul. At Margit's admonishment, Susanne shouts, "I hate you!" Margit installs bars over Suzanne's bedroom window, and a lock outside her door – "I won't let you ruin your life." Paul knocks on Suzanne's window; Margit threatens to call the police. Suzanne starts shouting "Mom, open the door!" but Margit puts on the vacuum to drown her out. Suzanne loads and fires the rifle she just found while looking for her old suitcase. Arriving home, Peter hears shots fired and confronts Suzanne, who apologizes the next morning. She declares she must go to Budapest. Margit protests, "in Hungary, people disappear for saying the wrong word? And you shoot up your room!" Suzanne reminds Peter of his promise.

Zsuzsi reunites at Jeno's and Teri's new Budapest flat, since "a government big shot" commandeered their village home. First-hand, she witnesses the terrible conditions in communist Hungary. Suzanne tells her grandmother Helen about Paul, lamenting how she makes everyone unhappy. Asked why Margit hated Budapest, Helen explains, drunken Russian soldiers wanted young Margit, and killed her father for intervening. Margit vowed to leave for a better world for her children. Zsuzsi tells Jeno and Terri, "I love you," but "this is no longer my home." Helen's mansion now houses "ten or twelve" different families. Helen also recounts her prison years. Suzanne asks, "What do I do?" Helen replies that she already knows, and "We all made mistakes out of love."

Epilogue: Suzanne returns to L.A. where Margit says she is proud of her "brave girl." Suzanne counters, "You're brave....Hi mom."

== Cast ==
- Nastassja Kinski as Margit Sandor
- Scarlett Johansson as Suzanne (Zsuzsi) Sandor (age 15)
  - Kelly Endrész Banlaki as Suzanne (age 5–6)
  - Raffaella Bánsági as Suzanne (infant)
- Tony Goldwyn as Peter Sandor
- Mae Whitman as Maria Sandor (age 10)
  - Larisa Oleynik as Maria Sandor (age 18)
- Ági Bánfalvy as Helen
- Zoltán Seress as George (Gyuri)
- Zsuzsa Czinkóczi as Teri
- Balázs Galkó as Jeno
- Lisa Jane Persky as Patti
- Colleen Camp as Dottie
- Emmy Rossum as Sheila (age 15)
- Éva Soreny as Eva
- Kata Dobó as Claire
- Jacqueline Steiger as Betty

== Reception ==
An American Rhapsody received mixed reviews, currently holding a 51/100 rating on Metacritic based on 22 critics, indicating "mixed or average" reviews. Rotten Tomatoes gives the film a 56% approval rating based on 61 reviews, with an average rating of 5.61/10. The website's critics consensus reads, "Though obviously a labor of love, American Rhapsody is an uneven, heavy-handed effort, particularly in the second half".
