= The End (2007 Hungarian film) =

- Directed by: Gábor Rohonyi
- Starring: Emil Keres; Teri Földi
- Release date: 11 January 2007
- Running time: 1h 44min
- Country: Hungary
- Language: Hungarian

The End (Hungarian: Konyec - Az utolsó csekk a pohárban) is a 2007 Hungarian comedy film directed by Gábor Rohonyi.

== Cast ==
- Emil Keres - Emil
- Teri Földi - Hédi
- Judit Schell - Ági
- Zoltán Schmied - Andor
- Đoko Rosić - Juan
