= Children of Glory =

- Hungarian: Szabadság, szerelem
- Directed by: Krisztina Goda
- Written by: Joe Eszterhas; Colin K. Gray (documentary Freedom's Fury)
- Screenplay by: Éva Gárdos; Géza Bereményi; Réka Divinyi
- Produced by: Andrew G. Vajna
- Starring: Kata Dobó; Iván Fenyő; Sándor Csányi; Károly Gesztesi
- Cinematography: Buda Gulyás; János Vecsernyés
- Edited by: Éva Gárdos; Annamaria Szanto
- Music by: Nick Glennie-Smith
- Production company: C2 Pictures
- Distributed by: Intercom
- Release date: 23 October 2006
- Running time: 123 minutes
- Country: Hungary
- Language: Hungarian

Children of Glory (Hungarian: Szabadság, szerelem) is a 2006 film directed by Krisztina Goda. It commemorates Hungary's Revolution of 1956 and the "Blood in the Water" match. Taking place in Budapest and at the Melbourne Olympic Games in October and November of that year, the film takes viewers into the passion and sadness of one of the most dramatic popular revolts of the twentieth century. In the same year Soviet tanks were violently suppressing the Revolution within Hungary, the Hungarian water polo team was winning over Russia in the Olympic pool in Melbourne, in what is sometimes described as the bloodiest water polo match in history. While telling the story of 1956 in part through fictional lead characters, the film-makers simultaneously recreated many of the key public events of the Revolution, including the huge demonstrations and the fighting in the streets of Budapest.

== Plot ==
In 1956, Karcsi Szabó (Iván Fenyő) was a star athlete at the University of Budapest and had been named captain of the national water polo team that would represent Hungary in the Olympics held that summer in Australia. However, many of Szabó's countrymen had more on their minds; Hungary had fallen under the oppressive rule of the Soviet Union, and a growing number of Hungarians were demanding independence. One day, Szabó and his friend Tibi witness a demonstration led by Viki Falk demanding an end to Soviet rule in Hungary.

While initially Szabó is more attracted to Falk's beauty than her message, through his attempts to woo her he is awakened to the need for revolution; however, an uprising by the people is crushed by the Soviet war machine, and matters become worse for the Hungarian people. When Szabó and his teammates discover that Hungary will be competing against the Soviet Union in the men's Water Polo tournament at the upcoming Olympics, they see an opportunity for a symbolic victory over their oppressors, if they will be allowed to leave to country to compete.

== Cast ==
- Kata Dobó as Falk Viki
- Iván Fenyő as Szabó Karcsi
- Sándor Csányi as Vámos Tibi
- Károly Gesztesi as Telki coach
- Ildikó Bánsági as Karcsi's mother
- Tamás Jordán as Karcsi's granddad
- Viktória Szávai as Hanák Eszter
- Zsolt Huszár as Gál Jancsi
- Tamás Keresztes as Ács Imi
- Péter Haumann as Feri bácsi
- Dániel Gábori as Józsika (as Gábori Dániel)
- Róbert Marton as Kardos Márton (Compó)
- Kornél Simon as Abonyi Gyula (Báró)
- Krisztián Kolovratnik as Fazekas Sándor (Frank)
- Antal Czapkó as Prokop

== Reception ==
On the review aggregator website Rotten Tomatoes, the film holds a "fresh" approval rating of 92% based on 12 reviews, with an average score of 6 out of 10.

A review in The Guardian stated "The atmosphere of the time, the demonstrations and the uprising itself are vividly recreated by director Krisztina Goda, and the water-polo match between the Soviet Union and Hungary at the Melbourne Olympics that followed shortly thereafter is excellently staged. It's certainly moving, but the cliche-ridden script and the blatant manipulations show that you can take the boy out of Hollywood, but you can't take Hollywood out of the boy."

The film was a box office success in Hungary.
