= László Jászai =

Hungarian actor (born 1967)

László Jászai (born 25 January 1967, Szeged) is a Hungarian actor.

== Life ==
From 1985 to 1986, he was a student of Mária Gór Nagy, while he was also at the National Theatre from 1985 to 1987, and then, in 1991, he graduated from the Academy of Drama and Film in Budapest. He played in Veszprém, then in Budapest, and, in 1992, became contracted with the National Theatre.

== Filmography ==
- Kisváros
- Hanussen
- Cyrano
- Európa expressz
- Rendőrsztori
- A titkos háború
- Sínjárók
- Világszám!
- A legbátrabb város
- Tűzvonalban
- Fapad

== Awards ==
- Farkas-Ratkó award 1994
- János Rajz award 1995
- Farkas-Ratkó award 2000
- Főnix award 2004
- Ferenc Sík-emlékgyűrű (alapítványi) 2005
- László Mensáros awards 2008

== More information ==
- ifj. Jászai László Magyar Színház, magyarszinhaz.hu (Hozzáférés: 2015. szeptember 14.)
- Biográf ki kicsoda 2002. Kortársaink életrajzi lexikona. Főszerk. Hermann Péter, összeáll., vál. A. Gergely András et al. Bp., Enciklopédia, 2001.
- Révai Új Lexikona. Főszerk. Kollega Tarsoly István. Szekszárd, Babits, 1996-.
- Who is Who Magyarországon. Kiegészítő kötet. 2. kiad. 2004. Zug, Hübners blaues Who is Who, 2004.
