= Relatives (2006 film) =

2006 film

- Directed by: István Szabó
- Written by: Zsigmond Móricz (novel); Andrea Vészits; István Szabó
- Produced by: János Rózsa
- Starring: Sándor Csányi
- Cinematography: Lajos Koltai
- Release date: 9 February 2006
- Running time: 110 minutes
- Country: Hungary
- Language: Hungarian

Relatives (Hungarian: Rokonok) is a 2006 Hungarian drama film directed by István Szabó. It was entered into the 28th Moscow International Film Festival.

== Cast ==
- Sándor Csányi as István Kopjáss
- Ildikó Tóth as Lina Szentkálnay
- Károly Eperjes as Soma Kardics
- Erika Marozsán as Magdaléna Szentkálnay
- Oleg Tabakov as Mayor
- Tibor Szilágyi as Mayor (voice)
- Ferenc Kállai as Uncle Berci
- Piroska Molnár as Auntie Kati
- József Madaras as Beggar Man
- Csaba Pindroch as Imri Keék
- Eliza Sodró as Julis
