= Piroska Molnár =

Hungarian actress (born 1945)

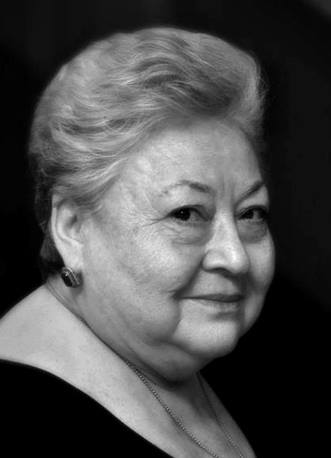
- Born: 1 October 1945 (age 81); Ózd, Hungary
- Education: University of Theatre and Film Arts – Budapest
- Occupation: Actress
- Years active: 1966–present
- Awards: Jászai Mari Award –1977; Merited Artist of the Republic of Hungary –1981; Excellent Artist of the Republic of Hungary –1990; Kossuth Prize –1995; Hungarian Order of Merit Officer's Cross –2006; Actress of the Nation –2011

Piroska Molnár (born 1 October 1945) is a Hungarian actress. She has appeared in more than one hundred films since 1967.

== Selected filmography ==
Year	Title	Role	Notes
1976	Árvácska	Anna	
1976	Man Without a Name		
1996	Samba	Klári	
1997	Gypsy Lore	Máli	
1997	Dollybirds	Aranka	
2006	Taxidermia	Hadnagyné	
2006	Relatives	Auntie Kati	
2011	The Tragedy of Man	The Spirit of Earth	voice only
2013	The Notebook	Grandmother	
2014	Free Fall		
2015	Liza, the Fox-Fairy	Marta	
2015	Home Guards		

== Theatre ==
Title	Role
War and Peace	Natasha
The Threepenny Opera	Polly
Romeo and Juliet	The Nurse
Richard III	Duchess of York
The Seagull	Nina, Arkadina
A Csárdáskirálynő (Die Csárdásfürstin)	Cecily
Les Femmes savantes (The Learned Ladies)	Philaminte
The Crucible	Rebecca Nurse
Peer Gynt	Aase
The Count of Luxembourg	Fleury
Cats' Play	Giza
Intrigue and Love	Miller's wife
