= Károly Gesztesi =

Hungarian actor (1963–2020)

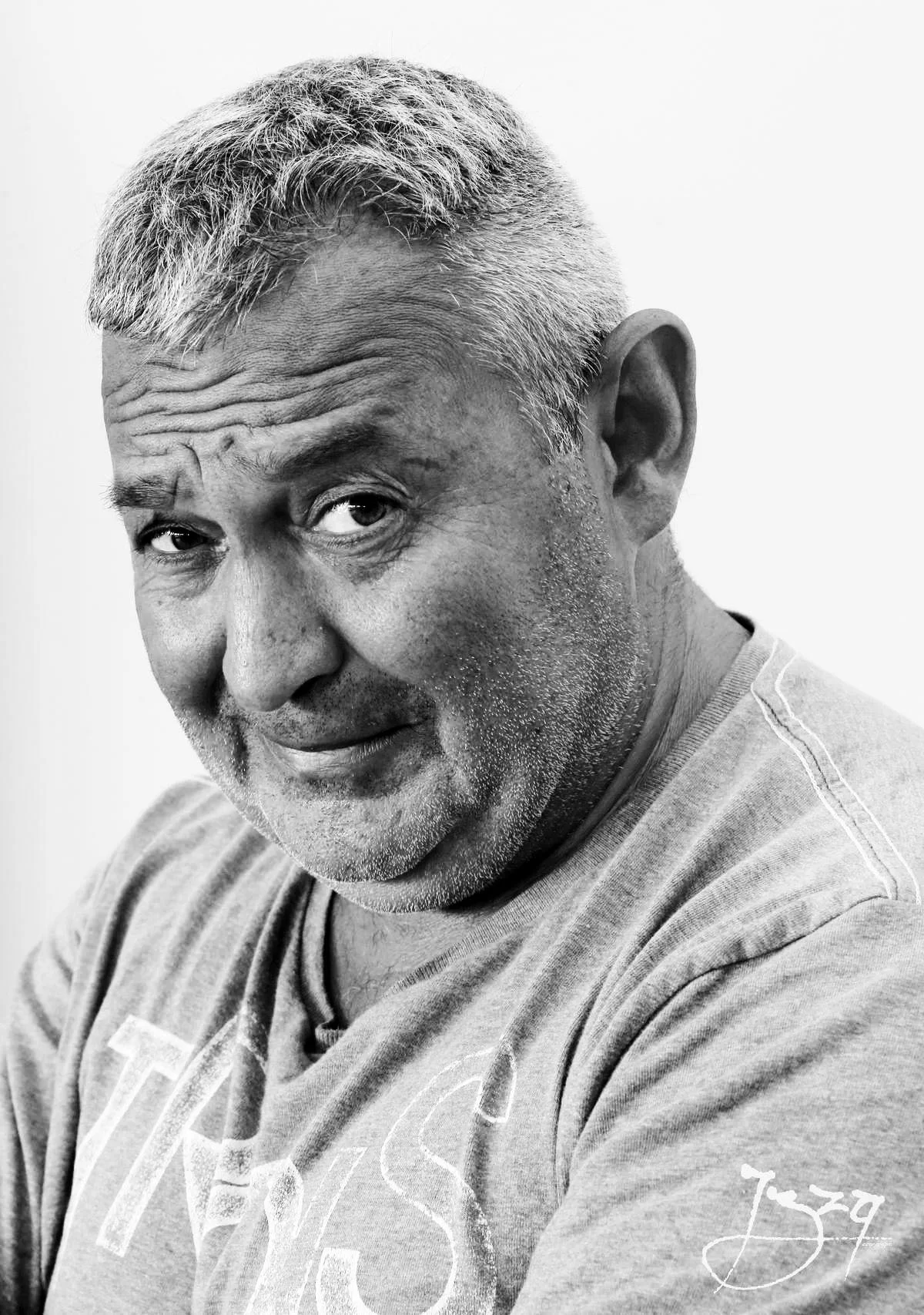
- Born: Károly Tóth; 16 April 1963; Budapest, Hungary
- Died: 4 January 2020 (aged 56); Budapest, Hungary
- Occupation: Actor
- Years active: 1988–2020
- Spouse: Claudia Liptai (m. 2006; div. 2009)
- Children: 5

Károly Gesztesi (born Károly Tóth; 16 April 1963 – 4 January 2020) was a Hungarian actor. He was also known as voice actor, in particular for providing the Hungarian dubbing of Shrek from the movie of the same name.

== Life and career ==
Gesztesi graduated from the Academy of Drama and Film in Budapest and, until 1990, he was a member of the Thalia Theater company. In the 1990s, he acted with such companies as the National Theatre of Miskolc, the Attila József Theatre, and the Comedy Theatre of Budapest.

Described as one of Hungary's best-known actors, Gesztesi played in numerous Hungarian TV and cinema productions, including Magyar Vándor in 2004, Just Sex and Nothing Else in 2005 and Children of Glory.

"With his characteristic voice", he was also one of Hungary's most famous voice actors. He voiced Shrek in the Hungarian version of the film.

His eldest son is the actor Máté Gesztesi.

== Death ==
On 4 January 2020, Gesztesi died from a heart attack in Budapest while in his car.

== Filmography ==
=== As actor ===
==== Film ====
- Vörös vurstli (1991)
- Stationary (1996)
- Balekok és banditák (1997)
- Közel a szerelemhez (1998)
- Hamvadó cigarettavég (2001)
- A Kind of America
- Nincs mese (2003)
- Titkos hely (2003)
- Telitalálat (2003)
- Getno (2004)
- Nyócker! (2004)
- Magyar Vándor
- Just Sex and Nothing Else (2005)
- Children of Glory (2006)
- Last Minute, directed by Gergely Fonyó (2006)
- Megy a közös (2007)
- Valami Amerika 2 (2008) (A Kind of America, part II)
- Papírkutyák (2009)
- Szuperbojz, directed by Barna Kabay (2009)
- Cop Mortem (2016)

==== Television ====
- Hajnali párbeszéd (1986)
- Szomszédok (1988)
- Angyalbőrben (1990)
- Kis Romulusz (1994)
- Helló, Doki (1997)
- Az öt zsaru (1998)
- TV a város szélén (1998)
- 7-es csatorna (1999)
- Kisváros (TV series) (1997–2000)
- A titkos hely (2002)
- Nem a Te napod! (2006)
- Mennyből az angyal…
- Tea (TV series) (2002–2003)
- Csaó, Bambinó! (2005)
- Ilyenek voltunk! (2007)
- Jóban Rosszban (2005–2014)

=== As voice actor ===
His credits as voice actor include the following:

==== TV Series ====
Film	Role	Syncing
Baywatch	Garner Ellerbee	Gregory Alan Williams
Central Park West	Mark Merrill	Tom Verica
Renegade	Bobby Sixkiller	Branscombe Richmond
Sirènes, sirènes	Richard Stiles	Christopher Judge
The A Team	Bosco Albert "B.A." Baracus	Mr. T
Highlander	Duncan 'Mac/Highlander' MacLeod	Adrian Paul
Kórház a pálmák alatt	Clemant	Charles M. Huber
Das Boot	Werner	Herbert Grönemeyer
Inspector Rex	Peter Höllerer	Wolf Bachofner
Spin City	Paul Lassiter	Richard Kind
Robin Hood	Little John	Richard Ashton
Baywatch Nights	Garner Ellerbee	Gregory Alan Williams
Nash Bridges	Joe Dominguez	Cheech Marin
The Enforcer	Mr. Chapel	Michael Madsen
Players	Isaac 'Ice' Gregory	Ice-T
Footballers' Wives	Jason Turner	Cristian Solimeno
The Wire	William 'Bunk' Moreland	Wendell Pierce
Game of Thrones	Robert Baratheon	Mark Addy

==== Feature films ====
Film	Year	Character	Syncing
Lock Up	1989	Frank Leone	Sylvester Stallone
Puss in Boots	1999	Óriás	Kevin Dorsey
Dawn of the Dead	2004	Kenneth	Ving Rhames
Pet Sematary II	1992	Sheriff Gus Gilbert	Clancy Brown
Star Wars	1995	Lando Calrissian	Billy Dee Williams
Monsters Inc.	2001	James P. "Sulley" Sullivan	John Goodman
Monsters University	2013	James P. "Sulley" Sullivan	John Goodman
Jingle All The Way	1996	Sinbad	Myron Larabee
Cars	2006	Mater	Larry the Cable Guy
Cars 2	2011	Mater	Larry the Cable Guy
Cars 3	2017	Mater	Larry the Cable Guy
Shrek	2001	Shrek	Mike Myers
Shrek 2	2004	Shrek	Mike Myers
Shrek the Third	2007	Shrek	Mike Myers
Shrek Forever After	2010	Shrek	Mike Myers
Shrek the Halls	2007	Shrek	Mike Myers
Scared Shrekless	2010	Shrek	Mike Myers
The Princess and the Frog	2009	Louie	Michael-Leon Wooley

== Awards ==
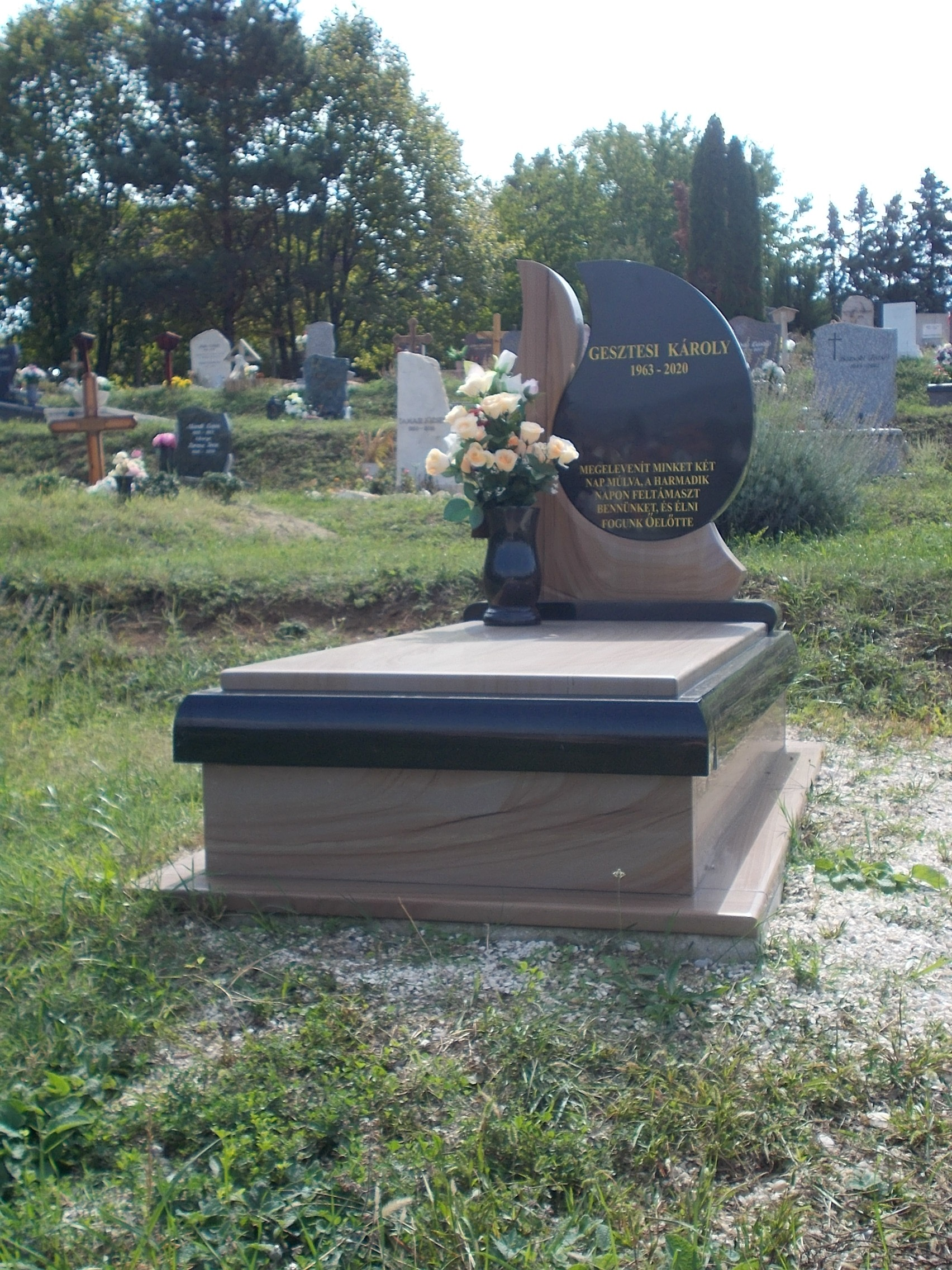
Károly Gesztesi's grave in Budapest (2022).

- Citizen of honour of Miskolc (1990)
- Filmszemle for Best Actor in a Series episode (1997)
- VOXCar Award (2002)
- Lions Award (2006)
- Story "Five Star" Award (2006; 2009)
