= Álom.net =

- Theatrical release poster
- Directed by: Gábor N. Forgács
- Written by: Gábor N. Forgács; Kristóf Steiner
- Produced by: József Cirkó; Edina Salla
- Starring: Lilla Labancz; Kinga Czifra; Ádám Csernóczki
- Cinematography: Zsolt Tóth
- Edited by: Gergely Roszik
- Music by: Zsolt Kárpáti; Zoltán Makai
- Production companies: HCC Media Group; Parabel Studio
- Release date: 16 April 2009
- Running time: 90 minutes
- Country: Hungary
- Language: Hungarian

Álom.net, also known as Dream Well, is a 2009 Hungarian romantic comedy film written and directed by Gábor N. Forgács.

The film was panned by critics, with some considering it to be one of the worst films ever made.

== Synopsis ==
Regina, the once popular girl has to make new friends at her new, conservative school. Problems arrive when she becomes enemies with Lívia, the school's queen bee, and falls in love with Márk, a musician. If these weren't enough, she decides to organize a cheerleader team.

== Cast ==
- Lilla Labancz as Regina
- Kinga Czifra as Lívia
- Ádám Csernóczki as Márk
- Attila Jankóczky as Dávid
- István Széni as Gábor
- János Szücs as Tomi
- Zoli Ádok as Geri
- Arnold Tarsoly as Pityu
- Dorottya Farsang as Vivien
- Eszter Iszak as Szandra
- Ottília Lerch as Laura
- Petra F. Tóth as Andrea
- Laura Marsi as Orsa
- Kristóf Steiner as Krisztián
- Ildikó Incze as Katalin
- Pál Oberfrank as András
- István Tamási as Ricsi
- Bence Balázs as Niko
- Richárd Reiter as Szabi
- Szandra Szabó as Detti
- Zsófi Komáromi as Alíz
- Réka Nádai as Krisztina
- Gábor Reviczky as School principal
- Károly Rékasi as Mr. Károly
- Éva Mészáros as Auntie Ica
- Ágnes Bánfalvy as Márta

== Reception ==
Álom.net was widely panned by viewers for its poor writing, acting, problems with continuity, and cultural inaccuracy, among others. 444.hu wrote that it is "the worst movie of all time, and that’s why it became a cult film". Furthermore, 24.hu and Index.hu each named it the worst Hungarian film ever made, and it gained international notoriety by becoming the lowest rated film on IMDb's Bottom 100 list in 2011. British film magazine Total Film named it the fourth worst film ever made and FMC.hu included it on their list of the ten worst films ever made. Origo called it "one of the worst Hungarian films of [the decade]".

== Proposed sequel ==
In 2014, a Facebook page was created which encouraged fans to support Álom.net 2.

== See also ==
- List of 21st-century films considered the worst
