= Emil Keres =

Hungarian actor and theatre director

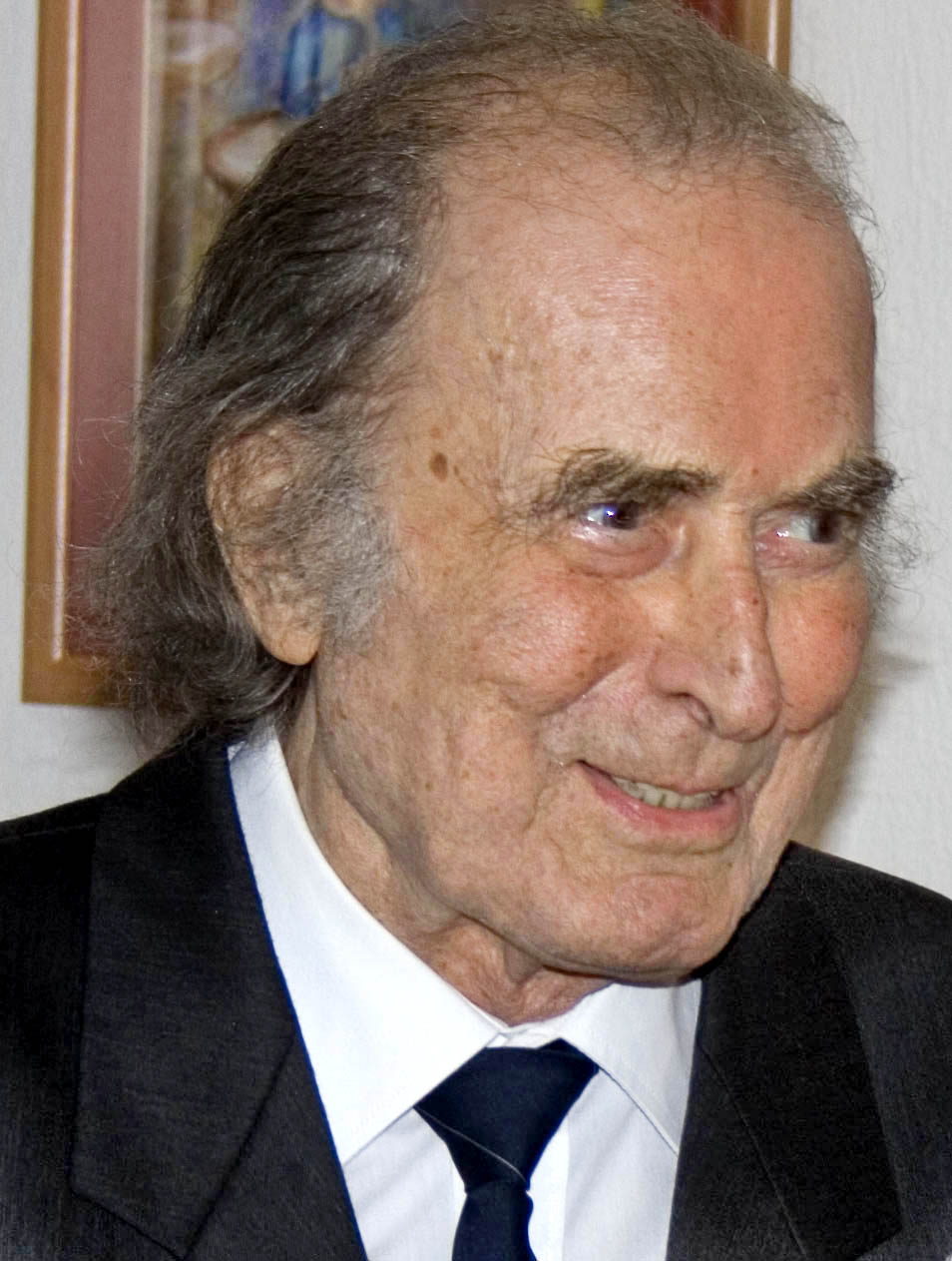
- Emil Keres (2010)
- Born: Keres Emil; 9 July 1925; Szombathely, Hungary
- Died: 1 April 2016 (aged 90); Hungary
- Occupation: Actor
- Years active: 1950–2015
- Awards: Kossuth Prize (1965)

Emil Keres (9 July 1925 – 1 April 2016) was a Hungarian actor and theatre director.

== Selected filmography ==
List of acting performances in film and television
Year	Title	Role	Note
1965	Children's Sicknesses	Apa	
1965	Twenty Hours	Reporter	
1965	A vörös vendégfogadó	Félix gróf	
1967	Temporary Cloudiness	Sebesult	
1968	Próféta voltál szívem	Kenderessy karmester	
1969	Those Who Wear Glasses	Ormai	
1970	Igézö	Beszelõ	
1972	Hekus lettem	Gyáros	
1973	Gözfürdö	Ermitázsov	
1976	Beszterce ostroma	Fõispán	TV series (Season 1, Episode 3)
1980	Kojak Budapesten	Kojak régi kollégája	
2005	Csudafilm	Odas Gavrilos	
2007	The End	Kiss Emil	
2010	Géniusz, az alkimista	János	TV series (3 episodes)
2012	Dear Betrayed Friends	Gyula bácsi	

== Awards ==
- Kossuth Prize (1965)
