= Blood and High Heels =

Blood and High Heels (Vér és tűsarok)
- Directed by: Dávid Géczy
- Produced by: Szabó Béla; Deák Péter
- Starring: Sonia Couling; Iván Kamarás
- Cinematography: Dániel Farkas
- Edited by: Attila Lecza
- Music by: Márton Vojnits
- Distributed by: SYSPLEX Film & Dotkom Media
- Release date: 2012
- Running time: 30 minutes
- Country: Hungary
- Language: English

Blood and High Heels (Hungarian: Vér és tűsarok) is a 2012 Hungarian short film, directed and written by Dávid Géczy. It was included in the Cannes Film Festival Short Film Corner. The film was also included in the France and Los Angeles Film Market list. It stars Iván Kamarás and Sonia Couling.

== Plot ==
The film is about workplace sexual harassment, and the relationship between a feminist secretary and a chauvinistic boss in the current world economic crisis.

Rose Red (Sonia Couling) gets a new job as a secretary, and her boss, Ivan Milkov (Iván Kamarás), thinks the world is in crises caused by women.

== Cast ==
- Sonia Couling - Rose Red
- Iván Kamarás - Ivan Milkov
- Alexis Latham - director

== Music ==
- "The Same Wind Blows" - Marton Vojnits
