= The Porcelain Doll =

2005 film

- Directed by: Péter Gárdos
- Written by: Péter Gárdos
- Produced by: Dénes Szekeres
- Starring: Juci Balog
- Cinematography: Tibor Máthé
- Release date: 5 February 2005
- Running time: 75 minutes
- Country: Hungary
- Language: Hungarian

The Porcelain Doll (Hungarian: A porcelánbaba) is a 2005 Hungarian drama film directed by Péter Gárdos. It was entered into the 27th Moscow International Film Festival.

== Cast ==
- Juci Balog
- Juci Barabás
- László Beles
- Lajos Bertók as Tiszt (segment "A bajnok")
- Istvánné Burga
- István Csala
- Sándor Csányi as Csurmándi (segment "Porcelánbaba")
- Ferencné Császár
- Rozál Csótár
- Elemér Czifra
