= Sándor Csányi (actor) =

Hungarian actor (born 1975)

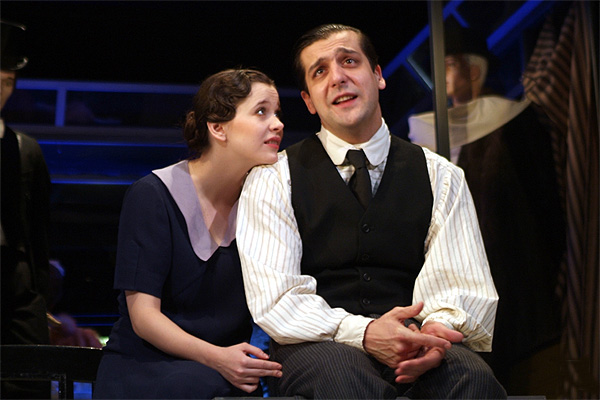
- Ágnes Kovalik and Sándor Csányi at the play "Riviéra" of the Radnóti Theatre
- Born: 19 December 1975 (age 50); Budapest, Hungary
- Years active: 1999-present
- Spouse(s): Lia Pokorny (?–divorced), Réka Tenki (m. 2012–present)
- Children: 3
- Awards: Hungarian Film Critics Award for Best Actor; 2004 Kontroll; Fringe Report Award for Best Actor; 2005 Kontroll; FICCO Award for Best Actor; 2005 Kontroll

Sándor Csányi (born 19 December 1975), is a Hungarian actor.

== Biography ==
Csányi aimed to be an actor from an early age and was admitted into the University of Theatre and Film Arts in Budapest on his fourth attempt. In 2002, he became a member of the Radnóti Theatre in Budapest.

His earliest film role was lending his voice for the 1999 film Sitiprinc and he followed this up by starring in shorts Az Ember, akit kihagytak and uristenmenny.hu ('god at heaven' translated) the following year. He then had small roles in a number of films until 2003 when he starred in Nimród Antal's critically acclaimed Kontroll. He has since become somewhat of a leading man in Hungarian cinema, starring in such films as Just Sex and Nothing Else, Rokonok and Children of Glory.

He was married to Hungarian actress Lia Pokorny, who he has worked alongside on a number of films. They have one son (born 2003).

== Filmography ==
- Sitiprinc (1999) ...Horváth Rudolf (voice)
- Uristen@menny.hu (1999) ...Thief
- Jadviga párnája (2000) ...Rosza Pali
- This I Wish and Nothing More (2000)...Strici
- Pizzaman (2001) ...Portás 2
- Nexxt (2001) ...Balfék
- I Love Budapest (2001) ...Miki
- Citromfej (2001) ...Constructor
- Szent Iván napja (2003) ...Misi
- A Bus Came... (2003) ...Miklós
- Kontroll (2003) ...Bulcsú
- Magyar vándor (2004) ...Tartar messenger
- The Unburied Man (2004)
- Stop Mom Theresa (2004) ...David
- The Porcelian Doll (2005) ...Csurmándi
- A Fény ösvényei (2005) ...Alex
- Az Igazi Mikulás (2005) ...Dr. Lápossy
- Just Sex and Nothing Else (2005) ...Tamás
- Rokonok (2006) ...István Kopjáss
- Children of Glory (2006) ...Tibi Vámos
- Idegölő (2006) ...The gas-man
- S.O.S. Love! (2007) ...Péter
- Nosedive (2007) ...Cameo
- Chameleon (2008) ...Márk
- Adventure (2011)
- Coming Out (2013)
- Eternal Winter (2018) ...Rajmund
