= András Gáspár (actor) =

András Gáspár (formerly András Tóth-Gáspár; born 18 August 1970 in Budapest, Hungary) is a Hungarian actor, editor and presenter.

== Life ==
Gáspár is best known for dubbing Seann William Scott in the American Pie and MouseHunt, and Kung Fu Panda 1-2 voicing Po. 1992–1994 from a member of the National Theatre, then he became a freelancer.

He played at the Attila József Theatre. He played as a guest artist for the Hungarian Theatre troupe. He has been working in the media as an editor since 1994. He worked at mSATA, TV3, RTL Klub, and is currently trading televisions and a MTVA employee.

Since 2002, he has been part of Foreign Trade faculty at the Budapest College of Economics, the International Communications Department, and correspondence courses for graduate students. In 2005, he graduated in economics. He also graduated from Academy of Drama and Film in Budapest in 1993 carried out. He was also an actor at the Guildhall School in 1991 and later the British American Drama Academy and was a student at their acting department in 1992.

His wife is a fellow actor and they have three children (two born in 1991, and one in 1997).

== Roles ==
=== Films ===
- A holnap munkája, presenter
- American Reunion (2012) syncing audio
- Kung Fu Panda 2 (2011), syncing (Po)
- Gulliver's Travels ( 2010), syncing
- Az Alef labirintusa (2008; TV-film)
- Kung Fu Panda (2008), syncing (Po)
- Rendőrsztori (Hungarian-action film series, 2000)
- Európa expressz (Hungarian action film, 1998)
- Kisváros (Hungarian television drama series, 1996) (TV-film)
- Kutyakomédiák (Hungarian comedy series, 1992) (TV-film)
- Itt a szabadság! (Hungarian fictional film, 1990)
- Angyalbőrben (Hungarian television series, 1988)
- The Fairly OddParents (American cartoon series), Cosmo (Nickelodeon)
- Total Drama, syncing (D.J.)
- The Looney Tunes Show, Daffy Duck
- Bananas in Pyjamas, B1

=== Theatre ===
- Andersen (bemutató: 2004. 5 November. Szegedi Nemzeti Színház) actor
- Andersen ( – 2012.) (bemutató: 2004. 3 December. Magyar Színház) actor
- CS.A.J. (CSakAzértisJáték) bemutató: 2009. február 20. Budapesti Kamaraszínház – Ericsson Stúdió) actor
- G.Ö.R.CS. (Görögök Összes Cselekedetei) (bemutató: 2000. 15 October. Centrál Színház) színész, szerző
- Gramp (bemutató: Budapest Bábszínház) rendező, dramaturg
- Isteni Show (bemutató: 2001. 21 October. Centrál Színház) színész, szerző
- Mondod-e még a szót, szeretlek? (bemutató: József Attila Színház) actor
- Rocky Horror Show (bemutató: 2004. 18 April. Musical Színház) actor
- S.Ö.R. (Shakespeare Összes Rövidítve) (bemutató: Centrál Színház) actor, átdolgozta
