= Zavarov =

Zavarov (Russian: Заваров) is a Russian masculine surname, its feminine counterpart is Zavarova. It may refer to

- Oleksandr Zavarov (born 1961), Ukrainian football midfielder
- Valeriy Zavarov (born 1988), Ukrainian football midfielder, son of Oleksandr
