= Iván Fenyő =

Hungarian actor

- Born: 15 June 1979 (age 46); Budapest, Hungary

Iván Fenyő (born 15 June 1979) is a Hungarian actor.

He made his studies at the University of Drama, Film and Television, Budapest.

Fenyő made his feature film debut as an American Marine in Jarhead, directed by Sam Mendes. He went on to play the lead in the Hungarian films Kútfejek, Children of Glory, S.O.S. Szerelem! and 9 és fél randi. He has a minor role in Magyar Szépség directed by Péter Gothár.
