= Ron Ellis (author) =

British novelist, broadcaster, and journalist (born 1941)

Ronald Walter Ellis (born 12 September 1941) has been, among other occupations, a crime novelist, broadcaster, and journalist. In 1992, The Sun described him as the "man with the most jobs in Britain".

== Background ==
Born in Southport, England, he studied library science at Liverpool Polytechnic. In 1966, he became one of the country's first mobile D.J.s. In 1976, he was appointed Northern Promotion Manager for WEA (Warner Bros. Records, Elektra Records and Atlantic Records). He recorded a hit song, a punk anthem, "Boys on the Dole", which charted in the top 10 on the New Wave charts in 1979. In 1984, American biographer Albert Goldman hired him as British researcher for his book The Lives of John Lennon. Ellis also broadcast football reports for BBC Radio Merseyside.

Ellis has written two books of self-published poems, one of which won the national Sefton Poetry Award in 1992, and a comedy book, Journal of a Coffin Dodger, which was shortlisted for the Best British Audio Comedy Book in 2004.

Ellis has written 10 crime novels. The Johnny Ace series, published by Headline and Allison & Busby, features a Liverpool private investigator/radio presenter called Johnny Ace, and The DCI Glass series, three police procedurals. He also runs his own publishing company, Nirvana Books, featuring works by pop music broadcaster Spencer Leigh, local historian Joan A. Rimmer, and crime writers Kate Ellis and Eileen Dewhurst.

== Bibliography ==
The Johnny Ace crime novels

- Ears of the City
- Mean Streets
- Framed
- The Singing Dead
- Grave Mistake
- Single Shot
- City of Vultures

The DCI Glass crime novels

- Murder First Glass
- Snort of Kings
- Murder on the Internet Nirvana (under the title Playground Ppets)

Humour

- Journal of a Coffin Dodger

Social History

- Southport Faces

Poems

- Diary of a Discothèque
- The Last of the Lake Poets
