= Iván Kamarás =

Hungarian actor

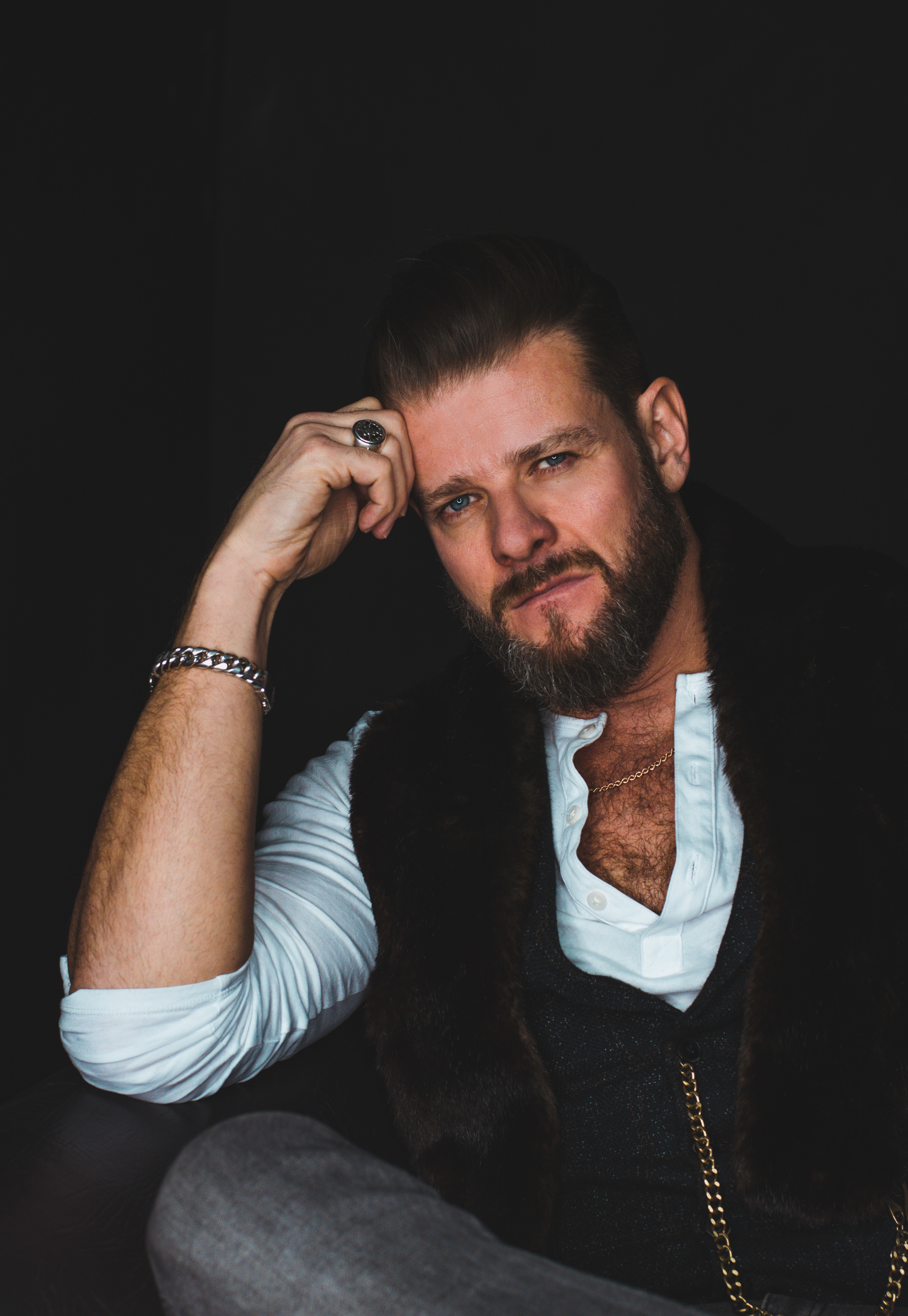
- Ivan Kamaras photographed by Steindl Máté in 2019
- Born: 22 December 1972 (age 53); Pécs, Hungary
- Occupation: Actor
- Notable work: Agent Steel in Hellboy II: The Golden Army; Tibor Orban in Silent Witness
- Height: 6 ft 2 in (1.88 m)
- Website: http://www.ivankamaras.com

Ivan Kamaras (born 22 December 1972) is a Hungarian actor who became first known worldwide for his role as Agent Steel in the 2008 superhero fantasy thriller Hellboy II: The Golden Army, directed by Guillermo del Toro. Kamaras voices the title character in the 2018 Hungarian animated feature Ruben Brandt, Collector.

== Personal life ==
Kamarás was born and raised in Pécs, Hungary. His mother, Teodóra Uhrik, and his stepfather, Pál Lovas, were both ballet dancers, and much of his childhood was spent in theatres. When he was seven, the family acquired a recording of the 1980 BBC production of Hamlet starring Derek Jacobi as Hamlet and Patrick Stewart as Claudius. Kamarás fell in love with the role of Hamlet and within two or three years had learned Hamlet's monologues from the play by heart. He was in elementary school when he became a regular member of an amateur acting company and by the time he was in high school he played his first serious role in a performance of the Pecs Chamber Theater. From 1991 to 1995, he studied at the Academy of Theatre and Film in Budapest.

After gaining experience with major theatrical companies and alternative theater groups, he emerged as one of Hungary's prominent actors. Despite continuing stage performances at various theaters until 2009, a growing passion for film led him to shift his focus. Seeking international exposure, he decided to relocate to the United States. Initially delving into directing, he later enrolled in filmmaking and acting courses, honing his skills for several years. Drawing from his combined Hungarian and American education and practical experience, he now imparts his knowledge by teaching acting classes at the inaugural accredited Hungarian school dedicated to training movie actors, which opened its doors to students in the fall of 2012.

His hobbies include sports and fitness training. He likes to promote charitable causes. Since 2014 he has been an Ambassador for the "Keznyom" campaign of SOS Children's Villages in Hungary.

== Career ==
=== Theatre ===
From 1995 until 1997 he was a member of the Budapest Chamber Theatre, between 1997 and 2008 a member of the Comedy Theatre of Budapest. He won widespread admiration for his first role playing Othello at the age of 23 in 1995. For the Budapest Chamber Theatre he has also starred as Horst in Martin Sherman’s Bent (1996), Treplyov in Anton Chekhov’s The Seagull (1997), Stanley Kowalski in Tennessee Williams's A Streetcar Named Desire in 1999 (a role he had previously played for the National Theatre of Győr in 1997), Romeo in Romeo and Juliet (1998), and James Tyrone Jr in A Moon for the Misbegotten by Eugene O’Neill (2003).

For the Comedy Theatre of Budapest he has played Wayne in Ben Elton’s Popcorn (1998), Alyosha in an adaptation of Dostoevsky's The Brothers Karamazov (1999), Edmund in King Lear (2001), Su Fu in Brecht’s The Good Person of Szechwan (2001), Raskolnikov in an adaptation of Dostoevsky's Crime and Punishment (2001), Eugenio in The Coffee House by Carlo Goldoni (2005), Benedict in Much Ado About Nothing (2007), and Trofimov and Pjotr Sergeyevich in The Cherry Orchard (2007).

He has also played Julien Sorel in an adaptation of The Red and the Black by Stendhal for Gyor National Theatre (1995), Brick in Williams's Cat on a Hot Tin Roof (2000) for the Pest Theatre, Antony in Antony and Cleopatra (2002) for the Pest Theatre, Robert Dudley, Earl of Leicester in Friedrich Schiller’s Mary Stuart (2006) for the Pest Theatre, Christian in Festen for the Pest Theatre (2006), Jamie in Jason Robert Brown’s one-act musical two-hander The Last Five Years for the Palace of the Arts (2007), a role he debuted in Hungary, and Ruy Blas in the Szeged National Theatre production of Victor Hugo's Ruy Blas (2009).

=== Film ===
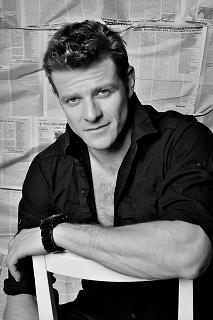
Photographed by Anna Kirschner in 2011

Aside from his role as Agent Steel in Hellboy II: The Golden Army, Kamarás has had an extensive career in Hungarian cinema. Notable roles have included the hit bedroom farce Out of Order (1997), in which he played a jealous boxer in pursuit of his errant girlfriend and her politician lover, the thriller Európa expressz (1999), in which he played Jimmy, a man who becomes caught up in events when the train he is in is hijacked by a Russian mafia boss, and more recently the cult comedy GlassTiger 3 (2010), in which he played Ferenc Csopkai, a rich lawyer who pursues the bumbling heroes after they steal his car and with it a huge sum in cash. In 2013 Kamarás starred in the film Outpost: Rise of the Spetsnaz.

=== Television ===
In addition to Silent Witness – in which his character, detective Tibor Orban, helped to uncover a baby-farming racket in Budapest while trying to track down series regular, forensic pathologist Dr Harry Cunningham – Kamarás has played Pipin, the son of Charlemagne, in the miniseries Charlemagne (1993); Louis II, King of Hungary, in the costume drama Mohacs (1995); Ivan, a man who becomes obsessed on his wedding day with his newly met twin sister in Alice and the Seven Wolves (2009); and the machiavellian nightclub owner and antihero Evil in the 10-part drama First Generation (2001). He was also the creative force behind Mobile Poem, a series of poetry readings done by notable Hungarian actors and filmed on mobile phone, which screened on the Hungarian TV channel MTV1 in 2009. In January 2011, he played a Hungarian detective, Tibor Orban, in Bloodlines, the fourth episode in the 14th series of the BBC crime drama Silent Witness. In 2014 he played the role of Rasputin in the two-part History Channel miniseries Houdini.

=== Music ===
He has released two solo pop albums – Bombajó (2000), and Revelation (2005) – and been a contributor to two others, So We Sing (2003) and Actor Songs (2009).

=== Directing ===
Kamarás has shot an experimental film on his mobile phone, Sigh, which was inspired by the Yukio Mishima drama Aoi no Ue and which screened at the Hungarian Film Festival in 2005 and the Moziünnep film festival in 2006. He undertook a course in directing at UCLA in 2009 and in the same year directed a production of Tchaikovsky’s opera Eugene Onegin at Keszthely Castle, Hungary.

=== Awards ===
- Szinikritikusok critics’ award (1996) for Othello,
- Andor Ajtay memorial award (2000), given annually to the best actor and actress in the Comedy Theatre of Budapest,
- Hegedűs Gyula award (2000) for Cat on a Hot Tin Roof,
- Súgó Csiga díj (2003) a prize for most popular actor voted for by audiences,
- Mari Jászai Award (2006) a state award given in recognition for acting excellence, is the premier award of national dramatic artists,
- VII. National Theatre Festival of Pécs (2007) for best male actor of the year award for Festen,
- Gold Medallion Award (2012) actor of the year audience award

== Theatrical roles ==
Number of his registered theatrical presentations in the Hungarian Theatre Database : 56.

Date of the presentation	Theatre	Play (director)	Role
26–29 December 2015	Syma Events Hall and Convention Center	Toy-Maker (Pop-Musical Show with screened English-language subtitles, directed by György Bőhm) Hungarian title: Játékkészitő	Keptén Kapitány the pirate captain
January 2011	Katona József Theatre	Presnyakov brothers: Playing the Victim (directed by Vilmos Vajdai); Hungarian title: Cserenadrág	Verhuskin
30 January 2009	Szeged National Theatre	Victor Hugo: Ruy Blas (directed by István Zamenák)	Ruy Blas
5 December 2008	Budapest Moulin Rouge	Gergely Zöldi: Bonnie and Clyde media gangster romance (directed by György Bőhm)	Clyde
20 October 2008	Óbuda Social Club	Guest at the west table (literary editor Zoltán Fráter)	himself
5 April 2008	Comedy Theatre of Budapest	Pierre Beaumarchais: The Marriage of Figaro or the Day of Madness (directed by Enikő Eszenyi)	Count Almaviva, governor of Andalusia
3 November 2007	Comedy Theatre of Budapest	William Shakespeare: Much Ado About Nothing (directed by Enikő Eszenyi)	Benedetto
29 September 2007	Hero’s Square, Budapest	The Birth of a Country (directed by Sándor Román); Original title: Szent István – Egy ország születése	Szent László
4 July 2007	Károlyi Garden, Budapest	Yvette Bozsik Company: Cabaret Berlin (directed by Yvette Bozsik)	
18 March 2007	Comedy Theatre of Budapest	A. P. Chekhov: The Cherry Orchard (directed by Róbert Alföldi)	Trofimov, Pjotr Sergeyevich
5 January 2007	Palace of Arts Budapest, Festival Theatre	Jason Robert Brown: The Last Five Years (directed by György Bőhm)	Jamie
7 October 2006	Pest Theatre	Thomas Vinterberg – Mogens Rukov – Bo Hansen: Festen (directed by Enikő Eszenyi)	Christian
30 April 2006	Home Theatre Emese Vasvári	Yukio Mishima: Aoi (directed by Emese Vasvári)	Hikaru
2006	TÁP Theatre	Everything Is Bad Variety Show (directed by Vilmos Vajdai); Original title: Minden Rossz Varieté	well-known celebrity, celeb
20 January 2006	Comedy Theatre of Budapest	Maurice Maeterlinck: The Blue Bird (directed by Sándor Zsótér)	The Fairy Bérylune, Light, The Oak, Neighbour Berlingot, Neighbour Berlingot’s little daughter
8 October 2006	Pest Theatre	Friedrich Schiller: Mary Stuart (directed by Róbert Alföldi)	Robert Dudley, Earl of Leicester
5 July 2005	Gyula Castle Theatre	Chaplet of Shakespeare - theatre, theatre, theatre (directed by Attila Vidnyánszky)	participant
18 March 2005	Comedy Theatre of Budapest	Carlo Goldoni: The Coffee House (directed by Péter Valló)	Eugenio
8 October 2004	Sándor Hevesi Theatre, Zalaegerszeg	Imre Madách: The Tragedy of Man (directed by József Ruszt)	Lucifer
8 April 2004	Comedy Theatre of Budapest	Nikolai Gogol: The Inspector (directed by Péter Valló)	Ivan Aleksandrovich Hlestakov, inspector from Saint Petersburg
17 January 2004	Comedy Theatre of Budapest	Gyula Krúdy: The Crimson Coach (directed by Géza Tordy)	Kázmér Rezeda
7 March 2003	Tivoli, Budapest Chamber Theatre	Eugene O'Neill: A Moon for the Misbegotten (directed by Géza Tordy)	James Tyrone Jr.
30 December 2002	Comedy Theatre of Budapest	Mihály Eisemann – Imre Egri-Halász – István Békeffy: A Kiss and Nothing More (directed by Géza Hegedűs D.)	Sándor
13 April 2002	Pest Theatre	William Shakespeare: Antony and Cleopatra (directed by Enikő Eszenyi)	Antony
21 December 2001	Comedy Theatre of Budapest	William Shakespeare: King Lear (directed by Gábor Tompa)	Edmund, natural Son to Gloucester
6 October 2001	Comedy Theatre of Budapest	Bertolt Brecht: The Good Person of Szechwan (directed by Sándor Zsótér)	Su Fu, barber
20 April 2001	Comedy Theatre of Budapest	Fyodor Dostoyevsky: Crime and Punishment (directed by Géza Tordy)	Raskolnikov
13 October 2000	Tivoli, Budapest Chamber Theatre	Arthur Miller: Death of a Salesman (directed by Pál Sándor)	Biff
19 February 2000	Pest Theatre	Tennessee Williams: Cat on a Hot Tin Roof (directed by Gábor Máté)	Brick
2 December 1999 (role taken over in March 2004)	Tivoli, Budapest Chamber Theatre	Tennessee Williams: A Streetcar Named Desire (directed by Géza Tordy)	Stanley
16 October 1999	Comedy Theatre of Budapest	Fyodor Dostojevsky: The Brothers Karamazov (directed by János Szikora)	Ilyusha
1999	Szeged Open-Air Theatre	Tibor Déry: An Imaginary Report on an American Pop Festival (directed by Balázs Kovalik)	József
7 May 1999	Pest Theatre	Attila Réthly: Dead or Alive (directed by Attila Réthly)	Günter
27 February 1999	Pest Theatre	Here There Over There (directed by István Horvai): Chekhov: The Wedding; Bertolt Brecht: A Respectable Wedding; Ilf and Petrov: Sensual Passion	Babelmandebskiy; Hans; Chulanov
1998	Comedy Theatre of Budapest	Ben Elton: Popcorn (directed by László Marton)	Wayne
1998	Tivoli, Budapest Chamber Theatre	William Shakespeare: Romeo and Juliet (directed by József Ruszt)	Romeo
30 November 1997	Pest Theatre	Róbert Alföldi: The Phaedra Story (directed by Róbert Alföldi)	Hippolutos
15 February 1997	Budapest Chamber Theatre – Ericsson Studio	A.P. Chekhov: The Sea-Gull (directed by Róbert Alföldi)	Treplyov
1997	Győr National Theatre	Tennessee Williams: A Streetcar Named Desire (directed by Csaba Kiss)	Stanley
1996	Budapest Chamber Theatre	Martin Sherman: Bent (directed by Róbert Alföldi)	Horst
1996	Budapest Chamber Theatre	József Katona: Bánk Bán (directed by József Ruszt)	Ottó
28 January 1996	Pest Theatre	László Dés – Péter Geszti – Pál Békés: The Jungle Book (directed by Géza Hegedûs D.)	Shere Khan
1995	Budapest Chamber Theatre	Pedro Calderón de la Barca: The Constant Prince	Muley
1995	Győr National Theatre	Stendhal: The Red and the Black (directed by György Bőhm)	Julien Sorel
28 October 1995	Budapest Chamber Theatre	William Shakespeare: Othello (directed by József Ruszt)	Othello His first widely acclaimed performance both by professionals and audiences.

=== Theatre Directing ===
- 9 marc 2009, Keszthely, Pyotr Ilyich Tchaikovsky: Eugene Onegin (opera) (directed by: Ivan Kamaras)

== Filmography ==
=== Film ===
Year	Title	Role	Notes
1996	Stationary		Short (Hungary)
1996	Ezüstnitrát		(France) - (Italy) - (Hungary)
1996	Bolse vita	Árva	(Hungary)
1996	A bűvész		Short (Hungary)
1997	A miniszter félrelép	Marosi Róbert	(Hungary)
1998	Európa expressz	Jimmy	(Hungary)
1999	A Morel fiú	Géza	Short (Hungary)
2000	Fehér alsó		(Hungary)
2001	A csodálatos mandarin	Tramp	Short (Hungary)
2001	Vademberek	István	(Hungary)
2002	Szerelem utolsó vérig	Dandy	(Hungary)
2002	Szent Iván napja	Székely Iván	(Hungary)
2002	Somlói galuska		short (Hungary)
2003	Libiomfi	színész a válogatáson	(Hungary)
2005	Sóhajok		iPhonefilm (Hungary) 50 min Actor, Director, Cinematographer, Producer
2005	Le a fejjel!	Kozár, a bérgyilkos	(Hungary)
2006	Semleges hely	Man	short (Hungary)
2008	Para	Viktor	(Hungary)
2008	Hellboy II: The Golden Army	Agent Steel	(United States)
2009	Team Building	Sanyi	(Hungary)
2010	Igazából apa	Bálint	(Hungary)
2010	Sudden Death!	Thug	(United States)
2010	Üvegtigris 3.	Dr. Csopkai Ferenc	(Hungary)
2010	A tüke fenomén	Himself	documentary (Hungary)
2011	A Love Affair of Sorts	Boris	(United States)
2012	Blood and High Heels	Ivan Milkov	short (Hungary)
2012	Aglaja	Milo	(Hungary)
2012	Rabbi vagy miazisten	Tibi	Short (Hungary)
2012	The Mark	Phillyp Turk	(United States)
2013	The Mark: Redemption	Phillyp Turk	(Netherlands)
2013	A Good Day to Die Hard	G-Wagon Driver	(United States)
2013	100 Degrees Below Zero	Dr. Goldschein	(United States)
2013	The Developer	the Jumpsuit Guy	Short (Hungary)
2013	World War Z	Gambling Soldier	(United States)
2014	Üzenet	Nyurga	Short (Hungary)
2013	Outpost: Rise of the Spetsnaz	Fyodor	(United Kingdom)
2014	Dumapárbaj	Kész átverés show műsorvezető	(Hungary)
2014	Megdönteni Hajnal Tímeát	Róbert	(Hungary)
2014	Apám megmutatja	Miklós	Short (Hungary)
2014	A győztes	Kovács István (in 1980)	short (Hungary)
2015	Spy	Club Emcee	(United States)
2015	Lámpagyújtogatók	Himself	(Hungary)
2016	Cop Mortem	John Holdon	(Hungary)
2017	High & Outside - a baseball noir	Hans	(United States)
2017	Dead End	The Hungarian	(United Kingdom)
2018	The Big Shot (A Nagy Dobás)	Misi	short (Hungary)

=== Television ===
Year	Title	Role	Notes
1994	Charlemagne, le prince à cheval (Episodes: L'empereur, Le roi)	Prince Pippin	Mini-Series
1996	Othello	Othello	theater TV coverage (Budapest Chamber Theatre)
1996	Mohács	Louis II of Hungary	The TV film won the Hungarian Film Critics Award 1996 ″Best TV Feature″ prize
1996	Egy csésze fekete (A cup of black...)		Mini-Series (from the most interesting crimes of the XXth century, 3 parts)
1998	Hölgyválasz (Episode: Career)	Himself	Series
1999	Családi album		Series
1999	Esti showder	Himself	TV show
2001	Első generáció	Evil	Series
2001	Mikor síel az oroszlán?	The man in Semmering	
2003	Szeret, nem szeret	Himself	Series short
2006	Köszönet a szabadság hőseinek	Miklós (in 1956)	(A film from the Hungarian Revolution of 1956)
2007	Szent István - Egy Ország Születése	Ladislaus I of Hungary	(Historical Rock Musical 2007, Hero Square (Exclusive Open Air Stage), Budapest)
2009	MobilVers	Himself	Idea from Iván Kamarás, Cinematographer (a series of poetry)
2009	Beugró	Himself	TV show
2009	Alíz és a hét farkas	Iván	
2009	Hús vétkek		
2009	Találd ki magad!		
2011	Silent Witness (Episodes: Bloodlines Part 1-2)	Tibor Orban	Series
2011	Feljegyzések az egérlyukból	Zverkov	(adaptation)
2012	Százbólegy	Strange Man	Series
2013	Las aventuras del capitán Alatriste	Fiore	Series
2013	Strike Back	Skander	HBO-Series
2013	Dracula	Auctioneer	Series
2014	Fleming: The Man Who Would Be Bond	German Officer - Von Ostheim	Mini-Series
2014	Houdini (Part1: Rasputin)	Rasputin	Mini-Series
2015	Kossuthkifli	Péntek Kajetán	Series
2016	Tömény történelem	Dracula / Koppány / Francis II Rákóczi / story-teller	Mini-Series
2017	Korhatáros szerelem	Viktor	Series
2018	Csak színház és más semmi (3. Series)	Tomi	Series

=== Video games ===
Year	Title	Role	Notes
2022	Call of Duty: Modern Warfare II	"Fender" Takacs	

=== Sync ===
Selection from the Hungarian Online Sync Database

Title	Role	Actor/Actress	Notes
The Wire	Russell ’Stringer’ Bell	Idris Elba	
Nigel Boswell	Agent006	Clive Owen	
Valiant	Gixer	Ricky Gervais	
Superman: Doomsday	Clark Kent (Superman)	Adam Baldwin	
The Hitchhiker's Guide to the Galaxy	Zaphod Beeblebrox	Sam Rockwell	
The Chronicles of Narnia	Prince Caspian	Cornell John	
The Reaping	Doug Blackwell	David Morrissey	
The Lookout	Gary Spargo	Matthew Goode	
Immigrants (L.A. Dolce Vita)	Mr. Csapó	Dan Castellaneta	
Snitch	John Matthews	Dwayne Johnson	
A Single Shot	John Moon	Sam Rockwell	
The Nut Job	Grayson	Brendan Fraser	
Ruben Brandt, Collector	Ruben Brandt	Iván Kamarás	Ηungarian Feature on Art and Animation
The Demolisher of the World and the Restorers (Világzabáló és a visszacsinálók)	English narration	Károly Rékasi	Ferenc Cakó adapted sand animation tale
