= Magyar vándor =

Hungarian Strayer
- Directed by: Gábor Herendi
- Written by: Gábor Harmat
- Starring: Károly Gesztesi; János Gyuriska; Gyula Bodrogi
- Music by: Róbert Hrutka
- Distributed by: Budapest Film
- Release date: 5 February 2004
- Running time: 110 minutes
- Country: Hungary
- Language: Hungarian

Magyar vándor (English: The Hungarian Strayer or Hungarian Vagabond) is a 2004 Hungarian action comedy film directed by Gábor Herendi and starring Károly Gesztesi, János Gyuriska and Gyula Bodrogi. The plot contains elements of time travel fiction.

== Plot ==
The seven leaders of the Hungarians wake up after a very hard party in Etelköz. Then they realise that their beloved Hungarians are gone without them to conquest... In this exciting movie the leaders have to find the new home, and their people as well. During their migration they live through the history of Hungary, both the comic and tragicomic episodes, but instead of forests and castles, they occupy inns and hotels, and they are fighting with harem girls instead of Mongols or Tatars. And the big battle is not with weapons and guns, but on a soccer field, with a football and two teams...

== Cast ==
- Károly Gesztesi ... Álmos
- János Gyuriska ... Előd
- János Greifenstein ... Ond
- Zoltán Seress ... Kond
- Győző Szabó ... Tas
- Tibor Szervét ... Huba
- István Hajdú ... Töhötöm
- Gyula Bodrogi ... General Wienerschnitzz
- János Gálvölgyi ... Turkish Pasha
- László Fekete ... Toldi Miklós
- András Hajós ... Singer

== Reception ==
The film was the most successful at the Hungarian box office in 2004-2005.
