= Odense International Film Festival =

Annual international film festival located in Denmark

OFF - Odense International Filmfestival
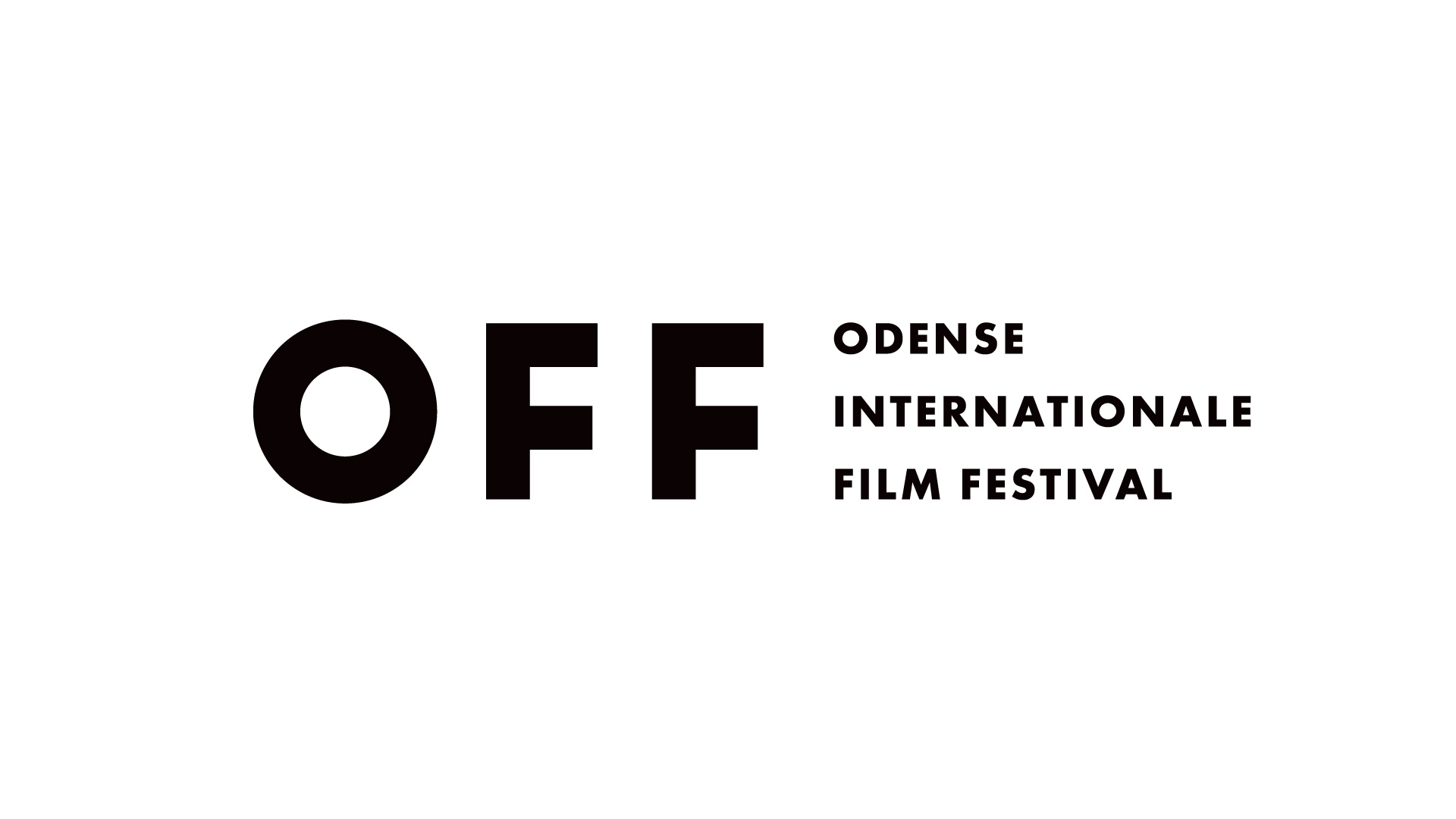
- Genre: Short films
- Dates: 1975
- Location: Odense
- Country: Denmark
- Next event: August 2026

OFF - Odense International Film Festival is an Academy Award-Qualifying, week-long short film festival in Denmark. It takes place every year in the last week of August. The festival made its debut in 1975, making OFF the eldest film festival in Denmark. OFF - Odense International Film Festival is part of the municipality of Odense.

== Overview ==
OFF - Odense International Film Festival offers a multitude of screenings, talks, workshops, debates, seminars, industry events and parties. The majority of the festival activities take place around BRANDTS, one of the leading art museums in Denmark presenting new and classic art alongside visual culture. All competition screenings are open to the public.

== Director and revitalization ==
In 2009, Birgitte Weinberger took over the festival and was given a completely new role as both head of festival as well as artistic director of the festival. Prior to this, the festival had not had an actual head of festival, but instead the managerial structure had been centered around a local administrator and an artistic director. In 2009, the organizational structure was thus strengthened with a manager that was visible and active all year round. With these managerial changes came also the introduction of the artistic profile: A high-profile artistic persona from the film industry - a person who would function as an external contributor with their personal angle to the festival program. Birgitte Weinberger coined the abbreviation OFF – Odense International Film Festival and in many aspects revitalized the whole concept in both content and expression.

== Competition ==
The competition programme consists of four central competitions: The International Competition (three awards), The Danish Competition (two awards), The Animation Competition (two awards), and The Documentary Competition (two awards). The four competitions are Academy Award, EFA, and Robert qualifying. In addition to the four central competitions, OFF has a Youth Competition and a pitching contest called Pitch Me Baby. At the end of the festival, OFF presents an Audience Award to the short film in competition that receives the most audience votes during the festival.

== See also ==
- Denmark
- Film festival
