= Gábor N. Forgács =

Hungarian film director, producer, cinematographer, and chairman

Gábor N. Forgács (born October 6, 1969) is a Hungarian film director, producer, cinematographer, and he also serves as the chairman of Parabel Filmstudio. In a career of more than two decades, he is best known for film The butterflies, a culture shock psychodrama which was released in summer 2013, at the 35th Moscow International Film Festival.

== Early life ==
Forgács was born in Budapest, Hungary. Throughout his early age he paid attention for the cinema, especially for Martin Scorsese, David Lynch and Tony Scott films. At the beginning of his career he was mentored by Vilmos Zsigmond, the Hungarian-American cinematographer of Close Encounters of the Third Kind, The Deer Hunter, The Black Dahlia.

== Education ==
After his graduation of the Hungarian Film&TV school Mafilm and the American Film Institute in Los Angeles where Forgács studied from Allen Daviau and Bill Dill (cinematographer of The Five Heartbeats), he worked as cinematographer in Daviau’s and Dill’s movies.

== Career ==
=== 1990s ===
His career began in the early 1990s when the producer was reporting wars for several international TV channels like CNN, ORF, ProSieben, Sat. Many documentaries marked under his name in the early 1990s, especially ones related to politically conflicted situations, such as John Bosco’s Rwanda which was documented during the Rwandan Civil War, or the Fish called Adolf during the Breakup of Yugoslavia. Nordmende awarded him a Commercial film tender in 1993. He directed several American and Hungarian short feature films in the late ‘90s like The Insanity Plea (1998), Mail Ordered Bride (1998), Raphael (1997), Ten Commandments (1996), Train (1994). Attributing much of his collaborative experiences to his education at the American Film Institute in Los Angeles, he has actively worked in various positions including camera assistant for Vilmos Zsigmond in Playing by Heart with Sean Connery, Angelina Jolie and Dennis Quaid, as well as camera operator in Underworld featuring Kate Beckinsale. Furthermore, he has studied from some of the best editors, like Billy Williams, the creator of Gandhi and Dean Cundey, the cinematographer of Jurassic Park. Forgacs also worked as cinematographer in a Canadian and US production, the I Spy, directed by Betty Thomas, starring Eddie Murphy and Owen Wilson.

=== 2000-present ===
At the year of 2000 he has started to produce films and TV series and creating international co-productions in his own firm, the Parabel Filmstudio. From 2003 he has been working actively in Hungary and taking part in creation of the concept of the new Hungarian Film Law. In 2004, he was representing Hungary at the Cannes Film Festival as co-creator of European film promotion’s platform Producers on the Move. He provided production services for a German production Eichmann, directed by Robert Young (2006), and for a UK/US production, The Nutcracker in 3D (2007), directed by Andrey Konchalovskiy, starring Elle Fanning, John Turturro and Nathan Lane. Forgacs started to make a film adaptation for Andrew Cooper’s novel, The house of storm in 2010. In 2011 he completed a documentary on the intoxicating Hungarian history about Countess Elizabeth Bathory, which was based on his historical research for his upcoming feature film, The beauty never dies. In 2012 Forgacs began work on a film adaptation of The Great Khmer Empire, a historical adventure film much anticipated by the whole world. He completed the animated version for the storyboard in 2013. His latest feature film, The Butterflies took almost five years to complete. The original idea was to turn it into cultural shocking psychodrama. The film was released in the summer of 2013, at the Moscow International Film Festival and other international sites.

== Commercials ==
He has directed commercial works for clients, such as McCann Erickson, Saatchi & Saatchi, Leo Burnett, Ogilvy, Grey Budapest, TBWA Planet. – He has won his first prize at 1993 in Nordmende commercial-film tender.

== Personal life ==
He currently moves among his two homes in Los Angeles and Budapest. He is dedicated to travelling and familiar with the variety of cultures in his free time.
