= Krisztina Goda =

Hungarian screenwriter and film director (born 1970)

- Born: 1968 (age 57–58); Budapest, Hungary
- Occupations: Screenwriter; Film director
- Years active: 1988–present

Krisztina Goda (born 1970) is a Hungarian screenwriter and film director. She is best known for her 2006 film Children of Glory.

== Selected filmography ==
- Just Sex and Nothing Else (2005)
- Children of Glory (2006)
- Chameleon (2008)
- Home Guards (2015)
- The Courtship (2015)
