= 33rd Moscow International Film Festival =

Russian film festival

- Festival poster
- Opening film: Transformers: Dark of the Moon
- Closing film: The Debt
- Location: Moscow, Russia
- Founded: 1959
- Awards: Golden George (The Waves)
- No. of films: 37 Films (In Competition); 151 Films (Out of Competition); 38 (Short Films); 18 Films (In Tributes and Honors)
- Festival date: 23 June – 2 July 2011
- Website: Website

The 33rd Moscow International Film Festival was held from 23 June to 2 July 2011. The Golden George was awarded to the Spanish drama film The Waves directed by Alberto Morais.

The festival opened with Transformers: Dark of the Moon directed by Michael Bay. The festival honoured Helen Mirren with Stanislavsky Award and closed with her film The Debt directed by John Madden.

== Jury ==
=== Main Competition Jury ===
The members of main competition jury:

- Geraldine Chaplin (United States, United Kingdom) - Chairman of the Jury
- Amos Gitai (Israel)
- Nikolai Dostal (Russian)
- Károly Makk (Hungary)
- Javier Martin Dominguez (Spain)

=== "Perspectives" Competition Jury ===
The members of "Perspectives" Competition Jury:

- Miroljub Vuckovic (Serbia) - Chairman of the Jury
- Alexander Kott (Russian)
- Ermek Shinarbayev (Kazakhstan)

=== Documentary competition Jury ===
The members of Documentary competition Jury:

- Michael Apted (United Kingdom)
- Tue Steen Müller (Denmark)
- Alexander Gutman (Russian)

== Films in competition ==
The following films were selected for the main competition:

English title	Original title	Director(s)	Production country
Return	Visszatérés	Judit Elek	Hungary, Romania, Sweden
Waves	Las Olas	Alberto Morais	Spain
The Other Family	La Otra familia	Gustavo Loza	Mexico
Name of the devil	W imieniu diabła	Barbara Sass	Poland
Joanna	Joanna	Feliks Falk	Poland
Sneakers	Ketsove	Ivan Vladimirov and Valeri Yordanov	Bulgaria
The Perfect Life	La Vita Facile	Lucio Pellegrini	Italy
Revenge: A Love Story	Fùchóu zhě zhī sǐ	Wong Ching-po	Hong Kong
I Can Not Live Without You	Ushenod mgoni movkvdebi	Levan Tutberidze	Georgia
Montevideo, God Bless You!	Montevideo, Bog te video	Dragan Bjelogrlić	Serbia
Postcard	Ichimai no hagaki	Kaneto Shindo	Japan
American Translation	American Translation	Pascal Arnold and Jean-Marc Barr	France
Heart's Boomerang	Serdtsa bumerang	Nicholas Khomeriki	Russia
Tabu: The Soul Is a Stranger on Earth	Tabu - Es ist die Seele ein Fremdes auf Erden	Christoph Stark	Austria, Germany, Luxembourg
Leaving	Odcházení	Václav Havel	Czech Republic
Chapiteau Show	Chapiteau-show	Sergei Loban	Russia
The escalation	Escalade	Charlotte Silvera	France, Spain

The following films were selected for the Perspectives competition:

English title	Original title	Director(s)	Production country
Tape End	Tape End	Ludwig Wüst	Austria
Anarchy in Zhirmunai	Anarchija Žirmūnuose	Saulius Drunga	Lithuania, Hungary
Bugs	BUGgY	Andrew Bogatirev	Russia
Gakku	Gakku	Gaziz Nasyrov	Kazakhstan
The House under the Water	Khaneye zire âb	Sepideh Farsi	Morocco, Germany, the Netherlands, Iran, France
Liao Wai	Lao Wai	Fabienne Gaillard	China
My Sex Life	Viaţa mea sexuală	Cornel Popa Jorge	Romania
Undercurrent	Brim	Árni Ólafur Ásgeirsson	Iceland
Secret Objects	Samoolui bimil	Lee Young Mi	South Korea
Snowy child	Snowchild	Uta Arning	Germany, Japan, Singapore
The Barrens	The Steppes	Rob Nilsson	USA
Street jew	Rue Huvelin	Munir Maasri	Lebanon
Hour ago	Hora menos	Frank Spano	Venezuela, Spain, Brazil

The following films were selected for the Documentary competition:

English title	Original title	Director(s)	Production country
Hell and Back Again	Hell and Back Again	Danfung Dennis	USA
Evening country	Abendland	Nikolaus Geyrhalter	Austria
Marathon Boy	Marathon Boy	Gemma Atwal	Britain, India, United States
Ramin	Ramin	Audrius Stonys	Latvia, Georgia, Lithuania
Senna	Senna	Asif Kapadia	Britain, France
Happy People: A Year in the Taiga	Happy People: A Year in the Taiga	Werner Herzog and Dmitry Vasiukov	Germany
Czech Dream	Český sen	Vít Klusák and Filip Remunda	Czech Republic, United Kingdom

== Non-Competing Programmes ==
=== 8 ½ Films ===
- Carlos directed by Olivier Assayas
- Lozhkovilka directed by Yasbir Singh Ghuman Jr.
- Melancholia directed by Lars von Trier
- The Mill and the Cross directed by Lech Majewski
- Once Upon a Time in Anatolia directed by Nuri Bilge Ceylan
- Neds directed by Peter Mullan
- Pina directed by Wim Wenders
- Black Venus directed by Abdellatif Kechiche
- Walk away Renée directed by Jonathan Caouette

=== Werner Herzog, The Adventurer ===
- Aguirre, the Wrath of God
- The White Diamond
- Woyzeck
- Cobra Verde
- The Enigma of Kaspar Hauser
- My Son, My Son, What Have Ye Done?
- Cave of Forgotten Dreams
- Bad Lieutenant: Port of Call New Orleans
- Heart of Glass
- Stroszek
- Where the Green Ants Dream
- Fitzcarraldo

=== Sam Peckinpah ===
- The Ballad of Cable Hogue
- The Wild Bunch
- Convoy
- Major Dundee
- Junior Bonner
- The Getaway
- Bring Me the Head of Alfredo Garcia
- Pat Garrett and Billy the Kid
- Ride the High Country
- Straw Dogs
- The Killer Elite

=== Wild Nights ===
- Love.net directed by Ilian Djevelekov
- Michael directed by Markus Schleinzer
- Bedevilled directed by Jang Cheol-soo
- 6 Days on Earth directed by Varo Venturi
- I Saw the Devil directed by Kim Jee-woon

=== Gala ===
- Arrietty directed by Hiromasa Yonebayashi
- The Artist directed by Michel Hazanavicius
- The Beaver directed by Jodie Foster
- Vallanzasca – Gli angeli del male directed by Michele Placido
- Mishen directed by Alexander Zeldovich
- Five brides directed by Karen Hovhannisyan

The festival also included Italian cinema today, Media Forum, New wave, Russian Film Program, Films of world cinema (showcasing films which contains elements of Russian culture), Free Thought, Made in Spain and Short Films Corner.

== Tributes and Honors ==
=== Helen Mirren ===
Helen Mirren was honored at the festival and four of her films were screened at the festival, including the festival's closing night film The Debt.

- The Tempest directed by Julie Taymor
- The Queen directed by Stephen Frears
- The Last Station directed by Michael Hoffman

=== Rob Nilsson ===
The festival paid Tribute to American film director Rob Nilsson and screened four of his films at the festival.

- Heat and Sunlight
- Northern Lights
- Need
- Imbued

=== Béla Tarr ===
The festival paid Tribute to Hungarian film director Béla Tarr.

- Szabadgyalog / The Outsider
- Werckmeister harmóniák / Werckmeister Harmonies
- Panelkapcsolat / The Prefab People
- Macbeth
- Őszi almanach / Autumn Almanac
- Kárhozat / Damnation
- Sátántangó / Satan's Tango
- Családi tűzfészek / Family Nest
- A torinói ló / The Turin Horse
- A londoni férfi / The Man from London

== Awards ==
The winners at the festival:

- Golden George: The Waves by Alberto Morais
- Special Jury Prize: Silver George: Chapiteau Show by Sergei Loban
- Silver George:
  - Best Director: Wong Ching-po for Revenge: A Love Story
  - Best Actor: Carlos Álvarez-Nóvoa for The Waves
  - Best Actress: Urszula Grabowska for Joanna
  - Jury Special Mention: Ivan Vladimirov and Valeri Yordanov for Sneakers
  - Best film of the Perspective competition: Anarchy in Zhirmunai by Saulius Drunga
  - Special mention of the jury: Bugs by Andrew Bogatirev
  - Best film of the documentary competition: Hell and Back Again by Danfung Dennis
- Lifetime Achievement Award: John Malkovich
- Stanislavsky Award: Helen Mirren
- People's Choice Award: Montevideo, God Bless You! by Dragan Bjelogrlić
