= 37th Locarno Film Festival =

Film festival in Locarno, Switzerland

- Opening film: Broadway Danny Rose directed by Woody Allen
- Closing film: A Star Is Born directed by George Cukor
- Location: Locarno, Switzerland
- Founded: 1946
- Awards: Golden Leopard: Stranger Than Paradise directed by Jim Jarmusch
- Artistic director: David Strieff
- Festival date: Opening: 10 August 1984; Closing: 19 August 1984
- Website: LFF

Locarno Film Festival
- 38th 36th

The 37th Locarno Film Festival was held from 10 to 19 August 1984 in Locarno, Switzerland. For the first time in the history of the festival, the President of the Swiss Confederation, leader of Switzerland, attended the festival. Other notable attendees included writer Patricia Highsmith, actor John Hurt and ambassadors from Italy and India. This was considered the highest attended Locarno festival to date, with an unofficial estimate of 50,000 attendees. This was great news to organizers who had scheduled the festival a week later than usual to avoid competition from the television broadcast of the Olympics.

The Grande Piazza open-air theater was upgraded with a Dolby audio system and the opening film was Broadway Danny Rose. The closing film was the 1954 A Star Is Born directed by George Cukor.

The festival did not have a week dedicated to a Nation's cinema this year as the spot was filled by the reissue of Hitchcock films and the "Silesian Tetralogy" from Kazimierz Kutz with the final film having its world premiere on the Grande Piazza screen at Locarno.

The Golden Leopard, the festival's top prize, was awarded to Stranger Than Paradise directed by Jim Jarmusch.

== Official Sections ==
The following films were screened in these sections:

=== Main Competition ===
==== Feature films ====
Feature Films In Competition - Main Program
| Original Title | English Title | Director(s) | Production Country |
|---|---|---|---|
| Campo Europa | | Pierre Maillard | Switzerland |
| Der Gemeindepräsident | The Mayor | Bernard Giger | Switzerland |
| Donauwalzer | Waltz's of the Danube | Xaver Schwarzenberger | Austria |
| Jenstchina U Tchetvero Ieieu Moujtchine | A Woman and Her Four Men | Algimantas Puipa | Russia |
| Kaltes Fieber | Cold Fever | Joseph Rusnak | Germany |
| L'Air Du Crime | The Air of Crime | Alain Klarer | Switzerland |
| L'Etat De Crise | The State of Crisis | Mamad Haghighat | France, Germany |
| Le Roi De La Chine | The King of China | Fabrice Cazeneuve | France |
| Noites Do Sertão | Backland Nights | Carlos Alberto Prates Correia | Brazil |
| Notti E Nebbie | Nights and Mists | Marco Tullio Gordana | Italy |
| Nunca Fomos Tão Felizes Nunca | Happier Than Ever | Murillo Salles | Brazil |
| Stranger Than Paradise | | Jim Jarmusch | USA |
| The Terence Davies Trilogy | | Terence Davies | Great Britain |
| Tiznao | | Salvador Bonet, Dominique Cassuto de Bonet | Venezuela |
| Öszi Almanach | Almanac of Fall | Béla Tarr | Hungary |

==== Television Movies ====
TV-Movies In Competition - Main Program
| Original Title | English Title | Director(s) | Production Country |
|---|---|---|---|
| Bali | | Istvan Szabo | Germany |
| Edwin | | Rodney Bennet | Great Britain |
| Gubijin-So | Yu Bi-Soo | Katsumi Ohyma | Japan |
| Journey Into The Shadows | | Anna Benson Gyles | Great Britain |
| Le Chien De Jerusalem | Jerusalem's Dog | Fabio Carpi Carpi | France |
| Orfaos Da Terra | Earth Orphans | Paulo Alfonso Grisoli | Brazil |
| Paolo E Francesca | Paolo and Francesca | Vittorio De Sisti | Italy |
| Saigon: Year Of The Cat | | Stephen Frears | Great Britain |
| Something About Amelia | | Randa Haines | USA |
| The Aerodrome | | Giles Foster | Great Britain |
| The Cafeteria | | Amram Nowak | USA |
| The Dollmaker | | Daniel Petrie | USA |
| The Killing Floor | | William Duke | USA |
| The Wedding | | Gordon Flemying | Great Britain |
| The Wooden Leg | | Maria Nicolakopoulou | Greece |
| Walter | | Stephen Frears | Great Britain |

=== Out of Competition (Fuori Concorso) ===
Feature Films Out of Competition - Main Program
| English Title | Original Title | Director(s) | Production Country |
|---|---|---|---|
| Sweet Body of Bianca | Bianca | Nanni Moretti | Italy |
| Broadway Danny Rose | | Woody Allen | USA |
| Tosca's Kiss | Il Bacio Di Tosca | Daniel Schmid | Switzerland |
| Khandhar | | Mrinal Sen | India |
| Class Relations | Klassenverhältnisse | Danièle Huillet & Jean-Marie Straub | Germany |
| The Holy Innocents | Los Santos Inocentes | Mario Camus | Spain |
| Love Streams | | John Cassavetes | USA |
| Diary for My Children | Naplo Gyrmekeimnek | Marta Meszaros | Hungary |
| Paris, Texas | | Wim Wenders | Germany, France |
| Rumble Fish | | Francis Ford Coppola | USA |
| Signal 7 | | Rob Nilsson | USA |
| Streamers | | Robert Altman | USA |

=== Special Sections ===
==== Carte Blanche to Bernardo Bertolucci ====
Carte Blanche to Bernardo Bertolucci
| English Title | Original Title | Director(s) | Year | Production Country |
|---|---|---|---|---|
| 42nd Street | | Lloyd Bacon | 1933 | USA |
| Germany, Year Zero | Germania, Anno Zero | Roberto Rossellini | 1947 | Italy |
| The Earrings of Madame de... | Madame De... | Max Ophüls | 1953 | France |
| Outskirts | Okraina | Boris Barnet | 1933 | Russia |
| Sansho the Bailiff | Sansho Dayu | Kenji Mizoguchi | 1954 | Japan |

==== Retrospective - Lux-Film ====
Retrospective Lux-Film 1934-1954, Aesthetics And System of An Italian Studio
| Original title | English title | Director(s) | Year | Production country |
|---|---|---|---|---|
| Abbasso La Miseria | Down the Misery | Gennaro Righelli | 1945 | Italy |
| Anna | | Alberto Lattuada | 1951 | Italy |
| Bambini In Città | Children in the City | Luigi Comencini | 1947 | Italy |
| Barboni | Bums | Dino Risi | 1946 | Italy |
| Carosello Napoletano | Neapolitan Carousel | Ettore Giannini | 1953 | Italy |
| Don Bosco | | Goffredo Alessandrini | | Italy |
| Due Milioni Per Un Sorriso | Two Million for a Smile | Carlo Borghesio, Mario Soldati | 1939 | Italy |
| Giorno Di Nozze | Wedding Day | Raffaello Matarazzo | 1942 | Italy |
| Gioventù Perduta | Lost Youth | Pietro Germi | 1947 | Italy |
| Il Bandito | The Bandit | Alberto Lattuada | 1946 | Italy |
| Il Cavagliere Misterioso | The Mysterious Knight | Riccardo Freda | 1948 | Italy |
| Il Mercato Delle Facce | The Faces Market | Valerio Zurlini | 1952 | Italy |
| L'Imperatore Di Capri | The Emperor of Capri | Luigi Comencini | 1949 | Italy |
| La Corona Di Ferro | The Iron Crown | Alessandro Blasetti | 1940 | Italy |
| Malombra | On a Malom | Mario Soldati | 1942 | Italy |
| Mio Figlio Professore | My Son Professor | Renato Castellani | 1946 | Italy |
| Miss Italy | | Duilio Coletti | 1949 | Italy |
| Nettezza Urbana | Urban Neatness | Michelangelo Antonioni | 1948 | Italy |
| Non C'È Pace Tra Gli Ulivi | There is No Peace among the Olive Trees | Giuseppe De Santis | 1950 | Italy |
| Proibito Rubare | Forbidden to Steal | Luigi Comencini | 1948 | Italy |
| Riso Amaro | Bitter Rice | Giuseppe De Santis | 1949 | Italy |
| Ulisse | | Mario Camerini | 1953 | India |
| Un Americano In Vacanza | An American on Vacation | Luigi Zampa | 1945 | Italy |
| Una Lezione Di Geometria | A Geometry Lesson | Virginio Sabel | 1948 | Italy |
| Una Storia D'Amore | A Love Story | Mario Camerini | 1942 | Italy |
| Zazâ | | Renato Castellani | 1942 | Italy |

=== Special Program ===
Special Program
| Original title | English title | Director(s) | Year | Production country |
|---|---|---|---|---|
| A Star Is Born | | George Cukor | 1954 | USA |
| Banker Margayya | Banker Architade | T.S. Nagabharana | | India |
| Die Letzte Chance | The Last Chance | Léopold Lindtberg | 1945 | Switzerland |
| Drescze | Sweaty | Wojciech Marczewski | 1981 | Poland |
| Le Soldat Qui Dort | The Sleeping Soldier | Jean-Louis Benoit | | France, Switzerland |
| Nightsongs | | Marva Nabili | | USA |
| The Boy With The Green Hair | | Joseph Losey | 1948 | USA |
| Venido A Menos | Come less | Alejandro Azzano | | Argentina |

==== Alfred Hitchcock ====
Alfred Hitchcock 1899-1980
| Original title | English title | Director(s) | Year | Production country |
|---|---|---|---|---|
| The Man Who Knew Too Much | | Alfred Hitchcock | 1955 | USA |
| The Rope | | Alfred Hitchcock | 1948 | USA |
| The Trouble With Harry | | Alfred Hitchcock | 1956 | USA |
| Vertigo | | Alfred Hitchcock | 1958 | USA |

==== Kazimierz Kutz's Silesian Tetralogy ====
Kazimierz Kutz's Silesian Tetralogy
| Original title | English title | Director(s) | Year | Production country |
|---|---|---|---|---|
| Na Strazy Swej Stac Bede | I Shall Always Stand Guard | Kazimierz Kutz | 1983 | Poland |
| Paciorki Jednego Rozanca | The Beads of One Rosary | Kazimierz Kutz | 1980 | Poland |
| Perla W Koronie | Pearls in the Crown | Kazimierz Kutz | 1972 | Poland |
| Sol Ziemi Czarnej | Salt of the Black Earth | Kazimierz Kutz | 1969 | Poland |

== Parallel Sections ==
The following films were screened in these sections:

=== Film Critics Week ===
FIPRESCI - International Federation of Film Critics Week
| Original title | English title | Director(s) | Production country |
|---|---|---|---|
| Ardh Satya | | Govind Nihalani | India |
| Dorado (One Way) | | Reinhard Münster | Germany |
| Hasta Cierto Punto | Up to a Point | Tomás Gutiérrez Alea | Cuba |
| Künnyü Testi Sertes | Light Bodily Pork | György Szomias | Hungary |
| Martha Dubronski | | Beat Kuert | Switzerland |
| Memorias Do Carcere | Memories Do Carcere | Nelson Pereira dos Santos | Brazil |

=== Swiss Information ===
Swiss Information - Feature Films
| Original title | English title | Director(s) | Production country |
|---|---|---|---|
| Er Moretto: Von Liebe Leben | He Moretto: Live of Love | Simon Bischoff | Switzerland |
| Glut | | Thomas Koerfer | Switzerland |
| Haus Im Süden | House in the South | Sebastian C. Schroeder | Switzerland |
| Hunderennen | Dog Racing | Bernard Safarik | Switzerland |
| Le Rapt (La Separation Des Races) | Rapstile (Separation of Breeds) | Pierre Koralnik, Jacques Probst | Switzerland |
| Lieber Vater | Dear Father | Heinz Rodde | Switzerland |
| Mann Ohne Gedächtnis | Man without Memory | Kurt Gloor | Switzerland |
| Prenom Carmen | PRESS NAME CARMEN | Jean-Luc Godard | Switzerland |
| Robert Frank (L'Immagine Della Poesia) | Robert Frank (the Image of Poetry) | Giampiero Tartagni | Switzerland |
| Teddy Baer | | Rolf Lyssy | Switzerland |
Swiss Information - Short And Medium-Length Films
| Beatrice | | Michel Rodde | Switzerland |
| Erdzeichen, Menschenzeichen | Earth Sign, Human Sign | | Switzerland |
| Flughafen | Airport | Claudio Moser | Switzerland |
| Mongolia | | Peter Volkart | Switzerland |
| Sunset At 7.30 P.M. | | Hans Glanzmann | Switzerland |
| White Noise | | Franz Walser | Switzerland |
Swiss Information - Short And Medium-Length Films - Quickfilm Presents
| Au Menu Ce Soir | On the Menu Tonight | Frédéric Maire | Switzerland |
| Hep Taxi | | Bernard Theubet | Switzerland |

== Official Awards ==
=== International Jury ===
- Golden Leopard: STRANGER THAN PARADISE directed by Jim Jarmusch
- Silver Leopard: LE ROI DE LA CHINE directed by Fabrice Cazeneuve
- Bronze Leopard: DONAUWALZER directed by Xaver Schwarzenberger, NUNCA FAMOS TÅO FELIZES directed by Murillo Salles, ALMANAC OF FALL directed by Béla Tarr
- Special Mention, Official Jury: CAMPO EUROPA directed by Patrice Cologne
