= The Outsider (1981 film) =

- Hungarian poster
- Directed by: Béla Tarr
- Written by: Béla Tarr
- Starring: András Szabó; Jolan Fodor
- Cinematography: Barna Mihók; Ferenc Pap
- Edited by: Ágnes Hranitzky
- Music by: András Szabó
- Production company: Mafilm
- Release date: 1981
- Running time: 122 minutes
- Country: Hungary
- Language: Hungarian

The Outsider (Hungarian: Szabadgyalog) is a 1981 Hungarian drama film directed by Béla Tarr, edited by Ágnes Hranitzky who also worked as Tarr's directorial collaborator., starring András Szabó and Jolán Fodor. It tells the story of a talented but irresponsible violinist who ruins his marriage with his drinking and antisocial behaviour.

== Cast ==
- András Szabó as András
- Jolán Fodor as Kata
- Imre Donkó as Csotesz
- István Bolla as Balázs
- Ferenc Jánossy as Painter
- Imre Vass as Worker

== Themes ==
Béla Tarr has described the film as a reaction against the political situation and the conventions of Hungarian cinema: "There were a lot of shit things in the cinema, a lot of lies. We weren't knocking at the door, we just beat it down. We were coming with some fresh, new, true, real things. We just wanted to show the reality - anti-movies."

== Reception ==
Adam Bingham wrote in the 2011 book Directory of World Cinema: "Before he became a celebrated cinematic poet of the existential—a director apt to invoke all manner of cosmic portents in detailing the downtrodden lives of alienated men in purgatory and damnation—Béla Tarr made his name in Hungary for a series of thematically-linked, discursively-inflected dramas of domestic conflict and antagonism that observe at close quarters the progressive disintegration of a family unit. Szabadgyalog/The Outsider is arguably the most significant of the three; certainly it is the most prescient in that its protagonist (a disaffected and alienated musician named András, played by András Szabó, who also composed the music for the film) looks forward to the later condemned and tormented souls of Kárhozat/Damnation (1987), Werckmeister harmóniák/Werckmeister Harmonies (2000) and The Man from London (2007), even if Tarr's eye here is rather more focused on the naturalistic than stylized, on close-up, eye-level observation as opposed to distanced and protracted examinations of figures in portentous, dilapidated landscapes. ... Tarr wastes none of his time, using the protracted scenes and objective style in order to allow the audience to study the characters and see a human face given to a rich, complex problem that covers philosophical as well as sociological questions."
