= Ágnes Hranitzky =

Hungarian film editor and director (born 1945)

- Hranitzky Ágnes
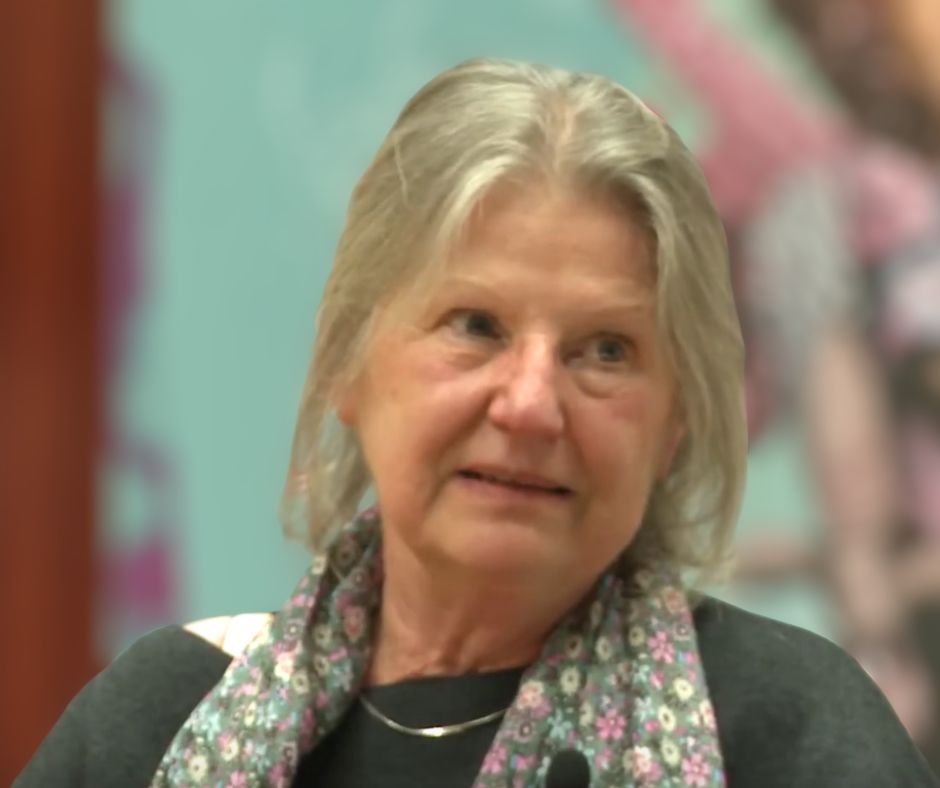
- Ágnes Hranitzky in 2017
- Born: 1945 (age 80–81); Derecske, Hungary
- Education: Academy of Theatre and Film Arts
- Occupations: Film editor, film director
- Years active: 1960s–present
- Known for: Long-term creative collaboration with Béla Tarr
- Awards: Béla Balázs Award; Knight's Cross of the Order of Merit of Hungary

Ágnes Hranitzky (born 1945 in Derecske, Hungary) is a Hungarian film editor and film director. She is best known for her long-standing creative collaboration with Béla Tarr, first as editor and later as credited co-director on several of Tarr's major feature films. Over several decades, Hranitzky's work as editor, co-director and close creative collaborator played a central role in shaping the distinctive visual rhythm, temporal structure and long-take form associated with Tarr's cinema.

Hranitzky received the Knight's Cross of the Order of Merit of the Republic of Hungary in 2006 and the Béla Balázs Award in 2009. In 2011, The Turin Horse, which she co-directed with Tarr, won the Jury Grand Prix Silver Bear and the FIPRESCI Prize at the Berlin International Film Festival.

== Early life and education ==
Hranitzky was born in Derecske, Hungary, in 1945. She studied film editing at the Academy of Theatre and Film Arts in Budapest, attending the evening film-editing class between 1967 and 1970.

== Film career ==
Hranitzky began her career in the Hungarian film industry in the mid-1960s as an assistant editor, contributing to productions such as the films Patyolat akció (1965), Háry János (1965), and Miklós Jancsó's Szegénylegények (The Round-Up, 1966). She advanced to the role of full editor in the early 1970s, working on various Hungarian television movies, shorts, and other projects, including Hajlékot embernek (1972), Az utolsó tánctanár (1975), and Dübörgő csend (1978). By the late 1970s, she had edited additional shorts such as Cinemarxisme (1979) and Tékozló nélkülözés (1979), as well as Harcmodor (1980), building her professional experience within the Hungarian film sector during this formative period. This early work as an editor preceded her long-term collaboration with director Béla Tarr, which began in 1981.

Hranitzky first worked with Tarr as editor of The Outsider (1981). From that point onward she became Tarr's principal editor and one of his closest creative collaborators. A filmography in András Bálint Kovács's monograph The Cinema of Béla Tarr: The Circle Closes lists Hranitzky across Tarr's major works from The Outsider through The Turin Horse, including credits as editor, co-author, co-director and directorial collaborator depending on the film.

The significance of Hranitzky's role is closely connected with the formal structure of Tarr's mature films. Tarr's later work is known for very long takes, slow camera movement and precisely choreographed scenes. In such a working method, editing was not only a matter of post-production: questions of rhythm, duration, camera movement, staging and the relation between shots had to be considered during shooting itself. Criterion's essay on Werckmeister Harmonies describes Hranitzky as Tarr's longtime editor and co-director from Werckmeister Harmonies through The Turin Horse, and notes that in Tarr's long-take cinema the editing process begins on set, as the choreography of camera and actors is developed.

Hranitzky's editing approach emphasized precision and restraint, as she has stated: "The important thing is to know where not to cut." Tarr has described their process as deeply integrated, noting that cutting decisions were often determined during shooting with Hranitzky present on set to assess scene rhythm and transitions via video monitor. Tarr himself described Hranitzky's contribution as inseparable from the making of the films. In a 2017 interview, he explained that because the structure and rhythm of the films were formed during shooting, Hranitzky was present on set, followed the takes on a monitor and contributed to decisions that could not later be corrected at the editing table. Tarr added that there was "no decision without her", and that this was why she deserved co-director status.

From Kárhozat (Damnation, 1988) onward, Tarr and Hranitzky's mature films were shaped by a recurring creative team. The National Film Institute Hungary identifies Damnation as a film in which the major collaborators of Tarr's later work were already present, including Nobel Prize-winning writer László Krasznahorkai, editor Ágnes Hranitzky, composer Mihály Víg, set and costume designer Gyula Pauer and cinematographer Gábor Medvigy. Hranitzky continued to edit and shape these films through Sátántangó (1994), Werckmeister Harmonies (2000), The Man from London (2007) and The Turin Horse (2011).

Beginning with Werckmeister Harmonies, Hranitzky was widely credited as co-director on Tarr's later feature films. Filmportal.de lists Werckmeister Harmonies with both Béla Tarr and Ágnes Hranitzky as directors, and also credits Hranitzky for editing. The D'A Film Festival describes her as the editor of almost all of Tarr's films and as co-director of some of his most emblematic feature films, including Werckmeister Harmonies and The Turin Horse.

In 2007, Hranitzky co-directed The Man from London, adapted from the novel by Georges Simenon. The film was selected for the official competition at the 2007 Cannes Film Festival, where the festival credits list Hranitzky as editor. Kovács's filmography lists Hranitzky as co-director and editor of the film, and also credits her as one of its set designers.

In 2011, Hranitzky again worked as editor and co-director on The Turin Horse, Tarr's final feature film. The film premiered at the 61st Berlin International Film Festival, where it won the Jury Grand Prix Silver Bear and the FIPRESCI Prize. Filmportal.de lists Hranitzky as co-director and editor of The Turin Horse, while the Karlovy Vary International Film Festival describes Tarr's permanent team as including Hranitzky as partner, co-director and editor.

== Style and creative role ==
Hranitzky's work is closely associated with Tarr's mature long-take style. In conventional filmmaking, editing is often primarily associated with the selection and arrangement of shots after filming. In Tarr and Hranitzky's later films, however, the unusually long takes meant that many editorial decisions had to be anticipated before and during the shoot. The timing of a pan, the duration of a walk, the rhythm of a camera movement, the entrance and exit of actors and the relation between one shot and the next all formed part of the editorial structure of the film before the material reached the editing room.

Because of this method, Hranitzky's work as editor extended into the construction of the films' temporal and spatial form. Tarr's own explanation of her presence on set emphasised precisely this point: the structure and rhythm were created during filming, and later correction would often have been impossible. Her co-director credits on Werckmeister Harmonies, The Man from London and The Turin Horse reflected this unusually integrated role in the making of the films.

== Selected filmography ==
=== Work with Béla Tarr ===
- The Outsider (Szabadgyalog, 1981), editor
- The Prefab People (Panelkapcsolat, 1982), editor and co-author
- Macbeth (1982), scriptwriter with Béla Tarr and directorial consultant
- Almanac of Fall (Őszi almanach, 1984), editor and co-author
- Kárhozat (Damnation, 1988), editor and co-author
- The Last Boat (Az utolsó hajó, 1989), editor and co-author
- Sátántangó (1994), editor and co-author
- Journey on the Plain (Utazás az Alföldön, 1995), co-author
- Werckmeister Harmonies (Werckmeister harmóniák, 2000), editor and co-director
- Prologue (2004), episode of Visions of Europe, co-director
- The Man from London (A londoni férfi, 2007), editor, co-director
- The Turin Horse (A torinói ló, 2011), editor and co-director and set designer

=== Other editing and film work ===
- Az utolsó tánctanár (The Last Dance Teacher, 1975), editor
- Segesvár (1976), editor
- Dübörgő csend (Rumbling Silence, 1978), editor
- Harcmodor (1980), editor
- Anna (1981), editor
- Töredék (2007), editor

=== Early assistant-editor and production credits ===
- A helység kalapácsa (1965), production work
- Háry János (1965), assistant editor
- The Round-Up (Szegénylegények, 1966), assistant editor
- Patyolat akció (1966), assistant editor
- Harlekin és szerelmese (1967), assistant editor

== Awards and honours ==
- 2006 – Knight's Cross of the Order of Merit of the Republic of Hungary, civil division, awarded to Hranitzky as a film editor.
- 2009 – Béla Balázs Award, awarded to Hranitzky as an editor.
- 2011 – The Turin Horse, co-directed by Béla Tarr and Ágnes Hranitzky, won the Jury Grand Prix Silver Bear and the FIPRESCI Prize at the Berlin International Film Festival.
- 2026 – Gyarmathy Lívia Award for Outstanding Film Artist, awarded on the Day of Hungarian Film by Hungarian film professional organisations to filmmakers with a significant filmography and outstanding professional work.
- 2026 – Lifetime Achievement Award of the Hungarian Society of Film and Video Editors.

== Personal life ==
Hranitzky was Béla Tarr's long-term partner in life and work; their relationship lasted for 48 years, from 1978 until Tarr's death in 2026. In a 2001 profile of Tarr, The Guardian described Tarr and Hranitzky as partners of more than twenty years and noted that Hranitzky had edited all of his films. Hungarian film sources have also described Hranitzky as Tarr's long-term companion in work and life, and as the editor whom Tarr regarded as co-director of his films.
