= Macbeth (1982 film) =

1982 Hungarian film directed by Béla Tarr

- Based on: Macbeth by William Shakespeare
- Screenplay by: Béla Tarr
- Directed by: Béla Tarr
- Starring: György Cserhalmi; Erzsébet Kútvölgyi; Ferenc Bencze; Imre Csuja; János Derzsi; István Dégi; Pál Hetényi; Tamás Jordán; Attila Kaszás; Gyula Maár; Đoko Rosić; József Ruszt; Géza Rácz; János Ács; Lajos Őze
- Music by: András Szabó
- Country of origin: Hungary
- Original language: Hungarian

Production
- Cinematography: Buda Gulyás; Ferenc Papp
- Editor: Ágnes Hranitzky
- Running time: 62 minutes

Original release
- Network: Magyar Televízió
- Release: 16 March 1982

Macbeth is a 1982 Hungarian television film adapted, edited and directed by Béla Tarr. György Cserhalmi stars Macbeth while Erzsébet Kútvölgyi portrays Lady Macbeth. The film is composed of only two shots: The first (before the main title) is five minutes long, the second 57 minutes long.

Considered to be a watershed in the filmmaker's artistic development, the film was among examples of Tarr's work screened at the Museum of Modern Art during a retrospective in October 2001. It has also been screened during a retrospective at the 33rd Moscow International Film Festival.

== Bibliography ==
- "Macbeth". British Universities Film and Video Council. n.d.
- Meade, Fionn; Tarr, Béla (2007). "Béla Tarr". BOMB (100). New Art Publications: 34–39. ISSN 0743-3204. JSTOR 40427881.
- "2011 :: Moscow International Film Festival". 2011.
- "Film Exhibitions". MoMA. 4 (8). The Museum of Modern Art: 15–26. 2001. ISSN 0893-0279. JSTOR 4420628.
- Rapfogel, Jared (2006). "Review: Family Nest by Béla Tarr; The Outsider by Béla Tarr; The Prefab People by Béla Tarr". Cinéaste. 31 (2): 62–64. ISSN 0009-7004. JSTOR 41689978.
