= The Man from London =

2007 film by Béla Tarr and Ágnes Hranitzky

- Theatrical release poster
- Directed by: Béla Tarr; Ágnes Hranitzky
- Screenplay by: Béla Tarr; László Krasznahorkai
- Based on: L'homme de Londres by Georges Simenon
- Produced by: Humbert Balsan; Christoph Hahnheiser; Juliusz Kossakowski (executive producer); Lajos Szakacsi
- Starring: Miroslav Krobot; Tilda Swinton; Janos Derzsi; Istvan Lenart; Erika Bók
- Cinematography: Fred Kelemen
- Edited by: Ágnes Hranitzky
- Music by: Mihály Vig
- Production companies: 13 Production; Black Forest Films; Cinema Soleil; TT Filmmuhely; Von Vietinghoff Filmproduktion
- Distributed by: Fortissimo Films; Artificial Eye; IFC Films
- Release date: 23 May 2007 (2007 Cannes Film Festival)
- Running time: 139 minutes
- Countries: Hungary; France; Germany
- Languages: English; French
- Budget: €4.3 million

The Man from London (Hungarian: A londoni férfi) is a 2007 Hungarian film directed by Béla Tarr and Ágnes Hranitzky. It is an adaptation by Tarr and his collaborator-friend László Krasznahorkai of the 1934 novel L'Homme de Londres by prolific Belgian writer Georges Simenon. The film features an international ensemble cast including Czech actor Miroslav Krobot, Briton Tilda Swinton, and Hungarian actors János Derzsi and István Lénárt. The plot follows Maloin, a nondescript railway worker who recovers a briefcase containing a significant amount of money from the scene of a murder of which he is the only witness. Wracked by guilt and fear of being discovered, Maloin sinks into despondence and frustration, which leads to acrimony in his household. Meanwhile, an English police detective investigates the disappearance of the money and the unscrupulous characters connected to the crime.

The French, German and Hungarian co-production of the film was fraught with difficulty and obstacles. The first of these was the suicide of the film's French producer, Humbert Balsan in February 2005, days before shooting was due to begin. As the original financing of the film collapsed, the remaining producers managed to secure stop-gap funding which allowed them to shoot nine days of footage on the expensive Corsican sets, until they were shut down through legal action by the local subcontractor. After many expressions of support from European film organisations, production companies and government bodies, a new co-production contract was signed in July 2005 with a revised budget and shooting schedule. It then emerged that all rights to the film had been ceded to a French bank under the original production agreement, and only after further changes in the film's backers was a deal struck with the bank to allow shooting to resume in March 2006, over a year later than had been originally envisaged.

The Man from London was the first of Tarr's films to premiere in competition at the Cannes Film Festival, but despite being highly anticipated, it won no prize. The French distributor blamed this on poor dubbing and a late showing, though the press was put off by the film's extended shots and leaden pace. After being re-dubbed, it was shown on the international film festival circuit.

Critical reception to The Man from London was generally positive, though less adamant than that of the director's previous two works; while reviewers spoke in glowing terms of the formidable cinematography and meticulous composition, they felt the film lacked compelling characters. Variety reviewer Derek Elley commented that the film was unlikely to reconcile the division between viewers of Tarr's films who find the director to be "either a visionary genius or a crashing bore".

== Plot ==
The film concerns a middle-aged railway pointsman, Maloin (Miroslav Krobot), who lives in a decrepit apartment in a port town with his highly-strung wife Camélia (Tilda Swinton) and his daughter Henriette (Erika Bók). One night while in his viewing tower at the port's rail terminus, Maloin witnesses a fight on the dockside. One of the shady combatants is knocked into the water along with the briefcase he carries; when the other flees the dark quayside, Maloin makes a clandestine descent from the tower and retrieves the briefcase, which he finds full of sodden English banknotes. Maloin conceals the money and tells no-one of what he has seen. The next morning, he visits a tavern where he plays chess with the barkeep (Gyula Pauer). On his way home, he stops by the butcher's where his daughter works, and finds to his indignation that they have her washing the floor. Later, from the window of his apartment, he notices Brown (János Derzsi) watching him from below. At dinner, Maloin is increasingly irascible, addressing Henriette brusquely and arguing with Camélia. Meanwhile, Brown searches the water at the dock's edge without success before noticing the watchtower overlooking the quayside, and Maloin within.

Later at the tavern, a police inspector from London named Morrison (István Lénárt) discusses with Brown the matter of the stolen money. Morrison claims to be working on behalf of a theater owner named Mitchell, a theatre owner from whose office safe the £55,000 was stolen. Morrison proposes that Brown, being intimately familiar with Mitchell's office, is the only man he knows who was capable of making away with the money without raising alarm. Morrison indicates that Mitchell cares only that the money is returned swiftly, and is even prepared to offer a two nights' theater takings in exchange. When Morrison mentions having visited Brown's wife and asks what he should tell Mitchell, Brown leaves the room under a pretense and slips out a side door. Nearby playing chess with the barkeep, Maloin has overheard the conversation.

Maloin calls to the butcher's and drags Henriette from the store against her will and over the protestations of the butcher's wife (Kati Lázár). He brings her to the tavern for a drink, where he overhears the barkeep telling another patron the story of Brown's meeting with the inspector, revealing that Morrison had called the local police when Brown absconded. Though Henriette refuses her drink, Maloin buys her an expensive mink stole. They return home to the consternation of Camélia, who cannot comprehend why Maloin has ruined Henriette's chances of a job and spent what little savings the family had on the extravagant stole. During Maloin's shift the next night he is visited by Morrison, who questions him as to the previous night's events as the body of the drowned man is retrieved from the quayside below.

The next day at the tavern, Morrison meets Brown's wife (Agi Szirtes), and tells her that Brown is under suspicion for the theft and for the murder at the quayside. He asks for her help in finding him and repeats to her Mitchell's offer to Brown, but she remains silent. At home, Henriette tells Maloin she found a man in their hut at the seaside, and in fear locked the door and ran home. An agitated Maloin tells her not to tell anyone, and leaves for the hut. He unlocks the door, and receiving no response to his calling Brown's name, steps inside, closing the door behind. Minutes later he re-emerges, breathing heavily. After pausing to compose himself, he locks the door and leaves. In the next scene, Maloin presents the briefcase to Morrison in the tavern, and asks him to arrest him, confessing to having killed Brown an hour ago. Morrison leaves with Maloin for the hut, dismissing the frenzied inquiries of Brown's wife about her husband and handing the briefcase to the barkeep on the way out. Brown's wife follows the men to the hut, and emerges weeping with Morrison moments later. Back at the tavern, Morrison prepares two envelopes with a small portion of the recovered money in each. One he leaves with the grieving widow to whom he apologizes and wishes well, while the other he gives to Maloin, telling him that his case was one of self-defense. As he is preparing to leave, Morrison advises Maloin to go home and forget the whole affair. The camera focuses on the expressionless face of Brown's wife momentarily before fading to white.

== Cast ==
- Miroslav Krobot as Maloin
- Tilda Swinton as Maloin's wife
- Erika Bók as Henriette
- János Derzsi as Brown
- Ági Szirtes as Mrs. Brown
- István Lénárt as The Inspector
- Kati Lázár as Henriette's boss
- Gyula Pauer as The Innkeeper

== Analysis ==
According to critic Martha P. Nochimson, the film is an exploration of the place of anonymous breakdowns of social order in personal life. For the most part, questions of justice operate in the background of The Man From London, which foregrounds the perceptions and point of view of an accidental witness to the murder, who, like the viewer, has no connection with anyone involved. The film principally concerns the texture of the world of the protagonist Maloin as he experiences it first hand: fog, light, shadow, skin, walls, floors, windows, sounds. These are much closer to Maloin than any broken laws involving strangers as in the killing at the dock. As distinct from the trope of crime functioning as a break from the boredom of the mundane for the Hitchcockian ordinary man "excitingly" caught up in it, the interjection of crime in the lives of the characters of The Man from London is a phantom occurrence for those burrowed into the center of the mundane details of their lives. In other words, Tarr's film suggests the possibility that it is only on an abstract plane that murder committed by and on strangers causes a stir and demands an investigation. In this context, it is fitting that the investigation must be undertaken by a stranger, the man from London, since abstraction entails distancing from an enveloping context. Only the appearance of the man from London, Brown, impels Maloin to struggle with his de facto alienation, as an ordinary man, from moral principle, an alienation linked, counterintuitively, to the absence of desire in his daily grind.

== Background ==
Director Béla Tarr and novelist-screenwriter László Krasznahorkai had been collaborators since making Damnation in 1987. With The Man from London, they sought to adapt the 1934 French language novel L'Homme de Londres by the Belgian writer Georges Simenon. The novel had been twice adapted for film previously; as The London Man by Henri Decoin in 1943, and as Temptation Harbour by Lance Comfort in 1947 with William Hartnell, Robert Newton, and Simone Simon in the lead roles. The Man from London was something of a departure from the social realism of the collaborators' preceding films, as the characters exemplify no social classes and the film focuses on their internal and interrelational dynamics rather than their environment. Tarr explained that he had been drawn to adapt the novel because "it deals with the eternal and the everyday at one and the same time. It deals with the cosmic and the realistic, the divine and the human, and to my mind, contains the totality of nature and man, just as it contains their pettiness." It was the first of the director's films not to feature the Hungarian language or an Eastern European setting. The ensemble cast of the film included Czech Miroslav Krobot, Briton Tilda Swinton, and the Hungarians János Derzsi and István Lénárt. Tarr shared directorial credit with Ágnes Hranitzky – the film's editor and his long-time collaborator.

== Production history ==
The development of the film was problematic, with threats to shut down the production, lack of financing, and ultimately a return to work. The project first faltered in February 2005, when the film's producer Humbert Balsan committed suicide. Tarr reported receiving word of his producer's death two days before shooting was scheduled to begin in Bastia, Corsica. Balsan's death led to significant financial difficulties for the production. The film had been established as a co-production with French, German and Hungarian financing. Tarr's Budapest-based production company T. T. Filmműhely were to provide the Hungarian funding for the project, while Balsan had secured the French and German financing for the film by warranting a loan from the French bank Coficiné. Upon learning of his death, the bank withdrew its support for the production, which was then postponed.

So this is where we are at this moment. The agreement with Ognon and Coficiné has been concluded, the signed contract has been submitted to the court in Paris and we shall soon start shooting the film which is now relieved from the burden of the past.

We sincerely hope that the descent to hell and the humiliation is over, finally we can switch off the light in the projection hall, and we can see what it was all about after all.

Because what is made ready from this shooting of half an hour or so is something that makes all of us burst with pride!

— Press release by director Béla Tarr and producer Gábor Téni, February 6, 2006.

After securing additional financing from Eurimages and ARTE, Tarr used these and the Hungarian funds to undertake nine days of shooting on sets he had built at a cost of €2 million. The French funding was cross-financed for the shoot by T. T. Filmműhely. As funds were frozen however, the Corsican subcontractor Tanit Films (controlled by the film's then-executive producer Jean-Patrick Costantini), terminated their contract with Balsan and through legal action compelled the production to dismantle the sets and leave the shooting location. At that point, Ognon Pictures shut the production down and disassociated themselves from the film, and Tarr withdrew to Hungary to regroup.

Expressions of sympathy and solidarity from the European film community manifested in renewed assurances of continued support from the production's German partners, ARTE, and the French National Film Centre (whose support was conditional on the film having 51% of its dialogue in French). New French financing was secured from production company Mezzanine Film, and in Hungary, the Hungarian Motion Picture Foundation (MMKA) and the Minister of Culture pledged to back the production if a guarantee could be made that the film would be finished safely. A compromise filming schedule was negotiated whereby a quarter of the shoot would take place in Eastern Europe rather than Corsica and fewer shooting days would be allotted. This allowed the original €5 million budget to be reduced by €700,000 to the amount available. With the funding promises secured and a revised shooting schedule, the film's producers forged a new co-production contract in July 2005.

While the production's lawyers worked to clarify its legal standing in the Summer of 2005, it emerged that Humbert Balsan's deeply indebted production company Ognon Pictures had pledged all rights to the production to Coficiné in exchange for loans. With production in legal stasis and faced with a lengthy court battle to recover the rights, the producers agreed to a settlement with Ognon's bankruptcy officer. In the meantime, the French partners Mezzanine Film declared their discomfort with the scale of the production, and after mutual agreement with the producers, left the project on September 5, 2005. After meeting with the producers and their new French partner, Paul Saadoun of 13 Production, Coficiné consented to completing the film. On February 6, 2006, Tarr and producer Gábor Téni issued a press release which documented at length the developments with the troubled production to that date, and expressed their hope and intent to persevere in completing the film. Tarr duly restarted shooting in March 2006, after a year of inactivity. The filmmakers dedicated The Man from London to their late colleague Humbert Balsan.

== Release ==
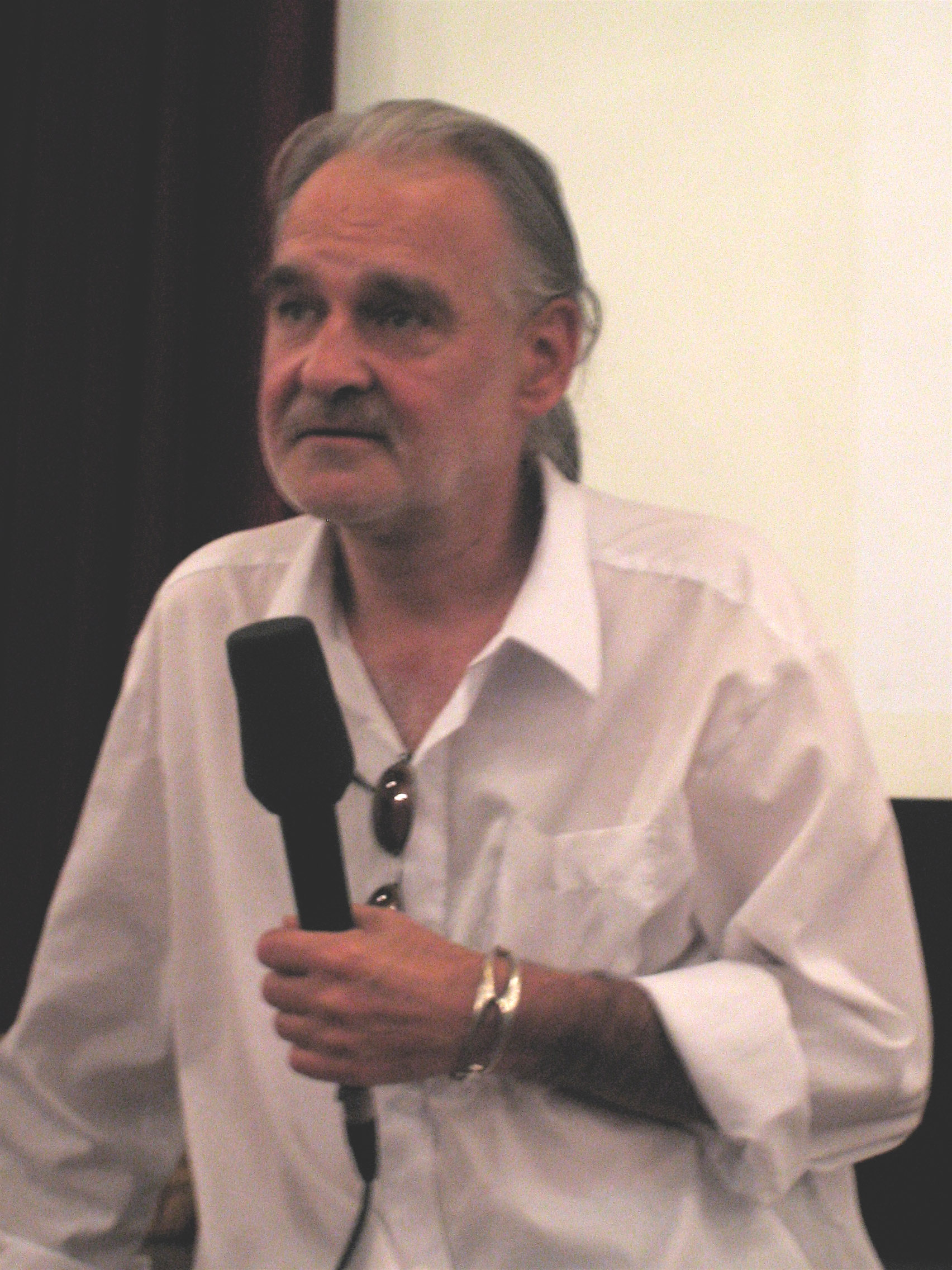
Director Béla Tarr at the Sarajevo Film Festival showing of the film.

The Man from London premiered in competition at the 2007 Cannes Film Festival, Tarr's first film to do so. Although its showing was highly anticipated, the slow pace and prolonged shots of the film "had the press fleeing like panicked slaughterhouse cattle" as The New York Times put it, and it won no prize. This failure was attributed by the film's French distributor Shellac to its late showing and the poor quality of the dubbing. A proposal for the film to open the Hungarian Film Week out of competition had previously been rejected by the festival's board. Following its Cannes appearance, the film was screened at the film festivals of Toronto, Melbourne, Edinburgh, Split, Vancouver and New York. It proved controversial in New York, where elements of the audience reacted favourably when the film appeared to end prematurely due to a technical fault; others greeted the actual conclusion with fervent applause and calls of bravo.

Global sales rights to the film were bought by Fortissimo Films, and it was re-dubbed in French and English. The new version had its North American premiere at the Museum of Modern Art in New York City in September 2008. In the United Kingdom, distributor Artificial Eye released the film theatrically in December 2008, 18 months following its Cannes premiere. They later released a DVD box set of Tarr's films which collected The Man from London with Damnation (1988) and Werckmeister Harmonies (2000). In the United States the film was given a limited release in May 2009 by IFC Films, who later made it available through video-on-demand.

== Critical reception ==
Critical reaction to The Man from London generally praised its formalist aesthetic and painstakingly composed scenes, while criticizing its slow pace and lack of a compelling plot. Most argued the film fell short of Tarr's previous efforts. Variety's Derek Elley rated the film on a par with his Damnation (1988) but as inferior to Sátántangó (1994) and Werckmeister Harmonies (2000), remarking it was improbable that The Man From London would put an end to the polarization of Tarr's audiences into those who hail him as a director of "visionary genius" and those for whom he is a "crashing bore". Martin Tsai of The New York Sun allowed that Tarr "makes it easy for viewers to get lost in his beautifully bleak world and lose track of time" but complained that in comparison with its predecessors, the film's central theme of guilt seemed insubstantial and the film itself felt "slight and incomplete".

The New York Times reviewer Nathan Lee described The Man from London as "bloated, formalist art", and an "outrageously stylized, conceptually demanding film" that dehumanizes and alienates its audience. Conversely, Jeff Reichert of Reverse Shot, a long-time Tarr enthusiast, commended the film for its technical dexterity and authoritative camera movement, comparing Tarr to Taiwanese director Hou Hsiao-hsien for his cinematic rigor. He did, however, consider the source material sub-par, and the musical score by Mihály Víg to be "whirring [and] grat[ing]". In The Hollywood Reporter, Kirk Honeycutt complimented the intricacy of the cinematography and the monochrome photography, but judged the film to be "tedious", "repetitive" and "nearly unwatchable". In a review of Cannes' offerings for Time Out, Dave Calhoun too drew attention to the meticulous cinematography and signature shot lengths of Tarr's "austere and mesmeric" film, and declared Swinton's dubbing into Hungarian one of the festival's strangest instances of cultural displacement.

Reporting from Cannes, The Guardian's Peter Bradshaw described the film as "bizarre and lugubrious, but mesmeric", and praised the muted performance of Agi Szirtes in the role of Brown's wife as "strangely compelling". Reviewing the film following its theatrical release, he found the dubbed dialogue affected and odd, the score doom-laden, the occasional humour mordant, and the cinematography mesmerising, remarking that net effect was "unsettling, sometimes absurd, sometimes stunning". Ed Gonzalez of The Village Voice concluded that the film "stands as an example of style for the sake of pure and intense but dispassionate style".

On the review aggregator website Rotten Tomatoes, 62% of 34 critics' reviews are positive, with an average rating of 5.9/10. The website's consensus reads: "This dark, demanding film from art-house favorite Bela Tarr is by no means a typical crime procedural, but patient viewers will find much to admire."
