= Budapest school =

Film movement

The Budapest school, or documentarism, was a Hungarian film movement that flourished from roughly 1972 to 1984. The movement originated from Béla Balázs Studios, a small-budget filmmaking community that aimed to unite the young avant-garde and underground filmmakers of Hungary and give them an opportunity to make experimental works without state censorship. The Balázs studio gave birth to two main movements in the early 1970s: an experimental, avant-garde group (led by individuals like Gábor Bódy), and the documentarist group, whose main goal was the portrayal of absolute social-reality on screen. This movement was called "Budapest school" by an Italian film critic on a European film festival. Soon they adopted this name.

The main founders and leaders of the group were István Dárday, Györgyi Szalai, Judit Ember and Pál Schiffer. Many young and sometimes amateur artists were invited to the group by fellow filmmakers, especially Béla Tarr, who made his debut film at the age of 22 with financing from the Béla Balázs Studio.

Films of the movement were generally (but not always) shot with amateur equipment, mostly hand-held cameras, and usually by two or more cameras at the same time. Non-professional actors, who usually socially resembled their characters, were cast. These films also avoided pre-written scripts, with only a basic scenario and certain plot elements pre-written, and the cast members' reactions improvised on the set. Most films were shot in a very short period of time with a very limited budget or no budget at all. Their central themes were mostly the lives of working class and poor people in urban Hungary and their struggle to have a decent existence. The main goal of the movement was to show absolute reality on screen instead of the false escapism shown by commercial and mainstream films.

The Budapest school movement closely resembled cinema verité. The first full-length film made in this manner was Jutalomutazás ("The Prize Trip") (1975) by István Dárday and Györgyi Szalai. The best-known example of the movement is "Családi tűzfészek" ("Family Nest") (1979) by Béla Tarr.
