= Sátántangó =

1994 film by Béla Tarr

- 2019 re-release poster
- Directed by: Béla Tarr
- Screenplay by: László Krasznahorkai; Béla Tarr
- Story by: Mihály Vig; Péter Dobai; Barna Mihók
- Based on: Satantango (1985 novel) by László Krasznahorkai
- Produced by: György Fehér; Joachim von Vietinghoff; Ruth Waldburger
- Starring: Mihály Víg; Putyi Horváth; Miklós B. Székely; Erika Bók; László feLugossy
- Cinematography: Gábor Medvigy
- Edited by: Ágnes Hranitzky
- Music by: Mihály Víg
- Production company: Mozgókép Innovációs Társulás és Alapítvány; Von Vietinghoff Filmproduktion; Vega Film; Magyar Televízió; Télévision Suisse Romande
- Distributed by: MOKÉP (Hungary)
- Release dates: 8 February 1994 (Hungarian Film Festival); 28 April 1994 (Hungary)
- Running time: 439 minutes
- Countries: Hungary; Germany; Switzerland
- Language: Hungarian

Sátántangó (Hungarian: [ˈʃaːtaːntɒŋɡoː], also known in English as Satan's Tango) is a 1994 Hungarian black-and-white epic drama film directed by Béla Tarr, co-written by Tarr and László Krasznahorkai, and edited by Ágnes Hranitzky. Hranitzky is also listed in András Bálint Kovács's filmography as Tarr's directorial collaborator on the film. Running for more than seven hours, it is based on the 1985 novel by Krasznahorkai, whose works Tarr frequently adapted after his 1988 film Damnation. Tarr had hoped to make the film since 1985 but was unable to proceed with production due to the strict political environment in Hungary.

The film was an international co-production between Hungarian, German, and Swiss companies. Sátántangó has received widespread critical acclaim from film critics. In 2012, it appeared in the British Film Institute's Sight & Sound critics' top 50 films.

== Plot ==
In a desolate Hungarian village, after the collapse of a collective farm, two people, Futaki and Mrs. Schmidt, are in a romantic embrace when Futaki is awakened at dawn by the ringing of church bells. Mr. Schmidt conspires with another co-worker named Kráner to steal the villagers' money and flee to another part of the country. As Futaki is sneaking out of the Schmidt home, he overhears Schmidt's plans, after which he demands to become part of the scheme—all this being watched by a lonely drunken man known as the Doctor, who writes the events down in a notebook.

The conspiracy fails when rumors spread across the village that the charismatic and manipulative Irimiás, a former co-worker who had been presumed dead, is returning with his friend Petrina. Previously, Irimiás and Petrina had been forced under threat of arrest to continue their criminal enterprise in the employ of the police captain in a nearby town. After hearing a mysterious drone in a bar and proclaiming their intent to blow everything up, they begin their march to the village. They are welcomed by their young ally Sanyi Horgos, with whom they had made a deal so that Sanyi would spread word among the villagers that the two had died.

At the village, the Doctor discovers that he has run out of fruit brandy. Unaccustomed to leaving his house, he decides to go out to buy liquor nonetheless. Outside, he is met with hostile weather and the arrival of night. He meets Sanyi's older sisters, who are prostitutes dreaming of running away to town since none of the locals have money anymore. After an impossibly long time, the doctor arrives at the local tavern to purchase his brandy, but is unable to find the courage to enter. The doctor is accosted by Estike, Sanyi's little sister, whose father hanged himself and who had previously been institutionalized. Estike causes the doctor to fall in the mud. In a state of emotional tension, after reacting angrily to this, the Doctor reconsiders and naively tries to apologize as the girl leaves and disappears in the darkness. Chasing after her, the Doctor passes out and collapses in a nearby wood, and is found in the morning by the town's conductor who takes him to a hospital.

The morning before the Doctor left his house, Estike is tricked by her older brother Sanyi into planting a "money tree" in the forest. She tortures and poisons her cat to death, and carries its corpse to the money tree, finding it dug up by her brother who has reclaimed the money. Marauding through the woods, the girl approaches the local tavern and peers through its window, where most of the villagers dance to accordion music, unaware of the peeping child. Afterwards, she encounters the Doctor and retreats into an abandoned ruin, fatally poisoning herself with the feeling that every movement of the world is preordained.

The following day, Irimiás arrives at the village while Estike's funeral is being held. Irimiás tells the villagers they were all guilty of Estike's death and talks most of them into handing him all their money in order to start a new collective in a nearby estate. The villagers (excepting the publican, Sanyi's family and the Doctor) walk together, wheeling their few belongings to a distant abandoned mansion where they lie down to sleep, whereupon the narrator describes the dreams each of them has. Meanwhile, Irimiás, Sanyi and Petrina are walking when Irimiás drops to his knees while hearing once again the mysterious drone as the fog lifts from the ruin where Estike died. They later meet with an accomplice in a nearby town to acquire a large amount of explosives, for reasons never explicitly explained.

The next morning, when Irimiás is late, the villagers decide that they have been duped by Irimiás, and fight among themselves. Schmidt and Kráner accuse Futaki of having led them into this trap and demand that he return their money. As they beat him up, Irimiás arrives, scolds them for their squabbling and tells them that his plan to establish a new farm has been delayed by the authorities and that their only hope is to scatter around the country for an unspecified amount of time. Kráner demands that Irimiás give their money back. Irimiás does so, but expresses his disappointment at their lack of trust and unreliability, shaming Kráner into once more giving his money to him. Irimiás, Petrina and Sanyi drive the villagers and their belongings by truck to the city, where Irimiás assigns the Schmidts, the Kráners and the Halicses different towns and different tasks, gives them each 1,000 forints and dismisses them. Futaki, however, tells Irimiás that he would rather find a job as a watchman, takes his thousand forints and leaves on his own. The fate of the headmaster remains unclear.

The police receive Irimiás' devastating report about the villagers' poor abilities and defects and decide to rewrite it in a less vulgar manner before filing it away and leaving.

The Doctor returns home after thirteen days in the hospital, unaware that Irimiás has taken the entire community away with him. He sits down to write his notes, assuming that all his neighbors are snoring in their beds. He suddenly hears the same bells toll that woke Futaki at the beginning of the film. The Doctor leaves his house again to investigate the ruined church from which the sound of the bells comes, because the bell tower is not supposed to be working. He discovers a madman inside the ruins striking a bell clapper with a metal rod like a gong and shouting endlessly that the Turks are coming. Frightened, the Doctor returns home and proceeds to board up the window in front of his desk, plunging himself into total darkness as he sits and writes the narration which began the film. The tolling of church bells continues throughout the last part of the film and the displaying of the end credits.

== Cast ==
- Mihály Víg as Irimiás
- Putyi Horváth as Petrina
- László feLugossy as Schmidt
- Éva Almássy Albert as Mrs. Schmidt
- János Derzsi as Kráner
- Irén Szajki as Mrs. Kráner
- Alfréd Járai as Halics
- B. Miklós Székely as Futaki
- Erzsébet Gaál as Mrs. Halics
- Erika Bók as Estike
- Peter Berling as the Doctor
- Zoltán Kamondi as the Innkeeper
- Péter Dobai as the Police Captain
- Mihály Ráday as the voice of the narrator

== Themes ==
As with the novel upon which it is based, Sátántangó deals with strong pessimistic philosophical themes surrounding the absence of authority, the prevalence of nihilism, and the evils of indifference. The opening shot, lasting nearly eight minutes, depicts a vast herd of cows wandering in a desolate farm and then vanishing in the distance. Although the scene is largely seen as an establishment of the area and the farm's ambiance, several reviewers thought that it symbolizes the outcome of the story. In the chapter "We Are Resurrected", Irimiás and Petrina broker a deal with a Captain that will lead to the inevitable death or imprisonment of the villagers. The Captain does not appear to be comfortable with the lack of empathy and sociopathic conduct of Irimiás. For this reason, the Captain delivers an extended monologue about the importance of authority, quoting Pericles on the subjects of order and freedom. Some authors have judged the figure of the captain to represent a symbol of authoritarianism during the Hungarian People's Republic.

Regarding the film's most prominent theme, the character of Irimiás can be seen wielding a God-like influence over the villagers to the point of convincing them of doing anything and to make himself greatly feared by them. In "The News is They Are Coming", Futaki and Mr. Schmidt are forced to cut off their plans to escape with the money of the village's farm as a result of Mrs. Kráner telling them of the discovery of Irimiás' return. Futaki is seen reflecting on the character of Irimiás with great fear, saying at one point "he could turn a pile of cow shit into a castle if he wanted to." The divine influence of Irimiás is symbolized heavily throughout the film. In "Knowing Something", the Doctor catches a glimpse of Irimiás and his companions' arrival before he blacks out in the forest. In the three middle chapters, concerning Estike's death, the villagers burst into an impromptu feast at the tavern in fear of Irimiás' imminent arrival. Precisely because of their fear of him, as well as their inherent mistrust of their neighbours, they fail to see Estike in the woods outside as she first watches from a window, proceeds to cry to the Doctor for help and subsequently kills herself. Further on, Irimiás makes use of his rhetoric to persuade the villagers to hand him all of the money they had earned at the collective farm, pledging them to the guilt of Estike's death. In many scenes, Irimiás appears as a knowledgeable and worldly person capable of manipulating the villagers, but also fearful of people less naive, such as the Captain and, to an extent, Futaki. Repressed fear of true authority from Irimiás can also be seen in "Going to Heaven? Having Nightmares?", when he encounters the ruins where Estike committed suicide. While he is ignorant of the event that took place in the ruins, Irimiás nonetheless bows before them, almost instinctively, as an acknowledgement. The fact that the villagers are aware they have lost all prospects of stability, but are still willing to follow Irimiás due to his leadership, places him in the position of an archetypical False Prophet, with more Satanic traits to him than divine ones.

Similarly, the character of the Doctor wields an important symbolic side of the film's themes. Appearing as man of culture and developed interests, the old Doctor is past the point of disillusion of his village, staying indoors most of the time and behaving introvertedly. The Doctor only decides to go out after running out of brandy, and his choice is deeply regretted when he is met with hostile weather under the cover of darkness and collapses. In "The Perspective From the Front", the villagers remember they have left the Doctor in the desolate village—although he was actually in the hospital—and Futaki's suggestion is that they leave him behind "to starve." The Doctor seems to be deprived of the villagers' indifference; in spite of his hostile behavior towards Mrs. Kráner, he attempts to help Estike before she commits suicide and is disturbed enough to investigate the ringing of the bells in "The Circle Closes." Out of the entirety of the village's inhabitants, the Doctor seems to be the only one willing to accept death, as he chooses to remain in the abandoned village—perhaps to starve—rather than follow Irimiás.

== Production ==
=== Editing and collaboration ===
Sátántangó was made during the long collaboration between Béla Tarr and editor Ágnes Hranitzky. Hranitzky edited the film and is listed in András Bálint Kovács's filmography as Tarr's directorial collaborator on the project. The film was made before Hranitzky's later formal co-director credits from Werckmeister Harmonies onward.

The film's long-take structure made editing part of the film's formal design rather than only a stage of post-production. In the Tarr–Hranitzky working method, questions of rhythm, duration, camera movement and the relation between one shot and the next had to be anticipated during shooting. This gave Hranitzky's role particular importance in shaping the film's temporal structure and rhythm.

=== Structure ===
The structure of the film is based on that of the novel, which borrows, as its title suggests, from tango. The film is broken into twelve parts, and does not always move chronologically, as it follows the tango scheme of going six moves forward, then six back (hence 6 + 6 parts in total). The twelve parts are titled as follows (in the original Hungarian and in English translation):

- A hír, hogy jönnek [News of Their Coming]
- Feltámadunk [We Are Resurrected]
- Valamit tudni [To Know Something]
- A pók dolga I. [The Job of the Spider I]
- Felfeslők [Unraveling]
- A pók dolga II (Ördögcsecs, sátántangó) [The Job of the Spider II (The Devil's Tit, Satan's Tango)]
- Irimiás beszédet mond [Irimiás Gives A Speech]
- A távlat, ha szemből [The Perspective From the Front]
- Mennybe menni? Lázálmodni? [Going to Heaven? Having Nightmares?]
- A távlat, ha hátulról [The Perspective From The Rear]
- Csak a gond, a munka [Just Trouble and Work]
- A kör bezárul [The Circle Closes]

=== Long takes ===
The film is composed of long takes, a trait found frequently in Tarr's work. Tarr's adoption of this style has led many people to draw parallels between Tarr, Andrei Tarkovsky, and Theo Angelopoulos, all of whom use very long takes and let their films play out at a slow pace. According to Tarr himself, there are only roughly 150 shots in the entire film. Several shots last nearly ten minutes, such as dance sequences, during which the camera rarely moves, but we see the main characters dance and drink. Tarr has said that the cast was actually drunk during these scenes.

The opening shot, in which the camera tracks alongside a herd of cows, lasts nearly eight minutes. There are shots depicting main characters walking (and talking) for minutes at a time, unimpeded by a cut.

=== The book and the film ===
This film is based on literary sources and had a screenplay, but much of it was still improvised on set. Tarr had this to say on the subject of having a screenplay, but on his filming method in general:

No, we never use the script. We just write it for the foundations and the producers and we use it when looking for the money. The pre-production is a very simple thing. It takes always a minimum of one year. We spend a year looking all around and we see everything. We have a story but I think the story is only a little part of the whole movie.

An omniscient narrator can be heard at several points throughout the film, textually quoting parts of the novel. It also adapts every moment in the book, leaving nothing out.

=== Music ===
Mihály Víg, who plays Irimiás in the film, was Béla Tarr's film composer since working on Almanac of Fall in 1984, until the director's retirement in 2011 with the film The Turin Horse. Tarr described his collaboration with Víg, as well as that with his wife and editor Ágnes Hranitzky and cinematographer Fred Kelemen, as "collaborative filmmaking", in which each one of their individual works stands as a relevant production of its own. As with Damnation (1988) and all of Tarr's work since 1994, Sátántangó utilizes a small set of original compositions by Víg that play at strategic points of the film, to establish connections between themes or situations.

For Sátántangó, Víg composed a type of score that has been described as "carnivalesque" by Tim Brayton. It is composed of melancholic and haunting accordion themes, reminiscent of a slow and repetitive tango. The most prominent musical theme of the film is "Rain II", which is featured at most of the film's signature moments. Three tango suites play once at separate moments of the film, "Galicia" and "May I Have This Tango?" in "The Job of the Spider II"—while the villagers feast as Estike watches from outside the bar—and "Circle Dance II" after the villagers arrive at the new building that is supposed to be their farm, while the camera goes through their faces and emotions. Additionally, the unearthly sound of distant church bells plays several times throughout the film. In the 2009 compilation "Music From the Films of Béla Tarr", all of the mentioned tracks appear, and the latter is listed as "Bell I" and "Bell II."

== Release ==
It was selected for the Forum section in the 44th Berlin International Film Festival.

Sátántangó is rarely screened in theatres due to its lengthy running time. Theatres generally show the film either in two separate parts, or in its entirety with two intermissions. Tarr expressed a wish for the film to be viewed without any interruption.

The scene in "Unraveling" when Estike (Erika Bók) kills her cat led to some difficulties in getting the film shown in the United Kingdom, due to legislation protecting nonhuman animals from cruelty and the British Board of Film Classification refusing to certify such films. Tarr insisted that there was a veterinarian on the set at all times, and that the cat was under the veterinarian's supervision and was not killed.

=== Home media ===
The film has developed a cult following among certain audiences, due in part to its artistry and length, but also to its having long been unavailable on DVD. The film was only briefly out in VHS and DVD formats in the 1990s, and went out of print very quickly, initiating a period in which only bootlegs transferred from old VHS sources were available. It has since been released in a new transfer supervised by Tarr.

The film was released on Blu-ray in France on 16 September 2020 by Carlotta Films, and in the United States on 12 January 2021 by Arbelos.

=== Restoration ===
In 2019, a 4K restoration of the film premiered at the 69th Berlin International Film Festival, produced by Arbelos Films and with Tarr's approval.

== Reception ==
=== Critical response ===
Sátántangó has garnered widespread critical acclaim since its 1994 release, and grew in reputation among American art house circles following the release of the director-approved 2006 DVD from Facets Video. On the review aggregator website Rotten Tomatoes, 100% of 27 critics' reviews are positive, with an average rating of 8.8/10. Tarr's direction has been a frequent subject of praise. Ed Halter called Tarr "one of filmdom's criminally undersung geniuses"; in referencing the film's ominous and illusory tones, Halter wrote, "Tarr's overwhelmingly bleak oeuvre makes Robert Bresson seem like an upbeat party animal by comparison." In The New York Times, Manohla Dargis lauded the director's use of long takes. J. Hoberman of The Village Voice described it as "one of the great, largely unseeable movies of the last dozen years," and Jonathan Rosenbaum of the Chicago Reader has called the film his favorite of the 1990s. Susan Sontag described Sátántangó as "devastating, enthralling for every minute of its seven hours," adding she would be "glad to see it every year for the rest of [her] life."

In the 2012 Sight & Sound poll of the greatest films ever made, the film tied in the critics' poll for 36th place, with 34 critics having voted for it. In the 2022 poll, the film tied for 78th place in the critics' poll with 35 votes, and 62nd in the directors' poll with 11 votes.

=== Controversy ===
The sequences with Estike and her cat have caused much controversy following the film's release. As a real cat was used, many viewers have called into question the ethics of unsimulated animal abuse and animal welfare in film, with online comparison to other films like The Holy Mountain and Cannibal Holocaust.

In a 2019 interview with Little White Lies on the scenes, Tarr claimed that "every day in the hotel room they would do this kind of ‘turning’ game. By the end, the cat was used to this and did not care." For the shot in which the cat is poisoned, his vet gave the cat a "sleeping injection" and they filmed as it fell asleep. Further, Tarr explained that "all the cat noises you hear are samples that we found from the sound archive on the internet, because the cat was totally silent."

== See also ==
- List of longest films
- Cinema of Hungary
- List of films voted the best
