= The Prefab People =

- DVD cover
- Directed by: Béla Tarr
- Screenplay by: Béla Tarr
- Starring: Judit Pogány; Róbert Koltai
- Cinematography: Barna Mihók; Ferenc Pap
- Edited by: Ágnes Hranitzky
- Release date: December 9, 1982 (Hungary)
- Running time: 102 minutes
- Country: Hungary
- Language: Hungarian

The Prefab People (Hungarian: Panelkapcsolat) is a 1982 Hungarian black-and-white drama film directed by Béla Tarr and edited by Ágnes Hranitzky. The film earned special mention in the 1982 Locarno International Film Festival. The film has several run times (72 min., 84 min., or 102 min. depending on the version), and is shot in 35 mm.

== Plot ==
The film dissects the agonizing dissolution of a working-class marriage under the crushing weight of Communist-era hardship.

The narrative begins in medias res with a deafening, high-stakes argument: a civil engineer, Férj (Róbert Koltai), packs his belongings and abandons his distraught wife, Feleség (Judit Pogány), and their two children.

Working backward from this bitter departure, the film uses moving flashbacks to trace the tragic trajectory of a relationship slowly starved of hope. Trapped in a cramped, concrete prefabricated apartment block, the couple suffocates beneath a dual burden of relentless poverty and profound emotional isolation. While the wife is submerged in an endless cycle of exhausting domestic labor, the husband seeks intellectual escape and fleeting camaraderie with his peers. A lucrative yet isolating two-year work assignment in Romania triggers a bitter conflict over their future, ultimately culminating in a hollow, bleak compromise. Set entirely within the sterile confines of government-issued housing, Tarr and Hranitzky craft a clear-eyed autopsy of a disintegrating union and a biting, unvarnished portrait of a trapped generation.

== Production ==
The Prefab People was one of the early works in the long collaboration between Béla Tarr and Ágnes Hranitzky. Hranitzky edited the film and is listed in András Bálint Kovács's filmography as Tarr's directorial collaborator on the project. This role preceded her later formal co-director credits from Werckmeister Harmonies onward.

== Reception ==
The Prefab People received generally positive reviews from critics, and has been ranked with Tarr's best early works. Rotten Tomatoes reports a 100% approval rating from critics, based on six reviews, and an average rating of 7.5/10. Writing for Village Voice, Michael Atkinson commented “Just as despairing as his later films (and also shot in richly textured black-and-white), Tarr's early works are more feet-on-the-ground and never indulge in metaphysics. . . Prefab People is the best of them, an unrelenting, smell-the-sour-breath portrait of a blue-collar marriage dissolving under pressure from Communist-era poverty, masculine inadequacy, and restless depression. As the imploding wife, theater vet (and recently, Hungarian politician) Judit Pogány is wrenchingly convincing."

Jonathan Rosenbaum of Chicago Reader argued it was "the best of his early forays into Cassavetes-style social realism." In 2003, web-based film critic Jeremy Heilman called The Prefab People the best of [Tarr's] early works because it achieves such a degree of intimacy that its lack of ostentatious filmmaking never impedes its ability to observe its characters."
