= Erika Bodnár =

Hungarian actress (born 1948)

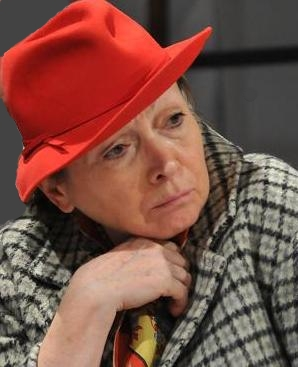
- Born: 17 March 1948 (age 78); Budapest, Hungary
- Occupation: Actress
- Years active: 1966–present

Erika Bodnár (born 17 March 1948) is a Hungarian actress. She appeared in more than fifty films since 1966.

== Selected filmography ==
Year	Title	Role	Notes
1972	Voyage with Jacob	Eszter	
1983	Night Rehearsal	Erika	
1984	Almanac of Fall	Anna	
1987	Love, Mother	Szomszédasszony	
1989	Before the Bat's Flight Is Done	Teréz (Mother)	
