= Erika Bók =

Hungarian actress

Erika Bók is a Hungarian actress who has appeared exclusively in the films of Béla Tarr.

== Filmography ==
| Year | Title | Role |
|---|---|---|
| 1994 | Sátántangó (Satan's Tango) | Estike |
| 2007 | A Londoni ferfi (The Man from London) | Henriette |
| 2011 | The Turin Horse | Ohlsdorfer's daughter |
