= Mari Tarr =

Hungarian theater director (ca.1934–2023)

Mari Tarr (1934 – 14 March 2023) was a Hungarian theater director.

== Career ==
She was born in 1934 in Klotildliget (now part of Piliscsaba). She began her career as a theatre assistant in Békéscsaba, and she moved to Budapest with her husband, Béla Tarr Sr. She was an assistant at the Madách Theatre for 55 years. She retired in January 2014. In the last years of her life, she toured the country, giving lectures entitled Tales from the Help Hole with the participation of Tamás Dunai. She also has 334 TV plays to her name as an assistant.

As a believer, she visited almost all the Marian shrines, and in 2012, she performed Ave Maria with opera singer Piroska Pándy.

She died in 2023 and was laid to rest in Pannonhalma.

== Family ==
Her husband Béla Tarr was a set designer. They had two children: Béla Tarr, film director; and György Tarr, restorer and painter.

== Awards ==
- Silver Cross of Merit of the Republic of Hungary
