= Voyage with Jacob =

- Directed by: Pál Gábor
- Written by: István Császár; Pál Gábor
- Starring: Péter Huszti
- Cinematography: János Kende
- Edited by: Éva Kármentő
- Release date: 26 October 1972
- Running time: 88 minutes
- Country: Hungary
- Language: Hungarian

Voyage with Jacob (Hungarian: Utazás Jakabbal) is a Hungarian film directed by Pál Gábor. It was released in 1972.

== Cast ==
- Péter Huszti - Fényes István
- Ion Bog - Jakab
- Éva Szabó - Kata
- Iván Szendrő - Lépes Feri
- Györgyi Andai - Emese
- Erika Bodnár - Eszter
- Ildikó Bánsági - Ildikó
- Marianna Moór
- Gabriella Borbás
- Kati Lázár
- Ágnes Hegedűs - Lépes anyja
- Eszter Vörös
- Árpád Gyenge - Tanár
- János Körmendi - Főnök
- Ferenc Paláncz - Lajos, a csapos
