= Whoops (film) =

1993 film

- HOPPÁ!
- Directed by: Gyula Maár
- Written by: Gyula Maár
- Produced by: Sándor Simó, Ödön Pál
- Starring: Mari Törőcsik, Dezső Garas
- Cinematography: János Vecsernyés
- Edited by: Zsuzsa Jámbor
- Production company: SuperPlan Film
- Release date: 12 February 1993
- Running time: 92 minutes
- Country: Hungary
- Language: Hungarian

Whoops (Hungarian: Hoppá) is a 1993 Hungarian comedy film directed by Gyula Maár. It was entered into the 43rd Berlin International Film Festival.

Elementary satire on the Hungarian regime change. Every sentence is spot on.

Even though Ede and Kati hated the previous system, they can't help themselves in the new one. In addition, a woman named Elvira turns up and tells him that she has a forty-one-year-old son, whose father is Ede.

Set in the nineties, the main characters Ede, the husband (Dezső Garas), and Kati, the wife (Mari Törőcsik), are in their sixties. They spent their youth and working years under the Kádár regime, where they were assigned the role of the "patsy", and this has not changed since the regime change. The flag still flies for the former cadre brother-in-law. Their usual daily arguments and grumbling continue as they have done for decades. Ede wants to move to the countryside to cut costs, where Kati has no desire to go and is considering divorce. Can decades of living together hold this disintegrating relationship together?

Excellent acting enriches the film.

This was the first feature film in the Hungarian feature film industry after the change of regime to be made by a private production company, SuperPlan Film. The producer and owner of the company is Ödön Pál.

== Cast ==
- Dezső Garas as Ede
- Mari Törőcsik as Kati
- Kati Lázár as Elvira
- István Avar as Jenő
- Gábor Máté as Külföldi vőlegényjelölt
- Gábor Nagy as Kati apja
- Andrea Söptei as Ede és Kati lánya
- Zoltán Varga
- Olga Beregszászi as Jelena
- János Derzsi as Gabika
- Erzsi Pártos as Mama
