= János Derzsi =

Hungarian actor

János Derzsi (born 20 April 1954 in Nyírábrány) is a Hungarian actor. He has appeared in more than eighty films since 1979. He is probably best known for his collaborations with director Béla Tarr, having appeared in six of Tarr's films between 1982 and 2011.

== Selected filmography ==
Film
Year	Title	Role	Notes
2013	The Notebook		
2011	The Turin Horse		
2007	The Man from London		
2003	A Long Weekend in Pest and Buda		
2000	Werckmeister Harmonies		
1998	Passion		
1997	Gypsy Lore		
1994	Sátántangó		
1993	Whoops		
1986	Sound Eroticism		
1984	Almanac of Fall		
1983	The Train Killer		
1982	Macbeth		
1980	Narcissus and Psyche		
