= Stanislavsky Award =

Russian film award

Stanislavsky Award (full title of the prize: "I Believe. Konstantin Stanislavski"; Russian: Верю. Константин Станиславский) is a special prize awarded since 2001 at the Moscow International Film Festival for the outstanding achievement in the career of acting and devotion to the principles of Stanislavski's school ("For Conquering the Heights of Acting and Faithfulness" as it is traditionally formulated).

== Winners ==
- 2001 — Jack Nicholson (United States)
- 2002 — Harvey Keitel (United States)
- 2003 — Fanny Ardant (France)
- 2004 — Meryl Streep (United States)
- 2005 — Jeanne Moreau (France)
- 2006 — Gérard Depardieu (France)
- 2007 — Daniel Olbrychski (Poland)
- 2008 — Isabelle Huppert (France)
- 2009 — Oleg Yankovsky (Russia), posthumously given to his son Filipp
- 2010 — Emmanuelle Béart (France)
- 2011 — Helen Mirren (United Kingdom)
- 2012 — Catherine Deneuve (France)
- 2013 — Kseniya Rappoport (Russia)
- 2014 — Inna Churikova (Russia)
- 2015 — Jacqueline Bisset (United Kingdom)
- 2016 — Marina Neyolova (Russia)
- 2017 — Michele Placido (Italy)
- 2018 — Nastassja Kinski (Germany)
- 2019 — Ralph Fiennes (United Kingdom)
- 2020 — Svetlana Kryuchkova (Russia)
- 2021 — Sergei Nikonenko (Russia)
- 2022 — Konstantin Khabensky (Russia)
- 2023 — Irina Kupchenko (Russia)
- 2024 — Yevgeny Mironov (Russia)
- 2025 — Vladimir Mashkov (Russia)
