= Gyula Maár =

Hungarian film director

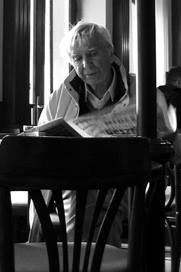
- Born: 2 August 1934; Budapest, Hungary
- Died: 20 December 2013 (aged 79); Budapest, Hungary
- Occupations: Film director, screenwriter
- Years active: 1966–2007
- Spouse: Mari Törőcsik (1973-2013) (his death) (1 child)

Gyula Maár (2 August 1934 – 20 December 2013) was a Hungarian film director and screenwriter. He directed 25 films between 1966 and 2007. His 1975 film, Mrs. Dery Where Are You? won the award for Best Actress (Mari Törőcsik) at the 1976 Cannes Film Festival. In 1986, his film Első kétszáz évem was entered into the 36th Berlin International Film Festival. In 1993, his film Whoops was entered into the 43rd Berlin International Film Festival.

== Selected filmography ==
- Mrs. Dery Where Are You? (1975)
- Macbeth (1982)
- Első kétszáz évem (1985)
- Whoops (1993)
