= Mari Törőcsik =

Hungarian actress (1935–2021)

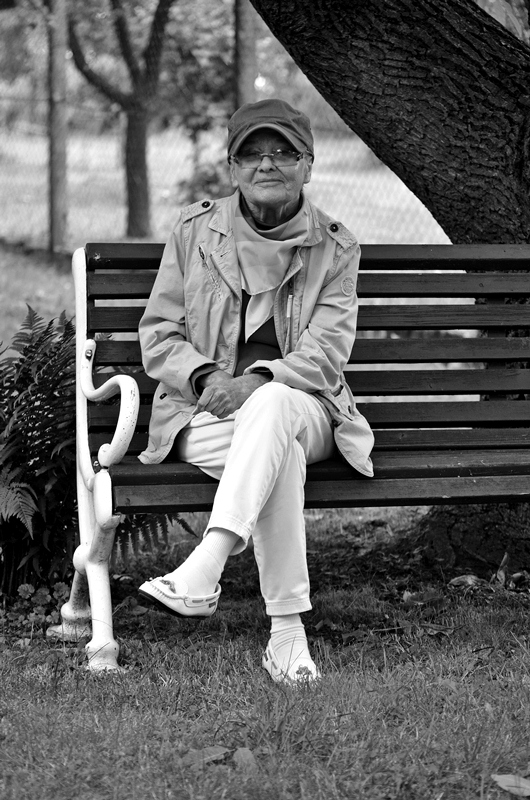
- Photo: Gáspár Stekovics
- Born: 23 November 1935; Pély, Hungary
- Died: 16 April 2021 (aged 85); Szombathely, Hungary
- Occupation: Actress
- Years active: 1954–2017
- Spouse(s): Gyula Bodrogi (1956–1964) (divorced); Gyula Maár (1973–2013) (his death) (1 child)

Mari Törőcsik (born Marián Törőcsik; 23 November 1935 – 16 April 2021) was a Hungarian stage and film actress. She appeared in more than 170 films from 1956 to 2020. She won the award for Best Actress at the 1976 Cannes Film Festival for the film Mrs. Dery Where Are You?

She died in 2021, aged 85. As per her instructions in her will, her body was cremated and the ashes were scattered in the Tisza.

== Selected filmography ==
- Merry-Go-Round (1956)
- Two Confessions (1957)
- Suburban Legend (1957)
- Iron Flower (1958)
- St. Peter's Umbrella (1958)
- Édes Anna (1959)
- Sleepless Years (1959)
- Be True Until Death (1960)
- Drama of the Lark (1963)
- And Then The Guy... (1966)
- Silence and Cry (1968)
- The Boys of Paul Street (1969)
- Those Who Wear Glasses (1969)
- Love (1971)
- Trotta (1971)
- Cats' Play (1972)
- Electra, My Love (1974)
- Mrs. Dery Where Are You? (1975)
- Forbidden Relations (1983)
- Szerencsés Dániel (1983)
- My First Two Hundred Years (1985)
- Music Box (1989)
- The Summer Guest (1992)
- Whoops (1993)
- The Outpost (1995, voice only)
- Long Twilight (1997)
- Sunshine (1999)
- A Long Weekend in Pest and Buda (2003)
- Adventure (2011)
- Swing (2014)
