= Mrs. Dery Where Are You? =

1975 film

- Film poster
- Directed by: Gyula Maár
- Written by: Gyula Maár; János Pilinszky
- Starring: Mari Törőcsik
- Cinematography: Lajos Koltai
- Edited by: György Sívó
- Release date: 16 October 1975
- Running time: 98 minutes
- Country: Hungary
- Language: Hungarian

Mrs. Dery Where Are You? (Hungarian: Déryné hol van?) is a 1975 Hungarian drama film directed by Gyula Maár. It was entered into the 1976 Cannes Film Festival, where Mari Törőcsik won the award for Best Actress, playing the protagonist Mrs. Déry.

== Cast ==
- Mari Törőcsik - Mrs. Déry
- Ferenc Kállai - Déry
- Mária Sulyok - Mother of Déry
- Imre Ráday - Intendant
- Tamás Major - Jancsó, old actor
- Cecília Esztergályos - Mrs. Schodel
- Kornél Gelley - Mr. Magyar, dilettante actor
- András Kozák - Young count
- András Schiff - Piano player
- Zsuzsa Zolnay - Mrs. Capulet
- Flóra Kádár - Nurse
