= Kati Lázár =

Hungarian actress (born 1948)

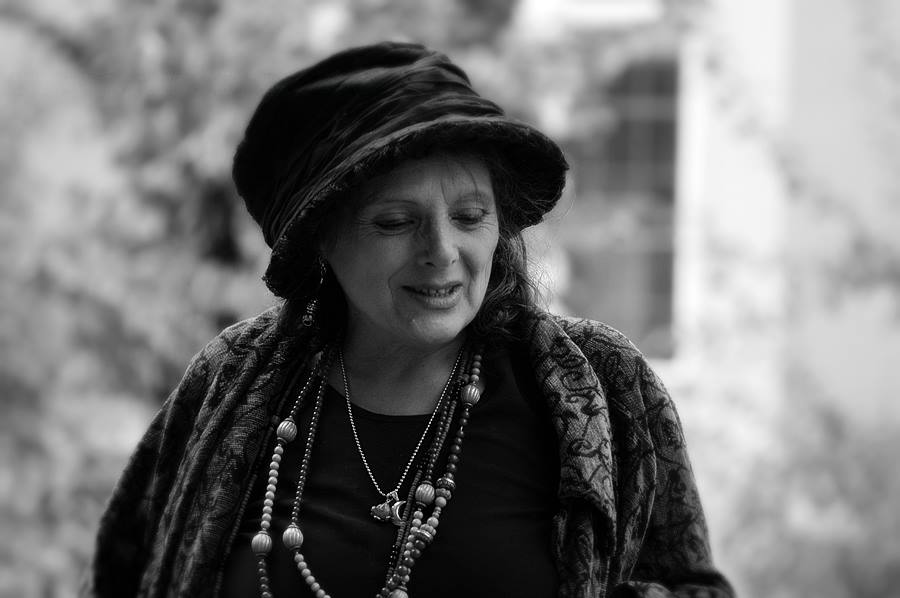
- Kati Lázár, Hungarian actress
- Born: 14 December 1948 (age 77); Oradea, Romania
- Occupation: Actress
- Years active: 1972–present

Kati Lázár (born 14 December 1948) is a Hungarian actress. She appeared in more than eighty films since 1972.

== Selected filmography ==
Year	Title	Role	Notes
1972	Voyage with Jacob		
1993	Whoops	Elvira	
2008	Virtually a Virgin	Ronaldo's mother	
