= Almanac of Fall =

1985 film

- DVD cover
- Directed by: Béla Tarr
- Written by: Béla Tarr
- Starring: Hédi Temessy, Erika Bodnár, Miklós B. Székely
- Cinematography: Buda Gulyás, Sándor Kardos & Ferenc Pap
- Edited by: Ágnes Hranitzky
- Music by: Mihály Vig
- Release dates: August 1984 (Locarno); 17 January 1985 (Hungary)
- Running time: 119 minutes
- Country: Hungary
- Language: Hungarian

Almanac of Fall (Hungarian: Őszi almanach) is a 1984 Hungarian color film directed by Béla Tarr and edited by his directorial collaborator Ágnes Hranitzky.

== Premise ==
This film is an ensemble play about five people living in an apartment. It is about the ever evolving relationships between the five characters. They do whatever is necessary to have more control over one another, but remain in the same grim, claustrophobic apartment.

The apartment is owned by Hédi, a rich elderly woman. In the story, she tells us how the number of the inhabitants increases from two (her son János and herself) to five (including her nurse, her nurse's discontented lover, and a new lodger..) They pretend to make alliances, but betray each other; they fight and at the same time try to seduce; they reveal their darkest secrets and fears while lying to each other.

== Reception ==
Almanac of Fall continues to receive positive reviews from critics, mainly for its cinematography. Rotten Tomatoes reports 100% approval among six critics, with an average rating of 8.1/10. Jonathan Rosenbaum of the Chicago Reader lauded the film's "elaborately choreographed mise en scene" and "highly unorthodox angles," while a review in Strictly Film School argues, "Tarr [...] uses highly stylized, artificially colored lighting, rigorous (and deliberate) formalism, minimalist setting, and protracted dialogue to create an atmospherically charged and disquieting environment."

Almanac of Fall has since come to be regarded as a decisive moment in Tarr's filmography, in which he abandoned the documentary-like realism of his early work and adopted a formal style of cinematography. "This is the turning point for Béla Tarr, leaving social realism behind to step into the existential abyss," wrote Jeremiah Kipp reviewing the film for Slant magazine. Jeremy Heilman of Movie Martyr called it "Tarr's first feature that could be described as the work of a formalist" and noted retrospectively that the film "offers a first sign of the hint of supernatural control that would continue to crop up in each of Tarr's subsequent features."

== Cast ==
- Hédi Temessy as Hédi
- Erika Bodnár as Anna
- Miklós B. Székely as Miklós
- Pál Hetényi as Tibor
- János Derzsi as János, Hédi fia

== Release ==
The film premiered at the 37th Locarno Film Festival in August 1984. The Curzon Artificial Eye edition of this film available in the UK is called Autumn Almanac.
