= Béla Balázs Award =

Hungarian film and TV industry award

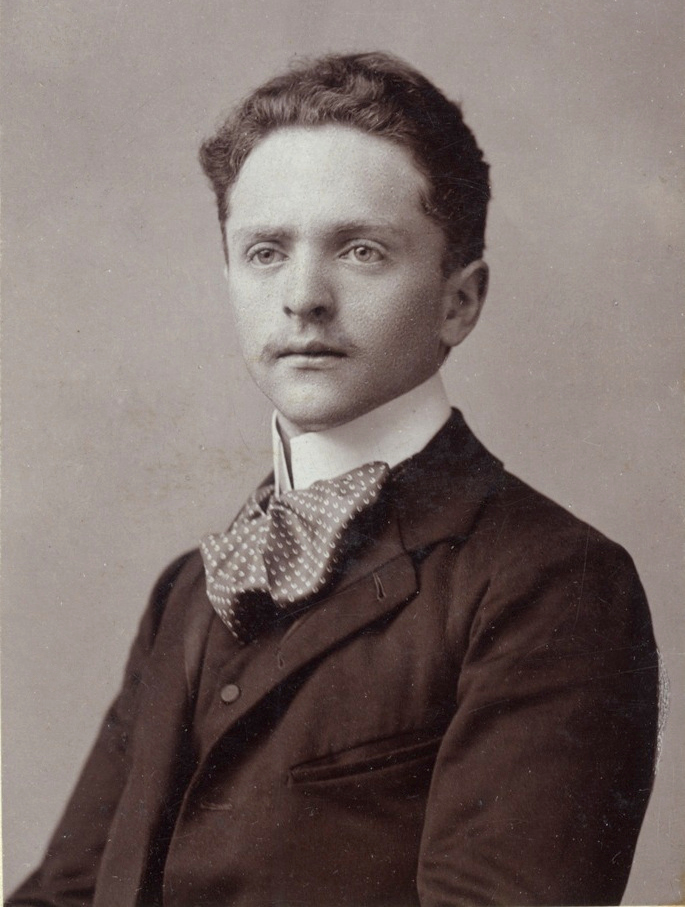
Béla Balázs is a Hungarian poet, writer, film aesthete, film director, and film college professor.

The Béla Balázs Award (Hungarian: Balázs Béla-díj) is the highest state professional award that can be awarded to filmmakers and television producers in Hungary. Named after the Hungarian film critic, aesthetician, writer, and poet Béla Balázs, who died in 1949, the award was founded in 1958. It can be awarded to those who have demonstrated outstanding creative activity in the field of motion pictures, or who have achieved outstanding artistic and scientific achievements. The prize is awarded annually by the Hungarian culture minister on March 15.

== Awarding of the prize ==
The request for ministerial recognition can be initiated by anyone - except for the candidate themselves and their immediate family - three months before the due date. The candidate's professional portfolio must also be submitted on a medium capable of playing audiovisual content. The received initiatives are evaluated by a committee invited by the minister, the president of the Hungarian Academy of Arts, and a person appointed by the minister and make a proposal for the awardees. The minister invites the members of the committee proposing the award for a period of four years, considering the proposals of the relevant professional organizations.

Since 2012, a maximum of 4 people can be awarded annually.

By convention, the award is usually given to the candidate nominated by the Hungarian Film Academy.

Award winners are given a commemorative medal with an embossed portrait of Béla Balázs.
