= Mihály Víg =

Hungarian composer and actor

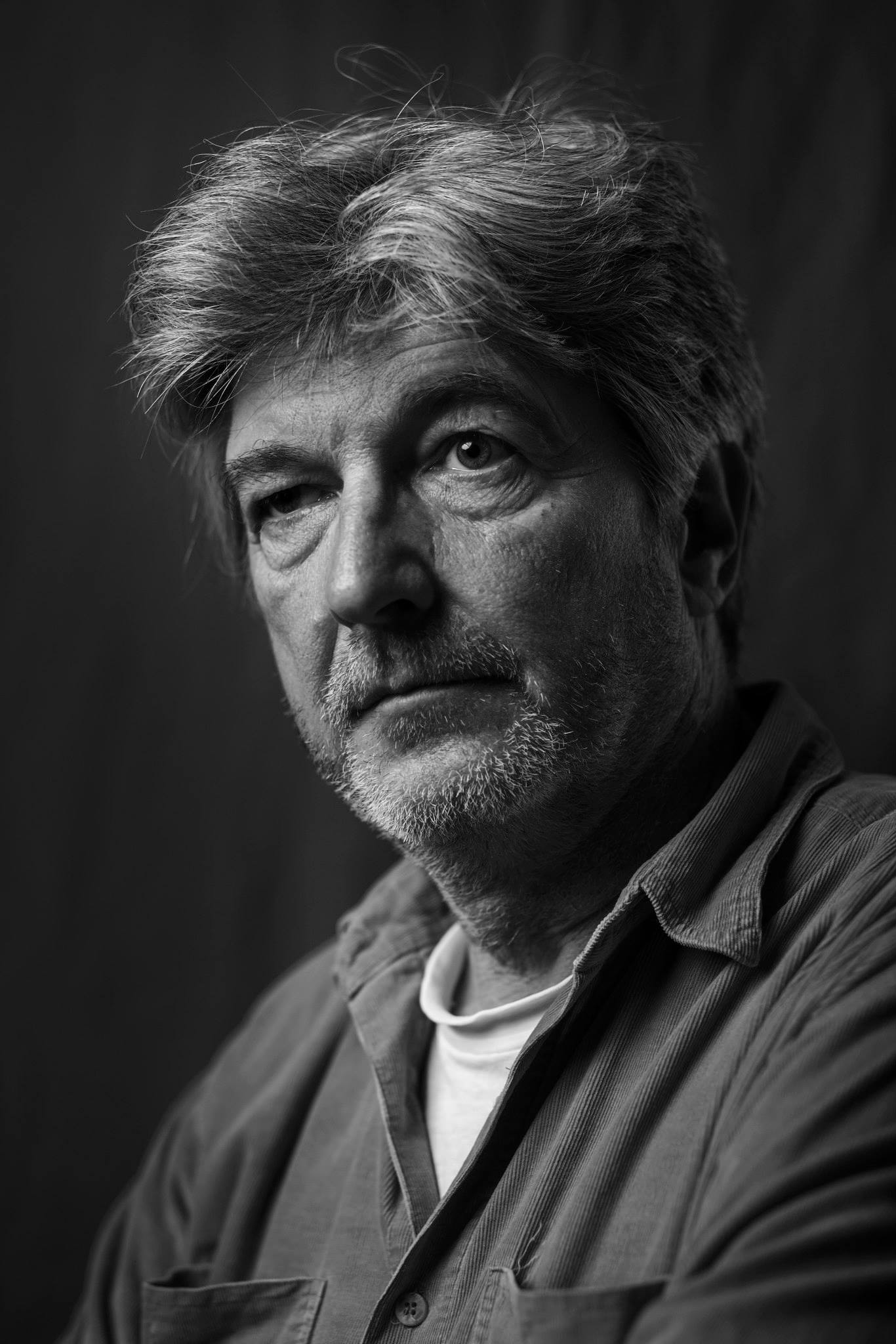

Background information
- Born: 1957 (age 68–69); Budapest, Hungary
- Occupations: Composer, poet, songwriter, guitarist, singer, actor
- Instrument: Guitar
- Member of: Balaton
- Formerly of: Trabant

Mihály Víg (born 1957, Budapest) is a Hungarian composer, poet, songwriter, guitarist, singer and actor.

== Career ==
Born into a family of musicians. He is the co-founder of bands Trabant (1980–1986) and Balaton (1979–present). Although the bands' songs were not officially released in the 1980s, they became underground hits. He composed film scores for the films of János Xantus, András Szirtes, Ildikó Szabó, Péter Müller Sziámi and Béla Tarr. He also plays the lead role - Irimiás - in the film Sátántangó. His score for the film The Turin Horse was nominated for the European Film Prize for Best Composer in 2011. He also appears in the cast of Gábor Fabricius' film Erasing Frank.

== Personal life ==
In 1986, at the invitation of Tamás Pajor, he and his wife became members of the Faith Church. After a short time he left the religious community in disappointment, but the memory of this bitter encounter stayed with him, and for a long time caused him a creative crisis. In 2020, he made serious accusations in László Bartus's book, Fesz lesz, against the congregation and personally against Sándor Németh, the leading pastor of the congregation, in connection with the loss of his wife and son.

== Awards ==
- In 2003 he was awarded the Magyar Köztársasági Érdemrend lovagkeresztje polgári tagozata (Knight of Cross from the Order of Merit of the Hungarian Republic).
- In 2008 he was awarded the Film Composer of the Year prize at the EU XXL Film Festival in Vienna.

== Filmography ==
- Eszkimó asszony fázik, (composer) 1983 (Hungarian film)
- Ex-kódex, (composer, actor) (1983) (Hungarian film)
- Őszi almanach, (composer) 1984 (Hungarian film)
- Kárhozat, (composer) 1988 (Hungarian film)
- Rocktérítő, (composer) 1988 (Hungarian film)
- Az utolsó hajó, (composer) 1990 (Hungarian film)
- Sátántangó, (composer, actor) 1994 (Hungarian film)
- Utazás az Alföldön, (composer) 1995 (Hungarian film)
- Werckmeister harmóniák, (composer) 2000 (Hungarian-German-French-Italian film drama)
- A londoni férfi, (composer) 2007 (French-German-Hungarian-English film drama)
- Saját halál, (composer) 2008 (Hungarian film)
- The Turin Horse, (composer) 2011 (Hungarian-French-German-Swiss film drama)
- Daymark (composer) 2011 (Norwegian-Hungarian film drama)
- NémetEgység @ Balatonnál - Mézföld (composer) 2011 (Hungarian film)
- A kert (composer) 2012 (Hungarian film)
- A hosszú út hazafelé (composer) 2013 (Hungarian film)
- Genezis (composer) 2018 (Hungarian film)
- Rengeteg - Mindenhol látlak (actor) 2021 (Hungarian film)
- Eltörölni Frankot (actor) 2021 (Hungarian film)

== Discography ==
- Film music from the films of Béla Tarr (2001)
- Balaton 1985. 04. 27. magnetic tape only
- Balaton II. (concert and home-made recordings, 1992)
- A fény közepe a sötétség kapujában (1996)
- 1979-2009 (compilation, 2009)
- 1987.03.27 - Inota (concert recording)

== Bibliography ==
Versek és novellák (versek, dalszövegek, novellák, forgatókönyvek, színdarabok; Bahia Music Kiadó, Budapest, 1996
