= Nunca Fomos tão Felizes =

Nunca Fomos Tão Felizes
- Directed by: Murilo Salles
- Written by: Alcione Araújo; Jorge Durán; Álvaro Ramos (uncredited)
- Based on: Alguma Coisa Urgentemente; João Gilberto Noll
- Produced by: Murilo Salles
- Starring: Claudio Marzo; Susana Vieira
- Cinematography: José Tadeu Ribeiro
- Distributed by: Embrafilme
- Release date: August 28, 1984
- Running time: 91 minutes
- Country: Brazil
- Language: Portuguese

Nunca Fomos tão Felizes (English: We've never been so happy) is a 1984 Brazilian film directed by Murilo Salles.

== Synopsis ==
We've Never Been So Happy tells the story of a father's relationship with his son, an unknown and mysterious man. A tense thriller, it is considered by critics as a milestone of Brazilian cinema.

== Cast ==
- Claudio Marzo ... Beto
- Roberto Bataglin ... Gabriel
- Susana Vieira ... Dª. Leonor
- Meiry Vieira ... Prostituta
- Ênio Santos ... Priest Rector
- Antônio Pompêo ... Hot dog seller
- Marcus Vinícius ... father
- Fábio Junqueira ... police officer
- Ângela Rebello ... Prostitute
- Emily Combeçau
- José Mayer ... police officer
- Tonico Pereira ... police officer
- Marcelo França ... police officer

== Awards ==
1984: Festival de Brasília

1. Best Picture (won)
2. Best Editing (Vera Freire) (won)

1984: Gramado Film Festival

1. Best Screenplay (Alcione Araújo) (won)

1984: Locarno International Film Festival

1. Ernest Artaria Award (Murilo Salles) (won)
