= Béla Tarr =

Hungarian filmmaker (1955–2026)

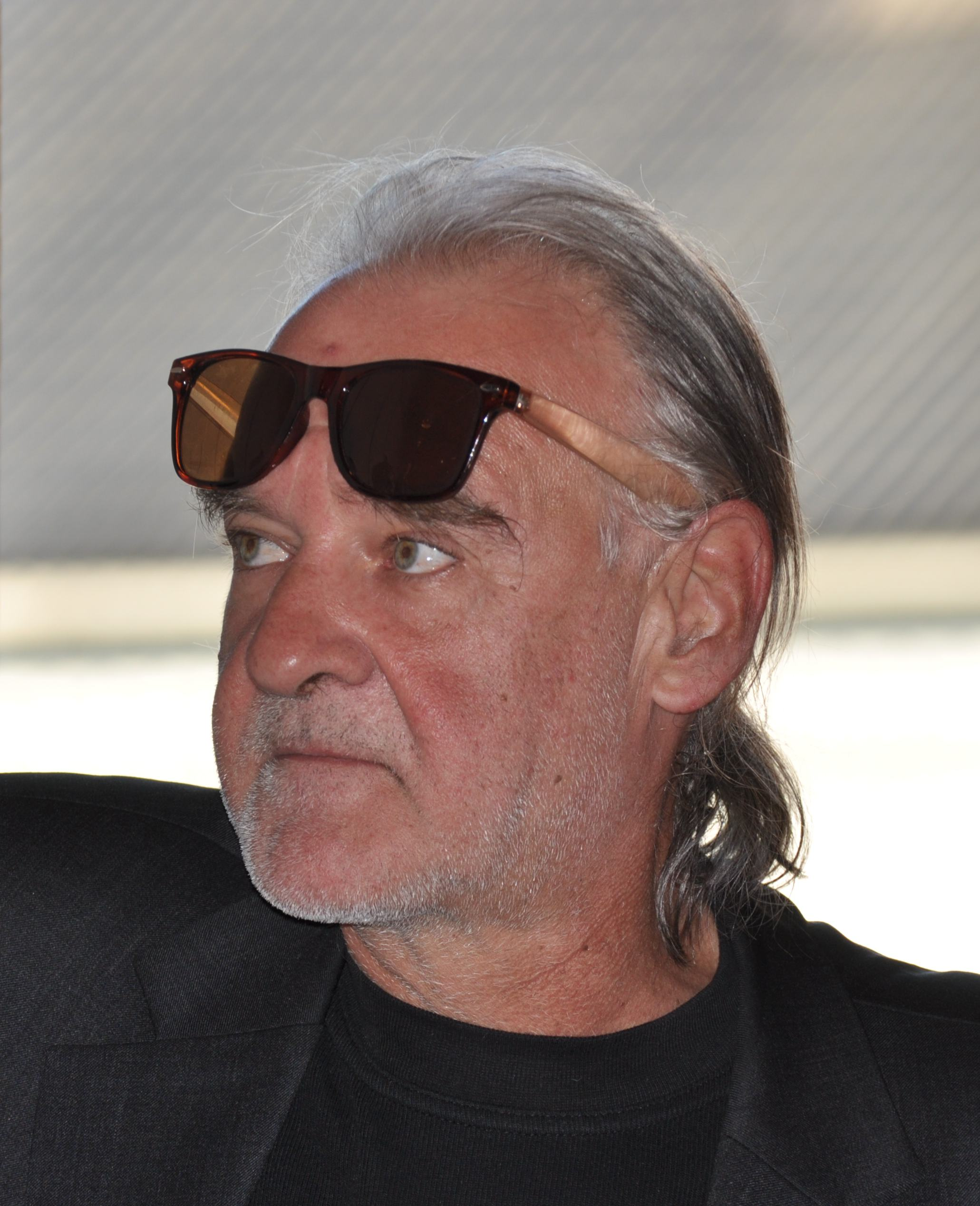
- Tarr in 2012
- Born: 21 July 1955; Pécs, Hungarian People's Republic
- Died: 6 January 2026 (aged 70); Budapest, Hungary
- Occupation: Filmmaker
- Years active: 1971–2025
- Notable work: Damnation (1988); Sátántangó (1994); Werckmeister Harmonies (2000); The Turin Horse (2011)
- Children: Réka Gáborjáni-Szabó (stepdaughter)

Béla Tarr (21 July 1955 – 6 January 2026) was a Hungarian film director, screenwriter and producer. His films are distinguished by their stark black-and-white visuals, extended long takes, languid pacing, and an absence of traditional plotting. They explore existential themes and often focus on marginalized, desperate characters in bleak landscapes. He became known as a founding figure of the slow cinema genre, most notably with his influential 1994 film Sátántangó. That film is often in scholarly polls of the greatest films ever made.

Debuting with the film Family Nest (1979), Tarr began his directorial career with a brief period of what he refers to as "social cinema", aimed at telling everyday stories about ordinary people, often in the style of cinema vérité. Almanac of Fall (1984) follows the inhabitants of a run-down apartment as they struggle to live together while sharing their hostilities. The drama Damnation (1988) was lauded for its languid and controlled camera movement, which Tarr would become known for internationally. Sátántangó (1994) and Werckmeister Harmonies (2000) continued his bleak and desolate representations of reality, while incorporating apocalyptic overtones. Tarr would later compete at the 2007 Cannes Film Festival with his film The Man from London, which opened to moderately positive reviews.

After the release of the critically acclaimed A torinói ló (The Turin Horse) (2011), Tarr announced his retirement from feature-length film direction and turned increasingly toward film education. In Sarajevo, he founded the international film school known as film.factory, which officially began its work in February 2013 within the Sarajevo School of Science and Technology. Tarr served as the programme's designer, head and professor until 2016; the film.factory project at the Sarajevo Film Academy was completed in September 2017.

In his last decades, he continued to explore media beyond traditional film form. In 2017, at Eye Filmmuseum in Amsterdam, he developed an exhibition entitled Till the End of the World - a cross between a film, a theatre set, and an installation, which attracted over 40,000 visitors. Commissioned by the Wiener Festwochen, in 2019, he authored Missing People, a site-specific project created at the intersection between performance, installation, and motion picture, involving 250 Viennese homeless people.

Tarr's films were shaped by a recurring creative team. Editor and co-director Ágnes Hranitzky first worked with Tarr as editor of The Outsider (1981) and remained his longest-standing creative and directorial collaborator. Beginning with Werckmeister Harmonies, she was also credited as co-director on Tarr's later feature films, including The Man from London and The Turin Horse. From Kárhozat (Damnation) onwards, his key collaborators included Nobel Prize-winning László Krasznahorkai, composer Mihály Víg, cinematographer Gábor Medvigy, and artist, set and costume designer Gyula Pauer. Víg’s contribution extended beyond music: he also played Irimiás, the central returning figure in Sátántangó. Cinematographer Fred Kelemen became an important later collaborator, shooting A Londoni férfi (The Man from London) and A torinói ló (The Turin Horse). Regular performers in Tarr’s later films included János Derzsi, Erika Bók, Mihály Kormos, Éva Almássy Albert, and László feLugossy.

== Biography ==
=== Early life ===
Tarr was born on 21 July 1955 in Pécs, but grew up in Budapest. His parents were in both the theatre and film industry: his father Béla Tarr designed scenery, while his mother Mari Tarr worked as a prompter at a theatre for more than fifty years. His brother is the painter György Tarr.

At the age of ten, Tarr was taken to a casting session run by Hungarian National Television by his mother, and he ultimately won the role of the protagonist's son in a TV drama adaptation of Tolstoy's The Death of Ivan Ilyich. Other than a small role in Miklós Jancsó's film Szörnyek évadja (Season of Monsters, 1986) and few one-glimpse cameos (such as in Gábor Bódy's Dog's Night Song [1983]), Tarr has sought no other acting roles.

Tarr's father bought him a 8mm camera for his fourteenth birthday. At age sixteen, Tarr founded a filmmaking group with friends called Dziga Vertov (a reference to the Dziga Vertov Group). They made a film called Guest Workers which won first prize at an amateur film festival. As a result of this film, he was questioned by communist authorities. He applied to study philosophy at university, but he was rejected from all higher education in the country, so he sought odd jobs and continued to make amateur films.

By his own account, initially he sought to become a philosopher, and considered film-making as something of a hobby. However, after making his 8mm short films, the Hungarian government would not allow Tarr to attend university so he instead chose to pursue film production.

=== Artistic and professional career ===
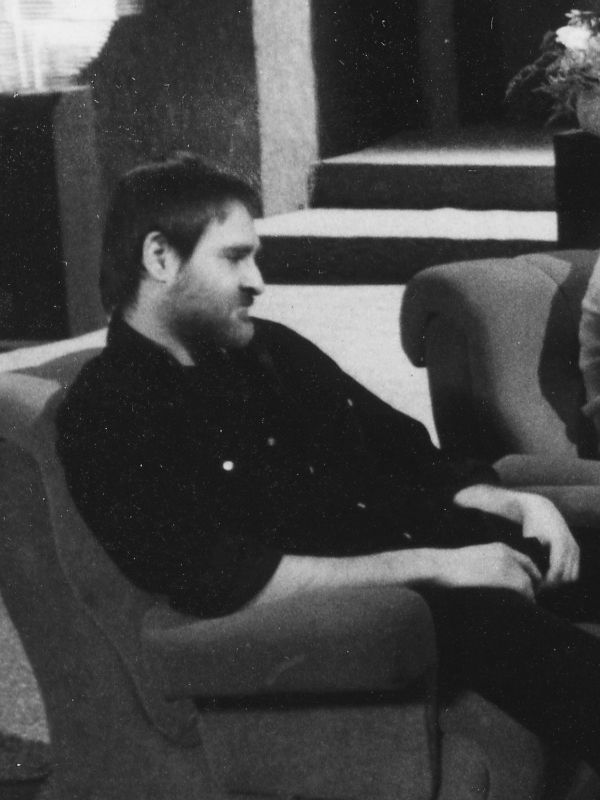
Béla Tarr in 1983

Tarr began to realize his interest in film making at the age of 16 by making amateur films and later working as a caretaker at a national House for Culture and Recreation. Most of his amateur works were documentaries, mostly about the life of workers or poor people in urban Hungary. His amateur work brought him to the attention of the Béla Balázs Studios (named in honor of the Hungarian cinema theorist) which helped fund Tarr's 1977 feature debut, Családi tűzfészek (Family Nest), which Tarr began filming at age 22. He shot the film in six days with little budget and using non-professional actors. The film was faithful to the "Budapest school" or "documentarist" style popular at the time within Béla Balázs Studios, maintaining absolute social realism on screen. Critics found the film to suggest the influence of the American director John Cassavetes, although Tarr denied having seen any of Cassavetes's films prior to shooting Családi tűzfészek (Family Nest), which was released in 1979.

After completing Családi tűzfészek, Tarr began his studies in the University of Theatre and Film Arts in Budapest. The 1981 film Szabadgyalog (The Outsider) and the following year's Panelkapcsolat (The Prefab People) continued in much the same vein, with small changes in style. The latter was the first film by Tarr to feature professional actors in the leading roles. With a 1982 television adaptation of Macbeth, his work began to change dramatically. The film is composed of only two shots: the first shot (before the main title) is five minutes long, the second 57 minutes long.

After 1984's Őszi almanach (Almanac of Fall), Tarr (who had written his first four features alone) began collaborating with Hungarian novelist László Krasznahorkai for 1988's Kárhozat (Damnation). A planned adaptation of Krasznahorkai's epic novel Sátántangó took over seven years to realize; the 415-minute film was finally released to international acclaim in 1994. After this epic he released the 35-minute Journey on the Plain in 1995, but fell into silence until 2000's Werckmeister Harmóniák (Werckmeister Harmonies). It was acclaimed by critics and the Festival circuit in general.

Many, if not most, of the shots in these later films are around six to eleven minutes long. It is possible that for some, a month was spent on a single shot. In many of these shots the camera swoops, glides, pans, and/or cranes. Often it circles the characters, and sometimes even spans multiple scenes. A shot may, as in the opening of Sátántangó, travel with a herd of cows around a village, or follow the nocturnal peregrinations of a drunkard who is forced to leave his house because he's run out of alcohol. American writer and critic Susan Sontag championed Tarr as one of the saviors of modern cinema, saying she would gladly watch Sátántangó once a year.

After Werckmeister Harmonies he began filming A Londoni férfi (The Man From London) an adaptation of a Georges Simenon novel. It was scheduled to be released at the 2005 Cannes Film Festival in May, but production was postponed because of the February suicide of producer Humbert Balsan. Additionally, there were disputes with other producers regarding a possible change in the film's financing. It premiered at the 2007 Cannes Film Festival and was released worldwide in 2008. Tarr then began working on a film called A torinói ló (The Turin Horse) which he said would be his last.

For many years, none of his work was available on DVD (except in Japan), but Werckmeister Harmonies and Damnation have been made available on a two-disc DVD in Europe, courtesy of Artificial Eye (who have also issued The Man From London) and both films are now available in North America on separate DVDs from Facets Video. Tarr's early works; Family Nest, The Outsider, and The Prefab People are also available on DVD in the US, courtesy of Facets. Facets was supposed to release Sátántangó on DVD on 28 November 2006 but was delayed until 22 July 2008. Artificial Eye released the film on 14 November 2006. A comparison of the two DVD editions has been posted at DVD Beaver. In 2020, a 4K restoration of Sátántangó was released on Blu-ray by Curzon Artificial Eye and was made available for online streaming by the Criterion Channel.

In January 2011, Tarr joined the Board of Directors of the recently formed cinema foundation and NGO for human rights Cine Foundation International. In a press release dated 24 January 2011 Tarr made the following statement regarding the imprisonment of filmmakers Jafar Panahi and Mohammad Rasoulof:

Cinematography is an integral part of universal human culture! An attack against cinematography is desecrating universal human culture! This cannot be justified by any notion, ideology or religious conviction! Our friend, brother and esteemed colleague Jafar Panahi is in prison today, based on conjured and fictional accusations! Jafar did not do anything else than what is the duty of all of us; to talk honestly, fairly about our own country and loved ones, to show everything that surrounds us with tender tolerance and harsh austerity! Jafar's real crime is that he did just that; gracefully, elegantly and with a roguish smile in his eyes! Jafar made us love his heroes, the people of Iran; he achieved that they have become members of our families! WE CANNOT LOSE HIM! This is our common responsibility, as despite all appearances we belong together.

In July 2021, he executive-produced the Icelandic-Swedish-Polish horror-drama film Lamb, directed by his former student at film.factory, Valdimar Jóhannsson.

=== Death ===
On 6 January 2026, Tarr died at a Budapest hospital at the age of 70, after a long and serious illness.

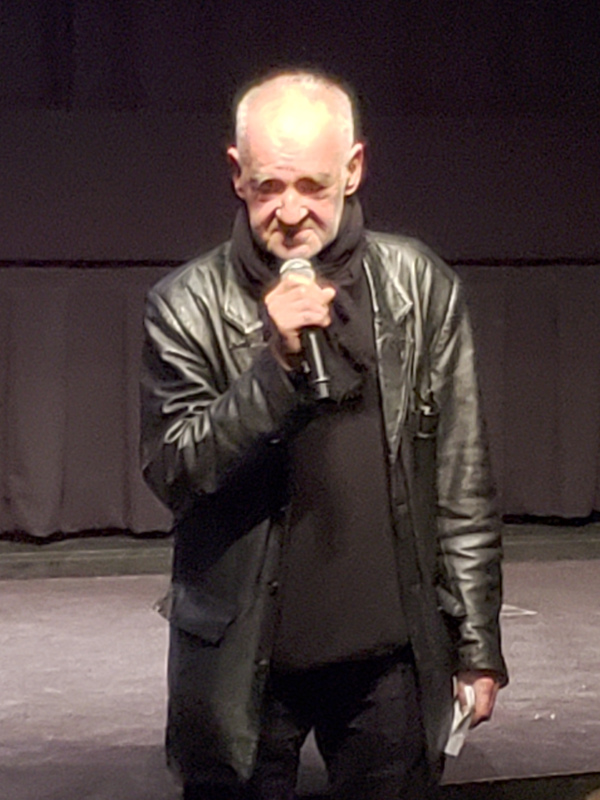
Tarr presenting a film by Hu Bo in 2018

== Awards ==
In 1979, he received the Grand Prize for his film Family Nest at the Mannheim–Heidelberg International Film Festival. In 1982, he received a Special Mention Award for the film The Prefab People at the Locarno International Film Festival. Two years later, at the same festival, Tarr received the Ernest Artaria Award for his film Almanac of Fall. In 1988, he received the Bronze Rosa Camuna Award for his film Damnation at the Bergamo Film Meeting.

In 1994, he received several awards for the film Satantango, including the Caligari Film Award (Berlin International Film Festival), the National Society of Film Critics Award for Experimental Film, the Âge d'Or Prize (Brussels Prix de l’Âge d’Or), the Grand Prix of the Jury (Budapest Hungarian Film Week), as well as the FIPRESCI Prize and the Golden Moon Award for Best Director at the Faro Island Film Festival.

In 2001, he received the Berliner Zeitung Jury Award for his film Werckmeister Harmonies at the Berlin International Film Festival. In 2005, he received the France Culture Award (Foreign Filmmaker of the Year) for the film Damnation.

In February 2011, he received the Silver Bear Grand Jury Prize and the Competition FIPRESCI Prize at the 61st Berlin Film Festival for his film The Turin Horse. In September 2012, he received the BIAFF special award for lifetime achievement. In 2016, he was appointed Honorary Professor at the Beijing Film Academy. In 2017, he was awarded the Honorary Medal and appointed Honorary Professor at Wuhan University. In June 2017, he received the lifetime achievement at Sardinia Film Festival, XII edition. In 2021, he received the Homeland Award in Budapest.

In December 2022, he received the lifetime achievement award at International Film Festival of Kerala, IFFK, 27th edition. In December 2023, he received the Honorary Award of the EFA President and Board at the 36th European Film Awards. In 2023, he was conferred an Honorary Doctorate by FAMU - Prague University of the Arts.

In November 2024, he received the Lifetime Achievement Award at the 37th Tokyo International Film Festival, TIFF.

== Political views ==
In his later high school years, Tarr became an anarchist. Speaking to Partizán, a left-wing podcast, he said that during his last years of high school, he "didn't even take [his] schoolbag" because "[he] had Mao's Bible in [his] pocket".

In an interview in 2023 Tarr said "I still consider myself an anarchist". Tarr was an atheist.

Tarr was a critic of nationalism. In a 2016 interview said, "Trump is the shame of the United States. Mr. Orbán is the shame of Hungary. Marine Le Pen is the shame of France. Et cetera." In a letter hung near the entrance to a pro-migration exhibition in front of the Hungarian Parliament, Tarr wrote, "We have brought the planet to the brink of catastrophe with our greediness and our unlimited ignorance. With the horrible wars we waged with the goal of robbing the people there. [...] Now we are confronted with the victims of our acts. We must ask the question: who are we, and what morality do we represent when we build a fence to keep out these people?"

In December 2023, alongside 50 other filmmakers, Tarr signed an open letter published in Libération demanding a ceasefire and an end to the killing of civilians amid the 2023 Israeli invasion of the Gaza Strip, and for a humanitarian corridor into Gaza to be established for humanitarian aid, and the release of hostages.

== Legacy ==
=== Art ===
Gus Van Sant often cites Tarr as a huge influence on his later work, beginning with Gerry when Van Sant began using very long uninterrupted takes.

=== Anarchist movement ===
After his death, Freedom published a eulogy in his honour, saying about him that: "his social realism was always suspicious of established power". This appreciation was shared by Autonomies.

== Filmography ==
=== Feature films ===
- Családi tűzfészek / Family Nest (1979)
- Szabadgyalog / The Outsider (1981)
- Panelkapcsolat / The Prefab People (1982)
- Őszi almanach / Almanac of Fall (1984)
- Kárhozat / Damnation (1988)
- Sátántangó / Satantango (1994)
- Werckmeister harmóniák / Werckmeister Harmonies (2000)
- A londoni férfi / The Man from London (2007)
- A torinói ló / The Turin Horse (2011)

=== Television films ===
- Macbeth (1982)

=== Short films ===
- Hotel Magnezit (1978)
- Cinemarxisme (1979)
- Diplomafilm (1979)
- Utazás az alföldön / Journey on the Plain (1995)
- Visions of Europe (2004)
  - segment: Prologue

=== Documentary films ===
- Az utolsó hajó / The Last Boat (1990, 31 min), segment from City Life
- Muhamed (2017, 10 min)
- Missing People (2019, 95 min)

== See also ==
- List of atheists in film, radio, television and theater

== Sources ==
- Ramón Andrés, «Nada. A propósito de El caballo de Turín de Béla Tarr», en Pensar y no caer (Barcelona: Acantilado, 2016), pp. 195–220.
- Thorsten Botz-Bornstein, Organic Cinema: Film Architecture, and the Work of Bela Tarr (New York: Berghahn, 2017)
- Jacques Rancière, Béla Tarr, the Time After (Minneapolis: Univocal, 2013)
- András Bálint Kovács, The Cinema of Béla Tarr: The Circle Closes (London: Wallflower, 2013)
- Ira Jaffe: Slow Movies, Countering the Cinema of Action (New York: Wallflower Press, 2014)
