= Family Nest =

- DVD cover
- Directed by: Béla Tarr
- Written by: Béla Tarr
- Starring: Irén Szajki; László Horváth; Gáborné Kun; Gábor Kun
- Cinematography: Ferenc Pap
- Edited by: Anna Kornis
- Music by: János Bródy; Mihály Móricz; Szabolcs Szörényi; Béla Tolcsvay; László Tolcsvay
- Production company: Balázs Béla Stúdió
- Release date: 29 January 1979
- Running time: 108 minutes
- Country: Hungary
- Language: Hungarian

Family Nest (Hungarian: Családi tűzfészek) is a 1979 Hungarian black-and-white drama film, directed by Béla Tarr. The film won Grand Prize at the 1979 Mannheim-Heidelberg International Film Festival, tying with the film El Super.

== Premise ==
Irén lives with her daughter in her in-laws’ small apartment in the center of Budapest. Her husband has just returned from his national service, and their relationship is deteriorating. Soon, Irén wants to leave the family—but her rehousing request gets caught up in the Communist administration.

== Cast ==
- Irén Szajki as Irén
- László Horváth as Laci
- Gábor Kun as Laci’s Father
- Gáborné Kun as Laci’s Mother

== Reception ==
Family Nest received moderately positive reviews from film critics. On the review aggregator website Rotten Tomatoes, 80% of 5 critics' reviews are positive, with an average rating of 6.9/10. Jonathan Rosenbaum of Chicago Reader wrote, "This is strong stuff, but the highly formal director of Almanac of Fall, Damnation, and Satantango is still far from apparent." Keith Uhlich of Slant Magazine rated the film 2/4 stars and called the characters "unconvincing mouthpieces for a highly unsubtle political critique."

== Home Release ==
The latest and highest quality release of Family Nest is in the Béla Tarr | A Curzon Collection which was released by Curzon and presents the film in HD.
