= Damnation (film) =

- Directed by: Béla Tarr
- Written by: Béla Tarr; László Krasznahorkai
- Edited by: Ágnes Hranitzky
- Music by: Mihály Vig
- Release date: 1988
- Running time: 116 minutes
- Country: Hungary
- Language: Hungarian

Damnation (Hungarian: Kárhozat) is a 1988 black-and-white Hungarian film directed by Béla Tarr, written by Tarr and László Krasznahorkai, and edited by Ágnes Hranitzky, Tarr's directorial collaborator.

== Plot ==
Karrer, a depressed man, is in love with a married torch singer from a local bar, the Titanik. The singer breaks off their affair, because she dreams of becoming famous. Karrer is offered smuggling work by Willarsky, a local bartender. Karrer offers the job to the singer's husband, Sebestyén. This gets him out of the way, but things do not go as Karrer plans. Betrayals follow. Karrer despairs.

== Production ==
Damnation marked a major stage in the long collaboration between Béla Tarr and Ágnes Hranitzky. Hranitzky edited the film and is listed in András Bálint Kovács's filmography as co-director. The film also brought together several of the recurring collaborators associated with Tarr and Hranitzky's later work, including Nobel Prize-winning writer László Krasznahorkai, composer Mihály Víg, cinematographer Gábor Medvigy, and set and costume designer Gyula Pauer.

== Reception ==
Damnation is generally acclaimed by film critics, and many rank it one of Tarr's finest works. On the review aggregator website Rotten Tomatoes, 94% of 18 critics' reviews are positive, with an average rating of 7.8/10. Michael Atkinson of Village Voice called the film "a serotonin-depleted ordeal, and yet seemingly a sketchbook of vibes and ideas to come, with some of the most magnificent black-and-white images shot anywhere in the world." Jonathan Rosenbaum wrote in the Chicago Reader, "The near miracle is that something so compulsively watchable can be made out of a setting and society that seem so depressive and petrified." Writing for Slant Magazine, Jeremiah Kipp argued, "In terms of creating a strong cinematic world, Tarr has few equals." A review compared the film to the works of Andrei Tarkovsky and Michelangelo Antonioni.
