= Werckmeister Harmonies =

2001 Hungarian drama mystery film

- Theatrical release poster
- Directed by: Béla Tarr; Ágnes Hranitzky
- Screenplay by: László Krasznahorkai; Béla Tarr
- Based on: The Melancholy of Resistance by László Krasznahorkai
- Produced by: Béla Tarr
- Starring: Lars Rudolph; Peter Fitz; Hanna Schygulla
- Cinematography: Milós Gurbán; Erwin Lanzensberger; Gábor Medvigy; Emil Novák; Patrick de Ranter; Rob Tregenza; Jörg Widmer
- Edited by: Ágnes Hranitzky
- Music by: Mihály Vig
- Release dates: May 2000 (Cannes); 12 July 2000 (Belgium); 1 February 2001 (Hungary)
- Running time: 145 minutes
- Country: Hungary
- Language: Hungarian
- Budget: $1.6 million
- Box office: $73,404

Werckmeister Harmonies (pronounced [verkˈmaɪ̯stɐ]; Hungarian: Werckmeister harmóniák) is a 2000 Hungarian drama film directed by Béla Tarr and Ágnes Hranitzky, based on the 1989 novel The Melancholy of Resistance by László Krasznahorkai. Shot in black-and-white and composed of thirty-nine languidly paced shots, the film portrays the life of János and his uncle György during the communist era in Hungary. It also recounts their journey among helpless citizens as a sinister visiting circus casts a shadow over everyone's lives.

The title refers to the 17th century Baroque musical theorist Andreas Werckmeister. György Eszter, a major character in the film, delivers a monologue asserting that Werckmeister's harmonic principles are responsible for aesthetic and philosophical problems in all subsequent music, and should be replaced by a new theory of tuning and harmony.

The film was screened in the Directors' Fortnight section in 53rd Cannes Film Festival in 2000. Werckmeister Harmonies opened to wide acclaim from critics, and has come to be regarded by many as one of the best films of the 21st century. In the Sight and Sound 2022 decennial critics poll, Werckmeister Harmonies ranks 243rd.

== Plot ==
In an unnamed, desolate and isolated small town in Hungary (Note: Although the country is not named.) during a winter season in recent times, (Note: The period may correspond to the Hungarian People's Republic era but that too is not mentioned.) János Valuska, a young newspaper-delivery man, conducts a performance with drunken bar patrons about the total eclipse of the sun, which disturbs, then silences the animals. It finishes with the grand return of the warm sunlight.

János is devoted to his 'uncle' György Eszter, a composer and musicologist, who is like a father to him. György records his observations about the imperfection and compromise of the musical scale, as defined by Werckmeister. György proposes changes to the natural scale to make its harmonies more natural.

János goes to the post office to pick up his newspapers for delivery. The workers are unsettled by the ominous signs of the circus' arrival and the cloud that settles over each town it visits.

A "circus" built around a huge stuffed smelly whale and its star performer, "The Prince", who is never seen, come to town in the night. János sees them arrive and philosophizes about God and the whale.

György's estranged wife, Tünde, tries to leverage her political and social status by giving György a list of names to recruit for the "Clean Up the Town movement," with the blessing of the police chief, and demands that György become chairman of the movement, or else she will move back in with him that very evening. She sends her suitcase ahead of her with János. György's struggling cobbler brother, Uncle Lajos, takes the list and passes it on to the agitated crowd in the town square who are unhappy with the failing public services. János is accosted by a thug in front of the open truck housing the whale. Tünde sleeps with the drunk gun-toting police chief.

The presence of the whale and the "Prince" stir up the crowd. János overhears the circus master losing control of his faceless Prince, who speaks (in Slovak) through a translator of revolutions and ruins. The circus master is afraid of consequences and disowns him. The Prince, now free, inflames the mob who, holding clubs, march, then run into a hospital, (Note: The institution is probably psychiatric; one supposes dissidents opposing the regime are kept there.) drag inmates out of their beds and beat them. When the rioters finally find a helpless old naked patient, who is extremely emaciated, they withdraw silently.

After the riot, János comes across the diary of a rioter. It explains that the rioters did not know what they were angry with; so they were angry at everything. Then it recounts the mob's horrendous rape of two post-office girls. On his way home, he witnesses from a distance a meeting between Tünde and a military officer. They depart together on a military vehicle to reclaim the town, accompanied by soldiers and a tank.

János then comes across the body of Lajos, who was killed in the riot. János is told by Lajos's wife to leave for his own safety, as his name was on a list held by the rioters. János runs away on the railroad tracks but is intercepted by a helicopter. He finds himself committed to a mental institution with caged beds. When György visits him, János simply stares into the blank space and does not respond to György, who recounts to János what has happened since the riot. György has been evicted from their house but gets to live in a shed in the garden whilst his wife, Tünde, with her new status as a collaborator, now occupies the big house with the police chief. György tells János, in the ward, that, if he is released from the mental institution, they can live contentedly together in the shed with his piano. György also mentions that he has re-tuned the piano so that it is now like any other, a personal capitulation apparently abandoning any present hopes of reform. János just stares into the blank space.

The film ends with György walking through the town square and looking directly into the eye of the abandoned whale, then walking away and looking back at the now sad and disheveled whale and the “circus” destroyed by the rioters the night before. The whale's rotting carcass is slowly enveloped by the thickening fog.

== Production ==
The film is an international production whose financing took a long time for Tarr to secure.

The credits indicate that filming took place between 1997 and 2000.

Cinematographer Rob Tregenza and actress Hanna Schygulla criticized the film's production. Tregenza claimed Tarr was dishonest about the film's financing. He also claimed credit for the film's opening scene and hospital sequence. Schygulla characterized her experience on the film as disappointing and noted the pay was poor. She said of Tarr, "Everything just goes into his obsession and nothing is for the people who work for it and they work so hard."

== Cast ==
- Lars Rudolph as János Valuska, dubbed in Hungarian by Tamás Bolba
- Peter Fitz as György Eszter, dubbed in Hungarian by Péter Haumann
- Hanna Schygulla as Tünde Eszter, dubbed in Hungarian by Marianna Moór
- János Derzsi as the Man In The Broad-Cloth Coat
- Đoko Rosić as the Man In Western Boots
- Tamás Wichmann as the Man In The Sailor-Cap
- Ferenc Kállai as the Circus Master
- Péter Dobai as the Police Captain

== Reception and legacy ==
=== Critical response ===
Werckmeister Harmonies received critical acclaim. Metacritic, which uses a weighted average, assigned the film a score of 93 out of 100, based on 9 critics, indicating "universal acclaim". Based on 58 reviews, Rotten Tomatoes reports a 97% approval rating, with an average score of 9.1/10. The website's critics consensus reads, "Mesmerizingly lovely and thematically thought-provoking, Werckmeister Harmonies adds another indelible achievement to Bela Tarr's fascinating filmography."

Lawrence van Gelder of The New York Times called the film "elusive" and argued that it "beckons filmgoers who complain about the vapidity of Hollywood movie making and yearn for a film to ponder and debate." David Sterritt, writing for the Christian Science Monitor, awarded it a full four stars, remarking, "Tarr wants to stir the imagination and awaken the conscience of his audience rather than divert us with easy entertainment."

=== Legacy ===
In a 2016 BBC poll of the best films since 2000, the film was placed 56th.

Film critic Roger Ebert described the movie as "unique and original", writing that it "feels as much like cinéma vérité as the works of Frederick Wiseman." He went on to add the film to his "Great Movies" collection in 2007.

In the 2012 British Film Institute's decennial Sight & Sound poll, ten critics and five directors voted Werckmeister Harmonies among their ten favorite films — placing it 171st in the critics' poll and 132nd in the directors' poll. In the 2022 critics' poll, it was ranked 243rd.

In 2025, it was one of the films voted for the "Readers' Choice" edition of The New York Times' list of "The 100 Best Movies of the 21st Century," finishing at number 316.

=== Home video ===
The only home video release for a long time in Region 1 (U.S. and Canada) was released by Facets, and had gone out of print. The restored version was released by The Criterion Collection on 4K, Blu-ray, and DVD formats on 16 April 2024. On 18 November 2024 Curzon released it in 4K for Region 2 (UK, Europe, Japan, and the Middle East). Curzon also included it their Béla Tarr | A Curzon Collection - Limited Edition boxset which released on 2 December 2024.

=== Restoration ===
The movie was restored in 4K resolution by National Film Institute Hungary and Cinegrell in 2022. Film at Lincoln Center (FLC) announced the new restoration of Werckmeister Harmonies, opening 26 May 2023, in the Walter Reade Theater.
