= The World Goes On =

Book of short stories by László Krasznahorkai

- First edition cover (Hungary)
- Author: László Krasznahorkai
- Original title: Megy a világ
- Translators: John Batki; Ottilie Mulzet; George Szirtes
- Language: Hungarian
- Genre: Short story collection
- Publisher: Magvető
- Publication date: March 2013
- Publication place: Hungary
- English publication date: 2 November 2017
- Media type: Print (hardcover)
- Pages: 296
- ISBN: 978-963-14-3073-8
- OCLC: 909943799
- Dewey Decimal: 894/.51134
- LC Class: PH3281.K8866 M44 2013

The World Goes On (Hungarian: Megy a világ) is a collection of twenty-one short stories by László Krasznahorkai. Originally published in Hungarian by Magvető in 2013, it was later translated to English by John Batki, Ottilie Mulzet, and George Szirtes and published in 2017 by New Directions Publishing. World Literature Today described the book as "not a novel and not really a collection of short stories" but one that "defies a certain logic". It is divided into three sections with a loose connection among each.

The English translation was shortlisted for the 2018 Man Booker International Prize.

== Contents ==
- He
  - I. Speaks
    - "Wandering-Standing" (tr. Ottilie Mulzet)
    - "On Velocity" (tr. George Szirtes)
    - "He Wants to Forget" (tr. John Batki)
    - "How Lovely" (tr. Batki)
    - "At the Latest, in Turin" (tr. Batki)
    - "The World Goes On" (tr. Batki)
    - "Universal Theseus" (tr. Batki)
    - "One Hundred People All Told" (tr. Batki)
    - "Not on the Heraclitean Path" (tr. Batki)
  - II. Narrates
    - "Nine Dragon Crossing" (tr. Batki)
    - "One Time on 381" (tr. Batki)
    - "György Fehér's Henrik Molnár" (tr. Batki)
    - "Bankers" (tr. Mulzet)
    - "A Drop of Water" (tr. Batki)
    - "Downhill on a Forest Road" (tr. Szirtes)
    - "The Bill" (tr. Szirtes)
    - "That Gagarin" (tr. Mulzet)
    - "Obstacle Theory" (tr. Batki)
    - "Journey in a Place Without Blessings" (tr. Mulzet)
    - "The Swan of Istanbul" (tr. Batki)
  - III. Bids Farewell
    - "I Don't Need Anything from Here" (tr. Mulzet)

== Publication ==
The book was published in Hungarian by Magvető in March 2013. It was translated into English by John Batki, Ottilie Mulzet, and George Szirtes and published in 2017 by Tuskar Rock Press in the United Kingdom and New Directions Publishing in the United States. The translation was first published by Tuskar Rock on 2 November 2017.

Many of the stories had been previously published:

- 1990: "At the Latest, in Turin" ("Legkésőbb Torinóban")
- 2001: "Not on the Heraclitean Path" ("Nem a hérakleitoszi úton")
- 2002: "The World Goes On" ("Megy a világ előre")
- 2003: "One Hundred People All Told" ("Talán száz ember összesen")
- 2005: "Wandering-Standing" ("Bolyongás állva")
- 2008: "Downhill on a Forest Road" ("Lefelé egy erdei úton")
- 2009: "On Velocity" ("A sebességről")
- 2010: "The Bill: For Palma Vecchio, at Venice" ("Számla: Palma Vecchiónak, Velencébe")
- 2010: "Nine Dragon Crossing"

== Reception ==
In its starred review, Publishers Weekly wrote, "This book breaks all conventions and tests the very limits of language, resulting in a transcendent, astounding experience."

Kirkus Reviews praised Krasznahorkai's "dense, philosophically charged prose", comparing it to the works of James Joyce and Friedrich Nietzsche.

Claire Kohda Hazelton of The Observer called it "a masterpiece of invention, utterly different from everything else".
