= 2016 Nobel Prize in Literature =

- Bob Dylan
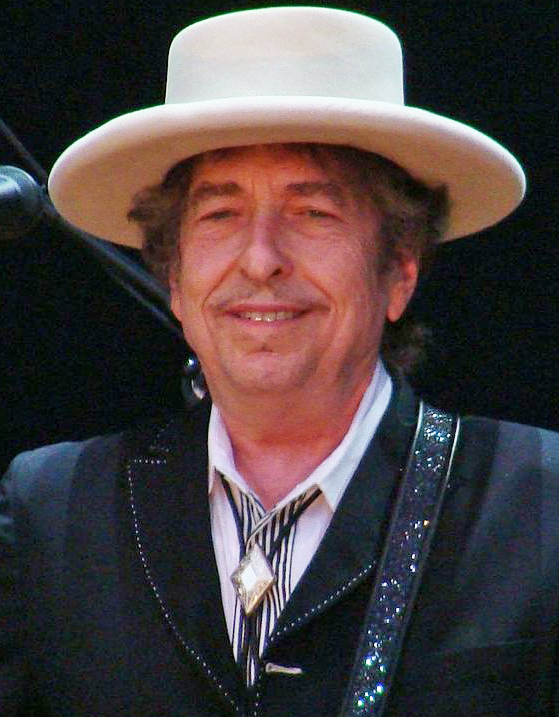
- "for having created new poetic expressions within the great American song tradition."
- Date: 13 October 2016 (announcement); 10 December 2016 (ceremony)
- Location: Stockholm, Sweden
- Presented by: Swedish Academy
- First award: 1901
- Website: Official website

The 2016 Nobel Prize in Literature was awarded to the American singer-songwriter Bob Dylan (born 1941) "for having created new poetic expressions within the great American song tradition". The prize was announced by the Swedish Academy on 13 October 2016. He is the 12th Nobel laureate from the United States.

== Laureate ==
Bob Dylan's songs are rooted in American folk music traditions and are influenced by the poets of modernism and the beatnik movement. Early on, Dylan's lyrics incorporated social struggles and political protest. Love and religion are other important themes in his songs. His writing is often characterized by refined rhymes and it paints surprising, sometimes surreal imagery. Since his debut in 1962, he has repeatedly reinvented his songs and music. He has also written books, including his poetry collection Tarantula (1971) and his memoirs Chronicles: Volume One (2004).

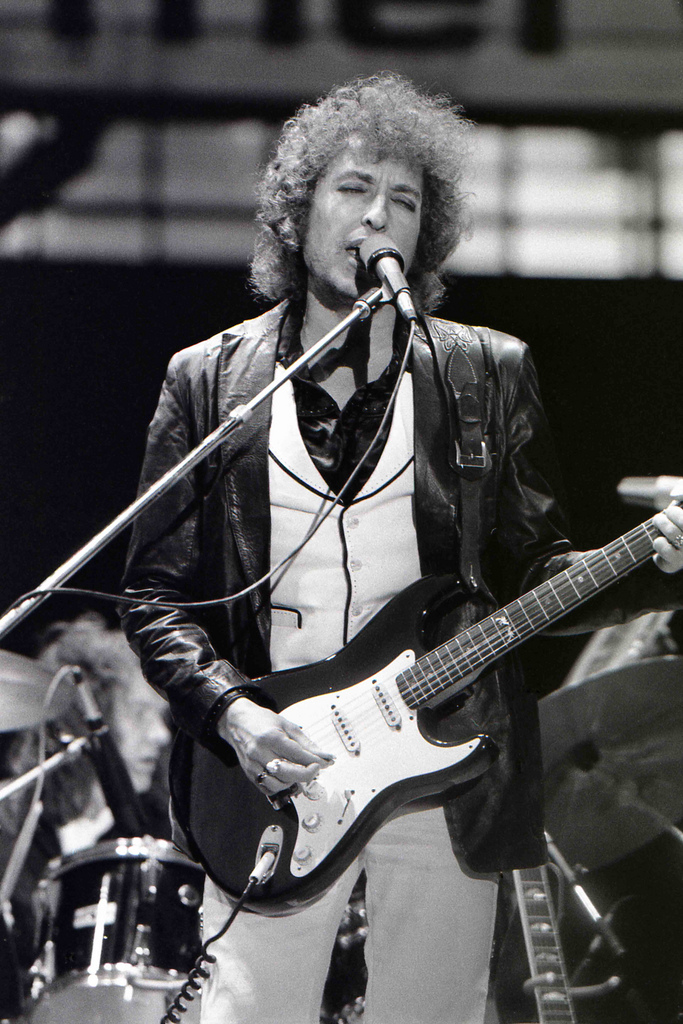
Bob Dylan at the Rotterdam De Kuip on June 23, 1978.

== Candidates ==
On Ladbrokes, Japanese novelist Haruki Murakami was the favourite to win the 2016 Nobel Prize in Literature, followed by Syrian poet Adonis, American novelist Philip Roth and Kenyan Ngugi wa Thiong'o. Other top favourites included Albanian Ismail Kadare, American Joyce Carol Oates, Hungarian László Krasznahorkai (awarded in 2025), Irish John Banville, Korean Ko Un, Norwegian Jon Fosse (awarded in 2023), Portuguese António Lobo Antunes and Spanish Javier Marías. The Ladbrokes odds of Bob Dylan winning the prize were set to 50/1.

== Dylan's acceptance of award ==
The Nobel Prize committee announced on October 13, 2016, that it would be awarding Dylan the Nobel Prize in Literature "for having created new poetic expressions within the great American song tradition". Dylan remained silent for days after receiving the award, before telling journalist Edna Gundersen that getting the award was "amazing, incredible. Who ever dreams about something like that?"

The Swedish Academy announced in November 2016 that Dylan would not travel to Stockholm for the Nobel Prize Ceremony due to "pre-existing commitments". At the Nobel Banquet in Stockholm on December 10, 2016, Dylan's speech was given by Azita Raji, U.S. Ambassador to Sweden. Patti Smith performed his song "A Hard Rain's A-Gonna Fall" to orchestral accompaniment.

On April 2, 2017, academy secretary Sara Danius reported:

"Earlier today the Swedish Academy met with Bob Dylan for a private ceremony [with no media present] in Stockholm, during which Dylan received his gold medal and diploma. Twelve members of the Academy were present. Spirits were high. Champagne was had. Quite a bit of time was spent looking closely at the gold medal, in particular the beautifully crafted back, an image of a young man sitting under a laurel tree who listens to the Muse. Taken from Virgil's Aeneid, the inscription reads: Inventas vitam iuvat excoluisse per artes, loosely translated as 'And they who bettered life on earth by their newly found mastery'".

Dylan's Nobel Lecture was posted on the Nobel Prize website on June 5, 2017. The New York Times pointed out that, in order to collect the prize's eight million Swedish kronor (US$900,000), the Swedish Academy's rules stipulate the laureate "must deliver a lecture within six months of the official ceremony, which would have made Mr. Dylan's deadline June 10". Academy secretary Danius commented: "The speech is extraordinary and, as one might expect, eloquent. Now that the lecture has been delivered, the Dylan adventure is coming to a close".

In his Nobel Prize lecture, Dylan wrote about the impact of three books on him: Herman Melville's Moby-Dick, Erich Maria Remarque's All Quiet on the Western Front and Homer's Odyssey. He concluded:

"Our songs are alive in the land of the living. But songs are unlike literature. They're meant to be sung, not read. The words in Shakespeare's plays were meant to be acted on the stage. Just as lyrics in songs are meant to be sung, not read on a page. And I hope some of you get the chance to listen to these lyrics the way they were intended to be heard: in concert or on record or however people are listening to songs these days. I return once again to Homer, who says, 'Sing in me, oh Muse, and through me tell the story'".

In 2017, the year after Dylan received his Nobel Prize, Harvard University Classics Professor Richard F. Thomas published a book entitled Why Bob Dylan Matters. In this work, Thomas suggests that Dylan's lyrics contain many literary allusions, including to the works of classic poets Homer, Ovid and Virgil. To support this claim, Thomas offered multiple examples of Dylan's 21st-century lyrics side-by-side with lines from these poets. Towards the beginning of his book, Thomas further argues for situating Dylan firmly alongside those whose work seems to have inspired him, noting: "For the past forty years, as a classics professor, I have been living in the worlds of the Greek and Roman poets, reading them, writing about them, and teaching them to students in their original languages and in English translation. I have for even longer been living in the world of Bob Dylan’s songs, and in my mind Dylan long ago joined the company of those ancient poets.".

== Reactions ==
The 2016 choice of Bob Dylan was the first time a musician and songwriter won the Nobel for Literature. The New York Times reported: "Mr. Dylan, 75, is the first musician to win the award, and his selection on Thursday is perhaps the most radical choice in a history stretching back to 1901."

Dylan's reception of the Nobel Prize caused controversy, particularly among writers who argued that the literary merits of Dylan's work were not equal to those of more traditional authors. Writer Rabih Alameddine tweeted, "Bob Dylan winning a Nobel in Literature is like Mrs Fields being awarded 3 Michelin stars." The French writer Pierre Assouline described the decision as "contemptuous of writers". In a live webchat hosted by The Guardian, Norwegian writer Karl Ove Knausgård said: "I'm very divided. I love that the Nobel committee opens up for other kinds of literature – lyrics and so on. I think that's brilliant. But knowing that Dylan is the same generation as Thomas Pynchon, Philip Roth, Cormac McCarthy, makes it very difficult for me to accept it." Scottish novelist Irvine Welsh said: "I'm a Dylan fan, but this is an ill conceived nostalgia award wrenched from the rancid prostates of senile, gibbering hippies."

Dylan's songwriting peer and friend Leonard Cohen said that no prizes were necessary to recognize "the greatness of the man who transformed pop music with records like Highway 61 Revisited", adding: "To me, [the Nobel] is like pinning a medal on Mount Everest for being the highest mountain." Writer and commentator Will Self wrote that the award "cheapened" Dylan whilst hoping the laureate would "follow Sartre in rejecting the award".

Other writers praised the decision, including Stephen King, Joyce Carol Oates, Salman Rushdie, and former U.S. poet laureate Billy Collins. Rushdie called Dylan a "brilliant inheritor of the bardic tradition."

When Philip Roth was asked about Dylan winning the Prize, he said, “It’s OK, but next year I hope Peter, Paul and Mary get it.”

=== Lecture plagiarism controversy ===
An article in Slate magazine by Andrea Pitzer found multiple parts of Dylan's Nobel lecture that closely resembled the analysis of Moby-Dick on the study guide website SparkNotes, including a passage Dylan "quoted" that was not in the book itself. According to an Associated Press analysis, the two texts contained more than 20 "identical phrases and similar phrasing", but "no verbatim sentences". The accusations prompted an article from The New York Times on the history of plagiarism accusations against Dylan, who had previously defended borrowing material as "a rich and enriching tradition" in folk music.

== Gallery ==
- 13 October 2016: Announcement of the 2016 Nobel laureate in Literature by Permanent Secretary Sara Danius.

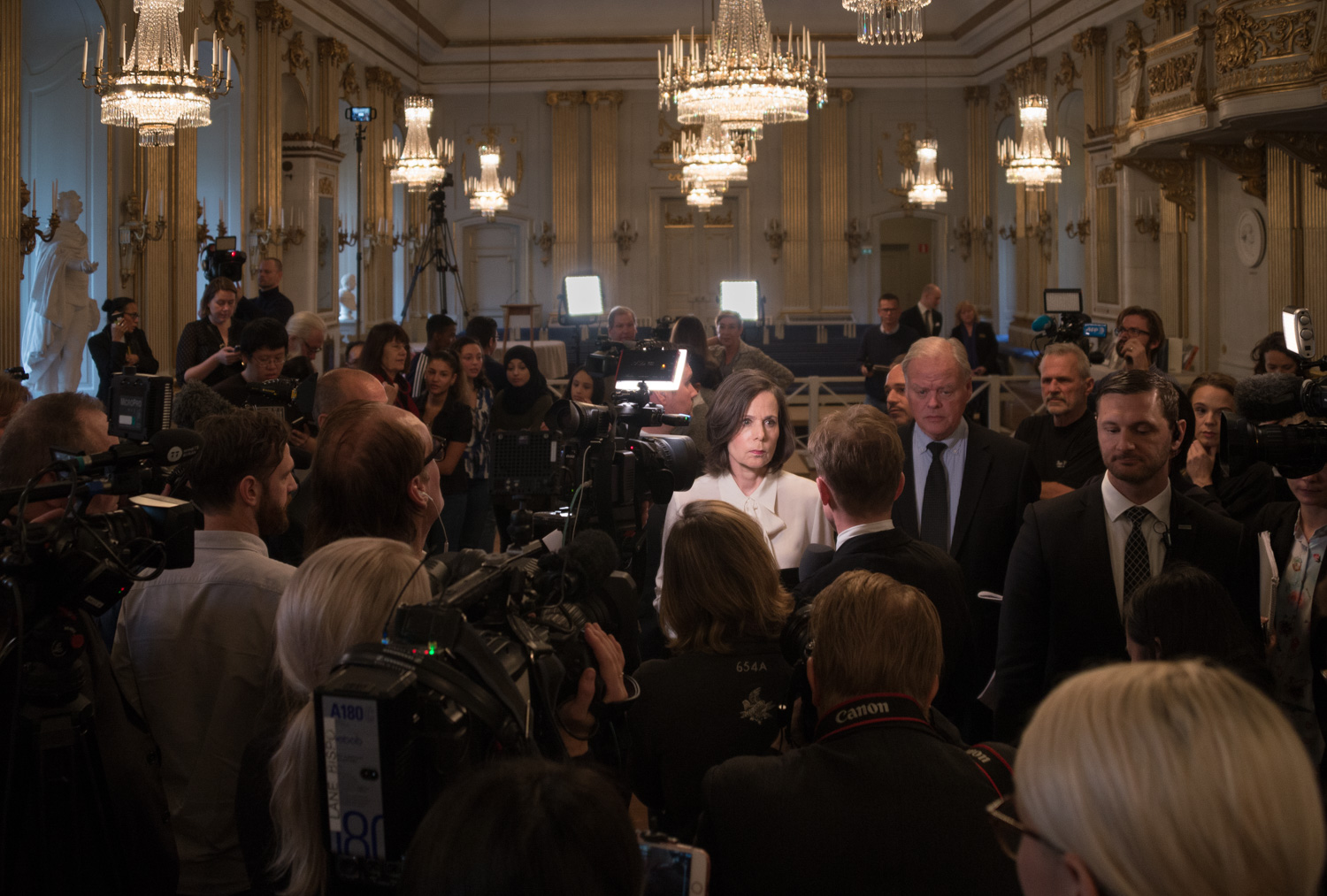

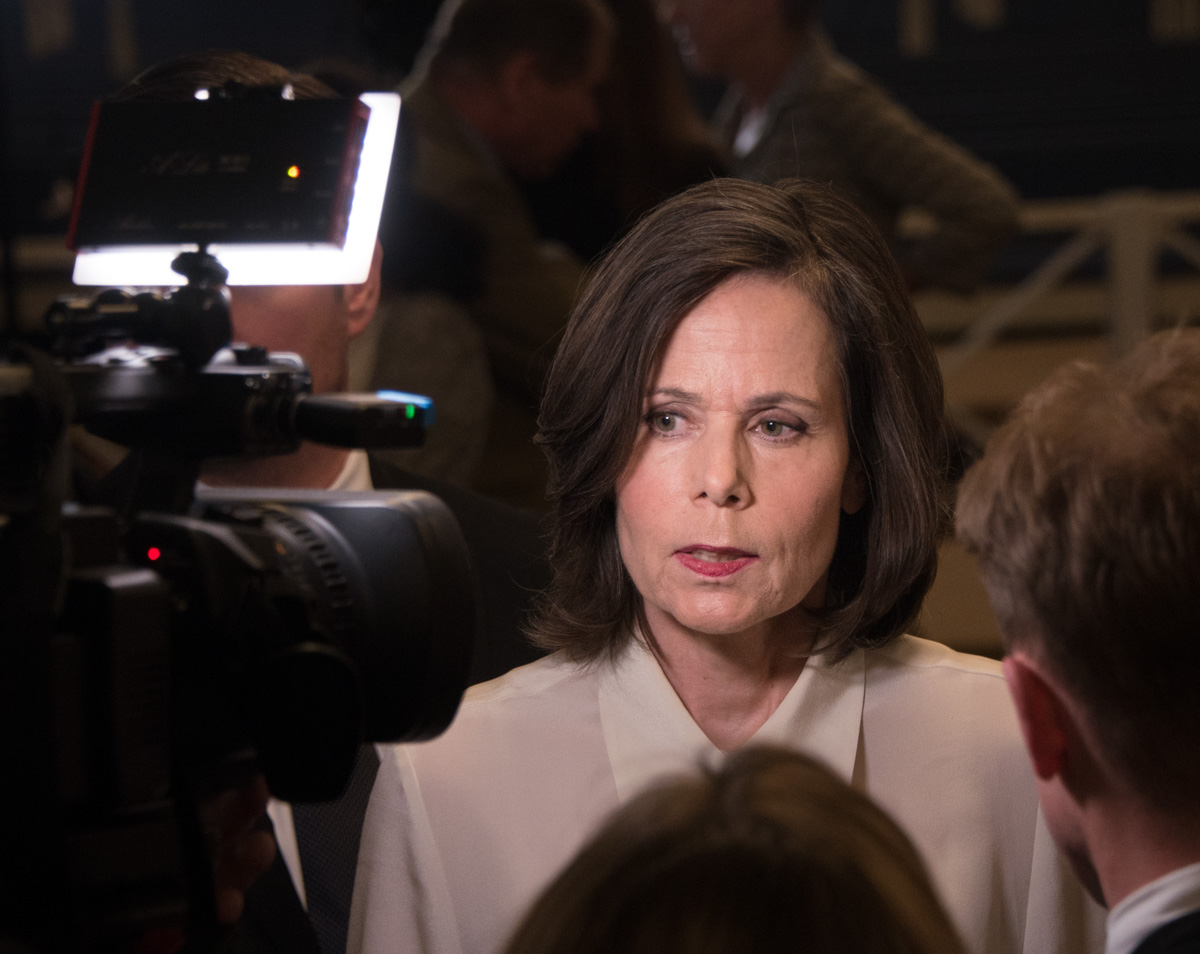

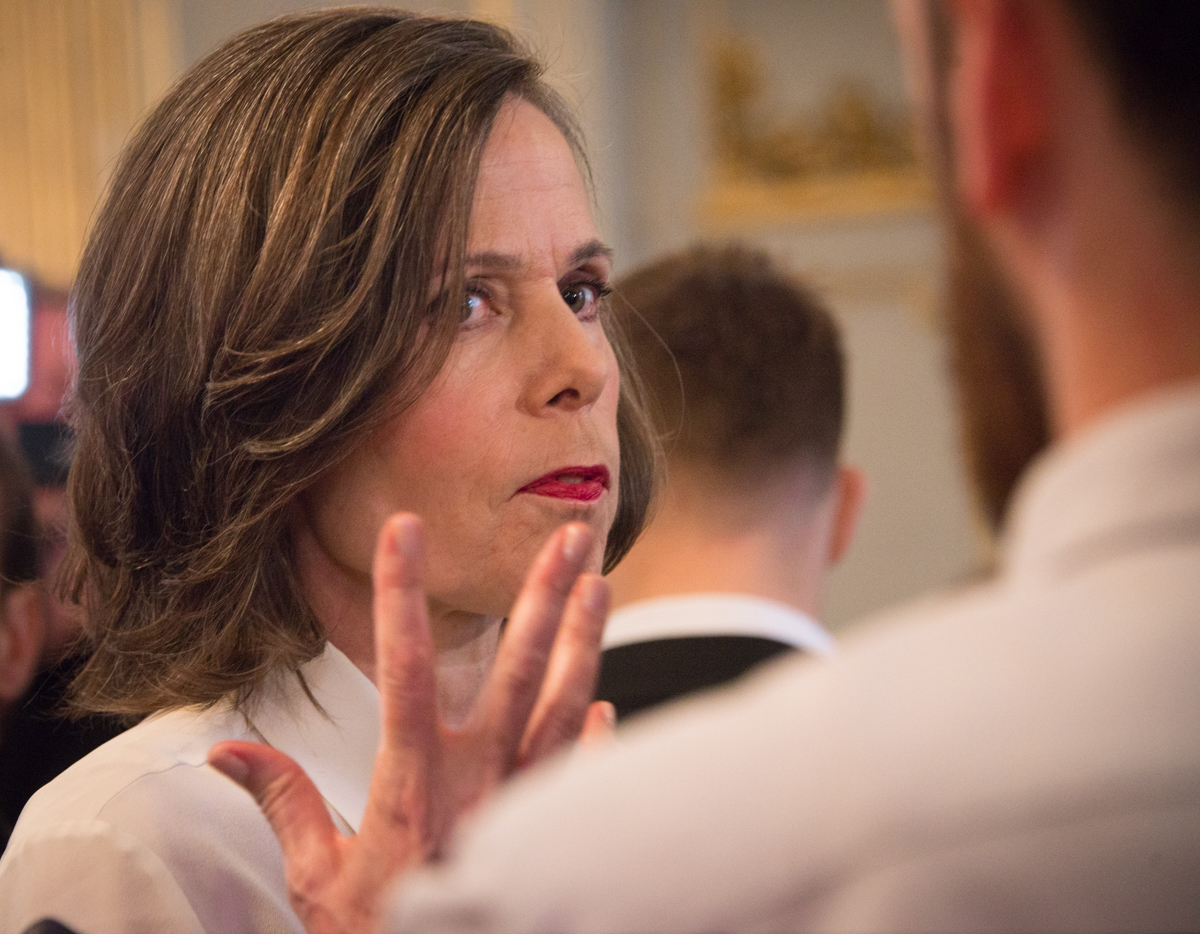

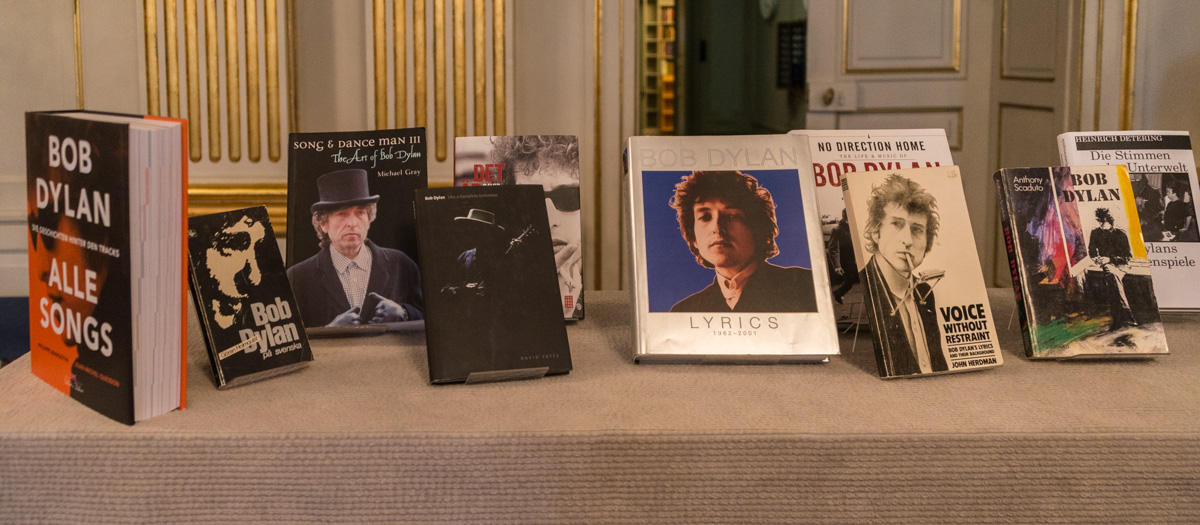
