= 2025 Nobel Prize in Literature =

Award

- László Krasznahorkai
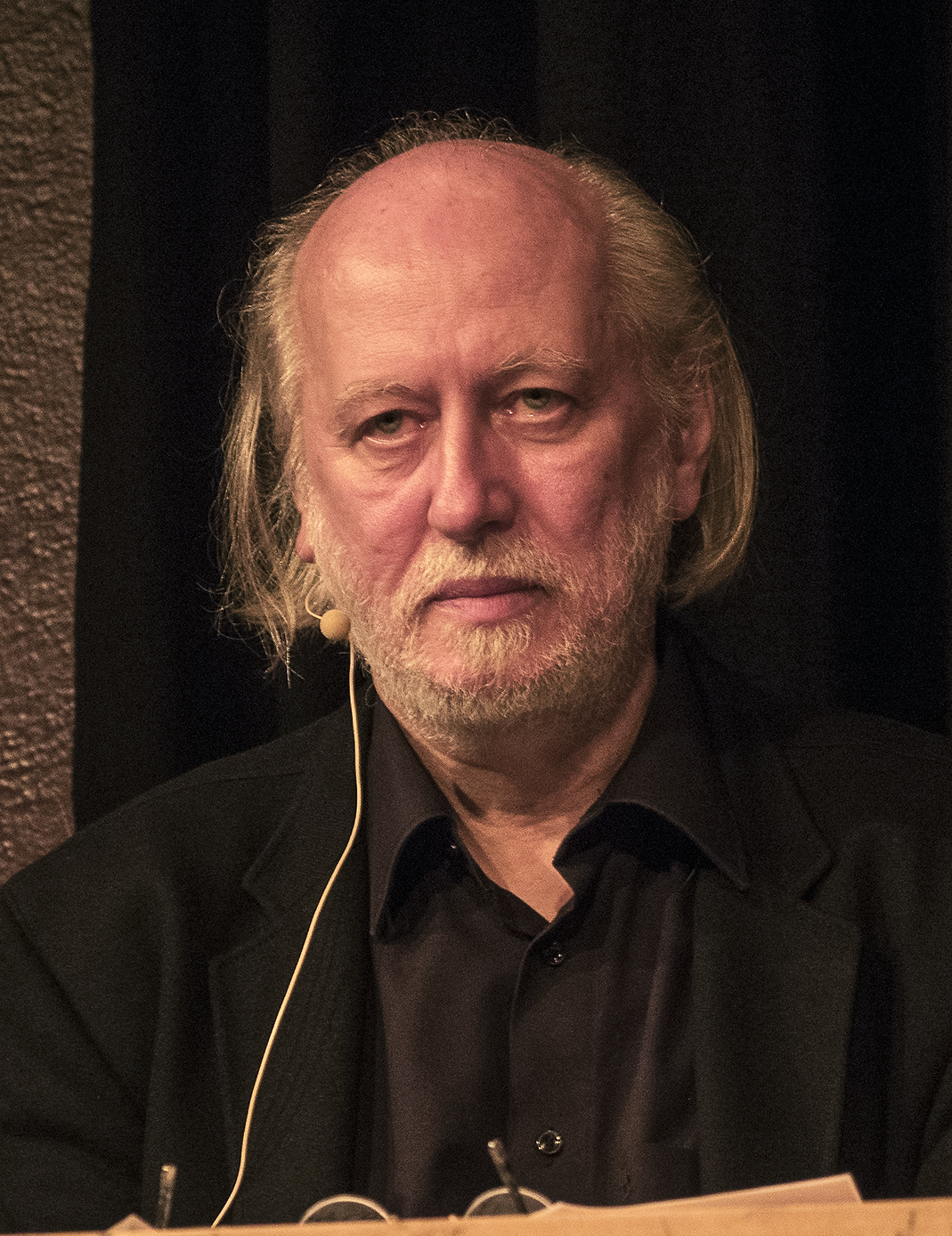
- "for his compelling and visionary oeuvre that, in the midst of apocalyptic terror, reaffirms the power of art."
- Date: 9 October 2025 (announcement); 10 December 2025 (ceremony)
- Location: Stockholm, Sweden
- Presented by: Swedish Academy
- First award: 1901
- Website: 2025 Nobel Prize in Literature

The 2025 Nobel Prize in Literature was awarded to the Hungarian novelist László Krasznahorkai (born 1954) "for his compelling and visionary oeuvre that, in the midst of apocalyptic terror, reaffirms the power of art." He is the second Hungarian Nobel laureate in Literature after Imre Kertész in 2002.

== Laureate ==
A Hungarian novelist and screenwriter known for his dense, philosophical prose and apocalyptic vision of modern life, Krasznahorkai gained international recognition with his debut novel Satantango (1985), a haunting portrayal of decay and despair in a collapsing village, later adapted into a film by Béla Tarr. His writing often explores chaos, isolation, and the search for meaning in an unstable world.

Among his works are The Melancholy of Resistance (1989), War and War (1999), and Seiobo There Below (2008), which won the Best Translated Book Award. His collaborations with Béla Tarr, particularly Werckmeister Harmonies, introduce his work to global audiences. Krasznahorkai’s style is characterized by long, winding sentences and profound reflection—has been noted by critics for its distinctive approach.

== Pre-announcement speculations ==
László Krasznahorkai was one of the favourites to win the 2025 Nobel Prize in Literature along with Chinese author Can Xue, Canadian Margaret Atwood, Japanese Haruki Murakami and Salman Rushdie. Other possible candidates speculated about in the media and appearing on betting lists included Australian Gerald Murnane, Hungarian Péter Nádas, American Thomas Pynchon, Canadian Anne Carson, Spanish Enrique Vila-Matas, French Michel Houellebecq, Romanian Mircea Cărtărescu, Indian Amitav Ghosh, Argentinian César Aira, Australian Alexis Wright, Mexican Cristina Rivera Garza, Swiss Christian Kracht, Chilean Raul Zurita, and the Antigua born Jamaica Kincaid.

== Reactions ==
Writing for The Atlantic, Walt Hunter said: "László Krasznahorkai is unusually experimental for a Nobel Prize winner, but in an unstable world, his selection feels perfectly timely."

"Krasznahorkai richly deserves the prize", novelist Hari Kunzru said. “He has a reputation as an austere figure of European high culture, and indeed some of his work is uncompromisingly bleak and difficult, but he’s also a curious, playful and very funny writer."

== Award ceremony speech ==
At the award ceremony in Stockholm on 10 December 2025, chair of the Swedish Academy's Nobel committee Anders Olsson said:

Krasznahorkai’s signature as a writer is a flowing syntax that encompasses both weightiness and lightness, melancholy and elation, tall tales and poetic intensity [...] It is László Krasznahorkai’s greatness as a writer to have succeeded in combining an artistic gaze, entirely free of illusion, that sees through the fragility of the orders established by man, with an unwavering faith in the power of literature.

== Nobel Committee ==
The 2025 Nobel Committee consists of the following members:

Committee Members
Seat No.	Picture	Name	Elected	Position	Profession
4		Anders Olsson (b. 1949)	2008	committee chair	literary critic, literary historian
11		Mats Malm (b. 1964)	2018	associate member permanent secretary	translator, literary historian, editor
9		Ellen Mattson (b. 1963)	2019	member	novelist, essayist
14		Steve Sem-Sandberg (b. 1958)	2021	member	journalist, author, translator
13		Anne Swärd (b. 1969)	2019	member	novelist
16		Anna-Karin Palm (b. 1961)	2023	associate member	novelist, culture writer
