= Baron Wenckheim's Homecoming =

2016 novel by László Krasznahorkai

- First edition cover (Hungary)
- Author: László Krasznahorkai
- Original title: Báró Wenckheim hazatér
- Translator: Ottilie Mulzet
- Language: Hungarian
- Genre: Experimental
- Set in: Hungary
- Publisher: Magvető
- Publication date: September 2016
- Publication place: Hungary
- English publication date: 24 September 2019
- Media type: Print (hardcover)
- Pages: 512
- Awards: Aegon Prize (2017); National Book Award for Translated Literature (2019)
- ISBN: 978-963-14-3415-6
- Dewey Decimal: 894/.51134
- LC Class: PH3281.K8866 B37 2016

Baron Wenckheim's Homecoming (Hungarian: Báró Wenckheim hazatér) is a 2016 novel by László Krasznahorkai. Originally published in Hungarian by Magvető, it was later translated to English by Ottilie Mulzet and published in 2019 by New Directions Publishing. The novel employs an experimental structure, with pages-long sentences and unbroken paragraphs.

Mulzet's translation won the 2019 National Book Award for Translated Literature. The novel also won the 2017 Aegon Prize.

== Plot ==
The book begins with a philosophical monologue delivered by a conductor to his orchestra; this prologue is not directly related to the rest of the plot.

Baron Béla Wenckheim, a naïve and eccentric 64-year-old Hungarian aristocrat, returns to his hometown after collecting a large gambling debt in Buenos Aires, Argentina, where he was living in exile. He hopes to reunite with his childhood sweetheart Marika. However, upon hearing of his coming arrival the townspeople believe Baron Wenckheim possesses great wealth which he will bequeath to the town.

An important subplot focuses on the Professor, a philosophically inclined hermit who goes on the run after murdering a member of a neo-Nazi biker gang; another subplot focuses on the town's politics and a scandal that ensues when a local newspaper publishes a ranting denunciation of Hungary.

== Background ==
In an interview with Asymptote, Krasznahorkai described the novel as a "cadenza" for his previous novels. In an interview with The Paris Review, Krasznahorkai explained:

I've said it a thousand times that I always wanted to write just one book. I wasn't satisfied with the first, and that's why I wrote the second. I wasn’t satisfied with the second, so I wrote the third, and so on. Now, with Baron, I can close this story. With this novel I can prove that I really wrote just one book in my life. This is the book—Satantango, Melancholy, War and War, and Baron. This is my one book.

As with Sátántangó, The Melancholy of Resistance, and War and War, Baron Wenckheim's Homecoming features a small Hungarian town which mirrors Krasznahorkai's hometown Gyula.

== Style ==
The novel employs an experimental structure, with pages-long sentences and unbroken paragraphs.

== Publication ==
The novel was published in Hungarian by Magvető in September 2016. It was translated into English by Ottilie Mulzet and published on 24 September 2019 by New Directions Publishing.

== Reception ==
A Publishers Weekly reviewer was enthusiastic, comparing it to Krasznahorkai's Sátántangó and writing, "This vortex of a novel compares neatly with Dostoevsky and shows Krasznahorkai at the absolute summit of his decades-long project."

Kirkus Reviews gave the novel a positive review, writing, "A challenge for readers unused to endless sentences and unbroken paragraphs but worth the slog for its wealth of ideas."

Writing for The Paris Review, Dustin Illingworth praised the novel, writing, "Baron Wenkcheim's Homecoming is a fitting capstone to Krasznahorkai's tetralogy, one of the supreme achievements of contemporary literature. Now seems as good a time as any to name him among our greatest living novelists."

Andrew Singer of Trafika Europe, published in World Literature Today, gave the novel a mixed review, criticizing its prose structure and concluding, "there are even startlingly wise lessons hiding in this work—yet the overall execution feels lazy, like a draft."
