= Chasing Homer =

2019 novella by László Krasznahorkai

- Book cover
- Author: László Krasznahorkai
- Original title: Mindig Homérosznak
- Translator: John Batki
- Illustrator: Max Neumann
- Language: Hungarian
- Publisher: Magvető
- Publication date: 8 October 2019
- Publication place: Hungary
- English publication date: 2 November 2021
- Pages: 96
- ISBN: 978-963-14-3879-6

Chasing Homer (Hungarian: Mindig Homérosznak) is a 2019 novella by the Hungarian writer László Krasznahorkai. It is about an unnamed man on the run from mysterious pursuers along the Adriatic coast. The book was published with original illustrations by Max Neumann and a music score by Miklos Szilveszter.

== Plot ==
The story is told by an unnamed man who says that neither past nor future exist, only the present. The only detail revealed about his past is that he has studied "Old High German and Ancient Persian and Latin and Hebrew" as well as "Mandarin and Japanese of the Heian era". He is on the run from men who want to kill him, but the identities and motives of the pursuers are never explained. The man describes his survival techniques and episodes where he nearly was caught, but got away by hiding or moving in an unexpected direction. Along with the chase stories are musings on subjects such as experiments on mice, mathematics and crowd manipulation. The man's travels along the Adriatic coast takes him to a guided tourist trip on the island of Mljet in Croatia, which according to local legend is the island of Calypso in Homer's Odyssey.

== Publication ==
Magvető published Chasing Homer in Hungarian as Mindig Homérosznak on 8 October 2019. Each of the 19 chapters comes with an original illustration by Max Neumann and a track from a percussion-based soundtrack composed by Miklos Szilveszter, accessible through a QR code at the chapter's start. The book was translated to English by John Batki and published by New Directions Publishing on 2 November 2021.

== Reception ==
Ágnes Bonivárt of Litera.hu said Chasing Homer showcases Krasznahorkai's ability to make things appear easy before becoming complicated a few sentences later. She described the story as a framework that receives more intensity from Neumann's pictures and Szilveszter's music. References to Homer add another layer and function as "more of a collapsed pillar than a support". In World Literature Today, Elaine Margolin called the book entrancing, described Neumann's paintings as melancholic and hard to decipher, and said the music adds to the text's "apocalyptic tension". She wrote that the one reference to old languages may represent "the faintest drops of some sort of latent elitism for an earlier time".

Publishers Weekly described the book as a cross between a Jean-Claude Van Damme film and the works of Samuel Beckett and Franz Kafka, writing that the English translation "exquisitely captures the grace underlying the hero's frenetic mindset". Kirkus Reviews called the book "a postmodern study of alienation and exile" and "a brilliant work that proves the adage that even paranoiacs have enemies".
