= Batki =

Batki is a surname. Notable people with the surname include:

- John Batki (born 1942), American short story writer, poet, and translator
- Noemi Batki (born 1987), Hungarian-born Italian former diver
