= Destruction and Sorrow Beneath the Heavens =

2004 book by László Krasznahorkai

- First edition cover (Hungary)
- Author: László Krasznahorkai
- Original title: Rombolás és bánat az Ég alatt
- Translator: Ottilie Mulzet
- Language: Hungarian
- Publisher: Magvető
- Publication date: January 2004
- Publication place: Hungary
- English publication date: 2016
- Pages: 312
- ISBN: 9789631423785

Destruction and Sorrow Beneath the Heavens (Hungarian: Rombolás és bánat az Ég alatt) is a 2004 book by the Hungarian writer László Krasznahorkai. The narrator, László Stein, travels in China in search of examples of classical Chinese culture and understanding how contemporary Chinese society relates to it. An English translation by Ottilie Mulzet was published in 2016.

== Reception ==
In the Los Angeles Review of Books, Michael LaPointe wrote that "Krasznahorkai channels the works of W.G. Sebald, who saw ashes on every attraction, and — unexpectedly — the novels of Michel Houellebecq, which trace the extension of the domain of the market into the sacred realms of human experience". Publishers Weekly called the book an "occasionally frustrating yet often dazzling travel memoir".
