= Kristóf Csillik =

Hungarian poet and lawyer (born 1994)

- Born: 1994 (age 31–32); Budapest, Hungary
- Education: Eötvös Loránd University (Bachelors in Media and Communications, PhD in Law)
- Occupations: Poet, lawyer

Kristóf Csillik (born 1994) is a Hungarian poet and lawyer, who is best known for his debut poetry collection Hüllők időszaka (2017), published by Fiatal Írók Szövetsége (FISZ). His work has been featured in major Hungarian literary journals, including Art7, Litera, FÉLOnline, Kortárs Online, Kulter, Műút Portál, and ÚjNautilus.

== Early life and education ==
Csillik was born in 1994 in Budapest. He studied Media and Communications at Eötvös Loránd University (ELTE), where he subsequently pursued a PhD in Law as well.

== Literary career and style ==
Csillik's debut collection received significant critical attention, particularly for the epic poem "Domborzatot". The poem features a character named Vrabély, who serves as a Virgil-like guide in a modern variation of Dante Alighieri's Inferno. Describing a pilgrimage from Budapest to the borders of Hungary, "Domborzatot" has drawn comparisons to the work of Lajos Kassák. Critics, including Renátó Fehér and Petar David, have noted parallels between Csillik's geographic explorations and Kassák's famous poetic account of his walk from Budapest to Paris.

In addition to the influence of Kassák, David identifies recurring references to Attila József within Csillik's verse, suggesting a deep intertextual dialogue with the late poet's legacy. On April 11, 2016 – National Hungarian Poetry Day and the anniversary of Attila József's death – Csillik was highlighted as a standout contemporary voice by Litera magazine.

In the journal Apokrif, literary critic Nóra Szendi commented on the love poems in the collection, describing them as filled with "youthful exuberance".

== Media and performances ==
Csillik has performed his poetry across Hungary and has engaged in literary discussions on channels like Tilos Rádió, where he has discussed topics like Elemér Hankiss's Emberi Kaland and the collection Halotti Pompa by the late poet Szilárd Borbély. In November 2016, a solo evening of his works was organized at the RS9 Theater as part of the FÉLOnline presents series.

== Bibliography ==
- Hüllők időszaka (The Era of Reptiles), FISZ, 2017. ISBN 9789638941887.
