= Ottilie Mulzet =

Literary translator (born 1960)

Ottilie Mulzet (born July, 1960 in Toronto) is a literary translator of Hungarian poetry and prose whose work has been recognized with several major literary awards.

She is known in particular for her translations of several books by László Krasznahorkai. Her translation of Krasznahorkai's novel Seiobo There Below won the Best Translated Book Award in 2014. She was also awarded the 2015 Man Booker International Prize for her work on Krasznahorkai together with George Szirtes, who translated Krasznahorkai's novel Satantango. Other Krasznahorkai titles Mulzet has translated include Destruction and Sorrow beneath the Heavens and Animalinside. She has also translated books by Szilárd Borbély (including Berlin-Hamlet, which was shortlisted for both the National Translation Award and the Best Translated Book Award in 2017) and Gábor Schein. Mulzet won the 2019 National Book Award for Translated Literature for her translation of Baron Wenckheim's Homecoming, by László Krasznahorkai.

She lives in Prague.
