= Seiobo There Below =

2008 novel by László Krasznahorkai

- First edition cover
- Author: László Krasznahorkai
- Original title: Seiobo járt odalent
- Translator: Ottilie Mulzet
- Language: Hungarian
- Publisher: Magvető
- Publication date: 2008
- Publication place: Hungary
- English publication date: 2013
- Pages: 426
- ISBN: 9789631426601

Seiobo There Below (Hungarian: Seiobo járt odalent) is a 2008 novel by the Hungarian writer László Krasznahorkai. It has an episodic narrative which focuses on artists of different times and places, some of which are historical people and some of which are fictional. A thematic link between the episodes can be seen in the Japanese goddess Seiobo who appears in one of the chapters of the novel. The 17 chapters are numbered according to the Fibonacci sequence, beginning with 1 and ending with 2584.

The English translation by Ottilie Mulzet received the Best Translated Book Award in 2014.

== Synopsis ==
=== 1. Kamo-Hunter ===
An Ooshirosagi stands motionless in the Kamo River waiting to spear its fish. Its intense beauty goes unnoticed, but if it were to be seen at the moment of striking, it could change the life of the witness. The chapter moves between the heron and meditation on the larger city of Kyoto itself, and its unnoticed beauties.

=== 2. The Exiled Queen ===
This chapter is a telling of the story of Vashti, the commission and painting of a set of wedding trunks by Filippino Lippi that include Queen Vashti Leaves the Royal Palace (1480), and the history of the trunks since then. The Queen's beauty is so coveted and awesome that she is able to break from many queenly traditions, but ultimately her disobedience as a woman leads to her exile. Filippino is a precocious young painter who impresses the Jewish family commissioning the wedding trunks depicting the story of the Book of Esther. Between the two trunks, he paints five out of the six in the style of the workshop's master Sandro Botticelli. The last panel, he paints Queen Vashti Leaves the Royal Palace, which leaves Botticelli speechless, in awe of its matchless beauty. In the proceeding centuries the painting is alternately attributed to Botticelli or Lippi. The trunks are dismembered, with panels spread across many collections and museums. Scholars argue over the sourcing and authorship of the paintings, with little consideration to their beauty.

=== 3. The Preservation of a Buddha ===
In Inazawa, the Amida Buddha of the temple Zengen-ji needs restoration. The 14th century wooden statue, famous for its half-lidded eyes, has worn over the centuries, so the abbot decides it finally must be attended to. The removal ritual is performed in secret by four monks while the rest of the monastery is eating, away from the hondō, where they can no longer try to eavesdrop on the Hakken Kuyo ritual. The Buddha is crated and delivered to Bujutsu-in, a conservation workshop run by Fujimori Seiichi. Though of great interest to the conservators, the statue remains untouched in the workshop before it is unpacked and documented fastidiously in the Blue Dossier by Fujimori. The statue is disassembled and cleaned, first with sanitizing gas, then by the restorative techniques of the various technicians. It is a delicate process to deal with valuable and significant art. Fujimori assures the conservators that, though the work is in pieces, its whole is not in pieces, for the famous half-lidded eyes reside in their soul, and should they do their duty, the Zengen-ji Amida will be whole again. The restoration of the eyes falls on the youngest employee, Koinomi Shunzo, who is hounded at all times by Master Fujimori. When Koinomi says the eyes are complete, a stunned Fujimori agrees, and the work on the rest of the pieces quickens. Finally, the Zengen-ji Amida is reassembled and whole again, and the beauty and power of the statue and its famous half-lidded eyes are unlike anything the workshop has ever experienced, bowing even Master Fujimori.

The return and unveiling of the statue to the monastery mirrors its preservation. The abbot has been hard at work preparing the monks for the public ritual of the return of the Buddha to the monastery, the kaigen shiki. The entire monastery being cleaned, the Buddha, still shrouded, returns by truck. Accordingly, the public amasses to participate in the kaigen shiki, led by the abbot of Zengen-ji and two visiting abbots. The ritual involves cleansing incense, chanting, music and prayer. The repetitions of the ritual build, bringing everyone to the heights of anticipation for the revealing of the Buddha. The crowd is instructed to bring their own Buddhas into their hearts, and here even nonbelievers feel a shift in the room, as something more is now present. At the culmination of the ritual, after hours of standing, kneeling, chanting, and praying, the Amida Buddha is revealed to the utter joy of those in participation. Though its beauty is undeniable, the ritual continues, and the abbot of Zengen-ji is fixated on the mistakes the monks make in their performance of the kaigen shiki. Finally, with the crowd dispersed, the abbot is walking alone when he feels a tired calm wash over him, and is propelled to the hondō. Here he sits on the step, doing nothing, watching an ant crawl.

=== 5. Cristo Morto ===
An unnamed Eastern European is walking through Venice on his way to Scuola Grande di San Rocco wearing a pair of black shoes outfitted with loud heel taps when he notices that a slim, S-shaped man in a pink shirt may be following him. Increasingly alarmed, he eventually finds a seat in the sun in front of Santa Maria Gloriosa dei Frari. The pink-shirted man stops for a drink across the plaza and reads a newspaper with a headline that says "HELL REALLY EXISTS." Standing in front of the S. Rocco, the scene shifts.

There is an unnamed painting of Christ with unclear authorship. There was debate over the past century, but ultimately consensus comes to Giovanni Bellini as the artist. The painting, which had been stolen for a period and restored with lacquer by an amateur, was restored to full glory by a Mr. Arlango, who, during the course of restoration, discovered a hidden authorship mark by Vittore Belliniano (aka Matteo di Vittore), a Bellini apprentice. Dr. Chiari, the art historian responsible for the painting, declares that Belliniano discovered a canvas by his master with Christ's painted face, but finished it and left it unmarked so as to pass off as a Bellini. Cleaned and restored, Dr. Chiari moves the painting to a new, more prominent position. However, the discovery of the painter goes unremarked by the art history community.

Eleven years before the man walks through Venice with his heel taps, he is visiting Venice the first time. He convinces his group to head towards the S. Rocco so he can see the massive paintings by Tintoretto. He is unimpressed until he stumbles on the staircase and the Albergo where the most famous paintings, including The Crucifixion, reside. Dizzied by the intense beauty, he sits in a folding chair to regain his composure. A security guard confronts him and shadows him for the rest of the visit, ignored by the man. In the corner of the Albergo, he sees a small painting of Dead Christ. He is completely absorbed in the painting, particularly with His eyes. They appear to be flickering or moving, trying to open. Eventually it becomes too overwhelming, and the man flees the S. Rocco.

It is this painting he is returning to, eleven years later, with his heel taps. When he works up the nerve to enter, he can't seem to find the painting. In the room where it was housed is a large collection of Renaissance chairs, one of which is occupied by a security guard reading a book. The guard barely acknowledges the man or his broken Italian question about where the painting has gone. In the next room, however, the man sees the painting behind a marble banister. Again he becomes absorbed in the painting, and takes a seat to compose himself. This time the security guard does not budge from his spot. Finally, the man is able to look at the painting's eyes, which begin to move again. Now restored and free of lacquer, they open slowly and communicate an infinite sorrow for the world, which the man recognizes as unaffecting the apathetic crowds outside. Though he does leave Venice to return home, in some sense he will never return to a time or place before the room and the painting.

=== 8. Up on the Acropolis ===
A Hungarian man had had enough of his normal life, so he went to Athens to settle down as a sort of farewell. After the crush of the airport and price gouging taxi drivers, he arrives at the intersection where he was to meet acquaintances, who did not show up. He argues with the taxi driver, but a group of youths intervene. Embarrassed, he darts across the intersection, but then realizing that he is at a loss, he returns to where his new friends sit drinking. They try to convince him to sit and drink with them, but he demurs, saying he at least needs to see the Acropolis. They warn against it, but he sets off to struggle in the heat. Exhausted, he reaches the Acropolis, begins the ascent, but realizes he is ill-equipped to handle the overbearing heat. He begins to go blind from the glare of the sun off the white limestone surface. There is no relief anywhere from the light, and he brought no water or shade. Feet blistered and bloodied, eyes burning, he returns to his friends. Across the intersection, he sees them drinking, and realizes how foolish it was to desire anything. He plays out their coming interaction in his head, and envisions himself sitting, drinking, and watching with them, desiring nothing. He is killed by a truck while crossing the street.

=== 13. He Rises at Dawn ===
The process of Ito Ryōsuke, a master mask maker, is described. He lives his entire life in near-silence, almost always alone. He rises every day in the early morning to work until the evening on his masks, broken only by a half hour lunch. Making a hannya mask takes him a month and a half. While he works, he is entirely free of thought; he does not concern himself with the larger questions that his occasional students ask. He views these masks worn for the Noh play Aoi no Ue as wooden objects to be perfected, not by chance, but by practice and experience. During their creation, he utilizes an elaborate series of mirrors to view them and discover their flaws. Each mask is made using the same stencils, though after a point, the stencils are just approximation, and craftsmanship must finish the hannya mask. After carving the mask to satisfaction, he must begin gilding and Copper electroplating, which he then paints, and creates a custom silk bag. The larger thing he does not realize is that he is not creating a painted and carved piece of wood, he is creating a demon.

=== 21. A Murderer Is Born ===
A man full of anger moves to Spain with the promise of a job waiting him. The job posting was illegitimate, and the man becomes homeless. One day he stumbles across Casa Milà, and drawn to its appearance, he wanders inside, finding no one. Eventually he wanders into a darkened gallery unimpeded by ticket taker or guard. Inside is an exhibition of Byzantine and Eastern Orthodox art. An artwork depicting Christ particularly unsettles the man, who feels judged and overwhelmed by his presence. The scene shifts to a history of the Byzantine and Russian Orthodox development and treatment of art. The man, still in the gallery dazzling with gold and beauty, comes across a copy of Andrei Rublev's painting Trinity. Though noting the canvas's deteriorating frame, the man becomes distraught and no longer able to tolerate the art, so he dashes outside, where he sees an old man with a long beard and blue eyes the same color as the robes from Trinity. the old man begins speaking in Russian, and finds no protestation from the disturbed man. He talks about how much he knows about these paintings on loan from Russia, and how he has guarded them for 40 years, never forgetting a thing. Finally at an end, he dashes out of the gallery, once and for all. Fleeing the gallery, he feels as if he is being chased, but no one is there. His head is wracked with throbbing pain, and he is stumbling around as if intoxicated. Turning into an alley for relief, he is face to face with the three 'angels' from the painting.

The scene shifts again to the commission of Dionisy for a copy of Rublev's Trinity. Knowing the enormity of the work to create a copy of a masterpiece, Dionisy wanted to do everything from the canvas frame to the finest details himself. As head of a school, the norm is for masters to do their part under his instruction. Though reticent, Dionisy submits and allows another to create the frame from wood he chose. Other masters work on the painting under observation and scrutiny from Dionisy. Eventually he completes the copy, and it is celebrated. But by the end of his life, Dionisy rejects even the memory of the painting.

The homeless man is trying to sleep in a shelter, but is beset by visions of the angels from the painting. Passing the time one day, he sees an old man pull a knife from under his bed. Though the man cannot speak Spanish, he gets the old man to communicate the name of the knife and where he bought it. He goes to the shop and buys a sharp knife.

=== 34. The Life and Work of Master Inoue Kazuyuki ===
This chapter begins with Seiobo coming to earth, existing only in the moment, and being called to a performance for the Prince of Chu, King of Mu. There, she is incarnated in the play, and offers the Prince of Chu eternal life, and reveals to him the promise of heaven.

Sensei Inoue Kazuyuki is a venerated Noh performer, surrounded at all times by family and students. After performing he is surrounded by attendants removing his costume and preparing him for the further ritual of bowing before the crowd, and individually wishing each guest goodbye. He only wishes to be alone, but the attendants' attention is part of the tradition of the Noh, even though their movement and attention has no regard for the actual performance. Following this performance, Inoue returns to his school, Mahorowa, followed in his cab by his wives, children, grandchildren, pupils, and a guest.

In the centerpiece sentence of the chapter, Inoue recounts his childhood, word for word, as he always does. The sentence modulates between first- and third-person narrative fluidly and unnoticed. He explains that he remembers being born, unable to breathe, with his umbilical cord around his neck. His father was absent selling oxygen masks in a lucrative business in post-war Japan. Inoue was a sensitive child, crying out of empathy for seemingly minor occurrences he witnessed, like a child being afraid to swim. At some point, his father's business went bankrupt and their family was thrown into poverty. Inoue's father only sat at the window, smoking cigarettes, so Inoue and his mother made small Christmas baubles. This tedious work only provided them with rice to eat, and harmed his mother's eyes, to where Inoue was consumed with concern for his mother when he could have had a normal childhood. Their situation was so dire that Inoue suggested he and his family commit suicide together. But one day, a mangy, stray, emaciated, white dog came to his school. After a week of it whimpering and crying outside his classroom window, he brought it home, to his parents' protestations that dogs don't eat rice. However, the dog ate the rice, and soon after his father's company restarted, bringing him out of the house, and Inoue back into solitude.

To Inoue, there is either practice of the Noh, or non-practice. Even performances are no different from rehearsals. Noh is the realization of death, and that there is no tomorrow, only this moment that we should move through intentionally.

The solitude he seeks before a performance can be found in the toilet, where he finds an undisturbed moment to pray before performing the Noh, so that Seiobo may return through his body.

=== 55. Il Ritorno in Perugia ===
A master painter, Pietro Perugina, referred to as maestro, with two exceptions, has decided to move his workshop from Florence back to Perugia, Umbria after 15 years away. His four assistants, Aulista (perhaps meant to be Aulista di Angelo), Francesco, Giannicola, and Giovanni are instructed to ride in the cart with his belongings on a four day trip. The maestro's motives for moving are unclear, but one night on the hellish odyssey to Perugia, Aulista vividly recalls the presently unfinished Tezi Altarpiece, on which the maestro has only painted the brilliant blues of the Madonna's cloak. His mention of it to his companions is shouted down in the anxiety and pain of the journey.

After their arrival, the chapter shifts to when the Tezi Altarpiece was first commissioned in Perugia. Following the legalities of noting the commission, the maestro sets out to have the poplar panel made by a local craftsman, who is the first to refer to the maestro by his name, more than halfway through the chapter. The painstaking process of preparing the wood is gone through in incredible detail to demonstrate the assistants' favor with the maestro. When the underdrawing is finally to be drawn onto the canvas, Aulista is chosen to demonstrate the process to the gathered apprentices. Following this, the painting sits untouched until they have moved from Perugia to Florence, when the maestro has Aulista prepare the paint for the blue robes of the Madonna. The maestro has the workshop leave him alone for a few moments so he can secretly work on the paint, before allowing them back in to watch him paint. He leaves a small corner for Aulista to finish and date. The painting remains in this state for years until their return to Perugia, where the chapter returns to the initial timeline.

The four assistants arrived in Perugia to find the maestro already at their workshop. Exhausted, they slept for days, and awake to the new assistants and apprenticeships hired for the new workshop. The only painter they didn't know previously was a young Raphael, who the maestro took an immense interest in, and treated differently than his loyal assistants of the past decades. Suddenly, for reasons not given to the workshop, the maestro returns to the Tezi Altarpiece, working on it daily in his brilliant colors and masterful strokes. To the confusion and interest of everyone except Raphael, the maestro does not paint St. Jerome's miter, the Madonna's shirt, St. Nicholas of Tolentino's book, or St. Sebastian's cloak until the end. Aulista initially prepares the red for these items, but the maestro again asks everyone to leave for a few minutes. When they return he is already painting with the most striking red Aulista had ever seen. He is still not sure of the reason why they had to leave Florence, and why his master (and here he names Perugino for the second time), stopped painting, whether for disinterest or lack of talent.

=== 89. Distant Mandate ===
This chapter tries to find some truth about the Alhambra by asking several questions of it. First, the narrator asks 'what is its name,' which there is no answer for, because no contemporary documents exist, and many Islamic Golden Age buildings were never given names. Next, there is the question of when it was built; there are records and indications of fortresses on that spot dating to Roman conquests, but no indication of when it became the Alhambra. For the question of who built it, the widely accepted answer is that the Alhambra in its essence was completed either by Yusuf I, his son Mohammed V, or a continuum of both. But what was Alhambra used for? That there are no extant contemporary documents hides the truth. Professor Grabar of Harvard and Michigan contends that the Alhambra was not a palace, fortress, or otherwise, but that it exists for its own sake. Its walls, beauty, and architecture are all 'extant,' but they exist to be self-evident of the Alhambra.

The narrator now shifts to a hypothetical tourist visiting the Alhambra. After passing through the wall, and being asked to pay for an expensive entrance ticket, he enters and is overwhelmed by the beauty, wandering room from room. His experience, should he be attentive and aware, would be that he feels like he isn't going the 'right way' through the rooms, and that the entrance wasn't even a proper grand entrance, but rather an opening, chosen at random into a room. Each room is wholly contained and true on its own—the rooms seem not to be connected in a conscious or logical way (at least to the Western mind), but somehow the beauty of the building is greater for this. The narrator then describes the Persian girih and its influence on the stonework throughout the Alhambra, and how its collection of disparate geometrical shapes form a perfect whole that looks either simple or complex based on the viewer's distance. All of this hidden truth, all of this beauty is dazzling and overwhelming to the visitor, which must lead you to say that there is indeed truth about the Alhambra, and that that truth is the Alhambra.

=== 144. Something Is Burning Outside ===
A group of artists visit Lacul Sfânta Ana on retreat to do work, walk, and relax in peace. One amongst them appeared mysteriously, dressed in painfully dated clothes, saying a car had dropped him off at a bend in the road, and he had walked the rest of the way. His shoes were utterly worn to where the other artists wondered if he had walked all the way from Bucharest. He affirms their question as to if he is Ion Grigorescu. They give him a pair of boots they found hanging up. He spends all day seeming to do no work; he just walks around observing the other artists, not speaking a word or returning conversation. Eventually they realize he is nowhere to be found in the early mornings. After searching for a few days, they hear a faint sound from the wilderness beyond the camp. There they find Grigorescu digging an enormous pit. In the pit is a life-sized horse, galloping, baring its teeth, and foaming at the mouth, sculpted out of earth, but looking as if it were trying to flee the earth. Grigorescu doesn't notice them until one artist accidentally makes noise. To their murmurs, he says only that there are so many more of them. Together they leave, Grigorescu gives back the boots, and asks to be let off at a bend in the road, where he disappears into the wilderness.

=== 233. Where You'll Be Looking ===
The first sentence concerns how his coworkers view Monsieur Chaivagne, a 32-year veteran Louvre museum guard who watches the Venus de Milo every day. He is inscrutable and peculiar in his satisfaction and desire to guard one of the museum's most popular works.

The second sentence describes how Monsieur Chaivagne would speak to an inquisitive visitor. While giving the statue's history, Chaivagne tries to impress the importance of Praxiteles, the original sculptor, whose work is copied into the Venus de Milo. No one knows what the original sculpture looked like, let alone the Venus de Milo in its original form.

In the third sentence, Chaivagne is musing to himself while soaking his feet at home and looking at images of the sculpture. He thinks about what he would like to say to someone, but doesn't. He is empty inside, like all other things are empty in light of the work. He imagines a coworker or scholar pressing him on what he sees in the Venus, and considers that he does not see the copy, beautiful as it is, but sees Praxiteles' work through it. He sees the goddess herself through all these copies responding to Praxiteles' original conjuring. He even briefly lets himself imagine that the world has changed so much that we couldn't recognize any new discoveries about this dead god.

Chaivagne's worries disappear overnight in the fourth sentence, and he resumes his post in the corner of the room with the Venus, unmoving like the statue itself. He looks at the visitors, and looks at the goddess' eyes, not where she's looking, thinking of Praxiteles.

=== 377. Private Passion ===
This chapter, with a few exceptions concerning audience reaction, is told from the point of view of an unnamed architect giving a lecture called "A Century and a Half of Heaven" to six old women and two old men at a village library. He describes how he first fell in love with Baroque music: "Si Piangete Pupille Dolente" by Caldara was playing over a coworker's radio. To him, Baroque music is the peak of all music, which has only been attacked in the intervening years by Romantic sensibilities which take away its perfection. His bombastic style mesmerizes and exhausts the curious audience as he vacillates between obscure reviews of individual pieces to grand statements about Bach and St. Matthew's Passion. He leaves them in a daze, shouting a line from the Passion as he leaves: "mein Jesu, gute Nacht!"

=== 610. Just a Dry Strip in the Blue ===
Oswald Kienzl, a Swiss landscape painter, is standing in line for a train ticket to visit his lover Valentine the morning after learning of the death of his ex-lover and model Augustine. He is extremely agitated, wild, and intimidating to the other passengers in line, who all know of Augustine's death because of Kienzl's fame. He ruminates on the universality of death for everyone, including himself and his lovers. He protests that he is a painter of life, not death. His paintings show and celebrate life, not mere landscapes. He is brought back to an untitled painting he finished yesterday, and its simplicity and beauty. He would like to change and alter it to make it more perfect. Still he rages against the line and elderly ticket clerk who delays him. When he finally gets on the train, he is positioned to look at Lake Geneva, and he realizes that out there is the expanse containing everything within it, and he realizes the name for his painting, "Formenrhytmus der Landschaft."

=== 987. The Rebuilding of the Ise Shrine ===
Two friends, Kawamoto Akio, a local Kyoto resident, and his unnamed European friend are trying to learn more about the Ise Shrine. Particularly, they want to learn about the upcoming 71st Shikinen Sengū, or 71st rebuilding of the Shrine, a ritual occurring every twenty years. The first person they meet from the governing body of the shrine rejects them out of hand. Kawamoto is dejected and humiliated by this, and ashamed that he let the Westerner talk him into thinking it was possible. However, after the meeting, they receive an invitation to watch a ceremony called Misoma-Hajime-sai alongside journalists. As they drive through the night to a remote parking lot, the Westerner pesters Kawamoto with questions about Shinto and the shrine, which Kawamoto tries not answer because he is ruminating on how the Westerner will commit breaches of etiquette that will cause Kawamoto shame as his host. They sleep for a few hours in the parking lot, and awaken to a bustling crowd awaiting an official named Miwa, who will be their guide. They are bussed over a bumpy trail and arrive to an enormous wooden stage built in the middle of the woods, at the center of which is two hinoki trees. Privileged invitees are seated on the stage, while Kawamoto, the Westerner, and the journalists watch from the clearing. The eldest sister of the Emperor and the groups of priests arrive to their positions. To the observers, everyone appears so nervous to the point where the ceremony seems to be devoid of spirituality, and more of a series of actions undertaken with hesitance. The audience remarks this among themselves, until the woodworkers begin chopping down the trees in exactly the same way as their ancestors. One tree falls exactly where it should, and the other falls exactly where it should underneath it. An ancient prayer is read over the ceremony, and the distinguished guests leave. The Kawamoto and the Westerner are stunned by the lumberjacks' art and ask them many questions. Leaving, they are struck by the beautiful, overpowering smell of the trees.

Kawamoto is taken by the beauty for a while after leaving the ceremony. He begins to be anxious again when the Westerner wants to see more of the rebuilding. Kawamoto knows that to ask Miwa for more would be improper, and that they have already been given enough. However, he is torn between being a good host, and the external etiquette which he must observe. The Westerner's persistence pressures Kawamoto into calling, and Miwa leaves off the conversation saying that they should write to apply, and that he will let them know. The Westerner is excited, but Kawamoto can only feel the shame of asking too much. Miwa calls Kawamoto back saying that they will be able to visit the carpenters' workshop, where the shrine is being prepared to be rebuilt.

Again they drive to a remote area where they are met by an officious young man named Iida, who tries very hard to impress the importance of his station and what they will witness onto them. The first people they meet are two craftsmen, who are very aloof and do not give them any good information. The Westerner expresses his frustration, and Iida suggests they meet the foreman in charge of the camp, who has the title toryō. Iida makes the toryō seem like a demi-god who makes every single decision. Instead, when they finally meet him, they are struck and spellbound by his simplicity and knowledge. He explains exactly how he prepares for the rebuild, and how he marks and measures every cut on every piece of wood. He decides which tools are used for which cuts, and for which pieces of wood. His whole life and thought must be dedicated to his work in order for this 1400 year old process to continue. He leads them to the shops where the workers assemble the individual structures in preparation for the proper rebuilding, and then leaves them to Iida. Iida asks Kawamoto and the Westerner to join him for dinner and they do, where he rambles on about his life.

When Kawamoto and the Westerner leave the restaurant, Kawamoto breaks down and says that he's sorry for being such a poor host, and that his guest had to endure so many ills, like sleeping in the car, the secrecy and etiquette of dealing with the governing body, and the idiosyncrasies of the people they met. The Westerner is completely confused because Kawamoto had been mostly serving as an interpreter, and the Westerner had hardly seen him as a person. The Westerner, still dazed by the beauty they had seen, cannot fathom how Kawamoto could be upset after their experiences together. When they return to Kyoto, Kawamoto brings the Westerner up a mountain to show him the city below them. But when they are there, seeing the Westerner gaping down at the lights, he knows a fatal mistranslation has occurred. The Westerner will never see anything here beyond the sparkling allure of the lights and images. The Westerner, impressed by the view, asks Kawamoto that he must really love Kyoto. Kawamoto responds that he loathes the city.

=== 1597. Ze'ami Is Leaving ===
This chapter describes the exile of Ze'ami to Sado Island and the circumstances surrounding the composition of his final work Kintoosho. Ze'ami is outrageously exiled at an advanced age and forced to leave Kyoto to Sado, from which he will never return. He is forced to say his final goodbyes to his friends and family, and take a ship to Sado. The ship is delayed for several days before the weeklong journey to the island. Along the way, he is wracked by painful memories and confusion on time. Everything he passes on the shore evokes another strong memory for him.

Arriving at Sado, he tries to sleep the first night on the ground of a rocky hut. The next day he begins his journey on horseback, being led by a peasant boy. He confuses the things the boy points out with landmarks from Kyoto. When he finally reaches the temple of Manpuku-ji, he has some relief from his memory by discovering some new beauty. The local regent from Shinpo overseeing his case instructs him to work on something to keep him occupied. Ze'ami halfheartedly works on a Noh mask, but cannot finish it.

Ze'ami then asks to be transferred to the Shoho-ji temple, as he thinks it will suit him better. There he spends a lot of time at a large boulder, praying and reciting poems. Eventually, he begins to write on the rustic paper they supply him. In his confused state, he has no idea whether his writing is his own, or passages from another author. At first he struggles to set his scraps into chronological order, but eventually can recall the time of his exile. During the editing process, the work finally begins to cohere, and Ze'ami completes the Kintoosho, which shows his religious belief through the story of his exile. When the attendants discover his body between his window and bed, and the completed Kintoosho, they also discover a scrap of paper saying 'Ze'ami is leaving,' and throw it away.

=== 2584. Screaming Beneath the Earth ===
A short chapter describing how the buried sculptures of the Shang dynasty represent and guard death in a way the original artists could never have predicted. The dragons perhaps meant to scare people away from the graves are all that remain. Time crushes and erases more than anyone can imagine. Nothing remains of the graves except the screaming of these artistic works, which will be gone with time, like our memories and everything we think eternal.

== Style ==
Krasznahorkai employs long sentences that stretch unbroken for pages at a time, so that each episode is contained in only a few sentences. Some chapters begin with short dedications or vignettes that can be ironic or seemingly disconnected from the proceeding story. For example, chapter 2 begins with a complete blank crossword puzzle in Italian, followed by a description of a website update by an Australian skin care company. Chapter 3, a chapter about a statue of Buddha, begins with "For the greater glory of Our Lord, Jesus Christ."

== Reception ==
Jason Farago wrote for NPR in 2013: "The breadth of material these stories cover is breathtaking, but Krasznahorkai wears his erudition lightly. Seiobo There Below proceeds slowly and deliberately, building up from page to page until each chapter obtains an almost unbearable intensity. ... Krasznahorkai is one of contemporary literature's most daring and difficult figures, but although this book is ambitious, it isn't ever obscure. On the contrary: it places upon us readers the same demands of all great art, and allows us to grasp a vision of painstaking beauty if we can slow ourselves down to savor it." The same year, Scott Esposito reviewed the book in The Washington Post: "With Seiobo, we see the moody darkness of Krasznahorkai’s early novels becoming revitalized by the balm of great art. ... The book is an eloquent apologia for the great artistic and spiritual artifacts at a time when the world is so enamored of science and technology." Esposito continued: "[Krasznahorkai] also shows his mastery of narrative technique with stories that range from mad monologues to quiet ruminations, nimble use of the detached third person and even an essayistic chapter on the Alhambra palace in Spain — each piece wholly self-enclosed and satisfying on its own terms."
