= The Bill (short story) =

- Short story by László Krasznahorkai
- Translator: George Szirtes
- Country: Hungary
- Language: Hungarian

Publication
- Publisher: Sylph Editions
- Publication date: 2010

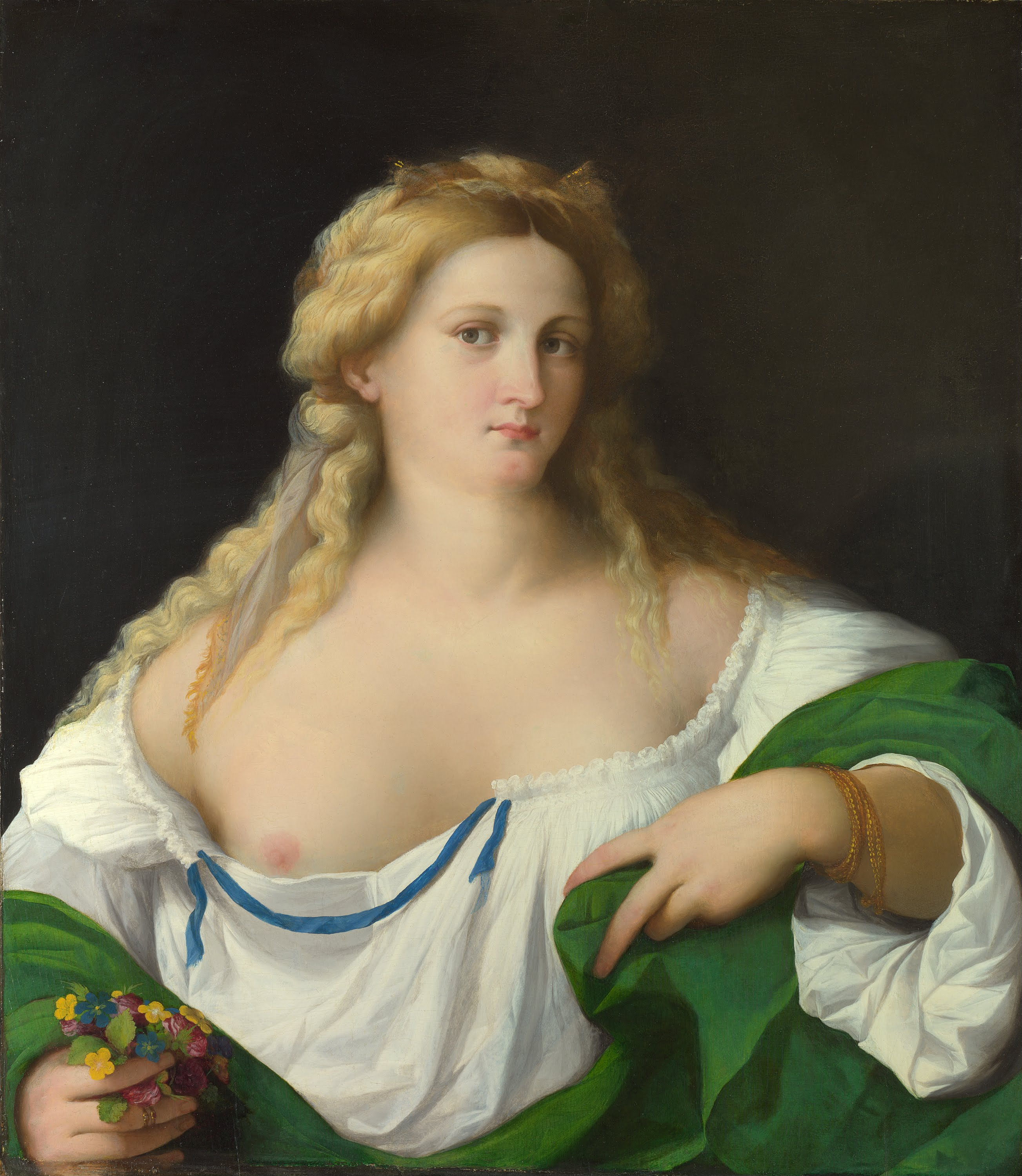
A Blonde Woman, one of Vecchio's portraits reproduced in the volume showing the woman's exposed breast.

"The Bill: For Palma Vecchio, at Venice" (Hungarian: Számla: Palma Vecchiónak, Velencébe) is a 2010 short story by the Hungarian writer László Krasznahorkai, translated and published in English in 2013. It is a single 14-page sentence addressed to Venetian Renaissance painter Palma Vecchio. The book features several reproductions of Palma Vecchio's portraits. It was translated by George Szirtes, and originally published in English by Sylph Editions, as part of their Art Monographs series.

== Synopsis ==
An unidentified narrator is addressing the painter Palma Vecchio about the way in which he paints the Venetian whores that the narrator supplies. The models are uneasy with Vecchio, because unlike his fellow painters, he does not touch or have sex with them. Instead, they remark on the way in which he unceasingly stares at them. The narrator remarks how peculiar it is that the women are portrayed in the paintings the same way regardless of their actual appearance. Vecchio paints his models as fat and blonde, and often exposing a single breast. The narrator speculates many reasons as to this peculiar behavior, but settles on a rumination that we are our bodies, and are animals trapped in minds, and that the true moment of excitement we seek is the moment in our sexual partner's eyes when they become an animal again--present in the moment and grounded in flesh. This moment of animal desire, the narrator theorizes, is the true subject of Vecchio's paintings. He makes his models so uncomfortable because he is looking past their particular bodies to find desire absent from memory.
