= John Batki =

American writer

- Born: 1942 (age 83–84); Hungary
- Education: Columbia University
- Occupation: Short Story Writer Poet Translator

John Batki is an American short story writer, poet, and translator.

== Life ==
Batki was born in Hungary in 1942, and has been living in the United States since 1957. He has taught at Harvard University.

Batki's work has appeared in The New Yorker and The Yale Review.

He has collected weavings and textiles since 1975.

== Awards ==
- 1972 O. Henry Award
- 1975 MacDowell Fellowship
- 1993 Fulbright Fellowship
- 1995-6 Fellow, Collegium Budapest Institute for Advanced Study
- 2003 Translation Grant, National Endowment for the Arts, Washington, D.C.
- 2018 Shortlisted for the Man Booker International Prize.

== Works ==
=== Stories ===
- Never Touch a Butterfly | The New Yorker | May 1970
- Strange-Dreaming Charlie... | The New Yorker | 1971
- This Life in Green | The New Yorker | 1972
- At the National Festival | FICTION | 1972

=== Essays ===
- "Alvinczi de Genere Szemere". The Hungarian Quarterly. XLIX (192). Winter 2008. Archived from the original on 2009-02-06.
- And Not a Soul in the Streets | www.hlo.hu

=== Poetry ===
- The Mad Shoemaker; poems. Iowa: Toothpaste Press. 1973.
- Falling Upwards; poems. Cambridge, Mass.: Dolphin Editions. 1976.

=== Translations ===
- Attila József (2000). "And We Still Keep Looking For Justice". In Andrei Codrescu; Laura Rosenthal (eds.). Thus spake the Corpse: an Exquisite corpse reader, 1988-1998. Vol. 1. David R. Godine Publisher. ISBN 978-1-57423-100-7.
- Attila József (1973). Selected Poems and Texts. Translator John Bátki. Carcanet Press Ltd.
- Ernő Szép (1994). The Smell of Humans: a memoir of the holocaust in Hungary. Central European University Press. ISBN 978-1-85866-011-0.
- Peter Lengyel (1993). Cobblestone. Translator John Batki. London: Readers International. ISBN 978-0-930523-86-2.
- Attila József (July 1997). Winter Night: Selected Poems. Translator John Batki. Oberlin College Press. ISBN 978-0-932440-78-5.
- Iván Mándy (1991). A Hungarian Quartet. Translator John Batki. Budapest: Corvina. ISBN 963-13-3366-3.
- Iván Mándy (1999). Fabulya's Wives and Other Stories. Translator John Batki. Budapest: Corvina. ISBN 963-13-4817-2.
- Iván Mándy (1999). What Was Left. Translator John Batki. Budapest: Noran Books. ISBN 963-9048-56-9.
- Gyula Krúdy (2000). Krúdy's chronicles: turn-of-the-century Hungary in Gyula Krúdy's journalism. Selected and translated by John Bátki. Central European University Press. ISBN 978-963-9116-79-5.
- Géza Ottlik (2004). Buda. Translator John Batki. Corvina. ISBN 963-13-5332-X.
- Gyula Krúdy (2007). Sunflower. Introduction John Lukacs Translator John Bátki. New York Review of Books. ISBN 978-1-59017-186-8.
- Gyula Krúdy (2007). Ladies Day. Translator John Batki. Budapest: Corvina Press. ISBN 978-963-13-5549-9.
- Gyula Krúdy (2010). Life Is a Dream. Translator John Batki. London: Penguin Books. ISBN 978-0-14-119303-8.
- Gyula Krúdy (2011). The Charmed Life of Kazmer Rezeda. Translator John Batki. Budapest: Corvina Press. ISBN 978-963-13-6039-4.
- Gyula Krúdy (2013). Knight of the Cordon Bleu. Translator John Batki. Budapest: Corvina Press. ISBN 978-963-13-6126-1.
- Gyula Krúdy (2016). Blessed Days of My Youth. Translator John Batki. Budapest: Corvina Press. ISBN 978-963-13-6376-0.
- László Krasznahorkai (2016). Herman. Translator John Batki. New York: New Directions. ISBN 978-081-12-2608-0.
- László Krasznahorkai (2017). The World Goes On. Translator (in part) John Batki. New York: New Directions. ISBN 978-081-12-2419-2.
- László Krasznahorkai (2017). The Manhattan Project. Translator John Batki. London: Sylph Editions. ISBN 978-1-90963123-6.
- László Krasznahorkai (2021). Chasing Homer. Translator John Batki. New York: New Directions. ISBN 978-0-8112-2797-1.
