= László Krasznahorkai =

Hungarian novelist (born 1954)

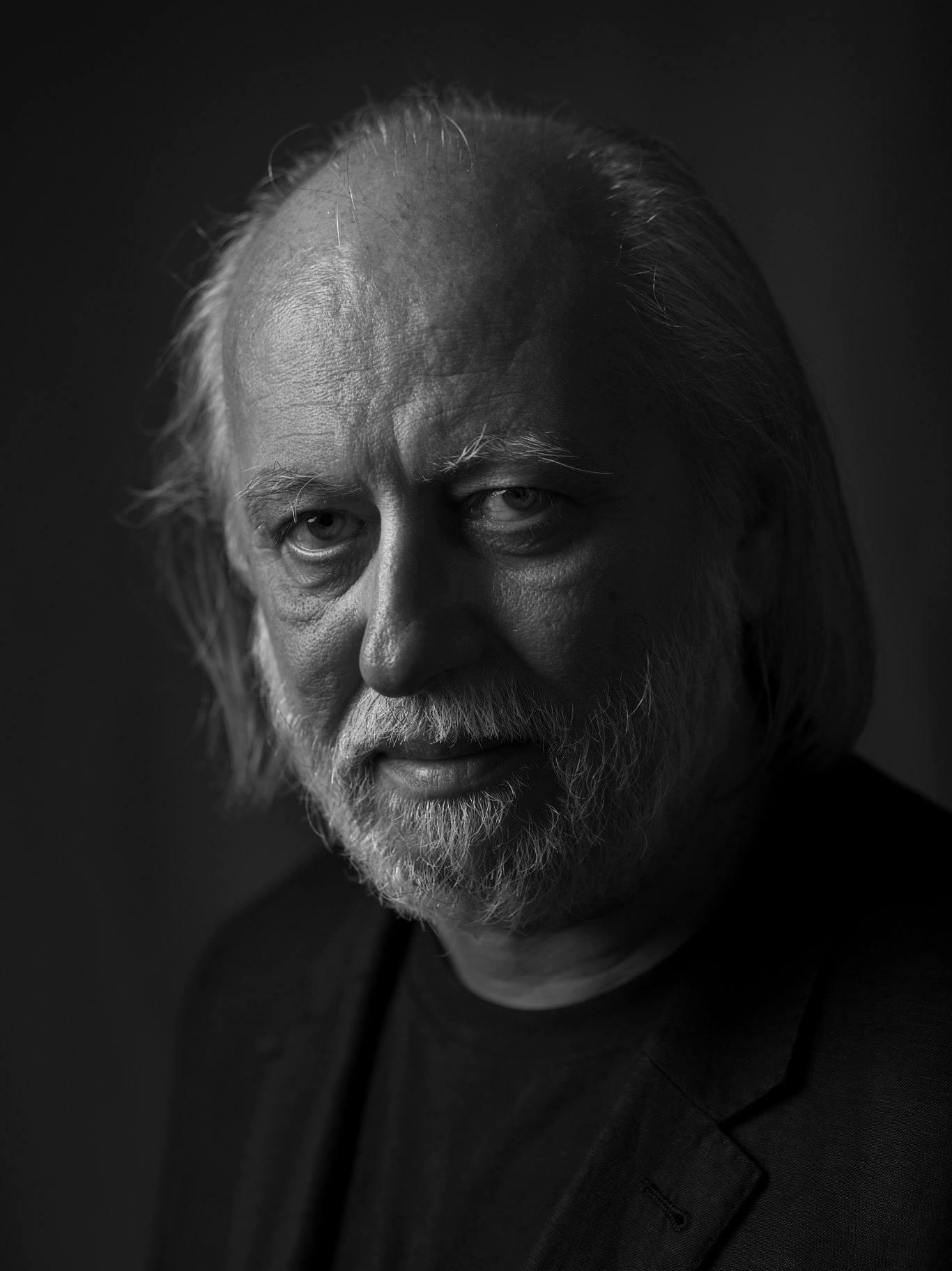
- Born: 5 January 1954 (age 72); Gyula, Hungary
- Education: József Attila University; Eötvös Loránd University
- Occupations: Novelist, screenwriter
- Children: 3
- Writing career
- Language: Hungarian
- Period: 1985–present
- Genres: Novels, short stories, screenplays
- Notable awards: Kossuth Prize (2004); Man Booker International Prize (2015); Nobel Prize in Literature (2025)
- Movement: Postmodernism
- Website: Official website

László Krasznahorkai (Note: Hungarian pronunciation: [ˈlaːsloː ˈkrɒsnɒɦorkɒi]) (born 5 January 1954) is a Hungarian writer, novelist and screenwriter. Krasznahorkai is known for his difficult and demanding novels, often labeled postmodern, which explore dystopian and melancholic themes. Several of his works, including his novels Satantango (1985) and The Melancholy of Resistance (1989), have been adapted into feature films by the director Béla Tarr.

In 2025, he was awarded the Nobel Prize in Literature "for his compelling and visionary oeuvre that, in the midst of apocalyptic terror, reaffirms the power of art".

== Early life and education ==
László Krasznahorkai was born into a middle-class family on 5 January 1954 in Gyula, eastern Hungary. His father, György Krasznahorkai, was a lawyer, and his mother, Júlia Pálinkás, was a social security administrator.

Krasznahorkai has stated in interviews he had Jewish heritage on his father's side, explaining that his father initially concealed their Jewish roots from him, revealing it only when he was around 11 years old. He has also said his maternal ancestors include Hungarian hajduks from Transylvania. His paternal grandfather changed the family name from Korim (or Korin) to Krasznahorkai in 1931. His older brother Géza is a former director of the Mogyoróssy János Municipal Library in Gyula.

From 1968 to 1972, he attended Erkel Ferenc High School in Gyula, specializing in Latin. During his teenage years, he performed as a pianist in various jazz and beat ensembles. After completing one year of compulsory military service, he began studying law in 1973 at József Attila University (now the University of Szeged), but he suspended his studies after three weeks as he did not feel a sense of belonging to the legal profession. Afterwards, he spent a period changing location every few months in an effort to avoid a second year of military duty. During this time, he took on various jobs as a stable boy, a cultural educator and a miner. In 1976, he transferred to the Faculty of Law of Eötvös Loránd University in Budapest, where he continued his legal studies until 1978.

His first published work, a short story titled "Tebenned hittem" ("I Believed in You"), appeared in Mozgó Világ in 1977. From 1978, he studied Hungarian and cultural education at the Faculty of Humanities of Eötvös Loránd University, graduating in 1983. His thesis focused on the work of writer Sándor Márai following his emigration from Hungary. During his studies, he worked at the Gondolat publishing house as a documenter from 1977 to 1982.

== Career as writer ==
Since completing his studies, Krasznahorkai has worked as a freelance writer. His debut novel, Sátántangó (1985), was an immediate success that established him as a leading figure in Hungarian literature. An English translation of the novel later received the Best Translated Book Award in 2013.

=== International travel and influence ===
Krasznahorkai first travelled outside Communist Hungary in 1987–1988, when he spent one year in West Berlin as a fellow of the DAAD Artists-in-Berlin Program. After the fall of the Eastern Bloc, he began living reclusively in various locations worldwide. His first extended trip to East Asia in 1990 profoundly influenced his work; his experiences in Mongolia and China informed the books The Prisoner of Urga and Destruction and Sorrow Beneath the Heavens. He later spent six months in Kyoto in 1996, 2000, and 2005, with the aesthetics and literary theory of the Far East causing significant shifts in his style and themes. While writing War and War, he traveled extensively across Europe and received assistance from the American poet Allen Ginsberg, whom he credited with providing valuable advice while staying at his New York apartment. Krasznahorkai was the Spring 2014 Harriman Writer in Residence at Harriman Institute of Columbia University where he taught the seminar “Artistic Collaboration in East Central Europe,” centered on his work with famed Hungarian film director Béla Tarr (Satantango, Werckmeister Harmonies) and German painter Max Neumann (Animalinside).

=== Critical recognition and collaborations ===
His novel The Melancholy of Resistance (1989) received the German Bestenliste-Prize for the best literary work of the year in 1993. In 1996, he was a fellow at the Wissenschaftskolleg in Berlin.

Beginning with Sátántangó (1994), filmmaker Béla Tarr, a close friend, adapted several of Krasznahorkai's works into films, including Werckmeister Harmonies (2000) which adapts The Melancholy of Resistance. Krasznahorkai stated that their 2011 film, The Turin Horse, would be their final collaboration. He has also collaborated with artist Max Neumann on illustrated works such as the novella Chasing Homer (2021), which was released with an original score by jazz musician Szilveszter Miklós.

His novel Seiobo There Below won the Best Translated Book Award in 2014. In 2015, he became the first Hungarian author to receive the Man Booker International Prize.

Krasznahorkai's work has received significant critical acclaim. Susan Sontag described him as "the contemporary Hungarian master of apocalypse who inspires comparison with Gogol and Melville", while W. G. Sebald wrote that "the universality of Krasznahorkai's vision rivals that of Gogol's Dead Souls and far surpasses all the lesser concerns of contemporary writing".

In 2024, the Austrian National Library in Vienna acquired Krasznahorkai’s literary archive (Vorlass), which is now preserved in its Literature Archives.

== Views ==
=== Russian invasion of Ukraine ===
Krasznahorkai expressed strong condemnation of the Hungarian government's policy on the Russian invasion of Ukraine. He described Prime Minister Viktor Orbán's framing of the conflict as an "internal Slavic affair" as morally indefensible and historically incoherent, given Hungary's own past invasions by Russia. Krasznahorkai argued that neutrality in the face of aggression amounts to complicity and likened the Orbán government's reasoning to a form of psychological denial. He characterized the regime as "a psychiatric case," motivated by a fatalistic and self-destructive logic that, in his words, accepts the death of one's own child to spare one's mother, only to result in the death of both.

== Personal life ==
Krasznahorkai was married to his first wife, Anikó Pelyhe, from 1990 until their divorce. In 1997, he married Dóra Kopcsányi, a sinologist and graphic designer. He has three daughters, including Ágnes, an actress who starred in the 2023 film Without Air.

After living for several years in Berlin, where he held the S. Fischer Guest Professorship at the Free University of Berlin for one semester, he returned to Hungary.

== Works ==
=== Novels ===
- Sátántangó (in Hungarian). Budapest: Magvető. 1985. ISBN 9789631403831. OCLC 29284187.
  - Satantango. Translated by George Szirtes. New York: New Directions. 2012. ISBN 9780811217347. OCLC 745973108.
- Az ellenállás melankóliája (in Hungarian). Budapest: Magvető. 1989. ISBN 9788009000689.
  - The Melancholy of Resistance. Translated by George Szirtes. London: Quartet Books. 1998. ISBN 9780704380097.
  - The Melancholy of Resistance. Translated by George Szirtes. New York: New Directions. 2000. ISBN 9780811214506. OCLC 1392371440.
- Az urgai fogoly (in Hungarian). Budapest: Széphalom. 1992. ISBN 9789637488436.
  - Prisoner of Urga. Translated by John Batki. London: Tuskar Rock Press. 2027. ISBN 9781806491049.
- Háború és háború (in Hungarian). Budapest: Magvető. 1999. ISBN 9789631431650.
  - War and War. Translated by George Szirtes. New York: New Directions. 2006. ISBN 9781781256237. OCLC 953225472.
- Északról hegy, Délről tó, Nyugatról utak, Keletről folyó (in Hungarian). Budapest: Magvető. 2003. ISBN 9789631423181.
  - A Mountain to the North, a Lake to the South, Paths to the West, a River to the East. Translated by Ottilie Mulzet. New York: New Directions. 2022. ISBN 9780811234474.
- Rombolás és bánat az Ég alatt (in Hungarian). Budapest: Magvető. 2004. ISBN 9780857423115. OCLC 939531610.
  - Destruction and Sorrow Beneath the Heavens. Translated by Ottilie Mulzet. Mumbai: Seagull Books. 2016. ISBN 9789631423785. OCLC 64431269.
- Seiobo járt odalent (in Hungarian). Budapest: Magvető. 2008. ISBN 9789631426601. OCLC 1289762092.
  - Seiobo There Below. Translated by Ottilie Mulzet. New York: New Directions. 2013. ISBN 9781781255117. OCLC 952667377.
- Báró Wenckheim hazatér (in Hungarian). Budapest: Magvető. 2016. ISBN 9789631434156. OCLC 1275384606.
  - Baron Wenckheim's Homecoming. Translated by Ottilie Mulzet. New York: New Directions. 2019. ISBN 9780811226646. OCLC 1154068819.
- Herscht 07769 (in Hungarian). Budapest: Magvető. 2021. ISBN 9789631438956. OCLC 1369576604.
  - Herscht 07769. Translated by Ottilie Mulzet. New York: New Directions. 2024. ISBN 9780811231534. OCLC 1423498870.
- Zsömle odavan (in Hungarian). Budapest: Magvető. 2024. ISBN 9789631442724. OCLC 1419745981.
- A magyar nemzet biztonsága (in Hungarian). Budapest: Magvető. 2025. ISBN 9789631446470.

=== Novellas ===
- 2009: The Last Wolf (Az utolsó farkas), translated by George Szirtes (New Directions, 2016; paired with John Batki's translation of "Herman" and "The Death of a Craft" from Relations of Grace).
- 2010: Animalinside (Állatvanbent), together with Max Neumann, collage of prose and pictures, translated by Ottilie Mulzet (New Directions, 2011; Sylph Editions, 2012).
- 2018: Spadework for a Palace (Aprómunka egy palotaért), translated by John Batki (New Directions, 2022).
- 2019: Chasing Homer (Mindig Homérosznak), with illustrations by Max Neumann, translated by John Batki (New Directions, 2021).

=== Short story collections ===
- Kegyelmi viszonyok: Halálnovellák [Relations of Grace] (in Hungarian). Budapest: Magvető. 1986. ISBN 9789631405811.
  - Includes: "The Last Boat", "The Bogdanovich Story", "Trapped Rye", "Heat", "Herman: The Game Warden", "The Death of a Craft", "In the Barber's Grasp" and "The Station Seeker".
- 2013: The World Goes On (Megy a világ). Translations by John Batki, George Szirtes and Ottilie Mulzet (New Directions, 2017).

=== Individual short stories ===
- 1984: "The Bogdanovich Story" ("El Bogdanovichtól"). Trans. Eszter Molnár, in Thy Kingdom Come: 19 Short Stories by 11 Hungarian Authors (pp. 64–79).
- 1986: "The Last Boat" ("Az utolsó hajó"). Trans. Eszter Molnár, in Thy Kingdom Come: 19 Short Stories by 11 Hungarian Authors (pp. 53–63); later by George Szirtes in Music & Literature No. 2 (2013)
- 1998: "Isaiah Has Come" ("Megjött Ézsaiás"). Translated by George Szirtes, included in War and War.
- 1999: "Dumb to the Deaf" ("Néma a süketnek"). Trans. Eszter Molnár, in The Hungarian Quarterly, Summer 2000 (pp. 49–55).
- 2010: "The Bill: For Palma Vecchio, at Venice" ("Számla: Palma Vecchiónak, Velencébe"), translated by George Szirtes (Sylph Editions, 2013) and included in The World Goes On.

=== Essays, interviews and other works ===
- 1993: The Universal Theseus (A Théseus-általános), three fictional lectures. Translated by John Batki, included in The World Goes On.
- 2001: Evening at Six: Some Free Exhibition-Opening Speeches (Este hat; néhány szabad megnyitás), essays.
- 2003: Krasznahorkai: Conversations (Krasznahorkai Beszélgetések), interviews.
- 2012: He Neither Answers Nor Questions: Twenty-five Conversations on the Same Subject (Nem kérdez, nem válaszol. Huszonöt beszélgetés ugyanarról.), interviews.
- 2013: Music & Literature No. 2, book length special issue of the magazine with texts by Krasznahorkai and essays on his work by Béla Tarr and Max Neumann.
- 2017: The Manhattan Project, a literary diary with a photographic essay, translated by John Batki (Sylph Editions, 2017).

=== Screenplays for films ===
- 1988: Damnation (Kárhozat), directed by Béla Tarr.
- 1989: The Last Boat (Az utolsó hajó), directed by Béla Tarr.
- 1994: Sátántangó, directed by Béla Tarr.
- 1997–2001: Werckmeister Harmonies (Werckmeister harmóniák), directed by Béla Tarr.
- 2007: The Man from London (A Londoni férfi), directed by Béla Tarr.
- 2011: The Turin Horse (A torinói ló), directed by Béla Tarr.

=== Operas based on his novels ===
- Péter Eötvös, Valuska, libretto by Mari Mezei and Kinga Keszthelyi, Budapest, Eiffel Műhelyház 2023.
- Marc-André Dalbavie, Mélancolie de la résistance, libretto by Guillaume Métayer with the help of the director David Marton, Staatsoper Berlin, June-July 2024.

== Awards and honors ==
Krasznahorkai has been honored with numerous literary prizes, including the 2025 Nobel Prize in Literature as the second Hungarian author after Imre Kertész.

- 1983: Zsigmond Móricz Fellowship
- 1987: Attila József Prize
- 1987–1988: Fellowship of the DAAD Artists-in-Berlin Program
- 1992: Tibor Déry Prize
- 1993: Preis der SWR-Bestenliste for The Melancholy of Resistance
- 1998: Sándor Márai Prize
- 2004: Kossuth Prize
- 2010: Spycher: Literaturpreis Leuk for his complete work but in particular for A Mountain to the North, a Lake to the South, Paths to the West, a River to the East
- 2012: Prima Primissima Prize in Hungarian literature
- 2013: Best Translated Book Award, winner for Satantango, translated by George Szirtes
- 2014: America Award for a lifetime contribution to international writing
- 2014: Best Translated Book Award, winner for Seiobo There Below, translated by Ottilie Mulzet. First author to win two BTBA awards.
- 2014: Vilenica Prize (Vilenica International Literary Festival, Slovenia)
- 2015: Man Booker International Prize
- 2015: The New York Public Library's Dorothy and Lewis B. Cullman Center for Scholars and Writers Fellow
- 2017: AEGON Art Prize for Baron Wenckheim's Homecoming
- 2019: National Book Award for Translated Literature (U.S.) for Baron Wenckheim's Homecoming
- 2020: Literature.gr Phrase of the Year Prize 2018
- 2021: Austrian State Prize for European Literature
- 2022: Milovan Vidaković Award (Novi Sad, Serbia)
- 2024: Prix Formentor
- 2025: Nobel Prize in Literature

== See also ==
- List of Jewish Nobel laureates
