= Reel (poetry collection) =

Poetry collection by George Szirtes

- Author: George Szirtes
- Language: English
- Genre: Poetry
- Publisher: Bloodaxe
- Publication date: 2004 (repr. 2005)
- Publication place: England
- Pages: 166
- ISBN: 9781852246761

Reel is a collection of poetry by George Szirtes, a Hungarian-born British poet and translator, which won the T. S. Eliot Prize for poetry in 2004. The collection has two parts, in a variety of forms, including sonnet and terza rima. It was praised by critics, who remarked on its emotional power and its attempts to recollect places and people in poems that use ekphrasis to incorporate and emulate elements of cinematography and photography.

== Content ==
The first part of Reel contains poems in terza rima. The opening (title) poem takes a tour through Szirtes' native city, Budapest, which he left in 1956 with his family on his 8th birthday, during the failed Hungarian Revolution of 1956. It is dedicated to his wife, the artist Clarissa Upchurch. The second poem is also a memorialization, but of a person: the German-born writer W. G. Sebald, who like Szirtes emigrated to England and like him lived in East Anglia. (Sebald was the author of a novel called Austerlitz, and the poem is called "Meeting Austerlitz".)

The second part of the collection, "The Dream Hotel", contains poems in other forms, including a sonnet sequence about getting older. One critic called these poems "human and humane". It includes three poems inspired by Sebastião Salgado, a Brazilian documentary photographer.

== Themes, style, form ==
Reel, according to Paul Farley, a poet and critic who was on the jury that awarded Szirtes the T. S. Eliot Prize, is a collection concerned with memory and mnemonics. The title poem memorializes Budapest and contains Hungarian street and place names, which Szirtes weaves into the English language by adhering to terza rima, the rhyme scheme made famous by Dante's Divine Comedy:

The city is unfixed, its formal maps
Are mere mnemonics where each shape repeats

Its name before some ultimate collapse.
The train shunts in the sidings, cars pull in
By doorways, move off, disappear in gaps

Between the shops. It is like watching skin
Crack and wrinkle. Old words: Andrássy út
And Hal tér. Naming of streets: Tolbuhin,

Münnich... the distant smell of rotting fruit,
Old shredded documents in blackened piles,
Dead trees with squirrels snuffling at the root.

The title poem, and much of the first half of the volume are in terza rima (a three-line stanza using chain rhyme in the pattern ABA BCB CDC). Szirtes commented on the form: "I adapted Dante's terza rima because it is an ideal episodic narrative form, (as in the Commedia) each verse clipping into the next, each section sufficient to articulate a central event". The tercet's episodic quality Szirtes notes is seen also by critics, who linked it to cinematography; Dave Mason comments that the collection's "first sixty pages contain poems and sequences in terza rima, often headlong, racing through ideas and images like a film unspooling".

Photography and cinema are important to Szirtes, who is especially attracted to ekphrasis, the literary trope in which a place or a work of visual art is described vividly and in detail. The title, Reel, refers to the reel used in cinema, and both the reel and the act of filming are explicitly referred to in the poems. The title poem is itself, in a way, cinematographic, since it (also) describes the city of Budapest as a movie set where it stands for Berlin. According to Farley, "memory plays out as footage", and he cites Szirtes, "bells of the city chime, round upon round. / The film rolls on. A car sweeps round the bend". The image is important in Szirtes' life and work: he arrived in England as a child with only a box of photographs, he studied painting as well as writing, and critics note the importance of the "captured image" in his poetry. In a 2011 interview, Szirtes described the visual effect of individual tercets of poems in Reel by comparing them with "a film clip that contains its own brief narrative, each episode part of a broad theme".

== Critical response ==
Paul Farley, critiquing the collection for The Guardian, praised Szirtes as a "visionary formalist". David Mason, in The Hudson Review, said "it's high time his work was better known on this side of the Atlantic". John Taylor, in a review of Szirtes' New & Collected Poems (2008), called the seven-part sequence on Sebald "one of his most moving poems".

The T. S. Eliot Prize is the most prestigious award for poetry by an Irish or English poet. Szirtes, when asked about the effects of the prize, said it brought him a lot more attention and assured him in the "poetic vocation [which] is psychologically insecure".
