= The Melancholy of Resistance =

1989 novel by László Krasznahorkai

- First edition cover (Hungary)
- Author: László Krasznahorkai
- Original title: Az ellenállás melankóliája
- Translator: George Szirtes
- Language: Hungarian
- Publisher: Magvető
- Publication date: 1989
- Publication place: Hungary
- English publication date: 2000
- Pages: 385
- ISBN: 9788009000689

The Melancholy of Resistance (Hungarian: Az ellenállás melankóliája) is a 1989 novel by the Hungarian writer László Krasznahorkai.

== Plot ==
The narrative is set in a restless town where a mysterious circus, which exhibits a stuffed whale and nothing else, contributes to an apocalyptic atmosphere.

== Reception ==
James Wood of The New Yorker wrote in 2011: "The Melancholy of Resistance is a comedy of apocalypse, a book about a God that not only failed but didn't even turn up for the exam. Less manic, less entrapped than War and War, it has elements of a traditional social novel." Wood continued: "The Melancholy of Resistance is a demanding book, and a pessimistic one, too, since it seems to take repeated ironic shots at the possibility of revolution. ... The pleasure of the book, and a kind of resistance, as well, flows from its extraordinary, stretched, self-recoiling sentences, which are marvels of a loosely punctuated stream of consciousness."

== Adaptations ==
Krasznahorkai adapted the novel into a screenplay for the 2000 film Werckmeister Harmonies, directed by Béla Tarr.

The novel was adapted for Péter Eötvös's 2023 opera, Valuska, commissioned by Hungarian State Opera. Marc-André Dalbavie's eponymous opera based on the novel premiered at the Berlin State Opera in 2024.

== See also ==
- 1989 in literature
- Hungarian literature
