= Andrea Pitzer =

American journalist (born 1968)

- Born: 1968 (age 57–58); Parkersburg, West Virginia, U.S.
- Education: Georgetown University (BS)
- Occupation: Journalist
- Website: andreapitzer.com

Andrea Pitzer is an American journalist, known for her books One Long Night: A Global History of Concentration Camps and The Secret History of Vladimir Nabokov. Pitzer's third book, Icebound: Shipwrecked at the Edge of the World, was published in 2021.

== Early life ==
Pitzer attended the Georgetown School of Foreign Service, where she says she studied nuclear negotiations and treaties. While at Harvard, she was the editor of Nieman Storyboard.

== Career ==
Pitzer was widely cited in 2019 over whether the camps where the United States Border authorities detained refugee claimants were or weren't canonical concentration camps. In particular, a tweet where Congressional Representative Alexandria Ocasio-Cortez linked to an article in Esquire magazine that extensively quoted Pitzer stirred widespread debate.

Pitzer was interviewed on All In with Chris Hayes about the Border Patrol detention camps on June 6, 2019. According to Pitzer, recognizable concentration camps were first used in Spanish Cuba, developed by General Valeriano Weyler during the Cuban War of Independence in the 1890s. She said that while the Nazi death camps were the best known concentration camps, they have been used around the world. She said she found that concentration camps were hard to close, and that authorities found them so convenient, they were re-used for other groups. She cited how French camps first used to house refugees from the Spanish Civil War were later used by the Vichy French to house Jews rounded up to hand over to their Nazi occupiers, and a camp at the Guantanamo Naval Base to house Haitian and Cuban refugees was later used to house captives from Afghanistan. She also said her book began when she "looked to see how this idea, of rounding up a whole bunch of civilians—noncombatants—and putting them in detention, without trial... How did that get to be seen as a good idea?"

Pitzer has described the internment systems for ethnic Uyghurs in China's Xinjiang province, Japanese Americans during World War II, Rohingya Muslims in Myanmar, and the immigration detention facility Alligator Alcatraz in Florida as concentration camps.
