= War and War =

1999 novel by László Krasznahorkai

- First edition cover (Hungary)
- Author: László Krasznahorkai
- Original title: Háború és háború
- Translator: George Szirtes
- Language: Hungarian
- Publisher: Magvető
- Publication date: 1999
- Publication place: Hungary
- English publication date: 2006
- Pages: 227
- ISBN: 9789631421255

War and War (Hungarian: Háború és háború) is a 1999 novel by the Hungarian writer László Krasznahorkai. It tells the story of a Hungarian man who is obsessed with a mysterious manuscript, which he decides to travel to New York City to write down and post on the Internet. An English translation by George Szirtes was published in 2006.

== Reception ==
The New Yorker's James Wood wrote in 2011: "This is one of the most profoundly unsettling experiences I have had as a reader. By the end of the novel, I felt that I had got as close as literature could possibly take me to the inhabiting of another person, and, in particular, the inhabiting of a mind in the grip of 'war and war'—a mind not without visions of beauty but also one that is utterly lost in its own boiling, incommunicable fictions, its own grotesquely fertile pain ('Heaven is sad')."
