= Szilárd Borbély =

Szilárd József Borbély
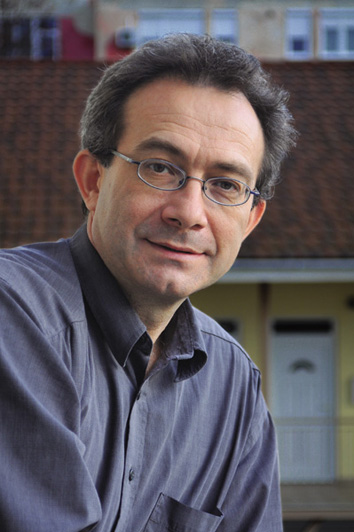
- Born: 1 November 1963 Fehérgyarmat, Hungary
- Died: 19 February 2014 (aged 51) Debrecen, Hungary
- Occupation: Academic, writer, poet.

Szilárd József Borbély (Hungarian pronunciation: [ˈsilaːrd ˈborbeːj]); 1 November 1963 – 19 February 2014) was a Hungarian academic, writer and poet. The Poetry Foundation identifies him as "one of the most important poets to emerge in post-1989 Hungary", who utilised several writing genres and predominantly dealt with subjects like grief, memory and trauma.

Borbély suffered from "post-traumatic depression", related to the murder of his mother during a burglary in 2000 and the subsequent breakdown and death of his father, who had also been attacked. Borbély committed suicide on 19 February 2014.

== Selected bibliography ==
=== Poetry ===
- Adatok (1988)
- Berlin-Hamlet (2003). Trans. Ottilie Mulzet (NYRB Poets, 2016)
- Halotti pompa (first edition, 2004; second edition, 2006; third edition, 2014)
- A testhez (2010)
- Final Matters: Selected Poems, 2004-2010, trans. Ottilie Mulzet (Princeton University Press, 2019). Selections from Halotti pompa and A testhez.
- Bukolikatájban (posthumous, 2022). In a Bucolic Land, trans. Ottilie Mulzet (NYRB Poets, 2022)

=== Prose ===
- Nincstelenek: Már elment a Mesijás? (2013). The Dispossessed, trans. Ottilie Mulzet (Harper Perennial, 2016)
- Kafka fia (2021). Kafka's Son, trans. Ottilie Mulzet (Seagull Books, 2023).
