= Literary diary =

A literary diary is a subgenre of diary writing that is read and analysed as literature. It consists of dated, chronological entries that display stylistic, thematic, or narrative shaping and that are not necessarily intended for publication at the time of writing, but are often later adapted for circulation beyond private use.

While diaries are commonly understood as private records of daily activities and personal reflections, some diaries are written with an explicit literary orientation or later edited and published as literary texts. Such works are studied within life writing, literary history, and genre theory, where they occupy an intermediate position between document and literary artefact.

The term literary diary is used primarily in literary criticism rather than as a fixed genre label, and its boundaries overlap with related forms such as the journal, memoir, and autobiography.

== Definition and scope ==
A literary diary typically preserves the diary's chronological structure of dated, discontinuous entries while foregrounding literary effects such as narrative pacing, self-characterisation, recurring motifs, and rhetorical address to an implied or future reader.

Scholars approach diaries both as historical documents and as literary texts, depending on factors such as authorial intention, revision practices, editorial mediation, and later critical reception. A diary may acquire literary status retrospectively through publication and inclusion in a literary canon, even if it was not originally written for a public audience.

== Terminology ==
In English-language criticism, the terms diary and journal are often used interchangeably in scholarly writing, though distinctions may be drawn in particular contexts, disciplines, or historical periods.

In French literary tradition, the term journal intime is commonly used to describe personal diaries that emphasise introspection and self-analysis. It is treated as a literary form distinct from autobiography, though closely related to it, particularly in discussions of self-writing and authorial subjectivity.

The expression literary diary functions primarily as a critical descriptor in literary scholarship rather than as a universally standardised genre label. Its usage overlaps with related terms such as published diary, writer's diary, and personal journal, reflecting variation across national traditions and scholarly contexts.

== Characteristics ==
Critical discussions of literary diaries commonly highlight the following features:

- Dated segmentation, with entries organised by date rather than continuous chapters.
- A strong first-person voice and a high degree of self-reflexive commentary.
- Stylistic and thematic shaping, including selection, revision, motif-building, and practices of literary self-fashioning.
- Tension between privacy and publication, as diaries may be written for private use but later prepared for publication through editing by the author or others, influencing their interpretation as literature.

== History ==
=== Early and Anglophone traditions ===
Early modern diaries, such as that of Samuel Pepys, combined personal record-keeping with narrative detail and stylistic awareness. Pepys's diary, written between 1660 and 1669 and first published in the nineteenth century, later became a foundational example in discussions of diaries as both literary and historical texts.

In the nineteenth and twentieth centuries, diaries written by authors, intellectuals, and artists increasingly entered public circulation through publication, contributing to their recognition as part of literary culture.

=== French tradition ===
In French literary history, the diary is commonly discussed under the term journal intime. From the nineteenth century onward, it was associated with introspection, psychological depth, and systematic self-observation, and was theorized as a literary form distinct from autobiography yet closely related to it.

=== Twentieth century and modernist practices ===
In the twentieth century, particularly within modernism and later postmodern contexts, the diary became a site of aesthetic experimentation, self-analysis, and reflection on the act of writing itself. Many diaries from this period were published posthumously and subsequently incorporated into literary canons.

== Critical approaches ==
Within life-writing studies, diaries are commonly discussed alongside autobiography and memoir but are distinguished by their contemporaneous, incremental composition and their openness to fragmentation and incompleteness.

Some scholars have applied theoretical frameworks originally developed for autobiography, such as Philippe Lejeune's concept of the "autobiographical pact", to the reading of diaries, while emphasising important differences in authorial intention and readerly expectation.

The diary has also been described as a historically neglected genre in Anglophone criticism, despite its widespread practice and later recognition through publication and scholarly attention.

== Examples ==
Writers whose diaries are frequently cited in literary scholarship as examples of literary diaries include:

- Samuel Pepys
- Virginia Woolf
- Franz Kafka
- Anaïs Nin

== See also ==
- Diary
- Life writing
- Autobiography
- Memoir
