= Satantango (novel) =

1985 novel by László Krasznahorkai

- First edition cover (Hungary)
- Author: László Krasznahorkai
- Original title: Sátántangó
- Translator: George Szirtes
- Language: Hungarian
- Publisher: Magvető
- Publication date: 1985
- Publication place: Hungary
- English publication date: 2012
- Pages: 333
- ISBN: 9631403831

Satantango (Hungarian: Sátántangó, tr. "Satan's Tango") is a 1985 novel by the 2025 Nobel Prize winning Hungarian writer László Krasznahorkai. It is Krasznahorkai's debut novel. It was adapted into a widely acclaimed seven-hour film, Sátántangó (1994), directed by Béla Tarr. The English translation by George Szirtes won the Best Translated Book Award (2013).

== Structure ==
The novel is postmodernist and is narrated from multiple perspectives. The structure of the book's chapters resembles a tango, with six "steps" forward followed by six backward. Every chapter is a long paragraph which does not contain line breaks. The twelve parts are titled as follows (in the original Hungarian and in English translation).

- I. A hír, hogy jönnek [News of Their Coming]
- II. Feltámadunk [We Are Resurrected]
- III. Valamit tudni [To Know Something]
- IV. A pók dolga I. [The Work of the Spider I]
- V. Felfeslők [Unraveling]
- VI. A pók dolga II (Ördögcsecs, sátántangó) [The Work of the Spider II (The Devil's Tit, Satantango)]
- VI. Irimiás beszédet mond [Irimiás Makes A Speech]
- V. A távlat, ha szemből [The Distance, As Seen]
- IV. Mennybe menni? Lázálmodni? [Heavenly Vision? Hallucination?]
- III. A távlat, ha hátulról [The Distance, as Approached from the Other Side]
- II. Csak a gond, a munka [Nothing but Work and Worries]
- I. A kör bezárul [The Circle Closes]

== Plot ==
Most of the action occurs in a run-down Hungarian village ("estate") which is in a vicinity of an unnamed town but the inhabitants are almost isolated from the outside world. The main character, Irimiás, a con man posing as a savior, arrives at the estate, achieves an almost unlimited power over the inhabitants, gets them to give him all their hard-earned money, convinces them to move to another abandoned "estate" nearby, and then brings them to the town, where he disperses them around the country.

== Reception ==
Jacob Silverman of The New York Times reviewed the book in 2012, and wrote that it "shares many of [Krasznahorkai]'s later novels' thematic concerns—the abeyance of time, an apocalyptic sense of crisis and decay—but it's an altogether more digestible work. Its story skips around in perspective and temporality, but the narrative is rarely unclear. For a writer whose characters often exhibit a claustrophobic interiority, Krasznahorkai also shows himself to be unexpectedly expansive and funny here."

Theo Tait in The Guardian praised the novel and, in particular, said that it is "possessed of a distinctive, compelling vision". He underscored the perceptible influence of Franz Kafka and Samuel Beckett on the novel.

== See also ==
- 1985 in literature
- Hungarian literature
