= Iván Mándy =

Hungarian writer

Iván Mándy (23 December 1918 in Budapest – 6 October 1995 in Budapest) was a Hungarian writer.

== Biography ==
From 1945 on Mándy worked at the literary revue Újhold. After the Soviet takeover he became a freelance writer. In 1989 he got again the chance to write for a literary newspaper. He was promoted as a candidate for the Nobel Prize in Literature in 1993 by the Hungarian Academy of Fine Arts.

He died in 1995 in Budapest.
