= George Szirtes =

British poet and translator (born 1948)

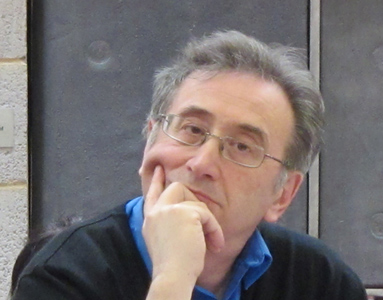
- Szirtes in 2011
- Born: György Szirtes; 29 November 1948 (age 77); Budapest, Republic of Hungary
- Occupation: Writer
- Years active: 1973–present
- Spouse: Clarissa Upchurch
- Children: 2

George Szirtes, born György Szirtes (/ˈsɪərtɛʃ/; born 29 November 1948) is a Hungarian-British poet and translator into English. Originally from Hungary, he has lived in the United Kingdom for most of his life. Szirtes was a judge for the 2017 Griffin Poetry Prize. In 2024 he was awarded the King's Gold Medal for Poetry.

== Life ==
Born in Budapest on 29 November 1948, Szirtes came to England as a refugee in 1956 aged 8. After a few days in an army camp followed by three months in an off-season boarding house on the Kent coast, along with other Hungarian refugees, his family moved to London, where he was brought up and went to school, then studied fine art in London and Leeds. Among his teachers at Leeds was the poet Martin Bell.

His poems began appearing in national magazines in 1973, and his first book, The Slant Door, was published in 1979. It won the Geoffrey Faber Memorial Prize the following year.

He has won a variety of prizes for his work, most recently the 2004 T. S. Eliot Prize, for his collection Reel, and the Bess Hokin Prize in 2008 for poems in Poetry magazine. His translations from Hungarian poetry, fiction and drama have also won numerous awards. He has received an Honorary Fellowship from Goldsmiths College, University of London and an Honorary Doctorate from the University of East Anglia. He also won the Poetry and the People Award in Guangzhou, China in 2016.

In 2019 he was a contributor to A New Divan: A Lyrical Dialogue between East and West (Gingko Library). He is one of three editors of the Poems on the Underground project, along with Judith Chernaik and Imtiaz Dharker.

Szirtes lives in Wymondham, Norfolk, having retired from teaching at the University of East Anglia in 2013. He is married to the artist Clarissa Upchurch, with whom he ran The Starwheel Press and who has been responsible for most of his book jacket images.

== Prizes and honours ==
- 1980 – Faber Memorial Prize for The Slant Door
- 1982 – Elected Fellow of the Royal Society of Literature
- 1984 – Arts Council Travelling Scholarship
- 1986 – Cholmondeley Prize
- 1990 – Déry Prize for Translation The Tragedy of Man
- 1991 – Gold Star of the Hungarian Republic
- 1992 – Shortlisted for Whitbread Poetry Prize for Bridge Passages
- 1995 – European Poetry Translation Prize for New Life
- 1996 – Shortlisted for Aristeion Translation Prize for New Life
- 1999 – Sony Bronze Award, 1999 – for contribution to BBC Radio Three, Danube programmes
- 1999 – Shortlisted for Weidenfeld Prize for The Adventures of Sindbad
- 2000 – Shortlisted for Forward Prize Single Poem: Norfolk Fields
- 2002 – George Cushing Prize for Anglo-Hungarian Cultural Relations
- 2002 – Society of Authors Travelling Scholarship
- 2003 – Leverhulme Research Fellowship
- 2004 – Pro Cultura Hungarica medal
- 2004 – T. S. Eliot Prize, for Reel
- 2005 – Shortlisted for Weidenfeld Prize for The Night of Akhenaton
- 2005 – Shortlisted for Popescu Prize for The Night of Akhenaton
- 2005 – PEN Translation Fund Grant from PEN American Center
- 2006 – Ovid Prize, Romania
- 2008 – Bess Hokin Prize (USA) Poetry Foundation
- 2009 – Shortlisted for T S Eliot Prize for The Burning of the Books and Other Poems
- 2013 – CLPE Prize for in the Land if the Giants, poems for children
- 2013 – Shortlisted for T S Eliot Prize for Bad Machine
- 2013 – Best Translated Book Award, winner, Satantango
- 2015 – Man Booker International winner, as translator of László Krasznahorkai
- 2016 – Poetry and People Prize (China)
- 2020 – Shortlisted for the PEN/Ackerley Prize for The Photographer at Sixteen
- 2020 – Winner of James Tait Black Prize for Biography, for The Photographer at Sixteen
- 2024 – King's Gold Medal for Poetry
- 2025 – Shortlisted Warwick Prize for Women in Translation, for My Secret Life by Krisztina Tóth

• 2025 László Krasznahorkai awarded Nobel Prize for Literature. Translators, George Szirtes, Ottilie Mulzet and John Bátki

== Works ==
=== Poetry collections ===
- Poetry Introduction 4 with Craig Raine, Alan Hollinghurst, Alistair Elliott, Anne Cluysenaar and Cal Clothier (Faber, 1978)
- The Slant Door (Secker & Warburg, 1979)
- November and May (Secker & Warburg, 1981)
- Short Wave (Secker & Warburg, 1984)
- The Photographer in Winter (Secker & Warburg, 1986)
- Metro (OUP, 1988)
- Bridge Passages (OUP, 1991)
- Blind Field (OUP, September 1994)
- Selected Poems (OUP, 1996)
- The Red All Over Riddle Book (Faber, for children, 1997)
- Portrait of my Father in an English Landscape (OUP, 1998)
- The Budapest File (Bloodaxe, 2000)
- An English Apocalypse (Bloodaxe, 2001)
- A Modern Bestiary with artist Ana Maria Pacheco (Pratt Contemporary Art, 2004)
- Reel (Bloodaxe, 2004)
- New and Collected Poems (Bloodaxe, 2008)
- Shuck, Hick, Tiffey – Three libretti for children, with Ken Crandell (Gatehouse, 2008)
- The Burning of the Books (Circle Press, 2008)
- The Burning of the Books and Other Poems (Bloodaxe, 2009)
- In the Land of the Giants – for children (Salt, 2012)
- Bad Machine (Bloodaxe, 2013)
- Bad Machine (Sheep Meadow, 2013, USA)
- Mapping the Delta (Bloodaxe, 2016)
- The Children (Paekakariki Press, 2018)
- Fresh Out of the Sky (Bloodaxe, 2021)
- Selected poems in Hungarian, Chinese, Italian, German and Romanian

=== Memoir ===
- The Photographer at Sixteen (MacLehose Press, 2019)

=== Translation ===
- Imre Madách: The Tragedy of Man, verse play (Corvina / Puski, 1989)
- Sándor Csoóri: Barbarian Prayer. Selected Poems (part translator, Corvina 1989)
- István Vas: Through the Smoke. Selected Poems (editor and part translator, Corvina, 1989)
- Dezső Kosztolányi: Anna Édes. Novel. (Quartet, 1991)
- Ottó Orbán: The Blood of the Walsungs. Selected Poems (editor and majority translator, Bloodaxe, 1993)
- Zsuzsa Rakovszky: New Life. Selected Poems (editor and translator, OUP March 1994)
- The Colonnade of Teeth: Twentieth Century Hungarian Poetry (anthology, co-editor and translator, Bloodaxe 1996)
- The Lost Rider: Hungarian Poetry 16–20th Century, an anthology, editor and chief translator (Corvina, 1998)
- Gyula Krúdy: The Adventures of Sindbad short stories (CEUP, 1999)
- László Krasznahorkai: The Melancholy of Resistance (Quartet, 1999)
- The Night of Akhenaton: Selected Poems of Ágnes Nemes Nagy (editor-translator, Bloodaxe, 2003)
- Sándor Márai: Conversation in Bolzano (Knopf / Random House, 2004)
- László Krasznahorkai: War and War (New Directions, 2005)
- Sándor Márai: The Rebels (Knopf / Random House, 2007; Vintage / Picador, 2008)
- Ferenc Karinthy: Metropole (Telegram, 2008
- Sándor Márai: Esther's Inheritance (Knopf / Random House, 2008)
- Sándor Márai: Portraits of a Marriage (Knopf / Random House, 2011)
- Yudit Kiss: The Summer My Father Died (Telegram, 2012)
- László Krasznahorkai: Satantango (New Directions, 2012)
- Magda Szabó: Iza's Ballad (Harvill Secker, 2014)

=== Poetry set to music ===
- The Flight, set to music by Richard Causton (composer), as a commission for A Festival of Nine Lessons and Carols, at King's College, Cambridge.

=== As editor ===
- The Collected Poems of Freda Downie (Bloodaxe 1995)
- The Colonnade of Teeth: Modern Hungarian Poetry, co-edited with George Gömöri (Bloodaxe 1997)
- New Writing 10, Anthology of new writing co-edited with Penelope Lively (Picador, 2001)
- An Island of Sound: Hungarian fiction and poetry at the point of change, co-edited with Miklós Vajda (Harvill, 2004)
- New Order: Hungarian Poets of the Post-1989 Generation (Arc, 2010)
- In Their Own Words: Contemporary Poets on Their Poetry, co-edited with Helen Ivory (Salt, 2012)

=== Recordings ===
- The Poetry Quartets 6, with Moniza Alvi, Michael Donaghy and Anne Stevenson (Bloodaxe / British Council 2001)
- George Szirtes (Poetry Archive, 2006)
