= Prize of the Ecumenical Jury =

Independent film award at various film festivals

- Logo of the Jury œcuménique
- Awarded for: Honours works of quality which touch the spiritual dimension of our existence
- Location: Various international film festivals

The Prize of the Ecumenical Jury (French: Prix du Jury Œcuménique) is an independent film award for feature-length films shown at major international film festivals since 1973. The award was created by Christian film makers, film critics and other film professionals. The objective of the award is to "honour works of artistic quality which witnesses to the power of film to reveal the mysterious depths of human beings through what concerns them, their hurts and failings as well as their hopes." The ecumenical jury can be composed out of 8, 6, 5, 4 or 3 members, who are nominated by SIGNIS for the Catholics and Interfilm for the Protestants. SIGNIS and Interfilm appoint ecumenical juries at various international film festivals, including Cannes Film Festival (where The Ecumenical Jury (French: Jury Œcuménique) is one of three juries at the film festival, along with the official jury and the FIPRESCI jury), Berlin International Film Festival, Locarno International Film Festival, Montreal World Film Festival and the Karlovy Vary International Film Festival.

== First Awarded ==
1973 (Locarno), 1974 (Cannes), 1978 (Nyon, later renamed to "Visions du Réel"), 1979 (Montreal), 1992 (Berlin), 1994 (Karlovy Vary), 1994 (Leipzig), 1995 (Mannheim-Heidelberg), 1998 (Fribourg), 1999 (de:Cottbus), 2000 (Oberhausen Kurzfilmtage), 2001 (Bratislava), 2001 (Zlín Children & Youth), 2007 (Yerevan), 2008 (Kyiv "Molodist"), 2010 (Warsaw), 2011 (Miskolc CineFest), 2015 (de:Saarbrücken Max Ophüls), 2016 (de:Chemnitz Schlingel), 2019 (Faludi), 2024 (Cluj-Napoca).

== Winners ==
=== Cannes Film Festival (1974–present) ===
Films from diverse countries have won the Prize of the Ecumenical Jury at the Cannes Film Festival. Most films having won the award are from European countries, with Italy, Germany and Poland dominating. Andrei Tarkovsky is the only director to have won three times. Samira Makhmalbaf was the first woman to win the award (followed by Naomi Kawase and Nadine Labaki). Samira's father Mohsen Makhmalbaf had also won the award. Countries that are not predominantly Christian that have won the award are Japan and the People's Republic of China. In 1998 a special award was given to Ingmar Bergman at Cannes film festival for his whole body of work.

Year	English Title	Original Title	Director(s)	Production Country
1974	Ali: Fear Eats the Soul	Angst essen Seele auf	Rainer Werner Fassbinder	West Germany
1975	The Enigma of Kaspar Hauser	Jeder für sich und Gott gegen alle	Werner Herzog	West Germany
1977	The Lacemaker	La dentellière	Claude Goretta	France
1978	The Tree of Wooden Clogs	L'albero degli zoccoli	Ermanno Olmi	Italy
1979	Without Anesthesia	Bez znieczulenia	Andrzej Wajda	Poland
1979	Stalker	Сталкер	Andrei Tarkovsky	Soviet Union
1980	The Constant Factor	Constans	Krzysztof Zanussi	Poland
1981	Man of Iron	Człowiek z żelaza	Andrzej Wajda	Poland
1982	The Night of the Shooting Stars	La notte di San Lorenzo	Paolo and Vittorio Taviani	Italy
1983	Nostalghia	Ностальгия	Andrei Tarkovsky	Italy
1984	Paris, Texas		Wim Wenders	West Germany
1985	The Official Story	La Historia Oficial	Luis Puenzo	Argentina
1986	The Sacrifice	Offret	Andrei Tarkovsky	Sweden
1987	Repentance	მონანიება	Tengiz Abuladze	Soviet Union
1988	A World Apart		Chris Menges	United Kingdom
1989	Jesus of Montreal	Jésus de Montréal	Denys Arcand	Canada
1990	Everybody's Fine	Stanno tutti bene	Giuseppe Tornatore	Italy
1991	The Double Life of Véronique	Podwójne życie Weroniki	Krzysztof Kieślowski	Poland
1992	The Stolen Children	Il ladro di bambini	Gianni Amelio	Italy
1993	Libera me		Alain Cavalier	France
1994	To Live	活着	Zhang Yimou	China
1994	Burnt by the Sun	Утомлённые солнцем	Nikita Mikhalkov	Russia
1995	Land and Freedom		Ken Loach	United Kingdom
1996	Secrets & Lies		Mike Leigh	United Kingdom
1997	The Sweet Hereafter		Atom Egoyan	Canada
1998	Eternity and a Day	Μια αιωνιότητα και μια μέρα	Theodoros Angelopoulos	Greece
1999	All About My Mother	Todo sobre mi madre	Pedro Almodóvar	Spain
2000	Eureka	ユリイカ	Shinji Aoyama	Japan
2001	Kandahar	قندهار	Mohsen Makhmalbaf	Iran
2002	The Man Without a Past	Mies vailla menneisyyttä	Aki Kaurismäki	Finland
2003	At Five in the Afternoon	پنج عصر	Samira Makhmalbaf	Iran
2004	The Motorcycle Diaries	Los diarios de motocicleta	Walter Salles	Brazil
2005	Hidden	Caché	Michael Haneke	France
2006	Babel		Alejandro González Iñárritu	United States
2007	The Edge of Heaven	Auf der anderen Seite	Fatih Akın	Germany
2008	Adoration		Atom Egoyan	Canada
2009	Looking for Eric		Ken Loach	United Kingdom
2010	Of Gods and Men	Des hommes et des dieux	Xavier Beauvois	France
2011	This Must Be the Place		Paolo Sorrentino	Italy
2012	The Hunt	Jagten	Thomas Vinterberg	Denmark
2013	The Past	گذشته	Asghar Farhadi	France, Iran
2014	Timbuktu		Abderrahmane Sissako	France, Mauritania
2015	Mia Madre		Nanni Moretti	Italy
2016	It's Only the End of the World	Juste la fin du monde	Xavier Dolan	Canada
2017	Radiance	光	Naomi Kawase	Japan
2018	Capernaum	کفرناحوم	Nadine Labaki	Lebanon
2019	A Hidden Life		Terrence Malick	United States, Germany
2021	Drive My Car	ドライブ・マイ・カー	Ryusuke Hamaguchi	Japan
2022	Broker	브로커	Hirokazu Kore-eda	South Korea
2023	Perfect Days		Wim Wenders	Japan, Germany
2024	The Seed of the Sacred Fig	دانه‌ی انجیر معابد	Mohammad Rasoulof	Iran, Germany, France
2025	Young Mothers	Jeunes mères	Jean-Pierre and Luc Dardenne	Belgium, France
2026	Fjord		Cristian Mungiu	Romania, Norway, Denmark, France, Sweden

=== Berlin International Film Festival (1992–present) ===
Year	English Title	Original title	Director(s)	Production Country
1992	Infinitas	Бесконечность	Marlen Khutsiev	Russia
1993	Le Jeune Werther		Jacques Doillon	France
1994	Ladybird, Ladybird		Ken Loach	United Kingdom
1995	Summer Snow	女人四十	Ann Hui	Hong Kong
1996	Dead Man Walking		Tim Robbins	United States
1998	Central Station	Central do Brasil	Walter Salles	Brazil
1998	Cinema Alcázar (short film)		Florence Jaugey	France
1999	It All Starts Today	Ça commence aujourd'hui	Bertrand Tavernier	France
2000	The Road Home	我的父亲母亲	Zhang Yimou	China
2001	Italian for Beginners	Italiensk for begyndere	Lone Scherfig	Denmark, Sweden
2002	Bloody Sunday		Paul Greengrass	Ireland, United Kingdom
2003	In This World		Michael Winterbottom	United Kingdom
2004	Ae Fond Kiss…		Ken Loach	United Kingdom
2005	Sophie Scholl – The Final Days	Sophie Scholl – Die letzten Tage	Marc Rothemund	Germany
2006	Grbavica		Jasmila Žbanić	Bosnia and Herzegovina
2007	Tuya's Marriage	图雅的婚事	Wang Quan'an	China
2008	I've Loved You So Long	Il y a longtemps que je t'aime	Philippe Claudel	France
2009	Little Soldier	Lille soldat	Annette K. Olesen	Denmark
2010	Honey	Bal	Semih Kaplanoğlu	Turkey
2011	A Separation	جدایی نادر از سیمین	Asghar Farhadi	Iran
2012	Caesar Must Die	Cesare deve morire	Paolo and Vittorio Taviani	Italy
2013	Gloria		Sebastián Lelio	Chile
2014	Stations of the Cross	Kreuzweg	Dietrich Brüggemann	Germany
2015	The Pearl Button	El botón de nácar	Patricio Guzmán	Chile
2016	Fire at Sea	Fuocoammare	Gianfranco Rosi	Italy
2017	On Body and Soul	Testről és lélekről	Ildikó Enyedi	Hungary
2018	In the Aisles	In den Gängen	Thomas Stuber	Germany
2019	God Exists, Her Name Is Petrunya	Господ постои, името ѝ е Петрунија	Teona Strugar Mitevska	Macedonia
2020	There Is No Evil	شیطان وجود ندارد	Mohammad Rasoulof	Iran
2022	One Year, One Night	Un año, una noche	Isaki Lacuesta	Spain
2023	Tótem		Lila Avilés	Mexico
2024	My Favourite Cake	کیک محبوب من	Maryam Moghaddam and Behtash Sanaeeha	Iran
2025	The Blue Trail (International Competition); The Heart is a Muscle (Panorama Section); Holding Liat (Forum Section)	O Último Azul; The Heart is a Muscle; Holding Liat	Gabriel Mascaro; Imran Hamdulay; Brandon Kramer	Brazil, Mexico, Chile, Netherlands; South Africa; United States

=== Montreal Film Festival (1979–2019) ===
Year	English Title	Original title	Director(s)	Production Country
1979	Night-Flowers		Louis San Andres	United States
1980	Sunday Daughters	Vasárnapi szülök	János Rózsa	Hungary
1981	Sally and Freedom	Sally och friheten	Gunnel Lindblom	Sweden
1982	Begin the Beguine	Volver a Empezar	José Luis Garci	Spain
1983	The Go Masters	未完の対局	Ji-shun Duan, Junya Sato	Japan
1984	Annie's Coming Out		Gil Brealey	Australia
1985	Power of Evil	Le pouvoir du mal	Krzysztof Zanussi	France
1986	My Sweet Little Village	Vesničko má středisková	Jiří Menzel	Czechoslovakia
1987	Farewell Moscow	Mosca addio	Mauro Bolognini	Italy
1988	Salaam Bombay!		Mira Nair	India
1989	Last Images of the Shipwreck	Últimas imágenes del naufragio	Eliseo Subiela	Argentina, Spain
1989	My Left Foot: The Story of Christy Brown		Jim Sheridan	Ireland
1990	Landscape with a Woman	Žena s krajolikom	Ivica Matić	Yugoslavia
1991	War and Youth	戦争と青春	Tadashi Imai	Japan
1992	Sofie		Henri Nathansen	Denmark
1993	The Long Silence	Il lungo silenzio	Margarethe von Trotta	Italy
1994	Once Were Warriors		Alan Duff	New Zealand
1995	Deep River	深い河	Kei Kumai	Japan
1996	Hamsun		Jan Troell	Norway, Denmark, Sweden
1997	Children of Heaven	بچه‌های آسمان	Majid Majidi	Iran
1998	The Lighthouse	El faro	Eduardo Mignogna	Argentina, Spain
1999	Goya in Bordeaux	Goya en Burdeos	Carlos Saura	Spain
2000	Ali Zaoua: Prince of the Streets	علي زاوا	Nabil Ayouch	Morocco
2001	Abandoned	Torzók	Arpád Sopsits	Hungary
2002	The Last Train	El último tren: Corazón de fuego	Diego Arsuaga	Uruguay, Argentina
2003	Gaz Bar Blues		Louis Bélanger	Canada
2004	The Syrian Bride	הכלה הסורית	Eran Riklis	Israel
2005	Kamataki		Claude Gagnon	Canada, Japan
2006	A Long Walk	長い散歩	Eiji Okuda	Japan
2007	Ben X		Nic Balthazar	Belgium, Netherlands
2008	Wolf	Varg	Daniel Alfredson	Sweden
2009	Ceasefire	Waffenstillstand	Lancelot von Naso	Germany
2010	Oxygen	Adem	Hans Van Nuffel	Belgium
2011	David		Joel Fendelman	United States
2012	End of the No-Hunting Season	Ende der Schonzeit	Franziska Schlotterer	Germany
2013	Life Feels Good	Chce się żyć	Maciej Pieprzyca	Poland
2014	Cape Nostalgia	ふしぎな岬の物語	Izuru Narushima	Japan
2015	The Midnight Orchestra	L'orchestre de minuit	Jérôme Cohen Olivar	Morocco

=== Locarno Film Festival (1973–present) ===
Year	English Title	Original title	Director(s)	Production Country
1973	The Illumination	Iluminacja	Krzysztof Zanussi	Poland
1974	25 Fireman's Street	Tüzolto Utca 25	István Szabó	Hungary
1974	27 Down		Awtar Krishna Kaul	India
1975	Noua	نوة	Abdelaziz Tolbi	Algeria
1976	Harvest: 3,000 Years	ምርት "፫ሺህ ዓመት"	Haile Gerima	Ethiopia
1977	The Guest: An episode in the Life of Eugène Marais		Ross Devenish	South Africa
1978	Baara		Souleymane Cissé	Mali
1979	Les petites fugues		Yves Yersin	Switzerland
1980	In for Treatment	Opname	Marja Kok, Erik van Zuylen	Netherlands
1981	Chakra	चक्र	Rabindra Dharmaraj	India
1982	Parti sans laisser d'adresse		Jacqueline Veuve	France
1983	The Planet 'Tailor'	Planeta krawiec	Jerzy Domaradzki	Poland
1984	The Terence Davies Trilogy		Terence Davies	United Kingdom
1984	Tiznao		Salvador Bonet, Dominique Cassuto de Bonet	Venezuela
1985	Alpine Fire	Höhenfeuer	Fredi M. Murer	Switzerland
1986	Lamb		Colin Gregg	United Kingdom
1987	With Love to the Person Next to Me		Brian McKenzie	Australia
1988	Family Viewing		Atom Egoyan	Canada
1989	Why Has Bodhi-Dharma Left for the East?	달마가 동쪽으로 간 까닭은?	Bae Yong-kyun	South Korea
1990	Hush-a-Bye Baby		Margo Harkin	United Kingdom
1991	Cloud-Paradise	Облако-рай	Nikolai Dostal	Soviet Union
1992	Family Portrait	四十不惑	Li Shaohong	China
1993	Bhaji on the Beach	भाजी ऑन द बीच	Gurinder Chadha	United Kingdom
1994	Ermo	二嫫	Zhou Xiaowen	China
1995	Sept en attente		Françoise Etchegaray	France
1996	Honey and Ashes	Miel et cendres	Nadia Farès	Switzerland, Tunisia
1997	The Crazy Stranger	Gadjo dilo	Tony Gatlif	France
1998	Titanic Town		Roger Michell	United Kingdom
1999	Life Doesn't Scare Me	La vie ne me fait pas peur	Noémie Lvovsky	France
2000	Father	爸爸	Wang Shuo	China
2001	L'Afrance		Alain Gomis	France, Senegal
2001	Promises (special prize)		Carlos Bolado, B.Z. Goldberg, Justine Shapiro	United States
2002	The Cage	La cage	Alain Raoust	France
2003	Silent Waters	خاموش پانی	Sabiha Sumar	Pakistan
2004	Yasmin		Kenneth Glenaan	Germany, United Kingdom
2005	The Novena	La Neuvaine	Bernard Émond	Canada
2006	Water	Agua	Verónica Chen	Argentina, France
2007	The Yellow House	La maison jaune	Amor Hakkar	Algeria, France
2008	Black Sea	Mar nero	Federico Bondi	Italy
2009	Plato's Academy	Ακαδημία Πλάτωνος	Filippos Tsitos	Greece
2010	Morgen		Marian Crișan	Romania
2011	Special Flight	Vol spécial	Fernand Melgar	Switzerland
2012	A Lady in Paris	Une Estonienne à Paris	Ilmar Raag	France, Belgium, Estonia
2013	Short Term 12		Destin Daniel Cretton	United States
2014	The Fool	Дурак	Yuri Bykov	Russia
2015	Paradise	ما، در بهشت	Sina Ataeian Dena	Iran
2016	Godless	Безбог	Ralitza Petrova	Bulgaria
2017	Lucky		John Carroll Lynch	United States
2018	Sibel		Çagla Zencirci, Guillaume Giovanetti	Turkey
2019	Maternal	Hogar	Maura Delpero	Argentina
2021	Soul of a Beast		Lorenz Merz	Switzerland
2022	Tales of the Purple House	حكايات البيت الأرجواني	Abbas Fahdel	Lebanon, Iraq, France
2025	Solomamma		Janicke Askevold	Norway, Latvia, Lithuania, Denmark, Finland

=== Karlovy Vary International Film Festival (1994–present) ===
Year	English	Original title	Director(s)	Production Country
1994	Palms	Ладони	Artour Aristakisian	Russia
1995	The Garden	Záhrada	Martin Sulík	Slovakia, France
1996	Prisoner of the Mountains	Кавказский пленник	Sergei Bodrov	Russia, Kazakhstan
1997	Forgotten Light	Zapomenuté světlo	Vladimír Michálek	Czech Republic
1998	The Harmonists	Comedian Harmonists	Joseph Vilsmaier	Germany
1999	A Reasonable Man		Gavin Hood	South Africa
2000	Big Animal	Duże zwierzę	Jerzy Stuhr	Poland
2001	Chico		Eduardo Rózsa Flores	Hungary
2002	Cisza		Michał Rosa	Poland
2003	Babusya	Бабуся	Lidia Bobrova	Russia
2004	Cavedweller		Lisa Cholodenko	United States
2005	Chinaman	中国先生	Henrik Ruben Genz	Denmark, China
2006	Destiny	El destino	Miguel Pereira	Argentina
2007	Simple Things	Простые вещи	Aleksey Popogrebskiy	Russia
2008	The Photograph		Nan Achnas	Indonesia
2009	Twenty	بیست	Abdolreza Kahani	Iran
2010	Another Sky	Другое небо	Dmitry Mamuliya	Russia
2011	Cracks in the Shell	Die Unsichtbare	Christian Schwochow	Germany
2012	Camion		Rafaël Ouellet	Canada
2013	Bluebird		Lance Edmands	United States
2014	Corn Island	სიმინდის კუნძული	Giorgi Ovashvili	Georgia
2015	Bob and the Trees		Diego Ongaro	United States
2016	The Confessions	Le confessioni	Roberto Andò	Italy
2017	The Cakemaker	האופה מברלין	Ofir Raul Graizer	Israel, Germany
2018	Redemption	גאולה	Joseph Madmony, Boaz Jonathan Yacov	Israel
2019	Lara		Jan-Ole Gerster	Germany
2021	As Far as I Can Walk	Strahinja Banović	Stefan Arsenijević	Serbia, France, Luxembourg, Bulgaria, Lithuania
2022	A Provincial Hospital	Една провинциална болница	Ilian Metev, Ivan Chertov, Zlatina Teneva	Bulgaria, Germany
2025	Rebuilding		Max Walker-Silverman	United States
2026	The Lion at My Back	Za zády mi číhá lev	Tonia Mishiali	Cyprus, Luxembourg, Greece
