= 26th Locarno Film Festival =

Film festival in Locarno, Switzerland

- Location: Locarno, Switzerland
- Founded: 1946
- Awards: Golden Leopard: The Illumination directed by Krzysztof Zanussi
- Artistic director: Moritz de Hadeln
- Festival date: Opening: 2 August 1973; Closing: 12 August 1973
- Website: Locarno Film Festival

Locarno Film Festival
- 27th 25th

The 26th Locarno Film Festival was held from 2 to 12 August 1973 in Locarno, Switzerland. Moritz de Hadeln's tenure as festival director was noted for shifting the festival away from its reputation as a festival for "young cinema" and students. The top three prizes were noted for all involving the stories of young men coming of age.

The festival awarded its top prize, the Golden Leopard, to The Illumination directed by Krzysztof Zanussi. The second prize went to Voyage with Jacob directed by Pal Gabor and the third prize, the Bronze Leopard, went to American Graffiti directed by George Lucas, which was the only American film awarded at the festival this year.

== Jury ==
The jury was presided over by German film critic Ulrich Gregor, British director Thorold Dickinson, Hungarian filmmaker Istvan Szabo, Syrian director Nabil Maleh and Swiss filmmaker Daniel Schmid.

== Official Sections ==
The following films were screened in these sections:

=== Main Program ===
Main Program / Feature Films In Competition

Original Title	English Title	Director(s)	Year	Production Country
Abusuan	The Family	Henry Duparc	1972	Ivory Coast
American Graffiti		George Lucas	1973	USA
Brannen	Fire	Haakon Sandoy	1973	Norway
England Made Me		Peter Duffell	1973	Great Britain
Flugten	The Escape	Hans Kristensen	1973	Denmark
Harlis	The Sensuous Three	Robert Van Ackeren	1972	Germany
Iluminacja	The Illumination	Krzysztof Zanussi	1973	Poland
Injun Fender		Robert Cordier	1973	USA
Je Cherche Les Miens	I'm Looking for Mine	Mikhail Boguine		Russia
Johnny Vik	The Hunted	Charles Nauman	1973	USA
KLK an PTX – Die Rote Kapelle	KLK Calling PTZ – The Red Orchestra	Horst E. Brandt	1971	Germany
La Mansion De La Locura	The Mansion of Madness	Juan Lopez Moctezuma	1973	Mexico
Le Cousin Jules	The Cousin Jules	Dominique Benicheti	1972	France
Le Train Rouge	The Red Train	Petra Amann	1972	Switzerland
Les Vilaines Manieres	The Nasty Manners	Simon Edelstein	1973	Switzerland
Maya Darpan		Kumar Shahani	1972	India
Storie Scellerate	Bawdy Tales	Sergio Citti	1973	Italia
Stregone Di Cittâ	Witch of Cittâ	Gianfranco Bettetini	1973	Italia
Thermoc		Claude Faraldo		France
Tschetan, Der Indianerjunge	Chetan, the Indian Boy	Hark Bohm	1973	Germany
Utazas Jakabbal	Voyage with Jacob	Pal Gabor	1972	Hungary

=== Out of Competition ===
Main Program / Feature Films Out of Competition

Original Title	English Title	Director(s)	Year	Production Country
Baltutlaemningen		Johan Bergenstähle	1970	Sudan
L'Invitation		Claude Goretta	1973	Switzerland
Sleuth		Joseph L. Mankiewicz	1972	USA
Tristan Et Iseult	Tristan and Iseult	Yvan Lagrande	1972	France

Main Program / Short Films Out of Competition (Award -Winning Films)

Original Title	English Title	Director(s)	Year	Production Country
Cinema		Sebastian C. Schroeder	1972	Switzerland
Dan Vise	And Vise	Vlatko Gilic	1972	Yugoslavia
Für Ausländische Und Deutsche Arbeiter	For Foreign and German Workers	Kurt Rosenthal, Christine Trautmann	1973	Germany
In Continuo	Continuously	Vlatko Gilic	1972	Yugoslavia
Juda	Quite	Vlatko Gilic	1972	Yugoslavia
Mitläufer	Fellow Runner	Noscha Christian, Vlada Majic	1972	Germany
Sobre Un Primer Combate	About a First Fight	Octavio Cortazar	1972	Cuba

=== Special Sections ===
Open Forum
Al-Makhdu Un		Tewfik Saleh	1972	Syria
Alfred R		Georg Radanowicz		Switzerland
Berliner Bettwurst	Berlin Bedwurst	Rosa von Praunheim (coordonné par)	1973	Germany
Das War Der Wilde Westen	That Was the Wild West	George Dufaux		Switzerland
Der Scharlochrote Buchstabe	The Scarlet Letter	Wim Wenders	1973	Germany
Die Bitteren Tränen Der Petra Von Kant	The Bitter Tears of Petra von Kant	Rainer Werner Fassbinder	1972	Germany
Heat		Paul Morissey	1972	USA
Hollywood		Paul Morissey		USA
Les Anges	The Angels	Jean Desvilles	1973	France
Mecanica Nacional	National Mechanics	Luis Alcoriza	1972	Mexico
Soplo De Splendor	Splendor Breath	Carlos Benito Para		Spain
Willow Springs		Werner Schroeter	1973	Germany
Wrom	Wred	George Dufaux		Switzerland
Year Of A Woman		Sandra Hochman	1973	USA
Tribute To Hans Richter
Dreams That Money Can Buy		Hans Richter		USA
Forty Years Of Experiment		Hans Richter	1961	USA

==== Film Critics Week ====
FIPRESCI - International Federation of Film Critics Week
Original Title	English Title	Director(s)	Year	Production Country
Camera Sutra	The Sutra Room	Robbe de Hert	1972	Belgium
Die Wollands	The Wollands	Ingo Kratisch, Marianne Lüdcke		Germany
Ras Le Bol	Fed Up	Michel Huisman	1972	France
Romantika	Romance	Zsolt Kézdi-Kovacs	1973	Hungary
Viggen - Ett Militaerplan Historie	Viggen - a Militaer Plan History	Maj Wechselmann		Sudan

=== Swiss Cinema ===
==== Swiss Information ====
Swiss Information
Der Tod Des Flohzirkusdiretores Oder Ottocaro Weiss Reformiert Seine Firma	The Death of the Flea Circus Director or Ottocaro Weiss Reforms His Company	Thomas Koerfer	1973	Switzerland
Le Retour D'Afrique	The Return of Africa	Alain Tanner	1972	Switzerland
Lo Stagionale	The Seasonal	Alvaro Bizzarri	1973	Switzerland
Naive Maler In Der Ostschweiz	Naive Painters in Eastern Switzerland	Richard Dindo	1972	Switzerland

==== Swiss Cinema Retrospective 1920-1944 ====
Swiss Cinema Retrospective 1920-1944
Chromophony		Charles Blanc-Gatti	1939	Switzerland
Cine-Journal Suisse	Swiss Cine-Journal			Switzerland
Die Entstehung Der Eidgenossenschaft	The Formation of the Confederation	Emil Harder	1924	Switzerland
Die Letzte Chance	The Last Chance	Léopold Lindtberg	1945	Switzerland
Fusilier Wipf	WIPF Rifge	Léopold Lindtberg	1938	Switzerland
Histoire De Monsieur Vieux-Bois	History of Monsieur Vieux-Bois	Lortac, Cavé	1922	Switzerland
Il Neige Sur Le Haut-Pays	It Snows on the Upper	Charles-Georges Duvanel	1944	Switzerland
Kirmes In Hooywood		Julius Pinschewer	1929	Switzerland
L'Annee Vigneronne	The Wine	Charles-Georges Duvanel	1940	Switzerland
L'Or Dans La Montagne	Gold in the Mountains	Max Haufler	1939	Switzerland
La Vocation D'Andre Carel		Jean Choux	1925	Switzerland
Les Ailes En Susse	Wings in Switzerland	Charles-Georges Duvanel	1929	Switzerland
Manouche	Gypsy	Fred Surville	1943	Switzerland
Meunier Tu Dors	Meunier you Sleep	Jean Varé	1930	France
Märchen Vom Orient	Fairy Tale of the Orient	Julius Pinschewer	1930	Switzerland
Rapt		Dimitri Kirsanoff	1934	Switzerland
Romeo Und Julia Auf Der Dorfe	Romeo and Julia on the Village	Valerian Schmidely, Hans Trommer	1941	Switzerland
Schweizersymphonie	Swiss Symphony	Julius Pinschewer	1939	Switzerland
Une Oeuvre, Un Peuple	A Work, a People	Robert Chessex, Charles-Georges Duvanel	1940	Switzerland
Waarken	Were Waiting	Julius Pinschewer	1929	Switzerland

== Official Awards ==
=== International Jury ===
- Golden Leopard: THE ILLUMINATION by Krzysztof Zanussi
- Silver Leopard: VOYAGE WITH JACOB by Pal Gabor
- Bronze Leopard: AMERICAN GRAFFITI by George Lucas
- International Jury special Prize: LE COUSIN JULES by Dominique Benicheti
- International Jury Mention: JE CHERCHE LES MIENS by Mikhail Boguine, INJUN FENDER by Robert Cordier, MAYA DARPAN by Kumar Shahani, STREGONE IN CITTÀ by Gianfranco Bettetini, TSCHETA, DER INDIANERJUNGE by Hark Bohm

=== FIPRESCI Jury ===
- Vinicio Beretta (1922-1972) Prize: THE ILLUMINATION by Krzysztof Zanussi

=== Youth Jury ===
- Youth Jury Prize: NAÏVE MALER IN DER OSTSCHWEIZ by Dindo Richard, LE TRAIN ROUGE by Petra Amann, ROMANTIKA by Zsolt Kézdi-Kovacs, DAN VISE by Vlatko Gilic, JUDA by Vlatko Gilic, LE COUSIN JULES by Dominique Benicheti, IN CONTINUO by Vlatko Gilic

=== Oecumenical Jury ===
- Oecumenical Jury Prize: THE ILLUMINATION by Krzysztof Zanussi
- Oecumenical Jury special Mention: LE COUSIN JULES by Dominique Benicheti
