= 32nd Locarno Film Festival =

Film festival in Locarno, Switzerland

- Location: Locarno, Switzerland
- Founded: 1946
- Awards: Golden Leopard: The Herd directed by Zeki Okten
- Artistic director: Jean-Pierre Brossard
- Festival date: Opening: 2 August 1979; Closing: 12 August 1979
- Website: LFF

Locarno Film Festival
- 33rd 31st

The 32nd Locarno Film Festival was held from 2 to 12 August 1979 in Locarno, Switzerland. Eighteen films competed at the festival from thirteen nations. Some interesting films at the festival were the Cannes Film Festival Un Certain Regard competitor Les Petites Fugues directed by Yves Yersin and the symbolic insane asylum picture Hospital of the Transfiguration directed by Edward Zebrowski.

On the last night of the festival, jury member and actress Bianca Jagger made an impromptu appeal for nations around the world to support her home country of Nicaragua through international aid.

The Golden Leopard, the festival's top prize, was awarded to The Herd directed by Zeki Okten. Incarcerated screenwriter of The Herd, Yilmaz Güney, received a Special mention by the International Jury.

== International Jury ==
- Bianca Jagger, Nicaraguan actress and human rights advocate
- Pascale Dauman, French distributor
- Carlo Di Palma, Italian cinematographer
- Pal Gabor, Hungarian film director
- Bruno Ganz, Swiss actor
- Daniel Olbrychski, Polish actor
- Nicos Panayotopoulos, Greek critic and screenwriter

== Official Sections ==
The following films were screened in these sections:

=== Main Program ===
==== Feature Films In Competition ====
English Title	Original Title	Director(s)	Year	Production Country
The Stud Farm	A Menesgazda	Andras Kovacs	1978	Hungary
On the Move	Die Abfahrer	Adolf Winkelmann	1978	Germany
Distance	Dooratwa	Buddhadeb Dasgupta	1978	India
Elvis		John Carpenter	1979	USA
Felicite		Christine Pascal	1979	France
The Poignant Years	Gli Anni Struggenti	Vittorio Sindoni		Italia
Zones	Grauzone	Fredi M. Murer	1979	Switzerland
Immacolata and Concetta: The Other Jealousy	Immacolata E Concetta	Salvatore Piscitelli	1980	Italia
Breakdown	Kvar	Miloš "Misa" Radivojević	1979	Yugoslavia
The Divorcee	Le Divorcement	Pierre Barouh	1979	France
Les Petites Fugues		Yves Yersin	1979	Switzerland
Last Love	Letzte Liebe	Ingemo Engstöm	1979	Germany
Blood of the Railroad Workers	Rallarblod	Erik Solbakken	1979	Norway
Staromodnaya komediya		Tatyana Berezantseva, Elena Savelieva	1978	Russia
Hospital of the Transfiguration	Szpital Przemienieniea	Edward Zebrowski	1978	Poland
The Herd	Sürü	Zeki Okten	1978	Türkiye
The Kirlian Witness	The Plants Are Watching	Jonathan Sarno	1979	USA
The Newcomer	Le Nouveau Venu	Richard de Medeiros	1976	Benin*

==== Out of Competition ====
Main Program / Feature Films Out of Competition
English Title	Original Title	Director(s)	Production Country
Miss from the Wolf	Panny Z Wilka	Andrzej Wajda	Poland
Wise Blood		John Huston	USA

=== Special Sections ===
==== Open Forum ====
Free Forum
Original title	English title	Director(s)	Year	Production country
Albert, Warum?	Albert, Why?	Josef Rödl	1978	Germany
Angi Vera		Pal Gabor	1978	Hungary
Armee Der Liebenden	Army of Lovers or Revolt of the Perverts	Rosa von Praunheim (coordonné par)	1979	Germany
Assault On Precinct 13		John Carpenter	1976	USA
Bourbon Street Blues		Douglas Sirk		Germany
Dalla Nube Alla Resistenza	From the Clouds to the Resistance	Danielle Huillet, Jean-Marie Straub	1979	Italia, Germany
Der Eintänzer	The Single Dancer	Rebecca Horn	1978	Germany
Geschichte Der Nacht	History of the Night	Clemens Klopfenstein	1979	Switzerland
Honeymoon		George Panoussopoulos	1979	Greece
Kalte Heimat	Cold Home	W. Werner Schaeffer	1979	Germany
Le Destin Personnel	Personal Fate	Paul Seban	1979	France
Neskolko Interwju Po Litschny Woprosam	Several Interviews on Personal Issues	Lana Gogoberidze		Russia

==== Retrospective - Yasujiro Ozu ====
Retrospective Yasujiro Ozu (1903-1963)
English title	Original title	Director(s)	Year	Production country
Late Autumn	Akibiyori, 秋日和	Yasujiro Ozu	1960	Japan
Late Spring	Banshun, 晩春	Yasujiro Ozu	1949	Japan
There Was a Father	Chichi Ariki, 父ありき	Yasujiro Ozu	1942	Japan
Passing Fancy	Dekigokoro, 出来ごころ	Yasujiro Ozu	1933	Japan
Equinox Flower	Higanbana, 彼岸花	Yasujiro Ozu	1958	Japan
The Only Son	Hitori Musuko, 一人息子,	Yasujiro Ozu	1936	Japan
The End of Summer	Kohayagawa Ke No Aki, 小早川家の秋	Yasujiro Ozu	1961	Japan
The Flavor of Green Tea over Rice	Ochasuke No Aji, お茶漬の味	Yasujiro Ozu	1952	Japan
An Autumn Afternoon	Samma No Aji, 秋刀魚の味	Yasujiro Ozu	1962	Japan
Tokyo Story	Tokyo Monogatari, 東京物語	Yasujiro Ozu	1953	Japan
Tokyo Chorus	Tokyo no kōrasu, 東京の合唱	Yasujiro Ozu	1931	Japan
I Was Born, But...	大人の見る絵本 生れてはみたけれど	Yasujiro Ozu	1932	Japan

==== Swiss Information ====
Swiss Information - Feature Films
Original title	English title	Director(s)	Year	Production country
Behinderte Liebe	Disabled Love	Marlies Graf		Switzerland
Die Schweizermacher	The Swiss Makers	Rolf Lyssy		Switzerland
Kleine Freiheit	Little Freedom	Hans Schlumpf		Switzerland
Messidor		Alain Tanner		Switzerland
Swiss Information - Short Films
Flash		Robi Engler		Switzerland
L'Eroe	The Hero	Armando Boneff - GC, Javier Martinez		Switzerland
Mais Qu'Est-Ce Qui Peut Bien M'Angoisser Comme Ça?	But What can Worry Me Like That?	Martial Wannoz		Switzerland
Ralf Die Ratte: Golf	Ralf the Gears: Wave	Gilbert Mayer		Switzerland

== Parallel Sections ==
=== Film Critics Week ===
FIPRESCI - International Federation of Film Critics Week
Original Title	English Title	Director(s)	Year	Production Country
Fagyöngyök	Mistletoe	Judit Ember		Hungary
Kuznetchik	Kunnetchik	Boris Grigoriev		Russia
Matriarcat	Matriarchy	Liudmil Kirkov		Bulgaria
My Way Home		Bill Douglas		Great Britain
Plomenie	Plking	Ryszard Czekala		Poland
Rove Khouliot		Ilan Moshenson		Israel
Schilten	Scary	Beat Kuert		Switzerland

== Official Awards ==
=== International Jury ===
- Golden Leopard: The Herd directed by Zeki Okten
- Ernest Artaria Prize: The Stud Farm directed by Andras Kovacs
- International Jury Special Prize: Immacolata and Concetta: The Other Jealousy directed by Salvatore Piscitelli
- International Jury Grand Prize: LES PETITES FUGUES to actor Michel Robin
- International Jury’s first Special mention: Production team for Hospital of the Transfiguration by Edward Zebrowski
- International Jury’s second Special mention: Screenplay of The Herd written by Yilmaz Güney

=== FIPRESCI Jury ===
- International Critics Award: LETZTE LIEBE by Ingemo Engstöm, The Stud Farm directed by Andras Kovacs

=== Women’s Jury ===
- Golden Apple: THE HERD directed by Zeki Okten, DER EINTÄNZER by Rebecca Horn

=== Oecumenical Jury ===
- Oecumenical Jury Prize: LES PETITES FUGUES by Yves Yersin
