= 31st Locarno Film Festival =

Film festival in Locarno, Switzerland

- Location: Locarno, Switzerland
- Founded: 1946
- Awards: Golden Leopard: The Idlers of the Fertile Valley directed by Nikos Panayotopoulos
- Artistic director: Jean-Pierre Brossard
- No. of films: 108
- Festival date: Opening: 3 August 1978; Closing: 13 August 1978
- Website: Locarno Film Festival

Locarno Film Festival
- 32nd 30th

The 31st Locarno Film Festival was held from 3 to 13 August 1978 in Locarno, Switzerland. The festival featured 22 films in competition from 18 countries, while 86 films were screened out of competition. American films were well represented at the festival this year with John Cassavetes' Opening Night featuring and the Bronze Leopard, the festival's third prize, being awarded to Girlfriends directed by Claudia Weill.

A key element this year was the retrospective for famed director and Locarno local Douglas Sirk, who had often attended the festival in the past. This was also the year Jean-Pierre Brossard became the new festival head, following the departure of artistic director Moritz de Hadeln.

The Golden Leopard, the festival's top prize, was awarded to The Idlers of the Fertile Valley directed by Nikos Panayotopoulos.

== Jury ==
- Valerio Zurlini, Italian director
- Marcel Carriere, Canadian director and producer
- Roger Jendly, Swiss actor
- Patricia Moraz, Swiss director
- Marta Meszaros, Hungarian director and writer
- Marie-Jose Nat, French actress
- Jean-Pierre Dikongue Pipa, Cameroonian director and writer

== Official Sections ==
The following films were screened in these sections:

=== Main Program ===
Main Program / Feature Films In Competition

Original Title	English Title	Director(s)	Production Country
Baara	Work	Souleymane Cissé	Mali
Bako, L'Autre Rive	Bako, the Other Bank	Jacques Champreux	Senegal, France
Burlesk Queen	Burlesque Queen	Celso Ad. Castillo	Philippines
Buyut Fi Dhalika Al-Zuqaq	Bouthuut Fi Dhalika Al-Zuq	Kassem Hawel	Iraq
Cseplo Gyuri		Pal Schiffer	Hungary
Das Zweite Erwachen Der Christa Klages	The Second Awakening of Christa Klages	Margarethe Von Trotta	Germany
Diamante Bruto	Rough Diamond	Orlando Senna	Brazil
Fingers		James Toback	USA
Girlfriends		Claudia Weill	USA
Hoshizora No Marionette	The Starry Sky's Marrione	Hojin Hashiura	Japan
I Tembelides Tis Eforis Kiladas	The Idlers of the Fertile Valley	Nikos Panayotopoulos	Greece
Kleine Frieren Auch Im Sommer	Small Freezes in Summer	Peter von Gunten	Switzerland
La Morte Al Lavoro	Death at Work	Gianni Amelio	Italia
La Petite Ville D'Anara	The Small Town of Anara	Irakly Kvirikadzé	Russia
La Tortue Sur Le Dos	The Turtle on the Back	Luc Béraud	France
Le Toit	The Roof	Ivan Antonov	Bulgaria
Miris Poljskog Cveca	The Fragrance of the Polish Flowers	Srdjan Karanovic	Yugoslavia
Non Contate Su Di Noi	Don't Count on Us	Sergio Nuti	Italia
On Efface Tout	We Erase Everything	Pascal Vidal	France
Pokoj Z Widokiem Na Morze	Room with a Sea View	Janusz Zaorski	Poland
Two Solitudes		Lionel Chetwind	Canada
Una Mujer, Un Hombre, Una Ciudad	A Woman, a Man, a City	Manuel Octavio Gomez	Cuba

=== Special Sections ===
==== Open Forum ====
Open Forum
Original Title	English Title	Director(s)	Year	Production Country
China 9, Liberty 37		Monte Hellman		Italy
Die Allseitig Reduzierte Persönlichkeit-Redupers	The all-Sided Reduced Personality Redupers	Helke Sanders		Germany
Fluchtweg Nach Marseille	Escape Path to Marseille	Ingemo Engstöm, Gerhard Theuring		Germany
Harlan County		Barbara Kopple		United States
Il Regno Di Napoli	The Kingdom of Naples	Werner Schroeter		Germany
L'Albero Degli Zoccoli	The Clog Tree	Ermanno Olmi		Italy
Lulu		Roland Chase		United States
Olyan, Mint Otthon	It's Like at Home	Marta Meszaros		Hungary
Opening Night		John Cassavetes		United States
Roberte	Robert	Pierre Zucca		France
The Gardener'S Son		Richard Pearce		United States
Word Is Out		Marisposa Film Group		United States

==== Information ====
Information Screenings
Original Title	English Title	Director(s)	Year	Production Country
Angel City		Jon Jost		United States
Docteur Poenaru		Dinu Tanase		Romania
Kanchana Sita		Govindan Arivindan		India
La Rabia	The Rage	Eugeni Anglada		Spain
La Vie T'En As Qu'Une	Life you Have One	Jean-Pierre Etard, Abraham Ségal		France
Last Chant		Jon Jost		United States
Le Prix De La Liberte	The Price of Freedom	Jean-Pierre Dikongué-Pipa		Cameroon
Le Saut Du Toit	The Roof Jump	Vladimir Grigoriev		Russia
Madame X - Eine Absolute Herrscherin	Madame X - An Absolute Ruler	Ulrike Ottinger		Germany

==== Young Authors On Italian Television (1977-1978) ====
Young Authors On Italian Television (1977-1978) RAI Network
Original Title	English Title	Director(s)	Year	Production Country
Ancora Un Giorno	One more Day	Mimmo Rafele		Italy
Aspetterò	I will Wait	Mario Foglietti		Italy
Cantar Di Tempi Oscuri	Sing of Dark Times	Nino Bizzarri		Italy
Figlioli Miei Marxisti Immaginari	My Children's Imaginary Marxists	Franco Albano		Italy
Il Grande Bob	He Big Bob	Nanni Fabbri		Italy
La Macchina Cinema	The Cinema Machine	Silvano Agosti, Marco Bellocchio		Italy
Marcello		Salvatore Piscicelli		Italy
Metallurgic Disco		Nereo Rapetti		Italy
Michele Alla Ricerca Della Felicità	Michele in Search of Happiness	Alberto Grifi		Italy
Morte Di Un Operatore	Death of an Operator	Faliero Rosati		Italy
Nell'Agro Pontino	In the Pontine Countryside	Nicolò Ferrari		Italy
Quasi Un Uomo	Almost a Man	Oddo Bracci		Italy
Storia Senza Parole	Story without Words	Biagio Proietti		Italy
Vent'Anni Di Tre Generazioni: L'Amore	Twenty Years of Three Generations: Love	Giuseppe Bellecca		Italy

=== Retrospective - Douglas Sirk ===
Retrospective Douglas Sirk
Original Title	English Title	Director(s)	Year	Production Country
Accord Final		Douglas Sirk, Ignacy Rosenkranz Bay	1939	France, Switzerland
All I Desire		Douglas Sirk	1953	USA
All That Heaven Allows		Douglas Sirk	1955	USA
Das Hofkonzert	The Court Concert	Douglas Sirk	1936	Germany
Das Mädchen Von Moorhof	The Girl from Moorhof	Douglas Sirk	1935	Germany
Hitler'S Madman		Douglas Sirk	1942	USA
Imitation Of Life		Douglas Sirk	1958	USA
Lured/Personal Column		Douglas Sirk	1946	USA
No Room For The Groom		Douglas Sirk	1952	USA
Schlussakkord	Final Chord	Douglas Sirk	1936	Germany
Sprich Zu Mir Wie Der Regen	Speak to Me Like the Rain	Douglas Sirk	1975	Germany
Summer Storm		Douglas Sirk	1944	USA
Sylvesternacht	Sylvestern Night	Douglas Sirk	1977	Germany
The Tarnished Angels		Douglas Sirk	1957	USA
Written In The Wind		Douglas Sirk	1956	USA

=== Film Critics Week ===
FIPRESCI - International Federation of Film Critics Week
Original Title	English Title	Director(s)	Year	Production Country
A Scandal In Paris		Douglas Sirk	1945	USA
Entends Le Coq	Hear the Rooster	Stéphane Dimitrov		Bulgaria
Filmroman	Movie Novel	Istva Darday, Yörgyi Szalai		Hungary
In Alle Stilte	In all of Them	Ralf Boumans		Belgium
La Lutte Des Aveugles	The Struggle of the Blind	Marie Hadzimichalis-Papalios		Greece
La Mort Du Grand-Père Ou Le Sommeil Du Juste	The Death of the Grandfather or the Sleep of the Just	Jacqueline Veuve		Switzerland
Ruzove Sny	Ruzova Dreams	Dusan Hanak		Czech Republic
Sous-Ets	Sub-Statements	Yaky Yosha		Israel

=== Swiss Information ===
Swiss Information - Feature Films
Original Title	English Title	Director(s)	Year	Production Country
Alzir Oder Der Neue Kontinent	Alzir or the New Continent	Thomas Koerfer		Switzerland
Chronik Von Prugiasco	Chronicle of Prugiasco	Remo Legnazzi		Switzerland
Das Blut An Den Lippen Des Liebenden	The Blood on the Lovers' Lips	Christian Schocher		Switzerland
Le Desert Des Mediocres	The Desert of Mediocres	Hank Vogel		Switzerland
Reperages	Reperes	Michel Soutter		Switzerland
Stillleben	Still Life	Elisabeth Gujer		Switzerland
Südseereise	South Seed	Sebastian C. Schroeder		Switzerland
Tauwetter		Markus Imhoof		Switzerland
Swiss Information - Medium-Length Films
Eiskalte Vögel	Ice Cold Birds	Urs Egger		Switzerland
Horizonville		Alain Klarer		Switzerland
Hotel Locarno	Locarno Hotel	Bernard Weber		Switzerland
Mir Si Ir Glicheschtrass Ufgwachse	I Like the	Remo Legnazzi		Switzerland
Palm Beach		Michel Bory		Switzerland
Swiss Information - Short Animation Films
Anima		Ernst Ansorge, Gisèle Ansorge		Switzerland
Aventures	Adventures	Otmar Gutmann		Switzerland
Das Kleine Trickfilmbrevier	The Small Cartoon Brevivier	Dany Hummel, Jörg Stadler		Switzerland
Die Nummer	The Number	Peter Haas		Switzerland
Elzeard		Roberto Ostinelli		Switzerland
Etude De La Biologie Animale	Study of Animal Biology	Robi Engler		Switzerland
Fitness		Gilbert Mayer		Switzerland
Hors-Jeu	Offside	Georges Schwizgebel		Switzerland
La Cage Du Loup	The Wolf Cage	Martial Wannaz		Switzerland
Made In Hong-Kong		Georges Dufaux		Switzerland
Marche Noir	Black Market	Claude Luyet		Switzerland
One Of Those Quiet Days In The Tube Factory		Heinz Schmid		Switzerland
Smile 1 + 2 + 3		Giisèle Ansorge, Ernst Ansorge		Switzerland
Swiss Graffiti		Monique Renault, Jacqueline Veuve		Switzerland
The Four Seasons		Hans Glanzmann		Switzerland

== Official Awards ==
=== International Jury ===
- Golden Leopard: The Idlers of the Fertile Valley directed by Nikos Panayotopoulos
- Silver Leopard: POKOJ Z WIDOKIEM NA MORZE by Janusz Zaorski
- Bronze Leopard: GIRLFRIENDS directed by Claudia Weill, awardee Melanie Mayron
- Ernest Artaria Prize: BAARA by Souleymane Cissé, CSEPLO GYURI by Pal Schiffer
- International Jury Mention: BAKO, L’AUTRE RIVE by Jacques Champreux

=== Oecumenical Jury ===
- Oecumenical Jury’s honor diploma: CSEPLO GYURI by Pal Schiffer, BAKO, L’AUTRE RIVE by Jacques Champreux, BAARA by Souleymane Cissé

=== FIPRESCI Jury ===
- International Critics mention: LA PETITE VILLE D’ANARA by Irakly Kvirikadzé, POKOJ Z WIDOKIEM NA MORZE by Janusz Zaorski, LA MORTE AL LAVORO by Gianni Amelio

=== Women’s Jury ===
- Women’s Jury Prize: FLUCHTWEG NACH MARSEILLE by Ingemo Engstöm and Gerhard Theuring
