= 27th Locarno Film Festival =

Film festival in Locarno, Switzerland

- Location: Locarno, Switzerland
- Founded: 1946
- Awards: Golden Leopard: 25 Fire Engine Street directed by Istvan Szabo.
- Artistic director: Moritz de Hadeln
- Festival date: Opening: 1 August 1974; Closing: 11 August 1974
- Website: Locarno Film Festival

Locarno Film Festival
- 28th 26th

The 27th Locarno Film Festival was held from 1 to 11 August 1974 in Locarno, Switzerland. The festival showcased films from 17 countries. A retrospective of Swiss cinema was organized and sent by ex-artistic director Freddy Buache. One film which received considerable attention was Die Rote Pest [The Red Plague] (1938), a Swiss film that, at the time, was considered anonymously created and was theorized to be produced by ultra-conservative bankers and Nazis. Other films of note were Roland Klick's gay film Supermarket and John Waters' underground film Pink Flamingos.

The Golden Leopard, the festival's top prize, was awarded to 25 Fire Engine Street directed by Istvan Szabo.

== Jury ==
=== International Competition ===
- Dominique Benichetti, French film director
- Robert Cordier, Belgium-U.S director.
- Simon Edelstein, Swiss director
- Ansano Giannarelli, Italian director
- Imre Gyoengyoessy, Hungarian director
- Yuli Raizman, Soviet director
- John Russel Taylor, British writer
- Krzysztof Zanussi, Polish director

== Official Sections ==
The following films were screened in these sections:

=== Main Program ===
Main Program / Feature Films In Competition

Original Title	English Title	Director(s)	Year	Production Country
27 Down Bombay-Varanasi Express		Awtar Krishna Kaul	1974	India
A Bigger Splash		Jack Hazan	1974	Great Britain
Al Yazerly	The Adventure	Kaiss Al-Zubaidi		Syria
Aundar Anapu	Ignorant	Rafael Corkidi	1974	Mexico
Celine Et Julie Vont En Bateau	Celine and Julie Go Boating	Jacques Rivette	1974	France
Claudine		John Berry	1974	United States
Contes Immoraux	Immoral Tales	Walerian Borowczyk	1974	France
Daisy Miller		Peter Bogdanovich	1974	United States
Der Nackte Mann Auf Dem Sportplatz	The Naked Man on the Sports Field	Konrad Wolf	1974	Germany
Die Auslieferung	The Delivery	Peter van Gunten	1974	Switzerland
La Brigade	The Brigade	René Gilson	1974	France
La Gueule Ouverte	The Mouth Agape	Maurice Pialat	1974	France
Lyutyy	Fierce	Tolomouch Okeev		Russia
Maa On Syntinen Laulu	The Earth is a Sinful Song	Rauni Mollberg	1973	Finland
Montreal Main		Frank Vitale	1974	Canada
Mors Hus	Mother's House	Per Blom	1974	Norway
Mulungu	Week	Beat Kuert		Switzerland
On N'Engraisse Pas Les Cochons A L'Eau Claire	Pigs Are Seldom Clean	Jean-Pierre Lefebvre	1973	Canada
Palec boży	Thumb Shoes	Antoni Krauze	1974	Poland
Prevroiavane Na Divite Zaitsi	Breadcrumbs	Edourad Zakhariev	1973	Bulgaria
Supermarkt	Supermarket	Roland Klick	1974	Germany
Tüzolto Utca 25	25 Fire Engine Street	Istvan Szabo	1973	Hungary

Main Program / Feature Films Out of Competition

Original Title	English Title	Director(s)	Year	Production Country
Jatun Auka	Jaitun Oka	Jorge Sanjinés		Bolivia
La Paloma	The Dove	Daniel Schmid	1974	Switzerland
Le Milieu Du Monde	The Middle of the World	Alain Tanner	1974	Switzerland

=== Critics Week ===
FIPRESCI - International Federation of Film Critics Week
Original Title	English Title	Director(s)	Year	Production Country
Die Letzten Heimposamenter	The Last Home Posevia	Yves Yersin		Switzerland
Giron		Manuel Herrera	1972	Cuba
Kimen	The Germ	Erik Solbakken		Norway
La Folle De Toujane		Nicole Le Garrec, René Vautier		France
La Victoria	The Victory	Peter Lilienthal		Germany
Leben Mit Uwe	Life with Uwe	Lothar Warneke		Germany

=== Special Sections ===
==== Special Information Program ====
Main Program / Special Information Program
Original Title	English Title	Director(s)	Year	Production Country
Romans O Vljublennyh		Andrei Mikhalkov-Kontchalovsky	1974	Russia
Steppenwolf		Fred Haines	1974	Switzerland
Zagreb À Locarno	Zagreb in Locarno			

==== Tribute To Italian Cinema ====
Original Title	English Title	Director(s)	Year	Production Country
La Circostanza	The Circumstance	Ermanno Olmi	1973	Italy

==== Free Forum ====
Free Forum
Alice In Den Städten	Alice in the Cities	Wim Wenders	Germany
Der Schwarze Engel	The Black Angel	Werner Schroeter	Germany
La Maman Et La Putain	The Mom and the Whore	Jean Eustache	France
Lancelot Du Lac		Robert Bresson	France
Martha		Rainer Werner Fassbinder	Germany
Mean Streets		Martin Scorsese	United States
Out One Spectre		Jacques Rivette	France
Pink Flamingos		John Waters	United States
San Michele Aveva Un Gallo	St. Michael Had a Rooster	Vittorio Taviani, Paolo Taviani	Italy
Some Call It Loving		James B. Harris	United States
Sweet Movie		Dušan Makavejev	France, Canada
Yek Tefach E Sadeh		Sohrab Shahid-Saless	Iran

=== Swiss Cinema ===
Swiss Cinema Retrospective (1920-1948)
Original Title	English Title	Director(s)	Year	Production Country
13 Grand'Rue		Jean Brocher	1934	Switzerland
Afrikaflug II	Africa Flight II	Walter Mittelholzer	1930	Switzerland
Die Rote Pest	The Red Plague	Franz Riedweg von Blomberg	1938	Switzerland
Kleine Scheidegg (Im Banne Der Jungfrau)	Little Scheidegg (in the Banna of the Virgin)	Richard Schwieizer	1937	Switzerland
L'Appel De La Montagne	The Mountain Call	Arthur Adrien Porchet	1923	Switzerland
Le Voyage Imprevu	Unplanned Journey	Jean de Limur	1934	Switzerland
Notre Armee	Our Army	Jacques Béranger, Arthur Adrien Porchet	1939	Switzerland
Petronella		Hannes Schwarz	1927	Switzerland
Swiss Information
Le Troisieme Cri	The Third Cry	Igaal Niddam		Switzerland
Smog		Christian Mottier		Switzerland
Tag Der Affen	Day of the Monkey	Uli Meier		Switzerland
Swiss Information - Special Projections Ticino Program
Armand Schulthess - J'ai Le Telephone		Hans-Ulrich Schlumpf		Switzerland
Cerchiamo Per Subito Operai, Offriamo...	We Look for Workers for Immediately, We Offer...	Villi Hermann		Switzerland
La Nuova Mappa	The New Map	Thomas Schütz, Balthasar von Schenk		Switzerland

== Official Awards ==
=== International Jury ===
- Golden Leopard: TÜZOLTO UTCA 25 by Istvan Szabo
- International Jury Second Prize, Silver Leopard: A BIGGER SPLASH by Jack Hazan, PALEC BOZY by Antoni Krauze
- International Jury Prize: CÉLINE AND JULIE GO BOATING by Jacques Rivette
- International Jury special Prize for the best first Feature: THE EARTH IS A SINFUL SONG by Rauni Molberg
- International Jury Mention: LYUTYY by Tolomouch Okeev, DIE AUSLIEFERUNG by Peter van Gunten

=== Oecumenical Jury ===
- Oecumenical Prize: 27 DOWN BOMBAY-VARANASI EXPRESS by Awtar Krishna Kaul, TÜZOLTO UTCA 25 by Istvan Szabo
- Oecumenic Jury recommendation: PREVROIAVANE NA DIVITE ZAITSI by Edourad Zakhariev, THE EARTH IS A SINFUL SONG by Rauni Molberg, KIMEN by Erik Solbakken, AUNDAR ANAPU by Rafael Corkidi
- Oecumenical Jury Special Mention: Alain Tanner

=== FIPRESCI Jury ===
- International Critic's Award: LA CIRCOSTANZA by Ermanno Olmi
- Cinegram Prize: A BIGGER SPLASH by Jack Hazan
