= 34th Locarno Film Festival =

Film festival in Locarno, Switzerland

- Location: Locarno, Switzerland
- Founded: 1946
- Awards: Golden Leopard: Chakra directed by Rabindra Dharmaraj
- Artistic director: Jean-Pierre Brossard
- Festival date: Opening: 31 July 1981; Closing: 10 August 1981
- Website: LFF

Locarno Film Festival
- 35th 33rd

The 34th Locarno Film Festival was held from 31 July to 10 August 1981 in Locarno, Switzerland. This was Jean-Pierre Brossard's last year as festival director. It included a popular retrospective of 1950s U.S. films and midnight showings of films such as Polyester directed by John Waters.

The screening of Pier Palo Pasolini's Salo was so crowded that it was screened twice due to audience demand. There was a planned surprise showing of jury member Andrzej Żuławski's 1972 film The Devil , which had been banned by the Polish government, but the print never arrived causing Zulawski to wonder at the time if it was still banned. Indeed, the film was banned in Poland until 1987.

The Golden Leopard, the festival's top prize, was awarded to Chakra directed by Rabindra Dharmaraj.

== Jury ==
- Assia Djebar, Algerian filmmaker and author
- Jean Douchet, French film critic
- Paul Morrissey, American filmmaker
- Andrej Zulawski, Polish director
- George Radonowicz, Swiss director and producer

== Official Sections 1981 ==
The following films were screened in these sections:

=== Main Program ===
==== Feature Films In Competition ====
English Title	Original Title	Director(s)	Production Country
Trances	Al Hal	Ahmed El Maanouni	Morocco
Beto Nervio and Super-Super, Against the Black Night	Beto Nervio Y Super-Super, Contra La Noche Negra	Miguel Bejo	Argentina
The Loveless (originally titled Breakdown)		Kathryn Bigelow, Monty Montgomery	USA
Celeste		Percy Adlon	Germany
Chakra		Rabindra Dharmaraj	India
Diana and Django	Diana E Django	Solveig Nordlund	Portugal
Diva		Jean-Jacques Beneix	France
Djeli	Djeli, Conte D'Aujourd'Hui	Fadika Kramo-Lanciné	Ivory Coast
Duet	Duetto	Tomao Sherman	Italy
Childish Questions	Dziecinne Pytani	Janus Zaorski	Poland
Land of Fire All Night Long	E Nachtlang Füürland	Clemens Klopfenstein, Remo Legnazzi	Switzerland
Fear Not, Jacob!	Fürchte Dich Nicht, Jakob!	Radu Gabrea	Germany
Death of a Tycoon	Muerte De Un Magnate	Francisco Jose Lombardi	Peru
Narcissus and Psyche	Narcisz Es Psyche	Gabor Body	Hungary
One More Chance		Sam Firstenberg	USA
Pixote		Hector Babenco	Brazil
Alone	Seuls	Francis Reusser	Switzerland
The Dark End Of The Street		Jan Egleson	USA
A One-Way Ticket	Un Aller Simple	Hadj Rahim	Algérie
The Option, Roses of the Road	Opçao, As Rosas Da Estrada	Ozualdo Ribeira Candeias	Brazil*

==== Out of Competition ====
Feature Films - Out of Competition
Original Title	English Title	Director(s)	Year	Production country
Akaler Sandhane	Lonely	Mrinal Sen	1981	India
Czlowiek Z Zelaza	Iron Man	Andrzej Wajda	1981	Poland
Francisca		Manoel de Oliveira	1981	Portugal
La Femme De L'Aviateur	The Aviator's Wife	Éric Rohmer	1981	France
Looks And Smiles		Ken Loach	1981	Great Britain
Mephisto		Istvan Szabo	1981	Hungary
Ricomincio Da Tre	I Start Again from Three	Massimo Troisi	1981	Italy
Special Section / Out of Program
L'Erroneo Fu	The Erroneous Was	Brenno Martignoni	1981	Switzerland
Madame Wang		Paul Morrissey	1980	USA
Possession		Andrzej Zulawski	1981	France, Germany

=== Algerian Special Sections ===
Algerian Special Sections / Week
Original Title	English Title	Director(s)	Year	Production Country
Boualem Zi El Gouden	Boulmem Zi-Elements	Moussa Haddad	1980	Algérie
Chebka		Ghaouti Bendeddouche	1976	Algérie
El Faham	El Understands	Mohamed Bouamari	1972	Algérie
La Nouba Des Femmes Du Mont Chenoua	The Nouba of the Women of Mount Chenoua	Assia Djebar	1978	Algérie
Le Retour	The Return	Benamar Bakhti	1980	Algérie
Omar Gatlato		Merzak Allouache	1976	Algérie
Ouled Er Rih	T	Brahim Tsaki	1979	Algérie
Rakem 49	Rakem	Mohamed Rachid Benhadj	1980	Algérie
Rih El Aures	House and	Mohamed Lakhdar-Hamina	1966	Algérie

=== Special Sections ===
==== American Cinema of the 1950s ====
American Cinema of the 1950s
Title	Director(s)	Year	Production Country
A Place In The Sun	George Stevens	1951	USA
A Touch Of Evil	Orson Welles	1958	USA
Asphalt Jungle	John Huston	1950	USA
Baby Doll	Elia Kazan	1956	USA
Bigger Than Life	Nicholas Ray	1956	USA
Born Yesterday	George Cukor	1950	USA
Bus Stop	Joshua Logan	1956	USA
Elmer Gantry	Richard Brooks	1959	USA
From Here To Eternity	Fred Zinnemann	1953	USA
Hollywood On Trial	David Helpern	1976	USA
Jet Pilot	Josef von Sternberg	1951	USA
North By Northwest	Alfred Hitchcock	1959	USA
Pick Up On South Street	Samuel Fuller	1952	USA
Ruby Gentry	King Vidor	1955	USA
The Hollywood Ten	John Berry	1950	USA
The Quiet American	Joseph L. Mankiewicz	1958	USA
The Searchers	John Ford	1956	USA
The Thing	Howard Hawks, Christian Nyby	1951	USA
The Wild One	Laslo Benedek	1954	USA
Wild River	Elia Kazan	1959	USA
Written On The Wind	Douglas Sirk	1957	USA

==== Carte Blanche to Daniel Schmid ====
A Daniel Schmid organized screening of films he selected.

Carte Blanche to Daniel Schmid
Original title	English title	Director(s)	Year	Production country
Gertrud		Carl-Theodor Dreyer	1946	Denmark
Le Charme Discret De La Bourgeoisie	The Discreet Charm of the Bourgeoisie	Luis Buñuel	1972	France
Le Diable Probablement	The Devil Probably	Robert Bresson	1977	France
Neskol'Ko Dnej Iz Zizni I.I. Oblomova	Several Days of the Life of I.I. Oblomova	Nikita Mikhalkov	1979	Russia
Salò O Le Centoventi Giornate Di Sodoma	Salò or the One Hundred and Twenty Days of Sodoma	Pier Paolo Pasolini	1976	Italy
The Shangai Gesture		Josef von Sternberg	1941	USA

==== Swiss Information ====
Swiss Information - Feature Films
Original title	English title	Director(s)	Year	Production country
Das Boot Ist Voll	The Boat is Full	Markus Imhoof		Switzerland
Der Erfinder	The Inventor	Kurt Gloor		Switzerland
Die Rückkehr (Stolz)	The Return (Proud)	Friedrich Kappeler		Switzerland
Eine Vo Dene	A Vo Dene	Bruno Nick		Switzerland
Heritage		Walter Marti		Switzerland
Light Years Away		Alain Tanner		Switzerland
Max Frisch, Journal I-Iii		Richard Dindo		Switzerland
Moon In Taurus		Steff Gruber		Switzerland
Nestbruch		Beat Kuert		Switzerland
Reisender Krieger	Traveler Warrior	Christian Schocher		Switzerland
Samba Lento	Samba	Bruno Moll		Switzerland
Sirenen-Eiland	Sirenen Island	Isa Hesse-Rabinovitch		Switzerland
Zur Besserung Der Person	To Improve the Person	Heinz Bütler		Switzerland
Züri Brännt	Brush Brushes			Switzerland
Swiss Information - Short And Medium-Length Films
Beredino		Danilo Catti		Switzerland
Go West, Young Man		Urs Egger		Switzerland
La Facture D'Orgue	The Organ Bill	Frédéric Gonseth		Switzerland
Le Cours Des Choses	The Course of Things	Jean-Bernard Menoud		Switzerland
Poursuite	Pursuit	Robi Engler		Switzerland
Pssst		B. Willy Nussbaum		Switzerland
Revol		Mona Etter-Faloughi, Charles Herberger		Switzerland
Räume Sin Hüllen, Sind Häuten, Sind Cocons	Rooms are Covers, are Skinning, are Cocons	Lukas Strebel		Switzerland
Schnürz Und Schnörz	Schnürz and Schnörz	Tassilo Dellers, Sebastian Dellers		Switzerland
Sweet Reading		Michel Rodde		Switzerland

==== Film Critics Week ====
FIPRESCI - International Federation of Film Critics Week
Original title	English title	Director(s)	Year	Production country
Cserepek	Pots	Istvan Gaal		Hungary
Gregory'S Girl		Bill Forsyth		Great Britain
Indeks	Index	Janusz Kijowski	1978	Poland
Laufen Lernen	Learn	Jutta Brückner		Germany
Le Sang Du Flamboyant	The Blood of the Flamboyant	François Migeat		France
Winterstadt		Bernhard Giger		Switzerland

== Official Awards ==
=== International Jury ===
- Golden Leopard: Chakra directed by Rabindra Dharmaraj
- Silver Leopard: Pixote directed by Hector Babenco
- Bronze Leopard: Opçao, As Rosas Da Estrada directed by Ozualdo Ribeira Candeias
- Ernst Artaria Prize: Narcissus and Psyche directed by Gabor Body
