= 35th Locarno Film Festival =

Film festival in Locarno, Switzerland

- Location: Locarno, Switzerland
- Founded: 1946
- Awards: Four Special Jury Mentions; Special Locarno Prize to Das Letzte Loch (The Last Hole) directed by Herbert Achternbusch
- Artistic director: David Strieff
- Festival date: Opening: 6 August 1982; Closing: 15 August 1982
- Website: LFF

Locarno Film Festival
- 36th 34th

The 35th Locarno Film Festival was held from 6 to 15 August 1982 in Locarno, Switzerland. This was David Strieff's first year as director following the departure of Jean-Pierre Brossard. A retrospective of Powell and Pressburger films was screened, which coincided with the burgeoning recognition of their work as "auteurs" in film circles. Michael Powell attended the festival and gave a talk about auteurism with Swiss director Markus Imhoof, and Gaumont studio head Daniel Toscan du Plantier.

Douglas Sirk attended the screening of documentary Rainer Werner Fassbinder dreht "Querelle" (Rainer Werner Fassbinder Shoots "Querelle"), and sung its praises telling the director Dieter Schidor, a long-time Fassbinder collaborator, that it was "...a real film, much more than a documentary." This was despite the omission of a 14-minute interview Rainer Werner Fassbinder gave hours before his death that had to be cut due to a German court injunction. Fassbinder's mother got the injunction as she did not want people to see footage of him sick.

No Golden Leopard or any other festival prizes were awarded this year, despite this year being considered a good one at Locarno, because the jury claimed the best films could not be ranked over each other and four films were given Special Mentions. It was revealed that the Jury felt that the mix of art-house films against expensive prestige and commercial productions was unfair. Festival organizers quickly assembled an ad-hoc jury to award a Special Locarno Prize and 10,000 Francs to Das Letzte Loch (The Last Hole) directed by Herbert Achternbusch.

== Jury ==
- Markus Imhoof, Swiss film director
- Jerzy Skolimowski, Polish film director and screenwriter
- Judith Elek, Hungarian film director
- Sandro Zambetti, Italian film critic
- Daniel Toscan du Plantir, Gaumont studio chief

== Official Sections ==
The following films were screened in these sections:

=== Main Program ===
==== In Competition - Feature Films ====
Original Title	English Title	Director(s)	Production Country
At	The Horse	Alo Ozgenturk	Turkey
Das Letzte Loch	The Last Hole	Herbert Achternbusch	Germany
Forty Deuce		Paul Morrissey	USA
Imagi Ninghtem		Aribam Syam Sharma	India
Klassengeflüster	Class Murmurs	Nino Jacusso, Franz Richenbach	Switzerland
La Boda	The Wedding	Thaelman Urgelles	Venezuela
La Plaza Del Diamante	The Diamond Square	Francesc Betriu	Spain
Les Jocondes		Jean-Daniel Pillault	France
Panelkapcsolat	The Prefab People	Béla Tarr	Hungary
Parti Sans Laisser D'Adresse	Left without Leaving an Address	Jacqueline Veuve	Switzerland
Processo A Caterina Ross	The Trial of Caterina Ross	Gabriella Rosaleva	Italia
Quartetto Basileus	Baselus Quartet	Fabio Carpi	Italia
Thorvald Og Linda	The Ballad of Linda	Sven Gronlykke and Lene Gronlykke	Denmark
To Ergostasio	The Factory	Tassos Psarras	Greece
Traveller		Joe Comerford	Iceland
Uno Entre Muchos	One among many	Ariel Zuñiga	Mexico
Wênd Kûuni	God's Gift	Gaston Kaboré	France

==== Out of Competition - Feature Films ====
Original Title	English Title	Director(s)	Production Country
Doro No Kawa	The Side of the Doro	Kohei Oguri	Japan
Hammett		Wim Wenders	USA
Irezumi	Tattoo	Yoichi Takabayshi	Japan
La Notte Di San Lorenzo	The Night of San Lorenzo	Paolo and Vittorio Taviani	Italia
Megall Az Idö	The Time	Péter Gothar	Hungary
Melvin And Howard		Jonathan Demme	USA
Moonlighting		Jerzy Skolimovski	Great Britain
Mourir A Trente Ans	Half a Life	Roman Goupil	France
Yol	Way	Serif Gören	Turkey

=== Retrospective - Powell & Pressburger ===
Original Title	English Title	Director(s)	Year	Production Country
49th Parallel		Michael Powell, Emeric Pressburger	1941	Great Britain
A Canterbury Tale		Michael Powell, Emeric Pressburger	1944	Great Britain
A Matter Of Life And Death		Michael Powell, Emeric Pressburger	1946	Great Britain
An Airman's Letter To His Mother		Michael Powell	1941	Great Britain
Black Narcissus		Michael Powell, Emeric Pressburger	1947	Great Britain
Gone To Earth		Michael Powell, Emeric Pressburger	1950	Great Britain
I Know Where I'M Going		Michael Powell, Emeric Pressburger	1945	Great Britain
Peeping Tom		Michael Powell	1960	Great Britain
The Edge Of The World		Michael Powell	1937	Great Britain
The Elusive Pimpernel		Michael Powell, Emeric Pressburger	1950	Great Britain
The Life And Death Of Colonel Blimp		Michael Powell, Emeric Pressburger	1943	Great Britain
The Red Shoe'S Sketches		Michael Powell, Emeric Pressburger	1948	Great Britain
The Small Back Room		Michael Powell, Emeric Pressburger	1949	Great Britain
The Spy In Black		Michael Powell	1939	Great Britain
The Tales Of Hoffmann		Michael Powell, Emeric Pressburger	1951	Great Britain
The Thief Of Bagdad		Ludwig Berger, Michael Powell	1940	Great Britain
The Volunteer		Michael Powell, Emeric Pressburger	1943	Great Britain

=== Special Sections ===
==== Hommage to Sergei Eisenstein ====
The Office of Eisenstein: From Drawings to Films
Bejin Loug	Bezhin Meadow	Sergei M. Eisenstein	1936	Russia
Dnievnik Gloumova	Glumov's Diary	Sergei M. Eisenstein	1923	Russia
Ivan Grozni	Ivan the Terrible	Sergei M. Eisenstein	1944	Russia

==== Mexican National Cinema Week ====
Mexican National Week
Original title	English title	Director(s)	Year	Production country
Cadena Perpetua	Life Imprisonment	Arturo Ripstein, Arturo Ripstein	1978	Mexico
Cafe Tacuba		Jorge Prior	1982	Mexico
Canoa	Canoe	Felipe Cazals	1975	Mexico
El Lugar Sin Limites	The Place without Limits	Arturo Ripstein, Arturo Ripstein	1977	Mexico
En La Trampa	In the Trap	Raul Araiza	1978	Mexico
La Isla De La Pasion	The Island of the Passion	Emilio Fernandez	1941	Mexico
Maria De Mi Corazon	MARIA DE MY HEART	Jaime Humberto Hermosillo	1979	Mexico
Niño Fidencio	Fidencio Child	Nicolas Echevarria	1980	Mexico

==== Carte Blanche Selections by Markus Imhoof ====
Carte Blanche Sections by Markus Imhoof
Original Title	English Title	Director(s)	Year	Production Country
Fat City		John Huston	1972	USA
Greed		Erich von Stroheim		USA
La Grande Illusion	The Great Illusion	Jean Renoir	1937	France
Los Olvidados	The Forgotten	Luis Buñuel	1950	Mexico
Opening Night		John Cassavetes	1977	USA
Rocco E I Suoi Fratelli	Rocco and His Brothers	Luchino Visconti	1960	Italia

==== Out of Program & Special Program ====
Out of Program
Original title	English title	Director(s)	Year	Production country
Das Schleisische Tor	The Schleisian Gate	Clemens Klopfenstein		Germany
Drimage		Silvio Soldini		USA
Special Program
Effetto Olmi	Olmi Effect	Mario Brenta		Italia
Le Festival De Locarno Dans Le Miroir Du Cine Journal Suisse	The Locarno Festival in the Cine Journal Swiss Mirror			Switzerland
Novy Vavilon	New Babylon	Grigori Kozintzev, Leonid Trauberg	1929	Russia
Parsifal		Hans-Jürgen Syberberg		Germany
Rainer Werner Fassbinder Dreht Querelle	Rainer Werner Fassbinder Shoots "Querelle"	Dieter Schidor		Germany
Sonezaki Shinju	Sonezaki Pearl	Midori Kurisaki		Japan
Vizsgalat Martinovics Ignac, Szaszvari Apat Es Tarsai Ügyben	Examination Martinovics Ignac, Sasvari Apat and Tarsai Case	Judith Elek		Hungary

== Parallel Screenings ==
=== Film Critics Week ===
FIPRESCI - International Federation of Film Critics Week
Original Title	English Title	Director(s)	Year	Production Country
Cinq Et La Peau	Five and the Skin	Pierre Rissient		France
Dakhal	Interfering	Goutam Ghose		India
Die Zeit Böse	The Time Evil	Beat Kuert		Switzerland
Kettevalt Mennyezet	Dowry Ceiling	Pal Gabor		Hungary
Nacht Der Wölfe	Night of the Wolves	Rüdiger Nüchtern		Germany
No Eran Nadie	They Were Nobody	Sergio Bravo-Ramos		Chile

=== Swiss Information ===
Swiss Information Feature Films
Original title	English title	Director(s)	Year	Production country
Claire Et L'Obscur	Claire and the Dark	Costa Haralambis		Switzerland
Das Flugjahr	The Flight Year	Markus Fischer		Switzerland
Die Unterbrochene Spur	The Interrupted Track	Mathias Knauer		Switzerland
Ludwig Hohl		Alexander J. Seiler		Switzerland
Matlosa		Villi Hermann		Switzerland
Unsere Eltern Haben Den Ausweis C 1. Schichtwechsel 2. Schulweg Zwischen Zwei Welten	Our Parents Have the ID C 1. Shift Change 2. School Path Between Two Worlds	Eduard Winiger		Switzerland
Windplätze Aufgerissen	Wind Places Opened	Pius Morger		Switzerland
Swiss Information Short And Means Films
A L'Ombre De La Peste	To L'ombre of the Plague	Martial Wannaz		Switzerland
Chormann		Lukas Strebel		Switzerland
Der Geringste Winderstand	The Slightest Resistance	Peter Fischli		Switzerland
Die Verkehrsmeldung	The Traffic Message	Alex Brunner		Switzerland
Il Ponte	The Bridge	Rainaldo Zambrano		Switzerland
Inventaire Lausannois	Lausanne Inventory	Yves Yersin		Switzerland
La Solution!		Maurice Giacomini, Luca Ionel		Switzerland
Le Ravissement De Frank N. Stein	The Delight of Frank N. Stein	Georges Schwizgebel		Switzerland
Lettre A Freddy Buache	Letter to Freddy Buache	Jean-Luc Godard		Switzerland
Voyage Jusqu'A L'Aube	Voyage to Dawn	Christiane Kolla		Switzerland

== Official Awards ==
=== International Jury ===
- Official Jury Mention:
  - The Prefab People by Béla Tarr
  - Les Jocondes directed by Jean-Daniel Pillault
  - Basileus Quartet directed by Fabio Carpi
  - Traveller directed by Joe Comerford

=== Ad-Hoc Jury ===
- Special Locarno Prize 1982: Das Letzte Loch (The Last Hole) directed by Herbert Achternbusch

=== FIPRESCI International Jury ===
- FIPRESCI Prize: Klassengeflüster (Class Murmurs) directed by Nino Jacusso and Franz Richenbach
