= Fertile Valley =

Fertile Valley may refer to:

- Rural Municipality of Fertile Valley No. 285, Saskatchewan, Canada
- Fertile Valley No. 429, Alberta, Canada; a former municipal district, now part of Ponoka County

== See also ==
- The Idlers of the Fertile Valley, a 1978 Greek film
- Rural Municipality of Fertile Belt No. 183, Saskatchewan, Canada
- Soil fertility § Global distribution, regions of fertile soil across the world
