= A Peasant Chronicle in Gruyere =

- Chronique paysanne en Gruyère
- Directed by: Jacqueline Veuve
- Written by: Jacqueline Veuve
- Produced by: Thierry Garrel; Jacqueline Veuve
- Cinematography: Hugues Ryffel
- Edited by: Edwige Ochsenbein
- Music by: André-Daniel Meylan
- Production companies: Aquarius Film; La Sept; Les Films du phare Les Productions JMH; Télévision Suisse-Romande
- Release date: 1990
- Running time: 100 minutes
- Countries: Switzerland; France
- Language: French

A Peasant Chronicle in Gruyere (French: Chronique paysanne en Gruyère) is a 1990 French documentary that was written and directed by Jacqueline Veuve.

== Synopsis ==
This film follows a Swiss family, the Bapsts, who are peasant farmers in Gruyère, La Roche. The film documents a year in their lives and details the many crafts they utilize to make a living.

The film begins in the Swiss Alps where the Bapst family has a summer cottage. You see Conrad and his daughter-in-law go through the tedious process of creating Gruyère cheese (in the form of a large wheel), which they then send to his wife in the village where she can sell them. Conrad's son is also shown tending to the cattle. Conrad believes that because the cattle eats from grass that is untouched by fertilizer, the cheese produced has a better and more distinguishable taste. Conrad's grandchildren - who call him "Godfather"- are also there, and have their share of chores to do to help out.

Once the fall season comes, the family migrates, along with their cows, back to the village in the ceremonial journey called "the descent". In this ceremony, the family and their florally adorned cattle take the seven hour journey from the mountains to the valley where their home village is.

The remainder of the film focuses on the fall and winter activities of the family members - from felling trees, tending to their livestock, welding, and cooking for a feast. The film comes full-circle when spring time arrives again and the family prepares to venture back to the alps. During this time, there is a "Dairymen's Mass" where the village priest blesses the land and the farmers for the upcoming planting and harvest seasons.

== Cast ==
- Bapst, Conrad
- Bapst, Louise
- Bapst, Romain
- Bapst, Jacques
- Bapst, Maurice
- Bapst, Céline

== Director ==
This film was directed by Jacqueline Veuve, a Swiss director and anthropologist. A Peasant Chronicle in Gruyère is just one of her many ethnographic films. Veuve directed another film about the Bapst family featured in A Peasant Chronicle in Gruyère called The Bapst Brothers, Carters. This film focuses on Conrad Bapst, his three sons, and their adventures in the business of felling trees.

== Reception ==
A Peasant Chronicle in Gruyère was presented at the film festival "Festival dei Popoli" in Italy, in 2010, along with other recognized Swiss films. Verena Zimmermann of the Solothurn Newspaper positively reviews the film and states that, "Jacqueline Veuve beats a wide bow with a light hand." The film won the "Award for Outstanding Quality" from the Swiss Federal Department of Home and Cultural Affairs.
