= Bergamo Film Meeting =

- Location: Bergamo, Italy
- Founded: 1983
- Directors: Fiammetta Girola, Annamaria Materazzini, Angelo Signorelli (retired)
- Website: https://www.bergamofilmmeeting.it/

Logo BFM 2015

Bergamo Film Meeting is a film festival held every March in Bergamo, Lombardy. The festival was founded by Sandro Zambetti and Angelo Signorelli in 1983. As of 2023, it has an annual attendance of 70000 and offers more than 150 screenings in its program.

== Profile ==
Bergamo Film Meeting was founded in 1983 by Sandro Zambetti and Angelo Signorelli and managed by Associazione Bergamo Film Meeting ONLUS.

Initially established as a non-competitive film exhibition, in 1987 the festival introduced a competitive section Mostra Concorso. The main prize Rosa Camuna in gold, silver and bronze was distributed by audience voting. Since the 2009 edition, the prize has taken the name Bergamo Film Meeting Prize and from 2013 a cash prize is also awarded to the winning film in the section.

The international competition includes feature films by emerging authors that have not been released in Italy. Every year more than 150 films are selected for the festival's program.

In 2012, the city government of Bergamo awarded the festival with a Gold Medal of Civic Recognition.

By 2016, the festival had screened more than 3,800 films, released 434 films, and published more than 101 books about cinema, including monographs and catalogs for every edition. The annual attendance raised up to 70000 visitors.

At the 42th edition of the festival in 2024, Signorelli announced his retirement and entrusted the festival to his co-directors Fiammetta Girola and Annamaria Materazzini.

=== Sections ===
- Mostra Concorso is the international competition program.
- Kino Club is a section for audiences of 6–18 years that offers film screenings, workshops and laboratories.
- Visti da vicino is a section for documentaries.
- Anteprime nazionali
- Europe, Now! is a two-days industry meeting that includes a selection of graduate films from European film schools.

== Editions ==
=== 2025 ===
The 43rd edition of the Bergamo Film Meeting took place from March 8 to 16, 2025. The edition featured a line-up of 160 short and feature films, a retrospective of Otar Iosseliani and an homage to Wojciech Jerzy Has, as well as the full back-catalogues of Alice Nellis and Christian Petzold. In the Exhibition competition, first prize went to Gina, directed by Austrian filmmaker Ulrike Kofler. Second prize went to Bitter Gold by Juan Olea, third prize — Lazy Girls by Karim Dridi. Koya Kamura was selected Best Director for his debut feature Winter in Sokcho. Jury Special Mention — Personale by Carmen Trocker.

=== 2026 ===
The 44th edition of the festival ran from 7 to 15 March, 2026. Best Film Award went to Porte Bagage by Abdelkarim El-Fassi. The second place went to Hidden People by Slovenian director Miha Hočevar. The Frog and the Water by Thomas Stuber took the Jury Prize.
