= Carmen Trocker =

- Born: 1967 (age 58–59); South Tyrol

Carmen Trocker is a film director and festival curator.

Born in South Tyrol, Trocker studied in Bolzano and then in Berlin, where she graduated from the German Film and Television Academy Berlin (DFFB).

In Berlin, she worked as a freelance editor. Later she was curator of the documentary film program at the KUKI Young Short Film Festival. With her brother Ronny, Trocker founded an independent production company Bagarrefilm.

Her 2024 feature Personale premiered in the Luminous strand at the 2024 International Documentary Festival Amsterdam. The movie received Jury Special Mention at the Bergamo Film Meeting 2025 and won the Premio AAMOD at the Rome International Documentary Festival 2025. The feature "Personale" was awarded as best film in the Austrian competition at the This Human World Festival in Vienna 2025

== Filmography ==
- 1999 — Dort Oben Wo der Teufel Wohnt (Up there where the devil lives, doc);
- 2004 — Hanna - Porträt einer Bäuerin (Hanna day in, day out);
- 2016 — Das Haus (The House);
- 2024 — Personale.
