= Gábor Bachman =

Hungarian designer and architect

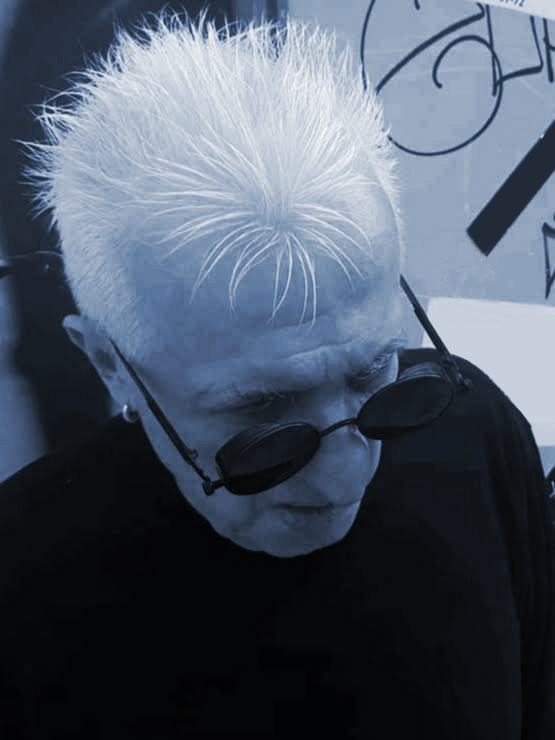
- Born: 24 June 1952 (age 73); Pécs, Hungary
- Occupations: designer and architect

Gábor Bachman (born 24 June 1952, in Pécs) is a Hungarian designer and architect.

== Biography ==
He attended the Budapest University of Technology and Architecture from 1971 to 1972 and then studied interior design at the College of Arts and Design from 1972 to 1977. From 1977 to 1991 he worked as a stage designer for a film production company, before becoming a freelance designer. In 1986, he won the Japanese International Architecture Competition in Tokyo.

In the 1990s, Bachman became a more internationally oriented artist.

== Style ==
Bachman's work is typically abstract, displaying futurism. His work has been referred to as "sensual radicalism", which he shared with his good friend, filmmaker Gábor Bódy. Some of his works in Budapest have been described as "architectural and classical ideotypes, succinctly versed in the constructivist tradition".
