= Narcissus and Psyche =

1980 Hungarian film directed by Gábor Bódy

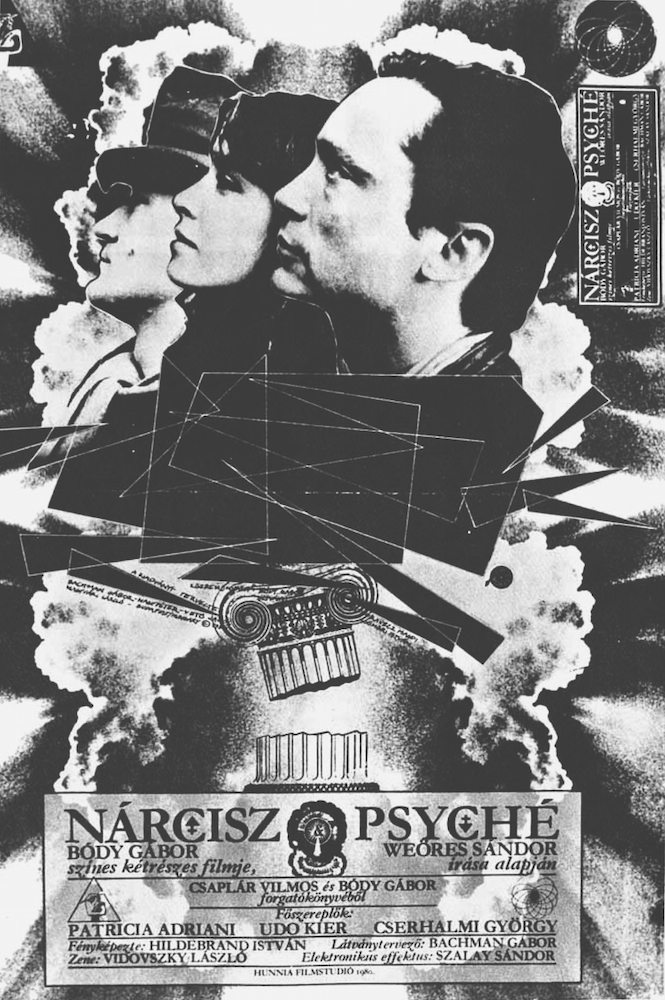
Film poster

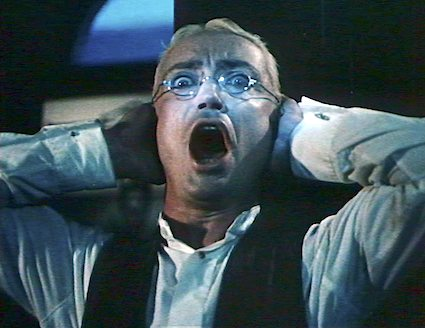
Screenshot

Narcissus and Psyche (Hungarian: Nárcisz és Psyché) is a 1980 Hungarian drama film directed by Gábor Bódy. It was adapted for the screen by Vilmos Csaplar from a Sándor Weöres novel. The film stars Patricia Adriani, Udo Kier, György Cserhalmi, János Derzsi, Miklós Erdély, János Pilinszky and other notable artists of the day. Art director, designer of this movie was Gábor Bachman. The soundtrack was partly composed, partly arranged and distorted from various classical scores by László Vidovszky.

== Reception ==
The Britannica describes the film as Bódy's "avant-garde masterpiece (...) full of surrealistic elements, philosophical allusions, and visual experimentation, spanning centuries". The New Orleans Review commented, "Perhaps the high level of technical competence in Hungary, the relatively lavish state support, and the leisurely schedule of production make it easier to be genuinely experimental".
