= Sandro Zambetti =

Italian journalist (1927–2014)

- Born: September 4, 1927; Ranzanico
- Died: June 6, 2014 (aged 86); Sariate
- Years active: 1948–2014

Sandro Zambetti (September 4, 1927 – June 6, 2014) was an Italian journalist and cinema critic, for more than 25 years he served as a director of the Bergamo Film Meeting film festival.

He studied in Milan. In 1948, right after graduation, he went to work at L'Eco di Bergamo and worked his way up to the position of editor-in-chief. Soon he emerged as an influential cinema critic. In the 1960s, he also contributed to Politica and Sette giorni in Italia e nel Mondo magazines. In 1970–78, he headed F.I.C., an Italian Cinema Federation. Also in 1970, he became a director of Cineforum, a cinema magazine.

In 1978, Zambetti co-founded and became a director of the Bergamo Film Meeting film festival.

In 1996, Zambetti created Fondazione Alasca di Bergamo, a documentation centre and archive dedicated to audiovisuals.

In 2009, he was removed from the editorship of Cineforum when he was only two years away from the 500-issue mark and the age of voluntary retirement. That event became a major blow for Zambetti and affected his health significantly.

Zambetti had a son, Matteo, and a daughter, Monica. Monica Zambetti died in 1993 at the age of 31, after which Zambetti had never fully recovered.
