= 36th Locarno Film Festival =

Film festival in Locarno, Switzerland

- Opening film: Confidentially Yours directed by François Truffaut
- Location: Locarno, Switzerland
- Founded: 1946
- Awards: Golden Leopard: The Princess directed by Pal Erdöss
- Artistic director: David Strieff
- Festival date: Opening: 5 August 1983; Closing: 14 August 1983
- Website: LFF

Locarno Film Festival
- 37th 35th

The 36th Locarno Film Festival was held from 5 to 14 August 1983 in Locarno, Switzerland. A new section and competition for TV movies was introduced this year. Ninety-four TV films were submitted with eighteen being selected for the competition, in-all around 70 TV movies were screened at the festival.

At the last year's festival no Golden Leopard, the top prize, was awarded by the Jury after they clashed with festival organizers over the competition featuring both art house and expensive commercial productions that made them hard to compare. To address the problem this year the organizers gave artistic director David Strieff sole power over the film selection rather than using a committee.

Additionally, all films in competition were show under the same conditions, unlike in the year before. The Piazza Grande, the 5,000 seat open-air theater, was reserved for out of competition films that would have bigger audiences.

The opening film was François Truffaut's brand new Confidentially Yours. The festival also held a 20 film retrospective on Japanese filmmaker, Mikio Naruse, whose film Yearning had won Hideko Takamine a best actress award at the 17th Locarno Film Festival 19 years before.

Despite the improvements, the Locarno festival still struggled against its rival the Venice Film Festival, which, one day before the Locarno festival, convinced distributor Orion to take the film Breathless out of Locarno and give it to Venice.

The Golden Leopard, the festival's top prize, was awarded to The Princess directed by Pal Erdöss.

== Jury, TV competition ==
- Alvin H. Marill, American film critic and biographer
- David Hare, British playwright
- Franco Rossi, Italian film and TV director
- Roger Gillioz, Swiss TV director

== Official sections ==
The following films were screened in these sections:

=== Main competition ===
==== Feature films ====
Main Program / Feature Films In Competition
Original Title	English Title	Director(s)	Production Country
Ady Kiraly Katonat!	The Princess	Pal Erdöss	Hungary
Alexandre		Jean-Francois Amiguet	Switzerland
Come Dire...		Gianluca Fumagalli	Italia
Ferestadeh	The Mission	Parviz Sayyad	Iran, USA
Grenzenlos		Josef Rödl	Germany
Hamsin		Daniel Wachsman	Israel
Joe's Bed-Stuy Barbershop: We Cut Heads		Spike Lee	USA
Kazoku Gēmu	The Family Game	Yoshimitsu Morita	Japan
L'Allegement	The Unburdening	Marcel Schüpbach	Switzerland
La Java Des Ombres		Roman Goupil	France
Paesaggio Con Figure	Landscape with Figures	Silvio Soldini	Italia
Planeta Krawiec	Tailor Planet	Jerzy Domaradzki	Poland
Rodnik		Arkadi Sirenko	Russia
Sargento Getulio	Sergeant Getulio	Hermano Penna	Brazil
System Ohne Schatten	Closed Circuit	Rudolf Thome	Germany

==== Television movies ====
Main Program / TV-Movies In Competition
Original Title	English Title	Director(s)	Production Country
A Voyage Round My Father		Alvin Rakoff	Great Britain
Domino		Thomas Brasch	Germany
Harrys'Game	Harry's Game	Lawrence Gordon Clark	Great Britain
Il Passo Falso	The False Step	Paolo Poeti	Italia
Ivanhoe		Douglas Camfield	USA
Kentucky Woman		Walter Doniger	USA
L'Isola	The Island	Pino Passalacqua	Italia
La Marseillaise		Michel Berny	France
La Metamorphose	La Metamorphosis	Jean-Daniel Verhaeghe	France
Life Of The Party: The Story Of Beatrice		Lamont Johnson	USA
Merette	Mette	Jean-Jacques Lagrange	Switzerland
Miss Lonelyhearts		Michael Dinner	USA
Non Recuperables	Non -Recovery	Frank Apprederis	France
Oldsmobile		Kjell Ake Andersson, Kjell Sundvall	Sudan
That Dangerous Age		A. Proshkin	Russia
The Accident		Donald Brittain	Canada
The Shadow Riders		Andrew V. Mc Laglen	USA
To The Lighthouse		Colin Gregg	Great Britain

=== Out of competition (Fuori Concorso) ===
Main Program / Feature Films Out of Competition
Original Title	English Title	Director(s)	Production Country
Ana	Cave	Margarida Cordeiro, Antonio Réis	Portugal
Breathless		Jim McBride	USA
Carmen		Carlos Saura	Spain
Colpire Al Cuore	Heart	Gianni Amelio	Italia
Dolina Issy		Tadeusz Konwicki	Poland
El Sur	The South	Víctor Erice	Spain
L'Equateur	Ecuador	Serge Gainsbourg	France
L'Homme Blesse	The Man Hurts	Patrice Chéreau	France
Merry Christmas Mr Lawrence		Nagisa Oshima	Japan
Narayama Bushi Ko	Heijoyama Setsuko	Shohei Imamura	Japan
Pauline A La Plage	Pauline at the Beach	Éric Rohmer	France
Remembrance		Colin Gregg	Great Britain
Sans Soleil	Sunless	Chris Marker	France
Tiempo De Revancha	Revenge Time	Adolfo Aristarain	Argentina
Toute Une Nuit	Overnight	Chantal Akerman	Belgium
Visszaesok	Retrospective	Zsolt Kézdi-Kovacs	Hungary
Vivement Dimanche	Strongly Sunday	François Truffaut	France

=== Special sections ===
==== Brazilian National Week ====
Brazilian National Week
Original Title	English Title	Director(s)	Year	Production Country
A Queda	A Remain	Rui Guerra, Nelson Xavier	1976	Brazil
Ato De Violencia	I Attach Violence	Eduardo Escorel	1980	Brazil
Eles Nåo Usam Black-Tie	They Do not Use Black Tie	Leon Hirszman	1981	Brazil
O Amuleto De Ogum	Ogum's Amulet	Nelson Pereira dos Santos	1974	Brazil
O Hemen Que Virou Suco	The Man Who Became Juice	Joåo Batista de Andrade	1980	Brazil
Tudo Bem	All Good	Arnaldo Jabor	1977	Brazil

==== Carte Blanche to Alain Tanner ====
Carte Blanche To Alain Tanner
Original title	English title	Director(s)	Year	Production country
Dyn Amo	Dyn I Love	Stephen Dwoskin	1972	Great Britain
Every Day Except Christmas		Lindsay Anderson	1957	Great Britain
Meg Ker A Nep	And Ker the Nep	Miklos Jancso	1972	Hungary
Pickpocket		Robert Bresson	1959	France
Tokyo Monogatari	Tokyo Story	Yasujiro Ozu	1953	Japan
Two-Lane Blacktop		Monte Hellman	1971	USA

==== Youth and cinema ====
Youth and Cinema (Cinema E Gioventù)
Original title	English title	Director(s)	Year	Production country
Cammina Cammina	Walk Walks	Ermanno Olmi		Italia
Ivonne E Daniela	Ivonne and Daniela	Brenno Martignoni		Switzerland
Una Città In Cinema	A City in Cinema	Andrea Canetta, Nicola Gianni		Italia

==== Out of program & Special program ====
Out of Program
Original title	English title	Director(s)	Year	Production country
Prime Bande	Band Bonus	Paolo Gobetti		Italia
Siamo Donne, 5. Episodio Anna Magnani	We are Women, 5. Anna Magnani Episode	Luchino Visconti	1953	Italia
Tristana		Luis Buñuel	1970	France, Italia
Special Program
Das Luftschiff	The Airship	Rainer Simon Simon		Germany
Femmes Femmes	Women	Paul Vecchiali	1974	France
Tenkosei	Tenkosi	Nobuhiko Obayaski		Japan

==== Retrospective - Mikio Naruse ====
Retrospective Mikio Naruse (1905-1969)
Original title	English title	Director(s)	Year	Production country
Ani Imôto		Mikio Naruse	1953	Japan
Bangiki	Bangiko	Mikio Naruse	1954	Japan
Hataraku Ikka	Working Family	Mikio Naruse	1939	Japan
Hôrôki	Horôki	Mikio Naruse	1962	Japan
Inazuma	Lightning	Mikio Naruse	1952	Japan
Iwashigumo	Rugby	Mikio Naruse	1958	Japan
Kagiri Naki Nodô		Mikio Naruse	1934	Japan
Kimi To Wakarete	Separate from you	Mikio Naruse	1933	Japan
Koshiben Ganbare	Do your Best, Waist Valve	Mikio Naruse	1931	Japan
Meshi		Mikio Naruse	1951	Japan
Midareru	It Gets Confused	Mikio Naruse	1964	Japan
Nigareru	It's Painful	Mikio Naruse	1956	Japan
Okâsan	Reasonable	Mikio Naruse	1952	Japan
Onna Ga Kaidan O Agaru Toki	When a Woman Goes Up the Stairs	Mikio Naruse	1960	Japan
Otome-Gokoro Sannin Shimai	Maiden - Shin Maternity Hospital Sisters	Mikio Naruse	1935	Japan
Tsuba Yo Bara No Yo Ni	The Roses, the Brim	Mikio Naruse	1935	Japan
Tsuruhachi Tsurujiro		Mikio Naruse	1938	Japan
Ugikomo	You Don't Worry	Mikio Naruse	1955	Japan
Yama No Oto	Mountain Otoko	Mikio Naruse	1954	Japan
Yogoto No Yume	Nighttime Dreams	Mikio Naruse	1935	Japan

== Parallel sections ==
The following films were screened in these sections:

=== Film critics week ===
FIPRESCI - International Federation of Film Critics Week
Original title	English title	Director(s)	Year	Production country
Balamos		Stvros Tornes		Greece
Der Rechte Weg	The Right Path	Peter Fischli, David Weiss		Switzerland
In The King Of Prussia		Emile de Antonio		USA
Peppermint Frieden		Marianne S.W. Rosenbaum		Germany
Szerencses Daniel	Lucky Daniel	Pal Sandor		Hungary
Un Bruit Qui Court	A Short Noise	Daniel Laloux, Jean-Pierre Sentier		France

=== Swiss information ===
Swiss Information - Feature Films
Original title	English title	Director(s)	Production country
Dans La Ville Blanche	In the White City	Alain Tanner	Switzerland
Das Ganze Leben	The Whole Life	Bruno Moll	Switzerland
Hecate		Daniel Schmid	Switzerland
L'Argent	Money	Robert Bresson	Switzerland
La Mort De Mario Ricci		Claude Goretta	Switzerland
Max Haufler: Der Stumme	MAX HAUFLER: There Mute	Richard Dindo	Switzerland
Melzer		Heinz Bütler	Switzerland
Scissere	To Split	Peter Mettler	Canada, Switzerland
Transatlantique	Transatlantic	Hans-Ulrich Schlumpf	Switzerland
Swiss Information - Short And Medium-Length Films
Killer Aus Florida	Killer from Florida	Klaus Schaffhauser	Switzerland
Les Ailes Du Papillon	The Butterfly Wings	Michel Rodde	Switzerland
Swiss Information - Short And Medium-Length Films - Cinema Function Geneva
Blue Lester		Dominique Comtat Comtat	Switzerland
Gift		Catherine Iselin	Switzerland
Jalang Jalang Malagnou		Michel Buhler	Switzerland
La Nuit Du Fuseki	Fuseki Night	Leo Kaneman	Switzerland
Lancelot Du Lac, Phoenix, A' Dam	Lancelot Du Lac, Phoenix, a 'Dam	Alain Mugnier	Switzerland
Lati Et Gabor	Broad and Gabor	Tina Meirelles	Switzerland
Le Miracle Du Hurlement	The Miracle of the Howling	Pierre Maillard	Switzerland
Legal Crime		Cédric Herbez	Switzerland
Remake		Jean-Louis Gauthey	Switzerland

== Official awards ==
=== International Jury ===
- Golden Leopard: The Princess directed by Pal Erdöss
- Bronze Leopard: The Mission directed by Parviz Sayyad, JOE’S BED-STUY BARBERSHOP: WE CUT HEADS by Spike Lee, SARGENTO GETULIO by Hermano Penna
- Special Mention, Official Jury: THE FAMILY GAME by Yusako Matsuda, GRENZENLOS to Siegfried Zimmerschied, L’ALLEGEMENT to Hugues Ryffel
