= Hans Trommer =

Swiss film director (1904–1989)

- Born: 18 December 1904; Zurich, Switzerland
- Died: 28 February 1989 (aged 84); Orselina, Switzerland
- Occupations: Film director; screenwriter; commercial artist
- Spouse: Maria Theresia Inderbitzin (m. 1940)
- Parents: Johannes Trommer (father); Marie Luise Bertschi (mother)

Hans Trommer (December 18, 1904 – February 28 1989) was a Swiss film director and screenwriter. He wrote the screenplay of Romeo und Julia auf dem Dorfe (1941) and co-directed the film with Valérien Schmidely. From 1943 until 1968, he made more than ten short documentary films, winning, multiple international awards.

== Biography ==
Hans Trommer was born on December 18, 1904 in Zurich. He was the son of Johannes Trommer, then owner of the Seefeld riding school, and Marie Luise Bertschi. In 1940 he married Maria Theresia Inderbitzin, the owner of a fur shop. Originally from Riedisheim in Alsace, he became a citizen of Zurich in 1943.

In Zurich, Trommer went to school and took violin lessons at the Zurich Conservatory. He worked on German silent films in Berlin before becoming an assistant on Emil Harder's Die Entstehung der Eidgenossenschaft (1924). He was employed at his father's riding school in Zurich, which went bankrupt in 1928. After, he worked as a commercial artist and as a director of experimental short films.

Trommer wrote the screenplay of Romeo und Julia auf dem Dorfe (1941) and co-directed the film with Valérien Schmidely. From 1943 to 1968, he made roughly a dozen short documentary films, some of which won international awards. Other feature film projects of his own, among them Martin Salander, remained unfinished. He died on 28 February 1989 in Orselina.

== Bibliography ==
- H. Dumont, "Entretien avec Hans Trommer", in Travelling, 48, 1976, 5–21, 82–84
