= Emil Harder =

Swiss film producer (1883 – after 1925)

- Born: 4 August 1883; Eschenz, Switzerland
- Occupations: Baker; film producer
- Spouse: Marie Johanna Oberholzer
- Parents: Joseph Harder (father); Elisabeth Knecht (mother)

Emil Harder (born 4 August 1883; last mentioned 26 November 1925) was a Swiss baker who emigrated to the United States and founded Sunshine Film Inc. From 1923 the company raised money among the Swiss in America for a "national film", Die Entstehung der Eidgenossenschaft, which premiered in Zurich in 1924 and was a financial fiasco.

== Biography ==
Emil Harder was born on 4 August 1883 in Eschenz, the son of Joseph Harder and Elisabeth (née Knecht). He married Marie Johanna Oberholzer, the daughter of Josepha Oberholzer.

Harder first worked as a baker in Steinach before moving to Flawil in 1908 and to the United States in 1912, where he belatedly obtained a commercial education. In 1922–1923 he founded Sunshine Film Inc., which from March 1923 raised money among the Swiss living in America for a "national film" entitled Die Entstehung der Eidgenossenschaft (The Formation of the Confederation). The film premiered on 13 September 1924 in the Tonhalle Zürich and was a financial fiasco. This was one reason why, until the end of the silent film era, further large film ventures in Switzerland had no chance of being financed. Hans Trommer worked as an assistant on Harder's film. Harder was last mentioned on 26 November 1925 in New York.

== Bibliography ==
- H. Dumont, Geschichte des Schweizer Films, 1987
