= Valérien Schmidely =

Swiss film director (1909–1994)

- Born: 1 June 1909; St. Petersburg, Russian Empire
- Died: 10 December 1994 (aged 85); Zurich, Switzerland
- Occupations: Cinematographer; film director
- Spouses: Erika Anna Probst (m. 1941) Eva Weichert (m. 1977)
- Parents: Nicolas Emiliewitsch Schmidely (father); Anna Fedorowna Andrejew (mother)

Valérien Schmidely (also spelled Valérian; 1 June 1909 – 10 December 1994) was a Swiss cameraman and film director. He trained as a cameraman in Leningrad and was a camera assistant to Alexander Dovzhenko and others before returning to Switzerland in 1931. From 1938 to 1955 he was a cameraman and director at Pro Film in Zurich, and he co-directed the feature films My Dream (1939) and Romeo und Julia auf dem Dorfe (1941).

== Biography ==
Valérien Schmidely was born on 1 June 1909 (Note: Sources disagree: the HDS gives 1 June 1909 as his date of birth, while his GND authority record gives 14 September 1909 and lists 1 June 1909 as a differing date.) in St. Petersburg, the son of Nicolas Emiliewitsch Schmidely, an estate manager, and Anna Fedorowna (née Andrejew), a telephonist. He was the grandson of Louis Emile Schmidely, a confectioner from the canton of Vaud who had emigrated to Russia. In 1941 he married Erika Anna Probst, and in 1977 Eva Weichert.

Schmidely attended a school for cameramen in Leningrad. In 1927 he was an extra in Sergei Eisenstein's October, and in 1930–1931 he was a camera assistant to Alexander Dovzhenko and to Grigori Kozintsev and Leonid Trauberg. In 1931 he returned to Switzerland by way of Paris.

From 1931 to 1934 Schmidely was a cameraman with the Filmdienst cooperative (Genossenschaft Filmdienst), and from 1935 to 1938 technical director of Julius Pinschewer's animated film studios (Trickfilm-Ateliers), both in Bern. From 1938 to 1955 he worked as a cameraman and director for Conrad Arthur Schläpfer's Pro Film in Zurich, and from 1955 to 1972 he had his own company for advertising films and reportages in Zurich and Bern. He co-directed the feature films My Dream (1939) and Romeo und Julia auf dem Dorfe (1941). He made the latter with Hans Trommer, who wrote its screenplay. Schmidely died on 10 December 1994 in Zurich.

== Bibliography ==
- H. Dumont, "Entretien avec Valérien Schmidely", in Travelling, 48, 1976, 23–35
