= Richard De Medeiros =

Beninese film director

- Born: 1937; Ouidah
- Died: 2017 (aged 79–80); Nanterre
- Occupation: film director

Richard De Medeiros (1937–2017) was a Beninese film director.

== Biography ==
Richard De Medeiros was born in 1937 in Ouidah, died in 2017 in Nanterre and studied literature in Cotonou and Paris. He later taught literature at the National University of Benin in Cotonou, specializing in surrealism.

De Medeiros made two documentaries and a short feature film before his first feature film. The King died in exile was made while he was teaching at the Institut de Journalisme in Algiers. It looked at Béhanzin, the last king of Dahomey, exiled by the French colonial powers to Martinique. His short film Teke, Hymne au Borgou reappropriated ethnographic codes of filmmaking, blending them with elements of oral tradition and griot narrative style. The Newcomer (1976) was Benin's second feature film. It focussed on the clash between Senou, a corrupt civil servant, and Ahouenou, a newcomer who wants to clean things up. After Senou resorts to witchcraft and Agouenou suffers an accident, Agouenou tries to gain acceptance by undergoing magical initiation.

De Medeiros was an influence on younger Beninese filmmakers like François Sourou Okioh. He created a film club, Association du 7e art, and a cultural review, Perspectives 7. In the early 1980s he was interviewed by Pierre Haffner, participating in the debates among African filmmakers about the extent to which Jean Rouch's cinematic practice escaped its colonial context.

In 1980 he was filmed as a subject for Gérard Courant's Cinématon.

== Films ==
- Le Roi est mort en exil (The King died in exile). Short documentary, 1970.
- Teke, hymne au Borgou (Teke, hymn to the Borgou). Short documentary, 1972.
- Silence et feu de brousse (Silence and bushfire). Short fiction film, 1972
- Le nouveau venu (The newcomer). Feature-length fiction film, 1976
