= Hadj Rahim =

Algerian film director and actor (1934–2017)

- Born: 1934; Algeria
- Died: January 13, 2017; Algiers, Algeria
- Citizenship: Algerian
- Occupations: Film director, actor
- Notable work: Serkadji (1982)

Hadj Rahim (1934 – 13 January 2017) was an Algerian film director and actor, active during the 1970s and 1980s. He is known for the film Serkadji (1982) and for several documentaries and productions for Télévision Algérienne. He died on 13 January 2017 in Algiers.

== Career ==
Hadj Rahim worked as both a director and actor, alternating between fiction and documentary. He directed films and television works, some of which were screened at international festivals (including one presented at Locarno). He is sometimes described as a "pioneer of hidden camera" formats in Algeria.

== Filmography ==
=== Films ===
Year	Title	Notes / Role	Reference
1971	La mission	Credited on IMDb	
1976	3 de cœur	Credited on IMDb	
1980	One-Way Ticket (Un aller simple)	Documentary; screened at the Locarno Film Festival (1981); in Arabic/French	
1982	Serkadji	Fictional feature about the Barberousse (Serkadji) prison; notable work	

== Recognition and Critical reception ==
Several sources and academic works have noted the historical and cultural significance of Rahim's films, particularly Serkadji, within post-independence Algerian cinema and the collective memory of colonial prisons.

- The film Serkadji (1982) was recognized in international auteur cinema circuits, such as during a retrospective on Algerian cinema at the Centre Pompidou (2003), which emphasized its depiction of the Barberousse/Serkadji prison and the execution of FLN fighters.
- The academic article Colonial Prisons in Algeria during the Liberation Revolution (1954–1962) describes Serkadji as one of the most emblematic sites of torture and detention, adding a documentary depth to the film's historical significance.
- Obituaries and tributes often highlighted Rahim's creativity, cultural contribution, and social insight, noting his enduring impact on Algerian television and film.

== Death ==
Hadj Rahim died on 13 January 2017 in Algiers, at the age of 83.

== See also ==
- Cinema of Algeria
- Barberousse Prison
