= Nicos Panayotopoulos =

Greek journalist, screenwriter and novelist

Nicos Panayotopoulos (born 1963) is a Greek journalist, screenwriter and novelist. He was born in Athens, and studied engineering at university. He started his career as an arts journalist for newspapers, magazines and TV, but switched to writing novels and screenplays in the early 1990s. He has written screenplays for short films, TV series and feature films. He won the best screenplay award for Truants at the 1996 Thessaloniki Film Festival. Another award-winning screenplay was False Alarm, written in 2000 and produced in 2006. He also teaches screenwriting in film schools and writing workshops.

As a writer of fiction, he has published a short story collection titled The Guilt of Materials (1997). This won the Maria Ralli Award for new writers. He has also written four novels:

- Ziggy from Marfan – The Diary of an Alien (1998)
- The Gene of Doubt (1999)
- Icon (2003), shortlisted for the National Novel Award
- The Children of Cain (2011)

His work has been translated into Italian, French, German, Slovenian, Serbian, Chinese and Portuguese.
