= The Idlers of the Fertile Valley =

1978 Greek film by Nikos Panayotopoulos

I tembelides tis eforis kiladas
- Directed by: Nikos Panayotopoulos
- Starring: Vasilis Diamantopoulos; Olga Karlatos; Dimitris Poulikakos; Nikitas Tsakiroglou; Giorgos Dialegmenos
- Release date: October 4, 1978
- Running time: 118 minutes
- Country: Greece

The Idlers of the Fertile Valley (Greek: Οι Τεμπέληδες της εύφορης κοιλάδας; I tembelides tis eforis kiladas) is a Greek film directed by Nikos Panayotopoulos. It won the Golden Leopard at the 1978 Locarno International Film Festival.

== Cast ==
- Vasilis Diamantopoulos as father
- Olga Karlatos
- Dimitris Poulikakos
- Nikitas Tsakiroglou
- Giorgos Dialegmenos

== Reception ==
- It won the Golden Leopard at the 1978 Locarno International Film Festival.
- Two awards for Best Editing and Best Production Design in Thessaloniki Film Festival
