= Baara =

- Directed by: Souleymane Cissé
- Written by: Souleymane Cissé
- Produced by: Souleymane Cissé
- Starring: Balla Moussa Keita, Baba Niare, Bubukar Keita
- Cinematography: Étienne Carton de Grammont, Abdoulaye Sidibé
- Edited by: Andrée Davanture
- Music by: Lamine Konté
- Release date: 1978
- Running time: 93 minutes
- Country: Mali

Baara (French: Le Travail), released internationally as Work, is a 1978 film directed by Souleymane Cissé. It was the first ever feature film to be produced in Mali. The film has been screened at multiple international film festivals, and it has won a number of awards.

== Synopsis ==
A young Malian peasant works as a baara, that is to say a baggage carrier in Bamako. He becomes acquainted with a young, progressive engineer who introduces him to a job at a factory.

== Cast ==
- Ismaïla Saar
- Niare Baba
- Keita Boubacar
- Balla Moussa Keita
- Oumou Diarra

== Awards and accolades ==
- Étalon de Yennenga (FESPACO, Ouagadougou)
- Golden Montgolfiere (Three Continents Festival, Nantes)
- Jury Prize (Locarno Festival of Film, Locarno)
