= Tűzoltó utca 25. =

- Directed by: István Szabó
- Release date: 1973
- Country: Hungary

Tűzoltó utca 25. is a 1973 Hungarian film directed by István Szabó. It won the Golden Leopard at the 1974 Locarno International Film Festival

== Reception ==
It won the Golden Leopard at the 1974 Locarno International Film Festival.
