= Dominique Benicheti =

French film director and producer

Dominique Benichetti
- Born: Dominique Benicheti; 16 May 1943; Paris, France
- Died: 29 July 2011 (aged 68); Paris, France
- Occupations: Film Director, Screenwriter, Film Producer, Animator, Technician, Stereographer,

Dominique Benichetti (16 May 1943 - 29 July 2011) was a French film director and producer known for documentaries, pioneering work on 3D film, animation, and special projects.

== Early life ==
Dominique was born in Paris in 1943. He studied at the École nationale supérieure des arts appliqués et des métiers d'art (ENSAAMA), the École nationale supérieure des beaux-arts (ENSBA), and the Institut des hautes études cinématographiques (IDHEC) in Animation.

== Career ==
Over the course of his professional life, Benichetti directed and produced more than 30 films. He worked on documentaries, educational, scientific, institutional, and corporate films. He was active in animation, and was a creative and technical consultant on many 3D and large format (70mm) film projects. He advised on 3D technology for The Futuroscope Park in Poitiers, France.

Benichetti was also active in the United States, teaching documentary filmmaking at Harvard University, as well as working at the Jefferson Laboratories of Experimental Physics, and the Harvard Smithsonian Center for Astrophysics. In Hollywood, he worked at Gower Studios as a consultant stereographer.

== Cousin Jules ==
Benichetti's documentary "Le Cousin Jules" was produced over the course of 5 years (from April 1968 to March 1973). The film shows the everyday life of Benichetti's cousin Jules Guiteaux and his wife Félicie as they work on their farm in the French countryside. The film (unseen for several decades) was considered a masterpiece when released, showing at a number of festivals and winning awards. It was noted for the Cinemascope work of cinematographer Pierre-William Glen and its stereophonic sound. This long métrage obtained the Jury Prize at the Locarno Festival in 1973.

Following years of neglect, where the original negative and copies had begun to disintegrate, Benicheti had begun restoring the film before his sudden death in 2011. Devoted supporters finished the work, resulting in a pristine 2K Digital Cinema Package (DCP) that awed audiences at its 2012 NYFF screening. Le Cousin Jules made its American debut at the 50th New York Film Festival (NYFF) in 2012. The "rediscovered masterpiece" was celebrated at NYFF for its exquisite visual qualities and its immersive look at a vanishing way of life.

Since 2012, the restored digital version of "Le Cousin Jules" has been shown in film festivals around the world.

== Successful films ==
L’Odyssée magique / The Magical Odyssey: is a 70mm/ 8 film completed in March 2009 for Giscard d'Estaing's Vulcania Edutainement Park in Auvergne, Benichetti was chosen over many including the Earth photographer Yan-Arthus Bertrand - to realize this tale documentary of a hymn to Nature which was filmed in 70mm/8perfs in Iceland, Colorado, French Guiana, Arizona, California, Vietnam and France. In this production, he directed as well the part of Titania, a charming cartoon fairy character, made with computer graphics animation, and blended in the live action of the movie.

La Revole : a 20-minute 3-D musical comedy, is the high point of the Beaujolais Wine Museum, seen by approximately 150,000 visitors a year. He wrote the screenplay and the lyrics, drew the storyboard, and directed the movie while also being responsible for the stereography.

Le Prix de la Liberté / The Price of Freedom : a 20 mm film in 35 mm and 360 degrees, created for the Museum in Arromanches to celebrate the 50th anniversary of the Normandy Landings in 1944. He wrote and directed the film, blending in a circular continuum the shots filmed by war correspondents with staged sequences of contemporary Normandy. It has been viewed by over 2 million spectators, and is still running in the circular theater specially built for the film, overlooking the bay of Arromanches.

== Family name ==
Since 2005, Benicheti is also written Benichetti with "tt".

== See also ==
- 63rd Berlin International Film Festival
- Vulcania
