= Les petites fugues =

1979 film

- Directed by: Yves Yersin
- Written by: Yves Yersin; Claude Muret
- Produced by: Robert Boner
- Starring: Michel Robin
- Cinematography: Robert Alazraki
- Edited by: Yves Yersin
- Music by: Léon Francioli; Guillermo Villegas
- Production company: Filmkollektiv Zürich AG
- Release date: February 1979
- Running time: 145 minutes
- Country: Switzerland
- Language: French

Les petites fugues is a 1979 Swiss film directed by Yves Yersin and written by Yersin and Claude Muret. Starring Michel Robin, it follows an ageing farmhand whose purchase of a moped opens up a new sense of freedom. The film premiered in February 1979, competed in the Un Certain Regard section at the 1979 Cannes Film Festival, and earned Robin the International Jury Prize at the 1979 Locarno Film Festival.

== Synopsis ==
After reaching retirement age, Pipe, a farmhand who has spent 30 years working for the Duperrex family, buys a moped with his pension and begins exploring the surrounding countryside. After a drunken outing leads to a minor accident and the loss of his licence, he turns to photography and begins looking at the world around him through the lens of a Polaroid camera.

== Cast ==
The cast includes:

- Michel Robin as Pipe
- Fabienne Barraud as Josiane
- Fred Personne as Duperrex
- Dore De Rosa as Luigi
- Mista Préchac as Rose Duperrex
- Laurent Sandoz as Alain
- Nicole Vautier as Marianne

== Reception ==
=== Awards and nominations ===
At the 1979 Locarno Film Festival, Michel Robin won the International Jury Prize for his performance as Pipe.

=== Critical response ===
In a 2024 retrospective review, Neue Zürcher Zeitung viewed the film negatively, while praising Michel Robin’s performance. Filmdienst called the film an original debut feature that depicts a process of self-liberation in a measured, poetic and cheerful manner. Filmpodium cited Reclams Filmführer, which described the film as “a quiet but very intense film” and “simultaneously an astute analysis”.

Neue Zürcher Zeitung wrote that the film drew 424,505 admissions in Switzerland in 1979, making it one of the most successful Swiss productions. Swissinfo described the film as one of the most successful Swiss films of all time.

== Festival screenings ==
The film premiered in February 1979. It competed in the Un Certain Regard section at the 1979 Cannes Film Festival. In later years, it was screened at festivals including the 50th Solothurn Film Festival in 2015, the Festival international du film francophone de Namur in 2000, Festival du film de Genève, Stars de Demain in 1997, and the Festival des premiers films in 1995.

== See also ==
- List of submissions to the 52nd Academy Awards for Best Foreign Language Film
- List of Swiss submissions for the Academy Award for Best Foreign Language Film
