= Gábor Bódy =

Hungarian film director, screenwriter, theoretic, and occasional actor

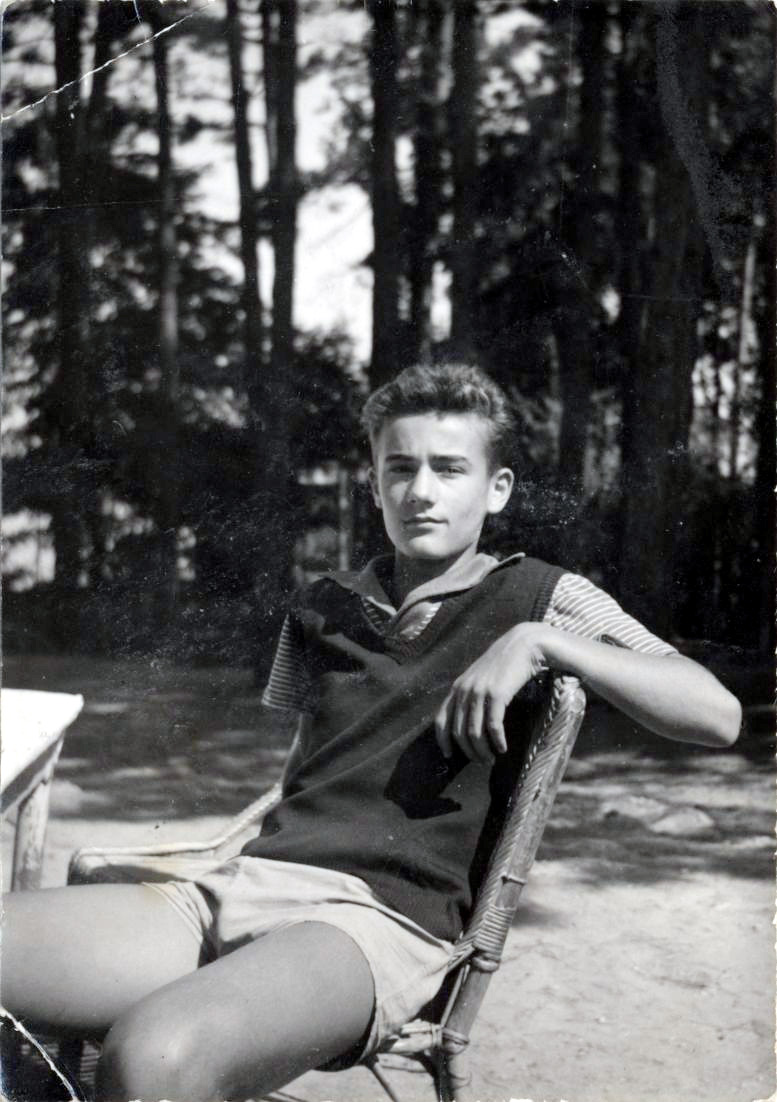
- Born: 30 August 1946; Budapest, Hungary
- Died: 24 October 1985 (aged 39); Budapest, Hungary
- Years active: 1971–1985

Gábor Bódy (30 August 1946 – 24 October 1985) was a Hungarian film director, screenwriter, theoretic, and occasional actor. A pioneer of experimental filmmaking and film language, Bódy is one of the most important figures of Hungarian cinema.

== Biography ==
Bódy was born in Budapest, in an urban middle-class family. He studied history and philosophy at Loránd Eötvös University and later filmmaking at the Academy for Theater and Film Arts. During his university days he became an influential member of the Béla Balázs Stúdió (BBS). He made his first film A Harmadik (The Third) (a documentary about students preparing an adaptation of Faust on stage) in 1971. He established various experimental and avantgarde projects at BBS including the Film Language Series in 1973 and the K/3 experimental film group in 1976, reshaping the postwar Hungarian avantgarde film's path.

In 1975 he completed his debut feature at BBS, which was also his graduation thesis film at the university. Amerikai Anzix (American Torso) won the Grand Prize for best new filmmaker at International Filmfestival Mannheim-Heidelberg and the Hungarian Film Critics prize for best first film. The film which depicts the lives of Hungarian 1848 Revolution veterans in the American Civil War features Bódy's experimentalism at the fullest. The whole film was re-edited using his own method called "light editing" in order to make it resemble a wracked silent film from the late 19th century.

His next feature Narcissus and Psyche was the largest-scale Hungarian production of its era. This epic production based on Sándor Weöres's poetic work Psyché starred Patricia Adriani, Udo Kier and György Cserhalmi and exists in three versions: an original 210-minute two-part version, a 136-minute version for foreign distribution and a 270-minute three-part television version.

In 1980 Bódy began to work on the first international video magazine INFERMENTAL and managed to publish the first of 10 issues (plus one special issue) while on a residency at DAAD Artists-in-Berlin Program in 1982. The series published featured a range of guest editors and in total included work from over 1500 artists from 36 countries and was published up to 1991.

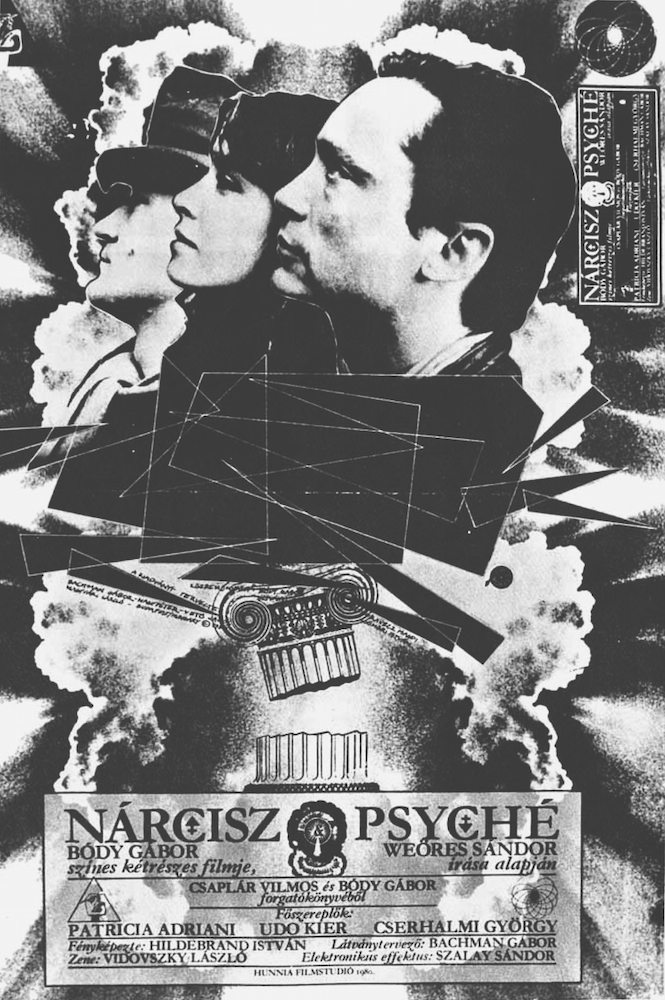
Nárcisz és Psyché - movie poster

After many frustrated projects Bódy managed to complete what was to become his final feature film Kutya éji dala (Dog's Night Song). The director of photography for "Dog's Night Song" was Johanna Heer. Bódy cast himself as the lead in this ambitious and influential feature which incorporated Super8 and video footage as well as a range of Hungarian underground punk bands (Galloping Coroners, Trabant) of the time in order to a film "deeply rooted in the fundamentals of today's reality."

In 1985 Bódy died under sketchy circumstances. A later published information (2001) hints his earlier collaboration (1973–1983) with the Hungarian Secret Police, the III/III. Authorities of the time (Hungary was then considered a 'satellite' country of the Soviet Union) stated that he had killed himself. His widow instead preferred a charge of murder against certain unidentified parties. No official investigation followed and Bódy's fate remains a mystery to this day.

== Filmography ==
=== Feature films ===
- 1975 : Amerikai Anzix / American Postcard

Hungary, 35mm scope, B&W, 104'

- 1980 : Nárcisz és Psyché / Narcissus and Psyche

Hungary, 35mm scope, colour, one part foreign version 136' two-part version 270' three-part TV version 270'

- 1983 : Kutya éji dala / The Dog's Night Song

Hungary, 35mm, colour, 147'

=== TV films ===
- 1976 : Filmiskola / Film School

Hungary, 16mm, B&W, 87'

- 1977 : Katonák / Soldiers

Hungary, TV, colour, 90min

- 1978 : Krétakör / Chalk Circle

Hungary, TV, colour, 95min

- 1981-82 : Hamlet (A fegyveres filozófus) / Hamlet (The Armed Philosopher)

Hungary, TV, colour, 173min

=== Short Films & Videos ===
- 1971 A Harmadik / The Third

Hungary, 35mm, B&W, 50'

- 1972 Fogalmazvány a féltékenységrõl / Draft on Jealousy

Hungary, 16mm, B&W, 20'

- 1972 : Ifivezetok / Youth Organisation Leaders

Hungary, 16mm, B&W 42'

- 1973 : Tradicionális Kábítószerünk / Our Traditional Drope

Hungary, 16mm, B&W, 30'

- 1972-75 : Négy bagatell / Four Bagatells

Hungary, 35mm, B&W, 28'

- 1974 : Hogyan verekedett meg Jappe és do Escobar után a világ / After Jappe and Do Escobar fought how did the world come to fight

Hungary, 16mm, B&W, 40'

- 1976 : Pszihokozmoszok / Psychocosmoses

Hungary, 35mm, B&W, 12'

- 1978 : Privát történelem / Private History (co-dir. Péter Timár)

Hungary, 35mm, B&W, 25'

- 1980 : Mozgástanulmányok 1880-1980 (Homage to Eadweard Muybridge) / Motion Studies 1880-1980 (Homage to Eadweard Muybridge)

Hungary, 35mm scope, colour, 18'

- 1982 : Conversation between East and West co-director Marcel Odenbach

Germany, video, colour, 3'

- 1982 : Die Geschwister/ Brother and Sister

GDR / Hungary, video, colour, 27'

- 1982 : Der Dämon in Berlin / The Demon In Berlin

GDR / Hungary, super8 and video, colour, 28'

- 1983 : Die Geisel / The Hostage

GDR / Hungary, video, colour, 22'

- 1983 : De Occulta Philosophia / Philo-clip

GDR / Hungary, video, colour, 3'

- 1983 : Rittersrustung / Armour

GDR, video, colour, 40'

- 1984 Vagy-vagy a Chinatownban / Either/Or In Chinatown

Canada / GDR, video, colour, 37'

- 1985 : Euronyme tanca (Mytho-clip) / Dancing Eurynome (Mytho-clip)

Hungary, video, colour, 3'

- 1985 : Waltzer (Lyric-clip) / Waltz (Lyric-clip)

GDR, video, colour, 3'

=== Miscellaneous crew ===
- 1969 : Agitátorok/Agitators dir. Dezső Magyar (35mm, 82')

Screenplay, actor

- 1976 : Aldrin dir. László Vidovszky (35mm, 14')

Camera

== Bibliography ==
- Kovács, András Bálint: Gábor Bódy: A precursor of the Digital Age.- In: Imre, Anikó (ed.): East European Cinemas. New York, London: Routledge, 2005, p. 151-164 (ISBN 0-415-97268-X)
- Bódy, Veruschka; Bódy, Gábor (ed): Axis. Auf der elektronischen Bühne Europa. Eine Asuwahl aus den 80er Jahren. [Book accompanying video tape] - Cologne: DuMont, 1986 ISBN 3-7701-1844-8 (VHS)
- Bódy, Veruschka; Bódy, Gábor (ed): Video in Kunst und Alltag. Vom kommerziellen zum kulturellen Videoklip. - Cologne: DuMont, 1986 (ISBN 3-7701-2027-2)
