= Jacqueline Veuve =

Swiss documentary filmmaker, ethnologist

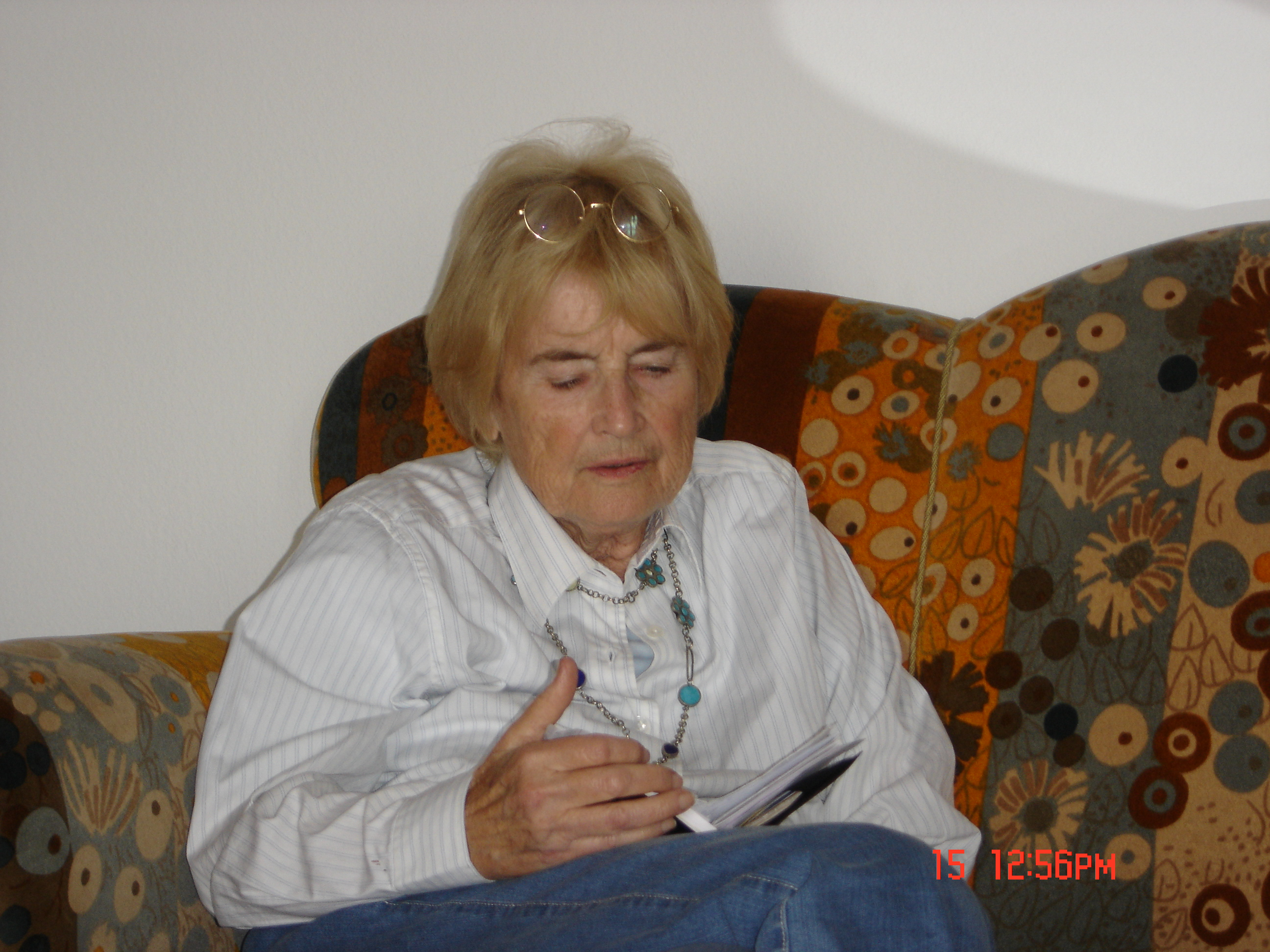
- Born: Jacqueline Reber; 29 January 1930; Payerne, Switzerland
- Died: 18 April 2013 (aged 83); Bourg-en-Lavaux, Switzerland
- Occupations: Documentary filmmaker and ethnologist
- Spouse: Léopold Veuve
- Children: Two
- Parents: Maurice Reber (father); Yvonne Reymond (mother)

Jacqueline Veuve (29 January 1930 – 18 April 2013) was a Swiss filmmaker known for "ethnographical cinema". She has been referred to as the "great lady of the Swiss documentary film." She received a Lifetime Achievement Award from the 2013 Swiss Film Prize.

== Life ==
Jacqueline Reber was born in Payerne, Switzerland, in 1930 to Maurice Reber and Yvonne Reymond.

After studying in Lausanne, she attended the School of Library and Information Science in Geneva (1952–1953) Veuve then went to Paris to work on her diploma thesis and she met the French filmmaker and ethnologist Jean Rouch in 1955 at the Museum of Man.

She made her first short film Le Panier à viande in 1966 with Swiss director Yves Yersin. In the early 1970s she spent time at the Massachusetts Institute of Technology to work with British documentary filmmaker Richard Leacock and during her time there, she made two short films about the women's movement in the United States.

According to Maire, her interest in ethnology was revealed through film.

Jacqueline Veuve had a strong sense of attitude, of everything that has to be shown or left out so that the audience can understand. Examples of this are the film series on the “wood professions”, the “Métiers du bois” such as the films “Claude Lebet, luthier” (“Claude Lebet, violin maker”, 1988), “Armand Rouiller, fabricant de luges” (“Armand Rouiller, Schlittenmacher ”, 1987) or “Marcellin Babey, tourneur sur bois” (“Marcellin Babey, Drechsler”, 1989) or the “Chronique vigneronne”(1999) on viticulture and the “Chronique paysanne en Gruyère” (1990), the farmer's chronicle. At Jacqueline Veuve, complex alpine cheese becomes a completely transparent matter. And better still: a compelling story. Her masterful gift of description allows her to go on: She stages reality so much that tension arises while making the cheese. Or when cutting shingles in Valais.

In 1974, Veuve founded her own film production company in Lausanne, Aquarius Films. Some of her films were commissioned and others were done on a freelance basis. Her first full-length documentary La Mort du grand-père ou Le Sommeil du juste (The death of the grandfather or: The sleep of the just) was shown at the Locarno Film Festival in 1978.

Her last documentary premiered in 2012. Titled Vibrato, it was about the Friborg choir of the Collège St-Michel.

Jacqueline Veuve made a total of 14 full-length films, including some feature films (Parti sans laisser d'address 1982; L'Évanouie 1992). Throughout her lifetime, she "shot more than 60 short and feature documentaries presented in festivals around the world and crowned with international awards."

== Personal life ==
Jacqueline Veuve married Léopold Veuve in 1956 and had two children.

== Select prizes ==
- 1972: Prix Cinéma et Jeunesse in Cannes for Les Lettres de Stalingrad
- 1987: Special award of the SSR at the Festival international du film Alpin
- 1989: Prix de la Mission du Patrimoine Ethnographique, 8e Bilan international du film ethnographique, Museum of Man, Paris
- 1989: Festival International Du Film Alpin, Les Diablerets
- 1998: Swiss Film Prize for Journal de Rivesaltes 1941–1942 (Best Documentary)
- 2013: Swiss Film Prize (Lifetime Achievement Award)
