= Yves Yersin =

Swiss film director (1942–2018)

- Born: 4 October 1942; Lausanne, Switzerland
- Died: 15 November 2018 (aged 76); Baulmes, Switzerland
- Occupation: Film director
- Years active: 1968-1979

Yves Yersin (4 October 1942 – 15 November 2018) was a Swiss film director. His film Les petites fugues competed in the Un Certain Regard section at the 1979 Cannes Film Festival.

== Biography ==
Yersin studied photography at the Center Vocational de Vevey from 1959 to 1961, and received a Federal Certificate of Capacity. He began advertising photography in 1962 and trained as a cameraman from 1963 to 1964.

While at the Expo 64, Yersin assisted René Crux during the Polyvision slideshow.

Yersin joined the Fondation du Groupe 5 with Alain Tanner, Jean-Louis Roy, Michel Soutter, and Jean-Jacques Lagrange in 1971.

== Filmography ==
- Swiss Made (1968)
- Quatre d'entre elles (1968)
- Die letzten Heimposamenter (1974)
- Les petites fugues (1979)
- Tableau Noir (2013)
