= László Nagy Memorial House =

Coordinates: 47.1780°N 17.2916°E

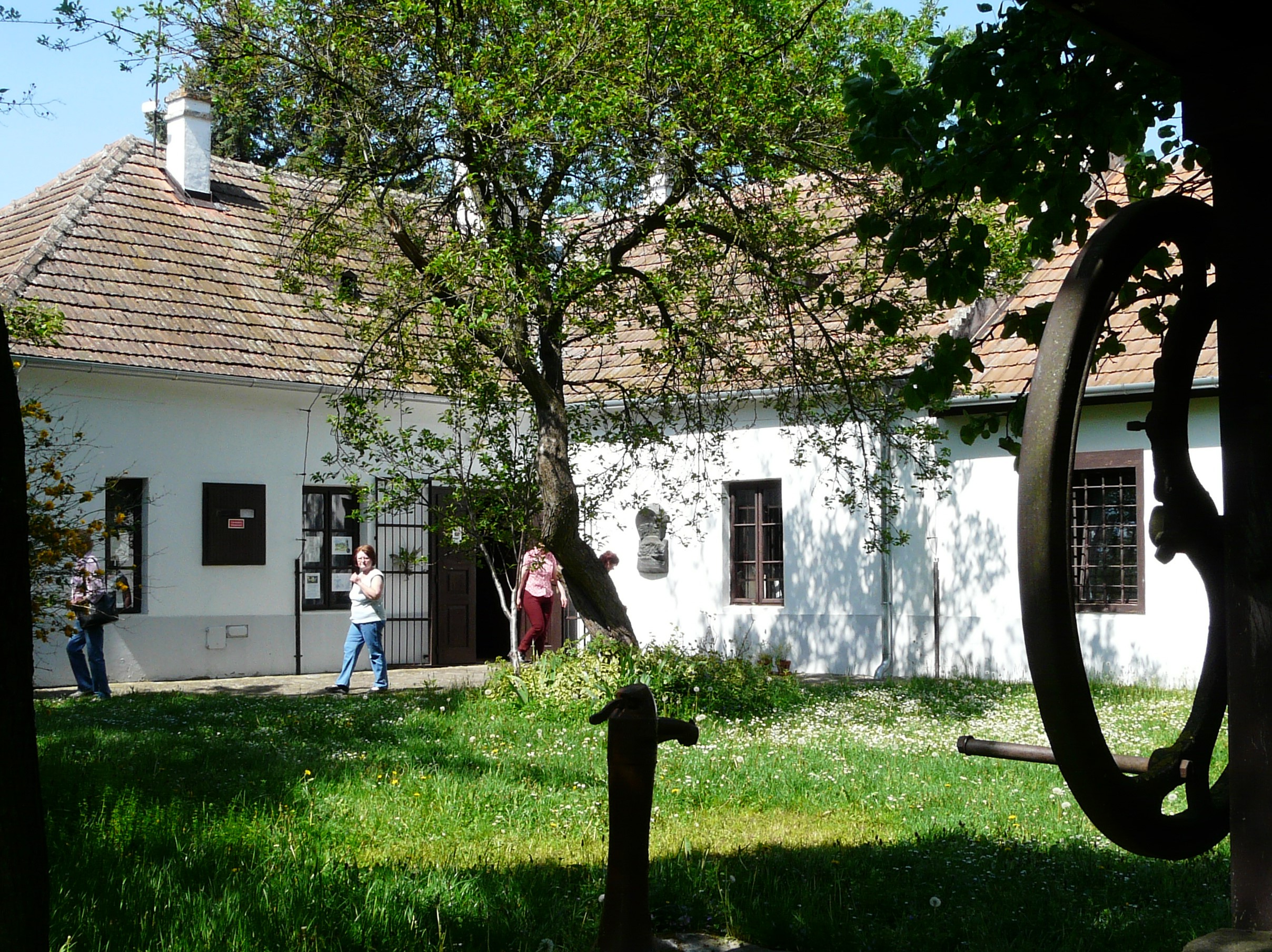
László Nagy Memorial House, Iszkáz

László Nagy Memorial House Hungarian: Nagy László Emlékház is a literary memorial site and small museum located in the house in which the poet and translator László Nagy was born. It is situated in Iszkáz, Veszprém County, Hungary and is managed by the local municipality and the Nagy László Intellectual Heritage Foundation.

== The building ==
The house lies at the very edge of the village and was built by László Nagy's father in 1908. In the 1970s funds were raised to renovate the building, which was in a state of disrepair. The building was opened to the public in 1984. On the outer wall of the house is a relief depicting László Nagy, produced by the painter János Orosz.

== Exhibition and memorial ==
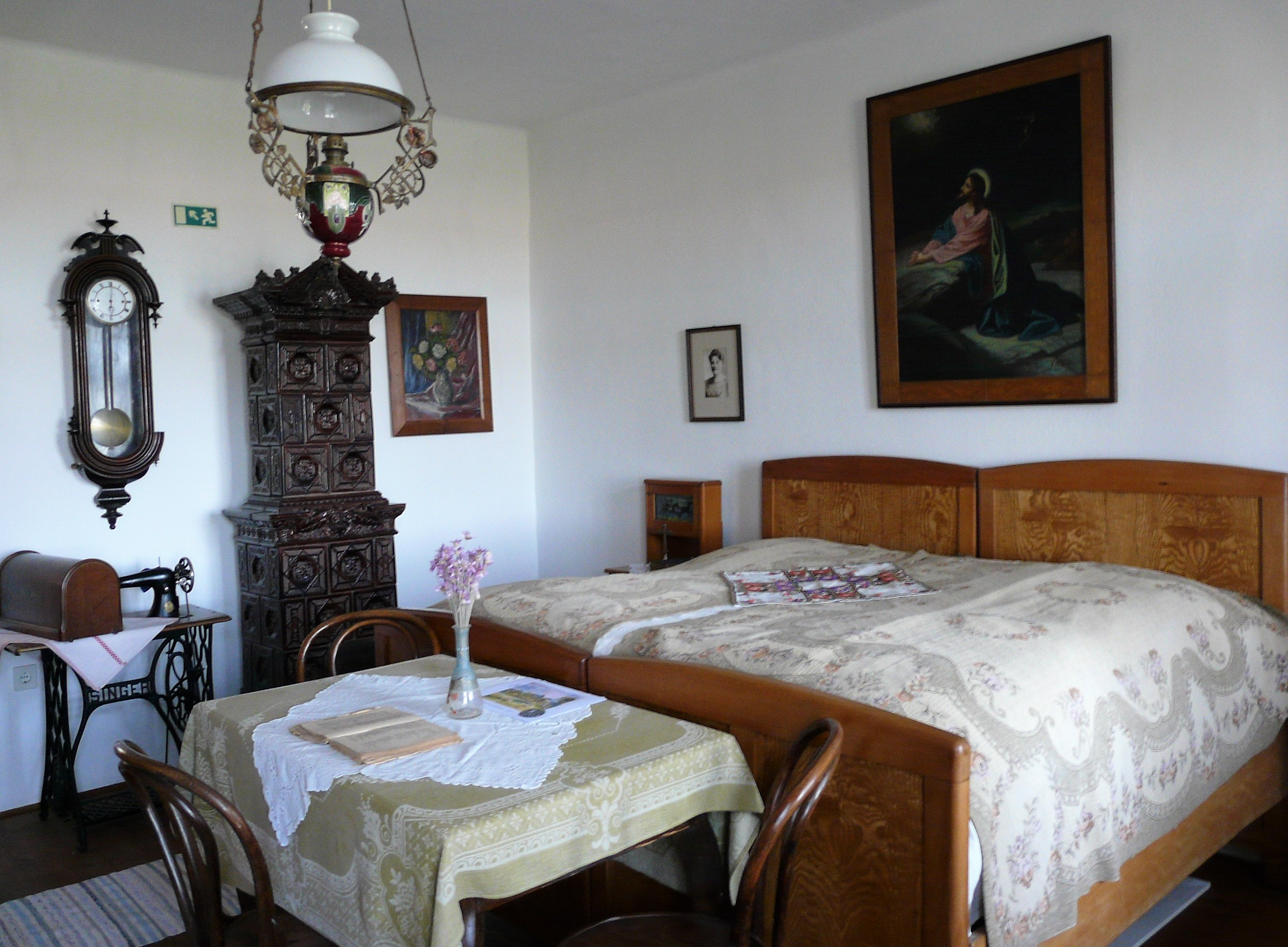
László Nagy Memorial House

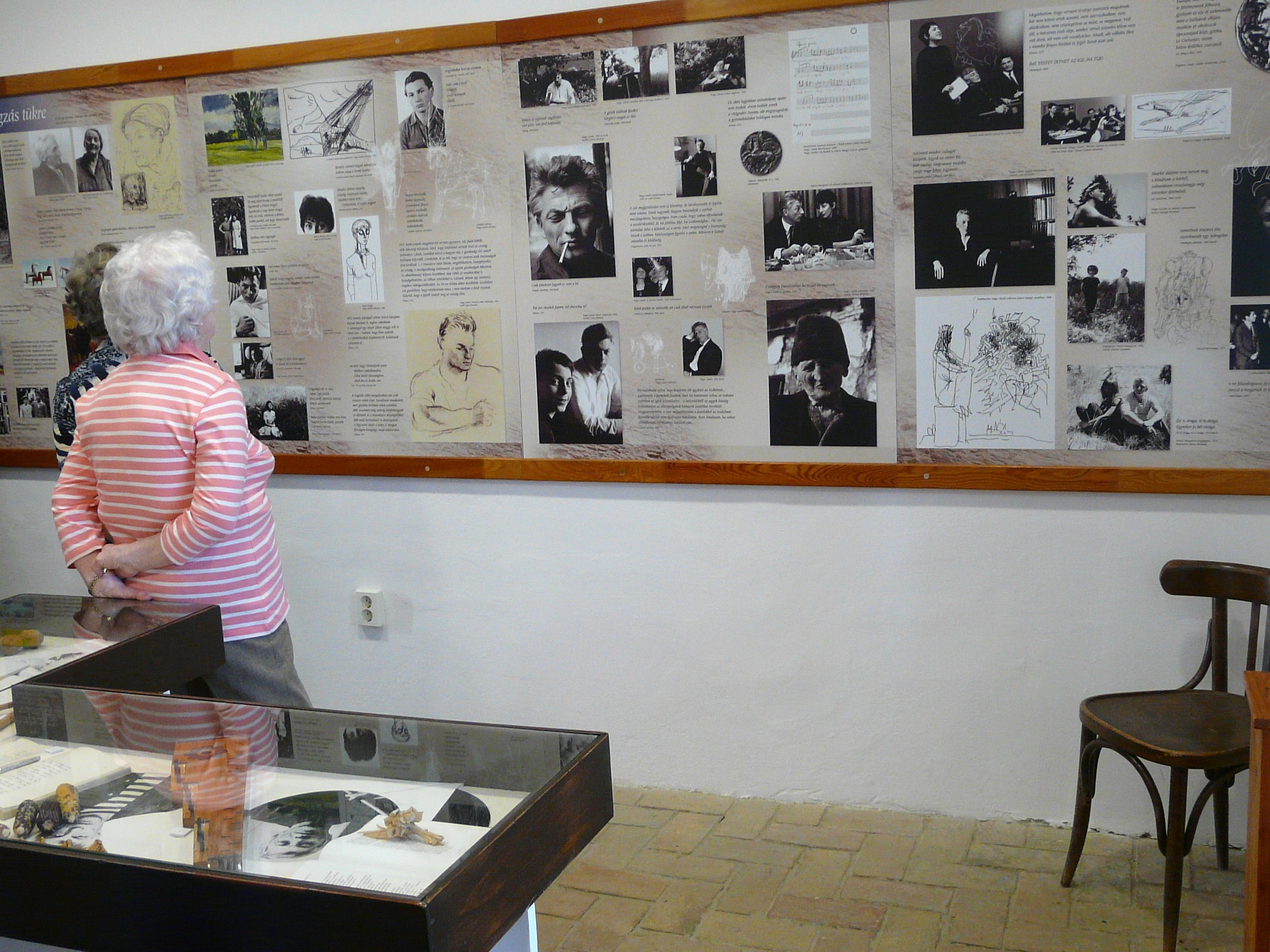
Part of the exhibition

The museum's permanent collection consists of items related to László Nagy's life and work. These items are displayed on the walls and in exhibition cases. Some quotations are also displayed to give a taste of his views on life and the particular nature of his poetry.

Part of the exhibition shows items related to his parents, including their bedroom and some old farming tools. The former shed has been transformed into a Bulgarian-style room as a reminder of the years Nagy spent in Bulgaria both studying and as a literary translator.

Since 2003 an annual memorial day has been held at the museum, which includes a literary or cultural program.

== Sources ==
- Nagy László Emlékház (Iszkáz község honlapja. Access date: 2018-06-28)
- Nagy László Emlékház (Magyar Irodalmi Emlékházak Egyesülete. Access date: 2018-06-28)
- Lőcsei Gabriella: A 90 éve született Nagy László emlékezete (Locsei.net, 2015-07-17. Access date: 2018-06-28)
