= Attila József Prize =

Annual Hungarian literary award

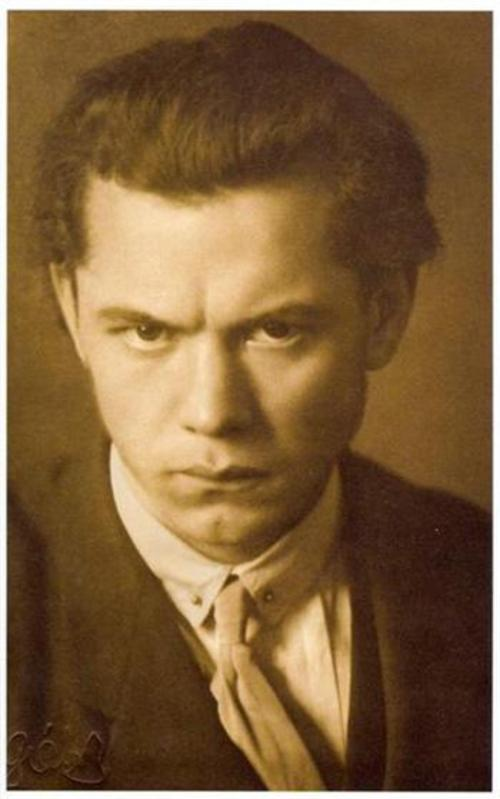
József Attila portréja

The Attila József Prize is an annually awarded Hungarian literary prize for excellence in the field of belles-lettres. It was first presented in 1950 in honour of the poet Attila József.

== Prizewinners ==
For a complete list of prizewinners see listing at the Hungarian Wikipedia

Some notable prizewinners include:

- László Németh 1951
- Géza Képes 1952
- Sándor Dallos 1953
- Lajos Áprily 1954
- Magda Szabó 1959 and 1972
- Sándor Csoóri 1954
- István Fekete 1960
- Margit Szécsi 1960
- Endre Illés (hu) 1963
- Endre Fejes 1963
- Béla Vihar 1966
- Mozes Kahana 1968
- István Ágh 1969 and 1980
- János Pilinszky 1971
- Menyhért Lakatos 1976
- Miklós Szentkuthy 1977
- Ágnes Gergely 1977 and 1987
- Anna Dániel 1983
- Zsuzsa Vathy 1986
- László Krasznahorkai 1987
- Zsuzsa Rakovszky 1987
- Menyhért Lakatos 1993
- Zsófia Balla (1996)
- Attila Bartis (2005)
- Zsófia Bán 2008
- Attila György (2011)
