= Attila György =

- Born: 15 August 1971 (age 55); Miercurea Ciuc, Romania
- Occupations: Writer, journalist, editor
- Writing career
- Period: 1995 – present

Attila György (born 15 August 1971, Miercurea Ciuc, Harghita County, Romania), is a Székely writer, journalist, and literary editor. He has received the Attila József Prize for excellence in Hungarian literature.

== Biography ==
György graduated from the Miercurea Ciuc School of Mathematics and Physics (now Márton Áron Gymnasium). Between 1991 and 1997, he was a journalist and editor for such publications as Ifi Fórum, If, Zabhegyező, and Erdélyi Napló. Since 1997, he has been editor of the cultural journal Székelyföld. In 1999, he edited the Transylvanian professional journal Könyvjelző, and the Internet portal Internetto Transsylvaniae.

His short stories, novellas and journalism appear regularly in the Romanian and Hungarian press. He is a member of the Hungarian Writers' Association and the Young Writers' Association, and is a former Intendant of the Transylvanian Hungarian Writers' League.

On 15 March 1999 in Budapest, he was awarded the Attila József Prize, recognizing excellence in contributions to Hungarian literature. It was presented by Miklós Réthelyi, Hungarian Minister of National Resources.

== Chief works ==
- Ki olyan mint a Sárkány (Who Is Like the Dragon?), short story collection; 1995, Miercurea Ciuc, Kájoni Kiadó
- A boszorkányok feltámadása (The Resurrection of the Witches), novella; 1997, Cluj-Napoca, Erdélyi Híradó
- Történetek a nyereg alól (Tales from Beneath the Saddle), short story collection; 1999, Miercurea Ciuc, Pro-Print Kiadó
- Harminchárom (Thirty-three), novel; 2002, Budapest, Magyar Könyvklub
- Harcosok Könyve (The Book of the Warriors); 2005, Arad, Irodalmi Jelen Kiadó
- Az én státusom (My Own Status), journalism; 2005, Târgu Secuiesc, Havas Kiadó
- Hajós a kikötőben (Boat in the Harbor); 2009, Šamorín, Slovakia, Méry Ratio Kiadó

== Prizes and awards ==
- Award of the Association of Hungarian Journalists in Romania
- András Bálint Memorial Prize
- Curator's Prize, Tokay Writers' Workshop 2002
- Attila József Prize, 2011
