= László Nagy (poet) =

Hungarian poet and translator

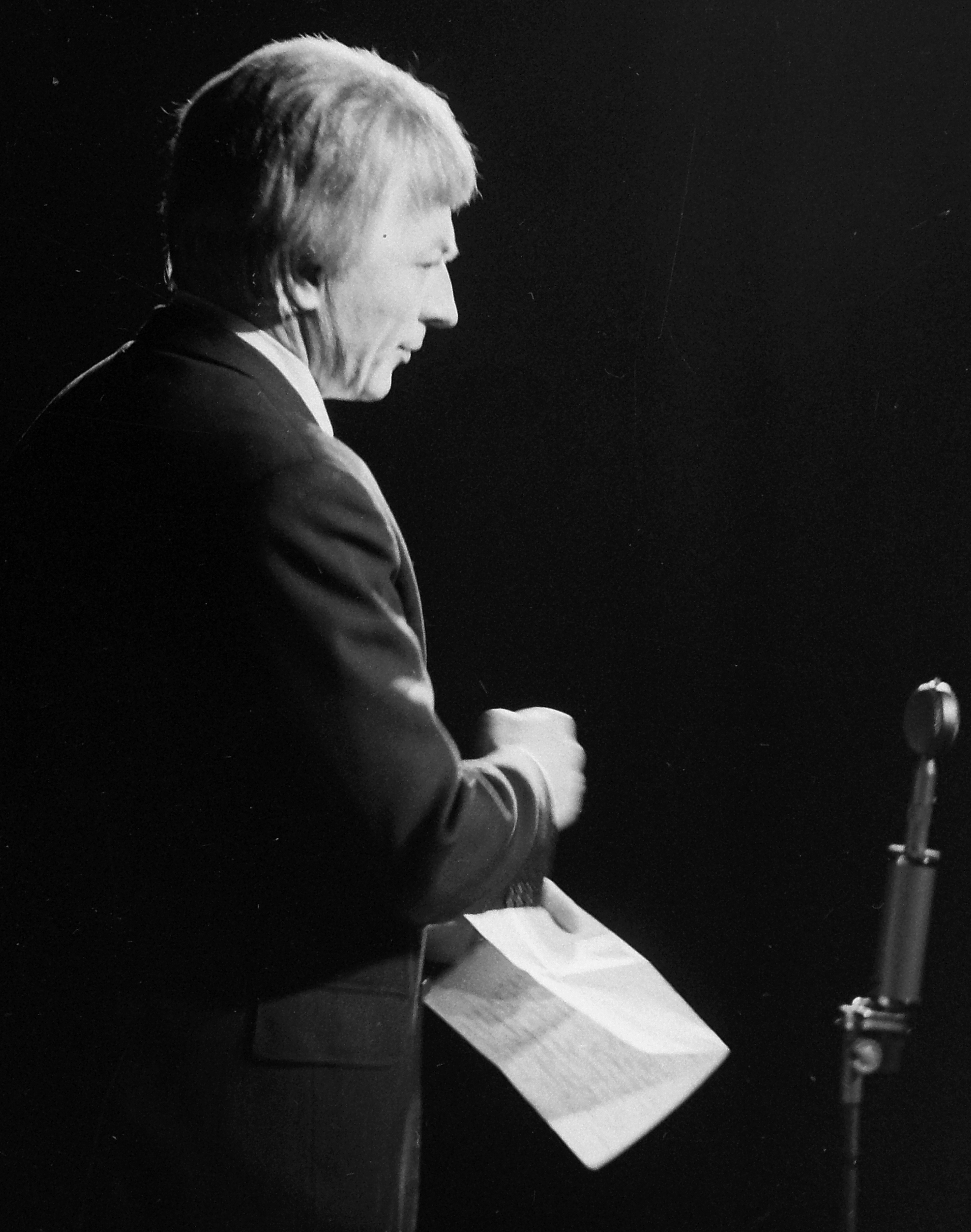
- Born: 17 July 1925; Felsőiszkáz, Hungary
- Died: 30 January 1978 (aged 52); Budapest, Hungary

László Nagy (1925–1978) was a Hungarian poet and translator. He started as a populist poet and in his early youth was a believer in socialist ideology. His oeuvre comprises more than 400 poems and many volumes of translations. He was also a prose writer and graphic artist.

== Personal life ==
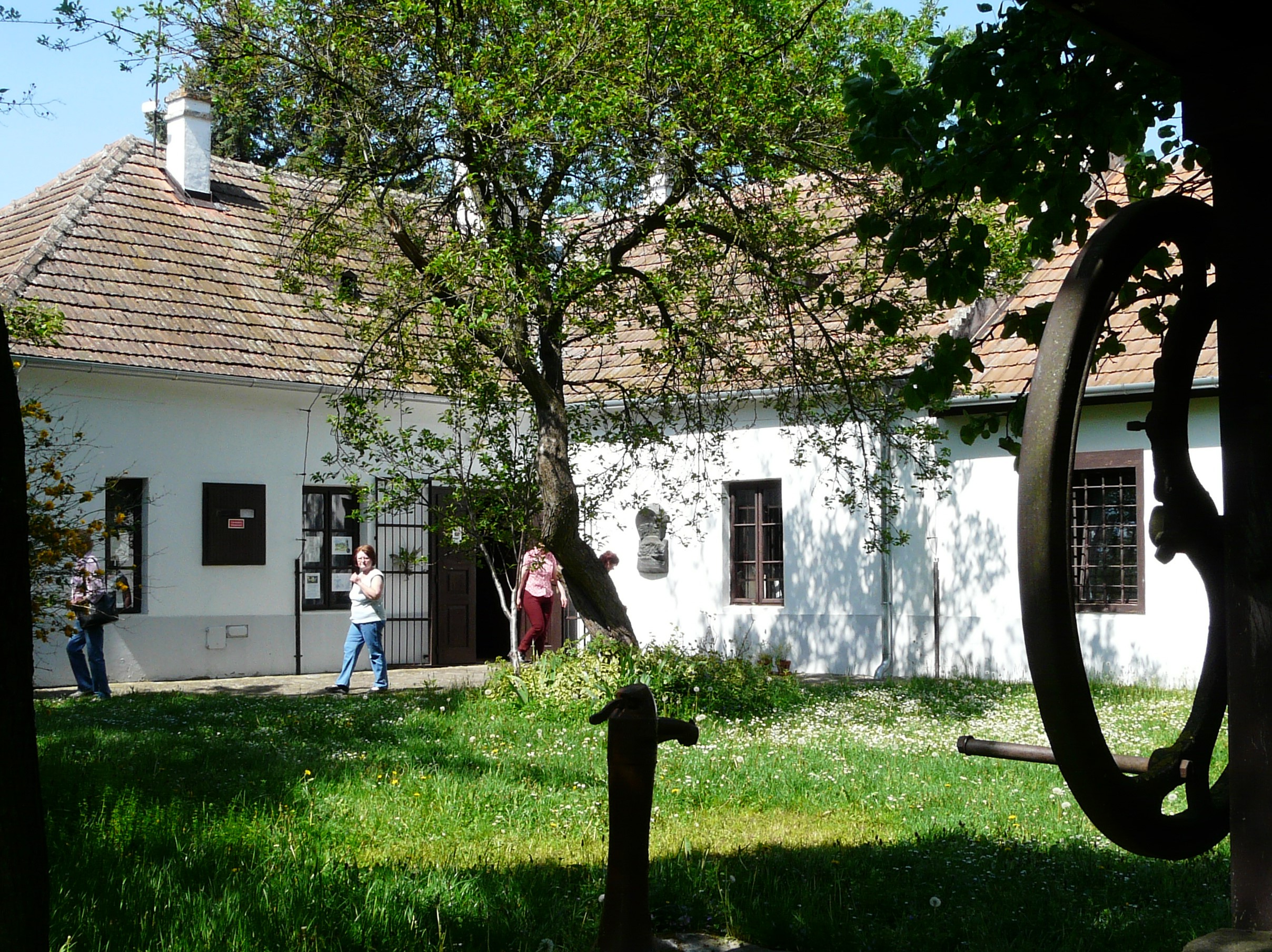
The László Nagy Memorial House in Iszkáz (Hungary, Veszprém County)

Nagy was born in the village of Felsőiszkáz on 17 July 1925, the third of four children; his younger brother also became a poet, writing under the name István Ágh (1938–2025). Nagy became handicapped due to bone marrow inflammation in childhood, and had difficulties in walking. After graduating from high school he went to Budapest where he first wanted to be a graphic artist, and studied drawing, but he was already writing poetry. Various magazines and an anthology published his poems, and in 1948 he decided that he would become a poet. He studied literature, sociology and philosophy at Pázmány Péter Catholic University; later he also started studying Russian so that he could translate the works of Sergey Yesenin. Between 1949 and 1951 he lived in Bulgaria in order to learn the Bulgarian language and be able to translate Bulgarian works into Hungarian. He visited Bulgaria several times in his life. In 1952 he married the poet Margit Szécsi (1928–1990), a year later their son was born.

Between 1953 and 1957, Nagy was chief editor of Kisdobos (a children's magazine during Hungary's Communist era). Later he was mainly a translator, and from 1959 he worked at the important literary magazine Élet és Irodalom ("Life and Literature") until his death. He received the Kossuth Award (this is a prestigious award given to those who significantly enrich Hungary's culture) in 1966. He kept a diary from 1975, and it was later published.

Nagy died in Budapest on 30 January 1978.

== Career ==
Nagy's first poems were influenced by his experiences as a peasant child: village life, proximity to nature, Catholicism, folklore, Hungarian peasant culture with its roots in the pre-Christian era of the nation. Later he started translating poems from various languages, this also influenced his own work. In 1952 his political views changed and this caused a change in his poetry, his poems after that time were full of motifs of dark and cold, he felt that important values were endangered. The suppression of the revolution in 1956 shocked him, and after that he did not publish poems again until 1965.

In the 1960s, his poems were characterized by dramatic oppositions and mythical motifs. Several of his poems (including The Wedding, which he regarded as one of his most important works) are about the loss of traditional values in the modern world. Another main topic during these years were poetic portraits of people like poet Attila József, composer Béla Bartók and painter Tivadar Csontváry Kosztka. Though the majority of his poems use tragical and majestic elements, he also uses irony, grotesque motifs and playfulness.

The main topic and importance of his poetry could be summarized by his 1957 poem Ki viszi át a szerelmet ("Who Will Save Love"), which was already well known in the 1960s and is his best known poem today. The poem is his artistic creed, it asks who would save the important and beautiful things in life even during times of crisis, if poets could not.

== Awards ==
- 1950, 1953, 1955 József Attila Award
- 1968 Golden Wreath
- 1966 Kossuth Prize winner
- 1976 Laureate of the International Botev Prize

== Works ==
- Tűnj el fájás (1949)
- A tüzér és a rozs (1951)
- Gyöngyszoknya (1953)
- Havon delelő szivárvány (1954)
- A nap jegyese (1954)
- Játék Karácsonykor (1956)
- Rege a tűzről és a jácintról (1956)
- A vasárnap gyönyöre (1956)
- A deres majális (1957)
- Ki viszi át a szerelmet (1957)
- Búcsúzik a lovacska (1963)
- Vállamon bárányos éggel (1964)
- Mennyegző (1964)
- Himnusz minden időben (1965)
- Zöld Angyal (1965)
- Arccal a tengernek (1966)
- Ég és föld (1971)
- Versben bújdosó (1973)
- Erdőn, mezőn gyertya (1975)
- Versek és versfordítások I-III. (1975)
- Válogatott versek (1976)
- Csodafiú-szarvas (1977)
- Kísérlet a bánat ellen (1978)
- Jönnek a harangok értem (1978)
- Szárny és piramis (1980)
- Didergő ezüstfiú (1981)
- Nagy László legszebb versei (1982)
- Nagy László összegyűjtött versei (1988)
- Inkarnáció ezüstben (1993)
- Krónika töredékek (1994)
- Legszebb versei (1995)
- Válogatott versek (1995)
