= Endre Fejes =

Hungarian writer

- Fejes Endre
- Born: 15 September 1923; Józsefváros, Hungary
- Died: 25 August 2015 (aged 91); Budapest, Hungary
- Writing career
- Language: Hungarian

Endre Fejes (15 September 1923 – 25 August 2015) was a Kossuth Prize and Attila József Prize-winning Hungarian author, and a founding member of the Digital Literary Academy, with his literary works often based on working life.

== Literary career ==
In 1955 he began to publish his stories, in particular, the Budapest working life. The first novel, A hazudós, was published in 1958. His most notable novel, Rozsdatemető, was a best seller in its publication in 1962.

== Bibliography ==
- A hazudós (short story, 1958)
- Rozsdatemető (novel, 1962, published in English as "Generation of Rust")
- Vidám cimborák (short story, 1966)
- Mocorgó (drama, 1966)
- Jó estét nyár, jó estét szerelem (novel, 1969)
- Kéktiszta szerelem (plays, 1971)
- Cserepes Margit házassága (drama, 1972)
- A hazudós (and other works) (1973)
- Szerelemről bolond éjszakán (novel, 1975)
- Gondolta a fene (essays, 1977)
- A fiú, akinek angyalarca volt (novel, 1982)
- Vonó Ignác (drama, comedy, 1978)
- Drámák (drama, 1989)
- Szegény Vivaldi (short stories, essays, confessions, 1992)
- Lemaradt angyalok (short story, 1993)
- Szabadlábon (short stories, novel details, 1995)
