= Margit Szécsi =

Hungarian poet

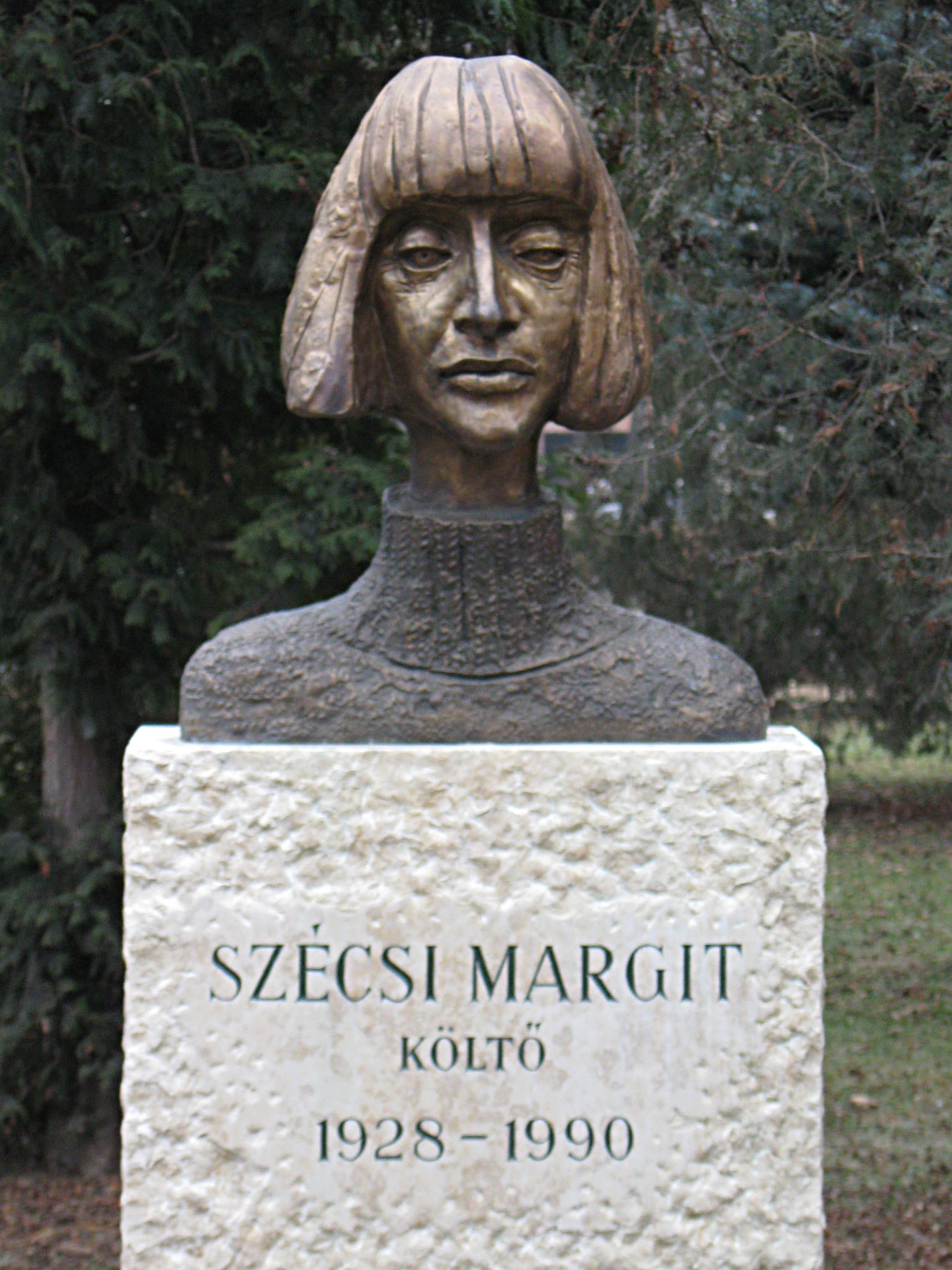
Margit Szécsi

Margit Szécsi (May 28, 1928 – November 23, 1990) was a Hungarian poet.

She was born in Budapest to a poor family and studied at Budapest University under a scholarship for the proletariat. She did not complete her degree but instead joined the staff of the literary magazine Csillag in 1949. She also began writing her first poems around this time. Her first collection of poems Március (March) was published in 1955. She married the poet László Nagy.

== Awards ==
She was awarded the Attila József Prize in 1957.

== Selected works ==
- Angyalok strandja (Angels' beach) (1956)
- Páva a tuzfalon (Peacock on the partition) (1958)
- A trombitákat összesöprik (They'll sweep up the trumpets) (1965)
- Új heraldika (New heraldry) (1967)
- A Nagy Virágvágó Gép (The great flower cutting machine) (1969)
