= Lajos Áprily =

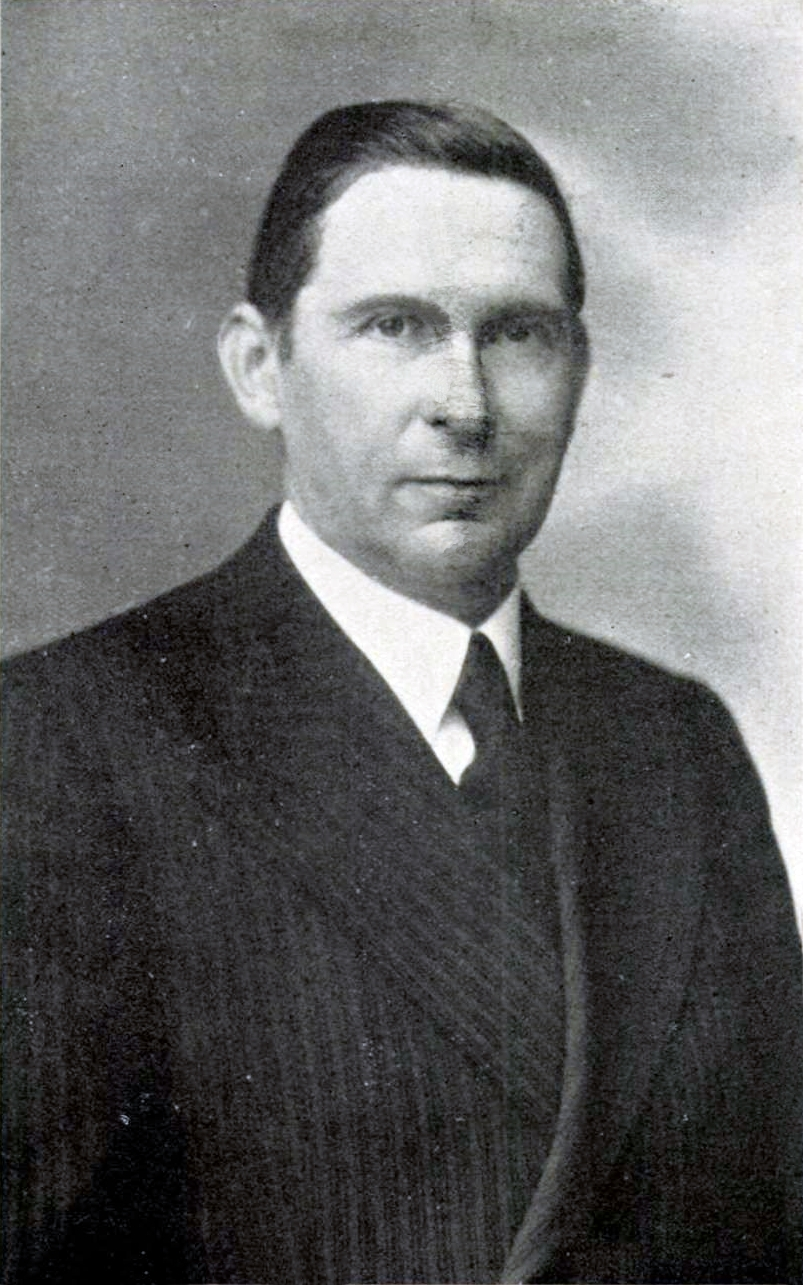
- A pre-1940 photo of the writer
- Born: Lajos Jékely; 14 November 1887; Brassó, Austria-Hungary
- Died: 6 August 1967 (aged 79); Budapest, Hungary
- Citizenship: Hungarian
- Education: Reformed College in Kolozsvár; University of Burgundy
- Occupations: poet, translator
- Spouse: Ida Schéfer
- Children: Zoltán Jékely
- Writing career
- Pen name: Lajos Áprily
- Language: Hungarian
- Period: 1921–1965
- Genre: literary translation
- Notable works: Vers vagy te is, Idahegyi pásztorok, Rönk a Tiszán
- Notable awards: Attila József Prize, 1954
- Literary movement: impressionism, lyricism

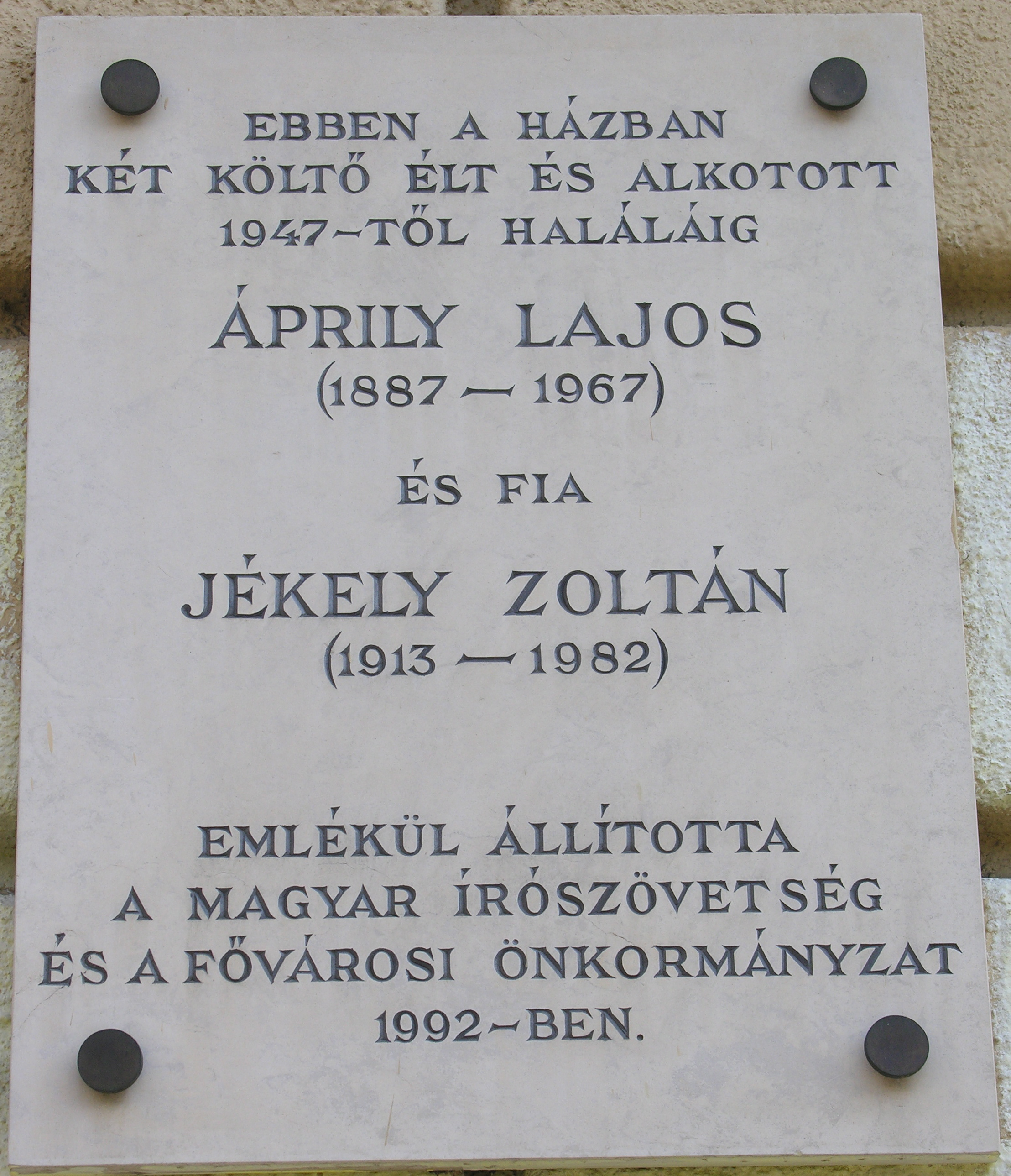
Commemorative plaque for Lajos Áprily and his son Zoltán Jékely at 21 Frankel Leó Street, Budapest District II.

Lajos Áprily (birth name Lajos Jékely; 14 November 1887 – 6 August 1967) was a Hungarian poet and translator who won the 1954 Attila József Prize for his contributions to Hungarian literature. Áprily was born 14 November 1887 in Brassó, Austria-Hungary (now the city of Brașov in Romania) and died 6 August 1967 in Budapest; he was the father of Zoltán Jékely (1913-1982), also a poet and translator.

Áprily's poems usually made use of classical forms and versification; they are characterized by impressionistic descriptions of nature. Major themes of his poetry are nature, family, grief over the loss of loved ones, and the ideas of peace, humanity and mutual respect between individuals and nations. His basic mood is warm, melancholic, reserved and unpretentious. He was a champion of disciplined, tight forms; his style embodied elegance, taste and refinement. From 1921 to 1965 he published several collections of poems and translations from French and Russian; he also wrote verse dramas, translating Pushkin's Eugene Onegin, Ibsen's Peer Gynt and other works.

== Biography ==
Lajos Áprily's original name was Lajos Jékely. He attended elementary and secondary school in Parajd (now Praid, Romania) and Székelyudvarhely (now Odorheiu Secuiesc), two towns which still have Hungarian-speaking majority populations. From 1899, he studied at the Protestant Reformed College in Kolozsvár (now Cluj-Napoca). His teachers included famed musicologist and folklorist János Seprődi (1874–1923) and Hungarian writer and editor Dezső Kovács (1866–1935). To this day Cluj retains a sizable ethnic Hungarian minority population.

In 1909 Jékely earned his teacher's degree and became instructor of German and Hungarian language and literature at Bethlen Gábor Kollégium in Nagyenyed (Colegiul Național Bethlen, Aiud, Romania). In 1911 he married Ida Schéfer; in 1913, whilst they were still living in Nagyenyed, their eldest son, the poet, writer and translator Zoltán Jékely, was born.

After Kovács had reprimanded him over the supposed "modern tone" of some of his poems, Jékely refrained from publishing for several years. In 1918, however, he began using the pen name Lajos Áprily for his writings in the magazine Uj Erdély ("New Transylvania"). He soon became a member of three literary societies, Erdélyi Irodalmi Társaság, Kisfaludy Társaság and Kemény Zsigmond Társaság. By 1923 he had earned a degree in French language at the University of Burgundy in Dijon.

In 1926 he and his family returned to the town where he had studied from the age of 12, when it had been known as Kolozsvár, but in 1920, it became part of Romania. Here he taught languages and literature at the Reformed College. In 1928 he became editor of Erdélyi Helikon.

In 1929 the family moved from Romania to Budapest, where in 1934 the poet was named as director of Baár-Madas, at that time a boarding school for girls. One of his pupils there was the polyglot poet and translator Ágnes Nemes Nagy (1922-1991). In the fall of 1935 he began a half-year study tour in northern and western Europe. In 1942 the family moved back to Parajd in Transylvania (the Northern part of which returned to Hungary in 1940) for a short time, before they resettled in 1943 to Szentgyörgypuszta, a farm near Visegrád.

== Works ==
- 1921: Falusi elégia ("Rural elegy"), poems
- 1923: Esti párbeszéd ("Evening dialogues"), poems
- 1926: Rasmussen hajóján ("Rasmussen's ship"), poems
- 1926: Vers vagy te is, poems
- 1926: Idahegyi pásztorok, verse drama
- 1934: Rönk a Tiszán, poems
- 1934: Úti jegyzetek. Egy pedagógiai vándorlás megfigyelései
  ("Travel notes: Pedagogical observations"), travelogue
- 1939: A láthatatlan írás ("Invisible writing"), poems
- 1964: Az aranyszarvas ("The golden stag"), translations
- 1965: Fecskék, özek, farkasok ("Swallows, deer and wolves"), stories
- 1965: Jelentés a völgyből ("Report from the valley"), poems
- 1965: Ábel füstje ("Abel's Sacrifice"), selected poems

== Selected poems in English translation ==
- Antigoné ("Antigone", Watson Kirkconnell, trans.)
- Március ("March in Transylvania", Ádám Makkai, trans.)
- Kolozsvári éjjel ("Night in Kolozsvár", Watson Kirkconnell, trans.)
- Kérés az öregséghez ("Plea to old age", Doreen Bell, trans.)
