= Menyhért Lakatos =

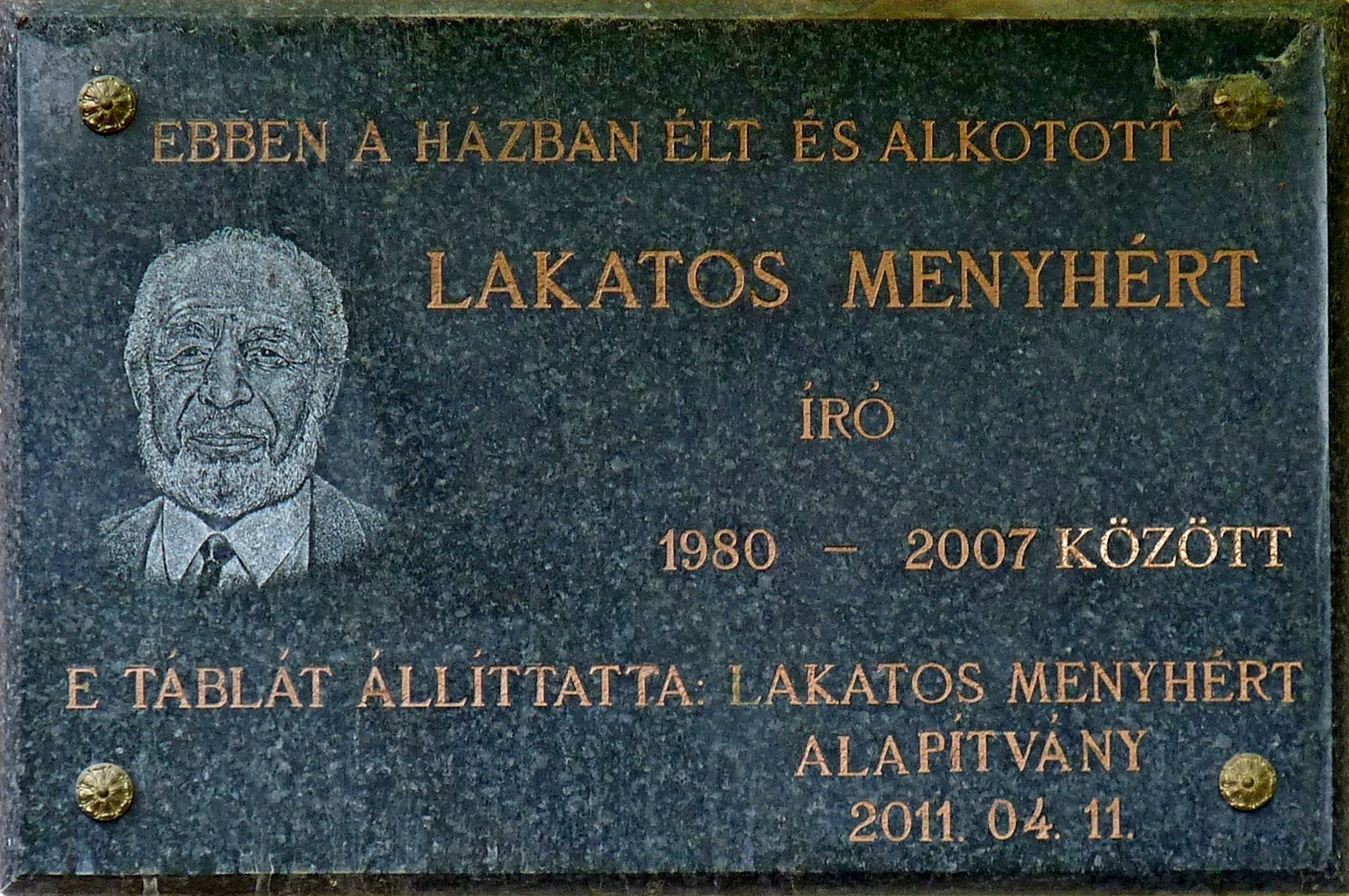
Commemorative plaque to Mr. Menyhért Lakatos

Menyhért Lakatos (April 11, 1926, Vésztő — August 21, 2007, Budapest) was a Hungarian Romani writer.

Since 1988 he was President of the Hungarian Romani Cultural Association (Magyarországi Cigányok Kulturális Szövetsége).

His most famous book, Füstös képek ("Images in Smoke", translated in English as The Color of Smoke) is a novel based on personal experience, set in World War II. It is a bildungsroman that shows life in a Roma village in Northeast Hungary, from 1940 until the German occupation of the country in 1944 when Roma people were put into death camps. While filled with amusing anecdotes, a petty criminal subplot, and adolescent eroticism, it portrays dehumanization of Romani in the society.

The Lakatos Menyhért School in Budapest is named in his honour.

== Books ==
- 1975: Füstös képek
  - Bulgarian: Окадени картини, 1977
  - German: Bitterer Rauch. Verlag Volk und Welt. Berlin 1978 (ISBN 9783421018335), 1979, 1980, 1982
  - French: Couleur de fumée : une épopée tzigane, Paris, Actes Sud, 1986.
  - English: The Color of Smoke: An Epic Novel of the Roma, 2015, ISBN 0985062347
- 1975: Angárka és Busladarfi
- 1979: A hét szakállas farkas
- 1979: A paramisák ivadékai
- 1981: Az öreg fazék titka
- 1981: Csandra szekere
  - German: Csandras Karren. Zigeunergeschichten. Volk und Welt, Berlin 1984
- 1982: Akik élni akarta
- 1995: Hosszú éjszakák meséi
  - German: Märchen der langen Nächte. Roma-Märchen. Wieser Verlag, Klagenfurt 2004 (ISBN 9783851294538), 1999
- 1998: A titok
- 1999: Tenyérből mondtál jövendőt

== Awards ==
Significant awards include:

- 2000: National Romani Self-Government Lifetime Achievement Award
- 1999: Hungarian Laurel Wreath Award
- 1995: Book of the Year Award
- 1993: Attila József Prize
- 1976: Attila József Prize
- 1976: Milán Füst Prize
