= Noémi Kiss =

Hungarian writer (born 1974)

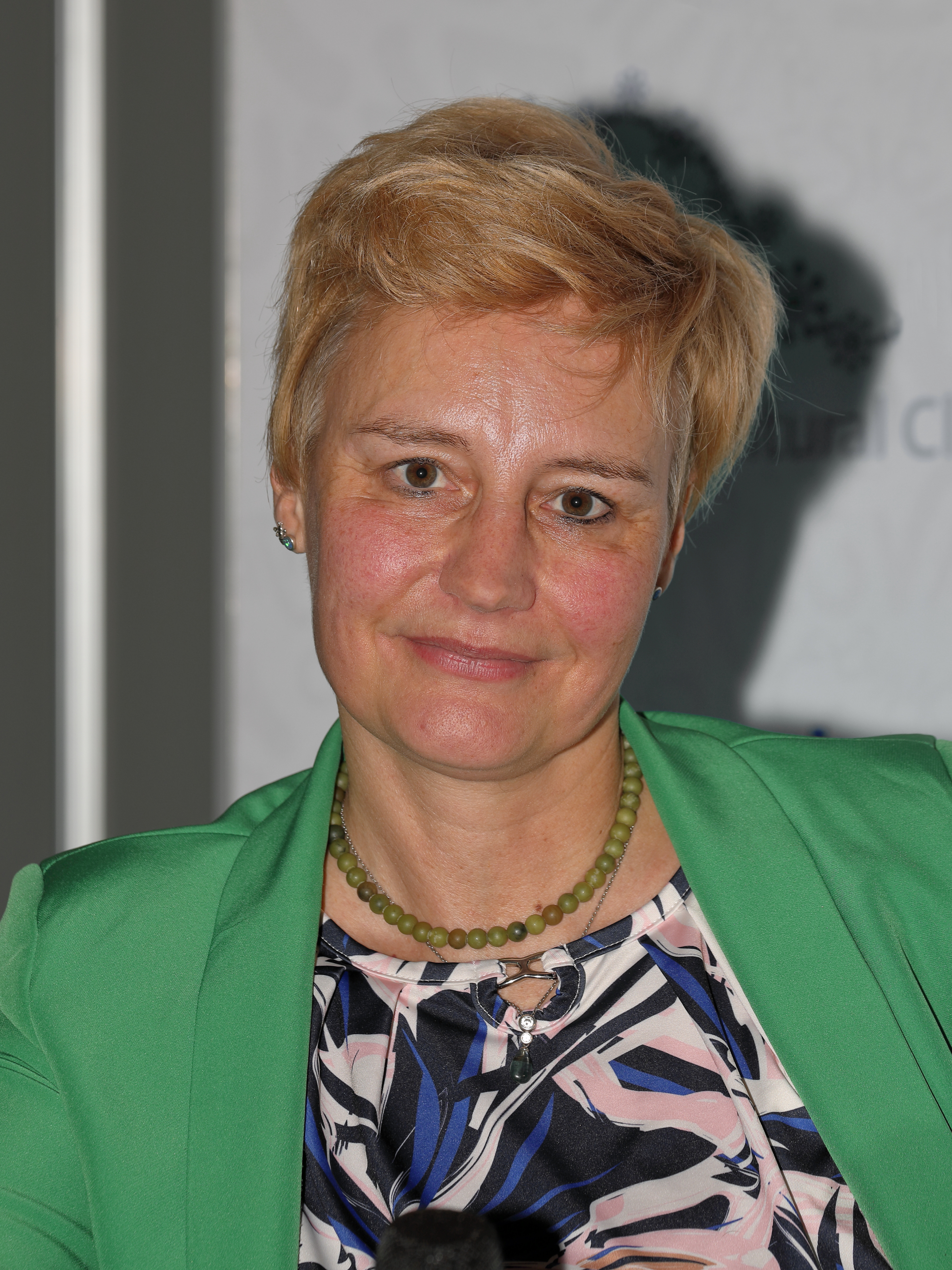
- Born: 1974 (age 51–52); Gödöllő, Hungary
- Education: University of Konstanz; University of Miskolc
- Occupations: Novelist; Short story writer
- Writing career
- Language: Hungarian

Noémi Kiss (born in 1974 in Gödöllő) is a Hungarian writer, whose works have been translated into English, German, Bulgarian, Romanian and Serbian. The German press considered Kiss as one of the most promising writers of her generation.

== Biography ==
Kiss studied Comparative literature, Sociology and Hungarian Studies at the University of Konstanz in Germany, and also at the University of Miskolc in Hungary, where she has been a lecturer since 2000. She received her PhD from the University of Miskolc in 2003 for a dissertation on Paul Celan, published with the title Határhelyzetek. Paul Celan költészete és magyar recepciója (Borderline cases: Paul Celan’s poetry and its Hungarian reception). Kiss regularly publishes short stories, and fictional travelogues on Eastern Europe, and essays on photography and literature.

She has been an associate professor at the Eszterházy Károly Catholic University of Eger since autumn of 2023.

She is a writer and traveler. Her fiction features independent and vulnerable female figures, who sometimes flirt with the eccentric, but more often struggle in all-too-familiar environments. Her novel Sovány angyalok (Thin Angels, 2015) tells the story of a homicide by an abused woman, Ikeranya (Mother of Twins, 2013) seeks a new language to speak about pregnancy and motherhood, while Trans (2006, in German: Was geschah während wir schliefen, 2009) adventures into the realm of sexuality, borderline experiences, role changes. Her latest book Balaton (2020) portrays the hidden tensions under the surface of a both multicultural and hopelessly parochial environment of the most popular holiday resort of the 1980s in Hungary during the final years of dictatorship from the viewpoint of the stories’ young girl narrators. The piece published here is from the second, enlarged edition of Rongyos ékszerdoboz (The Tattered Jewel Box, 2018; first edition: 2009, in German: Schäbiges Schmuckkästchen, 2014), a collection of Eastern European travelogues balancing on the edge of fiction and essay. Kiss also teaches literature at the University of Miskolc, her academic books include an exploration of photography and literature, and a monograph on Paul Celan.

Kiss often attends international literature festivals, among others in Berlin, Graz, Hamburg, Krems, Timișoara, Ruse. In 2009, she was a fellow at the Literarisches Colloquium in Berlin and in 2013/2014, she was writer-in-residence in Zurich.

Kiss is a mother of twins, a boy and a girl born in 2010. She resides in Budapest with her family.

== Major works ==
- Tájgyakorlatok. Budapest: JAK-Kijárat, 2003. (short stories)
- Határhelyzetek. Paul Celan költészete és magyar recepciója. Budapest: Anonymous, 2003.
- Trans. Budapest: Magvető, 2006. (short stories)
- Was geschah während wir schliefen. Berlin: Matthes und Seitz, 2009. (in German)
- Trans. Belgrade: Agora, 2007. (in Serbian)
- Rongyos ékszerdoboz. Budapest: Magvető, 2009. (short stori.es/travelogue)
- Schäbiges Schmuckkästchen. Resien in den Osten Europas. Berlin/München/Zürich: Europa Verlag, 2014. (short stories/travelogue) (in German)
- Fotográfia és irodalom. Miskolc: Műút, 2011. (essays on photography and literature)
- Ikeranya. Budapest: Magvető, 2013. (short stories)
- Sovány angyalok. Budapest: Magvető, 2015. (novel)
- Lámpaoltó Pöttyös néni. Budapest: Pagony, 2018. (children book)
- Rongyos ékszerdoboz - Utazások Kelet-Európában II. Magvető, 2018. (short stories/travelogue)
- Balaton. Magvető, Budapest: Magvető 2020 (short stories)
- Balaton. Europa Verlag, München, 2021 (short stories)
- A Bálna és a Srác. Pagony Kiadó, 2021. (children book)
- Karácsony a Dunán. Novellák, 2022. (short stories)
