= István Ágh (poet) =

Hungarian poet (1938–2025)

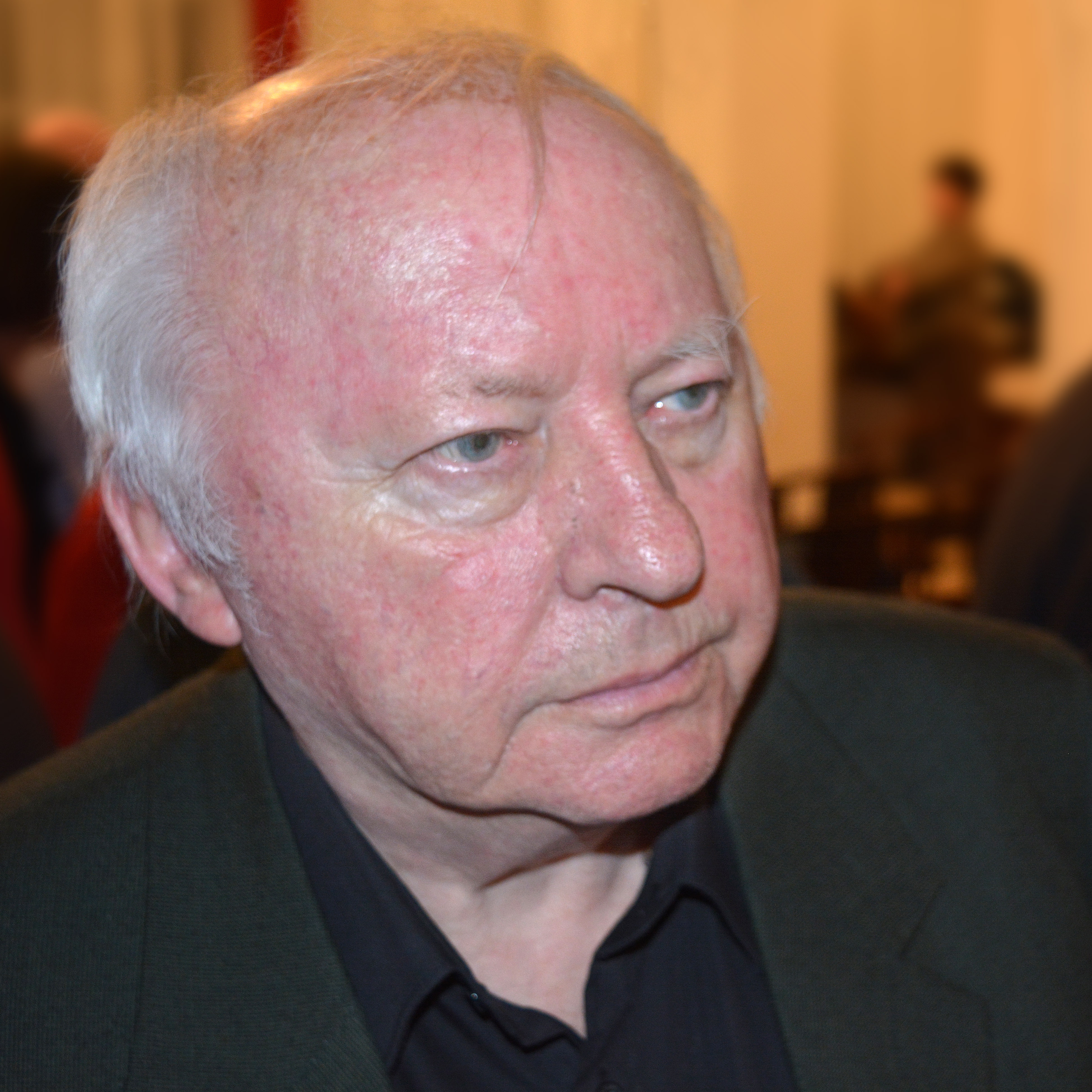
- Ágh in 2016
- Born: István Nagy; 24 March 1938; Iszkáz, Hungary
- Died: 19 October 2025 (aged 87); Hungary

István Ágh (born István Nagy; 24 March 1938 – 19 October 2025) was a Hungarian poet. He was the younger brother of László Nagy who was also a poet. Ágh died on 19 October 2025, at the age of 87.

== Awards ==
- Kossuth Prize (1992)
- Attila József Prize (1969) and (1980)
