= Félix Bódog Widder =

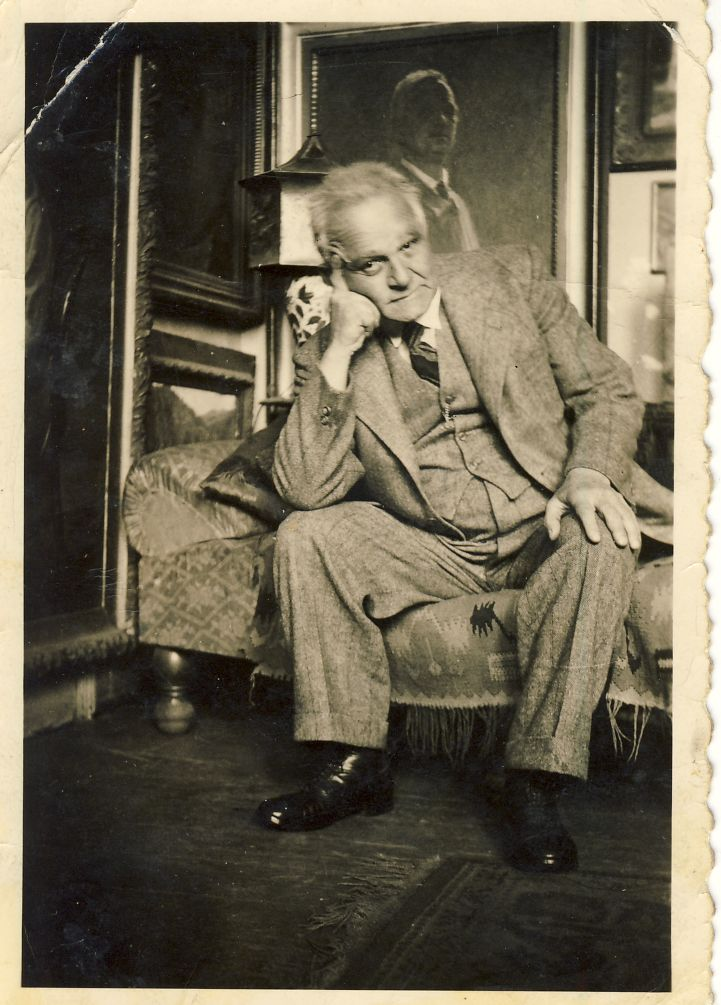
- Born: Widder Félix; 28 April 1874; Arad, Kingdom of Hungary (now Romania)
- Died: 26 September 1939 (aged 65); Budapest
- Known for: Painting, graphic design, teaching
- Movement: Impressionism

Félix Bódog Widder (Hungarian: [ˈfeːliks ˈboːdoɡ ˈviddɛr]; 28 April 1874 – 26 September 1939) was a Hungarian painter, graphic designer and teacher.

== Family and education ==
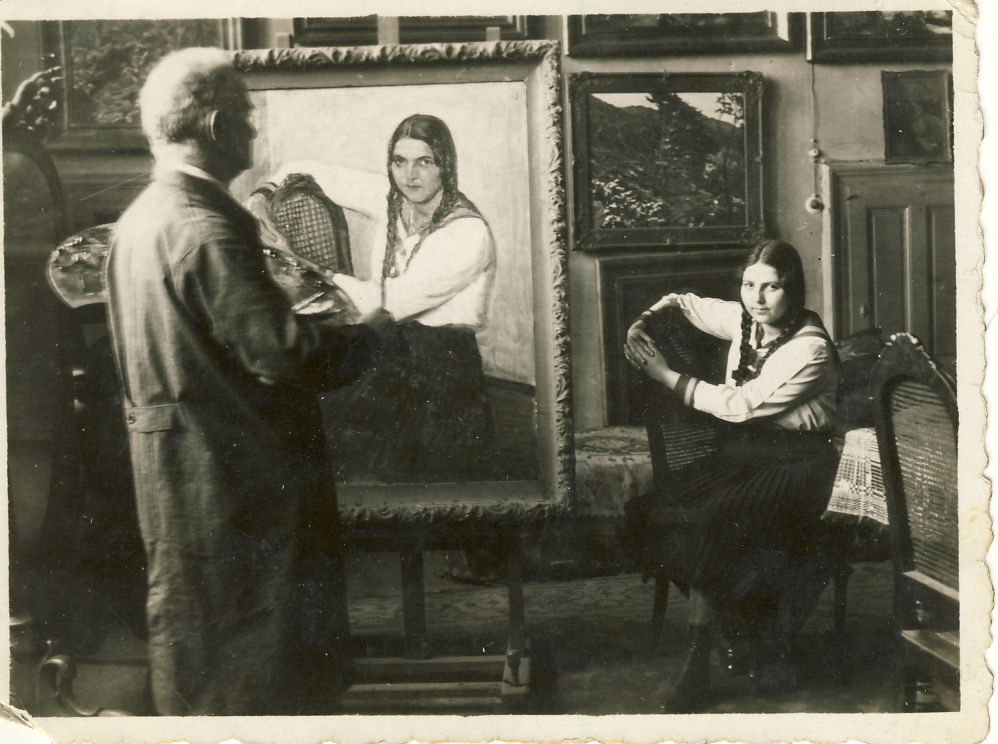
Félix Bódog Widder paints his daughter, Magda Widder at his studio

Félix Bódog Widder was born on 28 April 1874 in Arad. His daughter was Magda Widder, the wife of poet Béla Vihar and the mother of Judit Vihar. He studied in Paris and Munich. He was an impressionist painter. He made the paint by hand for his paintings.

== Gallery ==
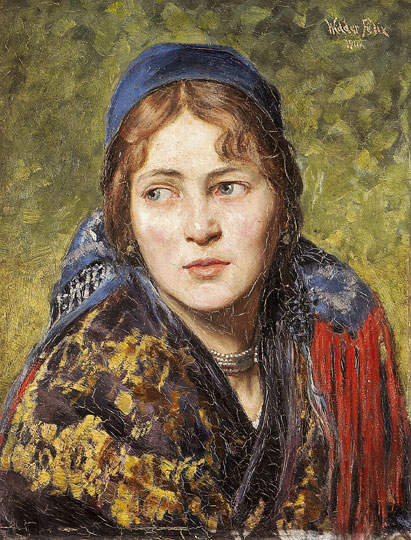
Young Woman, 1902

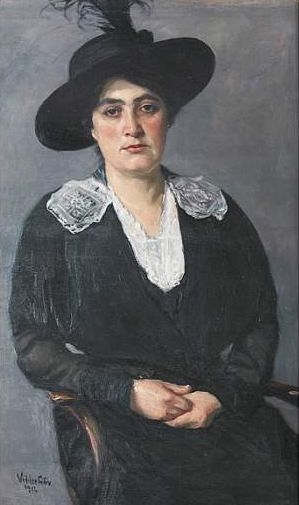
Portrait of my wife, 1916

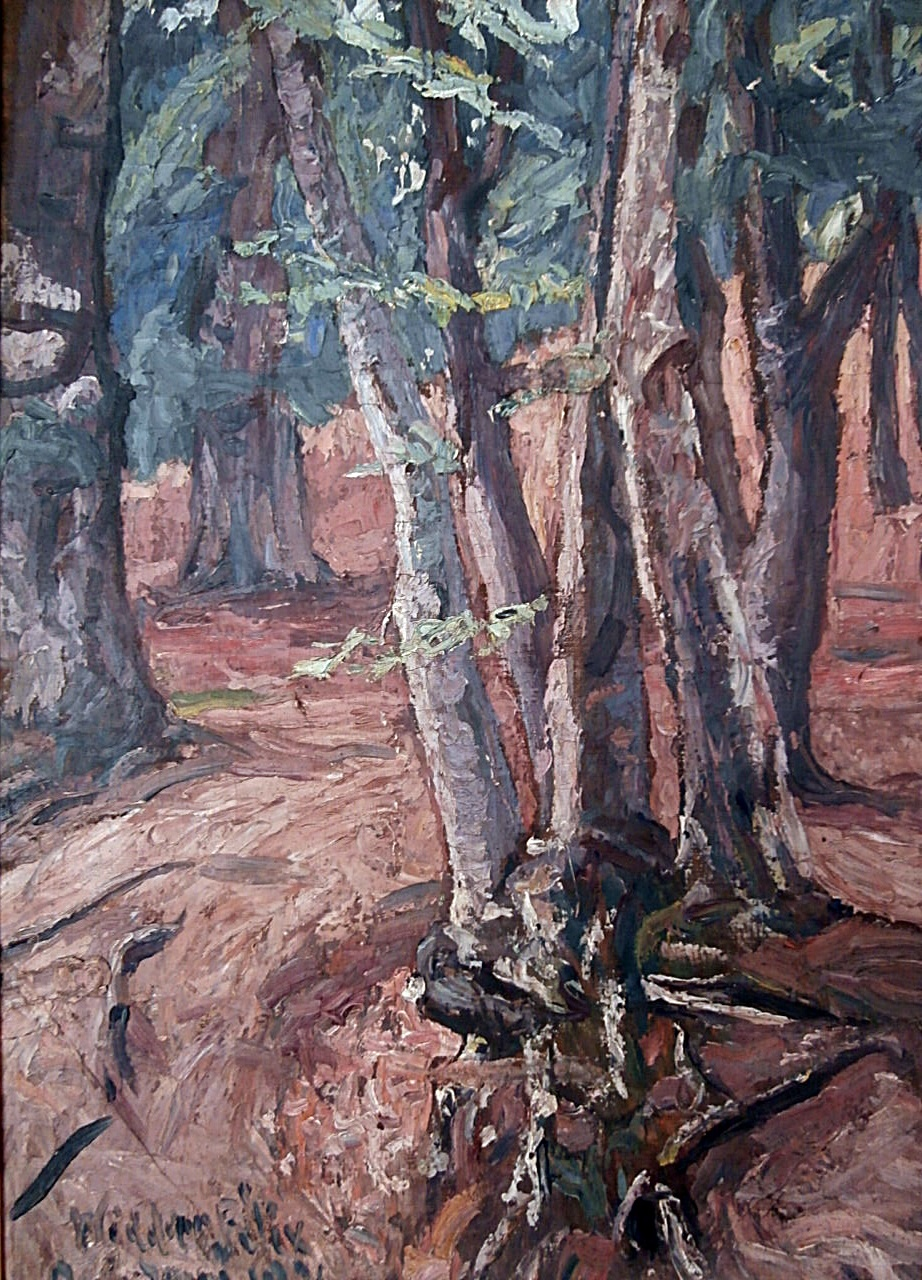
Diósjenő 1926

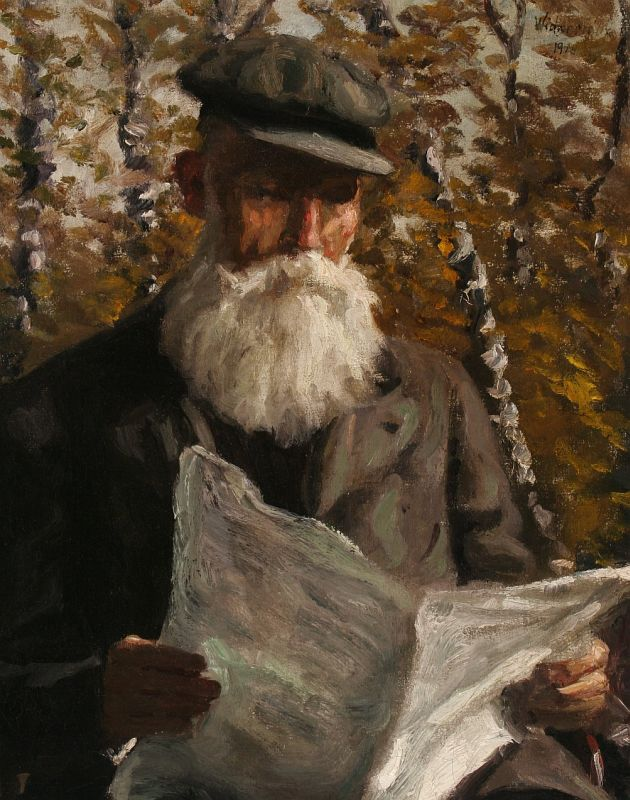
Mednyánszky, 1919

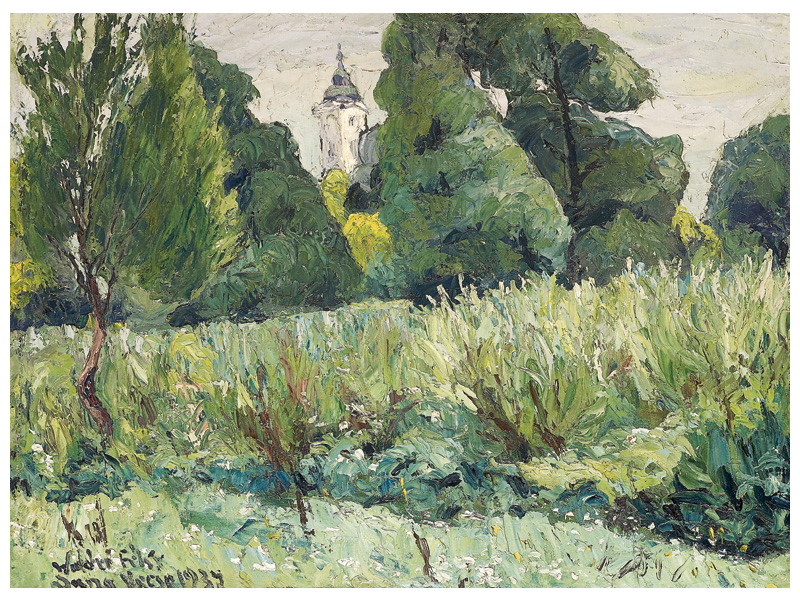
Dunavecse, 1939

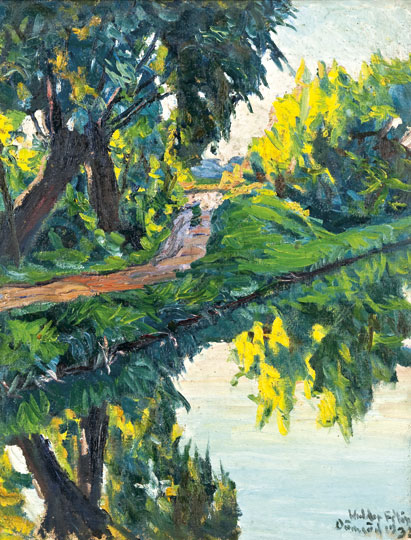
Dömsöd, 1932 .

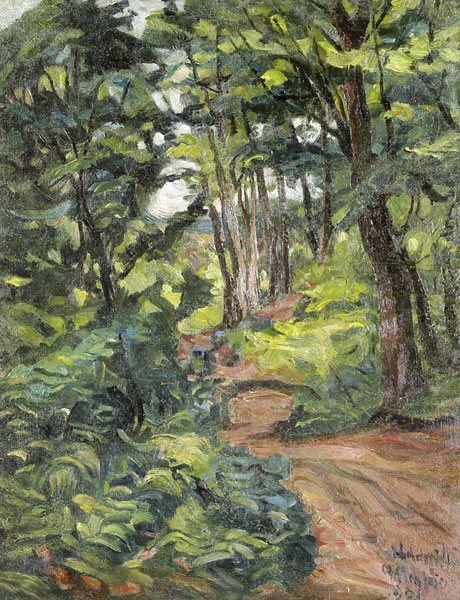
Mátrafüred, 1921.

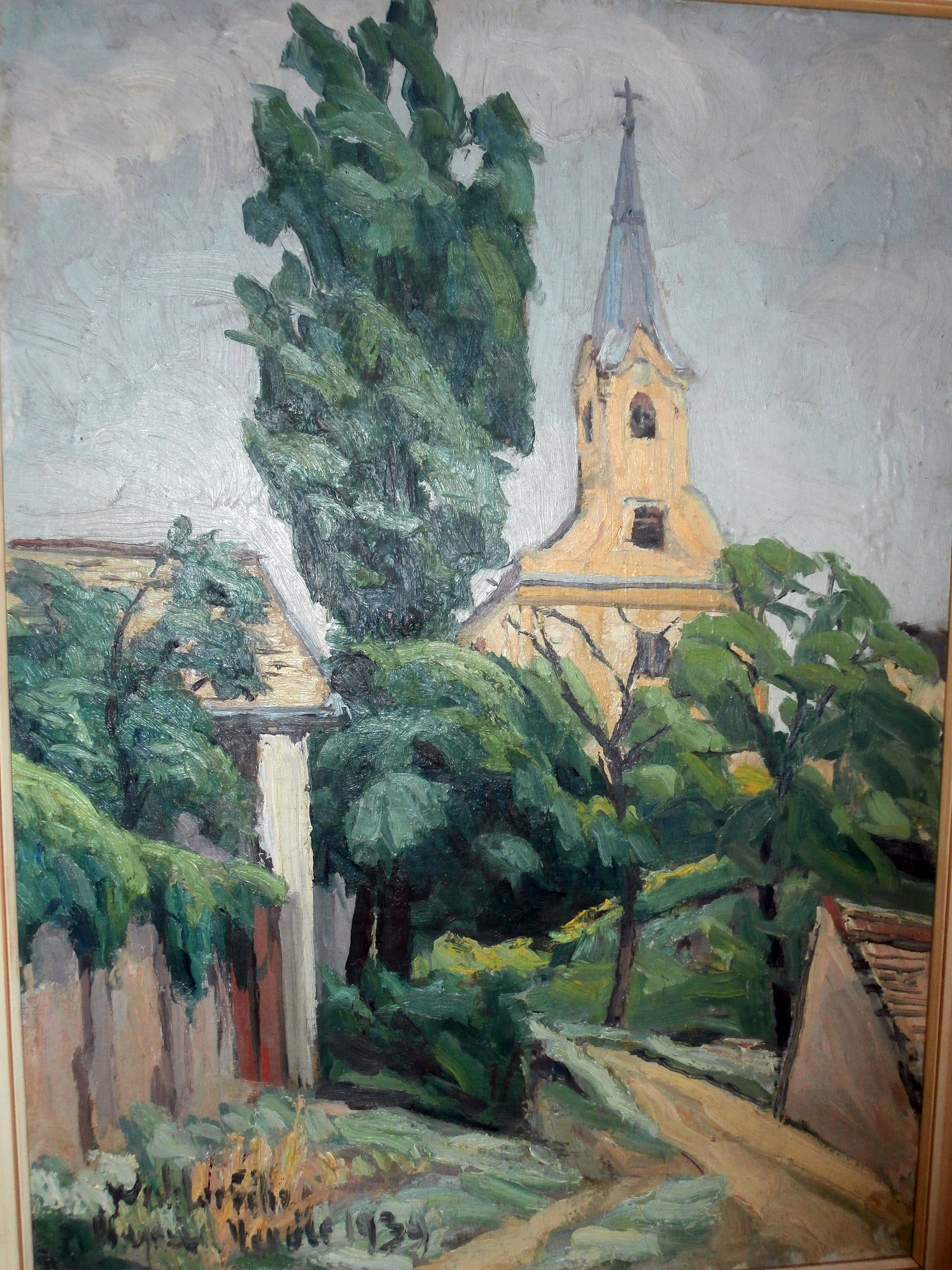
Nógrádverőce 1934

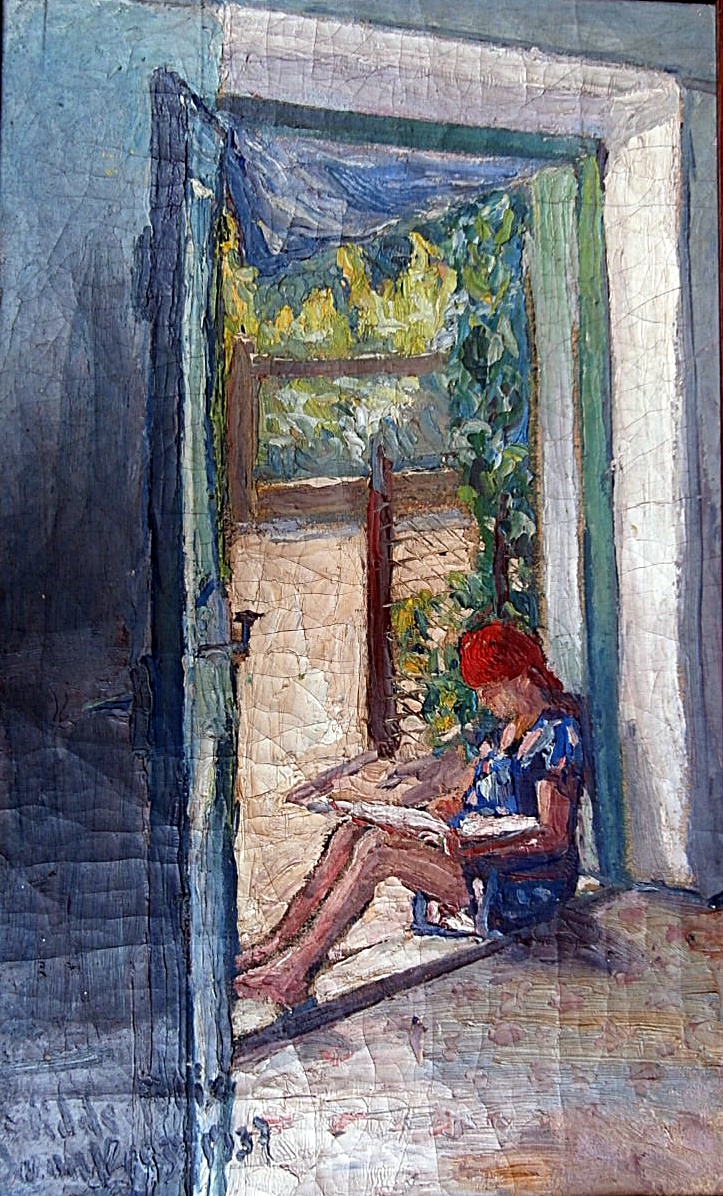
kép Börzsönyben 1937

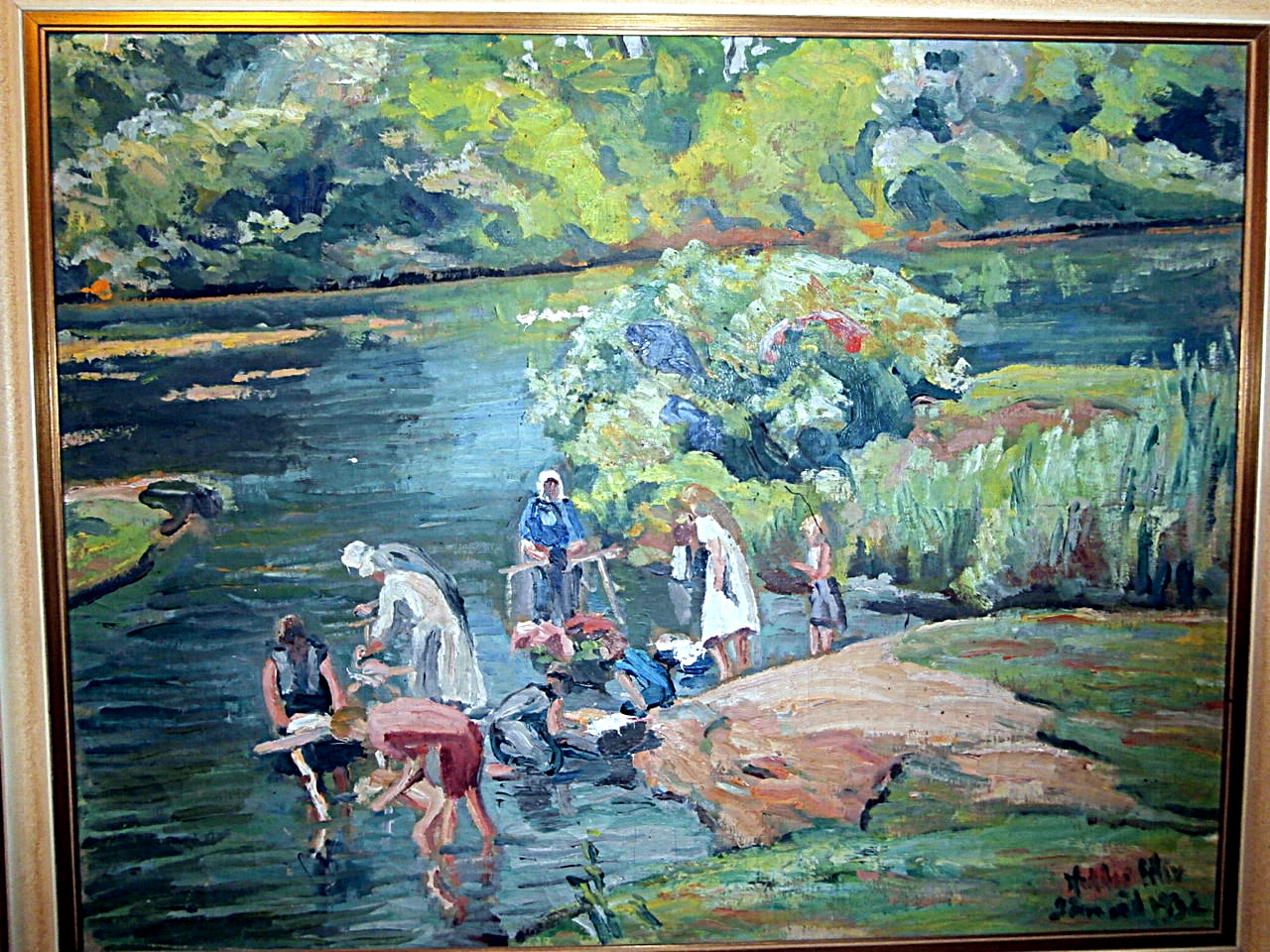
Nagymosás 1932

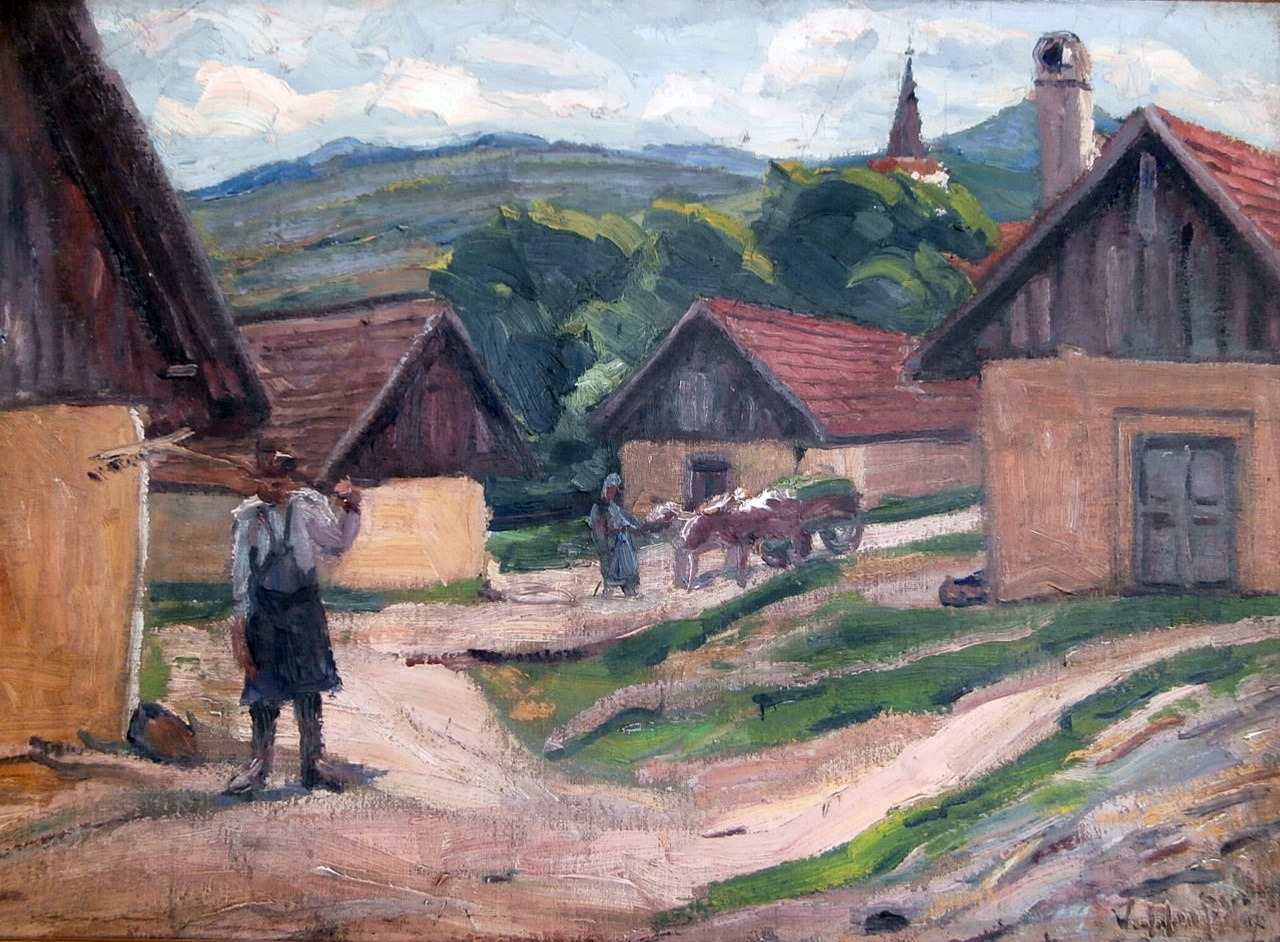
Falusi házak

== Bibliography ==
- Programm der Volksschulen der deutsch-ung. evang. Kirchengemeinde A. C. in Budapest für das Schuljahr 1880–1881 II. Jahrgang (in German). Budapest: Carl Münster Nyomdája. 1881. p. 41.
