= Zsófia Balla =

Romanian-born Hungarian poet and essayist

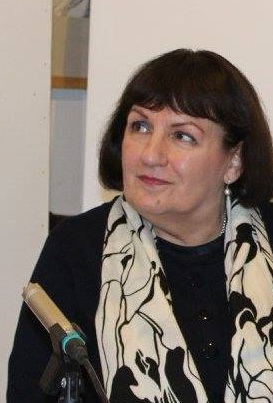
Zsófia Balla, Image: László Horváth

Zsófia Balla (born 15 January 1949) is a Romanian-born Hungarian poet and essayist. She is considered to be one of the most prominent female poets in Hungary.

== Biography ==
Balla was born in the Romanian city of Cluj to ethnic Hungarian parents. Her father was a writer and her mother a German teacher. She studied music (violin) at the Cluj Academy of Music, graduating in 1972. After divorcing her first husband, she married the poet Csaba Báthori in 1997.

After publishing her first poems in the journal Igaz Szó in 1965, her first collection of poetry A dolgok emlékezete (Memories of Things) was published in Bucharest in 1968. From 1972, she worked in the Hungarian department of the Cluj radio station as music editor until the station was closed in 1985. Thereafter, she worked as a journalist for the national Romanian newspaper Elore and as literary editor for two weekly magazines. In 1990, she became a member of the Hungarian Writers Association and in 1992 she joined the editorial board of the Hungarian literary magazine Jelenkor. Since 1993, she has been living in Budapest, Hungary.

== Awards ==
Considered to be one of the most prominent women poets in Hungary, she has received many awards, including the Romanian Writers Association Prize (1984 and 1991) and the Hungarian Attila József Prize in 1996. In 2008, she became a Laureate of the Hungarian Republic (Magyar Köztársaság Babérkoszorúja).

== Selected works ==
Balla has published the following collections of poetry:

- 1968: A dolgok emlékezete, Irodalmi és Művészeti Kiadó, Bucharest
- 1971: Apokrif ének, Kriterion, Bucharest
- 1975: Vízláng versek, Kriterion, Bucharest
- 1980: Második személy, Kriterion, Bucharest
- 1983: Kolozsvári táncok, Kriterion, Bucharest
- 1985: Hóka fóka fióka (nursery rhyme), Kriterion, Bucharest
- 1991: A páncél nyomai, Kriterion, Bucharest, 1991
- 1993: Egy pohár fű, Jelenkor, Pécs
- 1995: Ahogyan élsz, Jelenkor, Pécs
- 1997: Triangulum, avagy száz ördög közt három szentek (poetry for puppets), Seneca, Budapest
- 2002: A harmadik történet, Jelenkor, Pécs, ISBN 9636763097
- 2009: A nyár barlangja, Budapest, Kalligram Kiadó
