= Anna Dániel =

Anna Dániel (July 10, 1908 - September 17, 2003) was a writer, literary historian and teacher born in Budapest, Hungary. For her work, she was awarded the József Attila Prize.

== Life ==
Anna Daniel graduated from the Pázmány Péter Science University as a French and German teacher, but also taught Hungarian and world literature. She started her teaching career at the Erzsébet School. Her husband was economist Kerékgyártó János (1909-1968).

She published several novels and young adult novels. She wrote for newspapers and translated from French and German. She was a member of the Hungarian Writer Alliance.

== Work ==
=== Novels ===
- Somehow we need to live... (Bp.: Révai, 1933)
- Princess Elisabeth (Bp.: Dante 1938-1944 és Móra Ferenc Könyvkiadó 1992-2012)
- Run who fears (Bp.: Szépirodalmi Könyvkiadó, 1977)
- Teresa's mission (Bp.: Kossuth Kiadó, 1986)

=== Youth novels ===
- Flora (Bp.: Révai, 1931)
- The day of meetings (Bp.: Móra, 1977)
- Accident (Bp.: Móra, 1979)[13] Cseh, lengyel, lett nyelven is.
- The band (Bp.: Móra, 1983)
