= Géza Morcsányi =

Hungarian actor and academic (1952–2023)

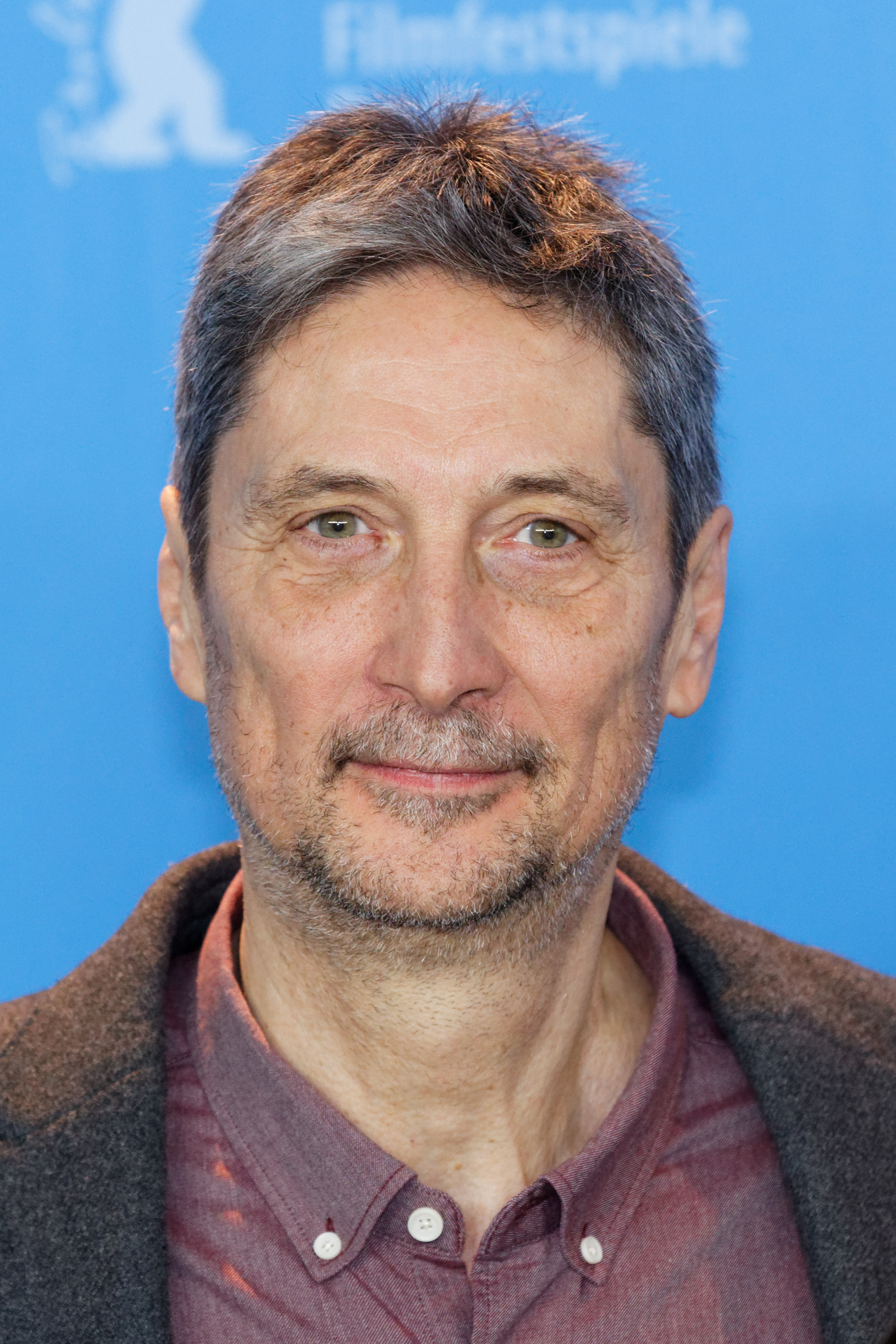
- Morcsányi at the Berlinale 2017
- Born: Géza Morcsányi; 28 August 1952; Budapest, Hungary
- Died: 4 January 2023 (aged 70); Budapest, Hungary
- Education: Corvinus University of Budapest
- Occupations: Actor; dramaturg; translator; professor
- Years active: 1986–20??
- Spouse: Judit Balog
- Children: 2

Géza Morcsányi (28 August 1952 – 4 January 2023) was a Hungarian actor, dramaturg, translator, and university professor. His debut film role was as Endre in the 2017 drama film On Body and Soul, the Hungarian entry for Best Foreign Language Film at the 90th Academy Awards. In 2005 he received the Order of Merit of the Republic of Hungary.

== Biography ==
Morcsányi was born in Budapest, Hungary on 28 August 1952.

Morcsányi began his career as a playwright in the 1986 television drama movie Kaméliás hölgy. As a script editor he worked on two films, the 2001 film Passport and the 2003 comedy drama film Hungarian Beauty. He participated in the presentation of Tibor Déry's work Az óriáscsecsemő (The Giant Baby) at the National Theatre of Pécs.

Morcsányi was the director of the Magvető publishing house from 1995 to 2015.

Morcsányi died on 4 January 2023, at the age of 70.
