= Zsuzsa Rakovszky =

Hungarian translator and writer (born 1950)

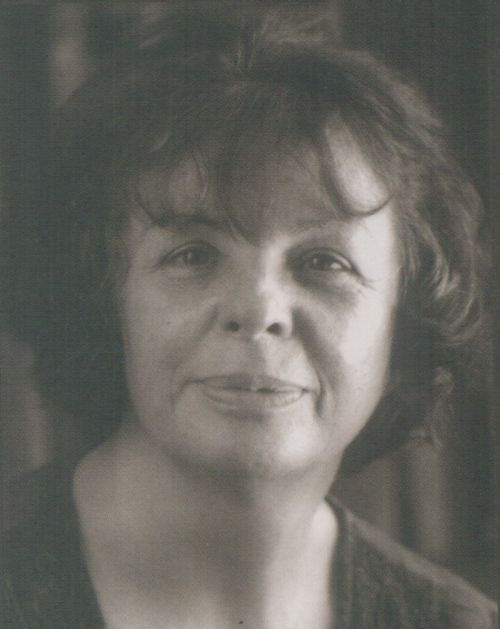
- Szilágyi Lenke felvétele
- Born: 4 December 1950
- Awards: honorary citizenship (Sopron, 2016)

Zsuzsa Rakovszky (born 4 December 1950) is a Hungarian translator and writer. Her surname also appears as Rakovsky.

She was born in Sopron and earned a teaching certificate in Hungarian and English from the School of English and American Studies of the Faculty of Humanities of the University of Budapest. From 1975 to 1981, she worked as a librarian. She published two poetry collections: Jóslatok és határidők (Prophecies and Deadlines) in 1981 and Tovább egy házzal (One house up) in 1987. Rakovszky received the Attila József Prize in 1987. She has won the Tibor Déry Prize and the (Robert) Graves Prize.

Rakovszky has translated works by a number of English and American poets into Hungarian.

== Selected works ==
- Fehér-fekete (white-black), poems (1991)
- Egyirányú utca (One way street), poems (1998)
