= Béla Vihar =

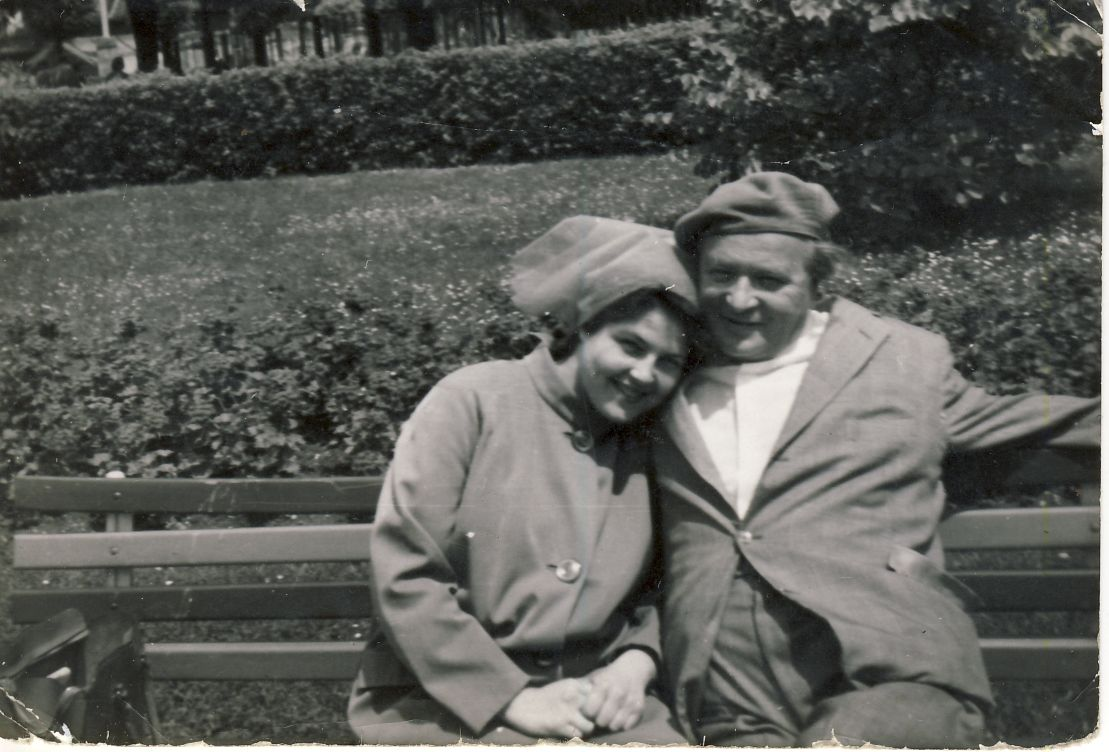
- Béla Vihar with his daughter, Judit Vihar in 1965
- Born: 23 May 1908; Hajdúnánás, Kingdom of Hungary
- Died: 24 November 1978 (aged 70); Budapest, Hungary
- Resting place: Kozma Street Cemetery
- Occupations: poet journalist writer teacher
- Spouse: Magda Widder (1915–2002)
- Children: Judit Vihar; Gábor Vihar (1948–1975)
- Writing career
- Language: Hungarian
- Period: 1924–1978
- Notable works: Yellow Book, Facts of the Wartime Sufferings of Hungarian Jewry
- Notable awards: Attila József Prize

Béla Vihar (Hungarian pronunciation: [ˈbeːlɒ ˈvihɒr]) (23 May 1908 – 24 November 1978), born Béla Weisz, was a Hungarian poet, journalist, writer and teacher. He is known for his book entitled "Yellow Book, Facts of the Wartime Sufferings of Hungarian Jewry" which was the first documentary book about The Holocaust in the world. His famous poem, "A Soldier walking in the snow" (Egy katona megy a hóban, translated by László Tehel) commemorates all the soldiers who lost their lives in war.

== Biography and career ==
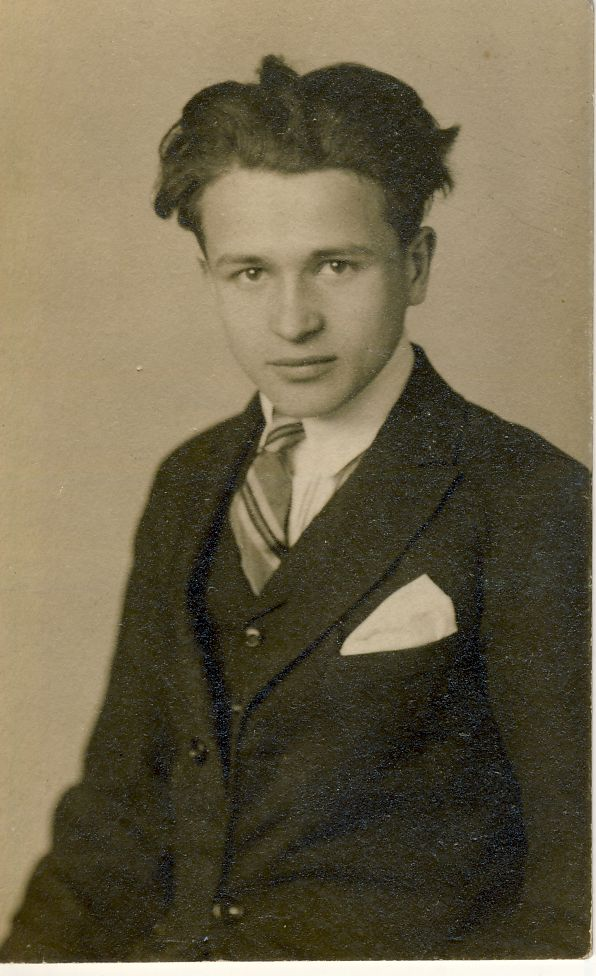
Young Poet

Béla Vihar was born on 23 May 1908 in Hajdúnánás. His parents were Samuel and Terez (nee Glucklich) Weisz, who would become Jewish victims of the Holocaust.

Béla married Magda Widder, the daughter of painter Félix Bódog Widder, and their daughter was Judit Vihar.

His poems were published in English, Bulgarian, Czech, French, Hebrew, Croatian, German, Italian, Russian, Romanian, Spanish and Slovak languages. In the 1970s his radio drama "Der Fremde. Hörspiel – Ballade" (The Stranger. Radio Drama – Ballad) was a great success in Germany.

We two, alone:
We are two at the birth.
We are two in love, lonely
at the time of death

== Awards and honors ==
- Attila József Prize – 1966

== Bibliography ==
- "Vihar Béla" (PDF) (in Hungarian). Kaláka.

== Selected works ==
=== Books ===
- Vihar, Béla (1945). Yellow Book, Facts of the Wartime Sufferings of Hungarian Jewry. São Paulo. Budapest: Hechaluc. Archived from the original on 14 February 2017.

=== Poems ===
- Út önmagadtól (1933)
- A szerelem születése (1958)
- Baráti asztal (1960)
- Önarckép 1962 (1962)
- A négy felelet (1965)
- Kígyóének (1970)
- Párbeszéd az idővel (1968)
- Küzdelem az angyallal (1973)
- Szamárháton (1976)
- Egy katona megy a hóban (1978)
- Az alkonyat kapujában (1980)
- Elröppent lakodalom (1984)
- Szíjak között (ed. Judit Vihar). Széphalom Könyvműhely, Budapest. 1998. (Disclosed: Among Phylacteries)
