= Judit Vihar =

Hungarian literary historian and Japanologist

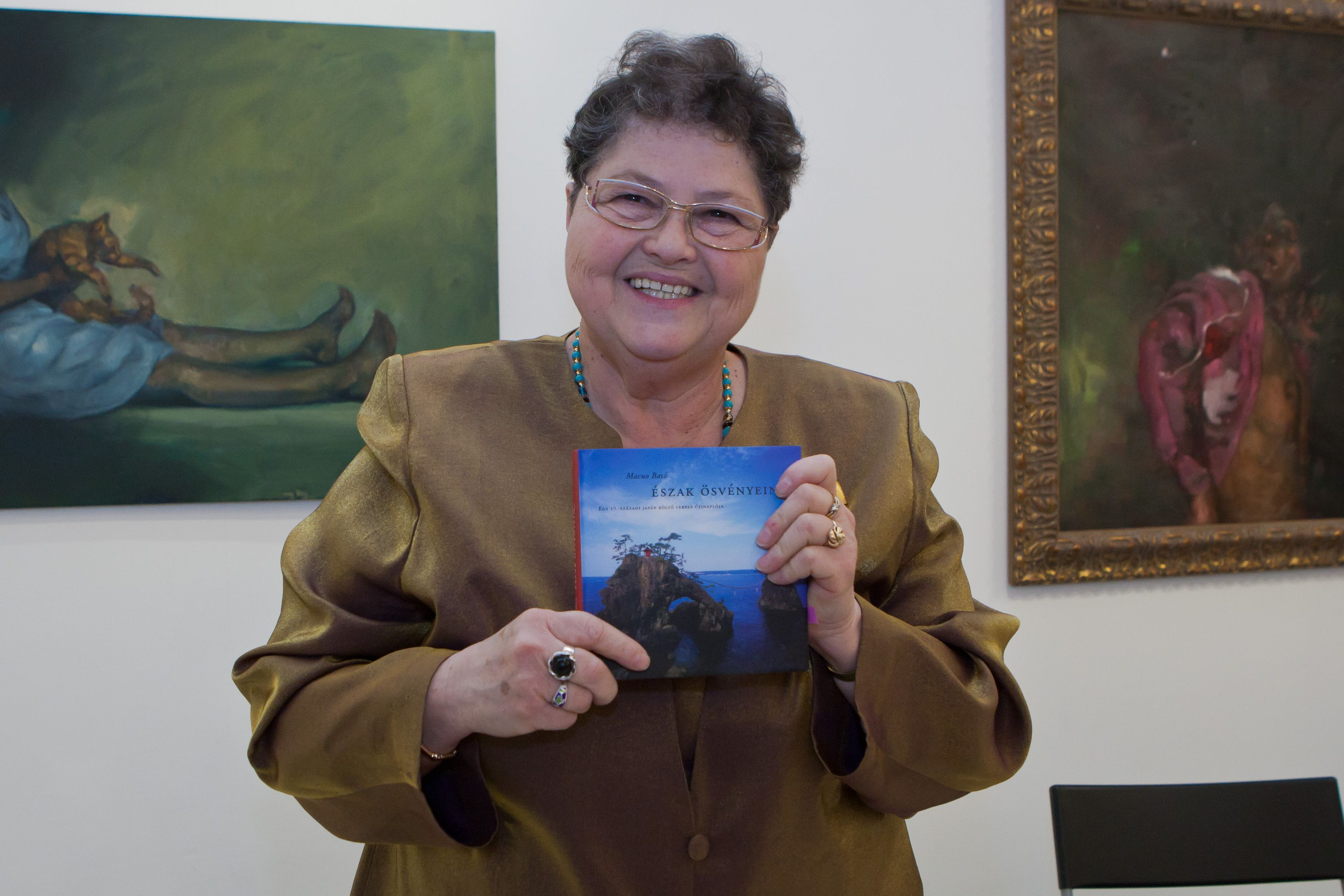
- Born: 28 August 1944 (age 82); Budapest, Hungary
- Citizenship: Hungarian
- Education: Eötvös Loránd University
- Known for: Japanese Modern Literature; Methodology of Foreign Language Teaching
- Awards: Order of the Rising Sun, 3rd Class, Gold Rays with Neck Ribbon (2009)
- Scientific career
- Fields: History of literature Translation
- Workplaces: Eötvös Loránd University; Károli Gáspár University of the Reformed Church in Hungary

Judit Vihar (Hungarian pronunciation: [ˈjudit ˈvihɒr]) (born 28 August 1944) is a Hungarian literary historian, Japanologist, professor emerita, translator, haiku poet and head of The Hungary–Japan Friendship Society. She has been active in the relationship between Japan and Hungary for decades. She is fluent in Hungarian, Japanese, Russian and Bulgarian.

== Biography and career ==
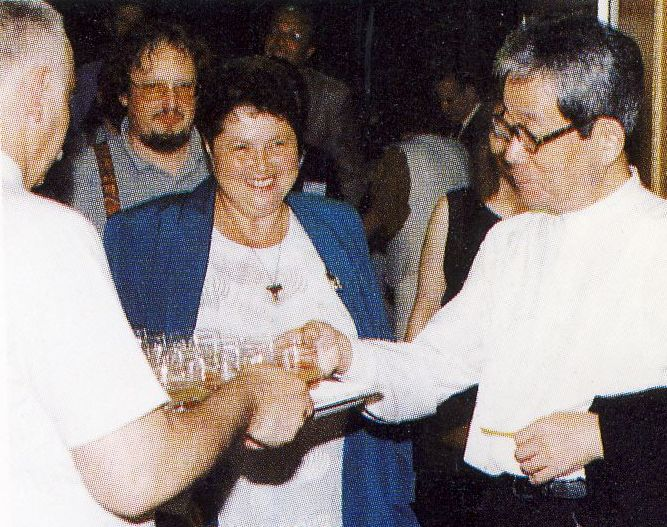
Nobel Prize laureate Kenzaburō Ōe and his Hungarian translator, Judit Vihar in 1997 in Budapest, Hungary

Judit Vihar was born on 28 August 1944 in Budapest. Her parents were poet Béla Vihar and Magda Widder, the daughter of painter Félix Bódog Widder. She took M. A. degrees at the Faculty of Humanities of the Eötvös Loránd University, Faculty of Arts in Hungarian, Russian Philology and Japanese in 1968. Since 1975 she has been teaching at Eötvös Loránd University and also at the Károli Gáspár University of the Reformed Church in Hungary since 1996. She has been the president of the Association of Japanese Studies and also of the Hungary-Japan Friendship Society since 2001. In 2002 she won 1st prize of the World Haiku Conference, the English language haiku competition in Japan. In 2009 she received Order of the Rising Sun, 3rd Class, Gold Rays with Neck Ribbon. She organized World Haiku Festival in Pécs, Hungary in 2010. She translated into Hungarian Nobel Prize laureate Kenzaburō Ōe’s novel, The Silent Cry.

In 2015 the first Japanese-Hungarian Dictionary was published and she was honored for her participation in that work by the Secretary for Foreign Affairs of Japan in 2016.

== Awards and honors ==
- Pro Universitate, Eötvös Loránd University – 2000
- Order of the Rising Sun, 3rd Class, Gold Rays with Neck Ribbon – 2009

== Bibliography ==
- "Vihar, Judit". Károli Gáspár University of the Reformed Church in Hungary. Archived from the original on 19 September 2016.

== Selected works ==
=== Papers ===
- The Spirit of Haiku. In: The Japanese Traditional Thought and the Present. Prague, February 1996. pp. 163–168.
- On the Northern of the Far East. Essay. World Haiku Review Volume 3. Issue1. March 2003. On the Northern of the Far East. Essay. World Haiku Review Volume 3. Issue1. March 2003.
- Haiku poetess from Hungary – Judit Vihar. Almanach GINKO. Sophia, 2006. 34.
- Ezer magyar haiku (Thousand Hungarian haiku), 2010.

=== Books ===
- A japán irodalom rövid története (A short history of Japanese Literature), 1994.
- Haiku poetry in Hungary. Románia, Constanza, 7. Haiku Fesztivál. Ovidius Egyetem, 2012.
- Preface. 序文. Prólogo. In: Sayumi Kamakura: Seven Sunsets. 七つの夕日. Siete atardeceres. Haiku collection. Allahabad, India, Cyberwitnet, 2013. pp. 4–14.

=== Ph.D. Thesis ===
- Archaism and dialect in translations of Mikszáth’s novels Issuing Institution, Eötvös Loránd University, 2001.
