= Géza Képes =

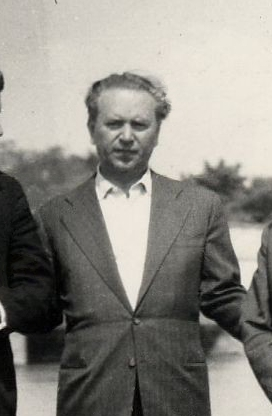
Géza Képes

Géza Képes (February 1, 1909 – August 19, 1989) was a Hungarian poet, translator and polyglot. He was born in Mátészalka and died in Budapest.
