= Erdélyi Napló =

Erdélyi Napló (“Transylvanian Journal”) is a Hungarian language right-wing weekly published in Cluj-Napoca, and distributed regionally throughout Transylvania.
