= Iszkáz =

- Location of Veszprém county in Hungary

- Location of Iszkáz
- Coordinates: 47.16932°N 17.29602°E
- Country: Hungary
- Region: Central Transdanubia
- County: Veszprém
- District: Devecser

Area
  - Total: 15.74 km^{2} (6.08 sq mi)

Population (2004)
  - Total: 400
  - Density: 25.41/km^{2} (65.8/sq mi)
- Time zone: UTC+1 (CET)
  - Summer (DST): UTC+2 (CEST)
- Postal code: 8493
- Area code: 88

Iszkáz is a village in the Devecser District of Veszprém County, Hungary.

== Notable figure ==
- István Ágh (1938–2025), poet, born István Nagy in Iszkáz
