= János Zách =

Hungarian actor

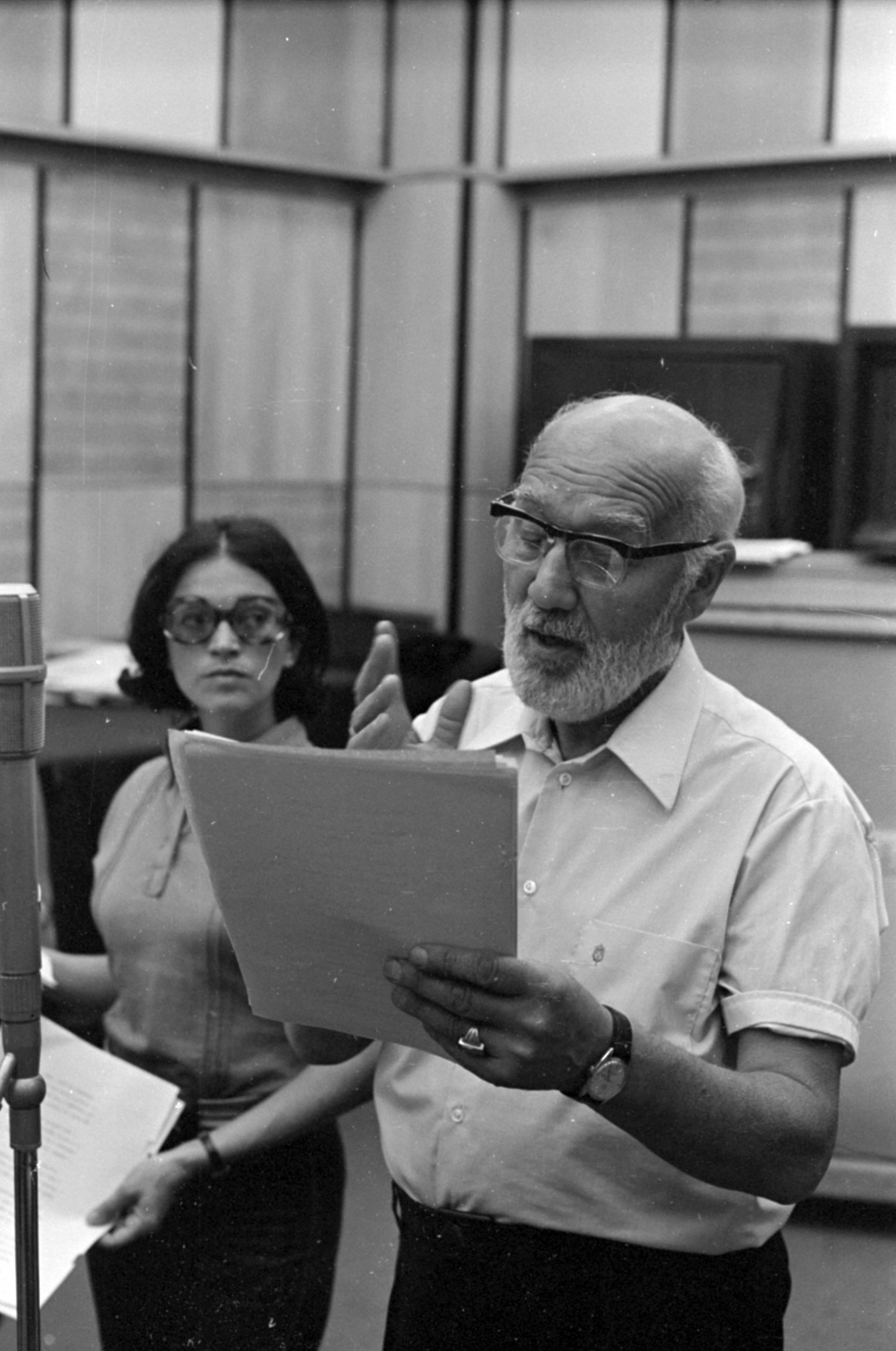
- Zách in 1974 with Franciska Győry.
- Born: 11 February 1909; Budapest, Austro-Hungarian Empire
- Died: 24 October 1979 (aged 70); Budapest, Hungary
- Occupation: Actor
- Years active: 1948–1979 (film & TV)

János Zách (1909–1979) was a Hungarian stage, film and television actor and theatre director.

== Selected filmography ==
- Tüz (1948)
- Hot Fields (1949)
- The Marriage of Katalin Kis (1950)
- Full Steam Ahead (1951)
- A Strange Marriage (1951)
- Try and Win (1952)
- West Zone (1952)
- Erkel (1952)
- The Smugglers (1958)
- Édes Anna (1958)
- The Bells Have Gone to Rome (1959)
- Crime at Dawn (1960)
- Drama of the Lark (1963)
- Zöldár (1965)
- And Then The Guy... (1966)
- Utószezon (1967)
- Hekus lettem (1972)

== Bibliography ==
- Cunningham, John. Hungarian Cinema: From Coffee House to Multiplex. Wallflower Press, 2004.
- Gergely, Gábor & Hayward, Susan. The Routledge Companion to European Cinema. Routledge, 2021.
- Székely, György & Gajdó, Tamás. Magyar színháztörténet: 1920-1949. Akadémiai Kiadó, 1990.
