= The Moneymaker (film) =

1964 film

- Directed by: Frigyes Bán
- Written by: Lajos Tolnai (novel); Imre Bencsik
- Produced by: György Sívó
- Starring: Sándor Pécsi; Itala Békés; Hilda Gobbi
- Cinematography: Ottó Forgács
- Edited by: Mária Daróczy
- Music by: Szabolcs Fényes
- Production company: Mafilm
- Release date: 16 April 1964
- Running time: 88 minutes
- Country: Hungary
- Language: Hungarian

The Moneymaker (Hungarian: A pénzcsináló) is a 1964 Hungarian comedy film directed by Frigyes Bán and starring Sándor Pécsi, Itala Békés and Hilda Gobbi. It was shot at the Hunnia Studios in Budapest and on location around Sopron. The film's sets were designed by the art director Lóránt Kézdi.

== Cast ==
- Sándor Pécsi as Bányai Péter
- Itala Békés as Lina, Bányai felesége
- Hilda Gobbi as özvegy Hagymássyné
- István Egri as Mikola, titkosrendõr
- Zoltán Greguss as Fõkapitány
- László Ungváry as gróf Kerényi
- Hédi Temessy as Kerényiné
- Sándor Deák as Fõpolgármester
- Siegfried Brachfeld as Riedl, államtitkár
- László Kemény as Nemere de Genere
- László Márkus as Nemere Ubul
- Frigyes Bán as Ferenc József
- Cecília Esztergályos as Bányai Sárika
- Sándor Tompa as Miller
- Pál Somogyvári as Fogalmazó
- Géza Szigeti as Fogalmazó
- István Nagy as Simon Márk, fûszeres
- László Bánhidi as Sintér
- Sándor Pethes as Horoghy Dániel
- Antal Farkas as Bodnár Gazsi
- József Horváth as Gyontató pap
- Rudolf Romhányi as Ügyvéd úr
- László Ferencz as Ügyvéd
- János Horkay as Börtön igazgató
- György Gozmány as Földbirtokos
- Ildikó Pádua as Vendéglõsné
- Gellért Raksányi as Rikkancs
- László Misoga as Inas
- Jutka Saródy as Bányai Zsófika
- Iván Verebély as Fõhadnagy

== Bibliography ==
- Balski, Grzegorz . Directory of Eastern European Film-makers and Films 1945-1991. Flicks Books, 1992.
- Rîpeanu, Bujor. (ed.) International Directory of Cinematographers, Set- and Costume Designers in Film: Hungary (from the beginnings to 1988). Saur, 1981.
