= Age of Illusions =

- Film poster
- Directed by: István Szabó
- Written by: István Szabó
- Starring: András Bálint; Ilona Béres
- Release date: 11 February 1965
- Running time: 1h 35min
- Country: Hungary
- Language: Hungarian

Age of Illusions (Hungarian: Álmodozások kora) is a 1965 Hungarian drama film directed by István Szabó. It was his first feature film as a director.

== Cast ==
- András Bálint - Jancsi
- Ilona Béres - Halk Éva
- Judit Halász - Habgab
- Kati Sólyom - Anni
- Cecília Esztergályos - Ági
- Béla Asztalos - Laci
- Tamás Eröss - Matyi
- László Murányi - Gergely
- István Dékány - Füsi
- István Bujtor - Ági fiúja
- Klára Falvay -
- Miklós Gábor - Flesch
