= Car Crazy =

1965 film

- Directed by: Frigyes Bán
- Written by: Imre Bencsik
- Produced by: György Sívó
- Starring: Sándor Pécsi; Imre Sinkovits; Tamás Major
- Cinematography: Barnabás Hegyi
- Edited by: Sándor Zákonyi
- Music by: András Bágya
- Production company: Mafilm
- Release date: 25 February 1965
- Running time: 73 minutes
- Country: Hungary
- Language: Hungarian

Car Crazy (Hungarian: Kár a benzinért) is a 1965 Hungarian musical comedy film directed by Frigyes Bán and starring Sándor Pécsi, Imre Sinkovits and Tamás Major. It was shot at the Hunnia Studios in Budapest and on location around Lake Balaton and the resort town of Lillafüred. The film's sets were designed by the art director László Duba.

== Cast ==
- Sándor Pécsi as Balogh Imre
- Imre Sinkovits as Gál
- Dezsö Garas as Zalai
- Tamás Major as Igazgató
- János Horkay as Gépkocsi eladója
- Alfonzó as Polacsek
- Itala Békés as Szomszéd
- Mari Szemes as Baloghné
- Márta Fónay as Szomszéd
- Zsuzsa Csala as Szomszéd
- Zoltán Basilides as Szomszéd
- Ildikó Sólyom as Gálné
- Antal Farkas as Teherautó soför
- Ferenc Kállai as Tengõdi
- Éva Vass as Paál Gabi
- Sándor Suka as Vizsgabiztos
- Gábor Kiss as Rendõr
- László Bánhidi as Boldizsár
- Endre Csonka as Taxis
- László Keleti as Utas
- Béla Kollár as Rendõr
- Miklós Zoltai as Taxis
- Ervin Kibédi as Narrátor
- László Misoga

== Bibliography ==
- Balski, Grzegorz . Directory of Eastern European Film-makers and Films 1945-1991. Flicks Books, 1992.
- Rîpeanu, Bujor. (ed.) International Directory of Cinematographers, Set- and Costume Designers in Film: Hungary (from the beginnings to 1988). Saur, 1981.
