= Treasured Earth =

1948 film

- Talpalatnyi föld
- Directed by: Frigyes Bán
- Screenplay by: Pál Szabó; Sándor Dallos
- Based on: Talpalatnyi föld by Pál Szabó
- Produced by: Jenő Katona
- Starring: Ági Mészáros; Ádám Szirtes; Tibor Molnár; László Bánhidi
- Cinematography: Árpád Makay
- Edited by: Félix Máriássy
- Music by: Sándor Veress
- Production company: Magyar Filmgyártó Nemzeti Vállalat
- Release date: 23 December 1948
- Running time: 97 minutes
- Country: Hungary
- Language: Hungarian

Treasured Earth (Hungarian: Talpalatnyi föld) is a 1948 Hungarian drama film directed by Frigyes Bán and starring Ági Mészáros, Ádám Szirtes and Tibor Molnár. It is based on a novel by Pál Szabó. It is also known by the alternative title The Soil Under Your Feet. István Szőts was originalled intended to be the director, but the film was taken away from him after his Song of the Cornfields was criticised by the country's Communist leadership. It was followed by a sequel The Land Is Ours in 1951. The film was chosen to be part of the Budapest Twelve, a list of Hungarian films considered the best in 1968.

== Cast ==
- Ági Mészáros as Marika Juhos
- Ádám Szirtes as Jóska Góz
- Tibor Molnár as Jani Tarcali
- Árpád Lehotay as Mihály Zsíros Tóth
- Mariska Vízváry as aunt Zsíros
- István Egri as Ferke Zsíros Tóth
- László Bánhidi as András Szilasi

== Bibliography ==
- Buranbaeva, Oksana & Mladineo, Vanja. Culture and Customs of Hungary. ABC-CLIO, 2011.
- Cunningham, John. Hungarian Cinema: From Coffee House to Multiplex. Wallflower Press, 2004.
