= Dreams of Love – Liszt =

- Directed by: Márton Keleti
- Written by: Daniil Del
- Starring: Imre Sinkovits; Ariadna Shengelaya; Sándor Pécsi; Klara Luchko; Igor Dmitriev
- Cinematography: István Hildebrand
- Edited by: Mihály Morell
- Music by: Franz Liszt; Ferenc Farkas
- Production companies: MAFILM; Lenfilm
- Distributed by: Ellman Film Enterprises (USA)
- Release date: 1970
- Running time: 174 minutes
- Countries: Hungary; Soviet Union
- Languages: Hungarian; English; German; French; Russian

Dreams of Love – Liszt (Hungarian: Szerelmi álmok – Liszt, also known in English as The Loves of Liszt) is a Hungarian-Soviet epic musical/drama produced and directed by Márton Keleti, based on the biography of the Hungarian composer and pianist Franz Liszt.

While the movie was criticized for some of its historical inaccuracies, its epic scope and intense scenes of virtuoso musical performances won wide praise and has been credited with affecting the cultural landscape of the 1970s Eastern Europe.

== Plot summary ==
An epic film about the Hungarian virtuoso pianist and composer Franz Liszt. He is an international star giving performances all over Europe and goes on a concert tour to St. Petersburg, Russia. Liszt's brilliant piano playing impressed the Russian royalty and aristocracy. Even the Russian Tsar stops talking when Liszt plays his piano. Liszt becomes a friend of the Russian composer Glinka. Liszt's beautiful music touches everyone's heart. Women are pursuing him and his lengthy affair with countess Marie d'Agoult is in trouble.

In Russia, Liszt meets the beautiful Princess Carolyne, they fall in love, and she soon leaves her husband for Liszt. She becomes a muse and inspiration for Liszt, and his last and strongest love. Inspired by his love for Carolyne, Liszt creates the most beautiful romantic piano composition, "Liebestraum" (also known as "Dream of Love") dedicated to her, and the piece becomes a classic hit. But the church does not allow Liszt to marry Carolyne, because she could not terminate her first marriage. The unmarried couple moves to the city of Weimar, where Liszt becomes the music director for the royal orchestra. This becomes the most productive and happy period in Liszt's life.

The pianist and composer Franz Liszt becomes a superstar. He tours many countries and makes people happy with his music, although his love life is in trouble. Carolyne cannot terminate her marriage while her husband is alive. Her relatives are against Liszt. She and Liszt remain unmarried, and Liszt suffers from emotional pain until the end of his life. Being loved by the public, Liszt is never really happy in his personal life, so he expresses himself through music.

== Cast ==
- Imre Sinkovits as Franz Liszt
- Ariadna Shengelaya as Carolyne zu Sayn-Wittgenstein
- Sándor Pécsi as Gaetano Belloni, Liszt's secretary
- Klara Luchko as Marie d'Agoult
- Igor Dmitriev as prince Nikolay Petrovich Wittgenstein
- Larisa Trembovelskaya as Lola Montez
- Tamás Major as Pope Pius IX
- Klári Tolnay as Cosima, Liszt's daughter
- Lajos Básti as Ágoston Trefort
- Ferenc Bessenyei as Mihály Vörösmarty
- Ádám Szirtes as Miska, Liszt's servant
- Petr Shelokhonov as Mikhail Glinka, Russian composer
- Sándor Suka as Joseph Haydn, Austrian composer
- Natalya Baytalskaya as Vera Timanova
- Gennady Bednostin
- Irina Gubanova as Olga Yanina
- Tibor Bitskey as Liszt's friend
- Kornél Gelley as priest
- Peter Huszti as Franz Joseph I of Austria
- Sergei Ivanov as Nicholas I of Russia
- György Kálmán as police officer
- Sergei Karnovich-Valua as Charles Frederick, Grand Duke of Saxe-Weimar-Eisenach
- Zsolt Kocsy as Franz Liszt in his childhood
- Ivan Kolejev
- Valentin Kulik as Sigismond Thalberg
- Vasili Leonov as Alexander Borodin
- Gábor Mádi Szabó as Liszt's father
- Vera Szemere as Liszt's mother
- László Márkus as Miklós Esterházy
- Sergei Polezhayev as courtier
- Emmanuil Schwarzberg
- Anatoli Shvedersky as Gustav Adolf, Cardinal Prince of Hohenlohe-Schillinsgfürst
- Bertalan Solti
- Géza Tordy as Carl Czerny
- Marina Yurasova as Grand Duchess Maria Pavlovna of Russia
- Éva Ruttkai (voice dubbing for the character of Carolyne in the Hungarian version)
- Ildikó Pécsi (voice dubbing for the character of Lola Montez in the Hungarian version)
- Zsuzsa Bánki (voice dubbing for the character of Marie d’Agoult in the Hungarian version)
- Zoltán Latinovits (voice dubbing for the character of Nikolay Petrovich Wittgenstein in the Hungarian version)
- Katalin Gyöngyössy (voice dubbing for the character of Olga Janina in the Hungarian version)
- József Simándy – singer of Hungarian Coronation Mass
- Svjatoslav Richter – (player of piano pieces of Chopin, Beethoven, Czerny; archive recordings)
- György Cziffra – (player of piano pieces of Liszt; studio recordings)

== Production ==
- This is a joint Hungarian-Soviet production of MAFILM Studio 3 and Lenfilm Studio.
- Production dates: 1968–1970.
- Filmed in the Soviet Union, East Germany and Hungary.
- Liszt's historic performance in Russia was filmed at St. Petersburg Bolshoi Philharmonic Hall.
- Sviatoslav Richter plays piano for the character of Liszt, including études and the famous "Liebestraum".
- The Hungarian version runtime is 174 minutes.
- The Soviet version is reduced down to 150 minutes, with some scenes deleted.
- The American version is reduced to 130 minutes, with many scenes deleted.
- Released in 1970 in Hungary and the Soviet Union.
- Released on September 29, 1972, in Finland, and in December 1975, in the USA.
