= The Golden Head =

1964 film by Richard Thorpe, James Hill

- Directed by: Richard Thorpe; James Hill
- Written by: Iván Boldizsár; Stanley Goulder; Roger Windle Pilkington
- Produced by: Alexander Paal; William R. Forman
- Starring: George Sanders; Buddy Hackett; Jess Conrad; Lorraine Power
- Cinematography: István Hildebrand
- Edited by: Frank Clarke
- Music by: Szabolcs Fényes
- Production companies: Hunnia Filmstúdió; Metro Goldwyn Mayer
- Distributed by: Hungarofilm; Metro Goldwyn Mayer
- Release date: 10 December 1964
- Running time: 105 minutes (Hungary)
- Countries: United States; Hungary
- Languages: English; Hungarian

The Golden Head is a 1964 American-Hungarian comedy film directed by Richard Thorpe and James Hill and starring George Sanders, Buddy Hackett, Jess Conrad, Lorraine Power and Robert Coote.

== Plot ==
Michael Stevenson, the famous English crime expert, travels to Hungary for an international crime conference, where he also takes his family. While he is at the conference, his family members visit cities along their route. In the meantime, the priceless golden head of St. Ladislaus is stolen, and suspicion turns to the Stevenson children. The children embark on an investigation to prove their innocence.

== Cast ==
- George Sanders as Basil Palmer
- Buddy Hackett as Lionel Pack
- Jess Conrad as Michael Stevenson
- Lorraine Power as Milly Stevenson
- Robert Coote as Braithwaite
- Denis Gilmore as Harold Stevenson
- Cecília Esztergályos as Anne
- Douglas Wilmer as Detective Inspector Stevenson
- Sándor Pécsi as Priest
- Zoltán Makláry as Old Man

== Production ==
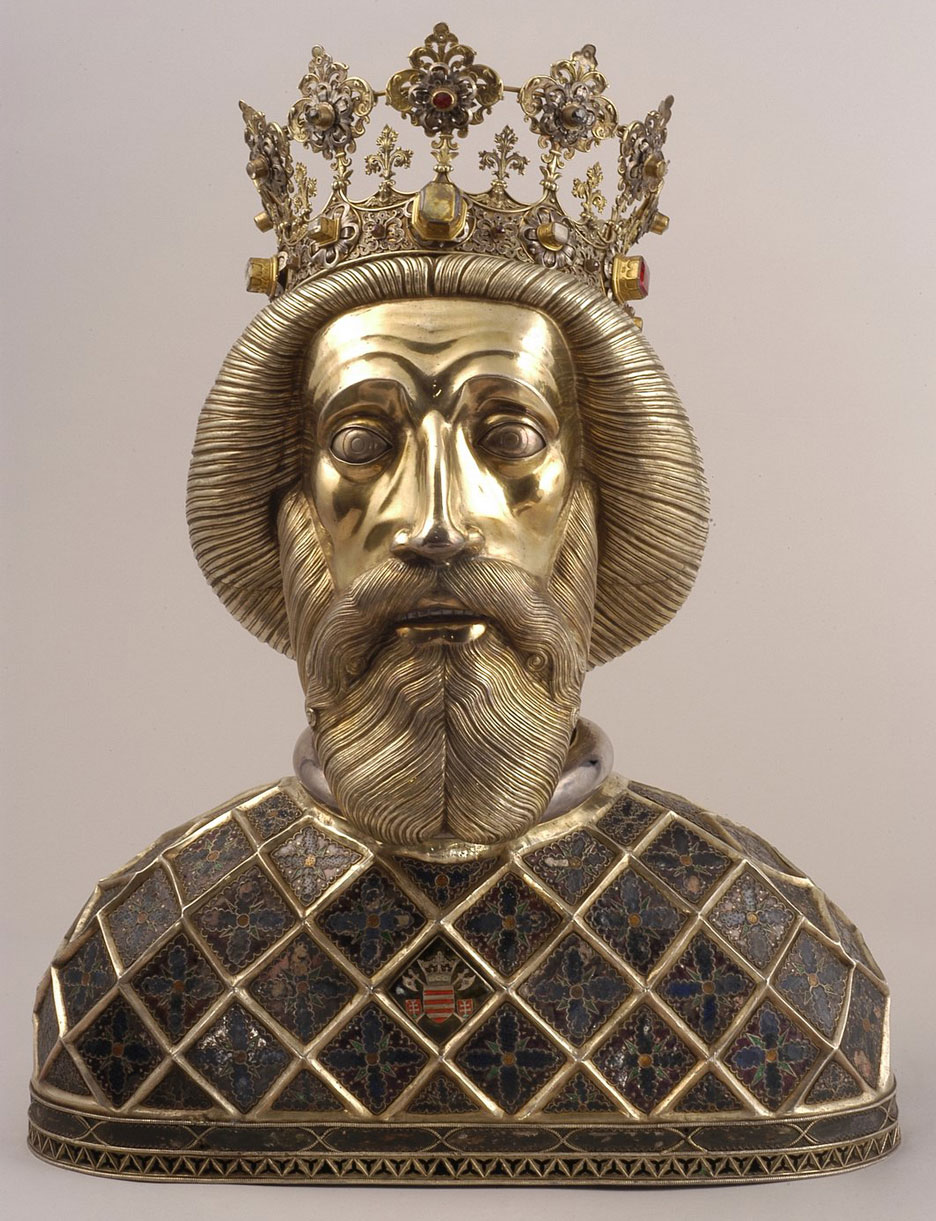
Referred to in the film as St. Lazlo, the golden herm of King St. Ladislaus is a Hungarian national treasure

Its Hungarian title is Az aranyfej. It was shot on location in Hungary in the Super Technirama 70 process, and was loosely based on the novel Nepomuk of the River by Roger Windle Pilkington. Lionel Jeffries and Hayley Mills were originally attached to the project. James Hill was the original director, but was replaced by Richard Thorpe during shooting.

== Home media ==
The Golden Head was released in 2019 by Flicker Alley in a Region 1/A dual DVD/Blu-ray edition. It is presented in "Smilebox" format, simulating the original cinema showings on wide Cinerama screens.
