= Loving Hearts =

1944 film

- Directed by: István Balogh; Dezső Ákos Hamza; Zoltán Kerényi; Emil Martonffi; Emil M. Szuchy; István Szöts
- Written by: Miklós Asztalos; Géza Matolay
- Starring: László Szilassy
- Cinematography: István Berendik; Jenõ Dulovits; Ferenc Fekete; Árpád Makay
- Music by: Gyula Balázs; Zoltán Kodály
- Production companies: Lippay Film; Magyar Film Iroda
- Release date: 20 July 1944
- Country: Hungary
- Language: Hungarian

Loving Hearts (Hungarian: Szerelmes szívek) is a 1944 Hungarian romance film consisting of directed by István Balogh, Dezső Ákos Hamza, Zoltán Kerényi, Emil Martonffi, Emil M. Szuchy and István Szöts each of whom directed one of six individual episodes in an anthology.

== Partial cast ==
- Bea Goll as Chopin kedvese
- Gyula Benkö as Chopin
- Jenö Danis as Párizsi házmester
- László Szilassy as Lavotta, a fogadós fia
- Lili Kertay as Lisette, a hercegnõ
- Karola Zala as Lisette nagynénje
- Gusztáv Pártos as Fogadós
- Bella Bordy as Katica
- Sándor Pethes as Bûvész
- Marcsa Simon as Nagyanyó
- Lajos Rajczy as Erõmûvész

== Bibliography ==
- Cunningham, John. Hungarian Cinema: From Coffee House to Multiplex. Wallflower Press, 2004.
- Juhász, István. Kincses magyar filmtár 1931-1944: az eredeti forgatókönyvből 1931 és 1944 között létrejött hazai mozgóképekről. Kráter, 2007.
- Rîpeanu, Bujor. (ed.) International Directory of Cinematographers, Set- and Costume Designers in Film: Hungary (from the beginnings to 1988). Saur, 1981.
