= Ernö Mihályi =

Hungarian actor (1905–1949)

Ernő Mihályi
- Born: 16 July 1905; Budapest, Austria-Hungary
- Died: 7 March 1949 (aged 43); Budapest, Hungary
- Occupation: Actor
- Years active: 1936–1944 (film)

Ernő Mihályi (16 July 1905 – 7 March 1949) was a Hungarian stage and film actor. A character actor known for his comedy roles, he appeared frequently in supporting roles in films of the Horthy era.

== Selected filmography ==
- Tomi (1936)
- Haunting Spirit (1940)
- One Night in Transylvania (1940)
- Háry János (1941)
- Cadet Love (1942)
- The Perfect Family (1942)
- Happy Times (1943)
- The Marsh Flower (1943)
- Disillusion (1943)
- Dream Waltz (1943)
- Sári bíró (1943)
- Kerek Ferkó (1943)
- Black Dawn (1943)
- Szerencsés flótás (1943)
- I Dreamed of You (1943)
- The Three Doves (1944)
- Knock on the Window (1944)
- I'll Make You Happy (1944)
- Makkhetes (1944)
- Half a Boy (1944)

== Bibliography ==
- Juhász, István. Kincses magyar filmtár 1931-1944: az eredeti forgatókönyvből 1931 és 1944 között létrejött hazai mozgóképekről. Kráter, 2007.
