= Mickey Magnate =

1949 film

- Directed by: Márton Keleti
- Written by: Károly Bakonyi (play); Andor Gábor (play); István Békeffy
- Starring: Miklós Gábor; Ági Mészáros; Marika Németh; János Sárdy
- Cinematography: István Eiben
- Edited by: Sándor Zákonyi
- Music by: Albert Szirmai; Szabolcs Fényes (recasts)
- Production company: Magyar Filmgyártó Nemzeti Vállalat
- Release date: 10 January 1949
- Running time: 95 minutes
- Country: Hungary
- Language: Hungarian

Mickey Magnate (Hungarian: Mágnás Miska) is a 1949 Hungarian comedy film directed by Márton Keleti and starring Miklós Gábor, Ági Mészáros and Marika Németh. It was based on a popular stage musical comedy by Károly Bakoni and Andor Gábor which had previously been adapted on screen in the 1916 silent film Miska the Magnate, directed by Alexander Korda.

The film was described as "the most successful ever Hungarian light comedy film".

== Main cast ==
- Miklós Gábor as Miska
- Ági Mészáros as Marcsa
- Marika Németh as Rolla
- János Sárdy as Baracs Pista, mérnök
- Kálmán Latabár as Pixi
- Árpád Latabár as Mixi
- Mária Sulyok as Korláthyné grófnõ
- Hilda Gobbi as Nagymama
- László Kemény as Korláthy gróf
- Árpád Lehotay as Id. Baracs
- Sándor Pécsi as Biró
- Sándor Pethes as Eleméry gróf
- John Bartha as One of the servants

== Bibliography ==
- Kulik, Karol. Alexander Korda: The Man Who Could Work Miracles. Virgin Books, 1990.
