= Hédi Temessy =

Hungarian actress (1925–2001)

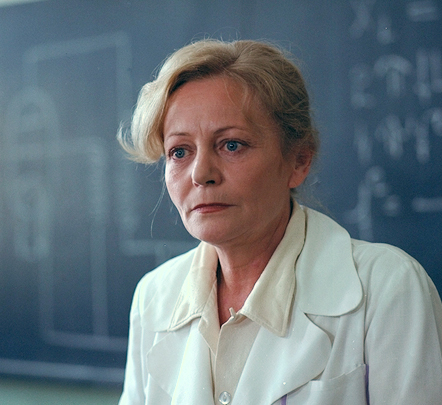
- Temessy in the film Ballagás (1980)
- Born: Hedvig Temesi; 6 May 1925; Budapest, Hungary
- Died: 29 May 2001 (aged 76); Budapest, Hungary
- Occupation: Actress
- Years active: 1948–2001
- Partner: Hilda Gobbi

Hédi Temessy (Hedvig Temesi; 6 May 1925 – 29 May 2001) was a Hungarian actress. Active for over 50 years, she appeared on stage, in films, and on television. Her significant roles include playing Márta in Gergely Csiky's The Grandmother (A nagymama).

== Early life ==
Hedvig Temesi was born on 6 May 1925, in Budapest. Her mother was originally from Alsace-Lorraine and her maternal grandfather was a master iron worker, who had immigrated to France from Graz. As a child, she learned German from her mother. After completing her education at the State Teacher Training Institute, she enrolled in the National Actors' School in Budapest just before the start of World War II. Three months before completing her training, Temesi refused to take the compulsory political courses, as her teaching certificate confirmed she had already successfully passed examination on those subjects and she wanted to take more practical courses. The school dropped her from the roles, but Márton Rátkai was able to intervene and get her accepted to a school directed by the Actors Association, from which she graduated in 1948.

== Career ==
In 1950, Temessy became a member of the Youth Theater and then played at Petőfi Theater. Between 1950 and 1977, she worked at a variety of theaters, including the Jókai Theater, the József Attila Theater, National Theater and the Thália Theater, among others. Because of her skill with German language, the fact that she was not a member of the Communist Party, and was a divorced, single mother, raising her son alone, Temessy was often fired from jobs as a suspicious enemy of the state, but her skill always allowed her to find theater work, even if she could not work in film.

Her first film role was as Mary Döry in the film Különös házasság (Strange Marriage, 1951), based on a novel by Kálmán Mikszáth of the same name. Three years would lapse before her next film, Rokonok (Relatives, 1954), directed by director Félix Máriássy. From the mid-1960, with a shift in the country's political climate, she began to attain roles in such film and television shows as Sellő a pecsétgyűrűn (Seller on Seal Ring, 1966), Egri csillagok (Stars of Eger, 1968), and Imposztorok (Impostors, 1969). In 1977, she was finally allowed to join the Hungarian Film Company Company, and increasingly from the 1970s, she found work with a new generation of directors who did not care about her private history.

Some of her most known stage roles include: Timea in Mór Jókai′s Az arany ember (The Golden Man); Márta in Gergely Csiky′s A nagymama (The Grandmother); Madelaine Béjart in Mikhail Bulgakov′s Az álszentek összeesküvése (The Conspiracy of Hypocrites); and Clara Zachanassian in Friedrich Dürrenmatt′s Az öreg hölgy látogatása (A Visit of the Old Lady). In 1985, she was awarded the social jury award for Best Female Actress by the Hungarian Feature Film Review for her portrayal in Őszi almanach (Autumn Almanac, 1984), directed by Béla Tarr. In 1995 she was awarded the Officer's Cross of the Order of Merit of the Republic of Hungary

== Relationships ==
After Temessy divorced her husband, she began a relationship with actress Hilda Gobbi and they lived together from the late 1950s to 1960s in a home in Buda. Homosexuality was no longer a crime after 1961 but was classified as a mental illness. After Gobbi and Temessy ended their relationship, Gobbi became the partner of the writer Erzsébet Galgóczi.

== Selected filmography ==
- A Strange Marriage (1951) - Mária, Dõry lánya
- Relatives (1954) - Magdaléna
- Springtime in Budapest (1955)
- Egy pikoló világos (1955)
- Dani (1957)
- Sleepless Years (1959) - Lisszauerné
- Légy jó mindhalálig (1960)
- The Moneymaker (1964) - Kerényiné
- Másfél millió (1964)
- Utószezon (1967) - Péter anyja
- Sellö a pecsétgyürün I (1967) - Endrõdi Noémi
- Sellö a pecsétgyürün II (1967) - Endrõdy Noémi
- Egri csillagok (1968)
- Sziget a szárazföldön (1969) - Lakáscserélõ
- Imposztorok (1969) - Az Admirális neje
- Történelmi magánügyek (1970) - Nagy Mária
- Hatholdas rózsakert (1970) - Angyalka anyja
- Hangyaboly (1971) - Evelina
- Emberrablás magyar módra (1972) - Titkárnõ
- A magyar ugaron (1973) - Fábián anyja
- Lányarcok tükörben (1973) - Vendég a presszóban
- Tüzoltó utca 25. (1973)
- Football of the Good Old Days (1973) - Cserépkalapos nõ
- Itt járt Mátyás király (1973) - Szilágyi Erzsébet
- Ereszd el a szakállamat! (1975) - Lépoldné
- Autó (1975) - Lili anyja
- A Strange Role (1976) - Ágota kisasszony
- Man Without a Name (1976) - Énekesnõ
- Két pont között a legrövidebb görbe (1976) - Koós kapitány felesége
- Tükörképek (1976) - Bakosné, ápolt
- A kard (1977) - Muzeológus
- Pókfoci (1977) - Igazgatóhelyettes
- Just Like Home (1978) - Klára asszony
- BUÉK! (1978) - Kati nevelöanyja
- Áramütés (1979) - Rendésznö
- Mese habbal (1979) - Titkárnõ
- Ajándék ez a nap (1979) - Irén apjának korábbi partnere
- Veszélyes játékok (1980) - Schneider édesanyja
- Majd holnap (1980) - Márta néni
- Csontváry (1980) - Guest woman #1
- Boldog születésnapot, Marilyn! (1981) - Billy mamája
- Mephisto (1981) - Egy nagybankos neje
- Ballagás (1981) - Ybl Manci, fizikatanár
- Ripacsok (1981) - Róza
- The Vulture (1982) - Halmosné,Roska Mária
- Do not Panic, Major Kardos (1982) - Alexné
- Nyom nélkül (1982) - Idõs hölgy
- Talpra, Gyözö! (1983) - Ildikó, a nagymama
- Szerencsés Dániel (1983) - Mrs. Bakos
- The Revolt of Job (1983) - Róza, Jób felesége
- Bástyasétány hetvennégy (1984) - Elvira, jósnõ
- Almanac of Fall (1984) - Hédi
- Yerma (1984) - Magdalena
- The Red Countess (1985) - Gróf Andrássy Gyuláné
- Keserü igazság (1986)
- Akli Miklós (1986) - Szilvássyné
- Elysium (1986) - Zelma (voice)
- Vakvilágban (1987) - Károly anyja
- Laura (1987) - Berta
- Miss Arizona (1987) - (voice)
- Damnation (1988) - Cloakroom woman
- Soha, sehol, senkinek! (1988) - Nagymama
- Laurin (1989) - Olga
- Sweet Emma, Dear Böbe (1992) - Mária néni
- A skorpió megeszi az ikreket reggelire (1992) - Ella
- A csalás gyönyöre (1992)
- Kutyabaj (1992)
- Gyerekgyilkosságok (1993) - Szepessyné
- A gólyák mindig visszatérnek (1993) - Nagymama
- Indián tél (1993) - A Tanár úr felesége
- Köd (1994) - Hauserstück néni
- A Brooklyni testvér (1995)
- Európa messze van (1995) - Az állomásmester felesége
- Szeressük egymást, gyerekek! (1996) - macskanõ (segment "Ég a város, ég a ház is / Fire! Fire!)
- Levelek Perzsiából (1996) - Nagymama
- A világ legkisebb alapítványa (1997) - Countess Zsófi
- For My Baby (1997) - Martha Orgelbrand
- Film... (2000)
- Anarchisták (2001) - Fanni
- Hamvadó cigarettavég (2001) - (final film role)

== Awards ==
- 1941 Farkas–Ratkó Prize
- 1949 Kossuth Prize
- 1950 Republic of Hungary award for deserving artist (A Magyar Köztársaság Érdemes Művésze díj)
- 1955 Republic of Hungary award for outstanding artist (A Magyar Köztársaság Kiváló Művésze díj)
- 1977 SZOT prize
- 1982 Worthy Artist
- 1995 Officer of Order of Merit of the Republic of Hungary

== Bibliography ==
- Gábor, Agárdi (4 November 2014). "A szép szavak szerelmese" [Loving the beautiful words] (in Hungarian). Subotica, Serbia: Hét Nap. Archived from the original on 20 June 2017.
- Székely, György; Török, Margit (1994). "Magyar színházművészeti lexikon: Temessy Hédi; Temesi Hedvig" [Hungarian Theater Arts Lexicon: Hédi Temessy; Hedvig Temesi]. mek.oszk.hu (in Hungarian). Budapest, Hungary: Academy Publishing House and the National Theater History Museum by Akadémiai Kiadó. Archived from the original on 5 March 2016.
- Tamás, Rita (7 June 2014). "Úriemberként viselkedett női szeretőivel Gobbi Hilda" [Hilda Gobbi was a gentleman with his female lover] (in Hungarian). Budapest, Hungary: BorsOnline. Archived from the original on 15 June 2017.
- "Gobbi Hilda". Hangosfilm (in Hungarian). Budapest, Hungary: Magyar Hangosfilm Lexikon. 1982. Archived from the original on 3 April 2016.
- "Temessy Hédi". Szineszkonyvtar.hu (in Hungarian). Budapest, Hungary: NAS Informatikai Kft. 2003. Archived from the original on 14 August 2016.
