= The Football Star =

1957 film

- Directed by: Márton Keleti
- Written by: Tibor Méray
- Produced by: József Golda
- Starring: Kamill Feleki; László Ungváry; Manyi Kiss
- Cinematography: István Pásztor
- Edited by: Sándor Zákonyi
- Music by: Tamás Bródy
- Production company: Hunnia Filmgyár
- Release date: 12 September 1957
- Running time: 92 minutes
- Country: Hungary
- Language: Hungarian

The Football Star (Hungarian: A csodacsatár) is a 1957 Hungarian sports comedy film directed by Márton Keleti and starring Imre Pongracz as the football star, Kamill Feleki, László Ungváry and Manyi Kiss. It features a number of cameos from Ferenc Puskás and other footballers of the Hungarian national Golden Team, who had finished as runners-up at the 1954 World Cup. It was shot at the Hunnia Studios in Budapest. The film's sets were designed by the art director Zoltán Fülöp.

== Main cast ==
- Kamill Feleki as Brunó
- László Ungváry as Admiral Duca
- Imre Pongrácz as Jóska, the star player
- Lajos Mányai as Caprain Venturo
- Manyi Kiss as Aurélia
- Imre Sinkovits as Riporter
- Éva Schubert as Estella
- Tivadar Horváth as Filippo
- Gábor Rajnay as the president
- Gyula Gózon as the prime minister
- Zoltán Makláry as the barber
- János Makláry as a shoeshiner
- Ferenc Puskás as Himself
- John Bartha as soccer player

After Puskás defected to Spain following the Hungarian Revolution of 1956, his role was re-shot with Nándor Hidegkuti; both versions of the film were eventually released.

== Bibliography ==
- Balski, Grzegorz . Directory of Eastern European Film-makers and Films 1945-1991. Flicks Books, 1992.
- Cunningham, John. Hungarian Cinema: From Coffee House to Multiplex. Wallflower Press, 2004.
- Rîpeanu, Bujor. (ed.) International Directory of Cinematographers, Set- and Costume Designers in Film: Hungary (from the beginnings to 1988). Saur, 1981.
