= Erkel (film) =

1952 film

- Directed by: Márton Keleti
- Written by: István Békeffy; Gábor Thurzó
- Produced by: Mrs. Miklós Vitéz
- Starring: Sándor Pécsi; Éva Szörényi; Miklós Gábor
- Cinematography: István Eiben
- Edited by: Sándor Zákonyi
- Music by: Jenő Kenessey
- Production company: Mafilm
- Release date: 3 August 1952
- Running time: 126 minutes
- Country: Hungary
- Language: Hungarian

Erkel is a 1952 Hungarian historical drama film directed by Márton Keleti and starring Sándor Pécsi, Éva Szörényi and Miklós Gábor. It is based on the life of the nineteenth century Hungarian composer Ferenc Erkel. It was shot at the Hunnia Studios in Budapest. The film's sets were designed by the art director Zoltán Fábri. It was screened at the 1952 Karlovy Vary International Film Festival.

== Cast ==
- Sándor Pécsi as Erkel Ferenc
- Éva Szörényi as Adél, wife of Erkel
- Miklós Gábor as Egressy Béni
- Andor Ajtay as Bartai András
- György Solthy as Adler
- Margit Makay as Mrs. Adler
- Iván Darvas as Liszt Ferenc
- Jenõ Horváth as Petõfi Sándor
- Tamás Major as Kölcsey Ferenc
- Gábor Rajnay as Rózsahegyi Márk
- János Zách as Brand-Mosonyi Mihály
- Sándor Szabó as Petrichevich Horváth Lázár
- Zoltán Várkonyi as Turányi, general music director
- Lajos Mányai as baron Orczy, intendant
- Tivadar Uray as Albrecht fõherceg
- József Bihari as old serf
- Gyula Tapolczay as aristocrat
- László Kemény as old archduke

== Bibliography ==
- Balski, Grzegorz . Directory of Eastern European Film-makers and Films 1945–1991. Flicks Books, 1992.
- Mitchell, Charles P. The Great Composers Portrayed on Film, 1913 through 2002. McFarland, 2004.
- Ostrowska, Dorota, Pitassio, Francesco & Varga, Zsuzsanna. Popular Cinemas in East Central Europe: Film Cultures and Histories. Bloomsbury Publishing, 2017
