= Sándor Pécsi =

Hungarian actor

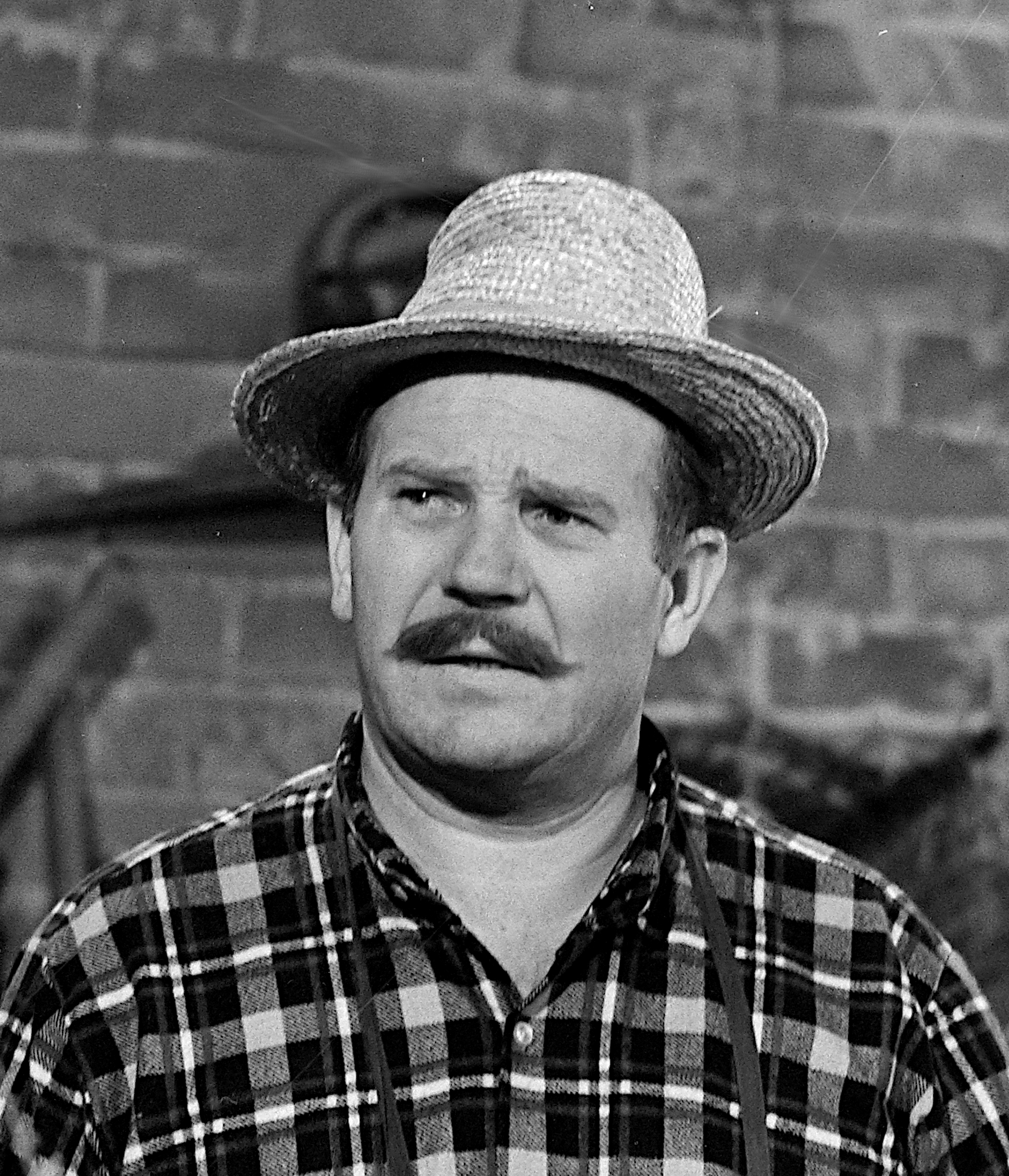
- Born: 18 March 1922; Sajószentpéter, Hungary
- Died: 4 November 1972 (aged 50); Budapest, Hungary
- Occupation: Actor
- Years active: 1948–1972

Sándor Pécsi (18 March 1922 – 4 November 1972) was a Hungarian actor born in Sajószentpéter, Hungary. He appeared in more than 60 films between 1948 and 1972 before dying on 4 November 1972 in Budapest, Hungary.

== Selected filmography ==
- Talpalatnyi föld (1948)
- Mickey Magnate (1949) – Biró
- A Woman Gets a Start (1949) – Szekeres
- Szabóné (1949) – Hódis
- Úri muri (1950) – Pincér
- The Marriage of Katalin Kis (1950) – Barna
- A Strange Marriage (1951) – Medve Ignác, doktor
- The Land Is Ours (1951) – Jámbor Lajos
- West Zone (1952) – Forgács
- Erkel (1952) – Erkel Ferenc
- Young Hearts (1953) – Dani Sándor
- The Sea Has Risen (1953) – Nyári Pál
- Under the City (1953) – Varga
- Simon Menyhért születése (1954) – Bonta
- Relatives (1954) – Kardics
- Liliomfi (1955) – Szellemfi
- Love Travels by Coach (1955) – Farkas Gyõzõ professzor
- Dandin György, avagy a megcsúfolt férj (1955) – Dandin György
- Sunday Romance (1957) – Bodrogi
- St. Peter's Umbrella (1958) – Bélyi János, plébános
- Yesterday (1959) – Fekete õrnagy
- The Bells Have Gone to Rome (1959) – Angel úr
- Kard és kocka (1959) – Varga Máté kocsmáros
- Szerelem csütörtök (1959) – Máró
- A Husband for Susy (1960) – Egy másik papa, aki szintén szeretné
- Az arc nélküli város (1960) – Vedres Pál százados
- Young Noszty and Mary Toth (1960) – Pázmár dr.
- Az ígéret földje (1961) – Bakonyi
- Megszállottak (1962) – Kútfúró mester
- Egyiptomi történet (1963) – Hajóskapitány
- Félúton (1963) – Limpár Kálmán
- Tücsök (1963) – Virág
- Hogy állunk, fiatalember? (1963) – Fáraó, tanár
- Germinal (1963) – Maheu
- Párbeszéd (1963) – Safrankó Mihály
- Új Gilgames (1964) – Aradi doktor
- The Moneymaker (1964) – Bányai Péter
- Lady-Killer in Trouble (1964) – Kovács Péter rendörörnagy
- The Golden Head (1964) – Priest
- Car Crazy (1965) – Balogh Imre
- Nem (1965) – Író
- Tilos a szerelem (1965) – Dani
- Az orvos halála (1966) – Tanácstitkár
- Aranysárkány (1966) – Liszner – zöldséges
- Sellö a pecsétgyürün I (1967) – Salgó Oszkár
- Sellö a pecsétgyürün II (1967) – Salgó Oszkár
- Baleset (1967) – Traps
- Kártyavár (1968) – Hajóskapitány
- A hamis Izabella (1968) – Lovass Dezsõ
- The Boys of Paul Street (1968) – Rácz tanár úr
- Hazai pálya (1969) – Virág, tanácselnök
- Az örökös (1969) – Párttitkár
- Utazás a koponyám körül (1970) – Tibor, fõpincér
- Szerelmi álmok – Liszt (1970) – Belloni
- Hahó, Öcsi! (1971) – Határõr
- Fuss, hogy utolérjenek! (1972) – Tokaji Gáspár, számlaellenõr
- Harminckét nevem volt (1972) – Forrai
