= Ági Mészáros =

Hungarian actress (1914–1989)

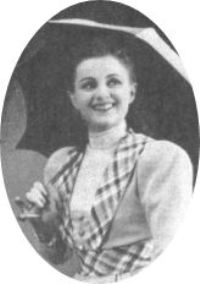
- Born: Ágnes Éberli; 24 May 1914; Budapest, Austria-Hungary
- Died: 8 March 1989 (aged 74); Budapest, Hungary
- Occupation: Actress
- Years active: 1940–1977

Ági Mészáros (born Ágnes Éberli; 24 May 1914 – 8 March 1989) was a Hungarian film actress. She appeared in 27 films between 1940 and 1977. She was a two time recipient of the Kossuth Prize. Her daughter Ági Voith is also an actress.

== Selected filmography ==
- On the Way Home (1940)
- Treasured Earth (1948)
- Mickey Magnate (1949)
- The Marriage of Katalin Kis (1950)
- The Land Is Ours (1951)
- Kiskrajcár (1953)
- The Bridge of Life (1956)
- Twenty Hours (1965)
- Budapest Tales (1976)
