= Éva Kelemen (actress) =

Hungarian actress (1921–1986)

- Born: 22 March 1921; Újpest, Hungary
- Died: 24 April 1986 (aged 65); Budapest, Hungary
- Occupation: Actress
- Years active: 1942–1984 (film and TV)

Éva Kelemen (22 March 1921 – 24 April 1986) was a Hungarian stage, film and television actress. She was married to the actor György Gozmány whom she starred with in several films including the 1944 comedy Midnight Waltz. She was a member of the Madách Theatre in Budapest from 1951 until her death.

== Selected filmography ==
- Katyi (1942)
- Sári bíró (1943)
- The Night Serenade (1943)
- Half a Boy (1944)
- The Three Doves (1944)
- Knock on the Window (1944)
- Midnight Waltz (1944)
- Baptism of Fire (1952)
- The Sea Has Risen (1953)
- Me and My Grandfather (1954)

== Bibliography ==
- Laura, Ernesto G. Tutti i film di Venezia, 1932–1984. La Biennale, Settore cinema e spettacolo televisivo, 1985.
- Székely, György & Gajdó, Tamás. Magyar színháztörténet: 1920-1949. Akadémiai Kiadó, 1990.
