= Sándor Zákonyi =

Hungarian film editor (1915–1981)

- Born: 17 March 1915; Budapest, Austro-Hungarian Empire
- Died: 23 August 1981 (aged 66); Budapest, Hungary
- Occupations: Film Editor, Director
- Years active: 1938–1976 (film & TV)

Sándor Zákonyi (1915–1981) was a Hungarian film editor. He also worked as an assistant director and directed the 1944 comedy film Midnight Waltz. He was particularly active during the post-Second World War years, at a time when Hungarian film production had fallen to low levels.

== Selected filmography ==
- Dream Waltz (1943)
- The White Train (1943)
- Midnight Waltz (1944)
- The Schoolmistress (1945)
- The Siege of Beszterce (1948)
- Janika (1949)
- Mickey Magnate (1949)
- A Woman Gets a Start (1949)
- Singing Makes Life Beautiful (1950)
- A Strange Marriage (1951)
- Erkel (1952)
- Try and Win (1952)
- The State Department Store (1953)
- Rakoczy's Lieutenant (1954)
- Accident (1955)
- The Bridge of Life (1956)
- The Football Star (1957)
- Two Confessions (1957)
- What a Night! (1958)
- Up the Slope (1959)
- Sunshine on the Ice (1961)
- Land of Angels (1962)
- Car Crazy (1965)
- The Testament of Aga Koppanyi (1967)

== Bibliography ==
- Cowie, Peter & Elley, Derek. World Filmography: 1967. Fairleigh Dickinson University Press, 1977.
- Cunningham, John. The Cinema of Istvan Szabo: Visions of Europe. Columbia University Press, 2014.
