= László Ungváry =

Hungarian actor

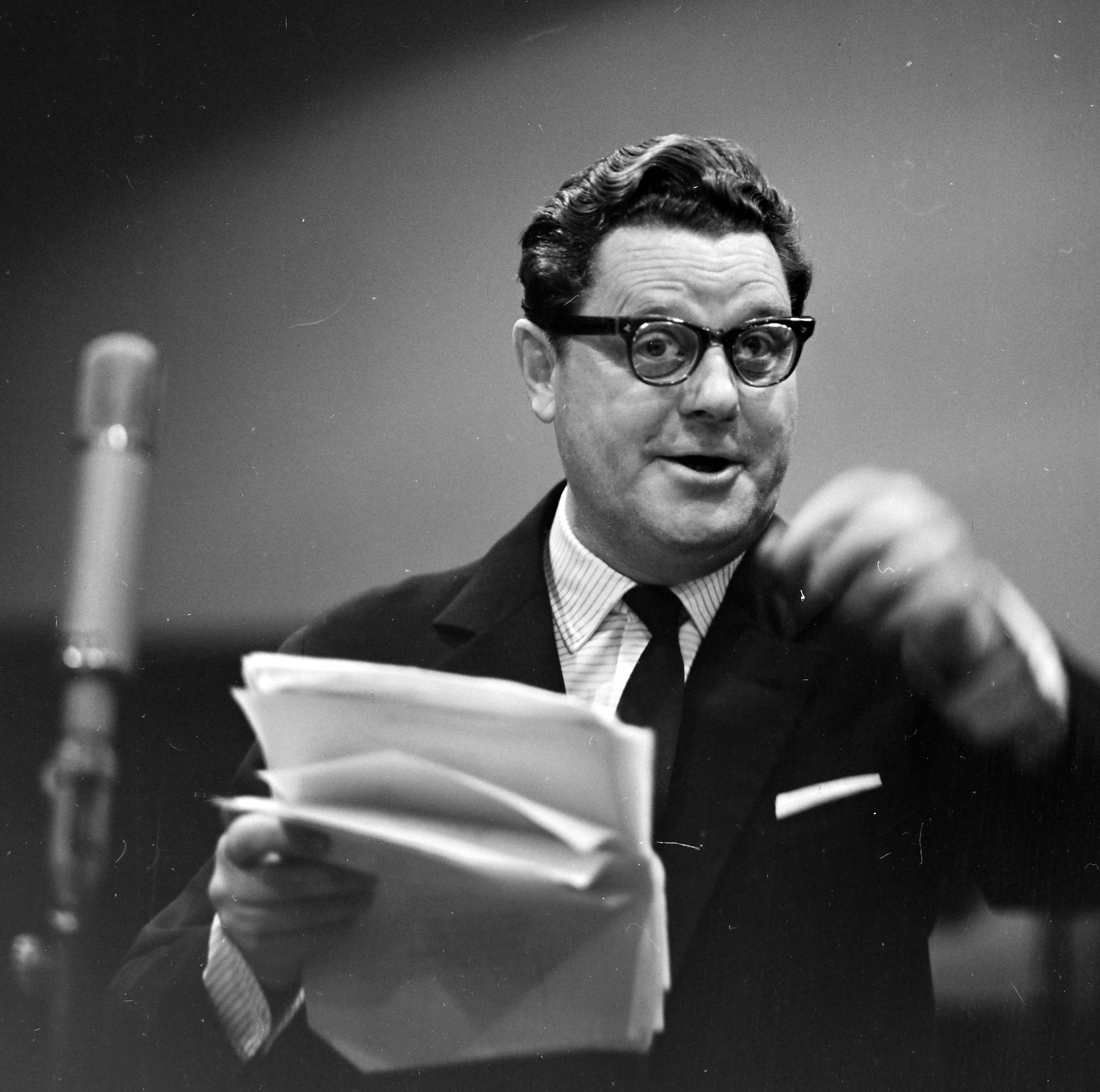
- Ungváry in 1961
- Born: 8 December 1911; Budapest, Austro-Hungarian Empire
- Died: 21 September 1982 (aged 70); Budapest, Hungary
- Occupation: Actor
- Years active: 1935–1982 (film & TV)

László Ungváry (1911–1982) was a Hungarian film, stage and television actor.

== Selected filmography ==
- Varjú a toronyórán (1938)
- Férjet keresek (1940)
- Europe Doesn't Answer (1941)
- The Song of Rákóczi (1943)
- Madách: Egy ember tragédiája (1947)
- A Strange Marriage (1951)
- Semmelweis (1952)
- Relatives 1954)
- The Football Star (1957)
- A Quiet Home (1958)
- Yesterday (1959)
- The Moneymaker (1964)
- The Corporal and the Others (1965)

== Bibliography ==
- Fekete, Márton. Prominent Hungarians: Home and Abroad. Szepsi Csombor Literary Circle, 1979.
- Nicoll, Allardyce. Shakespeare Then Till Now. Cambridge University Press, 1969.
