= Imre Sinkovits =

Hungarian actor

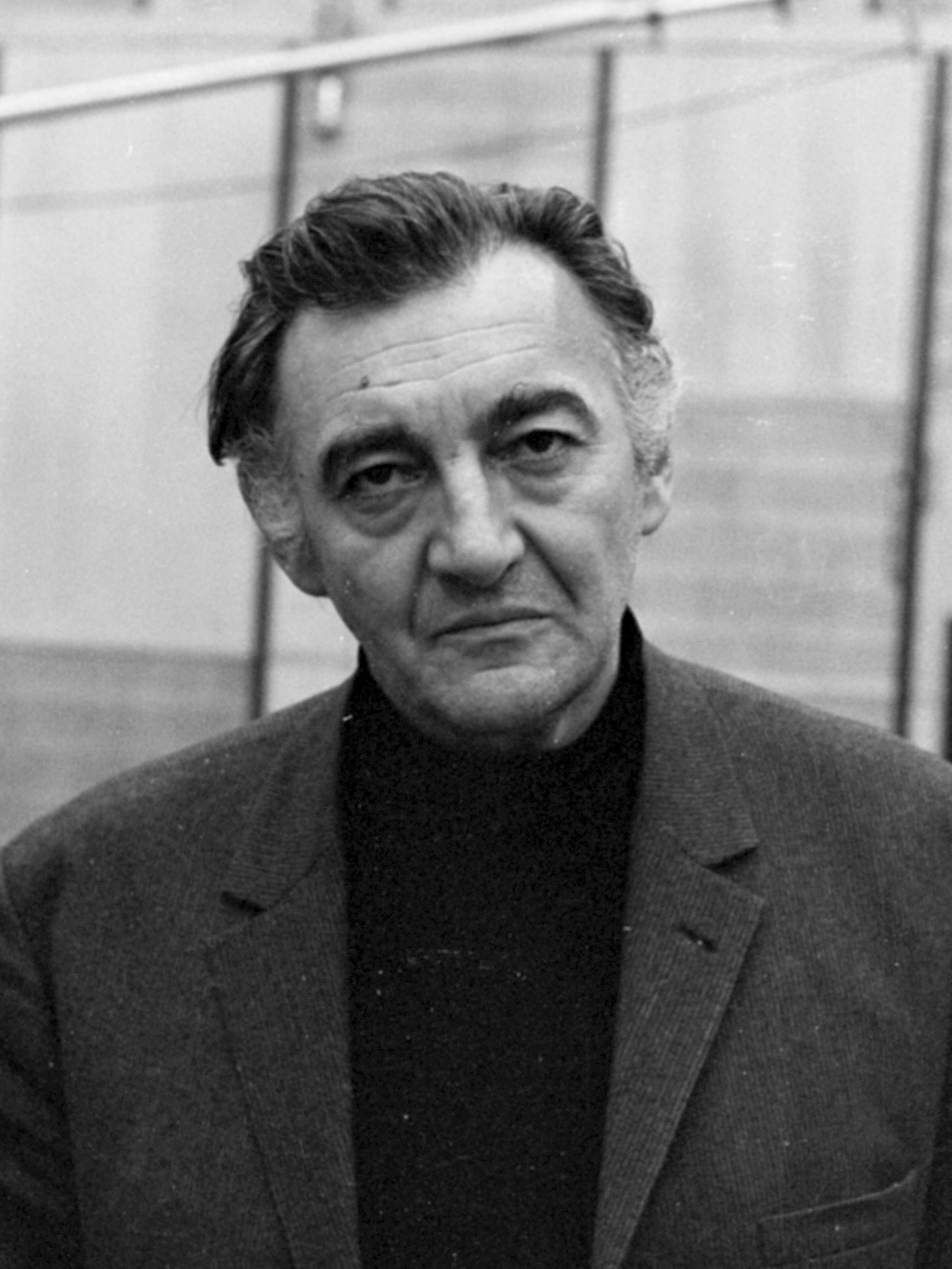
- Sinkovits in 1973
- Born: 21 September 1928; Budapest, Kingdom of Hungary
- Died: 18 January 2001 (aged 72); Budapest, Hungary
- Education: Academy of Drama and Film in Budapest
- Occupation: Actor

Imre Sinkovits (21 September 1928 in Budapest – 18 January 2001 in Budapest) was a Hungarian actor.

== Career ==
After a year in Downtown Theatre and another in Youth Theatre, in 1949 he got a job in National Theatre, where he stayed until 1956. His breakthrough role was Imre Madách's Moses, which he had played for 22 years, more than 700 times. On 23 October 1956 he recited Sándor Petőfi's Nemzeti dal at the Petőfi Square in Budapest in front of a crowd of 20,000 people. This was the opening act of a youth protest, which protest in a few hours became a nationwide revolt against the government. Sinkovits became a member of the Hungarian Theatre and Film Association Revolutionary Committee on 30 October. After the revolution was crushed, Sinkovits was banned from acting for a half year for his activities, and his membership in the National Theatre was terminated. Between 1958 and 1963, he worked in the Attila József Theatre. In 1963 he returned to the National Theatre and he became one of its dominant actors for decades. He played the leading role in a number of films and television series, and was also involved in dubbing and narration. At 4 May 1991 reburial ceremony of Jozsef Cardinal Mindszenty in Esztergom, Sinkovits delivered a powerful rendition of Hungarian poet Mihály Vörösmarty's poem Szózat before the 50,000 mourners in attendance. Szózat is considered to be a second national anthem of Hungary. In 2022, on the anniversary of his birthday, a star was named after him.

== Personal life ==
In 1951, Sinkovits married Hungarian actress Katalin Gombos (b. 12 February 1929 Hódmezővásárhely; died 6 November 2012 Budapest). They had two children: Andrew Sinkovits-Vitay and Mariann Sinkovits, both of whom also became actors. Sinkovits and Gombos are buried in the Óbuda cemetery.

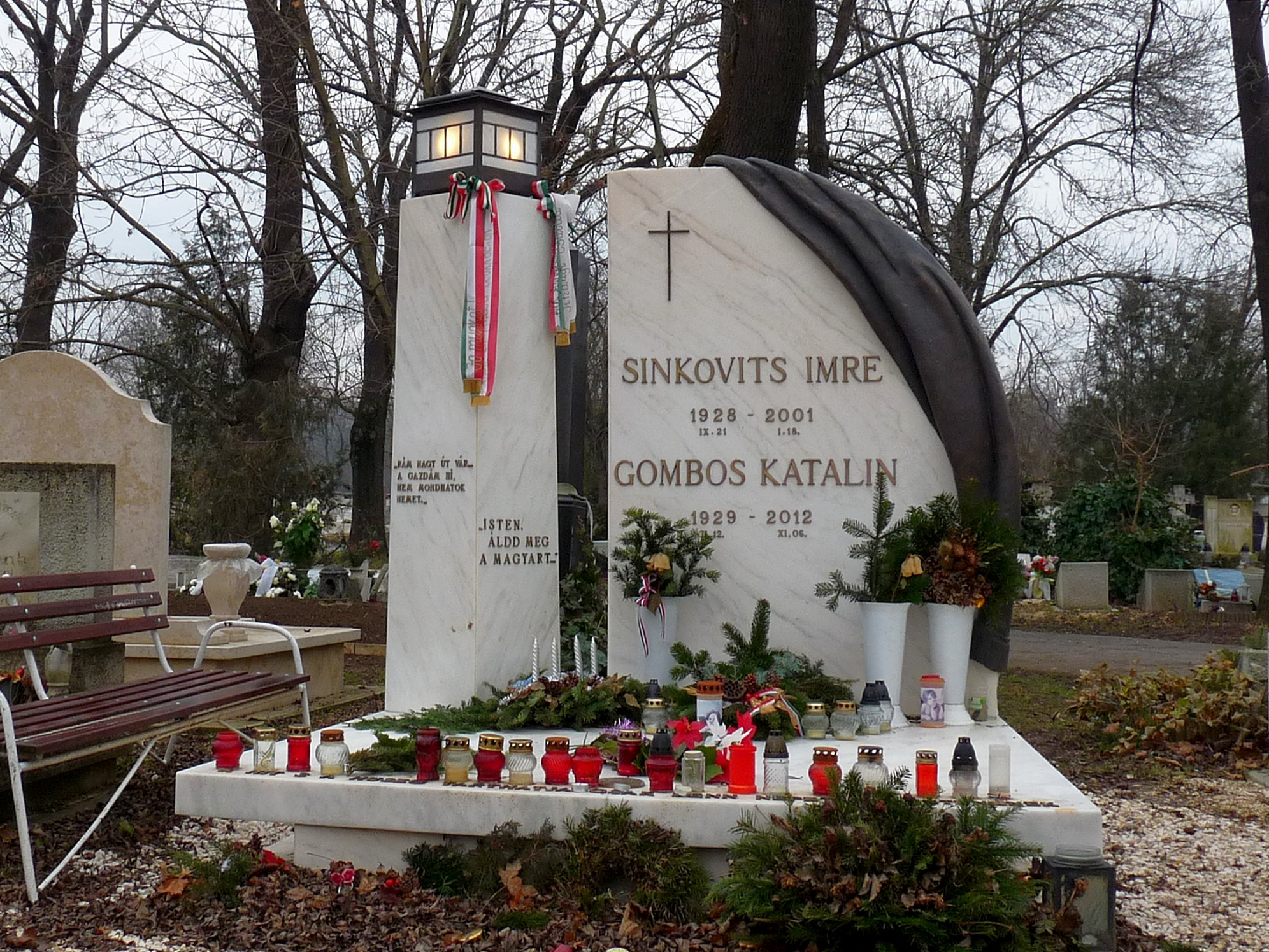
Sinkovits's & Gombos's grave in Óbuda cemetery

== Selected filmography ==
- Full Steam Ahead (1951)
- Storm (1952)
- Fourteen Lives (1954)
- Love Travels by Coach (1955)
- A Strange Mask of Identity (1955)
- Leila and Gábor (1956)
- The Football Star (1957)
- Suburban Legend (1957)
- Alba Regia (1961)
- Tales of a Long Journey (1963)
- The Corporal and the Others (1965)
- Car Crazy (1965)
- And Then The Guy... (1966)
- Three Nights of Love (1967)
- Stars of Eger (1968)
- The Toth Family (1969)
- Franz Liszt. Dreams of love (Ференц Лист) (1970) - as Franz Liszt

== Awards ==
- Kossuth Prize (1966)
- Mari Jászai Award (1955, 1962)
- Kazinczy Award (1983)
- Order of Merit of the Republic of Hungary, Commander's cross with star, civilian (hu:A Magyar Köztársasági Érdemrend középkeresztje a csillaggal, 1998)
- Hungarian Heritage Award (hu:Magyar Örökség díj, 1996)
- National Actor title (hu:A Nemzet Színésze, 2000)
