= Midnight Waltz (film) =

1944 film

- Directed by: Sándor Zákonyi
- Produced by: György Bakos
- Starring: Éva Kelemen; Ilona Kökény; Zoltán Makláry
- Cinematography: Rudolf Icsey
- Edited by: János Gordán
- Music by: Dezsõ Losonczy
- Production company: Klim-Bakos Produkció
- Release date: 1944
- Country: Hungary
- Language: Hungarian

Midnight Waltz (Hungarian: Éjféli keringö) is a 1944 Hungarian comedy film directed by Sándor Zákonyi and starring Éva Kelemen, Ilona Kökény and Zoltán Makláry. It was shot at the Hunnia Studios in Budapest. The film's sets were designed by the art director János Pagonyi.

== Cast ==
- Éva Kelemen as Éva, énekesnõ
- Éva Erõss as Ágnes, táncosnõ
- Károly Fröhlich as Karcsi, zongorista és énekes
- György Gozmány as Péter
- Ilona Kökény as Dombay Ágnes, a táncosnõ nagynénje
- Zoltán Makláry as Repcéssy Bertalan
- György Nagyajtay as István
- Ilonka Névay as Vera, zongoramûvész
- László Pálóczi as Laci
- Andor Sárossy as Pali bácsi, vendéglõs

== Bibliography ==
- Juhász, István. Kincses magyar filmtár 1931-1944: az eredeti forgatókönyvből 1931 és 1944 között létrejött hazai mozgóképekről. Kráter, 2007.
- Rîpeanu, Bujor. (ed.) International Directory of Cinematographers, Set- and Costume Designers in Film: Hungary (from the beginnings to 1988). Saur, 1981.
