= Knock on the Window =

1944 film

- Directed by: László Sipos
- Written by: József Juhász; Lajos Pánczél
- Produced by: József Javorniczky; Antal Koncz
- Starring: László Szilassy; Éva Kelemen; Margit Ladomerszky
- Cinematography: Árpád Makay
- Music by: Dénes Buday
- Production company: Jávorniczky Film
- Release date: 1944
- Running time: 85 minutes
- Country: Hungary
- Language: Hungarian

Knock on the Window (Hungarian: Zörgetnek az ablakon) is a 1944 Hungarian drama film directed by László Sipos and starring László Szilassy, Éva Kelemen and Margit Ladomerszky. It was shot at the Hunnia Studios in Budapest.

== Synopsis ==
After graduating a young doctor plans to take a position in a private sanatorium, but after witnessing the death of an impoverished young boy from his own village he decides to return home to work on deserving cases. His socially ambitious fiancée breaks off their engagement, but in the village he falls in love with the daughter of the old doctor who shares his sense of mission.

== Cast ==
- László Szilassy
- Éva Kelemen
- Margit Ladomerszky
- Ernö Mihályi
- József Juhász
- Beáta Barkóczy
- Jenö Bodnár
- Rózsi Bordás
- Angela Christian
- István Falussy
- Gyözö Kabók
- Géza Kardos
- Ernõ Kraszna
- Mária Kúnsági
- Tibor Magyari
- Endre Markovits
- Erzsébet Nádudvary
- Ferenc Szabó
- Sándor Szabó
- László Té Szabó
- Árpád Ujváry

== Bibliography ==
- Juhász, István. Kincses magyar filmtár 1931–1944: az eredeti forgatókönyvből 1931 és 1944 között létrejött hazai mozgóképekről. Kráter, 2007.
- Kelecsényi, László. Vászonszerelem: a magyar hangosfilm krónikája 1931-től napjainkig. Noran, 2007.
- Rîpeanu, Bujor. (ed.) International Directory of Cinematographers, Set- and Costume Designers in Film: Hungary (from the beginnings to 1988). Saur, 1981.
