= Ferenc Fekete =

Hungarian cinematographer

- Born: 27 March 1914; Budapest, Austria-Hungary
- Died: 24 July 1981 (aged 67); São Paulo, Brazil
- Occupations: Cinematographer, director
- Years active: 1940–1976 (film)

Ferenc Fekete (27 March 1914 – 24 July 1981) was a Hungarian cinematographer and film director. He was noted for his camerawork on the 1942 neorealist film People of the Mountains (1942) After the Second World War he emigrated to Brazil where he set up a production company with fellow Hungarian Rudolf Icsey.

== Selected filmography ==
- Castle in Transylvania (1940)
- People of the Mountains (1942)
- A Message from the Volga Shore (1942)
- Mouse in the Palace (1943)
- The White Train (1943)
- Loving Hearts (1944)
- A Lover of the Theatre (1944)
- Devil Rider (1944)
