= Tamás Major =

Hungarian actor (1910–1986)

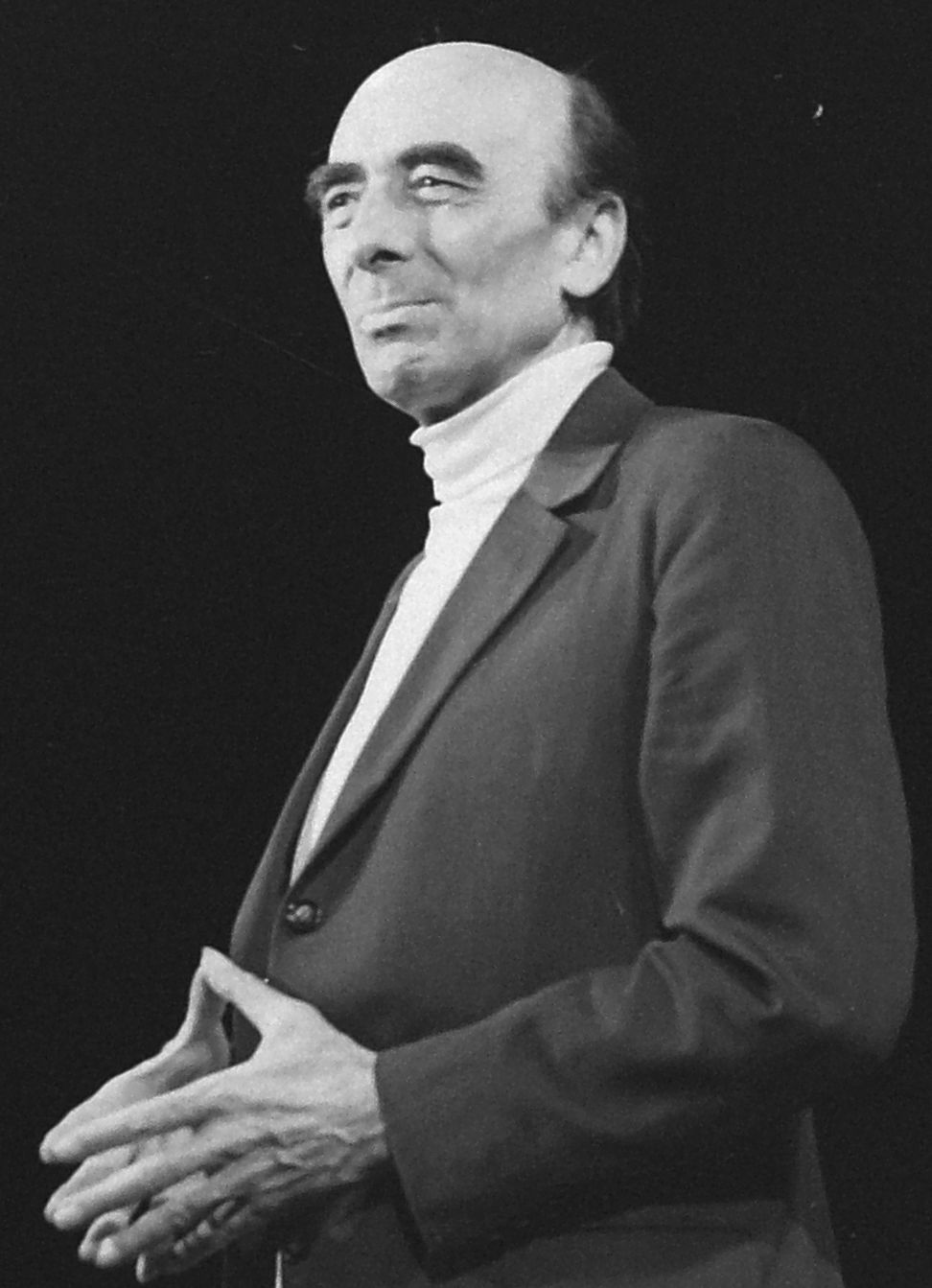
- Born: 26 January 1910; Budapest, Austria-Hungary
- Died: 13 April 1986 (aged 76); Budapest, Hungary
- Occupations: Film actor; television actor
- Years active: 1941–1986

Tamás Major (26 January 1910 – 13 April 1986) was a Hungarian stage and film actor. He also acted as the director of the Hungarian National Theatre from 1945 to 1962.

== Selected filmography ==
- A szüz és a gödölye (1941) - István, Huber fiatalabb fia
- A Strange Marriage (1951) - Jezsuita
- Erkel (1952) - Kölcsey Ferenc
- Crime at Dawn (1960) - Halmágyi
- Az utolsó vacsora (1962)
- Miért rosszak a magyar filmek? (1964) - Póczik
- Világos feladja (1964) - Mr. Borowski
- Az Életbe táncoltatott leány (1964) - A képmutogató
- Mit csinált Felséged 3-tól 5-ig? (1964) - Narrator
- Car Crazy (1965) - Igazgató
- A köszívü ember fiai (1965) - Baradlay Kázmér
- The Corporal and the Others (1965) - Albert
- Nem (1965) - Lakásügyi elõadó
- Minden kezdet nehéz (1966)
- Hideg napok (1966) - Grassy ezredes
- And Then The Guy... (1966) - Xandor
- Egy magyar nábob (1966) - Griffard
- Sellö a pecsétgyürün I (1967) - Vöröskõy
- Változó felhözet (1967) - Felügyelõ
- Jaguár (1967) - Általános bácsi
- A múmia közbeszól (1967) - Fáraó
- Three Nights of Love (1967) - Lajos, fõpincér
- Falak (1968) - Fõszerkesztõ
- Stars of Eger (1968) - I. Suleiman szultán
- Az oroszlán ugrani készül (1969) - Kálmán
- Alfa Romeó és Júlia (1969) - Bekötött fejû beteg
- Those Who Wear Glasses (1969) - Náray
- Utazás a koponyám körül (1970) - A bajuszos levantei
- Ítélet (1970) - Werbõczy
- Szerelmi álmok – Liszt (1970) - IX. Pius pápa
- A gyilkos a házban van (1971) - A házmester
- Trotta (1971) - Herr Reisiger
- Volt egyszer egy család (1972) - Kulkai házmester
- A magyar ugaron (1973) - Pap
- Football of the Good Old Days (1973) - Kerényi úr
- Végül (1974) - Nagyapa a parkban
- The Pendragon Legend (1974) - James Morvin
- Ereszd el a szakállamat! (1975) - Maracskó
- Mrs. Dery Where Are You? (1975) - Jancsó, öreg színész
- Hugo the Hippo (1975) - Aban-Khan (Hungarian version) (voice)
- Zongora a levegöben (1976) - Klimperberger, karmester
- Teketória (1977) - Zongorista
- Szabadíts meg a gonosztól (1979) - Igazgató úr
- Ajándék ez a nap (1979) - László László
- Circus maximus (1980) - Bárdos
- Mephisto (1981) - Oskar Kroge, színigazgató
- Ripacsok (1981) - Dr. Molnár Géza, elmeorvos
- Szerencsés Dániel (1983) - Dani's grandpa
- Elveszett illúziók (1983) - Rétfalvi
- A csoda vége (1984) - Péter
- Hanyatt-homlok (1984) - Nagyapa
- Colonel Redl (1985) - Baron Kubinyi
- Csak egy mozi (1985) - Oborzil - öreg színész
- Elsö kétszáz évem (1986) - Epstein
- A nagy generáció (1986) - Grandfather (final film role)

== Bibliography ==
- Eby, Cecil D. Hungary at War: Civilians and Soldiers in World War II. Penn State Press, 2007.
