= The Man of Gold (film) =

- Directed by: Viktor Gertler
- Written by: Mór Jókai (novel); Viktor Gertler
- Starring: András Csorba; Ilona Béres; Ernő Szabó; Marianne Krencsey; Ildikó Pécsi
- Cinematography: Ottó Forgács
- Edited by: Mihály Morell
- Music by: Ottó Vincze
- Production company: Hunnia Filmgyár
- Release date: 13 December 1962
- Running time: 90 minutes
- Country: Hungary
- Language: Hungarian

The Man of Gold (Hungarian: Az aranyember) is a 1962 Hungarian historical film directed by Viktor Gertler and starring András Csorba, Ilona Béres and Ernő Szabó. It was based on the novel The Man with the Golden Touch by Mór Jókai, which has been adapted for the screen several times.

The Man of Gold was the first Hungarian feature film shot in anamorphic widescreen, utilizing Agascope lenses leased from Sweden.

== Cast ==
- András Csorba as Mihály Tímár
- Ilona Béres as Tímea
- Ernő Szabó as Ali Csorbadzsi
- Marianne Krencsey as Athalie
- Zoltán Greguss as Athanáz Brazovics
- Hilda Gobbi as- Zsófia Brazovics
- Frigyes Bárány as Imre Kacsuka
- Ildikó Pécsi as Noémi
- Juci Komlós as Teréza
- Zoltán Latinovits as Tódor Krisztyán
- Károly Kovács as Minister
- Béla Barsi as Sándorovics Cirill
- Zoltán Basilides as Fabula, the helmsman
- András Ambrus
- Ilona Andrási
- Péter Bárány
- Béla Csóka
- László Ferencz
- György Gonda
- Árpád Gyenge
- Pál Gáti
- László Hlatky
- Ilona Kormos
- Edit Molnár
- Sándor Peti
- István Prókai
- Rudolf Romhányi
- Imre Sarlai
- Sándor Siménfalvy
- Nusi Somogyi
- Imre Surányi
- Böske Sándor
- István Velenczei
- Éva Ágh
- Anne Deleuze (voice)
- Rosine Rochette (voice)
