= László Sipos =

Hungarian film producer and director

- Born: 4 October 1918; Szeged, Austria-Hungary
- Died: 27 December 1944 (aged 26); Budapest, Hungary
- Occupations: Director, Producer
- Years active: 1937–1944 (film)

László Sipos (1918–1944) was a Hungarian film producer and director. He also worked as a location manager and assistant director. Having established himself as a director, he was killed in air raid during the Second World War at the age of twenty six.

== Selected filmography ==
=== Producer ===
- Flower of the Tisza (1939)
- Hölgyek elönyben (1939)
- Cserebere (1940)
- The Chequered Coat (1940)
- Europe Doesn't Answer (1941)
- At the End of September (1942)

=== Director ===
- The Perfect Family (1942)
- The White Train (1943)
- Masterless Woman (1944)
- Knock on the Window (1944)

== Bibliography ==
- Grafl, Franz. Imaginiertes Österreich: Erzählung und Diskurs im internationalen Film. Böhlau Verlag Wien, 2017.
- Kramme, Ulrike. Ungarisches biographisches Archiv: Fiche 50-73. Bayer János-Blaszó Marianne. K.G. Saur Verlag, 1993.
- Juhász, István. Kincses magyar filmtár 1931–1944: az eredeti forgatókönyvből 1931 és 1944 között létrejött hazai mozgóképekről. Kráter, 2007.
