= The Corporal and the Others =

- Directed by: Márton Keleti
- Starring: Tamás Major; Imre Sinkovits
- Production company: Mafilm
- Release date: 15 April 1965
- Running time: 1h 51min
- Country: Hungary
- Language: Hungarian

The Corporal and the Others (Hungarian: A tizedes meg a többiek) is a 1965 Hungarian comedy film directed by Márton Keleti. The film was chosen to be part of the Budapest Twelve, a list of Hungarian films considered the best in 1968.

== Cast ==
- Imre Sinkovits - Corporal Ferenc Molnár
- Iván Darvas - Second Lieutenant Eduárd Gálfy
- Tamás Major - Albert, a butler
- György Pálos - István Szíjjártó, a Communist
- László Ungváry - Lieutenant Barkányi, an Arrow Cross Party member
- László Kozák - Private Imre Gáspár / János Gáspár
- Gyula Szabó - Private György Fekete / Károly Fekete
- László Márkus - SS Obersturmführer
- Tivadar Horváth - Gutnacht, a German SS officer
- Lajos Cs. Németh - Grisha, a Russian soldier
- Sándor Szakács - the Forester
- Pálma Gyimesi - the Forester's Wife
- Gábor Agárdy - Commander of the Levente corps (a militaristic right-wing youth movement)
- László Bánhidi - Sergeant Pál Suhajda

== Plot ==
Somewhere in Hungary, in the last days of World War II, Corporal Ferenc Molnár is on the run on a motorbike. He has deserted his unit and taken its money with him. On his journey, he gathers around him a socially and politically diverse group of men whose aim is the same as his: Surviving the war.

== Background ==
As a satirical comedy about the war - a novelty at the time - the film became an immediate commercial and critical sensation in mid-1960s Hungary and was seen by 2.2 million viewers. By putting a cunning everyman into the center of the plot, not heroical partisans, and satirizing all sides, this new type of war film spoke to many everyday Hungarians.

The quote Az oroszok már a spájzban vannak! (The Russians are already in the pantry!) immediately entered the spoken Hungarian language and has been used in many variations since then.

== Accolades ==
Hungarian Film Festival 1966:

- Main award for best film (together with Twenty Hours (Húsz óra) by Zoltán Fábry and My Way Home (Így jöttem) by Miklós Jancsó)
- Best male actor (Imre Sinkovits)
- Special Award of the Jury for best director (Márton Keleti)

Awards of the Hungarian Film Critics 1965:

- Special Award
- Best male actor (Imre Sinkovits)
