= The Bells Have Gone to Rome =

1959 film

- Directed by: Miklós Jancsó
- Written by: Lajos Galambos; Lajos Szilvási
- Produced by: Dezsõ Jutasi
- Starring: Miklós Gábor; Vilmos Mendelényi; Gabi Magda
- Cinematography: Tamás Somló
- Edited by: Vera Selmeczi
- Music by: Iván Patachich
- Production company: Budapest Filmstúdió
- Release date: 30 April 1959
- Running time: 81 minutes
- Country: Hungary
- Language: Hungarian

The Bells Have Gone to Rome (Hungarian: A harangok Rómába mentek) is a 1959 Hungarian drama film directed by Miklós Jancsó and starring Miklós Gábor, Vilmos Mendelényi and Gabi Magda. It was Jancsó's first feature film having previously directed a number of short films.

== Cast ==
- Miklós Gábor as Tanár úr
- Ferenc Deák B. as Péter
- Vilmos Mendelényi as Jóska
- Gabi Magda as Jana
- József Fonyó as Center
- István Holl as Tüske
- János Pásztor as Munkaszolgálatos
- Sándor Pécsi as Angel úr
- Ferenc Ladányi as Bánfalvi százados
- Antal Farkas as Gregorics zászlós
- Mari Szemes as Cselédlány
- Zoltán Gera as Karszalagos
- József Madaras as Jóska
- Elemér Ragályi as Cigány
- János Zách as Gyulaváry

== Bibliography ==
- Burns, Bryan. World Cinema: Hungary. Fairleigh Dickinson Univ Press, 1996.
- Liehm, Mira & Liehm, Antonín J. The Most Important Art: Soviet and Eastern European Film After 1945. University of California Press, 1980.
- Rîpeanu, Bujor. (ed.) International Directory of Cinematographers, Set- and Costume Designers in Film: Hungary (from the beginnings to 1988). Saur, 1981.
