= Kamill Feleki =

Hungarian actor

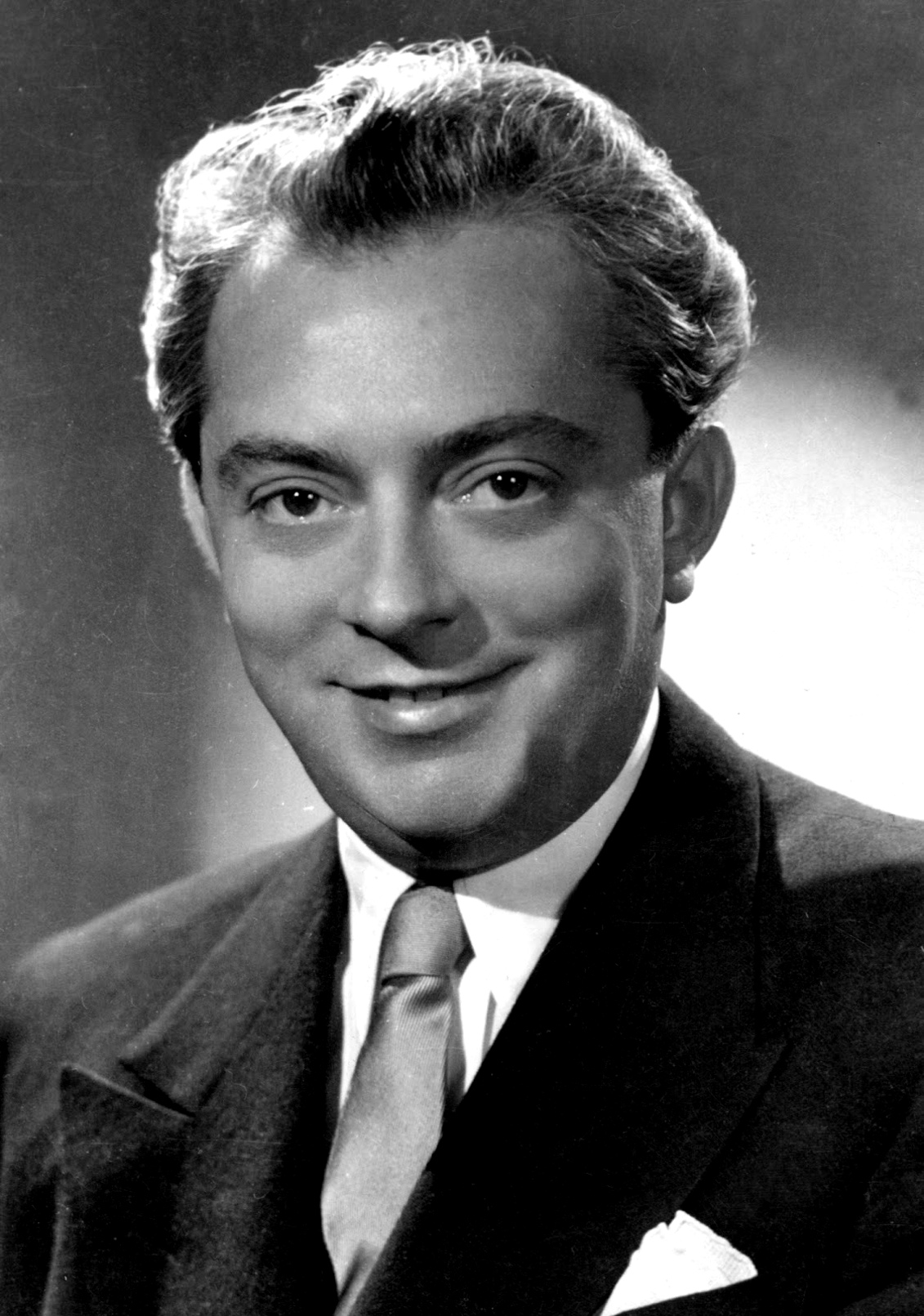
- Feleki in the 1930s
- Born: 21 August 1908; Törökbálint, Austro-Hungarian Empire
- Died: 18 October 1993 (aged 85); Budapest, Hungary
- Occupation: Actor
- Years active: 1936–1990 (film & TV)

Kamill Feleki (1908–1993) was a Hungarian film, stage and television actor.

== Selected filmography ==
- Tales of Budapest (1937)
- You Are the Song (1940)
- Matthew Arranges Things (1940)
- The Perfect Family (1942)
- The Siege of Beszterce (1948)
- The State Department Store (1953)
- The First Swallows (1953)
- Adventure in Gerolstein (1957)
- The Football Star (1957)
- A megfelelö ember (1960)

== Bibliography ==
- Burns, Bryan. World Cinema: Hungary. Fairleigh Dickinson University Press, 1996.
- De Zepetnek, Steven Tötösy & Vasvári, Louise O. Comparative Hungarian Cultural Studies. Purdue University Press, 2011.
