= Anna Báró =

Hungarian actress (1920–1994)

- Born: 3 October 1920; Bajmok, Kingdom of Serbs, Croats and Slovenes
- Died: 23 October 1994 (aged 74); Budapest, Hungary
- Occupation: Actress
- Years active: 1940–1994

Anna Báró (3 October 1920 – 23 October 1994) was a Hungarian stage, film, television and voice actress. She was known for her roles of Mrs. Tatár in the film Édes Anna, of Mrs. Alfréd Szekrényesi in the youth TV series of Keménykalap és krumpliorr (Bowler and Potato Nose), and of second-hand dealer Manci in the TV series Szomszédok.

She died in 1994, aged 74, in Budapest.

== Filmography ==
- Vasvirág (1958)
- Édes Anna (1958) - Mrs. Tatár
- A harangok Rómába mentek (The Bells Have Gone to Rome) (1959)
- A mi földünk (1959)
- Crime at Dawn (1960) - Cashkeeper
- Dúvad (1961)
- Csutak és a szürke ló (1961) - Teamster
- Az utolsó vacsora (1962) - (uncredited)
- A lóvátett város (1963, TV Movie) - Mrs. Cox
- Iszony (1965) - Az állatorvos felesége
- Butaságom története (Story of My Foolishness) (1965) - wardrobe assistant
- Az orvos halála (1966) - Bába (uncredited)
- Nem vagyunk angyalok (1967, TV Movie) - Aunt Rozi
- Egy magyar nábob (A Hungarian Nabob) (1966)
- Régi nyár (Summer of Old Times) (1969, TV Movie)
- 7 kérdés a szerelemről (és 3 alkérdés) (1969, TV Movie) - the tramway
- Csak egy telefon (1970) - fat woman
- Igéző (1970, TV Movie)
- Hangyaboly (1971)
- Das falsche Gewicht (1971, TV Movie) - Rosa Kapturak
- Egy óra múlva itt vagyok (1971, TV Mini-Series) - Mrs. Majzlik
- Keménykalap és krumpliorr (Bowler and Potato Nose) (1974, Youth TV Series) - Mrs. Alféd Szekrényesi
- Beszterce ostroma (The Siege of Beszterce) (1976, TV Mini-Series)
- Glória (1982, TV Movie)
- Különös házasság (A Strange Marriage) (1984, TV Mini-Series) - Mrs. Tóth
- Vizipók-Csodapók (Waterspider Wonderspider) (1982, TV Series) - (voice)
- Linda (1986, TV Series) - Mrs. Szabó
- Lutra (1986) - Aunt Böske
- Kreutzer szonáta (1987, TV Movie)
- Szomszédok (1988-1990, TV Series) - Manci – Second-hand Dealer
