= The Three Doves =

1944 film

- Directed by: Frigyes Bán
- Written by: Lehel Kádár; Andor Matolcsy
- Produced by: József Simon; László Udvardy
- Starring: Ernö Mihályi; Éva Kelemen; Lili Kertay
- Cinematography: Rudolf Icsey; Árpád Makay
- Edited by: Vera Besztercei
- Music by: Károly De Fries
- Production company: Hunnia Filmgyár
- Release date: 1944
- Running time: 84 minutes
- Country: Hungary
- Language: Hungarian

The Three Doves (Hungarian: A három galamb) is a 1944 Hungarian period comedy film directed by Frigyes Bán and starring Ernö Mihályi, Éva Kelemen and Lili Kertay. It was shot at the Hunnia Studios in Budapest. The film's sets were designed by the art director Imre Sörés.

== Synopsis ==
In 1910, a man tries to court each of the three beautiful daughters of a master carpenter in turn.

== Cast ==
- Ernö Mihályi as Groll Guszti / Groll Fábián, Guszti apja
- Éva Kelemen as Manci
- Lili Kertay as Stefi
- Pálma Gyimesi as Ica
- Ilona Kökény as Trosztné
- Erzsi Orsolya as Primuszné
- Angela Christian as Gloriette
- István Pálos as Bíró
- Lajos Alszeghy as Cigányprímás
- Endre C. Turáni as Patikus
- György Kürthy as Primusz István, asztalos
- Olivér Lantos as Ének
- Ferenc Szabó as Táncmester

== Bibliography ==
- Balski, Grzegorz. Directory of Eastern European Film-makers and Films 1945–1991. Flicks Books, 1992.
- Juhász, István. Kincses magyar filmtár 1931–1944: az eredeti forgatókönyvből 1931 és 1944 között létrejött hazai mozgóképekről. Kráter, 2007.
- Rîpeanu, Bujor. (ed.) International Directory of Cinematographers, Set- and Costume Designers in Film: Hungary (from the beginnings to 1988). Saur, 1981.
