= Gábor Miklós Award =

- Awarded for: Excellence in theatre, especially in classical and Shakespeare's plays
- Country: Hungary
- First award: 2000; 26 years ago

The Gábor Miklós Award is a Hungarian theater prize named after the famous actor Miklós Gábor. It is among the most important Hungarian theatrical recognitions, alongside the Kossuth Prize and the Jászai Mari Award. The award honors outstanding acting performances, especially in classical plays and Shakespeare roles, and celebrates excellence in Hungarian-language theatre.

== History ==
The award was founded in 2000 by the Gábor Miklós Foundation, established by Éva Vass, the widow of Miklós Gábor. The foundation's purpose is to preserve the actor's artistic legacy and to promote the performance of classical drama in Hungary. The award has been presented annually since its inception and is regarded as a continuation of Gábor's lifelong commitment to artistic quality and cultural heritage on stage.

== Selection and ceremony ==
The Miklós Gábor Award is presented annually to an actor or actress who has delivered an outstanding performance in a classical theatre role, especially in a play by William Shakespeare. Recipients are selected by a professional committee (kuratórium) consisting of prominent figures in Hungarian theatre, including directors, critics, and writers. Tamás Koltai chaired the committee between 2000 and 2015. Since 2017, it has been headed by Tamás Ascher. The award takes the form of a bronze plaque designed by the sculptor Tamás Vígh, depicting William Shakespeare on one side and Miklós Gábor on the other. Although primarily honorary, the prize may include a small financial contribution provided by the Gábor Miklós Foundation. The award ceremony traditionally takes place on or around 7 April, the birthday of Miklós Gábor. The presentation usually takes place on stage right after a theatrical performance. In 2025, the award was presented following a production of The Tempest at the Tamási Áron Theatre in Sepsiszentgyörgy, Transylvania.

== Recipients ==
- 2000 - Zsolt László, Antonio - The Merchant of Venice, Budapesti Kamaraszínház, Director: Róbert Alföldi
- 2001- Zsuzsa Varga, Sebastian - Twelfth Night, Gergely Csiky Theatre, Director: József Kelemen
- 2002 - Zsolt Herczeg, Puck - A Midsummer Night's Dream, National Theatre of Szeged, Director: Sándor Zsótér
- 2004 - Péter Blaskó, Titus Andronicus - Titus Andronicus, Gyulai Várszínház, Director: László Bocsárdi
- 2005 - János Kulka, Richard III - Richard III, National Theatre, Director: Péter Valló
- 2006 - Zoltán Balázs, Hamlet - Hamlet, Bárka Színház, Director: Tim Carroll
- 2007 - Judit Pogány, Fool - Twelfth Night, Örkény István Színház, Director: András Dömötör
- 2008 - Károly Hajduk, Macbeth - Macbeth, Katona József Színház, Director: Gábor Zsámbéki
- 2009 - Róbert Szegezdi, Claudius - Hamlet, Hevesi Sándor Színház, Director: Bertalan Bagó
- 2011 - András Hatházi, Popeius - Measure for Measure, Kolozsvári Állami Magyar Színház, Director: Matthias Langhoff
- 2012 - Roland Rába, Polonius - Hamlet, Nemzeti Színház, Director: Róbert Alföldi
- 2013 - László Gálffi, Prospero - The Tempest, Örkény István Színház, Director: László Bagossy
- 2014 - György Cserhalmi, King Lear - King Lear, Vörösmarty Színház, Director: Bertalan Bagó
- 2015 - D. Géza Hegedűs, Julius Caesar - Julius Caesar, Vígszínház, Director: Róbert Alföldi
- 2016 - György Bajomi Nagy, Hamlet - Hamlet, Weöres Sándor Színház, Director: Balázs Czukor
- 2017 - András Pál, Leontes - The Winter's Tale, Radnóti Színház, Director: Péter Valló
- 2018 - Imre Csuja, King Henry IV - Henry IV Parts I-II, Örkény István Színház, Director: Pál Mácsai
- 2019 - Gábor Nagypál, Macbeth - Macbeth, Jászai Mari Színház/ Szkéné Színház, Director: Rémusz Szikszai
- 2020 - László Görög, Shylock - The Merchant of Venice, Miskolci Nemzeti Színház, Director: János Mohácsi
- 2022 - Márton Pallag, Sir Toby Belch - Twelfth Night, Weöres Sándor Színház/ Forte Company, Director: Csaba Horváth
- 2023 - Katalin Takács, Puck - A Midsummer Night's Dream, Kőszegi Varszínház, Director: D. Géza Hegedűs
- 2024 - Péter Orth, Macbeth - Macbeth, Katona József Nemzeti Színház (Kecskemét), Director: Lehel Kovács
- 2025 - Janka Korodi & Tibor Pálffy, Ariel and Prospero - The Tempest, Tamási Áron Színház (Sepsiszentgyörgy), Director: Viktor Bodó

The award was not presented in 2003 and 2021.

== Legacy ==
Over the years, the Gábor Miklós Award has become a respected recognition in Hungarian theater. It not only recognizes artistic excellence but also helps preserve classical theatrical traditions and promote Shakespearean drama. The award has strengthened the connection between Hungarian and cross-border Hungarian-language theatres, drawing attention to outstanding actors from regions such as Transylvania. By continuing to celebrate Gábor Miklós's memory, the prize has become a lasting symbol of Hungarian theatrical culture and excellence.
