= Walls (1968 film) =

1968 film

- Directed by: András Kovács
- Written by: András Kovács
- Starring: Miklós Gábor
- Cinematography: György Illés
- Release date: 15 February 1968
- Running time: 95 minutes
- Country: Hungary
- Language: Hungarian

Walls (Hungarian: Falak) is a 1968 Hungarian drama film directed by András Kovács. It was entered into the 6th Moscow International Film Festival where it won a Diploma.

== Cast ==
- Miklós Gábor as Benkõ Béla
- Zoltán Latinovits as Ambrus László
- Philippe March as Lendvay
- László Mensáros as Ferenczi
- Imre Ráday as Szamosi (as Rádai Imre)
- Zsuzsa Bánki as Benkõné, Erzsi
- Mari Szemes as Ambrusné, Anna
- Judit Tóth as Márta
- Andrea Drahota as Zsuzsa
- Bernadette Lafont as Marie
- Tamás Major as Fõszerkesztõ
