= Márton Keleti =

Hungarian film director

- Born: 27 April 1905; Budapest, Hungary
- Died: 20 June 1973 (aged 68); Budapest, Hungary
- Occupation: Film director
- Years active: 1937–1973

Márton Keleti (27 April 1905 – 20 June 1973) was a Hungarian screenwriter and film director. He directed 50 films between 1937 and 1973. His 1959 film Yesterday was entered into the 1st Moscow International Film Festival.

== Selected filmography ==
- The Man Under the Bridge (1936)
- Sensation (1936)
- Viki (1937)
- Barbara in America (1938)
- The Schoolmistress (1945)
- The Siege of Beszterce (1948)
- Mickey Magnate (1949)
- Janika (1949)
- Singing Makes Life Beautiful (1950)
- A Strange Marriage (1951)
- Erkel (1952)
- Try and Win (1952)
- Kiskrajcár (1953)
- Young Hearts (1953)
- Keep Your Chin Up (1954)
- The Bridge of Life (1956)
- Two Confessions (1957)
- The Football Star (1957)
- Don Juan's Last Adventure (1958)
- Yesterday (1959)
- The Corporal and Others (1965)
- Franz Liszt. Dreams of love (1970)
