= Ildikó Pécsi =

Hungarian actress (1940–2020)

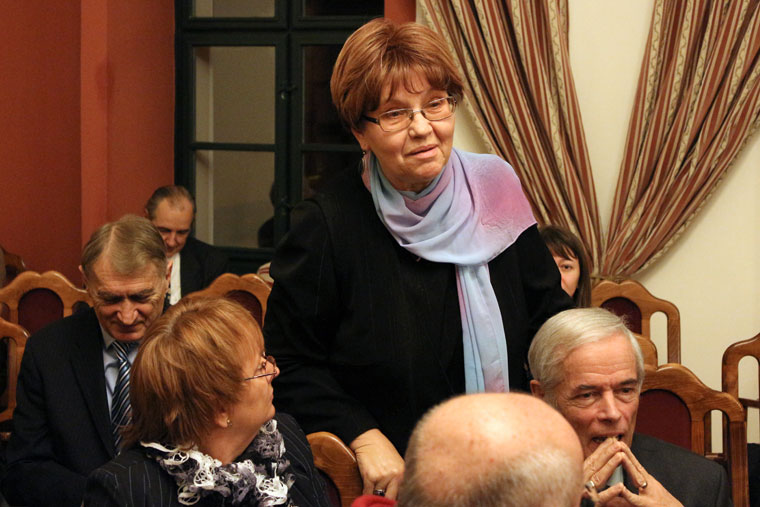
- Born: 21 May 1940; Polgár, Hungary
- Died: 5 December 2020 (aged 80); Gödöllő, Hungary
- Occupation: Actress
- Years active: 1961–2020
- Spouse: Lajos Szűcs

Ildikó Pécsi (21 May 1940 – 5 December 2020) was a Hungarian actress. She appeared in more than one hundred films since 1961.

== Selected filmography ==
Year	Title	Role	Notes
1962	The Man of Gold	Noémi	
1963	Tales of a Long Journey	Ica	
1970	Szerelmi álmok – Liszt	Lola Montez	voice dubbing in the Hungarian version
1976	The Fifth Seal	Irén	
1976	A Strange Role	Mesternő	
1977	Rain and Shine	Jolán Kajtár	
1978	Just like Home	Zsuzsi's mother	
2008	Virtually a Virgin	Auntie Fanni	
