= The Marriage of Katalin Kis =

1950 film

- Directed by: Félix Máriássy
- Written by: Judit Máriássy
- Produced by: Ferenc Pless
- Starring: Ági Mészáros; Ádám Szirtes; Sándor Pécsi
- Cinematography: István Eiben
- Edited by: Mihály Morell
- Music by: Szabolcs Fényes
- Production company: Magyar Filmgyártó
- Distributed by: Progress Film
- Release date: 20 December 1950
- Running time: 98 minutes
- Country: Hungary
- Language: Hungarian

The Marriage of Katalin Kis (Hungarian: Kis Katalin házassága) is a 1950 Hungarian drama film directed by Félix Máriássy and starring Ági Mészáros, Ádám Szirtes and Sándor Pécsi. The film's sets were designed by the art director József Pán.

== Cast ==
- Ági Mészáros as Kis Katalin
- Ádám Szirtes as Varga Jóska
- Sándor Pécsi as Barna
- Andor Ajtay as Gortvai
- Éva Ruttkai as Vilcsi
- Hilda Gobbi as Kis mama
- Zoltán Makláry as Kis papa
- Sándor Peti as Szûcs bácsi
- Miklós Gábor as Baranyai
- János Zách as Ádám
- Margit Ladomerszky as Gortvainé
- Kornélia Sallay as Vállalatvezetõnõ
- Imre Pongrácz as Gyuszi
- Itala Békés as Manci
- Hanna Loránd as Zsuzsi
- Katalin Berek as Magda
- Erzsi Pártos as Gálné
- Juci Komlós as Lujzi

== Bibliography ==
- Rîpeanu, Bujor. (ed.) International Directory of Cinematographers, Set- and Costume Designers in Film: Hungary (from the beginnings to 1988). Saur, 1981.
- Virginás, Andrea. Film Genres in Hungarian and Romanian Cinema: History, Theory, and Reception. Rowman & Littlefield, 2021.
