= The White Train =

1943 film

- Directed by: László Sipos
- Written by: Pál Barabás; Károly Nóti; János Zalabéri Horváth
- Produced by: János Zalabéri Horváth
- Starring: Erzsi Simor; Pál Jávor; Tivadar Bilicsi
- Cinematography: István Eiben; Ferenc Fekete
- Edited by: Sándor Zákonyi
- Music by: Szabolcs Fényes
- Production company: Zalabéri Horváth János Film
- Release date: 1943
- Running time: 84 minutes
- Country: Hungary
- Language: Hungarian

The White Train (Hungarian: Fehér vonat) is a 1943 Hungarian drama film directed by László Sipos and starring Erzsi Simor, Pál Jávor and Tivadar Bilicsi. It was shot at the Hunnia Studios in Budapest. The film's sets were designed by the art director Ferenc Daday.

== Cast ==
- Erzsi Simor as Mária
- Pál Jávor as Gábor
- Tivadar Bilicsi as Kovács Ferenc földbirtokos
- Jenö Danis as Ezredes
- Kató Bárczy as Terike, Kovács menyasszonya
- György Dénes as Német tiszt
- Béla Fáy as Rendõrnyomozó
- János Balázs as Balázs Ákos földbirtokos
- Zoltán Iványi as Balogh Ákos, földbirtokos
- Vali Rácz as Barbara, Ákos régi menyasszonya
- Mariska Vízváry as Mária anyja
- Karola Zala
- Ferenc Kállai
- Péter Hegyi

== Bibliography ==
- Juhász, István. Kincses magyar filmtár 1931–1944: az eredeti forgatókönyvből 1931 és 1944 között létrejött hazai mozgóképekről. Kráter, 2007.
- Rîpeanu, Bujor. (ed.) International Directory of Cinematographers, Set- and Costume Designers in Film: Hungary (from the beginnings to 1988). Saur, 1981.
- Vilmos, Várkonyi. Jávor Pál: és a magyar film aranykora. Zima Szabolcs, 2013
