= A Strange Marriage =

1951 film

- Directed by: Márton Keleti
- Written by: Gyula Háy; Kálmán Mikszáth
- Produced by: József Golda
- Starring: Gyula Benkő; Hédi Temessy; Miklós Gábor
- Cinematography: Barnabás Hegyi
- Edited by: Sándor Zákonyi
- Music by: Ferenc Szabó
- Production company: Magyar Filmgyártó Nemzeti Vállalat
- Release date: 18 February 1951
- Running time: 112 minutes
- Country: Hungary
- Language: Hungarian

A Strange Marriage (Hungarian: Különös házasság) is a 1951 Hungarian historical drama film directed by Márton Keleti and starring Gyula Benkő, Hédi Temessy and Miklós Gábor. It was shot at the Hunnia Studios in Budapest. The film's sets were designed by the art director József Pán. It is based on the novel of the same name (first published in 1900) by Kálmán Mikszáth. It was entered into the 1951 Cannes Film Festival.

== Cast ==
- Gyula Benkő as Count Párdányi Buttler János
- Miklós Gábor as Bernáth Zsiga
- Hédi Temessy as Mária, daughter of Baron Dőry
- Lajos Rajczy as Baron Dőry István
- Artúr Somlay as Archbishop Fischer
- Gábor Rajnay as Advocate Pereviczky
- Sándor Tompa as Horváth Miklós
- Éva Örkényi as Piroska, daughter of Horváth
- Sándor Pécsi as Medve Ignác, doctor
- Sándor Szabó as Vicar Szucsinka
- Tamás Major as Jesuit
- Hilda Gobbi as Mrs. Szimácsi
- Tivadar Uray as Fáy István count
- László Kemény as Professor Kövy
- József Bihari as Field guard
- Mária Sulyok as Wife of Emperor
- László Ungváry as Metternich
- László Kozák as Vidonka Józsi
- Éva Ruttkai as Katica
- Gyula Gózon as Bernáth
- Lili Berky as Mrs. Bernáth

== Bibliography ==
- Appplebaum, Anne. Iron Curtain: The Crushing of Eastern Europe 1944-56. Penguin UK, 2012.
- Ostrowska, Dorota, Pitassio, Francesco & Varga, Zsuzsanna. Popular Cinemas in East Central Europe: Film Cultures and Histories. Bloomsbury Publishing, 2017
