= Cecília Esztergályos =

Hungarian actress (born 1943)

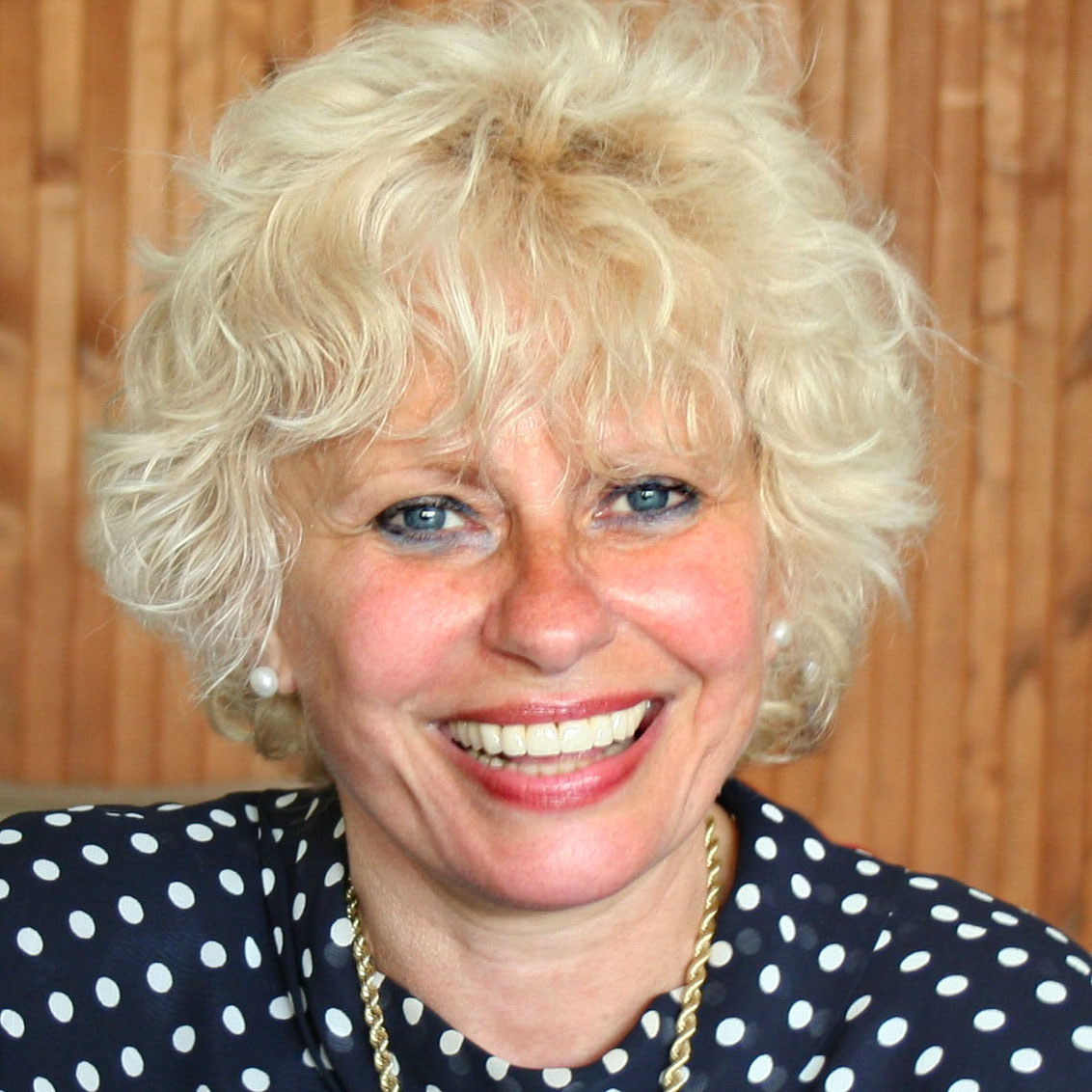
- Esztergályos in 2007
- Born: 26 January 1943 (age 83); Budapest, Hungary
- Occupation: Actress
- Years active: 1960–present

Cecília Esztergályos (born 26 January 1943) is a Hungarian actress. She appeared in more than seventy films since 1962. She was awarded the Kossuth Prize in 2018.

== Selected filmography ==
| Year | Title | Role | Notes |
|---|---|---|---|
| 1964 | The Golden Head | Anne | |
| 1965 | Age of Illusions | Ági | |
| 1973 | Football of the Good Old Days | Ila | |
| 1974 | The Pendragon Legend | Pat O'Brian | |
| 1975 | Mrs. Dery Where Are You? | Schodelné | |
