= Ilona Béres =

Hungarian actress

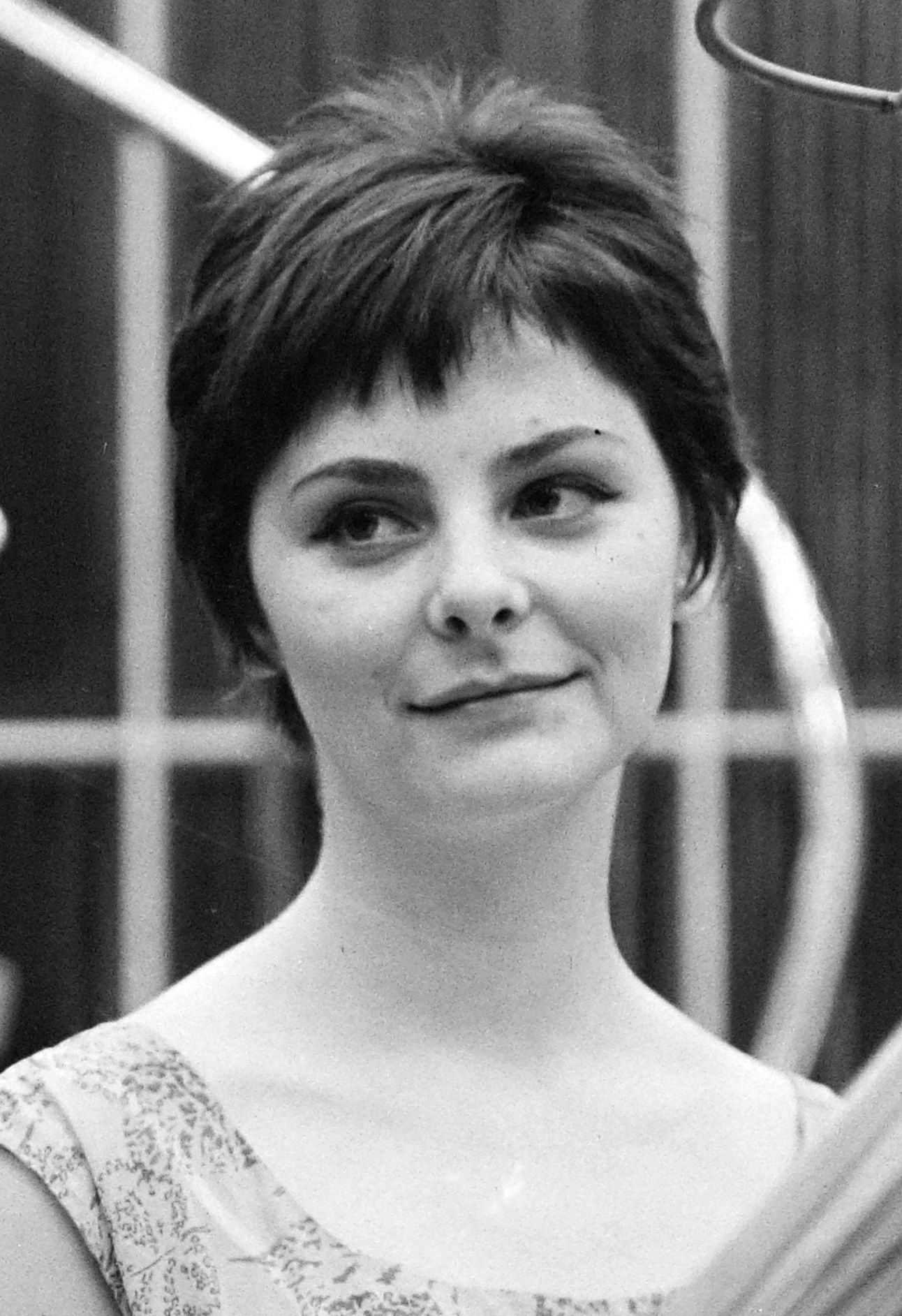
- Béres in 1963
- Born: 4 June 1942 (age 84); Kispest, Hungary
- Occupation: Actress
- Years active: 1962–present

Ilona Béres is a Hungarian film and television actress.

== Selected filmography ==
- The Man of Gold (1962)
- Hattyúdal (1963)
- Párbeszéd (1966)
- Nappali sötétség (1966)
- Three Nights of Love (1967)
- Elveszett illúziók (1983)
- Moscow Square (2001)
