= Miklós Gábor =

Hungarian actor

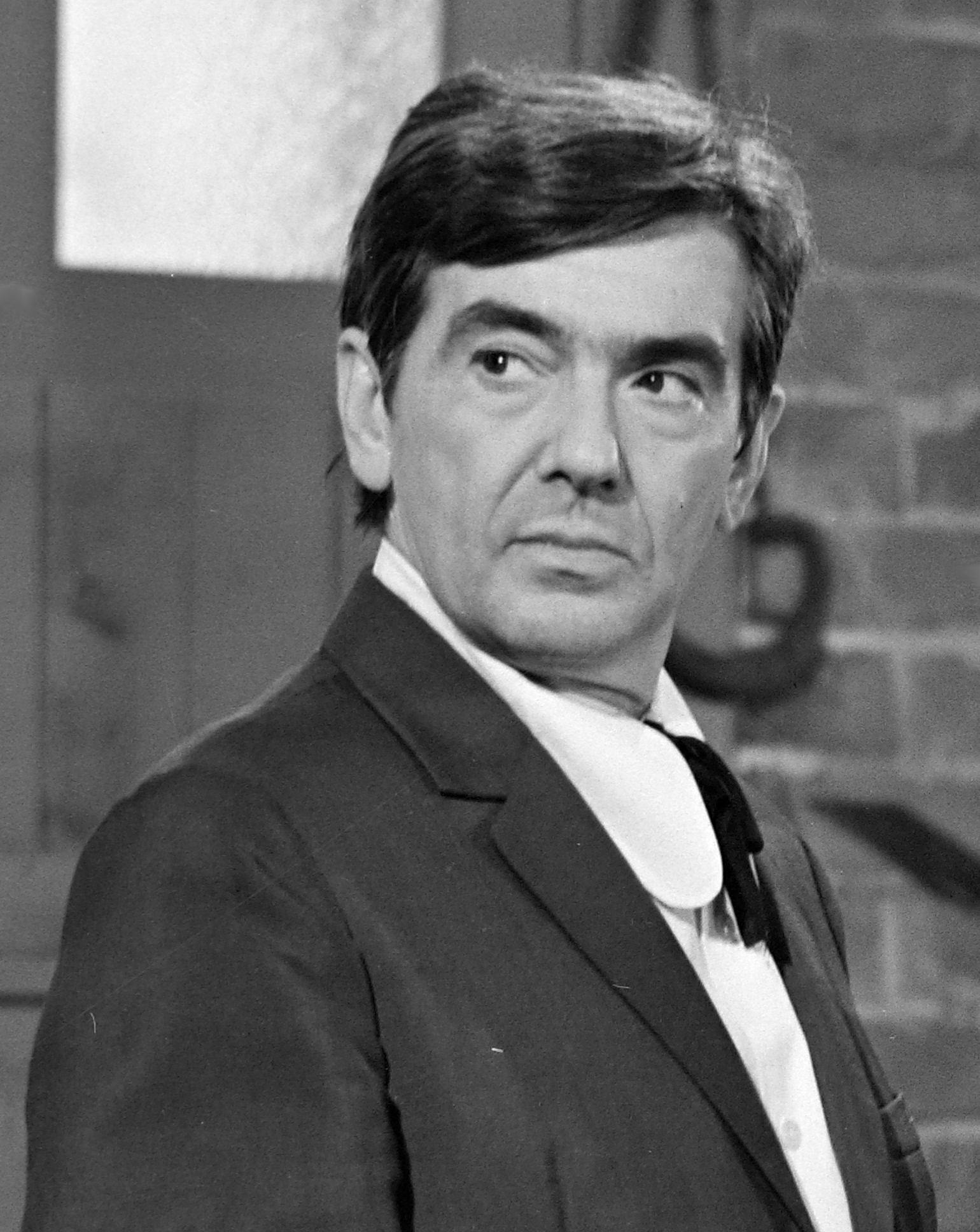
- Photograph by Zoltán Szalay, 1969
- Born: 7 April 1919; Zalaegerszeg, Hungary
- Died: 2 July 1998 (aged 79); Budapest, Hungary
- Occupation: Actor
- Years active: 1941–1994

Miklós Gábor (7 April 1919 – 2 July 1998) was a Hungarian actor, most remembered for his roles in films Valahol Európában and Mágnás Miska. He was husband to Éva Ruttkai, and later Éva Vass.

Miklós Gábor was born 7 April 1919, in Zalaegerszeg. After finishing the Academy of Drama in 1941, he joined the Madách Theatre. From 1945-1954 he was the member of the National Theatre, leaving in 1975 for the Katona József theatre in Kecskemét. From 1979 to 1984, he worked in the Népszínház theatre, after he returned to the National Theatre. In 1991, he joined the Független Színpad theatre. He died on 2 July 1998, in Budapest. The Gábor Miklós Award was created in 2000 for his honour.

== Selected filmography ==
=== Film ===
- Europe Doesn't Answer (1941) - Karmester
- Sister Beáta (1941) - Gino, Giulietta szerelmese
- A cigány (1941) - Peti - Zsiga fia
- Valahol Európában (1948) - Hosszú
- Mickey Magnate (1949) - Miska
- The Marriage of Katalin Kis (1950) - Baranyai
- A Strange Marriage (1951) - Bernáth Zsiga
- Erkel (1952) - Egressy Béni
- The State Department Store (1953) - Kocsis Ferenc
- Springtime in Budapest (1955) - Pintér Zoltán
- Ward 9 (1955) - Málnási doktor
- Az eltüsszentett birodalom (1956) - Narrátor
- At Midnight (1957) - Károlyi János
- Pillar of Salt (1958) - Erdei
- The Bells Have Gone to Rome (1959) - Tanár úr
- Kard és kocka (1959) - Árvay Ferenc kapitány
- Három csillag (1960) - Márkus Imre
- Alázatosan jelentem (1960) - Benedek Zoltán õrnagy, "Mikádó"
- Alba Regia (1961) - Hajnal
- Az utolsó vacsora (1962) - Dánusz Tamás
- Nedele ve vsední den (1962) - Kelemen
- Kertes házak utcája (1963) - Palotás
- Párbeszéd (1963) - Szalkay
- The Man Who Doesn't Exist (1964) - Tímár százados
- Már nem olyan idöket élünk (1964) - Telkes Zoltán
- Miért rosszak a magyar filmek? (1964) - Fodor
- Négy lány egy udvarban (1964) - Erõs Géza
- Ha egyszer húsz év múlva (1964) - Kénitz, Miklós
- Álmodozások kora (1964) - Flesch fõmérnök
- Másfél millió (1964)
- Játék a múzeumban (1966) - Barcza
- Apa-Egy hit naplója (1966) - Apa
- Falak (1968) - Benkõ Béla
- Kötelék (1968) - Molnár Karcsi (voice)
- Az idő ablakai (1969) - Sinis
- N.N. a halál angyala (1970) - Korin György, pszichológus
- Csak egy telefon (1970) - Dr. Forgács György
- Sértés (1979) - Igor
- Ki beszél itt szerelemről? (1980) - Parlament elnöke
- Circus Maximus (1980) - Civil
- Keserű igazság (1986) - Palócz
- Szerelő (1992, Short) - Az író
- Pá, Drágám! (1994)

=== Television ===
- Papucs (1958, TV Movie) - János
- Honfoglalás I-II. (1963, TV Movie) - Bálint
- Csiribiri (1965, TV Short) - Pál
- A helység kalapácsa (1965, TV Movie) - Lantos
- A Hanákné ügy (1969, TV Movie) - Bakonyai
- Az ördög cimborája (1973, TV Movie) - Burgoyne tábornok
- Római karnevál (1975, TV Movie) - Az író
- Vivát Benyovszky! 1-13. (1975, TV Mini-Series) - Blanchard
- Ősbemutató (1975, TV Movie)
- Közjáték Vichyben (1981, TV Movie) - Von Berg
- Holtak hallgatása (1982, TV Movie)
- Sértés (1983, TV Movie)
- Békestratégia (1985, TV Movie)
- Villanyvonat (1985, TV Movie) - Apa
- Privát kopó (1994, TV Series) - Csók Pál
