= László Márkus =

Hungarian actor

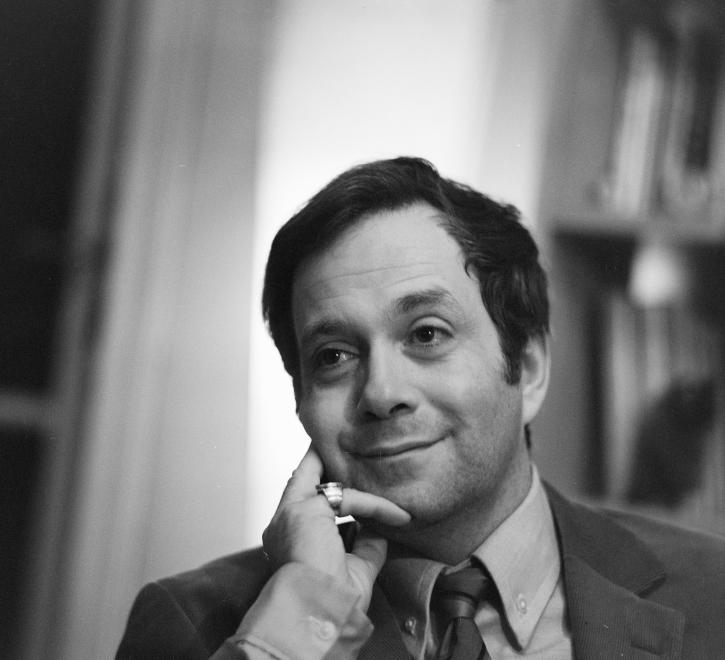
- Born: 10 June 1927; Budapest, Hungary
- Died: 30 December 1985 (aged 58); Budapest, Hungary
- Occupation: Actor
- Years active: 1952–1985

László Márkus (10 June 1927 – 30 December 1985) was a Hungarian actor. He appeared in over 90 films and television shows between 1952 and 1985. He starred in the 1985 film Első kétszáz évem, which was entered into the 36th Berlin International Film Festival.

== Selected filmography ==
- Battle in Peace (1952)
- Sunday Romance (1957)
- St. Peter's Umbrella (1958)
- A Husband for Susy (1960)
- Two Half Times in Hell (1961)
- The Moneymaker (1964)
- The Corporal and Others (1965)
- And Then The Guy... (1966)
- Stars of Eger (1968)
- Hugo the Hippo (1973)
- Football of the Good Old Days (1973)
- The Fifth Seal (1976)
- Első kétszáz évem (1985)
