= Hilda Gobbi =

Hungarian actress (1913–1988)

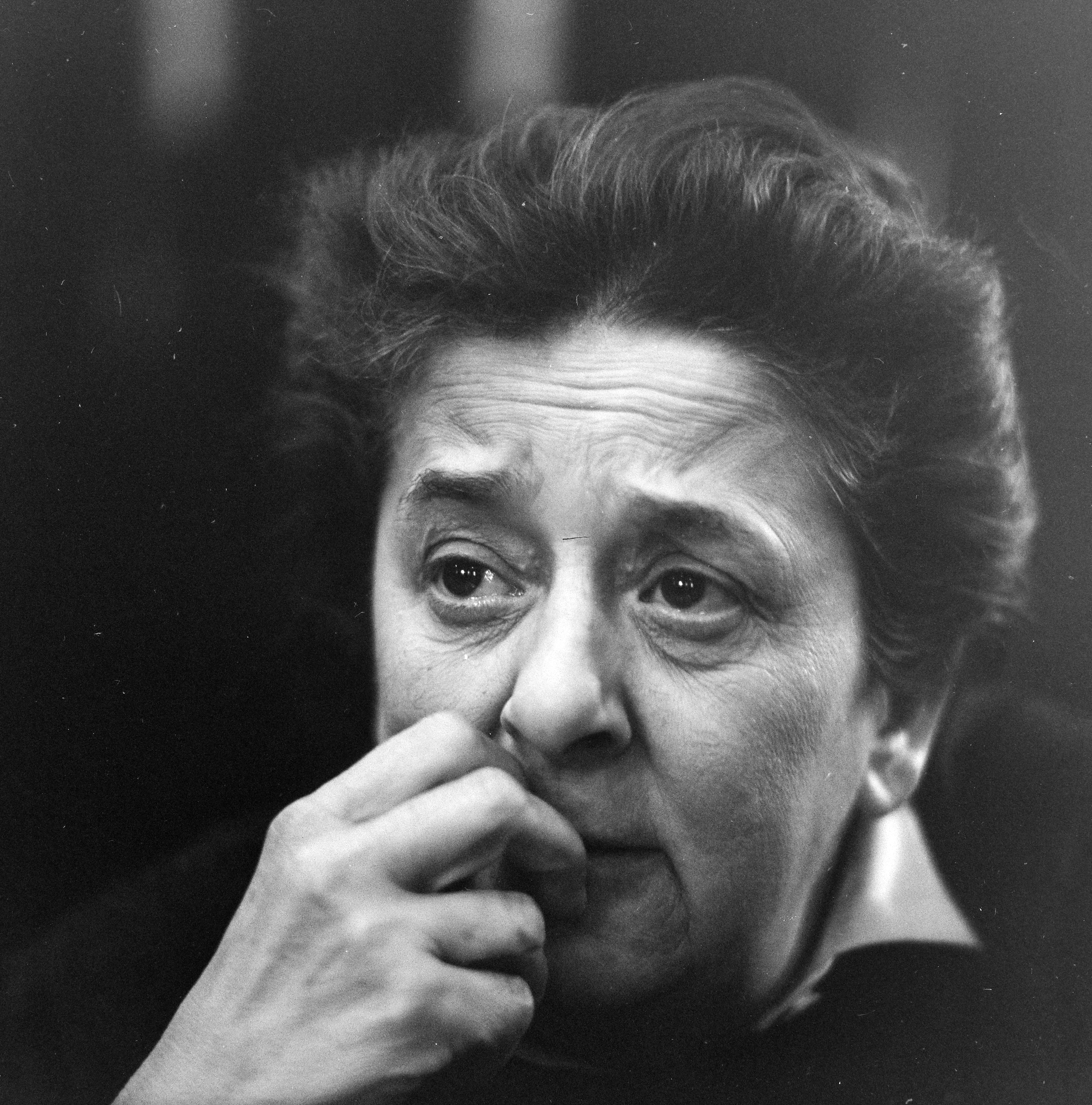
- Gobbi in 1965
- Born: Hilda Emília Gizella Gobbi; 6 June 1913; Budapest, Austria-Hungary
- Died: July 13, 1988 (aged 75); Budapest, Hungary
- Education: National Royal Hungarian Academy of Dramatic Arts
- Occupation: Actress
- Years active: 1935–1988
- Partner(s): Hédi Temessy, Erzsébet Galgóczi
- Relatives: Alois Gobbi

Hilda Emília Gizella Gobbi (6 June 1913 – 13 July 1988) was an award-winning Hungarian actress, known for her portrayals of elderly women. One of her most beloved performances was as Aunt Szabo in the radio soap opera The Szabo Family. A resistance member during World War II, she attempted to facilitate the reconstruction of the National Theatre by sponsoring a fundraising drive. Committed to her craft, she founded the Árpád Horváth Actor's College (1947), a home to care for elderly actors named after Mari Jászai (1948), a second actor's home named after Árpád Ódry (1950), the Gizi Bajor Actor's Museum (1952), and bequeathed her Patkó Villa to the National Theater for the purposes of creating a theater.

== Early life ==
Hilda Emília Gizella Gobbi was born on 6 June 1913 in Budapest, which at the time was part of the Austro-Hungarian Empire, to German, Margit (née Schneckenburger) and the Italian Hussar-turned industrialist, Ede Gobbi. Her paternal grandfather was Alois Gobbi, a noted violinist, who would later become the conductor of the National Conservatory. When she was a child, her family was well-to-do, as her father ran a paper-towel factory, but they became impoverished due to his gambling and spending money on other women. For a time, the couple separated and Gobbi and her mother were homeless.

Gobbi attended the Erzsébet Szilágyi Gymnasium and then attended the Putnoki School of Economics for Women's Higher Education (Hungarian: Putnoki Gazdasági Felső Leánynevelő Intézetben). Going on to university, she enrolled in botany classes at the Pázmány Péter Catholic University, and worked in the university's botanical garden. To continue her education, Gobbi was able to secure loans and enter the National Theater Academy as a scholarship student, attending from 1932 to 1935.

== Career ==
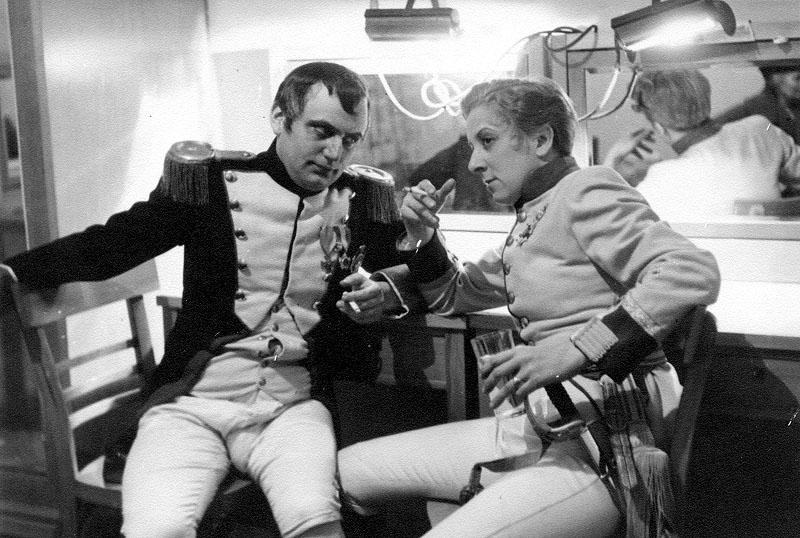
With Imre Apáthi in 1942.

Upon completing her studies at the Academy, Gobbi was contracted with the National Theater in 1935 and began participating in many productions. She was a featured artist in the productions of the Vasas Trade Union. Gobbi's first film role was in The Borrowed Castle (Hungarian: A kölcsönkért kastély, 1937) and the following year, she filmed The Lady Is a Bit Cracked (Hungarian: A hölgy kissé bogaras, 1938), in which she played an eccentric madwoman. Even in her younger days as an actress, Gobbi earned her reputation by playing older women. During the Nazi occupation of Hungary, Gobbi worked with the Resistance. Her father created forged documents to exempt men from military service, which Gobbi distributed.

Gobbi was politically active and a member of the communist party until 1956, when she left over ideological differences; she felt the party had abandoned the people. Remembering her early struggles and time of homelessness, Gobbi had a strong social conscience and was involved in creating many organizations to assist actors. In 1947, she founded the Árpád Horváth Actor's College to give aspiring actors a home and place to study. Horváth was an early actor and theater director. The following year, she created the Mari Jászai Actress Home and then in 1949, established the Ódry Árpád Actors Home, to provide a homes to care for elderly performers. During her early years of struggling, Gizi Bajor, who served as a mentor, had once given her shoes. After the actress's untimely death, Gobbi purchased Bajor's villa and created a museum named in her honor to feature Hungarian performers in 1952. Besides Bajor, there are rooms at the museum dedicated to Marian Jászai and Emília Márkus.

After the 1959 theatrical season ended, Gobbi quit the National Theater and began working in 1960 at the József Attila Theatre. At a time when homosexuality was illegal, Gobbi was open about her lesbian orientation, often dressing in men's clothing. After Hédi Temessy divorced her husband, she began a relationship with Gobbi and they lived together from the late 1950s to 1960s in a home in Buda. Homosexuality was no longer a crime after 1961 but was classified as a mental illness. After Gobbi and Temessy ended their relationship, Gobbi became the partner of the writer, Erzsébet Galgóczi. In 1971, she rejoined the National Theater and remained here until 1982. In that year, she moved to the József Katona Theater, where she performed until her death. When she received a monetary prize for her 70th birthday in 1983, Gobbi offered the entire prize money to refurbish the National Theater. She launched a nationwide fundraising drive which garnered collections of 3.3 billion forints, but the theater was never constructed and there were accusations of governmental misuse of the funds.

Gobbi performed on film, radio and stage, in a career which spanned over fifty years. She was a versatile actor and did not shy away from performing characters who were complex. She performed in a wide range of productions from comedy to tragedy, and was noted for her humor and caricatures, creating many memorable roles. Some of her most noted performances were as Gertrude in József Katona's Bánk bán; as Gertrud in Shakespeare's Hamlet, in the title role of Mihály Csokonai Vitéz's Karnyóné, as Sagittarius Misi in Zsigmond Móricz's Légy jó mindhalálig (Be faithful until death), as Rizi in István Örkény's Pisti a vérzivatarban (Pisti in the bloodstream), the mother in György Schwajda's A szent család (The holy family) and the old woman in György Spiró's Csirkefej (Chicken Head). Her role as Aunt Szabó in the Hungarian radio soap opera, The Szabó Family, was one of her most popular performances, as was the performance in Mickey Magnate (Hungarian: Mágnás Miska, 1949) in which she played an aristocratic old woman who was a kleptomaniac.

In 1982, Gobbi published her autobiography, Közben--, which was released by Szépirodalmi Kiadó. Awarded numerous honors for her performance, Gobbi received the: "Wolf Ratko Prize (1941), the Kossuth Prize (1949), Artist of Merit (1950), Outstanding Artist (1955), the Labor Merit Gold Grade (1973), SZOT Prize (1977), Order of the Flag of the Republic of Hungary (1983), and The Order of the Enlightened Flag of the Hungarian People's Republic (1988)".

== Death and legacy ==
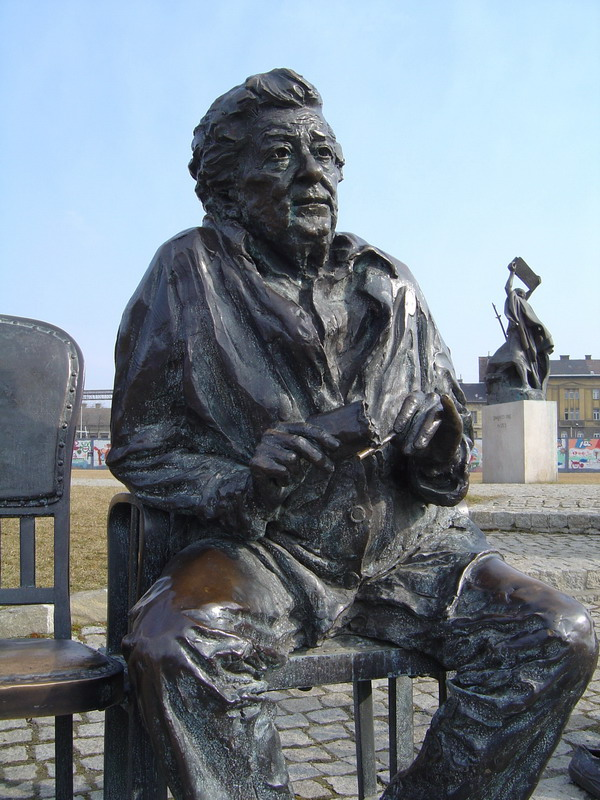
Statue of Hilda Gobbi outside of the National Theatre.

Gobbi died on 13 July 1988 in Budapest. As she had no living relatives, per the terms of her will, she left her estate to the National Theater with instructions to sell her home in Buda and use two-thirds of the proceeds to set up a prize named the Aase Award, after the mother in Peer Gynt, to make an annual award to the season's best theater production. The other third was to provide an actors' assistance fund. For her centennial birth date, numerous tributes were held throughout Budapest. She also left the National Theater her Patkó Villa vacation home in Visegrád to create a theater venue in that city. The villa was never converted and in 2017, controversy surrounded the issue, as the property had been left to decay. The Hungarian Theater in Pest took over the project from the National Theater in 2016 with the intent to complete the project; however, by April 2017, no work had been done.

== Selected filmography ==
- The Borrowed Castle (1937)
- Rézi Friday (1938)
- The Lady Is a Bit Cracked (1938)
- I Defended a Woman (1938)
- Flower of the Tisza (1939)
- The Ball Is On (1939)
- No Coincidence (1939)
- Yes or No? (1940)
- Property for Sale (1941)
- Dr. Kovács István (1942)
- A Message from the Volga Shore (1942)
- Sabotage (1942)
- Mickey Magnate (1949)
- A Woman Gets a Start (1949)
- Janika (1949)
- The Marriage of Katalin Kis (1950)
- A Strange Marriage (1951)
- Honesty and Glory (1951)
- Try and Win (1952)
- West Zone (1952)
- Relatives (1954)
- A Strange Mask of Identity (1955)
- Professor Hannibal (1956)
- Suburban Legend (1957)
- Yesterday (1959)
- Red Ink (1960)
- The Man of Gold (1962)
- The Moneymaker (1964)
- A Holiday with Piroschka (1965)
- Stars of Eger (1968)
