= István Szőts =

Hungarian screenwriter and film director

- Born: June 30, 1912; Szentgyörgyválya, Austria-Hungary
- Died: November 6, 1998 (aged 86); Vienna, Austria
- Resting place: Farkasréti Cemetery
- Occupations: Screenwriter, director
- Years active: 1941–1975
- Known for: Directing the 1942 movie People of the Mountains
- Spouse: Alice Szellay
- Awards: Kossuth Prize (1992)

István Szőts (June 30, 1912 – November 6, 1998) was a Hungarian screenwriter and film director. He was born in Szentgyörgyválya (now Valea Sângeorgiului, Călan, Romania), and later moved with his father to Hungary. Szőts studied fine arts at the painting school of the two masters, Vilmos Aba-Novák and Béla Iványi-Grünwald. In 1939 he worked at Hunnia, where he was assistant to director Lajos Zilahy.

== Activity ==
He is best known for his 1942 film People of the Mountains which won first prize at the Venice Biennale. Szőts became an assistant director in 1940, and in 1942 made his first feature film People of the Mountains. Although widely acclaimed by critics, it was disapproved of by Hungary's ruling wartime government and Szőts had trouble securing backing for his future projects. It wasn't until 1947 that he was able to make his second feature film Song of the Cornfields.

== Selected filmography ==
- People of the Mountains (1942)
- Loving Hearts (1944)
- Song of the Cornfields (1947)
- Which one of the nine? (1956)

== Bibliography ==
- Burns, Bryan. World Cinema: Hungary. Fairleigh Dickinson University Press, 1996.
- Kindem, Gorham Anders. The International Movie Industry. SIU Press, 2000.
