= People of the Mountains =

1942 Hungarian drama film

- Directed by: István Szőts
- Written by: József Nyírő (stories); István Szőts
- Starring: Alice Szellay; János Görbe; Péterke Ferency; József Bihari
- Cinematography: Ferenc Fekete
- Edited by: Zoltán Kerényi
- Music by: Ferenc Farkas
- Production company: Hunnia Filmgyár
- Distributed by: Hunnia Filmgyár
- Release date: 1942
- Running time: 88 minutes
- Country: Hungary
- Language: Hungarian

People of the Mountains (Hungarian: Emberek a havason) is a 1942 Hungarian drama film directed by István Szőts and starring Alice Szellay, János Görbe, Péterke Ferency. The film is set in the Székely woodcutting community of Transylvania. The film's plot was based on a series of short stories by József Nyírő. The film was exhibited at the 1942 Venice Film Festival, where it was widely praised. The film's style has been suggested as an influence on the emerging Italian neorealism. It was not granted an exhibition certificate in Nazi Germany because Joseph Goebbels considered it "too Catholic". The film was chosen to be part of the New Budapest Twelve, a list of Hungarian films considered the best in 2000.

== Production ==
The film was shot on location in Northern Transylvania, which had been ceded back to the Kingdom of Hungary by the Kingdom of Romania according to the Second Vienna Award in 1940, before Hungary and Romania entered the Second World War. Interior scenes were filmed at the Hunnia Film Studio in Budapest. The film was originally conceived as a short film, but the studios' bosses agreed to make it a feature film as long as costs could be kept low. Szőts had a relatively small film crew, and cast largely unknown actors in the leading roles.

== Cast ==
- Alice Szellay as Anna az asszony
- János Görbe as Erdei Csutak Gergely
- Péterke Ferency as Gergő, their son
- József Bihari as Üdő Márton
- Lajos Gárday as Ülkei Ádám
- ? as István, the manager
- ? as The Judge
- Oszkár Borovszky as Intéző / Steward
- Lenke Egyed as Szobaasszony / Landlady
- Imre Toronyi as Orvos / Village Doctor
- György Kürthy as Orvostanár / Medical Professor Gyorgy Benda
- János Pásztor as Favágó / Woodcutter
- Elemér Baló as Favágó / Woodcutter
- Jenő Danis as Favágó / Woodcutter
- Sándor Hidassy as Utas / Passenger
- János Makláry as Kalauz / Conductor

== Bibliography ==
- Cunningham, John. Hungarian Cinema: From Coffee House to Multiplex. Wallflower Press, 2004.
