= Édes Anna =

1958 film

- Film poster
- Directed by: Zoltán Fábri
- Written by: Zoltán Fábri; Péter Bacsó; Dezső Kosztolányi
- Starring: Mari Törőcsik
- Cinematography: Ferenc Szécsényi
- Edited by: Ferencné Szécsényi
- Release date: 6 November 1958
- Running time: 84 minutes
- Country: Hungary
- Language: Hungarian

Édes Anna is a 1958 Hungarian drama film directed by Zoltán Fábri. It was entered into the 1959 Cannes Film Festival. The film is sometimes referred to in English as Sweet Anna, Sweet Anne or Sweet Ann.

== Premise ==
In 1919, in Budapest, Anna, a young peasant girl, starts working as a maid for the wealthy Vizy family.

== Cast ==
- Mari Törőcsik – Anna
- Mária Mezei – Vízyné
- Károly Kovács – Vízy Kornél
- Zsigmond Fülöp – Jancsi
- Béla Barsi – Ficsor
- Anna Báró – Tatárné
- Kati Böröndi – Katica
- Zoltán Greguss – Tatár Gábor
- Hilda Gobbi – Etel
- János Horkay – Druma (as János Horkai)
- György Kálmán
- Zoltán Makláry – Dr. Moviszter
- Gellért Raksányi – Báthory
- Erzsi Simor – Moviszterné
- Viktória Ujváry – (as Újvári Viktória)
- Éva Vadnai – Drumáné

== Production ==
An adaptation of Dezső Kosztolányi's 1926 novel of the same name, the film stars Mari Törőcsik in the title role. The film only had minor deviations and "a more sociological and historical edge by downplaying the psychological dimensions" from the novel.

== Reception ==
The film has been considered "the epitome of a generation" and "(o)ne of the most shocking classics in Hungarian film history". It also was noted in the career of Fábri as "a return to his top form, combining a portrait of the 1920s with penetrating psychological analysis."
