= List of Hungarian films 1948–1989 =

This is a list collecting the most notable films produced in Hungary and in the Hungarian language during 1948–1989.

For an alphabetical list of articles on Hungarian films see Category:Hungarian films.

== 1948–1959 ==
=== 1948 ===
Title	Director	Cast	Genre	Notes
The Siege of Beszterce	Márton Keleti	Andor Ajtay, Klári Tolnay, Ida Turay	Drama	
Somewhere in Europe	Géza von Radványi	Artúr Somlay, Miklós Gábor, György Bárdy	Drama	
Treasured Earth	Frigyes Bán	Ádám Szirtes, Ági Mészáros, Tibor Molnár	Drama	
Tűz	Imre Apáthi			
Peti és az iskola	Mihály Szemes			

=== 1949 ===
Title	Director	Cast	Genre	Notes
Gala Suit	Viktor Gertler	Gyula Benkő, Zsuzsa Bánki, Iván Darvas	Comedy	
Hot Fields	Imre Apáthi	Katalin Karády, Vera Szemere, Sándor Szabó	Drama	
Janika	Márton Keleti	Ida Turay, Sándor Szabó, Mária Mezei	Comedy	
Mickey Magnate	Márton Keleti	Miklós Gábor, Ági Mészáros, Kálmán Latabár	Comedy	
Szabóné	Félix Máriássy			
A Woman Gets a Start	Imre Jeney	Klári Tolnay, Ferenc Ladányi, Lajos Básti	Drama	

=== 1950 ===
Title	Director	Cast	Genre	Notes
Lúdas Matyi	Kálmán Nádasdy	Imre Soós, György Solthy, Erzsi Pártos, Teri Horváth		The first Hungarian film in color, Best male actor, Karlovy Vary Film Festival 1950
The Marriage of Katalin Kis	Félix Máriássy	Ági Mészáros, Ádám Szirtes, Sándor Pécsi	Drama	
Úri muri	Frigyes Bán	Sándor Deák, Éva Szörényi, Ági Mészáros		
Singing Makes Life Beautiful	Márton Keleti	Imre Soós, Violetta Ferrari, Kálmán Latabár	Musical comedy	
Kezünkbe vettük a béke ügyét	Miklós Jancsó			Jancsó's debut short film

=== 1951 ===
Title	Director	Cast	Genre	Notes
Déryné	László Kalmár	Klári Tolnay, Gábor Rajnay, Gyula Gózon	Historical	
Full Steam Ahead	Félix Máriássy	Imre Sinkovits, Marcsa Simon, Ferenc Bessenyei	Drama	
Honesty and Glory	Viktor Gertler	János Görbe, Mária Sulyok, Hilda Gobbi	Comedy	
The Land Is Ours	Frigyes Bán	Ádám Szirtes, Ági Mészáros, János Görbe	Drama	
A Strange Marriage	Márton Keleti	Gyula Benkő, Hédi Temessy, Miklós Gábor	Drama	Entered into the 1951 Cannes Film Festival
Underground Colony	Károly Makk, Mihály Szemes	József Bihari, Erzsi Orsolya, Ferenc Ladányi	Drama	

=== 1952 ===
Title	Director	Cast	Genre	Notes
Baptism of Fire	Frigyes Bán	József Bihari, Gyula Gózon, Zoltán Makláry	Drama	
Battle in Peace	Viktor Gertler	Tibor Molnár, Ádám Szirtes, László Bánhidi	Drama	
Erkel	Márton Keleti	Sándor Pécsi, Éva Szörényi, Miklós Gábor	Historical	
Semmelweis	Frigyes Bán	Imre Apáthi, Tivadar Uray, Juci Komlós	Drama	
Storm	Zoltán Fábri	József Bihari, Manyi Kiss, Ferenc Bessenyei	Drama	
Try and Win	Márton Keleti	Imre Soós, János Görbe, Violetta Ferrari	Sports comedy	
Vadvízország	István Homoki Nagy		Documentary	Best director of photography, Karlovy Vary Film Festival
West Zone	Zoltán Várkonyi	Artúr Somlay, Ádám Szirtes, Sándor Pécsi	Spy thriller	

=== 1953 ===
Title	Director	Cast	Genre	Notes
The First Swallows	Frigyes Bán	Zoltán Makláry, Kamill Feleki, Margit Ladomerszky	Comedy	
Gyöngyvirágtól lombhullásig	István Homoki Nagy			1st prize for popular science films at the Venice Film Festival 1953
A harag napja	Zoltán Várkonyi	Ferenc Bessenyei, Erzsi Somogyi		
Kiskrajcár	Márton Keleti	Ági Mészáros		Entered into the 1954 Cannes Film Festival
The Sea Has Risen	Mihály Szemes	Lajos Básti, János Görbe, Zoltán Makláry, Ferenc Bessenyei	Drama	
The State Department Store	Viktor Gertler	Miklós Gábor, Zsuzsa Petress, Kamill Feleki, Kálmán Latabár, Ida Turay	Comedy	

=== 1954 ===
Title	Director	Cast	Genre	Notes
Fourteen Lives	Zoltán Fábri	Béla Barsi, László Bánhidi, Imre Sinkovits	Drama	
Keep Your Chin Up	Márton Keleti	Kálmán Latabár, Violetta Ferrari, Gyula Benkő	Comedy	
Liliomfi	Károly Makk	Iván Darvas, Marianne Krencsey	Comedy	Entered into the 1955 Cannes Film Festival
Me and My Grandfather	Viktor Gertler	Éva Ruttkai, Gyula Gózon, Samu Balázs	Drama	
Rakoczy's Lieutenant	Frigyes Bán	Tibor Bitskey, Éva Vass, Ferenc Zenthe	Historical	
Relatives	Félix Máriássy	László Ungváry, Klári Tolnay, Gábor Rajnay	Drama	

=== 1955 ===
Title	Director	Cast	Genre	Notes
Accident	Viktor Gertler	Iván Darvas, Violetta Ferrari, Imre Apáthi	Drama	
A Glass of Beer	Félix Máriássy	Éva Ruttkai, Tibor Bitskey, Elma Bulla	Comedy	
Kétszer kettő néha öt	György Révész	Violetta Ferrari, Zoltán Makláry		
Love Travels by Coach	László Ranódy	Mária Medgyesi, Ádám Szirtes, Zoltán Makláry	Comedy	
Springtime in Budapest	Félix Máriássy	Tibor Molnár, Miklós Gábor, Zsuzsa Gordon	War drama	
A Strange Mask of Identity	Zoltán Várkonyi	Ferenc Bessenyei, Éva Ruttkai, Imre Sinkovits	War drama	
Ward 9	Károly Makk	Marianne Krencsey, Tibor Molnár, Zoltán Makláry	Drama	

=== 1956 ===
Title	Director	Cast	Genre	Notes
Az eltüsszentett birodalom	Tamás Banovich	Imre Soós, Marianne Krencsey, József Tímár, Vera Sennyei		
The Bridge of Life	Márton Keleti	János Görbe, Ági Mészáros, Zoltán Makláry	Drama	
Dollar Daddy	Viktor Gertler	Iván Darvas, János Rajz, Imre Ráday	Comedy	
Leila and Gábor	László Kalmár	Ferenc Zenthe, Marianne Krencsey, Imre Sinkovits	Musical	
Merry-Go-Round	Zoltán Fábri	Mari Törőcsik, Imre Soós, Ádám Szirtes, Flóra Kádár	Drama	Entered into the 1956 Cannes Film Festival
Professor Hannibal	Zoltán Fábri	Ernő Szabó, Manyi Kiss, Zoltán Makláry	Drama	
Tanár úr kérem	Frigyes Mamcserov	István Horesnyi		

=== 1957 ===
Title	Director	Cast	Genre	Notes
Adventure in Gerolstein	Zoltán Farkas	Erzsébet Házy, Iván Darvas, Manyi Kiss	Comedy	
At Midnight	György Révész	Éva Ruttkai, Miklós Gábor, Zsuzsa Bánki	Drama	
By Order of the Emperor	Frigyes Bán	Ferenc Bessenyei, Éva Ruttkai, Sándor Deák	Historical	
Dani	Mihály Szemes	Klári Tolnay, Margit Bara, Antal Páger	Drama	
Fever	Viktor Gertler	Ferenc Bessenyei, Tivadar Uray, Margit Bara	Drama	
The Football Star	Márton Keleti	Kamill Feleki, László Ungváry, Manyi Kiss	Sports comedy	
Spiral Staircase	Frigyes Bán	Rudolf Somogyvári, Éva Vass, Béla Barsy	Drama	
Suburban Legend	Félix Máriássy	Géza Tordy, Mari Törőcsik, Manyi Kiss	Drama	
Summer Clouds	Zoltán Fábri	Marianne Krencsey, László Mensáros, Mária Sulyok	Comedy	
Sunday Romance	Imre Fehér	Iván Darvas, Margit Bara, Sándor Pécsi	Romance	
Tale on the Twelve Points	Károly Makk	Klári Tolnay, Ferenc Zenthe, Irén Psota	Comedy	
Two Confessions	Márton Keleti	Mari Törőcsik, Marianne Krencsey, Lajos Őze	Crime	Entered into the 1957 Cannes Film Festival

=== 1958 ===
Title	Director	Cast	Genre	Notes
A Bird of Heaven	Imre Fehér	Ádám Szirtes, Ferenc Kiss, Erzsi Somogyi	Drama	
Danse Macabre	László Ranódy, László Nádasy	Klári Tolnay, Antal Páger, Margit Bara	Drama	
Don Juan's Last Adventure	Márton Keleti	Zoltán Várkonyi, Margit Bara, Antal Páger	Drama	
Édes Anna	Zoltán Fábri	Mari Törőcsik, Anna Báró	Drama	Entered into the 1959 Cannes Film Festival
The House Under the Rocks	Károly Makk	János Görbe, Irén Psota, Margit Bara	Drama	
Iron Flower	János Herskó	Mari Törőcsik, István Avar, Zoltán Várkonyi	Drama	Entered into the 1958 Cannes Film Festival
Pillar of Salt	Zoltán Várkonyi	Antal Páger, Anna Tõkés, Éva Ruttkai	Drama	
A Quiet Home	Frigyes Bán	Ferenc Zenthe, Erzsi Galambos, Irén Psota	Comedy	
The Smugglers	Félix Máriássy	Margit Bara, Gábor Agárdi, Teri Horváth	Drama	
St. Peter's Umbrella	Frigyes Bán	Mari Törőcsik, Sándor Pécsi	Drama	Co-production with Czechoslovakia
What a Night!	György Révész	Kálmán Latabár, Klári Tolnay, Éva Ruttkai	Comedy	

=== 1959 ===
Title	Director	Cast	Genre	Notes
Bogáncs	Tamás Fejér	Zoltán Makláry, Ida Siménfalvy		
Az élet megy tovább	Márta Mészáros			
Kard és kocka	Imre Fehér	Miklós Gábor		
Pár lépés a határ	Márton Keleti			
Égre nyíló ablak	József Kis			
Halhatatlanság	Miklós Jancsó			
The Bells Have Gone to Rome	Miklós Jancsó	Miklós Gábor, Sándor Pécsi, Gabi Magda	Drama	
For Whom the Larks Sing	László Ranódy	Géza Tordy, Klári Tolnay, Antal Páger	Drama	
A Game with Love	Imre Apáthi	László Mensáros, Irén Psota, Ferenc Kiss	Comedy	
The Poor Rich	Frigyes Bán	Gyula Benkő, Marianne Krencsey, Margit Bara	Historical	
Sleepless Years	Félix Máriássy	Éva Ruttkai, Géza Tordy, Éva Vass	Drama	
Up the Slope	Viktor Gertler	Erzsébet Házy, György Kálmán, Imre Ráday	Comedy	
Yesterday	Márton Keleti			Entered into the 1st Moscow International Film Festival

== 1960–1969 ==
=== 1960 ===
Title	Director	Cast	Genre	Notes
Alázatosan jelentem	Mihály Szemes	László Csákányi, Alfréd Deésy, György Pálos		
Az arc nélküli város	Tamás Fejér			
Be True Until Death	László Ranódy	Ferenc Bessenyei, József Bihari, Tibor Bitskey	Drama	
Crime at Dawn	Zoltán Várkonyi	Lajos Básti, Irén Psota, Antal Páger	Drama	
A Husband for Susy	Frigyes Bán	Mária Sulyok, Imre Ráday, Tibor Bitskey	Drama	
Fűre lépni szabad	Károly Makk	Antal Páger, Zoltán Makláry		
Útinapló	Péter Bacsó			Bacsó's debut film
Kálvária	Gyula Mészáros	Antal Páger, Géza Tordy, Gábor Agárdy		
Red Ink	Viktor Gertler	Éva Vass, György Pálos, Nóra Tábori	Drama	
Young Noszty and Mary Toth	Viktor Gertler	Tivadar Uray, Marianne Krencsey, Antal Páger	Comedy	

=== 1961 ===
Title	Director	Cast	Genre	Notes
Alba Regia	Mihály Szemes			Entered into the 2nd Moscow International Film Festival
Dúvad	Zoltán Fábri	Ferenc Bessenyei, Mária Medgyesi, Tibor Bitskey		Entered into the 1961 Cannes Film Festival
Csutak és a szürke ló	Zoltán Várkonyi	Gábor Veress, Mari Szemes, Ferenc Kállai		
Megszállottak	Károly Makk	György Pálos, Éva Pap, Ádám Szirtes		Banned for several years
Nem ér a nevem	Márton Keleti	Klári Tolnay, Antal Páger		
Sunshine on the Ice	Frigyes Bán	Ferenc Bessenyei, Manyi Kiss, Mária Mezei	Comedy	
Szívdobogás	Márta Mészáros			

=== 1962 ===
Title	Director	Cast	Genre	Notes
Land of Angels	György Révész	Tamás Végvári, Klári Tolnay, Ferenc Zenthe	Drama	
The Man of Gold	Viktor Gertler	András Csorba, Ilona Béres, Marianne Krencsey, Ildikó Pécsi	Historical	
I'll Go to the Minister	Frigyes Bán	László Bánhidi, Antal Páger	Comedy	
Fagyosszentek	György Révész			
Kamaszváros	Márta Mészáros			
Two Half Times in Hell	Zoltán Fábri	Imre Sinkovits, Dezső Garas, Gyula Benkő	War drama	
Mici néni két élete	Frigyes Mamcserov	Manyi Kiss, Antal Páger		
Az utolsó vacsora	Zoltán Várkonyi			
Elveszett paradicsom	Károly Makk	György Pálos, Antal Páger		

=== 1963 ===
Title	Director	Cast	Genre	Notes
Kertes házak utcája	Tamás Fejér	Margit Bara	Drama	Entered into the 1963 Cannes Film Festival
Pacsirta	László Ranódy	Antal Páger	Drama	Entered into the 1964 Cannes Film Festival
Oldás és kötés	Miklós Jancsó	Zoltán Latinovits		
Hattyúdal	Márton Keleti	Antal Páger		
Az utolsó előtti ember	Károly Makk	Attila Nagy		
Tücsök	Miklós Markos	Dezső Kellér, Cecília Esztergályos		
Tales of a Long Journey	Tamás Rényi			Entered into the 3rd Moscow International Film Festival

=== 1964 ===
Title	Director	Cast	Genre	Notes
Age of Illusions	István Szabó	András Bálint, Ilona Béres		
A Girl Danced Into His Life	Tamás Banovich	Levente Sipeki, Adél Orosz		Entered into the 1965 Cannes Film Festival
The Golden Head	James Hill	George Sanders, Buddy Hackett	Drama	Co-production with US
Lady-Killer in Trouble	Viktor Gertler	Sándor Pécsi, Dezsö Garas, Mária Mezei	Comedy	
The Man Who Doesn't Exist	Viktor Gertler	Miklós Gábor, Éva Vass, Andor Ajtay	Crime drama	
The Moneymaker	Frigyes Bán	Sándor Pécsi, Hilda Gobbi, Zoltán Greguss	Comedy	
Sodrásban	István Szabó	Sándor Csikós, András Kozák		
Szerelmes biciklisták	Péter Bacsó	László Tahi Tóth, István Uri, Tibor Orbán		
Ezer év	Félix Máriássy			
Igen	György Révész	Iván Darvas, Ilona Béres		

=== 1965 ===
Title	Director	Cast	Genre	Notes
Car Crazy	Frigyes Bán	Sándor Pécsi, Imre Sinkovits, Tamás Major	Comedy	
Háry János	Miklós Szinetár	Ádám Szirtes, Mária Medgyesi	Musical	
Nyitány	János Vadász		Documentary	Won the Short Film Palme d'Or at the 1965 Cannes Film Festival and nominated for an Oscar
Szegénylegények	Miklós Jancsó	János Görbe, Zoltán Latinovits	Drama	Entered into the 1966 Cannes Film Festival
Húsz óra	Zoltán Fábri	Antal Páger	Drama	Won the Grand Prix at the 4th Moscow International Film Festival

=== 1966 ===
Title	Director	Cast	Genre	Notes
And Then The Guy...	Viktor Gertler	Imre Sinkovits, Irén Psota, Mari Törőcsik	Comedy	
Apa	István Szabó	András Bálint, Miklós Gábor		Grand Prix at the 5th Moscow International Film Festival (1967) and Locarno Film Festival (1997)
Az aranysárkány	László Ranódy			
A tizedes meg a többiek	Márton Keleti	Imre Sinkovits, Iván Darvas, Tamás Major		
Barbárok	Éva Zsurzs	János Görbe		
Egy magyar nábob	Zoltán Várkonyi	Zoltán Latinovits, Iván Darvas, Ferenc Bessenyei		
Utószezon	Zoltán Fábri	Antal Páger, József Szendrő, János Rajz		
Édes és keserű	Mihály Szemes	Margit Bara, Miklós Szakáts		

=== 1967 ===
Title	Director	Cast	Genre	Notes
Csend és kiáltás	Miklós Jancsó	András Kozák		
The Healing Water	Frigyes Bán	János Körmendi, Attila Nagy, Mari Szemes	Comedy	
The Red and the White	Miklós Jancsó	András Kozák, Jácint Juhász		Listed to compete at the 1968 Cannes Film Festival
Ten Thousand Days	Ferenc Kósa	András Kozák	Drama	Kósa won the Best Director award at the 1967 Cannes Film Festival
Three Nights of Love	György Révész	Vera Venczel, Iván Darvas, Imre Sinkovits	Drama	
A koppányi aga testamentuma	Éva Zsurzs	Péter Benkő, Ferenc Bessenyei		
Öngyilkosság	Ferenc Kósa			
Tanulmány a nőkről	Márton Keleti	Vera Venczel, Iván Darvas, Antal Páger		

=== 1968 ===
Title	Director	Cast	Genre	Notes
Egri csillagok	Zoltán Várkonyi	Imre Sinkovits, István Kovács, Vera Venczel		
Fejlövés	Péter Bacsó	Kati Kovács, Károly Horváth, József Miller		
A veréb is madár	György Hintsch	László Kabos		
Bors	Miklós Markos	István Sztankay, Imre Antal, István Bujtor, Gábor Koncz		
A hamis Izabella	István Bácskai Lauró	Éva Ruttkai		
Keresztelő	István Gaál	Zoltán Latinovits, János Koltai		
Tiltott terület	Pál Gábor	György Bánffy	Drama	
Walls	András Kovács			Entered into the 6th Moscow International Film Festival

=== 1969 ===
Title	Director	Cast	Genre	Notes
Az Alvilág professzora	Mihály Szemes	Zoltán Latinovits		
A Tanú	Péter Bacsó	Ferenc Kállai, Lajos Őze	Satire	Banned for a number of years, later screened at the 1981 Cannes Film Festival
Feldobott kő	Sándor Sára	Lajos Balázsovits		Listed to compete at the 1968 Cannes Film Festival
A beszélő köntös	Tamás Fejér	István Iglódi, Antal Páger		
Agitátorok	Dezső Magyar	Gábor Bódy, Tamás Szentjóby, György Cserhalmi		Banned after release
Fényes szelek	Miklós Jancsó			
Hosszú futásodra mindig számíthatunk	Gyula Gazdag			
Isten hozta, őrnagy úr	Zoltán Fábri	Zoltán Latinovits, Imre Sinkovits		Based on the novel by István Örkény, entered into the 7th Moscow International Film Festival
Az oroszlán ugrani készül	György Révész	István Bujtor, Ilona Medveczky, Irén Psota, Andor Ajtay		
A Pál utcai fiúk	Zoltán Fábry	Anthony Kemp, Mari Törőcsik, William Burleigh, Julien Hoidaway		Nominated for Oscar, Best Foreign Film (1969)
Szemüvegesek	Sándor Simó	István Bujtor		
Virágvasárnap	Imre Gyöngyössy	Velecký František, Benedek Tóth		

== 1970–1979 ==
Title	Director	Cast	Genre	Notes
1970
Magasiskola	István Gaál	Ivan Andonov, György Bánffy, Judit Meszléry	Drama	Won the Jury Prize at the 1970 Cannes Film Festival
Égi bárány	Miklós Jancsó	József Madaras, Daniel Olbrychski		
Hatholdas rózsakert	László Ranódy	Klári Tolnay, László Tahi Tóth, Andrea Drahota		
Kitörés	Péter Bacsó	Sándor Oszter, Zsuzsa Hőgye, Ferenc Kállai, Katalin Lendvai		
Szerelmi álmok – Liszt	Márton Keleti	Imre Sinkovits	Musical/Drama/Romance	
Szép lányok, ne sírjatok!	Márta Mészáros			
Utazás a koponyám körül	György Révész	Zoltán Latinovits, Éva Ruttkai		
Én vagyok Jeromos	István Tímár	Alfonzó, Gábor Harsányi		
1971
Szerelem	Károly Makk	Lili Darvas, Mari Törőcsik, Iván Darvas	Drama	Won three awards at the 1971 Cannes Film Festival
Büntetőexpedíció	Dezső Magyar			Banned after release, Critics' Week Selection at the 1971 Cannes Film Festival
Hahó, Öcsi!	György Palásthy	Krisztián Kovács, Manyi Kiss		
Madárkák	Géza Böszörményi	Ildikó Bánsági, Ila Schütz		
Szindbád	Zoltán Huszárik	Zoltán Latinovits, Éva Ruttkai		
1972
Macskajáték	Károly Makk	Margit Dajka, Ildikó Piros, Mari Törőcsik	Drama	Academy Award nomination and entered into the 1974 Cannes Film Festival
Holt vidék	István Gaál	Mari Törőcsik		
Még kér a nép	Miklós Jancsó	József Madaras, Tibor Orbán, Tibor Molnár		Jancsó won the award for Best Director at the 1972 Cannes Film Festival
Utazás Jakabbal	Pál Gábor	Péter Huszti, Ion Bog	Drama	
1973
Petőfi '73	Ferenc Kardos	Mihály Kovács	Drama	Entered into the 1973 Cannes Film Festival
Ártatlan gyilkosok	Zoltán Várkonyi	Péter Huszti, László Tahi Tóth		
Fotográfia	Pál Zolnay	Márk Zala	Drama	Entered into the 8th Moscow International Film Festival
Kakuk Marci	György Révész	Gábor Harsányi		
Kincskereső kisködmön	Mihály Szemes	Péter Haumann		
Régi idők focija	Pál Sándor	Dezső Garas		
Egy srác fehér lovon	György Palásthy	Sándor Oszter		
Szabad lélegzet	Márta Mészáros	Erzsébet Kútvölgyi		
János Vitéz	Marcell Jankovics		Animation	First feature-length Hungarian animated film.
Hugó a víziló	Bill Feigenbaum, József Gémes	Ferenc Bessenyei (voice), László Márkus (voice), Tamás Major (voice), Gábor Berkes (voice), István Bujtor (voice), Kati Kovács (voice), Erzsébet Kútvölgyi (voice), Péter Máté (voice)	Animation	
1974
Szerelmem, Elektra	Miklós Jancsó	Mari Törőcsik, György Cserhalmi, József Madaras	Drama	Entered into the 1975 Cannes Film Festival
A dunai hajós	Miklós Markos	Gábor Koncz	Adventure	
The Pendragon Legend	György Révész	Zoltán Latinovits, Iván Darvas	Thriller	
1975
Örökbefogadás	Márta Mészáros	Katalin Berek, Flóra Kádár	Drama	Won the Golden Bear at Berlin
Déryné, hol van?	Gyula Maár	Mari Törőcsik, Ferenc Kállai, Flóra Kádár	Drama	Törőcsik won Best Actress at the 1976 Cannes Film Festival
Amerikai anzix	Gábor Bódy	György Cserhalmi, Sándor Csutorás, András Fekete		
141 perc a befejezetlen mondatból	Zoltán Fábri	András Bálint		Entered into the 9th Moscow International Film Festival
Kopjások	György Palásthy	András Bálint		
Ereszd el a szakállamat	Péter Bacsó	László Helyey, Ferenc Kállai		
1976
Azonosítás	László Lugossy	György Cserhalmi	Drama	Won a Silver Bear at Berlin
Budapesti mesék	István Szabó	András Bálint, Ági Mészáros	Drama	Entered into the 1977 Cannes Film Festival
Árvácska	László Ranódy	Zsuzsa Czinkóczi, Flóra Kádár		
Fekete gyémántok	Zoltán Várkonyi	Péter Huszti, Szilvia Sunyovszky, Gábor Koncz, Péter Haumann		
Herkulesfürdői emlék	Pál Sándor	Endre Holmann, Margit Dajka, Sándor Szabó, Erzsébet Kútvölgyi	Drama	Won the Silver Bear at Berlin
Kísértet Lublón	Róbert Bán	György Cserhalmi, Dezső Garas		
A lőcsei fehér asszony	Gyula Maár	Mari Törőcsik		
Az ötödik pecsét	Zoltán Fábri	Lajos Őze, László Márkus, István Dégi, Sándor Horváth	War drama	Won the Golden Prize at Moscow and entered into Berlin
Pókfoci	János Rózsa	József Madaras, Ádám Rajhona, Judit Halász		
Talpuk alatt fütyül a szél	György Szomjas	Djoko Rosić, István Bujtor		
1977
Egy erkölcsös éjszaka	Károly Makk	Irén Psota, Margit Makay, György Cserhalmi	Comedy	Entered into the 1978 Cannes Film Festival
Ki látott engem?	György Révész	Károly Safranek		
Veri az ördög a feleségét	Ferenc András	Erzsi Pásztor, Ildikó Pécsi		
Apám néhány boldog éve	Sándor Simó	Lohinszky Loránd	Drama	Entered into the 28th Berlin International Film Festival
1978
A ménesgazda	András Kovács	József Madaras	Drama	Entered into the 29th Berlin International Film Festival
Drága kisfiam	Károly Makk			
Krétakör	Gábor Bódy	Ágnes Bánfalvy		
Magyarok	Zoltán Fábri	Gábor Koncz, Éva Pap, József Bihari		
80 huszár	Sándor Sára	László Dózsa, Géza Tordy		
1979
Magyar rapszódia	Miklós Jancsó	Lajos Balázsovits	Drama	Entered into the 1979 Cannes Film Festival
A kedves szomszéd	Zsolt Kézdi-Kovács	László Szabó, Margit Dajka	Drama	Entered into the 1979 Cannes Film Festival
Indul a bakterház	Sándor Mihályfy	Imre Olvasztó, Róbert Koltai		
Lúdas Matyi	Attila Dargay	Péter Geszti (voice), László Csákányi (voice)	Animation	
Égigérő fű	György Palásthy	János Rajz		
Családi tűzfészek	Béla Tarr	László Horváth		One of the best-known examples of the Budapest school
Little Valentino	András Jeles	János Opoczki		
Szabadíts meg a gonosztól	Pál Sándor	Dezső Garas, Irén Psota, András Kern		
Habfürdő	György Kovásznai		Animation	First feature-length musical cartoon.
The Fortress	Miklós Szinetár			Entered into the 11th Moscow International Film Festival

== 1980–1989 ==
Title	Director	Cast	Genre	Notes
1980
Bizalom	István Szabó	Ildikó Bánsági, Péter Andorai	Drama	Nominated for the Golden Bear (1981) and winner of the Best Director award at the 30th Berlin International Film Festival
Örökség	Márta Mészáros	Lili Monori	Drama	Entered into the 1980 Cannes Film Festival
Cserepek	István Gaál	Zygmunt Malanowicz	Drama	Entered into the 1981 Cannes Film Festival
Circus maximus	Géza von Radványi	Gábor Reviczky, Gábor Máté		
Csontváry	Zoltán Huszárik	Ichak Finci, Andrea Drahota, Margit Dajka		
Kojak Budapesten	Sándor Szalkay	László Inke		
Narcissus and Psyche	Gábor Bódy	György Cserhalmi, Udo Kier, Patricia Adriani	Drama	
A Pogány Madonna	Gyula Mészáros	István Bujtor, András Kern		
Színes tintákról álmodom	László Ranódy	Mari Törőcsik		
Fehérlófia	Marcell Jankovics	György Cserhalmi (voice), Vera Papp (voice), Mari Szemes (voice), Gyula Szabó (voice), Ferenc Szalma (voice), Szabolcs Tóth (voice)	Animated enthographic film, Experimental	
1981
Kopaszkutya	György Szomjas	Lóránt Schuszter, László Földes		
Köszönöm, megvagyunk	László Lugossy	József Madaras	Drama	Entered into the 31st Berlin International Film Festival
Mephisto	István Szabó	Klaus Maria Brandauer, György Cserhalmi, Krystyna Janda	Political drama	Oscar for Best Foreign Language (1982), Best script at 1981 Cannes Film Festival
Ripacsok	Pál Sándor	Dezső Garas, András Kern		
Temporary Paradise	András Kovács			Entered into the 12th Moscow International Film Festival
Vuk	Attila Dargay	László Csákányi (voice), Judit Pogány (voice)	Animated children's film	
1982
Egymásra nézve	Károly Makk	Jadwiga Jankowska-Cieślak	Drama	Jankowska-Cieślak won the award for Best Actress at the 1982 Cannes Film Festival
Az idő urai	René Laloux, Tibor Hernádi (technical director)	Jean Valmont, Michel Elias, Frédéric Legros, Yves-Marie Maurin, Monique Thierry, Sady Rebbot	Independent animated science fiction	French-Swiss-West German-British-Hungarian co-production
Dögkeselyű	Ferenc András	György Cserhalmi	Crime film	Entered into the 33rd Berlin International Film Festival
Megáll az idő	Péter Gothár	István Znamenák, Henrik Pauer, Sándor Sőth	Drama	
Panelkapcsolat	Béla Tarr	Róbert Koltai, Judit Pogány		
Macbeth	Béla Tarr	György Cserhalmi, Erzsébet Kútvölgyi, Ferenc Bencze, Imre Csuja, János Derzsi, István Dégi, Pál Hetényi, Tamás Jordán, Attila Kaszás, Gyula Maár, Đoko Rosić, József Ruszt, Géza Rácz, János Ács, Lajos Őze	Drama	
Requiem	Zoltán Fábri	Edit Frajt, Lajos Balázsovits	Drama	Won a Silver Bear at the 32nd Berlin International Film Festival
Szívzűr	Géza Böszörményi	Gábor Máté, Dorottya Udvaros		
Bors néni	György Bohák	Margit Dajka, Erzsébet Kútvölgyi		
Daliás idők	József Gémes	Gyula Szabó	Animated fantasy-adventure, Experimental	Won Best Animated Feature at the 1st Kecskeméti Animációs Filmfesztivál
1983
Visszaesők	Zsolt Kézdi-Kovács	Lili Monori, Miklós Székely B.	Romance/Drama	Entered into the 1983 Cannes Film Festival
Álombrigád	András Jeles	Ádám Szirtes, Róbert Rátonyi		Banned until 1989
Elcserélt szerelem	Sándor Szalkay	Lili Monori, Miklós B. Székely		
Hófehér	József Nepp	Judit Halász (voice), János Körmendi (voice), Ilona Béres (voice)	Animation, Experimental	
Könnyű testi sértés	György Szomjas	Mariann Erdős, Károly Eperjes	Drama	Entered into the 34th Berlin International Film Festival
Kutya éji dala	Gábor Bódy	Gábor Bódy, János Derzsi, Marietta Méhes, Attila Grandpierre		
Night Rehearsal	Miklós Szurdi			Entered into the 13th Moscow International Film Festival
Szegény Dzsoni és Árnika	András Sólyom	Tamás Puskás, Zsuzsa Nyertes, Flóra Kádár		
Te rongyos élet	Péter Bacsó	Dorottya Udvaros, Zoltán Bezerédi, László Szacsvay		
The Train Killer	Sándor Simó	Michael Sarrazin, Armin Mueller-Stahl		
Vérszerződés	György Dobray	István Bubik		
1984
Jégkrémbalett	András Wahorn	András Wahorn, László feLugossy, István ef Zámbó, Erzsébet Kukta		
Angyali üdvözlet	András Jeles	Péter Bocsor, Júlia Mérő		
Mária-nap	Judit Elek	Edit Handel, Éva Igó, Sándor Szabó	Drama	Screened at the 1984 Cannes Film Festival
Eszkimó asszony fázik	János Xantus	Linda Boguslaw, Andor Lukáts, Marietta Méhes		
Szirmok, virágok, koszorúk	László Lugossy	György Cserhalmi	Drama	Entered into the 35th Berlin International Film Festival
István, a király	Gábor Koltay	László Pelsőczy, Miklós Varga (voice), Bernadett Sára, Gyula Vikidál		
Szaffi	Attila Dargay	András Kern (voice), Judit Pogány (voice), Hilda Gobbi (voice)	Animation	
1985
Redl ezredes	István Szabó	Klaus Maria Brandauer, Flóra Kádár	Drama	Won the Jury Prize at the 1985 Cannes Film Festival
A nagy generáció	Ferenc András	György Cserhalmi, Károly Eperjes, Róbert Koltai		
Álombrigád	András Jeles	Róbert Rátonyi, Ádám Szirtes		
Egészséges erotika	Péter Tímár	Ádám Rajhona, Róbert Koltai		
Az elvarázsolt dollár	István Bujtor	István Bujtor, András Kern		
Első kétszáz évem	Gyula Maár	Zoltán Bezerédi	Drama	Entered into the 36th Berlin International Film Festival
Eszterlánc	András Péterffy	Henriette Deres		
Őszi almanach	Béla Tarr	Hédi Temessy, Miklós B. Székely, János Derzsi		
Szerelem első vérig	György Dobray	Attila Berencsi, Mariann Szilágyi		
A hajnal	Miklós Jancsó	Serge Avedikian	Drama	Entered into the 36th Berlin International Film Festival
The Red Countess	András Kovács			Entered into the 14th Moscow International Film Festival
1986
Akli Miklós	György Révész	István Hirtling, László Helyey, István Kovács, Ilus Vay		
Csongor és Tünde	Éva Zsurzs	Károly Safranek, Kati Zsurzs		
A fantasztikus nagynéni	Ilona Katkics	Éva Ruttkai, Gergely Madaras, Csaba Palóczi		
Banánhéjkeringő	Péter Bacsó	Mihály Dés, Dorottya Udvaros		
The Bride Was Beautiful	Pál Gábor	Ángela Molina, Massimo Ghini, Stefania Sandrelli	Drama	
Macskafogó	Béla Ternovszky	László Sinkó (voice), Miklós Benedek (voice)	Animation	
Hajnali háztetők	János Dömölky	Péter Andorai, György Cserhalmi		
Lutra	Mihály Hárs	Mátyás Usztics		
Idő van	Péter Gothár	Márk Zala, Kati Lázár		
1987
Az utolsó kézirat	Károly Makk	Jozef Króner, Alexander Bardini	Drama	Entered into the 1987 Cannes Film Festival
Csók, Anyu	János Rózsa	Róbert Koltai (voice), Dorottya Udvaros (voice), Péter Haumann (voice)		Entered into the 15th Moscow International Film Festival
Napló gyermekeimnek	Márta Mészáros	Zsuzsa Czinkóczi, Anna Polony, Jan Nowicki	Drama	Jury Special Prize at the 1984 Cannes Film Festival; Won the Silver Bear at Berlin
Hol volt, hol nem volt	Gyula Gazdag	Dávid Vermes, Frantisek Husák	Fantasy	
Miss Arizona	Pál Sándor	Marcello Mastroianni, Hanna Schygulla	Drama	
A másik ember	Ferenc Kósa	Ferenc Bessenyei, Károly Eperjes		
Szamárköhögés	Péter Gárdos	Dezső otharas, Judit Hernádi, Mari Törőcsik		
Szörnyek évadja	Miklós Jancsó	József Madaras, György Cserhalmi		
Tiszta Amerika	Péter Gothár	Andor Lukáts		
1988
Hanussen	István Szabó	Klaus Maria Brandauer	Drama/Biopic	Entered into the 1988 Cannes Film Festival, nominated for Golden Globe
Egy teljes nap	Ferenc Grunwalsky	Károly Nemcsák		
Eldorádó	Géza Bereményi	Károly Eperjes, Judit Pogány		
Kárhozat	Béla Tarr	Miklós B. Székely	Drama	
Küldetés Evianba	Erika Szántó	Klaus Abramowsky		
1989
Az én XX. századom	Ildikó Enyedi	Dorotha Segda	Comedy-drama	Won the Golden Camera at Cannes
Éjszaka	István Gaál	Miklós Tolnay		
Felix the Cat: The Movie	Tibor Hernádi			
A halálraítélt	János Zsombolyai	Péter Malcsiner	Drama	Entered into the 40th Berlin International Film Festival
Hagyjátok Robinsont!	Péter Tímár	István Mikó, Milagros Morales, Dezső Garas		
Ismeretlen ismerős	János Rózsa	Judit Halász, Dani Szabó		
Jesus Christ's Horoscope	Miklós Jancsó			Entered into the 16th Moscow International Film Festival
A legényanya	Dezső Garas	Károly Eperjes, Ferenc Kállai, Judit Pogány, Dezső Garas		
Mielőtt befejezi röptét a denevér	Péter Tímár	Gábor Máté	Drama	Entered into the 39th Berlin International Film Festival
Sárkány és papucs	Tibor Hernádi			
Túsztörténet	Gyula Gazdag	Attila Berencsi, Gábor Svidrony		
Vadon	Ferenc András	Gábor Reviczky, Sándor Oszter, Lajos Kovács		
Vili, a veréb	József Gémes		Animation	Won the Prize of the Audience at the 3rd Kecskeméti Animációs Filmfesztivál
