= The Poor Rich (1938 film) =

1938 film

- Directed by: Jenő Csepreghy
- Written by: István Eszterhás
- Based on: The Poor Rich by Mór Jókai
- Produced by: Miklós Szalontai Kiss
- Starring: Tivadar Uray; Zita Szeleczky; László Szilassy
- Cinematography: István Eiben
- Music by: Zoltán Kerényi
- Production company: Mester Film
- Distributed by: Danubia Pictures
- Release date: 22 December 1938
- Running time: 73 minutes
- Country: Hungary
- Language: Hungarian

The Poor Rich (Hungarian: Szegény gazdagok) is a 1938 Hungarian historical drama film directed by Jenő Csepreghy and starring Tivadar Uray, Zita Szeleczky and László Szilassy. It is based on the 1860 novel of the same title by Mór Jókai. It was subsequently remade as the 1959 film The Poor Rich. It was shot at the Hunnia Studios in Budapest. The film's sets were designed by the art director Márton Vincze. It was released in America by Danubia Pictures. It is also known by the alternative title Poor Plutocrats.

== Cast ==
- Tivadar Uray as Hátszeghy báró
- Zita Szeleczky as Lapussa Henriette
- László Szilassy as Vámhidy Szilárd
- Margit Lukács as Anica
- Béla Mihályffi as Sipos ügyvéd
- Gerö Mály as Margari, majordomo
- Piroska Vaszary as Klementin
- Sándor Pethes as Lapussa János
- Béla Fáy as Seregélyes János
- Károly Hajagos as Lakáj a bárónál
- György Hajnal as Lakáj a bárónál
- Ferenc Hoykó as Balázska, a meggyilkolt férj
- Géza Rónai as Eszéki, csendbiztos
- Margit Árpád as Lángainé Matild, Lapussa Demeter lánya

== Bibliography ==
- Juhász, István. Kincses magyar filmtár 1931-1944: az eredeti forgatókönyvből 1931 és 1944 között létrejött hazai mozgóképekről. Kráter, 2007.
- Rîpeanu, Bujor. (ed.) International Directory of Cinematographers, Set- and Costume Designers in Film: Hungary (from the beginnings to 1988). Saur, 1981.
