= Two Confessions =

1957 film

- Directed by: Márton Keleti
- Written by: György Hámos; Márton Keleti; Gábor Thurzó
- Starring: Mari Törőcsik
- Cinematography: István Pásztor
- Edited by: Sándor Zákonyi
- Release date: 1957
- Running time: 93 minutes
- Country: Hungary
- Language: Hungarian

Two Confessions (Hungarian: Két vallomás) is a 1957 Hungarian crime film directed by Márton Keleti. It was entered into the 1957 Cannes Film Festival.

== Cast ==
- Mari Törőcsik - Erzsi
- Marianne Krencsey - Ibi
- Lajos Őze - Sándor
- Kálmán Koletár - Jóska
- Ferenc Ladányi - Vincze százados
- Andor Ajtay - Biró
- Béla Barsi
- Margit Makay - Sándor nagyanyja
- Gábor Mádi Szabó - Kerékpáros rendőr
- Erzsi Máthé - Erzsi anyja
- Mária Mezei - Ibi anyja
- János Rajz - Józsi bácsi
- Nusi Somogyi
- József Timár - Vedres
- Tivadar Uray - Sándor apja
- György Bárdy - Inspector
- Gyula Benkő - Nyomozó
- Tibor Molnár
- István Szatmári - Nyomozó
