= Mária Sulyok =

Hungarian actress

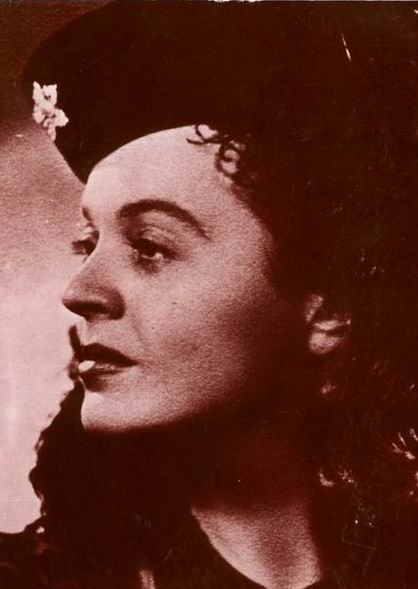
- Sulyok, c. 1935
- Born: 24 April 1908; Királyhida, Austria-Hungary
- Died: 20 October 1987 (aged 79); Budapest, Hungary
- Occupation: Actress
- Years active: 1929–1985

Mária Sulyok (24 April 1908 – 20 October 1987) was a Hungarian actress best known for her roles in A köszívü ember fiai (1965) and Love, Emilia (1968). She was born on 24 April 1908 and died on 20 October 1987 in Budapest, Hungary.

== Selected filmography ==
- Dream Love (1935)
- Devil Rider (1944)
- Strange Roads (1944)
- Mickey Magnate (1949)
- Honesty and Glory (1951)
- A Strange Marriage (1951)
- West Zone (1952)
- Accident (1955)
- A Glass of Beer (1955)
- Summer Clouds (1957)
- A Husband for Susy (1960)
- A köszívü ember fiai (1965)
- Story of My Foolishness (1966)
- Kárpáthy Zoltán (1966)
- Love, Emilia (1968)
- Mrs. Dery Where Are You? (1975)
- Yerma (1984)
