= Story of My Foolishness =

1966 film

- Directed by: Márton Keleti
- Starring: Éva Ruttkai; Lajos Básti
- Release date: 20 January 1966
- Running time: 1h 23min
- Country: Hungary
- Language: Hungarian

Story of My Foolishness (Hungarian: Butaságom története) is a 1966 Hungarian comedy film directed by Márton Keleti.

== Cast ==
- Éva Ruttkai as Kabók Kati
- Lajos Básti as Mérey László
- Irina Petrescu as Jacqueline
- László Mensáros as Forbáth György
- Manyi Kiss as Gizi néni
- Zoltán Várkonyi as Színész
- János Rajz as Kati papája
- László Kozák as Színész
- László Bánhidi as Színész
