= Samba (1996 film) =

1996 Hungarian comedy film

- Hungarian: Szamba
- Directed by: Róbert Koltai
- Screenplay by: Miklós Vámos; Andrea Vészits; Róbert Koltai
- Produced by: Péter Barbalics
- Starring: László Görög; Róbert Koltai; Éva Kerekes; Zsolt László
- Cinematography: Francisco Gózon
- Edited by: Mari Miklós
- Music by: László Dés
- Production companies: Hunnia Filmstúdió; Magic Media
- Release date: 11 April 1996 (Hungary)
- Running time: 100 minutes
- Country: Hungary
- Language: Hungarian

Samba (Hungarian: Szamba) is a 1996 Hungarian satirical comedy film directed by Róbert Koltai.

== Synopsis ==
Set in the 1970s and 80s, in communist-era Hungary, the story focuses on Ottó Szamba, the center of cultural life in a small town on the banks of the Tisza river. He organizes festivals, water races, choirs, and acting performances. All the kids in town dream of becoming an actor, except for Ottó's son, who is ashamed of his father's brash behavior. He nevertheless applies to acting school, from which he graduates. Together with his friends Géza and Éva, he joins a rural acting troupe.

== Cast ==
- László Görög as Ottó Szamba Jr.
- Róbert Koltai as Ottó Szamba
- Éva Kerekes as Éva
- Zsolt László as Géza
- Piroska Molnár as Klári, mother of Ottó Szamba Jr.
- Judit Hernádi as Jutka
- Judit Pogány as Lidi
- Andor Lukáts as Dezsö
- Tamás Jordán as head teacher
- László Helyey as speech teacher
- Pál Mácsai as chief director
- Lajos Kovács as theater director
- Ádám Rajhona as Babits
