= Gábor Mádi Szabó =

Hungarian actor

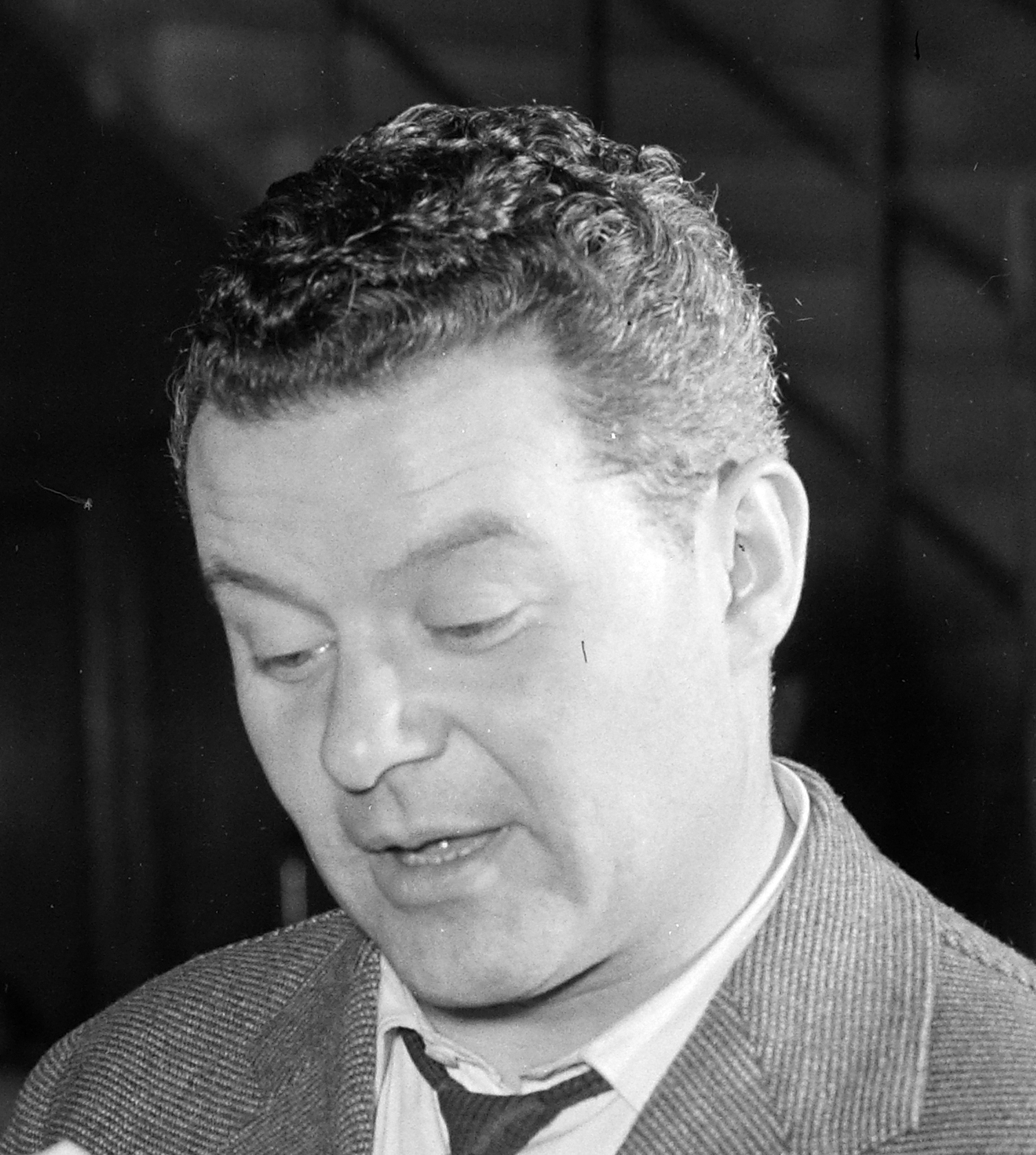
- Born: 30 August 1922; Nyíregyháza, Kingdom of Hungary
- Died: 6 March 2003 (aged 80); Budapest, Hungary

Gábor Mádi Szabó (1922–2003) was a Hungarian actor.

== Selected filmography ==
- Mrs. Szabó (1949)
- A Woman Gets a Start (1949)
- Battle in Peace (1952)
- The Sea Has Risen (1953)
- Rakoczy's Lieutenant (1954)
- Ward 9 (1955)
- Leila and Gábor (1956)
- By Order of the Emperor (1957)
- Two Confessions (1957)
- Dani (1957)
- What a Night! (1958)
- The Smugglers (1958)
- Danse Macabre (1958)
- St. Peter's Umbrella (1958)
- The Poor Rich (1959)
- I'll Go to the Minister (1962)
- Stars of Eger (1968)
