= László Helyey =

Hungarian actor

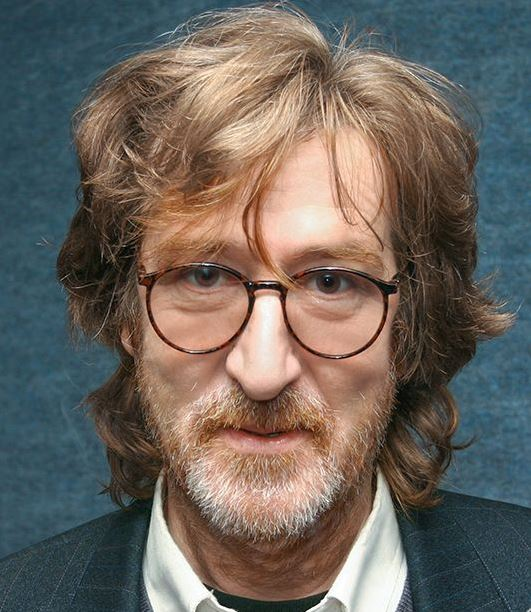
- Born: 21 May 1948; Újpest (today part of Budapest), Hungary
- Died: 3 January 2014 (aged 65); Budapest, Hungary
- Occupation: Actor
- Years active: 1968–2014

László Helyey (21 May 1948 – 3 January 2014) was a Hungarian actor.

He was the permanent Hungarian dubbing voice of Gérard Depardieu and Donald Sutherland. He also dubbed Morgan Freeman in several films.

Helyey died suddenly on January 3rd 2014. He was 65.

== Filmography ==
Year	Title	Role	Notes
1974	A törökfejes kopja	Köcsög Pista	
1974	Szikrázó lányok		
1975	Ereszd el a szakállamat!	Pócsik	
1975	Legenda a nyúlpaprikásról	Egy legény	
1975	Begstvo mistera Mak-Kinli		
1979	The Fortress	Vendég	
1982	Mátyás, az igazságos	Mátyás király	Voice
1983	Talpra, Gyözö!	Gyõzõ	
1984	Hanyatt-homlok	ügyvéd	
1984	Boszorkányszombat	óriás	
1984	Uramisten	Szilvia barátja	
1984	Bástyasétány hetvennégy	Doma Rudolf	
1984	Az élet muzsikája - Kálmán Imre	Lieder úr - a hegedümüvész	
1986	Akli Miklós	Ferenc császár	
1986	Hajnali háztetök		
1987	Moziklip	Utas a vonaton	
1987	Érzékeny búcsú a fejedelemtöl	Csáky gróf	
1989	Tanmesék a szexröl	Narrátor	
1993	We Never Die	Balogh II.	
1996	Samba	Beszédtanár	
1996	The Conquest	Oleg	
1998	A rózsa vére	Köves	Voice
1999	Glamour	Narrátor	
2000	El niño	Thief #2	Voice
2002	A hídember	Emperor Ferdinand	
2004	Magyar vándor	Mátyás király	
