= A Woman Gets a Start =

1949 film

- Directed by: Imre Jeney
- Written by: Judit Beczássy (novel); Imre Bencsik; Imre Bóka
- Produced by: József Golda
- Starring: Klári Tolnay; Ferenc Ladányi; Lajos Básti
- Cinematography: Barnabás Hegyi
- Edited by: Sándor Zákonyi
- Music by: Ferenc Farkas
- Production company: Magyar Filmgyártó Nemzeti Vállalat
- Release date: 7 October 1949
- Running time: 85 minutes
- Country: Hungary
- Language: Hungarian

A Woman Gets a Start (Hungarian: Egy asszony elindul) is a 1949 Hungarian drama film directed by Imre Jeney and starring Klári Tolnay, Ferenc Ladányi and Lajos Básti. It was shot at the Hunnia Studios in Budapest. The film's sets were designed by the art director József Pán. The director's script underwent a number of changes during shooting due to intervention by the authorities, who insisted on an espionage element to the plot.

== Synopsis ==
A woman from a middle-class background goes to work in a factory in the new Communist Hungary and proves very successful at her job. However, her husband plans to steal the secret of a new welding machine and sell it in the West.

== Cast ==
- Klári Tolnay as Bangháné, Ilonka
- Ferenc Ladányi as Bangha Kálmán, mérnök
- Zsuzsa Bánki as Marika
- Lajos Básti as Pándi Tibor
- Teri Horváth as Kati
- Gábor Mádi Szabó as Kovács, személyzetis
- Sándor Pécsi as Szekeres
- Miklós Szakáts as Miklós
- Karola Zala as Utcai árus, volt nagyságos asszony
- Róbert Dariday
- Iván Darvas
- Hilda Gobbi
- Ferenc Horváth
- László Kemény
- Sándor Kömíves
- Margit Makay
- Marcsa Simon
- Jóska Szilágyi
- Pista Szilágyi
- Tivadar Uray

== Bibliography ==
- Liehm, Mira & Liehm, Antonín J. The Most Important Art: Soviet and Eastern European Film After 1945. University of California Press, 1980.
- Ostrowska, Dorota, Pitassio, Francesco & Varga, Zsuzsanna. Popular Cinemas in East Central Europe: Film Cultures and Histories. Bloomsbury Publishing, 2017.
