= Sándor Kömíves =

Hungarian actor (1897–1980)

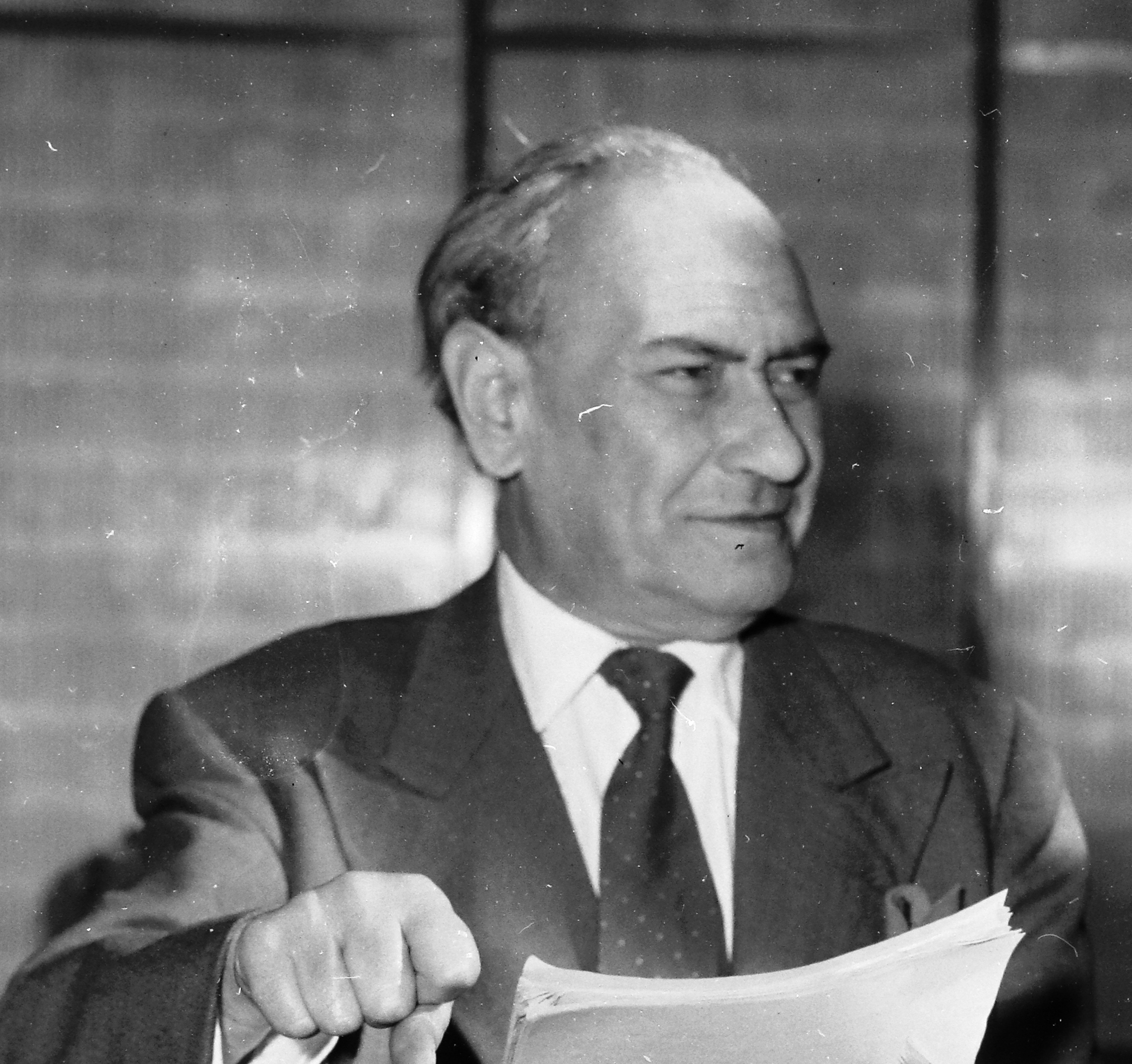
- Born: 19 March 1897; Budapest, Austria-Hungary
- Died: 13 September 1980 (aged 83); Budapest, Hungary

Sándor Kömíves (1897–1980) was a Hungarian stage, television and film actor.

== Selected filmography ==
- Gül Baba (1940)
- Sarajevo (1940)
- Silent Monastery (1941)
- Sister Beáta (1941)
- Janika (1949)
- A Woman Gets a Start (1949)
- Honesty and Glory (1951)
- Fourteen Lives (1954)
- Leila and Gábor (1956)
- Suburban Legend (1957)
- A Bird of Heaven (1958)
- The Poor Rich (1959)
- Crime at Dawn (1960)
- Land of Angels (1962)
- Bálvány (1963)
- Haladék (1980)

== Bibliography ==
- Cunningham, John. Hungarian Cinema: From Coffee House to Multiplex. Wallflower Press, 2004.
