= László Görög (actor) =

Hungarian actor

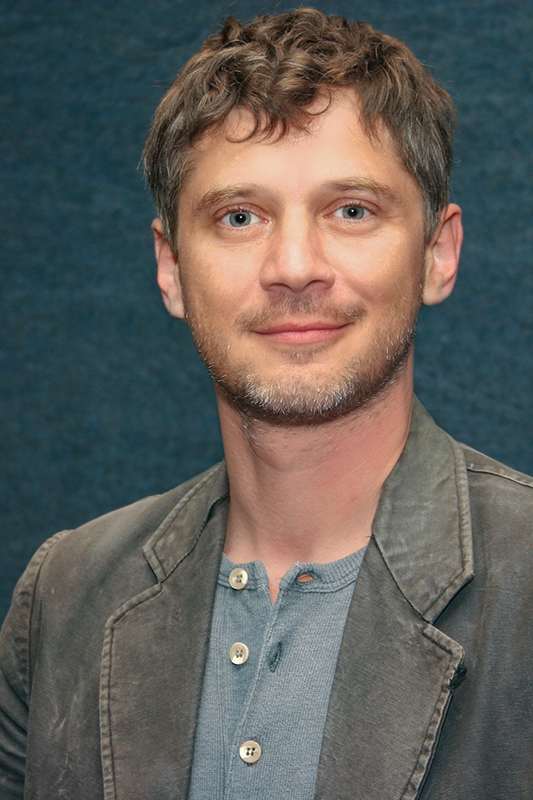
2005

László Görög (born 3 February 1964) is a Hungarian actor as well as voice actor mostly known for his roles in Samba, Argo and Jumurdzsák gyűrűje (Yoomurjak's Ring (2006).

== Early life ==
Görög was born in Debrecen.

== Notable awards ==
- Jászai Mari Award (1994)
- Napsugár-Award (2004)

== Movie roles ==
- Akli Miklós (1986)
- Laura (1987)
- Forget about me (1990)
- Homo Novus (1990)
- Szamba (1995)
- Szeressük egymást, gyerekek – A nagy agyhalál (1995)
- Franciska vasárnapjai (1996)
- Valami Amerika (2001)
- Max (2002)
- Argo (2004)
- Kész cirkusz (2005)
- Jumurdzsák gyűrűje (2005)
- A herceg haladéka (2006)
- Kútfejek (2006)
- Good (2008)
- Szinglik éjszakája (2010)

== Voice actor roles ==
- For Love or Money (Szenzációs recepciós): Doug Ireland - Michael J. Fox
- Miss Congeniality (Beépített szépség): Eric Matthews - Benjamin Bratt
- Taxi 1-4: Daniel - Samy Naceri
- Baywatch: Eddie Kramer - Billy Warlock
- Falcon Crest: Lance Cumson - Lorenzo Lamas
- The New Adventures of Robin Hood (Robin Hood legújabb kalandjai): Robin Hood - John Bradley
- Tom Jones: Tom Jones - Max Beesley
- Third Watch (Harmadik műszak): Roberto 'Bobby' Caffey - Bobby Cannavale
- Six Feet Under (Sírhant művek): David James Fisher - Michael C. Hall
- Andromeda: Seamus Harper - Gordon Michael Woolvett
- New Street Law (A jog útvesztőjében): Charlie Darling - John Thomson
- Girls in Love (Egy kamaszlány naplója): Dad - Ian Dunn
- Police Academy (Rendőrakadémia) (1.): Carey Mahoney – Steve Guttenberg
- Sherlock BBC: Dr. John Watson - Martin Freeman
- Dragon Hunters (film) (Sárkányvadászok): Gwizdo
