= Šimon Jurovský =

Slovak composer of ballet, chamber, stage and film music (1912 - 1963)

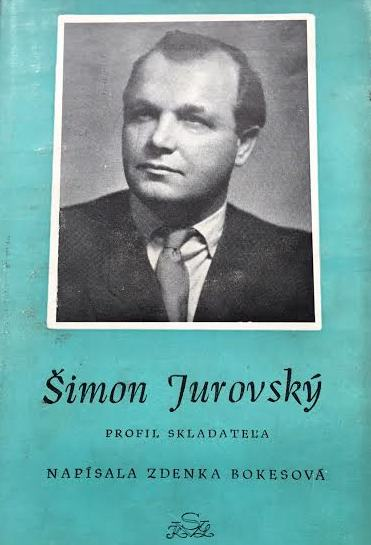
Šimon Jurovský

Šimon Jurovský, original name Shimon Weiss-Nägel (born 8 February 1912 in Olmányfalva, Besztercebánya, Kingdom of Hungary, Austria-Hungary - died 8 November 1963 in Prague, Czechoslovakia), was a Slovak composer of ballet, chamber, stage and film music.

== Biography ==
In 1928, he began studying at Teacher's College in Banská Bystrica. After completion, in 1931, he joined the Music and Dramatic Academy in Bratislava, with Professor Alexander Moyzes. He studied composition and conducting with Jozef Vincourek. From 1937 to 1939 he worked as a secretary and vertical gramophone archiver at the Slovak Radio. The radio was moved to Vienna in 1939, so there he studied composition at the Hochschule für Musik und Kunst Performing. As a conductor he performed in the teacher's choir in Bratislava (1939–1942) and the Bratislava working-class choir (1945–1947). In the meantime, he worked as musical director for the Slovak Radio, a job he had started in 1942. From 1948 to 1951 he was the head of the Slovak Radio's music department, and right after, all the way to 1955, he was the head of the music department of the Deputy of Education and Enlightenment. On 1 October 1956 he became the artistic director of the Slovak National Theatre Opera. He held this post until his death in 1963.

== Film music ==
- Unploughed Field (1953), Directed by: Vladimír Bahna
- St. Peter's Umbrella (1958)
