= Judit Hernádi =

Hungarian actress (born 1956)

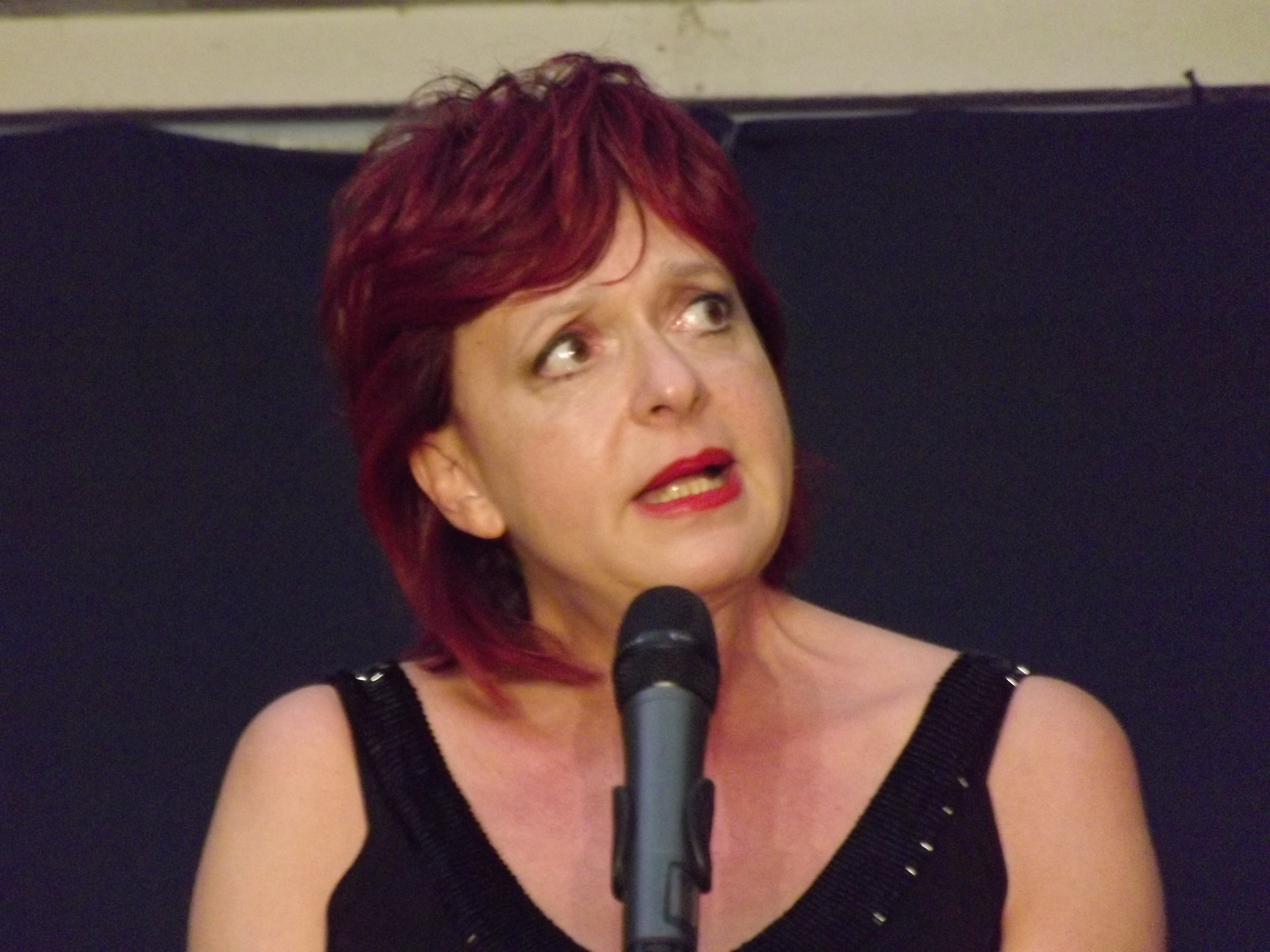
- Hernádi in 2012
- Born: 11 April 1956 (age 70); Budapest, Hungary
- Occupations: Actress; operette singer
- Years active: 1974–present
- Partner(s): Tarján Pál; Görög László (?-2003)
- Children: Tarján Zsófia Rebeka (b. 1986)
- Parent(s): Arpad Hernádi; Agnes Svoboda

Judit Hernádi (born 11 April 1956) is a Hungarian actress.

== Selected filmography ==
- The Fortress (1979)
- Mephisto (1981)
- Another Way (1982)
- The Last Manuscript (1987)
- Samba (1996)
- Out of Order (1997)
