= A Strange Mask of Identity =

1955 film by Zoltán Várkonyi

- Directed by: Zoltán Várkonyi
- Written by: Endre Vészi
- Produced by: György Zombory
- Starring: Ferenc Bessenyei; Erzsi Somogyi; Imre Sinkovits
- Cinematography: István Pásztor
- Edited by: Zoltán Kerényi
- Music by: Rezsõ Kókai
- Production company: Magyar Filmgyártó Vállalat
- Release date: 13 October 1955
- Running time: 106 minutes
- Country: Hungary
- Language: Hungarian

A Strange Mask of Identity (Hungarian: Különös ismertetőjel) is a 1955 Hungarian drama film directed by Zoltán Várkonyi and starring Ferenc Bessenyei, Erzsi Somogyi and Imre Sinkovits. The plot of the movie is set in the Hungarian communist resistance during Second World War. It was shot at the Hunnia Studios in Budapest. The film's sets were designed by the art director István Köpeczi-Boócz.

== Cast ==
- Ferenc Bessenyei as Szabó Imre
- Erzsi Somogyi as Szabóné
- Imre Sinkovits as Kóti
- Éva Ruttkai as Eszti
- Violetta Ferrari as Felhõ
- Lajos Básti as Gara
- Vera Szemere as Anna
- Gyula Gózon as Guba
- Hilda Gobbi as Sári mama
- Endre Szemethy as Zsiga bátyánk
- Tibor Molnár as Busa János
- Vanda Kátay as Busáné
- Andor Ajtay as Bajcsy-Zsilinszky Endre
- István Somló as Váraljay
- Ferenc Ladányi as Ottó
- Imre Apáthi as Barnakalapos
- Rudolf Somogyvári as Szõke Lex

== Bibliography ==
- Cunningham, John. Hungarian Cinema: From Coffee House to Multiplex. Wallflower Press, 2004.
