= Márta Fónay =

Hungarian actress (1914–1994)

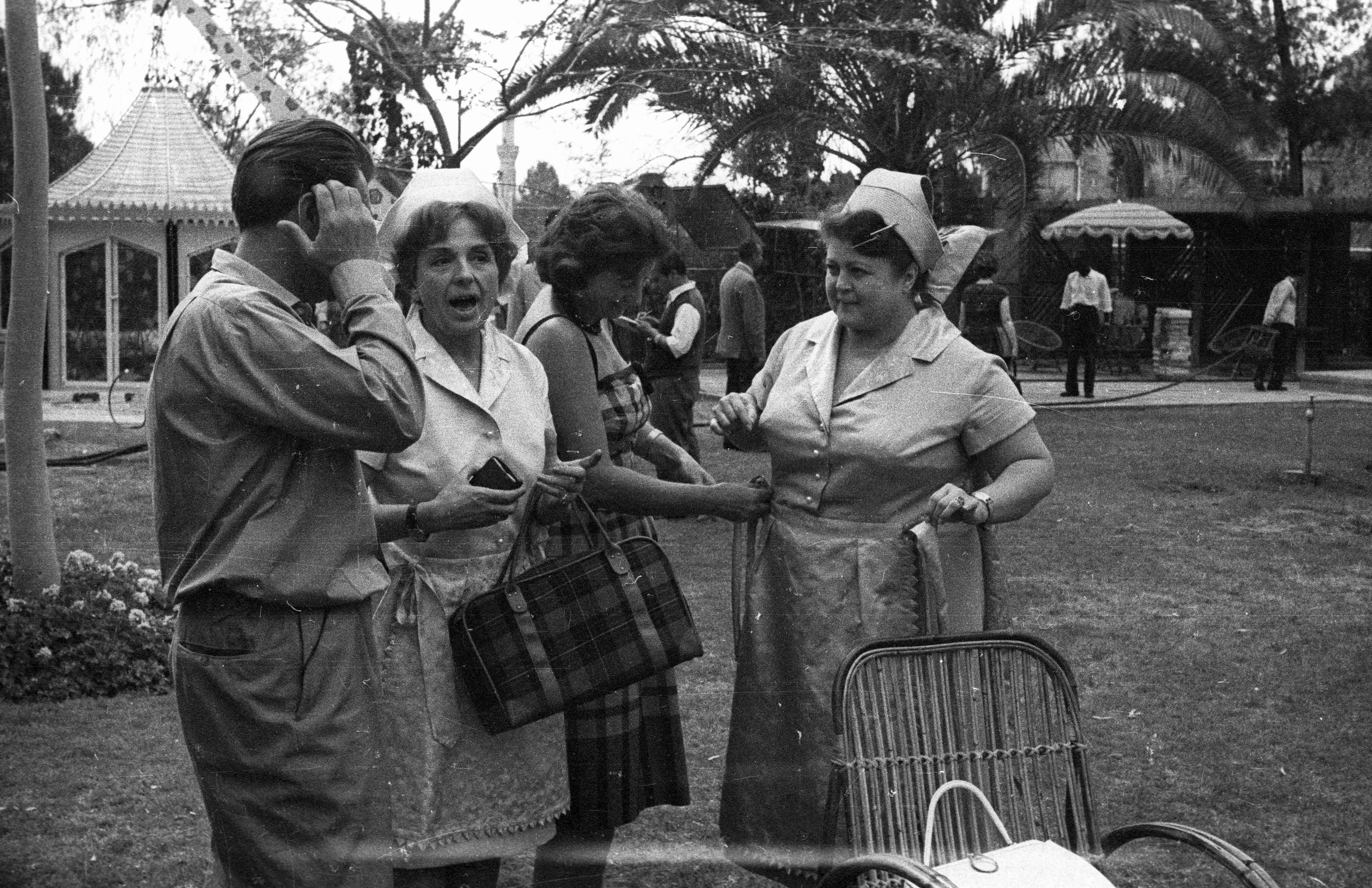
- Fónay (right) in 1962
- Born: 24 September 1914; Vác, Austro-Hungarian Empire
- Died: 22 November 1994 (aged 80); Budapest, Hungary
- Occupation: Actress
- Years active: 1937–1990 (film and TV)

Márta Fónay (24 September 1914 – 22 November 1994) was a Hungarian stage, film and television actress. A character actress, she appeared in supporting roles in a number of Hungarian films. She appeared in more than a hundred films and television productions during her long career.

== Selected filmography ==
- Viki (1937)
- Magda Expelled (1938)
- I Defended a Woman (1938)
- Strange Roads (1944)
- Janika (1949)
- Storm (1952)
- Kiskrajcár (1953)
- Young Hearts (1953)
- The State Department Store (1953)
- Love Travels by Coach (1955)
- Dollar Daddy (1956)
- The Bridge of Life (1956)
- Suburban Legend (1957)
- A Quiet Home (1958)
- What a Night! (1958)
- St. Peter's Umbrella (1958)
- A Game with Love (1959)
- Young Noszty and Mary Toth (1960)
- A Husband for Susy (1960)
- Be True Until Death (1960)
- Car Crazy (1965)
- The Toth Family (1969)

== Bibliography ==
- Goble, Alan. The Complete Index to Literary Sources in Film. Walter de Gruyter, 1999.
- Petrie, Graham. History Must Answer to Man: The Contemporary Hungarian Cinema. Corvina Kiadó, 1981.
