= St. Peter's Umbrella (1958 film) =

- Directed by: Frigyes Bán; Vladislav Pavlovič
- Written by: Kálmán Mikszáth (novel); Imre Apáthi; Frigyes Bán
- Starring: Mari Törőcsik; Sándor Pécsi; Karol Machata; János Rajz
- Cinematography: György Illés
- Edited by: Alfréd Bencic; Zoltán Kerényi
- Music by: Simon Jurovsky
- Production companies: Hunnia Filmstúdió; Studio Hraných Filmov Bratislava
- Release date: 18 December 1958
- Running time: 94 minutes
- Countries: Hungary; Czechoslovakia
- Languages: Hungarian; Slovak

St. Peter's Umbrella (Hungarian: Szent Péter esernyője, Slovak: Dáždnik svätého Petra) is a 1958 Hungarian-Czechoslovak drama film directed by Frigyes Bán and Vladislav Pavlovič and starring Mari Törőcsik, Sándor Pécsi and Karol Machata. It was based on the 1895 novel St. Peter's Umbrella by Kálmán Mikszáth which had previously been adapted into a silent film in 1917 and a sound film in 1935.

== Main cast ==
- Mari Törőcsik - Bélyi Veronika
- Sándor Pécsi - János Bélyi, plebanian
- Karol Machata - George Weebra, lawyer
- János Rajz - Paul Gregelich
- István Egri - Sztoralik, typesetter
- Gábor Mádi Szabó - Mravacsán, the mayor
- Márta Fónay - Mravacsán's wife
- Irén Psota - The "little lady"
- Nusi Somogyi - Ms. Münz
- László Márkus - A relative of the mayor
- Zsuzsa Csala - Ms. Srankó
- Karol L. Zachar - St. Peter
- Ági Margitai - Minka
