= The Bridge of Life =

1956 film

- Directed by: Márton Keleti
- Written by: Gyula Háy
- Based on: The Bridge of Life by Gyula Háy
- Produced by: László Szirtes
- Starring: János Görbe; Ági Mészáros; Zoltán Makláry
- Cinematography: György Illés
- Edited by: Sándor Zákonyi
- Music by: András Mihály
- Production company: Mafilm
- Release date: 19 January 1956
- Running time: 88 minutes
- Country: Hungary
- Language: Hungarian

The Bridge of Life (Hungarian: Az élet hídja) is a 1956 Hungarian drama film directed by Márton Keleti and starring János Görbe, Ági Mészáros and Zoltán Makláry. It was adapted by Gyula Háy from his own play of the same title. It was shot at the Hunnia Studios in Budapest. The film's sets were designed by the art director Mátyás Varga.

== Cast ==
- János Görbe as Bódog Mihály
- Ági Mészáros as Erzsi, Bódog felesége
- Zoltán Makláry as Varga
- Márta Fónay as Ilus néni
- Lili Berky as Öreg méltóságos asszony
- Irén Sütö as Anna - Pongory lánya
- Tivadar Uray as Pongory professzor
- Gyula Benkö as Pongory fia
- Lajos Rajczy as Dániel
- Tivadar Horváth as Kicskó
- Mária Mezei as Szádváryné
- Lajos Mányai as Márki
- Tibor Fehéregyházi as Varga Jani
- Ferenc Kállai as Varga Tóni
- István Somló as Võneki
- Edit Soós as Sári
- Sándor Szabó as Jánosi, fõmérnök
- Miklós Szakáts as Ernõffy
- Béla Károlyi as One of the bridge construction workers
- Gyula Bakos
- John Bartha as One of the bridge construction workers
- Katalin Berek
- József Bihari
- Andor Dárday
- János Dömsödi
- Frida Gombaszögi
- Ibolya Gábor
- Imre Halmay
- János Holl
- Mária Keresztessy
- Ervin Kibédi
- Juci Komlós
- László Kozák
- Lajos Lendvai
- János Makláry
- István Palotai
- Imre Pongrácz
- János Rajz
- István Rozsos
- Vali Rácz
- Endre Szemethy

== Bibliography ==
- Balski, Grzegorz . Directory of Eastern European Film-makers and Films 1945-1991. Flicks Books, 1992.
- Homoródy, József. Magyar film, 1948-1963. Filmtudományi Intézet, 1964.
