= Dollar Daddy =

1956 film

- Directed by: Viktor Gertler
- Written by: Szilárd Darvas; Andor Gábor; Béla Gádor
- Produced by: József Golda
- Starring: Iván Darvas; János Rajz; Erzsi Somogyi
- Cinematography: István Eiben
- Edited by: Sándor Boronkay
- Music by: Szabolcs Fényes
- Production company: Hunnia Filmstúdió
- Release date: 17 May 1956
- Running time: 92 minutes
- Country: Hungary
- Language: Hungarian

Dollar Daddy (Hungarian: Dollárpapa) is a 1956 Hungarian comedy film directed by Viktor Gertler and starring Iván Darvas, János Rajz and Erzsi Somogyi. It was a success at the Hungarian box office, drawing over three million spectators. It was shot at the Hunnia Studios in Budapest and on location around Nagykőrös. The film's sets were designed by the art director Mátyás Varga.

== Cast ==
- Iván Darvas as Dr. Jenő Szekeres
- János Rajz as Tamás Hoffmann
- Erzsi Somogyi as Mrs. Koltay
- Imre Ráday as Koltay
- Júlia Horváth as Gizi
- Rozi Gaál as Kató
- Tivadar Uray as Count
- Tivadar Horváth as Son of count
- József Timár as Mayor
- Lajos Mányai as Bottlik, banker
- Sándor Peti as Brenner, banker
- Sándor Tompa as Dr. Króny
- Tibor Benedek as Faragó
- László Bánhidi as Coachman
- István Egri as Lieutenant
- Márta Fónay as Wife of mayor
- László Hlatky as Notary
- László Kabos as Kandel Ágost, tailor
- László Kazal as Butcher
- Kálmán Koletár as Student
- Lenke Lorán as Douther of mayor
- János Makláry as Coachman
- László Misoga as Baker
- József Máriáss as Uncle Szikszai
- Imre Pongrácz as prison guard
- Ernö Szabó as Rudolf Leihner, salesman
- László Ujlaky as Minister's secretary

== Bibliography ==
- Cunningham, John. Hungarian Cinema: From Coffee House to Multiplex. Wallflower Press, 2004.
- Ostrowska, Dorota, Pitassio, Francesco & Varga, Zsuzsanna. Popular Cinemas in East Central Europe: Film Cultures and Histories. Bloomsbury Publishing, 2017.
- Rîpeanu, Bujor. (ed.) International Directory of Cinematographers, Set- and Costume Designers in Film: Hungary (from the beginnings to 1988). Saur, 1981.
