= János Rajz =

Hungarian actor

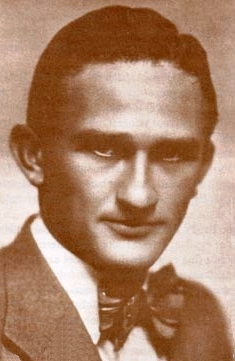
- Born: 13 February 1907; Budapest, Austria-Hungary
- Died: 20 July 1981 (aged 74); Budapest, Hungary

János Rajz (born János Reisz February 13, 1907 – July 20, 1981) was a Hungarian stage, film and television actor.

== Early life ==
Rajz was born in Budapest in 1907 and attended Hódmezővásárhely Grammar School, and had aspirations of becoming an artist. When he was 17, the director of a theater in Debrecen approached him about acting.

In 1924, he appeared onstage in Debrecen in a Viennese opera. His brother, Ferenc Rajz, was also a member of the theater.

== Career ==
Between 1929 and 1930, Rajz joined the Royal Theater. From 1930 to 1931, he appeared in plays in Bratislava; from 1931 to 1933 he appeared in plays in Kassa; from 1933 to 1939 he appeared onstage in Miskolc; from 1939 to 1940 he returned to Kassa to appear onstage; from 1940 to 1941 he appeared in plays in Pécs; from 1941 to 1943 he returned to Debrecen to appear onstage; from 1943 to 1944 he appeared in plays in Subotica; from 1944 to 1945 he returned to Debrecen; from 1945 to 1951 he performed at the National Theater in Szeged; from 1951 to 1952 he performed at the Vígszínház theater in Budapest.

Rajz won the Mari Jászai Award in 1957 and the Kossuth Prize in 1958.

He retired from the theater in 1976, after 24 years. In the same year, he founded the János Foundation.

He was involved in 86 feature films and shorts, and later, television.

In the radio broadcast "Szabó család," Razj voiced the role of Uncle Szabó from 1966 to 1981 after Ernő Szabó's death.

== Selected filmography ==
- Accident (1955)
- Ward 9 (1955)
- The Bridge of Life (1956)
- Dollar Daddy (1956)
- By Order of the Emperor (1957)
- Two Confessions (1957)
- St. Peter's Umbrella (1958)
- Iron Flower (1958)
- Don Juan's Last Adventure (1958)
- Up the Slope (1959)
- Two Half Times in Hell (1961)
- I'll Go to the Minister (1962)
- Lady-Killer in Trouble (1964)
- Three Nights of Love (1967)
- Ten Thousand Days (1967)
- Stars of Eger (1968)
- The Toth Family (1969)
