= From Blossom Time to Autumn Frost =

- Gyöngyvirágtól lombhullásig
- Directed by: István Homoki Nagy
- Written by: István Homoki Nagy
- Starring: Imre Sinkovits
- Cinematography: István Homoki Nagy
- Edited by: Mihály Morell
- Music by: Ferenc Farkas, Viktor Vaszy
- Distributed by: Magyar Híradó és Dokumentumfilmgyár, Artkino Pictures (USA)
- Release date: September 24, 1953
- Running time: 88 minutes
- Country: Hungary
- Language: Hungarian

From Blossom Time to Autumn Frost (Hungarian: Gyöngyvirágtól lombhullásig) is a 1953 Hungarian nature documentary film directed by István Homoki Nagy. The film depicts the fauna of the Gemenc forest in Hungary. It is considered one of the most popular Hungarian nature documentaries. The film was awarded a Silver Lion at the 14th Venice International Film Festival. The film features park rangers, vizslas, deer, and golden eagles.
