= Irén Psota =

Hungarian actress (1929–2016)

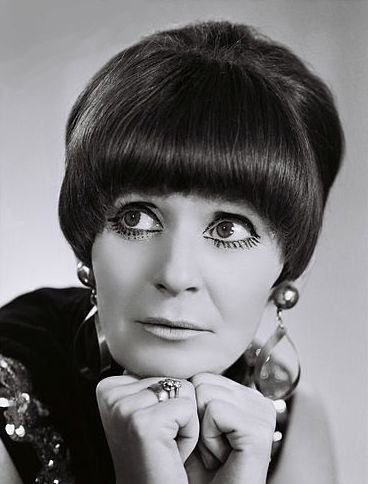
- Born: 28 March 1929; Budapest, Hungary
- Died: 25 February 2016 (aged 86); Budapest, Hungary
- Occupation: Actress

Irén Psota (28 March 1929 – 25 February 2016) was a Hungarian actress, who received two Kossuth Awards.

== Life ==
Irén Psota was born on 28 March 1929. She was a Hungarian actress and singer. Her parents were István Psota and Ilona Dávid. She graduated from the Theatre and Film Academy in 1952 and was immediately signed to Madách Theatre after her training where she played until 1980. She was working between 1980-82 at the People's Theatre, and from 1990 to 1982 to the National Theatre became a member. Following that, she returned to Madach Theatre.

== Legacy ==
During her six decade career, Irén Psota garnered critical acclaim in both classical and modern, native and foreign stage roles, and a wide range of movies and television films and her songs. She won the Kossuth Prize twice, in 1966 and 2007.

== Death ==
She died in her sleep from heart failure after a long illness at the age of 86 on 25 February 2016.

== Selected filmography ==
- A Glass of Beer (1955)
- Tale on the Twelve Points (1957)
- Játék a szerelemmel (1957)
- Felfelé a leejtőn (1958)
- A Quiet Home (1958)
- Pillar of Salt (1958)
- St. Peter's Umbrella (1958)
- The House Under the Rocks (1958)
- A Game with Love (1959)
- Up the Slope (1959)
- Crime at Dawn (1960)
- Be True Until Death (1960)
- A Husband for Susy (1960)
- Nem ér a nevem (1961)
- Házasságból elégséges (1961)
- Sunshine on the Ice (1961)
- Lopott boldogság (1962)
- Tücsök (1963)
- Az utolsó előtti ember (1963)
- Férjhez menni tilos (1964)
- Iszony (1965)
- Hideg Napok (1966)
- And Then The Guy... (1966)
- Mit csinált felséged 3-tól 5-ig? (1964)
- Az oroszlán ugrani készül (1969)
- A nagy kék jelzés (1969)
- Én vagyok Jeromos (1970)
- Csárdáskirálynő (1971)
- Ki van a tojásban? (1973)
- Csalódások (1973)
- A Very Moral Night (1977)
- Szabadíts meg a gonosztól (1979)
- Áramütés (1979)
- Vőlegény (1982)
- Eltüsszentett birodalom (1985)
- The Last Manuscript (1987)
- Erózió (1991)
- Ördög vigye (1992)
- Zsaruvér és Csigavér I.: A királyné nyakéke (2001)
- A Hold és a csillagok (2005)

== Discography ==
- Psota (1983)
- Akarsz-e játszani (1986)
- Roncsderby (1990)
- Psota, te édes - dalok (1999)
