= A Husband for Susy =

1960 film

- Directed by: Frigyes Bán
- Written by: György Hámos
- Produced by: Lajos Óvári
- Starring: Mária Sulyok; Imre Ráday; Tibor Bitskey
- Cinematography: Barnabás Hegyi
- Edited by: Sándor Boronkay
- Music by: János Gyulai-Gaál
- Production company: Hunnia Filmstúdió
- Release date: 18 August 1960
- Running time: 85 minutes
- Country: Hungary
- Language: Hungarian

A Husband for Susy (Hungarian: Rangon alul) is a 1960 Hungarian drama film directed by Frigyes Bán and starring Mária Sulyok, Imre Ráday and Tibor Bitskey. It was shot at the Hunnia Studios in Budapest. The film's sets were designed by the art director Melinda Vasáry.

== Cast ==
- Mária Sulyok as Mama, aki nem engedi
- Imre Ráday as Papa, aki szeretné
- Tibor Bitskey as Jóska, a vita egyik oka
- Ildikó Sólyom as Zsuzsa, a vita másik oka
- Irén Psota as Elza, aki a vihart felkavarja
- László Márkus as Kovács Zsombor, a villámhárító
- Márta Fónay as Egy másik mama, aki nem is sejti
- Sándor Pécsi as Egy másik papa, aki szintén szeretné
- Manyi Kiss as Róza néni, üdvöske
- Nusi Somogyi as Balogh néni, egyik cinkos
- László Misoga as Balogh bácsi, másik cinkos
- Árpád Gyenge as Operaházi bérletes
- Ervin Kibédi as Fényképész
- Mária Lázár
- Sándor Peti as Postás
- István Prókai
- Blanka Péchy
- Éva Schubert as Titkárnõ
- Erzsi Simor
- Endre Szabó
- Sándor Tompa as Igazgató
- János Körmendi as Jancsi

== Bibliography ==
- Balski, Grzegorz. Directory of Eastern European Film-makers and Films 1945–1991. Flicks Books, 1992.
- Liehm, Mira & Liehm, Antonín J. The Most Important Art: Soviet and Eastern European Film After 1945. University of California Press, 1980.
- Rîpeanu, Bujor. (ed.) International Directory of Cinematographers, Set- and Costume Designers in Film: Hungary (from the beginnings to 1988). Saur, 1981.
