= Land of Angels =

1962 film

- Directed by: György Révész
- Written by: Miklós Hubay
- Based on: Land of Angels by Lajos Kassák
- Produced by: Ottó Föld
- Starring: Tamás Végvári; Klári Tolnay; Ferenc Zenthe
- Cinematography: Ferenc Szécsényi
- Edited by: Sándor Zákonyi
- Music by: András Mihály
- Production company: Hunnia Filmstúdió
- Release date: 25 October 1962
- Running time: 99 minutes
- Country: Hungary
- Language: Hungarian

Land of Angels (Hungarian: Angyalok földje) is a 1962 Hungarian drama film directed by György Révész and starring Tamás Végvári, Klári Tolnay and Ferenc Zenthe. It was shot at the Hunnia Studios in Budapest. The film's sets were designed by the art director László Duba. It is based on a 1929 novel by Lajos Kassák and is set amongst working class inhabitants of Budapest during the Horthy era.

== Cast ==
- Tamás Végvári as Mitrovácz Miklós
- Klári Tolnay as Miklós anyja
- Ferenc Zenthe as Miklós apja
- Itala Békés
- Lajos Cs. Németh as Péter
- István Csepala as Imruska
- Gyöngyvér Demjén
- Árpád Gyenge
- László György
- Franciska Györy as Aranka
- Lajos Gárday
- Gyula Horváth
- Irén Keresztes
- Sándor Kömíves
- Erzsi Lengyel as Imre bácsi felesége
- Klári Létay
- József Madaras as Károly - zsaroló
- Zoltán Makláry as verklis
- László Misoga
- Tibor Molnár as Imre bácsi
- János Pagonyi
- József Ross
- Bertalan Solti
- Anni Soltész
- Ernö Szabó as Keresztes bácsi
- Sándor Szemere
- József Szendrõ
- József Vándor

== Bibliography ==
- Burns, Bryan. World Cinema: Hungary. Fairleigh Dickinson Univ Press, 1996.
- Liehm, Mira & Liehm, Antonín J. The Most Important Art: Soviet and Eastern European Film After 1945. University of California Press, 1980.
- Rîpeanu, Bujor. (ed.) International Directory of Cinematographers, Set- and Costume Designers in Film: Hungary (from the beginnings to 1988). Saur, 1981.
