= A Girl Danced Into His Life =

1964 film

- Hungarian: Az Életbe táncoltatott leány
- Directed by: Tamás Banovich
- Written by: Tamás Banovich
- Starring: Adél Orosz
- Cinematography: Ferenc Szécsényi
- Edited by: Zoltán Kerényi
- Music by: Tihamér Vujicsics
- Production company: Mafilm
- Release date: 26 November 1964
- Running time: 80 minutes
- Country: Hungary
- Language: Hungarian

A Girl Danced Into His Life (Hungarian: Az Életbe táncoltatott leány) is a 1964 Hungarian musical film directed by Tamás Banovich. It was entered into the 1965 Cannes Film Festival where it won a Technical Prize.

== Cast ==
- Adél Orosz - A lány
- Levente Sipeki - A fiú
- György Bárdy - Black Man
- Irma Vass - (as Vas Irma)
- Tamás Major - Képmutogató
- Hilda Gobbi - A Képmutogató felesége
- Zsolt Galántai - A Képmutogató fia
