= László Mensáros =

Hungarian actor

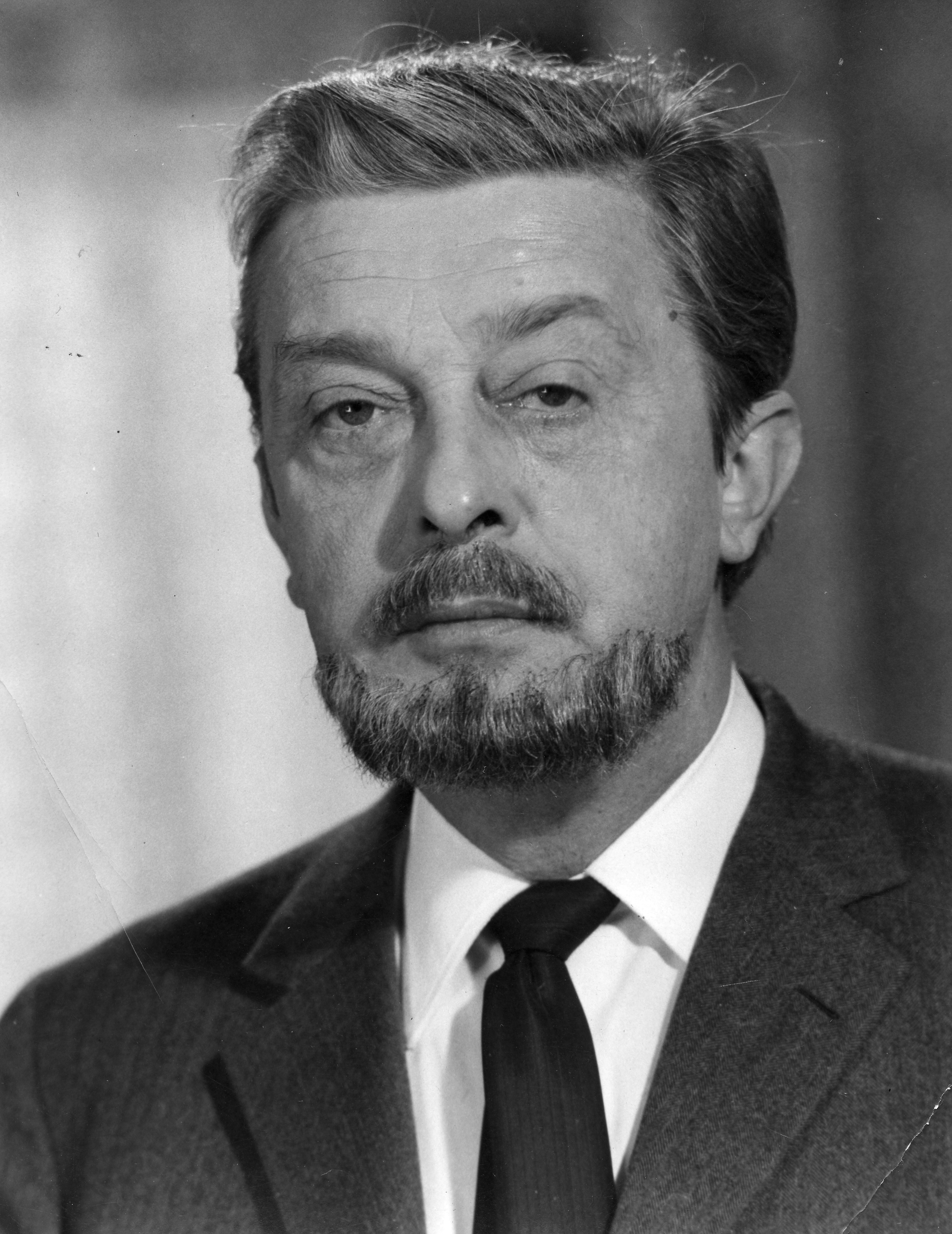
- Mensáros in 1970.
- Born: January 26, 1926; Budapest, Hungary
- Died: February 7, 1993 (aged 67); Budapest, Hungary
- Occupation: Actor
- Years active: 1956–1993 (film)
- Spouse(s): Juhász Juditot (1947-1958) (divorced) (3 children); Mikes Gabriella (1968-1989) (her death)
- Children: Péter; Zsuzsa; Tamás
- Relatives: dr. Springer Ferenc (grandfather)

László Mensáros (1926–1993) was a Hungarian film, stage and television actor. After making his film debut in Professor Hannibal (1956), he acted prolifically in films and television with over more than a hundred and fifty appearances on screen.

== Selected filmography ==
- Professor Hannibal (1956)
- Summer Clouds (1957)
- A Game with Love (1959)
- Story of My Foolishness (1966)
- Walls (1968)
- Love (1971)
- 141 Minutes from the Unfinished Sentence (1975)
- The Last Manuscript (1987)

== Bibliography ==
- Cowie, Peter & Elley, Derek. World Filmography: 1967. Fairleigh Dickinson University Press, 1977.
- Hames, Peter. The Cinema Of Central Europe. Wallflower Press, 2004.
