= Relatives (1954 film) =

1954 film

- Directed by: Félix Máriássy
- Written by: István Thurzó
- Based on: Relatives by Zsigmond Móricz
- Produced by: László Szirtes
- Starring: László Ungváry; Klári Tolnay; Gábor Rajnay
- Cinematography: István Eiben
- Edited by: Zoltán Kerényi
- Music by: Tibor Polgár
- Production company: Magyar Filmgyártó Állami Vállalat
- Release date: 28 October 1954
- Running time: 102 minutes
- Country: Hungary
- Language: Hungarian

Relatives (Hungarian: Rokonok) is a 1954 Hungarian drama film directed by Félix Máriássy and starring László Ungváry, Klári Tolnay and Gábor Rajnay. It was shot at the Hunnia Studios in Budapest. The film's sets were designed by the art director Mátyás Varga. It is based on a novel by Zsigmond Móricz, which was later remade as a 2006 film.

== Cast ==
- László Ungváry as Kopjáss István
- Klári Tolnay as Lina, Kopjássné
- Gábor Rajnay as Polgármester
- Sándor Pécsi as Kardics
- Tivadar Uray as Miniszter
- Hédi Temessy as Magdaléna
- Hilda Gobbi as Kati néni
- Gyula Gózon as Berci bácsi
- Gyula Benkö as Titkár
- József Timár as Martiny dr.

== Bibliography ==
- Liehm, Mira & Liehm, Antonín J. The Most Important Art: Soviet and Eastern European Film After 1945. University of California Press, 1980.
