= Leila and Gábor =

1956 film

- East German poster
- Directed by: László Kalmár
- Written by: József Babay
- Based on: Gül Baba by Ferenc Martos
- Produced by: Jenõ Katona
- Starring: Ferenc Zenthe; Marianne Krencsey; Imre Sinkovits
- Cinematography: Jean Badal
- Edited by: Zoltán Kerényi
- Music by: Jenö Huszka
- Production company: Magyar Filmgyártó Vállalat
- Distributed by: Progress Film
- Release date: 19 April 1956
- Running time: 95 minutes
- Country: Hungary
- Language: Hungarian

Leila and Gábor (Hungarian: Gábor diák) is a 1956 Hungarian historical musical film directed by László Kalmár and starring Ferenc Zenthe, Marianne Krencsey and Imre Sinkovits. An operetta film, it is inspired by the 1905 stage work Gül Baba composed by Jenő Huszka. It was shot at the Hunnia Studios in Budapest. The film's sets were designed by the art director Mátyás Varga. It was the most popular film released in the 1950s with more than six million and eight hundred thousand spectators attending screenings.

== Cast ==
- Ferenc Zenthe as Gábor
- Marianne Krencsey as Leila
- Imre Sinkovits as Suki Balázs
- Margit Andaházy as Veronika
- Sándor Kömíves as Gül Baba
- Zoltán Greguss as Ali pasa
- Sándor Tompa as Zülfilkár
- György Bárdy as Ali's Man
- Vilmos Komlós as Uzsorás
- Árpád Latabár as Török zarándok
- Gábor Mádi Szabó as Budai bíró
- John Bartha as Gül Baba's servant of African descent

== Bibliography ==
- Cunningham, John. Hungarian Cinema: From Coffee House to Multiplex. Wallflower Press, 2004.
- Ostrowska, Dorota, Pitassio, Francesco & Varga, Zsuzsanna. Popular Cinemas in East Central Europe: Film Cultures and Histories. Bloomsbury Publishing, 2017.
