= Miklós Szinetár =

Hungarian film director

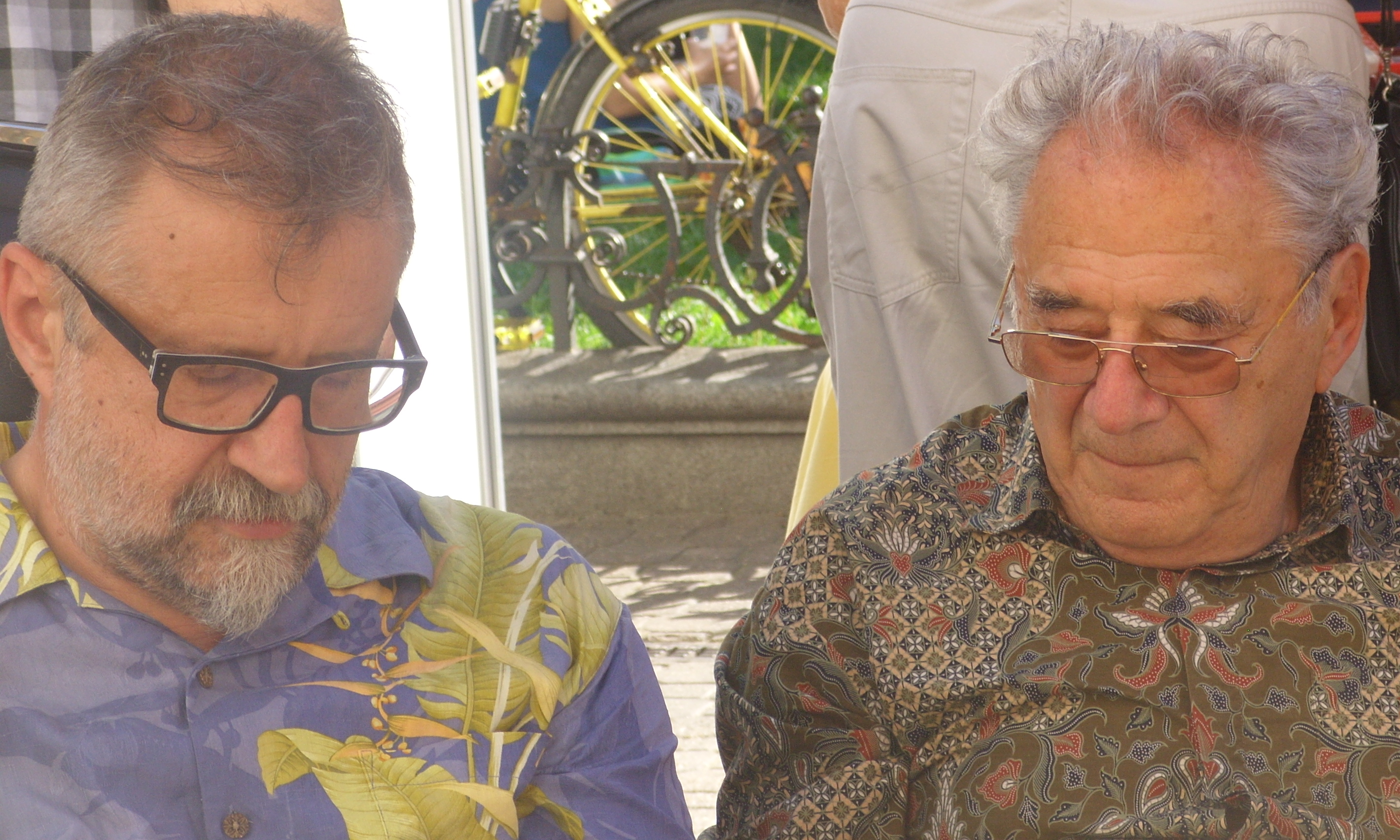
- Szinetár (right) in 2015.
- Born: 8 February 1932 (age 94); Budapest, Hungary
- Occupations: Film director; screenwriter
- Years active: 1962–1991

Miklós Szinetár (born 8 February 1932) is a Hungarian film director and screenwriter. He directed more than 20 films between 1962 and 1991. His 1979 film The Fortress was entered into the 11th Moscow International Film Festival.

== Filmografía seleccionada ==
- Háry János (1965)
- La fortaleza (1979)

"El castillo de Barbazul" (1981)
