= Semmelweis (1952 film) =

1952 film

- Directed by: Frigyes Bán
- Written by: Sándor Dallos; András Kovács
- Produced by: Ferenc Pless
- Starring: Imre Apáthi; Margit Thurzó; Tivadar Uray
- Cinematography: István Pásztor
- Music by: András Mihály
- Release date: 2 October 1952
- Running time: 105 minutes
- Country: Hungary
- Language: Hungarian

Semmelweis is a 1952 Hungarian historical drama film directed by Frigyes Bán and starring Imre Apáthi, Margit Thurzó and Tivadar Uray. It is based on the life of the pioneering nineteenth-century doctor Ignaz Semmelweis. The film's sets were designed by art director József Pán.

== Cast ==
- Imre Apáthi as Semmelweis Ignác
- Margit Thurzó as Wágner Kriszta
- Tivadar Uray as prof. Klein
- Jenõ Horváth as prof. Hebra
- József Timár as prof. Rakitansky
- István Egri as prof. Skoda
- Lajos Pándy as Markusovszky Lajos
- Sándor Deák as Balassa clinician
- Iván Darvas as prof. Michaelis
- Juci Komlós as Mrs.Semmelweis
- Erzsi Balogh as Mrs.Hebra
- László Ungváry as Dr. Scanzoni
- Tibor Molnár as Hamerlin
- Tivadar Bilicsi as Hammer coachman
- István Csók as Báthory assistant lecturer
- Gyula Justh as Heiczman selectman
- Gusztáv Vándory as Major seneschal

== Bibliography ==
- Cunningham, John. Hungarian Cinema: From Coffee House to Multiplex. Wallflower Press, 2004.
