= The Poor Rich (1959 film) =

1959 film

- Directed by: Frigyes Bán
- Written by: Frigyes Bán
- Based on: The Poor Rich by Mór Jókai
- Produced by: Ottó Elek
- Starring: Gyula Benkö; Marianne Krencsey; Margit Bara
- Cinematography: György Illés
- Edited by: Zoltán Kerényi
- Music by: Rezsõ Kókai
- Production company: Hunnia Filmstúdió
- Release date: 24 December 1959
- Running time: 104 minutes
- Country: Hungary
- Language: Hungarian

The Poor Rich (Hungarian: Szegény gazdagok) is a 1959 Hungarian historical drama film directed by Frigyes Bán and starring Gyula Benkö, Marianne Krencsey and Margit Bara. It is based on the 1860 novel of the same title by Mór Jókai which had previously been adapted into a 1938 film version The Poor Rich. It was shot at the Hunnia Studios in Budapest and on location around Fertőrákos and Pilisborosjenő. The film's sets were designed by the art director Béla Zeichan. It is also known by the alternative title Fatia Negra.

== Cast ==
- Gyula Benkö as baron Hátszegi / Fatia Negra
- Marianne Krencsey as Henriette
- Margit Bara as Anica
- József Láng as Vámhidy Szilárd
- Gábor Mádi Szabó as Juan
- Sándor Deák as Onuc
- István Egri as Sztrakovics Gerzson
- Vera Faragó as Mariora, Juan's wife
- Ila Lóth as Clementina
- Jenõ Horváth as Orthodox pries
- László Csorba as Kálmán
- László Hlatky as Margari
- Lajos Kelemen as Ripa
- László Kemény as Lapussa Demeter
- Károly Kovács as Sipos lawyer
- Sándor Kömíves as Doctor
- Árpád Téry as Lapussa János
- Teri Náray as innkeeper's wife
- Etelka Selényi as widow Mrs. Lángai

== Bibliography ==
- Balski, Grzegorz . Directory of Eastern European Film-makers and Films 1945-1991. Flicks Books, 1992.
- Cunningham, John. Hungarian Cinema: From Coffee House to Multiplex. Wallflower Press, 2004.
- Liehm, Mira & Liehm, Antonín J. The Most Important Art: Soviet and Eastern European Film After 1945. University of California Press, 1980.
