= Summer Clouds (1957 film) =

1957 film

- Directed by: Zoltán Fábri
- Written by: Ferenc Karinthy (novel); Gábor Thurzó
- Produced by: István Lénárt
- Starring: Marianne Krencsey; László Mensáros; Mária Sulyok
- Cinematography: Ferenc Szécsényi
- Edited by: Ferenc Szécsényi
- Music by: György Ránki
- Production company: Hunnia Filmstúdió
- Release date: 6 August 1957
- Running time: 95 minutes
- Country: Hungary
- Language: Hungarian

Summer Clouds (Hungarian: Bolond április) is a 1957 Hungarian romantic comedy film directed by Zoltán Fábri and starring Marianne Krencsey, László Mensáros and Mária Sulyok. It was shot at the Hunnia Studios in Budapest.

== Genre ==
Comedy, romance

== Production ==
The Summer Clouds film was directed by; Zoltán Fábri. Written by; Ferenc Karinthy and Gábor Thurzó produced by István Lénárt. The film was filmed in Hungary by the production company Hunnia filmstúdió.

== Cast ==
- Marianne Krencsey as Katinka
- László Mensáros as Gida
- Mária Sulyok as Mrs. Kristóf
- Ági Mednyánszky as Zsuzsi
- Tibor Sallay as Béla
- Gyula Bakos as Dr. Bertalan
- Noémi Apor as Gizi
- Gábor Rajnay as Police captain
- Antal Farkas as Policeman
- Éva Vadnai as Lady on the street
- Sándor Suka as Sztetelay
- Dezsö Garas as University student
- János Horkay as Passenger

== Bibliography ==
- Balski, Grzegorz . Directory of Eastern European Film-makers and Films 1945-1991. Flicks Books, 1992.
- Wakeman, John. World Film Directors: 1945-1985. H.W. Wilson, 1987.
