= The Toth Family =

1969 film

- Directed by: Zoltán Fábri
- Written by: István Örkény; Zoltán Fábri
- Starring: Zoltán Latinovits
- Cinematography: György Illés
- Release date: 29 November 1969
- Running time: 95 minutes
- Country: Hungary
- Language: Hungarian

The Toth Family (Hungarian: Isten hozta, őrnagy úr!) is a 1969 Hungarian comedy-drama film directed by Zoltán Fábri. It was entered into the 7th Moscow International Film Festival.

== Cast ==
- Zoltán Latinovits as Major (Őrnagy)
- Imre Sinkovits as Tót Lajos, fire-chief
- Márta Fónay as Mariska, Tót's wife
- Vera Venczel as Ágika, Tót's daughter
- Antal Páger as Tónay, parson
- István Dégi as Gyuri, the postman
- János Rajz as Sóskúti, machinist
