= Ferenc Ladányi =

Hungarian actor (1909–1965)

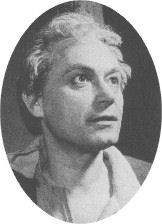
- Born: 3 December 1909; Debrecen, Austro-Hungarian Empire
- Died: 10 March 1965 (aged 55); Budapest, Hungary
- Occupation: Actor
- Years active: 1945–1965 (film)

Ferenc Ladányi (1909–1965) was a Hungarian stage, television and film actor. He was a winner of the Kossuth Prize.

== Selected filmography ==
- The Schoolmistress (1945)
- Tüz (1948)
- A Woman Gets a Start (1949)
- Singing Makes Life Beautiful (1950)
- Underground Colony (1951)
- A Strange Mask of Identity (1955)
- Two Confessions (1957)
- Pillar of Salt (1958)
- Yesterday (1959)
- The Bells Have Gone to Rome (1959)

== Bibliography ==
- Petrie, Graham. History Must Answer to Man: The Contemporary Hungarian Cinema. Corvina Kiadó, 1981.
