= Lady-Killer in Trouble =

1964 film

- Directed by: Viktor Gertler
- Written by: Ágnes Fedor (novel); Imre Bencsik; Anna Borhy; Nándor Kovács
- Starring: Sándor Pécsi; Dezső Garas; Mária Mezei
- Cinematography: Ottó Forgács
- Edited by: Sándor Boronkay
- Music by: Szabolcs Fényes
- Production company: Hunnia Filmgyár
- Release date: 20 August 1964
- Running time: 71 minutes
- Country: Hungary
- Language: Hungarian

Lady-Killer in Trouble (Hungarian: Özvegy menyasszonyok) is a 1964 Hungarian comedy crime film directed by Viktor Gertler and starring Sándor Pécsi, Dezső Garas and Mária Mezei. It was shot at the Hunnia Studios in Budapest. The film's sets were designed by the art director László Duba.

== Synopsis ==
A police detective investigating the case of a taxi driver who has disappeared finds no less than six different women claiming to be the vanished man's fiancee.

== Cast ==
- Sándor Pécsi as police major Péter Kovács
- Dezsö Garas as József Kormos
- János Rajz as Pál Kalocsai
- Mária Mezei as Marianne
- Erzsi Máthé as Zsuzsa
- Zsuzsa Gordon as Klári
- László Bánhidi as Gál
- Éva Vadnai as Tolmács
- Vera Szemere as Mrs. Péter Kovács
- Irén Sütő as Éva Gajdán
- Ilus Vay as Jusztínia
- Edit Soós as Ica
- Itala Békés as Krisztina
- Sándor Szakács as Hadai
- Erzsi Pásztor as Etelka
- Juci Komlós as Éva Gajdán's boss
- Mária Keresztessy as Mrs. Gál
- Ilona Dajbukát
- Kati Böröndi
- Zsuzsa Balogh
- Erzsi Galambos
- Endre Csonka
- László Egri
- László Forgács
- Pál Keresztes
- József Konrád
- Géza Márky
- István Prókai
- Péter Pusztai
- Ildikó Sólyom

== Bibliography ==
- Balski, Grzegorz. Directory of Eastern European Film-makers and Films 1945-1991. Flicks Books, 1992.
- Liehm, Mira & Liehm, Antonín J. The Most Important Art: Soviet and Eastern European Film After 1945. University of California Press, 1980.
- Rîpeanu, Bujor. (ed.) International Directory of Cinematographers, Set- and Costume Designers in Film: Hungary (from the beginnings to 1988). Saur, 1981.
