= Juci Komlós =

Hungarian actress (1919–2011)

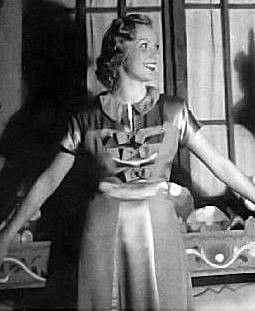
- Komlós in 1937
- Born: 10 February 1919; Subotica, Hungary (now Serbia)
- Died: 5 April 2011 (aged 92); Budapest, Hungary
- Occupation: Actress
- Years active: 1936–1999
- Partner: Géza Földessy
- Children: Margit Földessy

Juci Komlós (10 February 1919 – 5 April 2011) was a Hungarian film actress. She is best known for her performance as Lenke Takács in Szomszédok. She was the daughter of the actor Vilmos Komlós.

== Selected filmography ==
- The Marriage of Katalin Kis (1950)
- Semmelweis (1952)
- Storm (1952)
- The Bridge of Life (1956)
- Lady-Killer in Trouble (1964)
