= I'll Go to the Minister =

- Directed by: Frigyes Bán
- Written by: Zoltán Galabárdi; Miklós Markos
- Starring: László Bánhidi; Antal Páger; János Rajz; Gyula Gózon
- Cinematography: Ferenc Szécsényi
- Edited by: Mihály Morell
- Music by: Iván Patachich
- Production company: Hunnia Filmstúdió
- Release date: 15 February 1962
- Running time: 100 minutes
- Country: Hungary
- Language: Hungarian

I'll Go to the Minister (Hungarian:Felmegyek a miniszterhez) is a 1962 Hungarian comedy film directed by Frigyes Bán and starring László Bánhidi, Antal Páger and János Rajz.

== Cast ==
- László Bánhidi - Parlag Antal
- Antal Páger - Balogh Bódog
- János Rajz - Nyóca, elnök
- Gyula Gózon - Zsüle
- Gábor Mádi Szabó - Tanácselnök
- József Horváth - Mester
- Ádám Szirtes - Miniszter
- Ferenc Zenthe - Illés Vadász
- Itala Békés - Juli, Bódog felesége
- Sándor Tompa - Esperes
- Antal Farkas - Orbán, Tûzoltóparancsnok
- Éva Schubert - Dizõz
