= Géza Tordy =

Hungarian actor (1938–2024)

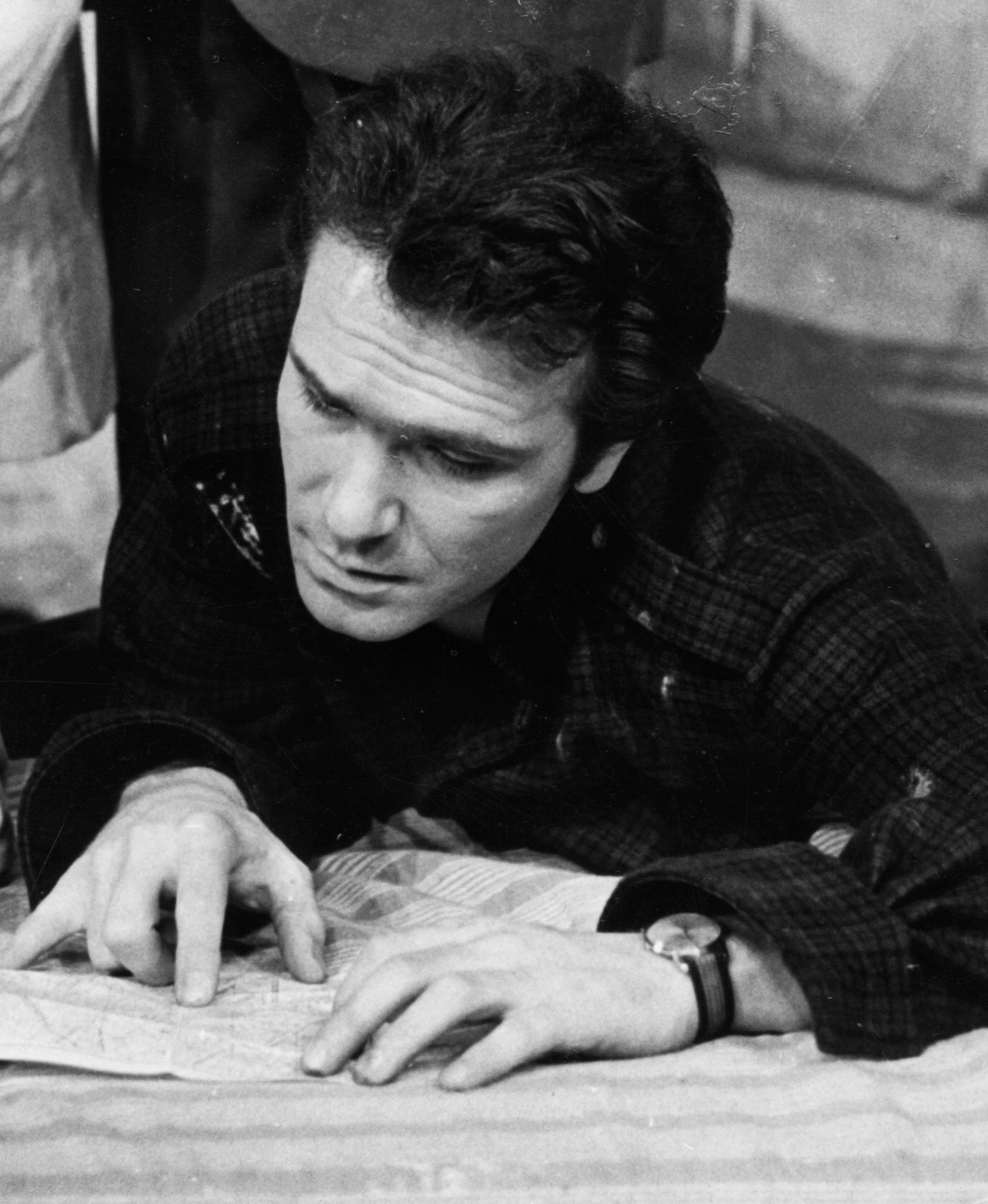
- Tordy in 1968
- Born: 1 May 1938; Budapest, Kingdom of Hungary
- Died: 30 March 2024 (aged 85); Budapest, Hungary
- Occupation: Actor

Géza Tordy (1 May 1938 – 30 March 2024) was a Hungarian actor. Tordy was born in Budapest on 1 May 1938, and died on 30 March 2024, at the age of 85.

== Selected filmography ==
- Suburban Legend (1957)
- Pillar of Salt (1958)
- For Whom the Larks Sing (1959)
- Sleepless Years (1959)
- Danger on the Danube (1961)
- Kárpáthy Zoltán (1966)
- A Handful of Heroes (1967)
- Szerelmi álmok – Liszt (1970)
- Stars of Eger (1968)
- The Train Killer (1983)
- The Red Countess (1985)
- A három testör Afrikában (1996)
- Perlasca, un Eroe Italiano (2002)
- Hadik (2023)

== Bibliography ==
- Burns, Bryan. World Cinema: Hungary. Fairleigh Dickinson University Press, 1996.
