= A Game with Love =

1959 film

- Directed by: Imre Apáthi
- Written by: Imre Apáthi; Miklós Gyárfás
- Produced by: András Németh
- Starring: László Mensáros; Irén Psota; Ferenc Kiss
- Cinematography: Félix Bodrossy
- Edited by: Zoltán Kerényi
- Music by: Szabolcs Fényes
- Production company: Budapest Filmstúdió
- Release date: 30 July 1959
- Running time: 93 minutes
- Country: Hungary
- Language: Hungarian

A Game with Love (Hungarian: Játék a szerelemmel) is a 1959 Hungarian romantic comedy film directed by Imre Apáthi and starring László Mensáros, Irén Psota and Ferenc Kiss. It was shot at the Hunnia Studios in Budapest. The film's sets were designed by the art director Ferenc Ruttka.

== Synopsis ==
In the eyes of the Gods of Olympus love on earth is in a desperate state. To prove his worth, Cupid is sent to restore the marriage of a quarrelling couple.

== Main cast ==
- László Mensáros as Török István
- Margit Németh as Erzsike, wife of Török István
- Irén Psota as Mende Klárika
- László Hlatky as Korom Bertalan
- Ferenc Kiss as Jupiter
- Róbert Rátonyi as Mercury
- Ernö Szabó as apiary director
- Károly Tóth-Réti as Cupid
- Ferenc Zentai as chief engineer
- Márta Fónay as Erzsike' mutter

== Bibliography ==
- Cunningham, John. Hungarian Cinema: From Coffee House to Multiplex. Wallflower Press, 2004.
- Rîpeanu, Bujor. (ed.) International Directory of Cinematographers, Set- and Costume Designers in Film: Hungary (from the beginnings to 1988). Saur, 1981.
