= A Quiet Home =

1958 film

- Directed by: Frigyes Bán
- Written by: Armand Szántó; Mihály Szécsén
- Produced by: Ottó Föld
- Starring: Ferenc Zenthe; Erzsi Galambos; Irén Psota
- Cinematography: István Eiben
- Edited by: Mihály Morell
- Music by: Szabolcs Fényes
- Production company: Mafilm
- Distributed by: Mokép
- Release date: 20 February 1958
- Running time: 85 minutes
- Country: Hungary
- Language: Hungarian

A Quiet Home (Hungarian: Csendes otthon) is a 1958 Hungarian comedy film directed by Frigyes Bán and starring Ferenc Zenthe, Erzsi Galambos and Irén Psota. It was shot at the Hunnia Studios in Budapest. The film's sets were designed by the art director István Básthy. It was one of the most popular Hungarian films of the era, drawing more than three and a half million spectators.

== Main cast ==
- Ferenc Zenthe as András, aki lakást kapott
- Erzsi Galambos as Éva, szintén lakást kapott
- László Ungváry as Huppert, aki ennek örül
- Irén Psota as Gabi, aki kevésbé örül
- István Egri as Bakos, aki egyáltalán nem örül
- István Nagy as Tiszteletes
- Sándor Peti as Csapó
- Márta Fónay as Mama, aki nem tehet róla
- Erzsi Kõmíves as Csapóné, aki nem tehet róla
- Ervin Kibédi as Alkalmi tanú

== Bibliography ==
- Balski, Grzegorz. Directory of Eastern European Film-makers and Films 1945-1991. Flicks Books, 1992.
- Ostrowska, Dorota, Pitassio, Francesco & Varga, Zsuzsanna. Popular Cinemas in East Central Europe: Film Cultures and Histories. Bloomsbury Publishing, 2017.
