= Ward 9 (film) =

1955 film

- Directed by: Károly Makk
- Written by: Tibor Méray
- Produced by: József Golda; Lajos Gulyás
- Starring: Marianne Krencsey; Tibor Molnár; Zoltán Makláry
- Cinematography: György Illés
- Edited by: Mihály Morell
- Music by: Ottó Vincze
- Production company: Magyar Filmgyártó Állami Vállalat
- Release date: 10 November 1955
- Running time: 106 minutes
- Country: Hungary
- Language: Hungarian

Ward 9 (Hungarian: A 9-es kórterem) is a 1955 Hungarian drama film directed by Károly Makk and starring Marianne Krencsey, Tibor Molnár and Zoltán Makláry. It was shot at the Hunnia Studios in Budapest. The film's sets were designed by the art director Mátyás Varga.

== Cast ==
- Marianne Krencsey as Margó
- Tibor Molnár as Tóth Gáspár
- Zoltán Makláry as Varga professzor
- Iván Darvas as Sós doktor
- Miklós Gábor as Málnási doktor
- Andor Ajtay as Láng professzor
- Mária Sívó as Emmike
- Zsuzsa Zolnay as Eszter, mütõsnõ
- Vera Szemere as Tóthné
- Zsuzsa Simon as Wéber doktornõ
- László Bánhidi as Beteg
- János Dömsödi as Igazgató
- Tibor Fehéregyházi as Beteg
- László Hlatky as Beteg
- Gábor Mádi Szabó as Balázsi Béla
- Piri Peéry as Barta Gáborné személyzeti elõadó
- Blanka Péchy as Mária, hivatalos beteglátogató
- Lajos Rajczy as Beteg
- János Rajz as Beteg
- András Tassy as Portás
- József Timár as Beteg
- János Horkay as Sofõr

== Bibliography ==
- Cunningham, John. Hungarian Cinema: From Coffee House to Multiplex. Wallflower Press, 2004.
- Hames, Peter (ed.) The Cinema of Central Europe. Wallflower Press, 2004.
- Liehm, Mira & Liehm, Antonín J. The Most Important Art: Soviet and Eastern European Film After 1945. University of California Press, 1980.
- Rîpeanu, Bujor. (ed.) International Directory of Cinematographers, Set- and Costume Designers in Film: Hungary (from the beginnings to 1988). Saur, 1981.
