= Péter Haumann =

Hungarian actor (1941–2022)

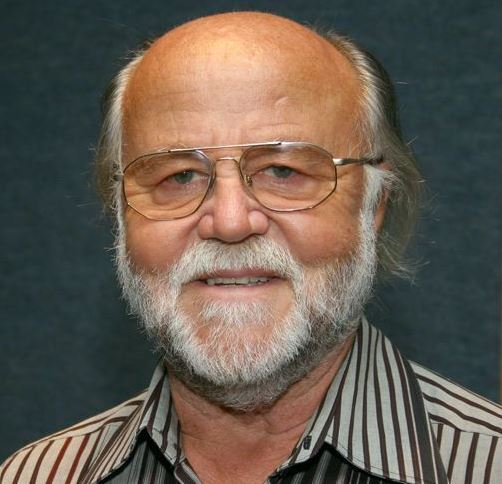
- Born: 17 May 1941; Budapest, Hungary
- Died: 28 May 2022 (aged 81); Budapest, Hungary
- Occupation: Actor
- Years active: 1962–2021

Péter Haumann (17 May 1941 – 28 May 2022) was a Hungarian actor. He appeared in more than one hundred films since 1962.

== Selected filmography ==
Year	Title	Role	Notes
1967	Ten Thousand Days	Policeman	
1979	The Fortress	Steko	
1986	Cat City	Safranek	
1994	Woyzeck	Doctor	
1998	Passion	The lawyer	
2005	Fateless	Lajos bácsi	
2006	Children of Glory	Feri bácsi	
2008	Kalandorok	Grandpa	
2017	Jupiter's Moon	Zentai	
