= Szilvia Sunyovszky =

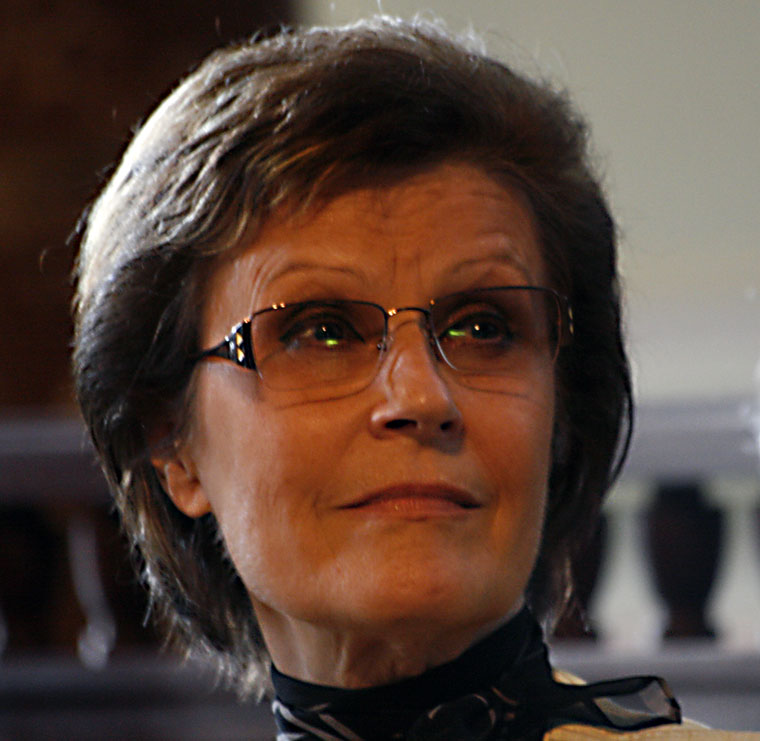
Szilvia Sunyovszky, 2010

Szilvia Sunyovszky (born February 2, 1948) award-winning Hungarian film and stage actress.

She was born in Rožňava, Czechoslovakia, in the area called "Uplands" (Horná zem) of Slovakia inhabited mainly by Hungarians.

After the fall of Communism in Hungary she ended her acting career and engaged in public activities.

== Awards ==
- 1986: Jászai Mari Award
- 1998: Honorary Citizen of Rožňava
- 2013: Honorary title Merited Artist of Hungary
- 2016: Officer's Cross of the Hungarian Order of Merit
- 2020: Kossuth Prize

== Personal life ==
Her first husband was the TV film director Sándor G. Szőnyi, while her second husband was György Fekete, the president of the Hungarian Academy of Arts.
