= Zoltán Kerényi =

Hungarian film editor

- Born: 21 June 1909; Budapest, Austro-Hungarian Empire
- Died: 11 May 1971 (aged 61); Budapest, Hungary
- Occupations: Editor, Director
- Years active: 1939–1969 (film)

Zoltán Kerényi (1909–1971) was a Hungarian film editor. He edited over a hundred films and also directed two.

== Selected filmography ==
- Sarajevo (1940)
- Dankó Pista (1940)
- Semmelweis (1940)
- Mirage by the Lake (1940)
- Silenced Bells (1941)
- Flames (1941)
- Prince Bob (1941)
- Left-Handed Angel (1941)
- One Night in Transylvania (1941)
- Kádár Versus Kerekes (1942)
- People of the Mountains (1942)
- Lóránd Fráter (1942)
- Katyi (1942)
- Male Fidelity (1942)
- At the Crossroads (1942)
- Magdolna (1942)
- I Am Guilty (1942)
- Deadly Kiss (1942)
- The Song of Rákóczi (1943)
- The Night Serenade (1943)
- Black Dawn (1943)
- Mouse in the Palace (1943)
- Siamese Cat (1943)
- Loving Hearts (1944)
- Boy or Girl? (1944)
- After the Storm (1945)
- Without Lies (1946)
- The Land Is Ours (1951)
- Déryné (1951)
- Storm (1952)
- West Zone (1952)
- Under the City (1953)
- Young Hearts (1953)
- Relatives (1954)
- A Strange Mask of Identity (1955)
- Love Travels by Coach (1955)
- Leila and Gábor (1956)
- Suburban Legend (1957)
- A Bird of Heaven (1958)
- St. Peter's Umbrella (1958)
- A Game with Love (1959)
- The Poor Rich (1959)
- A Girl Danced Into His Life (1964)
- Three Nights of Love (1967)

== Bibliography ==
- Cowie, Peter & Elley, Derek . World Filmography: 1967. Fairleigh Dickinson University Press, 1977.
- Hames, Peter (ed.) The Cinema of Central Europe. Wallflower Press, 2004.
