= Tivadar Uray =

Hungarian actor

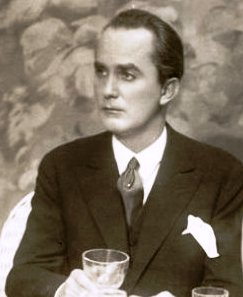
- Born: 9 November 1895; Munkács, Kingdom of Hungary, Austria-Hungary (now Mukachevo, Ukraine)
- Died: 22 June 1962 (aged 66); Mukachevo, Ukrainian SSR, Soviet Union (now Ukraine)
- Occupation: Actor
- Years active: 1917–1962

Tivadar Uray (9 November 1895 – 22 June 1962) was a Hungarian film actor. He appeared in more than 40 films between 1917 and 1962. He was born and died in Munkács, Hungary (now Mukachevo, Ukraine).

== Selected filmography ==
- The Red Samson (1917)
- The Charlatan (1917)
- Mary Ann (1918)
- Neither at Home or Abroad (1918)
- The New Landlord (1935)
- Salary, 200 a Month (1936)
- It Was Me (1936)
- The Golden Man (1936)
- Hotel Springtime (1937)
- The Mysterious Stranger (1937)
- Help, I'm an Heiress (1937)
- The Poor Rich (1938)
- The Five-Forty (1939)
- Everybody Loves Someone Else (1940)
- Semmelweis (1940)
- A Heart Stops Beating (1942)
- The Dance of Death (1942)
- A Woman Gets a Start (1949)
- A Strange Marriage (1951)
- Déryné (1951)
- Semmelweis (1952)
- West Zone (1952)
- Erkel (1952)
- Relatives (1954)
- Dollar Daddy (1956)
- The Bridge of Life (1956)
- Two Confessions (1957)
- Fever (1957)
- Young Noszty and Mary Toth (1960)
