= Suburban Legend =

1957 film

- Directed by: Félix Máriássy
- Written by: Judit Máriássy
- Produced by: György Zombory
- Starring: Mari Törőcsik; Géza Tordy; Manyi Kiss
- Cinematography: István Eiben
- Edited by: Zoltán Kerényi
- Music by: Imre Vincze
- Production company: Hunnia Filmgyár
- Release date: 28 November 1957
- Running time: 82 minutes
- Country: Hungary
- Language: Hungarian

Suburban Legend (Hungarian: Külvárosi legenda) is a 1957 Hungarian drama film directed by Félix Máriássy and starring Mari Törőcsik, Géza Tordy and Manyi Kiss. It was shot at the Hunnia Studios in Budapest. The film's sets were designed by the art director Melinda Vasáry.

== Cast ==
- Mari Törőcsik as Benkõné, Annus
- Géza Tordy as Ambrus Pista
- Manyi Kiss as Nyanya
- Erzsi Máthé as Teruska
- Imre Sinkovits as Benkõ
- László Bánhidi as Gondnok úr
- Márta Fónay as Horváth néni
- Hilda Gobbi as Virágárus
- László Kozák as Felügyelõ
- Endre Harkányi as Jenõ
- Sándor Kömíves as István Ambrus
- Sándor Peti as Villamosvezetõ
- János Makláry as Kovács bácsi

== Bibliography ==
- Liehm, Mira & Liehm, Antonín J. The Most Important Art: Soviet and Eastern European Film After 1945. University of California Press, 1980.
- Slater, Thomas J. Handbook of Soviet and East European Films and Filmmakers. Bloomsbury Academic, 1992.
