= The Last Manuscript =

1987 film

- Directed by: Károly Makk
- Written by: Tibor Déry; Zoltán Kamondi; Károly Makk
- Starring: Jozef Króner
- Release date: 19 November 1987
- Running time: 107 minutes
- Country: Hungary
- Language: Hungarian

The Last Manuscript (Hungarian: Az utolsó kézirat) is a 1987 Hungarian drama film directed by Károly Makk. It was entered into the 1987 Cannes Film Festival.

== Cast ==
- Jozef Króner - György Nyáry
- Aleksander Bardini - Márk (as Aleksander Bardin)
- Eszter Nagy-Kálózy - Flóra
- Irén Psota - Vica - Mrs. Nyáry
- Béla Both - Franz
- Hédi Váradi - Emilia
- Gyula Babos
- János Bán
- László Dés
- Judit Hernádi
- László Mensáros - György Nyáry (voice)
