= Young Noszty and Mary Toth (1960 film) =

1960 film

- Directed by: Viktor Gertler
- Written by: Gábor Thurzó
- Based on: Young Noszty and Mary Toth by Kálmán Mikszáth
- Produced by: József Bajusz
- Starring: Tivadar Uray; Károly Mécs; Marianne Krencsey
- Cinematography: István Pásztor
- Edited by: Mária Szécsényi
- Music by: Ottó Vincze
- Production company: Hunnia Filmstúdió
- Release date: 24 November 1960
- Running time: 96 minutes
- Country: Hungary
- Language: Hungarian

Young Noszty and Mary Toth (Hungarian: A Noszty fiú esete Tóth Marival) is a 1960 Hungarian historical romantic comedy film directed by Viktor Gertler and starring Tivadar Uray, Károly Mécs and Marianne Krencsey. It is based on the 1909 novel of the same title by Kálmán Mikszáth, previously made into the 1938 film Young Noszty and Mary Toth. It was shot at the Hunnia Studios in Budapest. The film's sets were designed by the art director József Romvári. It was one of the most popular films of the era in Hungary, during more than three and half million admissions at the box office.

== Cast ==
- Tivadar Uray as Noszty Pál
- Károly Mécs as Noszty Feri
- Marianne Krencsey as Noszty Vilma
- Antal Páger as Tóth Mihály
- Márta Fónay as Mrs. Tóth Mihály
- Ilona Petényi as Tóth Mari
- László György as Kopereczky
- Mária Mezei as Mrs Homlódy
- Sándor Pécsi as Pázmár dr.
- Karola Csürös as Rozál
- Károly Kovács as Palojtay
- Miklós Szakáts as Colonel Stromm
- Flórián Kaló as Kozsehuba
- Gyula Bodrogi as Malinka

== Bibliography ==
- Goble, Alan. The Complete Index to Literary Sources in Film. Walter de Gruyter, 1999.
- Ostrowska, Dorota, Pitassio, Francesco & Varga, Zsuzsanna. Popular Cinemas in East Central Europe: Film Cultures and Histories. Bloomsbury Publishing, 2017.
- Rîpeanu, Bujor. (ed.) International Directory of Cinematographers, Set- and Costume Designers in Film: Hungary (from the beginnings to 1988). Saur, 1981.
