= Gyula Benkő =

Hungarian actor

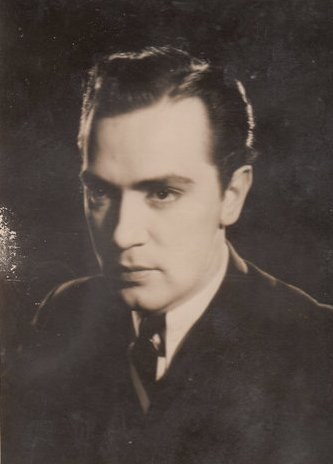
- Born: 22 August 1918; Budapest, Austria-Hungary
- Died: 30 June 1997 (aged 78); Budapest, Hungary
- Years active: 1938–1997 (film & TV)

Gyula Benkő (August 22, 1918 – June 30, 1997) was a Hungarian actor and father of actor Péter Benkő.

== Selected filmography ==
- Hungary's Revival (1939)
- Europe Doesn't Answer (1941)
- Don't Ask Who I Was (1941)
- The Gyurkovics Boys (1941)
- Three Bells (1941)
- Magdolna (1942)
- Dr. Kovács István (1942)
- Cadet Love (1942)
- Sabotage (1942)
- We'll Know By Midnight (1942)
- I Am Guilty (1942)
- Mouse in the Palace (1943)
- Loving Hearts (1944)
- Devil Rider (1944)
- Half a Boy (1944)
- Prophet of the Fields (1947)
- Hot Fields (1949)
- Gala Suit (1949)
- A Strange Marriage (1951)
- Underground Colony (1951)
- West Zone (1952)
- Young Hearts (1953)
- Relatives (1954)
- Keep Your Chin Up (1954)
- The Bridge of Life (1956)
- Up the Slope (1959)
- The Poor Rich (1959)
- Guns and Doves (1961)
- Two Half-Times in Hell (1961)
- Férjhez menni tilos! (1964)
- The Testament of Aga Koppanyi (1967)
- Stars of Eger (1968)
- A Very Moral Night (1977)
- The Fortress (1979)
- The Wondrous Voyage of Kornel Esti (1995)
