= The Fortress (1979 film) =

1979 film

- Directed by: Miklós Szinetár
- Written by: Gyula Hernádi; Miklós Szinetár
- Starring: Bella Tanay
- Cinematography: Miklós Bíró
- Release date: August 1979
- Running time: 122 minutes
- Country: Hungary
- Language: Hungarian

The Fortress (Hungarian: Az erőd) is a 1979 Hungarian science fiction film directed by Miklós Szinetár. It was entered into the 11th Moscow International Film Festival.

== Cast ==
- Bella Tanay as Edit Nicharchos
- Sándor Oszter as Gregor
- József Madaras as Murketa
- Ádám Rajhona as Sorensen
- Ferenc Bács as Dobrowski
- Gyula Benkő as Bondy Sr.
- Péter Benkő as Bondy Jr. (as Péter Benkő)
- Georgiana Tarjan as Éva (as Györgyi Tarján)
- Nóra Németh as Jane
- Judit Hernádi as Klotild
- Péter Haumann as Steko
- Endre Harkányi as Steiner
- Péter Trokán as Public Prosecutor
