= Ernő Szabó =

Hungarian actor

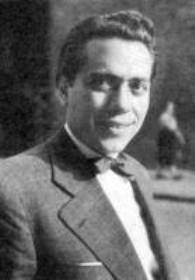
Ernő Szabó

Ernő Szabó (June 30, 1900 – November 10, 1966) was a Hungarian film actor.

== Partial filmography ==
- Dollar Daddy (1956) - Leihner Rudolf, kereskedő
- Tanár úr, kérem... (1956) - Antikvárius
- Professor Hannibal (1956) - Nyúl Béla
- Adventure in Gerolstein (1957) - Árgus rendőrfőnök
- Fever (1957) - Alexárd
- Bolond április (1957)
- Iron Flower (1958) - Fischer
- La belle et le tzigane (1958) - Rezeda
- What a Night! (1958) - Huffnágel Jenő
- Razzia (1958)
- Don Juan's Last Adventure (1958)
- Up the Slope (1959) - Főkönyvelő
- Álmatlan évek (1959)
- Kard és kocka (1959) - Pöschl írnok
- Bogáncs (1959) - Oszkár
- A Game with Love (1959) - A méhészet igazgatója
- Szerelem csütörtök (1959)
- Pár lépés a határ (1959) - Schönfeld
- Virrad (1960)
- Három csillag (1960) - Színész
- Égrenyíló ablak (1960) - Festő
- Két emelet boldogság (1960) - Varga, házmester
- Füre lépni szabad (1960) - Utas a vonaton
- Az arc nélküli város (1960) - Vészi
- Nem ér a nevem (1961)
- Jó utat, autóbusz (1961) - Patak Feri bácsi
- Házasságból elégséges (1962) - Körmendi, Árpi apja
- Áprilisi riadó (1962)
- Land of Angels (1962) - Keresztes bácsi
- Fagyosszentek (1962)
- The Man of Gold (1962) - Ali Csorbadzsi
- Párbeszéd (1963) - Ezredes
- Fotó Háber (1963)
- Új Gilgames (1964) - Sonneborn, könyvárus
- Ha egyszer húsz év múlva (1964)

== Bibliography ==
- Cunningham, John. Hungarian Cinema: From Coffee House to Multiplex. Wallflower Press, 2004.
