= Marianne Krencsey =

Hungarian actress (1931–2016)

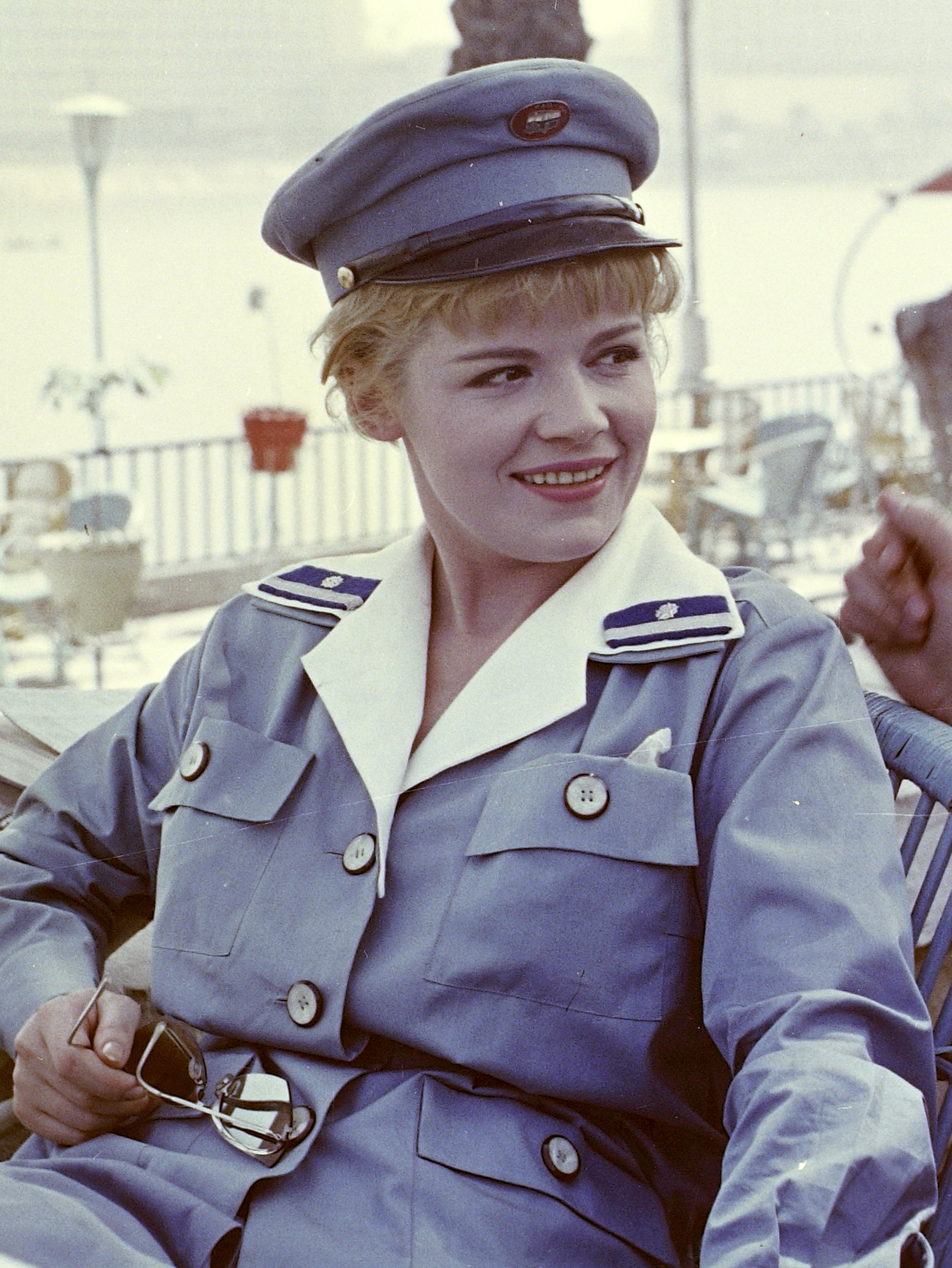
- Krencsey in 1962
- Born: 9 July 1931; Rákoscsaba, Hungary
- Died: 30 March 2016 (aged 84); New York City, US
- Occupation: Actress
- Years active: 1954–1966

Marianne Krencsey (9 July 1931 – 30 March 2016) was a Hungarian stage, film and television actress.

== Life and career ==
Born on 9 July 1931 in Rákoscsaba, Krencsey graduated as a theater director, but she was eventually mainly active as an actress thanks to her breakthrough performance in the 1954 Károly Makk's drama film Liliomfi. Also active on stage and on television, in 1966 she married her second husband, moving to the United States and basically retiring from acting.

In 2008 Krencsey received the Officer's Cross of the Order of Merit of the Hungarian Republic.

== Selected filmography ==
- Ward 9 (1955)
- Leila and Gábor (1956)
- Summer Clouds (1957)
- The Poor Rich (1959)
- Young Noszty and Mary Toth (1960)
