= Lajos Básti =

Hungarian actor

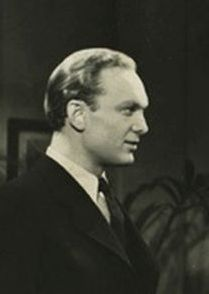
- Born: 17 November 1911; Keszthely, Austria-Hungary
- Died: 1 June 1977 (aged 65); Budapest, Hungary
- Occupation: Actor
- Years active: 1935-1977

Lajos Básti (17 November 1911 – 1 June 1977) was a Hungarian actor. He appeared in more than sixty films from 1935 to 1977.

== Selected filmography ==
Year	Title	Role	Notes
1935	St. Peter's Umbrella	Wibra György	
1965	Story of My Foolishness	Mérey László	
1966	Zoltán Kárpáthy	Wesselényi Miklós	
1970	Szerelmi álmok – Liszt	Ágoston Trefort	
