= List of highest-grossing films in Hungary =

The following is a list of highest-grossing films in Hungary.

== List ==
=== Films ===
The following are the films with the most admissions in Hungary since 1990 as of 26 Aug 2026.

Background colour indicates films currently in cinemas. Years in brackets are the years of re-release.

Rank	Title	Country	Tickets sold	Year
1	Avatar	(United States) (United Kingdom)	1,254,599	2009 (2022)
2	Star Wars: Episode I – The Phantom Menace	(United States)	1,251,531	1999 (2012)
3	Star Wars: The Force Awakens	(United States)	1,239,116	2015
4	How Could I Live Without You?	(Hungary)	1,083,186	2024
5	Titanic	(United States)	1,082,803	1998 (2012, 2023)
6	Look Who's Talking	(United States)	1,062,120	1990
7	Harry Potter and the Philosopher's Stone	(United States) (United Kingdom)	1,034,441	2001
8	Avatar: The Way of Water	(United States)	1,003,564	2022
9	Jurassic Park	(United States)	983,422	1993 (2013)
10	Star Wars: The Last Jedi	(United States)	909,571	2017
11	Avengers: Endgame	(United States)	891 143	2019 (2026)
12	Star Wars: Episode II – Attack of the Clones	(United States)	812,130	2002
13	The Lord of the Rings: The Fellowship of the Ring	(United States) (New Zealand)	805,085	2002
14	Look Who's Talking Too	(United States)	802,980	1991
15	Terminator 2: Judgment Day	(United States)	792,231	1991
16	Independence Day	(United States)	778,475	1996
17	Mamma Mia!	(United States) (United Kingdom) (Germany)	775,703	2008
18	The Lion King	(United States)	775,176	1994
19	Shrek 2	(United States)	771,221	2004
20	Zootopia 2	(United States)	765,284	2025
21	The Lost World: Jurassic Park	(United States)	757,952	1997
22	The Flintstones	(United States)	746,865	1994
23	Gladiator	(United States) (United Kingdom)	746,460	2000
24	Shrek the Third	(United States)	740,526	2007
25	Minions	(United States)	737,599	2015
26	Gone Running	(Hungary)	739,346	2024
27	The Lord of the Rings: The Return of the King	(United States) (New Zealand) (Germany)	728,383	2004
28	Star Wars: The Rise of Skywalker	(United States)	719,829	2019
29	Star Wars: Episode III – Revenge of the Sith	(United States)	714,670	2005
30	The Lord of the Rings: The Two Towers	(United States) (New Zealand)	709,262	2003
31	Rogue One: A Star Wars Story	(United States)	700,252	2016

=== Films produced in Hungary ===
==== 1990–present ====
The following are the Hungarian films with the most admissions in Hungary since 1990 as of 26 Aug 2026.

Background colour indicates films currently in cinemas

Rank	Title	Tickets sold	Year
1	How Could I Live Without You?	1,083,186	2024
2	Gone Running	739,346	2024
3	Out of Order	662,963	1997
4	Children of Glory	544,235	2006
5	A Kind of America	529,187	2002
6	The Conquest	504,747	1996
7	Dollybirds	502,787	1997
8	Hungarian Vagabond	460,565	2004
9	Kincsem – Bet on Revenge	456,448	2017
10	Fateless	452,136	2005
11	A Kind of America 2.	448,738	2008
12	Just Sex and Nothing Else	437,638	2005
13	A Kind of America 3.	373,147	2018
14	Semmelweis	348,209	2023
15	The Whiskey Bandit	332,863	2017
16	The Dream Car	308,787	2000
17	Glass Tiger 2.	304,123	2006
18	Feels Like Home	297,268	2026
19	Glass Tiger 3.	295,366	2010
20	The Bridgeman	294,427	2002
21	Catcher: Cat City 2	290,169	2007
22	Happy New Year	274,358	2018
23	Kontroll	269,312	2003
24	Son of Saul	269,020	2015
25	One Skirt and a Pair of Trousers	268,340	2005
26	Hyppolit	260,490	1999
27	Sacra Corona	256,341	2001
28	SOS Love!	238,986	2007
29	Professor Albeit	238,605	1998
30	Passionate Women	237 650	2025
31	Three Guardsmen in Africa	228,233	1996
32	Made in Hungaria	227,675	2009
33	Pappa Pia	227,228	2017
34	Fake Doll	223,421	1991
35	May Day Mayhem!	218,137	2001
36	Hungarian Wedding	217,854	2026
37	Train Keeps A Rollin	216,450	2007
38	We Never Die	209,790	1993
39	Relatives	202,853	2006
40	9 ½ Dates	202,485	2008
41	Bachelor Party	202,133	2025
42	Sunshine	201,692	2000

==== 1948–1987 ====
The following are the Hungarian films with the most admissions in Hungary between 1948 and 30 June 1987.

Rank	Title	Tickets sold (in millions)	Year	Genre
1	Mickey Magnate	9.853	1949	operetta
2	Leila and Gábor	7.323	1956	operetta
3	Rakoczy's Lieutenant	7.298	1954	youth film
4	The State Department Store	6.684	1953	musical comedy
5	Liliomfi	6.646	1955	classical
6	The Man of Gold	6.602	1962	classical
7	2×2 néha 5	6.390	1955	musical comedy
8	Keep Your Chin Up	6.362	1954	comedy
9	The Poor Rich (or Poor Plutocrats)	5.895	1959	classical
10	Love Travels by Coach	5.390	1955	musical comedy
11	Déryné	5.301	1951	drama
12	Goose-boy	5.095	1950	classical
13	A kőszívű ember fiai I.^{1}	4.612	1965	classical
14	A kőszívű ember fiai II.	4.612	1965	classical
15	Try and Win	4.568	1952	comedy
16	Stars of Eger I.^{1}	4.559	1968	classical
17	Stars of Eger II.	4.559	1968	classical
18	A Strange Marriage	4.459	1951	classical
19	Merry-Go-Round	4.192	1956	drama
20	St. Peter's Umbrella	4.191	1958	classical
21	A Glass of Beer	4.066	1955	drama
22	A Quiet Home	3.993	1958	comedy
23	Young Noszty and Mary Toth	3.851	1960	classical
24	Janika	3.831	1949	comedy
25	Sunday Romance	3.815	1957	drama
26	Adventure in Gerolstein	3.741	1957	operetta
27	Be True Until Death	3.728	1960	classical
28	Úri muri	3.605	1950	classical
29	Egy magyar nábob^{2}	3.572	1966	classical
30	Zoltán Kárpáthy	3.572	1966	classical
31	The Corporal and the Others	3.391	1965	comedy
32	Kölyök	3.277	1959	comedy
33	Dollar Daddy	3.231	1956	satire
34	Kiskrajcár	3.193	1953	drama
35	Sparrows are Birds Too	3.159	1969	comedy
36	Tale on the Twelve Points	3.026	1957	comedy
37.	Accident	2.989	1955	drama
38.	What a Night!	2.957	1958	drama
39.	Me and My Grandfather	2.914	1954	drama
40.	The Boys of Paul Street	2.912	1969	classical
41.	Mici néni két élete	2.909	1963	comedy
42.	Up the Slope	2.863	1959	comedy
43.	The Testament of Aga Koppanyi	2.849	1967	adventure
44.	Springtime in Budapest	2.820	1955	drama
45.	The Sea Has Risen	2.813	1953	historical
46.	Don't Keep Off the Grass	2.793	1960	comedy
47.	Hattyúdal	2.789	1964	musical comedy
48.	Military Band	2.783	1961	drama
49.	A Husband for Susy	2.671	1960	comedy
50.	Red Ink	2.614	1960	drama
51.	Bogáncs	2.549	1959	youth
52.	At Midnight	2.485	1957	drama
53.	A Tenkes kapitánya I.^{3}	2.470	1965	adventure
54.	A Tenkes kapitánya II.	2.470	1965	adventure
55.	The Naked Diplomat	2.468	1963	comedy
56.	Ward 9	2.464	1955	drama
57.	Alba Regia	2.432	1961	drama
58.	Spiral Staircase	2.424	1957	drama
59.	Erkel	2.420	1952	musical drama
60.	By Order of the Emperor	2.416	1957	historical
61.	Sword and Dice	2.412	1959	drama
62.	Two Confessions	2.363	1957	drama
63.	Just a Joke	2.343	1961	comedy
64.	Treasured Earth	2.342	1948	drama
65.	Singing Makes Life Beautiful	2.340	1950	musical comedy
66.	Sunshine on the Ice	2.332	1961	comedy
67.	Young Hearts	2.305	1953	comedy
68.	Two Kids and the Pyramids	2.287	1963	comedy
69.	Cimborák (with restoration)	2.283	1958	naturefilm for youth
70.	The Csardas Princess	2.279	1971	operetta
71.	Mattie the Goose-boy	2.278	1977	animation
72.	The Brigade No. 39	2.247	1959	drama
73.	A Houseful of Bliss	2.239	1960	comedy
74.	The Little Fox	2.211	1981	youth
75.	The Football Star	2.172	1957	satire
76.	Dani	2.172	1957	drama
77.	Action “Clean Linen”	2.171	1965	comedy
78.	Love on Thursday	2.139	1959	comedy
79.	Házasságból elégséges	2.099	1962	drama
80.	Fekete szem éjszakája	2.082	1958	musical
81.	Nehéz kesztyűk	2.075	1958	drama
82.	A Strange Mask of Identity	2.073	1955	drama
83.	Pár lépés a határ	2.067	1959	drama
84.	Hot Fields	2.059	1949	classical
85.	A Simple Love	2.037	1960	drama
86.	Somewhere in Europe	2.031	1948	drama
87.	Foto Háber	2.011	1963	crime
88.	Georges Dandin	2.001	1955	classic comedy
89.	Gala Suit	1.994	1949	satire
90.	Sweet Anna	1.986	1958	classical
91.	The Golden Head	1.952	1964	youth
92.	The Last Adventure of Don Juan	1.895	1958	comedy
93.	Walking to Heaven	1.898	1959	drama
94.	Abyss	1.887	1956	drama
95.	Palkó Csínom	1.877	1973	musical
96.	The Lion is Ready to Jump	1.844	1969	crime
97.	I'll Appeal to the Minister	1.843	1962	comedy
98.	Prince Bob	1.818	1973	operetta
99.	Relatives	1.816	1954	classical
100.	A Certain Major Benedek	1.771	1960	satire
101.	Professor Hannibal	1.763	1956	drama
102	A Rainy Sunday	1.754	1962	drama
103	Szombattól hétfőig	1.749	1959	drama
104.	The Talking Caftan	1.743	1969	classical
105.	Test Trip	1.74	1961	drama
106.	Miss Windbag	1.739	1963	comedy
107	Catherine' Marriage	1.719	1950	drama
108.	Danse Macabre	1.716	1958	drama
109.	János Háry	1.715	1965	musical
110.	Yesterday	1.692	1959	drama
111.	Sleepless Years	1.688	1959	drama
112.	The Brute	1.681	1961	drama
113.	The Day of Wrath	1.671	1955	drama
114.	Mermaid on the Signet Ring I.^{1}	1.67	1967	crime
115.	Mermaid on the Signet Ring II.	1.67	1967	crime
116.	Guns and Doves	1.648	1961	drama
117.	Hugo the Hippo	1.648	1975	animation
118.	The Right Man	1.605	1960	comedy
119.	A Bird of Heaven	1.599	1958	classical
120.	The Girl Who Liked Purple Flowers	1.593	1973	musical
121	Captive Ráby	1.589	1965	classical
122.	The Siege of Beszterce	1.572	1948	classical
123.	Seven Tons of Dollar	1.569	1974	comedy
124.	Fever	1.558	1957	drama
125.	No Love, Please	1.544	1965	comedy
126.	Díszelőadás	1.536	1955	musical
127.	The Pagan Madonna	1.533	1981	crime
128.	His Majesty's Dates	1.524	1964	comedy
129.	The Kangaroo	1.516	1976	musical
130.	Boys From the Square	1.497	1968	drama
131.	Summer Rain	1.496	1961	drama
132.	A Window on the Sky	1.476	1960	drama
133.	Pillar of Salt	1.474	1958	drama
134.	Virrad	1.474	1960	drama
135.	Johnny Corncob	1.461	1973	animation
136.	Iron Flower	1.451	1958	drama
137.	The Birth of Menyhért Simon	1.449	1954	drama
138.	A Bus Does Not Stop	1.437	1962	comedy
139.	Stephen, the King	1.412	1983	rock-opera
140.	Battle in Peace	1.404	1952	drama
141.	Crime at Dawn	1.40	1960	drama
142.	Well, Young Man?	1.393	1963	drama
143.	Oh, These Young People!	1.376	1967	musical
144.	Professor, Please…	1.371	1956	comedy
145.	Gasoline Damage	1.367	1965	comedy
146.	Fourteen Lives	1.364	1954	drama
147.	Három csillag	1.352	1960	drama
148.	The Turkish Spear	1.344	1974	youth
149.	Májusi fagy	1.333	1962	drama
150.	Drama of the Lark	1.33	1964	classical
151.	On the Roofs of Budapest	1.323	1962	drama
152.	Light behind the Shutter	1.313	1966	crime
153.	The Bells Have Gone to Rome	1.296	1959	drama
154.	Nobody's Daughter	1.289	1976	classical
155.	Lady-Killer in Trouble	1.288	1964	comedy
156.	Cyclists in Love	1.288	1965	drama
157.	Story of My Foolishness	1.272	1966	comedy
158.	Raid	1.271	1958	drama
159	The House Under the Rocks	1.266	1959	drama
160.	Délibáb minden mennyiségben	1.263	1962	satire
161.	The Bridge of Life	1.245	1956	drama
162.	Az arc nélküli város	1.240	1960	drama
163.	Cold Days	1.237	1966	drama
164.	West Zone	1.234	1952	drama
165.	Two Half Times in Hell	1.229	1961	drama
166.	Four Children in the Flood	1.223	1961	drama
167.	Full Steam, Ahead!	1.221	1951	drama
168.	For Whom the Larks Sing	1.209	1959	drama
169.	Forbidden Marriage	1.195	1964	comedy
170.	The Round-Up	1.195	1966	drama
171.	The Storm	1.194	1952	drama
172.	The Golden Kite	1.193	1966	classical
173.	The MoneyMaker	1.187	1964	satire
174.	Tales of a Long Journey	1.182	1962	drama
175.	The Treasure of Swamp Castle	1.179	1985	animation
176.	It's a Long Way Home	1.163	1960	drama
177.	Bon Voyage, Bus!	1.152	1961	comedy
178.	Current	1.123	1964	drama
179.	Black Diamond I.	1.123	1977	classical
180.	Black Diamond II.	1.123	1977	classical
181	The Smugglers	1.122	1958	drama
182	Bunny	1.119	1963	comedy
183.	Love Till First Blood	1.119	1986	drama
184.	Gala Dinner	1.111	1956	drama
185	Egy asszony elindul	1.080	1949	drama
186.	A Girl Was Killed	1.072	1961	drama
187.	Csutak and the Grey Horse	1.067	1961	youth
188.	Calvary	1.064	1960	drama
189.	Twenty Hours	1.052	1965	drama
190.	The Danube Pilot	1.048	1974	adventure
191.	My Way Home	1.040	1965	drama
192.	A Cozy Cottage	1.019	1963	drama
193.	Semmelweis	1.013	1952	drama
194.	Vizipók–Csodapók^{3}	1.006	1983	youth
195.	Vidám verseny	1.004	1954	documentuary
196.	New Gilgames	1	1964	drama

1.Two parter movie was released with an intermission.
2.Two parter movie was released with an intermission (the second part was Zoltán Kárpáthy).
3. The tv series was re-edited into a feature film.
