= György Bárdy =

Hungarian actor

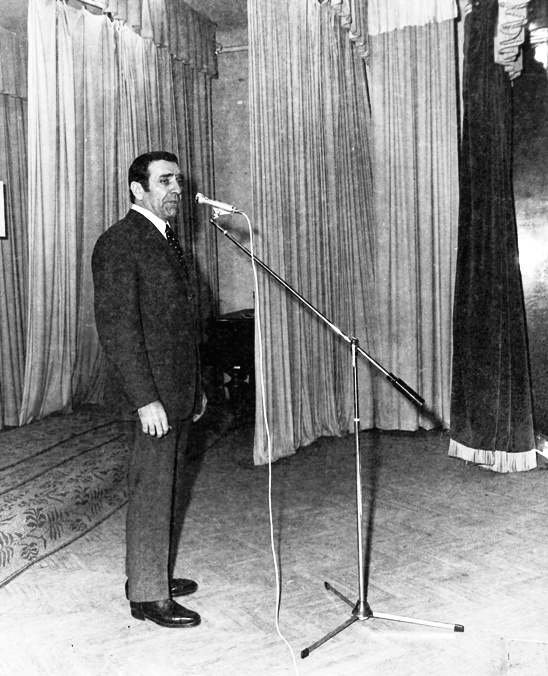
- György Bárdy
- Born: 26 May 1921; Kispest, Kingdom of Hungary
- Died: 27 May 2013 (aged 92); Budapest, Hungary

György Bárdy (26 May 1921 – 27 May 2013) was a Hungarian film and television actor.

== Selected filmography ==
- Somewhere in Europe (1948)
- The Land Is Ours (1951)
- West Zone (1952)
- Leila and Gábor (1956)
- Adventure in Gerolstein (1957)
- Two Confessions (1957)
- Fever (1957)
- Pillar of Salt (1958)
- What a Night! (1958)
- Danse Macabre (1958)
- Pillar of Salt (1958)
- The House Under the Rocks (1958)
- A Few Steps to the Frontier (1959)
- A Girl Danced Into His Life (1964)
- And Then The Guy... (1966)
- Zoltán Kárpáthy (1966)
- Jaguár (1967)
- Stars of Eger (1968)
- Hahó, Öcsi! (1971)
