= Hot Fields =

1949 film

- Directed by: Imre Apáthi
- Written by: Zsigmond Móricz (novel); Zoltán Várkonyi
- Produced by: Mrs. Miklós Vitéz
- Starring: Katalin Karády; Vera Szemere; Sándor Szabó
- Cinematography: Barnabás Hegyi
- Edited by: Mihály Morell
- Music by: Ferenc Farkas
- Production company: Magyar Filmgyártó Nemzeti Vállalat
- Release date: 26 March 1949
- Running time: 94 minutes
- Country: Hungary
- Language: Hungarian

Hot Fields (Hungarian: Forró mezők) is a 1949 Hungarian drama film directed by Imre Apáthi and starring Katalin Karády, Vera Szemere and Sándor Szabó. It was shot at the Hunnia Studios in Budapest. The film's sets were designed by the art director József Pán. It was Karády's final film, and she emigrated to Brazil soon afterwards.

== Cast ==
- Katalin Karády as Vilma, Avary felesége
- Vera Szemere as A jegyzõné
- Sándor Szabó as Rendõrkapitány
- Miklós Szakáts as Avary László
- Gábor Rajnay as Bátki
- László Földényi as Fábián
- Gyula Benkö as Boldizsár Pista
- Sándor Pethes as Alispán
- János Zách as A jegyzõ
- Iván Darvas as Lengyel Laci

== Bibliography ==
- Cunningham, John. Hungarian Cinema: From Coffee House to Multiplex. Wallflower Press, 2004.
