= Ádám Szirtes =

Hungarian actor

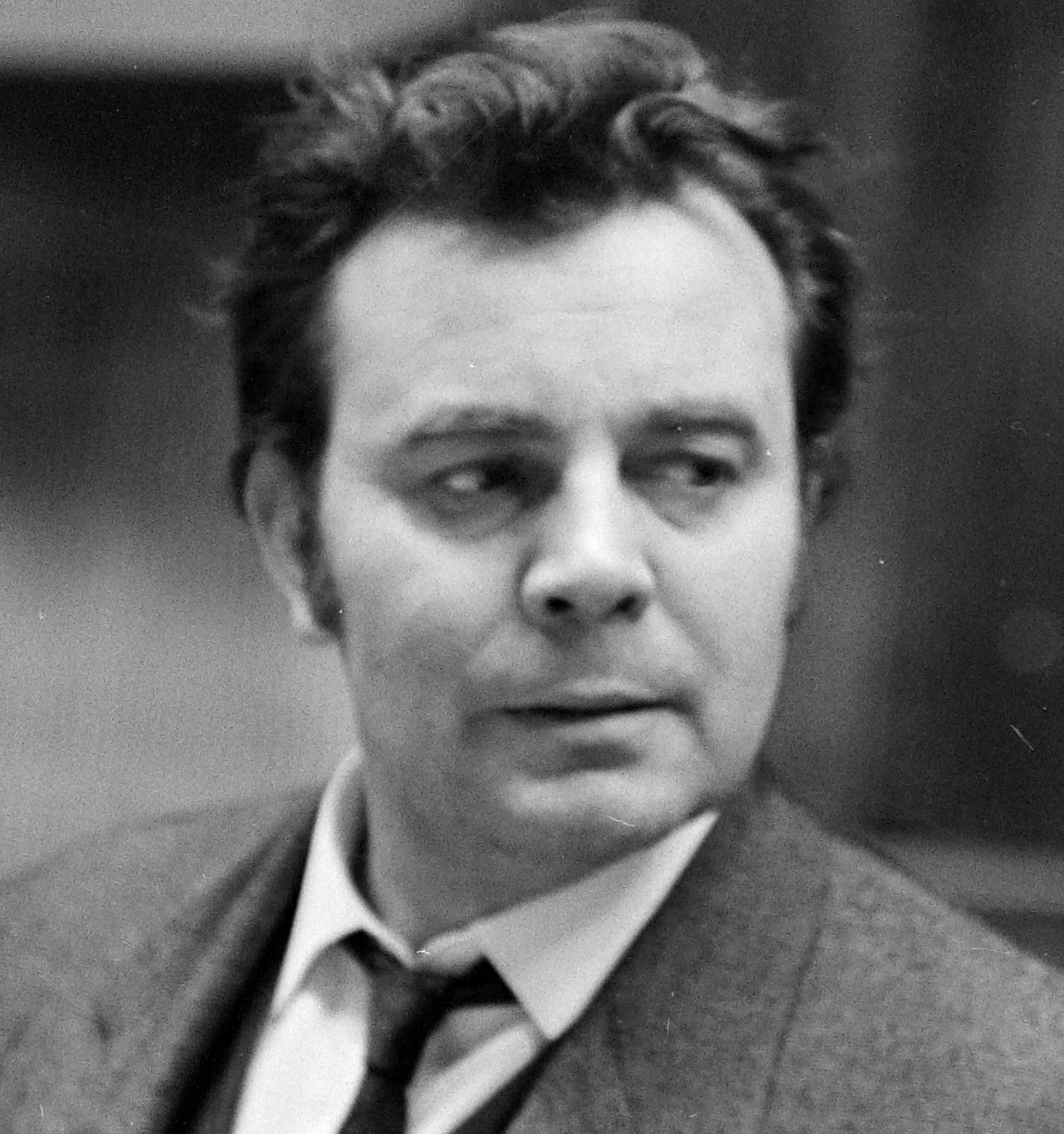
- Ádám Szirtes c. 1969
- Born: February 10, 1925; Sülysáp, Kingdom of Hungary
- Died: July 27, 1989 (aged 64); Budapest, Hungarian People's Republic
- Burial place: Farkasréti Cemetery
- Education: Árpád Horváth College of Actors (1947–); College of Theater and Film Arts (–1950)
- Occupations: Actor; voice actor
- Years active: 1948–1989
- Children: Ági Szirtes
- Awards: Jászai Mari Award (1955); Béla Balázs Award (1960); SZOT Award (1969); Hungarian Merited Artist Award (1970); Outstanding Artist of Hungary Award (1983); Kossuth Prize (1988)

Ádám Szirtes (born Ádám Szvitek February 10, 1925 – July 27, 1989) was a Hungarian actor.

== Selected filmography ==
- Treasured Earth (1948)
- The Marriage of Katalin Kis (1950)
- The Land Is Ours (1951)
- Battle in Peace (1952)
- West Zone (1952)
- Kiskrajcár (1953)
- The Sea Has Risen (1953)
- Accident (1955)
- Love Travels by Coach (1955)
- Merry-Go-Round (1956)
- Sunday Romance (1957)
- The House Under the Rocks (1958)
- A Bird of Heaven (1958)
- I'll Go to the Minister (1962)
- Tales of a Long Journey (1963)
- Háry János (1965)
- Twenty Hours (1965)
- Hideg Napok (1966)
- The Testament of Aga Koppanyi (1967)
- Stars of Eger (1968)
- Irány Mexikó! (1968)
- Nobody's Daughter (1976)
