= Zsuzsa Csala =

Hungarian actress (1933–2014)

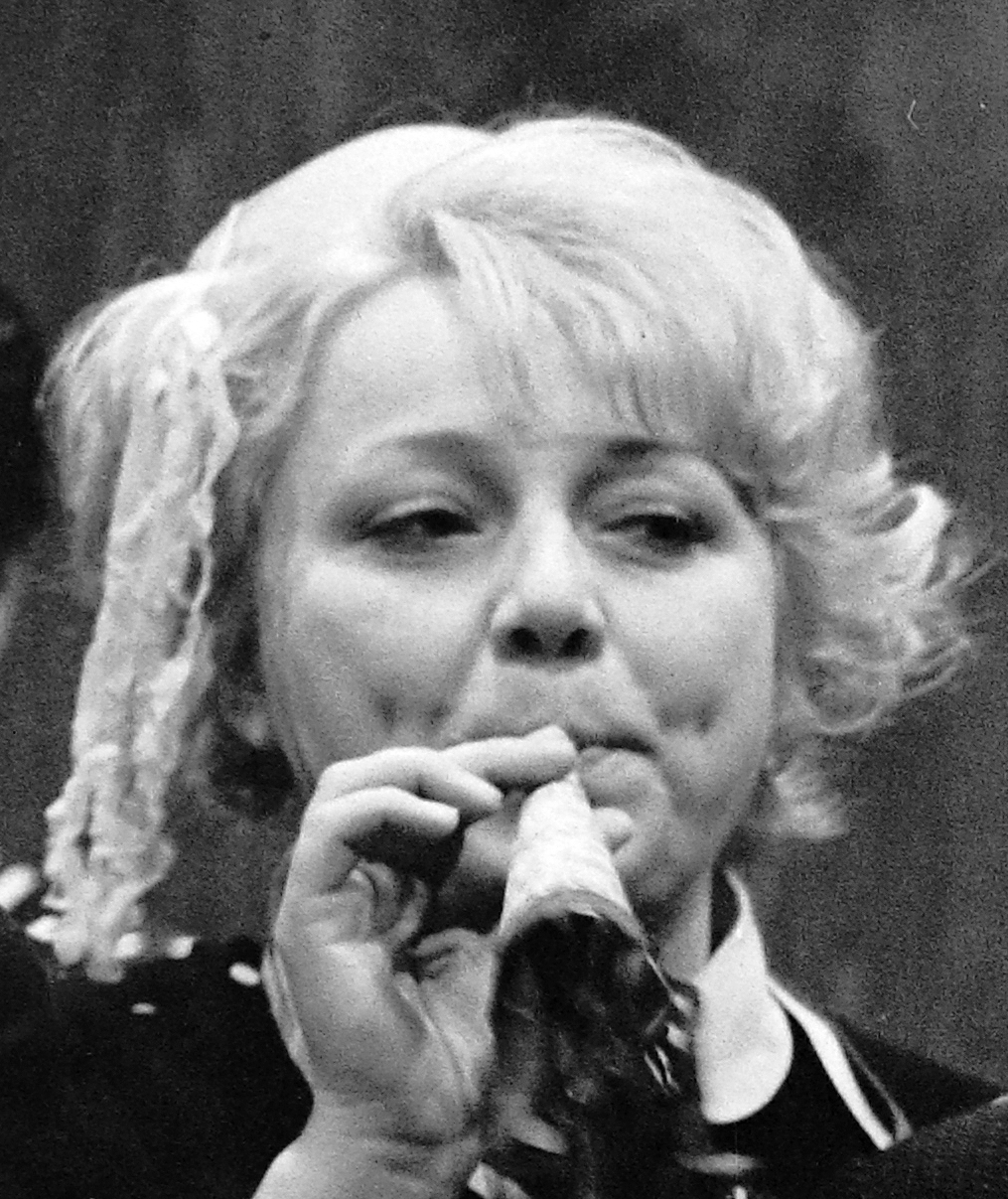
- Csala in 1960
- Born: Ilona Zsuzsanna Csala; 9 July 1933; Budapest, Hungary
- Died: 22 February 2014 (aged 80); Budapest, Hungary
- Occupation: Actress

Zsuzsa Csala (born Ilona Zsuzsanna Csala; 9 July 1933 – 22 February 2014) was a Hungarian actress from Budapest.

== Filmography ==
Films and television
Year	Title	Role	Notes
1958	Csendes otthon		
1958	St. Peter's Umbrella	Srankóné	
1959	A mi földünk		
1960	Young Noszty and Mary Toth		
1961	Egy régi villamos		
1961	Katonazene		
1961	Jó utat, autóbusz	Pergelné	
1962	Májusi fagy		
1962	Házasságból elégséges		
1962	Hagymácska	Szélzacskó hercegnõ	TV movie
1962	Csudapest		TV movie
1963	Mici néni két élete		
1963	Tücsök	Virágné	
1964	Pacsirta		
1965	Car Crazy	Szomszéd	
1965	Tilos a szerelem	Szakácsnõ	
1966	Minden kezdet nehéz		
1966	And Then The Guy...	Hintaló vásárló	
1966	Nem szoktam hazudni	Taxisofõr	
1967	Segítség, lógok	Pirike, titkárnõ	
1969	Hazai pálya		
1969	Alfa Romeó és Júlia	Zsuzsa	
1970	A nagy kék jelzés	Teréz	
1970	Csak egy telefon	A tanácselnök felesége	
1970	Hatholdas rózsakert	Postáskisasszony	
1973	Lila ákác	Kövér jelentkezõ	
1979	Égigérö fü	Market Woman	
1984	Hófehér	III. királynö	Voice
1988	Nyitott ablak	Vendéglõsné	
2002	Nyúlék	Frida Nyúl	TV series
2009	Holnap történt - A nagy bulvárfilm	Aunt	(final film role)
