= Zoltán Várkonyi =

Hungarian actor and film director

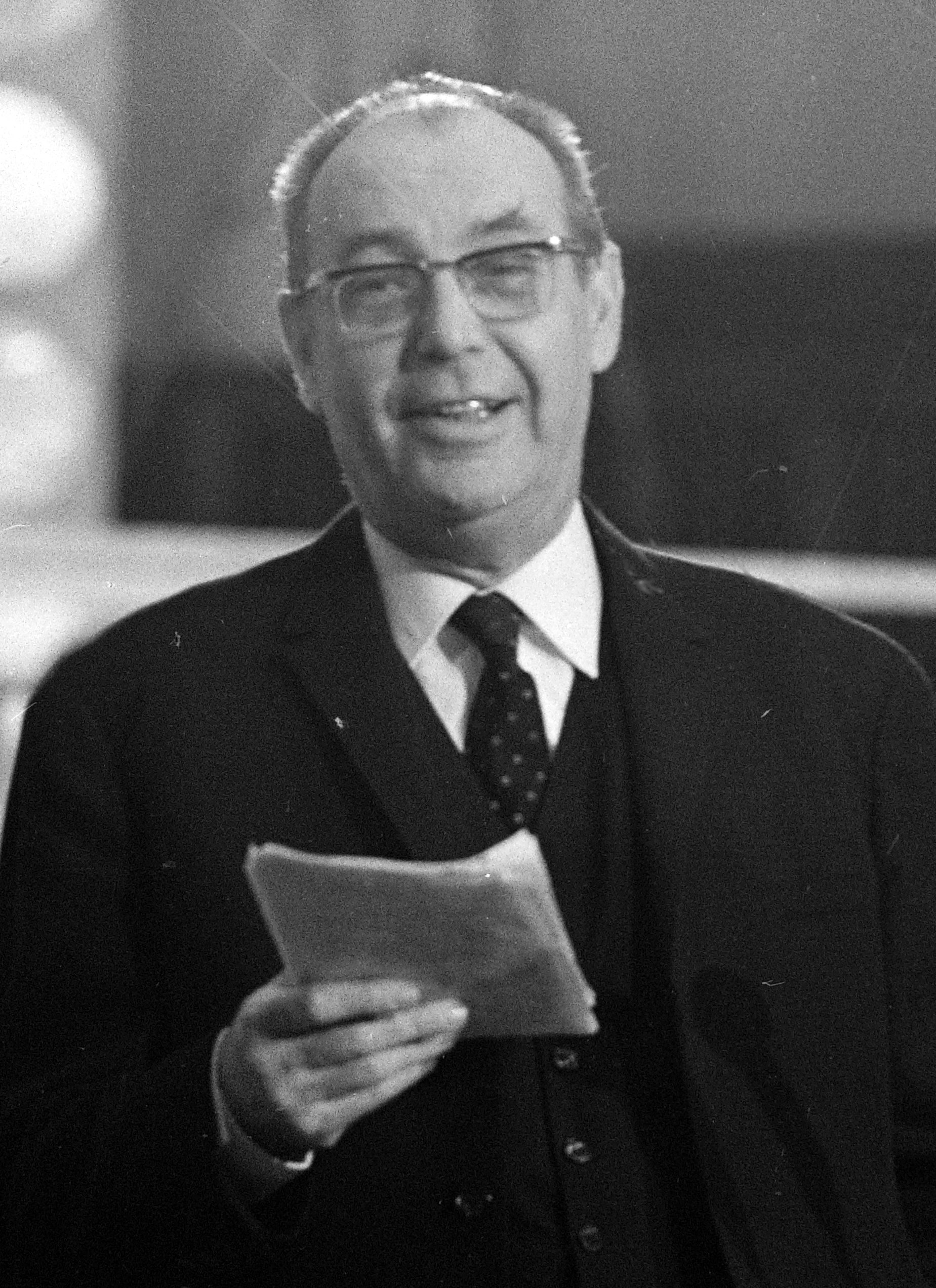
- Zoltán Várkonyi in 1966.
- Born: 13 May 1912; Budapest; Austria-Hungary
- Died: 10 April 1979 (aged 66); Budapest; Hungary
- Occupations: Film actor Film director
- Years active: 1934–1976

Zoltán Várkonyi (13 May 1912 – 10 April 1979) was a Hungarian actor and film director. In 1961, he was a member of the jury at the 2nd Moscow International Film Festival. Four years later, he was a member of the jury at the 4th Moscow International Film Festival.

== Selected filmography ==
=== Director ===
- West Zone (1952)
- A Strange Mask of Identity (1955)
- Pillar of Salt (1958)
- Crime at Dawn (1960)
- Foto Háber (1963)
- Kárpáthy Zoltán (1966)
- Stars of Eger (1968)
- Szemtől szembe (1970)

=== Actor ===
- The Dream Car (1934)
- My Daughter Is Different (1937)
- The Mysterious Stranger (1937)
- Black Diamonds (1938)
- Rosemary (1938)
- Stars of Variety (1939)
- The Perfect Man (1939)
- Princess of the Puszta (1939)
- The Unquiet Night (1940)
- Gül Baba (1940)
- The Schoolmistress (1945)
- West Zone (1952)
- Erkel (1952)
- Don Juan's Last Adventure (1958)
- Iron Flower (1958)
- Story of My Foolishness (1966)
- Kárpáthy Zoltán (1966)

=== Screenwriter ===
- Hot Fields (1949)

== Bibliography ==
- Cunningham, John. Hungarian Cinema: From Coffee House to Multiplex. Wallflower Press, 2004.
