= Háry János (1965 film) =

- Directed by: Miklós Szinetár
- Written by: Béla Paulini; Zsolt Harsányi
- Starring: Ádám Szirtes; Mária Medgyesi; Teri Tordai; Manyi Kiss
- Cinematography: János Tóth
- Edited by: Zoltán Farkas
- Music by: Zoltán Kodály
- Production company: MAFILM
- Release date: 19 August 1965
- Running time: 115 minutes
- Country: Hungary
- Language: Hungarian

Háry János is a 1965 Hungarian musical film directed by Miklós Szinetár and starring Ádám Szirtes, Mária Medgyesi and Teri Tordai. It is an adaptation of the folk opera Háry János which had previously been made into a film in 1941.

== Cast ==
- Ádám Szirtes - Háry János
- Mária Medgyesi - Örzse
- Teri Tordai - Mária Lujza
- Manyi Kiss - Császárné
- László Bánhidi - Marci
- László Márkus - Ebelasztin
- Samu Balázs - Császár
- Gyula Bodrogi - Napoleon
- Sándor Tompa - Ivócimbora
- Sándor Peti - Ivócimbora
- László Misoga - Kocsmáros
- László Keleti - Krucifix generális
- Lajos Cs. Németh - Jóska
- Gábor Koncz - Diák
- Endre Harkányi - Osztrák tábornok
