= Honesty and Glory =

1951 film

- Directed by: Viktor Gertler
- Written by: István Örkény
- Based on: novel by István Örkény
- Produced by: Ferenc Pless
- Starring: János Görbe; Mária Sulyok; Hilda Gobbi
- Cinematography: István Eiben; István Pásztor
- Edited by: Mária Szécsényi
- Music by: Pál Kadosa
- Production company: Magyar Filmgyártó Állami Vállalat
- Release date: 13 April 1951
- Running time: 110 minutes
- Country: Hungary
- Language: Hungarian

Honesty and Glory (Hungarian: Becsület és dicsöség) is a 1951 Hungarian musical comedy drama film directed by Viktor Gertler and starring János Görbe, Mária Sulyok and Hilda Gobbi. It was shot at the Hunnia Studios in Budapest. The film's sets were designed by the art director József Pán.

== Cast ==
- János Görbe as Lugosi
- Mária Sulyok as Lugosiné, Eszter
- István Szatmári as Luckó, Lugusiék fia
- Hilda Gobbi as Mami
- Mari Szemes as Rózsi, Luckó menyasszonya
- Tibor Molnár as Bikov, szovjet sztahanovista
- Sándor Deák as Dallos
- Sándor Kömíves as Jóna
- József Képessy as Sántha
- István Egri as Kórodi, fõmérnök
- Gyula Gózon as Birman
- Imre Apáthi as Hartlauer
- József Juhász as Gosztola
- János Pásztor as Bárány
- István Somló as Bittera

== Bibliography ==
- Liehm, Mira & Liehm, Antonín J. The Most Important Art: Soviet and Eastern European Film After 1945. University of California Press, 1980.
