= Péter Benkő =

Hungarian film and television actor

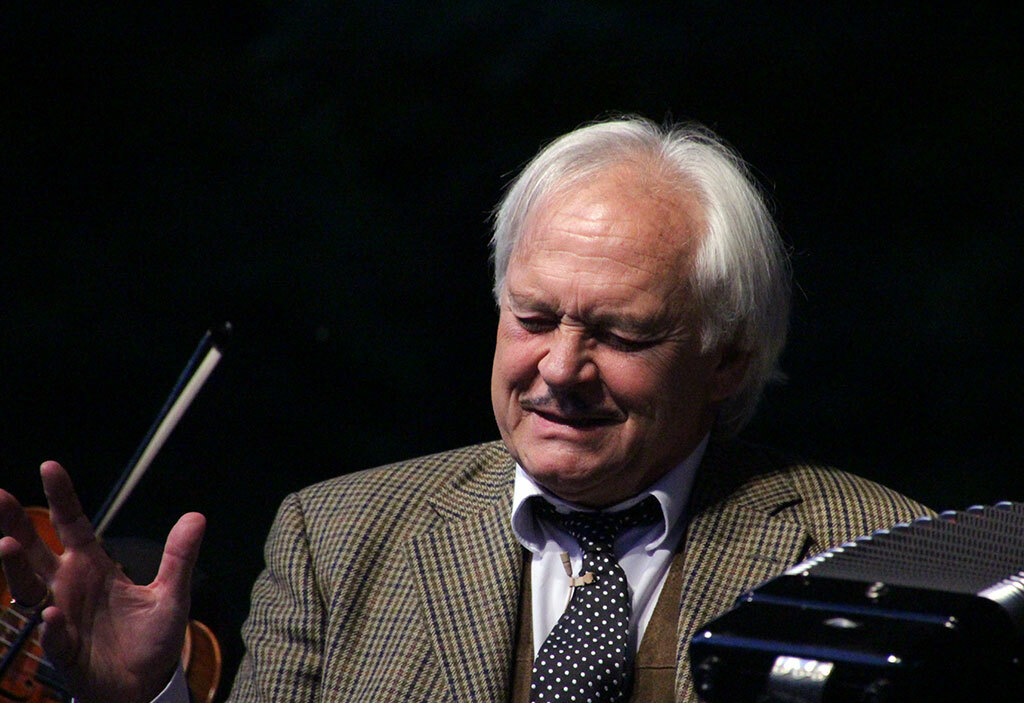
- Born: 1 June 1947 (age 78); Budapest, Hungary
- Occupations: Film actor Television actor
- Years active: 1954 -

Péter Benkő (born 1947) is a Hungarian actor, son of actor Gyula Benkő.

== Selected filmography ==
- Keep Your Chin Up (1954)
- The Testament of Aga Koppanyi (1967)
- Stars of Eger (1968)
- Temperate Zone (1970)
- Csínom Palkó (1973)
- Tüzgömbök (1975)
- The Fortress (1979)
- The Pagan Madonna (1980)
- Lutra (1986)

== Bibliography ==
- Burns, Bryan. World Cinema: Hungary. Fairleigh Dickinson University Press, 1996.
