= János Görbe =

Hungarian Actor

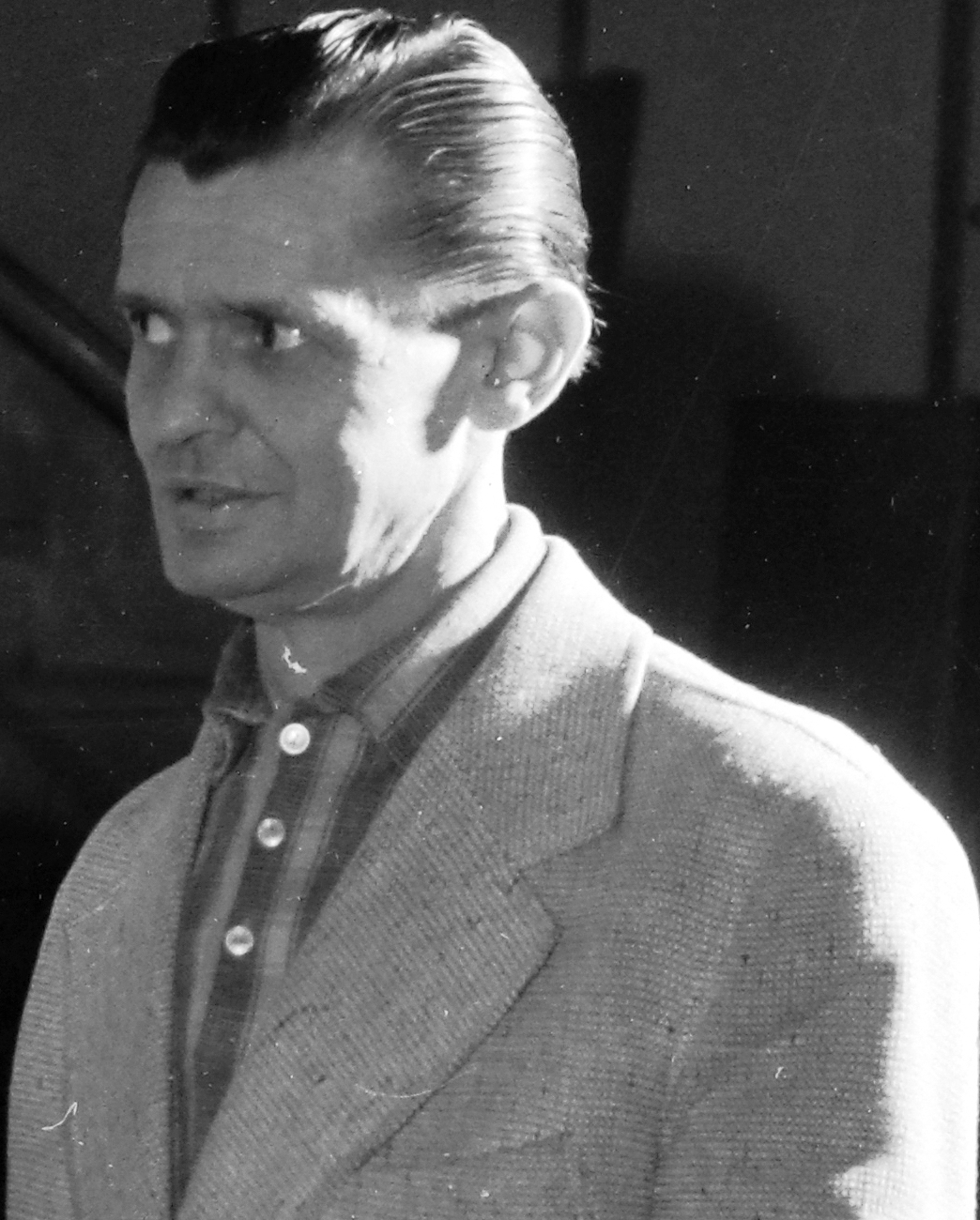
- Görbe in 1961
- Born: 12 November 1912; Jászárokszállás, Austria-Hungary
- Died: 5 September 1968 (aged 55); Budapest, Hungary
- Occupation: Actor
- Family: Nóra Görbe (daughter)

János Görbe born as Görbe János (12 November 1912 – 5 September 1968) was a prominent Hungarian actor of film and theater. He was the father of actress Nóra Görbe, star of the popular 80's TV series, "Linda".

In the course of his career, he worked with the most prominent contemporary directors in Hungary, Károly Makk, Miklós Jancsó and Zoltán Fábri. His most famous films include the Cannes favorite The Round-Up (1965 film) by Jancsó or hu:Föltámadott a tenger in which he played Hungary's national hero, poet Sándor Petőfi who perished in the Hungarian Revolution of 1848 against the Habsburgs.

His movies Ház a sziklák alatt (The House Under the Rocks by Makk, 1959), Húsz óra by Fábri (Twenty Hours, 1965), Ének a búzamezőkről (1947), and Emberek a Havason (People on the Alps/Men on the Mountain, 1942) are also considered landmarks of Hungarian and international cinematic history.

Although apolitical all his life, Görbe recited Petőfi poems to the cheering crowd during the Hungarian Revolution of 1956 against the USSR, standing on the balcony of Debrecen Theater.

János Görbe was also an acclaimed "Tiborc" in János Katona's Bánk bán. The role of Bánk was played by his The Round-Up (1965 film) co-star Zoltán Latinovits.

Görbe won a Kossuth Prize in 1951 – Hungary's most important prize for an artist.

== Selected filmography ==
- Landslide (1940)
- Yellow Rose (1941)
- Silenced Bells (1941)
- Today, Yesterday and Tomorrow (1941)
- People of the Mountains (1942)
- Song of the Cornfields (1947)
- Mattie the Goose-boy (1950)
- Honesty and Glory (1951)
- The Land Is Ours (1951)
- Full Steam Ahead (1951)
- Try and Win (1952)
- The Sea Has Risen (1953)
- Fourteen Lives (1954)
- A Glass of Beer (1955)
- The Bridge of Life (1956)
- Dani (1957)
- The House Under the Rocks (1958)
- The Round-Up (1965 film) (1965)
- Twenty Hours (1965)
- A Holiday with Piroschka (1965)
- And Then The Guy... (1966)
