= Fever (1957 film) =

1957 film

- Directed by: Viktor Gertler
- Written by: Péter Szász
- Produced by: László Szirtes
- Starring: Ferenc Bessenyei; Tivadar Uray; Margit Bara
- Cinematography: Barnabás Hegyi
- Edited by: Sándor Boronkay
- Music by: György Ránki
- Production company: Mafilm
- Release date: 3 October 1957
- Running time: 113 minutes
- Country: Hungary
- Language: Hungarian

Fever (Hungarian: Láz) is a 1957 Hungarian drama film directed by Viktor Gertler and starring Ferenc Bessenyei, Tivadar Uray and Margit Bara. It was shot at the Hunnia Studios in Budapest. The film was written by Peter Szász. The film's sets were designed by the art director István Kovács.

== Synopsis ==
After the First World War an aspiring engineer returns from captivity to try and establish aluminium production. He attracts the attention of both Zsuzsa, the daughter of a prominent man, and Flóra a teacher.

== Cast ==
- Ferenc Bessenyei as Szabó Barna
- Tivadar Uray as Ezredes (Colonel)
- Margit Bara as Takács Flóra
- László Csákányi as Glatz Ervin
- Zsuzsa Gordon as Szegáll Zsuzsa
- Hans W. Hamacher as Neumann
- Manyi Kiss as Szimolisz Gizi
- István Somló as Szegáll
- Ernö Szabó as Alexárd
- Ferenc Baracsi
- Géza Berczy
- György Bárdy
- Kálmán Erdödy
- Emil Fenyö
- Zoltán Gera
- Árpád Gyenge
- János Horkay
- Magda Kardos
- László Kemény
- György Kálmán
- Miklós Szakáts

== Production ==
" It took a year and a half to make the film, shooting having taking place until just before the events of 1956."

== Reception ==
Although belonging historically to a "transitional period (between 1954 and 1962)" in Hungarian cinema, the film is said to "still have the classic features of melodrama".

== Bibliography ==
- Balski, Grzegorz. Directory of Eastern European Film-makers and Films 1945-1991. Flicks Books, 1992.
- Homoródy, József. Magyar film, 1948-1963. Filmtudományi Intézet, 1964.
