= And Then The Guy... =

1966 film

- Directed by: Viktor Gertler
- Written by: Viktor Gertler; János Herskó; Péter Szász
- Produced by: Lajos Óvári
- Starring: Imre Sinkovits; Irén Psota; Mari Törőcsik
- Cinematography: István Hildebrand
- Edited by: Mihály Morell
- Music by: György Ránki
- Production company: Hunnia Filmgyár
- Release date: 8 September 1966
- Running time: 92 minutes
- Country: Hungary
- Language: Hungarian

And Then The Guy... (Hungarian: És akkor a pasas...) is a 1966 Hungarian comedy drama film directed by Viktor Gertler and starring Imre Sinkovits, Irén Psota and Mari Törőcsik. It was shot at the Hunnia Studios in Budapest. The film's sets were designed by the art director László Duba.

== Cast ==
- Imre Sinkovits as Mr. Pennypepper rendezõ
- Irén Psota as Marika / Maud / nõ / Tekla
- Mari Törőcsik as Mara
- Tamás Major as Xandor
- György Kálmán as Idegorvos
- Erzsébet Házy as Széphalminé
- János Görbe as õrmester
- Zoltán Latinovits as A fõnök
- László Márkus as Charlie
- Alfonzó as Józsi bácsi
- Imre Pongrácz as Popper könyvelõje
- József Réti as énekes
- György Bárdy as Billy
- Tivadar Horváth as Német filmrendezõ
- János Zách as Igazgató
- Gábor Koncz as Dick
- Blanka Péchy as A mama
- Sándor Pethes as Rendezõ
- Zsuzsa Csala as Hintaló vásárló
- Sándor Peti as Jelvényárus
- László Kozák as Széphalmi

== Bibliography ==
- Balski, Grzegorz. Directory of Eastern European Film-makers and Films 1945-1991. Flicks Books, 1992.
- Nemeskürty, István & Szántó, Tibor. A Pictorial Guide to the Hungarian Cinema, 1901-1984. Helikon, 1985.
