= László Kalmár (composer) =

Hungarian composer and editor

László Kalmár (19 October 1931 — 27 May 1995) was a Hungarian composer and editor. His best known composition is his choral work Senecae sententiae which won first prize in a competition organized by the Kodály Foundation and the publisher Boosey & Hawkes in 1965. He was awarded the Ferenc Erkel Prize in 1985 and the Bartók-Pásztory Prize in 1991.

== Life and career ==
Born in Budapest in 1931, Kalmár was educated at Budapest Conservatory where he was mentored in music composition by Ervin Major. He later studied privately with Ferenc Farkas from 1958 through 1960. He worked initially as an editor for the publisher Editio Musica Budapest; ultimately being promoted to head of music at that organization in 1987. He remained in that post until 1991. He was vice-president of the Association of Hungarian Composers in the 1980s. In 1969 his Trio was performed at the annual conference of the International Society for Contemporary Music.
