= Kiskrajcár =

1953 film

- Directed by: Márton Keleti
- Written by: Boris Palotai; András Sándor; Gábor Thurzó
- Starring: Ági Mészáros
- Cinematography: György Illés
- Edited by: Mihály Morell
- Distributed by: Columbia Pictures Hungary (Original); DreamWorks Hungary (Current)
- Release date: November 1953
- Running time: 107 minutes
- Country: Hungary
- Language: Hungarian

Kiskrajcár is a 1953 Hungarian comedy film directed by Márton Keleti. It was entered into the 1954 Cannes Film Festival.

== Cast ==
- Ági Mészáros as Garas Juli
- Ádám Szirtes as Orbán
- Erzsi Pápai as Anna (as Pápay Erzsi)
- Imre Soós as Madaras Jóska
- Ferenc Bessenyei as Turi
- Sándor Tompa as Szöllõsi
- Zsuzsa Simon as Tiszai Edit
- Manyi Kiss as Zámbóné
- Márta Fónay as Gulyásné
- Imre Pongrácz as Balogh
- Ferenc Kállai as Miskei (as Kállay Ferenc)
- Andor Ajtay as Mikola
- Vera Sennyei as Rauf Kornélia
- John Bartha as Simics, member of the Madaras brigade
