= The Smugglers (1958 film) =

1958 film

- Directed by: Félix Máriássy
- Written by: Félix Máriássy; Pál Szabó; Gábor Thurzó
- Produced by: György Zombory
- Starring: Margit Bara; Gábor Agárdi; Teri Horváth
- Cinematography: Barnabás Hegyi
- Edited by: Mária Szécsényi
- Music by: Imre Vincze
- Production company: Hunnia Filmgyár
- Release date: 23 October 1958
- Running time: 90 minutes
- Country: Hungary
- Language: Hungarian

The Smugglers (Hungarian: Csempészek) is a 1958 Hungarian drama film directed by Félix Máriássy and starring Margit Bara, Gábor Agárdi and Teri Horváth. It was shot at the Hunnia Studios in Budapest. The film's sets were designed by the art director Béla Zeichan.

== Cast ==
- Margit Bara as Anyica
- Gábor Agárdi as Mihály
- Teri Horváth as Rozi
- Béla Barsi as Román gazda
- László Bánhidi as Mikó Sándor
- István Egri as Kulcsár
- Antal Farkas as Borjúvásárló
- József Fonyó as Nyalókaárus
- Dezsö Garas as Kocsmáros
- Zoltán Gera as Tekejátékos
- László Kozák as Teke tulajdonos
- Béla Károlyi as A gazdag utazó sofőrje
- József Kautzky as Határőr
- László Misoga as Jövendőmondó
- Gábor Mádi Szabó as Határőr főhadnagy
- Sándor Siménfalvy as Napszámos
- Bertalan Solti as Árgyelán Tógyer
- Sándor Suka as Román határőr
- Erzsi Máthé as Csizmaárus
- Károly Verebes as Román határőrparancsnok
- János Zách as Főorvos

== Bibliography ==
- Liehm, Mira & Liehm, Antonín J. The Most Important Art: Soviet and Eastern European Film After 1945. University of California Press, 1980.
- Virginás, Andrea. Film Genres in Hungarian and Romanian Cinema: History, Theory, and Reception. Rowman & Littlefield, 2021.
