= The House Under the Rocks =

1958 film

- Directed by: Károly Makk; György Hintsch
- Written by: Sándor Tatay
- Produced by: Ottó Föld
- Starring: János Görbe; Irén Psota; Margit Bara
- Cinematography: György Illés
- Edited by: Sándor Boronkay
- Music by: István Sárközy
- Production company: Hunnia Filmstúdió
- Release dates: August 1958 (Venice); 15 January 1959 (Hungary)
- Running time: 101 minutes
- Country: Hungary
- Language: Hungarian

The House Under the Rocks (Hungarian: Ház a sziklák alatt) is a 1958 Hungarian drama film directed by Károly Makk and György Hintsch and starring János Görbe, Irén Psota and Margit Bara. It was shot at the Hunnia Studios in Budapest. The film's sets were designed by the art director László Duba. It premiered at the 1958 Venice Film Festival before being released in Hungary the following year.

== Cast ==
- János Görbe as Kós Ferenc
- Irén Psota as Tera
- Margit Bara as Zsuzsa
- József Bihari as öreg Kós
- Béla Barsi as Sógor
- Ádám Szirtes as Sándor
- Sándor Deák as Füredi
- Viola Orbán as az öreg Kós felesége
- György Bárdy as Erdész
- Erzsi Máthé as árus a kompon
- Mária Rákosi as Részeg nõ
- Sándor Siménfalvy as Paraszt
- Mária Sívó as Sógorné
- Irma Vass as Bori néni

== Bibliography ==
- Burns, Bryan. World Cinema: Hungary. Fairleigh Dickinson Univ Press, 1996.
- Liehm, Mira & Liehm, Antonín J. The Most Important Art: Soviet and Eastern European Film After 1945. University of California Press, 1980.
- Rîpeanu, Bujor. (ed.) International Directory of Cinematographers, Set- and Costume Designers in Film: Hungary (from the beginnings to 1988). Saur, 1981.
