= The Land Is Ours (film) =

1951 film

- Directed by: Frigyes Bán
- Written by: Pál Szabó (novel); Frigyes Bán
- Produced by: Jenõ Katona
- Starring: Ádám Szirtes; Ági Mészáros; Ilona Egri
- Cinematography: György Illés
- Edited by: Zoltán Kerényi
- Music by: Ferenc Farkas
- Production company: Mafilm
- Distributed by: Mokép
- Release date: 30 March 1951
- Running time: 110 minutes
- Country: Hungary
- Language: Hungarian

The Land Is Ours (Hungarian: Felszabadult föld) is a 1951 Hungarian drama film directed by Frigyes Bán and starring Ádám Szirtes, Ági Mészáros and Ilona Egri. It was shot at the Hunnia Studios in Budapest. The film's sets were designed by the art director József Pán. It was a sequel to the 1948 film Treasured Earth.

== Synopsis ==
In 1944 following the German Occupation Jóska is imprisoned in Szeged where he becomes a communist. Following the arrival of the Soviets he is freed he returns to his village and with his wife Marika plans to improve life for the farmers in defiance of the old ruling class of the area.

== Cast ==
- Ádám Szirtes as Góz Jóska
- Ági Mészáros as Marika
- Ilona Egri as Mária, Gózék kislánya
- Benö Tamás as Juhos bácsi
- Viola Orbán as Öreg Gózné
- László Bánhidi as Szilassy
- Zoltán Makláry as Hegyi
- János Görbe as Kovács Gábor
- István Egri as Zsíros-Tóth
- Sándor Pécsi as Jámbor Lajos
- Sándor Tompa as Eszenyi
- Gyula Tapolczay as Dr.Kabay
- Sándor Deák as Számtartó
- Zoltán Greguss as Kretz, földbirtokos
- József Juhász as Plébános
- László Ujlaky as Szovjet kapitány
- József Vándor as Szovjet õrmester
- György Bárdy as SS fõhadnagy
- Ferenc Szabó as SS õrmester

== Bibliography ==
- Balski, Grzegorz . Directory of Eastern European Film-makers and Films 1945-1991. Flicks Books, 1992.
- Cunningham, John. Hungarian Cinema: From Coffee House to Multiplex. Wallflower Press, 2004.
- Homoródy, József. Magyar film, 1948-1963. Filmtudományi Intézet, 1964.
