= Tamás Fejér =

Hungarian film director

- Born: 29 December 1920; Pécs, Hungary
- Died: 27 June 2006 (aged 85); Budapest, Hungary
- Occupation: Film director
- Years active: 1937-1988

Tamás Fejér (29 December 1920 – 27 June 2006) was a Hungarian film director. He directed 28 films between 1937 and 1988.

== Selected filmography ==
- A Cozy Cottage (1963)
