= The Sea Has Risen =

1953 film

- Theatrical release poster
- Directed by: László Ranódy; Mihály Szemes; Kálmán Nádasdy
- Written by: Gyula Illyés (story by); Kálmán Nádasdy
- Starring: János Görbe; Zoltán Makláry
- Cinematography: Barnabás Hegyi
- Edited by: Mihály Morell
- Music by: Ferenc Szabó
- Production company: Magyar Filmgyártó Nemzeti Vállalat
- Release date: 30 April 1953
- Running time: 145 minutes
- Country: Hungary
- Language: Hungarian

The Sea Has Risen (Hungarian: Föltámadott a tenger) is a 1953 Hungarian historical drama film directed by László Ranódy, Mihály Szemes and Kálmán Nádasdy. It stars János Görbe, Zoltán Makláry and Lajos Básti. The film portrays Sándor Petőfi and the events of the Hungarian Revolution of 1848.

== Partial cast ==
- János Görbe as Sándor Petõfi
- Zoltán Makláry as József Bem
- Lajos Básti as Lajos Kossuth
- Miklós Szakáts as Artúr Görgey
- Violetta Ferrari as Júlia Szendrey
- Ádám Szirtes as Gyurka Hajdu, peasant boy
- Gábor Mádi Szabó as Gergely Kicsi, székely hussar
- János Dömsödi as Szárazberky junior, gentry
- Imre Apáthi as Count Zichy
- John Bartha as Austrian soldier who says "The emperor has escaped"
- Éva Kelemen as Mrs. Vahot
- Gyula Justh as Pope
- Jenö Danis as Székely man

== Bibliography ==
- Liehm, Mira & Liehm, Antonín J. The Most Important Art: Eastern European Film After 1945. University of California Press, 1977.
