= Don Juan's Last Adventure =

1958 film

- Directed by: Márton Keleti
- Written by: Péter Szász
- Produced by: József Golda
- Starring: Zoltán Várkonyi; Margit Bara; Antal Páger
- Cinematography: Barnabás Hegyi
- Edited by: Sándor Boronkay
- Music by: Tibor Polgár
- Production company: Hunnia Filmstúdió
- Release date: 11 December 1958
- Running time: 92 minutes
- Country: Hungary
- Language: Hungarian

Don Juan's Last Adventure (Hungarian: Don Juan legutolsó kalandja) is a 1958 Hungarian drama film directed by Márton Keleti and starring Zoltán Várkonyi, Margit Bara and Antal Páger. It was shot at the Hunnia Studios in Budapest. The film's sets were designed by the art director László Duba.

== Synopsis ==
Suffering under a curse of several hundred years, Don Juan arrives in Budapest in the guise of a South American businessman. He has to charm a new woman to avoid the curse, but Kata refuses to be swayed by any of his practiced tricks at seduction.

== Cast ==
- Zoltán Várkonyi as Don Juan
- Margit Bara as Lukács Kata
- Antal Páger as Leporello
- György Pálos
- Imre Apáthi
- Tibor Benedek
- Ervin Kibédi
- István Rozsos
- János Rajz
- Ernő Szabó
- Oszkár Ascher
- Józsa Hacser
- Manyi Kiss
- János Makláry
- Éva Schubert
- Mari Szemes
- György Melis
- Júlia Osváth
- Lajos Tóth

== Bibliography ==
- Cunningham, John. Hungarian Cinema: From Coffee House to Multiplex. Wallflower Press, 2004.
- Rîpeanu, Bujor. (ed.) International Directory of Cinematographers, Set- and Costume Designers in Film: Hungary (from the beginnings to 1988). Saur, 1981.
