= Accident (1955 film) =

1955 film

- Directed by: Viktor Gertler
- Written by: Péter Szász; István Vajda
- Produced by: István Lénárt
- Starring: Iván Darvas; Violetta Ferrari; Imre Apáthi
- Cinematography: Barnabás Hegyi
- Edited by: Sándor Zákonyi
- Music by: Tibor Polgár
- Production company: Mafilm
- Release date: 15 September 1955
- Running time: 104 minutes
- Country: Hungary
- Language: Hungarian

Accident or Hit and Run (Hungarian: Gázolás) is a 1955 Hungarian drama film directed by Viktor Gertler and starring Iván Darvas, Violetta Ferrari and Imre Apáthi. It was shot at the Hunnia Studios in Budapest. The film's sets were designed by the art director József Pán.

== Cast ==
- Iván Darvas as Csanádi András
- Violetta Ferrari as Zenthe Judit
- Imre Apáthi as Dr. Pálházi Jenõ
- Irén Sütö as Gerlóczy Bea
- Rudolf Somogyvári as Legéndi Antal
- József Timár as Dr. Konrád Dezsõ
- Mária Sulyok as Zenthéné
- Ádám Szirtes as Danka Lajos
- Mária Barta as Dr.Pozsonyi Magda
- Róbert Rátonyi as Ágh Péter
- József Máriáss as Jegyzõ
- János Gönczöl as Ügyész
- György Pálos as Bendics
- Gábor Rajnay as Láng Zsigmond
- János Rajz as Csermák Vince
- John Bartha as The policeman who brings Péter Ágh to the trial

== Bibliography ==
- Balski, Grzegorz . Directory of Eastern European Film-makers and Films 1945-1991. Flicks Books, 1992.
- Liehm, Mira & Liehm, Antonín J. The Most Important Art: Soviet and Eastern European Film After 1945. University of California Press, 1980.
- Ostrowska, Dorota, Pitassio, Francesco & Varga, Zsuzsanna. Popular Cinemas in East Central Europe: Film Cultures and Histories. Bloomsbury Publishing, 2017
