= Three Nights of Love =

Three Nights of Love may refer to:

- Three Nights of Love (1964 film), an omnibus comedy film
- Three Nights of Love (1967 film), a Hungarian war drama film
