= Margit Bara =

Hungarian actress (1928–2016)

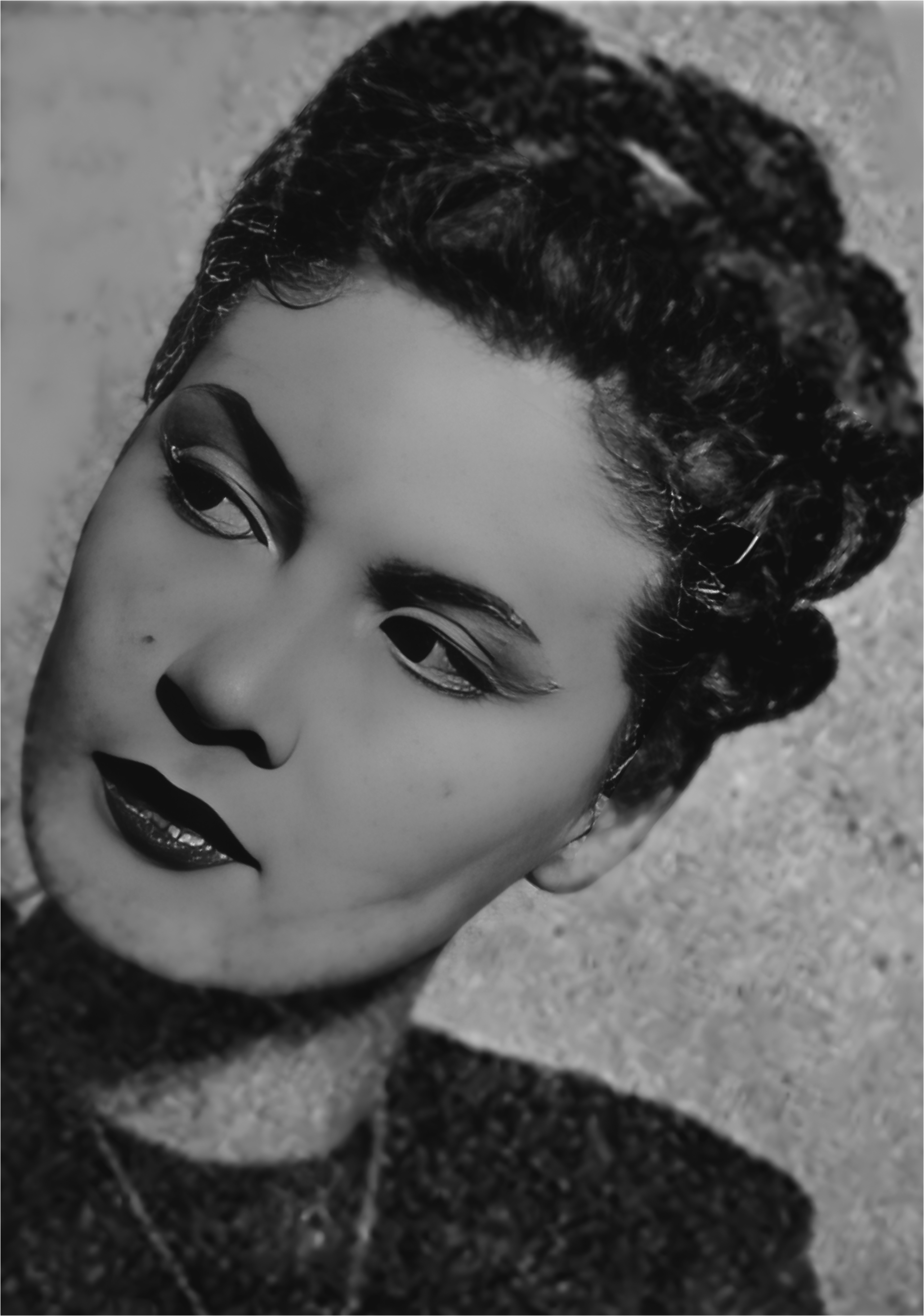
- Bara in 1954
- Born: 21 June 1928; Cluj, Romania
- Died: 25 October 2016 (aged 88); Budapest, Hungary
- Occupation: Actress
- Years active: 1945–1977

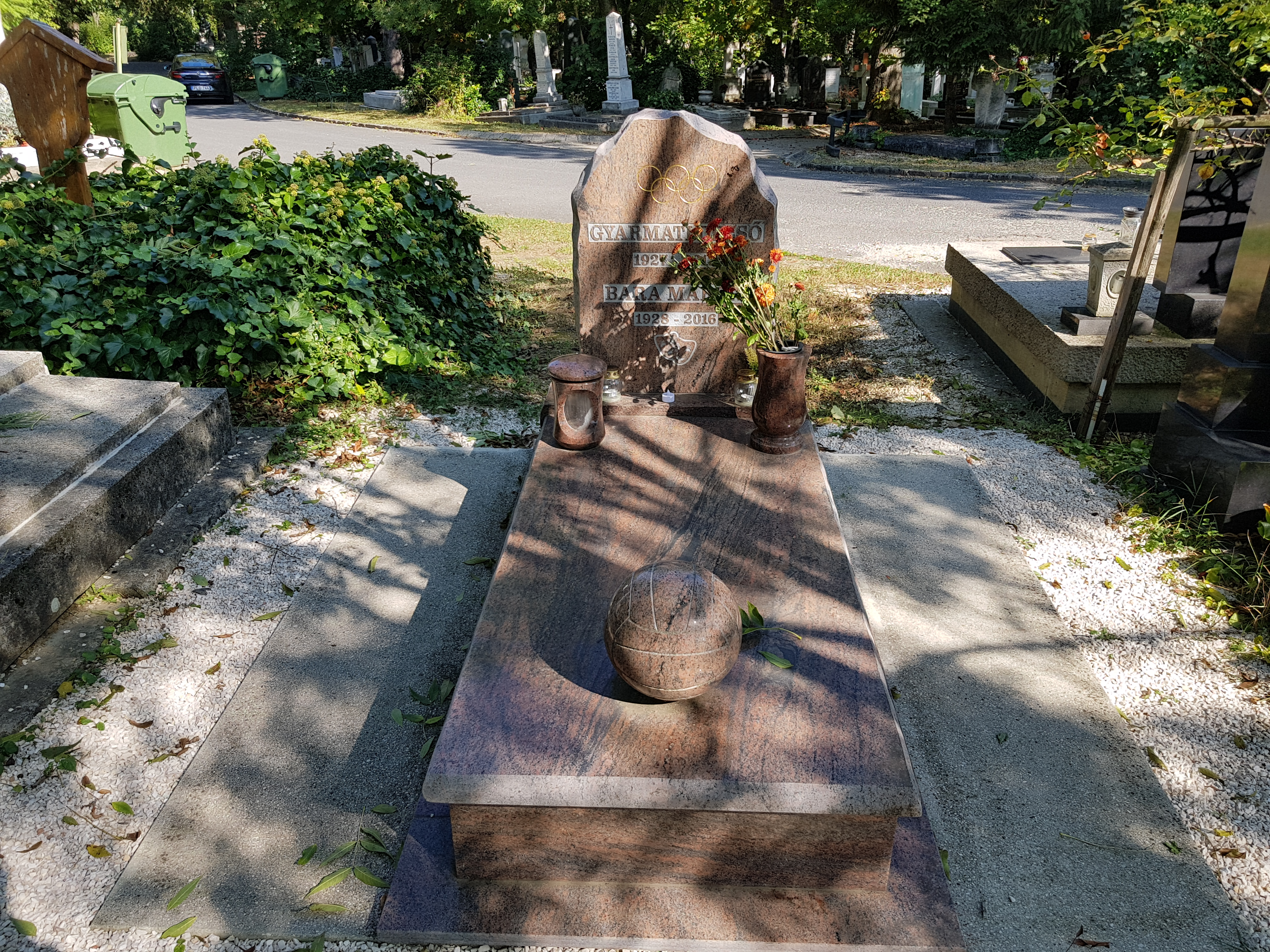
Tomb of Margit Bara in Farkasréti Cemetery

Margit Bara (21 June 1928 – 25 October 2016) was a Hungarian film actress. She appeared in 25 films between 1956 and 1975. She retired from acting in 1977 and later in 1992 received the Order of Merit of the Republic of Hungary and in 2002 she was awarded the Kossuth Prize.

== Selected filmography ==
- Dani (1957)
- Sunday Romance (1957)
- Fever (1957)
- The House Under the Rocks (1958)
- Don Juan's Last Adventure (1958)
- The Smugglers (1958)
- Danse Macabre (1958)
- The Poor Rich (1959)
- Drama of the Lark (1963)
- A Cozy Cottage (1963)
- Hideg Napok (1966)
- Jacob the Liar (1975)
