= Full Steam Ahead (film) =

1951 film

- Directed by: Félix Máriássy
- Written by: Frigyes Mamcserov; György Szinetár; Miklós Ákos
- Produced by: József Golda
- Starring: Imre Sinkovits; Marcsa Simon; Ferenc Bessenyei
- Cinematography: Barnabás Hegyi
- Edited by: Mihály Morell
- Music by: András Mihály
- Production company: Magyar Filmgyártó Nemzeti Vállalat
- Release date: 6 December 1951
- Running time: 87 minutes
- Country: Hungary
- Language: Hungarian

Full Steam Ahead (Hungarian: Teljes gözzel) is a 1951 Hungarian drama film directed by Félix Máriássy and starring Imre Sinkovits, Marcsa Simon and Ferenc Bessenyei. It was shot at the Hunnia Studios in Budapest and in the city of Miskolc. The film's sets were designed by the art director Imre Sörés.

== Synopsis ==
Railway workers in Communist Hungary triumphantly meet their production plans.

== Cast ==
- Imre Sinkovits as Szabó Sándor
- Marcsa Simon as Szabó néni
- Ferenc Bessenyei as Pongrácz
- Ilona Kiss as Pongráczné
- László Horváth as Pongrácz kisfia
- János Görbe as Patkós õrnagy
- Tibor Bodor as Holló, párttitkár
- Etelka Selényi as Fábri Éva
- Imre Ráday as Berkes mérnök
- István Szegedi Szabó as Pásztor
- Miklós Szakáts as Molnár
- János Makláry as Faragó
- Oszkár Ascher as Farkas
- Lajos Mányai as Mr.Knock
- John Bartha as Román
- Ilona Dajbukát as özvegyasszony
- Béla Károlyi as Balassa
- József Képessy as Fekete
- József Petrik as Lakatos Pali
- Endre Szemethy as Bencze bácsi
- János Zách as Kenderessy

== Bibliography ==
- Liehm, Mira & Liehm, Antonín J. The Most Important Art: Soviet and Eastern European Film After 1945. University of California Press, 1980.
