= Éva Schubert =

Hungarian actress (1931–2017)

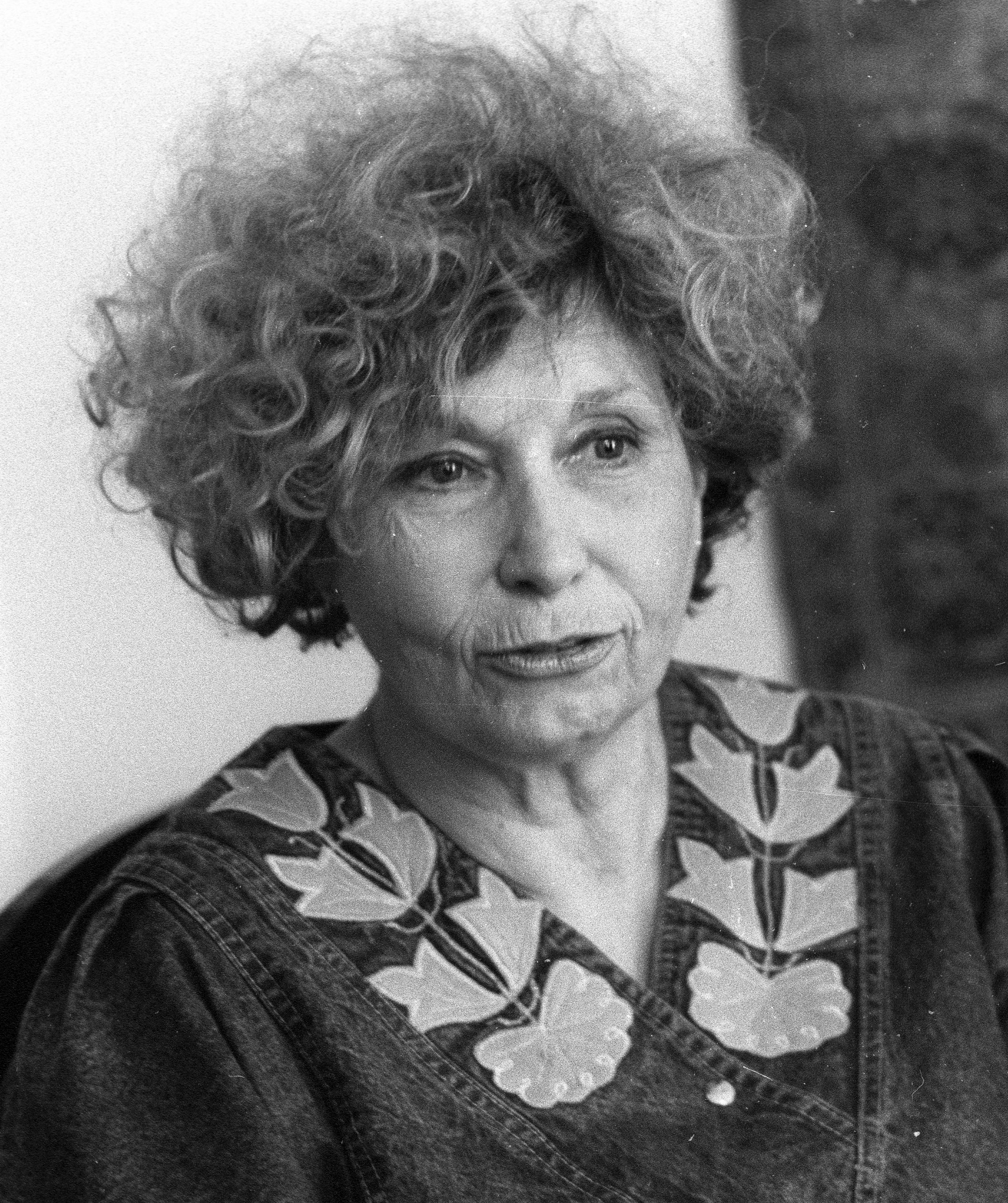
- Schubert in 1990
- Born: 19 January 1931; Budapest, Hungary
- Died: 11 July 2017 (aged 86); Budapest, Hungary
- Occupation: Actress

Éva Schubert (19 January 1931 – 11 July 2017) was a Hungarian actress, who won a Kossuth Prize in 2013 for her lifetime achievement. She was born and died in Budapest.

== Selected filmography ==
- A Glass of Beer (1955)
- The Football Star (1957)
- Don Juan's Last Adventure (1958)
- Red Ink (1960)
- A Husband for Susy (1960)
- I'll Go to the Minister (1962)
- A Cozy Cottage (1963)
