= Teri Horváth =

Hungarian actress (1929–2009)

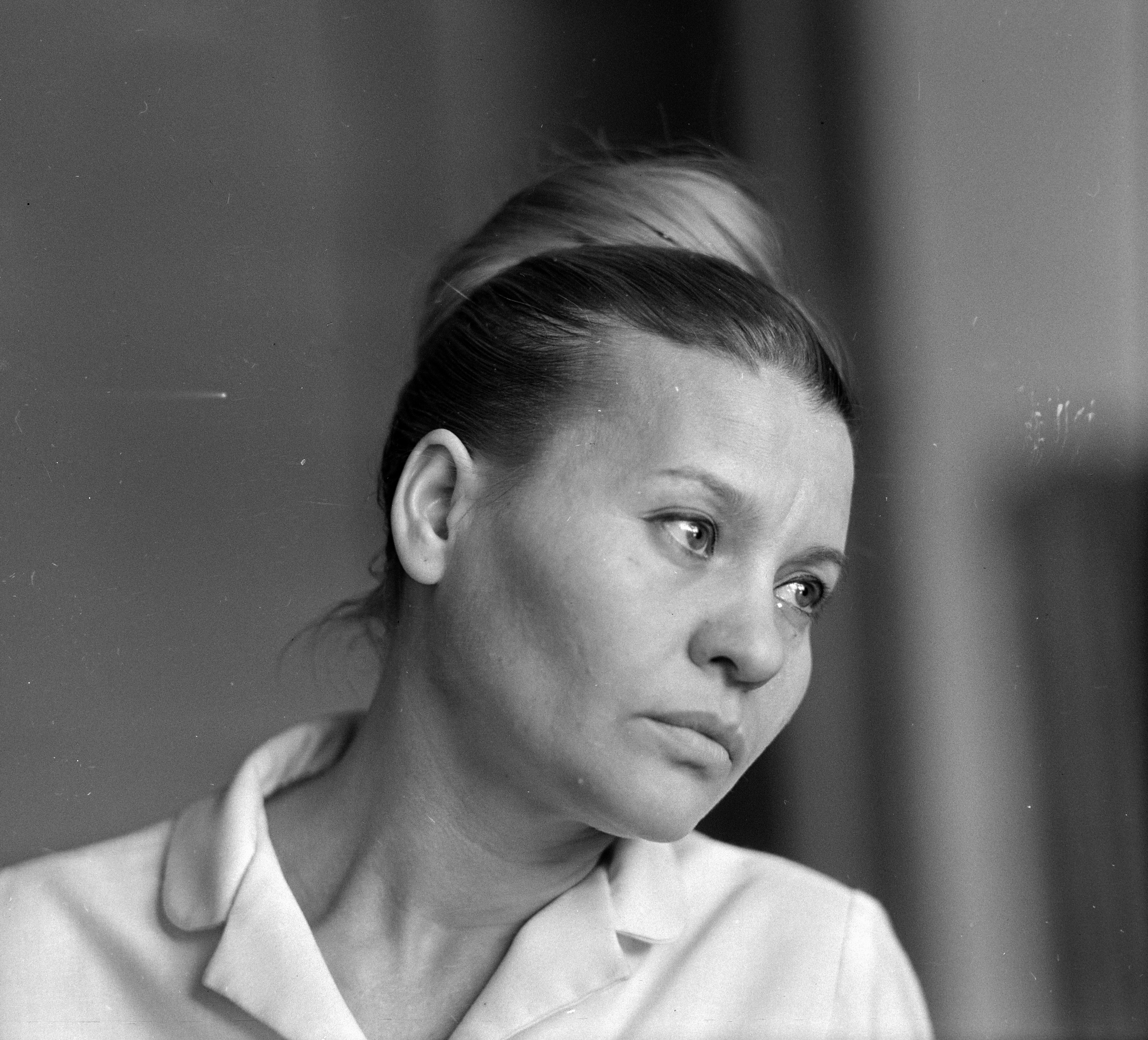
- Horváth in 1965
- Born: 17 August 1929; Rábatamási, Kingdom of Hungary
- Died: 6 March 2009 (aged 79); Budapest, Hungary
- Occupation: Actress
- Years active: 1948–1993 (film and TV)

Teri Horváth (17 August 1929 – 6 March 2009) was a Hungarian stage, television and film actress. She was a winner of the Kossuth Prize.

== Selected filmography ==
- A Woman Gets a Start (1949)
- Mattie the Goose-boy (1950)
- The State Department Store (1953)
- Under the City (1953)
- Love Travels by Coach (1955)
- The Smugglers (1958)
- Be True Until Death (1960)
- Hideg Napok (1966)
- Stars of Eger (1968)
- Michel Strogoff (1975, TV series)

== Bibliography ==
- Goble, Alan. The Complete Index to Literary Sources in Film. Walter de Gruyter, 1999.
- Portuges, Catherine. Screen Memories: The Hungarian Cinema of Márta Mészáros. Indiana University Press, 1993.
