= Mihály Morell =

Hungarian film editor

- Born: 27 December 1911; Zombor, Austro-Hungarian Empire
- Died: 2 June 2013 (aged 101); Budapest, Hungary
- Occupations: Film editor, assistant director
- Years active: 1942–1989 (film)

Mihály Morell (1911–2013) was a Hungarian film editor. He worked on over a hundred films and television productions during his career. He also worked as an assistant director on some projects.

== Selected filmography ==
- Song of the Cornfields (1947)
- Prophet of the Fields (1947)
- Hot Fields (1949)
- The Marriage of Katalin Kis (1950)
- Full Steam Ahead (1951)
- Underground Colony (1951)
- Baptism of Fire (1952)
- Kiskrajcár (1953)
- The Sea Has Risen (1953)
- Keep Your Chin Up (1954)
- Ward 9 (1955)
- Sunday Romance (1957)
- Danse Macabre (1958)
- Pillar of Salt (1958)
- A Quiet Home (1958)
- For Whom the Larks Sing (1959)
- Be True Until Death (1960)
- The Man of Gold (1962)
- I'll Go to the Minister (1962)
- Drama of the Lark (1963)
- And Then The Guy... (1966)
- The Upthrown Stone (1969)
- Dreams of Love – Liszt (1970)
- Szindbád (1971)
- The Vulture (1982)

== Bibliography ==
- Cowie, Peter & Elley, Derek. International Film Guide 1985. Tantivy Press, 1984.
- Nemeskürty, István & Szántó, Tibor. A Pictorial Guide to the Hungarian Cinema, 1901-1984. Helikon, 1985.
