= Hideg Napok =

1966 film

- Directed by: András Kovács
- Written by: András Kovács; Tibor Cseres
- Release date: 1966
- Running time: 96 minutes
- Language: Hungarian

Hideg Napok (Hungarian pronunciation: [ˈhidɛɡ ˈnɒpok], English: Cold Days) is a 1966 Hungarian drama film directed by András Kovács.

The film was chosen to be part of the Budapest Twelve, a list of Hungarian films considered the best from the period between 1948 and 1968.

== Plot ==
Taking place in 1946, the film delves into the planning and execution of the January 1942 Novi Sad raid, where thousands of Yugoslavian Serbs and Jews were killed by Royal Hungarian Army units. The narrative primarily unfolds through the recollections of four individuals awaiting trial for their involvement.

== Cast ==
- Zoltán Latinovits
- Iván Darvas
- Tibor Szilágyi
- Ádám Szirtes
- Margit Bara
- Teri Horváth
- Irén Psota
- Tamás Major
- Mari Szemes
- Éva Vass
- Tibor Molnár
