= Pillar of Salt (film) =

1958 film

- Directed by: Zoltán Várkonyi
- Written by: Gábor Thurzó
- Produced by: Lajos Forgács; Lajos Óvári
- Starring: Antal Páger; Anna Tõkés; Éva Ruttkai
- Cinematography: István Pásztor
- Edited by: Mihály Morell
- Music by: Rezsõ Kókai
- Production company: Hunnia Filmstúdió
- Release date: 11 December 1958
- Running time: 87 minutes
- Country: Hungary
- Language: Hungarian

Pillar of Salt (Hungarian: Sóbálvány) is a 1958 Hungarian drama film directed by Zoltán Várkonyi and starring Antal Páger, Anna Tõkés and Éva Ruttkai. It was shot at the Hunnia Studios in Budapest. The film's sets were designed by the art director László Duba.

== Cast ==
- Antal Páger as Mohai doktor
- Anna Tõkés as Margittainé
- Éva Ruttkai as Elzi
- Irén Psota as Mandi
- Géza Tordy as Feri
- Vera Szemere as Vera
- Ferenc Ladányi as Simics
- Miklós Gábor as Erdei
- György Bárdy as Csabai
- Imre Apáthi as Igazgató
- György Pálos as Az új igazgató
- Margit Makay as Valery
- Ferenc Kállai as Korai
- István Somló
- Zoltán Makláry
- György Kálmán

== Bibliography ==
- Liehm, Mira & Liehm, Antonín J. The Most Important Art: Soviet and Eastern European Film After 1945. University of California Press, 1980.
- Rîpeanu, Bujor. (ed.) International Directory of Cinematographers, Set- and Costume Designers in Film: Hungary (from the beginnings to 1988). Saur, 1981.
