= Imre Apáthi =

Hungarian actor and director

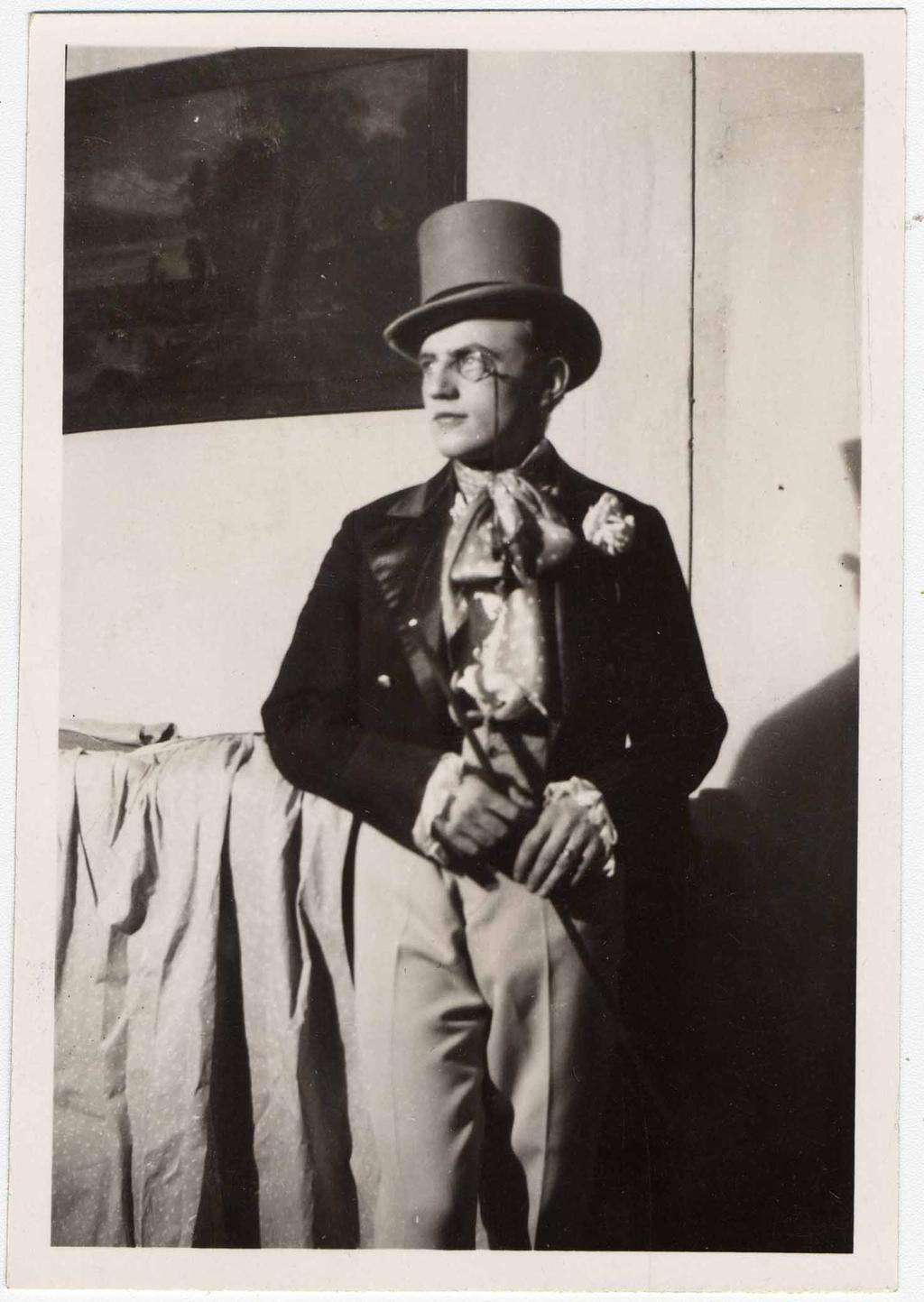
- Apáthi in 1929.
- Born: 28 May 1909; Budapest, Austro-Hungarian Empire
- Died: 22 February 1960 (aged 52); Budapest, Hungary
- Occupations: Actor, Director, Writer
- Years active: 1933–1960 (film)

Imre Apáthi (1909–1960) was a Hungarian stage and film actor and director. He was married to the actress Vera Sennyei.

== Selected filmography ==
- The Rakoczi March (1933)
- Emmy (1934)
- I May See Her Once a Week (1937)
- Sister Maria (1937)
- The Witch of Leányvár (1938)
- The Wrong Man (1938)
- Wedding in Toprin (1939)
- Three Bells (1941)
- Strange Roads (1944)
- Hot Fields (1949)
- Honesty and Glory (1951)
- Semmelweis (1952)
- The Sea Has Risen (1953)
- Accident (1955)
- A Strange Mask of Identity (1955)
- Don Juan's Last Adventure (1958)
- St. Peter's Umbrella (1958)
- Pillar of Salt (1958)
- A Game with Love (1959)
- Red Ink (1960)

== Bibliography ==
- Cunningham, John. Hungarian Cinema: From Coffee House to Multiplex. Wallflower Press, 2004.
- Nagy, Peter & Rouyer, Phillippe & Rubin, Don. World Encyclopedia of Contemporary Theatre: Volume 1: Europe. Taylor Francis, 2001
- Ostrowska, Dorota, Pitassio, Francesco & Varga, Zsuzsanna. Popular Cinemas in East Central Europe: Film Cultures and Histories. Bloomsbury Publishing, 2017.
