= György Ránki =

Hungarian composer (1907–1992)

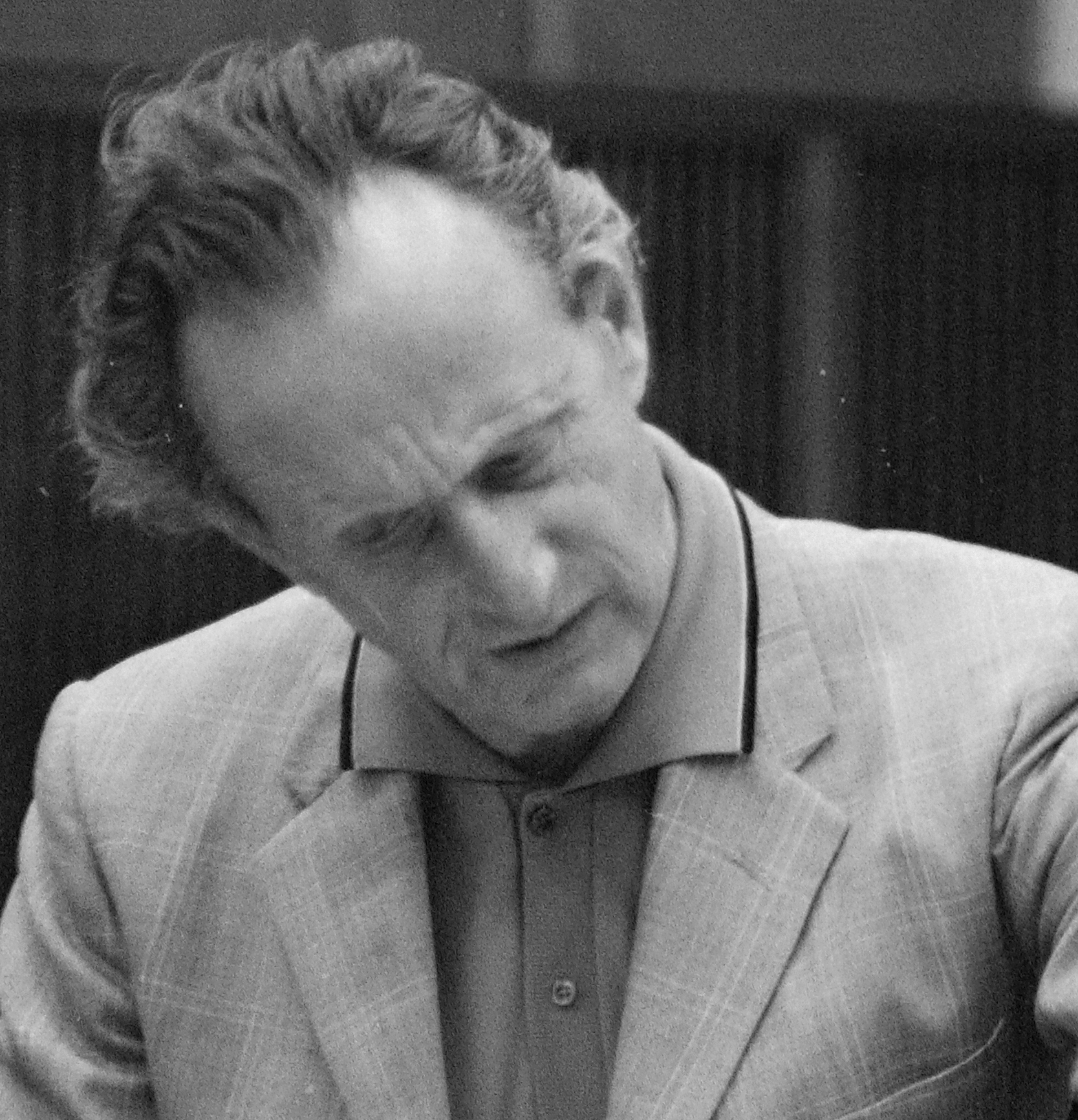

György Ránki (Hungarian pronunciation: [ɟørɟ ˈraːŋki]; 30 November 1907 – 22 May 1992) was a Hungarian composer.

== Life ==
Born in Budapest, he studied composition with Zoltán Kodály at the Budapest Academy of Music from 1926-1930. He became interested in folk music and ethnomusicology, working with László Lajtha at the Museum of Ethnography in Budapest and later further studies in Asian folk music in London and Paris (at the Musée de l'Homme). He directed the music section of Hungarian radio in 1947–8, after which he gave his attention to composition.

Ránki not only employed authentic folk melodies and musical idioms in his music but also pulled on jazz elements. He possessed a gift for the grotesque and unusual, the colourful and humorous, which may be traced in part perhaps to his studies of non-Western music.

== Works ==
His greatest successes have been stage works, above all the opera Pomádé király uj ruhája (‘King Pomádé’s New Clothes’, based on the Andersen story), which draws most of its material from Hungarian folk music. He also wrote a two-act mystery opera, Az ember tragédiája (The Tragedy of Man), based on the eponymous play by Imre Madách. South Asian influences are particularly evident in Pentaerophonia for wind quintet, which imitates gamelan effects. In some works he makes use of the Fibonacci series, following (presumably) Bartók; an example is the fantasy 1514 for piano and orchestra, which was based on wood carvings by Derkovits. He also composed incidental music for the theatre and music for films.

== Selected filmography ==
- The New Landlord (1935)
- The Golden Man (1936)
- Battle in Peace (1952)
- Fourteen Lives (1954)
- Fever (1957)
- Summer Clouds (1957)
- Danse Macabre (1958)
- And Then The Guy... (1966)
- Three Nights of Love (1967)
- The Pendragon Legend (1974)

== Sources ==
- F. András Wilheim: "György Ránki", Grove Music Online ed. L. Macy (Accessed September 20, 2008), (subscription access)
