= Vera Venczel =

Hungarian actress (1946–2021)

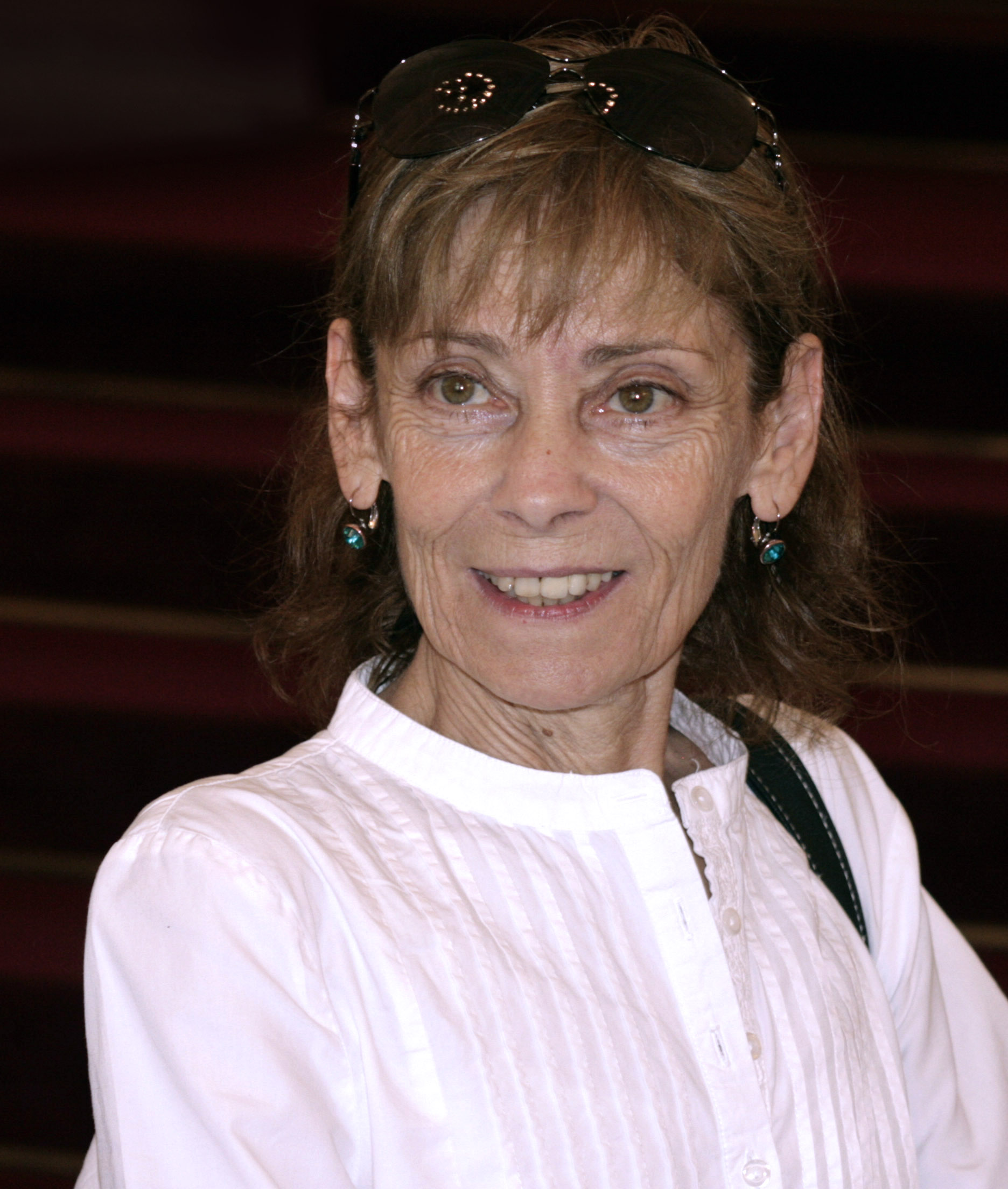
- Venczel in 2015
- Born: Veronika Venczel; 10 March 1946; Budapest, Hungary
- Died: 22 October 2021 (aged 75); Budapest, Hungary
- Occupation: Actress

Vera Venczel (born Veronika Venczel; 10 March 1946 – 22 October 2021) was a Hungarian actress.

== Life ==
She consciously prepared for the acting career since childhood.

She told journalist János Dósa Juhász about this: "My father really wanted to be an actor at the time; even later he loved to recite poems, and he probably noticed that I also loved poems when I was little".

Critics considered her an extremely promising talent.

She received her acting diploma in 1968. In the beginning, the directors assigned her a whole series of naïve roles. During this period, in 1975, she received the first state award of her career, the Jászai Mari Award for young, outstanding performing artists. Between 1970 and 1980, she mostly played the main role in 36 television productions, but not in any movies.

She also played the title role of Princess Amalfi in the 1977 radio play, as well as Evila in Black Diamonds and Lygia in Quo Vadis.

In December 2015, she had an accident during a performance and suffered a broken hip bone. Her recovery took 9 months.

She died on October 22, 2021 at her home in Pesthidegkút, surrounded by her loved ones.

== Selected filmography ==
- Kárpáthy Zoltán (1966)
- Three Nights of Love (1967)
- Stars of Eger (1968)
- The Toth Family (1969)
- A fekete város (televíziós sorozat) (1972)
- Chicherin (1986)
- The Gambler (1977 film) (1997)
- Rokonok (2006)

== Bibliography ==
- Burns, Bryan. World Cinema: Hungary. Fairleigh Dickinson University Press, 1996.
