= West Zone (film) =

1952 film

- Directed by: Zoltán Várkonyi
- Written by: Péter Bacsó; Zoltán Várkonyi
- Produced by: László Szirtes
- Starring: Artúr Somlay; Ádám Szirtes; Sándor Pécsi
- Cinematography: István Eiben
- Edited by: Zoltán Kerényi
- Music by: János Kerekes
- Production company: Mafilm
- Release date: 24 January 1952
- Running time: 108 minutes
- Country: Hungary
- Language: Hungarian

West Zone (Hungarian: Nyugati övezet) is a 1952 Hungarian spy thriller film directed by Zoltán Várkonyi and starring Artúr Somlay, Ádám Szirtes and Sándor Pécsi. It was shot at the Hunnia Studios in Budapest. The film's sets were designed by the art director Mátyás Varga.

== Cast ==
- Artúr Somlay as Ákos Lóránt professzor
- Ádám Szirtes as Kádas, István
- Sándor Pécsi as Forgács
- Éva Spányik as Takács Éva
- Mária Sulyok as Kádas édesanyja
- Hilda Gobbi as Lotte
- Gyula Benkö as Örvös Ferenc
- István Somló as Thompson
- Tivadar Uray as McLane
- Károly Kovács as Dr. Conrad
- László Kemény as Greenwood
- István Velenczei as Boswall
- Lajos Soós as Gábor, sofőr
- György Bárdy as Security Officer
- János Zách as Gál kartárs
- Zoltán Várkonyi as Mérnök elvtárs

== Bibliography ==
- Balski, Grzegorz . Directory of Eastern European Film-makers and Films 1945-1991. Flicks Books, 1992.
- Burns, Bryan. World Cinema: Hungary. Fairleigh Dickinson University Press, 1996.
- Ostrowska, Dorota, Pitassio, Francesco & Varga, Zsuzsanna. Popular Cinemas in East Central Europe: Film Cultures and Histories. Bloomsbury Publishing, 2017
