= A Cozy Cottage =

1963 film

- Film poster
- Directed by: Tamás Fejér
- Written by: István Csurka
- Starring: Margit Bara
- Cinematography: István Hildebrand
- Edited by: Zoltán Farkas
- Release date: 3 January 1963
- Running time: 80 minutes
- Country: Hungary
- Language: Hungarian

A Cozy Cottage (Hungarian: Kertes házak utcája) is a 1963 Hungarian drama film directed by Tamás Fejér. It was entered into the 1963 Cannes Film Festival.

== Cast ==
- Margit Bara as Panni - Mrs. Máté
- Miklós Gábor as Palotás
- György Pálos as Máté József
- Éva Schubert as secretary of Máté
- Zoltán Latinovits as János
- Mária Medgyesi as Mrs. Szekeres
- Nóra Tábori as Mrs. Palotás
- Nándor Tomanek as Szekeres Péter
