= Love Travels by Coach =

1955 film

- Directed by: László Ranódy
- Written by: Ernö Urbán
- Produced by: József Teuchert
- Starring: Mária Medgyesi; Ádám Szirtes; Zoltán Makláry
- Cinematography: Jean Badal
- Edited by: Zoltán Kerényi
- Music by: Ferenc Farkas
- Production company: Mafilm
- Release date: 3 February 1955
- Running time: 92 minutes
- Country: Hungary
- Language: Hungarian

Love Travels by Coach (Hungarian: Hintónjáró szerelem) is a 1955 Hungarian romantic comedy film directed by László Ranódy and starring Mária Medgyesi, Ádám Szirtes, and Zoltán Makláry. It was one of the most popular films of the era at the Hungarian box office, attracting audiences of more than five million. It was shot at the Hunnia Studios in Budapest and on location around Lake Balaton and Szigliget. The film's sets were designed by the art director Iván Ambrózy.

== Cast ==
- Mária Medgyesi as Peczöli Vilmuska
- Ádám Szirtes as Majsa Berci
- Zoltán Makláry as Peczöli Sándor
- Márta Fónay as Peczöliné
- József Bihari as Majsa Bertalan
- Manyi Kiss as Terka
- László Bánhidi as Cseppentõ Ferenc
- Sándor Pécsi as Farkas Gyõzõ professzor
- Imre Sinkovits as Kara Jenõke
- József Juhász as Gerencsér
- Sándor Siménfalvy as Cinege
- Józsa Hacser asJutka
- Attila Nagy as Citerás Miska
- Teri Horváth as Csupor Sári
- Endre Szemethy as Fejes bácsi
- Ilka Petur as Majsáné
- Sándor Peti as Bakter
- Gyula Szabó as Mag János
- Vanda Kátay as Cica
- Erzsi Pártos as Vénasszony

== Bibliography ==
- Homoródy, József. Magyar film, 1948-1963. Filmtudományi Intézet, 1964.
- Ostrowska, Dorota, Pitassio, Francesco & Varga, Zsuzsanna. Popular Cinemas in East Central Europe: Film Cultures and Histories. Bloomsbury Publishing, 2017
