= Ferenc Farkas =

Hungarian composer

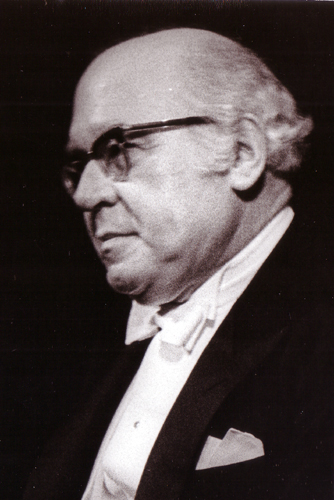

Ferenc Farkas (Hungarian pronunciation: [ˈfɛrɛnt͡s ˈfɒrkɒʃ]; 15 December 1905 – 10 October 2000) was a Hungarian composer.

== Biography ==
Born into a musical family (his father, Aladár Farkas, was an Olympian and soldier who played the cimbalom and his mother played the piano) in Nagykanizsa; he began his musical studies in Budapest, at the Protestant Gymnasium (Grammar School) and later attended the Music Academy, where he studied composition with Leó Weiner and Albert Siklós.

After his graduation in 1927, he worked as a repetiteur and conductor at the Municipal Theatre of Budapest and collaborated with the Diaghilev Ballet. From 1929 to 1931, he attended Ottorino Respighi's masterclass at the Accademia Nazionale di Santa Cecilia in Rome. The years he spent in Rome had a decisive influence on him. He became acquainted with Italian and Mediterranean culture to which he felt a deep attraction. About this he said: "My principal aim has always been to attain for myself a latin clarity and proportion.".

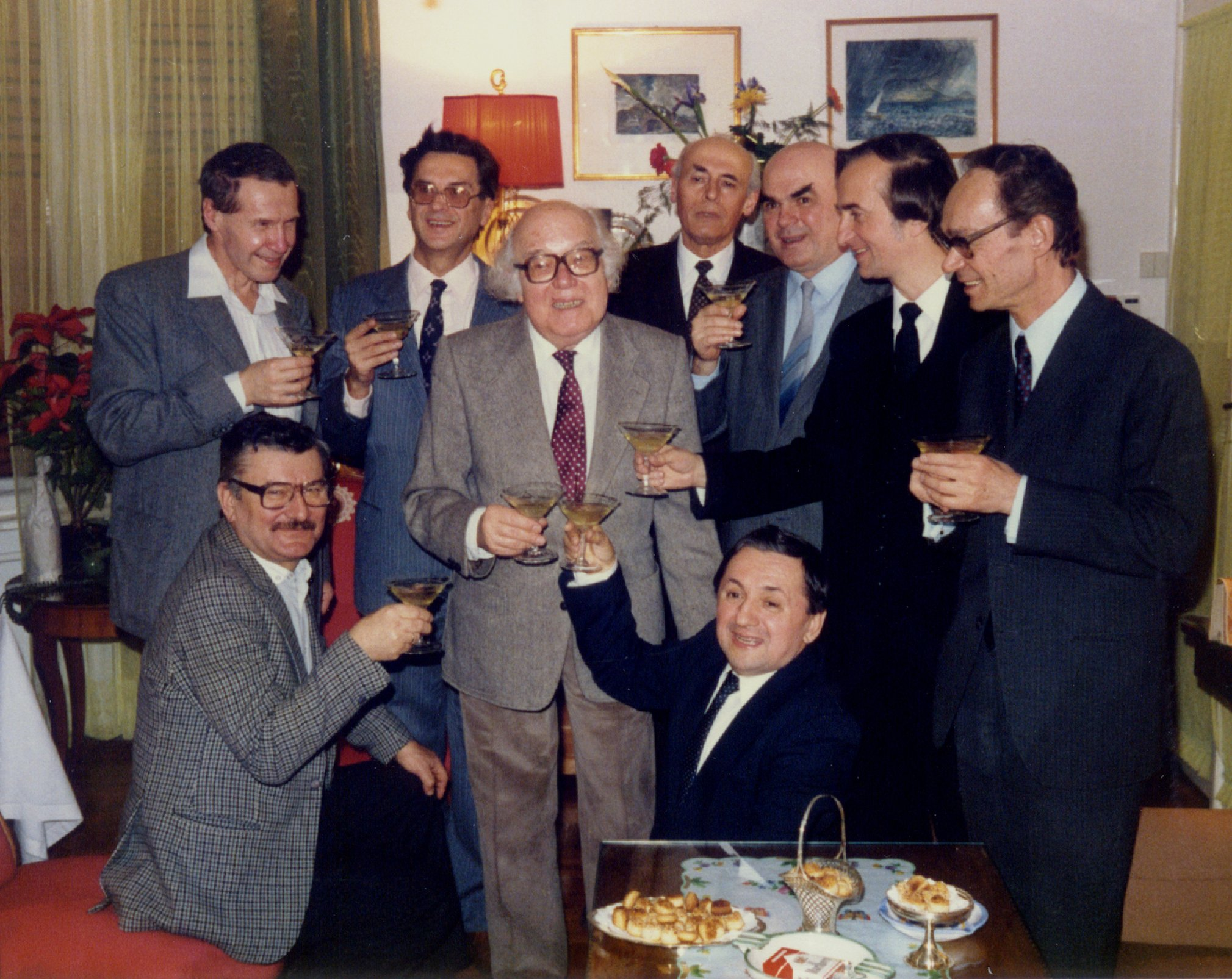
Ferenc Farkas among his students on his 80th birthday (1985). Sitting: Emil Petrovics and Sándor Szokolay. Standing: György Kurtág, Zsolt Durkó, László Dalos, Miklós Kocsár, Árpád Balázs and László Kalmár.

Farkas returned to Budapest in the autumn of 1931. As he could not find any other assignments, he played the piano in various theatre orchestras. In 1932 he met the director Paul Fejos for whom he composed several film scores, first in Hungary, then in Vienna and Copenhagen. This collaboration was to be for Farkas the beginning of an impressive series of “applied” music (music for around 75 films and 44 theatre plays and radio plays).

In the spring of 1934 he conducted research of his own into traditional Hungarian music by collecting folk songs in Somogy County: "When I got back from my travels abroad, it became clear to me that the work and research of Bartók and Kodály raised crucial problems that we as Hungarians, had to resolve ourselves."

From 1935 he taught at the Budapest City Music School. From 1941 to 1944 he was professor of composition and director at the Conservatory of Kolozsvár (today Cluj-Napoca in Romania) and he conducted the city's Opera Chorus. At the end of 1944, because of the war, he had to flee to Budapest, where he worked as the deputy conductor of the Royal Opera Chorus during the siege of the city.

In 1946, he was sent to Székesfehérvár where he founded and managed the Conservatory. He was nominated professor of composition at the Franz Liszt Music Academy of Budapest in 1949, a post he held until his retirement in 1975. As a professor he was to have his greatest influence in the second half of the century. Among his students were: György Kurtág, György Ligeti, László Kalmár, and Miklós Kocsár.

== Works ==
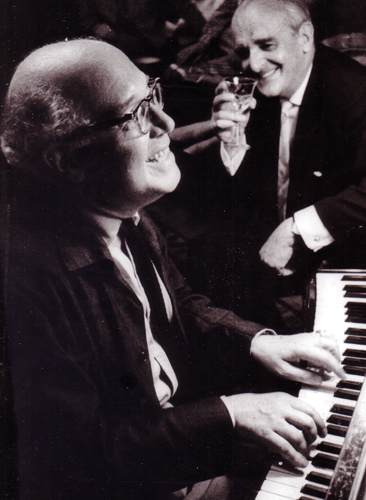
Ferenc Farkas playing the piano at home in Budapest, 1970

"From the beginning, I have been involved in all areas of music; I have not wanted to create only a small corner of a room, full of atmosphere, with a personal and sophisticated taste, but spaces, large and small, arranged differently, pleasant to live in, with open windows".

Farkas's works include over seven hundred opuses. He composed in all genres, opera, ballet, musicals and operettas, orchestral music, concertos, chamber music and sacred music. His wide literary culture enabled him to set words to music in 13 languages, stemming from about 130 writers and poets both ancient and modern.

== Main works ==
Most of the works mentioned below are accompanied by an external link referring to a single source: the official website of Ferenc Farkas (see "External Links") which provides a detailed description of the work and a musical extract.

=== Stage music ===
- Az Ember tragédiája (The tragedy of man), incidental music for the play by Imre Madách (1935)
- A Bűvös szekrény (The magic cupboard), opera (1942)
- Furfangos diákok (The sly students), ballet (1949, rev. 1956)
- Csínom Palkó, popular romantic opera (1960)
- Piroschka, musical comedy (1964)
- Egy Úr Velencéből, Casanova (A gentleman from Venice, Casanova), opera (1979-1980)

=== Works for symphony orchestra ===
- Divertimento (1930)
- Preludio e fuga (1944-1947)
- Furfangos diákok (The sly students), Suite for orchestra (1949)
- Szimfonikus nyitány (Symphonic overture) (1952)
- Planctus et consolationes (1965)
- Funérailles, adaptation for orchestra of the piano work by Franz Liszt (1974)

=== Works for string orchestra ===
- Musica pentatonica (1945)
- Choreae hungaricae, 3 cycles of Hungarian dances from the 17th century (1961)
- Piccola musica di concerto (1961)
- Partita all'ungaresca (1974)

=== Concertos ===
- Concertino for harp and orchestra (1937, rev. 1956), also revised in 1994 for harp and string orchestra or string quartet
- Concertino for piano and orchestra (1947)
- Concertino for harpsichord and string orchestra or string quartet (1949)
- Trittico concertato for violoncello and string orchestra (1964)
- Concertino all'antica for baryton or violoncello or viola and string orchestra (1964)
- Concertino rustico for Alphorn and string orchestra (1977)
- Concertino for oboe and string orchestra (1983)
- Concertino for trumpet and string orchestra (1984)

=== Chamber music ===
- Arioso for violoncello or viola and piano (1926)
- Notturno for violin, viola and violoncello (1929)
- Serenade für Bläserquintett (1951)
- Antiche danze ungheresi del 17. secolo / Early Hungarian dances from the 17th century for wind quintet (1959) (12 variants)
- Old Hungarian Dances from the 17th Century (4 Movements) - Saxophone Quartet - Published 1991 EditionDarok
- Sonata a due for viola and violoncello (1961)
- Ballade for violoncello and piano (1963)
- Quattro pezzi for double-bass and wind quintet (1966)
- Lavottiana − Suite of themes by János Lavotta (1764-1820) - Wind Quintet in 5 Movements - 1968
- Vonósnégyes / String quartet (1970-1972)
- Contrafacta Hungarica for wind octet (1976)
- La Cour du roi Matthias for clarinet, basson, horn and string quintet (1977)
- Trio for violin, violoncello and piano (1979)
- Sonate romantique for bassoon and piano (1982)
- Maschere for oboe, clarinet and bassoon (1983)
- Ricordanze for clarinet, violin, viola and violoncello (1984)
- Three Burlesques for 2 clarinets, basset horn and 2 bass-clarinets (1992)

=== Works for instrumental solos ===
- Sonata for violoncello (1932)
- Correspondances for piano (1957)
- Six Pièces brèves for guitar (1970)
- Sonata for guitar (1979)
- Exercitium tonale for guitar (1982)
- Sonata for violin (1987)
- Sonatina for harp

=== Masses ===
- Missa secunda in honorem Sanctae Margaritae for mixed choir and organ or string orchestra (other version for female choir) (1964-1968)
- Missa in honorem Sancti Andreae for mixed choir and orchestra (1968)
- Requiem pro memoria M. for mixed choir and orchestra (1992)

=== Cantatas, oratorios ===
- Cantata lirica, cantata for mixed choir and orchestra, Hungarian text by Jenö Dsida, German translated by Anneliese Eulau-Felsenstein (1945)
- Cantus Pannonicus, cantata for soprano solo, mixed choir and orchestra, text in Latin by Janus Pannonius (1959)
- Ein Krippenspiel aus Kőröshegy, Weihnachtskantate (Nativity play of Kőröshegy, Christmas cantata) edited in English, German, French, Hungarian, for narrator, mixed or children's choir, organ and instrumental ensemble (6 instruments) or orchestra (1970)
- Aspirationes principis, cantata for tenor and baritone solo and orchestra, text in Hungarian by Kelemen Mikes and Paul Ràday and in Latin by Francis II Rákóczi (1974-1975)
- Omaggio a Pessoa, cantata for tenor solo, mixed choir and orchestra, text in Portuguese by Fernando Pessoa, Hungarian translated by Ernő Hárs (1985)

=== Works for mixed choir ===
- Alkony (Dusk), Hungarian text by Sándor Petőfi (1944)
- Rose-madrigal, English, German and French version from a Hungarian text by Sándor Weöres (1947)
- Az öröm illan (The joy escapes), Hungarian text by Árpád Tóth (1962)
- Lupus fecit (1979)
- Pensieri notturni, Italian text by Michelangelo Buonarroti (1982)
- Hommage à Rilke, German text by Rainer Maria Rilke (1984)
- Pater Noster (1993)
- Ave Maria (1994)
- Come away, English text by William Shakespeare (1995)
- Ekkosang, Danish text by Otto Gelsted (1999)
- Pataki diákdalok a 18. századból / Patak student songs from the 18th century, text in Latin and Hungarian

=== Works for male choir ===
- Silence, French text by Charles Ferdinand Ramuz (1975)
- Le débat du cœur et du corps (The debate of the heart and the body) for double male choir, 2 trumpets, 2 trombones, piano and timpani, French text by François Villon (1980)
- Hajnal-nòta (Dawn song), Troubadour song from the 13th century, Text in Hungarian or French
- Vallon szerenád (Walloon serenade), text in Hungarian or French

=== Works for female choir or children’s choir ===
- Cantus fractus, 3 Hungarian gregorian melodies for unison female or children's choir, baritone solo and 3 guitars (1982)
- Baszk dalok I / Euskal abestiak, 5 traditional songs, text in Basque and Hungarian (1986)
- Magnificat for 3-part female or children's choir and organ (1994)

=== Songs ===
- Maláj ábrándok (Dreams of Malaysia) for voice and piano, Hungarian text by Sándor Weöres German translated by Marcel Rubin and Otto Horn (1943)
- Fruit basket / Gyümölcskosár, cycle of 12 melodies (edited in Hungarian, German, French), text by Sándor Weöres for soprano and wind quintet (5 variants) (1946 – 1980)
- Cantiones optimae, four songs based on old Hungarian sacred melodies from the 16th and 17th centuries for soprano or alto and piano or organ or string orchestra
- Cinque canzoni dei trovatori, 5 songs for voice and piano or guitar (1947)
- Songs from the “Twelfth night”, cycle of 4 songs for soprano or alto and piano or harp, text by William Shakespeare (1954)
- Drei Lieder for voice and piano, German text by Anneliese Eulau-Felsenstein (1958)
- Trois chansons de Guillevic, cycle of 3 songs for voice and piano, French text by Eugène Guillevic (1960)
- Kőmíves Kelemen balladája (Ballade of Kelemen Kőmíves), popular Hungarian melody for voice and piano or orchestra (1960)
- Hommage à Alpbach, cycle of 4 melodies, German text by Paula von Preradovic (1968)
- Elfelejtett dallamok (Forgotten melodies), 4 songs for voice and piano, Hungarian texts by Benedek Virág, Dániel Berzsenyi, Mihály Babits and Endre Ady (1980)
- Orpheus respiciens, cycle of 8 songs for voice and piano, texts in Hungarian, Italien, French, Spanish, German, Portuguese, English by Sándor Csoóri, Petrarca, Charles Baudelaire, Luís de Camões, Rainer Maria Rilke, Antonio Machado, Oscar Wilde and Gérard de Nerval (1993)

=== Film music ===
- Sonnenstrahl, film by Paul Fejos (1933)
- People of the Mountains (Emberek a havason), film by István Szőts award-winning at the Venice Biennale in 1942 (1942)
- The Song of Rákóczi (1943)
- The Land Is Ours (1951)
- Baptism of Fire (1952)
- Rakoczy's Lieutenant (1954)
- Love Travels by Coach (1955)
- Crime at Dawn (1960)
- Egy magyar nábob (The last of the nabobs), film by Zoltán Várkonyi (1966)
- Kárpáthy Zoltán (Zoltán Kárpáthy), film by Zoltán Várkonyi (1966)
- Egri csillagok (Stars of Eger), film by Zoltán Várkonyi (1968)
- Csínom Palkó, film by Márton Keleti and Gyula Mészáros (1973)

== Annexes ==
=== Complete catalogue ===
Complete catalogue of works. Complete catalogue of works by Ferenc Farkas developed by András Farkas, the son of the composer. This catalogue includes many musical samples.

=== Repertoire by instrument ===
Repertoire by instrument established from the complete catalogue of works by András Farkas to facilitate the research. The listed instruments are: violin, viola, cello, bass, guitar, harp, dulcimer, flute, recorder, oboe, clarinet, bassoon, horn, Alphorn, trumpet, trombone, tuba, saxophone, tárogató, piano, harpsichord, organ, accordion.

=== Bibliography ===
- László Gombos, Vallomások a zenéről, Farkas Ferenc válogatott írásai, Budapest: Püski, 2004
- László Gombos, Ferenc Farkas, English translated by Eszter Orbán, collection « Hungarian Composers » no 31, Budapest : Màgus Publishing, 2005
