= Mária Barta =

Hungarian painter (1897–1969)

- Born: 28 July 1897; Budapest
- Died: 29 September 1969 (aged 72); Budapest
- Known for: Painter

Mária Barta (1897–1969) was a Hungarian painter.

== Biography ==
Barta was born in Budapest, Hungary, on 28 July 1897, one of three children, all of whom pursued careers in art. She studied at the Hungarian University of Fine Arts where her teachers included Béla Iványi-Grünwald, József Rippl-Rónai, and Géza Udvary. She continued her studies at the School of Applied Arts in Vienna. For a time she lived in Paris. She was a member of KUT (New Society of Artists). Barta's work in the Hungarian National Gallery.

== Family ==
Barta had two brothers. All three children spent time traveling in Europe during or after their education. Barta István (festő) (14 October 1892 – 11 September 1976) was a painter creating large-scale murals, including one in the Industrial Hall in Budapest. He developed an interest in Esperanto, illustrating books and teaching the language. Barta Lajos (3 March 1889 – 8 May 1986) attended Iparművészeti Főiskola (College of Applied Arts) in Budapest. He became a sculptor. His work is in the collection of the Arp Museum Bahnhof Rolandseck. His sculpture Liebeskraft (Power of Love) is installed at Ludendorff Bridge as a symbol of peace.
