= Be True Until Death (1960 film) =

1960 film

- Directed by: László Ranódy
- Written by: Jozsef Darvas
- Based on: Be True Until Death by Zsigmond Móricz
- Produced by: Lajos F. Kiss
- Starring: Ferenc Bessenyei; József Bihari; Tibor Bitskey
- Cinematography: István Pásztor
- Edited by: Mihály Morell
- Music by: Endre Szervánszky
- Production company: Hunnia Filmstúdió
- Release date: 27 October 1960
- Running time: 95 minutes
- Country: Hungary
- Language: Hungarian

Be True Until Death (Hungarian: Légy jó mindhalálig) is a 1960 Hungarian drama film directed by László Ranódy and starring Ferenc Bessenyei, József Bihari and Tibor Bitskey. It was shot at the Hunnia Studios in Budapest. The film's sets were designed by the art director József Romvári. It is a remake of the 1936 film Be True Until Death which was itself based on the 1920 novel by Zsigmond Móricz. It is also known as Be Good All Your Life.

== Cast ==
- Ferenc Bessenyei as Igazgató
- József Bihari as Názó
- Tibor Bitskey as Gyéres
- József Szendrõ as Sarkadi
- József Vándor as Szûcs Istók
- Károly Kovács as A fegyelmi bizottság elnöke
- Zoltán Makláry as Pedellus
- Zoltán Greguss as Doroghy úr
- Irén Psota as Viola
- Mari Törőcsik as Bella
- István Holl as Török úr
- Ferenc Kiss as Pósalaky úr
- Nusi Somogyi as Gazdasszony
- Mária Keresztessy as Trafikosnõ
- Teri Horváth as Misi édesanyja
- Zoltán Basilides as Dorghyék háziura
- Márta Fónay as A kollégium szakácsnõje
- László Kozák as Nyomozó
- Ildikó Pádua as Fanni, szobalány

== Bibliography ==
- Goble, Alan. The Complete Index to Literary Sources in Film. Walter de Gruyter, 1999.
- Homoródy, József. Magyar film, 1948-1963. Filmtudományi Intézet, 1964.
- Liehm, Mira & Liehm, Antonín J. The Most Important Art: Soviet and Eastern European Film After 1945. University of California Press, 1980.
- Rîpeanu, Bujor. (ed.) International Directory of Cinematographers, Set- and Costume Designers in Film: Hungary (from the beginnings to 1988). Saur, 1981.
