= Danse Macabre (1958 film) =

1958 film

- Directed by: László Ranódy; László Nádasy
- Written by: László Nádasy; László Ranódy
- Produced by: József Bajusz
- Starring: Klári Tolnay; Antal Páger; Margit Bara
- Cinematography: György Illés
- Edited by: Mihály Morell
- Music by: György Ránki
- Production company: Hunnia Filmgyár
- Release date: 30 January 1958
- Running time: 100 minutes
- Country: Hungary
- Language: Hungarian

Danse Macabre (Hungarian: A tettes ismeretlen) is a 1958 Hungarian drama film directed by László Ranódy and László Nádasy and starring Klári Tolnay, Antal Páger and Margit Bara. It was shot at the Hunnia Studios in Budapest. The film's sets were designed by the art director István Básthy.

== Main cast ==
- Klári Tolnay as Miklósiné Zsófi
- Antal Páger as Miklósi
- Margit Bara as Schneiderné
- Andor Ajtay as Schneider doktor
- György Bárdy as Janó
- Gyula Buss as Szalóky Sándor
- Margit Dajka as Nagymama
- Ervin Kibédi as Teherautó kisérõ
- Zoltán Makláry as Marci bácsi
- Gábor Mádi Szabó as Pista bácsi, rendõr
- Mária Mezei as Smidlovicsné

== Bibliography ==
- Liehm, Mira & Liehm, Antonín J. The Most Important Art: Soviet and Eastern European Film After 1945. University of California Press, 1980.
- Portuges, Catherine. Screen Memories: The Hungarian Cinema of Márta Mészáros. Indiana University Press, 1993.
