= Sunday Romance =

1957 film

- Soviet poster
- Directed by: Imre Fehér
- Written by: Miklós Hubay
- Based on: Bakaruhában by Sándor Hunyady
- Produced by: Lajos Óvári
- Starring: Iván Darvas; Margit Bara; Sándor Pécsi
- Cinematography: Jean Badal
- Edited by: Mihály Morell
- Music by: Tibor Polgár
- Production company: Hunnia Filmgyár
- Release date: 1 May 1957
- Running time: 91 minutes
- Country: Hungary
- Language: Hungarian

Sunday Romance (Hungarian: Bakaruhában) is a 1957 Hungarian period romantic drama film directed by Imre Fehér and starring Iván Darvas, Margit Bara and Sándor Pécsi. It is also known by the alternative title In Soldier's Uniform. It was based on the 1931 story of the same title by Sándor Hunyady, which had previously been adapted into the 1938 American film The Girl Downstairs. It was shot at the Hunnia Studios in Budapest and on location around Eger in Northern Hungary. The film's sets were designed by the art director Mátyás Varga.

The film was screened at the 1957 Venice Film Festival. It was one of the most popular films at the era, with over three and a half million admissions at the domestic box office. In 1968 it was voted as one of the Budapest Twelve, the best films made in Communist Hungary.

== Cast ==
- Iván Darvas as Sándor
- Margit Bara as Vilma
- Sándor Pécsi as Bodrogi
- Mária Lázár as Mrs.Bodrogi
- Vali Korompai as Piri
- Rózsi Csikós as soubrette
- Samu Balázs as major
- Béla Barsi as Kontra
- László Kozák as Pali
- László Márkus as journalist
- Ádám Szirtes as Jakab János
- Ervin Kibédi as waiter
- György Kálmán as billiard player
- Zoltán Gera as letter barrel
- János Makláry as german soldier

== Bibliography ==
- Liehm, Mira & Liehm, Antonín J. The Most Important Art: Soviet and Eastern European Film After 1945. University of California Press, 1980.
- Ostrowska, Dorota, Pitassio, Francesco & Varga, Zsuzsanna. Popular Cinemas in East Central Europe: Film Cultures and Histories. Bloomsbury Publishing, 2017.
