= László Ranódy =

Hungarian film director

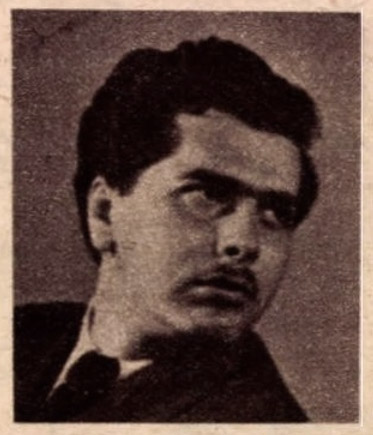
- Born: 14 September 1919; Sombor, Kingdom of Serbs, Croats, and Slovenes
- Died: 14 October 1983 (aged 64); Budapest, Hungary
- Occupation: Film director
- Years active: 1950-1980

László Ranódy (14 September 1919 – 14 October 1983) was a Hungarian film director. He directed 18 films between 1950 and 1980. His film Drama of the Lark was entered into the 1964 Cannes Film Festival.

== Selected filmography ==
- Love Travels by Coach (1955)
- Danse Macabre (1958)
- For Whom the Larks Sing (1959)
- Be True Until Death (1960)
- Drama of the Lark (1963)
- Árvácska (1976)
