= The Testament of Aga Koppanyi =

1967 film

- Directed by: Éva Zsurzs
- Written by: Imre Bencsik; Éva Zsurzs
- Starring: Péter Benkő; Klári Tolnay
- Cinematography: György Czabarka
- Edited by: Sándor Zákonyi
- Music by: Emil Petrovics
- Production companies: Magyar Televízió; Mokép
- Distributed by: Mokép
- Release date: 21 December 1967
- Running time: 92 minutes
- Country: Hungary
- Language: Hungarian

The Testament of Aga Koppanyi (Hungarian: A koppányi aga testamentuma) is a 1967 Hungarian adventure film based on the homonymous novel by István Fekete.

== Cast ==
- Péter Benkő as László Babocsai
- Klári Tolnay as Sára Babocsai
- Ferenc Bessenyei as captain Csomai
- Gyula Benkő as Gáspár Babocsai
- Ádám Szirtes as Márkó Bogics
- Gyula Bodrogi as Jóska
- István Iglódi as Miklós
