= Erzsi Máthé =

Hungarian actress (1927–2023)

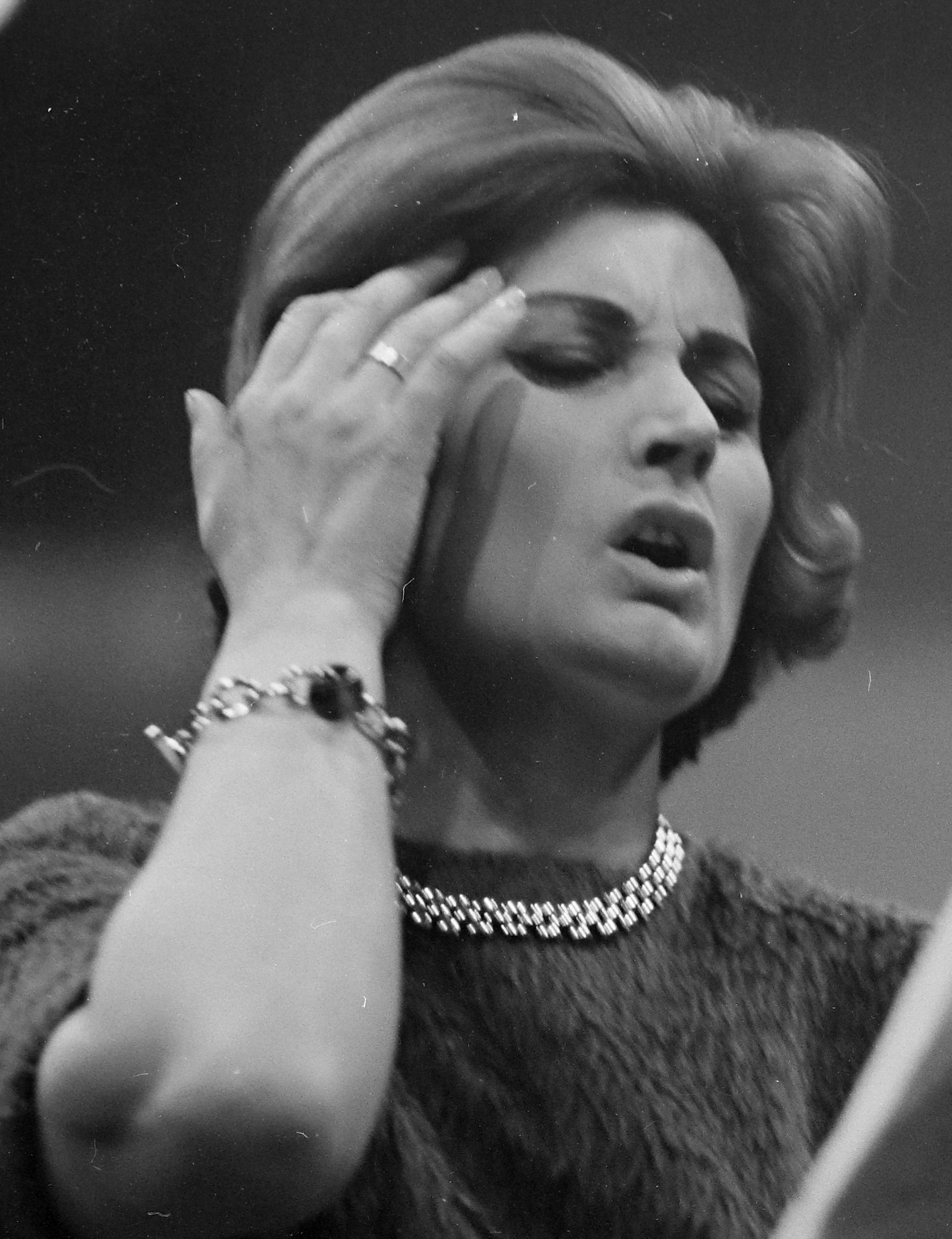
- Máthé on stage in 1962
- Born: Erzsébet Mertz; 16 May 1927; Budafok, Budapest, Hungary
- Died: 8 May 2023 (aged 95); Budapest, Hungary
- Occupation: Actress

Erzsi Máthé (born Erzsébet Mertz; 16 May 1927 – 8 May 2023) was a Hungarian stage, film and television actress.

== Life and career ==
Born in Budafok into a family of Swabian origins, Máthé made her acting debut in 1945 in a local amateur theatre company, and then she enrolled at the National Actors' Association's School of Acting, graduating in 1948. She adopted her stage name in 1949. Mainly active on stage, for over three decades she was a member of the National Theatre of Pécs stage company, and in 1983 she co-founded the Katona József Theater in Budapest.

During her career Máthé received various honours and awards, including a Kossuth Prize, two Jászai Mari Awards, and the title of Actress of the Nation. She died on 8 May 2023, at the age of 95.
