= Stars of Eger (1968 film) =

1968 Hungarian-Bulgarian film

- Directed by: Zoltán Várkonyi
- Written by: Géza Gárdonyi (novel); István Nemeskürty
- Produced by: András Németh
- Starring: Imre Sinkovits; György Bárdy; István Kovács; Vera Venczel
- Cinematography: Ferenc Szécsényi
- Edited by: Ferenc Szécsényi
- Music by: Ferenc Farkas
- Production company: Mafilm
- Release date: 19 December 1968
- Running time: 147 minutes
- Countries: Hungary, Bulgaria
- Language: Hungarian

Stars of Eger (Hungarian:Egri csillagok) is a 1968 Hungarian-Bulgarian historical film directed by Zoltán Várkonyi and starring Imre Sinkovits, György Bárdy and István Kovács. It is an adaptation of the 1899 novel Eclipse of the Crescent Moon by Géza Gárdonyi. An earlier silent film adaptation, Stars of Eger, was made in 1923. "Stars of Eger" is a direct translation of the original Hungarian title of the novel.

== Partial cast ==
- Imre Sinkovits – István Dobó
- György Bárdy – Jumurdzsák
- István Kovács – Gergely Bornemissza
- Tibor Bitskey – István Mekcsey
- Gábor Agárdy – Sárközy
- Vera Venczel – Éva Cecey
- Éva Ruttkai – Queen Isabella Jagiellon
- Hilda Gobbi – Mrs. Balogh
- Vera Szemere – Mrs. Cecey
- Péter Benkő – János Török
- Rudolf Somogyvári – István Hegedûs
- Gyula Benkő – Bali Bey
- László Tahi Tóth – Ádám, Kobza player
- Géza Tordy – Miklós
- Tamás Major – Sultan Suleiman the Magnificent
- Miklós Szakáts – Beylerbey
- Gábor Mádi Szabó – Cecey
- Zoltán Latinovits – Imre Varsányi
- Gábor Koncz – János
- Samu Balázs – Pope Julius III
- Géza Polgár – Tamás Bolyki
- Antal Farkas – Debrõi, innkeeper
- József Fonyó – Emperor Ferdinand's interpreter
- László György – Woodsmith
- József Horváth – János Sukán
- László Inke – Kara Ahmed Pasha
- László Márkus – Turkish Lord
- György Korga – Jancsika (Nikname of János Bornemissza)
- Tibor Molnár – Friar Márton
- Lajos Pándy – Fügedy
- János Rajz – Friar
- Levente Sipeki – Ádám Fürjes
- Nándor Tomanek – Preacher
- István Velenczei – György Fráter
- Endre Szász – Painter
- Ferenc Zenthe – Josef, German mercenary
- László Bánhidi – Jumurdzsák's prisoner
- Ferenc Bessenyei – Bálint Török
- Péter Blaskó – Hungarian soldier
- András Kern – Cook
- István Bujtor – Blacksmith
- László György – Blacksmith
- Teri Horváth – Woman of Eger
- Ildikó Pécsi – Woman of Eger
- Nóra Tábori – Woman of Eger
- Zoltán Várkonyi – Emperor Ferdinand I
- Gábor Harsányi
- Sándor Kömíves – old man at Cecey Family
- Hédi Temessy
