= Zoltán Kárpáthy =

1966 film

- Directed by: Zoltán Várkonyi
- Starring: István Kovács; Zoltán Latinovits
- Production company: Mafilm
- Release date: 22 December 1966
- Running time: 85 minutes
- Country: Hungary
- Language: Hungarian

Zoltán Kárpáthy is a 1966 Hungarian drama film directed by Zoltán Várkonyi and based on the novel with the same name by Mór Jókai.

== Cast ==
- István Kovács as Zoltán Kárpáthy
- Zoltán Latinovits as Rudolf Szentirmay
- Lajos Básti as Miklós Wesselényi
- Zoltán Várkonyi as Maszlaczky lawyer
- Éva Ruttkai as Flóra Szentirmay
- Vera Szemere as Mrs. Kõcserepy
- Vera Venczel as Katinka Szentirmay
- Mária Sulyok as Mrs. Mayer
- Tibor Bitskey as Miska Kis
- Iván Darvas as Abellino Kárpáthy
