= Drama of the Lark =

1963 film

- Directed by: László Ranódy
- Written by: Tamás Huszty; Dezső Kosztolányi
- Starring: Antal Páger
- Cinematography: György Illés
- Edited by: Mihály Morell
- Release date: 1963
- Running time: 93 minutes
- Country: Hungary
- Language: Hungarian

Drama of the Lark (Hungarian: Pacsirta) is a 1963 Hungarian drama film directed by László Ranódy. It was entered into the 1964 Cannes Film Festival where Antal Páger won the award for Best Actor. It is based on the novel Pacsirta (translated into English as Skylark) by the Hungarian author Dezső Kosztolányi.

== Cast ==
- Antal Páger as Vajkay Ákos
- Klári Tolnay as Tóni, Vajkayné
- Anna Nagy as Pacsirta, Vajkay lánya
- Margit Bara as Dobáné
- Mari Törőcsik as Margit
- Zoltán Latinovits as Miklós
- Ferenc Bessenyei as Latintanár
- Iván Darvas as Füzess Feri
- Zoltán Greguss as Környei Bálint
- Sándor Szakács as Cziffra Géza
- Gyula Gózon as Pincér
- Sándor Tompa as Lipiczky
- Ferenc Kiss as Bankigazgató
- József Szendrő as Orvos
- János Zách as Doba
