= Manyi Kiss =

Hungarian actress (1911–1971)

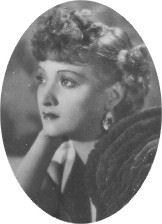
- Kiss in 1929
- Born: Margit Kiss; 12 March 1911; Magyarlóna, Austria-Hungary (now Luna de Sus, Romania)
- Died: 24 March 1971 (aged 60); Budapest, Hungary
- Occupation: Actress
- Years active: 1926–1971

Manyi Kiss (born Margit Kiss; 12 March 1911 – 24 March 1971) was a Hungarian actress known for her prolific career in theater and film. She was active in the Hungarian entertainment industry from 1926 until her death in 1971.

== Career ==
She was born in Magyarlóna, Kolozs County, Hungary (now Luna de Sus, Romania), to Lajos Kiss and Zsuzsanna Nagy. She began acting in 1926 in Cluj (known in Hungarian as Kolozsvár). In 1928, she moved to Miskolc and subsequently performed in Szeged, Hungary, from 1929 to 1932. From the start of her career, she displayed a natural acting style, exceptional dance skills, and a talent for performing comic roles.

In 1932, she briefly performed abroad in circuses with her Italian artist husband. Upon returning, she made her debut in Budapest in 1934 but was not immediately contracted by any theater. Instead, she performed at the Pódium Cabaret. In 1940, she was contracted by the Capital Operetta Theatre and also performed at other notable venues, including the Hungarian Theatre, the Andrássy Avenue Theatre, the Erzsébetvárosi Theatre, the Márkus Park Theatre, and the Vidám Theatre. By 1943, she had joined the Vígszínház (Comedy Theatre), cementing her status as one of Budapest's most beloved performers.

After World War II, she continued to perform at various Budapest theaters but was only offered individual roles, as she became politically marginalized under the communist regime due to allegations that she had performed for soldiers at the front. In 1954, she joined the Madách Theatre, where she focused on dramatic roles, such as her acclaimed performance in Brecht's Mother Courage and Her Children. Her repertoire expanded during this time to include grotesque, tragicomic, and heroic dramatic roles, showcasing her extraordinary range and precision. Her colleagues admired her ability to quickly master roles with remarkable brevity.

Her work at the Madách Theatre earned her several prestigious honors, including the Jászai Mari Award (1954), the Kossuth Prize (1957), an Outstanding Artist Award (1962), and an Artistic Excellence Award (1964).

Her colleagues only became aware of her terminal illness during her final days. She died in Budapest in 1971.

== Main roles ==
Her repertoire included Kálmán's Die Csárdásfürstin, Chekhov's Three Sisters, Molière's Les Femmes Savantes, Goodrich and Hackett's The Diary of Anne Frank, and Shaffer's Black Comedy.

== Film roles ==
She appeared in 81 films and television series from the mid-1930s to 1971.

== Selected filmography ==
- Cafe Moscow (1936)
- Viki (1937)
- Tales of Budapest (1937)
- Where Do We Sleep on Sunday? (1937)
- Billeting (1938)
- Barbara in America (1938)
- Young Noszty and Mary Toth (1938)
- Money Is Coming (1939)
- Hungary's Revival (1939)
- The Chequered Coat (1940)
- Much Ado About Emmi (1940)
- Yes or No? (1940)
- Seven Plum Trees (1940)
- Haunting Spirit (1940)
- Cserebere (1940)
- A Bowl of Lentils (1941)
- The Marriage Market (1941)
- Entry Forbidden (1941)
- Katyi (1942)
- A Heart Stops Beating (1942)
- I Dreamed of You (1943)
- It Happened in Budapest (1944)
- Devil Rider (1944)
- The Schoolmistress (1945)
- Mattie the Goose-Boy (1950)
- Baptism of Fire (1952)
- Storm (1952)
- Keep Your Chin Up (1954)
- Love Travels by Coach (1955)
- Professor Hannibal (1956)
- Suburban Legend (1957)
- Fever (1957)
- Adventure in Gerolstein (1957)
- The Football Star (1957)
- A Bird of Heaven (1958)
- Don Juan's Last Adventure (1958)
- A Husband for Susy (1960)
- Sunshine on the Ice (1961)
- The Man Who Doesn't Exist (1964)
- Sziget a szárazföldön (1969), R: Judit Elek
