= Miklós Szakáts =

Hungarian actor

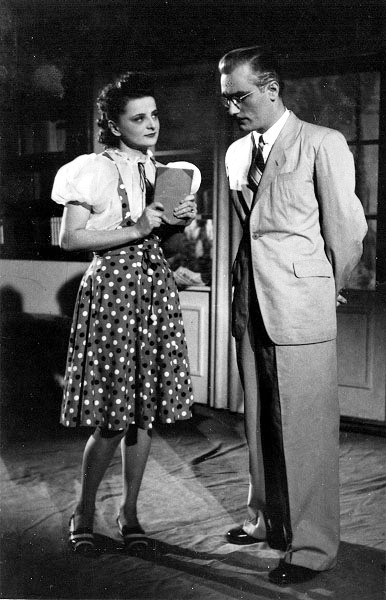
- Born: 30 April 1920; Budapest, Kingdom of Hungary
- Died: 22 October 1984 (aged 64); Bad Reichenhall, West Germany
- Occupation: Actor
- Years active: 1943-1969

Miklós Szakáts (30 April 1920 – 22 October 1984) was a Hungarian actor. He appeared in more than forty films from 1943 to 1969.

== Selected filmography ==
Year	Title	Role
1950	Mattie the Goose-boy	Bogancs
1953	The Sea Has Risen	Artúr Görgei
1964	Cantata	Docens
1968	Stars of Eger	Beylerbey
