= List of Hungarian actors =

This is a list of notable film, stage and television actors from Hungary.

Although listed in Western-, native names follow the Eastern name order.

For an alphabetical list of articles on Hungarian actors see Category:Hungarian actors.

== A ==
- Gábor Agárdy
- Andor Ajtay
- Péter Andorai
- Imre Antal
- Nimród Antal

== B ==
- András Bálint
- Ágnes Bánfalvy
- Ferenc Bessenyei
- Gizi Bajor
- Anna Báró
- Gyula Bartos
- Gyula Benkő
- Gyula Bodrogi
- Alexandra Borbély
- György Bárdy
- Ildikó Bánsági
- István Bujtor
- Imre Bajor
- Juli Básti
- József Bihari
- Kati Berek
- Lajos Balázsovits
- Ilona Béres
- Margit Bara
- Samu Balázs

== C ==
- Eszter Csákányi
- László Csiky
- Gyula Csortos
- György Cserhalmi
- Ágnes Csomor
- Sándor Csányi
- Teréz Csillag

== D ==
- Alfréd Deésy
- Iván Darvas
- Kata Dobó

== E ==
- Enikő Eszenyi
- Gábor Egressy
- Sandor Elès
- Károly Eperjes

== F ==
- Iván Fenyő
- Sári Fedák

== G ==
- Dezső Garas
- Gyula Gózon
- Hilda Gobbi
- János Gálvölgyi
- János Görbe
- László Gálffi
- Miklós Gábor
- Márton Garas
- Nóra Görbe
- Zita Görög
- Antos Gémes

== H ==
- Frigyes Hollósi
- Gábor Harsányi
- Mariska Hargitay
- Géza Hofi
- Eszter Hollosi
- Hanna Honthy
- Judit Hernádi

== J ==
- Jenő Janovics
- Joli Jászai
- Zsombor Jéger
- Juci Komlós
- Pál Jávor

== K ==
- Flóra Kádár
- Iván Kamarás
- András Kern
- Attila Kaszás
- Ferenc Kállai
- Gyula Kabos
- Manyi Kiss
- Gábor Koncz
- Katalin Karády
- Róbert Koltai
- Anna Kubik

== L ==
- Ila Lóth
- Kálmán Latabár
- Róza Laborfalvi
- Zoltán Latinovits

== M ==
- Veronika Madár
- József Madaras
- Gábor Mádi Szabó
- Tamás Major
- Margit Makay
- Károly Makk
- Zoltán Makláry
- László Márkus
- Tamas Menyhart
- Ági Mészáros
- Mária Mezei
- Attila Mokos
- Tibor Molnár

== O ==
- Lajos Őze

== P ==
- Antal Páger
- Ilka Pálmay
- Irma Patkós
- Sándor Pécsi
- Kornélia Prielle
- Ildikó Pécsi

== R ==
- Sándor Radó
- Gábor Reviczky
- Sándor Rott
- Kálmán Rózsahegyi
- Éva Ruttkai

== S ==
- Catherine Schell
- Roland Selmeczi
- László Sinkó
- Imre Sinkovits
- Artúr Somlay
- Imre Soós
- Géza Steinhardt
- András Stohl
- Gyula Szabó
- Sándor Szabó
- Ádám Szirtes
- Eva Szorenyi

== T ==
- Elemér Thury
- Géza Tordy
- Klári Tolnay
- Mari Törőcsik

== U ==
- Dorottya Udvaros
- Tivadar Uray

== V ==
- Ilus Vay
- Szabolcs Varsányi
- Miklós Vig
- Vera Venczel

== Z ==
- Ferenc Zenthe
- Zoltán Zubornyák

== See also ==
- Lists of actors
