= Katalin Ladik =

Hungarian poet, artist, actress (born 1942)

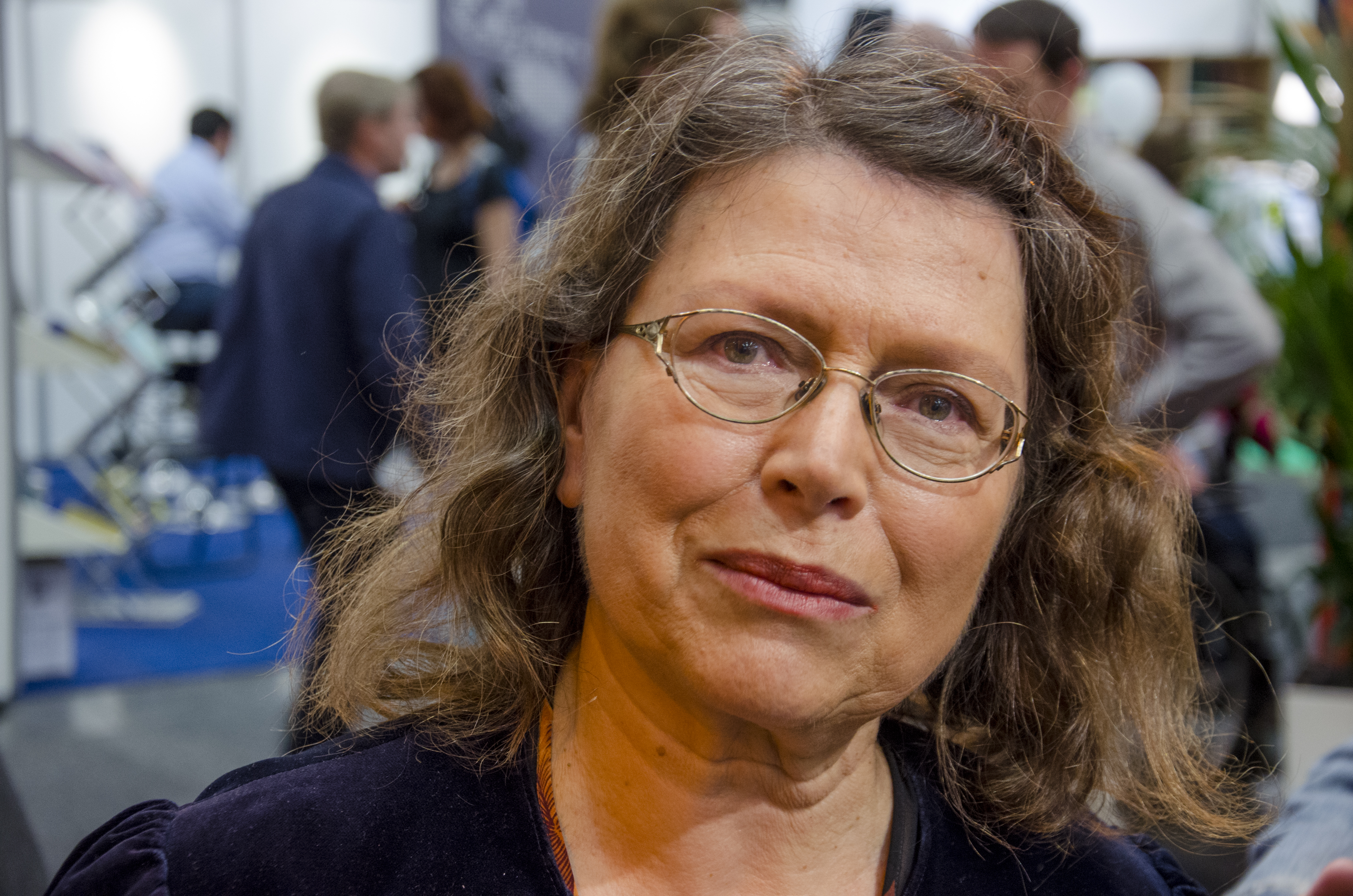
- Ladik at the Gothenburg Book Fair 2015
- Born: 25 October 1942 (age 84); Újvidék, Kingdom of Hungary (today Novi Sad, Serbia)
- Education: Dramski studio
- Occupations: Poet; performance artist; actress

Katalin Ladik (born 25 October 1942) is a Hungarian poet, performance artist and actress. She was born in Újvidék, Kingdom of Hungary (today Novi Sad, Serbia), and in the last 20 years she has lived and worked alternately in Novi Sad, in Budapest, Hungary and on the island of Hvar, Croatia. Parallel to her written poems she also creates sound poems and visual poems, performance art, writes and performs experimental music and audio plays. She is also a performer and an experimental artist (happenings, mail art, experimental theatrical plays). She explores language through visual and vocal expressions, as well as movement and gestures. Her work includes collages, photography, records, performances and happenings in both urban and natural environments.

== Biography ==
Katalin Ladik studied at the Economic High School of Novi Sad between 1961 and 1963. She then joined the Dramski Studio (Drama Studio) acting school in Novi Sad, between 1964 and 1966. Between 1961 and 1963, she worked as a bank assistant. During this time, in 1962, she began to write poetry. From 1963 to 1977 she worked for Radio Novi Sad. She joined the newly established Novi Sad Theatre in 1974, becoming a member of its permanent ensemble in 1977 and working there until 1992. She primarily acted in dramatic roles. Over the years, she also played major and minor roles in various TV-films and movies. She led the poetry sections of literary magazines Élet és Irodalom (1993–94) and Cigányfúró (1994–99). Between 1993 and 1998 she taught at Hangár musical and theatrical education center.

She is a member of the Hungarian Writers' Union, the Hungarian Belletrists Association, the Association of Hungarian Creative Artists and the Hungarian PEN Club.

== Awards ==
Katalin Ladik has earned various awards, including the Kassák Lajos Award (1991), the award of Mikes Kelemen Kör (Mikes International – Association for Hungarian Art, Literature and Science in the Netherlands) (2000), the József Attila Prize (2001), the Mediawave Parallel Culture Award (2003), the National Award for Culture of the Republic of Serbia (2009), and the Laurel Wreath Award of Hungary (2012).

Katalin Ladik has earned various awards, including the Kassák Lajos Award (1991), the award of Mikes Kelemen Kör (Mikes International – Association for Hungarian Art, Literature and Science in the Netherlands) (2000), the József Attila Prize (2001), the Mediawave Parallel Culture Award (2003), the National Award for Culture of the Republic of Serbia (2009), and the Laurel Wreath Award of Hungary (2012).

In 2015, she received the Klára Herczeg Award in senior category from the Studio of Young Artists’ Association (Hungary).

In 2016, she was awarded with the Lennon Ono Grant for Peace.

Her awards for acting include the Oktobarska nagrada grada Novog Sada (October Award of the City of Novi Sad), a collective award to the cast of Radio Novi Sad in 1967; first place at Smotra vojvođanskih profesionalnih pozorišta (Festival of Professional Theatres in Vojvodina) in 1978, for the role of Masha in Three Sisters, directed by György Harag, performed at the Novi Sad Theatre. The same role earned her the first place of Udruženje dramskih umetnika Srbije / Association of Dramatic Artists of Serbia, in 1979. Katalin Ladik also received the Magyar Televízió Elnöki Nívódíja / Award of the President of Hungarian Television for Acting Excellence for acting in András Rajnai’s TV film series, Televíziós mesék felnőtteknek (Television Tales for Adults) in 1980. In 1986, she was awarded first place at Smotra vojvođanskih profesionalnih pozorišta / Festival of Professional Theaters in Vojvodina for the role of Skinner in Howard Barker’s The Castle, directed by David Gothard, performed at the National Theatre in Subotica.

2017 Artisjus Literary Award for her poetry volume „A víz emlékezete” („The Memory of Water”)

2017 Janus Pannonius Filius Ursae Award for her literary oeuvre for „being defiant, provocative, and confrontational towards the actual literary canons”

2019 Ferencváros Pro Urbe Award

2020 „My Country” („Hazám-díj”) Award in recognition of her lifetime achievement

2021 Medal of culture for lifetime achievement, i.e. for overall creativity/work awarded by Miloš Crnjanski Centre

2021 Novi Sad" International Literary Award, which is awarded by the 16th International Novi Sad Literary Festival organized by the Society of Writers of Vojvodina

2021 Literary Prize Bernard Heidsieck awarded by Centre Pompidou for her work as a whole in experimental poetry

2022 Hungarian Order of Merit Officer's Cross, one of the highest Orders in Hungary

2022 Prize in Fiction (Poetry) category of the Society of Hungarian Authors

2022 Alföld Literary Prize

== Poetry ==
Katalin Ladik became known after 1962 through her surreal and erotic poems. In addition to a number of books in Hungarian, volumes of her poetry were published in Yugoslavia, France, Italy and the United States. Her poems also appeared in various magazines and anthologies worldwide, translated into Spanish, German, Polish, Bulgarian, Slovakian, Hindi, Chinese, Indonesian, Romanian, Macedonian, Rusyn and Slovenian.

"She is able to embody the sense of poetry as action. I saw one of her readings in Bratislava at Ars Poetica Festival and she was the only poet able to electrize the audience without any translation. (...)
She manages to pass linguistic barriers but, again, any translation of her poetry is at least difficult to be made (or should I say “performed"). Her activity covers a wide area that includes performance and sound poetry, with a force that captures any kind of audience no matter how illiterate in contemporary poetry they can be."

— Poetry Depot

== Prose ==
Her first novel, entitled Élhetek az arcodon? (Can I Live on Your Face?) was published in 2007 by Nyitott Könyvműhely. It is considered to be an eminent work in Hungarian avant-garde literature. It is partly autobiographical, partly self-reflecting. The novel alternates between reality and fiction, prose and poetry, sometimes switching to a prose poem style. Its main target audience is that part of the artists’ community who are receptive to esoteric allusions. The book is about three women: the Editor, who lives in Budapest, the Artist, and the Glasswoman who lives in Novi Sad, all of whom bear the same name. The shared name determines their lives. Initially, they are unaware of one another, but throughout the book their lives get gradually intertwined. After they get to know one another, they begin to live each other's life, which changes everything for them forever. One of the peculiarities about the book is the uniquely rich textual documentation (letters, newspaper articles, posters) and the large number of photos.

== Publications ==
=== Volumes in original language ===
- Ballada az ezüstbicikliről (Ballad of Silver Bike) | poems | Hungarian | with gramophone recording | Forum, Novi Sad, 1969
- Elindultak a kis piros bulldózerek (The Small, Red Bulldosers Have Taken Off) | poems | Hungarian | Forum, Novi Sad, 1971
- Mesék a hétfejű varrógépről (Stories of the Seven-Headed Sewing Machine) | poems | Hungarian | Forum, Novi Sad, 1978
- Ikarosz a metrón (Icarus on the Subway) | poems | Hungarian | Forum, Novi Sad, 1981
- A parázna söprű – Bludna metla (The Promiscuous Broom) | poems | Hungarian-Serbian bilingual | Forum, Novi Sad, 1984
- Kiűzetés (Exile) | poems | Hungarian | Magvető, Budapest, 1988
- Jegyesség (Engagement) | poems | Hungarian | Fekete Sas - Orpheusz, Budapest, 1994
- A négydimenziós ablak (The Four-Dimensional Window) | poems | Hungarian | Fekete Sas, Budapest, 1998
- Fűketrec (Grass-Cage) | poems | Hungarian | Orpheusz, Budapest, 2004
- Élhetek az arcodon? (Can I Live on Your Face?) | prose | Hungarian | Nyitott Könyvműhely, Budapest, 2007
- Belső vízözön (Deluge Inside) | poems | Hungarian | Parnasszus, Budapest, 2011
- Ladik Katalin legszebb versei (The Most Beautiful Poems of Katalin Ladik) | poems | Hungarian | AB-ART, Bratislava, 2012
- A víz emlékezete (The Memory of Water) | poems | Hungarian | Kalligram, Budapest, 2016
- Idővitorla (Time Sailing), Selected Poems (1962–2022) | poems | Hungarian | Forum, Novi Sad, 2022
- Béranya versek (Surrogacy Poems) | poems | Hungarian | Tipp-Cult Kft, Parnasszus Könyvek, P-Art, Budapest, 2022

=== Translated volumes ===
- Poesie Erotiche (Erotic Poems) | poems | Italian | selected and translated by: Giacomo Scotti | La Sfinge, Naples, 1983
- Erogen Zoon | poems | Serbian | translated by: Katalin Ladik, Selimir Radulović, Judita Šalgo, Arpad Vicko | Književna Zajednica Novog Sada, Novi Sad, 1987
- Stories of the Seven-Headed Sewing Machine | poems | English | translated by: Emöke Z. B’Racz | New Native Press, Sylva, 1992
- Poèmes (Poems) | poems | French | selected by: Tibor Papp | translated by: Katalin Kluge, Tibor Tardos | CiPM / Spectres Familiers, Marseille, 1999
- Ikarova senka (Icarus’ Shadow) | poems | Serbian | translated by: Katalin Ladik, Selimir Radulović, Judita Šalgo, Arpad Vicko, Draginja Ramadanski | Orpheus, Novi Sad, 2004
- Stories of the Seven-Headed Sewing Machine | poems | English | translated by: Emöke Z. B’Racz | Burning Bush Press, Asheville, 2005
- Engagement | poems | English | translated by: Emöke Z. B’Racz | Burning Bush Press, Asheville, 2006
- Kavez od trave (Grass-Cage) | poems | Croatian | translated by: Kristina Peternai | Matica hrvatska, Osijek, 2007
- Poems | English | Cultural Centre of Vojvodina, "Miloš Crnjanski", Novi Sad, 2022
- Mogu li da živim na tvom licu : romaneskna životna priča (Can I Live on Your Face: novelistic life story) | prose | Serbian |(Re) konekcija, Novi Sad, 2021
- Raspjevane žeravice: izbrane pjesme 1962-1982 (Singing embers: selected poems 1962–1982) | poems| Croatian | DAF, Zagreb, 2022

=== E-books ===
- Fűketrec (Grass-Cage) | poems | Hungarian | Mikes International, The Hague, 2003 | downloadable, pdf format
- Fűketrec (Grass-Cage) | poems | Hungarian | Magyar Elektronikus Könyvtár (MEK), 2003 | downloadable, multiple formats
- A négydimenziós ablak (The Four-Dimensional Window) | poems | Hungarian | Magyar Elektronikus Könyvtár (MEK), 2004 | downloadable, multiple formats
- Ikarosz biciklijén (On Icarus’ Bicycle) | poems | Hungarian | Magyar Elektronikus Könyvtár (MEK), 2004 | downloadable, multiple formats
- Kiűzetés ~ Jegyesség (Exile ~ Engagement) | poems | Hungarian | Magyar Elektronikus Könyvtár (MEK), 2004 | downloadable, multiple formats
- A négydimenziós ablak (The Four-Dimensional Window) | poems | Hungarian | Mikes International, The Hague, 2004 | downloadable, pdf format
- Kiűzetés ~ Jegyesség (Exile ~ Engagement) | poems | Hungarian | Mikes International, The Hague, 2004 | downloadable, pdf format
- Ikarosz biciklijén (On Icarus’ Bicycle) | poems | Hungarian | Mikes International, The Hague, 2004 | downloadable, pdf format
- Engagement | poems | English | Firefly Inx, Asheville, 2012 | downloadable, pdf format
- Stories of the Seven-Headed Sewing Machine | poems | English | Firefly Inx, Asheville, 2012 | downloadable, pdf format
- Milyen ízű vagyok? (How Do I Taste?) | poems | Hungarian | A hónap könyve, Szentendre, 2012 | buyable, pdf format

=== Audiobooks ===
2020: Liquid mirror (Folyékony tükör) presented by Vera Sípos 00:00:00 – Folyékony tükör 1; 00:55:47 – Folyékony tükör 2 Audiobooks by contemporary authors published online by DIA, the Digital Literature Academy of PIM

== Discography ==
=== Sound poetry ===
- Ballada az ezüstbicikliről (The Ballad of the Silver Bicycle) | SP | supplement for book with same title | Forum, Novi Sad, 1969
- Phonopoetica | SP | Galerija Studentskog kulturnog centra, Belgrade, 1976
- Poésie Sonore Internationale (International Sound Poetry) | audio cassette | anthology of sound poetry, Paris, 1979
- La Nouvelle Revue d’Art Moderne, Special 2. (The Magazine of Modern Art) | audio cassette | Rencontres Internationales de Poésie Sonore (International Sound Poetry Festival), Paris, 1980
- Adriano Spatola: Baobab Femme | audio cassette | anthology for sound poetry magazine, Publiart Bazar Reggio Emilia, 1982
- Yugoslavian Sound Poetry | audio cassette | anthology of sound poetry, 1987
- Hangár / Hangar | audio cassette | anthology of sound poetry, Amsterdam – Budapest, 1987
- Aki darazsakról álmodik (Who is Dreaming About Wasps) | LP | recording of the radio play "Furcsa, aki darazsakról álmodik" (Strange Is the One Who Is Dreaming About Wasps) | Radio Novi Sad, 1988
- Spiritus Noister: Nemzeti zajzárványok / National Noise-Inclusions | audio cassette | Bahia Music, Budapest, 1996
- Vajdasági Magyar Zenei Esték / Vojvodina Hungarian Music Evenings 1988 | CD | JMMT, Novi Sad, 1998
- Vízisámán / Water Shaman | CD | Budapest, 1999
- Spiritus Noister – Kurt Schwitters: Ursonate | music CD | Hungaroton, Budapest, 2003
- Vodeni anđeo / Water Angel | music CD | Nova Misao, Novi Sad, 2011
- Phonopoetics | Vinyl, LP | Alga Marghen (Milano), in co-production with acb Gallery (Budapest) Milano, 2019
- Water Angels | Vinyl, LP | Alga Marghen (Milano), in co-production with acb Gallery (Budapest) Milano, 2021

=== Music (experimental music, jazz) ===
As vocalist, Katalin Ladik collaborated with prominent Croatian, Serbian and Hungarian composers, such as Dubravko Detoni, Branimir Sakač, and Milko Kelemen (1971–73, ensemble ACEZANTEZ); Ernő Király (1963–2002); Dušan Radić (Oratorio Profano, 1979); Boris Kovač (1986–1990); Deže Molnar ( 1989–91); Zsolt Sőrés a.k.a. Ahad, and Zsolt Kovács (1996-, Spiritus Noister).

- Ernő Király | LP | Udruženje Kompozitora Vojvodine, Novi Sad, 1978
- Boris Kovač: Ritual Nova I | LP | Symposion Records, Overstrand, 1986
- Boris Kovač: Ritual Nova II | CD | Recommended Records, London, 1989
- Ernő Király - Spectrum | CD | Autobus, Paris, 1999
- Deže Molnar: Weird Garden | CD | vocals on Track 1 (Water Clock) | Studentski Kulturni Centar Novi Sad, 2010
- I Belong to the Band Bakers Of The Lost Future | CD | vocals on Track 3 (Poets Of The Absurd On Chalk) | Inexhaustible Editions, Budapest, 2016

== Poetry readings, sound poetry performances ==
=== Online Audio ===
- Fűketrec (Grass-Cage) | sound poetry | Hungarian | Magyar Elektronikus Könyvtár (MEK), 2003 | downloadable, mp3 format
- A négydimenziós ablak (The Four-Dimensional Window) | sound poetry | Hungarian | Magyar Elektronikus Könyvtár (MEK), 2004 | downloadable, mp3 format
- Ikarosz biciklijén (On Icarus’ Bicycle) | sound poetry | Hungarian | Magyar Elektronikus Könyvtár (MEK), 2004 | downloadable, mp3 format
- Kíűzetés - Jegyesség (Exile - Engagement) | sound poetry | Hungarian | Magyar Elektronikus Könyvtár (MEK), 2004 | downloadable, mp3 format

=== Live performances ===
2011

- Négy fekete ló mögöttem repül (Four Black Horses Fly Behind Me); Jégmadár (Icebird); excerpts from Belső vízözön (The Deluge Inside) | poetry reading | Dzsudi Remake evening, Merlin Theatre, Budapest | Video on YouTube

== Performance art ==
Most of Katalin Ladik's performances balance on the borderline between performance art and theatre: the performance of sound poems is accompanied by theatrical body action and in many cases, the surrounding space is structured similarly to a traditional theatre. Those who examine her poetry often refer to her sound poetry performances. On the other hand, no detailed analyses have been produced about the dramaturgical characteristics of her performances, and the relations of sign systems between her poetry and performances. It is a well-reasoned choice, however, to locate her in the context of female performance artists, as Katalin Ladik uses her body and person as the medium of her art in her performances, which occupies a special position within the history of Western art.

=== 1960s-'70s ===
1968

- Budapest, Szentendre - Hungary | UFO | Tamás Szentjóby, Miklós Erdély, Katalin Ladik | happening

1970

- Belgrade - Serbia | Pozorište Atelje 212, Podrum teatar (Theatre Atelje 212, Theatre in the Basement) | performance
- Zagreb - Croatia | Žanr Festival eksperimentalnog filma (Genre Experimental Film Festival - GEFF) | performance
- Budapest - Hungary | József Attila Művelődési Ház (Cultural Centre József Attila) | with Jenő Balaskó | literary performance
- Belgrade - Serbia | Dom Omladine (Youth Centre) | performance
- Temerin - Serbia | performance

1971

- Bačka Topola - Serbia | UFO Party | performance
- Samobor - Croatia | Samoborski Fašnik (Carnival in Samobor) | Eros sa ovogu svijeta (Eros of This World) | UFO Party | performance
- Biograd - Croatia | UFO Party | performance
- Zagreb - Croatia | Studentski Centar (Student Centre) | performance
- Belgrade - Serbia | Dom Omladine (Youth Centre) | performance
- Zagreb - Croatia | Teatar Poezije Zagreb (Poetry Theatre Zagreb) | Četvrta dimenzija kutije (Fourth Dimension of the Box) | performance

1972

- Osijek - Croatia | Annale Komorne Opere i Baleta (Annual Festival of Chamber Opera and Ballet)
- Zagreb - Croatia | Teatar ITD (Theatre ITD)| performance
- Novi Sad - Serbia | Tribina Mladih (Youth Tribune) | performance
- Belgrade - Serbia | Studentski Kulturni Centar (Student Cultural Centre) | Festival Expanded Media | performance
- Balatonboglár - Hungary | Kápolna Galéria (Kápolna Gallery) | Group Bosch+Bosch | performance

1974

- Belgrade (Serbia), Student Cultural Centre / Studentski Kulturni Centar, Festival Expanded Media /performance/

1975

- Zagreb (Croatia), Student Centre Gallery / Galerija Studentskog Centra: "Eksperimenti u jugoslovenskoj umjetnosti" (Experiments of Yugoslav Art) (Group Bosch+Bosch) /performance/
- Belgrade (Serbia), Student Cultural Centre / Studentski Kulturni Centar, Festival Expanded Media: "Ljubavi, Singer" (Loves, Singer) /performance/
- Novi Sad (Serbia), Youth Tribune / Tribina mladih: "Change Art" /action/
- Novi Sad (Serbia): "Spuštanje Novog Sada niz reku Dunav" (Floating Novi Sad Downstream the Danube) /action/

1976

- Belgrade (Serbia), Student Cultural Centre / Studentski Kulturni Centar, Festival Expanded Media: "Change Art" /action/
- Zagreb (Croatia), Gallery of Contemporary Art / Galerija Suvremene Umjetnosti /performance/

1977

- Zrenjanin (Serbia), Cultural Centre / Kulturni Centar: "Poezija, fonična i vizuelna poezija Katalin Ladik" (Poetry, Phonic and Visual Poetry by Katalin Ladik)
- Kraków (Poland): "Phonopoetica" /performance/
- Zagreb (Croatia), Information Centre / Informativni Centar: "Phonopoetica" (with Vujica R. Tucić) /performance/
- Amsterdam (Netherlands), Stedelijk Museum: "Tekst in Geluid" (Text in Sound) /performance/
- Belgrade (Serbia), Student Cultural Centre / Studentski Kulturni Centar: "Phonopoetica" /performance/

1978

- Kranj (Slovenia), Prešeren Theatre / Prešernovo Gledališče /performance/
- Sarajevo (Bosnia and Herzegovina), Youth Theatre / Pozorište Mladih, Festival Malih i Eksperimentalnih Scena (Festival of Small and Experimental Theatre): "Četvrta dimenzija – krik" (Fourth Dimension – Scream) /performance/
- Novi Sad (Serbia), Youth Tribune / Tribina mladih: "Pesnički maraton" (Poetry Marathon) /performance/
- Novi Sad (Serbia), Sonja Marinković Student Club / Studentski Klub ‘Sonja Marinković’: "Čudak je ko čekiće sanja" (Weird Is the One Who Dreams About Hammers) /performance/
- Würzburg (Germany), Hand Press Gallery / Handpresse Galerie: "Randkunst-Kunstrand" /performance/
- Novi Sad (Serbia), National Library / Narodna biblioteka: "Umetnost se ne ponavlja, ne ponavlja, ne ponavlja..." (Art Does Not Repeat Itself, Not Repeat Itself, Not Repeat Itself...) /performance/
- Zagreb (Croatia), Gallery of Contemporary Art / Galerija Suvremene Umjetnosti: "Nova umjetnička praksa 1966-1978" (New Art Practice 1966–1978) /performance/

1979

- Subotica (Serbia), Youth Centre / Dom Omladine: "Az éneklő varrógép – The Singing Sewing Machine" (with Zsolt Király) /performance/
- Novi Sad (Serbia), Youth Tribune / Tribina Mladih: "The Screaming Hole – A sikoltozó lyuk" /performance/
- Amsterdam (Netherlands): "One World Poetry" /performance/
- Utrecht (Netherlands), Gallery ‘T Hoogt / ‘T Hoogt Galerie: "One World Poetry" /performance/
- Novi Sad (Serbia), Youth Tribune / Tribina Mladih: "Mesék a hétfejű varrógépről" (Stories of the Seven-headed Sewing Machine) /performance/

=== 1980s-'90s ===
1980

- Paris (France), Pompidou Centre / Centre Georges Pompidou: "Rencontres Internationales de Poésie Sonore" (International Sound Poetry Festival) /performance/
- Le Havre (France), Cultural Centre of Le Havre / Maison de la Culture du Havre: "Rencontres Internationales de Poésie Sonore" (International Sound Poetry Festival) /performance/
- Rennes (France), Cultural Centre of Rennes / Maison de la Culture de Rennes: "Rencontres Internationales de Poésie Sonore" (International Sound Poetry Festival) /performance/
- New York City (USA), Washington Square Church, The New Wilderness Foundation: "International Sound Poetry Festival" /performance/
- Baltimore (USA), School 33 Art Center, The Merzaum Collective's Desire Productions Present: International Festival of Disappearing Art(s) /performance/
- Gyula (Hungary), Castle Theatre / Várszínház, Knights’ Hall / Lovagterem: "Alice" /performance/
- Belgrade (Serbia), Salon Museum of Contemporary Art / Salon Muzeja Savremene Umetnosti, Exhibition of Group Bosch+Bosch: "Orman koji ubrizgava (Injecting Closet)" /performance/

1982

- Budapest (Hungary), Cultural Centre Jókai, Studio ‘K’/ Stúdió ‘K’ Jókai Művelődési Központ: "Ladik Katalin újvidéki költő és előadóművész szerzői estje" (An Evening with Novi Sad Poet and Performer, Katalin Ladik) /performance/
- Novi Sad (Serbia), Cultural Centre Petőfi Sándor / Petőfi Sándor Művelődési Ház: "Telepi esték – Ladik Katalin szerzői estje" (Evenings in Telep – with Poet Katalin Ladik) (with Ottó Tolnai, Zsolt Király) /performance/
- Budapest (Hungary), Young Artists’ Club / Fiatal Művészek Klubja: "Ladik Katalin szerzői estje" (An Evening with Katalin Ladik) (with Miklós Erdély, László Beke and Zsolt Király) /performance/
- Budapest (Hungary), Cultural Centre Jókai, Studio ‘K’ / Stúdió ‘K’ Jókai Művelődési Központ: "Ladik Katalin szerzői és előadói estje" (An Evening with Katalin Ladik) (with Miklós Erdély, László Beke and Zsolt Király) /performance/
- Belgrade (Serbia), Museum of Contemporary Art / Muzej Savremene Umetnosti: "Verbo-Voko-Vizuelno" ("Phonopoetry" with Judita Šalgo) /performance/
- Osijek (Croatia), Students’ Youth Centre / Studentski Centar Mladih, Osiječko ljeto (Summer in Osijek): "Čudak je ko čekiće sanja" (Weird Is the One Who Dreams About Hammers) /performance/
- Belgrade (Serbia), Youth Centre / Dom Omladine: "Ikar u metrou” (Icarus on the Subway) (with Judita Šalgo, Selimir Radulović) /performance/
- Belgrade (Serbia), Youth Centre / Dom Omladine, Beogradsko leto (Summer in Belgrade): "Ufo Party" /performance/
- Kanjiža (Serbia), Literary Camp / Književna Kolonija: "Konkretna i vizuelna poezija" (Concrete and Visual Poetry) (with Vujica R. Tucić and Bob Cobbing) /performance/
- Novi Sad (Serbia), Address: Istarski kej 37. sp. 8. st. Rade Šević: "Sound Poetry Performance" (with Vujica R. Tucić and Bob Cobbing) /performance/
- Novi Sad (Serbia), Youth Tribune Gallery / Tribina Mladih Galerija: "Phonopoemim" – Exhibition Launch for Slavica Grkavac: tapiserije "Jokastin kompleks" ("Jocasta Complex" Tapestry) /performance/
- Paris (France), UNESCO: "Guerre a la guerre" (War Against War) /performance/
- Milan (Italy), UNESCO: "Guerra alla guerra" (War Against War) /performance/
- Paris (France), UNESCO Pompidou Centre / Centre Georges Pompidou: "Polyphonix 5" /performance/

1983

- Vienna (Austria), Wiener Festwochen (Vienna Festival): "Mandora 1." /performance/
- Zagreb (Croatia), Gallery of Contemporary Art / Galerija Suvremene Umjetnosti: "Nova umjetnost u Srbiji 1970-1980" (New Art of Serbia 1970–1980)
- Belgrade (Serbia), Youth Centre / Dom Omladine: "Oluja-po motivima Šekspira" (Tempest – Based on Shakespeare) – Exhibition Launch for Slavica Grkavac: tapiserije "Jokastin kompleks" ("Jocasta Complex" Tapestry) /performance/
- Belgrade (Serbia), Youth Centre / Dom Omladine: "Magic Bread" (with Paul Pignon)

1984

- Glasgow (UK), Third Eye Centre, Poetsound 1984: "Mandora 1." /performance/
- Milan (Italy), (Cultural Association of) Cooperativa Intrapresa: "Milanopoesia" /performance/
- Szeged (Hungary), József Attila University (Today: University of Szeged) / József Attila Tudományegyetem: "Mandora 1." /performance/
- Cogolin (France), Rencontres Internationales de Poésie Contemporaine (International Festival of Contemporary Poetry): "Mandora 1." /performance/
- Belgrade (Serbia), Cultural Centre / Kulturni Centar: "Mandora 1." /performance/

1985

- Belgrade (Serbia), Magaza Theatre / Pozorište Magaza: "Mandora 2." /performance/
- Budapest (Hungary), Cultural Cente of Lágymányos / Lágymányosi Művelődési Otthon: "Mandora 2." /performance/
- Budapest (Hungary), Metropolitan Cultural Centre / Fővárosi Művelődési Ház: "Alice" /performance/
- Zemun (Serbia), Festival Monodrame i Pantomime (Festival of Monodrama and Pantomimes): "Mandora" /performance/
- Novi Sad (Serbia), ‘Sonja Marinković’Cultural Centre / Kulturni Centar ‘Sonja Marinković’, Youth Tribune / Tribina Mladih: "Mandora" /performance/
- Stari Bečej (Serbia) /performance/

1988

- Szeged (Hungary), JATE Club: "Polyphonix" /performance/
- Pécs (Hungary): "Alice" /performance/
- Budapest (Hungary), Vigadó Chamber Hall / Vigadó Kamaraterem, Hangár Est (‘Wall of Sound’ Evening): "Alice" /performance/

1989

- Spoleto (Italy): "O Fortuna" /performance/
- Nové Zámky (Slovakia): "O Fortuna" /performance/
- Novi Sad (Serbia): "O Fortuna" /performance/

1990

- Novi Sad (Serbia), Sport and Activity Centre of Vojvodina / SPENS Sportski i Poslovni Centar Vojvodina: "Otkrovenje" (Revelation) (with Zoltán Pletl) /performance/
- Vác (Hungary), Greek Chapel / Görög Templom, Ex-panzió 2. Festival: "Angyal/Angel" /performance/
- Novi Sad (Serbia): "Seraphine Tanz" /performance/

1993

- Szentendre (Hungary), Dalmát Cellar / Dalmát pince, UHF Kisújrevue /performance/
- Szeged (Hungary), JATE Club: "Alice" /performance/
- Vác (Hungary), Greek Chapel / Görög Templom, Expanzió 5. Festival /performance/

1994

- Szeged (Hungary): "Performancia" with Lukács Bitskey /performance/
- Zebegény (Hungary): "A helyettesítő asszony (The Substitute)" /performance/
- Pécs (Hungary): "A négydimenziós ablak (The Four-dimensional Window)" with Tamás Szalay /performance/

1995

- Marseille (France), International Poetry Centre / Centre International de Poèsie: "Kassák" /performance/

1996

- Marseille (France), Meyer Gallery / Galerie Meyer: "L’ agneau de Dieu et le double" (The Lamb of God and Its Double) /performance/
- Ajaccio – Corsica (France): "L’ agneau de Dieu et le double" (The Lamb of God and Its Double) /performance/

=== 2000s ===
2002

- Novi Sad (Serbia), Cultural Centre of Novi Sad / Kulturni Centar Novog Sada, INFANT (International Festival of Alternative and New Theatre): "Fűketrec / Grass-cage"

2003

- Novi Sad (Serbia), Chamber Theatre of Music / Kamerno Pozorište Muzike, INTERZONE Festival: "Tesla – Project" /performance/

2004

- Monza (Italy) /performance/
- Salerno (Italy) /performance/
- Novi Sad (Serbia), Chamber Theatre of Music / Kamerno Pozorište Muzike, INTERZONE Festival: "Tesla – Project"
- Budapest (Hungary), A38 Ship / A38 hajó: "Lomtalanítás" (Cleaning the House) /performance/
- Budapest (Hungary), Ludwig Museum – Museum of Contemporary Art / Ludwig Múzeum – Kortárs Művészeti Múzeum: "Torony-Lomtalanítás" (Cleaning the Tower-House) /performance/

2005

- Terény (Hungary), Expanzió Festival: "Angel" /performance/

2006

- Budapest (Hungary), Serbian Theatre in Hungary / Magyarországi Szerb Színház / Srpsko Pozorište u Mađarskoj: "Tesla", /audio-visual oratorio/
- Otterlo (Netherlands), Kröller-Müller Museum: "Change Art" /action/
- Amsterdam (Netherlands): "Tesla" /performance/
- Novi Sad (Serbia), Sport and Activity Centre of Vojvodina / SPENS Sportski i Poslovni Centar Vojvodina, Inventors Association of Vojvodina, TeslaFest: "Tesla" /performance/

2007

- Nové Zámky (Slovakia), Art Gallery / Galéria Umenia: "Gyakorlatok üres húrokon – Kassák-kód" (Exercises on Empty Strings - Kassák Code) /performance/
- Budapest (Hungary), Erlin Club Gallery / Erlin Klub Galéria: "Fűketrec" (Grass-cage) /performance/
- Budapest (Hungary), Mu Theatre / Mu Színház: "Az Eszmélet szövedéke" (The Weave of Consciousness) (with Péter Bajka, Bern Atom Santi, Eszter Bereczky, Zsófia Varga) /performance/
- Verőce (Hungary), Ekszpanzió XX Festival: "Tesla, Audio-visual Oratorio" /performance/
- Szigliget (Hungary), Artist House of the Hungarian Public Foundation for Creative Art / Magyar Alkotóművészeti Közalapítvány Alkotóháza, József Attila Kör 18. irodalmi tábora (18th Literary Camp of the József Attila Circle): "Az Eszmélet szövedéke" (The Weave of Consciousness) (with Péter Bajka, Bern Atom Santi, Eszter Bereczky, Zsófia Varga) /performance/

2008

- Budapest (Hungary), Petőfi Literary Museum / Petőfi Irodalmi Múzeum, A Szépírók Társasága V. őszi irodalmi fesztiválja – Nők a férfi birodalomban (5th Autumn Literary Festival of the Hungarian Belletrist Association – Women in a Men's World): "Diptichon" (with Endre Szkárosi), performance
- Belgrade (Serbia), ARTGET Gallery – Cultural Centre Belgrade / Galerija ARTGET – Kulturni Centar Beograda (World Poetry Day): "Tesla – Homo Galacticus" /performance/
- Szigliget (Hungary), József Attila Kör 20. irodalmi tábora (20th Literary Camp of the József Attila Circle): "Trip-ti-chon" (with Veronika Czapáry), performance
- Budapest (Hungary), Irodalmi Centrifuga (Literary Centrifuge): "Trip-ti-chon" (with Veronika Czapáry), performance
- Bratislava (Slovakia), Ars Poetica Medzinárodny Festival Poézie /The 6th Ars Poetica International Poetry Festival /sound poetry performance

2009

- Visegrád (Hungary), The Roof Terrace of King Matthias Museum / A Mátyás Király Múzeum tetőterasza, Ekszpanzió XXI Festival: “Kerub" (Cherub) /performance/

=== 2010s ===
2010

- Budapest (Hungary), Gallery A22 / A22 Galéria, Tibor Papp's Exhibition Opening: "Óraköltemény" (Poem-Clock) /performance/
- Subotica (Serbia), Kosztolányi Dezső Theatre / Kosztolányi Dezső Színház: "Tesla – Homo Galacticus" /performance/
- Budapest (Hungary), Millenáris Theatre / Millenáris Teátrum, Book Festival: "Szabadkőműves szex" (Freemason Sex) (with drMáriás) /performance/
- Štaglinec (Croatia), "Voda" – "Water" Međunarodni Susret Umjetnika (International Art Festival): "Veliko spremanje" (Spring Cleaning) /performance/
- Eger (Hungary), Small Synagogue Gallery of Contemporary Art / Kis Zsinagóga Kortárs Galéria, artAlom élőművészeti fesztivál (artAlom Performing Arts Festival): "Bukott angyalok" (Fallen Angels) /performance/
- Szeged (Hungary) – Subotica (Serbia), Railway line, Kultúrcsempész Sínbusz Fesztivál (Culture-smuggler Railbus Festival): Megaphone-assisted readings by Gábor Virág, Slobodan Tišma, Gábor Lanczkor, Tamara Šuškić, Vladimir Kopicl, Katalin Ladik, Siniša Tucić, Roland Orcsik

2011

- Budapest (Hungary), Kunsthalle (Palace/Hall of Art) / Műcsarnok: "Preparababrakabaré" /performance/
- Marseille (France), Museum of Contemporary Art / Musée d'Art Contemporain, Poésie Marseille 2011, 8ème Festival (8th Marseille Poetry Festival, 2011): "Le Grand Ménage" (Spring Cleaning) /performance/
- Târgu Mureș (Romania), National Theatre - Small Hall / Teatrul Naţional – Sala Mică, Testet öltött szavak rendezvény (Words Embodied – Event series): "Alice" /performance/
- Budapest (Hungary), Mu Theatre / Mu Színház, Ismeretlen kutatása improvizációs alkotóműhely (Searching the Unknown – Improvisational Workshop): "Hangmozdulat" (Sound Movement) (with Kati Dombi) /performance/

2012

- Budapest (Hungary), Hungarian Writers' Association / Magyar Írószövetség: XXIV. Ekszpanzió Festival, "Idézet" Szimpozion és Kiállítás ("Quotation" Symposium and Exhibition): "Ásó, kapa, nagyharang" ("Till Death" lit.: Spade, Hoe and Bell) /performance/
- Komárom (Hungary), Fort Monostor – Film Museum / Monostori Erőd – Filmmúzeum, Mediawave 2012 Festival: "Nagytakarítás" ("Spring Cleaning") /performance/
- Łódź (Poland), MS2 – Lodz Museum of Art / MS2 – Muzeum Sztuki w Łodzi: "Alicja w krainie kodów" (Alice in Codeland) /performance/
- Budapest (Hungary), Address: 8th district, Pál street 6.: Gödör bújócska – irodalom, zene, film, tánc, színház, beszélgetés (Gödör Club Hide-and-seek – literature, music, film, dance, theatre, discussions) /sound poetry performance/
- Ottawa, Ontario, Canada, City Hall Art Gallery, A B Series Workshop: "Nagytakarítás" ("Spring Cleaning") /performance/

Ottawa, Ontario, Canada, Arts Court Theatre, A B Series: "Alice Kódországban" ("Alice in Codeland") /performance/

2013

- Budapest (Hungary), Óbudai Társaskör, Kassák Museum, Kassák Year: "Alice Kódországban" (Alice in Codeland) /performance/
- Hvar (Croatia), 17th International Festival of Radio Plays and Documentary Radio Dramas PRIX MARULIĆ, „Tesla. Homo Galacticus” /performance/
- Székesfehérvár (Hungary), Vörösmarty Theatre Studio, Contemporary Art Festival: "Alice Kódországban" (Alice in Codeland) /performance/
- Budapest (Hungary), Fuga, Autonómia Filmklub 5, „I Belong to the Band”: Katalin Ladik's voice on „poets of the absurd on chalk”

2014

- Százhalombatta (Hungary), Katalin Ladik - Endre Szkárosi, Slam Poetry /performance/
- Budapest (Hungary), Mika Tivadar Vigadó, JazzaJ, Katalin Ladik – Jean Michel van Schowburg, Katalin Ladik – Zsolt Sőrés, „Sounds to Go” (Hangok elvitelre) /performance/

2015

- Eger (Hungary), Templom Gallery, artAlom Live Art Festival 2015: "Tranzit Zoon", performance
- Gothenburg (Sweden), Gothenburg Book Fair "Tranzit Zoon", performance
- Vienna (Austria), Campus AAKH Hof 7, Universität Wien, "Singende Schnittmuster – Singing Dress Pattern", lecture-performance, multimedia slide-show

2016

- Poreč (Croatia), Behind the Scenes with Katalin Ladik! Artists on Vacation: "The Sounds of a sewing machine", Circe di Parenzo” /performance/,
- Budapest (Hungary), MÜSZI, @Transart Communication, Katalin Ladik & Zsolt Sőrés „Alchemical Wedding” (Alkímiai nász) /performance/
- Milano (Italy), FM Centre for Contemporary Art, Non-Aligned Modernity. Eastern-European Art from the Marinko Sudac Collection. Katalin Ladik: “Tranzit Zoon” /performance/

2017

- Athens (Greece), Oval Staircase, Megaron – the Athens Concert Hall, “All the In-Between Spaces”, Concept and direction by: Paolo Thorsen-Nagel. Katalin Ladik: “Follow me into mythology” /performance/
- Budapest (Hungary), Urania National Film Theatre, Janus Pannonius Grand Prize for Poetry 2017 Festivities of Hungarian Pen Club. Katalin Ladik: Sound Performance based on Concrete Poems of Augusto de Campos
- Limassol (Cyprus), Theatro Ena, SARDAM Mixed-media Literary Festival 5th edition, „Live Lecture” /solo sound poetry performance/
- Nicosia (Cyprus), Artos Foundation, SARDAM Mixed-media Literary Festival 5th edition „Live Lecture” /solo sound poetry performance/
- Limassol (Cyprus), SARDAM Mixed-media Literary Festival 5th edition, "Spring Cleaning", performance/
- Limassol (Cyprus), SARDAM Mixed-media Literary Festival 5th edition, „Wall(ed)”, aRttitude Site-specific dance performance, Katalin Ladik (live sound and voice).
- Budapest (Hungary), Trafó, „Alice in Codeland” /multimedia performance/
- Vienna (Austria), Lobby of Hotel Prinz Eugen, Erste Bank Publication Presentation „Sound Poems” /live performance/
- Novi Sad (Serbia), Museum of Contemporary Art Voivodina (MSUV), „K.A.T (Culture – Activism – Theory) Conference”, „Creative Transitions”/live lecture, multimedia and sound poetry performance/
- Novi Sad (Serbia), Bulevar Books, „TraNSporteur multilingual poetry” /poetry reading/
- Lodz (Poland), House of Literature, „Puls Literary Festival, 2017, Hungarian Day”, „Sounds in Lodz” / live lecture, multimedia performance and live sound poetry performance/

2018

- Berlin (Germany), neue Gesellschaft für bildende Kunst (nBgK), "Alice in Codeland", multimedia performance
- Berlin (Germany), Akademie der Künste, „Underground und Improvisation”, „Follow me into Mythology” /live lecture and soloperformance/
- Berlin (Germany), Akademie der Künste, „Underground und Improvisation”, „Desire of Touch” /Duoperformance with Natalia Pschenitschnikova/
- Budapest (Hungary), Mersz Klub, „Túlélni a documenta 14-et” (Surviving documenta 14) /live lecture and soloperformance/
- Budapest (Hungary), Hungarian University of Fine Arts, „Túlélni a documenta 14-et” (Surviving documenta 14) /live lecture with Emese Kürti/
- Budapest (Hungary), Közkincs Könyvtár, "MŰVÉSZ + NŐ" (ARTIST + WOMAN), „Feminizmus és művészet ma?” (Feminism and Art Today?), „Túlélni a documenta 14-et” (Surviving documenta 14) /live lecture/
- Belgrade (Serbia), Cultural Center of Belgrade, "Spoken Word, World Poetry Day" /poetry reading/
- Belgrade (Serbia), Cultural Center of Belgrade, "Spoken Word, World Poetry Day", "Alice in Codeland" /multimedia performance/
- Zagreb (Croatia), „Showroom of Contemporary Sound”, „Transitions” /live lecture/
- Rome (Italy), Falconieri Palace (Hungarian Academy in Rome), „Fountains of Rome - Mouth to Lung!” /live lecture and sound performance/
- Budapest (Hungary), Három Holló – Drei Raben, „Antracit szájrúd (Antracit mouthpiece) /sound poetry performance/
- Berlin (Germany), Akademie der Künste, "19. poesiefestival berlin 2018, Weltklang – Night of Poetry", sound poetry performance
- Berlin (Germany), German Centre for Poetry (Haus f’ür Poesie), "lyrikline - Listen to the Poet", poetry reading and live voice recordings for the archive

2019

- Basel (Switzerland), Music Academy of Basel, Master Class in Free Impovisation, „Homo Ludens” (live lecture)
- Dresden (Germany), Lipsiusbau, „Alice in Codeland” / performance
- Rotterdam (the Netherlands), DE PLAYER, in collaboration with KRAAK, „BRAUBLFF #8 (Materie und Laut), Memory of Water / sound installation and sound poetry performance
- Brussels (Belgium), DE PLAYER, in collaboration with KRAAK, „BRAUBLFF #8 (Materie und Laut), „Memory of Water” / sound installation and sound poetry performance
- Madrid (Spain), Elba Benitez Gallery, „O-PUS” (solo exhibition curated by Adam Budak) / sound poetry performance
- Paris (France), Palais de Tokyo, The Liberated Voice, Sound Poetry, „Memory of Water” /sound installation

=== 2020s ===
2020

- London (UK), Café OTO, Tinted Window with issue No.2: Verbivocovisual dedicated to 'Materializzazione del Linguaggio', a 1978 Venice Biennale exhibition curated by Mirella Bentivoglio/ sound installation (Memory of Water) and performance (Tranzit Zoon)
- Budapest (Hungary), Trafo Gallery, Nyitott műterem #21 (Open Studio), Zoom conversation with Emese Kürti
- Budapest (Hungary), acb Attachments, „Szerelmem, Sing-her!” (My Love, Sing-her!). Opening of solo exhibition „Sewn Sounds” (Bevarrt hangok)

2021

- Veszprém (Hungary), Pannon Várszínház (Pannon Castle Theatre), „Alice Kódországban” (Alice in Codeland)/ performance
- Budapest (Hungary), Art9 Gallery, „Új szakralitás” (New sacrality) / sound poetry performance
- Budapest (Hungary), MAMŰ, Opening of the exhibition „Graphic Score” /sound poetry performance
- Budapest (Hungary), Kassák Múzeum, „A víz emlékezete” („The Memory of Water”), Finissage of the exhibition „Poetry & Performance - Performance Art in Eastern Europe” /sound installation

2022

- Budapest (Hungary), Godot Gallery, opening of the exhibition of drMáriás / sound poetry performance
- Vienna (Austria), Alte Schmiede, „akustische Poesie” („Acoustic poetry”) / sound poetry performance
- Bratislava (Slovakia), Slovak National Gallery, „Follow me into mythology” / sound poetry performance and live lecture
- Budapest (Hungary), Kassák Múzeum, „Szkárosi-emlékest” (Memorial evening), „Gyaloghíddal a csillaglejtőn” (Footbridge over the stargate )/sound poetry
- Berlin (Germany), Collegium Hungaricum, „The Poets’ Sounds” / sound poetry performance
- Cologne (Germany), Loft, „The Poets’ Sounds” / sound poetry performance
- London (UK), London Woolwich Works, LCMF (London Contemporary Music Festival) “Sad and Ruined” /sound poetry performance
- Belgrade (Serbia), „The Poets’ Sounds” / sound poetry performance
- Limassol (Cyprus), Art Studio 55, SARDAM-Literature Festival, sound poetry and „Tranzit Zoon” performance

== Workshops with performances (selection) ==
2018

- Zagreb (Croatia), „Showroom of Contemporary Sound”, „Noćna pjesma morskih ježeva” („Night song of sea lizards”) /improvisation and sounding in visual and concrete poetry workshop for the students of the Department of Animation and New Media of the Fine Art Academy in Zagreb (OZAFIN), as a part of the project Re-Imagine Europe, co-funded by the Creative Europe programme of the European Union/

2021

- Berlin (Germany), Lettrétage im ACUD Studio, Poets’ Sound Production Workshop 1, creation of the visual score „Drei Eier”
- Cologne (Germany), LOFT Cologne, Poets’ Sound Production Workshop 2, finalizing the visual score „Drei Eier”
- Berlin (Germany), Collegium Hungaricum Berlin, Poets’ Sound Production Workshop 3, rehearsal of the visual score based performance „Drei Eier”

== Concerts, musical performances (selection) ==
1969

- Opatija (Croatia): Jugoslovenska muzička tribina (Yugoslav Music Tribune) (Ernő Király: Refleksija)

1970

- Opatija (Croatia): Jugoslovenska muzička tribina (Yugoslav Music Tribune) (Ernő Király: Refleksija; Branimir Sakač: Bellatrix - Alleluja)
- Novi Sad (Serbia): Muzika i Laboratorija (Music and Laboratory) (with Ernő Király)
- Osijek (Croatia): Annale komorne opere i baleta (Annual festival of chamber opera and ballet)

1971

- Zagreb (Croatia): Muzički biennale (Music Biennale – International Festival of Contemporary Music) (MBZ Radionica/Workshop II with Ernő Király, et al.; Chamber Music - Branimir Sakač: Bellatrix - Alleluja)
- Dubrovnik (Croatia): Dubrovačke ljetne igre (Dubrovnik Summer Festival) (ACEZANTEZ Ensemble)
- Radenci (Slovenia): Festival sodobne komorne glazbe (Contemporary Chamber Music Festival)

1972

- Munich (Germany): (Cultural Program of the 1972 Summer Olympics) (ACEZANTEZ Ensemble)
- Radenci (Slovenia): Festival sodobne komorne glazbe (ACEZANTEZ Ensemble) (Contemporary Chamber Music Festival)
- Osijek (Croatia): Annale komorne opere i baleta (ACEZANTEZ Ensemble) (Annual festival of chamber opera and ballet)
- Novi Sad (Serbia), ‘Radivoj Ćirpanov’ Workers’ University / Radnički univerzitet ‘Radivoj Ćirpanov’ (ACEZANTEZ Ensemble)
- Belgrade (Serbia), Studentski kulturni centar (Student Cultural Centre) – Festival Expanded Media (ACEZANTEZ Ensemble)

1979-2012

- Belgrade (Serbia), Dom Sindikata – BEMUS Belgrade Music Festival: “Oratorio Profano” (composer: Dušan Radić, conductor: Oskar Danon)
- Opatija (Croatia): Jugoslovenska muzička tribina (Yugoslav Music Tribune)
- Budapest (Hungary), Spiritus Noister Group, 1996, 2002, 2004, 2007, 2008, 2009, 2010, 2011, 2012
- Budapest (Hungary), Italian Cultural Institute / Olasz kultúrintézet / Istituto Italiano di Cultura, Avantgárd művészetek a világban: mi lett a sorsuk? Nemzetközi tanácskozás (Avant-garde Arts in the World: What About Them? International conference): "Futurdadama (Futurdada Today)", Spiritus Noister, 2001
- Vienna (Austria), Spiritus Noister Group, 2004
- Szentendre (Hungary), Spiritus Noister Group, 2009
- Szekszárd (Hungary), Spiritus Noister Group, 2012

2016

- Budapest (Hungary), Művelődési Szint (MÜSZI), „@Transart Communication 2016”, „Alchimist Wedding” /concert and live sound performance with Zsolt Sőrés/
- Veszprém (Hungary), House of Arts, „Alkímiai mennyegző” („Alchimist Wedding”) /concert and live sound performance with Zsolt Sőrés/
- Budapest (Hungary), Müpa, UH Fest, Spiritus Noister /concert and live sound performance with Endre Szkárosi, Zsolt Sőrés, László Lenkes/
- Budapest (Hungary), Kassak Museum, „Dadarabok” /concert and live sound performance with Endre Szkárosi, Zsolt Sőrés, László Lenkes/

2017

- Budapest (Hungary), 2017: Muted and silent films with live music series, I Belong To The Band vs. Berberian Sound Studio

2018

- Debrecen (Hungary), MODEM, Katalin Ladik: „Határidőnapló” („Diary Book”) /concert and live sound performance with Gyula Várnai/
- Veszprém (Hungary), 2018, House of Arts, „Spring Reopening, We believe in life before death”, „Claes Oldenburg: I am for an Art” /concert and live sound performance with Gyula Várnai/
- Basel (Switzerland), IGNM, Ackermannshof, Free Improvisation based on graphic scores of Ernő Király and Katalin Ladik
- Budapest (Hungary), FUGA Centre for Architecture, Design Week, Attila Dóra (bass clarinate), Katalin Ladik (vocal)
- Budapest (Hungary), Budapest Music Center (BMC), Wortlaute II, Transparent Sound New Music Festival, Ladik Katalin, „Ha múlna e láng”

2019 • Belgrade (Serbia), artist in residence at the Radio Beograd Electronic Studio, Katalin Ladik and Svetlana Maraš have created three new pieces (Electric Bird, White Bird and Ice Bird)

== Speech-music performances ==
Author

- „Drei Eier” (German, Serbian, Hungarian), presented by Sprechbohrer (Sigrid Sachse, Harald Muenz and Georg Sachse), „Drei Eier” (German, Serbian, Hungarian)

== Theatre ==
=== As an actress ===
- Jean-Paul Sartre: The Condemned of Altona; dir. István Lányi; Ifjúsági Tribün (Tribina Mladih / Youth Tribune); Novi Sad (Serbia); 1963
- Imre Sarkadi: Elveszett Paradicsom (Paradise Lost); dir. Tibor Gellér; Petőfi Sándor Művelődési Egyesület (’Petőfi Sándor’ Cultural Association); Novi Sad (Serbia); 1963
- Molière: The Imaginary Invalid (Béline); dir. Ljubica Ravasi; Srpsko Narodno Pozorište (Serbian National Theatre); Novi Sad (Serbia); 1966 (Exam Piece)
- Sándor Guelmino: Özvegy (Widow); dir. Tibor Vajda; Echo (az Újvidéki Rádió és az Ifjúsági Tribün színpada / the joint theatre of Radio Novi Sad and the Youth Tribune); Novi Sad (Serbia); 1969
- Ferenc Tóth (text) – Ernő Király (composer): Jób (Job) (Performer – Recitative); dir. István Szabó Jr.; Népszínház / Narodno Pozorište u Subotici (National Theatre in Subotica); Subotica (Serbia); 1972
- István Örkény: Macskajáték (Cats' Play) (Ilus); dir. Tibor Vajda; Újvidéki Színház (Novi Sad Theatre); (Serbia); 1974
- Peter Weiss: How Mr. Mockinpott was cured of his Sufferings (First Angel/First Nurse); dir. Radoslav Dorić; Róbert Bambach; Újvidéki Színház (Novi Sad Theatre); (Serbia); 1974
- Ödön von Horváth: Tales from the Vienna Woods (Emma); dir. Róbert Bambach; Újvidéki Színház (Novi Sad Theatre); (Serbia); 1975
- Gergely Csiky: Mukányi (Ella); dir. Mihály Virág; Újvidéki Színház (Novi Sad Theatre); (Serbia); 1976
- Valentin Kataev: Squaring the Circle (Tanya); dir. Tibor Vajda; Újvidéki Színház (Novi Sad Theatre); (Serbia); 1977
- Molière: Dom Juan or The Feast with the Statue (Mathurine); dir. Dušan Sabo; Újvidéki Színház (Novi Sad Theatre); (Serbia); 1978
- Anton Pavlovich Chekhov: Three Sisters (Masha); dir. György Harag; Újvidéki Színház (Novi Sad Theatre); (Serbia); 1978
- Ödön von Horváth: Tales from the Vienna Woods (Emma); dir. Péter Telihay; Újvidéki Színház (Novi Sad Theatre); (Serbia); 1978
- Anton Pavlovich Chekhov: The Cherry Orchard (Charlotta Ivanovna); dir. György Harag; Újvidéki Színház (Novi Sad Theatre); (Serbia); 1979
- Ottó Tolnai: Végeladás (Clearance Sale) (Mrs Csömöre); dir. Mihály Virág; Újvidéki Színház (Novi Sad Theatre); (Serbia); 1979
- Gyula Hernádi: V.N.H.M. Szörnyek évadja (V. N. H. M. - Season of Monsters); dir. Miklós Jancsó; Summer Theatre in Gyula; Várszínház; (Hungary); 1980
- Edward Albee: Everything in the Garden (Cynthia); dir. Tibor Vajda; Újvidéki Színház (Novi Sad Theatre); (Serbia); 1980
- Angelo Beolco (Il Ruzzante): La Betia; dir. Radoslav Dorić; Újvidéki Színház (Novi Sad Theatre); (Serbia); 1981
- Ottó Tolnai: Bayer Aspirin (The Actress); dir. Miklós Jancsó; Újvidéki Színház (Novi Sad Theatre); (Serbia); 1981
- Ferenc Deák: Nirvana (Csontos Vali); dir. István Szabó Jr.; Újvidéki Színház (Novi Sad Theatre); (Serbia); 1981
- Bertolt Brecht: Baal (Emilie); dir. Milan Belegišanin; Újvidéki Színház (Novi Sad Theatre); (Serbia); 1983
- Dezső Kosztolányi: Anna Édes ( Mrs Druma); dir. György Harag; Újvidéki Színház (Novi Sad Theatre); (Serbia); 1983
- Alexander Vvedensky: Jelka kod Ivanovih (Christmas at the Ivanov’s) (Mother Puzirjova); dir. Haris Pašović; Akademsko Pozorište “Promena” (“Change” Academic Theater); Novi Sad; (Serbia); 1983
- Mihály Majtényi: Harmadik ablak (The Third Window) (Mrs Lódi); dir. György Hernyák; Újvidéki Színház (Novi Sad Theatre); (Serbia); 1984
- Alfred Jarry: Ubu Roi (Mama Ubu); dir. Tibor Csizmadia; Újvidéki Színház (Novi Sad Theatre); (Serbia); 1984
- Gyula Gobby Fehér: A Duna menti Hollywood (Hollywood by the Danube) – Multimedia Performance About the Life of Ernő Bosnyák (The Baron's Lover); dir. Károly Vicsek; Újvidéki Színház (Novi Sad Theatre); (Serbia); 1985
- Ivo Brešan: Anera (Anera); dir. Dimitar Stankoski; Újvidéki Színház (Novi Sad Theatre); (Serbia); 1985
- Peter Shaffer: Equus (Hesther Salamon); dir. Tibor Vajda; Újvidéki Színház (Novi Sad Theatre); (Serbia); 1985
- Howard Barker: The Castle (Skinner); dir. David Gothard; Népszínház / Narodno Pozorište u Subotici (National Theatre in Subotica); (Serbia); 1986
- Friedrich Dürrenmatt: The Visit (First Woman); dir. Radoslav Dorić; Újvidéki Színház (Novi Sad Theatre); (Serbia); 1986
- István Örkény: Forgatókönyv (Screenplay) (Mrs Littke); dir. Ljubisa Georgievski; Újvidéki Színház (Novi Sad Theatre); (Serbia); 1986
- István Örkény: Tóték (The Tót Family) (Mrs Tót); dir. Gábor Székely; Újvidéki Színház (Novi Sad Theatre); (Serbia); 1987
- Edward Albee: A Delicate Balance (Julia); dir. Mihály Virág; Újvidéki Színház (Novi Sad Theatre); (Serbia); 1987
- Jordan Plevnes: „R” (Katerina); dir. Ljubisa Georgievski; Újvidéki Színház (Novi Sad Theatre); (Serbia); 1987
- Johann Wolfgang von Goethe: Clavigo (Soffe); dir. Vladimir Milcin; Újvidéki Színház (Novi Sad Theatre); (Serbia); 1988
- Samuel Beckett: Happy Days (Winnie); dir. Radoslav Lazić; Újvidéki Színház (Novi Sad Theatre); (Serbia); 1988
- Henrik Ibsen: An Enemy of the People (Mrs Stockmann); dir. Želimir Orešković; Újvidéki Színház (Novi Sad Theatre); (Serbia); 1989
- Ferenc Molnár (Franz Molnar): Liliom (Mrs Muskát); dir. László Babarczy; Újvidéki Színház (Novi Sad Theatre); (Serbia); 1990
- Ede Tóth: A falu rossza, avagy a negyedik ablak (The Village Rogue; Or, the Fourth Window) (Mrs Tarisznyás); dir. Hernyák György; Újvidéki Színház (Novi Sad Theatre); (Serbia); 1990
- Ottó Tolnai: Paripacitrom (lit. Steed dung) (Krisztina); dir. Péter Tömöry; Újvidéki Színház (Novi Sad Theatre); (Serbia); 1991
- Marcel Achard: L'Idiote (A Shot in the Dark) (Chief Inspector's Wife); dir. Tibor Vajda; Újvidéki Színház (Novi Sad Theatre); (Serbia); 1991
- Bertolt Brecht: Mother Courage and Her Children (Mother Courage); dir. Lajos Soltis; Újvidéki Színház (Novi Sad Theatre); (Serbia); 1991
- Józsi Jenő Tersánszky: Kakuk Marci (Her Ladyship); dir. Lajos Soltis; Újvidéki Színház (Novi Sad Theatre); (Serbia); 1992
- Jean Anouilh: The Orchestra (Cello); dir. Voja Soldatović; Újvidéki Színház (Novi Sad Theatre); (Serbia); 1992
- Péter Nádas (text) – László Vidovszky (composer): Találkozás (Encounter) (Mária); dir. András Éry-Kovács; Shure Studio; Budapesti Kamaraszínház (Chamber Theatre in Budapest); (Hungary); 1997
- Boris Vian: Vercoquin et le Plancton (Vercoquin and the Plankton) (Léon Charles Miqueut sous-ingénieur principal di CNU / Sub head-engineer at CNU); dir. Róbert Csontos; Kolibri Színház (Kolibri [’Hummingbird’] Theatre); Budapest (Hungary); 1997
- Sean O´Casey: Bedtime Story (Landlady); dir. Pál Kanda; Függeten Színpad III társulata (3rd Company of Independent Theatre); Kolibri Pince (Kolibri [’Hummingbird’] Cellar Theatre); Budapest (Hungary); 1998
- László Najmányi: Adieu Monsieur Bloom – Cabaret Noire (Nora Barnacle); dir. László Najmányi; Les Fleurs du Mal; "The Thinking Man's Living Theatre"; Mu Színház (Mu Theatre); Budapest; (Hungary); 2003
- László Najmányi: A száműzött Joyce / The Exiled Joyce (Nora Barnacle); dir. László Najmányi; Bloomsday Festival; Szombathely; (Hungary); 2003
- Radoslav Zlatan Dorić: Ne daj Bože, da se Srbi slože / Ne adj isten, szerbek egyesülnek (God Forbid That the Serbs Should Agree) (Ruska); dir. Radoslav Zlatan Dorić; Magyarországi Szerb Színház / Srpsko Pozorište u Mađarskoj (Serbian Theatre of Hungary); Budapest; (Hungary); 2004
- László Najmányi: Nova Necropola. Cabaret Noire (Nora Barnacle); dir. László Najmányi; Mu Színház (Mu Theatre); Budapest; (Hungary); 2004
- László Najmányi: Az igazi Blum (The Real Blum /Bloom/) (Nora Barnacle); dir. László Najmányi; ReJoyce Festival; Szombathely; (Hungary); 2004
- György Baráthy: Origami (I Woman); dir. György Baráthy; Artéria Színházi Társaság (Theatre Company “Artéria”); RS9 Studio Theatre; Budapest; (Hungary); 2005
- Torkolat/Estuary (Unborn child), dir: Al Farman Petra (Freeszfe), Freeszemle, Király fürdő, Budapest (Hungary), 2022
- Szabadkai szecesszió/Art Nouveau in Subotica based on George Tabori's My Mother's Courage (Mother), dir: Zlatko Paković, Kosztolányi Dezső Színház. Subotica, 2021

=== As a director ===
- The Last Chapter by Navjot Randhawa, performed by the‘Theatre of Roots and Wings’ and Punjab Sangeet Natak Akademi in Punjabi at the Randhawa Auditorium, Chandigarh (Punjab, India); 2014.
- Everything She Wants: Amrita and Boris by Navjot Randhawa and Jim Sarbh, Gaiety Theatre, Shimla, India; 2016, The Mirage Yoga Studio, Andretta Arts, Andretta, India, 2016; M.L. Bhartia Auditorium, Alliance Francaise, New Delhi, India, 2016; Punjab Kala Bhawan, Chandigarh, India, 2016; Punjab Naatshala (Punjab Theatre), Amritsar, India, 2016
- Everything She Wants: Amrita and Boris with Navjot Randhawa;
  - Sher-Gil Cultural Centre, Indian Embassy, Budapest (Hungary), 2017
  - Fritz Wine House, Szekszárd (Hungary), 2017;
  - National Film Theatre, Budapest (Hungary), 2017;
  - Laffert Kúria, Dunaharaszti (Hungary), 2017;
  - Municipal Library, Zebegény (Hungary), 2017.

== Films ==
=== Feature films ===
- Eduard i Kunigunda (Eduard and Kunigunda) (television adaptation of Renato de Grandis’ musical play), dir. Petar Teslić (1972, Serbian, Belgrade TV 2) (Kunigunda)
- Dübörgő csend (1978) at IMDb (Thundering Silence), dir. Miklós Szíjj (Hungarian) (Eta)
- Szetna, a varázsló (1980) at IMDb (Setna the Wizard), dir. András Rajnai (Hungarian) (Isis)
- Gulliver az óriások országában (1980) at IMDb (Gulliver in the Land of Giants), dir. András Rajnai (Hungarian) (Lady in attendance)
- Aelita, dir. András Rajnai (1980, Hungarian)
- Atlantis, dir. András Rajnai (1980, Hungarian) (The Lady of Atlantis)
- Chekhov: The Cherry Orchard (televised theatrical performance), dir. György Harag (1982, Hungarian, produced in Yugoslavia, Novi Sad Television) (Charlotta Ivanovna)
- Chekhov: Three Sisters (televised theatrical performance), dir. György Harag (1982, Hungarian, produced in Yugoslavia, Novi Sad Television) (Masha)
- A világkagyló mítosza (The Myth of the World Shell), dir. András Rajnai (1982, Hungarian)
- Bábel tornya (The Tower of Babel), dir. András Rajnai (1982, Hungarian) (the Priestess Lagasa)
- Héroszok pokoljárása (The Heroes’ Journey Through the Underworld), dir. András Rajnai (1982, Hungarian) (Anna)
- Fajkutyák ideje (lit. The Time of Purebred Dogs), dir. Károly Vicsek (1984, Hungarian, produced in Yugoslavia)
- Ujed andjela (1984) at IMDb (Angel's Bite), dir. Lordan Zafranović (Croatian) (Žena)
- Késdobáló (slang: Pub, lit. Knife-thrower), dir. Károly Vicsek (1984, Yugoslavian - Hungarian)
- Ekran sneži (1985) at IMDb, dir. Miljenko Dereta (Serbian)
- Napóleon (1989) at IMDb (Napoleon), dir. András Sólyom (Hungarian) (Leticia)
- Granica (1990) at IMDb (Border), dir. Zoran Maširević (Yugoslavian – Serbian – Hungarian)
- Sex-partijski neprijatelj br. 1 (1990) at IMDb (Sex, the Nr 1 Enemy of the Party), dir. Dušan Sabo (Bosnian) (Žuža)
- A nagy fejedelem (1997) at IMDb (The Great Prince), dir. Mária Sós (Hungarian) (The scientist’s wife)
- A szivárvány harcosa (2001) at IMDb (Rainbow's Warrior), dir. Péter Havas (Hungarian) (Old Ms Sofia - voice)
- Kolorádó Kid,(2010) at IMDb, dir. András Vágvölgyi B. (Hungarian)
- Berberian Sound Studio,(2012) at IMDb, dir. Peter Strickland (English) (Resurrected Witch)

=== Short films ===
- Castrati, dir. Domokos Moldován (1972, Hungarian, Balázs Béla Studio, Budapest) (Bald Medium)
- O-Pus, dir. Attila Csernik (1973) (with Katalin Ladik’s Sound Project)
- Csendélet hallal és más tragikus momentumokkal (2005) at IMDb (Still Life with Fish and Other Tragic Elements), dir. Natália Jánossy (Hungarian) (Agáta)
- Deda Kovač - Grandpa Kovač (2011) at IMDb, dir. Milica Đjenić (Serbian, Beograd-Lajpcig Express) (Rozi)

=== Recitatives ===
- Ahol kialszik a világ (1989) at IMDb (Where the World Goes Out) (based on Kalandozás a tükörben (Adventures in the Mirror) by János Pilinszky), dir. Károly Kismányoky (1989, Hungarian, Pannonia Film Studio)
- A párduc (The Panther), (Short animated film set to Rilke’s poem), dir. András Fiath (1998, Hungarian)
- Medea (animated study), dir. Zsófia Péterffy (2007)
- Örökre való / For Ever, dir. Katalin Riedl (2008–2010)

=== Television interviews ===
2018

- Radio-Television of Vojvodina (Novi Sad): Katalin Ladik Winner of the LennonOno Grant for Peace

2019

- Hungarian broadcast (Romanian Television, Bucharest): A taste of the Balkans - a conversation with poet Katalin Ladik

=== Documentary ===
- Tanuljunk magyarul (Let's Learn Hungarian), dir. Károly Vicsek (1979, Serbian - Hungarian, Novi Sad Television), (language teaching series)
- Katalin Ladik - Bogdanka Poznanović (1980, Serbian-Hungarian, Akademija Umetnosti Novi Sad – Novi Sad Art Academy), (Documentary about Katalin Ladik)
- Monodráma születik (A Monodrama is Born), dir. Gyula Radó (1981, Hungarian, Szegedi TV), (Documentary about Katalin Ladik)
- Ez már nem én vagyok (This Isn't Me Anymore), dir. Gyula Radó (1982, Hungarian, Szegedi TV), (Documentary about Katalin Ladik)
- Krleža u videomedijima 5.: TV-usporedbe Adam i Eva (Krleža in Video-Medium 5: TV Comparisons of Adam i Eva), dir. Mario Fanelli, (1984, Croatian, TV Zagreb), (performer, Eva), (documentary series)
- Bukott angyal (Fallen Angel), dir. Jenő Hartyándi (1992, Hungarian - Serbian, Mediawave) (performance-recording)
- Valahol Közép-Európában (Somewhere in Central Europe), dir. István Grencsó, Jenő Hartyándi (1993, Hungarian – Serbian) (Documentary)
- Amarissima: Katalin Ladik i novosadska umetnička scena sedamdesetih (Amarissima: Katalin Ladik and the Novi Sad Artistic Scene in the Seventies), dir. Milica Mrđa-Kuzmanov (1999, Serbian), (Documentary about Katalin Ladik's art)
- Százféle szerelem (A Hundred Kinds of Love) (2002, Hungarian), (the poems of Éva Saáry are read by Katalin Ladik), (Documentary about Éva Saáry)
- A sikoly ars poétikája - Ladik Katalin portréfilm (The Ars Poetica of the Scream – Katalin Ladik's Portrait), dir. Kornél Szilágyi, (2012, Hungarian) (Documentary about Katalin Ladik)
- (trailer) Sound Cage: A Portrait of Katalin Ladik, dir. Kornél Szilágyi (Igor Buharov), (2012, Hungarian with English subtitles) (Documentary about Katalin Ladik)
- A legismertebb magyar, dir. Gábor Tóth, HírTV (Documentary about Amrita Sher-Gil and the play Everything She Wants directed by Katalin Ladik and performed by Navjot Randhawa at the Indian Embassy, Budapest (2017)

=== Writer’s Credit ===
- Sámán (Shaman), dir. Pál Zolnay (1977, Hungarian, written by the director using poems of Attila József, László Nagy, Sándor Weöres és Katalin Ladik)
- Behind the Eye, dir. Sebő Kovács (1999, Hungarian, based on Katalin Ladik's poem: Vers a szerelmes piócáról / The Poem of the Leech in Love)

== Radio plays ==
=== Writer and performer ===
- Furcsa, aki darazsakról álmodik (Strange Is the One Who Is Dreaming About Wasps), 1982, Magyar Rádió Budapest (Hungarian Radio). Alex Avanesian, Imre József Katona and Katalin Ladik.
- Furcsa, aki darazsakról álmodik (Strange Is the One Who Is Dreaming About Wasps), 1985, Radio Novi Sad (Serbia). Tibor Vajda and Katalin Ladik.
- Bukott angyalok (Fallen Angels), 1992, Radio Novi Sad (Serbia). Tibor Vajda.
- Fűketrec (Grass-Cage), 2002, Radio Novi Sad. Tibor Vajda and Katalin Ladik.
- Tesla Project, 2003, Radio Novi Sad (Serbia). Tibor Vajda.
- Élhetek az arcodon? (Can I Live on Your Face?), 2012, Hungarian Radio, script by Otília Cseicsner, directed by Kornél Szilágyi
- A víz emlékezete (The Memory of Water), Rádiószínház, Hungarian Radio (Kossuth Rádió), directed by Otília Cseicsner, 27 June 2017, 21:30
- Radio Theatre: „Ladik Katalin: Hide-and-Seek, Variations of The Old Hungarian Lamentations of Mary” (Bujócska, Ómagyar Márai-siralom variációk), Magyar Rádió (Hungarian Radio), Kossuth Rádió, radio program editor: Otilia Cseicsner

=== Performer ===
- Bertolt Brecht: Az árja-kaszt magánélete (The Private Life of the Master Race; alt. title for Fear and Misery of the Third Reich) (Woman), dir. Tibor Gellér, Radio Novi Sad (Serbia), 1963
- Miodrag Djurdjević: A csavargó meg ők ketten (The Vagabond and the Two of Them) (the Girl), dir. István Varga, Radio Novi Sad (Serbia), 1963
- Miklós Gyárfás: Kisasszonyok a magasban – Férfiaknak tilos (Young Ladies Up High – No Men Allowed) (Júlia, who is barely even a young lady), dir. Tibor Gellér, Radio Novi Sad (Serbia), 1964
- Lászó Kopeczky: Harangszó előtt (Before the Bell Rings) (Flóra), dir. István Varga, Radio Novi Sad (Serbia), 1964
- Leon Kruczkowski: A kormányzó halála (Death of the Governor) (Silvia), (adapted by Iván Horovitz), dir. István Varga, Radio Novi Sad (Serbia), 1964
- Mikhail Tonecki: Találka a „Mese” kávéházban (A Date in Café Tale) (Waitress), dir. Tibor Gellér, Radio Novi Sad (Serbia), 1964
- János Herceg: Mindenkinek van egy álma (Everyone Has a Dream) (performer), dir. Tibor Gellér, Radio Novi Sad (Serbia), 1965
- Aleksandar Obrenović: A tegnapi nap (Yesterday) (performer), dir. István Varga, Radio Novi Sad (Serbia), 1966
- Erskine Caldwell: Asszonyi sorsok (This Very Earth) (Vicky), (adapted by Jasmina Egrić), dir. Tibor Gellér, Radio Novi Sad (Serbia), 1966
- Miroslav Mitrović: Még szemerkél az eső (The Rain Is Still Dripping) (Announcer), dir. Gellér Tibor, Radio Novi Sad (Serbia), 1966
- Momo Kapor: III. Olivér teremőre (The Guard of Oliver III) (performer), dir. Tibor Gellér, Radio Novi Sad (Serbia), 1966
- Dušan Raksandić: Muratról, Pepekről, Angyeláról és rólam (About Murat, Pepek, Andjela and Me) (the Professor's Wife), dir. Tibor Gellér, Radio Novi Sad (Serbia), 1967
- Günter Eich: Carmilla meg én (The Other and I; orig. Die Andere und Ich) (performer), dir. László Szilágyi, Radio Novi Sad (Serbia), 1967
- Marguerite Duras: Andesmas úr délutánja (The Afternoon of Mr Andesmas) (Valérie), (adapted by Milan Topolavčki) dir. László Szilágyi, Radio Novi Sad (Serbia), 1967
- Miloslav Stehlík: Bizalomvonal (Helpline) (Telephone Assistant), dir. István Varga, Radio Novi Sad (Serbia), 1967
- Sead Fetahagić: Körbe, körbe, karikába (Round and Round) (Mira), dir. István Varga, Radio Novi Sad (Serbia), 1967
- Alessandro De Stefani: Csónak jön a tavon (A Boat Approaches on the Lake – Una barca viene dal lago) (Anna Marabini), (adapted by Iván Horovitz) dir. László Szilágyi, Radio Novi Sad (Serbia), 1968
- Michal Tonecki: Az ötödik (The Fifth) (a Lány szerepében), dir. Gusztáv Barlay, Radio Novi Sad (Serbia), 1968
- József Sulhóf (text), ed. by Ernő Király: Tavaszi bokréta dalest (Spring Bouquet – An Evening of Songs) (Announcer), Radio Novi Sad (Serbia), 1968
- Magda Szabó: A rab (The Prisoner) (Zsuzsanna Kazinczy), dir. Frigyes Marton, Radio Novi Sad (Serbia), 1968
- Aldo Nicolai: Éljen az ifjú pár! (Long Live the Newlyweds!) (Woman), dir. Tibor Vajda, Radio Novi Sad (Serbia), 1969
- Ferenc Deák: Apoteózis (Apotheosis) (Recitative) (performer), dir. Tibor Vajda, Radio Novi Sad (Serbia), 1969
- Boris Palotai: Öröklakás (Condominium) (Klára), dir. László Szilágyi, Radio Novi Sad (Serbia), 1969
- Endre Fejes: Vigyori (Grinner) (Girl), dir. István Varga, Radio Novi Sad (Serbia), 1970
- Eugène Ionesco: A kopasz énekesnő (The Bald Soprano), dir. László Szilágyi, Radio Novi Sad (Serbia), 1970
- Pál Saffer: A csend (The Silence) (Lidia), dir. Tibor Vajda, Radio Novi Sad (Serbia), 1970
- Mihály Majtényi: A száműzött (The Exile) (Sibylla), dir. István Varga, Radio Novi Sad (Serbia), 1971
- Gerich Endre Művészestje: Azért is maradok...! (An Evening with Endre Gerich: I Say I'm Staying...!) (performer) dir. László Szilágyi, Radio Novi Sad (Serbia), 1971
- Silvia Andrescu – Theodor Manescu: Ismeretlen kedvesem (My Unknown Beloved) (Girl), dir. Tibor Vajda, Radio Novi Sad (Serbia), 1971
- Aleksandr Solzhenitsyn: Gyertyaláng a szélben (Candle in the Wind) (Anni), dir. Árpád Benedek, Radio Novi Sad (Serbia), 1972
- És mi lesz tavasszal (What Will Happen in the Spring?) (comedy night) (performer), dir. Frigyes Marton, Radio Novi Sad (Serbia), 1972
- Mirjana Buljan: Jasna naplója (Jasna's Diary) (Jasna), dir. László Szilágyi, Radio Novi Sad (Serbia), 1973
- Svetislav Ruškuc: A hetvennyolcas fordulatszámú ajtó (The 78 RPM Door) (Girl), dir. István Varga, Radio Novi Sad (Serbia), 1973
- Dušan Iljić: Beutazni a földet (To Travel the World) (Szitakötő /Dragonfly/, a Girl), dir. Miklós Cserés, Dr, Radio Novi Sad (Serbia), 1976
- Társult humor éve (The Year of Associated Humour) (performer), dir. Róbert Bambach, Radio Novi Sad (Serbia), 1976
- Szellemet idézünk! (Séance!) (performer), dir. György Turián, Radio Novi Sad (Serbia), 1977
- Vidám est (A Merry Evening) (performer), dir. Sándor Sántha, Radio Novi Sad (Serbia), 1977
- István Bosnyák: Szemben a bíróval (Facing the Judge) (docudrama in 7 episodes) (Ruth), dir. István Varga, Radio Novi Sad (Serbia), 1978
- Henrik Bardijewski: Kis komédia (A Little Comedy) (Lady I), dir. István Vajda, Radio Novi Sad (Serbia), 1978
- László Nemes: Szerencseszerződés (Contract of Luck) (adapted by János Borbély) (radio play series), dir. Slobodan Majak, Radio Novi Sad (Serbia), 1985
- Ottó Tolnai: Bayer Aszpirin (Bayer Aspirin) (The Actress), dir. Orsolya Lehoczky, Hungarian Radio / Magyar Rádió (Hungary), 1997 (monodrama)
- Iris Disse: Álmodott idő – 1956 (Dreamt Time – 1956), dir. Iris Disse, Radio Kossuth / Kossuth Rádió (Hungary), 2007 (Marika, the author's alter ego)

== Artworks in permanent public and private collections ==
- Barcelona (Spain): MACBA – Museum of Contemporary Art in Barcelona / Museu d’Art Contemporani de Barcelona (18 collages: visual poetry and music scores, 1971–1978)
- Budapest (Hungary): Petőfi Literary Museum / Petőfi Irodalmi Múzeum (9 works of visual poetry – typewritten text on paper, photograph, collages of cardboard and collages of music score, 1976–1977, Aki miatt a harang szól (For Whom the Bell Rings) – In Memoriam Lajos Kassák collage, 1987)
- Belgrade (Serbia): Museum of Contemporary Art in Belgrade / (MSUB) Muzej Savremene Umetnosti, Beograd (Poemim photo, 1978)
- New York (USA): MoMA, The Museum of Modern Art (Novi Sad Project documentation, Wow Special Zagreb Issue, 1975)
- Budapest (Hungary): Ludwig Museum – Museum of Contemporary Art / Ludwig Múzeum – Kortárs Művészeti Múzeum (Photographs, Poemim series)
- Vienna (Austria): Kontakt Collection – The Art Collection of Erste Group / Kontakt – Die Kunstsammlung der Erste Group (5 items of the “Ausgewählte Volkslieder”(Selected Folk Songs) series (1973–1975); 5 other visual poetry and music scores; 12 stamps; the 48 remaining photographs of Change Art – a performance documentation 1975; two copies of the Phonopoetica SP album 1976)
- Croatia – Marinko Sudac's Private Collection (photo documentation for performances, gramophone recording, 1968–89)
- Miami (USA): Sackner Archive of Visual and Concrete Poetry (4 postcards – mail-art – and documentation, 1977–1981)
- Belgrade (Serbia): Trajković Collection (Blackshave Poem – Zagreb performance, photo document, 1978)
- Chicago (USA): School of the Art Institute of Chicago – Joan Flasch Artist's Book Collection (Poetical objects of the Urbanical Environment, 1976)

== Exhibitions ==
=== Solo exhibitions ===
1973

- Belgrade (Serbia), Student Cultural Centre Gallery / Galerija Studentskog Kulturnog Centra

1976

- Zagreb (Croatia), Photography, Film and Television Centre / Centar za fotografiju, film i televiziju: "Visual Poetry – Music Score" (visual poems, collages)
- Novi Sad (Serbia), Youth Centre – Art Gallery / Likovni Salon Tribine Mladih

1977

- Zrenjanin (Serbia), Cultural Centre / Kulturni centar: "Visual Poetry – Music Score" (visual poems, collages)
- Zagreb (Croatia), Cultural and Information Centre / Centar za Kulturu i Informacije: "Visual Poetry – Music Score" (visual poems, collages)

1979

- Budapest (Hungary), Young Artists’ Club / Fiatal Művészek Klubja: "Visual Poetry - Music Scores" (visual poems, collages)

2007

- Budapest (Hungary), Erlin Club Gallery / Erlin Klub Galéria (visual poems, collages)

2010

- Novi Sad (Serbia), Museum of Contemporary Art in Vojvodina / Muzej Savremene Umetnosti Vojvodine (MSUV): Retrospektivna Izložba 1962–2010. Moć Žene: Katalin Ladik (Retrospective Exhibition 1962–2010 The Power of a Woman: Katalin Ladik) (Curated by: Dragomir Ugren)

2011

- Székesfehérvár (Hungary), Volksbank Gallery, “Roots and Wings”, Retrospective Exhibition of Katalin Ladik 1962–2010 (Curated by Helga Rosta)

2015

- Budapest (Hungary), Labor Gallery, "Why are you waiting?" (exhibition with Zsófi Szemző) (Curated by Bea Istvánkó)

2016

- Budapest (Hungary), acb Gallery, acb NA Gallery: "The Voice of a Woman" (Curated by Emese Kürti)

2017

- Budapest (Hungary), acb Gallery, "Ladik Katalin: Genezis. Művek az athéni documentáról" (7.07.2017.- 3.08.2017) (Curated by Emese Kürti)
- Ljubjana (Slovenia), ŠKUC Gallery, "Katalin Ladik: Screaming Hole" (7. 12. 2017 - 7. 01. 2018) (Curated by Vladimir Vidmar)
- Rome (Italy), Falconieri Palace (Hungarian Academy in Rome), Memorial Room, „UrbsArt 2018 Festival” (Curated by Emese Kürti)

2018

- Budapest (Hungary), acb NA, „Éneklő ládák” (Singing Chests)

2019

- Madrid (Spain), Elba Benitez Gallery, „O-PUS”, solo exhibition (Curated by Adam Budak)
- Budapest (Hungary), acb NA, „Hommage à Király Ernő”

2023

- Munich (Germany) Haus der Kunst Ooooooooo-pus retrospective exhibition 03.03.23 — 10.09.23

=== Group exhibitions ===
1970s

1974

- Pécs (Hungary), University of Technology / Műszaki Egyetem (Group Bosch+Bosch)

1975

- Zagreb (Croatia), Student Centre Gallery / Galerija Studentskog Centra: "Eksperimenti u modernoj jugoslovenskoj umjetnosti" (Experiments in Modern Yugoslav Art)
- Belgrade (Serbia), Student Cultural Centre / Studentski Kulturni Centar: "Festival Expanded Media"
- Vienna (Austria), Academy of Fine Arts / Akademie der Bildenden Künste: "Aspekte – Gegenwärtige Kunst aus Jugoslawien" (Aspects – Contemporary Yugoslavian Art) (Group Bosch+Bosch)
- Utrecht (Netherlands), ‘t Hoogt Gallery / Galerie ‘t Hoogt: "Internationale visuele poëzie" (International Visual Poetry)
- Amsterdam (Netherlands), Van Gogh Museum: "Vizuele poëzie" (Visual Poetry)

1976

- Brussels (Belgium), Royal Academy of Art / Rijkscentrum Hoger Kunstonderwijs: "Internationale Vizuele Poëzie" (International Visual Poetry)
- Zagreb (Croatia), Gallery of Contemporary Art / Galerija Suvremene Umjetnosti (Group Bosch+Bosch)
- Mildura (Australia), The Mildura Arts Centre: "Mask Show"
- Warsaw (Poland), Contemporary Gallery / Galeria Współczesna: "Nowoczesna Sztuka Jugoslawii" (Modern Yugoslavian Art)
- Belgrade (Serbia), Salon Museum of Contemporary Art / Salon Muzeja Savremene Umetnosti (Group Bosch+Bosch)

1977

- Amsterdam (Netherlands), Stedelijk Museum: "Tekst in Geluid" (Text in Sound), "Visual Poetry - Music Scores" (visual poems, collages)
- Rotterdam (Netherlands), Academy of Arts/ Academie van Beeldende Kunsten: "Visual Poetry - Music Scores" (visual poems, collages)
- Kranj (Slovenia), Prešeren House – Gallery / Galerija v Prešernovi hiši: "westeast" (visual poems, collages)

1978

- Kassel (Germany), Kassel Regional Council / Der Magistrat der Stadt Kassel: "Subject - Art - Artificial"
- Naples (Italy), Experimental Centre of Naples / Centro Experimenta Napoli
- Škofja Loka (Slovenia): "westeast"
- Venice (Italy), La Biennale di Venezia 1978 (Venice Biennale 1978), "Materializzazione del linguaggio" (The Materialization of Language): "Visual Poetry - Music Scores" (visual poems, collages)
- Zagreb (Croatia): Gallery of Contemporary Art / Galerija Suvremene Umjetnosti: "Nova umjetnička praksa 1966-1978" (New Art Practice 1966–1978)
- Florence (Italy), Palazzo Strozzi: "6. Biennale Internationale della Grafica d’Arte" (6th International Visual Arts Biennale)
- Amsterdam (Netherlands), Rubberplatz: "Rubber"
- Würzburg (Germany), Hand Press Gallery / Handpresse Galerie: "Kunstrand-Randkunst" (Art Edge – Edge Art)
- Mantua (Italy), Casa del Mantegna: "Mantua Mail"
- Kranj (Slovenia): "westeast"
- Ljubljana (Slovenia): "westeast"
- Zagreb (Croatia): "westeast"
- Belgrade (Serbia): "westeast"

1979

- Stuttgart (Germany): "Mail Art Exhibition"
- Sydney (Australia), Wentworth Building, University of Sydney: "Art Core Meltdown"
- Alessandria (Italy), Modern Art Gallery / Galleria D’Arte Nuova: "Trans-P-Art"
- Montreal (Canada): "Mail Art"
- Recife (Brazil): "Unicap-Mail-Art Exhibition"
- Kranj (Slovenia): "westeast"
- Ljubljana (Slovenia): "westeast"
- Zagreb (Croatia): "westeast"
- Belgrade (Serbia): "westeast"

1980s

1980

- Paris (France), Georges Pompidou National Centre / Centre National Georges Pompidou: "Rencontres Internationales de poésie sonore" (International Sound Poetry Festival)
- Rennes (France), Cultural Centre / Maison de la Culture: "Rencontres Internationales de poésie sonore" (International Sound Poetry Festival)
- Le Havre (France), Cultural Centre / Maison de la Culture: "Rencontres Internationales de poésie sonore" (International Sound Poetry Festival)
- Utrecht (Netherlands), Gallery ‘t Hoogt / ‘t Hoogt Galerie: "Magyar Műhely – D’Atelier" (cultural and literary magazine "Hungarian Workshop" in Paris) (visual poems, collages)
- Kranj (Slovenia): "westeast", "Visual Poetry - Music Scores" (visual poems, collages)
- Ljubljana (Slovenia): "westeast", " Visual Poetry - Music Scores" (visual poems, collages)
- Zagreb (Croatia): "westeast", "Visual Poetry - Music Scores" (visual poems, collages)
- Belgrade (Serbia): "westeast", "Visual Poetry - Music Scores" (visual poems, collages)
- Novi Sad (Serbia), Youth Centre Gallery / Galerija Tribine Mladih: "A Képes Ifjúság jubiláris tárlata" (Képes Ifjúság Magazine's (Youth Magazine with Images) Jubilee Exhibition) (visual poems, collages)

1982

- Belgrade (Serbia), Museum of Contemporary Art / Muzej Savremene Umetnosti: "Verbo-voko-vizuelno u Jugoslaviji 1950-1980" (Yugoslavian Verbo-Voco-Visual Art 1950–1980) (visual poems, collages)
- Novoli (Italy), Poetry Laboratory / Laboratorio de Poesia: "Figura partitura" (Music Score) (visual poems, collages)
- Rome (Italy): "Mostra internationale di arte postale Montecelio" (Montecelio International Exhibition of Mail Art) (visual poems, collages)

1983

- Belgrade (Serbia), Museum of Contemporary Art / Muzej Savremene Umetnosti: "Nova umetnost u Srbiji 1970-1980" (New Serbian Art 1970–1980) (visual poems, collages)
- Zagreb (Croatia), Gallery of Contemporary Art / Galerija Suvremene Umjetnosti: "Nova umetnost u Srbiji 1970-1980" (New Serbian Art 1970–1980) (visual poems, collages)
- Pristina (Kosovo), Art Gallery / Galerija Umetnosti: "Nova umetnost u Srbiji 1970-1980" (New Serbian Art 1970–1980) (visual poems, collages)
- Rome (Italy), (Cultural Association of) Lavatoio Contumaciale: "Figura partitura" (Music Score) (visual poems, collages)
- Brescia (Italy), Community and Cultural Centre of Mompiano / Centro Socio-Culturale di Mompiano: "Figura partitura" (Music Score) (visual poems, collages)
- Mexico: "Yugoslav Movimientos de Vanguardia" (Yugoslav Avantgarde Art Movements)
- Belgrade (Serbia): "westeast", "Visual Poetry – Music Score" (visual poems, collages)

1984

- Belgrade (Serbia), Youth Centre Gallery / Galerija Doma Omladine: "Vokovizuelno" (visual poems, collages)
- Subotica (Serbia): Yugoslavia: Likovni susret (Yugoslavian Art Encounters) "Likovno stvaralaštvo 1944-1984" (Visual Arts 1944–1984) (visual poems, collages)

1985

- Ljubljana (Slovenia), Museum of Modern Art / Moderna galerija: "Međunarodna likovna zbirka Junij" (International Art Collection in June) (visual poems, collages)

1987

- Xalapa, Veracruz (Mexico), Gallery ’Ramón Alva de la Canal’ / Galeria Ramón Alva de la Canal: Segunda Bienal Internacional de Poesía Visual y Alternativa en México (Second International Biennale of Visual and Alternative Poetry in Mexico)

2000s

2005

- Stuttgart (Germany), Württemberg Art Association / Württembergischer Kunstverein: "On Difference 1 – Local Contexts - Hybrid Spaces" (Curated by: Iris Dressler and Hans D. Christ)

2006

- Otterlo (Netherlands), Kröller Müller Museum: Living Art on the Edge of Europe (Group Bosch+Bosch) (Curated by: Nathalie Zonnenberg)
- Novi Sad (Serbia), Museum of Contemporary Art in Vojvodina / Muzej Savremene Umetnosti Vojvodine: "Remek dela savremene srpske umetnosti od 1968 (Masterpieces of Serbian Contemporary Art Since 1968)" (Curated by: Slavko Timotijević)

2007

- Belgrade (Serbia), Museum of Contemporary Art / Muzej Savremene Umetnosti: "Kontakt Beograd" - Works from the Collection of Erste Bank Group (visual poems, collages) (Curated by: Walter Seidl, Jiří Ševčík, Branka Stipančić)
- Szentendre (Hungary), Szentendre Gallery / Szentendrei Képtár: "Kis magyar performance-történet" (A Brief History of Hungarian Performance Art) (photo-documentation of the performances + vinyl disc "Phonopoetica") (Curated by: István Antal)

2008

- Dunaújváros (Hungary), Institute of Contemporary Art / Kortárs Művészeti Intézet: Works from the Collection of Erste Bank Group (visual poems, collages) (Curated by: Dóra Hegyi, Franciska Zólyom)
- Karlsruhe (Germany), Baden Art Association / Badischer Kunstverein: "Why Here Is Always Somewhere Else" (Curated by: Alenka Gregorič, Antonia Majaca, Vit Havranek, the Prelom Kolektiv)
- Minneapolis (USA), Midway Contemporary Art: "Mapping of Social and Art History of Novi Sad" (Curated by: Zoran Pantelić and Kristian Lucic)

2009

- Barcelona (Spain), Museum of Contemporary Art / MACBA Museu d’Art Contemporani de Barcelona: " Temps com a Matèria" (Time as Matter) (visual poems, collages) (curated by Bartomeu Marí)
- Vienna (Austria), MUMOK – Museum of Modern Art – Ludwig Foundation / MUMOK Museum Moderner Kunst – Stiftung Ludwig: "Gender Check – Rollenbilder in der Kunst Osteuropas (Masculinity in Eastern Europe)" (photo: "The Screaming Hole", 1979) (curated by Bojana Pejić)

2010s

2010

- Warsaw (Poland), Zachęta National Gallery of Art / Zachęta Narodowa Galeria Sztuki: "Płeć? Sprawdzam! Kobiecość i męskość w sztuce Europy Wschodniej (Gender Check – Femininity and Masculinity in the Art of Eastern Europe)" (photo: "The Screaming Hole", 1979) (Curated by: Bojana Pejić)

2011

- Zagreb (Croatia), Glyptotheque / Gliptoteka HAZU: Branimir Donat i vizualna poezija (Branimir Donat and Visual Poetry) (Organized by: Marinko Sudac Collection)
- Rijeka (Croatia), Navy Yacht Galeb (Seagull) / Brod Galeb: Područje zastoja: Aktivistička umjetnost iz Kolekcije Marinko Sudac (Standstill: Activist Art from the Marinko Sudac Collection) (organized by Marinko Sudac Collection)
- Vancouver (Canada), Audain Gallery, SFU Woodward's: Kontakt: Conceptual Art From Ex-Yugoslavia (visual poems, collages) (curated by Walter Seidl and Sabine Bitter)
- Vitoria-Gasteiz (Spain), Montehermoso Cultural Centre / Centro Cultural Montehermoso: Re.Act.Feminism – A Performing Archive (curated by Bettina Knaup and Beatrice Ellen Stammer)
- Belgrade (Serbia), "Steamboat" Cultural Institute / UK (Ustanova Kulture) "Parodbrod": Kolekcija Trajković": "Konceptualna umetnost u regionu (The Trajković Collection: Conceptual Art of the Region)" (Organized by Fond Kolekcija Trajković (Trajković Collection Fund))

2012

- Gdańsk (Poland), Wyspa Institute of Art / Instytut Sztuki Wyspa: Re.Act.Feminism – A Performing Archive (Curated by: Bettina Knaup and Beatrice Ellen Stammer)
- Belgrade (Serbia), Museum of Yugoslav History / Muzej istorije Jugoslavije: Kolekcija Trajković: Lična svita (Trajković Collection: Personal Suite) (Organized by Fond Kolekcija Trajković (Trajković Collection Fund) and Muzej istorije Jugoslavije (Museum of Yugoslav History))
- Budapest (Hungary), Hungarian Writers' Association / Magyar Írószövetség: Ekszpanzió XXIV Festival "Idézet" Szimpozion és Kiállítás ("Quotation" Symposion and Exhibition) (photos) (Curated by: Rózsa Köpöczi)
- Zagreb (Croatia), Miroslav Kraljević Gallery / Galerija Miroslav Kraljević: Re.Act.Feminism – A Performing Archive (Curated by: Bettina Knaup and Beatrice Ellen Stammer)
- Łódź (Poland), MS2 – Lodz Museum of Art / MS2 – Muzeum Sztuki w Łodzi: Sounding the Body Electric. Experiments in Art and Music in Eastern Europe 1957––1984 (visual and sound poetry) (Curated by: David Crowley, Daniel Muzyczuk)
- Roskilde (Denmark), Museum of Contemporary Art / Museet for Samtidskunst: Re.Act.Feminism – A Performing Archive (Curated by: Bettina Knaup and Beatrice Ellen Stammer)
- Budapest (Hungary), Ludwig Museum / Ludwig Múzeum: A hős, a hősnő és a szerző (The Hero, the Heroine and the Author) (July 6 – October 21) (Poemim, photos) (Curated by: Katalin Timár)
- Tallinn (Estonia), Tallinn Art Hall / Tallinna Kunstihoone: Re.Act.Feminism – A Performing Archive (August 29 – September 30) (Curated by: Bettina Knaup and Beatrice Ellen Stammer)

2013

- Budapest (Hungary), Ludwig Museum, The Freedom of Sound. John Cage behind the Iron Curtain.
- Novi Sad (Serbia), Studio M, Sterija Festival 2013, Dnevna Soba / Living room (interactive installation) (Curated by: Ivana Vujić)
- London (United Kingdom), Calvert 22 Gallery. "Sounding The Body Electric: Experiments in Art and Music in Eastern Europe 1957–1984" (curated by David Crowley and Daniel Muzyczuk)

2014

- Budapest (Hungary), Ludwig Museum, “Anarchy. Utopia. Revolution” (Curated by: Katalin Timár)
- Nottingham (United Kingdom), Nottingham Contemporary, "Monuments Should Not Be Trusted" (curated by Lina Džuverović)

2015

- Budapest (Hungary), Bookmarks (Former MEO), Off Bienale.
- Cologne (Germany), Art Cologne, BOOKMARKS – Hungarian Neo-Avant-garde and Post-Conceptual Art from the Late 1960s to the Present,
- London (United Kingdom), Austin Desmond Fine Arts, Last Year's Snow,
- Novi Sad (Serbia), Museum of Contemporary Art Vojvodina, MoCAV's Acquisitions: Purchases and Gifts (2012–2015)

2016

- Szentendre (Hungary), Vajda Lajos Studió Pinceműhelye, 'Hundred Years of Dadaism'
- Budapest (Hungary), Mai Manó Gallery, The Freedom of the Past. A selection from Róbert Alföldi's photographic collection, neo-Avant-garde photographic art in Hungary from the 1960s to the present day
- Valencia (Spain), Espaivisor Gallery, Poetics and Politics – Artistic Strategies in the Hungarian Neo-Avantgarde,
- Budapest (Hungary), acb NA Gallery, Bosch+Bosch Group: Conceptual Practices from the Former Yugoslavia (curated by Emese Kürti)
- London (UK), Photographers’ Gallery, Feministische Avantgarde (Verbund Collection) (curated by Gabriele Schor and Anna Dannemann)
- Graz (Austria), Künstlerhaus, Autumn Festival Graz 2016, 'Yes, but is it performable?' (curated by Christian Egger)
- Milano (Italy), FM Centre for Contemporary Art, Non-Aligned Modernity. Eastern-European Art from the Marinko Sudac Collection (curated by Marco Scotini)

2017

- Zagreb (Croatia), Apartment Softić, “My sweet little lamb (Everything we see could also be otherwise)”, A series of exhibitions based on the Kontakt Art Collection (curated by: What, How & for Whom/WHW in collaboration with Kathrin Rhomberg)
- Budapest (Hungary), Ludwig Museum, FM Centro per l’Arte Contemporanea, Avantgárd Művészeti Kutatóintézet, "El nem kötelezett művészet – Marinko Sudac gyűjteménye (Non-Aligned Art – Marinko Sudac Collection)" (curated by Marco Scotini)
- Athens (Greece), EMST—National Museum of Contemporary Art, documenta 14 (curated by Hendrik Folkerts)
- Athens (Greece), School Program “Materials Matters”, EMST—National Museum of Contemporary Art, documenta 14
- Vienna (Austria), mumok, Sammlung Verbund Collection, "WOMAN: Feminist Avantgarde of the 1970s" (curated by Gabriele Schor)
- Kassel (Germany), Neue Galerie, documenta 14, (Curated by: Hendrik Folkerts)
- Zagreb (Croatia), Museum of Avant-Garde, Institute for the Research of Avant-Garde and Marinko Sudac Collection, "Umjetnik na odmoru (Artist on Vacation) – Poreč"
- New York (US), Elizabeth Dee Gallery, “With the Eyes of Others: Hungarian Artists of the Sixties and Seventies”. (Curated by: András Szántó)
- Ljubljana (Slovenia), Museum of Contemporary Art Metelkova (+MSUM), "Neposlušne (Disobedient): Eulàlia Grau, Katalin Ladik in Žene u crnom (and the Women in Black)" (Curated by: Bojana Piškur)
- Warsawa (Poland), Warsaw National Museum, The Way They See. An Overview of Hungarian Photography (curated by Gabriella Csizek)
- Budapest (Hungary), acb Gallery, „Summer Show”
- Budapest (Hungary), acb NA, „HEAT - Eroticism in the Underground”
- Karlsruhe (Germany), ZKM, „Feministische Avantgarde der 1970er-Jahre” (18.11.2017-8.04.2018) (Curated by Gabriele Schor and Peter Weibel)
- Žilina (Slovakia), Nová synagóga (New Synagogue), "Poetry & Performance. The Eastern European Perspective" (23.12.2017-10.03.2018) (Curated by Tomáš Glanc, Daniel Grúň and Sabine Hänsgen)
- Berlin (Germany), Akademie der Künste, „Underground und Improvisation. Alternative Musik und Kunst nach 1968” (Curated by David Crowley and Daniel Muzyczuk in collaboration with Angela Lammert)
- Veszprém (Hungary), House of Arts, „Tavaszi újranyitás” ("Spring Reopening"), „Exhibition of contemporary and avant-garde works by Irokéz collection“ (Group show curated by Emese Kürti)
- Pančevo (Serbia), Cultural Centre of Pančevo, "Postorni Agens" ("Agents of Space"), 18. Art Biennal Pančevo (Curated by Andrej Mirčev)

2018

- Brno (Czech Republic), The Brno House of Arts, „Feminist Avant-garde of the 1970s”, (Curated by Gabriele Schor)
- Belgrade (Serbia), Gallery Podroom, Cultural Center of Belgrade, „Poetry and Performance. Eastern European Perspective”, (Curated by Sabine Hänsgen, Tomaš Glanc i Dubravka Đurić)
- Zürich (Switzerland), Shedhalle Zürich, „Poetry and Performance. Eastern European Perspective” (Curated by Tomáš Glanc, Sabine Hänsgen)

2019

- Dresden (Germany), Motorenhalle Dresden, „Poetry and Performance. Eastern European Perspective”, (Curated by Tomáš Glanc, Sabine Hänsgen)
- Budapest (Hungary), Ludwig Múzeum, „Bosch+Bosch csoport és a vajdasági neoavantgárd mozgalom” (The Bosch+Bosch Group and the neo-avant-garde movement in Vojvodina) in collaboration with Marinko Sudac Collection in Zagreb, (Curated by Dorotea Fotivec, Szombathy Bálimt)

2020s

2020

- Wrocław (Poland), Wrocław Contemporary Museum, „Poetry and Performance. Eastern European Perspective”, (Curated by Tomáš Glanc, Sabine Hänsgen, Agata Ciastoń)
- Liberec (Czech Republic), Regional Art Gallery Liberec, Pool Hall, „Poetry and Performance. Eastern European Perspective”, (Curated by Tomáš Glanc, Sabine Hänsgen, Pavel Novotný)

2021

- Dnipro (Ukraine), Dnipro Center for Contemporary Culture, „Poetry and Performance. Eastern European Perspective”, (Curated by Tomáš Glanc, Sabine Hänsgen and Yuri Birte Anderson & Kateryna Rusetska)
- Banská Štiavnica (Slovakia), Parter BSC Association, „A lost man in Banská Štiavnica”, (Curated by Lucia Gregorova Stach)
- Geneva (Switzerland), MAMCO (Musée d´Art Moderne et Contemporain), „Discipline and Perform”, (Curated by Julien Fronsacq, Paul Bernard)
- Timişoara (Romania), ISHO House, „Seasons End”, Art Encounters Biennial, (Curated by Kasia Redzisz, Mihnea Mircan)
- Lodz (Poland), MS - Muzeum Sztuki, „Atlas of Modernity. Exercises”, (Curated by Jarosław Suchan, Jakub Gawkowski, Paulina Kurc-Maj, Daniel Muzyczuk)
- Linz (Austria), Lentos Kunstmuseum, „Female Sensibility” (Curated by Gabriele Schor)
- Budapest (Hungary), Kassák Múzeum, „Poetry and Performance. Eastern European Perspective”, (Curated by Tomáš Glanc, Sabine Hänsgen, Emese Kürti)
- London (United Kingdom), Austin/Desmond Fine Art, „Staying with the Trouble”

2022

- Budapest (Hungary), Ludwig Museum - Museum of Contemporary Art (in Palace of Arts), „Helyiérték – Új szerzemények”,„Place Value – New Acquisitions”, (Curated by Bradák Soma, Dékei Kriszta, Fabényi Julia, Készman József, Szipőcs Krisztina)
- Novi Sad (Serbia), Museum of Contemporary Art Vojvodina (MSUV), „, „Feminist Avant-garde of the 1970s”, (Curated by Gabriele Schor)
- Arles (France), Les Rencontres d'Arles, „Arles 2022: Visible or Invisible, a Summer Revealed”, (Curated by Gabriele Schor) VISIBLE OR INVISIBLE, A SUMMER REVEALED
- Kaunas (Latvia), Photography Gallery, „Unstable Practices”, (Curated by Sanja Kojić Mladenov, Agne Narusyte, Zoran Pantelić, Gintaras Zinkevičius)

== See also ==
- List of Hungarian actors
- List of performance artists
- Marinko Sudac Collection

== Sources ==
=== Resources ===
- Short biography (in Hungarian)
- Kortárs irodalmi adattár (in Hungarian)
- Költészete - Szkárosi Endre: A szó teste (in Hungarian)
- Performansza (in Hungarian)
- Selected poems: Magyar Elektronikus Könyvtár (in Hungarian)
- Katalin Ladik reads from her new volume, Belső vízözön, and performs her sound poems Négy fekete ló mögöttem repül (Four Black Horses Fly Behind Me) and Jégmadár (Icebird) on YouTube (in Hungarian)
- Ludwig Museum: The Hero, the Heroine and the Author - official information about the exhibition
- MoMA: Visiting Katalin Ladik, 2014. All the Cities that Start with "B." Notes from a Trip to Central Europe, Post (MoMa)
- Hendrik Folkerts: Keeping Score: Notation, Embodiment, and Liveness, 2016

=== Literature ===
- Screaming Hole. Poetry, Sound and Action as Intermedia Practice in Katalin Ladik's Work, by Emese Kürti, acb ResearchLab, Budapest, 2017.
- Most important essays about her works (in Hungarian)
- "About her novel "Élhetek az arcodon?", sections from the novel, more about her poetry, interviews". Archived from the original on December 18, 2007.
- Dietmar Unterkofler Grupa 143, Critical Thinking at the Borders of Conceptual Art 1975 – 1980; 2012 (Beograd : Glasnik).
- Tracing the Subversive Femininities in the Socialist Yugoslavia: An Analysis of Katalin Ladik's Poetry and Performances of the 1970s By Vera Balind; Department of Gender Studies, CEU, 2011
- Antoni Michnik, Historical snapshots from the neoavant-garde history in the Eastern Bloc: portrait-collage of Katalin Ladik, glissando nr.30; 2016
