= Berta Türk =

Hungarian actress (1888–1960)

- Türk Berta
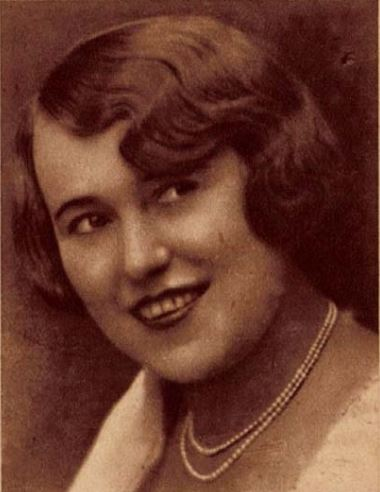
- Berta Türk in 1928
- Born: Berta Czeczilia Türk; 22 April 1888; Vienna, Austria-Hungary (now Austria)
- Died: 29 April 1960 (aged 72); Sydney, Australia
- Other name: R. Berta Türk
- Occupations: Singer; actress
- Spouse: Sándor Rott (m. 1910–1942; his death)
- Children: 4

Berta Czeczilia Türk (22 April 1888 – 29 April 1960), was an Austrian-born Hungarian cabaret singer, and actress of stage and film. She was married to actor Sándor Rott.

== Early life and family ==
Berta Türk was born on 22 April 1888, in Vienna, Austria-Hungary (now Austria), to parents Erzsébet Reiner and Gyula Türk. Her older brother, Max Türk, was a circus performer and juggler; her brother-in-law Karl Kneidinger, was a well-known Austrian and German theater director; and her sister in-law, Lola Urban–Kneidinger, was a well-known German actress. As a child she performed on cabaret stages, including at the Lustspiel Theater (or Lustspieltheater) in Vienna. In her youth she worked with actress Hansi Niese, among others.

She married actor Sándor Rott on 31 May 1910, and converted to Judaism. They had three sons, and a daughter.

== Career ==
Her career began with a contract with the Folies Caprice in Budapest in 1910. She grew in popularity with songs performed in the German language; and later she continued this genre in the Hungarian language with an accent. From 1918 until 1927, she was part of the company at "Little Comedy Theater" (Kis Komédia), which was founded by her husband Rott, and his acting partner Géza Steinhardt. Between 1927 and 1928, and again in 1935 to 1944, she was a part of the company at "Comedy Theater" (Komédia).

After the World War II, she appeared in the Kamara Variete, the Népvariete and the Royal Revü Variete. She founded the Sörkabaré company in 1946, which was short lived.

Türk emigrated to Sydney, Australia in 1949, to live with her child Kató Rott. She died from suicide on 29 April 1960, in Sydney.

== Filmography ==
- Der Schusterprinz (1914), directed by Ernst Marischka; as Mrs. Zsuzsi the cook
- Az újszülött apa (1916), directed by Eugen Illés; as mama
- Jobb erkölcsöket! (1918), directed by Eugen Illés; as "half-world lady"
- Te csak pipálj Ladányi (1938), directed by Márton Keleti; as German guest in the boarding house
- Without Lies (Hungarian: Hazugság nélkül) (1946), directed by Viktor Gertler; as neighbor
