= Sándor Rott =

Hungarian actor (1868–1942)

- Rott Sándor
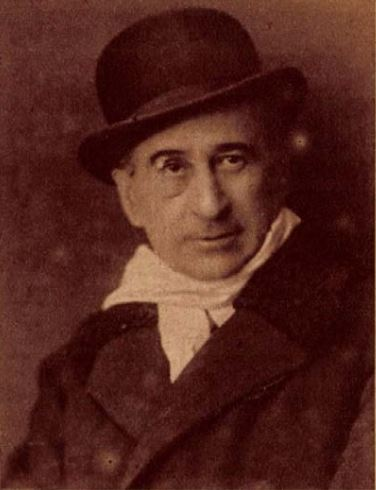
- Born: Sándor Rottmann; 27 November 1868; Pest, Budapest, Austria-Hungary (now Hungary)
- Died: 16 December 1942; Budapest, Hungary
- Burial place: Kozma Street Cemetery
- Other names: Alexander Rott
- Occupation(s): Actor, theater director, screenwriter
- Spouse: Berta Türk (m. 1910–1942; his death)
- Children: 4

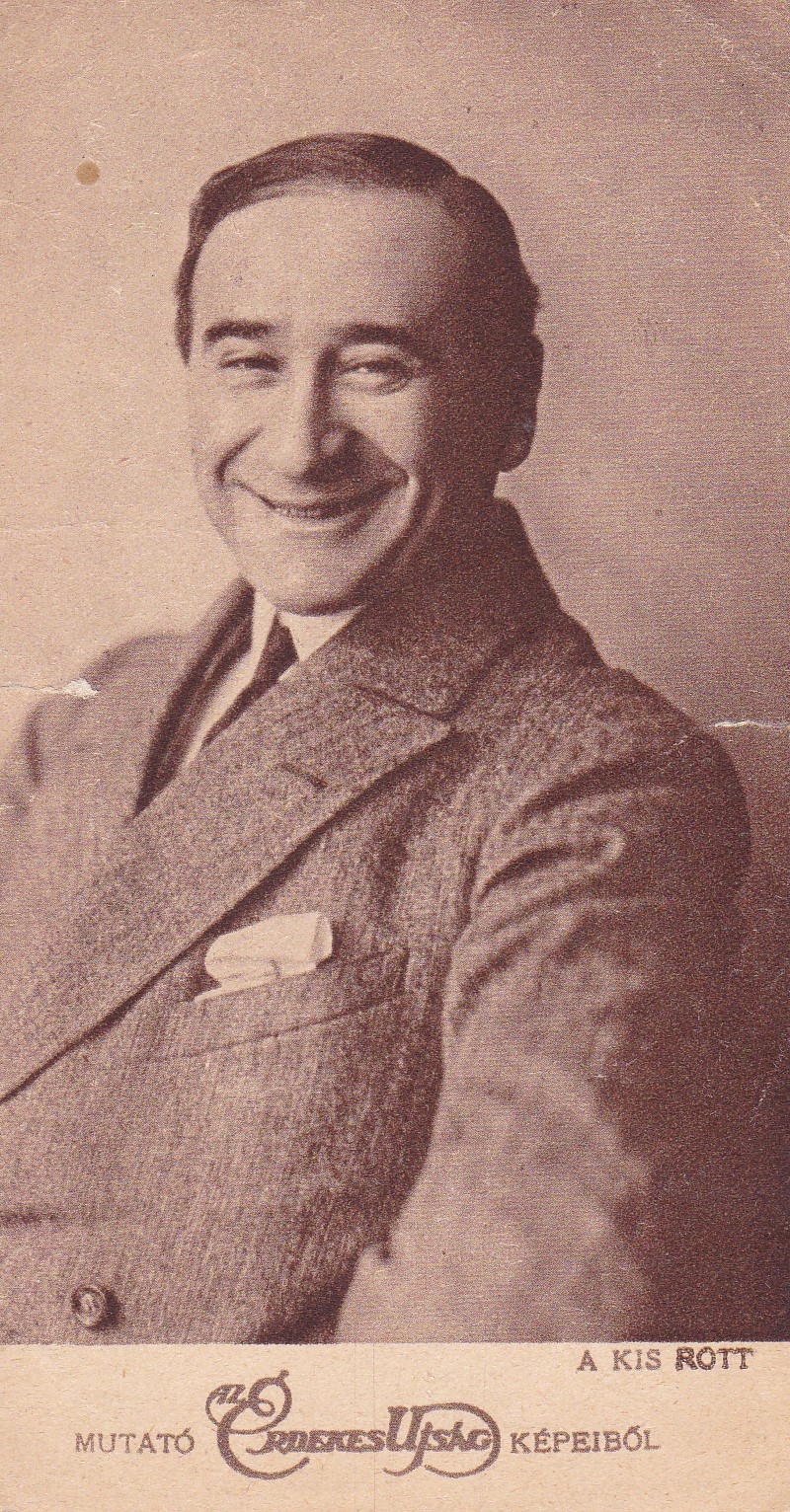
Sándor Rott (or kis Rottról)

Sándor Rott (né Sándor Rottmann; 27 November 1868 – 16 December 1942), was a Hungarian actor, theater director, and screenwriter. He was nicknamed, Hungarian: kis Rottról, lit. 'Little Rott', and was known for his comic roles.

== Early life and family ==
Sándor Rott was born with the name Sándor Rottmann on 27 November 1868, in Pest in Budapest, Austria-Hungary (now Hungary). He was Jewish. His parents were Adolf Rottmann (1821–1908) a tailor, and Katalin Silbermann (1835–1916), the family lived in the Jewish quarter (Erzsébetváros) on Király Street.

On 31 May 1910, he married the actress/singer Berta Türk in Terézváros, Budapest. His wife converted to Judaism; and they had three sons and a daughter.

== Career ==
His career began with a contract with the Folies Caprice in 1891, where Rott gained popularity, together with his partner, Géza Steinhardt. There he became one of Budapest's best-known actors. Rott made several guest appearances in Vienna, where he proved to be a first-rate comedian.

He was an independent theater director in the capital for ten years, and between 1918 and 1927, he led the "Little Comedy Theater" (Kis Komédia) together with Steinhardt. In 1928, he performed as a guest at the Budapest Operetta Theatre and the Andrássy út Szinház theatre, followed by a tour in German-speaking countries, and some neighboring countries until 1935. He was known for his performance in Kalábriászparti (English: Calabrian Coast) which was a mute comedy role.

Rott wrote his autobiography, kis Rottról (1941). He died on 16 December 1942 in Budapest.

== Filmography ==
=== As actor ===
- A suszterherceg (1914), as Kóbius the cobbler
- Az újszülött apa (1916), as a servant
- Jobb erkölcsöket! (1916), as outgoing husband
- Az erkölcsliga (1918)
- Az önkéntes tűzoltó (1918)

== See also ==
- List of Hungarian actors
