= Ottó Tolnai =

Serbo-Hungarian writer (1940–2025)

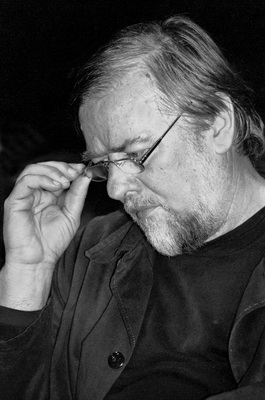
- Born: 5 July 1940; Stara Kanjiža, Kingdom of Yugoslavia
- Died: 27 March 2025 (aged 84)
- Alma mater: University of Novi Sad
- Occupations: Writer, poet, and translator
- Writing career
- Notable awards: Kossuth Prize (2007)

Ottó Tolnai (Serbian Cyrillic: Ото Толнаи, 5 July 1940 – 27 March 2025) was a Yugoslav and Hungarian writer, poet and translator, and a recipient of the Kossuth Prize. He was one of the most versatile and outstanding figures of Hungarian literature in Vojvodina. His works have been published in Serbian, Hungarian, Polish, Slovenian, and German.

== Life and work ==
Tolnai was born on 5 July 1940 in the town of Stara Kanjiža, located on the banks of the Tisa River. Between 1955 and 1959, he attended the Hungarian high school in Senta. From 1959 to 1962, he studied Hungarian language and literature and philosophy at the University of Novi Sad and later at the University of Zagreb.

He began publishing in 1956, initially with short prose, and from 1960, he also wrote poetry. From 1961, he co-edited the Symposion supplement of the Novi Sad-based Ifjúság weekly alongside István Domonkos, Kálmán Fehér, and István Koncz. He later became a founding editor of Új Symposion when it launched in 1964 and served as its editor-in-chief from 1969 to 1974, until he was forced to leave under pressure from Yugoslav censorship.

Between 1974 and 1994, he worked as an editor and art critic for the Hungarian-language broadcast of Novi Sad Radio. He was recognized as an art writer ever afterwards. From 1992 to 2004, after Új Symposion ceased publication, he became the editor-in-chief of Ex Symposion, which was published in Veszprém. Thereafter, he served as the president of its editorial board.

From his youth, he lived in Novi Sad, where he and his friends, including István Domonkos and László Végel, quickly became key figures in the local literary and cultural scene. His first poetry collection was published in 1963, and his first novel, rovarház, in 1969. In between, in 1967, he received the Híd Prize, a prestigious literary award in Vojvodina, which he won again thirteen years later. In 1968, he co-authored a book with István Domonkos titled Valóban mi lesz velünk, published as part of the Symposion Könyvek series.

His monodrama Bayer aspirin was performed at the Novi Sad Theatre in 1981, directed by Miklós Jancsó and featuring Katalin Ladik.

From 1966 to 1990, he was a member of the Association of Writers of Yugoslavia, serving as its last president before its dissolution. From 1994 onwards, he lived in Palić, near Subotica. In 1998, he was elected an honorary member of the Széchenyi Academy of Literature and Arts. In 2001, he became a member of the Digital Literary Academy. He spent a year in Berlin in 2004 on a DAAD scholarship. In 2005, he received the Hungarian Literary Prize for his book Költő disznózsírból. In 2007, he was awarded the Kossuth Prize.

In writing fictional encyclopedia entries (Új Tolnai világlexikona) he sought to explain concepts that were missing from Tolnai Világlexikon or whose definitions he found incomplete. In these entries, he conducted serious studies on topics such as pufajka (quilted jacket), Lídia lining, Ottó Bláthy, eggs, and orchids.

Tolnai died on 27 March 2025, at the age of 84.

Preceded by Slobodan Selenić	President of the Association of Writers of Yugoslavia; 1990	Succeeded by office abolished
