= Hungarian PEN Club =

Hungarian PEN Club is an affiliate of International PEN. The Hungarian Club was established in 1926 by Antal Radó. Early writers associated with the club included Albert Berzeviczy and Jenő Rákosi. Prominent members include Zsolt Harsányi, Miklós Hubay, Dezső Kosztolányi, Sándor Márai, Árpád Göncz, Gábor Görgey, and Zoltán Sumonyi.

== Janus Pannonius Grand Prize for Poetry ==
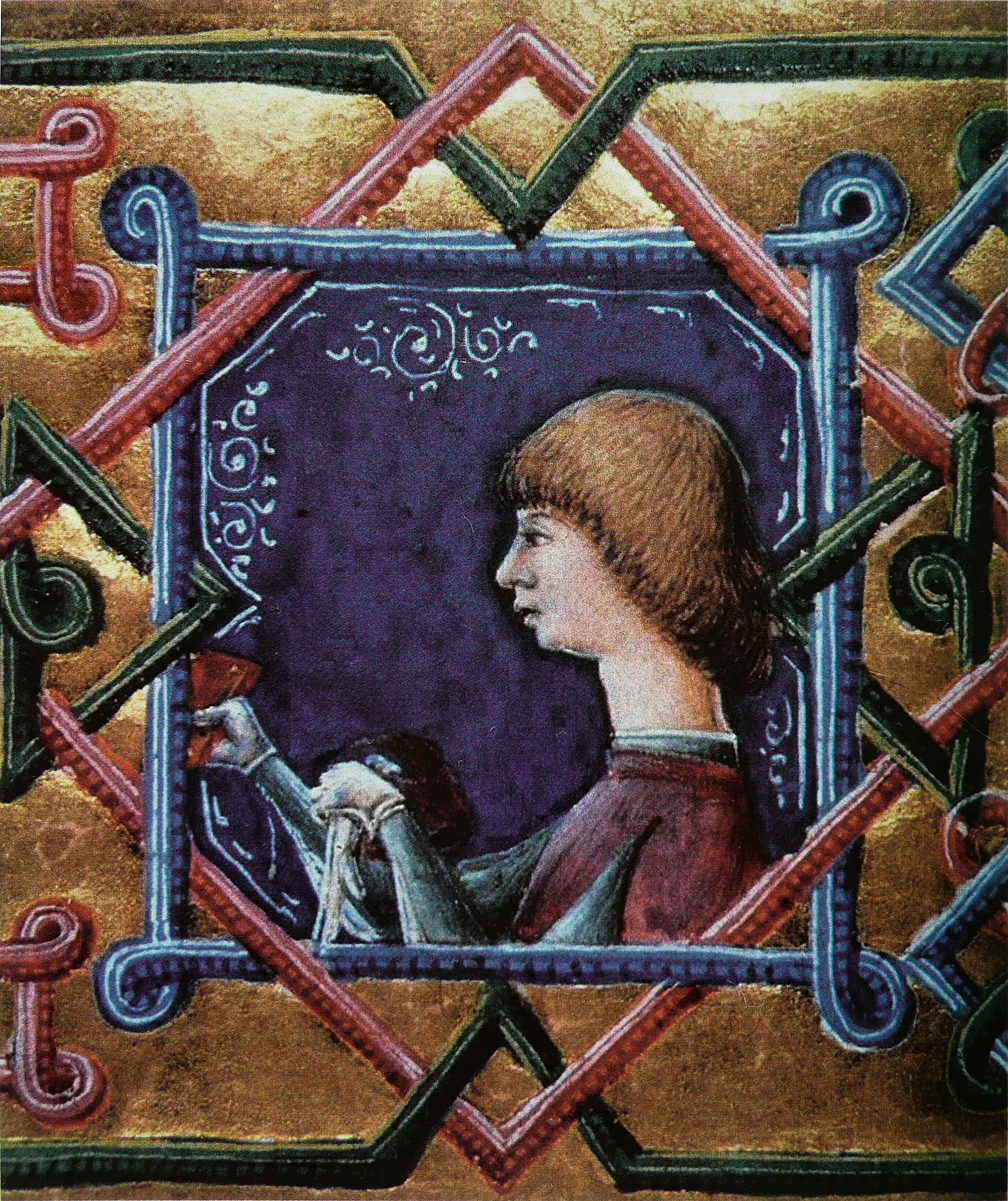
Janus Pannonius

In 2012, the club established a new literary award for International poetry called the Janus Pannonius International Poetry Prize, later renamed the Grand Prize for Poetry. It includes a prize of €50,000 funded by the Hungarian government. The award is named in honor of Hungarian poet Janus Pannonius (1434–1472) and is presented yearly on his birthday, August 29. There are also two translation prizes, each with the award of €3,000.

In 2012, the inaugural award was rejected by American recipient Lawrence Ferlinghetti due to concerns over human rights issues in Hungary under Prime Minister Viktor Orbán, since the award is sponsored by the Hungarian government. Ferlinghetti wrote that "Since the policies of this right-wing regime tend toward authoritarian rule and the consequent curtailing of freedom of expression and civil liberties, I find it impossible for me to accept the Prize in the United States. Thus, I must refuse the prize in its present terms." In 2013, the club announced that "To avoid similar concerns in the future, the financial part of the prize has been sourced from private donations alone."

=== Honorees ===
2012

- Grand Prize: Lawrence Ferlinghetti (United States)
- Translation prize: Ithamar Jáoz-ready (Israel) and Javorsky Bela (Hungary)

2013

- Grand Prize: Simin Behbahani (Iran)
- Translation Prize: László Márton
- Translation Prize: Péter Rácz

2014

- Grand Prize: Adunis (Adonis) (Syria)
- Grand Prize: Yves Bonnefoy (France)
- Translation Prize: Zoltán Csehy
- Lifetime Award for Translation: György Gömöri

2015

- Grand Prize: Charles Bernstein (United States)
- Grand Prize: Giuseppe Conte (Italy)
- Translation Prize: Wilhelm Droste
- Lifetime Award for Translation: Ádám Makkai

2016

- Grand Prize: Adam Zagajewski
- Translation Prize: Gyula Kodolányi
- Lifetime Award for Translation: Pál Sohár
- Filius Ursae Award: János Dénes Orbán

2017

- Grand Prize: Augusto de Campos
- Translation Prize: Ádám Nádasdy
- Translation Prize: Hans-Henning Paetzke
- Filius Ursae Award: Katalin Ladik

2018

- Grand Prize: Yang Lian
- Translation Prize: Clive Wilmer
- Translation Prize: Pál Ferenc
- Filius Ursae Award: Sántha Attila

2019

- Grand Prize: Clara Janés Nadal
- Translation Prize: Judit Vihar
- Translation Prize: Gilevszki Paszkal
- Filius Ursae Award: Zsolt Győrei
