= Tamas Menyhart =

Belgian actor

Tamas Menyhart is a Belgian actor born in Budapest, the capital city of Hungary. Tamas Menyhart came to the United States and is now living in Los Angeles, California. He is known for several films including Immortals, Duel of Legends, ICE Agent, and Greater Threat. Tamas Menyhart has acted in various television series including Without a Trace, Samantha Who?, starring Christina Applegate among many other television series.

== Life and career ==
While growing up in Belgium Tamas Menyhart studied the field of martial arts. He sought out training from some of the top instructors around and studied the martial arts for many years. He decided to become an actor at an early age and moved to Los Angeles where he finally landed his first acting role in a television movie called Out of Darkness where he portrayed the character Detective Claude Louis. Since then he has moved on to do other television roles and major movies such as the character Heraklion, a fictional character from the movie Immortals. Tamas Menyhart has worked on the same movies and television sets with notable actors such as Mickey Rourke, John Hurt and Isaac C. Singleton Jr. and others.

== Filmography ==
=== Feature films ===
Year	Title	Role
2004	Out of Darkness	Detective Claude Louis
2007	The Rapture	SWAT 4 - Leader
2008	Greater Threat	Nicolai
2011	Immortals	Heraklion
2013	ICE Agent	Nicolia
2013	Duel of Legends	Frank
2014	A Fighting Chance	Arnold

=== Television ===
Year	Title	Role
2007	Viva Laughlin	Pool guy
2007	Samantha Who?	Kissing Couple
2007	Without a Trace	Henchman
2007	The Mentalist	Stans

=== Documentary ===
Year	Title	Role
2008	The World Without US	Swat
