= László Csiky =

Hungarian stage actor, (1863 – 1936)

László Csiky of Szentkirályszabadja, also known as Csikász (Vác, March 14, 1863 – Budapest, August 23, 1936), was an actor and theater director.

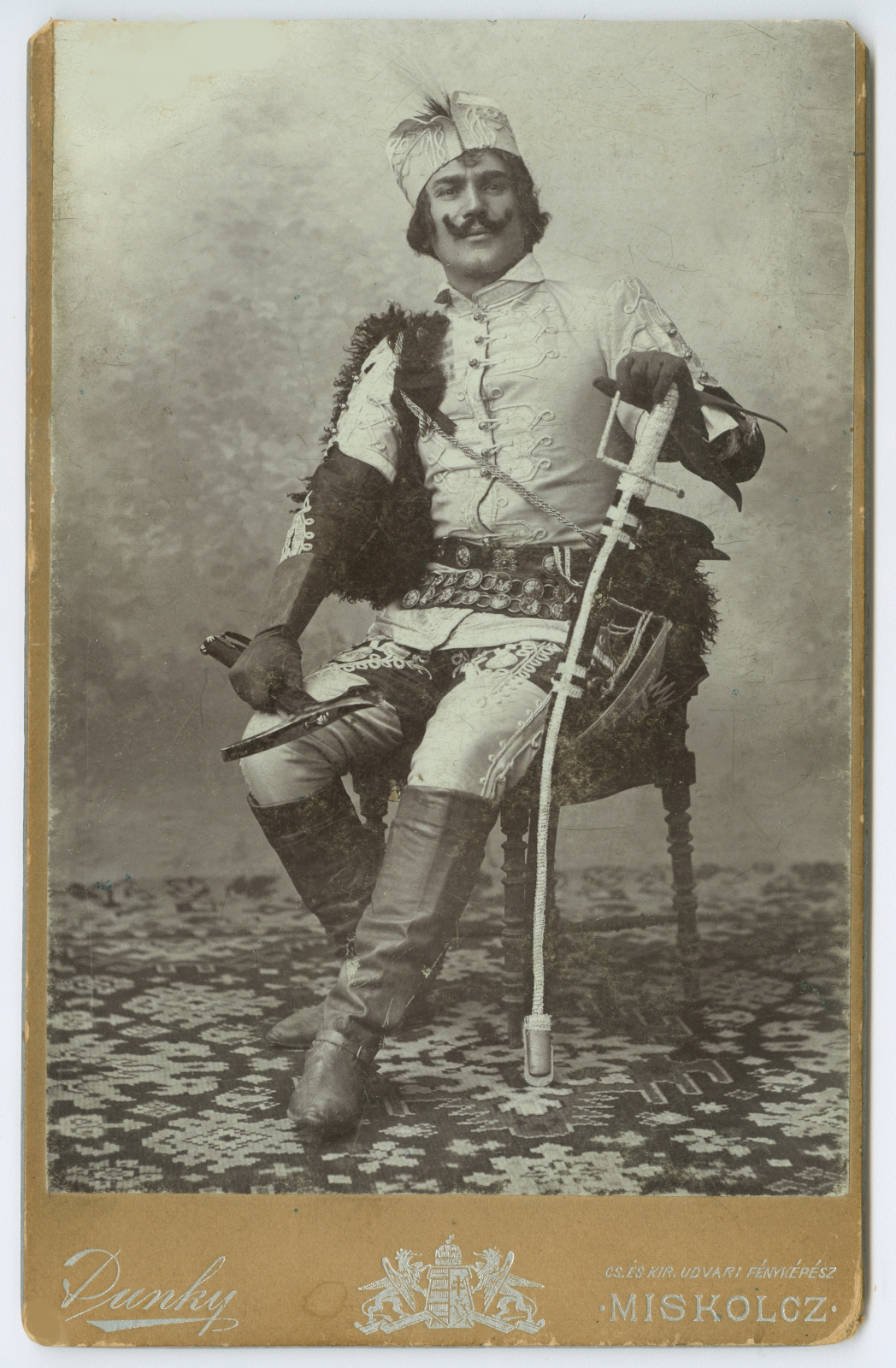
László Csiky in the costume of Brigadier Ocskay, around 1890, in Miskolc

== Life ==
His father was Captain János Csikász, and his mother was Teréz Albrecht. He completed his schooling in his hometown and Budapest. On Easter Sunday in 1880, against his parents' wishes, he became an actor in Csurgó, where Károly Szathmáry was the director at the time. His first role was Lajos in "Falu rossza." After a short stint traveling in the countryside, he enrolled in the Academy of Drama, but only stayed for a year. In 1884, he moved to Kolozsvár, where he achieved great success as Ferdinand in "Ármány és szerelem" (Intrigue and Love), becoming a favorite of the renowned tragic actor, Gyula Ecsedi Kovács. He worked there for three years, and from 1887, he performed in Debrecen, Kassa, Szeged, Temesvár, Pozsony, Buda, Pécs, Szabadka, and Miskolc, always receiving widespread acclaim. On February 11, 1905, he celebrated his 25th anniversary in Debrecen, performing in "Wallenstein halála" (The Death of Wallenstein). On March 9, 1911, in Szeged, he celebrated his 30-year artistic career with "Othello." He worked in Szeged until 1914, then retired on July 25 of the same year in Gyula, with a performance in "Lear király" (King Lear). He served as a clerk at the Ministry of Agriculture for a long time. As a councilor of the Actors' Association, he contributed greatly to the cultural aspirations of provincial theater. He retired on September 1, 1914. He was laid to rest in the Kerepesi Cemetery, and his grave is now located in the Farkasréti Cemetery (Hv26. (126.) plot).

His wife,Ida Tájkerti, was an actress born on January 1, 1872, in Székesfehérvár. They married on September 12, 1891, in Budapest, at the Erzsébetváros church. He retired on January 1, 1915.

== Significant theatrical roles ==
- Robespierre (Sardou)
- Elder Nagy István (Sándor Bródy: A tanítónő)
- Consul Bernick (Ibsen: A társadalom támaszai)
- Márton Csorba (Ferenc Csepreghy: A sárga csikó)
- Wallenstein (Schiller: W. halála)
- Louis IV
- Dózsa György
- Kuruc Feja Dávid
- Miklós Toldi
- Othello
- Hamlet
- Shylock
- Macbeth
- Coriolanus
- Richard III
- Brutus
- Romeo
- Ferenc Moór
- Gyuri Bandi (Betyár kendője)
- Svengali
- Philip Derblay
- Ipanoff

== Film roles ==
- Akit ketten szeretnek (1915)
- Hófehérke (1916)
- A vörös Sámson (1917)

== Career ==
1880: Károly Szathmáry;

1882: János Nyéki;

1883: Andor Sztupa;

1884–86: Kolozsvár;

1886–88: Lajos Jakab;

1888: Gerő Aradi;

1889: Dezső Tiszay; Lajos Valentin;

1891: Lajos Makó;

1892: Károly Somogyi;

1893: Dezső Tiszay;

1894–96: Ignác Krecsányi;

1896–98: Károly Somogyi;

1898: András Leszkay;

1899: I. Lajos Pesti;

1900: Sándor Csóka;

1901: János Mezei;

1902: Zilahy;

1903–05: Lajos Makó;

1905–07: Andorfy;

1907: Kálmán Balla;

1908–11: Mrs. Makó;

1911–1914: Almássy.

== Sources ==
- Hungarian Theater Encyclopedia
- Hungarian Theater Lexicon (1929–1931, edited by Aladár Schöpflin)
