= Veronika Madár =

Hungarian actress

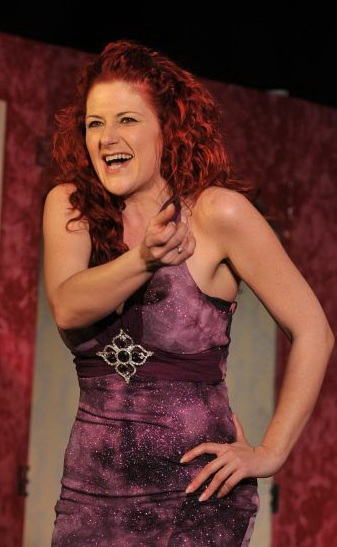
Veronika Madár

Veronika Madár (born May 5, 1976) is a Hungarian film and stage actress.

She is married to Richárd Landor, flight instructor.

== Selected filmography ==
- Jóban Rosszban, telenovela, 2005–2022, as Gyöngyi Galambos
- Cop Mortem, 2015, as Zsuzsa Tiszai, history professor
- Oltári történetek, 2022, as Mária Prókai

== Awards ==
- 2014: Pepita Award (silver award)
- 2016: Megyei Prima Díj, from Közép-Mo.-i Regionális Szervezet (Central Hungary Regional Organization)
