= Géza Steinhardt =

Hungarian actor (1873–1944)

- Steinhardt Géza
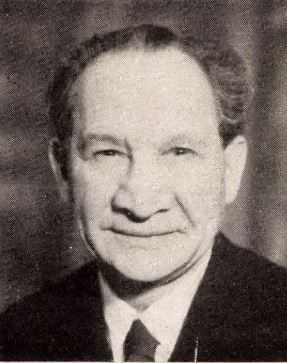
- Born: Géza Szekeres; 1873; Levice, Austria-Hungary (now Slovakia)
- Died: c. November 1944; Budapest, Hungary
- Other names: Géza Goldstein
- Occupation(s): Actor, theater director, film producer, screenplay writer, author

Géza Steinhardt (né Géza Szekeres; 1873–1944) was a Hungarian stage and film actor, theater director, film producer, screenplay writer, and author. He was a Jewish and known for his comic roles. Steinhardt was murdered in the Holocaust during World War II.

== Biography ==
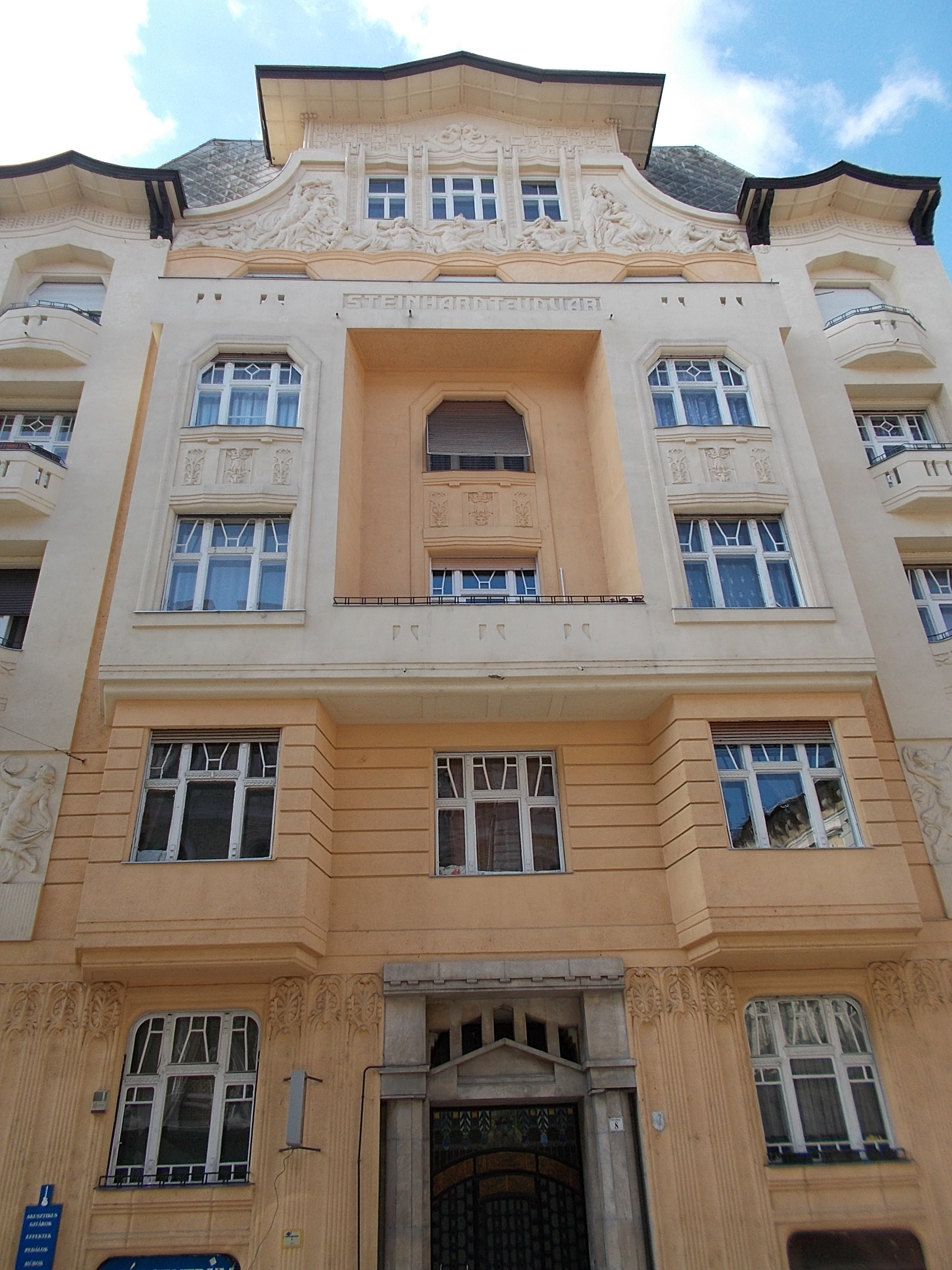
Steinhardt house, built in 1907 by architect Gyula Fodor in Erzsébetváros, Budapest

Géza Steinhardt was born with the name Géza Szekeres on 1873 in Levice, Austria-Hungary (now Slovakia). Some records have his name at birth as Géza Goldstein.

He began his career in 1890 at the Folies Caprices, where he partnered with actor Sándor Rott and he remained for 18 years. In 1908, he opened the Trocadero amusement park (Hungarian: Trocadero mulatót) on Rákóczi Avenue, which he operated until 1917. He enlisted as a soldier in 1917, during World War I. Between September 1918 and 1927, he led the "Little Comedy Theater" (Kis Komédia) together with Rott. From 1930 until 1932, he operated the Steinhardt Stage (Hungarian: Steinhardt Színpadot). Over time he switched from German-language performances to Hungarian-language only. and created great popularity for the genre.

His authored books include: Hungarian: Steinhardt mesél, lit. 'Steinhardt Tells Stories' (1935); and Hungarian: Ötven víg esztendő, 1890–1940, lit. 'Fifty Years of Fun, 1890–1940' (1942).

During either November, or December 1944, the Arrow Cross Party, a far-right fascist Hungarian ultranationalist party, marched him and his wife to the edge of the Danube River, where they were shot and pushed into the water.

== Filmography ==
=== As actor ===
- Dódi karrierje (1915)
- Link és Flink (1927), as Léha Dezsõ, Dódi

=== As producer ===
- Prisoner Number Seven (1929)

=== As writer ===
- Dódi karrierje (1915)

== See also ==
- Shoes on the Danube Bank
