= Borrowed Husbands (1942 film) =

1942 film

- Directed by: Viktor Bánky
- Written by: László Szilágyi
- Produced by: Árpád Tasnády
- Starring: Erzsi Simor; László Szilassy; Piroska Vaszary
- Cinematography: Árpád Makay
- Edited by: Zoltán Farkas
- Music by: Mihály Eisemann
- Production company: Délibáb Filmgyártó
- Distributed by: Mester Film
- Release date: 27 February 1942
- Running time: 94 minutes
- Country: Hungary
- Language: Hungarian

Borrowed Husbands (Hungarian: Kölcsönkért férjek) is a 1942 Hungarian comedy film directed by Viktor Bánky and starring Erzsi Simor, László Szilassy and Piroska Vaszary. It was shot at the Hunnia Studios in Budapest. The film's sets were designed by the art director József Simoncsics.

== Cast ==
- Erzsi Simor as Kelecsényi Erzsike
- László Szilassy as Beretvás Johnny
- Piroska Vaszary as Hitzingerné, Róza néni
- Tivadar Bilicsi as Berkenye
- Ilona Dajbukát as A kisfiú anyja
- Sándor Pethes as Góliát Ádám
- József Juhász as Schulek
- Lajos Sugár as Komlós ügyvédje
- Terka Császár as Kati, cseléd
- István Falussy as Beretvás bácsi
- Gusztáv Harasztos as Vendég a szállodában
- Lajos Köpeczi Boócz as Komlós Elek
- Vilma Madaras as Kelecsényi Lenke
- Lacika Makkai as Kisfiú
- Blanka Raffay as Muci, albérlõ
- Rózsi Szerdahelyi as Virágfutár
- Biri Szondy as Kelecsényi Zsuzsi
- Gyula Turóczy as Szállodaportás
- Ilona Kökény

== Bibliography ==
- Juhász, István. Kincses magyar filmtár 1931–1944: az eredeti forgatókönyvből 1931 és 1944 között létrejött hazai mozgóképekről. Kráter, 2007.
- Nemeskürty, István. A képpé varázsolt idő: a magyar film története és helye az egyetemes kultúrában, párhuzamos kitekintéssel a világ filmművészetére. Magvető, 1983.
- Rîpeanu, Bujor. (ed.) International Directory of Cinematographers, Set- and Costume Designers in Film: Hungary (from the beginnings to 1988). Saur, 1981.
