= Taken by the Flood =

1941 film

- Directed by: Endre Rodríguez
- Written by: Géza Csörögi; Endre Rodríguez
- Produced by: Pál Siklóssy
- Starring: Nusi Somogyi; Valéria Hidvéghy; Erzsi Simor
- Cinematography: Károly Vass
- Edited by: László Katonka
- Music by: Béla Dolecskó
- Production companies: Csörögi Film; Hunnia Filmgyár
- Distributed by: Koncz Film
- Release date: 14 January 1941
- Running time: 75 minutes
- Country: Hungary
- Language: Hungarian

Taken by the Flood (Hungarian: Akit elkap az ár) is a 1941 Hungarian drama film directed by Endre Rodríguez and starring Nusi Somogyi, Valéria Hidvéghy and Erzsi Simor. It was shot at the Hunnia Studios in Budapest. The film's sets were designed by the art director János Horváth.

== Cast ==
- László Földényi as Horváth Ferenc
- Nusi Somogyi as Eveline
- Valéria Hidvéghy as Horváth Ilonka
- Erzsi Simor as Sylvia
- Ilona Dajbukát as Julis
- Ottó Jeney as Péterfy Jenõ
- Béla Mihályffi as Kémelhárító fõnök
- György Solthy as Szakács vezérigazgató
- Gyula Szöreghy as Portás
- Mihály Erdélyi as Gordon
- Ferenc Pethes as János, inas
- Pál Vessely as Ingatlanügynök
- Ilona Kökény as Feketéné
- Tihamér Lázár as üzemi titkár
- Dezsõ Pártos as Börtönpap
- Ferenc Szabó as Szücs - tisztviselõ
- Dezsö Szalóky as Antal - irodaszolga
- Gusztáv Vándory as Bankigazgató

== Bibliography ==
- Juhász, István. Kincses magyar filmtár 1931-1944: az eredeti forgatókönyvből 1931 és 1944 között létrejött hazai mozgóképekről. Kráter, 2007.
- Rîpeanu, Bujor. (ed.) International Directory of Cinematographers, Set- and Costume Designers in Film: Hungary (from the beginnings to 1988). Saur, 1981.
