= Male Fidelity =

1942 film

- Directed by: József Daróczy
- Written by: József Daróczy; Zoltán Nagyiványi; Endre Rodríguez
- Produced by: József Daróczy
- Starring: Antal Páger; Klári Tolnay; Elma Bulla
- Cinematography: Rudolf Icsey
- Edited by: Zoltán Kerényi
- Music by: Dénes Buday
- Production company: Hajdu Film
- Distributed by: Mester Film
- Release date: 23 October 1942
- Running time: 95 minutes
- Country: Hungary
- Language: Hungarian

Male Fidelity (Hungarian: Férfihüség) is a 1942 Hungarian drama film directed by József Daróczy and starring Antal Páger, Klári Tolnay and Elma Bulla. It was shot at the Hunnia Studios in Budapest. The film's sets were designed by the art director László Dudás.

== Cast ==
- Antal Páger as Sándorffy Péter
- Klári Tolnay as Dunay Maya, french doctor
- Elma Bulla as Júlia, wife of Sándorffy
- Andor Ajtay as Cserháti János, lawyer
- Béla Mihályffi as Sármány Pál, chief executive officer
- Mariska Vízváry as aunt Laura
- Sándor Pethes as uncle Józsi
- Mária Keresztessy as Sári
- Irén Pelsöczy as Erzsike, nurse
- Vera Szemere as florist
- Nándor Bihary as Budapest hotel receptionist
- László Dévényi as young boy at the minister's
- Sándor Hidassy as gatekeeper at factory
- Árpád Lehotay as minister
- Jenö Pataky as Miklós, secretary of the minister
- Miklós Pataki as head waiter
- Zoltán Szakáts as uncle Józsi's friend
- Endre C. Turáni as Bandi, engineer
- Lajos Vértes as Maya's father, doctor
- Gusztáv Vándory as doctor
- Ferenc Szabó as conductor.
- Imre Toronyi as schoolmaster
- Lajos Sugár as Kolozsvár hotel receptionist
- Éva Bíró as Margit, hairdresser

== Bibliography ==
- Juhász, István. Kincses magyar filmtár 1931–1944: az eredeti forgatókönyvből 1931 és 1944 között létrejött hazai mozgóképekről. Kráter, 2007.
- Rîpeanu, Bujor. (ed.) International Directory of Cinematographers, Set- and Costume Designers in Film: Hungary (from the beginnings to 1988). Saur, 1981.
