= Left-Handed Angel =

1941 film

- Directed by: Ákos Ráthonyi
- Written by: Imre Jeney
- Produced by: Antal Takács
- Starring: Clara Tabody; Pál Jávor; Gerö Mály
- Cinematography: Károly Vass
- Edited by: Zoltán Kerényi
- Music by: Szabolcs Fényes
- Production company: Mester Film
- Release date: 12 April 1941
- Running time: 85 minutes
- Country: Hungary
- Language: Hungarian

Left-Handed Angel (Hungarian: Balkezes angyal) is a 1941 Hungarian comedy film directed by Ákos Ráthonyi and starring Clara Tabody, Pál Jávor and Gerö Mály. It was shot at the Hunnia Studios in Budapest. The film's sets were designed by the art director Márton Vincze.

== Synopsis ==
Klári lives in Budapest with her widowed mother and works first in a porcelain and then a flower shop. She manages to prevent a marriage of convenience being arranged by Uncle Zsiga of the wealthy Palotay family for his nephew Miklós, and then captivates Miklós herself.

== Cast ==
- Clara Tabody as Klári
- Pál Jávor as Palotay Miklós
- Gerö Mály as Zsiga bácsi
- Juliska Ligeti as Klári mamája
- Lili Berky as Palotayné
- Piroska Vaszary as Viktória
- Éva Libertiny as Vörös Ica mûvésznõ
- Emmi Nagy as Mende Vera
- Gabi Szabó as Mende Vera
- Anci Barna as Magda
- Lajos Boray as Palotay
- Andor Sárossy as Peches úr
- Zoltán Makláry as Mihály bácsi
- György Solthy as Mende Balázs
- László Misoga as orcelánkereskedõ
- Géza Berczy as Vera udvarlója
- Iván Ruttkay as Klári öccse
- Gusztáv Vándory as ügyvéd
- József Berky as Cigányprímás
- Irma Cserei as Vevö a virágboltban
- Lenke Egyed as öltöztetõnõ
- László Földényi as ügyvéd
- György Hajnal as Postás
- Margit Lánczy as Vera édesanyja
- Marika Lányi as Marika, eladó a virágboltban
- Tihamér Lázár as Rendõrfõnök
- József Mátray as ügyvéd
- Ferenc Pataki as pincér az Aranykacsában
- Sándor Pethes as Ispán
- Ferenc Szabó as Inas

== Bibliography ==
- Juhász, István. Kincses magyar filmtár 1931–1944: az eredeti forgatókönyvből 1931 és 1944 között létrejött hazai mozgóképekről. Kráter, 2007.
- Rîpeanu, Bujor. (ed.) International Directory of Cinematographers, Set- and Costume Designers in Film: Hungary (from the beginnings to 1988). Saur, 1981.
- Vilmos, Várkonyi. Jávor Pál: és a magyar film aranykora. Zima Szabolcs, 2013
