= The Wrong Man (1938 film) =

1938 film

- Directed by: Viktor Gertler
- Written by: Adorján Bónyi; Viktor Gertler
- Produced by: Péter Bajusz; László Vincze
- Starring: Margit Dajka; Ferenc Kiss; Gerö Mály
- Cinematography: István Eiben
- Edited by: Viktor Bánky
- Music by: Paul Abraham
- Production companies: Hunnia Filmgyár; Terra Film
- Release date: 25 March 1938
- Running time: 85 minutes
- Country: Hungary
- Language: Hungarian

The Wrong Man (Hungarian: Elcserélt ember) is a 1938 Hungarian drama film directed by Viktor Gertler and starring Margit Dajka, Ferenc Kiss and Gerö Mály. It was shot at the Hunnia Studios in Budapest. The film's sets were designed by the art director Béla Mátyus. It was made as a co-production between Hunnia and the German firm Terra Film.

== Cast ==
- Margit Dajka as Anna, Benedek Péter felesége
- Ferenc Kiss as Benedek Péter
- Juliska Ligeti as Pongrácz anyja
- Gerö Mály as Benedek Tamás
- Piroska Vaszary as Róza, Tamás szerelme
- Béla Mihályffi as Fõtisztelendõ
- Mici Haraszti as Anna anyja
- Erzsi Simor as Losonczy Ágnes
- Attila Petheö as Ezredes
- Ferenc Pethes as Vecsernyés Kristóf
- Lajos Köpeczi Boócz as Könyvkereskedõ
- Károly Kovács as Fõhadnagy
- Imre Apáthi as Földváry
- Karola Zala as Özvegyasszony a bálon
- Aranka Gazdy as Özvegy a bálon
- Lajos Ujváry as Vendég a bálon
- Sándor Solymossy as Vendég a kávémérésben
- Sándor Pethes as Fõhadnagy
- János Balassa as Pincér
- István Dózsa as Gépkezelõ munkás
- György Hajnal as Pincér a debreceni kávéházban
- Géza Márky as Táncoló fiú az estélyen
- Dezsö Szalóky as Pincér a bálon
- János Doktor as Barzó Dénes
- Péter Szõts D. as A katonai kórház fõorvosa
- Miklós Pataki
- János Forgács
- Magda Rózsássy
- Gusztáv Vándory
- Irén Sitkey
- Grete Riedl
- László Misoga
- Lajos Sugár

== Bibliography ==
- Balski, Grzegorz . Directory of Eastern European Film-makers and Films 1945-1991. Flicks Books, 1992.
- Juhász, István. Kincses magyar filmtár 1931-1944: az eredeti forgatókönyvből 1931 és 1944 között létrejött hazai mozgóképekről. Kráter, 2007.
- Rîpeanu, Bujor. (ed.) International Directory of Cinematographers, Set- and Costume Designers in Film: Hungary (from the beginnings to 1988). Saur, 1981.
