= Semmelweis (1940 film) =

1940 film

- Directed by: André De Toth
- Written by: József Babay; László Bihari; László Kalmár; Vilmos Müller; Sándor Nagymihály
- Produced by: Miklós Szalontai Kiss
- Starring: Tivadar Uray; Gyula Gózon; Erzsi Simor
- Cinematography: István Eiben
- Edited by: Zoltán Kerényi
- Music by: Zoltán Pongrácz
- Production company: Mester Film
- Release date: 12 January 1940
- Running time: 85 minutes
- Country: Hungary
- Language: Hungarian

Semmelweis is a 1940 Hungarian biographical drama film directed by André De Toth and starring Tivadar Uray, Gyula Gózon and Erzsi Simor. It was shot at the Hunnia Studios in Budapest. The film's sets were designed by the art director Márton Vincze. It is based on the life of the pioneering nineteenth century doctor Ignaz Semmelweis. Later biopics include the 1950 East German film Dr. Semmelweis and the 1952 Hungarian Semmelweis.

== Cast ==
- Tivadar Uray as Semmelweis
- Juliska Ligeti as Mother of Semmelweis
- Gyula Gózon as Vater of Semmelweis
- Margit Árpád as Mária, Wife of Semmelweis
- Tivadar Bilicsi as Vili
- Erzsi Simor as Mici
- Artúr Somlay as Professor Rokitanszky
- Béla Mihályffi as Professor Klein
- István Szabó as Koletschka professzor
- Miklós Pataki as Professor Skoda
- József Juhász as Professor Hebra
- Lajos Vértes as Professor Markusovszky
- Lajos Boray as Baron Halpern
- Zoltán Makláry as Selectman
- Gusztáv Pártos as Barnum
- Margit Vágóné as Landlady

== Bibliography ==
- Juhász, István. Kincses magyar filmtár 1931–1944: az eredeti forgatókönyvből 1931 és 1944 között létrejött hazai mozgóképekről. Kráter, 2007.
- Ostrowska, Dorota, Pitassio, Francesco & Varga, Zsuzsanna. Popular Cinemas in East Central Europe: Film Cultures and Histories. Bloomsbury Publishing, 2017.
- Rîpeanu, Bujor. (ed.) International Directory of Cinematographers, Set- and Costume Designers in Film: Hungary (from the beginnings to 1988). Saur, 1981.
