= László Szilassy =

Hungarian actor

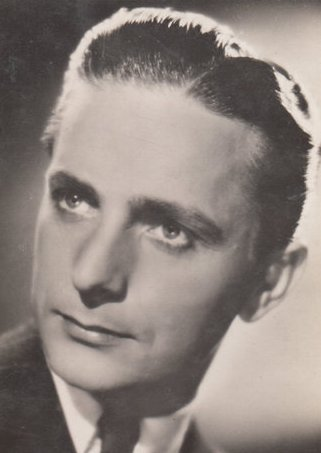
- Szilassy in 1942
- Born: 13 February 1908; Nyírcsászári, Austro-Hungarian Empire
- Died: 30 March 1972 (aged 64); São Paulo, Brazil
- Occupation: Actor
- Years active: 1938–1944 (film)

László Szilassy (February 13, 1908 – March 30, 1972) was a Hungarian film actor. Beginning his career on the stage, he emerged as a popular leading man in cinema during the late 1930s and appeared in more than 40 films by the end of the Second World War. He then emigrated to Brazil, also spending many years in Argentina where he continued to act in the theatre but no longer appeared on screen. Like many film figures of the Miklós Horthy era he was unwelcome in postwar Communist Hungary.

== Selected filmography ==
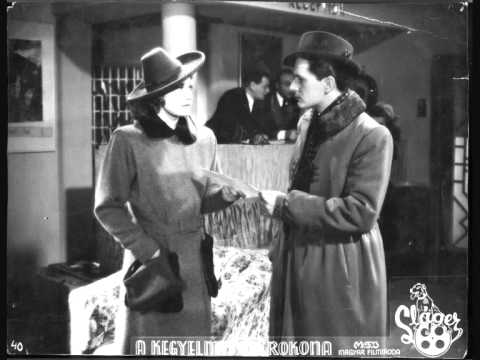
The Relative of His Excellency (1941) with Erzsi Simor.

- Bence Uz (1938)
- The Poor Rich (1938)
- Six Weeks of Happiness (1939)
- No Coincidence (1939)
- Cserebere (1940)
- Seven Plum Trees (1940)
- The Bercsenyi Hussars (1940)
- Matthew Arranges Things (1940)
- The Relative of His Excellency (1941)
- The Gyurkovics Boys (1941)
- Prince Bob (1941)
- Old Waltz (1941)
- Time of Trial (1942)
- The Talking Robe (1942)
- Kádár Versus Kerekes (1942)
- Borrowed Husbands (1942)
- Sirius (1942)
- Lóránd Fráter (1942)
- Annamária (1943)
- Wedding March (1944)
- Loving Hearts (1944)
- Knock on the Window (1944)
- Muki (1944)
- A Lover of the Theatre (1944)
- Strange Roads (1944)

== Bibliography ==
- Juhász, István. Kincses magyar filmtár 1931-1944: az eredeti forgatókönyvből 1931 és 1944 között létrejött hazai mozgóképekről. Kráter, 2007.
- Petrucci, Antonio. Twenty Years of Cinema in Venice. International Exhibition of Cinematographic Art, 1952.
