= Prince Bob (film) =

1941 film

- Directed by: László Kalmár
- Written by: Gyula Köváry; László Pacsery
- Based on: Prince Bob by Károly Bakonyi and Ferenc Martos
- Produced by: Mária Hausz
- Starring: László Szilassy; Erzsi Simor; Gábor Rajnay
- Cinematography: István Eiben
- Edited by: Zoltán Kerényi
- Music by: Szabolcs Fényes
- Production companies: Hausz Mária Filmkölcsönző; Hunnia Filmgyár
- Release date: 20 November 1941
- Running time: 98 minutes
- Country: Hungary
- Language: Hungarian

Prince Bob (Hungarian: Bob herceg) is a 1941 Hungarian historical musical film directed by László Kalmár and starring László Szilassy, Erzsi Simor and Gábor Rajnay. An operetta film, it is an adaptation of the 1902 operetta Prince Bob composed by Jenő Huszka. It was shot at the Hunnia Studios in Budapest. The film's sets were designed by the art director Imre Sőrés.

== Synopsis ==
Igor, the heir to a Grand Duchy, goes around incognito under the name Bob. He falls in love with Annie, a shopkeeper's daughter. He tries to prevent her being married off to one her debt-ridden mother's creditors.

== Cast ==
- László Szilassy as Igor - Luxoria hercege
- Erzsi Simor as Xénia Viktória hercegnõ
- Kató Kovács as Annie
- Mariska Vízváry as Nagyhercegnõ
- Gábor Rajnay as Pomponius magister
- Zoltán Makláry as Levendula Kajetán
- Zoltán Greguss as Félix - gárdakapitány
- Jenö Danis as Violin Péter Pál
- Tivadar Bilicsi as Ceremóniamester
- Pál Vessely as Karmester
- Lajos Kelemen as Bellania titkosügynöke
- György Nagyajtay as NárciszNéró, Xénia megbízottja
- Gusztáv Vándory as Miniszter
- Gyözö Kabók as Kerekszappan-fõzõ mester
- Edit Mészáros as Udvarhölgy
- Géza Berczy as Kapuõr
- Endre C. Turáni as Ifjú polgár
- István Falussy as Miniszter
- György Gozmány as Statiszta
- Erzsébet Medgyesy as Vendég a mézesboltban
- László Misoga as Bonifác
- Ila Nagy as Mosólány
- Iván Ruttkay as Borbélyinas
- Sándor Solymossy as Boldogságügyi miniszter
- Lajos Sugár as Bellaniai miniszter
- Lajos Ujváry as Harangozó
- Ferenc Antók as Kikiáltó
- György Hajnal as öreg halász
- Ferenc Pataki as Udvari hivatalnok
- Dezsõ Pártos as Céhmester
- Pál Zilahi as Plelykáló férfi

== Bibliography ==
- Balski, Grzegorz . Directory of Eastern European Film-makers and Films 1945-1991. Flicks Books, 1992.
- Juhász, István. Kincses magyar filmtár 1931-1944: az eredeti forgatókönyvből 1931 és 1944 között létrejött hazai mozgóképekről. Kráter, 2007.
- Rîpeanu, Bujor. (ed.) International Directory of Cinematographers, Set- and Costume Designers in Film: Hungary (from the beginnings to 1988). Saur, 1981.
