= Pál Veszely =

Hungarian actor

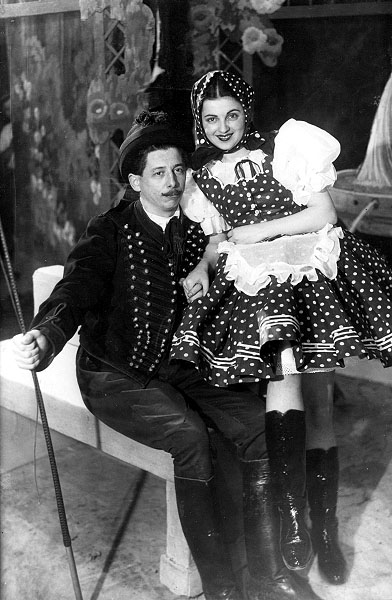
- Veszely with Ági Mészáros in 1939.
- Born: 27 April 1900; Pécs, Austro-Hungarian Empire
- Died: 1994 (aged 93–94); Delhi, Ontario, Canada
- Other name: Pál Vessely
- Occupation: Actor
- Years active: 1939–1945 (film)

Pál Veszely (1900–1994) was aa Hungarian stage and film actor. He was particularly active in cinema during the early 1940s, but his career was halted after the Second World War when he was accused of involvement with Hungary's wartime nationalist movement by the postwar Communist-dominated Hungary. He emigrated and settled in Canada.

== Selected filmography ==
- The Ball Is On (1939)
- Sarajevo (1940)
- Yes or No? (1940)
- The Chequered Coat (1940)
- Property for Sale (1941)
- Taken by the Flood (1941)
- Prince Bob (1941)
- Entry Forbidden (1941)
- Kádár Versus Kerekes (1942)
- The Marsh Flower (1943)
- A Plane Has Not Returned (1944)
- Wildfire (1944)
- After the Storm (1945)

== Bibliography ==
- Gál, Péter Molnár. A Latabárok: egy színészdinasztia a magyar színháztörténetben. Népművelési Propaganda Iroda, 1982.
- Laura, Ernesto G. Tutti i film di Venezia, 1932–1984. La Biennale, Settore cinema e spettacolo televisivo, 1985.
- Székely, György & Gajdó, Tamás. Magyar színháztörténet: 1920-1949. Akadémiai Kiadó, 1990.
