= Money Is Coming =

1939 film

- Directed by: Béla Balogh
- Written by: Jenõ Horváth; Iván Siklósi
- Produced by: Árpád Tasnády
- Starring: Romola Németh; Rudolf Somogyvári; Tivadar Bilicsi
- Cinematography: Rudolf Icsey
- Edited by: Viktor Bánky
- Music by: Anna Mihály
- Production company: Fono Film
- Distributed by: Atelier Film
- Release date: 20 July 1939
- Running time: 90 minutes
- Country: Hungary
- Language: Hungarian

Money Is Coming (Hungarian: Pénz áll a házhoz) is a 1939 Hungarian comedy film directed by Béla Balogh and starring Romola Németh, Rudolf Somogyvári and Tivadar Bilicsi. It was shot at the Hunnia Studios in Budapest. The film's sets were designed by the art director József Simoncsics.

== Synopsis ==
Lajos is employed at a travel agency and is love with Maria, but after losing his job his friends pretend that he has inherited a fortune from a wealthy relative in Argentina in order to try and help him.

== Cast ==
- Romola Németh as Végpusztai Varga Mária, avagy Csibi
- Rudolf Somogyvári as Molnár Lajos
- Tivadar Bilicsi as Borsa Tóbiás, vegyészmérnök és feltaláló, Lajos barátja
- Géza Berczy as Dezsö, Lajos barátja
- Kálmán Latabár as Ficek Benõ, táncmûvész
- Piroska Vaszary as Rosalie, Dezsõ egykori partnere
- Sári Déry as Énekesnõ
- Béla Fáy as Horváth Ádám, a Tata Utazási Iroda igazgatója
- Manyi Kiss as Zöld Mici, táncosnõ
- Lajos Bazsay as Megyeri, Molnár utódja
- Ilona Bánhidy as Demeterné, Júlia
- Irma Cserei as Decsiék szakácsnõje
- Anni Eisen as Vendég az eljegyzésen
- Irén Erdész as Decsiné
- István Falussy as Vendég az eljegyzésen
- László Földényi as Demeter Károly, marhatenyésztõ
- Ferenc Galetta as Szállodaigazgató
- György Hajnal as János bácsi, a TURA alkalmazottja
- Gyula Kompóthy as Jenõ, nászutas férj
- Terus Kováts as A sokgyermekes rokon felesége
- Ilona Kökény as Vendég az eljegyzésen
- Gyula Köváry as Pali bácsi
- Tihamér Lázár as Szállodaportás
- László Misoga as Röser Bonifác, bankár
- Erzsi Orsolya as Nászutas feleség
- Melinda Ottrubay as Kádár Vilma, balettprimadonna
- Ferenc Pataki as Rikkancs
- Ferenc Pethes as Inas
- Sándor Pethes as Röser Pongrácz, bankár
- Dániel Skultéty as Vendég az eljegyzésen
- Lajos Sugár as Lajos sokgyerekes rokona
- Ferenc Szabó as Londíner
- Kató Timár as Decsiék szobalánya
- József Tóth-Vásárhelyi as Aszfaltbetyár
- Éva Örkényi as Pötyi, Molnárék kislánya

== Bibliography ==
- Juhász, István. Kincses magyar filmtár 1931-1944: az eredeti forgatókönyvből 1931 és 1944 között létrejött hazai mozgóképekről. Kráter, 2007.
- Rîpeanu, Bujor. (ed.) International Directory of Cinematographers, Set- and Costume Designers in Film: Hungary (from the beginnings to 1988). Saur, 1981.
