= Strange Roads =

1944 film

- Directed by: Imre Apáthi
- Written by: Miklós Asztalos; Pál Barabás; Margit Kopácsy
- Produced by: Nándor Jenes
- Starring: Klári Tolnay; László Szilassy; Géza Abonyi
- Cinematography: Barnabás Hegyi
- Music by: Ottó Vincze
- Production company: Iris Film
- Release date: 1 June 1944
- Running time: 88 minutes
- Country: Hungary
- Language: Hungarian

Strange Roads (Hungarian: Idegen utakon) is a 1944 Hungarian drama film directed by Imre Apáthi and starring Klári Tolnay, László Szilassy and Géza Abonyi. It was shot at the Hunnia Studios in Budapest. The film's sets were designed by the art director István Básthy.

== Cast ==
- Klári Tolnay as Máté Judit
- László Szilassy as Péter
- Géza Abonyi as Bálint professzor
- Béla Mihályffi as Géza, Mimi férje
- Mária Sulyok as Mimi
- Tusi Buday as Nõvér
- Ágnes Almássy as Nõvér
- Rózsi Bordás as Növér
- Zoltán Losonczy as Postás
- Béla Fáy as Márton, a szanatórium vezetõ orvosa
- Mariska Halassy as Judit anyja
- Elemér Bánky
- Róbert Bánky
- Márta Fónay
- Mici Haraszti
- Hanna Landy
- István Lontay

== Bibliography ==
- Juhász, István. Kincses magyar filmtár 1931–1944: az eredeti forgatókönyvből 1931 és 1944 között létrejött hazai mozgóképekről. Kráter, 2007.
- Rîpeanu, Bujor. (ed.) International Directory of Cinematographers, Set- and Costume Designers in Film: Hungary (from the beginnings to 1988). Saur, 1981.
