= Klári Tolnay =

Hungarian actress (1914–1998)

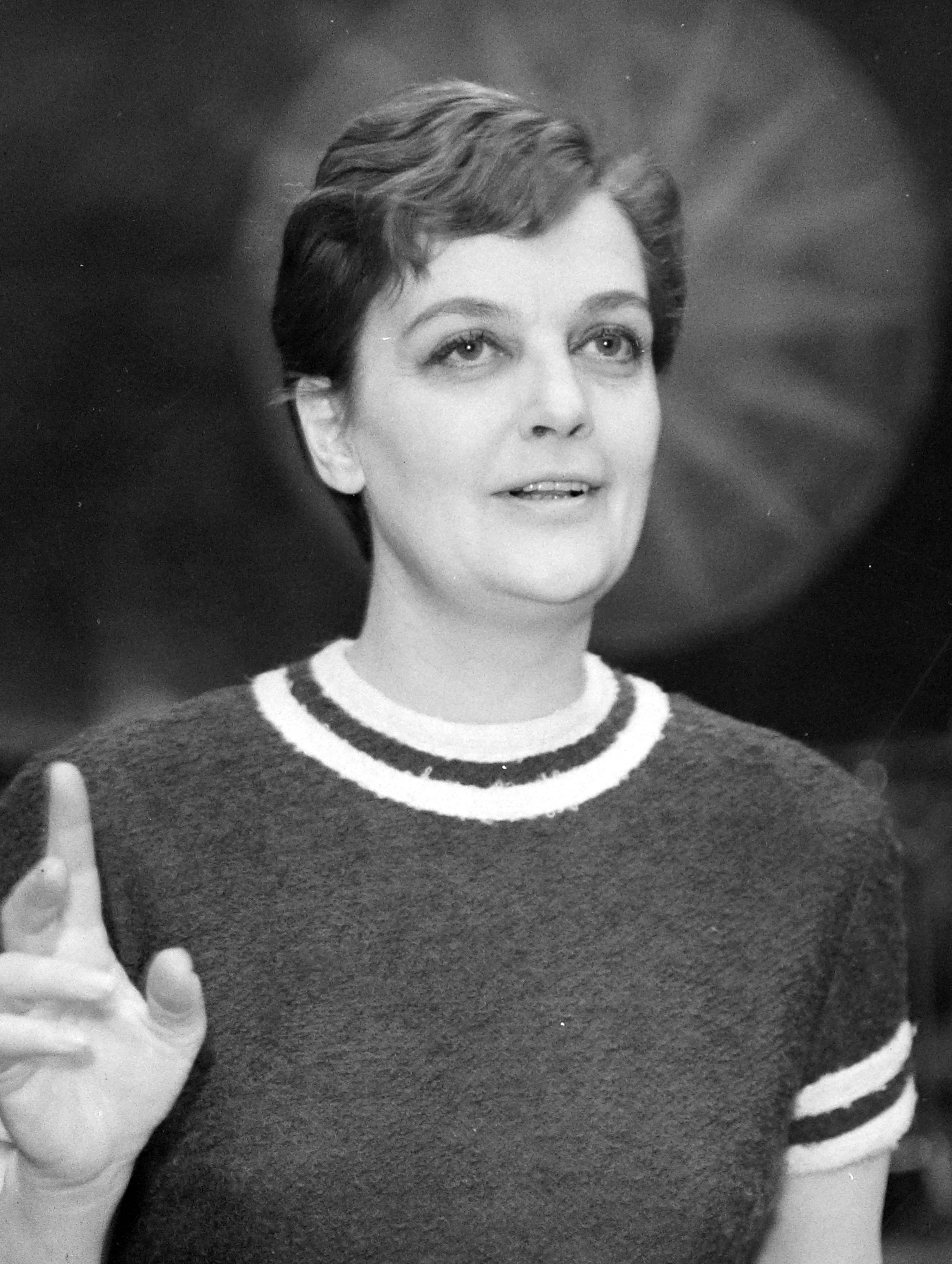
- Born: Rozália Klára Tolnay; 27 July 1914; Budapest, Austria-Hungary (now Hungary)
- Died: 27 October 1998 (aged 84); Budapest, Hungary
- Occupation: Actress
- Years active: 1934–1998
- Spouse(s): Ákos Ráthonyi; Iván Darvas
- Children: Zsuzsanna Ráthonyi

Klári Tolnay (born Rozália Klára Tolnay; 17 July 1914 – 27 October 1998) was a Hungarian actress. She received the Kossuth Prize in 1951 and 1952.

== Life ==
Klári Tolnay (born Rózsi Tolnay) was born on 17 July 1914 in Budapest, the daughter of István Tolnay and Eleonóra Siess. She spent her childhood in the small village of Mohora, Nógrád County, on the estate of her father. Finishing elementary school there, she continued secondary school studies in Balassagyarmat, two years at the school operated by Institutum Beatae Mariae Virginis in Nyíregyháza, finishing high school in Debrecen's School of Business. Singing and playing music since childhood, she followed the advice of newspaper editor János Bókay, and auditioned herself to prominent actors of the time, Gábor Rajnai, Jenő Heltai, and Sándor Hevesi. After these early attempts were not followed by desired results, she was mentored by Béla Gaál, thus starting her career as a film actress at the Hunnia Film Studio.

Her first notable role was in Meseautó, after which she was hired by the Comedy Theatre of Budapest theatre in 1934, to perform smaller roles. In 1936 she married Ákos Ráthonyi, a director, giving birth to daughter Zsuzsanna 4 years later. After World War II ended in 1945, Ákos Ráthonyi left Hungary, with their daughter following after the 1956 revolution. Leaving the Comedy Theatre for the Művész Theatre in 1946-7, she met Iván Darvas, whom she later married (but divorced in 1958). In 1947, together with Gyula Benkő and István Somló, she was appointed as the co-manager of the Comedy Theatre, where she was a major participant in restoring the institution to its pre-war glory. After the theatre was disbanded by the government in 1950, she joined the Madách Theatre, where she worked until her death on 27 October 1998. In later years, she also became a much sought-after dubbing actress, lending her voice to a great number of elderly female characters.

== Filmography ==
- Hacsek és Sajő – A két ültetvényes (1934, short)
- The New Relative (1934)
- The Dream Car (1934)
- Lila akác (1934)
- The Wise Mother (1935)
- Be True Until Death (1936)
- There Are Exceptions (1937)
- My Daughter Is Different (1937)
- The Borrowed Castle (1937)
- Magda Expelled (1938)
- Döntő pillanat (1938)
- Azurexpressz (1938)
- The Lady Is a Bit Cracked (1938)
- Flower of the Tisza (1938)
- Wildflowers of Gyimes (1939)
- Istvan Bors (1939)
- Wedding in Toprin (1939)
- Six Weeks of Happiness (1939)
- A nőnek mindig sikerül (1939)
- The Unquiet Night (1940)
- Queen Elizabeth (1940)
- Egy csók és más semmi (1940)
- Mirage by the Lake (1940)
- Vissza az úton (1940)
- A szerelem nem szégyen (1940)
- Havasi napsütés (1941)
- Silent Monastery (1941)
- Three Bells (1941)
- The Devil Doesn't Sleep (1941)
- 1941 Gentryfészek (1941)
- Kádár Versus Kerekes (1942)
- Male Fidelity (1942)
- At the Crossroads (1942)
- Pista tekintetes úr (1942)
- Katyi (1942)
- Szerencsés flótás (1943)
- Palócvirág (short) (1943)
- Féltékenység (1943)
- Menekülő ember (1943)
- The Song of Rákóczi (1943)
- Ágrólszakadt úrilány
- Strange Roads (1944)
- Renee XIV (1946)
- The Siege of Beszterce (1948)
- Tűz (1948)
- A Woman Gets a Start (1949)
- Déryné (1951)
- Relatives (1954)
- Ünnepi vacsora (1956)
- Tale on the Twelve Points (1957)
- Dani (1957)
- Danse Macabre (1958)
- What a Night! (1958)
- For Whom the Larks Sing (1959)
- Fűre lépni szabad (1960)
- Virrad (1960)
- Mindenki ártatlan? (1961)
- Nem ér a nevem (1961)
- Land of Angels (1962)
- Fagyosszentek (1962)
- Drama of the Lark (1963)
- Fáklyaláng (TV film) (1963)
- Hogy állunk, fiatalember? (1963)
- Ők tudják, mi a szerelem (TV film) (1964)
- Ezer év (1964)
- Father (1964)
- Utószezon (1966)
- The Testament of Aga Koppanyi (1967)
- Az özvegy és a százados (1967)
- Családi tűzhely (TV film) (1968)
- Elsietett házasság (1968)
- Hatholdas rózsakert (1970)
- Szemtől szemben (1970)
- Franz Liszt. Dreams of love (1970)
- 1971 A Danaida (TV film)
- 1971 Reménykedők
- 1972 Jó estét nyár, jó estét szerelem
- 1972 Volt egyszer egy család
- 1975 Asszony a viharban (TV film)
- 1975 Hogyan viseljük el szerelmi bánatunkat? (TV film)
- 1976 Ballagó idő
- 1976 Fekete gyémántok
- 1976 Mélosz pusztulása (TV film)
- 1978 Drága kisfiam
- 1978 Legato
- 1978 Nem élhetek muzsikaszó nélkül
- 1980 Kojak Budapesten
- 1983 A csoda vége
- 1983 Ők tudják, mi a szerelem (TV film)
- 1983 Reumavalcer (TV film)
- 1984 A vörös grófnő
- 1985 The Red Countess
- 1985 Bevégezetlen ragozás (TV film)
- 1989 Vili, a veréb (voice)
- 1994 Drága kisfiam

== Sources ==
- László, Párkány. Tolnay Klári : egyes szám első személyben. Budapest:Minerva, 1998. ISBN 978-963-223-429-8
- Zsolt, Kőháti. Tolnay Klári. Budapest: Múzsák Közművelődési Kiadó, 1987. OCLC 20613628
- – Kláry Tolnay in the Hungarian Theatrical Lexicon (György, Székely. Magyar Színházművészeti Lexikon. Budapest: Akadémiai Kiadó, 1994. ISBN 978-963-05-6635-3), freely available on mek.oszk.hu
