= Matthew Arranges Things =

1940 film

- Directed by: Frigyes Bán
- Written by: Margit Pusztaszeri
- Produced by: István Erdélyi
- Starring: Gerö Mály; Margit Lukács; Lili Berky
- Cinematography: Rudolf Icsey; István Somkúti
- Edited by: László Katonka
- Music by: István Máté
- Production company: Kárpát Film
- Release date: 6 February 1940
- Running time: 81 minutes
- Country: Hungary
- Language: Hungarian

Matthew Arranges Things (Hungarian: Mátyás rendet csinál) is a 1940 Hungarian comedy film directed by Frigyes Bán and starring Gerö Mály, Margit Lukács and Lili Berky. It was shot at the Hunnia Studios in Budapest. The film's sets were designed by the art director Klára B. Kokas.

== Cast ==
- Gerö Mály as Mátyás, a portás
- Margit Lukács as Éva, Bálintné lánya
- Lili Berky as Özvegy Bálintné
- László Szilassy as Tom Taylor
- Mici Erdélyi as Mary, Tom menyasszonya
- Nándor Bihary as Bokor Boldizsár, bankár
- Kamill Feleki as Gyuri, hölgyfodrász
- Gyula Köváry as Feltaláló
- László Misoga as Béla, háziszolga
- Emmi Nagy as Mici
- Éva Adorján as A szép vendég
- György Nagyajtay as János, Bálintné fia
- Romola Németh as Panni, János menyasszonya
- Viola Orbán as Jozefin
- Sándor Solymossy as Feri, pincér
- Margit Szathmáry as Antalné
- András Tassy as Antal
- Kató Timár as Tusi, manikûrösnõ

== Bibliography ==
- Balski, Grzegorz. Directory of Eastern European Film-makers and Films 1945-1991. Flicks Books, 1992.
- Juhász, István. Kincses magyar filmtár 1931-1944: az eredeti forgatókönyvből 1931 és 1944 között létrejött hazai mozgóképekről. Kráter, 2007.
- Rîpeanu, Bujor. (ed.) International Directory of Cinematographers, Set- and Costume Designers in Film: Hungary (from the beginnings to 1988). Saur, 1981.
