= Károly Kovács (actor) =

Hungarian actor (1902–1990)

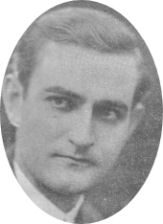
- Kovács in 1929
- Born: 19 January 1902; Mezőszilas, Austro-Hungarian Empire
- Died: 10 December 1990 (aged 88); Budapest, Hungary
- Occupation: Actor
- Years active: 1938–1983 (film & TV)

Károly Kovács (1902–1990) was a Hungarian stage, film and television actor. He was married to the actresses Margit Dajka and Erzsi Simor. With the latter he starred in the 1943 wartime Italian film Two Hearts.

== Selected filmography ==
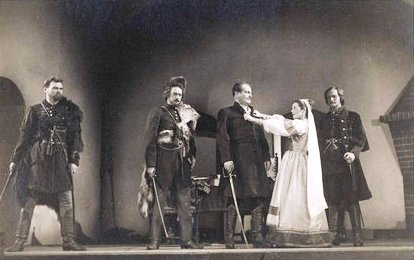
Kovács onstage with Erzsi Somogyi, Lajos Rajczy and other cast members.

- Barbara in America (1938)
- The Wrong Man (1938)
- Hungary's Revival (1939)
- Six Weeks of Happiness (1939)
- Two Girls on the Street (1939)
- Money Talks (1940)
- Together (1943)
- Two Hearts (1943)
- The Song of Rákóczi (1943)
- A Plane Has Not Returned (1944)
- Semmelweis (1952)
- West Zone (1952)
- Fourteen Lives (1954)
- Édes Anna (1958)
- The Poor Rich (1959)
- Be True Until Death (1960)
- Young Noszty and Mary Toth (1960)
- The Man of Gold (1962)
- Twenty Hours (1965)
- Budapest Tales (1976)

== Bibliography ==
- Fekete, Márton. Prominent Hungarians: Home and Abroad. Szepsi Csombor Literary Circle, 1979.
- Székely, György & Gajdó, Tamás. Magyar színháztörténet: 1920-1949. Akadémiai Kiadó, 1990.
