= A Lover of the Theatre =

1944 film

- Directed by: Emil Martonffi
- Written by: András Dékány; László Hodinka
- Starring: Mária Egry; László Szilassy; Tibor Halmay
- Cinematography: Ferenc Fekete
- Edited by: Imre Füredi
- Music by: Ernõ Kiss Angyal
- Production company: Auróra Film
- Release date: 10 August 1944
- Country: Hungary
- Language: Hungarian

A Lover of the Theatre (Hungarian: A színház szerelmese) is a 1944 Hungarian drama film directed by Emil Martonffi and starring Mária Egry, László Szilassy and Tibor Halmay. It was shot at the Hunnia Studios in Budapest and on location in Transylvania. The film's sets were designed by the art director Mátyás Varga.

== Cast ==
- Mária Egry as Éva / Torday Klára
- László Szilassy as Benedek Máté
- Tibor Halmay as Csongor Dániel, az öreg tanár
- Sándor Tompa as Szuvics János, a borbély
- Béla Mihályffi as Színigazgató
- Jolán Páka as Operaénekes
- Cia Jatzkó as Szuvics felesége

== Bibliography ==
- Cunningham, John. Hungarian Cinema: From Coffee House to Multiplex. Wallflower Press, 2004.
- Juhász, István. Kincses magyar filmtár 1931-1944: az eredeti forgatókönyvből 1931 és 1944 között létrejött hazai mozgóképekről. Kráter, 2007.
- Rîpeanu, Bujor. (ed.) International Directory of Cinematographers, Set- and Costume Designers in Film: Hungary (from the beginnings to 1988). Saur, 1981.
