= The Talking Robe =

1942 film

- Directed by: Géza von Radványi
- Written by: Károly Nóti; Ágoston Pacséry; Géza Palásthy; Miklós Asztalos
- Based on: The Talking Robe by Kálmán Mikszáth
- Produced by: Jenõ Katona
- Starring: Pál Jávor; Maria von Tasnady; László Szilassy
- Cinematography: Barnabás Hegyi
- Edited by: László Katonka
- Music by: Ottó Vincze
- Production company: Erdélyi Filmgyártó
- Distributed by: Titanus
- Release date: 21 February 1942
- Running time: 89 minutes
- Country: Hungary
- Language: Hungarian

The Talking Robe (Hungarian: A beszélő köntös) is a 1942 Hungarian historical fantasy adventure film directed by Géza von Radványi and starring Pál Jávor, Maria von Tasnady and László Szilassy. It was based on Kálmán Mikszáth's 1889 novel of the same title. It was shot partially in colour at the Hunnia Studios in Budapest. The film's sets were designed by the art directors István Básthy and Sándor Iliszi. It was the first Hungarian film with outdoor scenes utilising Agfacolor colour technology. It was distributed in Italy, Hungary's wartime ally, by Titanus. It was later remade as a 1969 film of the same name.

== Cast ==
- Pál Jávor as Mihály Lestyák Junior
- Maria von Tasnady as Cinna
- Ferenc Kiss as Mihály Lestyák
- László Szilassy as Mehmed II
- Gyula Csortos as Pasha of Buda
- Tivadar Bilicsi as Putnoky
- Béla Mihályffi as Ágoston
- Árpád Lehotay as Mihály Szűcs Mihály, judge
- József Bihari as Pintyő
- Sándor Tompa as Máté Puszta
- Erzsi Orsolya as Sára, Gipsy lady
- József Juhász as Bey Olaj
- György Kürthy as Porosznoki
- Piri Vaszary as Mrs Fábián
- Jenö Danis as Cselebi Mollah
- Nándor Bihary as Fõeunuch

== Bibliography ==
- Bolton, Lucy & Wright, Julie Lobalzo (ed.) Lasting Screen Stars: Images that Fade and Personas that Endure. Springer, 2016.
- Somlyódy, László & Somlyódy, Nóra. Hungarian Arts and Sciences: 1848-2000. Social Science Monographs, 2003.

== Sources ==
- Port.hu
- The Talking Robe at IMDb
