= At the Crossroads (1942 film) =

1942 film

- Directed by: Viktor Bánky
- Written by: Sándor Dallos; Pál Vári
- Based on: At the Crossroads by Leontin Szili
- Produced by: Miklós Palugyai
- Starring: Klári Tolnay; Andor Ajtay; Vera Sennyei
- Cinematography: Rudolf Icsey
- Edited by: Zoltán Kerényi
- Music by: Béla Malcsiner
- Production company: Hunnia Filmgyár
- Release date: 1942
- Running time: 90 minutes
- Country: Hungary
- Language: Hungarian

At the Crossroads (Hungarian: Keresztúton) is a 1942 Hungarian drama film directed by Viktor Bánky and starring Klári Tolnay, Andor Ajtay and Vera Sennyei. It was shot at the Hunnia Studios in Budapest. The film's sets were designed by the art director József Simoncsics.

== Synopsis ==
Raised in difficult circumstances, a young woman turns to her prosperous uncle to secure her a job as a typist. However, at her uncle's house she meets and falls in love with her cousin's fiancee.

== Cast ==
- Klári Tolnay as Edit
- Margit Ladomerszky as Mohher
- Vera Sennyei as Irma
- Erzsi Orsolya as Mrs. Barta
- László Perényi as Guszti
- Andor Ajtay as Nedeczky
- Artúr Somlay as Attornay
- Imre Toronyi as Professzor
- Karola Zala as Klementin, relative of family Attovay
- Béla Vizi as Dr. Attovay Tamás
- Kató Donáth as Archivist at the bank
- Anni Eisen as Guest at family Attovay
- István Falussy as Innkeeper in Transylvania
- Gyula Ignáth as Marcell, manager
- Angela Christian as Nedeczky Marika

== Bibliography ==
- Juhász, István. Kincses magyar filmtár 1931-1944: az eredeti forgatókönyvből 1931 és 1944 között létrejött hazai mozgóképekről. Kráter, 2007.
- Rîpeanu, Bujor. (ed.) International Directory of Cinematographers, Set- and Costume Designers in Film: Hungary (from the beginnings to 1988). Saur, 1981.
