= Muki (film) =

1944 film

- Directed by: Ákos Ráthonyi
- Written by: Adorján Bónyi (novel); Lajos Pánczél
- Produced by: Péter Bajusz; Géza Lipót Zichy
- Starring: Ida Turay; László Szilassy; Irén Pelsöczy
- Cinematography: Rudolf Icsey
- Edited by: Vera Besztercei
- Music by: Pál Lörinczy
- Production company: Mûvelõdés Film
- Release date: 9 February 1944
- Running time: 83 minutes
- Country: Hungary
- Language: Hungarian

Muki is a 1944 Hungarian comedy film directed by Ákos Ráthonyi and starring Ida Turay, László Szilassy and Irén Pelsöczy. It was shot at the Hunnia Studios in Budapest. The film's sets were designed by the art director József Simoncsics.

== Cast ==
- Ida Turay as Bagamér Lili
- László Szilassy as Péter, Hársy fia
- Irén Pelsöczy as Kéky Mária
- Gyula Csortos as Hársy Tamás
- Kálmán Latabár as Autóügynök
- Andor Sárossy as Benzinkútkezelõ
- Lili Berky
- Nándor Bihary
- György Hajnal
- Gyula Szabó
- István Lontay
- Ida Major
- Ibolya Orbán
- Klára Pápai

== Bibliography ==
- Juhász, István. Kincses magyar filmtár 1931–1944: az eredeti forgatókönyvből 1931 és 1944 között létrejött hazai mozgóképekről. Kráter, 2007.
- Rîpeanu, Bujor. (ed.) International Directory of Cinematographers, Set- and Costume Designers in Film: Hungary (from the beginnings to 1988). Saur, 1981.
