= The Chequered Coat =

1940 film

- Directed by: Emil Martonffi
- Written by: László Segesdy; László Szilágyi
- Produced by: László Sipos; József Vass
- Starring: Kálmán Latabár; Manyi Kiss; Zoltán Makláry
- Cinematography: Barnabás Hegyi
- Edited by: László Katonka
- Music by: Andor Zerinváry
- Production company: Hunnia Filmgyár
- Release date: 21 November 1940
- Running time: 85 minutes
- Country: Hungary
- Language: Hungarian

The Chequered Coat (Hungarian: Pepita kabát) is a 1940 Hungarian comedy film directed by Emil Martonffi and starring Kálmán Latabár, Manyi Kiss and Zoltán Makláry. It was shot at the Hunnia Studios in Budapest. The film's sets were designed by the art director István Básthy.

== Synopsis ==
A postmistress wants to marry off her daughters, but one of them Teri takes her dowry sewn into a coat and journeys to Budapest to buy a boarding house. One of the guests, a composer, falls in love with her and tries to prevent her being cheated in the city.

== Cast ==
- Kálmán Latabár as Laczffy, táncoskomikus
- Manyi Kiss as Zsuzsa, Teri testvére
- Zoltán Makláry as Végrehajtó
- Mária Egry as Teri
- Géza Földessy as Szepesy János
- Lili Berky as Özvegy Takácsné, Teri anyja
- Béla Mihályffi as Zenekiadó
- Piroska Vaszary as Ráczné, panziótulajdonos
- Ferenc Pethes asJános, zeneszerzõ
- Pál Vessely as Ödön
- Ilona Kiszely as Juci, énekesnõ
- Árpád Latabár as Színigazgató
- Livia Kollár as Komorna
- Anci Barna as Sötéthné, színésznõ
- Géza Berczy as Színész
- Dóra Fáy Kiss as Egyik pepitakabátos lány
- Livia Miklós as Pepita kabátos lány
- Ibolya Orbán as Margit, ruhatáros
- Tibor Puskás as Boy
- Teri Radó as Margit, ruhatáros
- Sándor Solymossy as Nemes úr, vendég a panzióban
- Mária Szemlér as Pénztáros kisasszony
- Rózsi Szerdahelyi as Feleség a panzióban
- Gyula Szöreghy as Férfi a postán
- Gyula Köváry
- Ilona Kökény

== Bibliography ==
- Juhász, István. Kincses magyar filmtár 1931–1944: az eredeti forgatókönyvből 1931 és 1944 között létrejött hazai mozgóképekről. Kráter, 2007.
- Rîpeanu, Bujor. (ed.) International Directory of Cinematographers, Set- and Costume Designers in Film: Hungary (from the beginnings to 1988). Saur, 1981.
