= Háry János (1941 film) =

- Directed by: Frigyes Bán
- Written by: Zsolt Harsányi; Béla Paulini
- Produced by: Antal Güttler
- Starring: Antal Páger; Margit Dajka; Kató Bárczy; Zoltán Makláry
- Cinematography: Árpád Makay
- Edited by: László Katonka
- Music by: Zoltán Kodály
- Production company: Palatinus Filmterjesztõ Vállalat
- Release date: 25 September 1941
- Running time: 90 minutes
- Country: Hungary
- Language: Hungarian

Háry János is a 1941 Hungarian musical film directed by Frigyes Bán and starring Antal Páger, Margit Dajka and Kató Bárczy. It is based on the folk opera Háry János which was made into a later film in 1965.

== Cast ==
- Antal Páger - Háry János
- Margit Dajka - Örzse
- Kató Bárczy - Mária Lujza
- Zoltán Makláry - Ferenc császár
- Vilma Medgyaszay - Császárné
- Sándor Pethes - Ebelasztin lovag
- József Juhász - Marci bácsi
- Judit Csermely -Udvarhölgy
- Mária Deésy - Udvarhölgy
- Lajos Kelemen - Muszka határõr
- Ernö Mihályi - Napóleon
- László Misoga - Hírnök
- Sándor Naszódy - Diák
- István Palotai - Katona
- Ferenc Pethes - Silbak
- György Solthy - Magyar határõr
- Gyula Szőreghy - Tábornok
