= Kádár Versus Kerekes =

1942 film

- Directed by: Ákos Ráthonyi
- Written by: Miklós Asztalos
- Produced by: Miklós Szalontai Kiss
- Starring: Klári Tolnay; László Szilassy; Gerö Mály
- Cinematography: Árpád Makay
- Edited by: Zoltán Kerényi
- Music by: Aladár Majorossy
- Production company: Objektív Film
- Release date: 20 April 1942
- Running time: 85 minutes
- Country: Hungary
- Language: Hungarian

Kádár Versus Kerekes (Hungarian: Kádár kontra Kerekes) is a 1942 Hungarian comedy film directed by Ákos Ráthonyi and starring Klári Tolnay, László Szilassy and Gerö Mály. It was shot at the Hunnia Studios in Budapest. The film's sets were designed by the art director József Simoncsics.

== Synopsis ==
Péter Kerekes inherits an impoverished country estate which he tries to keep hold of with the assistance of the loyal family butler Gábor. One day Péter meets the attractive Erzsi Kádár and falls in love with her, not realising that she is a lawyer working to seize the estate to cover his debts.

== Cast ==
- Klári Tolnay as Kádár Erzsi ügyvéd
- László Szilassy as Kerekes Péter
- Gerö Mály as Kontra Gábor
- Piroska Vaszary as Vidáné
- Lajos Köpeczi Boócz as Nagy Géza, ügyvéd
- Zoltán Makláry as Ferenc Géza, ideggyógyász
- Sándor Pethes as Boldizsár János, ideggyógyász
- Árpád Latabár as Olajcég elnöke
- László Misoga as Perczel István, acélipari cég igazgatója
- Nándor Bihary as Kádár Marci
- Lajos Ujváry as Zálogházi becsüs
- Géza Berczy as Simonyi János
- László Acsay as Pincér
- Rezsõ Acsay as Bárpincér
- Anni Eisen as Divatszalonosnõ
- István Falussy as Iparmágnás
- Ilona Kökény as úrvezetõ felesége
- Gyula Köváry as úrvezetõ
- Tihamér Lázár as Pincér
- Erzsébet Nádudvary as vendég az Ötórai Tea bárban, Kerkes táncpatnere
- Ferenc Pataki as Pincér
- Dezsõ Pártos as Klubtag
- Ferenc Szabó as Pincér
- Gyula Szöreghy as Képárus
- Pál Vessely as Szabó
- Gusztáv Vándory as Rendõrtanácsos

== Bibliography ==
- Juhász, István. Kincses magyar filmtár 1931–1944: az eredeti forgatókönyvből 1931 és 1944 között létrejött hazai mozgóképekről. Kráter, 2007.
- Rîpeanu, Bujor. (ed.) International Directory of Cinematographers, Set- and Costume Designers in Film: Hungary (from the beginnings to 1988). Saur, 1981.
