= No Coincidence (film) =

1939 film

- Directed by: László Kalmár
- Written by: Endre Solt (play); István Békeffy
- Produced by: Miklós Szalontai Kiss
- Starring: Ida Turay; László Szilassy; József Juhász
- Cinematography: Károly Vass
- Music by: Ernõ Kiss Angyal
- Production companies: Hunnia Filmstúdió; Magyar Studios
- Release date: 9 February 1939
- Running time: 88 minutes
- Country: Hungary
- Language: Hungarian

No Coincidence (Hungarian: Nincsenek véletlenek) is a 1939 Hungarian comedy film directed by László Kalmár and starring Ida Turay, László Szilassy and József Juhász. It was shot at the Hunnia Studios in Budapest. The film's sets were designed by the art director Márton Vincze.

== Synopsis ==
A newly married couple of their honeymoon stop in a hotel for the night. They discover amongst their wedding presents is a message thanking the wife for "past happiness", angering the husband who wrongly believes that his wife has an unknown past.

== Cast ==
- Ida Turay as Ács Klári, Simkó felesége
- László Szilassy as Pali, Pataky fia
- József Juhász as Simkó Alajos
- Blanka Szombathelyi as Zita, Fürediné lánya
- Margit Árpád as Böske, vendég az álarcosbálon
- Sándor Tompa as Taxisofõr
- Béla Mihályffi as Pataky Benedek
- János Balassa as Operettszínház titkára
- Lajos Boray as Gizi kérõje
- Irma Cserei as Vendég a szállodában
- Mihály Dávid as Attasé
- Anni Eisen as Vendég az álarcosbálon
- Béla Fáy as Lakáj
- Hilda Gobbi as Szerencsiné
- Károly Hajagos as Vendég az esküvõn
- Mici Haraszti as Vendég az esküvõn
- Ilona Kiszely as Váry Gizella operettprimadonna
- Ilona Kökény as Füredy Nagyné
- Gyula Köváry as Szerencsi Ádám ékszerész
- István Lontay as Komornyik
- Ida Major as Dizõz
- Géza Márky as Pincér az álarcosbálon
- Ferenc Pethes as Szobapincér
- László Pálóczi as Kemény Tamás zeneszerzõ
- Dezsõ Pártos as Vendég az esküvõn
- Géza Rónai as Vendég az álarcosbálon
- Dániel Skultéty as Vendég az álarcosbálon
- Sándor Solymossy as Házmester
- Dezsö Szalóky as Vendég az esküvön
- József Vándor as Liftboy
- Margit Vándory as Mari, cselédlány az ékszerésznél

== Bibliography ==
- Juhász, István. Kincses magyar filmtár 1931-1944: az eredeti forgatókönyvből 1931 és 1944 között létrejött hazai mozgóképekről. Kráter, 2007.
- Rîpeanu, Bujor. (ed.) International Directory of Cinematographers, Set- and Costume Designers in Film: Hungary (from the beginnings to 1988). Saur, 1981.
