= József Simoncsics =

Hungarian art director

- Born: 26 September 1908; Késmárk, Austria-Hungary
- Died: 29 October 1992 (aged 84); Budapest, Hungary
- Occupation: Art director
- Years active: 1939–1944 (film)

József Simoncsics (1908–1992) was a Hungarian art director. He designed the film sets for a number of Hungarian productions during the 1930s and 1940s while based at the Hunnia Studios in Budapest.

== Selected filmography ==
- Istvan Bors (1939)
- Hello, Peter! (1939)
- Deadly Spring (1939)
- Money Is Coming (1939)
- Cadet Love (1939)
- The Last of the Vereczkeys (1940)
- You Are the Song (1940)
- At the Crossroads (1942)
- Katyi (1942)
- Kádár Versus Kerekes (1942)
- Borrowed Husbands (1942)
- Lóránd Fráter (1942)
- Happy Times (1943)
- Machita (1944)
- African Bride (1944)
- Muki (1944)
- Eva Szovathy (1944)

== Bibliography ==
- Mitchell, Charles P. The Great Composers Portrayed on Film, 1913 through 2002. McFarland, 2004.
- Rîpeanu, Bujor. (ed.) International Directory of Cinematographers, Set- and Costume Designers in Film: Hungary (from the beginnings to 1988). Saur, 1981.
