= Marika (film) =

1938 film

- Directed by: Viktor Gertler
- Written by: István Zágon (play); Armand Szántó; Mihály Szécsén
- Produced by: János Smolka
- Starring: Pál Jávor; Lia Szepes; Zita Perczel; József Juhász
- Cinematography: István Eiben
- Music by: József Radó
- Production company: Budapest Film
- Release date: 11 February 1938
- Running time: 80 minutes
- Country: Hungary
- Language: Hungarian

Marika is a 1938 Hungarian comedy drama film directed by Viktor Gertler and starring Pál Jávor, Lia Szepes and Zita Perczel. The film is based on a play by István Zágon, which was later adapted as the German film Marili. The sets were designed by the art director Márton Vincze

The film is sometimes referred to in English as Little Mary.

== Synopsis ==
After his wife dies, Orbán Sándor adopts his stepdaughter Marika. However, once she grows into a woman she falls in love with him.

== Cast ==
- Pál Jávor as Orbán Sándor
- Lia Szepes as Marika
- Zita Perczel as Ella
- József Juhász as Karády
- Lidia Beöthy as Ella barátnõje
- Zoltán Hosszú as János, komornyik
- Béla Mihályffi as Színházigazgató
- Ferenc Pethes as Tóni
- Lajos Köpeczi Boócz as Kerényi, színiigazgató
- István Falussy as Színész
- Gusztáv Harasztos as Színházi szakember
- Rezsö Harsányi as Gróf Kápolnay
- Valéria Hidvéghy as Szobalány
- Aladár Sarkadi
- Irén Sitkey as Nusi, cukrászdáslány
- Sándor Solymossy as Súgó
- Lajos Ujváry as Színész
- Anna Zöldhelyi as Kerényiné, Julia
