= Wild Rose (1939 film) =

1939 film

- Directed by: Béla Balogh; Béla Pásztor
- Written by: Ernő Andai
- Produced by: Péter Bajusz; Ernő Teichmann
- Starring: Margit Dajka; Árpád Lehotay; Erzsi Simor
- Cinematography: Ferenc Gergelits
- Edited by: Péter Pokol
- Music by: Mihály Eisemann
- Production company: Pásztor Film
- Release date: 9 March 1939
- Running time: 89 minutes
- Country: Hungary
- Language: Hungarian

Wild Rose (Hungarian: Vadrózsa) is a 1939 Hungarian comedy film directed by Béla Balogh and Béla Pásztor and starring Margit Dajka, Árpád Lehotay and Erzsi Simor. It was shot at the Hunnia Studios in Budapest. The film's sets were designed by the art director János Pagonyi.

== Cast ==
- Margit Dajka as Éva
- Árpád Lehotay as Dr. Sziráky, ügyvéd
- Kálmán Rózsahegyi as Ábris nagypapa
- Mariska Vízváry as Klementin nagymama
- Erzsi Simor as Mária, Sziráky titkárnõje
- László Perényi as Dr.Ámon János, orvos
- Sándor Pethes as Farkas
- Ferenc Pethes as Szabó Feri
- Ferenc Hoykó as Sofõr
- György Kürthy as Bártfai Elemér
- János Balassa as komornyik Szirákynál
- Ilona Dajbukát as Julcsa, dada
- Etelka Dán as Rozi
- Sári Déry as Tertayné
- Gusztáv Harasztos as Szabó
- Ilona Kökény as Bártfainé
- László Misoga as Altiszt
- Ilona Náday as Szirákiék szobalánya
- Zoltán Pethö as Pista, cseléd a birtokon
- Marcsa Simon as Mama, Rozi anyja
- Lajos Ujváry as Gárdonyi Elemér

== Bibliography ==
- Juhász, István. Kincses magyar filmtár 1931-1944: az eredeti forgatókönyvből 1931 és 1944 között létrejött hazai mozgóképekről. Kráter, 2007.
- Rîpeanu, Bujor. (ed.) International Directory of Cinematographers, Set- and Costume Designers in Film: Hungary (from the beginnings to 1988). Saur, 1981.
