= Cadet Love =

1942 film

- Directed by: Frigyes Bán
- Written by: Frigyes Bán; István Békeffy
- Produced by: Árpád Güttler
- Starring: Valéria Hidvéghy; Margit Zsilley; Margit Árpád
- Cinematography: Árpád Makay
- Edited by: Péter Pokol
- Music by: Béla Dolecskó
- Production company: Palatinus Filmterjesztõ Vállalat
- Release date: 8 August 1942
- Running time: 96 minutes
- Country: Hungary
- Language: Hungarian

Cadet Love (Hungarian: Kadétszerelem) is a 1942 Hungarian comedy film directed by Frigyes Bán and starring Valéria Hidvéghy, Margit Zsilley and Margit Árpád. It was shot at the Hunnia Studios in Budapest. The film's sets were designed by the art director József Simoncsics.

== Cast ==
- Valéria Hidvéghy as Annus
- Margit Zsilley as Bambi
- Margit Árpád as Macskássy tanárnõ
- Karola Zala as Igazgatónõ
- Gábor Rajnay as Lipót Szalvétor fõherceg
- Jenö Pataky as Koltay Gyuri / Koltay Ferenc ezredes, Gyuri apja
- Gyula Benkö as Böszörményi Pista
- Zoltán Makláry as Kapitány János
- József Juhász as Õrmester
- Ernö Mihályi as Ezredorvos
- György Solthy as Morvay ezredes
- Tibor Puskás as Havlicska Vencel
- Sándor Naszódy as Ajtay akadémikus
- István Lontay as Gáspár százados
- István Falussy as Alezredes, a herceg kísérõje a lánynevelõ intézet ünnepségén
- Károly Hajagos as Rendõr
- Erzsike Hajdu as Kislány a leánynevelö intézet ünnepségén
- József Medgyessy as Statiszta a leánynevelõ intézet ünnepségén
- Erzsébet Medgyesy as Horváth Annus dadája
- Erzsébet Nádudvary as Diáklány
- Gyula Terney as Kadét

== Bibliography ==
- Balski, Grzegorz. Directory of Eastern European Film-makers and Films 1945–1991. Flicks Books, 1992.
- Juhász, István. Kincses magyar filmtár 1931–1944: az eredeti forgatókönyvből 1931 és 1944 között létrejött hazai mozgóképekről. Kráter, 2007.
- Rîpeanu, Bujor. (ed.) International Directory of Cinematographers, Set- and Costume Designers in Film: Hungary (from the beginnings to 1988). Saur, 1981.
