= There Are Exceptions =

1937 film

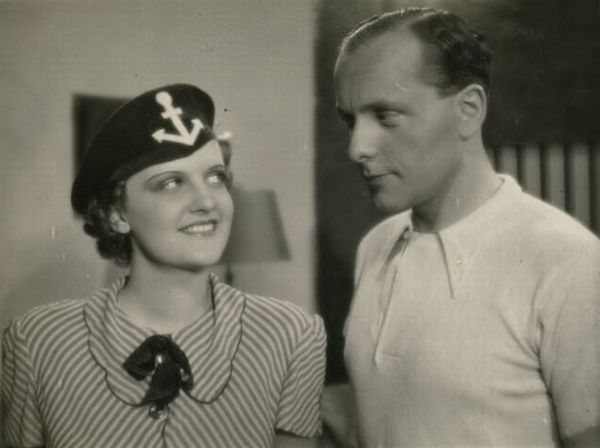
- Directed by: Ákos Ráthonyi
- Written by: Pál Vári
- Based on: Tisztelet a kivételnek by Elemér Boross
- Produced by: György Engel; László Szirtes
- Starring: Imre Ráday; Klári Tolnay; Kálmán Rózsahegyi
- Cinematography: Tamás Keményffy
- Edited by: Zoltán Farkas
- Music by: György Fejér
- Production company: Focusfilm
- Distributed by: Hungaria Pictures
- Release date: 9 January 1937
- Running time: 85 minutes
- Country: Hungary
- Language: Hungarian

There Are Exceptions (Hungarian: Tisztelet a kivételnek) is a 1937 Hungarian romantic drama film directed by Ákos Ráthonyi and starring Imre Ráday, Klári Tolnay and Kálmán Rózsahegyi. It was shot at the Hunnia Studios in Budapest. The film's sets were designed by the art director István Szirontai Lhotka. It was based on a 1933 stage play of the same title by Elemér Boross.

== Synopsis ==
Endre, a wealthy young toy manufacturer, is a practiced seducer of women. When he takes the attractive Vera for a weekend at his riverside property, he is shocked when she resists his advances after discovering he is only after a good time. He is deeply concerned that she has drowned following a motorboat accident, and is relieved when she is found safe. She now wants nothing to do with him, but his uncle believes that the couple are suited to each other and sets out to bring them together.

== Cast ==
- Imre Ráday as Julián Endre
- Klári Tolnay as Kántor Vera
- Kálmán Rózsahegyi as Kántor János
- Márton Rátkai as Reményi bácsi
- Mariska Vízváry as Kántor Jánosné
- Ila Mecséry as Baba
- József Juhász as Csokor úr
- Tivadar Bilicsi as Tibor
- Ági Donáth as Vera iskolatársa
- Lola László as Lici
- Éva Bíró as Mici, gépírókisasszony a játékgyárban
- Harry Csáktornyai as Játékgyári gyakornok
- Lajos Gárday as õrmester
- Gyula Justh as Fõpincér
- József Lengyel as Pincér
- István Lontay as Vendég az étteremben
- Emmi Nagy as Julián exbarátnõje
- Ferenc Pataki as Vendég az étteremben
- Sándor Peti as Ablakmosó
- Erzsi Pártos as Vera iskolatársa
- Marcsa Simon as Trenka
- Lili Szász as Júlián titkárnõje
- Ferenc Antók as Pincér
- Gyöngyi Váry as Vera iskolatársa

== Bibliography ==
- Juhász, István. Kincses magyar filmtár 1931-1944: az eredeti forgatókönyvből 1931 és 1944 között létrejött hazai mozgóképekről. Kráter, 2007.
- Rîpeanu, Bujor. (ed.) International Directory of Cinematographers, Set- and Costume Designers in Film: Hungary (from the beginnings to 1988). Saur, 1981.
