= Crime at Dawn =

1960 film

- Directed by: Zoltán Várkonyi
- Written by: László Babura; Péter Bacsó; Gábor Thurzó
- Produced by: József Gyõrffy; István Daubner
- Starring: Lajos Básti; Irén Psota; Antal Páger
- Cinematography: István Hildebrand
- Edited by: Zoltán Farkas
- Music by: Ferenc Farkas
- Production company: Budapest Filmstúdió
- Release date: 4 February 1960
- Running time: 97 minutes
- Country: Hungary
- Language: Hungarian

Crime at Dawn or Assassination Attempt (Hungarian: Merénylet) is a 1960 Hungarian drama film directed by Zoltán Várkonyi and starring Lajos Básti, Irén Psota and Antal Páger. It was shot at the Hunnia Studios in Budapest. The film's sets were designed by the art director István Básthy.

== Cast ==
- Lajos Básti as Marschalkó Julius
- Irén Psota as Lonci
- Antal Páger as Havel - nyugdijas nyomozó
- Tamás Major as Halmágyi
- Nóra Tábori as Marschalkóné
- Oszkár Ascher as Fischbaum
- Emese Balogh
- Zoltán Basilides
- György Bikádi
- László Bánhidi
- Anna Báró as Pénztárosnõ
- Endre Csonka
- Andor Dárday
- György Engel
- Anikó Gyõrffy
- György Györffy
- László György
- Gyula Horváth as Schwetz
- Ferenc Járay
- Gyula Kamarás
- József Kautzky
- Mária Keresztessy Eszti néni
- Béla Kollár
- György Kálmán
- Sándor Kömíves
- Ágnes Lelkes
- Erzsi Lengyel
- Tihamér Lázár
- Zoltán Makláry as Szandai doktor
- Géza Márky
- Erzsi Orsolya
- Sándor Peti
- Bertalan Solti
- Anni Soltész
- Lajos Sugár
- Sándor Suka
- István Szegedi Szabó
- Antónia Szücs
- Árpád Téry
- Éva Tímár
- Klára Zakariás
- János Zách as Kiscelli

== Bibliography ==
- Liehm, Mira & Liehm, Antonín J. The Most Important Art: Soviet and Eastern European Film After 1945. University of California Press, 1980.
- Rîpeanu, Bujor. (ed.) International Directory of Cinematographers, Set- and Costume Designers in Film: Hungary (from the beginnings to 1988). Saur, 1981.
