= Katyi =

1942 film

- Directed by: Ákos Ráthonyi
- Written by: Andor Kolozsvári; Géza Palásthy
- Based on: Katyi by Margit Soóky
- Produced by: Miklós Szalontai Kiss
- Starring: Klári Tolnay; Manyi Kiss; Gerő Mály
- Cinematography: István Eiben
- Edited by: Zoltán Kerényi
- Music by: Szabolcs Fényes
- Production company: Objektív Film
- Release date: 17 December 1942
- Running time: 89 minutes
- Country: Hungary
- Language: Hungarian

Katyi is a 1942 Hungarian comedy film directed by Ákos Ráthonyi and starring Klári Tolnay, Manyi Kiss and Gerő Mály. It was shot at the Hunnia Studios in Budapest. The film's sets were designed by the art director József Simoncsics.

== Cast ==
- Klári Tolnay as Varga Kató / Katyi
- Manyi Kiss as Csiba Kati
- Tivadar Bilicsi as Geszty Péter, színmûvész
- Gerö Mály as Ferenc
- Piroska Vaszary as Vargáné
- Mici Erdélyi as Mária
- Sándor Pethes as Lajos
- József Juhász as Pálinkás Bence
- László Misoga as Csiba Márton
- Ferenc Antók as Péter barátja
- Nándor Bihary as Csóti papa
- István Falussy as Színészfelvételi bizottság tagja
- Lajos Gárday as Rendõr
- György Hajnal as Kapus
- Gusztáv Harasztos as Péter barátja
- Edit Hlatky as Lajos felesége
- Éva Kelemen as Színinövendék
- Ilona Kökény as Fóti mama
- Gyula Köváry as Konferanszié
- István Lontay as Fogalmazó
- Tihamér Lázár as Pincér
- Lajos Mezey as Színinövendék
- Ila Nagy as Lili
- Klára Pápai as A gyerek anyja
- Marcsa Simon as Kofa
- Sándor Solymossy as Ügyfél a folttisztítónál
- Lajos Sugár as Detektív
- Ferenc Szabó as Egy lakó
- Margit Vágóné as Egy utas
- Gusztáv Vándory as Rendõrfelügyelõ

== Bibliography ==
- Juhász, István. Kincses magyar filmtár 1931-1944: az eredeti forgatókönyvből 1931 és 1944 között létrejött hazai mozgóképekről. Kráter, 2007.
- Rîpeanu, Bujor. (ed.) International Directory of Cinematographers, Set- and Costume Designers in Film: Hungary (from the beginnings to 1988). Saur, 1981.
