= The Minister's Friend =

1939 film

- Directed by: Viktor Bánky
- Written by: Viktor Bánky; István Békeffy
- Produced by: Elemér Kassay
- Starring: Antal Páger; Júlia Komár; Mici Erdélyi; Béla Mihályffi
- Cinematography: István Eiben
- Edited by: Viktor Bánky
- Music by: Mihály Eisemann
- Production company: Ibusz Film
- Release date: 30 November 1939
- Running time: 95 minutes
- Country: Hungary
- Language: Hungarian

The Minister's Friend (Hungarian: A miniszter barátja) is a 1939 Hungarian comedy film directed by Viktor Bánky and starring Antal Páger, Júlia Komár, Mici Erdélyi and Béla Mihályffi. It was shot at the Hunnia Studios in Budapest. The film's sets were designed by the art director Imre Sőrés.

== Synopsis ==
A chemical engineer is struggling to find work and is employed a shop assistant. Things change dramatically when he is mistakenly believed to a friend of a government minister.

== Cast ==
- Antal Páger as Kovács János, vegyészmérnök
- Júlia Komár as Manci, manikûröslány
- Mici Erdélyi as Lulu mûvésznõ
- Béla Mihályffi as Miniszter
- Lajos Boray as Molnár úr
- György Dénes as Takács Feri
- Lenke Egyed as Lukácsné
- Gizi Hernády as Vilmuska, pénztáros kisasszony a drogériában
- Lajos Ihász as Kozák úr
- Terus Kováts as Szobatulajdonosnõ
- Panni Kéry as Teri
- Lajos Köpeczi Boócz as Kucsera,üzletvezetõ
- Gyula Köváry as Kölcsönzõ
- György Kürthy as Igazgató
- Tihamér Lázár as Kulcsár igazgató
- György Nagyajtay as Mopré, francia nagykövet
- Sándor Naszódy as újságárus
- Romola Németh as Surányi Gizi
- László Pálóczi as Báró Gallay Tibor
- Karola Zala as Vendég az estélyen, a miniszter felesége
- Anni Eisen as Statiszta az estélyen
- György Gonda as Kertész
- Géza Márky as Titkár
- Margit Vágóné as Kovács anyja

== Bibliography ==
- Juhász, István. Kincses magyar filmtár 1931-1944: az eredeti forgatókönyvből 1931 és 1944 között létrejött hazai mozgóképekről. Kráter, 2007.
- Rîpeanu, Bujor. (ed.) International Directory of Cinematographers, Set- and Costume Designers in Film: Hungary (from the beginnings to 1988). Saur, 1981.
