= Mirage by the Lake =

1940 film

- Directed by: László Kalmár
- Written by: Árpád Herczeg; Júlianna Zsigray
- Produced by: Mária Hausz
- Starring: Pál Jávor; Klári Tolnay; Erzsi Simor
- Cinematography: István Eiben
- Edited by: Zoltán Kerényi
- Music by: Szabolcs Fényes
- Production company: Mária Hausz Productions
- Release date: 20 December 1940
- Running time: 93 minutes
- Country: Hungary
- Language: Hungarian

Mirage by the Lake (Hungarian: Tóparti látomás) is a 1940 Hungarian drama film directed by László Kalmár and starring Pál Jávor, Klári Tolnay and Erzsi Simor. The film's sets were designed by the art director Márton Vincze.

== Cast ==
- Pál Jávor as Koltay Iván, festõmûvész
- Klári Tolnay as Balázs, Anna
- Erzsi Simor as Máté Gitta
- Lili Berky as Koltay édesanyja
- Éva Libertiny as Panni, modell
- Irén Sitkey as Agáta
- György Solthy as Balázs professzor, szanatóriumigazgató
- Anci Barna as Beteg
- György Hajnal as Vendég a boszorkánybálon
- Gizi Hernády as Játékbolti eladó
- József Tamás as Segédorvos
- Gábor Rajnay
- Zoltán Makláry
- Irén Hamala

== Bibliography ==
- Guesnet, François, Lupovitch, Howard & Polonsky, Antony(ed.) Polin: Studies in Polish Jewry Volume 31: Poland and Hungary: Jewish Realities Compared. Liverpool University Press, 2018.
- Juhász, István. Kincses magyar filmtár 1931-1944: az eredeti forgatókönyvből 1931 és 1944 között létrejött hazai mozgóképekről. Kráter, 2007.
- Rîpeanu, Bujor. (ed.) International Directory of Cinematographers, Set- and Costume Designers in Film: Hungary (from the beginnings to 1988). Saur, 1981.
