= Landslide (1940 film) =

- Directed by: Arzén von Cserépy
- Written by: János Kodolányi (play); György Patkós
- Starring: Antal Páger; Olga Eszenyi; Ferenc Kiss; Marcsa Simon
- Cinematography: István Eiben
- Edited by: László Cserépy
- Music by: Dénes Tóth
- Production company: Népfilm
- Release date: 28 January 1940
- Running time: 92 minutes
- Country: Hungary
- Language: Hungarian

Landslide (Hungarian: Földindulás) is a 1940 Hungarian drama film directed by Arzén von Cserépy and starring Antal Páger, Olga Eszenyi and Ferenc Kiss. Although ostensibly a romance film, it contained significant amounts of propaganda supportive of the policies of Hungary's far-right government. It was based on a play by János Kodolányi.

The screenplay was written by Gyorgy Patkós.

The film offered János Görbe the role that would allow his breakthrough.

== Cast ==
- Antal Páger as Kántor János
- Olga Eszenyi as Julis, Kántor felesége
- Ferenc Kiss as Böbek Samu
- Marcsa Simon as Böbekné
- Mária Keresztessy as Jehovás Zsófi
- Tivadar Bilicsi as Weintraub
- Zoltán Hosszú as Szektás Samu
- Paula Bacsányi as Piókás szüle
- Lenke Egyed as Mari néni
- János Görbe as Szektás prédikátor
- Ilona Kiszely as Kristóf Márika
- Lajos Boray as Orvos
- Irma Vass as Szektás Samu felesége
- Lajos Gárday as Péter, halász
- Ferenc Hoykó as Plébános
- Miklós Sármássy as Falusi ember
- Béla Tompa as Falusi ember
- Jenö Danis as Falusi ember
- Aladár Szilágyi as Falusi ember
- Rezsõ Acsay as Falusi ember
- Aranka Gazdy as Falusi nõ
- Terus Kováts as Falusi nõ
- József Pataky as Cigányprímás
- Gyuszi Ungvári as Józsika, Kántorék fia

== Bibliography ==
- Cunningham, John. Hungarian Cinema: From Coffee House to Multiplex. Wallflower Press, 2004.
