= The Song of Rákóczi =

1943 film

- Directed by: József Daróczy
- Written by: Miklós Asztalos; József Daróczy
- Produced by: József Daróczy; Eta Hajdú
- Starring: Klári Tolnay; János Sárdy; Károly Kovács
- Cinematography: István Eiben
- Edited by: Zoltán Kerényi
- Music by: Ferenc Farkas
- Production company: Produkciojabam Dr. Bingert Janos
- Release date: 24 November 1943
- Running time: 112 minutes
- Country: Hungary
- Language: Hungarian

The Song of Rákóczi (Hungarian: Rákóczi nótája) is a 1943 Hungarian historical adventure film directed by József Daróczy and starring Klári Tolnay, János Sárdy and Károly Kovács. It was shot at the Hunnia Studios in Budapest. The film's sets were designed by the art director László Dudás.

== Synopsis ==
During Rákóczi's War of Independence against the Habsburg Empire, a young woman adopts various disguises in order to assist Francis Rákóczi and to rescue her own lover from the Austrians.

== Cast ==
- Klári Tolnay as Oltay Krisztinka / Fruzsa néni / Cinka Panna
- János Sárdy as Szakmáry Péter
- Károly Kovács as Szakmáry Frigyes
- Géza Abonyi as II.Rákóczi Ferenc
- Samu Balázs as Hosszu kuruc vitéz
- Sándor Tompa as Tömpe kuruc vitéz
- László Pálóczi as gr. Bercsényi Miklós
- Béla Mihályffi as Károlyi Sándor
- László Ungváry as br. Löffelholz csász. tábornok
- Gyula Csortos asdes Ailleurs francia követ
- Zoltán Makláry as Vak Bottyán
- Sándor Hidassy as Esze Tamás
- Sári Déry as Cseh nõ
- Imre Toronyi as Túróczy Márton
- Margit Ladomerszky as Túróczyné
- Mariska Halassy as Túróczy lánya

== Bibliography ==
- Judson, Pieter and M. Rozenblit, Marsha L. (ed). Constructing Nationalities in East Central Europe. Berghahn Books, 2005.
- Juhász, István. Kincses magyar filmtár 1931-1944: az eredeti forgatókönyvből 1931 és 1944 között létrejött hazai mozgóképekről. Kráter, 2007.
- Rîpeanu, Bujor. (ed.) International Directory of Cinematographers, Set- and Costume Designers in Film: Hungary (from the beginnings to 1988). Saur, 1981.
