= Six Weeks of Happiness =

1939 film

- Directed by: André De Toth
- Written by: Jenõ Szatmári; Zoltán Várkonyi
- Produced by: Antal Takács
- Starring: Klári Tolnay; Ferenc Kiss; László Szilassy
- Cinematography: Árpád Makay
- Edited by: Lajos Paál
- Music by: Szabolcs Fényes
- Production company: Takács Film
- Release date: 23 November 1939
- Running time: 80 minutes
- Country: Hungary
- Language: Hungarian

Six Weeks of Happiness (Hungarian: Hat hét boldogság) is a 1939 Hungarian romantic comedy film directed by André De Toth and starring Klári Tolnay, Ferenc Kiss and László Szilassy. The film's sets were designed by the art director Márton Vincze.

== Cast ==
- Klári Tolnay as Éva, Bozsó lánya
- Ferenc Kiss as Bozsó Gábor
- László Szilassy as Horváth Miklós, mûegyetemi hallgató
- Margit Ladomerszky as Igazgatónõ
- Éva Szaplonczay as Titkárnö
- Béla Mihályffi as Strumpf Jeromos,ékszerkereskedõ
- Sándor Pethes as A részeges kalligráfus
- Sándor Tompa as Kalauz, asztaltársasági elnök Óbudán
- Károly Kovács as Borbély Franci, betörõ
- Ferenc Pethes as 'Õrgróf' az amatõregyüttesben
- László Misoga as Zsebtolvaj
- Elemér Baló as a Három Garas Asztaltársaság tagja
- Tihamér Lázár as Autóbusz kalauz

== Bibliography ==
- Juhász, István. Kincses magyar filmtár 1931-1944: az eredeti forgatókönyvből 1931 és 1944 között létrejött hazai mozgóképekről. Kráter, 2007.
- Rîpeanu, Bujor. (ed.) International Directory of Cinematographers, Set- and Costume Designers in Film: Hungary (from the beginnings to 1988). Saur, 1981.
- Wakeman, John. World Film Directors: 1890-1945. H.W. Wilson, 1987.
