= Czardas of Hearts =

1951 film

- Directed by: Sándor Szlatinay
- Written by: Helmuth M. Backhaus; Sándor Szlatinay
- Based on: Servus Peter play by Károly Nóti; Servus Peter 1939 film by Sándor Szlatinay
- Produced by: Toni Schelkopf
- Starring: Wolf Albach-Retty; Hannelore Bollmann; Dorit Kreysler
- Cinematography: Ernst W. Kalinke
- Edited by: Hilde Grebner
- Music by: Willy Mattes
- Production company: Oska-Film
- Distributed by: Siegel Monopolfilm
- Release date: 26 January 1951
- Running time: 82 minutes
- Country: West Germany
- Language: German

Czardas of Hearts (German: Czardas der Herzen) is a 1951 West German comedy film directed by Sándor Szlatinay and starring Wolf Albach-Retty, Hannelore Bollmann and Dorit Kreysler. It was shot at the Bavaria Studios in Munich. It was based on the play Servus Peter by Károly Nóti and it is also known by this title. An earlier version of the story Hello, Peter! was made by Szlatinay in Hungary in 1939.

== Synopsis ==
In pre-war Budapest the struggling actor Paul is mistaken for his doppelganger Peter, a celebrated film director. Peter wants a break from the public interest and pressures of his job and hires Paul to masquerade as him for several days.

== Cast ==
- Wolf Albach-Retty as Peter Tornay / Paul Endre
- Hannelore Bollmann as Eva Tornay
- Edith Klinger as Marika Egressy
- Dorit Kreysler as Lilly
- Iván Petrovich as Tornay senior
- Oskar Sima as Ferenc
- Erik Ode as Gabor Takacs
- Hermann Pfeiffer as Takacs senior
- Elfie Beyer as Gizi Takacs
- Marianne Koch as Reporterin

== Bibliography ==
- Goble, Alan. The Complete Index to Literary Sources in Film. Walter de Gruyter, 1999.
