= Miklós Asztalos =

Hungarian writer and historian

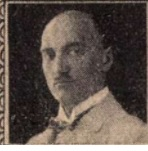
- Asztalos in 1926.
- Born: 28 July 1899; Budapest, Austria-Hungary
- Died: 23 February 1986 (aged 86); Körösladány, Hungary
- Occupations: Writer, Historian
- Years active: 1940–1944 (film)

Miklós Asztalos (1899–1986) was a Hungarian playwright, historian and screenwriter.

== Selected filmography ==
- Yes or No? (1940)
- Flames (1941)
- Silent Monastery (1941)
- The Relative of His Excellency (1941)
- The Talking Robe (1942)
- Kádár Versus Kerekes (1942)
- Lóránd Fráter (1942)
- The Song of Rákóczi (1943)
- Strange Roads (1944)
- Devil Rider (1944)
- Loving Hearts (1944)

== Bibliography ==
- Gremsperger, László & Gyeskó, Ágnes. Ki kicsoda a magyar irodalomban?. Könyvkuckó, 1996.
- Juhász, István. Kincses magyar filmtár 1931–1944: az eredeti forgatókönyvből 1931 és 1944 között létrejött hazai mozgóképekről. Kráter, 2007.
- Van Ginderachter, Maarten & Fox, Jon. National indifference and the History of Nationalism in Modern Europe. Routledge, 2019.
