= Entry Forbidden (film) =

1941 film

- Directed by: Emil Martonffi
- Written by: Emil Martonffi; Károly Nóti; Géza Palásthy
- Starring: Erzsi Simor; Tivadar Bilicsi; Kálmán Latabár
- Cinematography: Barnabás Hegyi
- Edited by: László Katonka
- Music by: Gyula Balázs; Ferenc Gyulai Gaál; Ákos Holéczy
- Production company: Kárpát Film
- Release date: 1941
- Running time: 85 minutes
- Country: Hungary
- Language: Hungarian

Entry Forbidden (Hungarian: Behajtani tilos) is a 1941 Hungarian comedy film directed by Emil Martonffi and starring Erzsi Simor, Tivadar Bilicsi and Kálmán Latabár. The film's sets were designed by the art directors István Básthy and Sándor Iliszi.

== Cast ==
- Tivadar Bilicsi as Gilicze Antal
- Kálmán Latabár as Mihály
- Erzsi Simor as Juliska, seamstress
- Margit Vágóné as Mrs Kerekes, Juliska's grandmother
- Gábor Rajnay as Szilvássy
- Piroska Vaszary as Mrs Szilvássy
- Béla Mihályffi as Kelemen
- Zoltán Makláry as Medvey
- Manyi Kiss as Boris, maid
- György Solthy as Lawyer
- József Juhász as Chauffeur
- Ferenc Pethes as Józsi, newsagent
- Sándor Pethes as Medical instructor
- Gusztáv Pártos as Tarajos, Boris's suitor
- László Földényi as Garage manager
- Gyöngyi Váradi as Nurse
- Livia Miklós as Waitress
- János Balázs as Car wash man
- György Gonda as NCO
- István Szász as Lady
- Ákos Holéczy as Conductor
- Jenö Danis as Policeman
- Endre C. Turáni as Winnie the Pooh
- László Misoga as Porter
- Lenke Egyed as Cook
- Ilona Komlóssy as Old woman
- Pál Vessely as Passenger

== Bibliography ==
- Frey, David. Jews, Nazis and the Cinema of Hungary: The Tragedy of Success, 1929-1944. Bloomsbury Publishing, 2017.
- Juhász, István. Kincses magyar filmtár 1931-1944: az eredeti forgatókönyvből 1931 és 1944 között létrejött hazai mozgóképekről. Kráter, 2007.
- Rîpeanu, Bujor. (ed.) International Directory of Cinematographers, Set- and Costume Designers in Film: Hungary (from the beginnings to 1988). Saur, 1981.
