= Gyula Köváry =

Hungarian actor (1884–1967)

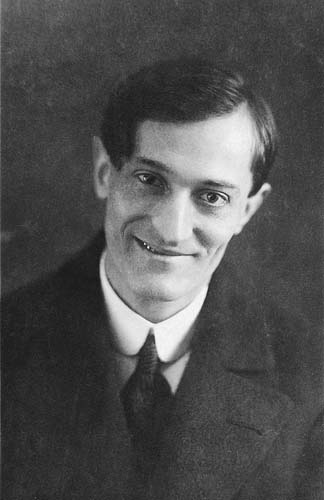
- Köváry in 1910.
- Born: 17 May 1884; Rimaszombat, Austro-Hungarian Empire
- Died: 15 July 1967 (aged 83); Vienna, Austria
- Occupation: Actor
- Years active: 1917–1957 (film)

Gyula Köváry (1884–1967) was a Hungarian stage and film actor and screenwriter. He featured in the Budapest cabaret scene. In cinema he appeared in supporting roles from the silent era to the 1950s. After the failed Hungarian Revolution of 1956 he emigrated and settled in Austria.

== Selected filmography ==
- The Borrowed Castle (1937)
- Rosemary (1938)
- The Lady Is a Bit Cracked (1938)
- The Five-Forty (1939)
- No Coincidence (1939)
- The Minister's Friend (1939)
- Money Is Coming (1939)
- You Are the Song (1940)
- Seven Plum Trees (1940)
- Matthew Arranges Things (1940)
- Much Ado About Emmi (1940)
- The Chequered Coat (1940)
- Yes or No? (1940)
- András (1941)
- Prince Bob (1941)
- Kádár Versus Kerekes (1942)
- Katyi (1942)
- The Perfect Family (1942)
- Quite a Lad (1943)
- The Marsh Flower (1943)
- The Night Girl (1943)
- After the Storm (1945)
- The State Department Store (1953)

== Bibliography ==
- Bodó, Bela. Black Humor and the White Terror. Taylor & Francis, 2023.
- Laura, Ernesto G. Tutti i film di Venezia, 1932–1984. La Biennale, Settore cinema e spettacolo televisivo, 1985.
- Székely, György & Gajdó, Tamás. Magyar színháztörténet: 1920-1949. Akadémiai Kiadó, 1990.
- Robertson, James C. The Casablanca Man: The Cinema of Michael Curtiz. Psychology Press, 1994.
