= György Solthy =

Hungarian actor (1904–1961)

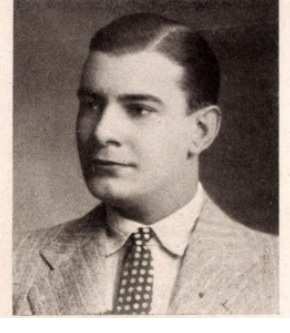
- Solthy in 1931.
- Born: 18 May 1904; Sopron, Austria-Hungary
- Died: 14 November 1961 (aged 57); Budapest, Hungary
- Occupation: Actor
- Years active: 1940–1954 (film)

György Solthy (1904–1961) was a Hungarian stage and film actor. He played supporting roles in a number of Hungarian films.

== Selected filmography ==
- Mirage by the Lake (1940)
- Dankó Pista (1940)
- Don't Ask Who I Was (1941)
- Silent Monastery (1941)
- Taken by the Flood (1941)
- Left-Handed Angel (1941)
- Entry Forbidden (1941)
- Háry János (1941)
- Temptation (1942)
- Cadet Love (1942)
- Black Dawn (1943)
- The Marsh Flower (1943)
- Rózsa Nemes (1943)
- Mouse in the Palace (1943)
- I Dreamed of You (1943)
- Dream Waltz (1943)
- Gala Suit (1949)
- Mattie the Goose-boy (1950)
- Déryné (1951)
- Try and Win (1952)
- Erkel (1952)

== Bibliography ==
- Goble, Alan. The Complete Index to Literary Sources in Film. Walter de Gruyter, 1999.
- Klossner, Michael. The Europe of 1500-1815 on Film and Television: A Worldwide Filmography of Over 2550 Works, 1895 Through 2000. McFarland & Company, 2002.
- Laura, Ernesto G. Tutti i film di Venezia, 1932–1984. La Biennale, Settore cinema e spettacolo televisivo, 1985.
- Székely, György & Gajdó, Tamás. Magyar színháztörténet: 1920-1949. Akadémiai Kiadó, 1990.
