= Déryné (film) =

1951 film

- Directed by: László Kalmár
- Written by: István Békeffy
- Produced by: Jenõ Katona
- Starring: Klári Tolnay; Gábor Rajnay; Gyula Gózon
- Cinematography: István Eiben
- Edited by: Zoltán Kerényi
- Music by: János Kerekes; Tibor Polgár
- Production company: Magyar Filmgyártó
- Release date: 19 October 1951
- Running time: 111 minutes
- Country: Hungary
- Language: Hungarian

Déryné is a 1951 Hungarian historical biographical drama film directed by László Kalmár and starring Klári Tolnay, Gábor Rajnay and Gyula Gózon. The film's sets were designed by the art director Zoltán Fábri. It is based on the life of opera singer Déryné Róza Széppataki.

== Synopsis ==
Déryné rejects fame in German theatre in order to return home and establish the first Hungarian-language theatre, at the time part of the Austrian Empire.

== Cast ==
- Klári Tolnay as Déryné
- Gábor Rajnay as Uncle Benke
- Gyula Gózon as Major Neunherz
- Tivadar Bilicsi as Murányi Zsiga
- Sándor Szabó as Déry István
- Sándor Bánáti as Kõszegi Alajos
- Tivadar Horváth as Balogh István
- József Berky as Kramarics
- Gyula Bartos as Greek uncle
- Ida Turay as Mrs. Murányi
- Mária Keresztessy as Mrs. Sáska
- Ila Lóth as Böõsi Anna
- Ági Mednyánszky as Cecilia
- János Sárdy as Szentpétery Zsigmond
- Tibor Molnár as Katona József
- Sándor Deák as Kulcsár István
- György Solthy as Vida, theater director
- Ella Gombaszögi as Déryné's mother
- Hanna Honthy as Mrs. Cibulka
- Lajos Básti as Gróf Altenberg
- Tivadar Uray as Térey, court councilor
- Gyula Tapolczay as Mayor of Miskolc

== Bibliography ==
- Burns, Bryan. World Cinema: Hungary. Fairleigh Dickinson Univ Press, 1996.
