= József Daróczy =

Hungarian film director

- Born: 23 October 1885; Budapest, Austro-Hungarian Empire
- Died: 25 March 1950 (aged 64); Budapest, Hungary
- Occupations: Director, Screenwriter, Producer
- Years active: 1933–1945 (film)

József Daróczy (1885–1950) was a Hungarian film director, screenwriter and producer.

== Selected filmography ==
- Stolen Wednesday (1933)
- Tales of Budapest (1937)
- Man Sometimes Errs (1938)
- Hungary's Revival (1939)
- The Ball Is On (1939)
- Yes or No? (1940)
- Finally! (1941)
- Miért? (1941)
- Male Fidelity (1942)
- The Song of Rákóczi (1943)
- Késö (1943)
- After the Storm (1945)

== Bibliography ==
- Burns, Bryan. World Cinema: Hungary. Fairleigh Dickinson Univ Press, 1996.
- Cunningham, John. Hungarian Cinema: From Coffee House to Multiplex. Wallflower Press, 2004.
