= Jenö Danis =

Hungarian actor

Jenő Danis
- Born: 6 March 1886; Nagykanizsa, Austria-Hungary
- Died: 4 September 1963 (aged 77); Budapest, Hungary
- Occupation: Actor
- Years active: 1940–1953 (film)

Jenő Danis (1886–1963) was a Hungarian stage and film actor. He appeared in more than forty films.

== Selected filmography ==
- Landslide (1940)
- On the Way Home (1940)
- Entry Forbidden (1941)
- Prince Bob (1941)
- Let's Love Each Other (1941)
- The Devil Doesn't Sleep (1941)
- Sirius (1942)
- The Talking Robe (1942)
- A Woman Looks Back (1942)
- Changing the Guard (1942)
- Annamária (1943)
- Together (1943)
- Black Dawn (1943)
- Mouse in the Palace (1943)
- The White Train (1943)
- It Happened in Budapest (1944)
- Half a Boy (1944)
- Loving Hearts (1944)
- Wedding March (1944)
- Wildfire (1944)
- After the Storm (1945)
- Song of the Cornfields (1947)
- The Sea Has Risen (1953)

== Bibliography ==
- Hames, Peter. The Cinema Of Central Europe. Wallflower Press, 2004. ISBN 978-1-904764-20-5
- Kramme, Ulrike. Ungarisches biographisches Archiv: Fiche 1-21. A.R.-Azzo. K.G. Saur Verlag, 1993.
- Laura, Ernesto G. Tutti i film di Venezia, 1932–1984. La Biennale, Settore cinema e spettacolo televisivo, 1985.
- Székely, György & Gajdó, Tamás. Magyar színháztörténet: 1920-1949. Akadémiai Kiadó, 1990. ISBN 978-963-549-241-1
