= Mihály Eisemann =

Hungarian composer

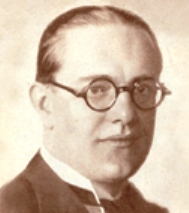
- Eisemann in the 1930s.
- Born: 19 June 1898; Paripás, Austria-Hungary
- Died: 25 February 1966 (aged 67); Budapest, Hungary
- Occupation: Composer
- Years active: 1927–1943 (film)

Mihály Eisemann (1898–1966) was a Hungarian composer and conductor. He composed operettas and film scores. He was born in an area that after the First World War became part of Serbia. He was one of a number of leading composers to produce irredentist songs supporting a Greater Hungary and the reverse of the country's territorial losses at the Treaty of Trianon.

== Selected filmography ==
- Hyppolit, the Butler (1931)
- Everyone Asks for Erika (1931)
- The Soaring Maiden (1931)
- The Ghost Train (1933)
- Es flüstert die Liebe (1935)
- The Minister's Friend (1939)
- Wild Rose (1939)
- Borrowed Husbands (1942)

== Bibliography ==
- Gänzl, Kurt. The Encyclopedia of the Musical Theatre, Volume 1. Schirmer Books, 1994.
- Zeidler, Miklós . Ideas on Territorial Revision in Hungary, 1920-1945. Social Science Monographs, 2008.
