= The Bercsenyi Hussars =

1940 film

- Directed by: Sándor Szlatinay
- Written by: Sándor Hunyady; Attila Orbók; Sándor Szlatinay; János Zalabéri Horváth
- Produced by: István Erdélyi; János Zalabéri Horváth
- Starring: Zita Szeleczky; László Szilassy; Margit Makay
- Cinematography: Rudolf Icsey
- Edited by: László Katonka
- Music by: Sándor Szlatinay
- Production company: Magyar Film Iroda
- Distributed by: Kárpát Film
- Release date: 4 January 1940
- Running time: 81 minutes
- Country: Hungary
- Language: Hungarian

The Bercsenyi Hussars (Hungarian: Bercsenyi huszárok) is a 1940 Hungarian adventure film directed by Sándor Szlatinay and starring Zita Szeleczky, László Szilassy and Margit Makay. The film's sets were designed by the art director István Básthy.

== Cast ==
- Zita Szeleczky as Lichtenstein Éva
- László Szilassy as Kövess Péter fõhadnagy
- Margit Makay as özvegy báró Lichtenstein Félixné
- Gyula Csortos as Bagodi Gábor
- Piroska Vaszary as Clementine - nevelõn&otil
- Béla Mihályffi as Széplaky ezredes
- Valéria Hidvéghy as Betty
- Árpád Latabár as Lóversenyszurkoló
- Ilona Kökény as Róza néni
- Ferenc Pethes as Jóska, béres
- Ferenc Szécsi as Kolos, huszár
- Béla Fáy as Bartem - ulánus
- Gusztáv Pártos as Szállodaportás
- László Misoga as Pincér
- Lajos Sugár as Pincér

== Bibliography ==
- Frey, David. Jews, Nazis and the Cinema of Hungary: The Tragedy of Success, 1929-1944. Bloomsbury Publishing, 2017.
- Juhász, István. Kincses magyar filmtár 1931-1944: az eredeti forgatókönyvből 1931 és 1944 között létrejött hazai mozgóképekről. Kráter, 2007.
- Rîpeanu, Bujor. (ed.) International Directory of Cinematographers, Set- and Costume Designers in Film: Hungary (from the beginnings to 1988). Saur, 1981.
