= Dr. Kovács István =

1942 film

- Directed by: Viktor Bánky
- Written by: Sándor Hunyady (novel); István Fekete
- Starring: Antal Páger; Erzsi Simor; Júlia Tóth; Margit Ladomerszky
- Cinematography: Barnabás Hegyi
- Edited by: László Katonka
- Music by: Dezsõ Losonczy
- Production company: Magyar Film Iroda
- Release date: April 1942
- Running time: 94 minutes
- Country: Hungary
- Language: Hungarian

Dr. Kovács István is a 1942 Hungarian drama film directed by Viktor Bánky and starring Antal Páger, Erzsi Simor and Júlia Tóth. When his new wife from a peasant background is not accepted by his colleagues, a University Professor resigns his post and returns home to his rural village. After receiving popular support, he is returned to his position by the Minister of Education. The film was made during the Second World War and reflects the nationalist ideology of the country's government. The film's views show the influence of Hungarian Turanism. The film was popular with audiences on its release, and Bánky released a second nationalist film Changing the Guard the same year.

The production manager was Ernő Gottesmann.

== Main cast ==
- Antal Páger as Dr. Kovács István professor
- Erzsi Simor as Tatár Ada
- Júlia Tóth as Balogh Ágnes
- Margit Ladomerszky as Mrs. Tatár
- Piri Vaszary as Tailor
- Margit Vágóné as Mother of Dr. Kovács
- Gábor Rajnay as Dean of the Faculty
- Béla Mihályffi as Lakos Kálmán professzor
- György Kürthy as Tatár lawyer
- Tibor Puskás as Tatár Tibor, son of the lawyer
- Gyula Benkö as Holben, university student
- Lajos Gárday as Altiszt
- Mici Haraszti as Mrs. Lakos
- Hilda Gobbi as Milliner
- Marcsa Simon as Landlady of Dr. Kovács
- János Pásztor as Ferkó, junger brother of Dr. Kovács
- Lajos Sugár as Headwaiter

== Bibliography ==
- Cunningham, John. Hungarian Cinema: From Coffee House to Multiplex. Wallflower Press, 2004.
