= Sarajevo (1940 Hungarian film) =

1940 film

- Directed by: Ákos Ráthonyi
- Written by: Jenö Szatmári; Géza von Radványi
- Produced by: Antal Takács
- Starring: Maria von Tasnady; Ferenc Kiss; József Timár; Lajos Vértes
- Cinematography: Károly Vass
- Edited by: Zoltán Kerényi
- Music by: Szabolcs Fényes
- Production company: Hunnia Filmgyár
- Distributed by: Hunnia Filmgyár
- Release date: 2 September 1940
- Running time: 92 minutes
- Country: Hungary
- Language: Hungarian

Sarajevo is a 1940 Hungarian historical film directed by Ákos Ráthonyi and starring Maria von Tasnady, Ferenc Kiss and József Timár. The film is set against the backdrop of events leading up to the assassination of Archduke Franz Ferdinand of Austria in 1914.

== Partial cast ==
- Maria von Tasnady as Pogány Éva
- Ferenc Kiss as Sztepán Petrov
- József Timár as Borisz Boronow
- Lajos Vértes as Báró Várnay Miklós fõhadnagy
- Lili Berky as Nagymama
- Margit Ladomerszky as Alexandra
- Margit Selmeczy as Katja
- Mária Keresztessy as Irina
- Erzsi Orsolya as Cigányasszony
- Lenke Egyed as Márfa
- Marcsa Simon as Szakácsné
