= Wedding March (1944 film) =

1944 film

- László Szilassy and Zita Szeleczky in the film.
- Directed by: Zoltán Farkas
- Written by: Ferenc Fendrik
- Produced by: Péter Bajusz
- Starring: Zita Szeleczky; László Szilassy; Margit Lánczy
- Cinematography: Rudolf Icsey
- Edited by: Mária Vály
- Music by: Dénes Buday
- Production company: Hunnia Filmstúdió
- Release date: 10 December 1944
- Running time: 101 minutes
- Country: Hungary
- Language: Hungarian

Wedding March (Hungarian: Nászinduló) is a 1944 Hungarian drama film directed by Zoltán Farkas and starring Zita Szeleczky, László Szilassy and Margit Lánczy. It was shot at the Hunnia Studios in Budapest. The film's sets were designed by the art director János Pagonyi.

== Cast ==
- Zita Szeleczky as Éva
- László Szilassy as Horváth Miklós
- Margit Lánczy as Mayor's wife
- György Kürthy as Mayor
- Tibor Puskás as Dósa Álmos
- Sári Déry as Helén
- Zoltán Makláry as Bálint, Teacher
- Livia Kollár as Ladyship
- Jenö Danis as Mr. Kilicsi, Custodian
- Gyula Szabó as Latin teacher
- István Falussy as Helén's servant
- Marcsa Simon
- Gusztáv Vándory
- László Misoga

== Bibliography ==
- Juhász, István. Kincses magyar filmtár 1931-1944: az eredeti forgatókönyvből 1931 és 1944 között létrejött hazai mozgóképekről. Kráter, 2007.
- Pór, Katalin. De Budapest à Hollywood: le théâtre hongrois à Hollywood, 1930-1943. Presses universitaires de Rennes, 2010.
- Rîpeanu, Bujor. (ed.) International Directory of Cinematographers, Set- and Costume Designers in Film: Hungary (from the beginnings to 1988). Saur, 1981.
