= Mici Haraszti =

Hungarian actress

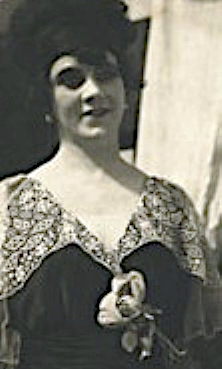
- Haraszti, c. 1910s
- Born: Mária Hinkelmann; 25 June 1882; Trencsén, Austria-Hungary (now Trenčín, Slovakia)
- Died: 18 February 1964 (aged 81); Budapest, Hungary
- Occupation: Actress

Mici Haraszti (born Mária Hinkelmann; 25 June 1882 – 18 February 1964) was a Hungarian actress.

She was born in Trencsén, Austria-Hungary (now Trenčín, Slovakia), and died in Budapest, Hungary.

== Selected filmography ==
- The Officer's Swordknot (1915)
- Hyppolit, the Butler (1931)
- Everything for the Woman (1934)
- I May See Her Once a Week (1937)
- The Wrong Man (1938)
- No Coincidence (1939)
- Three Bells (1941)
- Dr. Kovács István (1942)
- Mouse in the Palace (1943)
- The Night Girl (1943)
- African Bride (1944)
- Boy or Girl? (1944)
- Strange Roads (1944)

== Bibliography ==
- Kulik, Karol. Alexander Korda: The Man Who Could Work Miracles. Virgin Books, 1990.
