= László Kalmár (director) =

Hungarian film director

- Born: 16 December 1900; Budapest, Austro-Hungarian Empire
- Died: 30 May 1980 (aged 79); Budapest, Hungary
- Occupations: Director, Screenwriter
- Years active: 1936–1963 (film)

László Kalmár (1900–1980) was a Hungarian screenwriter and film director. He began his career in the Horthy era, learning his craft as an assistant director before directing his first film in 1939. His melodrama Flames was screened at the 1941 Venice Film Festival. He was able to continue his career at the end of the Second World War, unlike many other Hungarian filmmakers, and transitioned to working under the new Communist regime.

== Selected filmography ==
- Kind Stepmother (1935)
- Bence Uz (1938)
- Deadly Spring (1939)
- No Coincidence (1939)
- Semmelweis (1940)
- Dankó Pista (1940)
- Mirage by the Lake (1940)
- Prince Bob (1941)
- Flames (1941)
- Silenced Bells (1941)
- Deadly Kiss (1942)
- Lóránd Fráter (1942)
- A Heart Stops Beating (1942)
- The Dance of Death (1942)
- Black Dawn (1943)
- Siamese Cat (1943)
- Déryné (1951)
- Leila and Gábor (1956)

== Bibliography ==
- Burns, Bryan. World Cinema: Hungary. Fairleigh Dickinson Univ Press, 1996.
- Cunningham, John. Hungarian Cinema: From Coffee House to Multiplex. Wallflower Press, 2004.
