= Mária Keresztessy =

Hungarian actress (1908–1977)

- Born: 25 June 1908; Miskolc, Austria-Hungary
- Died: 29 May 1977 (aged 68); Budapest, Hungary
- Occupation: Actress
- Years active: 1938–1977 (film and TV)

Mária Keresztessy (25 June 1908 – 29 May 1977) was a Hungarian stage, film and television actress. She appeared at a variety of theatres across Hungary. In film and television she appeared in supporting roles as a character actress.

== Selected filmography ==
- Two Prisoners (1938)
- Wedding in Toprin (1939)
- Landslide (1940)
- Sarajevo (1940)
- Silenced Bells (1941)
- A Woman Looks Back (1942)
- Lóránd Fráter (1942)
- Male Fidelity (1942)
- Déryné (1951)
- Fourteen Lives (1954)
- The Bridge of Life (1956)
- What a Night! (1958)
- Crime at Dawn (1960)
- Be True Until Death (1960)
- Lady-Killer in Trouble (1964)

== Bibliography ==
- Kulcsár, István Karcsai & Veress József. Magyar filmkalauz: negyven év száz magyar nagyjátékfilmje. Magyar Filmintézet, 1985.
- Laura, Ernesto G. Tutti i film di Venezia, 1932–1984. La Biennale, Settore cinema e spettacolo televisivo, 1985.
- Székely, György & Gajdó, Tamás. Magyar színháztörténet: 1920-1949. Akadémiai Kiadó, 1990.
