= The Gyurkovics Boys =

1941 film

- Directed by: Dezső Ákos Hamza
- Written by: István Békeffy
- Based on: The Gyurkovics Boys by Ferenc Herczeg
- Produced by: István Erdélyi
- Starring: László Szilassy; Ida Turay; Erzsi Simor
- Cinematography: Árpád Makay
- Edited by: Zoltán Farkas
- Music by: Tibor Polgár
- Production company: Hamza Film
- Distributed by: Kárpát Film
- Release date: 14 August 1941
- Running time: 101 minutes
- Country: Hungary
- Language: Hungarian

The Gyurkovics Boys (Hungarian: Gyurkovics fiúk) is a 1941 Hungarian comedy film directed by Dezső Ákos Hamza and starring László Szilassy, Ida Turay and Erzsi Simor. It is an adaptation of the 1895 novel of the same title by Ferenc Herczeg, a sequel to his earlier work The Gyurkovics Girls. The film's sets were designed by the art director János Pagonyi.

== Cast ==
- Mariska Vízváry as Gyurkovics mama
- László Szilassy as Gyurkovics Géza
- László Perényi as Gyurkovics Milán
- Endre C. Turáni as Gyurkovics András
- Gyula Benkő as Gyurkovics Gyurks
- Tibor Puskás as Gyurkovics Sándorka
- Kálmán Rózsahegyi as Nektáriusz bácsi
- Gábor Rajnay as Brenóczy ezredes
- Margit Árpád as Brenóczy felesége, a szép Poldi
- Ida Turay as Jutka, Brenóczy lánya
- Artúr Somlay as Hetwitz tábornok
- Erzsi Simor as Clarisse
- Miklós Hajmássy as Dumba, osztrák gárdatiszt
- Jenő Pataky as Dénes, államtitkár
- Zoltán Makláry as Zugligeti Lajos, újságíró
- Ferenc Szécsi as Kovács hadnagy
- Bea Egerváry as Orfeum táncosnõ
- Lenke Egyed as Cservenyákné
- Andor Sárossy as Részeg vendég
- Attila Egressy as Egy diák

== Bibliography ==
- Cunningham, John. Hungarian Cinema: From Coffee House to Multiplex. Wallflower Press, 2004.
- Juhász, István. Kincses magyar filmtár 1931-1944: az eredeti forgatókönyvből 1931 és 1944 között létrejött hazai mozgóképekről. Kráter, 2007.
- Rîpeanu, Bujor. (ed.) International Directory of Cinematographers, Set- and Costume Designers in Film: Hungary (from the beginnings to 1988). Saur, 1981.
