= The Perfect Man (1939 film) =

1939 film

- Directed by: Sándor Szlatinay
- Written by: Attila Orbók; János Zalabéri Horváth
- Produced by: Ernõ Teichmann; János Zalabéri Horváth
- Starring: Pál Jávor; Erzsi Simor; Tivadar Bilicsi
- Cinematography: Rudolf Icsey
- Edited by: Zoltán Farkas
- Music by: Sándor Szlatinay
- Production company: Standard Film
- Release date: 31 August 1939
- Running time: 69 minutes
- Country: Hungary
- Language: Hungarian

The Perfect Man (Hungarian: Tökéletes férfi) is a 1939 Hungarian comedy film directed by Sándor Szlatinay and starring Pál Jávor, Erzsi Simor and Tivadar Bilicsi.

== Main cast ==
- Pál Jávor as Bardó Gábor, landed gentleman
- Erzsi Simor as Hámor Dolly
- Tivadar Bilicsi as Csatári, actor
- Sándor Pethes as Dr. Leonidas, bank secretary
- Béla Mihályffi as Hámor Ödön, bank president
- Etelka Dán as Mosóczy Sári
- Zoltán Makláry as Mosóczy
- György Kürthy as Bardó Gáspár
- Ferenc Pethes as Feri
- Ilka Petur as Mrs. Szebenyi
- Zoltán Várkonyi as batty man
- Erzsi Orsolya as cosmetician
- Ilona Kökény as Mrs. Csatáry
- Géza Márky as Jimmy dancer
- Lajos Sugár as editor in chief
- Terus Kováts as unemployment typist
- Ilonka Szép as reporter
- László Misoga as Dr. Holubán customer
- Margit Zsilley as Mari
- Zsuzsa Simon as guest in Bar
- Sándor Deák as waiter

== Bibliography ==
- Bujor Rîpeanu. Hungary (from the beginnings to 1988). Walter de Gruyter, 1989.
