= Erzsi Orsolya =

Hungarian actress (1901–1984)

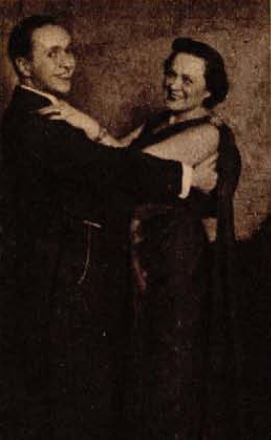
- Orsolya with writer Rónai Mihály András in 1938
- Born: 6 November 1901; Budapest, Austria-Hungary
- Died: 13 May 1984 (aged 82); Budapest, Hungary
- Occupation: Actress
- Years active: 1936–1980 (film & TV)

Erzsi Orsolya (6 November 1901 – 13 May 1984) was a Hungarian stage, film and television actress. A character actress, she appeared regularly in supporting roles on screen from the mid-1930s onwards.

== Selected filmography ==
- Be True Until Death (1936)
- All Men Are Crazy (1937)
- Rézi Friday (1938)
- The Henpecked Husband (1938)
- Princess of the Puszta (1939)
- Money Is Coming (1939)
- The Perfect Man (1939)
- Queen Elizabeth (1940)
- Sarajevo (1940)
- The Talking Robe (1942)
- Mountain Girl (1942)
- At the Crossroads (1942)
- Happy Times (1943)
- Rózsa Nemes (1943)
- The Three Doves (1944)
- Underground Colony (1951)
- The State Department Store (1953)
- Crime at Dawn (1960)
- A Handful of Heroes (1967)
- Forbidden Ground (1968)
- Love (1971)
- Cats' Play (1972)

== Bibliography ==
- Cardullo, Bert. European Directors and Their Films: Essays on Cinema. Scarecrow Press, 2012.
- Petrie, Graham. History Must Answer to Man: The Contemporary Hungarian Cinema. Corvina Kiadó, 1981.
- Székely, György & Gajdó, Tamás. Magyar színháztörténet: 1920-1949. Akadémiai Kiadó, 1990.
