= Hello, Peter! =

1939 film

- Directed by: Sándor Szlatinay
- Written by: László Segesdy
- Based on: Servus Peter play by Károly Nóti
- Produced by: István Erdélyi
- Starring: Antal Páger; Erzsi Simor; Sándor Pethes
- Cinematography: Rudolf Icsey
- Edited by: Zoltán Farkas
- Music by: Zoltán Pásztor; Sándor Szlatinay
- Release date: 29 March 1939
- Running time: 84 minutes
- Country: Hungary
- Language: Hungarian

Hello, Peter! (Hungarian: Szervusz Péter!) is a 1939 Hungarian comedy film directed by Sándor Szlatinay and starring Antal Páger, Erzsi Simor and Sándor Pethes. The film's sets were designed by the art director József Simoncsics. It was based on a play by Károly Nóti, and was later remade as the 1951 West German film Czardas of Hearts, also directed by Szlatinay.

== Synopsis ==
Endre, an electrical engineer, is mistaken for the celebrity Péter who asks him to swap roles for a while.

== Cast ==
- Antal Páger as Tamás Endre / Tornay Péter
- Erzsi Simor as Tornay Éva
- Sándor Pethes as Ferenc, Tornay inasa
- Valéria Hidvéghy as Lány a mosodából
- Béla Mihályffi as Lóránt bácsi
- Ferenc Pethes as Fábri bácsi
- Gyula Szöreghy as Magánnyomozó
- Etelka Dán as Takács Gizi
- Sári Déry as Tornay Péter barátnõje

== Bibliography ==
- Juhász, István. Kincses magyar filmtár 1931-1944: az eredeti forgatókönyvből 1931 és 1944 között létrejött hazai mozgóképekről. Kráter, 2007.
- Rîpeanu, Bujor. (ed.) International Directory of Cinematographers, Set- and Costume Designers in Film: Hungary (from the beginnings to 1988). Saur, 1981.
