= Sándor Szlatinay =

Hungarian film director

- Born: 25 December 1899; Lugos, Austro-Hungarian Empire
- Died: 22 October 1980 (aged 80); West Germany
- Occupations: Director, Composer
- Years active: 1936–1955 (film)

Sándor Szlatinay (December 29, 1899 – October 22, 1980) was a Hungarian composer and film director. He was born in the Austro-Hungarian Empire and worked in the Hungarian, Italian film industries. After the Second World War he settled in West Germany. Later in his career he was credited as Alexander von Slatinay.

== Selected filmography ==
- Kind Stepmother (1935)
- Thanks for Knocking Me Down (1935)
- Three Dragons (1936)
- I May See Her Once a Week (1937)
- My Daughter Is Different (1937)
- Billeting (1938)
- The Perfect Man (1939)
- Hello, Peter! (1939)
- The Hussar Captain (1940)
- The Last of the Vereczkeys (1940)
- The Bercsenyi Hussars (1940)
- Much Ado About Emmi (1940)
- The Marsh Flower (1943)
- I'll Make You Happy (1949)
- Czardas of Hearts (1951)
- Woe to Him Who Loves (1951)
- Wenn eine Wienerin Walzer tanzt (1951)
- Three Men in the Snow (1955)

== Bibliography ==
- Cunningham, John. Hungarian Cinema: From Coffee House to Multiplex. Wallflower Press, 2004.
- Frey, David. Jews, Nazis and the Cinema of Hungary: The Tragedy of Success, 1929-1944. Bloomsbury Publishing, 2017.
