= Ákos Ráthonyi =

Hungarian film director (1908–1969)

- Born: 26 March 1908; Budapest, Hungary
- Died: 6 January 1969 (aged 60); Munich, West Germany
- Other name: Akos von Ratony
- Occupations: Film director Screenwriter
- Years active: 1936–1968
- Spouse: Klári Tolnay
- Children: Zsuzsanna Ráthonyi

Ákos Ráthonyi (26 March 1908 – 6 January 1969) was a Hungarian film director and screenwriter. He directed 42 films between 1936 and 1968. He was born in Budapest, Hungary and died in Munich, West Germany. He is widely considered one of the most prominent Hungarian filmmakers of his time.

== Selected filmography ==
- Dream Love (1935)
- Pay Up, Madam! (1937)
- There Are Exceptions (1937)
- The Lady Is a Bit Cracked (1938)
- Wildflowers of Gyimes (1939)
- Sarajevo (1940)
- Left-Handed Angel (1941)
- Katyi (1942)
- Once a Week (1942)
- Kádár Versus Kerekes (1942)
- Muki (1944)
- Renee XIV (1946, uncompleted)
- Unknown Sender (1950)
- You Have to be Beautiful (1951)
- Don't Blame the Stork (1954)
- Mrs. Warren's Profession (1960)
- The Devil's Daffodil (1961)
- Beloved Impostor (1961)
- The Phony American (1961)
- Cave of the Living Dead (1964)
- Take Off Your Clothes, Doll (1968)
