= István Erdélyi =

Hungarian film producer

- Born: 22 December 1902 (age 123); Budapest, Austro-Hungarian Empire
- Occupation: Producer
- Years active: c.1936–1944 (film)

István Erdélyi (born 1902) was a Hungarian film producer. Active in the Hungarian film industry during the 1930s and 1940s, he founded the production and distribution company Kárpát Film and was a leader of the industry body OMME. He opposed the Anti-Jewish Laws imposed by the Hungarian government as harmful to the film industry, and sought approval to continue employing Jewish filmmakers such as Karoly Noti.

== Selected filmography ==
- Tomi (1936)
- Hello, Peter! (1939)
- Matthew Arranges Things (1940)
- The Bercsenyi Hussars (1940)
- The Gyurkovics Boys (1941)
- The Perfect Family (1942)
- A Message from the Volga Shore (1942)
- The Marsh Flower (1943)
- African Bride (1944)

== Bibliography ==
- Frey, David. Jews, Nazis and the Cinema of Hungary: The Tragedy of Success, 1929-1944. Bloomsbury Publishing, 2017.
