= Béla Mihályffi =

Hungarian actor

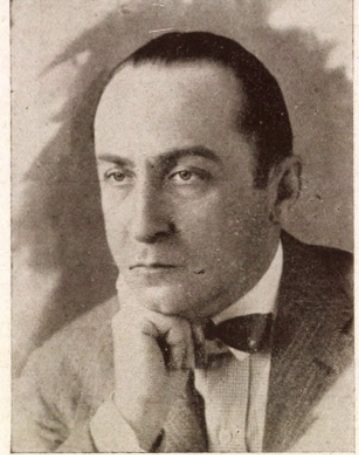
- Mihályffi in 1930
- Born: 14 January 1891; Budapest, Austro-Hungarian Empire
- Died: 4 April 1948 (aged 57); Budapest, Hungary
- Occupation: Actor
- Years active: 1933–1944 (film)

Béla Mihályffi (January 14, 1891 – April 4, 1948) was a Hungarian stage and film actor. A character actor, he played supporting roles in more than sixty films during the 1930s and 1940s.

== Selected filmography ==
- Stolen Wednesday (1933)
- 120 Kilometres an Hour (1937)
- The Mysterious Stranger (1937)
- Mother (1937)
- Lady Seeks a Room (1937)
- The Wrong Man (1938)
- Two Prisoners (1938)
- I Defended a Woman (1938)
- The Poor Rich (1938)
- The Perfect Man (1939)
- Istvan Bors (1939)
- The Minister's Friend (1939)
- No Coincidence (1939)
- Six Weeks of Happiness (1939)
- The Ball Is On (1939)
- Hello, Peter! (1939)
- Semmelweis (1940)
- The Bercsenyi Hussars (1940)
- You Are the Song (1940)
- Cserebere (1940)
- The Chequered Coat (1940)
- Unknown Opponent (1940)
- Rózsafabot (1940)
- Closed Court (1940)
- Dankó Pista (1940)
- András (1941)
- Three Bells (1941)
- Flames (1941)
- The Marriage Market (1941)
- Europe Doesn't Answer (1941)
- Taken by the Flood (1941)
- Today, Yesterday and Tomorrow (1941)
- Sister Beáta (1941)
- Finally! (1941)
- The Devil Doesn't Sleep (1941)
- Property for Sale (1941)
- Entry Forbidden (1941)
- Costume Ball (1942)
- The Talking Robe (1942)
- Male Fidelity (1942)
- Dr. Kovács István (1942)
- Changing the Guard (1942)
- The Song of Rákóczi (1943)
- A Lover of the Theatre (1944)
- Strange Roads (1944)

== Bibliography ==
- Székely, György & Gajdó, Tamás. Magyar színháztörténet: 1920-1949. Akadémiai Kiadó, 1990.
