= József Juhász =

Hungarian actor

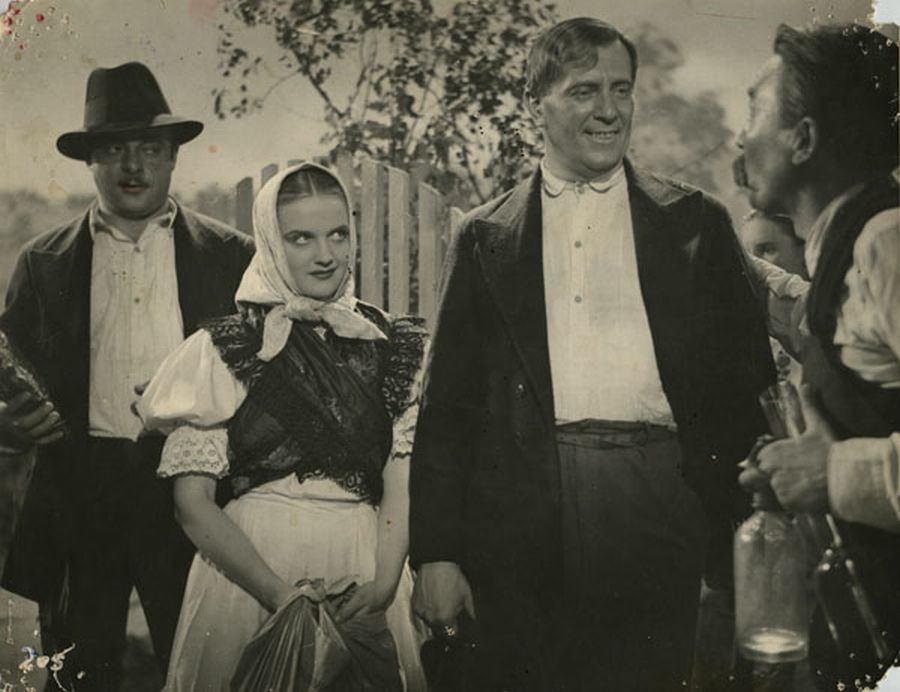
- Juhász (left) in Flower of the Tisza (1939)
- Born: 4 July 1908; Kemecse, Austro-Hungarian Empire
- Died: 24 June 1974 (aged 65); Toronto, Ontario; Canada
- Occupation: Actor
- Years active: 1936-1956 (film)

József Juhász (4 July 1908 – 24 June 1974) was a Hungarian stage and film actor. He appeared in more than fifty films during his career including Marika (1938). He emigrated to Canada following the defeat of the Hungarian Revolution of 1956 which he had supported.

== Selected filmography ==
- Three Dragons (1936)
- Be True Until Death (1936)
- The Borrowed Castle (1937)
- Beauty of the Pusta (1937)
- There Are Exceptions (1937)
- Modern Girls (1937)
- Marika (1938)
- Rézi Friday (1938)
- Flower of the Tisza (1939)
- No Coincidence (1939)
- Rózsafabot (1940)
- Queen Elizabeth (1940)
- Semmelweis (1940)
- Seven Plum Trees (1940)
- Closed Court (1940)
- Entry Forbidden (1941)
- A Bowl of Lentils (1941)
- Don't Ask Who I Was (1941)
- The Devil Doesn't Sleep (1941)
- Silenced Bells (1941)
- Today, Yesterday and Tomorrow (1941)
- Old Waltz (1941)
- Katyi (1942)
- The Dance of Death (1942)
- Borrowed Husbands (1942)
- Cadet Love (1942)
- The Talking Robe (1942)
- Deadly Kiss (1942)
- Suburban Guard Post (1943)
- Quite a Lad (1943)
- Knock on the Window (1944)
- A Plane Has Not Returned (1944)
- Honesty and Glory (1951)
- Underground Colony (1951)
- The Land Is Ours (1951)
- The First Swallows (1953)
- Love Travels by Coach (1955)
