= László Földényi (actor) =

Hungarian actor (1895–1960)

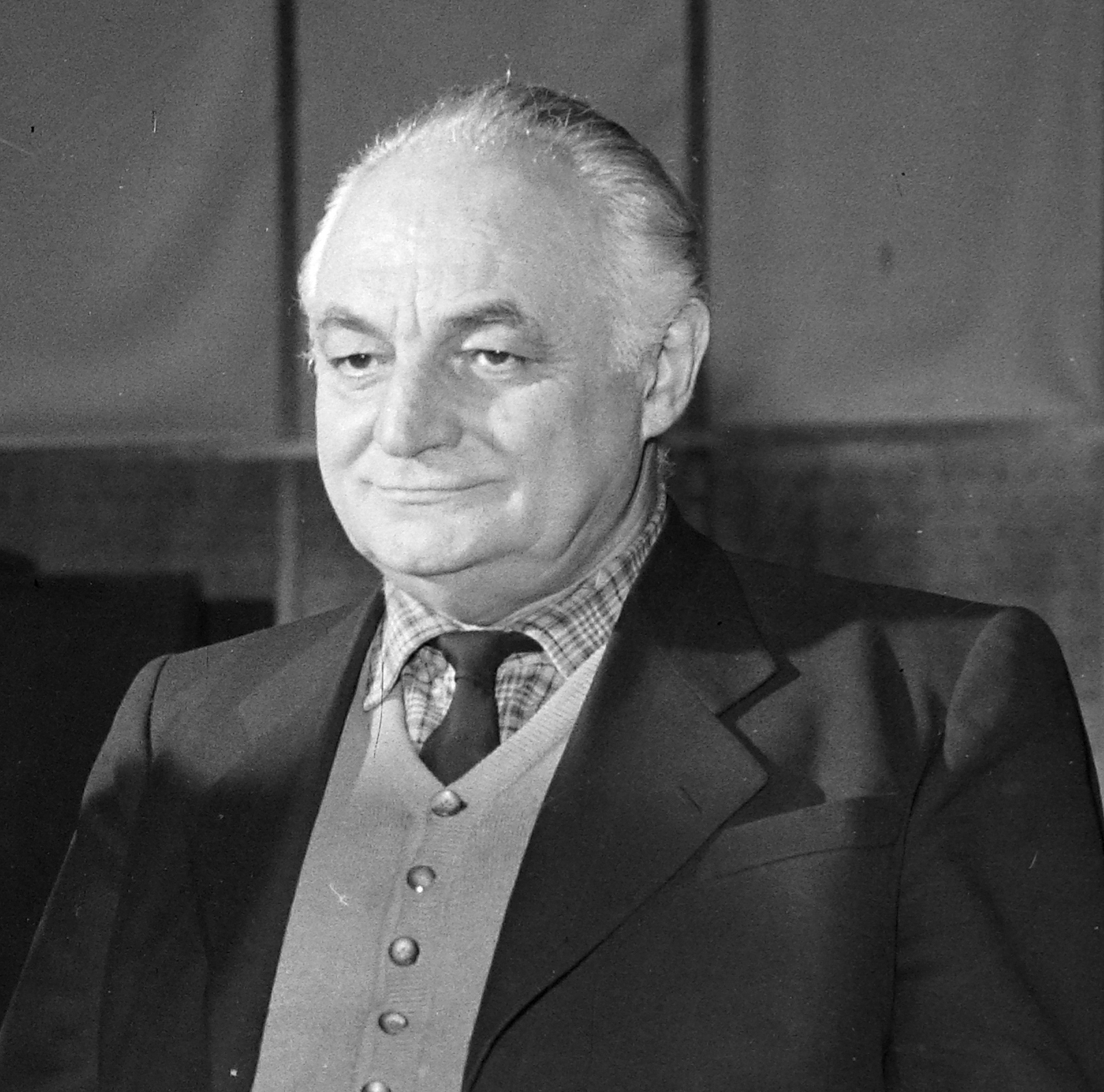
- Földényi in 1959.
- Born: 18 October 1895; Gödöllő, Austro-Hungarian Empire
- Died: 25 July 1960 (aged 64); Alsóörs, Hungary
- Occupation: Actor
- Years active: 1935–1960 (film)

László Földényi (1895–1960) was a Hungarian stage and film actor. He appeared at a variety of different theatres including the Comedy Theatre in Budapest. He played supporting roles, sometimes as villains, in Hungarian cinema from the pre-war Horthy era to the Communist period.

== Selected filmography ==
- Budapest Pastry Shop (1935)
- Be True Until Death (1936)
- Help, I'm an Heiress (1937)
- Lady Seeks a Room (1937)
- My Daughter Is Different (1937)
- Two Prisoners (1938)
- The Ball Is On (1939)
- Money Is Coming (1939)
- Istvan Bors (1939)
- Unknown Opponent (1940)
- Silenced Bells (1941)
- The Marriage Market (1941)
- Entry Forbidden (1941)
- Old Waltz (1941)
- Left-Handed Angel (1941)
- Tavaszi szonáta (1942)
- Sabotage (1942)
- Wildfire (1944)
- Gala Suit (1949)
- Hot Fields (1949)
- Underground Colony (1951)
- A harag napja (1953)
- La belle et le tzigane (1958)
- Up the Slope (1959)

== Bibliography ==
- Paietta, Ann C.. Saints, Clergy and Other Religious Figures on Film and Television, 1895–2003. McFarland, 2005.
- Székely, György & Gajdó, Tamás. Magyar színháztörténet: 1920-1949. Akadémiai Kiadó, 1990.
