= Erzsi Simor =

Hungarian actress (1913–1977)

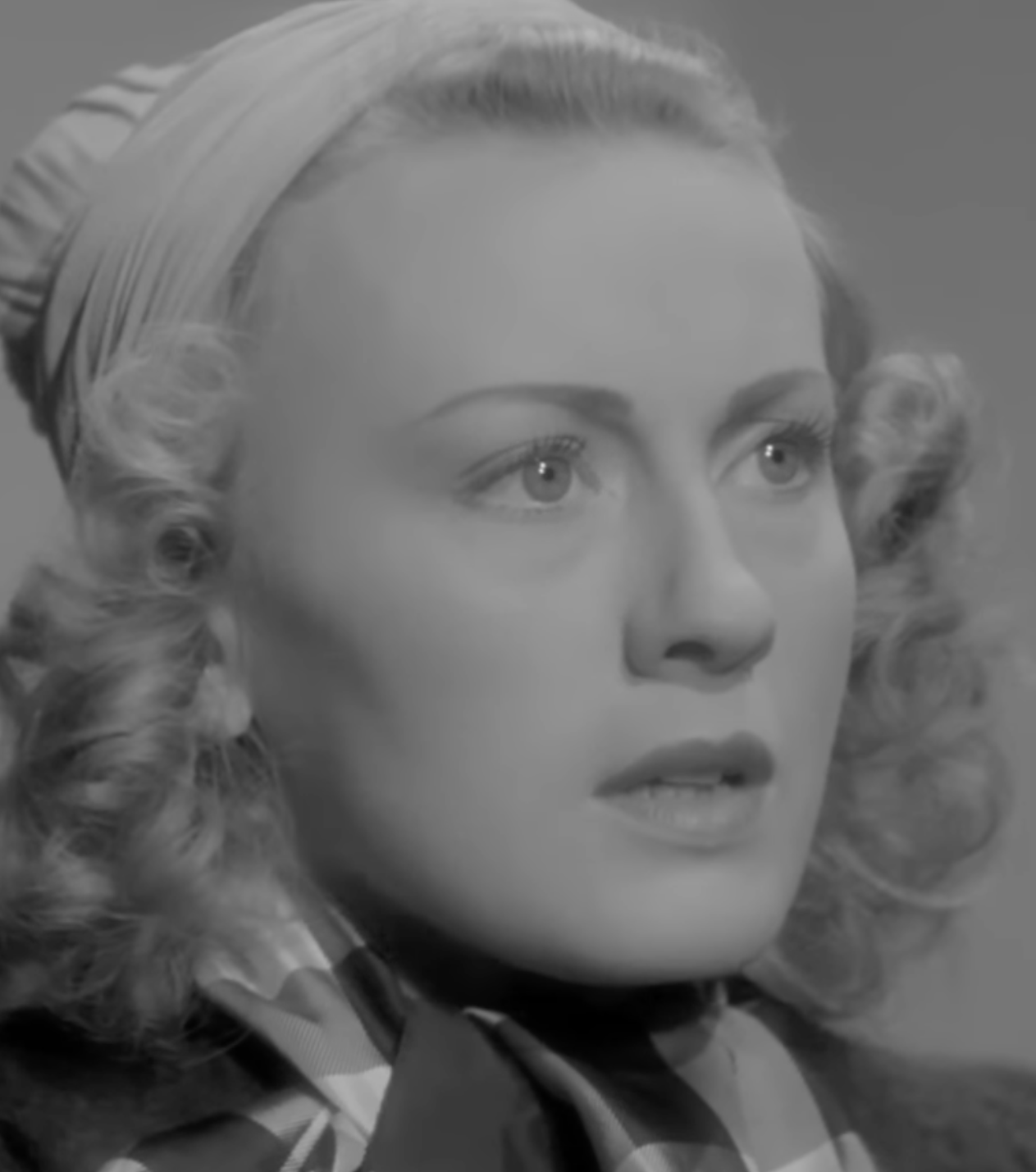
- Simor in Two Hearts (1943)
- Born: Erzsébet Mária Terézia Porteller; 6 July 1911; Budapest, Austria-Hungary
- Died: 2 February 1977 (aged 65); Budapest, Hungary
- Occupation: Actress
- Years active: 1936–1977
- Spouse(s): Streitmann Kornél (1931–1943); Kovács Károly (1943–?); Nagy Béla (1954–?)

Erzsi Simor (born Erzsébet Mária Terézia Porteller; 6 July 1911 – 2 February 1977) was a Hungarian film actress.

== Filmography ==
Year	Title	Role	Notes
1936	Tomi	Gáldy Benedek lánya	
1937	Help, I'm an Heiress	Grófné	
1937	Méltóságos kisasszony	Ápolónõ	
1938	Young Noszty and Mary Toth	Noszty Vilma	
1938	The Wrong Man	Losonczy Ágnes	
1938	Cifra nyomoruság (Uri világ)	Lili, Felicián lánya	
1938	Varjú a toronyórán	Mária	
1939	Janos the Valiant	Burkus királylány	
1939	Wild Rose	Mária, Sziráky titkárnõje	
1939	Hello, Peter!	Tornay Éva	
1939	Stars of Variety	Alice McLean	
1939	The Perfect Man	Hámor Dolly	
1939	The Ball Is On	Viera Gorbuskin	
1940	Semmelweis	Mici	
1940	Garszonlakás kiadó	Klári, Kenessey lánya	
1940	Dankó Pista	Jáky Ilonka	
1940	Unknown Opponent	Adrienne	
1940	Mirage by the Lake	Máté Gitta	
1941	Taken by the Flood	Sylvia	
1941	The Relative of His Excellency	Klára	
1941	The Gyurkovics Boys	Clarisse	
1941	Csákó és kalap	Erzsike, Udvardy lánya	
1941	Prince Bob	Xénia Viktória hercegnõ	
1941	Szüts Mara házassága	Szûts Mara	
1941	Entry Forbidden	Juliska, varrólány	
1942	The Last Song	Erzsébet, zongorakisérõ	
1942	Borrowed Husbands	Kelecsényi Erzsike	
1942	Dr. Kovács István	Tatár Ada	
1942	Sabotage	Mariska	
1942	A 2000 pengös férfi	Csibi	
1942	A régi nyár	Páldi Éva, Ria lánya	
1942	We'll Know By Midnight	Donáthné	
1942	Bajtársak	Judit	
1943	Two Hearts	Anna Serrati	
1943	La vita torna	Elena Lorini	
1943	Together	Zsuzsanna	
1943	Rózsa Nemes	Veszprémy Lona	
1943	The White Train	Mária	
1944	A látszat csal	Zimonyi Eszter - San Salvador grófnõ	
1944	Masterless Woman	Éva, Pártos felesége	
1958	Danse Macabre		
1958	Édes Anna	Moviszterné	
1960	Alázatosan jelentem		
1960	A Husband for Susy		
1963	Meztelen diplomata		Uncredited
1964	Pacsirta	Etelka néni	
1964	Ha egyszer, húsz év múlva...	Tatayné	
1964	Mit csinált Felséged 3-tól 5-ig?		
1966	Hideg napok	Ballayné	
1970	Szép magyar komédia		
1973	A magyar ugaron	Igazgatónõ	
1974	A Pendragon legenda	Lady Malmsbury Croft	
1976	The Phantom on Horseback	A fõbíró felesége	
