= Ferenc Kiss (actor) =

Hungarian actor

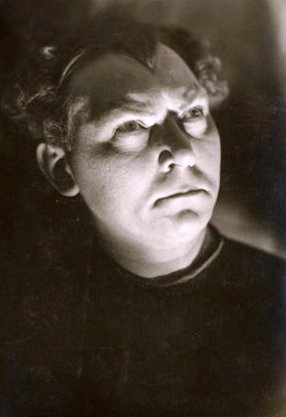
- Born: 16 April 1892; Székesfehérvár, Austria-Hungary
- Died: 13 August 1978 (aged 86); Budapest, Hungary
- Occupation: Actor
- Years active: 1921-1977

Ferenc Kiss (16 April 1892 – 13 August 1978) was a Hungarian actor. He appeared in more than fifty films from 1921 to 1977.

== Antisemitism ==
He was the first President of the Hungarian Film Chamber and was outspokenly antisemitic at a time when Anti-Jewish Laws were restricting Hungarian Jews from participating in the Hungarian Film Industry. At his trial in December 1945 following the Second World War he insisted he was following the will of his members.

== Selected filmography ==
Year	Title	Role	Notes
1936	Cafe Moscow	Baklusin szárnysegéd	
1940	Landslide	Böbek Samu	
1940	Sarajevo	Sztepán Petrov	
1941	The Talking Robe	Mihály Lestyák	
1959	A Game with Love	Jupiter	
1963	Drama of the Lark	Bankigazgató	

== Bibliography ==
- Frey, David. Jews, Nazis and the Cinema of Hungary: The Tragedy of Success, 1929-1944. Bloomsbury Publishing, 2017.
