= Mester Film =

Hungarian film company

Mester Film was a Hungarian film production company established in Budapest in July 1938. It was founded by Miklós Mester, a politician and public official, with the backing of the German Fritz Kreisle as part of a plan by Nazi Germany to gain greater influence over the Hungarian film industry. A major goal was to remove the strong presence of Hungarian Jews in the country's film industry, a major source of contention for Germany, who pushed for greater antisemitic discrimination. Mester Film promoted the careers of non-Jewish filmmakers and actors.

The German financing allowed Mester to produce four initial films, two of which Bence Uz and Dankó Pista were major hits at the box office. This allowed Mester to emerge as one of Hungary's most successful production companies of the early 1940s. Its films were shot at the Hunnia Studios in Budapest.

== Bibliography ==
- Frey, David. Jews, Nazis and the Cinema of Hungary: The Tragedy of Success, 1929-1944. Bloomsbury Publishing, 2017.
- Winkel, Roel Vande & Welch, David (ed.) Cinema and the Swastika: The International Expansion of Third Reich Cinema. Palgrave MacMillan, 2011.
