= Hunnia Film Studio =

Hungarian film studio active 1928–1948

Coordinates: 47°29′N 19°03′E

- Founded: 19 December 1928
- Defunct: 18 August 1948

Hunnia Film Studio was the largest and most significant sound film studio in Hungary until its nationalization in 1948. Its predecessor, Corvin Film Studio, founded by Alexander Korda in 1917, was the most important Hungarian silent film company, while its successor, Mafilm, became the largest Hungarian film company, still operating today.

== Foundation ==
Corvin Film Studio was purchased at an auction by the state-founded Filmipari Alap (Film Industry Fund). On December 19, 1928, Hunnia Film Factory was founded in Budapest.

Prime Minister István Bethlen was determined to consolidate the Hungarian film industry and restore its old prestige. Therefore, the film factory was equipped with the most modern German technology. The rebuilt studio was handed over on April 28, 1931. The next day Kék Bálvány, the first Hungarian sound film, was shot.

== Golden age ==
By the early 1940s, Hungary had become the third largest film production country in Europe as well as Hungary's largest film factory, with seven studios and 1,300 workers. From its foundation, some 20 million meters of film had been shot, and the average budget was 400,000 pengő.

== War ==
In the closing months of the Second World War Hungary's ruling Arrow Cross regime planned to dismantle the studio and move it westwards, but this plan was wrecked when the Soviet Red Army captured Budapest. In the end, the Second World War did not spare Hunnia, all of whose studios were bombed.

== Resurrection ==
The war was not over, but Budapest's leadership with Mayor János Csorba at the forefront had begun rebuilding the main studio, which returned to the top of European film production. On October 2, 1945, film production resumed in Hunnia's Korda Studio for the first time after the Second World War. The first film was The Schoolmistress, based on Sándor Bródy's play A tanítónő. After that, however, very few films were made until nationalization. Of these, Valahol Európában (1947) directed by Géza Radványi was a notable success.

== Nationalization ==
On August 18, 1948, Hunnia was nationalized. Since then, it has continued to function as Mafilm.

== Note ==
Hunnia Film Studio as above should not be confused with the earlier Hunnia Studio that operated for two years from 1911. Later, Hunnia studios were formed several times within Mafilm.

== Filmography ==
Hunnia's films in chronological order

=== Hunnia's self-produced films ===
1. A kék bálvány (1931, Schiffer Miksával)
2. A vén gazember (1932, magyar-német, UFA-val)
3. Pardon, tévedtem! (1933, magyar-amerikai-német, Deutsche Universal Filmmel)
4. Rád bízom a feleségem (1937, Objectiv Filmmel)
5. Cifra nyomorúság (1938, Budapest Filmmel)
6. 13 kislány mosolyog az égre (1938, Hajdu Filmmel)
7. A varieté csillagai (1938, magyar-német, Pictura Film Kft.-vel és Pictura Film Gmbh-val)
8. 5 óra 40 (1939, Takács Filmmel)
9. Két lány az utcán (1939, Photophon Filmmel)
10. Áll a bál (1939, Hajdú Filmmel)
11. Hat hét boldogság (1939, Takács Filmmel)
12. A nőnek mindig sikerül (1939, Mester Filmmel)
13. Sarajevo (1940, Takács Filmmel)
14. Dankó Pista (1940, Mester Filmmel)
15. Ismeretlen ellenfél (1940, Vörösmarty Filmmel)
16. Igen vagy nem? (1940, Hajdú Filmmel)
17. Lángok (1940, Takács Filmmel)
18. Muzsikáló május (1941, rövid)
19. Bob herceg (1941, Hausz Filmmel)
20. Egy éjszaka Erdélyben (1941, Takács Filmmel)
21. Emberek a havason (1942, Modern Filmmel)
22. Házasság (1942)
23. Negyedíziglen (1942)
24. Pista tekintetes úr (1942, Hajdú Filmmel)
25. Tilos a szerelem (1943)
26. Éjjeli zene (1943)
27. És a vakok látnak... (1943, Hosszú Filmmel)
28. Rákóczi nótája (1943, Hajdú Filmmel)
29. Sári bíró (1943)
30. Nászinduló (1943, Bajusz Péterrel)
31. Madách - Egy ember tragédiája (1944, Fáklya Filmmel)
32. Két vonat között (1944, rövid, Riomfalvy Pállal és Simon Józseffel)
33. A két Bajthay (1944)
34. A tanítónő (1945)

=== Films made but not produced by Hunnia ===
1. A kék bálvány (1931)
2. Hyppolit, a lakáj (1931)
3. Piri mindent tud (1932)
4. Tokaji rapszódia (1938)
5. Egy lány elindul (1938)
6. Marika (1938)
7. Az elcserélt ember (1938)
8. Az ember néha téved (1938)
9. A falu rossza (1938)
10. Örök titok (1938)
11. Pillanatnyi pénzzavar (1938)
12. Magdát kicsapják (1938)
13. Döntő pillanat (1938)
14. Úri világ (1938)
15. Megvédtem egy asszonyt(1938)
16. Péntek Rézi (1938)
17. Uz Bence (1938)
18. Beszállásolás (1938)
19. Szegény gazdagok (1938)
20. Nincsenek véletlenek (1938)
21. A piros bugyelláris (1938)
22. Azurexpress (1938)
23. A hölgy egy kissé bogaras(1938)
24. Gyimesi vadvirág (1938)
25. Tiszavirág (1938)
26. Vadrózsa (1938)
27. 13 kislány mosolyog az égre (1938)
28. Rozmaring (1938)
29. Süt a nap (1938)
30. A varieté csillagai (1938)
31. Jöjjön elsején! (1940)
32. Akit elkap az ár (1941)
33. Annamária (1942)
34. Mesék a bécsi erdőből (1943, rövid)
35. Afrikai vőlegény (1944)
36. Éji látogatás [filmterv] (1944)
37. Valahol Európában (1947)
38. Ének a búzamezőről (1947)
39. Könnyű múzsa (1947)
40. Mezei próféta (1947)
41. Beszterce ostroma (1948)

== Bibliography ==
- Nemeskürty István. A magyar film története. (1912 – 1963.) Bp. Gondolat Kiadó, 1965.
- Langer István. Fejezetek a filmgyár történetéből. I. kötet. 1917–1944. Kézirat. Bp. 1979.
- Nemeskürty István. A képpé varázsolt idő. A magyar film története és helye az egyetemes kultúrában, párhuzamos áttekintéssel a világ filmművészetére. Bp. Magvető Könyvkiadó, 1984
- Kulik, Karol. Alexander Korda: The Man Who Could Work Miracles. Virgin Books, 1990.
- Burns, Bryan. World Cinema: Hungary. Fairleigh Dickinson University Press, 1996.
- Cunningham, John. Hungarian Cinema: From Coffee House to Multiplex. London. Wallflower Press, 2004.
