= List of Hungarian films 1901–1947 =

This is a list collecting the most notable films produced in Hungary and in the Hungarian language during 1901–1947.

While the first years of the Hungarian cinema were in its infancy with mostly experimental films and short comedic sketches mostly conducted by enterprising hobbyists, by 1940 a large industry grew out of their footsteps, with famed film star idols and film studios. After World War II, a different kind of purpose found its way to movie making: full-length movies began to be used for political purposes.

For an alphabetical list of articles on Hungarian films see Category:Hungarian films.

== 1901–1929 ==
=== 1900s ===
Title	Director	Cast	Genre	Notes
1901
A táncz	Béla Zsitkovszky			The first Hungarian motion picture
1909
A pest riporter	Aladár Fodor			
A sakkjáték őrültje	Endre Nagy			
A szabadkai dráma	Béla Zsitkovszky			

=== 1910s ===
Title	Director	Cast	Genre	Notes
1912
Az Utolsó bohém	Mihály Kertész	Antal Nyáray, Elemér Thury, Béla Bodonyi, Zoltán Sipos		Curtiz's debut and first Hungarian feature film
A 2000 éves férfi	Aladár Fodor			
Ma és Holnap	Mihály Kertész	Gyula Abonyi, Ilona Ágh		
A gazdag ember kabátja	András Krupka			
Egy csók története	Sándor Góth			
A bűvös palack	Sándor Góth			
A víg özvegy	Sándor Góth			
1913
A csikós	Sándor Góth			
A dollárkirálynő leánya	Jenő Janovics			
Házasodik az uram	Mihály Kertész			
Ali rózsakertje	Oszkar Damó			
Sárga csikó	Félix Vanyl			
Rablélek	Mihály Kertész	Alfréd Deésy, Sári Fedák, Márton Rátkai, Elemér Thury		
1914
Az éjszaka rabjai	Mihály Kertész	Michael Curtiz		
Bánk Bán	Mihály Kertész	Mihály Fekete, Jenő Janovics, Mari Jászai, István Szentgyörgyi, Victor Varconi		
A hercegnő pongyolában	Mihály Kertész			
A kölcsönkért csecsemők	Mihály Kertész			
Őrház a Kárpátokban	Sándor Korda			
Pufi cipőt vesz	Kornél Tábori			
A szökött katona	Miklós M. Pásztory			
A tolonc	Mihály Kertész	Mari Jászai		
1915
Akit ketten szeretnek	Mihály Kertész			
Liliomfi	Jenő Janovics			
A kormányzó	Márton Garas			
Havasi Magdolna	Márton Garas			
Cox és Box	Márton Garas			
A tiszti kardbojt	Sándor Korda			
Tyutyu és Tyotyó	Sándor Korda			
Lyon Lea	Sándor Korda			
Hőseink diadalútja	Jenő Illés			
A Munkászubbony (The Work Jacket)	István Bródy			Presumed lost until 2017.
1916
A Karthausi	Mihály Kertész	Alfréd Deésy, Károly Lajthay		
White Nights	Sándor Korda	Lili Berky, György Kürthy	Drama	
The Laughing Saskia	Sándor Korda	Sari Körmendy, Dezső Kertész	Drama	
Miska the Magnate	Sándor Korda	Lili Berky, Victor Varconi	Comedy	
The One Million Pound Note	Sándor Korda	Lajos Ujváry, Gyula Nagy	Comedy	
Struggling Hearts	Sándor Korda	Lili Berky, Gyula Gál	Drama	
Ciklámen	Sándor Korda			
A szerencse fia	Márton Garas			
Hófehérke	Márton Garas			
Szulamit	Jenő Illés			
A világ csak hangulat	Jenő Illés			
Makkhetes	Mihály Kertész			
A magyar föld ereje	Mihály Kertész			
A szobalány	Adolf Mérei			
A fekete szivárvány	Mihály Kertész			
Doctor Ur	Mihály Kertész			
Az ezüst kecske	Mihály Kertész			
Farkas	Mihály Kertész			
1917
Álarcosbál	Alfréd Deésy	Béla Lugosi		
A béke útja	Mihály Kertész			
Harrison and Barrison	Sándor Korda	Márton Rátkai, Dezső Gyárfás	Comedy	
Magic	Sándor Korda	Victor Varoni, Antal Nyáray	Drama	
A Penny's History	Mihály Kertész			
The Red Samson	Mihály Kertész			
The Schoolmistress	Jenő Janovics	Lili Berky, Victor Varconi	Drama	
The Stork Caliph	Sándor Korda	Gyula Bartos, Oscar Beregi Sr.	Drama	
St. Peter's Umbrella	Sándor Korda	Károly Lajthay, Márton Rátkai	Drama	
A gólyakalifa	Sándor Korda			
A kis Gézengúz	Alfréd Deésy			
Az estélyi ruha	Alfréd Deésy			
A Tryton	Alfréd Deésy			
Küzdelem a múlttal	Márton Garas			
A vén bakancsos és a fia a Huszár	Mihály Fekete			
A vágy	Mihály Fekete			
Az anyaszív	Sándor Góth			
A vasgyáros	Jenő Janovics			
Az utolsó éjszaka	Jenő Janovics			
Az obsitos	Béla Balogh			
A Toprini nász	Béla Balogh			
A vengerkák	Béla Balogh			
A föld rabjai	László Békeffi			
Az Ezredes	Mihály Kertész	Cläre Lotto, Béla Lugosi, Charles Puffy		
A Kuruzsló	Mihály Kertész	Gyula Csortos, Ica von Lenkeffy, Tivadar Uray		
Leoni Leo	Alfréd Deésy	Béla Lugosi	Adventure	
Nászdal	Alfréd Deésy	Béla Lugosi, Károly Lajthay		Lugosi's debut film
A Régiséggyűjtő	Alfréd Deésy	Béla Lugosi		Short
A Senki fia	Mihály Kertész	Gyula Csortos, Ica von Lenkeffy, Károly Lajthay		
Tavasz a télben	Mihály Kertész	Ica von Lenkeffy, Charles Puffy		
Az Utolsó hajnal	Mihály Kertész	Jenő Balassa, Leopold Kramer		
Tatárjárás	Mihály Kertész			
Zoard mester	Mihály Kertész			
1918
Faun	Sándor Korda	Gábor Rajnay, Artúr Somlay	Drama	
Mary Ann	Sándor Korda	Ica von Lenkeffy, Tivadar Uray	Drama	
A víg Özvegy	Mihály Kertész	Mihaly Varkonyi, Berta Valero		
Az ördög	Mihály Kertész			
Karoly bakak	Zoltán Korda			
A napraforgós hölgy	Mihály Kertész			
Sergius Panin	Jenő Janovics			
Falusi Madonna	Jenő Janovics			
A szerelem haláltusája	Jenő Janovics			
A vörös kérdőjel	Béla Balogh			
Halálos csönd	Béla Balogh			
Rang és mód	Béla Balogh			
Jeruzsálem	Lajos Lázár			
Az Impresszárió	Lajos Lázár			
Selim Nono	Lajos Lázár			
A börzecézár	Lajos Lázár			
A 100.000 koronás ruha	Márton Garas			
A papagáj	Márton Garas			
Nőstényfarkas	Márton Garas			
A bánya titka I-II	Edmund Uher			
Szamárbőr	Edmund Uher			
Kettős álarc alatt	Cornelius Hintner			
Havasi szerelem	Cornelius Hintner			
Nebántsvirág	Cornelius Hintner			
A 99-es számú bérkocsi	Mihály Kertész	Cläre Lotto, Béla Lugosi	Crime	
Alraune	Mihály Kertész	Géza Erdélyi, Gyula Gál	Sci-Fi Horror	Lost film
Casanova	Alfréd Deésy	Béla Lugosi, Alfréd Deésy		
Az Élet királya	Alfréd Deésy	Béla Lugosi, Norbert Dán	Drama	
Küzdelem a létért	Alfréd Deésy	Béla Lugosi		
Lili	Cornelius Hintner	Béla Lugosi	Comedy	
Lulu	Michael Curtiz	Béla Lugosi		
A Napraforgós hölgy	Michael Curtiz	Lucy Doraine, Cläre Lotto, Iván Petrovich		
A Víg özvegy	Michael Curtiz	Mihály Várkonyi, Berta Valero, Endre Boross Árpád id. Latabár, Miklós Szomory, József Bánhidy	Musical	
1919
Jön az öcsém	Michael Curtiz	Oscar Beregi Sr., Lucy Doraine	Drama	Short
Liliom	Michael Curtiz	Gyula Csortos, Ica von Lenkeffy		Never completed
Tilos a csók	Béla Balogh			
Nantas	Béla Balogh			
A csempészkirály	Károly Lajthay			
Az Ősasszony	Károly Lajthay			
Twist Olivér	Márton Garas			
Jön az öcsém	Mihály Kertész			
Ave Caesar!	Alexander Korda	Oscar Beregi Sr., María Corda	Drama	
Neither at Home or Abroad	Alexander Korda	Lajos Ujváry, María Corda	Drama	
Number 111	Alexander Korda	Gábor Rajnay, María Corda	Thriller	
Yamata	Alexander Korda	Emil Fenyvessy, Ila Lóth	Drama	
White Rose	Alexander Korda	María Corda, Gyula Bartos	Drama	

=== 1920s ===
Title	Director	Cast	Genre	Notes
1920
Lord Arthur Savile's Crime	Pál Fejős	Ödön Bárdi, Lajos Gellért	Crime	
A tizenegyedik I-II.	Béla Balogh			
A halál után	Béla Balogh			
Az ötödik osztály	Béla Balogh			
A sárga árnyék	Márton Garas			
Sappho	Márton Garas			
A két árva	Jenő Janovics			
A szerelem mindent legyőz	László Márkus			
Az aranyszemű hölgy	László Márkus			
1921
Árnyék a sátoron	Béla Landesz			
A két árva	Jenő Janovics			
A tizenegyedik I-II	Béla Balogh			
A Loovódi árva	Béla Balogh			
Dracula's Death	Károly Lajthay	Paul Askonas	Horror	
Játék a sorssal	Béla Balogh			
Sappho	Márton Garas			
A sárga árnyék	Márton Garas			
A csodagyerek	Zoltán Korda			
Mackó Úr kalandjai	Alfréd Deésy			
A halál után	Alfréd Deésy			
Az ördög hegedűse	Lajos Lázár			
1922
Az egér	Lajos Gellért			
A megfagyott gyermek	Béla Balogh			
Nyomozom a detektívet	Béla Balogh			
Lavina, Galathea	Béla Balogh			
A gyerekasszony	Alfréd Deésy			
A Balaton leánya	Alfréd Deésy			
Tavaszi szerelem	Géza von Bolváry			
A keresztes vitézek	Márton Garas			
Hétszáz éves szerelem	Márton Garas			
Múlt és jövő	Artúr Lakner			
1923
Drakula halála	Károly Lajthay			
Egri csillagok	Paul Fejos			
A két és fél jómadár	Alfréd Deésy			
Triumphant Life	Béla Gaál	Paul Lukas	Drama	
Az elrabolt királyfi	Dezső Kertész			
Fehér galambok fekete városban	Béla Balogh			
A lélek órása	Béla Balogh			
1924
Aranymadár	Béla Balogh			
A Pál utcai fiúk	Béla Balogh			
A kutyamosó	Alfréd Deésy			
Hollandi szív	Alfréd Deésy			
Mr. Shenki	Alfréd Deésy			
1925
Az elhagyottak	Antal Forgács			
1926
A csodadoktor	Béla Gaál			
Péter Sebarstian	Alfréd Deésy			
Rongyosok	Béla Gaál	Gizi Bajor, Gyula Csortos, József Kürthy		
1927
The Seventh Veil	István Mihály	Ernő Verebes, Gusztáv Vándory	Silent	
Átok vára	János Vanicsek	Gyula Gál		
Juszt is megnősülök	István György			
Link és Fink	Béla Gaál			
Naftalin	Ernő Metzner			
1928
A Magyar Nemzeti Színház múltja, jelene és jövője	Unknown director			
1929
Prisoner Number Seven	Paul Sugar	Hans Adalbert Schlettow, Lissy Arna		
Élet, halál, szerelem	Lajos Lázár			
Száll a nóta	István György			
Tavasz a viharban	István György			
Csak egy kislány van a világon	Béla Gaál	Pál Jávor, Gusztáv Vándori, Márta Eggerth		The first Hungarian film to feature voice

== 1930s ==
=== 1930 ===
Title	Director	Cast	Genre	Notes
1930
Füst	István Nagy			
Kacagó asszony	Tibor Hegedűs			
Hány óra Zsuzsi	Gusztáv Mihály Kovács			

=== 1931 ===
Title	Director	Cast	Genre	Notes
The Blue Idol	Lajos Lázár	Pál Jávor, Oscar Beregi, Gyula Gózon	Comedy	
Hyppolit, the Butler	Steve Sekely	Gyula Kabos, Gyula Csortos, Pál Jávor, Gyula Gózon	Comedy	The first box-office hit of Hungary
Egy autó és semmi pénz		Gyula Kabos		
Budapesti hangos filmkabaré	Gusztáv Mihály Kovács			
Asszonyszelídítő	Béla Gaál			
A fekete autó	Alfréd Deésy			

=== 1932 ===
Title	Director	Cast	Genre	Notes
Ítél a Balaton (The Verdict of Lake Balaton)	Paul Fejos	Gyula Csortos, Antal Páger	Drama	
Kiss Me, Darling	Béla Gaál	Marika Rökk, Imre Ráday, Antal Páger	Comedy	
Repülő arany (Flying Gold)	Steve Sekely	Steven Geray, Gyula Kabos	Crime	
Tavaszi zápor (Spring Shower)	Paul Fejos	Annabella, Ilona Dajbukát, Steven Geray	Drama	
A Vén gazember (The Old Scoundrel)	Heinz Hille	Rosy Barsony, Tibor Halmay, Károly Sugár		

=== 1933 ===
Title	Director	Cast	Genre	Notes
The Ghost Train	Lajos Lázár	Jenő Törzs, Marika Rökk, Ella Gombaszögi	Thriller	
Miss Iza	Steve Sekely	Sári Fedák, Pál Jávor, Irén Ágay	Comedy	
The Rakoczi March	Steve Sekely	Pál Jávor, Margit Dajka, Gyula Csortos	Drama	Co-production with Germany
Romance in Budapest	Steve Sekely	Franciska Gaal, Paul Hörbiger, S.Z. Sakall	Comedy	
Stolen Wednesday	Viktor Gertler	Kálmán Rózsahegyi, S.Z. Sakall, Steven Geray	Comedy	
Vica the Canoeist	Béla Gaál	Erzsi Paál, Sándor Radó, Dezső Kertész	Comedy	

=== 1934 ===
Title	Director	Cast	Genre	Notes
Cornflower	Steve Sekely	Irén Ágay, Antal Páger, Lili Berky	Drama	
The Dream Car	Béla Gaál	Jenő Törzs, Zita Perczel, Gyula Kabos	Romantic comedy	
Everything for the Woman	Béla Gaál, Géza von Cziffra	Irén Ágay, S.Z. Sakall, Gyula Kabos	Comedy	
It Happened in March	Emil Martonffy	Ida Turay, Imre Ráday, Lili Berky	Comedy	
The New Relative	Béla Gaál	Zita Perczel, Gyula Gózon, Lili Berky	Comedy	
A Night in Venice	Géza von Cziffra	Gyula Csortos, Zsuzsa Simon, Ernő Verebes	Comedy	Co-production with Germany
Emmy	Steve Sekely	Pál Jávor, Gyula Kabos, Mici Erdélyi	Comedy	
Purple Lilacs	Steve Sekely	Irén Ágay, Gyula Kabos, Gyula Gózon	Comedy	
Romance of Ida	Steve Sekely	Irén Ágay, Pál Jávor, Gábor Rajnay	Drama	

=== 1935 ===
Title	Director	Cast	Genre	Notes
Address Unknown	Béla Gaál	Irén Ágay, Imre Ráday, Gyula Kabos	Comedy	
Budapest Pastry Shop	Béla Gaál	Zita Perczel, Artúr Somlay, Gyula Kabos	Comedy	
Dream Love	Heinz Hille	Ferenc Táray, Mária Sulyok, Giza Báthory	Drama	
The Empress and the Hussar	István György	Lili Berky, Gyula Gózon, Piri Vaszary	Historical	
The Homely Girl	Béla Gaál	Lili Muráti, Pál Jávor, Gyula Kabos	Comedy	
I Can't Live Without Music	Alfréd Deésy	Pál Jávor, Erzsi Somogyi, Gyula Gózon	Comedy	
Kind Stepmother	Béla Balogh	Maria von Tasnady, Antal Páger, Gerő Mály	Drama	
Little Mother	Henry Koster	Franciska Gaal, Friedrich Benfer	Comedy	Co-production with Austria
Miss President	Andrew Marton	Lili Muráti, Pál Jávor, Gyula Kabos	Comedy	
The New Landlord	Béla Gaál	Artúr Somlay, Pál Jávor, Mária Lázár	Drama	
St. Peter's Umbrella	Géza von Cziffra	Marica Gervai, Lajos Básti	Drama	
The Students of Igloi	István György	Pál Jávor, Gyula Kabos, György Dénes	Musical	
Thanks for Knocking Me Down	Emil Martonffy	Ida Turay, Pál Jávor, Gyula Kabos	Comedy	
The Wise Mother	Emil Martonffi	Antal Páger, Mici Erdélyi, Júlia Komár	Comedy	
Villa for Sale	Géza von Cziffra	Ernő Verebes, Rózsi Csikós, Lili Berky, Gyula Kabos	Comedy	

=== 1936 ===
Title	Director	Cast	Genre	Notes
Anniversary	Béla Gaál	Antal Páger, Imre Ráday, Gábor Rajnay	Comedy	
Be True Until Death	Steve Sekely	Klári Tolnay, Kálmán Rózsahegyi, Gyula Csortos	Drama	
Méltóságos kisasszony	Béla Balogh	Lajos Básti		
Cafe Moscow	Steve Sekely	Anna Tőkés, Gyula Csortos, Ferenc Kiss	War drama	
Cobweb	Mária Balázs	Ella Gombaszögi, Mici Erdélyi, Imre Ráday	Comedy	
Danube Rendezvous	Steve Sekely	Zita Perczel, Imre Ráday, Gyula Csortos	Comedy	
The Golden Man	Béla Gaál	Ferenc Kiss, Mária Mezei, Tivadar Uray	Drama	
Half-Rate Honeymoon	Steve Sekely	Irén Ágay, Pál Jávor, Gyula Kabos	Romance	
It Was Me	Arthur Bárdos	Elma Bulla, Jenő Törzs, Mici Erdélyi	Drama	
The Man Under the Bridge	Ladislao Vajda	Mária Lázár, Gyula Csortos, Ferenc Kiss	Drama	
Salary, 200 a Month	Béla Balogh	Pál Jávor, Antal Páger, Tivadar Uray	Comedy	
Sensation	Steve Sekely, Ladislao Vajda	Irén Ágay, Gyula Kabos, Zoltán Makláry	Comedy	
Son of the Pusta	Béla Pásztor	Gyula Csortos, Ferenc Kiss, Júlia Komár	Drama	
Sportszerelem	Zoltán Farkas, László Kardos	Kálmán Latabár, Edith Zeisler	Sports comedy	
Three Dragons	Ladislao Vajda	Mária Lázár, Lili Berky, Gábor Rajnay	Comedy	
Tomi	Béla Balogh	Gyula Csortos, Erzsi Simor, Ilona Dajbukát	Drama	
Where the Lark Sings	Carl Lamac	Mártha Eggerth, Alfred Neugebauer, Hans Söhnker	Musical	German language co-production

=== 1937 ===
Title	Director	Cast	Genre	Notes
120 Kilometres an Hour	László Kardos	Lili Muráti, Gyula Kabos, Mária Mezei	Comedy	
All Men Are Crazy	Viktor Gertler	Mária Lázár, Pál Jávor, Antal Páger	Comedy	
An Affair of Honour	Steve Sekely	Zita Perczel, Imre Ráday, Gyula Kabos	Comedy	
Beauty of the Pusta	Steve Sekely	Mária Lázár, Pál Jávor, Ferenc Kiss	Drama	
The Borrowed Castle	Ladislao Vajda	Piroska Vaszary, Ida Turay, Imre Ráday	Comedy	
Family Bonus	Jenő Csepreghy	Magda Kun, Steven Geray, Gerő Mály	Comedy	
A Girl Sets Out	Steve Sekely	Éva Szörényi, Antal Páger, Gyula Csortos	Comedy	
Help, I'm an Heiress	Steve Sekely	Irén Ágay, Tivadar Uray, Piroska Vaszary	Comedy	
Hotel Springtime	Béla Gaál	Antal Páger, Gyula Kabos, Ida Turay	Comedy	
I May See Her Once a Week	Sándor Szlatinay	Zita Perczel, Gyula Kabos, Piroska Vaszary	Comedy	
Lady Seeks a Room	Béla Balogh	Irène Zilahy, Ilona Kökény, Gyula Kabos	Comedy	
Mother	Johann von Vásáry	Sári Fedák, Jenő Törzs, Piri Vaszary	Comedy	
My Daughter Is Different	Ladislao Vajda	Klári Tolnay, Imre Ráday, Ida Turay	Comedy	
The Mysterious Stranger	Endre Somló	Tivadar Uray, Zoltán Várkonyi, Blanka Szombathelyi	Crime	
Pay Up, Madam!	Ákos Ráthonyi	Gyula Kabos, Lili Muráti, Pál Jávor	Comedy	
Sister Maria	Viktor Gertler	Éva Szörényi, Pál Jávor, Lili Berky	Drama	
Sweet Revenge	Johann von Vásáry	Mici Erdélyi, Antal Páger, Imre Ráday	Comedy	
Tales of Budapest	Béla Gaál	Ida Turay, Antal Páger, Manyi Kiss	Comedy	
There Are Exceptions	Ákos Ráthonyi	Imre Ráday, Klári Tolnay, Kálmán Rózsahegyi	Romance	
Tokay Rhapsody	Johann von Vásáry	Ági Donáth, Blanka Szombathelyi, Árpád Lehotay	Comedy	
Viki	Márton Keleti	Rosy Barsony, Pál Jávor, Gyula Kabos	Comedy	
Where Do We Sleep on Sunday?	Béla Pásztor	Ella Gombaszögi, Gyula Kabos, Kálmán Latabár	Comedy	
A harapós férj	Márton Keleti	Gábor Rajnay, Margit Dajka, Rózsi Bársony		

=== 1938 ===
Title	Director	Cast	Genre	Notes
Barbara in America	Márton Keleti	Margit Dajka, Gerő Mály, Gyula Gózon	Comedy	
Bence Uz	Jenő Csepreghy	Pál Jávor, Bella Bordy, László Szilassy	Comedy drama	
Billeting	Sándor Szlatinay	Antal Páger, Zita Szeleczky, Gyula Kabos	Musical	
Black Diamonds	Ladislao Vajda	Zita Szeleczky, Jenő Törzs, Gyula Csortos	Drama	Based on the novel of Mór Jókai
The Henpecked Husband	Johann von Vásáry	Gyula Kabos, Mici Erdélyi, Tivadar Bilicsi	Comedy	
Érik a búzakalász	Béla Gaál			
I Defended a Woman	Ákos Ráthonyi	Andor Ajtay, Antal Páger, Mária Lázár	Drama	
János vitéz	Béla Gaál			Based on the musical comedy of Pongrác Kacsóh
The Lady Is a Bit Cracked	Ákos Ráthonyi	Klári Tolnay, Imre Ráday, Gerő Mály	Comedy	
Man Sometimes Errs	Béla Gaál	Antal Páger, Anna Tőkés, Margit Dajka	Comedy	
Marika	Viktor Gertler	Pál Jávor, Zita Perczel, József Juhász	Comedy	
Number 111	Steve Sekely	Jenő Törzs, Pál Jávor	Thriller	
The Poor Rich	Jenő Csepreghy	Tivadar Uray, Zita Szeleczky, László Szilassy	Drama	
The Red Wallet	Béla Pásztor	Bella Bordy, Artúr Somlay, Ferenc Kiss	Drama	
Rézi Friday	Ladislao Vajda	Ida Turay, Mici Erdélyi, Antal Páger	Comedy	
Rosemary	Emil Martonffi	Ida Turay, Antal Páger, Gyula Kabos	Comedy	
Two Prisoners	Steve Sekely	Gizi Bajor, Pál Jávor, Irén Ágay	Drama	
The Village Rogue	Béla Pásztor	Margit Dajka, Artúr Somlay, Zsóka Ölvedy	Drama	
The Witch of Leányvár	Viktor Gertler	Éva Szörényi, Gyula Csortos, Piri Vaszary	Comedy	
The Wrong Man	Viktor Gertler	Margit Dajka, Ferenc Kiss, Gerő Mály	Drama	
Young Noszty and Mary Toth	Steve Sekely	Pál Jávor, Éva Szörényi, Erika von Thellmann	Comedy	Co-production with Germany
Azurexpress	Béla Balogh	Antal Páger, Klári Tolnay, Zita Szeleczky, Lajos Básti		
Varjú a toronyórán	Endre Rodríguez	Emmi Kosáry		

=== 1939 ===
Title	Director	Cast	Genre	Notes
The Ball Is On	Viktor Bánky	Zita Szeleczky, Erzsi Simor, Gyula Csortos	Comedy	
Deadly Spring	László Kalmár	Pál Jávor, Katalin Karády, Éva Szörényi	Drama	
The Five-Forty	Andre de Toth	Maria von Tasnady, Margit Makay, Ferenc Kiss	Mystery	
Flower of the Tisza	Géza von Bolváry	Klári Tolnay, József Juhász, Margit Symo	Drama	Co-production with Germany
Fűszer és csemege	Ákos Ráthonyi	Pál Jávor, Éva Szörényi, Artúr Somlay		
Hello, Peter!	Sándor Szlatinay	Antal Páger, Erzsi Simor, Sándor Pethes	Comedy	
Hungary's Revival	Jenő Csepreghy	Anna Tõkés, Manyi Kiss, Gyula Benkö	Drama	
Istvan Bors	Viktor Bánky	Antal Páger, József Bihari, Klári Tolnay	Comedy	
Janos the Valiant	Béla Gaál	Margit Dajka, Imre Palló, Ferenc Kiss	Musical	
The Minister's Friend	Viktor Bánky	Antal Páger, Júlia Komár, Béla Mihályffi	Comedy	
Money Is Coming	Béla Balogh	Rudolf Somogyvári, Tivadar Bilicsi, Géza Berczy	Comedy	
No Coincidence	László Kalmár	Ida Turay, László Szilassy, József Juhász	Comedy	
The Perfect Man	Sándor Szlatinay	Pál Jávor, Erzsi Simor, Sándor Pethes	Comedy	
Princess of the Puszta	Béla Csepreghy	Éva Szörényi, Sándor Szabó, Gyula Csortos	Romance	
The Sirens are Blasting	Jenő Csepreghy		War	
Six Weeks of Happiness	Andre de Toth	Klári Tolnay, Ferenc Kiss, Margit Ladomerszky	Comedy	
Stars of Variety	Josef von Báky	Pál Jávor, Zita Szeleczky, Erzsi Simor	Drama	Co-production with Germany
Two Girls on the Street	André de Toth	Maria von Tasnady, Bella Bordy, Piri Vaszary	Comedy drama	
Wedding in Toprin	Andre de Toth	Klári Tolnay, Pál Jávor, Ferenc Kiss	Spy drama	
Wild Rose	Béla Balogh	Margit Dajka, Árpád Lehotay, Erzsi Simor	Comedy	
Wildflowers of Gyimes	Ákos Ráthonyi	Klári Tolnay, Zsóka Ölvedy, Gerő Mály	Drama	

== 1940s ==
=== 1940 ===
Title	Director	Cast	Genre	Notes
The Bercsenyi Hussars	Sándor Szlatinay	Zita Szeleczky, Margit Makay, Gyula Csortos	Adventure	
Castle in Transylvania	Félix Podmaniczky	Maria von Tasnady, Antal Páger, Mária Mezei	Drama	
The Chequered Coat	Emil Martonffy	Kálmán Latabár, Manyi Kiss, Zoltán Makláry	Comedy	
Closed Court	Géza von Radványi	Maria von Tasnady, Antal Páger, Artúr Somlay	Drama	
Dankó Pista	László Kalmár	Pál Jávor, Margit Lukács, Erzsi Simor	Drama	
Duel for Nothing	Emil Martonffy	Gyula Csortos, Lili Berky, Artúr Somlay	Drama	
Egy csók és más semmi	Ákos Ráthonyi	Pál Jávor, Klári Tolnay		
Everybody Loves Someone Else	Béla Balogh	Tivadar Uray, Sári Déry, Zoltán Makláry	Drama	
Gábor Göre Returns	István György	Sándor Tompa, Sándor Pethes, László Misoga	Comedy	
Gül Baba	Kálmán Nádasdy	Sándor Kömíves, Pál Jávor, Zita Szeleczky	Musical	
Haunting Spirit	Lajos Zilahy	Katalin Karády, Antal Páger, Gyula Csortos	Drama	
Landslide	Arzén von Cserépy	Antal Páger, Olga Eszenyi, Marcsa Simon	Drama	
The Last of the Vereczkeys	Sándor Szlatinay	Zita Szeleczky, Miklós Hajmássy, Valéria Hidvéghy	Drama	
Matthew Arranges Things	Frigyes Bán	Gerő Mály, Margit Lukács, Lili Berky	Comedy	
Mirage by the Lake	László Kalmár	Pál Jávor, Klári Tolnay, Erzsi Simor	Drama	
Money Talks	Jenő Csepreghy	Margit Dajka, Éva Szörényi, Gyula Csortos	Comedy	
Much Ado About Emmi	Sándor Szlatinay	Zita Szeleczky, Pál Jávor, Gyula Csortos	Comedy	
On the Way Home	Arzén von Cserépy	Sári Fedák, Gyula Csortos, Ági Mészáros	Drama	
Queen Elizabeth	Félix Podmaniczky	Katalin Karády, Katalin Karády, Klári Tolnay, Pál Jávor	Historical	
A szerelem nem szégyen	Ákos Ráthonyi	Pál Jávor, Klári Tolnay		
Rózsafabot	Béla Balogh	Zita Szeleczky, József Timár, Kálmán Rózsahegyi	Drama	
Sarajevo	Ákos Ráthonyi	Maria von Tasnady, Ferenc Kiss	Drama	
Semmelweis	André De Toth	Tivadar Uray, Gyula Gózon, Erzsi Simor	Historical	
Seven Plum Trees	Félix Podmaniczky	Gyula Csortos, Ida Turay, László Szilassy	Comedy	
Unknown Opponent	Endre Rodríguez	Erzsi Simor, Andor Ajtay, Karola Zala	Thriller	
The Unquiet Night	Frigyes Bán	Klári Tolnay, Gábor Rajnay, Tivadar Bilicsi	Drama	
Yes or No?	Viktor Bánky	Lili Muráti, Pál Jávor, Antal Páger	Comedy	
You Are the Song	Endre Rodríguez	János Sárdy, Piroska Vaszary, Kamill Feleki	Drama	

=== 1941 ===
Title	Director	Cast	Genre	Notes
András	Viktor Bánky	Antal Páger, Bella Bordy, Valéria Hidvéghy	Drama	
A Bowl of Lentils	Zoltán Farkas	Katalin Karády, Pál Jávor, Gyula Csortos	Comedy	
The Devil Doesn't Sleep	Viktor Bánky	Klári Tolnay, Miklós Hajmássy, Gyula Csortos	Comedy	
Don't Ask Who I Was	Béla Balogh	Katalin Karády, Sándor Szabó, Mariska Vízváry	Drama	
Entry Forbidden	Emil Martonffi	Erzsi Simor, Kálmán Latabár, Gábor Rajnay	Comedy	
Europe Doesn't Answer	Géza von Radványi	Maria von Tasnady, Iván Petrovich, Ferenc Kiss	Drama	
Finally!	Zoltán Farkas	Lili Muráti, Antal Páger, Ida Turay	Comedy	
Flames	László Kalmár	Pál Jávor, Mária Mezei, Valéria Hidvéghy	Drama	
The Gyurkovics Boys	Dezső Ákos Hamza	László Szilassy, Ida Turay, Erzsi Simor	Comedy	
Háry János	Frigyes Bán	Antal Páger, Margit Dajka, Zoltán Makláry	Musical	
Left-Handed Angel	Ákos Ráthonyi	Clara Tabody, Pál Jávor, Gerő Mály	Drama	
Let's Love Each Other	Arzén von Cserépy	Elma Bulla, Gyula Csortos, Mici Erdélyi	Drama	
The Marriage Market	Félix Podmaniczky	Zita Szeleczky, János Sárdy, Manyi Kiss	Musical comedy	
Old Waltz	Viktor Bánky	Éva Szörényi, Antal Páger, László Szilassy	Comedy	
One Night in Transylvania	Frigyes Bán	Zita Szeleczky, Mária Lázár, Antal Páger	Comedy	
Prince Bob	László Kalmár	László Szilassy, Erzsi Simor, Gábor Rajnay	Musical	
Property for Sale	Viktor Bánky	Zita Szeleczky, Antal Páger, Hilda Gobbi	Comedy	
The Relative of His Excellency	Félix Podmaniczky	László Szilassy, Erzsi Simor, Artúr Somlay	Comedy	
Silenced Bells	László Kalmár	Margit Lukács, Ferenc Kiss, István Nagy	Drama	
Silent Monastery	Endre Rodríguez	Klári Tolnay, Margit Lukács, Pál Jávor	Drama	
Sister Beáta	István György	Éva Szörényi, Antal Páger, Piroska Vaszary	Drama	
Taken by the Flood	Endre Rodríguez	Nusi Somogyi, Valéria Hidvéghy, Erzsi Simor	Drama	
Three Bells	Félix Podmaniczky	Pál Jávor, Klári Tolnay, Ida Turay	Comedy	
Today, Yesterday and Tomorrow	Viktor Bánky	Pál Jávor, Artúr Somlay, Piroska Vaszary	Drama	
Yellow Rose	István György	Éva Szörényi, Zoltán Greguss, Gyula Szöreghy	Drama	

=== 1942 ===
Title	Director	Cast	Genre	Notes
At the Crossroads	Viktor Bánky	Klári Tolnay, Andor Ajtay, Vera Sennyei	Drama	
At the End of September	Kálmán Zsabka	Éva Szörényi, Margit Ladomerszky, Zoltán Makláry	Drama	
Beautiful Star	Imre Jelinek	Alice Fényes, Gerő Mály, Antal Páger	Drama	
Borrowed Husbands	Viktor Bánky	Erzsi Simor, László Szilassy, Piroska Vaszary	Comedy	
Cadet Love	Frigyes Bán	Valéria Hidvéghy, Margit Árpád, Gábor Rajnay	Comedy	
Changing the Guard	Viktor Bánky	Antal Páger, Gyula Csortos, Valerie Delacorte	Drama	Örségváltás
Costume Ball	Endre Rodríguez	Éva Szörényi, Ida Turay, Andor Ajtay	Crime	
The Dance of Death	László Kalmár	Artúr Somlay, Mária Lázár, Bea Goll	Drama	
Deadly Kiss	László Kalmár	Katalin Karády, István Nagy, Gábor Rajnay	Drama	
Dr. Kovács István	Viktor Bánky	Antal Páger, Erzsi Simor	Drama	
Isten rabjai	Ágoston Pacséry	Elma Bulla, László Szilassy		Based on the novel by Géza Gárdonyi
Egy bolond százat csinál	Emil Martonffy	Kálmán Latabár		
Guard House Number 5	Frigyes Bán	Elma Bulla, Pál Jávor, Miklós Hajmássy	Mystery	
A Heart Stops Beating	László Kalmár	Katalin Karády, Tivadar Uray, Árpád Lehotay	Drama	
I Am Guilty	Dezső Ákos Hamza	Mária Mezei, Gyula Csortos, Margit Árpád	Drama	
Kádár Versus Kerekes	Ákos Ráthonyi	Klári Tolnay, László Szilassy, Gerő Mály	Comedy	
Katyi	Ákos Ráthonyi	Klári Tolnay, Manyi Kiss, Gerő Mály	Comedy	
The Last Song	Frigyes Bán	Pál Jávor, Erzsi Simor, Kató Bárczy	Drama	
Lóránd Fráter	László Kalmár	Antal Páger, László Szilassy, Bea Goll	Comedy	
Magdolna	Kálmán Nádasdy	Mária Lázár, Ida Turay, Iván Petrovich	Drama	
Male Fidelity	József Daróczy	Antal Páger, Klári Tolnay, Elma Bulla	Drama	
A Message from the Volga Shore	Alfréd Deésy	János Sárdy, József Bihari, Ferenc Pethes	War drama	
Mountain Girl	Zoltán Farkas	Alice Fényes, István Nagy, Margit Ladomerszky	Drama	
Ópiumkeringő	Béla Balogh	Pál Jávor, Katalin Karády, Zoltán Greguss		
People of the Mountains	István Szőts	János Görbe, Alice Szellay	Drama	Emberek a havason
The Perfect Family	László Sipos	Lili Muráti, Miklós Hajmássy, Gyula Csortos	Comedy	
Sabotage	Emil Martonffi	Erzsi Simor, Valéria Hidvéghy, Ferenc Kiss	Thriller	
Sirius	Dezső Ákos Hamza	László Szilassy, Katalin Karády, Elemér Baló	Sci-fi	
The Talking Robe	Géza von Radványi	Pál Jávor, Maria von Tasnady, László Szilassy	Historical fantasy	
Temptation	Zoltán Farkas	Elma Bulla, István Nagy, Tibor Halmay	Crime drama	
Time of Trial	Endre Rodríguez	Katalin Karády, László Szilassy, Artúr Somlay	Co-production with Bulgaria	
Külvárosi őrszoba	Dezső Ákos Hamza	Katalin Karády, István Nagy, Rózsi Csikós, Imre Toronyi		
Heten, mint a gonoszok	Endre Rodríguez	Tivadar Bilicsi		
We'll Know By Midnight	László Cserépy	Erzsi Simor, Elma Bulla, Gyula Csortos	Drama	
A Woman Looks Back	Géza von Radványi	Maria von Tasnady, Pál Jávor, Artúr Somlay	Drama	

=== 1943 ===
Title	Director	Cast	Genre	Notes
Annamária	Dezső Ákos Hamza	Gábor Rajnay, Éva Szörényi, László Szilassy	Comedy	
Black Dawn	László Kalmár	István Nagy, Bea Goll, Margit Lukács	Drama	
Disillusion	Frigyes Bán	Katalin Karády, Mariska Vízváry, Miklós Hajmássy	Drama	
Dream Waltz	Félix Podmaniczky	Margit Zsilley, Mici Erdélyi, János Sárdy	Comedy	
Egy szoknya, egy nadrág	Dezső Ákos Hamza	Kálmán Latabár, Rózsi Csikós		
Happy Times	Endre Rodríguez	Katalin Karády, Andor Ajtay, Sándor Szabó	Drama	
I Dreamed of You	Johann von Vásáry	Lili Muráti, Tivadar Bilicsi, Ernö Mihályi	Romance	
It Begins with Marriage	Viktor Bánky	Lili Muráti, Miklós Hajmássy, Gábor Rajnay	Comedy	
The Marsh Flower	Dezső Ákos Hamza	Pál Jávor, Alice Fényes, Nusi Somogyi	Drama	
Mouse in the Palace	Emil Martonffy	Margit Makay, Gábor Rajnay, Gyula Benkő	Comedy	
The Night Girl	Frigyes Bán	Lili Muráti, Andor Ajtay, Vali Rácz	Drama	
The Night Serenade	Frigyes Bán	János Sárdy, Éva Kelemen, Margit Ladomerszky	Drama	
Rózsa Nemes	Emil Martonffy	Elma Bulla, Erzsi Simor, Tibor Halmay	Drama	
Orient Express	László Cserépy	Andor Ajtay, Irén Pelsőczy, Gyula Csortos	Drama	
Quite a Lad	Frigyes Bán	Miklós Hajmássy, Rózsi Csikós, Ferenc Pethes	Comedy	
Siamese Cat	László Kalmár	Zita Szeleczky, Miklós Hajmássy, Mici Erdélyi	Comedy	
The Song of Rákóczi	József Daróczy	Klári Tolnay, Károly Kovács, Samu Balázs	Historical	
Suburban Guard Post	Dezső Ákos Hamza	Katalin Karády, István Nagy, Rózsi Csikós	Drama	
Together	László Cserépy	Antal Páger, Erzsi Simor, Károly Kovács	Comedy	
The White Train	László Sipos	Erzsi Simor, Pál Jávor, Tivadar Bilicsi	Drama	
Kölcsönadott élet	Viktor Bánky	Lili Murát		
Kalotaszegi Madonna	Endre Rodríguez	János Sárdy		
Aranypáva	László Cserépy	Antal Páger, Alice Szellay		
Futóhomok	Alfréd Deésy			
Makrancos hölgy	Emil Martonffy	Pál Jávor, Katalin Karády		

=== 1944 ===
Title	Director	Cast	Genre	Notes
African Bride	István Balogh	Kálmán Latabár, Piroska Vaszary, Valéria Hidvéghy	Comedy	
Boy or Girl?	László Kalmár	Gábor Rajnay, Vera Szemere, Irén Pelsőczy	Comedy	
Devil Rider	Dezső Ákos Hamza	Gyula Benkő, Manyi Kiss, Mária Sulyok	Historical	
Eva Szovathy	Ágoston Pacséry	Katalin Karády, Pál Jávor, Artúr Somlay	Historical	
Half a Boy	Dezső Ákos Hamza	Lajos Rajczy, Margit Ladomerszky, Gyula Benkö	Comedy	
Hungarian Eagles	István László	László Perényi, Vera Szemere, Éva Serényi	War drama	
I'll Make You Happy	Viktor Bánky	Emmi Buttykay, Miklós Hajmássy, Piroska Vaszary	Comedy	
It Happened in Budapest	Dezső Ákos Hamza	Lili Muráti, Miklós Hajmássy, Margit Ladomerszky	Comedy	
Knock on the Window	László Sipos	László Szilassy, Éva Kelemen, Margit Ladomerszky	Drama	
A Lover of the Theatre	Emil Martonffy	Mária Egry, László Szilassy, Tibor Halmay	Drama	
Loving Hearts	Dezső Ákos Hamza, István Szöts	László Szilassy, Gyula Benkő, Bella Bordy	Romance	Anthology
Machita	Endre Rodríguez	Katalin Karády, Iván Petrovich, József Bihari	Spy drama	
Masterless Woman	László Sipos	Erzsi Simor, István Nagy, Ida Turay	Comedy	
Midnight Waltz	Sándor Zákonyi	Éva Kelemen, Ilona Kökény, Zoltán Makláry	Comedy	
Muki	Ákos Ráthonyi	Ida Turay, László Szilassy, Gyula Csortos	Comedy	
A Plane Has Not Returned	Ágoston Pacséry	Margit Lukács, Pál Jávor, Károly Kovács	War drama	
Something in the Water	Lajos Zilahy	Katalin Karády, Pál Jávor, Klára Pápai	Drama	
Strange Roads	Imre Apáthi	Klári Tolnay, László Szilassy, Mária Sulyok	Drama	
The Three Doves	Frigyes Bán	Ernö Mihályi, Éva Kelemen, Ilona Kökény	Comedy	
Wedding March	Zoltán Farkas	Zita Szeleczky, László Szilassy, György Kürthy	Drama	
Wildfire	Zoltán Farkas	László Szilassy, Vera Szemere, Gyula Csortos	Historical	
Gyanú	Zoltán Farkas	Arthúr Somlay, Szabó Eszter Szilágyi		

=== 1945 ===
Title	Director	Cast	Genre	Notes
After the Storm	József Daróczy	Tivadar Uray, Alice Fényes, Sándor Szabó	Drama	
The Schoolmistress	Márton Keleti	Éva Szörényi, Pál Jávor, Kálmán Rózsahegyi	Drama	Entered into the 1947 Cannes Film Festival

=== 1946 ===
Title	Director	Cast	Genre	Notes
Without Lies	Viktor Gertler	Kálmán Latabár, Lajos Básti, Ella Gombaszögi	Romance	

=== 1947 ===
Title	Director	Cast	Genre	Notes
Asszonysors	Mihály Szemes			
Fél pár gyűrött kesztyű	Alfréd Deésy			
Prophet of the Fields	Frigyes Bán	Eva Bartok, Árpád Lehotay, Gyula Benkö	Drama	
Somewhere in Europe	Géza von Radványi	Artúr Somlay, Miklós Gábor, Zsuzsa Bánki	Drama	
Song of the Cornfields	István Szőts	János Görbe, József Bihari, Marcsa Simon	Drama	
