= The Marriage Market (disambiguation) =

The Marriage Market is a 1911 operetta.

The Marriage Market may also refer to:

- The Marriage Market (1917 film)
- The Marriage Market (1923 film)
- The Marriage Market (1941 film)

== See also ==
- Marriage market
- The Babylonian Marriage Market
