= Oscar Beregi =

Oscar Beregi may refer to:

- Oscar Beregi (actor, born 1876) (1876–1965), Hungarian-American stage and silent film actor
- Oscar Beregi (actor, born 1918) (1918–1976), Hungarian-American film and TV actor, son of above
