= Ernő Gottesmann =

- Born: 19 December 1907; Arad; Austria-Hungary
- Died: 20 December 2004 (aged 97); Budapest; Hungary
- Occupations: Production manager Film producer
- Years active: 1938 - 1970

Ernő Gottesmann (19 December 1907 in Arad – 20 December 2004 in Budapest) was a Hungarian production manager and film producer.

== Biography ==
He was the son of Ernő Gottesmann and Paula Manoilovich. He attended high school in Budapest, and after graduation, he became a student at Budapest University of Technology and Economics, at the Faculty of Mechanical Engineering. After completing 4 semesters, he left the university, and started working at a German firm called Telefunken, later on he also worked at the Hungarian General Credit Bank, and at Sport Tours. From 1938 he worked at Magyar Filmiroda as a production manager. His most famous films were The Relative of His Excellency, along with Dr. Kovács István and The devil never sleeps (Az ördög nem alszik).

== Filmography (as a production manager) ==
- A kegyelmes úr rokona (1941)
- Az ördög nem alszik (1941)
- Three Bells (1941)
- Dr. Kovács István (1942)
- We'll Know By Midnight (1942)
- Szakítani nehéz dolog (1942)
- 5-ös számú őrház (1942)
- Kölcsönadott élet (1943)
- Quite a Lad (1943)
- Féltékenység (1943)
- Házassággal kezdődik (1943)
- Lejtőn (1944)
- A látszat csal (1944)
- Makkhetes (1944)

== Sources ==
- "Gottesmann Ernő". Petőfi Irodalmi Múzeum.
- Ernő Gottesmann at IMDb
- Magyar filmlexikon. edited by József Veress. Bp., Magyar Nemzeti Filmarchivum, 2005., 322. p.
- Castiglione Henrik, Székely Sándor, ed. (1941). Filmlexikon. Budapest: Merkantil Nyomda. pp. 211–212.
