= József Hajdú =

Hungarian actor

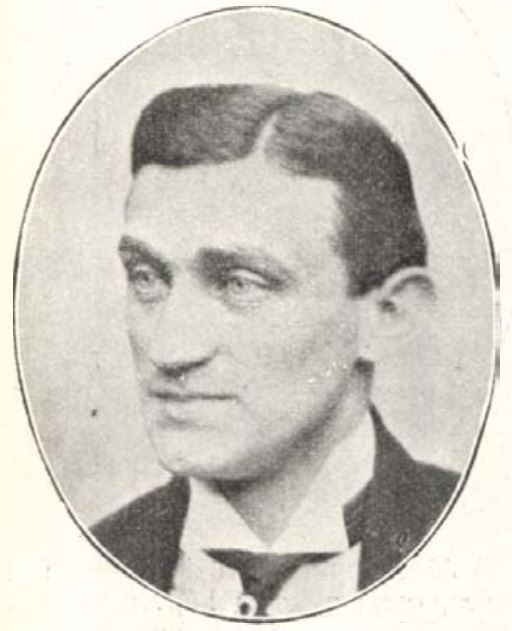
Photo of József Hajdú

József Hajdú (30 September 1884 – 24 June 1932) was a Hungarian actor. He was born in Debrecen and died in Budapest.

== Selected filmography ==
- St. Peter's Umbrella (1917)
- Faun (1918)
- A kis lord (1918)
- Oliver Twist (1919)
- Lady Violetta (1922)

== Bibliography ==
- Kulik, Karol. Alexander Korda: The Man Who Could Work Miracles. Virgin Books, 1990.
