= László Katonka =

Hungarian film editor

- Born: 1916 (age 109–110); Austro-Hungarian Empire
- Occupation: Film Editor
- Years active: 1939–1944 (film)

László Katonka (born 1916) was a Hungarian film editor. He worked prolifically between 1939 and 1944 on over forty films, editing some of the major productions of wartime Hungary, while working at the Hunnia Studios in Budapest. He collaborated with a number of directors including Károly Makk who described him as having "devilishly fast hands and an excellent sense of rhythm". Like many filmmaker his career came to an end around the time of the German invasion of Hungary which effectively halted production.

== Selected filmography ==
- Much Ado About Emmi (1940)
- Closed Court (1940)
- The Unquiet Night (1940)
- The Chequered Coat (1940)
- The Bercsenyi Hussars (1940)
- Matthew Arranges Things (1940)
- Seven Plum Trees (1940)
- Unknown Opponent (1940)
- You Are the Song (1940)
- Money Talks (1940)
- The Marriage Market (1941)
- Europe Doesn't Answer (1941)
- Taken by the Flood (1941)
- Property for Sale (1941)
- Three Bells (1941)
- The Devil Doesn't Sleep (1941)
- Entry Forbidden (1941)
- The Relative of His Excellency (1941)
- Háry János (1941)
- Dr. Kovács István (1942)
- A Message from the Volga Shore (1942)
- A Woman Looks Back (1942)
- The Dance of Death (1942)
- Guard House Number 5 (1942)
- Time of Trial (1942)
- Changing the Guard (1942)
- The Talking Robe (1942)
- It Begins with Marriage (1943)
- Hungarian Eagles (1944)
- Eva Szovathy (1944)
- I'll Make You Happy (1944)

== Bibliography ==
- Károly, Makk. Szeretni kell!: Egy élet kockái. Kossuth Kiadó, 2014.
