= Number 111 (1938 film) =

1938 film

- Directed by: Steve Sekely
- Written by: Jenő Heltai (novel); István Mihály
- Produced by: Richárd Horovitz
- Starring: Jenő Törzs; Pál Jávor; Mária Lázár; Marica Gervai
- Cinematography: István Eiben
- Edited by: József Szilas
- Music by: Dénes von Buday
- Production company: Mûvész Film
- Release date: 1 April 1938
- Running time: 80 minutes
- Country: Hungary
- Language: Hungarian

Number 111 (Hungarian: A 111-es) is a 1938 Hungarian thriller film directed by Steve Sekely and starring Jenő Törzs, Pál Jávor and Mária Lázár. It is a remake of the 1920 film Number 111, directed by Alexander Korda, which was itself an adaptation of a novel by Jenő Heltai.

== Plot ==
Olga, assistant of the hypnotist Joe Selfridge, is used by the latter to impersonate her own sister, Vera, herself a victim of Selfridge's cruelty. Selfridge's plan aims to obtain the fortune of the young Baron Vajk.

== Partial cast ==
- Jenő Törzs as Joe Selfridge
- Pál Jávor as Baron Sandor Vajk
- Mária Lázár as Vera Komarowska / Olga Komarowska
- Marica Gervai as Mabel Arnett
- Gyula Csortos as Sam Arnett
- Gábor Rajnay as Baranyai
- Andor Lendvay as Himself
- Zoltán Makláry as Selfridge's Aide
- Ferenc Hoykó as Hotel Alkalmazott
- Gyula Justh as Rendõrtiszt

== Reception ==
TV Guide described the film as "a lot like the sort of low-budget 'B' melodramas in which director Steve Szekely specialized when he moved to Hollywood in the 1940s."
