= Secret of St. Job Forest =

- Directed by: Mihály Kertész
- Starring: Imre Pethes; Jenő Törzs
- Release date: 1917
- Country: Hungary
- Language: Hungarian

Secret of St. Job Forest (Hungarian: A szentjóbi erdö titka) is a 1917 Hungarian film directed by Michael Curtiz.

== Cast ==
- Imre Pethes
- Jenő Törzs
