= The Last Song (1942 film) =

1942 film

- Directed by: Frigyes Bán
- Written by: Albert Vadady
- Produced by: Oszkár Madarász
- Starring: Pál Jávor; Erzsi Simor; Kató Bárczy
- Cinematography: Károly Vass
- Edited by: Lajos Paál
- Music by: Lajos Ákom
- Production company: Hunnia Filmstúdió
- Release date: 9 February 1942
- Running time: 74 minutes
- Country: Hungary
- Language: Hungarian

The Last Song (Hungarian: Az utolsó dal) is a 1942 Hungarian drama film directed by Frigyes Bán and starring Pál Jávor, Erzsi Simor and Kató Bárczy. It was shot at the Hunnia Studios in Budapest. The film's sets were designed by the art director János Pagonyi.

== Cast ==
- Pál Jávor as Fehér János, énekes
- Erzsi Simor as Erzsébet, zongorakisérõ
- Kató Bárczy as Mária
- János Sárdy as Péter, bányász
- Zoltán Makláry as Bokor - Fehér titkára
- Rezsö Harsányi as Mária édesapja
- István Lontay as Rendõrfogalmazó
- Nóra Ajtay as Erzsébet barátnõje
- Eta Szokolay as Mária nagynénje
- Ferenc Antók as Konferanszié
- Sándor Solymossy as Ügyelõ
- Gyula id. Szabó as Bányász
- Attila Egressy as Bányászlegény
- Erzsébet Nádudvary as Hölgy a bányászünnepségen

== Bibliography ==
- Balski, Grzegorz. Directory of Eastern European Film-makers and Films 1945-1991. Flicks Books, 1992.
- Juhász, István. Kincses magyar filmtár 1931-1944: az eredeti forgatókönyvből 1931 és 1944 között létrejött hazai mozgóképekről. Kráter, 2007.
- Rîpeanu, Bujor. (ed.) International Directory of Cinematographers, Set- and Costume Designers in Film: Hungary (from the beginnings to 1988). Saur, 1981.
