= Number 111 (1919 film) =

1920 film

- Directed by: Alexander Korda
- Screenplay by: László Vajda
- Based on: A 111-es 1919 novel by Jenő Heltai
- Produced by: Alexander Korda; M. Miklós Pásztory
- Starring: Gábor Rajnay; María Corda; Gyula Bartos; Lila Gacs
- Cinematography: István Eiben
- Production company: Corvin Film
- Release date: 1919
- Country: Hungary
- Languages: Silent; Hungarian intertitles

Number 111 (Hungarian: A 111-es) is a 1919 Hungarian silent thriller film directed by Alexander Korda and starring Gábor Rajnay, María Corda and Gyula Bartos. The film was based on a novel by Jenő Heltai. It was Korda's final Hungarian film before he went into exile in Austria during the White Terror. The film was remade in 1938.

== Cast ==
- Gábor Rajnay as Ivashiro
- María Corda as Olga / Vera
- Gyula Bartos as Sidney Balbrock
- Lila Gacs as Mabel
- Jenő Törzs as Baron Vásárhelyi
- Dezső Kertész as báró Vásárhelyi György
- Balassa Jenő
- Bäby Becker
- Sándor Dániel

== Bibliography ==
- Kulik, Karol (1975). Alexander Korda: The Man Who Could Work Miracles. Arlington House Publishers. pp. 27, 340. ISBN 0-87000-335-6 – via Archive.org.
