= Rudolf Icsey =

Hungarian cinematographer

- Born: 18 May 1905; Poprádfelka, Austria-Hungary
- Died: 13 July 1986 (aged 81); São Paulo, Brazil
- Other name: Icsey Rezsõ
- Occupation: Cinematographer
- Years active: 1936–1974 (film)

Rudolf Icsey (18 May 1905 – 13 July 1986) was a Hungarian cinematographer. After the Second World War he emigrated from Communist-dominated Hungary moving to Austria before he settled in Brazil, where he continued to work for several decades.

== Selected filmography ==
- Cafe Moscow (1936)
- Cobweb (1936)
- The Man Under the Bridge (1936)
- Sensation (1936)
- The Witch of Leányvár (1938)
- The Henpecked Husband (1938)
- The Perfect Man (1939)
- Istvan Bors (1939)
- Money Is Coming (1939)
- Hello, Peter! (1939)
- Princess of the Puszta (1939)
- Hungary's Revival (1939)
- Much Ado About Emmi (1940)
- The Bercsenyi Hussars (1940)
- You Are the Song (1940)
- Money Talks (1940)
- Duel for Nothing (1940)
- Matthew Arranges Things (1940)
- Seven Plum Trees (1940)
- Wedding March (1944)
- Closed Court (1940)
- Queen Elizabeth (1940)
- Castle in Transylvania (1940)
- The Unquiet Night (1940)
- The Last of the Vereczkeys (1940)
- Europe Doesn't Answer (1941)
- Old Waltz (1941)
- Property for Sale (1941)
- The Relative of His Excellency (1941)
- Sirius (1942)
- At the Crossroads (1942)
- Beautiful Star (1942)
- At the End of September (1942)
- Male Fidelity (1942)
- Sabotage (1942)
- Lóránd Fráter (1942)
- Annamária (1943)
- Dream Waltz (1943)
- Siamese Cat (1943)
- Happy Times (1943)
- Hungarian Eagles (1944)
- Boy or Girl? (1944)
- Midnight Waltz (1944)
- Machita (1944)
- Muki (1944)
- The Three Doves (1944)
- Wildfire (1944)
- Eva Szovathy (1944)
- Der Hofrat Geiger (1947)
- The Freckle (1948)
- Who Killed Anabela? (1956)
- Cara de Fogo (1958)
- Macumba Love (1960)
- Men and Women (1964)
