= Faun (film) =

1918 Hungarian film by Alexander Korda

- Directed by: Alexander Korda
- Written by: Edward Knoblock (play); Richárd Falk; László Vajda
- Produced by: Alexander Korda
- Starring: Gábor Rajnay; Dezsõ Gyárfás; Artúr Somlay; Ica von Lenkeffy
- Production company: Corvin Film
- Release date: 1918
- Country: Hungary
- Languages: Silent; Hungarian intertitles

Faun is a 1918 Hungarian silent drama film directed by Alexander Korda and starring Gábor Rajnay, Dezsõ Gyárfás and Artúr Somlay. It was based on a play by Edward Knoblock.

== Cast ==
- Gábor Rajnay - a Faun
- Dezsõ Gyárfás
- Artúr Somlay
- Ica von Lenkeffy
- Paula Horváth
- Erzsi Ághy
- János Ducret
- Jenõ Horváth
- Gyula Bartos
- József Hajdú

== Bibliography ==
- Kulik, Karol. Alexander Korda: The Man Who Could Work Miracles. Virgin Books, 1990.
