= The Black Rainbow =

- Directed by: Michael Curtiz
- Release date: 1916
- Country: Austria-Hungary
- Languages: Silent; Hungarian intertitles

The Black Rainbow (Hungarian: A fekete szivárvány) is a 1916 Austro-Hungarian film directed by Michael Curtiz.
