= Zoltán Makláry =

Hungarian actor (1896–1978)

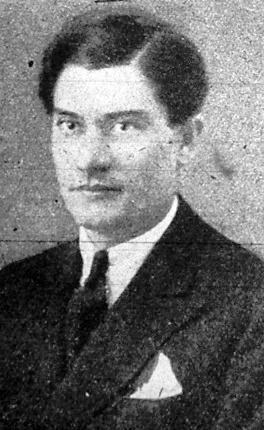
- Makláry in the 1920s
- Born: April 16, 1896; Budapest, Austria-Hungary
- Died: July 12, 1978 (aged 82); Budapest, Hungary
- Occupation: Actor

Zoltán Makláry (16 April 1896, Budapest – 12 July 1978, Budapest) was a Hungarian stage and film actor. Starting in 1923, Makláry went on to appear in around 150 films. He was the recipient of the Merit Artist of Hungary Award in 1951, the Kossuth Prize in 1954 and the Outstanding Artist of Hungary Award in 1955.

== Selected filmography ==
- Stars of Eger (1923)
- The Blue Idol (1931)
- Hyppolit, the Butler (1931)
- Spring Shower (1932)
- Flying Gold (1932)
- Stolen Wednesday (1933)
- The Ghost Train (1933)
- Emmy (1934)
- Romance of Ida (1934)
- The New Landlord (1935)
- Budapest Pastry Shop (1935)
- St. Peter's Umbrella (1935)
- Salary, 200 a Month (1936)
- Son of the Pusta (1936)
- Be True Until Death (1936)
- Sensation (1936)
- Viki (1937)
- All Men Are Crazy (1937)
- Tokay Rhapsody (1937)
- The Borrowed Castle (1937)
- My Daughter Is Different (1937)
- Man Sometimes Errs (1938)
- The Lady Is a Bit Cracked (1938)
- Two Prisoners (1938)
- Number 111 (1938)
- Young Noszty and Mary Toth (1938)
- Rosemary (1938)
- The Perfect Man (1939)
- Wedding in Toprin (1939)
- Wildflowers of Gyimes (1939)
- Princess of the Puszta (1939)
- Hungary's Revival (1939)
- Mirage by the Lake (1940)
- Cserebere (1940)
- Gül Baba (1940)
- Seven Plum Trees (1940)
- Everybody Loves Someone Else (1940)
- The Unquiet Night (1940)
- The Chequered Coat (1940)
- Queen Elizabeth (1940)
- Semmelweis (1940)
- Entry Forbidden (1941)
- The Gyurkovics Boys (1941)
- The Marriage Market (1941)
- Prince Bob (1941)
- Silent Monastery (1941)
- Today, Yesterday and Tomorrow (1941)
- A Bowl of Lentils (1941)
- Let's Love Each Other (1941)
- Left-Handed Angel (1941)
- Flames (1941)
- Three Bells (1941)
- Háry János (1941)
- People of the Mountains (1942)
- The Last Song (1942)
- A Heart Stops Beating (1942)
- Kádár Versus Kerekes (1942)
- Cadet Love (1942)
- Lóránd Fráter (1942)
- Sirius (1942)
- The Perfect Family (1942)
- At the End of September (1942)
- Changing the Guard (1942)
- The Dance of Death (1942)
- The Song of Rákóczi (1943)
- Quite a Lad (1943)
- Siamese Cat (1943)
- Dream Waltz (1943)
- Mouse in the Palace (1943)
- Hungarian Eagles (1944)
- Midnight Waltz (1944)
- Wildfire (1944)
- It Happened in Budapest (1944)
- Wedding March (1944)
- Devil Rider (1944)
- The Schoolmistress (1945)
- The Marriage of Katalin Kis (1950)
- Singing Makes Life Beautiful (1950)
- The Land Is Ours (1951)
- Baptism of Fire (1952)
- The Sea Has Risen (1953)
- The First Swallows (1953)
- Ward 9 (1955)
- Love Travels by Coach (1955)
- Professor Hannibal (1956)
- The Bridge of Life (1956)
- By Order of the Emperor (1957)
- The Football Star (1957)
- Édes Anna (1958)
- Pillar of Salt (1958)
- Danse Macabre (1958)
- Yesterday (1959)
- Crime at Dawn (1960)
- Be True Until Death (1960)
- Land of Angels (1962)
- The Golden Head (1964)
- Three Nights of Love (1967)
