= Three Bells (film) =

1941 film

- Directed by: Imre Apáthi; Félix Podmaniczky
- Written by: István Békeffy
- Produced by: József Golda; Ernö Gottesmann
- Starring: Pál Jávor; Klári Tolnay; Ida Turay
- Cinematography: Barnabás Hegyi
- Edited by: László Katonka
- Music by: Szabolcs Fényes
- Production company: Magyar Film Iroda
- Release date: 14 August 1941
- Running time: 94 minutes
- Country: Hungary
- Language: Hungarian

Three Bells (Hungarian: Három csengö) is a 1941 Hungarian comedy drama film directed by Imre Apáthi and Félix Podmaniczky and starring Pál Jávor, Klári Tolnay and Ida Turay. It was shot at the Hunnia Studios in Budapest and on location around the city. The film's sets were designed by the art director István Básthy.

== Synopsis ==
At an upmarket hotel in Budapest, one of the new guests Kowalsky is secretly a jewel thief who wants to start a new life with the proceeds of his latest robbery. He secures the attention of the maid Anna who is attracted by his luxurious lifestyle, despite being engaged to the hotel waiter Miklós.

== Cast ==
- Pál Jávor as Miklós
- Klári Tolnay as Anna
- Gerö Mály as Zsiga
- Ida Turay as Böske
- Zoltán Makláry as Kowalsky
- Imre Apáthi as Liftesfiú
- Vali Rácz as Énekesnö
- György Nagyajtay as Szobafõnök
- Ibolya Bilinszky as Nászutas
- Gyula Benkö as Nászutas
- Elemér Baló as Kálmán, elbocsátott pincér
- Mici Haraszti as Szállóvendég
- Gyula Szöreghy as Allamrendörségi nyomozó
- Gyula Turóczy as Szállodaigazgató
- Gusztáv Harasztos as Orvos
- Béla Mihályffi
- Lajos Sugár
- Ferenc Pethes
- Marcsa Simon
- Lajos Boray
- Gyula Kompóthy
- Lajos Köpeczi Boócz
- Miklós Pataki

== Bibliography ==
- Juhász, István. Kincses magyar filmtár 1931-1944: az eredeti forgatókönyvből 1931 és 1944 között létrejött hazai mozgóképekről. Kráter, 2007.
- Rîpeanu, Bujor. (ed.) International Directory of Cinematographers, Set- and Costume Designers in Film: Hungary (from the beginnings to 1988). Saur, 1981.
- Vilmos, Várkonyi. Jávor Pál: és a magyar film aranykora. Zima Szabolcs, 2013
