= Lajos Lázár =

Hungarian film director

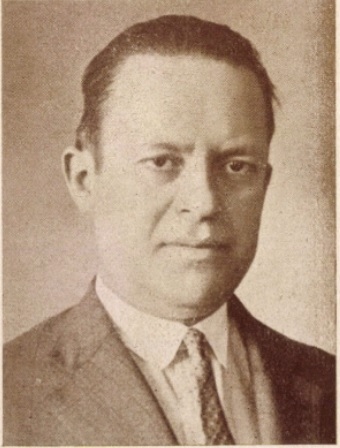
- Lázár in 1930.
- Born: 2 December 1885; Nagybánya, Austria-Hungary (now Baia Mare, Romania)
- Died: 2 June 1936 (aged 50); Budapest, Hungary
- Other name: Louis Lazar
- Occupations: Director, Producer
- Years active: 1918–1933 (film)
- Children: Gabor Lazar and Peter Lazar

Lajos Lázár (December 2, 1885 – June 2, 1936) was a Hungarian film director and producer active during the silent and early sound era. He was born in Nagybánya (now Baia Mare), then in Austria-Hungary and now in Romania.

== Selected filmography ==
- Drótostót (1918)
- Prisoner Number Seven (1929)
- The Blue Idol (1931)
- The Ghost Train (1933)

== Bibliography ==
- Bolton, Lucy & Wright Julie Lobalzo (ed.) Lasting Screen Stars: Images that Fade and Personas that Endure. Springer, 2016.
- Cunningham, John. Hungarian Cinema: From Coffee House to Multiplex. Wallflower Press, 2004.
