= Leányvásár =

Hungarian operetta by Victor Jacobi

Leányvásár (Girls' Market) is a Hungarian operetta composed by Victor Jacobi with a libretto by Miklós Bródy and Ferenc Martos. It was premiered on 14 November 1911 at the Király Színház (King Theater) in Budapest. It was adapted several times, as The Marriage Market in 1913 and as Szibill/Sybill/Sybil in 1914, all of which had several successful productions, and as Jack in Spanish.

The operetta has also been adapted to the screen multiple times. The first adaptation was a 1919 silent film, Leányvásár, directed by Antal Forgács (1881–1930), which used the libretto by Bródy and Martos as the basis for its story. A 1941 Hungarian-language sound film of the same name included the score by Jacobi. It starred Zita Szeleczky as Lucy Gergely, János Sárdy as Dr. Péter Haday, and Manyi Kiss as Biri, and was directed by Félix Podmaniczky. The operetta was adapted again into a 1985 Hungarian-language television film, also titled Leányvásár, which starred the actress Adél Kováts as Lucy Harryson with the singing voice of Lucy being dubbed by opera singer Magda Kalmár.

== The Marriage Market ==
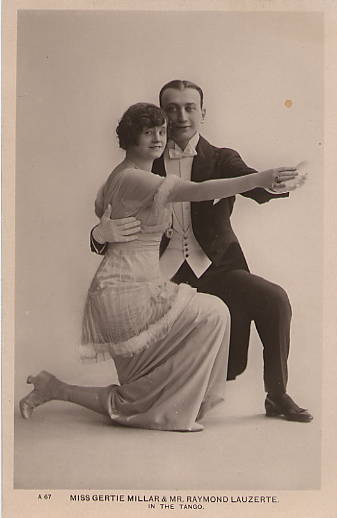
Gertie Millar and Raymond Lauzerte

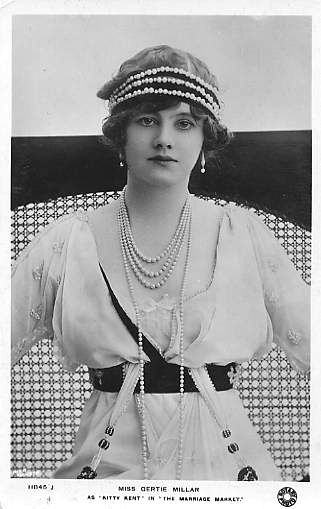
Millar as Kitty Kent

The Marriage Market is an English-language adaptation of Leányvásár, adaptated by Gladys Unger, with lyrics by Arthur Anderson and Adrian Ross. The Marriage Market was the operetta's first English-language production, in 1913, at Daly's Theatre in London, starring Gertie Millar as Kitty Kent, produced by George Edwardes and directed by Edward Royce, and at the Knickerbocker Theatre on Broadway, produced by Charles Frohman, again directed by Royce, with additional songs by Jerome Kern. The cast also included Robert Michaelis as Jack Fleetwood, E. A. Douglas as Senator Abe K. Gilroy, Tom Walls as Bald-Faced Sandy.

=== Musical numbers ===
Act 1

- Little Chiquita – Pablo and Chorus
- Compliments – Mariposa, Kitty and Jack
- Never Count Your Chickens Before They're Hatched – Emma and Blinker
- American Courtship – Kitty
- The One I Love – Mariposa and Jack
- Come On Boys for This Is Market Day – Chorus
- Hand in Hand – Mariposa, Jack, Kitty and Hurlingham

Act 2

- All the Ladies Love a Sailor Man – Captain
- Love of Mine – Mariposa and Jack
- The Middy – Kitty
- A 1 – Blinker
- On Their Honeymoon – Company
- June Is in the Air – Mariposa and Jack
- Answers – Kitty
- How Things Happen – Hurlingham and Blinker

Act 3

- It's Late Now – Blinker
- Jilolo – Kitty

Additional numbers

- I'm Not a Silly Billy – Kitty
- The Boy in Blue – Captain
- I Don't Believe in Fairies Now – Blinker
- The Heart of a Sailor – Captain and chorus
- Very Little Time for Loving Nowadays – Blinker and chorus
- Joy Bells – Blinker and chorus

== Szibill and Sybil ==
Szibill is an adaptation of Leányvásár by the original librettists. It was first performed on 27 February 1914, at the Király Színház (King's Theatre) in Budapest starring Sári Fedák in the title role; it rapidly made its way around Europe, playing in Vienna (1919) and most successfully in London (1919).

An English-language version by Harry Graham, with lyrics by Harry B. Smith, titled Sybil and containing additional numbers by Jacobi to lyrics by Smith, was first performed in Washington, D.C., and then, from 10 January 1916, at the Liberty Theatre in New York, with Julia Sanderson in the title role. Graham's version was later produced by the George Edwardes Company at the Prince's Theatre, Manchester, on 26 December 1920, and at Daly's Theatre in London on 19 February 1921, with José Collins as Sybil, running for 374 performances. It was also produced on Broadway by Frohman and in London by Seymour Hicks, starring Collins.

=== Synopsis ===
==== Act 1 ====
At the Grand Hotel Szibill (or "Sybil") Renaud is a young French singer recently arrived in Bomsk (Tomsk), a provincial, Russian town. She encounters the army Lieutenant Paul Petrov, a guards officer who fell in love with her in Saint Petersburg and who has now deserted his regiment, begging Szibill to run away with him back to Paris. When the town Governor arrives with a warrant to arrest Petrov, Szibill protests so strongly that the governor thinks she must be the Grand Duchess who is expected to arrive in the city that day with her husband the Grand Duke Constantine. Szibill goes along with the deception; and after a series of close shaves also involving her manager Poire and his young wife Margot (Charlotte in the Hungarian original), the Governor leaves with his troop of hussars, while Szibill leaves for a ball, still pretending to be the Grand Duchess. Finally the Grand Duke himself arrives. Puzzled to find that his "wife's" shawl (which in her hurry Szibill has left behind) is not one he recognises, he too leaves for the reception.

==== Act 2 ====
That evening, at the ball in the Governor's palace, the Grand Duke arrives but decides to play along with Szibill's deception that she is his wife, taking the opportunity to press for her favours. Szibill becomes very nervous and sends Petrov to find the real Grand Duchess (Anna) back at the hotel. When Anna sweeps into the ball, she is announced as Madame Sybill Renaud of the Opéra-Comique, Paris. Taken aback, The Grand Duke becomes jealous: he returns to the hotel with Szibill, leaving his wife to come back with Petrov.

==== Act 3 ====
At the Grand Hotel, the Grand Duke apologises to Szibill for his unwanted advances, while Anna's jealousy is calmed by Petrov. Poire and Margot (who had apparently been seduced by the Governor) sort out their differences too. Szibill succeeds in obtaining a pardon for Petrov's desertion, and all ends happily as the singer looks forward to an unclouded new life with her lover in Paris.

== Other adaptations ==
In 1916 a Spanish-language version was produced, in an adaptation by Emilio González del Castillo, at the Teatro de la Zarzuela in Madrid, under the title Jack. Jacobi's music was adapted by Pablo Luna.
