= The Blue Idol (film) =

1931 film

- Directed by: Lajos Lázár
- Written by: Adorján Bónyi; Dezsö Faragó; Imre Harmath; Miklós Lörincz
- Produced by: Miksa Schiffer
- Starring: Pál Jávor; Oscar Beregi; Gyula Gózon
- Cinematography: István Eiben
- Music by: László Angyal
- Production companies: Palatinus Filmterjesztõ Vállalat; Schiffer Film; Hunnia Filmgyár
- Release date: 25 September 1931
- Running time: 90 minutes
- Country: Hungary
- Language: Hungarian

The Blue Idol (Hungarian: A kék bálvány) is a 1931 Hungarian comedy film directed by Lajos Lázár and starring Pál Jávor, Oscar Beregi and Gyula Gózon. It was shot at the Hunnia Studios in Budapest. The film's sets were designed by the art director Márton Vincze.

== Synopsis ==
Following his bankruptcy Baron Lóránt György emigrates to the United States with his faithful valet Péter. Their initial attempts to find work, including as waiters, are unsuccessful before they encounter the millionaire Turner and his daughter Mary.

== Cast ==
- Pál Jávor as Lóránt György, baron
- Oscar Beregi Sr. as Turner, millionnaire
- Nelli Radó as Mary, Turner's daughter
- Gyula Gózon as Péter, Lóránt' valet
- Sándor Pethes as Jim, Mary's fiancé
- Gusztáv Vándory as hotel porter
- Lajos Gárdonyi as Heckmann, friend of Big Tom
- Zoltán Makláry as Wu, chinese man
- Pál Fekete as bar singer
- Sándor Peti as clerk
- Rozi Király as Bessy, secretary
- Mimi Princz as Bessy
- Andor Sárossy as Big Tom, sheriff
- Ferenc Vendrey as John, Mary' uncle
- Ica Bodó as lady in the restaurant
- Aladár Bársony as businessman
- István Dózsa as bar mixer
- István Lontay as businessman, Turner's employe
- Ibolya Orbán as lady in the bar
- Dezsõ Pártos as lottery ticket seller
- Ferenc Pázmán as uncle Béla, uncle of Lóránt György
- Ferencné Pázmán as lady in the bar
- Jenõ Szigeti as man on the phone
- Sári Végh as Mary's chambermaid
- Gyula Zilahi as guest in the hotel

== Bibliography ==
- Bolton, Lucy & Wright Julie Lobalzo (ed.) Lasting Screen Stars: Images that Fade and Personas that Endure. Springer, 2016.
- Juhász, István. Kincses magyar filmtár 1931-1944: az eredeti forgatókönyvből 1931 és 1944 között létrejött hazai mozgóképekről. Kráter, 2007.
- Rîpeanu, Bujor. (ed.) International Directory of Cinematographers, Set- and Costume Designers in Film: Hungary (from the beginnings to 1988). Saur, 1981.
