= Eva Szovathy =

1944 film

- Directed by: Ágoston Pacséry
- Written by: Miklós Bárd; Gyula Somogyváry
- Produced by: Sándor Szarka
- Starring: Katalin Karády; Pál Jávor; Artúr Somlay
- Cinematography: Rudolf Icsey
- Edited by: László Katonka
- Music by: Jenö Sándor
- Production company: Léna Film
- Distributed by: Bodrosi Ernõ Filmvállalata
- Release date: 1944
- Running time: 79 minutes
- Country: Hungary
- Language: Hungarian

Eva Szovathy (Hungarian: Szováthy Éva) is a 1944 Hungarian historical drama film directed by Ágoston Pacséry and starring Katalin Karády, Pál Jávor and Artúr Somlay. It was shot at the Hunnia Studios in Budapest. The film's sets were designed by the art director József Simoncsics.

== Cast ==
- Katalin Karády as Szováthy Éva
- Pál Jávor as Dóczy Lénárd
- Ági Mednyánszky as Girálthy Eszter
- Artúr Somlay as Szováthy Elek
- Árpád Lehotay as general Ungnád
- Blanka Raffay as Angela
- Imre Toronyi as Agárdy Ferkó
- Nándor Bihary as sergeant Beppo
- István Falussy as court ball guest
- Béla Tompa as bearded general
- Lajos Sugár as Girálthy Gábor
- József Barna as army doctor
- Gusztáv Vándory as lawyer

== Bibliography ==
- Juhász, István. Kincses magyar filmtár 1931-1944: az eredeti forgatókönyvből 1931 és 1944 között létrejött hazai mozgóképekről. Kráter, 2007.
- Rîpeanu, Bujor. (ed.) International Directory of Cinematographers, Set- and Costume Designers in Film: Hungary (from the beginnings to 1988). Saur, 1981.
- Taylor, Richard (ed.) The BFI companion to Eastern European and Russian cinema. British Film Institute, 2000.
