= Jön az öcsém =

1919 film

- Directed by: Michael Curtiz
- Written by: Antal Farkas; Iván Siklósi
- Starring: Oscar Beregi Sr. Lucy Doraine
- Release date: 3 April 1919
- Running time: 8 minutes
- Country: Hungary
- Language: Silent

Jön az öcsém (My Brother is Coming, literally "my younger brother is coming") is a 1919 short Hungarian drama film directed by Michael Curtiz. It is one of his few surviving early Hungarian works and was made during the short-lived Hungarian Soviet Republic (Tanácsköztársaság) under Béla Kun. It adapts a propaganda poem by Antal Farkas and serves as explicit communist/revolutionary agitation.

== Plot ==
The story centers on a working-class family—a mother (or wife), a young child, and the man of the house (the older brother)—anxiously waiting in their modest home for the return of the younger brother (“the öcs”), who has been away at war. Intercut with their tense wait are scenes from the front: intense, tinted battle sequences depict soldiers charging and falling in bloody combat. The younger brother is wounded, captured, and imprisoned. In his dark cell, the revolutionary slogan “Proletarians of the world, unite!” (Világ proletárjai, egyesüljetek!) appears as a glowing inscription, inspiring him. He escapes, preserves a red flag (or revolutionary banner), rallies new followers with fiery speeches, and raises a fresh army. He eventually returns home as a committed revolutionary. The family reunites joyfully—the two brothers embrace, and the child is overjoyed. The film ends with the reunited family watching a victorious revolutionary crowd marching in the street from their window, symbolizing hope and the triumph of the cause.

== Background ==
The narrative blends personal melodrama (the family’s longing) with explicit political messaging: war is portrayed as senseless slaughter of fellow proletarians, while revolution and solidarity bring redemption and victory. Intertitles from the original poem reinforce the propaganda. This was Curtiz’s last Hungarian film before he left for Austria (and eventually Hollywood). It was banned and copies seized after the regime’s fall, which ironically helped preserve it. The cast includes Oszkár Beregi Sr. as the younger brother, József Kürthy as the older brother, Lucy Doraine (Curtiz’s wife at the time, credited as Ilonka Kovács) as the woman, and a child actor as the kid. The film stands out for its dynamic visuals, use of tinting, and early propaganda style—quite different from Curtiz’s later Hollywood output.

Jön az öcsém has been described as one of the world's first agitprop films.

== Cast ==
- Oscar Beregi Sr. as The younger brother (as Oszkár Beregi)
- Lucy Doraine as The woman (as Ilonka Kovács)
- József Kürthy as The elder brother
- Ferenc Szécsi as The kid (as Ferkó Szécsi)

== See also ==
- Michael Curtiz filmography
