= Dream Waltz =

1943 film

- Directed by: Félix Podmaniczky
- Written by: Félix Podmaniczky; Márta Ungvári Nagy
- Produced by: Rezsõ Pozsgay-Schenkergel
- Starring: Margit Zsilley; Mici Erdélyi; János Sárdy
- Cinematography: Rudolf Icsey
- Edited by: Sándor Zákonyi
- Music by: Lajos Ákom
- Production company: Modern Film
- Release date: 11 February 1943
- Running time: 90 minutes
- Country: Hungary
- Language: Hungarian

Dream Waltz (Hungarian: Álomkeringö) is a 1943 Hungarian comedy film directed by Félix Podmaniczky and starring Margit Zsilley, Mici Erdélyi and János Sárdy. The film's sets were designed by the art director János Pagonyi.

== Synopsis ==
The star performer at the Hungarian National Opera inherits a huge country estate, on the condition that he gives up singing.

== Cast ==
- Margit Zsilley as Ágnes, Bruckner lánya
- Mici Erdélyi as Müller menyasszonya
- János Sárdy as Turi Gábor
- Gyula Csortos as Bruckner
- Kálmán Latabár as Doretti
- Zoltán Makláry as Sebestyén
- Ernö Mihályi as Paul Müller
- György Solthy as Igazgató
- Árpád Latabár Ügyelõ
- Ica Polgár as Felszolgáló
- Dóra Fáy Kiss as Szobalány
- Livia Kovács as Táncosnõ
- György Gonda as Gazdatiszt
- Gyula Szöreghy as Portás
- Oszkár Barinkay as Technikus
- Lucy Cziráky as Piroska, tehenészlány

== Bibliography ==
- Juhász, István. Kincses magyar filmtár 1931-1944: az eredeti forgatókönyvből 1931 és 1944 között létrejött hazai mozgóképekről. Kráter, 2007.
- Rîpeanu, Bujor. (ed.) International Directory of Cinematographers, Set- and Costume Designers in Film: Hungary (from the beginnings to 1988). Saur, 1981.
