= Jenő Törzs =

Hungarian actor

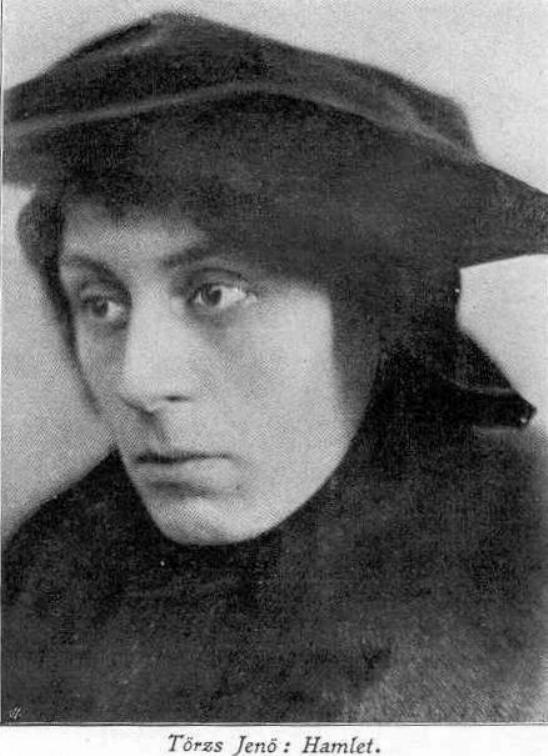
Jenő Törzs as Hamlet.

Jenő Törzs (23 April 1887 – 1 February 1946) was a Hungarian film and stage actor of Jewish heritage.

== Selected filmography ==
- Secret of St. Job Forest (1917)
- Alraune (1918)
- The Sunflower Woman (1918)
- Oliver Twist (1919)
- Number 111 (1919)
- Miss Iza (1933)
- The Ghost Train (1933)
- The Dream Car (1934)
- It Happened in March (1934)
- Miss President (1935)
- The Wise Mother (1935)
- It Was Me (1936)
- Mother (1937)
- Number 111 (1938)
- Black Diamonds (1938)

== Bibliography ==
- Kulik, Karol. Alexander Korda: The Man Who Could Work Miracles. Virgin Books, 1990.
