= Nobody's Son (film) =

- Directed by: Michael Curtiz
- Written by: Iván Siklósi; Ladislaus Vajda
- Produced by: Imre Roboz; Mór Ungerleider; Lajos Weitzenfeld
- Starring: Gyula Csortos; Ica von Lenkeffy; Károly Lajthay
- Cinematography: József Bécsi
- Release date: 22 October 1917
- Country: Hungary
- Language: Silent

Nobody's Son (Hungarian: A Senki fia) is a 1917 Hungarian film directed by Michael Curtiz.

== Plot summary ==
Baron Walden Henrik confides to his friend Alex that he loves Elíz, the daughter of the wealthy brush-manufacturing magnate Saxenhauser, but the millionaire father refuses the match because he wants an aristocratic son-in-law. To teach the millionaire a lesson the friends hatch a trick: Alex dons a fez, adorns his chest with fake decorations, and presents himself at the hotel as “Mirkó, an Albanian prince.” The brush-king hears of the arrival, invites the supposed prince to his country home, and is pleased to see his daughter and the “prince” growing close.

== Cast ==
- Gyula Csortos
- Dezso Gyarfas
- Hermin Haraszti
- Ica von Lenkeffy
- Károly Lajthay
- József Sziklay
