= The Princess in a Nightrobe =

Hungarian film

- Directed by: Michael Curtiz
- Written by: Ferenc Ráskai
- Produced by: Aladár Fodor; János Fröhlich
- Starring: Aranka Molnár; Lajos Ujváry; Kálmán Horváth
- Music by: Géza Chorin
- Release date: 6 May 1914
- Country: Hungary
- Language: Silent

The Princess in a Nightrobe (Hungarian: A Hercegnö Pongyolaban) [or The Princess in a Negligee] is a 1914 Hungarian film directed by Michael Curtiz.

== Plot ==
The owner of a private detective agency has to investigate the mysterious case of a bathrobe theft.

== Cast ==
- Aranka Molnár as the Princess
- Lajos Ujváry as German police officer
- Kálmán Horváth as Kálmán Horváth
- Vilma Gombócz
- Károly Árnyay
- Margit Koppány
- Dobozi
- Ferenc Ráskai

== Reception ==
"In the Apollo motion picture theatre, packed crowds have watched Ferenc Ráskai and Géza Chorin's magnificent cinematic sketch every evening, which proved to be a top-notch hit and was a success beyond expectations. The actors produce an excellent performance because Ráskai gave them imaginative roles and Géza Chorin's catchy music also contributes greatly to the success of the evening. [...]The audience celebrates the actors and at the center of the celebration is Lajos Ujváry, who brilliantly plays the role of the German policeman. Kálmán Horváth and Gombócz are also part of the great success. [...] Kertész's masterful direction is evident in it. The film featured Károly Árnyay, who proved to be a brilliant cinematographer in this first, small role. In the main role, which takes place in the film, Aranka Molnár again played the role of the princess with excellent art." (1914 review in Színházi Élet)
