= The Man Under the Bridge =

1936 film

- Directed by: Ladislao Vajda
- Written by: Ottó Indig; Márton Keleti; Ladislao Vajda; Géza von Cziffra
- Produced by: Ernő Gál
- Starring: Mária Lázár; Gyula Csortos; Ferenc Kiss
- Cinematography: Rudolf Icsey; Károly Kurzmayer
- Edited by: György Feld
- Music by: Sándor Komáromi
- Production companies: Magyar Film Iroda; Sonor Film
- Release date: 2 April 1936
- Running time: 73 minutes
- Country: Hungary
- Language: Hungarian

The Man Under the Bridge (Hungarian: Ember a híd alatt) is a 1936 Hungarian drama film directed by Ladislao Vajda and starring Mária Lázár, Gyula Csortos and Ferenc Kiss. The film's sets were designed by the art director József Pán.

== Cast ==
- Mária Lázár as Ágnes, Soltész felesége
- Gyula Csortos as Soltész professzor
- Ferenc Kiss as Smirgli
- Zoltán Szakáts as Visky András
- Margit Ladomerszky as Szakácsnõ
- Ilona Erdös as Soltész szobalánya
- Lajos Gárdonyi as Mandl
- István Berend as Detektív
- Gyula Szöreghy as Detektív
- Mária Andrássy as Hölgy az estélyen
- Lili Bojár as ápolónõ
- Árpád Fenyõ as Soltész inasa
- István Lontay as Alorvos a klinikán
- Ferenc Pataki as statiszta az Operában
- Ilona Vécsey as Fõnõvér

== Bibliography ==
- Frey, David. Jews, Nazis and the Cinema of Hungary: The Tragedy of Success, 1929-1944. Bloomsbury Publishing, 2017.
- Juhász, István. Kincses magyar filmtár 1931-1944: az eredeti forgatókönyvből 1931 és 1944 között létrejött hazai mozgóképekről. Kráter, 2007.
- Rîpeanu, Bujor. (ed.) International Directory of Cinematographers, Set- and Costume Designers in Film: Hungary (from the beginnings to 1988). Saur, 1981.
