= Gyula Csortos =

Hungarian actor (1883–1945)

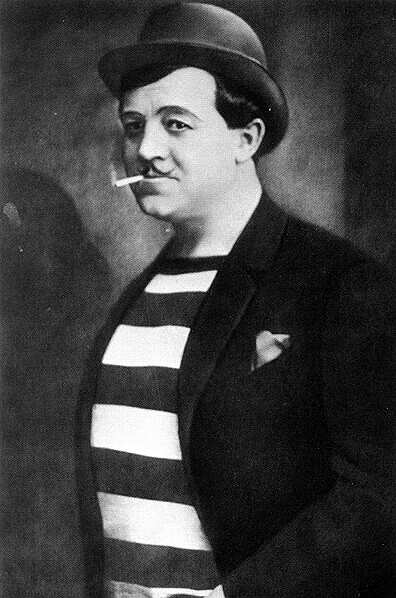
- Born: 3 March 1883; Munkács, Austria-Hungary (now Mukachevo, Ukraine)
- Died: 1 August 1945 (aged 62); Budapest, Hungary
- Occupation: Actor
- Years active: 1912–1944

Gyula József Csortos (3 March 1883 – 1 August 1945) was a Hungarian film and stage actor who appeared in 80 films between 1912 and 1944. He was born in Munkács and died in Budapest.

== Selected filmography ==
- The Red Samson (1917)
- Nobady's Son (1917)
- The Charlatan (1917)
- Liliom (1919)
- Rongyosok (1926)
- Hyppolit, the Butler (1931)
- Judgment of Lake Balaton (1933)
- The Rakoczi March (1933)
- A Night in Venice (1934)
- The New Landlord (1935)
- Cafe Moscow (1936)
- The Golden Man (1936)
- Son of the Pusta (1936)
- Be True Until Death (1936)
- It Was Me (1936)
- Tomi (1936)
- Danube Rendezvous (1936)
- The Man Under the Bridge (1936)
- Viki (1937)
- A Girl Sets Out (1937)
- Black Diamonds (1938)
- Number 111 (1938)
- Man Sometimes Errs (1938)
- Two Prisoners (1938)
- The Witch of Leányvár (1938)
- Hungary's Revival (1939)
- Princess of the Puszta (1939)
- The Ball Is On (1939)
- Janos the Valiant (1939)
- Duel for Nothing (1940)
- The Last of the Vereczkeys (1940)
- Haunting Spirit (1940)
- On the Way Home (1940)
- The Bercsenyi Hussars (1940)
- Seven Plum Trees (1940)
- Money Talks (1940)
- Much Ado About Emmi (1940)
- András (1941)
- A Bowl of Lentils (1941)
- The Devil Doesn't Sleep (1941)
- Let's Love Each Other (1941)
- The Relative of His Excellency (1941)
- The Talking Robe (1942)
- The Perfect Family (1942)
- Time of Trial (1942)
- We'll Know By Midnight (1942)
- I Am Guilty (1942)
- A Woman Looks Back (1942)
- Changing the Guard (1942)
- The Song of Rákóczi (1943)
- Suburban Guard Post (1943)
- Dream Waltz (1943)
- Muki (1944)
- Wildfire (1944)
