= The Charlatan (1917 film) =

1917 film

- Directed by: Michael Curtiz
- Written by: Imre Földes; Ladislaus Vajda
- Produced by: Mór Ungerleider
- Starring: Gyula Csortos; Ica von Lenkeffy; Tivadar Uray
- Cinematography: József Bécsi
- Release date: 10 September 1917
- Country: Hungary
- Language: Silent

The Charlatan (Hungarian: A Kuruzsló) is a 1917 Hungarian film directed by Michael Curtiz.

== Cast ==
- Gyula Csortos as Tordai Dezsõ medikus
- Margit T. Halmi as Horváth János anyja
- Ica von Lenkeffy as Ilma, Horváth János húga
- Tivadar Uray as Horváth János medikus
- László Z. Molnár as Zsámoly úr, a reporter
- Giza Báthory as Csáthyné
- Lajos Réthey
