= Sportszerelem =

1936 Hungarian sports comedy film

Sportszerelem is a 1936 Hungarian sports comedy film directed by Zoltán Farkas and László Kardos and starring Kálmán Latabár, Edith Zeisler and Géza Boross. The sports-mad owner of a toothpick factory only allows football players to work for him, and a number of jobs hang on the result of a big match. It was known as Love of Sport in English.

== Cast ==
- Kálmán Latabár ... Lajos, Szigethy fia
- Edith Zeisler ... Radován Mici
- Géza Boross ... Szigeti Alajos vezérigazgató
- Béla Salamon ... Sáray Márkus szabó
- Alice Rajna ... Radovánné
- Sándor Gál ... Kiss István tisztviselõ / Charles Wood színész
- Ferenc Delly ... Sáray György tisztviselotilde
- Ibolya Kondor ... Annie, Szigethy lánya
- Farkas Béla cigány prímas ettermben

== See also ==
- List of association football films
