= Tartar Invasion =

- Directed by: Michael Curtiz
- Release date: 1917
- Country: Hungary
- Language: Hungarian

Tartar Invasion (Hungarian: Tatárjárás) is a 1917 Hungarian drama film directed by Michael Curtiz.

== Cast ==
- Emmi Kosáry
- Béla Bátori
- Artúr Fodor
- Rezsö Inke
- Kálmán Somogyi
- Camilla von Hollay
- József R. Tóth
- Ernö Király
- Jenõ Medgyaszay
- Sándor Szõke
- LajosSzalkai
- Iván Cseh
