= Júlia Komár =

Hungarian actress (1912–1976)

- Born: 25 January 1912; Temesvár, Austro-Hungarian Empire
- Died: 26 November 1976 (aged 64); Buenos Aires, Argentina
- Occupation: Actress
- Years active: 1935–1939 (film)

Júlia Komár (25 January 1912 – 26 November 1976) was a Hungarian stage and film actress. She was married to the actor Antal Páger. Briefly a star of the cinema in the late 1930s, during the Horthy era, she left for Argentina in 1945 due to their association with the previous regime. She appeared at the Hungarian National Theatre in Buenos Aires for some years.

== Selected filmography ==
- The Wise Mother (1935)
- Son of the Pusta (1936)
- Anniversary (1936)
- Hotel Springtime (1937)
- Sweet Revenge (1937)
- Young Noszty and Mary Toth (1938)
- The Minister's Friend (1939)

== Bibliography ==
- Kékesi, Zoltán. Memory in Hungarian Fascism: A Cultural History. Taylor & Francis, 2023.
- Kurucz, Ladislao. Húngaros en la Argentina. Ediciones Biblioteca Nacional, 1999.
