= The Seventh Veil (1927 film) =

1927 film

- Directed by: István Mihály; János Vanicsek
- Written by: István Mihály
- Starring: Ernö Verebes; Gusztáv Vándory
- Cinematography: János Vanicsek
- Release date: 22 December 1927
- Country: Hungary
- Languages: Silent; Hungarian intertitles

The Seventh Veil (Hungarian: A hetedik fátyol) is a 1927 Hungarian silent film directed by István Mihály and János Vanicsek and featuring Ernö Verebes and Gusztáv Vándory. It was one of comparatively few Hungarian films made at the time as production had dramatically fallen in Budapest since 1920 before its revival following the introduction of sound. It is now considered a lost film.

== Cast ==
- Ferenc Delly
- Gaby Erkel
- Ernö Verebes
- Gusztáv Vándory

== Bibliography ==
- Cunningham, John. Hungarian Cinema: From Coffee House to Multiplex. Wallflower Press, 2004.
- Juhász, István. Kincses magyar filmtár 1931-1944: az eredeti forgatókönyvből 1931 és 1944 között létrejött hazai mozgóképekről. Kráter, 2007.
