= A Woman Looks Back =

1942 film

- Directed by: Géza von Radványi
- Written by: Géza von Radványi
- Produced by: István Szentpály
- Starring: Maria von Tasnady; Pál Jávor; Artúr Somlay
- Cinematography: Árpád Makay
- Edited by: László Katonka
- Music by: Szabolcs Fényes
- Release date: 1 December 1942
- Running time: 109 minutes
- Country: Hungary
- Language: Hungarian

A Woman Looks Back (Hungarian: Egy asszony visszanéz) is a 1942 Hungarian drama film directed by Géza von Radványi and starring Maria von Tasnady, Pál Jávor and Artúr Somlay. The film's sets were designed by the art director János Horváth.

== Cast ==
- Maria von Tasnady as Szánthóné, Székely Ágnes Színésznõ
- Pál Jávor as Miklós, színész
- Artúr Somlay as Szánthó Tamás, karmester
- Margit Zsilley as Szánthó Judit
- Gyula Csortos as Gereben Géza, filmíró Amerikában
- Pierre de Monfort as Francia fogadós, anyakönyvvezetcotilde
- Mária Keresztessy as Ilona, nevelõnõ
- Tibor Puskás as Gábor, Judit rajongója
- Lajos Köpeczi Boócz as Színigazgató
- Jenö Danis as Zeneakadémiai igazgató
- Rózsi Szerdahelyi as Pletykáló lány

== Bibliography ==
- Juhász, István. Kincses magyar filmtár 1931-1944: az eredeti forgatókönyvből 1931 és 1944 között létrejött hazai mozgóképekről. Kráter, 2007.
- Rîpeanu, Bujor. (ed.) International Directory of Cinematographers, Set- and Costume Designers in Film: Hungary (from the beginnings to 1988). Saur, 1981.
- Virginás, Andrea. Film Genres in Hungarian and Romanian Cinema: History, Theory, and Reception. Rowman & Littlefield, 2021.
