= Son of the Pusta =

1936 film

Son of the Puszta
- Directed by: Béla Pásztor
- Written by: Ferenc Csepreghy; Lajos Pásztor
- Produced by: István György
- Starring: Gyula Csortos; Ferenc Kiss; Júlia Komár
- Cinematography: Ferenc Gergelits
- Music by: László Angyal
- Production company: Bioscop Film
- Release date: 3 September 1936
- Running time: 81 minutes
- Country: Hungary
- Language: Hungarian

Son of the Puszta (Hungarian: Sárga csikó) is a 1936 Hungarian drama film directed by Béla Pásztor and starring Gyula Csortos, Ferenc Kiss and Júlia Komár. It was shot at the Hunnia Studios in Budapest. The film's sets were designed by the art director Márton Vincze.

== Cast ==
- Gyula Csortos as Bakaj András,módos gazda
- Ferenc Kiss as Csorba Márton
- Kálmán Rózsahegyi as Gelencséry, pusztabíró
- Marcsa Simon as Ágnes,Csorba felesége
- Júlia Komár as Erzsike,Bakaj lánya
- Zoltán Makláry as Bagó, a sánta koldus
- József Cselényi as Bogár Imre,a betyár
- Ferenc Pethes as Gelencséry fia
- István Dózsa as Révész
- Andor Heltai as Cigányprímás
- Domokos Sala as Cimbalmos
- János Balassa as Klarinétos
- Lajos Gárdonyi as Zinger Ficzek
- Matild Gyõry as Ficzek felesége
- László Keleti as Lebovits
- István Lontay as Földesúr
- Béla Tompa as Tiszttartó
- Lajos Bozzay as Bódi Dani
- Gyözö Kabók as Csárdás
- István Egri as Ferke

== Bibliography ==
- Juhász, István. Kincses magyar filmtár 1931-1944: az eredeti forgatókönyvből 1931 és 1944 között létrejött hazai mozgóképekről. Kráter, 2007.
- Rîpeanu, Bujor. (ed.) International Directory of Cinematographers, Set- and Costume Designers in Film: Hungary (from the beginnings to 1988). Saur, 1981.
