= Mr. Doctor (film) =

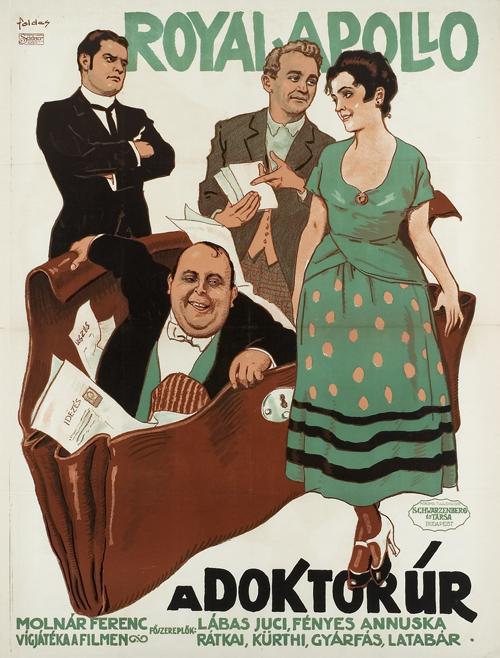
- Directed by: Michael Curtiz
- Written by: Sándor Incze
- Screenplay by: Sándor Incze
- Based on: A doktor úr 1902 play by Ferenc Molnár
- Starring: Márton Rátkai; György Kürthy; Lucie Labass; Gusztáv Vándory
- Distributed by: Kino-Riport
- Release date: 13 November 1916
- Running time: 62 minutes
- Country: Hungary
- Language: Silent

Mr. Doctor (Doktor úr) is a 1916 Hungarian silent drama film directed by Michael Curtiz. It is based on the 1902 play A doktor úr by Ferenc Molnár. It stars Márton Rátkai, György Kürthy, Lucie Labass, and Gusztáv Vándory. The film was released on 13 November 1916.

== Cast ==
- Márton Rátkai as Puzsér
- György Kürthy as lawyer Sárkány
- Juci Lábass as Mrs. Sárkány
- Annuska Fényes as Sárkány's sister
- Gyula Szőreghy
