= Prisoner Number Seven =

1929 film

- Directed by: Lajos Lázár; Paul Sugar
- Written by: Lajos Lázár; Walter Reisch
- Produced by: Géza Steinhardt
- Starring: Hans Adalbert Schlettow; Lissy Arna; Charlotte Susa
- Cinematography: József Bécsi; A.O. Weitzenberg
- Production companies: Mary-Film; Ziehm-Film
- Release date: 30 December 1929
- Countries: Germany; Hungary
- Languages: Silent; German intertitles

Prisoner Number Seven (German: Achtung! - Kriminalpolizei! or Gefangene Nr. 7, Hungarian: Rabmadár) is a 1929 German-Hungarian drama film directed by Lajos Lázár and Paul Sugar and starring Hans Adalbert Schlettow, Lissy Arna and Charlotte Susa.

== Cast ==
- Hans Adalbert Schlettow as Jenõ, szállodai pincér
- Lissy Arna as Rabnõ
- Charlotte Susa as Börtönorvosnõ
- El' Dura as Maláji táncosnõ
- Ida Turay as Madárka
- Mariska H. Balla as Szállodaigazgtónõ
- Olga Kerekgyarto as új szobalány
- Szidi Rákosi as Börtönõr

== Bibliography ==
- Prawer, S.S. Between Two Worlds: The Jewish Presence in German and Austrian Film, 1910-1933. Berghahn Books, 2005.
