= Tomi (film) =

1936 film

- Directed by: Béla Balogh
- Written by: Mária Szepes
- Produced by: István Erdélyi
- Starring: Gyula Csortos; Erzsi Simor; Ilona Dajbukát
- Cinematography: Lajos Berger Berend
- Edited by: György Feld
- Music by: Viktor Papir
- Production company: Kárpát Film
- Release date: 1936
- Running time: 86 minutes
- Country: Hungary
- Language: Hungarian

Tomi (Hungarian: Tomi, a megfagyott gyermek) is a 1936 Hungarian drama film directed by Béla Balogh and starring Gyula Csortos, Erzsi Simor and Ilona Dajbukát. It was shot at the Hunnia Studios in Budapest. The film's sets were designed by the art director József Pán.

== Cast ==
- Gizi Pécsi as Gáldy Tomi
- Anni Dobos as Özv.Gáldy Tamásné
- Klári Ádám as Sutyi, Tomi barátja
- Gyula Csortos as Gáldy Benedek
- Szeréna Sziklay as Flóra, Gáldy Benedek felesége
- Erzsi Simor as Gáldy Benedek lánya
- Lajos Básti as Kovács István mérnök
- Ilona Dajbukát as Karmazsinné
- Zsuzsi Polgár as Malvinka
- Ernö Mihályi as Galgóczy Gedeon
- Betty Hajnal as Cigány menyasszony
- Lajos Sugár as Inas
- Kató Timár as Sutyi anyja
- Béla Csóka as Cigány énekes
- Juliska Mihályffy asAgátha házvezetõnõ
- Dezsõ Pártos as Tisztelendõ
- Harry Csáktornyai as Gáldy Tamás, az elhunyt apa

== Bibliography ==
- Juhász, István. Kincses magyar filmtár 1931-1944: az eredeti forgatókönyvből 1931 és 1944 között létrejött hazai mozgóképekről. Kráter, 2007.
- Nemes, Károly. A magyar film útja. Uránusz Kiadó, 1999.
- Rîpeanu, Bujor. (ed.) International Directory of Cinematographers, Set- and Costume Designers in Film: Hungary (from the beginnings to 1988). Saur, 1981.
