= Castle in Transylvania =

1940 film

- Directed by: Félix Podmaniczky
- Written by: Géza von Radványi
- Based on: Castle in Transylvania by Sándor Hunyady
- Produced by: István Szentpály
- Starring: Maria von Tasnady; Antal Páger; Mária Mezei
- Cinematography: Ferenc Fekete; Rudolf Icsey
- Edited by: Lajos Paál
- Music by: Szabolcs Fényes
- Production companies: Atelier Film; Magyar Film Iroda
- Release date: 7 March 1940
- Running time: 76 minutes
- Country: Hungary
- Language: Hungarian

Castle in Transylvania (Hungarian: Erdélyi kastély) is a 1940 Hungarian drama film directed by Félix Podmaniczky and starring Maria von Tasnady, Antal Páger and Mária Mezei. It is based on a 1932 play of the same title by Sándor Hunyady. It was shot at the Hunnia Studios in Budapest. The film's sets were designed by the art director István Básthy.

== Cast ==
- Maria von Tasnady as count Monostory Ádám
- Antal Páger as count Monostory Ádám
- Zoltán Greguss as baron Eszéky György
- Valéria Hidvéghy as Evelin
- Mária Mezei as Hanna
- József Timár as Minister
- Gyula Gózon as Tóni
- Erzsi Könyves Tóth
- Ferenc Pethes as Jakab
- József Bihari
- Piroska Vaszary
- Marcsa Simon
- Sándor Hidassy
- Erika Kolossy
- Lajos Köpeczi Boócz
- György Ungváry

== Bibliography ==
- Juhász, István. Kincses magyar filmtár 1931-1944: az eredeti forgatókönyvből 1931 és 1944 között létrejött hazai mozgóképekről. Kráter, 2007.
- Rîpeanu, Bujor. (ed.) International Directory of Cinematographers, Set- and Costume Designers in Film: Hungary (from the beginnings to 1988). Saur, 1981.
