= Seven Plum Trees =

1940 film

- Directed by: Félix Podmaniczky
- Written by: István Békeffy; György Ujházy
- Produced by: Károly Rostaházy
- Starring: Gyula Csortos; Ida Turay; László Szilassy
- Cinematography: Rudolf Icsey
- Edited by: László Katonka
- Music by: Jenö Sándor
- Production company: Imago Film
- Release date: 5 December 1940
- Running time: 102 minutes
- Country: Hungary
- Language: Hungarian

Seven Plum Trees (Hungarian: Hétszilvafa) is a 1940 Hungarian comedy film directed by Félix Podmaniczky and starring Gyula Csortos, Ida Turay and László Szilassy. The sets were designed by art director István Básthy.

== Cast ==
- Gyula Csortos as id. Bereczky Tamás
- Ida Turay as Szabó Éva
- László Szilassy as ifj, Bereczky Tamás
- Piroska Vaszary as Sarolta
- Gerö Mály as Szabó Péter, gyáros
- Manyi Kiss as Etelka, Stefanics lánya
- Tivadar Bilicsi as Stefanics
- Zoltán Makláry as Szolga
- Lili Berky as Emma
- József Juhász as Banki jogtanácsos
- Ilona Kiszely as Zsófi
- Erzsi Bata as Zsófi
- Gyula Köváry as Alkalmazott
- Andor Sárossy as Varga, vendég
- Béla Fáy as Bankügynök
- Gyözö Kabók as Pincér
- György Gonda as Paraszt
- Lajos Kelemen as Fazekas, ügyvéd
- Ottó Jeney as Szállodaszolga
- Lajos Sugár as Portás
- József Berky as Cigányprímás
- Zsuzsa Lengváry as Titkárnõ
- Sándor Solymossy as Vendég a szállodában

== Bibliography ==
- Juhász, István. Kincses magyar filmtár 1931-1944: az eredeti forgatókönyvből 1931 és 1944 között létrejött hazai mozgóképekről. Kráter, 2007.
- Rîpeanu, Bujor. (ed.) International Directory of Cinematographers, Set- and Costume Designers in Film: Hungary (from the beginnings to 1988). Saur, 1981.
