= The Ghost Train (1933 film) =

1933 film

- Directed by: Lajos Lázár
- Written by: Lajos Bíró; László Békeffi
- Based on: The Ghost Train by Arnold Ridley
- Produced by: Sándor Winter
- Starring: Jenö Törzs; Marika Rökk; Ella Gombaszögi
- Cinematography: István Eiben
- Edited by: György Feld
- Music by: Mihály Eisemann; Dezsõ Szenkár
- Production company: City Film
- Release date: 15 April 1933
- Running time: 65 minutes
- Country: Hungary
- Language: Hungarian

The Ghost Train (Hungarian: Kísértetek vonata, Romanian: Trenul Fantoma,) is a 1933 Hungarian and Romanian thriller film produced in both the Hungarian and Romanian languages. It was directed by Lajos Lázár and Jean Mihail and starring Jenö Törzs, Marika Rökk and Ella Gombaszögi (Hungarian language version), and Tony Bulandra, Gheorghe Storin and Lisette Verea (Romanian language version). It is an adaptation of Arnold Ridley's 1923 play The Ghost Train by László Békeffi, Victor Eftimiu and Lajos Biró. It was shot at the Hunnia Studios in Budapest. The film's sets were designed by the art director István Szirontai Lhotka.

== Synopsis ==
A group of passengers are stranded in an English country station the very night that a famed ghostly express train is due to appear.

== Cast ==
- Jenö Törzs / Tony Bulandra as Teddy Deakin
- Marika Rökk / Lisette Verea as Mary
- Ella Gombaszögi / Renée-Annie as Mrs. Burns
- Oscar Beregi Sr. / Gheorghe Storin as Dr. Stirling
- Lajos Ihász / Stroe Atanasiu as Robert
- Zoltán Makláry / Gheorghe Pǎunescu as Black
- Margit Ladomerszky / Dida Solomon-Calimachi as Julia
- Sándor Pethes as Nászutas
- Ica Bodó as Nászutas
- Gábor Kertész / Marcel Enescu as Price
- Ferenc Turay as Sofõr
- Elemér Baló as Rádióstiszt
- Jenö Herczeg as Elsõ utas
- Gyula Justh as Kalauz
- Vilmos Komlós as Második utas
- Rózsi Miklós as Lány a vonaton

== Bibliography ==
- Cunningham, John. Hungarian Cinema: From Coffee House to Multiplex. Wallflower Press, 2004.
- Juhász, István. Kincses magyar filmtár 1931-1944: az eredeti forgatókönyvből 1931 és 1944 között létrejött hazai mozgóképekről. Kráter, 2007.
- Rîpeanu, Bujor. (ed.) International Directory of Cinematographers, Set- and Costume Designers in Film: Hungary (from the beginnings to 1988). Saur, 1981.
