= Kálmán Latabár =

Hungarian comedian and film actor

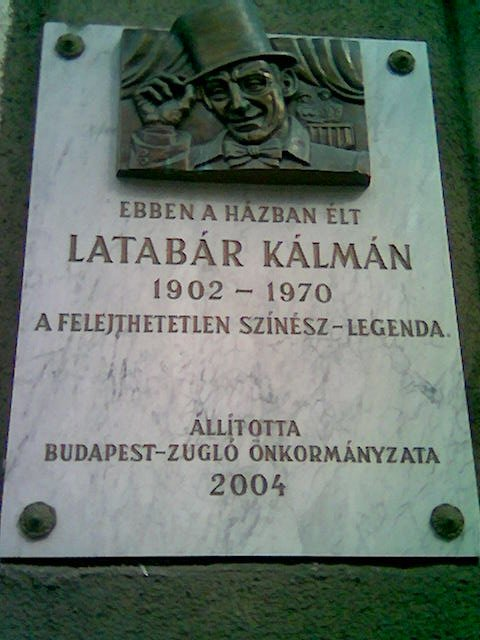
- Born: 24 November 1902; Kecskemét, Austria-Hungary
- Died: 12 January 1970 (aged 67); Budapest, Hungary
- Occupations: Film actor; comedian
- Years active: 1935–1968
- Spouse: Katalin Walter
- Children: Kálmán Latabár Jr., Katalin Latabár

Kálmán Latabár (1902–1970) was a Hungarian comedian and film actor, perhaps the country's most popular comic in the post-war years. "Latyi" reached his peak popularity during the war years and in the early days of Hungarian television, doing stand-up comedy, operettas and musicals, and comic routines in variety shows. A talented song-and-dance man, he had impeccable comic timing. Later in life he made several successful tours in Western Europe, Israel and America, idolized by the émigré Hungarian community. He was also a regular on the numerous theater stages of Budapest and of the provincial cities of the country. He was a recipient of the Kossuth Prize.

== Selected filmography ==
- Sportszerelem (Sports Love) (1936)
- Pay Up, Madam! (1937)
- Where Do We Sleep on Sunday? (1937)
- Money Is Coming (1939)
- The Chequered Coat (1940)
- Cserebere (Swapping) (1940)
- Entry Forbidden (1941)
- The Marriage Market (1941)
- Dream Waltz (1943)
- African Bride (1944)
- Muki (1944)
- Without Lies (1946)
- Mickey Magnate (1949)
- Zold, sárga, piros (Green, Yellow, Red) (1948)
- Janika (1949)
- Singing Makes Life Beautiful (1950)
- A Képzett beteg (The Imaginary Invalid) (1952)
- Try and Win (1952)
- The State Department Store (1953)
- Keep Your Chin Up (1954)
- What a Night! (1958)
- Irány Mexikó! (Direction Mexico) (1968)
