= Queen Elizabeth (1940 film) =

1940 film

- Italian poster
- Directed by: Félix Podmaniczky
- Written by: Károly Nóti; László Szilágyi
- Produced by: Károly Rostaházy
- Starring: Katalin Karády; Klári Tolnay; Pál Jávor
- Cinematography: Rudolf Icsey
- Edited by: Zoltán Farkas
- Music by: Jenö Huszka
- Production company: Harmónia Film
- Release date: 5 September 1940
- Running time: 98 minutes
- Country: Hungary
- Language: Hungarian

Queen Elizabeth (Hungarian: Erzsébet királyné) is a 1940 Hungarian historical drama film directed by Félix Podmaniczky and starring Katalin Karády, Klári Tolnay and Pál Jávor. It was shot at the Hunnia Studios in Budapest. The film's sets were designed by the art directors Klára B. Kokas and Márton Vincze.

== Synopsis ==
Elisabeth the young wife of Franz Joseph is titular Queen of Hungary, and is popular in the country which has a lesser status within the Austrian Emperor. Following the failure of the Hungarian Revolution of 1848, Hungarian patriots approach her to seek her support in gaining equality and independence within the Empire.

== Cast ==
- Katalin Karády as Erzsébet királyné
- Klári Tolnay as Latkóczy Ida
- Pál Jávor as Báró Neszmély Kálmán
- Artúr Somlay as Latkóczy Gábor
- Gábor Rajnay as Gróf Axamenti tábornok
- Gyula Gózon as Galambos bácsi
- Tivadar Bilicsi as Johann
- Éva Fenyvessy as Mici, színésznõ
- Zoltán Makláry as Kropacsek
- Ilka Petur as Erzsébet udvarhölgye
- Béla Fáy as Udvari lakáj
- Gusztáv Vándory as Magyar úr
- Sári Sugár as cselédlány Latkócznál
- József Szabó as Magyar úr
- Karola Zala as Arisztokrata hölgy
- Domokos Sala as Magyar úr
- Lajos Sugár as Osztrák tiszt
- Tibor Rubinyi as Osztrák rendõrfõnök
- Gyula Zordon as Klapka György tábornok
- János Balázs as Cseléd
- Lajos Kozma as Osztrák rendõr
- Gabika Bán as Fõhercegnõ
- Ferenc Antók as Osztrák tiszt
- Jenõ Balázs as Osztrák rendõr
- György Gonda as Betyár
- Menyhért Gulyás as gróf Barkóczy János
- Károly Hajagos as Rakovszky Zsigmond
- Gizi Hernády as Gréta, szobalány a panzióban
- Erzsi Hont as Erzsébet udvarhölgye
- József Juhász as Betyár
- Tihamér Lázár as Szalay Dénes
- Sándor Naszódy as Fiatal csendõr
- Erzsi Orsolya as Huberné
- Zoltán Pethö as összeesküvõ
- Dezsõ Pártos as Osztrák úr
- Vilma Révész as cseléd Latkóczynál
- Margit Selmeczy as Klotild, Erzsébet udvarhölgye
- István Szegedi Szabó as Osztrák tiszt
- Imre Toronyi as Deák Ferenc
- György Ungváry as Rudolf fõherceg

== Bibliography ==
- Frey, David. Jews, Nazis and the Cinema of Hungary: The Tragedy of Success, 1929-1944. Bloomsbury Publishing, 2017.
- Juhász, István. Kincses magyar filmtár 1931-1944: az eredeti forgatókönyvből 1931 és 1944 között létrejött hazai mozgóképekről. Kráter, 2007.
- Rîpeanu, Bujor. (ed.) International Directory of Cinematographers, Set- and Costume Designers in Film: Hungary (from the beginnings to 1988). Saur, 1981.
- Taylor, Richard (ed.) The BFI companion to Eastern European and Russian cinema. British Film Institute, 2000.
