= Gyula Bartos =

Hungarian actor (1872–1954)

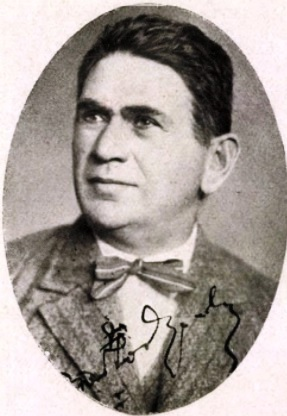
In 1929, Bartos Gyula Actor

Gyula Bartos (born Samuel Prinz; 7 April 1872 – 21 May 1954) was a Hungarian stage and film actor. He performed for many years at the National Theatre in Budapest.

Bartos was born in Szeged and died in Budapest.

== Selected filmography ==
- St. Peter's Umbrella (1917)
- The Stork Caliph (1917)
- Faun (1918)
- White Rose (1919)
- Number 111 (1919)
- Man of Gold (1919)
- Black Dawn (1943)
- Déryné (1951)

== Bibliography ==
- Kulik, Karol. Alexander Korda: The Man Who Could Work Miracles. Virgin Books, 1990.
