= Pál Jávor =

Hungarian actor

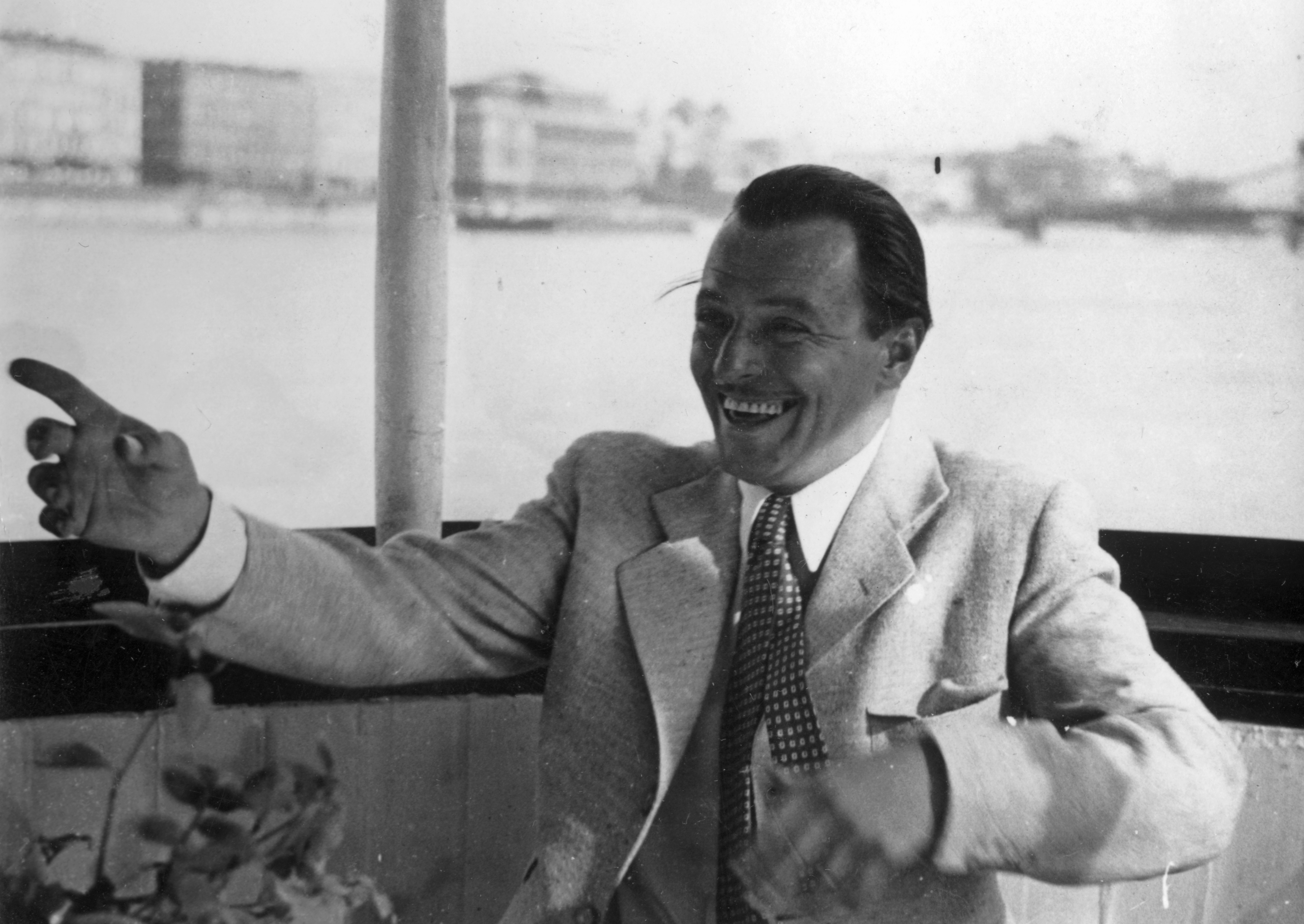
- Actor Pál Jávor on a Danube boat with the Chain Bridge in the background. Fortepan (1940)
- Born: 31 January 1902; Arad, Austria-Hungary (today in Romania)
- Died: 14 August 1959 (aged 57); Budapest, Hungary
- Resting place: Farkasréti Cemetery, Budapest, Hungary
- Occupation: Actor
- Spouse: Olga Landesmann (1934-1984)

Pál Jávor (31 January 1902 – 14 August 1959) was a Hungarian actor, and the country's first male movie star.

== Life ==
=== Early years ===
Pál Jávor (born Pál Jermann) was born 31 January 1902 in Arad to Pál Jermann, a 53-year-old cashier and Katalin Spannenberg, a 17-year-old servant-maiden. His parents, who only married after his birth, had 3 children to care for, which made life hard for the family, who moved often. His mother later opened a grocery store on Arad's Kossuth Street. Jávor was a student in a state operated gymnasium, but often played truant to see movies in the town's two theatres. From very early on, he wanted to break away from his homeland and from the simple life his mother wished for him.

During World War I, he ran away to serve on the front as a courier. He was caught and transported back months later by the military police. In 1918, after the Romanian occupation, having worked as a junior reporter for the Aradi Hírlap, he chose not to take the oath of allegiance of the new state, and set out to emigrate to Denmark, so he could act in the Danish movies he idolized. As the state offered free train tickets to anyone who wished to leave the country, he willingly chose exile from Romania, but his ticket was revoked in Budapest.

=== Theatre life ===
Jávor, now seeking to gain recognition in the Hungarian capital, went to study at the Academy of Drama. Living in great poverty, and expelled from the academy for unknown reasons, he earned his degree at the Actor's Guild School in 1922. Jávor acted in various roles in theatres in Budapest, Székesfehérvár and in several other smaller towns, but his dissolute lifestyle made it hard to work with him. After being banned from the Guild in 1926, he played in small roles in different theatres around the country, and later in Budapest, aided by mentors of the acting community, and slowly gaining the interest of critics. He was a member of the Vígszínház between 1930 and 1935, and later the Nemzeti Színház between 1935 and 1944.

=== Becoming a movie star ===
The opportunity to appear in movies first came in 1929, when he starred in Csak egy kislány van a világon, which was to be the last Hungarian silent film. Ironically, this was also the first one to feature sound, as technicians got hold of the technology during the last days of shooting. This allowed Jávor to sing a song in one of the scenes, which, combined with the charm and temperament that became his later trademark, secured him firm employment in the country's nascent film industry. He took the lead role in the first Hungarian movie with sound, Kék Bálvány, and a smaller one in the second, Hyppolit, a lakáj, which became the first real hit among the public.

Jávor quickly became an idol of the 30s, appearing in numerous movies, but also remained popular on stage. The sudden fame weighed heavily on the young actor, leading to him returning to alcohol and to frequent clashes with co-workers and the then-powerful newspaper owners, resulting in numerous scandals. His life was eased when he met and, in 1934, married Olga Landesmann, a Jewish widow with two children, who provided him with a welcoming home and family.

=== During the war ===
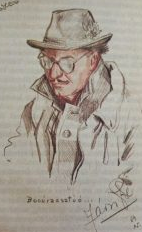
In Sopronkőhida - 1944

After 1940, World War II slowly became a part of life for Hungarian citizens and the theatre world alike, with working conditions becoming increasingly harsher, which Jávor could hardly bear. Being anxious about the theatre regulations, and the defaming of fellow actors, he often clashed with superiors. Charged with making unlawful political comments, he became the target of the Gestapo. After hiding in Balatonfüred and Agárd, he returned to Budapest, thinking that the danger of arrest was over. After another quarrel with the manager of the Actor's Guild, the Guild suspended him from practicing the profession, and also banned his movies.

After the German invasion of Hungary, he was arrested by Arrow Party members. Jávor was first held in the prison of Sopronkőhida under dire conditions, then transported to Germany. After being liberated by Allied forces, he awaited for the end of the war in Tann and Pfarrkirchen. His confinement lasted over nine months, about which he wrote a recollection published in 1946.

After the war, he found that the theatre world had largely rejected him, offering him only a few roles. The intellectual and cultural cleansing of the new Communist government left him virtually no possibilities. Between July and August 1946, Jávor made a successful tour of Romania, and then, on 15 October, after answering several calls, travelled to the United States.

=== Living in the United States ===
After arriving in the United States, he was met with great acclaim by the emigrant community, but despite this, he could only arrange small comedic and musical shows, which he found humiliating. Slowly sinking into depression and reaching again for alcohol, the quality of his shows also sank, emptying audience seats. While he thought about returning home, he received no encouraging news from Hungary, and the increasingly tense political situation also forced him to remain in the States. He traveled to Hollywood to seek film roles, but his limited English left him few possibilities. His best known appearance in a Hollywood movie is probably the small role of famous operatic baritone Antonio Scotti in the hit film The Great Caruso (1951), starring Mario Lanza.

With humiliating castings and low ranking roles he found degrading, Jávor joined a touring group, performing Hungarian hit songs. Later he also worked part-time as a gatekeeper and computer operator. During his 11 years in the US, Jávor met numerous difficulties, but also remembered joyful moments: he wrote numerous articles in American-Hungarian papers, and with his journalist ID he could visit movie theatres for free. Through a voluntary detoxication cure, he gave up alcohol-addiction, and befriended several emigrant artists living in the United States, including Sándor Márai.

=== Final years ===
In 1956, while touring Israel with an occasional group, he learnt that he could finally go home - which he did in 1957, awaited by friends, and jobs in the Jókai and Petőfi theatres. However, the years of hardships were still fresh on Jávor's mind, and several critics found his acting lacking. But his still living legend carried him on, making several successful appearances, and a movie deal.

But his health could not tolerate the high intensity life. While spending over one year in bed, the National Theatre re-hired him, and he was often visited by old friends, also resolving some grudges of the past. His state worsened and, after a seizure, he was transported to a Budapest hospital, where he died on 14 August 1959 from stomach cancer. He was 57 years old

His burial was a theatrical ceremony, his coffin followed by tens of thousands of fans to the Farkasréti Cemetery.

== Legacy ==
Pál Jávor is regarded as one of the most influential actors of Hungarian film, a widely recognized character of his era.

== Filmography ==
- Csak egy kislány van a világon (1929)
- The Blue Idol (1931)
- Hyppolit, a lakáj (1931)
- Miss Iza (1933)
- A bor (1933)
- The Rakoczi March (1933)
- Ida regénye (1934)
- Emmy (1934)
- Thanks for Knocking Me Down (1935)
- The Homely Girl (1935)
- The Students of Igloi (1935)
- Miss President (1935)
- I Can't Live Without Music (1935)
- The New Landlord (1935)
- Salary, 200 a Month (1936)
- Half-Rate Honeymoon (1936)
- Sister Maria (1937)
- Pay Up, Madam! (1937)
- A torockói menyasszony (1937)
- All Men Are Crazy (1937)
- Viki (1937)
- Beauty of the Pusta (1937)
- Maga lesz a férjem (1937)
- Marika (1937)
- Two Prisoners (1938)
- Number 111 (1938)
- Young Noszty and Mary Toth (1938)
- Black Diamonds (1938)
- Bence Uz (1938)
- Stars of Variety (1939)
- Wedding in Toprin (1939)
- The Perfect Man (1939)
- Halálos tavasz (1939)
- Fűszer és csemege (1939)
- Jöjjön elsején! (1940)
- Gül Baba (1940)
- Queen Elizabeth (1940)
- Dankó Pista (1940)
- Yes or No? (1940)
- Much Ado About Emmi (1940)
- Egy csók és más semmi (1940)
- Mirage by the Lake (1940)
- A szerelem nem szégyen (1940)
- Flames (1941)
- Left-Handed Angel (1941)
- Today, Yesterday and Tomorrow (1941)
- Silent Monastery (1941)
- A Bowl of Lentils (1941)
- Three Bells (1941)
- Lelki klinika (1941)
- Életre ítéltek! (1941)
- The Last Song (1942)
- The Talking Robe (1942)
- A Woman Looks Back (1942)
- Guard House Number 5 (1942)
- Carmela (1942)
- Yellow Hell (1942)
- Estélyi ruha kötelező (1942)
- Pista tekintetes úr (1942)
- Ópiumkeringő (1942)
- Késő… (1943)
- The Marsh Flower (1943)
- Makrancos hölgy (1943)
- Kerek Ferkó (1943)
- The White Train (1943)
- Something in the Water (1944)
- Eva Szovathy (1944)
- A Plane Has Not Returned (1944)
- Madách (1944)
- The Schoolmistress (1945)
- The Great Caruso (1951) as Antonio Scotti
- Assignment – Paris! (1952)
