= A Penny's History =

- Directed by: Michael Curtiz
- Release date: 1917
- Country: Hungary
- Language: Hungarian

A Penny's History (Hungarian: Egy krajcár története) is a 1917 Hungarian film directed by Michael Curtiz.
