= The Marriage Market (1941 film) =

1941 film

- Directed by: Félix Podmaniczky
- Written by: József Babay; Félix Podmaniczky
- Based on: Leányvásár by Miksa Bródy and Ferenc Martos
- Produced by: Károly Rostaházy; István Széll
- Starring: Zita Szeleczky; János Sárdy; Manyi Kiss
- Cinematography: Barnabás Hegyi
- Edited by: László Katonka
- Music by: Viktor Jacobi
- Production companies: Imago Film; Magyar Film Iroda
- Release date: 1 October 1941
- Running time: 97 minutes
- Country: Hungary
- Language: Hungarian

The Marriage Market (Hungarian: Leányvásár) is a 1941 Hungarian musical comedy film directed by Félix Podmaniczky and starring Zita Szeleczky, János Sárdy and Manyi Kiss. An operetta film, it is an adaptation of the 1911 stage work of the same title composed by Victor Jacobi. It was shot at the Hunnia Studios in Budapest. The film's sets were designed by the art director István Básthy.

== Synopsis ==
János Gergely returns from Canada with his daughter Lucy. She is very interested in the folk traditions of Transylvania and the famous marriage market held there. Meanwhile, Peter is seeking a debt owed to him by Lucy's father. The two end up being wed in peasant costumes without realising that the marriage is valid.

== Cast ==
- Zita Szeleczky as Gergely Lucy
- János Sárdy as Dr. Haday Péter
- Manyi Kiss as Biri
- Kálmán Latabár as Kázmér
- Piroska Vaszary as Karola
- Tivadar Bilicsi as Dr. Kiss
- Béla Mihályffi as Gergely János
- Zoltán Makláry as Dr. Vincze
- Sándor Tompa as A falu bírója
- Andor Sárossy as Panama-gyanus úr
- László Földényi as Válóperes bíró
- Béla Fáy as Bíró
- Sándor Hidassy as Ruhát kölcsönzõ paraszt
- Gusztáv Harasztos as Anyakönyvvezetõ
- Erzsi Bata as Mándoky Anikó, parasztlány
- Lívia Marsovszky as Kispál Veronika parasztlány
- György Gonda as Paraszt
- Gyula Szöreghy as Rendõr
- Géza Rónai as Rendör
- Gyula Terney as Falusi férfi a leányvásáron
- Gyula Turóczy as Szállodaportás

== Bibliography ==
- Juhász, István. Kincses magyar filmtár 1931-1944: az eredeti forgatókönyvből 1931 és 1944 között létrejött hazai mozgóképekről. Kráter, 2007.
- Rîpeanu, Bujor. (ed.) International Directory of Cinematographers, Set- and Costume Designers in Film: Hungary (from the beginnings to 1988). Saur, 1981.
