= The Relative of His Excellency =

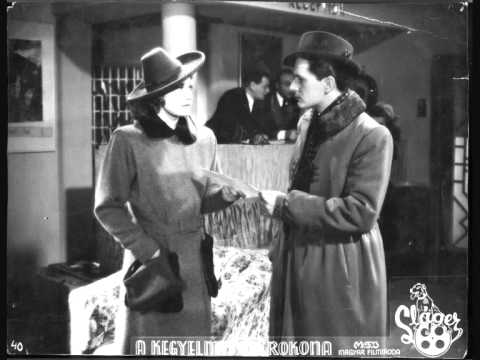
- Hungarian: A kegyelmes úr rokona
- Directed by: Félix Podmaniczky
- Written by: Zoltán Szitnyai (novel); Miklós Asztalos
- Starring: László Szilassy; Erzsi Simor; Artúr Somlay; Zoltán Greguss
- Cinematography: Rudolf Icsey
- Edited by: László Katonka
- Music by: Szabolcs Fényes
- Production company: Magyar Film Iroda
- Release date: 4 March 1941
- Running time: 76 minutes
- Country: Hungary
- Language: Hungarian

'The Relative of His Excellency' (Hungarian:A kegyelmes úr rokona) is a 1941 Hungarian comedy film directed by Félix Podmaniczky and starring László Szilassy, Erzsi Simor and Artúr Somlay. It was based on a novel by Zoltán Szitnyai.

The production manager was Ernő Gottesmann.

== Cast ==
- László Szilassy - Szávay Gábor
- Erzsi Simor - Klára
- Artúr Somlay - Szávay Ákos, Managing Director
- Mária Mezey - Aliz
- Kálmán Rózsahegyi - Kublics
- Gyula Csortos - Rafael
- Zoltán Greguss - Tihamér, Aliz's brother
- Gyula Kőváry - Uncle Józsi
- Sándor Pethes - Ödön
