= Jenő Heltai =

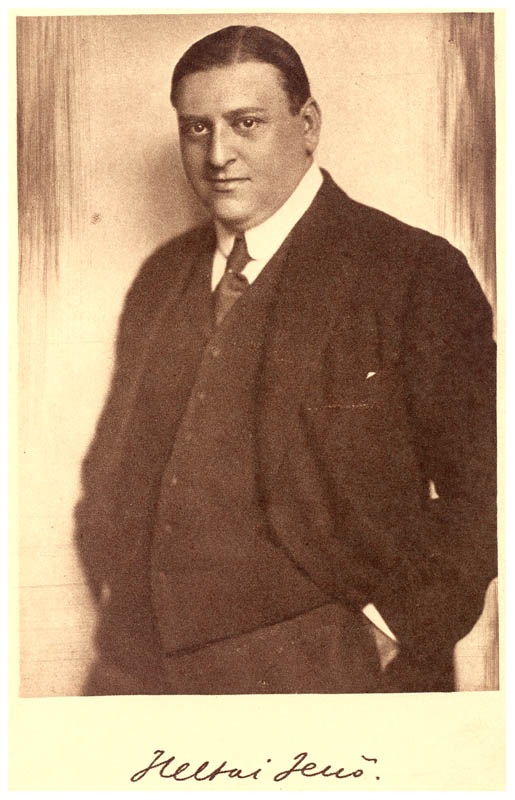
- Jenő Heltai in c. 1910
- Born: Eugen Herzl; 11 August 1871; Pest, Austria-Hungary
- Died: 3 September 1957 (aged 86); Budapest, Hungarian People's Republic
- Occupation: Author
- Notable work: Modern songs (1892)

Jenő Heltai (11 August 1871 – 3 September 1957), until 1913 Eugen Herzl, was a Hungarian author, poet, journalist and producer. Some of his works have also been translated into English and Hebrew among others.

== Biography ==
Jenő Heltai was the first son of Károly Herzl and Jozefa Reich. He was of Jewish descent, though he later converted to Christianity. Several of his novels and plays have been adapted into movies. Theodor Herzl was his cousin. He studied at the Law Faculty of the University of Budapest before he quit his studies in 1890 to become a journalist, working for the newspaper "Magyar Hírlap". In 1892, Heltai published his first book of poetry, Modern dalok. Heltai married his first wife, Hausz Valéria on 3 August 1903.

From 1914 until 1917, Heltai was the director of a Budapest theater. He became the chairman of the Association of Hungarian Playwrights in 1916. In 1917, Heltai divorced his wife and around this time married Frida Gombaszögi. This marriage did not last long, as Heltai married his third wife, Lilla Gács in 1923. All three of his wives were actresses.

Heltai coined the word for cinema in Hungarian, "mozi". He received the Kossuth Prize, the highest literature award in Hungary in 1957. Jenő Heltai died on 3 September 1957 in Budapest.

== Notable works ==
- Modern dalok (Modern songs), 1892, poetry
- Kiskirályok (Little Kings), 1913, novel
- Álmokháza (House of Dreams), 1929, novel
- A néma levente (The Silent Knight), 1936, play
- Egy fillér (One Penny), 1940, play
