= Félix Podmaniczky =

Hungarian film director

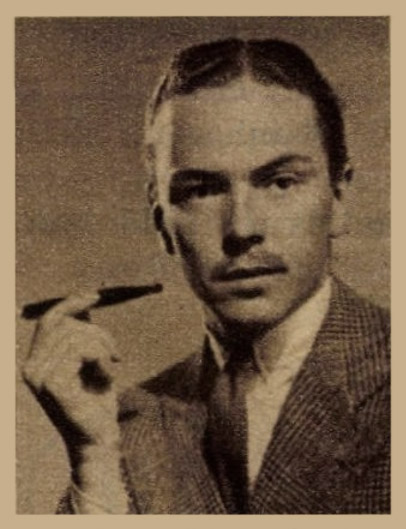
- Podmaniczky in 1941
- Born: January 14, 1914; Budapest, Austro-Hungarian Empire
- Died: July 6, 1990 (aged 76); Munich, West Germany
- Occupations: Director, Screenwriter
- Years active: 1938–1961 (film)
- Spouse: Bilinszky Ibolya (1941)

Félix Podmaniczky (1914–1990) was a Hungarian film director and screenwriter. The son of a baron by background, he was also known as Felix von Podmaniczky. In 1956 he fled Communist Hungary and settled in West Germany, where he made two documentaries.

== Selected filmography ==
- Castle in Transylvania (1940)
- Queen Elizabeth (1940)
- Seven Plum Trees (1940)
- The Relative of His Excellency (1941)
- The Marriage Market (1941)
- Three Bells (1941)
- Gentryfészek (1942)
- Dream Waltz (1943)
- Lejtön (1944)
- Hitler's Executioners (1961)

== Bibliography ==
- Frey, David. Jews, Nazis and the Cinema of Hungary: The Tragedy of Success, 1929–1944. Bloomsbury Publishing, 2017.
- Rîpeanu, Bujor. (ed.) International Directory of Cinematographers, Set- and Costume Designers in Film: Hungary (from the beginnings to 1988). Saur, 1981.
