= Oscar Beregi (actor, born 1876) =

Hungarian actor (1876–1965)

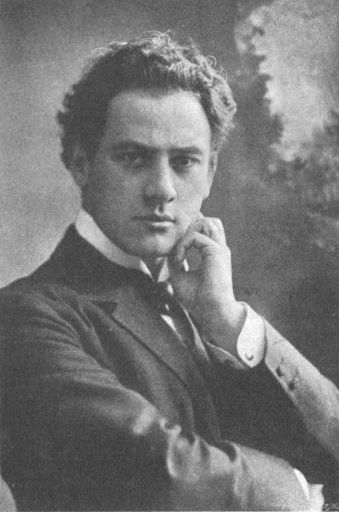
- in 1903
- Born: Oszkár Berger; 24 January 1876; Budapest, Hungary
- Died: 18 October 1965 (aged 89); Hollywood, California, U.S.
- Resting place: Woodlawn Memorial Cemetery, Santa Monica
- Occupation: Actor
- Years active: 1890s-1953
- Children: Oscar Beregi Jr. Lea Beregi

Oscar Beregi (born Oszkár Berger, 24 January 1876 – 18 October 1965) was a Hungarian-Jewish actor who appeared primarily in German films.

== Biography ==
Beregi was born in Budapest, Austria-Hungary. He acted onstage in Hungary for 21 years. In April 1920, as "the only Jewish actor of prominence" acting with the Budapest National Theatre, he was the subject of a demonstration that led to the group's changing its program and presenting a play in which Beregi did not participate.

In the early 1920s, Beregi was exiled from Hungary because of his "alleged political activities". During the exile he acted in Vienna for four years. He served as president of the Film Actors' Association of Vienna. In 1925 he arrived to Hollywood and stayed there for four years. In 1926, Beregi signed a five-year contract with Universal Pictures. During that time the actor was filmed in several silent pictures. The most famous was Camille (1927), opposite Norma Talmadge in the title role.

In the late 1920s, Beregi returned to Europe. In 1933, played one his best-known film roles as the villainous Professor Baum in Fritz Lang's film The Testament of Dr. Mabuse. In the 1930s, he was persecuted because of his Jewish background, narrowly escaped the Holocaust and fled to the United States. There, he played the last few of his film roles, including a supporting role in the 1953 musical Call Me Madam. Overall, Beregi appeared in 27 films between 1916 and 1953. He made his final appearance as a guest star in the TV series Peter Gunn in 1961.

Beregi died in Hollywood, California, aged 89, and was buried in Budapest, Hungary. His son, Oscar Beregi Jr., was also an actor.

== Partial filmography ==
- Ártatlan vagyok! (1916) - Pierre, katonaorvos
- Mire megvénülünk (1917) - Áronffy Lóránd
- Hófehérke (1917) - Balassa Imre mérnök
- The Stork Caliph (1917) - Tábori báró / kikötõmunkás
- A föld embere (1917) - Bán Ferenc, bányamérnök
- Károly bakák (1918) - Epres János
- Az aranyember (Man of Gold) (1919) - Tímár Mihály
- Jön az öcsém ("My Brother is Coming") (1919, Short) - As öcs
- Ave Caesar! (1919) - Alexis gróf, testõrkapitány
- A tékozló fiú (1919) - Wagner Oszkár, a fia
- Meriota the Dancer (1922) - Cesare Borgia
- William Ratcliff (1922)
- Children of the Revolution (1923)
- Das verbotene Land (1924)
- Vier Nächte einer schönen Frau (1924)
- Die Tragödie einer Frau (1924)
- Die Sklavenkönigin ("The Moon of Israel", lit. "The Queen of the Slaves") (1924) - Amenmeses
- Jiskor (1924) - The Count
- Ssanin (1924) - Wladimir Petrowitsch Ssanin
- Das Gift der Borgia (1924)
- The Curse (1925) - Jehuda Nachmann
- The Love Thief (1926) - Prime Minister
- The Flaming Forest (1926) - Jules Lagarre
- Butterflies in the Rain (1926) - Lord Purdon
- Camille (1927) - Count de Varville
- The Woman on Trial (1927)
- Der Geliebte seiner Frau (1928) - Polizeikommissär Ralph Förster
- Andere Frauen (1928)
- Povara (1928) - George Stralila
- Love in May (1928)
- Der Dieb im Schlafcoupée (1929)
- Die Jugend am Scheideweg (1929)
- Juwelen (1930)
- The Blue Idol (1931) - Turner, milliomos
- An Auto and No Money (1932)
- The Ghost Train (1933) - Dr. Stirling
- Das Testament des Dr. Mabuse ("The Testament of Dr. Mabuse") (1933) - Prof. Dr. Baum
- Miss Iza (1933)
- The Rakoczi March (1933) - Báró Merlin Ádám, földbirtokos
- Anything Can Happen (1952) - Uncle John
- Tonight We Sing (1953) - Dr. Markoff (uncredited)
- Call Me Madam (1953) - Chamberlain (uncredited)
- Desert Legion (1953) - Si Khalil
