= Kató Bárczy =

Hungarian actress (1921–1989)

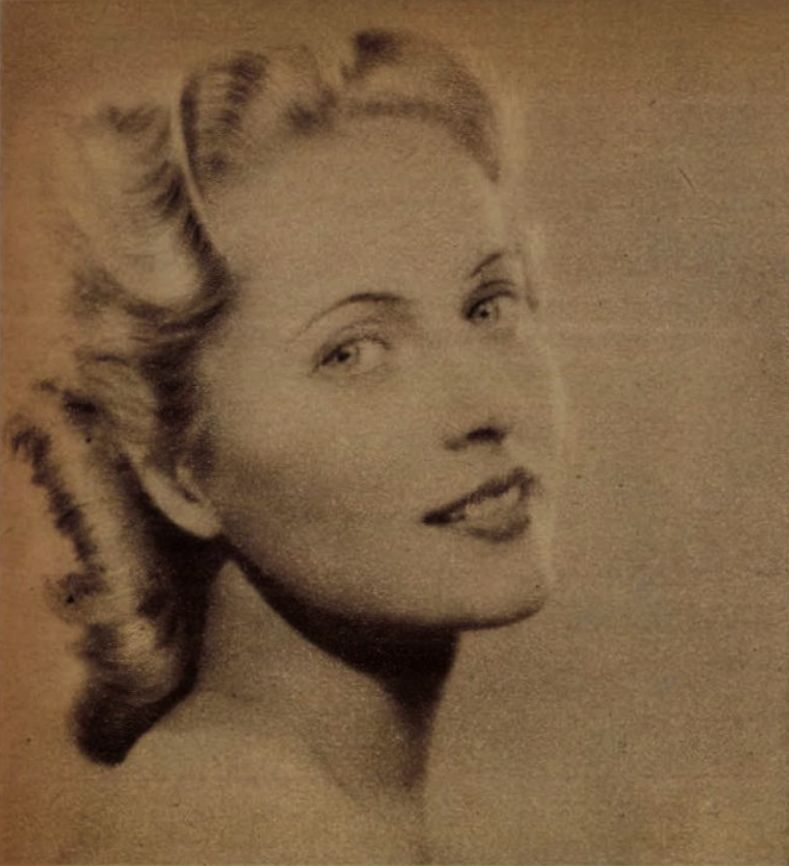
- Bárczy in 1942
- Born: 24 January 1921; Opatija, Yugoslavia
- Died: 20 June 1989 (aged 68); Budapest, Hungary
- Occupation: Actress
- Spouse: Sándor Szabó

Kató Bárczy (24 January 1921 – 20 June 1989) was a Hungarian actress, and the wife of the actor Sándor Szabó.

== Biography ==
She first played in 1935 in the theatre of her step-father, László Radó. She married in 1939 and left the stages for a period. She played at Royal Revü Varieté in 1941–1942, at Márkus Park Színház in 1943, at Pódium Kabaré and Royal Revü Varietében in 1945, at Művész and Medgyaszay between 1946 and 1948, at Víg Színház in 1948, at Modern Színház, Vidám Színpad and Royal Revü Varieté in 1949, at Miskolci Nemzeti Színház in 1950. Between 1950 and 1956 she was a member of Madách Színház. She lived in the US from 1957 to 1975, then she moved back to Hungary.
