= Piri Vaszary =

Hungarian actress (1901–1965)

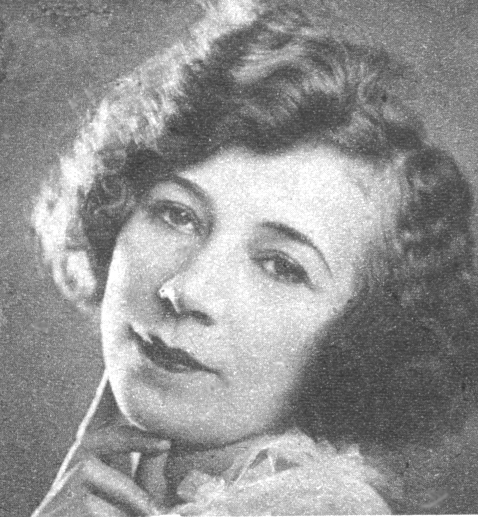
- Vaszary before 1930
- Born: Piroska Vaszary; 19 May 1901; Budapest, Hungary
- Died: 2 October 1965 (aged 64); Palma de Mallorca, Spain
- Occupation: Actress
- Family: Gábor Vaszary (brother); Johann von Vásáry (brother); János Vaszary (uncle)

Piroska "Piri" Vaszary (19 May 1901 – 2 October 1965) was a Hungarian film actress.

== Life ==
=== Family ===
Born 19 May 1901 in Budapest, Piroska's father was Gábor Vaszary (born in Kaposvár, on 13 March 1866) main-notar of Budapest, her mother was Auguszta Csipka. Her brothers were Gábor Vaszary (or Gábor von Vaszary) (7 June 1897 in Budapest – 22 May 1985) a Hungarian novelist and screenwriter, who emigrated to Switzerland and Johann von Vásáry or János Vaszary (1899–1963) a Hungarian actor, screenwriter, playwright and film director, Lili Muráti's husband. Her uncle was János Vaszary (30 November 1867 – 19 April 1939) a Hungarian painter and graphic artist. Her grand-grandfather's half-brother was Kolos Ferenc Vaszary, O.S.B. (12 February 1832 in Keszthely, Hungary – 3 September 1915 in Balatonfüred, Hungary) a cardinal of the Roman Catholic Church, archbishop of Esztergom.

=== Career ===
She has been close her studies in Szidi Rákosi's Academy of Theatre in 1920. After she played in a lot of theatres in Budapest. In the end of 1944 she emigrated to Austria, after to Germany. She lived in France, in Spain, in Argentina, in Venezuela and in Canada. From 1948 until 1954 played in Argentinian Hungarian Society of Theater, in 1959 also in Venezuela.

She has already starred in silent films, "The Miracle Doctor" and "The Lady of the East," as well as in an audio film initiative, "Laughing Lady." He became a constant comedian in Hungarian films. She shaped her roles with exceptional caricature. She also appeared in the German film "Spring Parade" in 1935. She was also popular with her cabaret couples. She has appeared in many audio films.

=== Private life ===
She was married three times. In 1924 she married Andor Feld, an industrialist, from whom she divorced in 1926. Her second husband from 1929, was Árpád Horváth became the director of National Theatre (Budapest), from whom she also divorced in 1932. Thirdly, she married the physician Endre Bodócsy (in Budapest, Erzsébetváros, on 14 June 1932). They had two children, Piroska (26 April 1933) and in 1942 Endre.

She died on 2 October 1965 in Palma de Mallorca, Spain.

== Selected filmography ==
- Kiss Me, Darling (1932)
- Spring Parade (1934)
- Hello, Budapest! (1935)
- Kind Stepmother (1935)
- Address Unknown (1935)
- I Can't Live Without Music (1935)
- The Empress and the Hussar (1935)
- It Was Me (1936)
- All Men Are Crazy (1937)
- Tokay Rhapsody (1937)
- Mother (1937)
- Sweet Revenge (1937)
- I May See Her Once a Week (1937)
- Family Bonus (1937)
- Sister Maria (1937)
- Help, I'm an Heiress (1937)
- The Borrowed Castle (1937)
- The Poor Rich (1938)
- Rosemary (1938)
- The Henpecked Husband (1938)
- The Wrong Man (1938)
- The Witch of Leányvár (1938)
- Barbara in America (1938)
- Stars of Variety (1939)
- Money Is Coming (1939)
- The Five-Forty (1939)
- On the Way Home (1940)
- Castle in Transylvania (1940)
- You Are the Song (1940)
- Haunting Spirit (1940)
- Closed Court (1940)
- The Last of the Vereczkeys (1940)
- The Bercsenyi Hussars (1940)
- Yes or No? (1940)
- Seven Plum Trees (1940)
- The Chequered Coat (1940)
- Duel for Nothing (1940)
- Shako and Hat (1941)
- Today, Yesterday and Tomorrow (1941)
- Left-Handed Angel (1941)
- The Marriage Market (1941)
- Property for Sale (1941)
- Europe Doesn't Answer (1941)
- Entry Forbidden (1941)
- Sister Beáta (1941)
- Kádár Versus Kerekes (1942)
- The Talking Robe (1942)
- The Perfect Family (1942)
- Magdolna (1942)
- Dr. Kovács István (1942)
- Borrowed Husbands (1942)
- Katyi (1942)
- Quite a Lad (1943)
- Kerek Ferkó (1943)
- Mouse in the Palace (1943)
- Orient Express (1943)
- African Bride (1944)
- Wildfire (1944)
- I'll Make You Happy (1944)

== Bibliography ==
- Simon, Andrew L. Made in Hungary: Hungarian Contributions to Universal Culture. Simon Publications, 1998.
