= A Night in Venice =

A Night in Venice may refer to:

- Eine Nacht in Venedig, an 1883 operetta with music by Johann Strauss II
- A Night in Venice (1934 German film), an adaptation of the operetta
- A Night in Venice (1934 Hungarian film), an adaptation of the operetta
- A Night in Venice (1953 film), an Austrian adaptation of the operetta
