= Emmi Buttykay =

Hungarian actress (1911–1957)

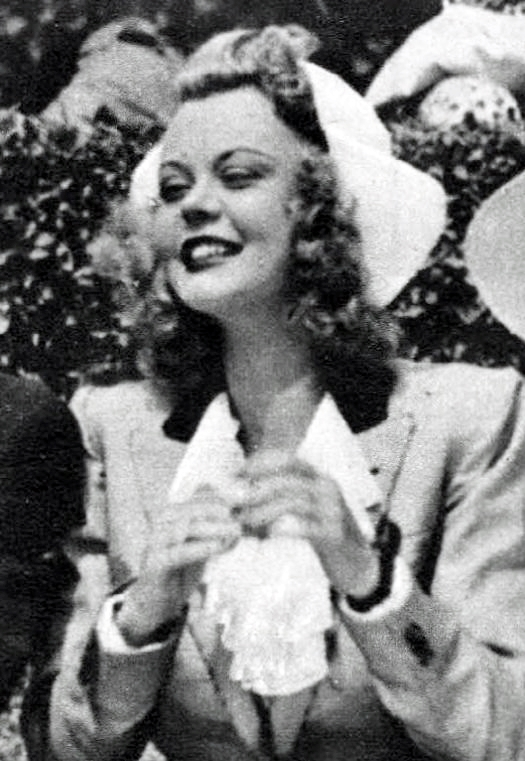
- Buttykay in 1943
- Born: 4 May 1911; Budapest, Austro-Hungarian Empire
- Died: 5 July 1957 (aged 46); London, England
- Occupation: Actress
- Years active: 1932–1956 (film)

Emmi Buttykay (4 May 1911 – 5 July 1957) was a Hungarian stage and film actress. She often appeared onstage in operettas. She made her screen debut in the 1932 film Flying Gold and appeared in supporting roles. She enjoyed brief film stardom in Wartime Hungary in films directed by Viktor Bánky. After the war she appeared in Professor Hannibal in 1956. The following year she died on a visit to London.

== Selected filmography ==
- Flying Gold (1932)
- Romance in Budapest (1933)
- Address Unknown (1935)
- Ball at the Savoy (1935)
- Europe Doesn't Answer (1941)
- We'll Know By Midnight (1942)
- Makacs Kata (1943)
- Kölcsönadott élet (1943)
- I'll Make You Happy (1944)
- The State Department Store (1953)
- Professor Hannibal (1956)

== Bibliography ==
- Nemeskürty, István & Szántó, Tibor. A Pictorial Guide to the Hungarian Cinema, 1901–1984. Helikon, 1985.
- Töteberg, Michael (ed.) Metzler Film Lexikon. Springer-Verlag, 2016.
