= Margit Lukács =

Hungarian actress (1914–2002)

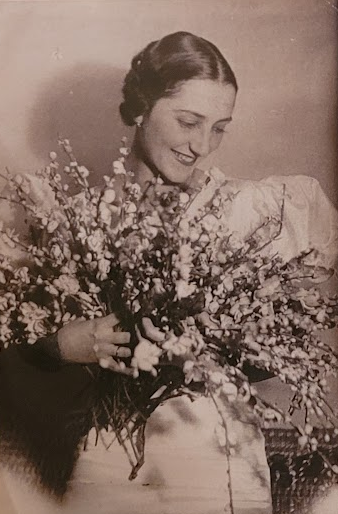
- Lukács in 1935
- Born: 22 December 1914; Budapest, Austro-Hungarian Empire
- Died: 3 February 2002 (aged 87); Budapest, Hungary
- Occupation: Actress
- Years active: 1938–1992 (film)

Margit Lukács (22 December 1914 – 3 February 2002) was a Hungarian stage and film actress. In her early career she played female leads in a number of films, notably Dankó Pista (1940) which was screened at the Venice Film Festival. Onstage she was a longstanding member of the National Theatre in Budapest.

== Selected filmography ==
- The Poor Rich (1938)
- Dankó Pista (1940)
- Matthew Arranges Things (1940)
- Silent Monastery (1941)
- Silenced Bells (1941)
- Black Dawn (1943)
- A Plane Has Not Returned (1944)
- Centaurs (1978)
- Oh, Bloody Life (1984)

== Bibliography ==
- Fekete, Márton. Prominent Hungarians: Home and Abroad. Szepsi Csombor Literary Circle, 1979.
- Laura, Ernesto G. Tutti i film di Venezia, 1932–1984. La Biennale, Settore cinema e spettacolo televisivo, 1985.
- Nemeskürty, István & Szántó, Tibor. A Pictorial Guide to the Hungarian Cinema, 1901-1984. Helikon, 1985.
