= Dénes von Buday =

Hungarian composer

Dénes Buday
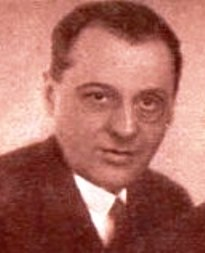
- Born: 8 October 1890; Budapest, Hungary
- Died: 19 October 1963 (aged 73); Budapest, Hungary
- Occupations: pianist, composer
- Years active: 1910-1956

Buday Dénes (Denes von Buday) was a Hungarian composer, born in Budapest. He was a well known composer of both poems and music for films made between 1930 and 1950. Buday studied at the Academy of Music, which is today known as the Franz Liszt Academy of Music, where his teacher, Hans von Koessler, held his lectures in German.

== Work ==
=== Opera ===
Buday's only opera, the comedy Loreley, premiered in 1919 in Vienna.

=== Operettas ===
Buday authored many operettas and musical comedies, which were shown on stage between 1916 and 1947.

Title	Year	Libretto, Co-author	Approximate English Translation
Fogadjuk!	1916	Imre Harmath	I'll Bet You That...
Teca meg akar halni	1916	Zsolt Harsányi	Teca Wants to Die
Menüett	1917	Imre Harmath	Minuet
A paradicsommadár	1918	Gyula Kőváry	The Bird of Paradise
A kék postakocsi	1919	László Szilágyi (Árpád Latabár)	The Blue Stage-Coach
Öt év után	1919	Gyula Kőváry	After Five Years
Csengődi harangok	1924	Zsolt Harsányi	The Bells of Csengőd
Pipafüst	1924	Elek Erdődy	Smoke of Pipe
Császárné!	1924	Andor Zsoldos	Empress
A haláltánc	1926	Imre Harmath	Dance Macabre
Ki a Tisza vizét issza	1926	Imre Harmath	Those Who Drink the Water of Tisza
Diákszerelem	1927	Ernő Andai, Ernő Innocent-Vince	Calf-love
Erdélyi diákok	1929	Ernő Andai, Ernő Innocent-Vince	Transylvanian Students
A csodahajó	1935	Dezső Kellér, Imre Harmath	The Wonder-boat
Sonja	1936	Dezső Kellér, Imre Harmath	Sonia
Csárdás	1936	László Szilágyi	Czardas
Szakítani nehéz dolog	1936	Mihály Szécsén, Kálmán Csathó	Hard to Break-away
Farsangi esküvő	1939	László Zalai Szalay	Wedding at Carnival
Három huszár	1940	László Szilágyi, Gyula Halász	Three Hussars
Csodatükör	1941	József Babay	Wonder Mirror
Fityfiritty	1941	Rudolf Halász	Immodest Gal
Egy boldog pesti nyár	1943	Mihály Eisemann, Szabolcs Fényes	A Happy Summer in Pest
A tábornokné	1943	Miklós Tóth, Kálmán Vándor	The Wife of the General
Meztelen lány	1946	Gábor Vaszary	Naked Girl
Három szegény szabólegény	1947	József Babay	Three Poor Young Tailors

== Movie composer ==
Year	Original title	Director	Actor
1936	Opernring	Carmine Gallone	Jan Kiepura
1936	Blumen aus Nizza	Augusto Genina	
1937	Mámi (The Old Lady)	János Vásáry	Sári Fedák
1937	Premiere ("Das Buch der Liebe", "Ich hab' vielleicht noch nie geliebt")	Walter Summers, Géza von Bolváry	Zarah Leander
1938	Varjú a toronyórán (Crow on the Tower)	Endre Rodríguez	Gábor Rajnay
1938	Tizenhárom kislány mosolyog az égre (13 Girls Smile at the Sky)	Ákos Ráthonyi	Imre Ráday
1938	A 111-es	Székely István	Pál Jávor
1938	Az ember néha téved (Man Sometime Errs)	Béla Gaál	
1939	Zwischen Strom und Steppe (Gypsy Ways)	Géza von Bolváry	
1939	Tiszavirág (Flower of the Tisza)	Géza von Bolváry	Klári Tolnay
1939	Magyar feltámadás (Hungary's Revival)	Jenő Csepreghy, Ferenc Kiss	
1939	Áll a bál (Valzer d'amore, Italian title)	Viktor Bánky	Zita Szeleczky
1940	Igen vagy nem? (Da ili ne, Serbian title)	Viktor Bánky	Lili Muráti
1940	Hazafelé (Homeward)	Cserépy Arzén	Sári Fedák
1941	Végre! (Finalmente! Italian title)	Zoltán Farkas	Lili Muráti
1941	Elkésett levél (Letter, too late)	Endre Rodríguez	Éva Szörényi
1942	Férfihűség (Weil ich dich liebe, German title)	József Daróczy	
1942	Üzenet a Volgapartról (Message from the banks of the Volga)	Deésy Alfréd	János Sárdy, tenor
1942	Egy szív megáll (A Heart Attack)	László Kalmár	Katalin Karády
1942	Szakítani nehéz dolog (Hard to Break with Her) lost film	Emil Martonffy	Gábor Rajnay
1942	Gyávaság (Cowardliness)	Nádasdy Kálmán	Vera Sennyei
1943	Tilos a szerelem (The Love is Prohibited)	László Kalmár	
1943	Miért? (La signorina terremoto, Italian title)	József Daróczy	Lili Muráti
1943	Kalotaszegi Madonna (title of a painting)	Endre Rodríguez	János Sárdy
1943	Szerelmi láz (Love Fever)	István Lázár Jr.	Gyula Csortos, Margit Dajka
1943	Zenélő malom (Musical Mill, Musical editor)	István Lázár Jr.	Zita Szeleczky
1943	Késő (Late)	József Daróczy	Jávor Pál
1943	Pista tekintetes úr (Respectful Pista)	József Daróczy	Jávor Pál
1944	Zörgetnek az ablakon (Knock on the Window)	László Sipos	
1944	A hangod elkísér (Accompanied by Your Voice) (as conductor)	Ágoston Pacséry	Katalin Karády
1944	Nászinduló (Wedding March)	Zoltán Farkas	Zita Szeleczky
1948	Valahol Európában (It Happened in Europe)	Géza von Radványi	Artúr Somlay
1956	Ünnepi vacsora (...aber die Verwandten, German title)	György Révész	
After the composer's death, soundtracks:
1999	A napfény íze ("Ezzel a kis dallal", "Minden kislány")	István Szabó	
2003	Rosenstrasse ("Ich hab vielleicht noch nie geliebt")	Margarethe von Trotta	

== Book Reference ==
- Kürti, László (2001). The Remote Borderland: Transylvania. State University of New York Press. ISBN 0791450244.
- Székey, György (1994). Magyar Színházművészeti Lexikon. Budapest: Akadémiai Kiadó. p. 888. ISBN 9630566354.
