= The Ball Is On =

1939 film

- Directed by: Viktor Bánky
- Written by: József Babay; Pál Barabás; Viktor Bánky; István Békeffy
- Produced by: József Daróczy
- Starring: Zita Szeleczky; Erzsi Simor; Hilda Gobbi
- Cinematography: István Eiben
- Edited by: Zoltán Farkas
- Music by: Dénes Buday
- Production company: Hunnia Filmgyár
- Release date: 28 September 1939
- Running time: 104 minutes
- Country: Hungary
- Language: Hungarian

The Ball Is On (Hungarian: Áll a bál) is a 1939 Hungarian romantic comedy film directed by Viktor Bánky and starring Zita Szeleczky, Erzsi Simor and Hilda Gobbi. It was shot at the Hunnia Studios in Budapest and on location in Warsaw shortly before the outbreak of the Second World War. The film's sets were designed by the art director Márton Vincze.

== Cast ==
- Zita Szeleczky as Erzsébet - Tassy lánya
- Erzsi Simor as Viera Gorbuskin
- Hilda Gobbi as Caroline bárónõ
- Margit Ladomerszky as Lujza hercegné
- Erzsébet Gyöngyössy as Tassy herceg húga
- Irén Sitkey as Grófné
- Erzsébet Tapolczay as Bálozó lány
- Gizi Hernády as Vendég a bálon
- Magda Horváth as Társasági hölgy
- Magda Tolnay as Társasági hölgy
- Gyula Csortos as Tassy herceg
- Jenö Pataky as András, Balogh fia
- Imre Toronyi as Balogh, jószágigazgató
- Tivadar Bilicsi as Selmeczi Sebestyén
- Lajos Köpeczi Boócz as Gorbuskin
- Béla Mihályffi as Államtitkár
- Zoltán Szakáts as Misley - a követ titkára
- György Dénes as Lengyel külügyi titkár
- László Földényi as Varsói követ
- Elemér Thury as Nyomozó
- Pál Vessely as Trónörökös
- György Gonda as Hírszerzõ
- Gusztáv Vándory as Az államtitkár titkára
- Gusztáv Harasztos as Nyomozó
- Nándor Bihary as Szása,az iszákos
- Ferenc Antók as államtitkár segédje
- József Berky as Kártyázó
- Anni Eisen as Vendég a bálon
- István Kovács actor) as Sofõr
- Ferenc Pataki as Ajtónálló lakáj a bálon
- Dezsõ Pártos as Elõkelõ úr a bálon
- Éva Serényi as Bálozó lány
- Lajos Sugár as Gróf
- Gyula Szöreghy as Lengyel bandita
- Pál Turgonyi as A trónörökös segédtisztje
- Ilona Vécsey as Társaságbeli hölgy
- Gyula Zordon as detektív Varsóban

== Bibliography ==
- Juhász, István. Kincses magyar filmtár 1931-1944: az eredeti forgatókönyvből 1931 és 1944 között létrejött hazai mozgóképekről. Kráter, 2007.
- Rîpeanu, Bujor. (ed.) International Directory of Cinematographers, Set- and Costume Designers in Film: Hungary (from the beginnings to 1988). Saur, 1981.
