= Tivadar Bilicsi =

Hungarian actor

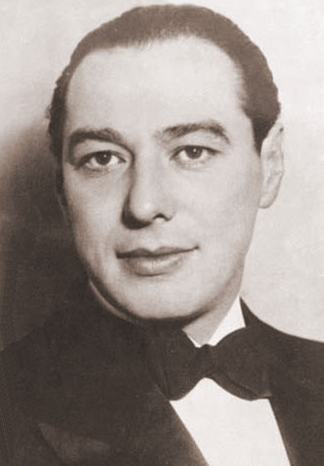
- Bilicsi in 1935
- Born: 6 September 1901; Budapest, Austria-Hungary
- Died: 11 July 1981 (aged 79); Siófok, Hungary
- Occupation: Actor
- Years active: 1932–1978 (film & TV)

Tivadar Bilicsi (6 September 1901–11 July 1981) was a Hungarian film, stage and television actor, known for his comic roles. He performed in over a hundred film or television productions.

== Selected filmography ==
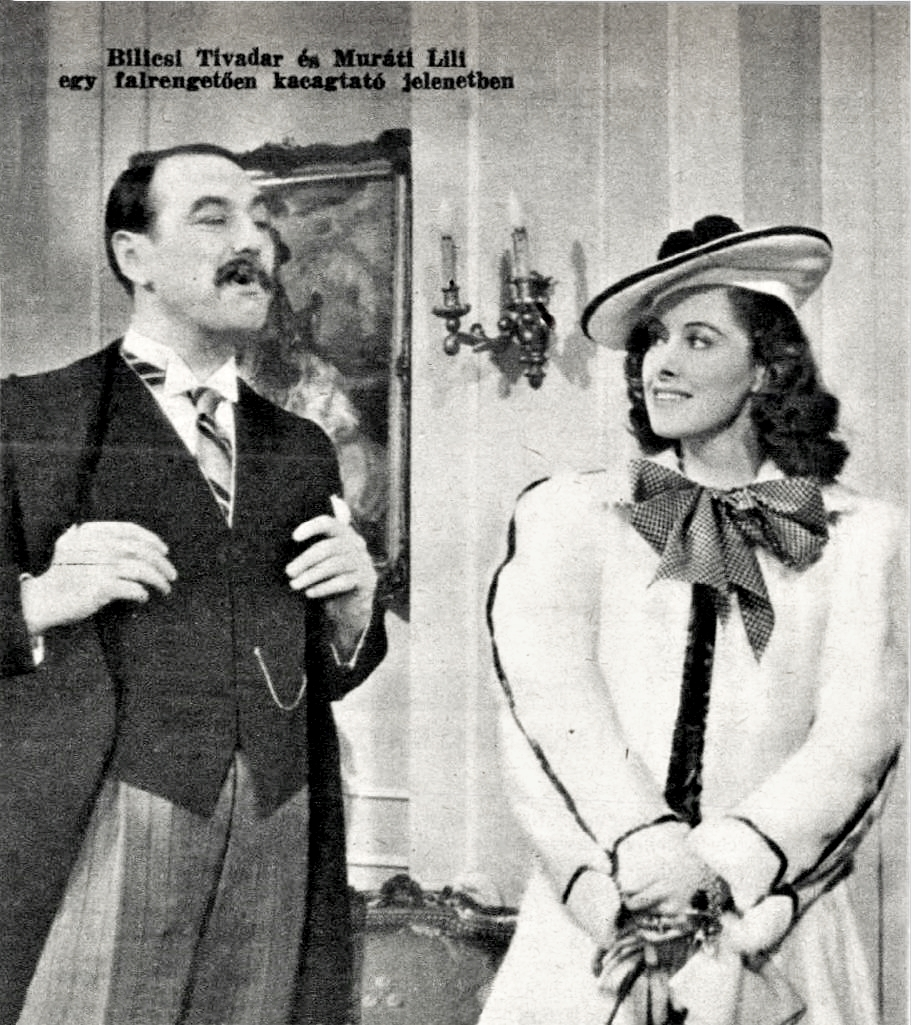
With Lili Muráti in the 1943 film It Begins with Marriage.

- The Old Scoundrel (1932)
- And the Plains Are Gleaming (1933)
- The New Landlord (1935)
- Villa for Sale (1935)
- The Golden Man(1936)
- Tales of Budapest (1937)
- Tokay Rhapsody (1937)
- The Mysterious Stranger (1937)
- Sweet Revenge (1937)
- Family Bonus (1937)
- There Are Exceptions (1937)
- Billeting (1938)
- Young Noszty and Mary Toth (1938)
- Man Sometimes Errs (1938)
- Bence Uz (1938)
- Two Prisoners (1938)
- The Henpecked Husband (1938)
- The Witch of Leányvár (1938)
- The Ball Is On (1939)
- Money Is Coming (1939)
- Princess of the Puszta (1939)
- Janos the Valiant (1939)
- Deadly Spring (1939)
- The Perfect Man (1939)
- Much Ado About Emmi (1940)
- The Unquiet Night (1940)
- On the Way Home (1940)
- The Last of the Vereczkeys (1940)
- Queen Elizabeth (1940)
- Landslide (1940)
- Seven Plum Trees (1940)
- Semmelweis (1940)
- Prince Bob (1941)
- Let's Love Each Other (1941)
- Old Waltz (1941)
- The Marriage Market (1941)
- Finally! (1941)
- Entry Forbidden (1941)
- Costume Ball (1942)
- The Dance of Death (1942)
- Borrowed Husbands (1942)
- Time of Trial (1942)
- The Talking Robe (1942)
- Katyi (1942)
- Magdolna (1942)
- Siamese Cat (1943)
- It Begins with Marriage (1943)
- The White Train (1943)
- The Night Serenade (1943)
- I Dreamed of You (1943)
- Déryné (1951)
- Semmelweis (1952)

== Bibliography ==
- Juhász, István. Kincses magyar filmtár 1931-1944: az eredeti forgatókönyvből 1931 és 1944 között létrejött hazai mozgóképekről. Kráter, 2007.
- Simon, Andrew L. Made in Hungary: Hungarian Contributions to Universal Culture. Simon Publications, 1998.
