= Flames (1941 film) =

1941 film

- Directed by: László Kalmár
- Written by: Miklós Asztalos; József Babay
- Produced by: Antal Takács
- Starring: Pál Jávor; Ferenc Kiss; Valéria Hidvéghy
- Cinematography: István Eiben
- Edited by: Zoltán Kerényi
- Music by: Szabolcs Fényes
- Production company: Hunnia Filmstúdió
- Distributed by: Takács Film
- Release date: 23 October 1941
- Running time: 90 minutes
- Country: Hungary
- Language: Hungarian

Flames (Hungarian: Lángok) is a 1941 Hungarian drama film directed by László Kalmár and starring Pál Jávor, Ferenc Kiss and Valéria Hidvéghy. It was shot at the Hunnia Studios in Budapest. The film's sets were designed by the art director Márton Vincze. It premiered at the 1941 Venice Film Festival. It enjoyed huge commercial success in neighbouring Yugoslavia, particularly in Croatia.

== Synopsis ==
Barbara is in a loveless marriage with her wealthy bank manager husband. She embarks on a passionate affair with a pianist but gives him up for the sake of her family and begs her husband's forgiveness.

== Cast ==
- Pál Jávor as Mátrai Péter, pianist
- Ferenc Kiss as Bogáti Gábor, bank manager
- Mária Mezei as Barbara, wife of Bogáti
- Valéria Hidvéghy as Éva, stepdaughter of Barbara
- Zoltán Makláry as Private detective
- Béla Mihályffi as Kelemen
- Teri Náray as Chambermaid
- György Kürthy as Friend of Mátrai
- Ibolya Bilinszky as Vendor of recordshop
- Lajos Sugár as Doctor
- Gyula Kompóthy as Valet
- István Falussy as Colleague of Bogáti
- Gusztáv Vándory as Colleague of Bogáti
- Anni Eisen as Nurse

== Bibliography ==
- Frey, David. Jews, Nazis and the Cinema of Hungary: The Tragedy of Success, 1929-1944. Bloomsbury Publishing, 2017.
- Juhász, István. Kincses magyar filmtár 1931-1944: az eredeti forgatókönyvből 1931 és 1944 között létrejött hazai mozgóképekről. Kráter, 2007.
- Rîpeanu, Bujor. (ed.) International Directory of Cinematographers, Set- and Costume Designers in Film: Hungary (from the beginnings to 1988). Saur, 1981.
