= Dankó Pista =

1940 film

- Directed by: László Kalmár
- Written by: Sándor Nagymihály (novel); László Bihari; László Kalmár
- Produced by: Miklós Szalontai Kiss
- Starring: Pál Jávor; Erzsi Simor; Margit Lukács
- Cinematography: István Eiben
- Edited by: Zoltán Kerényi
- Music by: Jenö Sándor
- Production company: Mester Film
- Release dates: 9 September 1940 (Venice); 16 January 1941 (Budapest)
- Running time: 95 minutes
- Country: Hungary
- Language: Hungarian

Dankó Pista is a 1940 Hungarian drama film directed by László Kalmár and starring Pál Jávor, Erzsi Simor and Margit Lukács. It premiered at the Venice Film Festival. The film enjoyed particular success on its release in Norway. The film's sets were designed by the art director Márton Vincze.

== Cast ==
- Pál Jávor as Dankó Pista
- Erzsi Simor as Jáky Ilonka
- Margit Lukács as Rózsi
- Sándor Tompa as Kukac
- Kálmán Rózsahegyi as Marci bácsi
- Béla Mihályffi as Ilonka apja
- Juliska Ligeti as Ilonka anyja
- Zoltán Szakáts as Bandi, az udvarló
- György Kürthy as Rózsa Lajos
- György Solthy as Vladimír nagyherceg
- Géza Földessy as Vladimír segédttisztje
- Lajos Sugár as Konferanszié
- Gusztáv Vándory as Orvos
- Andor Sárossy as Mulató úr

== Bibliography ==
- Frey, David. Jews, Nazis and the Cinema of Hungary: The Tragedy of Success, 1929-1944. Bloomsbury Publishing, 2017.
- Juhász, István. Kincses magyar filmtár 1931-1944: az eredeti forgatókönyvből 1931 és 1944 között létrejött hazai mozgóképekről. Kráter, 2007.
- Rîpeanu, Bujor. (ed.) International Directory of Cinematographers, Set- and Costume Designers in Film: Hungary (from the beginnings to 1988). Saur, 1981.
