= Yes or No? (1940 film) =

1940 film

- Directed by: Viktor Bánky
- Written by: Miklós Asztalos; Johann von Vásáry
- Produced by: József Daróczy; Eta Hajdú
- Starring: Lili Muráti; Pál Jávor; Antal Páger
- Cinematography: István Eiben
- Edited by: Zoltán Farkas
- Music by: Dénes Buday
- Production company: Hajdu Film
- Release date: 26 September 1940
- Running time: 73 minutes
- Country: Hungary
- Language: Hungarian

Yes or No? (Hungarian: Igen vagy nem?) is a 1940 Hungarian comedy film directed by Viktor Bánky and starring Lili Muráti, Pál Jávor and Antal Páger. It was shot at the Hunnia Studios in Budapest. The film's sets were designed by the art director Márton Vincze.

== Cast ==
- Lili Muráti as Judit
- Éva Szörényi as
- Pál Jávor as Ifj. Péteri János, Mérnök
- Antal Páger as Id. Péteri János, földbirtokos
- Piroska Vaszary as Kató, szakácsnõ
- Manyi Kiss as Mûvésznõ
- Gizi Hernády as Klári szobalánya
- Gerö Mály as Inas
- Sándor Pethes as Dr. Szekeres
- Gyula Köváry as Mr. Kennedy
- Kálmán Rózsahegyi as Vidéki földbirtokos
- György Dénes as Pletykás úriember
- György Kürthy as Elnök
- Sándor Naszódy as Biciklis fiatalember
- Ferenc Pataki as Bárpincér
- Terka Császár as szakácsnö Klárinál
- Pál Vessely
- Lajos Sugár
- Hilda Gobbi

== Bibliography ==
- Frey, David. Jews, Nazis and the Cinema of Hungary: The Tragedy of Success, 1929-1944. Bloomsbury Publishing, 2017.
- Juhász, István. Kincses magyar filmtár 1931–1944: az eredeti forgatókönyvből 1931 és 1944 között létrejött hazai mozgóképekről. Kráter, 2007.
- Rîpeanu, Bujor. (ed.) International Directory of Cinematographers, Set- and Costume Designers in Film: Hungary (from the beginnings to 1988). Saur, 1981.
- Vilmos, Várkonyi. Jávor Pál: és a magyar film aranykora. Zima Szabolcs, 2013
