= Property for Sale =

1941 film

- Directed by: Viktor Bánky
- Written by: Kálmán Mikszáth (novel); Zsolt Harsányi
- Produced by: Jenõ Katona
- Starring: Zita Szeleczky; Antal Páger; Hilda Gobbi
- Cinematography: Rudolf Icsey
- Edited by: László Katonka
- Music by: Gyula Balázs; Lóránd Fráter
- Production company: Erdélyi Filmgyártó
- Distributed by: Magyar Film Iroda
- Release date: 3 January 1941
- Running time: 86 minutes
- Country: Hungary
- Language: Hungarian

Property for Sale (Hungarian: Eladó birtok) is a 1941 Hungarian romantic comedy film directed by Viktor Bánky and starring Zita Szeleczky, Antal Páger and Hilda Gobbi. The film's sets were designed by the art director Mátyás Varga.

== Cast ==
- Zita Szeleczky as Borcsányi Éva
- Antal Páger as Marjánszky Mihály
- Hilda Gobbi as Emma néni
- Béla Mihályffi as Marjánszky Péter
- Ferenc Pethes as Jóska, kocsis
- Piroska Vaszary as Zsizsi néni
- Erzsi Bata as Parasztmenyasszony
- Nándor Bihary as Szállodapincér
- Terka Császár as Parasztasszony
- Ilona Dajbukát as Kártonyné
- György Gonda as Betyár
- Lajos Gárday as Szurina Mihály
- Panni Kéry as Anikó
- Lajos Köpeczi Boócz as Hange, bankigazgató
- Sándor Orbán as énekes
- Ferenc Pataki as kocsis Borcsányiéknál, Anikó apja
- József Pataky as Kártony, számadó juhász
- Zoltán Pethö as Szállodaportás
- Imre Toronyi as Borcsányi Mihály
- Pál Vessely as Cigányprímás

== Bibliography ==
- Frey, David. Jews, Nazis and the Cinema of Hungary: The Tragedy of Success, 1929-1944. Bloomsbury Publishing, 2017.
- Juhász, István. Kincses magyar filmtár 1931-1944: az eredeti forgatókönyvből 1931 és 1944 között létrejött hazai mozgóképekről. Kráter, 2007.
- Rîpeanu, Bujor. (ed.) International Directory of Cinematographers, Set- and Costume Designers in Film: Hungary (from the beginnings to 1988). Saur, 1981.
