= Ági Donáth =

Hungarian-born American actress (1918–2008)

- Born: 25 March 1918; Budapest, Austria-Hungary
- Died: 16 February 2008 (aged 89); Palm Desert, California, US
- Occupations: Actress; businesswoman; real estate broker; socialite
- Spouse: Emeric Pressburger (m. 1938–1941)

Ági Donáth (25 March 1918 – 16 February 2008) was a Hungarian-born American child actress, who appeared in a dozen or so films during the 1930s, most notably, Sister Maria (1937).

She was born on 25 March 1918 in Budapest, Austria-Hungary. On 24 June 1938 she married producer Emeric Pressburger. The union lasted until 1941. After the divorce, she emigrated to the United States. She remarried and became a successful businesswoman and real estate broker in Bel Air, Los Angeles and a socialite.

== Selected filmography ==
- Hotel Springtime (1937)
- Sister Maria (1937)
- Tokay Rhapsody (1937)
- There Are Exceptions (1937)
- Tales of Budapest (1937)
- Modern Girls (1937)
- I Defended a Woman (1938)

== Death ==
She died on 16 February 2008, aged 89, in Palm Desert, California.
