= Sári Déry =

Hungarian actress (1911–1952)

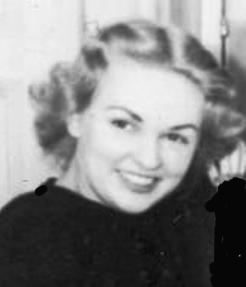
- Déry in 1940
- Born: 2 September 1911; Pozsony, Austro-Hungarian Empire
- Died: 26 August 1952 (aged 40); Sátoraljaújhely, Hungary
- Occupation: Actress
- Years active: 1939–1944 (film)

Sári Déry (2 September 1911 – 26 August 1952) was a Hungarian stage and film actress. She was married three times, including to the actor Nándor Bihary. She was born in Bratislava, then part of the Austro-Hungarian Empire but later part of Czechoslovakia. After first appearing on stage in Bratislava, she emigrated to Budapest where she appeared at a variety of theatres. In the early 1950s she was persecuted by the Communist regime and had to leave Budapest, something loosely portrayed in the 1984 film Oh, Bloody Life. She died of appendicitis in 1952 in rural Hungary.

== Selected filmography ==
- Hello, Peter! (1939)
- Money Is Coming (1939)
- Wild Rose (1939)
- Everybody Loves Someone Else (1940)
- Sirius (1942)
- The Song of Rákóczi (1943)
- It Begins with Marriage (1943)
- The Night Serenade (1943)
- Wedding March (1944)

== Bibliography ==
- Gudenus, János József. A magyarországi főnemesség XX. századi genealógiája: köt. A-J. Heraldika Kiadó, 1990.
- Széchényi. Kinga. Klassenfeinde: Die Geschichte der Deportationen in Ungarn während der kommunistischen Schreckensherrschaft. Tredition, 2022.
- Székely, György & Gajdó, Tamás. Magyar színháztörténet: 1920-1949. Akadémiai Kiadó, 1990.
