= Tino Pattiera =

Croatian tenor

- Born: 27 June 1890; Cavtat, Kingdom of Dalmatia, Austria-Hungary
- Died: 24 April 1966 (aged 75); Cavtat, SR Croatia, SFR Yugoslavia
- Occupation: Opera singer (tenor)

Tino Pattiera (27 June 1890 – 24 April 1966) was a Dalmatian Italian Croatian tenor, born in Cavtat, near Dubrovnik.

Prior to taking up the repertory for which he became famous, he was notable in operetta.

Pattiera was suited for roles such as Manrico in Il trovatore. It was in this role that he made his stage debut at the Dresden Opera in 1914 and it was in the Italian repertoire that he specialized. Among his closest friends and colleagues during the early days at Dresden were Richard Tauber and Elisabeth Rethberg.

Pattiera was the most popular tenor in Dresden in the 1920s. It was during that time he partnered with the soprano Meta Seinemeyer and was responsible for a resurgence of interest in Giuseppe Verdi's operas in Germany. Singing with Seinemeyer under Fritz Busch, they gave performances of La forza del destino and Don Carlos in notable productions.

In addition to his work in Dresden in the Italian repertoire, Pattiera sang Tannhäuser and the role of Bacchus in Ariadne auf Naxos, was a guest artist in several European cities, and joined the Chicago Opera Company for the 1920/21 season.

On 31 January 1925, the Dresden premiere of Umberto Giordano's Andrea Chénier was given with Seinemeyer as Maddalena. It won praise from the composer himself, who was in the audience. Tino Pattiera, who became her most famous stage and recording partner, sang the title role.

On occasion compared with Caruso during his partnership with Seinemeyer, Steane notes "that Dresdeners are said to have compared their performances together to the Melba-Caruso evenings at Covent Garden.

Pattiera gave his last performance in 1953 in Dresden and then retired, after which he taught in Vienna. He died in 1966 and is buried in his hometown of Cavtat.

== Filmography ==
- Fra Diavolo (March 1931 in German; April 1931 in French; both versions directed by Mario Bonnard)
- Eine Nacht in Venedig (March 1934 in German; directed by Robert Wiene) (A Night in Venice for USA release)
- Egy éj Velencében (1935) Directed by Géza von Cziffra. (A Night in Venice for English language release)
