= It Begins with Marriage =

1943 film

- Directed by: Viktor Bánky
- Written by: Johann von Vásáry
- Produced by: Ernö Gottesmann
- Starring: Lili Muráti; Miklós Hajmássy; Gábor Rajnay
- Cinematography: Barnabás Hegyi
- Edited by: László Katonka
- Music by: Béla Malcsiner
- Production company: Magyar Film Iroda
- Release date: 21 March 1943
- Running time: 81 minutes
- Country: Hungary
- Language: Hungarian

It Begins with Marriage (Hungarian: Házassággal kezdödik) is 1943 Hungarian comedy film directed by Viktor Bánky and starring Lili Muráti, Miklós Hajmássy and Gábor Rajnay. It was shot at the Hunnia Studios in Budapest. The film's sets were designed by the art director István Básthy.

== Synopsis ==
To the relief of her father the spoiled Lili is being taken off his hands by her new husband Peter. However the two soon quarrel and she goes on the honeymoon with her former suitor Alfred. To her irritation Peter does not immediately follow after them.

== Cast ==
- Lili Muráti as Lili
- Miklós Hajmássy as Péter
- Gábor Rajnay as Gáspár, Lili apja
- Tivadar Bilicsi as Alfred
- Sári Déry as Vilma, a színésznõ
- Samu Balázs as Az orvos
- Lajos Alszeghy as pincér Fehérváron
- Elek Bognár as Orvos
- Juliska Dinnyési as ápolónõ
- István Falussy as Pap
- Dóra Fáy Kiss as ápolónõ
- Gusztáv Harasztos as Rokon
- Gyula Ignáth as Segédorvos
- Lajos Kelemen as Sofõr
- Antal Lédeczi as Börtönõ
- Tibor Magyari as telefonos férfi a Grillben

== Bibliography ==
- Juhász, István. Kincses magyar filmtár 1931-1944: az eredeti forgatókönyvből 1931 és 1944 között létrejött hazai mozgóképekről. Kráter, 2007.
- Rîpeanu, Bujor. (ed.) International Directory of Cinematographers, Set- and Costume Designers in Film: Hungary (from the beginnings to 1988). Saur, 1981.
