= Blanka Szombathelyi =

Hungarian actress (1918–1999)

- Born: 21 June 1918; Nagyvárad, Austria-Hungary (now Oradea, Romania)
- Died: 22 May 1999 (aged 80); Los Angeles, California, U.S.
- Occupation: Actress
- Years active: 1930–1939 (film)

Blanka Szombathelyi (21 June 1918 – 22 May 1999) was a Hungarian stage and film actress. She was born in Transylvania in Austria-Hungary in territory that was subsequently part of Romania. During the 1930s she played ingénues in a number of Hungarian films, generally comedies. Following the end of the Second World War she emigrated from Hungary with her husband the athlete Ferenc Orbán setting first in Switzerland and then in Los Angeles.

== Selected filmography ==
- Emmy (1934)
- Romance of Ida (1934)
- Tokay Rhapsody (1937)
- The Mysterious Stranger (1937)
- The Witch of Leányvár (1938)
- Döntö pillanat (1938)
- No Coincidence (1939)

== Bibliography ==
- Szy, Tibor . Hungarians in America: A Biographical Directory of Professionals of Hungarian Origin in the Americas. Hungarian University Association, 1963.
- Borbándi, Gyula . A magyar emigráció életrajza: 1945–1985, Volume 2. Európa Kiadó, 1985.
