= At the End of September =

1942 film

- Directed by: Kálmán Zsabka
- Written by: Géza Palásthy; László Sipos
- Produced by: Kálmán Zsabka
- Starring: Éva Szörényi; László Horváth; Margit Ladomerszky
- Cinematography: Rudolf Icsey
- Edited by: Péter Pokol
- Music by: Lajos Ákom
- Production company: Modern Film
- Release date: 1942
- Running time: 87 minutes
- Country: Hungary
- Language: Hungarian

At the End of September (Hungarian: Szeptember végén) is a 1942 Hungarian historical drama film directed by Kálmán Zsabka and starring Éva Szörényi, László Horváth and Margit Ladomerszky. It was shot at the Hunnia Studios in Budapest. The film's sets were designed by the art director János Pagonyi. It is inspired by the life of Sándor Petőfi, Hungary's national poet.

== Cast ==
- Éva Szörényi as Szendrey Júlia
- László Horváth as Petõfi Zoltán / Petõfi Sándor
- Dorita Boneva as Anikó - cigánylány
- Ibolya Bilinszky as Primadonna
- Margit Ladomerszky as Laborfalvy Róza
- Ildikó Zilahy as Krisztina
- Lucy Cziráky as Vándorszínésznö
- Terka Császár as Szállásadónõ
- Ferenc Delly as Bonvíván
- Zoltán Makláry as Súgó
- Béla Fáy as Horváth Árpád
- Ilus Vay as Zoltán kedvese
- Lajos Kelemen as Kocsmai vendég
- Miklós Pataki as gróf Teleki Sándor
- Gyözö Kabók as Vendég a kocsmában
- Gyula Szabó as Direktor
- Elek Bognár as Jókai
- Nándor Bihary as Szerkesztõ

== Bibliography ==
- Ostrowska, Dorota, Pitassio, Francesco & Varga, Zsuzsanna. Popular Cinemas in East Central Europe: Film Cultures and Histories. Bloomsbury Publishing, 2017
- Juhász, István. Kincses magyar filmtár 1931-1944: az eredeti forgatókönyvből 1931 és 1944 között létrejött hazai mozgóképekről. Kráter, 2007.
- Rîpeanu, Bujor. (ed.) International Directory of Cinematographers, Set- and Costume Designers in Film: Hungary (from the beginnings to 1988). Saur, 1981.
