= Old Waltz =

1941 film

- Directed by: Viktor Bánky
- Written by: Pál Barabás
- Produced by: Árpád Tasnády
- Starring: Éva Szörényi; Antal Páger; László Szilassy
- Cinematography: Rudolf Icsey
- Edited by: Viktor Bánky
- Music by: Béla Dolecskó
- Production companies: Hunnia Filmgyár; Jupiter Film
- Release date: 22 December 1941
- Running time: 100 minutes
- Country: Hungary
- Language: Hungarian

Old Waltz (Hungarian: Régi keringő) is a 1941 Hungarian comedy film directed by Viktor Bánky and starring Éva Szörényi, Antal Páger and László Szilassy. It was shot at the Hunnia Studios in Budapest. The film's sets were designed by the art director Imre Sőrés.

== Cast ==
- Éva Szörényi as Tavasz Erzsi, primadonna
- Antal Páger as Dudva Mihály, taxisofõr
- Margit Zsilley as Gál Dorothy
- Margit Lánczy as Almády Júlia grófnõ
- Ilona Kökényas Hajnal Ilka, öltöztetõnõ
- László Szilassy as Almády László gróf
- László Földényi as Bakonyi Péter, ex-bonviván
- Tivadar Bilicsi as Almády gróf inasa
- Margit Vágóné as Dudva édesanyja
- Zsuzsa Gögh as Kati, szobalány
- Livia Miklós as Színésznõ
- Lajos Sugár as Gál Fülöp, milliomos
- József Juhász as Gróf Döme
- Lajos Gárday as Bakonyi inasa
- Béla Vizi as Radványi, színész
- Nándor Bihary as Ödön, pincér a Hungáriában, Dudva Mihály sógora
- Gyula Szöreghy as Rendezõ
- György Gonda as Taxisofõr
- István Lontay as pincér a Hungáriában

== Bibliography ==
- Cunningham, John. Hungarian Cinema: From Coffee House to Multiplex. Wallflower Press, 2004.
- Juhász, István. Kincses magyar filmtár 1931-1944: az eredeti forgatókönyvből 1931 és 1944 között létrejött hazai mozgóképekről. Kráter, 2007.
- Rîpeanu, Bujor. (ed.) International Directory of Cinematographers, Set- and Costume Designers in Film: Hungary (from the beginnings to 1988). Saur, 1981.
