= Samu Balázs =

Hungarian actor (1906–1981)

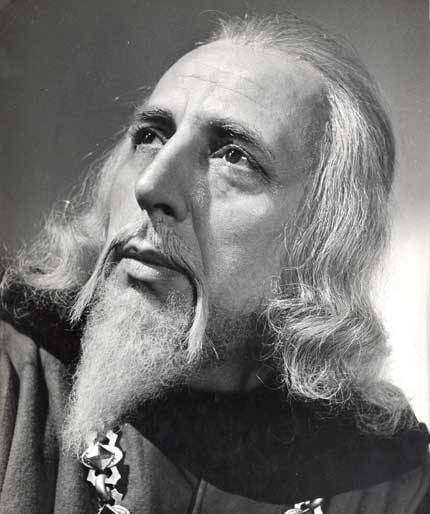
- Born: 18 May 1906; Bánffyhunyad, Austria-Hungary
- Died: 25 September 1981 (aged 75); Budapest, Hungary

Samu Balázs (1906–1981) was a Hungarian actor.

== Selected filmography ==
- The Marsh Flower (1943)
- I Dreamed of You (1943)
- It Begins with Marriage (1943)
- The Song of Rákóczi (1943)
- Devil Rider (1944)
- Singing Makes Life Beautiful (1950)
- Liliomfi (1954)
- Me and My Grandfather (1954)
- Keep Your Chin Up (1954)
- Tale on the Twelve Points (1957)
- Sunday Romance (1957)
- Háry János (1965)
- Stars of Eger (1968)
- Cats' Play (1972)
- Csontváry (1980)
