= Lóránd Fráter (film) =

1942 film

- Directed by: László Kalmár
- Written by: Miklós Asztalos; László Pacsery
- Produced by: Miklós Szalontai Kiss
- Starring: Antal Páger; László Szilassy; Bea Goll
- Cinematography: Rudolf Icsey
- Edited by: Zoltán Kerényi
- Music by: Lóránd Fráter; Jenö Sándor
- Production company: Mester Film
- Release date: 6 May 1942
- Running time: 105 minutes
- Country: Hungary
- Language: Hungarian

Lóránd Fráter (Hungarian: Fráter Loránd) is a 1942 Hungarian musical comedy film directed by László Kalmár and starring Antal Páger, László Szilassy and Bea Goll. It was shot at the Hunnia Studios in Budapest. The film's sets were designed by the art director József Simoncsics.

== Synopsis ==
A young actor is playing the role of the famous composer Lóránd Fráter in a theatre production. This impresses Pannika, but her mother who knew the real composer and was courted by her years before, considers him to be a fraud. The actor tries to pretend that he is really the son of the composer, who is then drawn into his efforts to woo Pannika.

== Cast ==
- Antal Páger as A nótalelkü Fráter lóránd
- László Szilassy as Sárossy Laci, ál Fráter lóránd
- Bea Goll as Pannika, Bálint lánya
- Anna Tõkés as Zsuzsi, Bálint felesége
- Gerö Mály as Felleghy Tihamér, a ripacs színiigazgató
- Ilona Kökény as Felleghyné
- Zoltán Makláry as Tóni a békebeli 'fõúr'
- Nusi Somogyi as Tercsi
- Gyula Szöreghy as a Fráter Lóránd asztaltársaság tagja
- Ila Nagy as Színésznõ
- Emmi Nagy as Színésznõ
- Andor Ajtay as Bálint, fõszolgabíró
- Sári Károlyi as Színésznõ
- Sándor Tompa as Színész
- Béla Venczel as Színész
- László Misoga as Színész
- Gyula Szabó as Színész
- György Gonda as Inas
- Mária Keresztessy as Színésznõ

== Bibliography ==
- Juhász, István. Kincses magyar filmtár 1931–1944: az eredeti forgatókönyvből 1931 és 1944 között létrejött hazai mozgóképekről. Kráter, 2007.
- Rîpeanu, Bujor. (ed.) International Directory of Cinematographers, Set- and Costume Designers in Film: Hungary (from the beginnings to 1988). Saur, 1981.
