= Johann von Vásáry =

Hungarian actor, screenwriter, playwright and film director

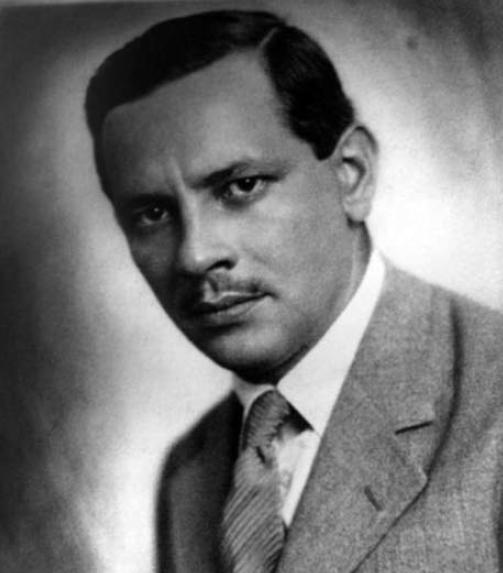
- Born: 11 January 1899; Budapest, Austro-Hungarian Empire
- Died: 20 November 1963 (aged 64); Madrid, Spain
- Other name: Vaszary János
- Occupations: Director; writer
- Years active: 1923–1957 (film)
- Spouse(s): Janka Siklossy (1929–1938); Lili Muráti (1941–1963)

Johann von Vásáry or János Vaszary (1899–1963) was a Hungarian actor, screenwriter, playwright and film director. Several of his plays were adapted into films including I Entrust My Wife to You in 1943. He was married to the actress Lili Muráti, and the two went into exile in Spain following the Second World War.

== Selected filmography ==
- Stars of Eger (1923)
- Peter (1934)
- A Night in Venice (1934)
- Hannerl and Her Lovers (1936)
- Mother (1937)
- Tokay Rhapsody (1937)
- Sweet Revenge (1937)
- Roxy and the Wonderteam (1938)
- The Henpecked Husband (1938)
- Duel for Nothing (1940)
- Yes or No? (1940)
- One Night in Transylvania (1941)
- Love Me (1942)
- The Perfect Family (1942)
- I Married an Angel (1942, based on the Broadway musical I Married an Angel based on his play)
- It Begins with Marriage (1943)
- I Dreamed of You (1943)
- I Entrust My Wife to You (1943, based on his play)
- Ich hab' von dir geträumt (1944, based on his story)
- Tell the Truth (1946, based on his play)

== Bibliography ==
- Eric Rentschler. German Film & Literature. Routledge, 2013.
