= Temptation (1942 film) =

1942 film

- Directed by: Zoltán Farkas
- Written by: Adorján Bónyi; Jenõ Szatmári
- Starring: Elma Bulla; Katalin Karády; István Nagy; Tibor Halmay
- Cinematography: István Eiben
- Music by: Szabolcs Fényes
- Production company: Hunnia Filmgyár
- Distributed by: Takács Film
- Release date: 14 January 1942
- Running time: 93 minutes
- Country: Hungary
- Language: Hungarian

Temptation (Hungarian: Kísértés) is a 1942 Hungarian crime drama film directed by Zoltán Farkas and starring Elma Bulla, Katalin Karády, István Nagy and Tibor Halmay. It was shot at the Hunnia Studios in Budapest. The film's sets were designed by the art director László Dudás.

== Synopsis ==
After her brother is convicted of a bank robbery, Cecil swears revenge on the judge and sets out to seduce him and then ruin his career. His wife Mária set out to fight for her husband.

== Cast ==
- Elma Bulla as Mária, Kétzy felesége
- István Nagy as Dr.Kétzy Péter, törvényszéki tanácselnök
- Miklós Hajmássy as Cornelius van Dusen
- Tibor Halmay as Dusen titkára
- Katalin Karády as Horváth Cecil
- Olga Bajner as Mária barátnõje
- Lajos Boray as ügyvéd
- Endre C. Turáni as Rudi, Cecil öccse
- György Hajnal as Szállodaportás
- Miklós Pataki as Igazgató
- Tibor Rubinyi as Vendég a szállodában
- Marcsa Simon as Házvezetõnõ
- György Solthy as Vezérigazgató
- Ferenc Szabó as Altiszt

== Bibliography ==
- Frey, David. Jews, Nazis and the Cinema of Hungary: The Tragedy of Success, 1929-1944. Bloomsbury Publishing, 2017.
- Juhász, István. Kincses magyar filmtár 1931-1944: az eredeti forgatókönyvből 1931 és 1944 között létrejött hazai mozgóképekről. Kráter, 2007.
- Rîpeanu, Bujor. (ed.) International Directory of Cinematographers, Set- and Costume Designers in Film: Hungary (from the beginnings to 1988). Saur, 1981.
