= Everybody Loves Someone Else =

1940 film

- Directed by: Béla Balogh
- Written by: Lajos Thury
- Produced by: Géza Matolay; Pál Siklóssy
- Starring: Tivadar Uray; Sári Déry; Zoltán Makláry
- Cinematography: Árpád Makay
- Edited by: Lajos Paál
- Music by: Szabolcs Fényes
- Production company: Magyar Írók Filmje
- Release date: 12 December 1940
- Running time: 93 minutes
- Country: Hungary
- Language: Hungarian

Everybody Loves Someone Else (Hungarian: Mindenki mást szeret) is a 1940 Hungarian romantic drama film directed by Béla Balogh and starring Eszter Szilágyi Szabó, Tivadar Uray, Sári Déry and Zoltán Makláry. It was shot at the Hunnia Studios in Budapest. The film's sets were designed by the art director Klára B. Kokas.

== Cast ==
- Eszter Szilágyi Szabó as Jolán nõvér
- Tivadar Uray as Horváth Gábor orvos
- Sári Déry as Horváthné
- Zoltán Makláry as Varga
- Attila Petheö as Az öreg gróf
- Ferenc Bókay as Feri gróf
- Irén Harczos as Filmszínésznõ
- György Nagyajtay as Filmszínész
- Nusi Somogyi as Jegyzõné
- Marcsa Simon as Mariska néni
- Ferenc Pethes as Segédjegyzõ
- Géza Halász as Monoklis fiatalember
- Gusztáv Harasztos as Amerika filmes
- Katalin Ilosvay as Flóra baráznõje
- Tihamér Lázár as Patikus a kocsmában
- Irma Cserei as Páciens
- Irén Sitkey as Tanítónõ
- Dezsö Szalóky as Pista bácsi, Horváth páciense
- István Szegedi Szabó as Jószágigazgató
- Ferenc Szécsi as Segédrendezõ
- Gyula Szöreghy as Kocsmáros
- György Ungváry as Lacika

== Bibliography ==
- Juhász, István. Kincses magyar filmtár 1931–1944: az eredeti forgatókönyvből 1931 és 1944 között létrejött hazai mozgóképekről. Kráter, 2007.
- Rîpeanu, Bujor. (ed.) International Directory of Cinematographers, Set- and Costume Designers in Film: Hungary (from the beginnings to 1988). Saur, 1981.
