= István Nagy (actor) =

Hungarian actor

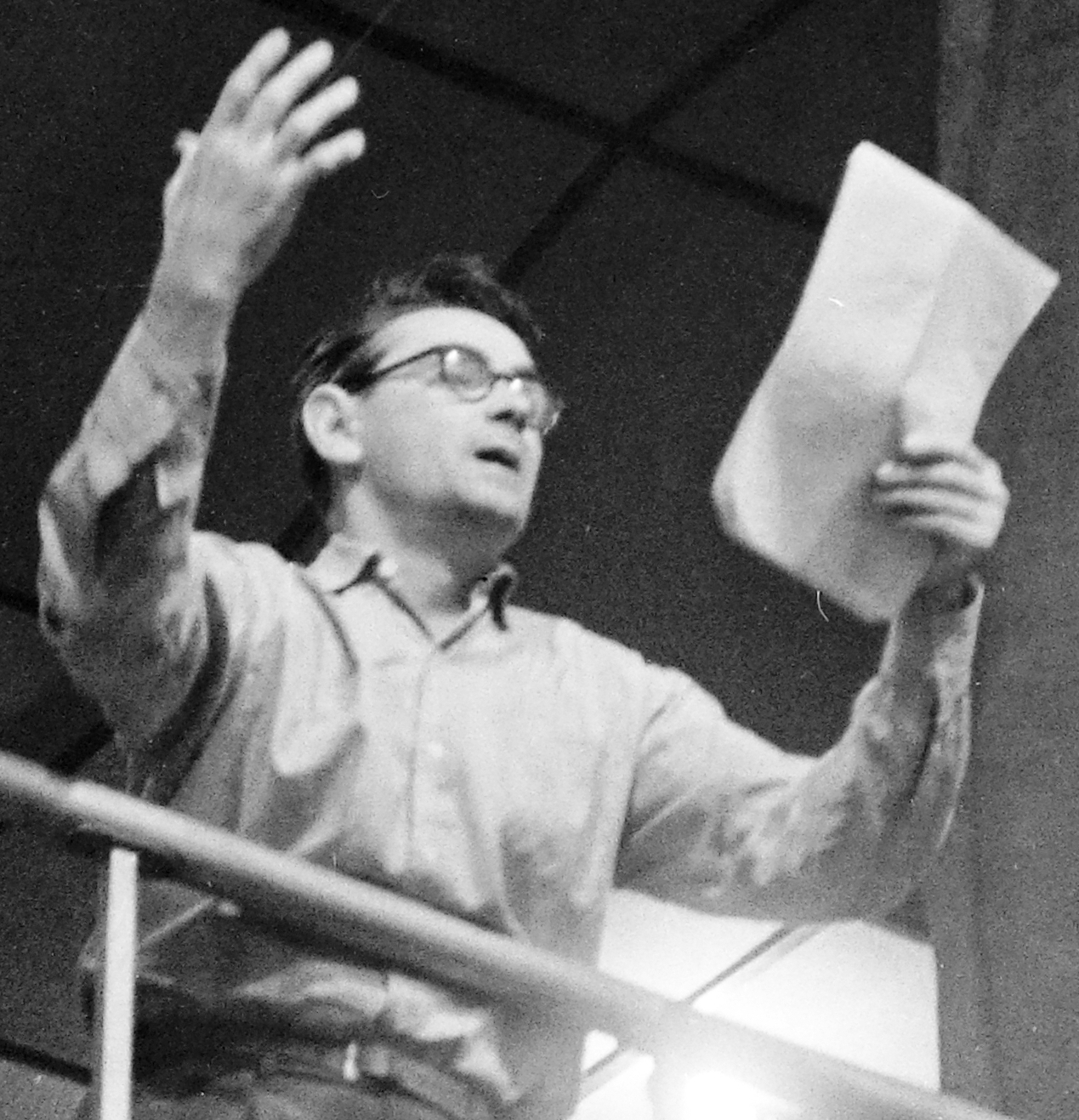
- Nagy in 1963.
- Born: 22 January 1909; Maroslekence, Austro-Hungarian Empire
- Died: 29 January 1976 (aged 67); Budapest, Hungary
- Occupation: Actor
- Years active: 1940–1963 (film)

István Nagy (1909–1976) was a Hungarian stage and film actor. He starred alongside the actress Katalin Karády in several films. He was born in Transylvania which was then part of the Austro-Hungarian Empire, but was subsequently ceded to Romania and went to university and began acting in Cluj. When Hungary annexed Transylvania in 1940 he moved to Budapest and appeared onstage at the National Theatre and elsewhere and in films at the city's Hunnia Studios.

== Selected filmography ==
- One Night in Transylvania (1941)
- Silenced Bells (1941)
- Deadly Kiss (1942)
- A Heart Stops Beating (1942)
- Mountain Girl (1942)
- Temptation (1942)
- Suburban Guard Post (1943)
- Black Dawn (1943)
- Masterless Woman (1944)
- A Quiet Home (1958)
- The Moneymaker (1964)
- Irány Mexikó! (1968)

== Bibliography ==
- Király, Jenő. Karády mítosza és mágiája. Háttér Lap- és Könyvkiadó, 1989.
- Petrucci, Antonio. Twenty Years of Cinema in Venice. International Exhibition of Cinematographic Art, 1952.
