= The Dance of Death (1942 film) =

1942 film

- Directed by: László Kalmár
- Written by: József Babay
- Produced by: Miklós Szalontai Kiss
- Starring: Artúr Somlay; Mária Lázár; Bea Goll
- Cinematography: Árpád Makay
- Edited by: László Katonka
- Music by: Dénes Polgár
- Production company: Hunnia Filmstúdió
- Distributed by: Mester Film
- Release date: 24 February 1942
- Running time: 83 minutes
- Country: Hungary
- Language: Hungarian

The Dance of Death (Hungarian: Haláltánc) is a 1942 Hungarian drama film directed by László Kalmár and starring Artúr Somlay, Mária Lázár and Bea Goll. It was shot at the Hunnia Studios in Budapest. The film's sets were designed by the art director Imre Sőrés.

== Cast ==
- Artúr Somlay as Lovasdy Kálmán
- Mária Lázár as Lovasdyné
- Bea Goll as Marietta, Lovasdy lánya
- Tivadar Uray as Zentay Zoltán, Színész
- László Perényi as Dr. Gordon Péter, orvos
- József Juhász as Házmester
- Imre Toronyi as Rendõrfelügyelõ
- Zoltán Makláry as Színházi szabó, öltöztetõ
- István Lontay as Keresztessy rendõrfogalmazó
- Tivadar Bilicsi
- Géza Berczy
- Lajos Sugár
- Ágnes Almássy
- Ottó Jeney
- Livia Miklós

== Bibliography ==
- Juhász, István. Kincses magyar filmtár 1931–1944: az eredeti forgatókönyvből 1931 és 1944 között létrejött hazai mozgóképekről. Kráter, 2007.
- Rîpeanu, Bujor. (ed.) International Directory of Cinematographers, Set- and Costume Designers in Film: Hungary (from the beginnings to 1988). Saur, 1981.
