= Lajos Sugár =

Hungarian actor

- Born: Lajos Schwartz; 4 May 1893; Budapest, Austria-Hungary
- Died: 17 May 1974 (aged 81); Budapest, Hungary
- Occupation: Actor
- Years active: 1930–1965 (film)

Lajos Sugár (1893–1974) was a Hungarian stage and film actor. He appeared at a variety of Hungarian theatres during his career including the National Theatre in Budapest. He frequently appeared in films in supporting roles during the 1930s and 1940s.

== Selected filmography ==
- The Dream Car (1934)
- The Wise Mother (1935)
- The Golden Man (1936)
- Salary, 200 a Month (1936)
- Tomi (1936)
- 120 Kilometres an Hour (1937)
- Hotel Springtime (1937)
- Young Noszty and Mary Toth (1938)
- The Lady Is a Bit Cracked (1938)
- The Wrong Man (1938)
- Rézi Friday (1939)
- Princess of the Puszta (1939)
- The Ball Is On (1939)
- Money Is Coming (1939)
- The Five-Forty (1939)
- The Perfect Man (1939)
- Much Ado About Emmi (1940)
- The Bercsenyi Hussars (1940)
- Dankó Pista (1940)
- Queen Elizabeth (1940)
- Haunting Spirit (1940)
- Yes or No? (1940)
- Seven Plum Trees (1940)
- Gábor Göre Returns (1940)
- Old Waltz (1941)
- Today, Yesterday and Tomorrow (1941)
- Three Bells (1941)
- Prince Bob (1941)
- Flames (1941)
- A Bowl of Lentils (1941)
- Silenced Bells (1941)
- Beautiful Star (1942)
- Sirius (1942)
- Borrowed Husbands (1942)
- Dr. Kovács István (1942)
- The Dance of Death (1942)
- Katyi (1942)
- The Perfect Family (1942)
- Male Fidelity (1942)
- Siamese Cat (1943)
- The Marsh Flower (1943)
- Disillusion (1943)
- Mouse in the Palace (1943)
- Devil Rider (1944)
- Something in the Water (1944)
- I'll Make You Happy (1944)
- Eva Szovathy (1944)
- African Bride (1944)
- Erkel (1952)
- Crime at Dawn (1960)

== Bibliography ==
- Fekete, Márton. Prominent Hungarians: Home and Abroad. Szepsi Csombor Literary Circle, 1979.
- Székely, György & Gajdó, Tamás. Magyar színháztörténet: 1920-1949. Akadémiai Kiadó, 1990.
