= Today, Yesterday and Tomorrow =

1941 film

- Directed by: Viktor Bánky
- Written by: Viktor Bánky
- Based on: Today, Yesterday and Tomorrow by Sándor Várady Szabó
- Produced by: Antal Güttler
- Starring: Pál Jávor; Artúr Somlay; Piroska Vaszary
- Cinematography: Árpád Makay
- Edited by: Viktor Bánky
- Music by: Béla Dolecskó
- Production company: Palatinus Filmterjesztõ Vállalat
- Distributed by: Palatinus Filmterjesztõ Vállalat
- Release date: 17 March 1941
- Running time: 96 minutes
- Country: Hungary
- Language: Hungarian

Today, Yesterday and Tomorrow (Hungarian: Ma, tegnap, holnap) is a 1941 Hungarian drama film directed by Viktor Bánky and starring Pál Jávor, Artúr Somlay and Piroska Vaszary. It was shot at the Hunnia Studios in Budapest. The film's sets were designed by the art director János Horváth.

== Cast ==
- Eszter Szilágyi Szabó as Dr.Wagner Edit
- Pál Jávor as Bende László gyárigazgató
- Artúr Somlay as Dr. Téry Sándor
- Piroska Vaszary as Gigi
- Irén Sitkey as Viki
- Gerö Mály as Don Antonio - Kropacsek Antal
- József Juhász as Kocsmáros
- Béla Mihályffi as Dr. Marton
- Lajos Sugár as Szállodai portás
- László Misoga as Londiner
- János Görbe as Harmonikás
- Zoltán Makláry as Fuvaros
- György Gonda as Detektív
- Lajos Kelemen as Detektív
- Bella Csermely as Virágáruslány
- Juliska Dinnyési as Anna növér

== Bibliography ==
- Juhász, István. Kincses magyar filmtár 1931–1944: az eredeti forgatókönyvből 1931 és 1944 között létrejött hazai mozgóképekről. Kráter, 2007.
- Rîpeanu, Bujor. (ed.) International Directory of Cinematographers, Set- and Costume Designers in Film: Hungary (from the beginnings to 1988). Saur, 1981.
- Vilmos, Várkonyi. Jávor Pál: és a magyar film aranykora. Zima Szabolcs, 2013
