= Tokay Rhapsody =

1937 film

- Directed by: Johann von Vásáry
- Written by: László Szilágyi; Gábor Vaszary
- Produced by: Gyula Trebitsch
- Starring: Ági Donáth; Blanka Szombathelyi; Árpád Lehotay
- Cinematography: Ferenc Gergelits
- Edited by: József Szilas
- Music by: Imre Hajdú
- Production company: Objektív Film
- Distributed by: Hungaria Pictures
- Release date: 23 December 1937
- Running time: 69 minutes
- Country: Hungary
- Language: Hungarian

Tokay Rhapsody (Hungarian: Tokaji rapszódia) is a 1937 Hungarian comedy film directed by Johann von Vásáry and starring Ági Donáth, Blanka Szombathelyi and Árpád Lehotay. It was shot at Hunnia Studios in Budapest and on location around Lake Balaton. The film's sets were designed by the art director Márton Vincze.

== Cast ==
- Ági Donáth as Demeter Éva
- Blanka Szombathelyi as Rétfalvy Olga
- Árpád Lehotay as Gróf Baracskay Ádám
- Jenö Pataky as Gróf Baracskay Miklós
- Piroska Vaszary as Gróf Baracskay Malvin
- Ilona Dajbukát as Gróf Baracskay Berta
- Géza Boross as Kudacsek Ödön borszakértõ
- Kálmán Rózsahegyi as Rétfalvy Dezsõ
- István Bársony as Csutorás, kocsis
- Zoltán Makláry as Szlepakovics
- Aranka Gazdy as özvegy Demeterné
- Pál Fekete as énekes
- László Keleti as Eladó a borszaküzletben
- Terus Kováts as Fõbérlõ
- Éva Libertiny as Magduska, bálozó lány
- Tibor Rubinyi as Angol vevõ a borszaküzletben
- Valéria Somló as Éva barátnõje
- Dezsö Szalóky as Pincér
- Ferenc Szécsi as Miklós barátja
- Tibor Weygand as Szerelmes fiatalember
- Kálmán Zátony as Vevõ a borszaküzletben
- Tivadar Bilicsi
- Valéria Hidvéghy
- Gusztáv Vándory

== Bibliography ==
- Juhász, István. Kincses magyar filmtár 1931-1944: az eredeti forgatókönyvből 1931 és 1944 között létrejött hazai mozgóképekről. Kráter, 2007.
- Pór, Katalin. De Budapest à Hollywood: le théâtre hongrois à Hollywood, 1930-1943. Presses universitaires de Rennes, 2010.
- Rîpeanu, Bujor. (ed.) International Directory of Cinematographers, Set- and Costume Designers in Film: Hungary (from the beginnings to 1988). Saur, 1981.
