= Young Noszty and Mary Toth =

1938 film

- Directed by: Steve Sekely
- Written by: Zsolt Harsányi
- Based on: Young Noszty and Mary Toth by Kálmán Mikszáth
- Produced by: Ferenc Hegedüs
- Starring: Pál Jávor; Éva Szörényi; Erika von Thellmann
- Cinematography: István Eiben
- Edited by: Viktor Bánky
- Music by: Szabolcs Fényes
- Production companies: Eco Films; Hunnia Filmgyár; Pictura Film Production
- Release date: 20 January 1938
- Running time: 85 minutes
- Countries: Hungary; Germany
- Language: Hungarian

Young Noszty and Mary Toth (Hungarian: A Noszty fiú esete Tóth Marival) is a 1938 Hungarian-German romantic comedy film directed by Steve Sekely and starring Pál Jávor, Éva Szörényi and Erika von Thellmann. It is based on the 1909 novel of the same title by Kálmán Mikszáth. It was shot at the Hunnia Studios in Budapest. The film's sets were designed by the art director Márton Vincze. It was screened at the Venice Film Festival that year. A separate German-language version Ihr Leibhusar was also produced. The novel was later remade into a 1960 film Young Noszty and Mary Toth.

== Cast ==
- Pál Jávor as Noszty Ferenc
- Éva Szörényi as Tóth Mari
- Erika von Thellmann as Tóthné
- Gábor Rajnay as Noszty Pál
- Gyula Gózon as Bubenyik
- Tibor Halmay as Fõhadnagy
- Tivadar Bilicsi as Kopereczky báró
- Attila Petheö as Ezredes
- Lajos Köpeczi Boócz as Tóth Mihály
- Zoltán Makláry as Kozsehuba
- Manyi Kiss as Kati
- László Keleti as Jani, pincér
- Sándor Pethes as Hadnagy
- Ferenc Pethes as Inas
- Júlia Komár as Rozika
- Terus Kováts as Rozika anyja
- Erzsi Simor as Noszty Vilma
- Andor Heltai as Cigányprímás
- Ferenc Pázmán as Rozika apja
- János Balassa as Cigányzenész
- József Barna as Parasztember a szüreti bálon
- Terka Császár as Integetõ asszony
- István Falussy as Paraszt a szüreti bálon
- Béla Fáy as Katona
- Lajos Kelemen as Kapus a laktanyában
- Lajos Sugár as Hadnagy

== Bibliography ==
- Goble, Alan. The Complete Index to Literary Sources in Film. Walter de Gruyter, 1999.
- Klaus, Ulrich J. Deutsche Tonfilme: Jahrgang 1938. Klaus-Archiv, 1988.
- Juhász, István. Kincses magyar filmtár 1931-1944: az eredeti forgatókönyvből 1931 és 1944 között létrejött hazai mozgóképekről. Kráter, 2007.
- Rîpeanu, Bujor. (ed.) International Directory of Cinematographers, Set- and Costume Designers in Film: Hungary (from the beginnings to 1988). Saur, 1981.
- Vilmos, Várkonyi. Jávor Pál: és a magyar film aranykora. Zima Szabolcs, 2013
