= Money Talks (1940 film) =

1940 film

- Directed by: Jenő Csepreghy
- Written by: Béla Csepreghy
- Produced by: Béla Csepreghy
- Starring: Margit Dajka; Éva Szörényi; Gyula Csortos
- Cinematography: Rudolf Icsey
- Edited by: László Katonka
- Music by: Béla Dolecskó
- Production companies: Csepreghy Film; Hunnia Filmgyár
- Release date: 14 March 1940
- Running time: 91 minutes
- Country: Hungary
- Language: Hungarian

Money Talks (Hungarian: Pénz beszél) is a 1940 Hungarian comedy film directed by Jenő Csepreghy and starring Margit Dajka, Éva Szörényi and Gyula Csortos. It was shot at the Hunnia Studios in Budapest. The film's sets were designed by the art director István Básthy.

== Synopsis ==
The wealthy Ottó Dárday falls out with his relatives and, to spite them, marries the much younger servant Julcsa. When he dies he leaves her all his money, but his nephew sets out to try and swindle her to get his rightful inheritance.

== Cast ==
- Margit Dajka as Julcsa
- Éva Szörényi as Kovács Vera
- Gyula Csortos as Dárday Ottó
- Gerö Mály as Grobusek Alajos
- Sándor Szabó as Dárday István
- Károly Kovács as Andó Elemér
- Margit Ladomerszky as Kovácsné
- Piri Peéry as Paula néni
- György Kürthy as Bernát
- Nándor Bihary as Károly, Dárday rokona
- István Primus as Lajcsi, borbélyinas
- Emmi Nagy as Mici, bárhölgy
- Józsa Verböczy as Dárday rokona
- Éva Libertiny as Bárénekesnõ
- Rózsi Szerdahelyi as Bárhölgy
- Gusztáv Harasztos as Orvos
- Géza Berczy as Zenész a bárban
- János Balassa as Zenész a bárban
- Lajos Kozma as Pincér

== Bibliography ==
- Cunningham, John. Hungarian Cinema: From Coffee House to Multiplex. Wallflower Press, 2004.
- Juhász, István. Kincses magyar filmtár 1931-1944: az eredeti forgatókönyvből 1931 és 1944 között létrejött hazai mozgóképekről. Kráter, 2007.
- Rîpeanu, Bujor. (ed.) International Directory of Cinematographers, Set- and Costume Designers in Film: Hungary (from the beginnings to 1988). Saur, 1981.
