= Árpád Makay =

Hungarian cinematographer (1911–2004)

- Born: 28 May 1911; Radnót, Austria-Hungary
- Died: 6 December 2004 (aged 93); Budapest, Hungary

Árpád Makay (1911–2004) was a Hungarian cinematographer.

== Selected filmography ==
- Deadly Spring (1939)
- Six Weeks of Happiness (1939)
- Rózsafabot (1940)
- Everybody Loves Someone Else (1940)
- Unknown Opponent (1940)
- Gül Baba (1940)
- Don't Ask Who I Was (1941)
- Today, Yesterday and Tomorrow (1941)
- The Gyurkovics Boys (1941)
- Háry János (1941)
- I Am Guilty (1942)
- Magdolna (1942)
- The Dance of Death (1942)
- A Heart Stops Beating (1942)
- Cadet Love (1942)
- Kádár Versus Kerekes (1942)
- Mountain Girl (1942)
- Borrowed Husbands (1942)
- A Woman Looks Back (1942)
- I Dreamed of You (1943)
- Black Dawn (1943)
- Suburban Guard Post (1943)
- Something in the Water (1944)
- Loving Hearts (1944)
- Knock on the Window (1944)
- The Three Doves (1944)
- Masterless Woman (1944)
- Half a Boy (1944)
- Song of the Cornfields (1947)
- Prophet of the Fields (1947)
- Treasured Earth (1948)

== Bibliography ==
- Burns, Bryan. World Cinema: Hungary. Fairleigh Dickinson University Press, 1996.
