= Pál Barabás =

Hungarian writer

- Born: 1 September 1902; Budapest, Austro-Hungarian Empire
- Died: 1945 (aged 42–43); Soviet Union
- Occupation: Writer
- Years active: 1939–1944 (film)

Pál Barabás (1902–1945) was a Hungarian playwright and screenwriter. As well as working as a scriptwriter in the Hungarian film industry, several of his works were adapted for the screen by others.

== Selected filmography ==
- Woman at the Wheel (1939)
- The Ball Is On (1939)
- On the Way Home (1940)
- Let's Love Each Other (1941)
- Old Waltz (1941)
- We'll Know By Midnight (1942)
- Disillusion (1943)
- The White Train (1943)
- Happy Times (1943)
- The Night Girl (1943)
- Strange Roads (1944)
- Masterless Woman (1944)

== Bibliography ==
- Gänzl, Kurt. The Encyclopedia of the Musical Theatre, Volume 2. Schirmer Books, 2001.
