= I Married an Angel =

1938 musical comedy by Rodgers and Hart

- Original 1938 poster
- Music: Richard Rodgers
- Lyrics: Lorenz Hart
- Basis: Angyalt Vettem Felesegul, a Hungarian play by János Vaszary
- Productions: 1938 Broadway; 1942 Film version

I Married an Angel is a 1938 musical comedy by Rodgers and Hart. It was adapted from a play by Hungarian playwright János Vaszary, entitled Angyalt Vettem Felesegul. The book was by Richard Rodgers and Lorenz Hart, with music by Rodgers and lyrics by Hart. The story concerns a wealthy banker who, disillusioned with women, decides that the only mate for him would be an angel. An angel soon arrives, and he marries her, but finds out that her perfection and guilelessness are inconvenient.

== Plot ==
A wealthy Budapest banker, Count Willie Palaffi, is love-weary. He ends his engagement to Anna Murphy, swearing that the only girl he could marry would be an angel. A real angel soon flies into his life, and he marries her. It turns out, however, that she is free of the human failings that permit people to tolerate each other. In particular, she is unable to fib. Her honesty alienates Willie's high society acquaintances and his biggest customer and causes a run on his bank. His sister, Countess Palaffi, saves the day by teaching the angel about the real world. She also bribes taxi drivers to make Willie's creditors late, so that he has time to save his bank. Willie and his now Earthier angel live happily ever after.

== Productions ==
I Married an Angel opened at the Shubert Theatre on May 11, 1938 and closed on February 25, 1939 after 338 performances, followed by an extensive tour. It was directed by newcomer Joshua Logan, with choreography by George Balanchine, scenic design by Jo Mielziner, and costume design by John Hambleton. The cast included Dennis King as Willi, Vera Zorina as Angel, Vivienne Segal as Peggy, Walter Slezak as Harry, Charles Walters as Peter and Audrey Christie as Anna.

Two productions were mounted in 1964: one at Valley Forge Music Fair starring Don Ameche, Margaret Whiting and Taina Elg, and a second at the Royal Poinciana Plaza Playhouse starring Elaine Stritch, Clifford David and Taina Elg. In 1977, the musical was produced at the Berskshire Theatre Festival starring Phyllis Newman, Terence Monk and Valerie Mahaffey. New York staged readings were presented by the New Amsterdam Theatre Company (1986) with Phyllis Newman, Kurt Peterson, and Karen Ziemba; and by the Rodgers & Hart Rediscovered concert series (1995) with Jason Graae, Kim Criswell, Victoria Clark and Marin Mazzie. The musical was also presented as a staged reading by San Francisco's 42nd Street Moon theatre company in 1995 and again in 2000 and by Musicals Tonight!, New York City, as a staged concert in 2000. It was staged by New York City Center's "Encores!" in March 2019.

== Film and radio ==
In 1942, MGM made the musical into a musical film starring Jeanette MacDonald and Nelson Eddy, but as was invariably the case with film adaptations of Rodgers & Hart, the story is entirely different, and the songs are mostly not from the play. A 1952 radio production starred Gordon MacRae and Lucille Norman was also produced.

== Songs ==
Act 1

- Waltz (Opening Act I) – Orchestra
- Did You Ever Get Stung? – Count Willy Palarffi, Countess Peggy Palarffi and Peter Mueller
- I Married an Angel – Willy
- The Modiste – Willy, Angel, Modiste, 1st Venduse and 2nd Vendeuse
- Honeymoon Ballet – Angel, Willy, Premiere Danseur and Corps de Ballet
- I'll Tell the Man in the Street – Peggy and Harry Mischka Szigetti
- How to Win Friends and Influence People – Anna Murphy, Peter and Ensemble
- Finale Act I – Willy, Peggy, Angel, Company

Act 2

- Spring Is Here – Willy and Peggy
- Angel Without Wings – Angel, Femme de Chambre, Clarinda, Philomena, Rosalina, Seronella, Arabella and Florabella
- A Twinkle in Your Eye – Peggy
- I'll Tell the Man in the Street (Reprise) – Harry
- At the Roxy Music Hall – Anna
- Roxy's Music Hall (Snow Ballet) – Willy, Angel, Peggy, Anna, and Company
- Finale Act II – Company

Note: The following earlier Rodgers and Hart songs were also included in the score: "Women Are Women", "Men of Milwaukee" and "Othello".
