= I Dreamed of You =

1943 film

- Directed by: Johann von Vásáry
- Written by: Johann von Vásáry
- Produced by: Lajos Güttler
- Starring: Lili Muráti; Tivadar Bilicsi; Ernö Mihályi
- Cinematography: Árpád Makay
- Edited by: Péter Pokol
- Music by: Károly De Fries
- Production company: Palatinus Filmterjesztõ Vállalat
- Release date: 12 October 1943
- Running time: 80 minutes
- Country: Hungary
- Language: Hungarian

I Dreamed of You (Hungarian: Megálmodtalak) is a 1943 Hungarian romantic drama film directed by Johann von Vásáry and starring Lili Muráti, Tivadar Bilicsi and Ernö Mihályi. It was shot at the Hunnia Studios in Budapest. The film's sets were designed by the art director Imre Sörés.

== Cast ==
- Lili Muráti as Bary Mária, énekesnõ
- Tivadar Bilicsi as Péter, a võlegény
- Gertrúd Romváry as Lívia, Péter menyasszonya
- Ernö Mihályi as A menyasszony apja
- Margit Ladomerszky as A menyasszony anyja
- Manyi Kiss as Helén, az énekesnõ barátnõje
- Éva Serényi as Szobalány
- László Pálóczi asViktor
- Nusi Somogyi as Helén anyja
- György Solthy as Helén apja
- Lajos Alszeghy as Riporter
- Samu Balázs as Hálókocsi kalauz
- Nándor Bihary as Esküvõi sofõr
- Endre C. Turáni as Fõpincér
- György Hajnal as Lajos bácsi, inas
- Zoltán Losonczy as Orvos
- Lajos Mezey as Riporter
- Tyra Németh as Pénztáros kisasszony
- Ferenc Szabó as Közönség
- Miklós Szakáts as Hangverseny vállalati titkár
- Márta Szendrey as öltöztetõnõ
- Béla Venczel as Zongorakísérõ

== Bibliography ==
- Juhász, István. Kincses magyar filmtár 1931-1944: az eredeti forgatókönyvből 1931 és 1944 között létrejött hazai mozgóképekről. Kráter, 2007.
- Pór, Katalin. De Budapest à Hollywood: le théâtre hongrois à Hollywood, 1930-1943. Presses universitaires de Rennes, 2010.
- Rîpeanu, Bujor. (ed.) International Directory of Cinematographers, Set- and Costume Designers in Film: Hungary (from the beginnings to 1988). Saur, 1981.
