= Bea Goll =

Hungarian actress (1927–2014)

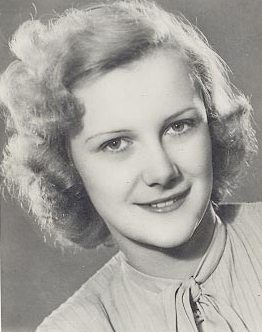
- Goll in 1942
- Born: 10 June 1927; Budapest, Hungary
- Died: 18 November 2014 (aged 87); Zürich, Switzerland
- Occupation: Actress
- Years active: 1941–1944 (film)

Bea Goll (10 June 1927 – 18 November 2014) was a Hungarian stage and film actress. During her brief film career in the 1940s she played several female leads, and was associated with vampish roles despite her youth. Onstage she appeared in revues. She was married to the producer Antal Takács from 1942 to his suicide in 1944. After the end of the Second World War and the establishment of the Communist regime, she emigrated to Switzerland.

== Selected filmography ==
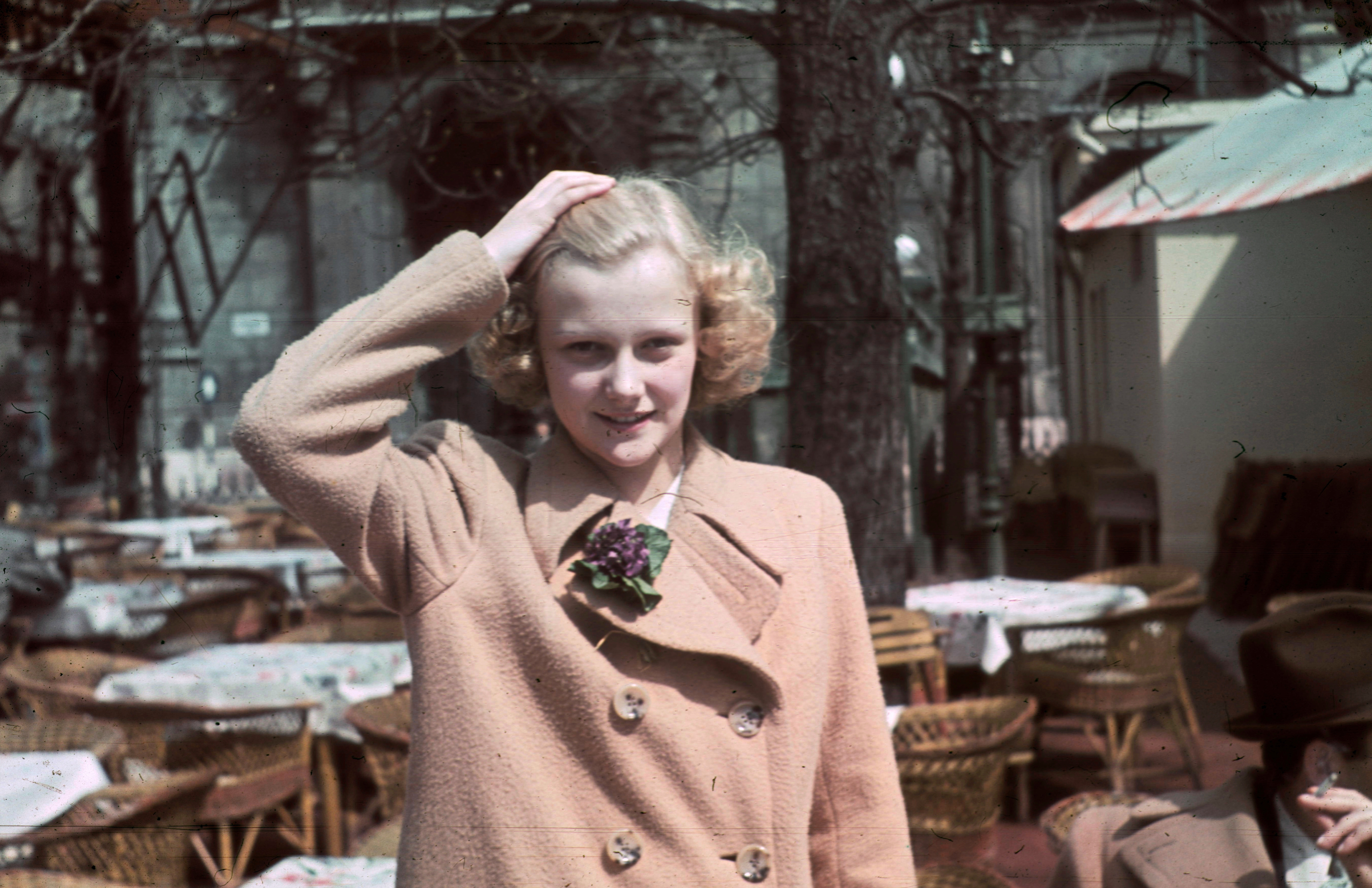
Goll in Budapest, 1943

- Lóránd Fráter (1942)
- The Dance of Death (1942)
- Black Dawn (1943)
- Loving Hearts (1944)

== Bibliography ==
- Cunningham, John. Hungarian Cinema: From Coffee House to Multiplex. Wallflower Press, 2004.
- Enyedi, Sándor. Rivalda nélkül: a határon túli magyar színjátszás kislexikona. Teleki László Alapítvány, 1999.
