= Mária Lázár =

Hungarian actress (1895–1983)

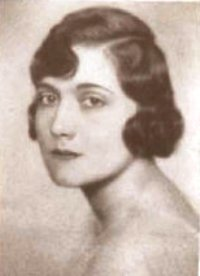
- Lázár, c. 1916
- Born: Mária Czartoriszky; 18 April 1895; Herkulesfürdõ, Austria-Hungary
- Died: 1 October 1983 (aged 88); Budapest, Hungary
- Occupation: Film actress
- Years active: 1920–1977

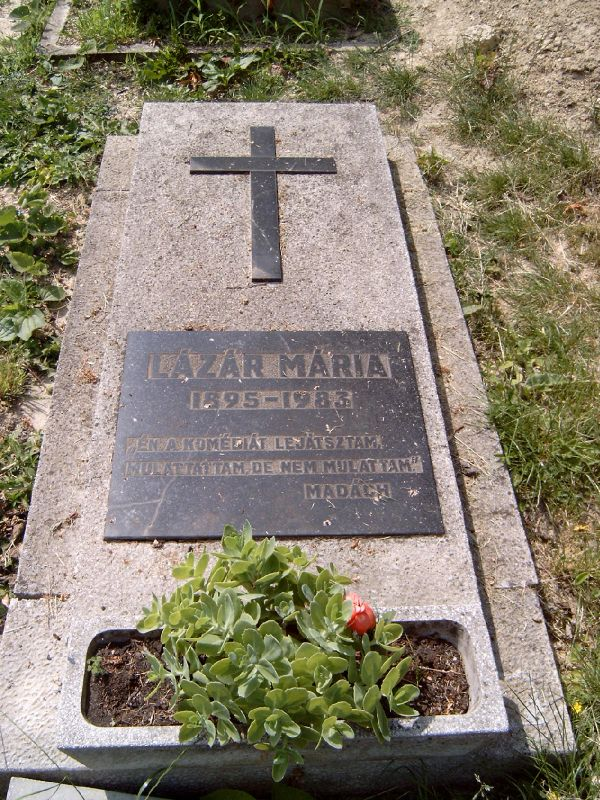
Grave of Mária Lázár at Farkasréti Cemetery in Budapest

Mária Lázár (18 April 1895 – 1 October 1983) was a Hungarian film actress. She was born Mária Czartoriszky in Herkulesfürdõ, Austria-Hungary, and died in Budapest, Hungary. She was married three times: Lajos Ihász (1916–1946), Antal Burger, and András Kiár.

== Selected filmography ==
- A Levágott kéz (1920)
- Haus ohne Tür und ohne Fenster (1922)
- Fehér galambok fekete városban (1923)
- The New Landlord (1935)
- Three Dragons (1936)
- The Man Under the Bridge (1936)
- Beauty of the Pusta (1937)
- All Men Are Crazy (1937)
- I Defended a Woman (1938)
- Stars of Variety (1939)
- Number 111 (1938)
- One Night in Transylvania (1941)
- Magdolna (1942)
- The Dance of Death (1942)
- Gala Suit (1949)
- Springtime in Budapest (1955)
- Sunday Romance (1957)
- Adventure in Gerolstein (1957)
- A Certain Major (1960)
- A Husband for Susy (1960)
- Az orvos halála (1966)
