= The Witch of Leányvár =

1938 film

- Directed by: Viktor Gertler
- Written by: Károly Lovik (novel); Géza Palásthy
- Produced by: Béla Lévay
- Starring: Éva Szörényi; Gyula Csortos; Piri Vaszary
- Cinematography: Rudolf Icsey
- Edited by: Viktor Bánky
- Music by: Lajos Ákom
- Production company: Photophon Film
- Release date: 21 November 1938
- Running time: 76 minutes
- Country: Hungary
- Language: Hungarian

The Witch of Leányvár (Hungarian: A leányvári boszorkány) is a 1938 Hungarian comedy film directed by Viktor Gertler and starring Éva Szörényi, Gyula Csortos and Piri Vaszary. It was shot at the Hunnia Studios in Budapest. The film's sets were designed by the art director József Pán.

== Synopsis ==
In rural Hungary the two daughters of a pawnbroker, with an inflated sense of their social position, refuse a number of invitations to dances from male students at the nearby forestry school.

== Cast ==
- Éva Szörényi as Helén, daughter of Mélius
- Imre Hámory as Cserõczy Béla, student
- Blanka Szombathelyi as Málika, daughter of Mélius
- Gyula Csortos as Mélius Mátyás, pawnbroker
- Imre Apáthi as friend of Cserõczy
- Piroska Vaszary as host
- Márton Rátkai as Dr. Kovács Gyula
- Tivadar Bilicsi as suitor of Helén
- József Bihari as Palkó
- Ilona Dajbukát as cook
- Anni Eisen as costume ball guest
- György Hajnal as Uncle Sanyó, doorman
- Ilona Kökény as guest at the engagement
- János Makláry as lamplighter
- Géza Márky as student
- Ferenc Pethes as Hertelendi
- Sándor Pethes as ringmaster
- Dezsõ Pártos as Böller sacristan, wedding witness
- Vali Rácz as Meluzina
- Dániel Skultéty as bartender
- József Tóth-Vásárhelyi as harmonica-playing student
- Gyula Zordon as student

== Bibliography ==
- Balski, Grzegorz . Directory of Eastern European Film-makers and Films 1945-1991. Flicks Books, 1992.
- Juhász, István. Kincses magyar filmtár 1931-1944: az eredeti forgatókönyvből 1931 és 1944 között létrejött hazai mozgóképekről. Kráter, 2007.
- Rîpeanu, Bujor. (ed.) International Directory of Cinematographers, Set- and Costume Designers in Film: Hungary (from the beginnings to 1988). Saur, 1981.
