= The Mysterious Stranger (1937 film) =

1937 film

- Directed by: Endre Somló
- Written by: Jenõ Gábor (novel); György Kürthy
- Produced by: Endre Soltész
- Starring: Tivadar Uray; Zoltán Várkonyi; Gyula Gózon
- Cinematography: Andor Vidor
- Music by: Sándor László
- Production company: Mozgóképipari
- Release date: 5 May 1937
- Running time: 83 minutes
- Country: Hungary
- Language: Hungarian

The Mysterious Stranger (Hungarian: A titokzatos idegen) is a 1937 Hungarian crime film directed by Endre Somló and starring Tivadar Uray, Zoltán Várkonyi and Gyula Gózon. It was shot at the Hunnia Studios in Budapest. The film's sets were designed by the art director István Szirontai Lhotka.

== Cast ==
- Tivadar Uray as Dr. Tokaden Kornél
- Zoltán Várkonyi as Arácsi mérnök és Arácsi Félix
- Gyula Gózon as Pedellus
- Blanka Szombathelyi as Annus - a pedellus lánya
- Béla Mihályffi as Tanácsos
- György Kürthy as Kázméry vezérigazgató
- Tibor Puskás as Karcsi - Kázméry fia
- Tivadar Bilicsi as Bekecs Lajos - altiszt
- Gida von Lazar as Cserkésztiszt
- Iván Ruttkay as A pedellus fia
- Zsuzsi Polgár as Zsuzsi
- Éva Bornemissza as Kovács kisasszony, Kázméry titkárnõje

== Bibliography ==
- Juhász, István. Kincses magyar filmtár 1931-1944: az eredeti forgatókönyvből 1931 és 1944 között létrejött hazai mozgóképekről. Kráter, 2007.
- Rîpeanu, Bujor. (ed.) International Directory of Cinematographers, Set- and Costume Designers in Film: Hungary (from the beginnings to 1988). Saur, 1981.
