= Masterless Woman =

1944 film

- Directed by: László Sipos
- Written by: Pál Barabás
- Produced by: Klára B. Kokas
- Starring: Erzsi Simor; István Nagy; Ida Turay
- Cinematography: Árpád Makay
- Edited by: Félix Máriássy
- Music by: Szabolcs Fényes
- Production company: Esperia Film
- Release date: 1944
- Running time: 85 minutes
- Country: Hungary
- Language: Hungarian

Masterless Woman (Hungarian: A gazdátlan asszony) is a 1944 Hungarian comedy film directed by László Sipos and starring Erzsi Simor, István Nagy and Ida Turay. It was shot at the Hunnia Studios in Budapest. The film's sets were designed by the art director János Pagonyi. Katalin Karády was originally intended to play the lead before being replaced by Simor.

== Synopsis ==
In a French hotel, Éva attracts the attention of other guests. She is in fact married to Ádám, but feels the loving attention he showed to her during their early courtship has now gone. She indulges in flirtations, but comes to understand the meaning of true love with her absent husband.

== Cast ==
- Erzsi Simor as Éva, Pártos felesége
- István Nagy as Pártos Ádám
- Zoltán Greguss as Kotovszky Iván
- Ida Turay as Konzumnõ
- Ferenc Delly as Szállodaigazgató
- Erzsi Salamon as Alíz, Kotovszky Iván menyasszonya
- Sándor Pethes as Parketttáncos
- György Nagyajtay as Szobapincér
- Mariska Halassy as Éva nagynénje
- László Misoga as Szalay bácsi
- Mária Kúnsági as Juliska, Pártosék szobalánya
- Ferenc Antók as Szállóvendég
- Gusztáv Harasztos as Szállodaportás
- Nusi Somogyi
- Gusztáv Vándory
- Éva Serényi

== Bibliography ==
- Juhász, István. Kincses magyar filmtár 1931–1944: az eredeti forgatókönyvből 1931 és 1944 között létrejött hazai mozgóképekről. Kráter, 2007.
- Rîpeanu, Bujor. (ed.) International Directory of Cinematographers, Set- and Costume Designers in Film: Hungary (from the beginnings to 1988). Saur, 1981.
