= Black Dawn (1943 film) =

1943 film

- Directed by: László Kalmár
- Written by: László Kalmár; László Pacsery
- Produced by: Mária Hausz
- Starring: István Nagy; Bea Goll; Margit Lukács
- Cinematography: Árpád Makay
- Edited by: Zoltán Kerényi
- Music by: Károly De Fries
- Production company: Hausz Mária Filmkölcsönzõ
- Release date: 1 September 1943
- Running time: 88 minutes
- Country: Hungary
- Language: Hungarian

Black Dawn (Hungarian: Fekete hajnal) is a 1943 Hungarian drama film directed by László Kalmár and starring István Nagy, Bea Goll and Margit Lukács. It was shot at the Hunnia Studios in Budapest. The film's sets were designed by the art director Lajos Lévay.

== Synopsis ==
Sculptor László and his new wife are travelling home from their honeymoon when they are involved in a train crash. His wife is killed while László loses his sight. However, another woman Anita tries to help him rebuild his life.

== Cast ==
- István Nagy as Vándor László, szobrászmûvész
- Bea Goll as Veronika, táncosnõ, Vándor felesége
- Margit Lukács as Anita, kalandornõ
- Lili Berky as Vándor anyja
- Ernö Mihályi as Gábor
- Rezsö Harsányi as Vándor apja
- Lajos Vértes as Géza
- Éva Serényi as Vándor húga
- József Barna as Baráti társaság tagja
- Gyula Bartos as Orvosprofesszor
- Jenö Bodnár as Professzor
- Terka Császár as Utas a vonaton
- Jenö Danis as Régi ismerõs
- Éva Erõss as Komorna
- Zsuzsa Gögh a sénekesnõ
- Károly Hajagos as Kertész
- Erzsike Hajdu as Veronika, Vándor László lánya
- Gyula Szabó as Utas a vonaton
- István Lontay as Orvos
- László Misoga as Ügyvéd
- György Solthy as Kezelõorvos

== Bibliography ==
- Juhász, István. Kincses magyar filmtár 1931–1944: az eredeti forgatókönyvből 1931 és 1944 között létrejött hazai mozgóképekről. Kráter, 2007.
- Rîpeanu, Bujor. (ed.) International Directory of Cinematographers, Set- and Costume Designers in Film: Hungary (from the beginnings to 1988). Saur, 1981.
