= I Defended a Woman =

I defended a woman
- Directed by: Ákos Ráthonyi
- Written by: János Bókay
- Starring: Andor Ajtay; Antal Páger; Mária Lázár
- Music by: André Brummer
- Distributed by: Danubia Pictures
- Release date: 28 June 1938
- Running time: 76 minutes
- Country: Hungary
- Language: Hungarian

I defended a woman (Hungarian: Megvédtem egy asszonyt) is a 1938 Hungarian comedy film directed by Ákos Ráthonyi and starring Antal Páger, Mária Lázár and Andor Ajtay. A lawyer acts for a woman in a case, but soon finds himself embroiled in her divorce as a co-respondent.

== Cast ==
- Antal Páger ... Bory Péter, engineer
- Mária Lázár ... Mrs Bakos, Maca, wife
- Béla Mihályffi ... Mr Bakos Kázmér, husband
- Ági Donáth ... Zita, Horváth'a daughter
- Lajos Boray ... Dr.Veress István, lawyer
- Andor Ajtay ... Horváth Dezsõ, hussar officer
- Mariska Vízváry ... Mrs Bory
- László Z. Molnár ... duel assistant
- Márta Fónay ... waitress
- Hilda Gobbi ... witness at jury
