= The Perfect Family (1942 film) =

1942 film

- Directed by: László Sipos
- Written by: Károly Aszlányi; Johann von Vásáry
- Produced by: István Erdélyi
- Starring: Lili Muráti; Piroska Vaszary; Miklós Hajmássy
- Cinematography: Károly Vass
- Edited by: Félix Máriássy
- Music by: Miklós Egyed; Tibor Polgár
- Production company: Atelier Film
- Distributed by: Kárpát Film
- Release date: 1942
- Running time: 74 minutes
- Country: Hungary
- Language: Hungarian

The Perfect Family (Hungarian: A tökéletes család) is a 1942 Hungarian comedy film directed by László Sipos and starring Lili Muráti, Piroska Vaszary and Miklós Hajmássy. It was shot at the Hunnia Studios in Budapest. The film's sets were designed by the art director János Pagonyi.

== Cast ==
- Lili Muráti as Nyulassy Dóra
- Piroska Vaszary as Nyulassyné, Melinda
- Margit Zsilley as Pipi baronessz, Szitai húga
- Miklós Hajmássy as Szabó Boldizsár, könyvügynök
- Gyula Csortos as Nyulassy János gróf
- Ernö Mihályi as Manó gróf, a nagyapa
- Kamill Feleki as Nyulassy Frici
- Ferenc Delly as Szitai Elek báró, Dóra kérõje
- Sándor Pethes as Intézõ
- Zoltán Makláry as Burger Márton
- János Makláry as Inas
- Róbert Bánky as Az Idea Könyvkiadó Vállalat igazgatója
- Gyula Köváry as Fülöp, inas
- Lajos Köpeczi Boócz as Kovács
- Lajos Sugár as Cégvezetõ

== Bibliography ==
- Juhász, István. Kincses magyar filmtár 1931–1944: az eredeti forgatókönyvből 1931 és 1944 között létrejött hazai mozgóképekről. Kráter, 2007.
- Rîpeanu, Bujor. (ed.) International Directory of Cinematographers, Set- and Costume Designers in Film: Hungary (from the beginnings to 1988). Saur, 1981.
