= The Night Serenade =

1943 film

- Directed by: Frigyes Bán
- Written by: Kató Timár; Andor Tiszay
- Produced by: Lóránt Tangl
- Starring: János Sárdy; Margit Ladomerszky; Éva Kelemen
- Cinematography: István Eiben
- Edited by: Zoltán Kerényi
- Music by: Károly De Fries; László Márai
- Production company: Hunnia Filmstúdió
- Release date: 9 November 1943
- Running time: 90 minutes
- Country: Hungary
- Language: Hungarian

The Night Serenade (Hungarian: Éjjeli zene) is a 1943 Hungarian drama film directed by Frigyes Bán and starring János Sárdy, Margit Ladomerszky and Éva Kelemen. It was shot at the Hunnia Studios in Budapest. The film's sets were designed by the art director László Dudás.

== Synopsis ==
A scandal breaks out when an engaged young woman from a wealthy background is serenaded by a man who is not her fiancée.

== Cast ==
- János Sárdy as Tardy Miklós,énekes
- Margit Ladomerszky as Özvegy Tardyné, Miklós anyja
- Tivadar Bilicsi as Pallay, nyug. ezredes
- Éva Kelemen as Pallay Katinka
- Lili Kertay as Az ötödik Pallay lány
- Mariska Halassy as Pallay Irénke
- Ibolya Molnár as Pallay Ezsike
- Lenke Lorán as Pallay Pannika
- Sári Déry as Charlotte
- György Gozmány as Zenge Karcsi, Katinka võlegénye
- Ilus Vay as Nevelõnõ
- Kató Szendrey as Lány a hangversenyen
- László Pálóczi as Baptiste, Tardy inasa
- György Kürthy as Szabadkai úr

== Bibliography ==
- Balski, Grzegorz. Directory of Eastern European Film-makers and Films 1945-1991. Flicks Books, 1992.
- Juhász, István. Kincses magyar filmtár 1931-1944: az eredeti forgatókönyvből 1931 és 1944 között létrejött hazai mozgóképekről. Kráter, 2007.
- Rîpeanu, Bujor. (ed.) International Directory of Cinematographers, Set- and Costume Designers in Film: Hungary (from the beginnings to 1988). Saur, 1981.
