= Nándor Bihary =

Hungarian actor

- Born: 20 March 1900; Gyöngyös, Austro-Hungarian Empire
- Died: 21 March 1948 (aged 48); Budapest, Hungary
- Occupation: Actor
- Years active: 1923–1945 (film)

Nándor Bihary (1900–1948) was a Hungarian stage and film actor. He was active in Hungarian cinema from the silent era until the end of the Second World War, generally playing smaller, supporting roles. He was married to the actress Sári Déry.

== Selected filmography ==
- Stars of Eger (1923)
- The Ball Is On (1939)
- Money Talks (1940)
- Gül Baba (1940)
- Closed Court (1940)
- Matthew Arranges Things (1940)
- Property for Sale (1941)
- Old Waltz (1941)
- The Devil Doesn't Sleep (1941)
- Silenced Bells (1941)
- Katyi (1942)
- Kádár Versus Kerekes (1942)
- At the End of September (1942)
- Changing the Guard (1942)
- The Talking Robe (1942)
- Male Fidelity (1942)
- Disillusion (1943)
- I Dreamed of You (1943)
- Eva Szovathy (1944)
- Muki (1944)
- I'll Make You Happy (1944)
- After the Storm (1945)

== Bibliography ==
- Hames, Peter. The Cinema Of Central Europe. Wallflower Press, 2004.
- Laura, Ernesto G. Tutti i film di Venezia, 1932–1984. La Biennale, Settore cinema e spettacolo televisivo, 1985.
- Székely, György & Gajdó, Tamás. Magyar színháztörténet: 1920-1949. Akadémiai Kiadó, 1990.
