= György Kürthy =

Hungarian actor, scenographer, writer and director of the theater

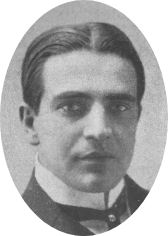
- Kürthy circa 1920
- Born: 24 February 1882; Budapest Austria-Hungary
- Died: 27 December 1972 (aged 90); Budapest Hungary
- Occupations: actor, scenographer, writer director of the theatre
- Spouse: Mariska Vízváry

György Kürthy (24 February 1882 – 27 December 1972) was a Hungarian actor, scenographer, writer and director of the theatre.

== Biography ==
He maturated in Budapest, then moved to Munich where he learnt architecture. His first theatrical performance was in 1905 at Thália Theatre. He was a member of the National Theatre between 1906 and 1935. He worked as a chief director in Kolozsvár (today Cluj-Napoca, Romania) in the theatre year 1908-1909. Between 1916 and 1923 he taught at Academy of Drama and Film in Budapest. During the next year he played at National Theatre of Pécs. Then he moved back to the capital, and was a professor at the Hungarian University of Arts and Design from 1927 to 1930. In the following year he was the director of National Theatre of Szeged. He came back to the stage in 1953 when he played two years at Kisfaludy Károly Theatre and one year at József Attila Theatre.

His work was part of the painting event in the art competition at the 1932 Summer Olympics.

== Family ==
He was the son of Emil Kürthy (1848–1920), a journalist. He was the second husband of Mariska Vízváry (1877–1954), actress, and the father of Péter Kürthy (1926–), actor. He died in Budapest.

== Selected filmography ==
- White Nights (1916)
- Tales of the Typewriter (1916)
- The New Landlord (1935)
- The Mysterious Stranger (1937)
- The Village Rogue (1938)
- Man Sometimes Errs (1938)
- Barbara in America (1938)
- The Perfect Man (1939)
- The Minister's Friend (1939)
- Wild Rose (1939)
- Deadly Spring (1939)
- Princess of the Puszta (1939)
- Money Talks (1940)
- Yes or No? (1940)
- Gül Baba (1940)
- Dankó Pista (1940)
- The Last of the Vereczkeys (1940)
- One Night in Transylvania (1941)
- Flames (1941)
- Silent Monastery (1941)
- People of the Mountains (1942)
- Dr. Kovács István (1942)
- I Am Guilty (1942)
- Beautiful Star (1942)
- Bajtársak (1942)
- Majális (1943)
- The Night Serenade (1943)
- The Marsh Flower (1943)
- The Three Doves (1944)
- I'll Make You Happy (1944)
- Wedding March (1944)
- After the Storm (1945)

== Bibliography ==
- Kulik, Karol. Alexander Korda: The Man Who Could Work Miracles. Virgin Books, 1990.
