= Beauty of the Pusta =

1937 film

Beauty of the Puszta
- Directed by: Steve Sekely
- Written by: Ottó Indig
- Based on: Beauty of the Puszta by Sándor Hunyady
- Produced by: Adolf Fodor; Ernő Gál
- Starring: Mária Lázár; Pál Jávor; Ferenc Kiss
- Cinematography: Károly Kurzmayer
- Music by: Tibor Polgár
- Production companies: Magyar Film Iroda; Phõbus Film
- Release date: 11 November 1937
- Running time: 77 minutes
- Country: Hungary
- Language: Hungarian

Beauty of the Puszta (Hungarian: Pusztai szél) is a 1937 Hungarian historical drama film directed by Steve Sekely and starring Mária Lázár, Pál Jávor and Ferenc Kiss. It is based on a 1931 play of the same title by Sándor Hunyady.

== Synopsis ==
During the 1880s on the Great Hungarian Plain, the innkeeper Anna has long been in a relationship with a bandit outlaw. However she meets and falls in love with a cavalryman battling the outlaws, leading to her former lover seeking revenge on them both.

== Cast ==
- Mária Lázár as Anna, özvegy Török Pálné
- Pál Jávor as Bors István pandúrõrmester
- Ferenc Kiss as Üstödi Antal betyár
- József Juhász as Almássy László
- Gábor Rajnay as Alispán
- Lili Berky as Almássy Tamásné, Kamilla
- Gizi Hertay as Szobalány
- Lajos Köpeczi Boócz as Orvos
- Attila Petheö as Almássy Tamás fõispán
- Margit Vágóné as Máriskó, öreg cseléd
- Kálmán Zátony as Pandúr kapitány
- Zita Szeleczky

== Bibliography ==
- Cunningham, John. Hungarian Cinema: From Coffee House to Multiplex. Wallflower Press, 2004.
- Juhász, István. Kincses magyar filmtár 1931-1944: az eredeti forgatókönyvből 1931 és 1944 között létrejött hazai mozgóképekről. Kráter, 2007.
- Rîpeanu, Bujor. (ed.) International Directory of Cinematographers, Set- and Costume Designers in Film: Hungary (from the beginnings to 1988). Saur, 1981.
