= 120 Kilometres an Hour =

1937 film

- Directed by: László Kardos
- Written by: Mihály Szécsén (novel); Armand Szántó
- Produced by: Elemér Kassay
- Starring: Béla Mihályffi; Lili Muráti; Gyula Kabos
- Cinematography: Andor Vidor
- Edited by: Zoltán Farkas
- Music by: Andor Zerinváry
- Production company: Mozgóképipari
- Release date: 7 October 1937
- Running time: 79 minutes
- Country: Hungary
- Language: Hungarian

120 Kilometres an Hour (Hungarian: 120-as tempó) is a 1937 Hungarian comedy film directed by László Kardos and starring Béla Mihályffi, Lili Muráti and Gyula Kabos. It was shot at the Hunnia Studios in Budapest. It was one of the most successful films at the Hungarian box-office during the decade.

== Cast ==
- Béla Mihályffi as Turner Kornél
- Lili Muráti as Marianne
- Gyula Kabos as Richter Menyhért
- Lajos Básti as Leviczky Tibor
- Mária Mezei as Perlakyné Anna
- Lajos Köpeczi Boócz as Hornik
- Mariska Vízváry as Vilma
- Lajos Sugár as Mihály
- László Z. Molnár as Walter
- György Dénes as Elnöki titkár
- Marcsa Simon as Richter házvezetönöje
- Lajos Gárday as Feri bácsi
- Béla Fáy as Banktisztviselö

== Bibliography ==
- Judson, Pieter and M. Rozenblit, Marsha L. (ed). Constructing Nationalities in East Central Europe. Berghahn Books, 2005.
- Juhász, István. Kincses magyar filmtár 1931-1944: az eredeti forgatókönyvből 1931 és 1944 között létrejött hazai mozgóképekről. Kráter, 2007.
- Rîpeanu, Bujor. (ed.) International Directory of Cinematographers, Set- and Costume Designers in Film: Hungary (from the beginnings to 1988). Saur, 1981.
