= I'll Make You Happy (1944 film) =

1944 film

- Directed by: Viktor Bánky
- Written by: Viktor Bánky; Gábor Vaszary
- Produced by: László Barla
- Starring: Emmi Buttykay; Miklós Hajmássy; Piroska Vaszary
- Cinematography: Lajos Kerti
- Edited by: László Katonka
- Music by: Béla Malcsiner
- Production companies: Mester Film; Magyar Film Iroda
- Release date: 1944
- Running time: 80 minutes
- Country: Hungary
- Language: Hungarian

I'll Make You Happy (Hungarian: Boldoggá teszlek) is a 1944 Hungarian comedy film directed by Viktor Bánky and starring Emmi Buttykay, Miklós Hajmássy and Piroska Vaszary. It was shot at the Hunnia Studios in Budapest. The film's sets were designed by the art directors Sándor Iliszi and Imre Sőrés.

== Cast ==
- Emmi Buttykay as Balázs Judit
- Miklós Hajmássy as Szász Miklós
- Ernö Mihályi as Balázs vezérigazgató, Judit apja
- Piroska Vaszary as Kata néni
- Lajos Sugár as Szalay Gábor vezérigazgató
- György Dénes as Viktor, Szalay fia
- Anna Mária Tahy as Horváth Vera, Miklós menyasszonya
- György Kürthy as Horváth
- Irén Sitkey as Horváthné
- Márta Szendrey as Cseléd
- Éva Szaplonczay as Judit barátnöje
- Katalin Tühegyi as Judit kisasszony
- István Lontay as vendég az eljegyzésen, Judit baráti társaságának tagja
- Ferenc Antók as Balázs Géza titkára
- Antal Lédeczi as Mihály bácsi, irodaszolga
- Nándor Bihary as Bútoros
- István Falussy as Anyakönyvvezetõ
- Károly Hajagos as Textilgyár portása
- Gusztáv Harasztos as Guszti, vendég Balázs Gézánál
- Dániel Skultéty as Miklós munkatársa

== Bibliography ==
- Juhász, István. Kincses magyar filmtár 1931-1944: az eredeti forgatókönyvből 1931 és 1944 között létrejött hazai mozgóképekről. Kráter, 2007.
- Rîpeanu, Bujor. (ed.) International Directory of Cinematographers, Set- and Costume Designers in Film: Hungary (from the beginnings to 1988). Saur, 1981.
