= A Plane Has Not Returned =

1944 film

- Directed by: Ágoston Pacséry
- Written by: András B. Nemes; Ferenc Jablonszky; Miklós Tóth
- Based on: A Plane Has Not Returned by Imre Nyirády Szabó
- Produced by: László Hídvéghy; József Győrffy
- Starring: Margit Lukács; Pál Jávor; Károly Kovács
- Cinematography: Károly Németh
- Edited by: Vera Besztercei
- Music by: István Máté
- Production company: Hidvéghy Film
- Release date: July 1944
- Running time: 82 minutes
- Country: Hungary
- Language: Hungarian

A Plane Has Not Returned (Hungarian: Egy gép nem tért vissza) is a 1944 Hungarian war drama film directed by Ágoston Pacséry and starring Margit Lukács, Pál Jávor and Károly Kovács. It was shot at the Hunnia Studios in Budapest. It is one of comparatively few contemporary Hungarian films directly portraying Hungary's involvement in World War II.

== Synopsis ==
Lieutenant Gábor, Hungarian Air Force pilot drops intelligence officer Benkov behind enemy lines where he makes contact with his lover Marja who has infiltrated the partisans. All proceeds well, but on the new mission the play is shot at and forced to make a landing. Marja shelters them, and all three are willing to sacrifice their lives in order to get the vital information they had uncovered back to their own side.

== Cast ==
- Margit Lukács as Marja
- Pál Jávor as Gábor fõhadnagy
- Károly Kovács as Benkov, hírszerzõ
- József Juhász as Mátyás
- Lajos Vértes as Balthazár
- Pál Vessely as Õrmester
- Andor Sárossy as Szakács
- István Palotai as Szovjet repülõs
- Zoltán Pethö as Százados
- György Gonda as Partizán
- Lajos Kelemen as Partizán
- Ferenc Szabó as Rádiós
- Yulius Zagoni as Ferike

== Bibliography ==
- Juhász, István (2007). Kincses magyar filmtár 1931–1944: az eredeti forgatókönyvből 1931 és 1944 között létrejött hazai mozgóképekről (in Hungarian). Kráter. ISBN 978-963-9735-06-4.
- Rîpeanu, Bujor (1981). Krautz, Alfred; Rîpeanu, Bujor; International Federation Of Film Archives (eds.). International Directory of Cinematographers, Set- and Costume Designers in Film: Hungary (from the beginnings to 1988). K. G. Saur Verlag. doi:10.1515/9783111686738. ISBN 978-3-598-21439-4.
- Várkonyi, Vilmos (2013). Jávor Pál: és a magyar film aranykora. Zima Szabolcs.
