= Princess of the Puszta =

1939 film

- Directed by: Béla Csepreghy
- Written by: Jenõ Hajós
- Starring: Éva Szörényi; Sándor Szabó; Gyula Csortos
- Cinematography: Rudolf Icsey
- Edited by: Zoltán Farkas
- Music by: Miklos Laurisin
- Production company: Atelier Film
- Release date: 19 January 1939
- Running time: 77 minutes
- Country: Hungary
- Language: Hungarian

Princess of the Puszta (Hungarian: Pusztai királykisasszony) is a 1939 Hungarian romantic drama film directed by Béla Csepreghy and starring Éva Szörényi, Sándor Szabó and Gyula Csortos. The film's sets were designed by the art director József Pán. Location shooting took place around Hortobágy.

== Synopsis ==
Foreign students at a Hungarian boarding school enjoy romantic courtships with their Hungarian counterparts.

== Cast ==
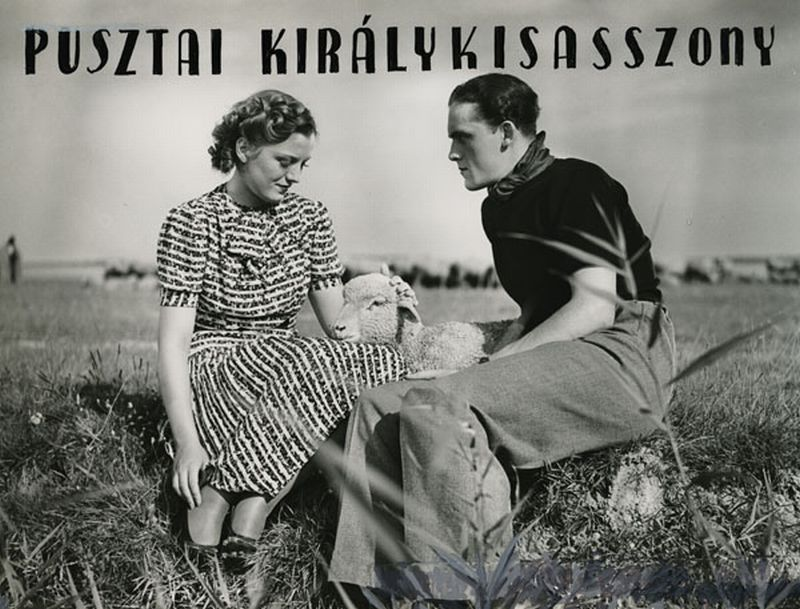

- Éva Szörényi as Balajthay Erzsike
- Sándor Szabó as John MacPercy
- Gyula Csortos as Balajthay Gábor
- Karola Zala as Rosenburgi anyakirálynõ
- Miklós Hajmássy as Jeromos herceg, régens
- György Kürthy as Udvarmester Rosenburgban
- Lajos Boray as Udvari titkár
- Tivadar Bilicsi as Robicsek
- Zoltán Várkonyi as Diáktitkár
- Lajos Sugár as Rektor
- Valéria Hidvéghy as Julis, Balajthyék szobalánya
- Zoltán Makláry as Fényképész
- Erzsi Orsolya as Cigányasszony
- Ilona Dajbukát as Zsófi néni, csárdás
- László Misoga as Pedellus
- Marcsa Simon as Mikulásné, dajkája
- Gusztáv Vándory as Orvos
- József Kürthy as Tanfelügyelõ

== Bibliography ==
- Cunningham, John. Hungarian Cinema: From Coffee House to Multiplex. Wallflower Press, 2004.
- Juhász, István. Kincses magyar filmtár 1931-1944: az eredeti forgatókönyvből 1931 és 1944 között létrejött hazai mozgóképekről. Kráter, 2007.
- Rîpeanu, Bujor. (ed.) International Directory of Cinematographers, Set- and Costume Designers in Film: Hungary (from the beginnings to 1988). Saur, 1981.
