= A Night in Venice (1934 Hungarian film) =

1934 film

- Scene from a film
- Hungarian: Egy éj Velencében
- Directed by: Géza von Cziffra
- Written by: Johann von Vásáry
- Produced by: Emil Kovács
- Starring: Gyula Csortos; Zsuzsa Simon; Lici Balla
- Cinematography: István Eiben
- Edited by: Viktor Bánky
- Music by: László Angyal
- Production companies: Kovács Emil és Társa; UFA
- Release date: 12 January 1934
- Running time: 69 minutes
- Country: Hungary
- Language: Hungarian

A Night in Venice (Hungarian: Egy éj Velencében) is a 1934 Hungarian comedy film directed by Géza von Cziffra and starring Gyula Csortos, Zsuzsa Simon and, Lici Balla.

The film's sets were designed by the art director Márton Vincze. It was shot at the Hunnia Studios in Budapest. A separate German version A Night in Venice was also produced.

== Cast ==
- Gyula Csortos as James Harriman, millionaire
- Zsuzsa Simon as Ellen, Harriman's girlfriend
- Lici Balla as Weber Magda, Ellen's maid
- György Tarján as Gróf Antonio Grivelli
- Ella Gombaszögi as Antonio's housekeeper
- Ernő Verebes as Dr.Kovács Jenõ
- Gyula Gózon as executor
- Tino Pattiera as Italian singer
- Emil Fenyő as man in the bar
- Géza Márky as man in the hotel
- Ferenc Pataki as waiter in the restaurant in Venice
- Tibor Rubinyi as hotel porter
