= Éva Szörényi =

Hungarian actress (1917-2009)

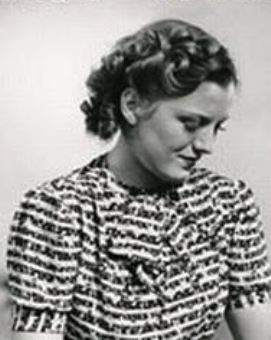
- Szörényi in 1938.
- Born: Elvira Schwáb; May 26, 1917; Budapest, Austria-Hungary
- Died: December 1, 2009 (aged 92); Studio City, California, U.S.
- Resting place: San Fernando Mission Cemetery, Mission Hills, Los Angeles, California
- Occupation: Actress
- Years active: 1935-2001
- Spouse: István Örményi (1942-19??)
- Children: István (born 1943), Tamás (born 1946), and Gábor (born 1952)
- Parent(s): Károly Schwáb, Hortenzia Lers

Éva Szörényi (born Elvira Schwáb; May 26, 1917 – December 1, 2009) was a Kossuth Prize-winning actress of the Hungarian National Theatre. Her acting career started in the early 1930s, when she played leading roles in over 20 motion pictures. As a result, she quickly became famous and beloved by the Hungarian people. Her voice also was heard frequently on the radio.

When the Hungarian Revolution 1956 broke out, Szörényi actively participated in the events. After the November 4, 1956 Soviet invasion of Hungary she left her country with her family to escape communist persecution and settled with her husband, István Örményi, and three sons, István, Tamás and Gábor, in Los Angeles.

In exile, Szörényi played an active role in the World Federation of Hungarian Freedom Fighters (WFHFF). She vowed not to visit Hungary until the last occupying Soviet soldier had left Hungary. When that happened, she returned to Hungary for the first time in 1991.

Szörényi organized fund-raising events for WFHFF in the form of literary evenings, such as regular Széchenyi tea parties and others. An active member of the Hungarian Freedom Fighters, she became the president of the Remember Hungary 1956 to commemorate the 50th anniversary of the revolution.

Éva Szörényi won awards from the presidents of Hungary Árpád Göncz, Ferenc Mádl and László Sólyom.

== Awards ==
- Kossuth Prize - 1952
- Meritorious Artist - 1954
- Magyarország Kiváló Művésze díj - 1955

== Filmography ==
- Könnyű múzsa - 1947
- Nagymama - 1935
- Madach - 1944
- Aranyora - 1946
- Uri muri - 1950
- Tavaszi szonata - 1942
- Baratsagos arcot kerek - 1936
- Szivet szivert - ?
- Benedekhaz - 1944
- Fuszer es csemege - 1940
- Elkesett level - 1941
- Sister Maria (1937)
- A Girl Sets Out (1937)
- Young Noszty and Mary Toth (1938)
- The Witch of Leányvár (1938)
- Deadly Spring (1939)
- Princess of the Puszta (1939)
- Money Talks (1940)
- Yes or No? (1940)
- Old Waltz (1941)
- Sister Beáta (1941)
- Yellow Rose (1941)
- Costume Ball (1942)
- At the End of September (1942)
- Annamária (1943)
- The Schoolmistress (1945)
- Erkel (1952)
- Perry Mason (1964) S8, E8 "The Case of a Place called Midnight" as Madame Jurgen. Listed in credits as Eva Soreny.

== Archive footage ==
- A Jávor - 1987
