= Loránd Fráter =

Hungarian composer and politician

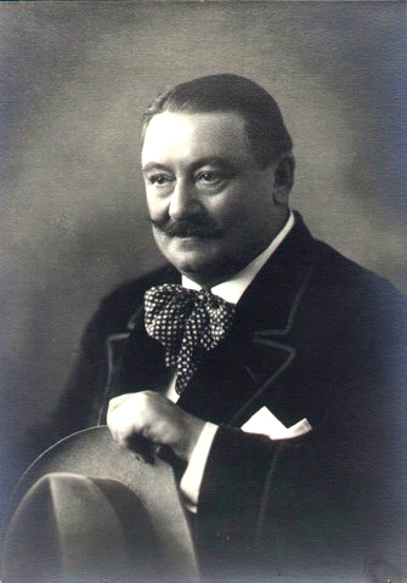
Loránd Fráter in 1920

Loránd Fráter (1872, Șimian, Bihor - 1930) was a Hungarian composer of Nóta despite not being of the Romani people. He was also a politician. He was a major songwriter of the early 20th century. He was depicted by Antal Páger in the 1942 biographical film Lóránd Fráter.
