= Teri Náray =

Hungarian actress

Said Naciri
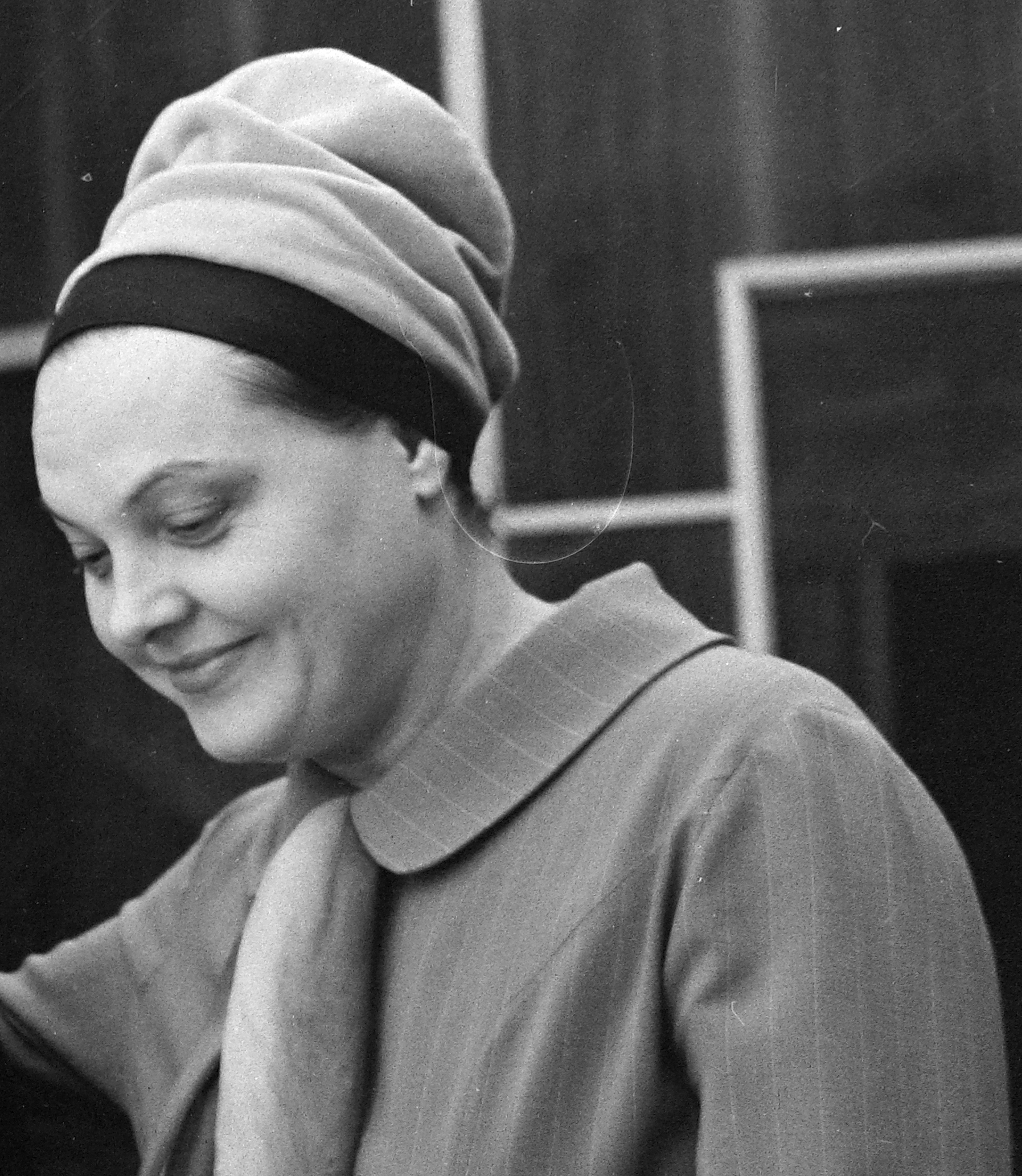
- Born: 26 September 1916; Orosháza, Austria-Hungary
- Died: 21 April 1995 (aged 78); Budapest, Hungary
- Occupations: Actor; Comedian; Producer

Teri Náray (born Teréz Náray; 20 September 1916 – 21 April 1995) was a Hungarian actress. She began a long career on stage at the Terézkörúti Theatre in 1936 and joined the Comedy Theatre of Budapest (Vígszínház) in Budapest 2 years later. From 1951 to 1957 she was an actress at the Youth Theatre, after which she was at the Attila József Theatre until 1972. Among her notable stage roles were Marion in J. B. Priestley's The Linden Tree, Almina Clare in Noël Coward's Waiting in the Wings and Donátffyné in Ede Szigligeti's Fenn az ernyő, nincsen kas. In 1976 she appeared in the TV mini series Beszterce ostroma, and in 1984 she starred in the mini TV series Különös házasság.
