= I Married an Angel (film) =

1942 film by W. S. Van Dyke, Roy Del Ruth, Hunt Stromberg

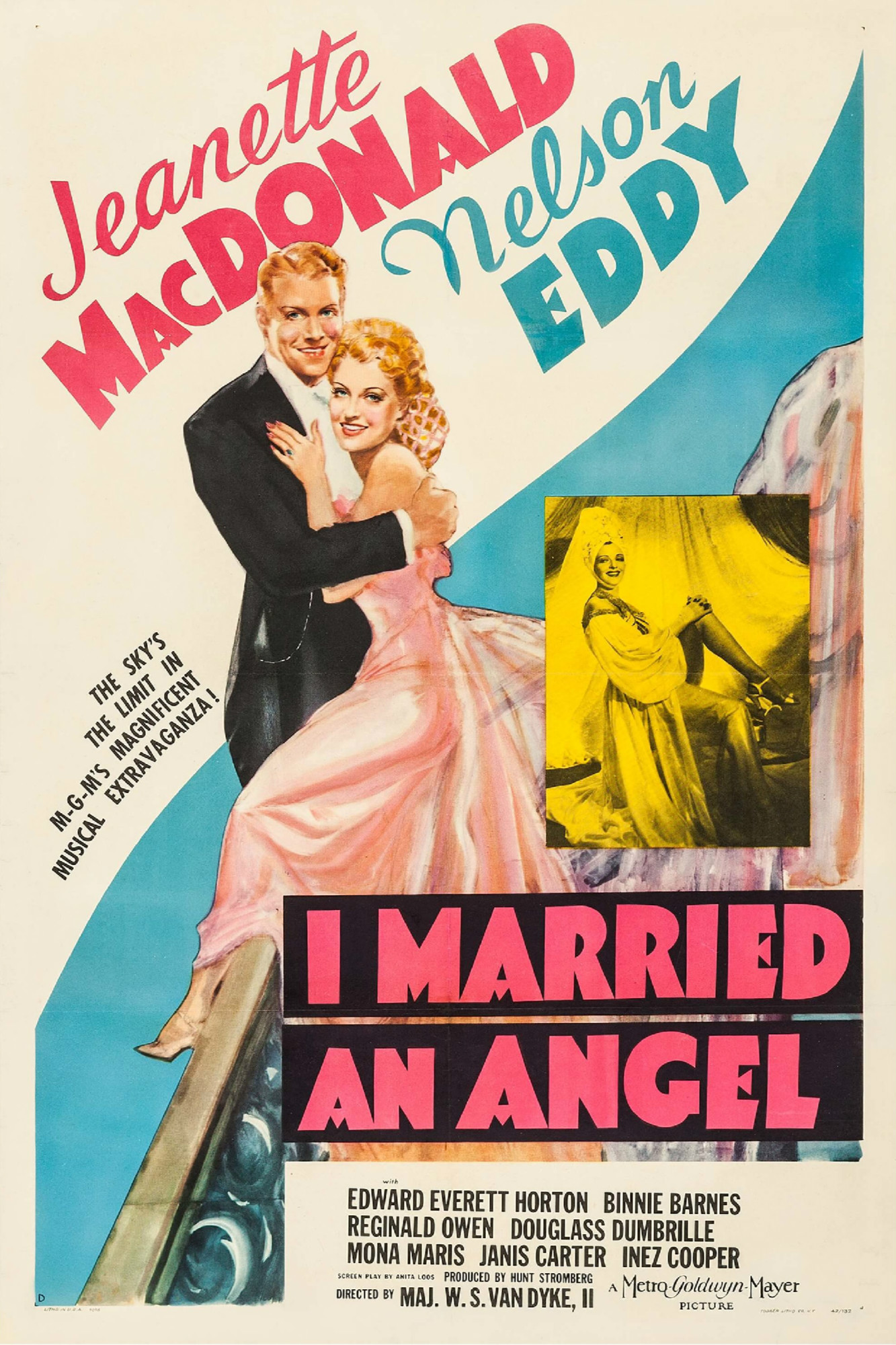
- Theatrical poster
- Directed by: W. S. Van Dyke
- Screenplay by: Anita Loos
- Based on: I Married an Angel; 1938 musical by Richard Rodgers; Lorenz Hart from 1938 play Angyalt Vettem Felesegul by Vaszary Janos
- Produced by: Hunt Stromberg
- Starring: Jeanette MacDonald; Nelson Eddy
- Cinematography: Ray June
- Edited by: Conrad A. Nervig
- Music by: Richard Rodgers; Lorenz Hart; Herbert Stothart; George Forrest; Robert Wright
- Distributed by: Metro-Goldwyn-Mayer
- Release date: July 9, 1942 (U.S.)
- Running time: 84 minutes
- Country: United States
- Language: English
- Budget: $1,492,000
- Box office: $1,236,000

I Married an Angel is a 1942 American musical film based on the 1938 musical comedy of the same name by Rodgers and Hart. The film was directed by W. S. Van Dyke and starred Jeanette MacDonald and Nelson Eddy, who were then a popular onscreen couple. Supporting cast members included Edward Everett Horton, Binnie Barnes, Reginald Owen, Douglass Dumbrille, and Mona Maris.

== Plot ==
Popular among the ladies of Budapest, banker Count Willie Palaffi seeks true love as he approaches his 35th birthday.

At the last minute, "Whiskers," his kindly mentor, invites a junior secretary, Anna Zador to the lavish party. The Count's senior secretary is jealous and arranges for a simple foil and wire angel costume, expecting Anna to be ridiculed.

Anna arrives to laughter and snickers, except from the Count who seems enthralled by her simple beauty and kindness.

Tired of the party, the Count retires to his room to sleep. Brigitta, an angel, soon flies into his dream life.

During his sleep, he discovers what he really desires, and that is Anna (Brigitta from his dreams) to be his wife. Flaws and all.

The prospect of being married to "The Perfect Woman" (An Angel) proves to have some drawbacks—Angels are incapable of telling a lie, so Brigitta tells blunt truths about their physical appearances to all of the influential women in town and reveals several extramaritial affairs. She is also horrified when she is gifted with a fur coat, and she doesn't know what an Earthly bed is("I sleep on a fluffy white cloud").

== Cast ==
- Jeanette MacDonald as Anna / Brigitta
- Nelson Eddy as Count Palaffi
- Edward Everett Horton as Peter
- Binnie Barnes as Peggy
- Reginald Owen as 'Whiskers'
- Douglass Dumbrille as Baron Szigethy
- Mona Maris as Marika
- Janis Carter as Sufi
- Inez Cooper as Iren
- Leonid Kinskey as Zinski
- Anne Jeffreys as Polly
- Marion Rosamond as Dolly

== Music ==
It featured several additional songs not written by Rodgers and Hart. Romantic composer Eva Dell'Acqua's song "Villanelle" for coloratura soprano appeared on the soundtrack of the film.

- "But What of Truth?" (written for the 1942 film with music by Herbert Stothart and lyrics by George Forrest and Robert Wright)
- "Hey Butcher" (written for the 1942 film with music by Herbert Stothart and lyrics by George Forrest and Robert Wright)
- "May I Present the Girl" (written for the 1942 film with music by Herbert Stothart and lyrics by George Forrest and Robert Wright)
- "There Comes a Time" (written for the 1942 film with music by Herbert Stothart and lyrics by George Forrest and Robert Wright)
- "Tira Lira La" (written for the 1942 film with music by Richard Rodgers and lyrics by George Forrest and Robert Wright)
- "To Count Palaffi" (written for the 1942 film with music by Herbert Stothart and lyrics by George Forrest and Robert Wright)

== Reception ==
According to MGM records, the film earned $664,000 at the United States and Canadian box office and $572,000 elsewhere, costing the studio a loss of $725,000 - the studio's least successful film of 1942. It was the last of the MacDonald-Eddy films.
