= Viktor Bánky =

- Born: 17 January 1899; Nagydorog; Austria-Hungary
- Died: 13 March 1967 (aged 68); Munich; West Germany
- Occupations: Film editor Film director
- Years active: 1934 - 1944

Viktor Bánky (17 January 1899 – 13 March 1967) was a Hungarian film editor and director.

He was the brother of the actress Vilma Bánky who enjoyed Hollywood stardom in the 1920s. He was initially employed in the German film industry, then the largest in Europe, before returning to Budapest in 1933 when new restrictions made it harder for Hungarians to work in Berlin.

Attributing his initial struggles to gain employment in the Hungarian film industry to discrimination against non-Jews by Jewish producers and directors such as Joe Pasternak and Ernő Gál he increasingly aligned with the populist Hungarian nationalist movement.

He was involved in producing antisemitic films and the expulsion of Jews from filmmaking. Following the end of the Second World War he was accused of "crimes against the people" and sentenced to six months in prison. He ended up going into exile from the Communist Hungarian regime and settled in West Germany.

== Selected filmography ==
=== Editor ===
- A Night in Venice (1934)
- The Students of Igloi (1935)
- Dream Love (1935)
- Where the Lark Sings (1936)
- Fräulein Veronika (1936)
- Sein letztes Modell (1937)
- The Borrowed Castle (1937)
- All Men Are Crazy (1937)
- Young Noszty and Mary Toth (1938)
- Barbara in America (1938)
- The Wrong Man (1938)
- The Witch of Leányvár (1938)
- Magda Expelled (1938)
- Janos the Valiant (1939)
- Money Is Coming (1939)
- The Five-Forty (1939)
- András (1941)

=== Director ===
- The Minister's Friend (1939)
- The Ball Is On (1939)
- Istvan Bors (1939)
- Yes or No? (1940)
- András (1941)
- The Devil Doesn't Sleep (1941)
- Today, Yesterday and Tomorrow (1941)
- Property for Sale (1941)
- Old Waltz (1941)
- At the Crossroads (1942)
- Dr. Kovács István (1942)
- Borrowed Husbands (1942)
- Changing the Guard (1942)
- Makacs Kata (1943)
- It Begins with Marriage (1943)
- I'll Make You Happy (1944)

== Bibliography ==
- Cunningham, John. Hungarian Cinema: From Coffee House to Multiplex. Wallflower Press, 2004.
- Frey, David. Jews, Nazis and the Cinema of Hungary: The Tragedy of Success, 1929-1944. Bloomsbury Publishing, 2017.
