= 8th Venice International Film Festival (void) =

Italian film festival in 1940

"8th" (void) Venice International Film Festival
- Festival poster
- Location: Venice, Italy
- Founded: 1932
- Festival date: 1 – 8 September 1940
- Website: Website

The "8th" annual (void) Venice International Film Festival was held from September 1 to September 8, 1940, less than three months after Italy had belatedly entered the Second World War as Germany's ally. The events were held in places far away from the Lido, and very few countries participated due to World War II and directors that were members of the Rome–Berlin axis. In fact the Festival lost its ‘international’ designation that year, as the war had reduced the number of participating nations to just three: Italy, Germany and, in a sparring role, Hungary. It became therefore the "Manifestazione cinematografica italo-tedesca", to reflect its Italo-German character. The two countries participated with seven feature films each, while Hungary had three. Additionally, a strong fascist political meddling from the Italian fascist government under Benito Mussolini had led to Italy experiencing a period of cultural depression oppressed by fascist propaganda.

== Jury ==
Although the festival is still competitive it takes place without an official jury. Awards are given by the festival's president based on the decision of Italian and German film delegates.

== In Competition ==
English title	Original title	Director(s)	Production country
A Mother's Love	Mutterliebe	Gustav Ucicky	Nazi Germany
Befreite Hände		Hans Schweikart	Nazi Germany
Der Postmeister		Gustav Ucicky	Nazi Germany
Jud Süß		Veit Harlan	Nazi Germany
Muž z neznáma		Martin Frič	Czechoslovakia
Opera Ball	Opernball	Géza von Bolváry	Nazi Germany
Oltre l'amore		Carmine Gallone	Kingdom of Italy
La peccatrice		Amleto Palermi	Kingdom of Italy
The Siege of the Alcazar	L'assedio dell'Alcazar	Augusto Genina	Kingdom of Italy, Spain
Trenck, der Pandur		Herbert Selpin	Nazi Germany

== Official Awards ==
- Mussolini Cup:
  - Best Foreign Film: Der Postmeister by Gustav Ucicky
  - Best Italian Film: The Siege of the Alcazar by Augusto Genina
- Golden Crown: Jud Süß by Veit Harlan
