= Lili Muráti =

Hungarian actress (1914–2003)

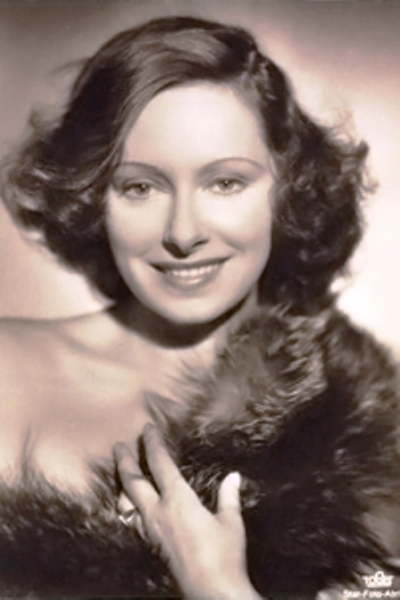
- Muráti in 1940
- Born: 22 July 1914; Nagyvárad, Austro-Hungarian Empire
- Died: 16 April 2003 (aged 88); Madrid, Spain
- Occupation: Actress
- Years active: 1935–1993 (film and TV)

Lili Muráti (22 July 1914 – 16 April 2003) was a Hungarian film and stage actress. After several years working in the theatre, she emerged as a film star in the mid-1930s, playing spirited, modern girls. She was accused of collaborating with the Nazis during the 1940s. After the Second World War she went into exile from Communist Hungary and settled in Spain, where she worked as an announcer on the Hungarian broadcasts of Spanish National Radio. She was married to Johann von Vásáry from 1941 until his death in 1963. She began appearing in smaller roles as a character actress including Doctor Zhivago.

== Selected filmography ==
- The Homely Girl (1935)
- Miss President (1935)
- Pay Up, Madam! (1937)
- 120 Kilometres an Hour (1937)
- Yes or No? (1940)
- Finally! (1941)
- The Perfect Family (1942)
- It Begins with Marriage (1943)
- The Night Girl (1943)
- I Dreamed of You (1943)
- It Happened in Budapest (1944)
- Stop at Tenerife (1964)
- Doctor Zhivago (1965)

== Bibliography ==
- Neubauer, John & Török, Borbála Zsuzsanna. The Exile and Return of Writers from East-Central Europe: A Compendium. Walter de Gruyter, 2009.
- Ostrowska, Dorota, Pitassio, Francesco & Varga, Zsuzsanna. Popular Cinemas in East Central Europe: Film Cultures and Histories. Bloomsbury Publishing, 2017.
