= Miklós Hajmássy =

Hungarian actor

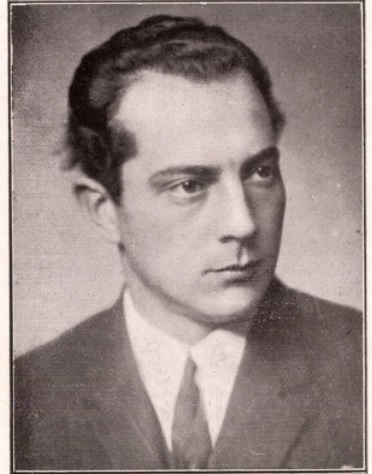
- Hajmássy in 1929
- Born: 2 July 1900; Zalaegerszeg, Austro-Hungarian Empire
- Died: 1 March 1990 (aged 89); Buenos Aires, Argentina
- Occupation: Actor
- Years active: 1928–1944 (film)

Miklós Hajmássy (1900–1990) was a Hungarian stage and film actor. A prominent actor of the Horthy era, he emigrated to Argentina following the Second World War where he was active with the Hungarian National Theatre in Buenos Aires.

== Selected filmography ==
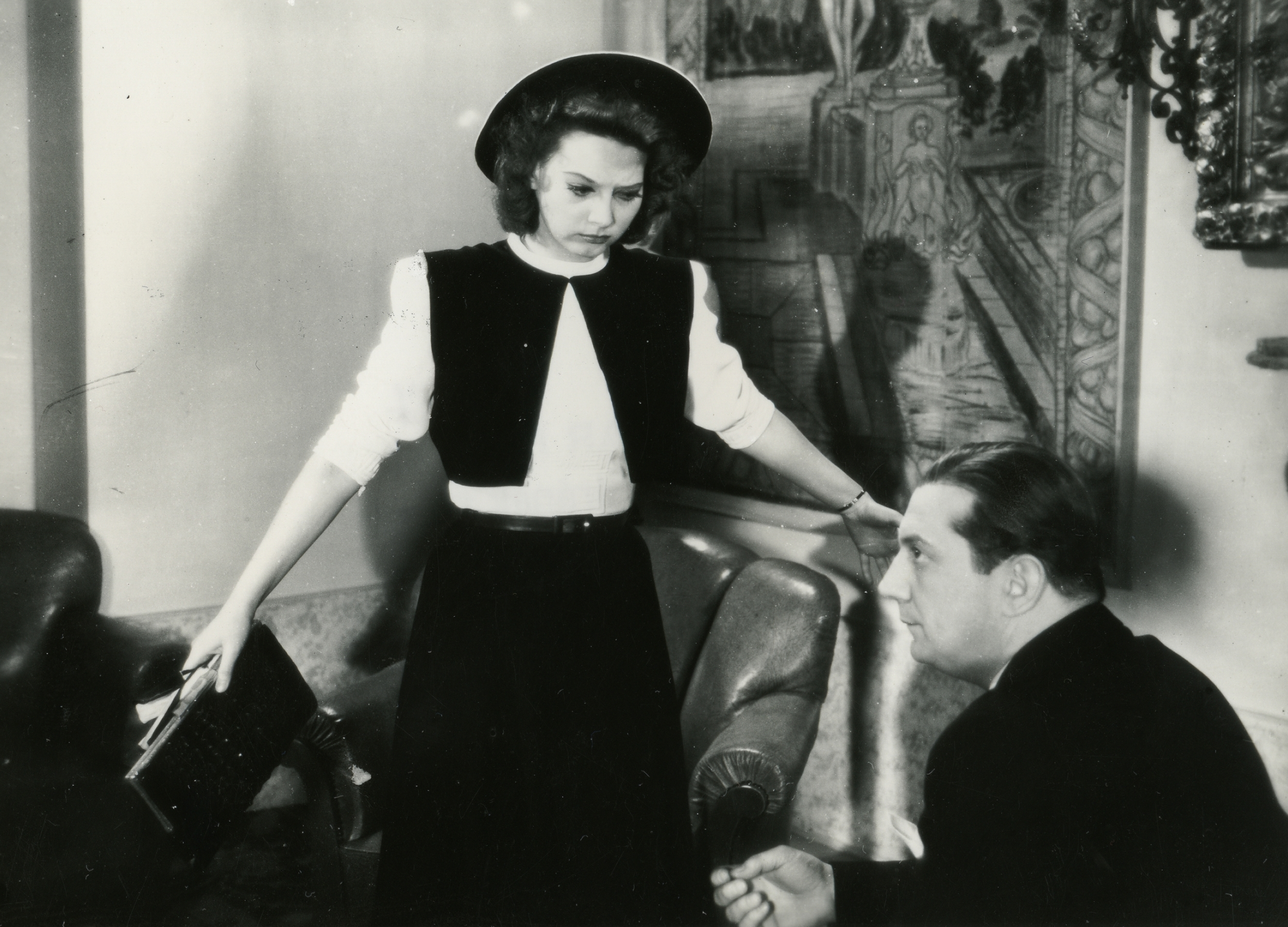
With Zita Szeleczky in Édes ellenfél (1941).

- Stolen Wednesday (1933)
- Barbara in America (1938)
- Princess of the Puszta (1939)
- Hungary's Revival (1939)
- The Five-Forty (1939)
- The Last of the Vereczkeys (1940)
- One Night in Transylvania (1941)
- The Devil Doesn't Sleep (1941)
- The Gyurkovics Boys (1941)
- Europe Doesn't Answer (1941)
- Temptation (1942)
- We'll Know By Midnight (1942)
- Guard House Number 5 (1942)
- The Perfect Family (1942)
- Disillusion (1943)
- Siamese Cat (1943)
- Quite a Lad (1943)
- It Begins with Marriage (1943)
- I'll Make You Happy (1944)
- It Happened in Budapest (1944)

== Bibliography ==
- Nemeskürty, István & Szántó, Tibor. A Pictorial Guide to the Hungarian Cinema, 1901-1984. Helikon, 1985.
