= Rózsa Nemes =

1943 film

- Directed by: Emil Martonffi
- Written by: Emil Martonffi
- Produced by: Lajos Güttler
- Starring: Elma Bulla; Erzsi Simor; Vilma Medgyaszay
- Cinematography: Lajos Kerti
- Music by: Imre Füredi
- Production company: Palatinus Filmterjesztõ Vállalat
- Release date: 1943
- Running time: 79 minutes
- Country: Hungary
- Language: Hungarian

Rózsa Nemes (Hungarian: Nemes Rózsa) is a 1943 Hungarian drama film directed by Emil Martonffi and starring Elma Bulla, Erzsi Simor and Vilma Medgyaszay. It was shot at the Hunnia Studios in Budapest. The film's sets were designed by the art directors István Básthy and Sándor Iliszi.

== Cast ==
- Elma Bulla as Nemes Rózsa
- Erzsi Simor as Veszprémy Lona
- Vilma Medgyaszay as özvegy Veszprémyné
- Tibor Halmay as Veszprémy Zénó
- Jenö Pataky as Veszprémy Viktor
- Béla Fáy as Bödnár jószágigazgató
- József Bihari as Paprugó Vendel
- Erzsi Orsolya as Tanítónõ
- Gyözö Kabók as Fogarasi, falusi bíró
- György Solthy as Menyhárt - ügyvéd
- Endre C. Turáni as. Félix - az inas
- Ferenc Szabó as Inas
- István Falussy as Szülészorvos
- Erzsike Hajdu as Falusi kislány
- József Medgyessy as Nemes Rozál gyermekét nevelõ falusi házaspár
- Tyra Németh as Félix felesége

== Bibliography ==
- Juhász, István. Kincses magyar filmtár 1931-1944: az eredeti forgatókönyvből 1931 és 1944 között létrejött hazai mozgóképekről. Kráter, 2007.
- Nemes, Károly . Miért jók a magyar filmek?: Tanulmányok. Magvetʺo, 1968.
- Rîpeanu, Bujor. (ed.) International Directory of Cinematographers, Set- and Costume Designers in Film: Hungary (from the beginnings to 1988). Saur, 1981.
