= Escape to the Adriatic =

- Directed by: Eugen Schulz-Breiden
- Written by: Eugen Schulz-Breiden; Josef Roden (novel)
- Starring: Rolf Wanka; Willi Volker; Rózsi Csikós
- Cinematography: Jan Roth
- Edited by: Marie Bourová; Svatopluk Innemann
- Music by: Rudolf Maria Mandée
- Production companies: Meissner Film Prague; Tassul Film
- Distributed by: Meissner Film Prague
- Release date: 1937
- Countries: Austria; Czechoslovakia
- Language: German

Escape to the Adriatic (German: Flucht an die Adria) is a 1937 Austrian-Czech drama film directed by Eugen Schulz-Breiden and starring Rolf Wanka, Willi Volker and Rózsi Csikós. In Germany it was released in 1939 under the title Sprung ins Glück.

It was shot at the Barrandov Studios in Prague. The film's sets were designed by the art director Gottlieb Hesch. A separate Czech version Irca's Romance was also released.

== Cast ==
- Rolf Wanka as Fred Bergen - Monteur
- Willi Volker as Generaldirektor Bongardt
- Rózsi Csikós as Friedl - seine Tochter
- Tibor Halmay as Harry Peters - sein Neffe
- Lizzi Holzschuh as Lolo - Harrys Freundin
- Else Lord as Frau Schulz

== Bibliography ==
- Goble, Alan. The Complete Index to Literary Sources in Film. Walter de Gruyter, 1999.
