= Vera Sennyei =

Hungarian actress (1915–1962)

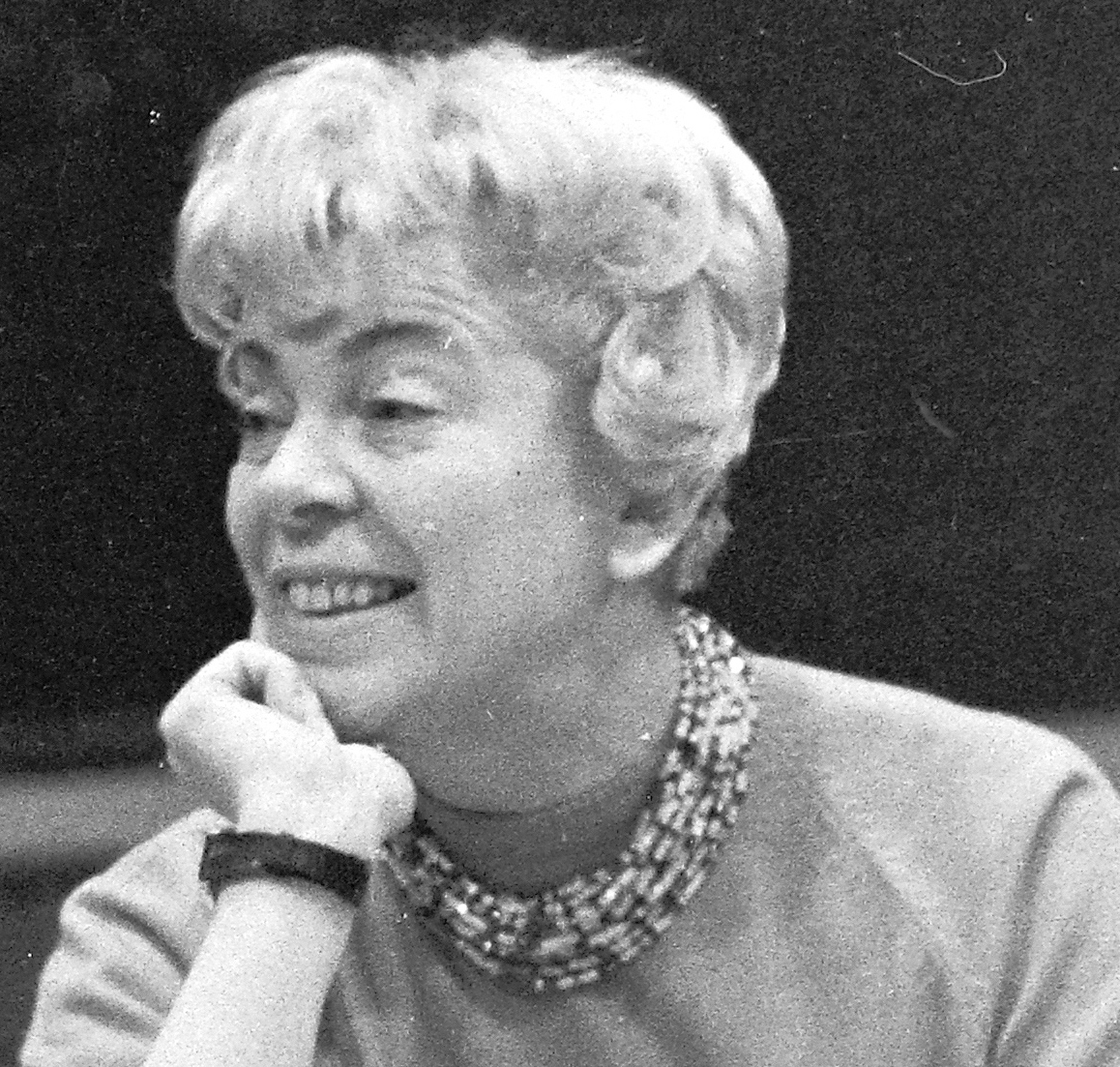
- Sennyei in 1965
- Born: 3 January 1915; Budapest, Austro-Hungarian Empire
- Died: 28 May 1962 (aged 47); Budapest, Hungary
- Occupation: Actress
- Years active: 1937–1962 (film)

Vera Sennyei (3 January 1915 – 28 May 1962) was a Hungarian stage and film actress. She was married three times including to the actors Árpád Lehotay and Imre Apáthi.

== Selected filmography ==
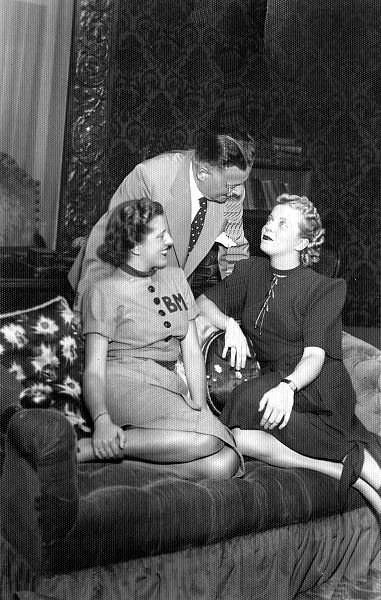
Sennyei (right) in 1938

- Sweet Revenge (1937)
- My Daughter Is Different (1937)
- Help, I'm an Heiress (1937)
- You Are the Song (1940)
- Don't Ask Who I Was (1941)
- At the Crossroads (1942)
- Majális (1943)
- Disillusion (1943)
- Kiskrajcár (1953)
- Eltüsszentett birodalom (1956)
- Délibáb minden mennyiségben (1960)

== Bibliography ==
- Illés, Jenö. Színészarcok a közelmúltból. Gondolat, 1968.
- Juhász, István. Kincses magyar filmtár 1931-1944: az eredeti forgatókönyvből 1931 és 1944 között létrejött hazai mozgóképekről. Kráter, 2007.
