= Margit Árpád =

Hungarian actress (1903–1980)

- Born: 24 December 1903; Borosjenõ, Austro-Hungarian Empire
- Died: 29 February 1980 (aged 76); Budapest, Hungary
- Occupation: Actress
- Years active: 1938–1957 (film)

Margit Árpád (1903–1980) was a Hungarian stage actor, who also made occasional film appearances. She featured at the various theatres in the capital Budapest and elsewhere. During the early 1930s she was briefly married to fellow actor László Perényi.

== Selected filmography ==
- The Poor Rich (1938)
- No Coincidence (1939)
- Semmelweis (1940)
- The Gyurkovics Boys (1941)
- I Am Guilty (1942)
- Házasság (1942)
- Cadet Love (1942)
- Magdolna (1942)
- At Midnight (1957)

== Bibliography ==
- Kramme, Ulrike. Ungarisches biographisches Archiv: Fiche 1-21. A.R.-Azzo. K.G. Saur Verlag, 1993.
- Székely, György & Gajdó, Tamás. Magyar színháztörténet: 1920-1949. Akadémiai Kiadó, 1990.
