= Ana Esmeralda =

Spanish actress (1931–2022)

- Born: 7 December 1928; Spanish Morocco
- Died: 22 November 2022 (aged 93); São Paulo
- Occupation: Actress
- Years active: 1948-1965 (film)

Ana Esmeralda (7 December 1931 – 22 November 2022) was a Moroccan-born Spanish film actress.

== Selected filmography ==
- Lola the Coalgirl (1952)
- María Dolores (1953)
- Bronze and Moon (1953)
- Carmen (1953)
- Who Killed Anabela? (1956)
- College Boarding House (1959)
- La casa de la Troya (1959)
- São Paulo, Sociedade Anônima (1965)

== Bibliography ==
- Goble, Alan. The Complete Index to Literary Sources in Film. Walter de Gruyter, 1999.
