= A Gentleman for Hire =

1930 film directed by Géza von Bolváry

- Directed by: Géza von Bolváry
- Written by: Walter Reisch
- Produced by: Julius Haimann
- Starring: Willi Forst; Paul Hörbiger; Trude Lieske
- Cinematography: Willy Goldberger
- Music by: Robert Stolz
- Production company: Super-Film
- Distributed by: Super-Film
- Release date: 19 December 1930
- Running time: 92 minutes
- Country: Germany
- Language: German

A Gentleman for Hire (German: Der Herr auf Bestellung) is a 1930 German musical comedy film directed by Géza von Bolváry and starring Willi Forst, Paul Hörbiger and Trude Lieske. The film's sets were designed by the art director Robert Neppach. It is also known as The Darling of Vienna, the title by which it was released in the United States in 1933.

== Cast ==
- Willi Forst as Carry Clips, ein Festredner
- Paul Hörbiger as Prof. Amanuel Wielander
- Trude Lieske as Frau Baronin Lindenwörth
- Else Elster as Lillebil
- Elma Bulla as Titi
- Wilhelm Bendow as Dr. Cajetan
- Henry Bender as Ein Schutzmann
- Albert Paulig as Herr Hinzemann
- Johanna Ewald as Frau Hinzemann
- Franz Roth as Gefängniswärter

== Bibliography ==
- Rosamund Davies, Paolo Russo & Claus Tieber. The Palgrave Handbook of Screenwriting Studies. Springer Nature, 2023.
- Waldman, Harry. Nazi Films in America, 1933–1942. McFarland, 2008.
