= Vera Szemere =

Hungarian actress

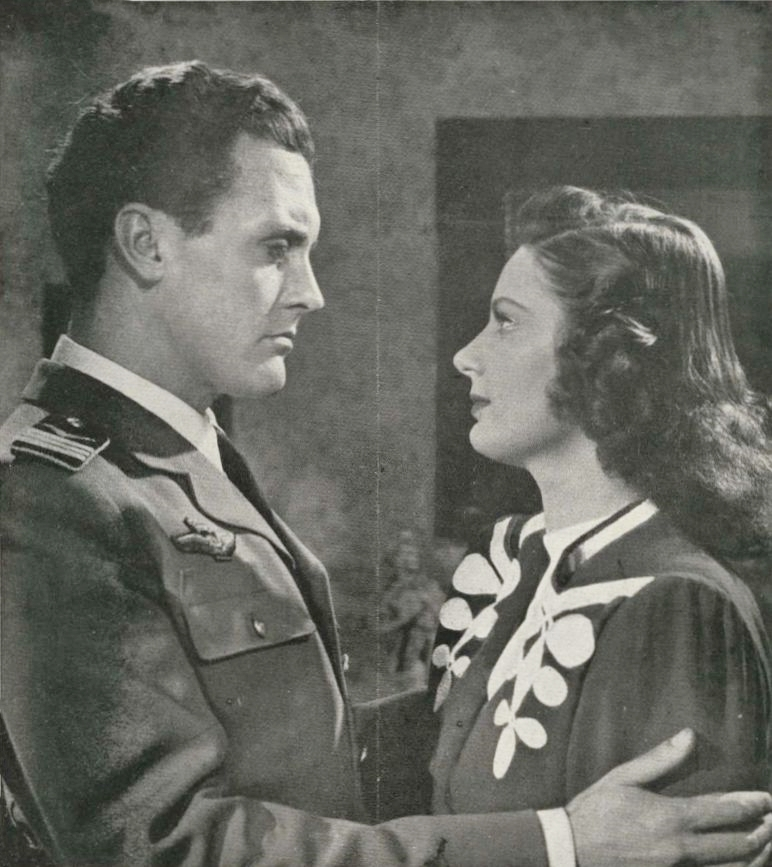
- With László Perényi in the 1944 film Hungarian Eagles
- Born: August 6, 1923; Budapest, Kingdom of Hungary
- Died: April 3, 1995 (aged 71); Budapest, Hungary
- Burial place: Farkasréti Cemetery
- Education: National Royal Hungarian Academy of Dramatic Arts (1942)
- Occupation: Actress
- Years active: 1942–1995
- Spouse: Zoltán Várkonyi (married 1946–1979, his death)
- Children: Gábor Várkonyi
- Awards: Hungarian Merited Artist Award (1976)

Vera Szemere (born Seligmann 6 August 1923 – 3 April 1995) was a Hungarian actress.

== Selected filmography ==
- Gyávaság (1942)
- Male Fidelity (1942)
- Changing the Guard (1942)
- Suburban Guard Post (1943)
- Time of Trial (1942)
- Hungarian Eagles (1944)
- Boy or Girl? (1944)
- Wildfire (1944)
- Hot Fields (1949)
- Ward 9 (1955)
- A Strange Mask of Identity (1955)
- Liliomfi (1956)
- Pillar of Salt (1958)
- Lady-Killer in Trouble (1964)
- Story of My Foolishness (1966)
- Kárpáthy Zoltán (1966)
- Temporary Cloudiness (1967)
- Stars of Eger (1968)
- Alfa Romeó és Júlia (1969)
