= Guard House Number 5 =

1943 film

- Directed by: Frigyes Bán
- Written by: Zoltán Szitnyai (novel); Frigyes Bán; Henrik Castiglione
- Produced by: Henrik Castiglione; József Golda; Ernö Gottesmann
- Starring: Elma Bulla; Pál Jávor; Miklós Hajmássy
- Cinematography: Barnabás Hegyi
- Edited by: László Katonka
- Music by: Dezsõ Losonczy
- Production company: Sláger Film
- Release date: 11 April 1942
- Running time: 92 minutes
- Country: Hungary
- Language: Hungarian

Guard House Number 5 (Hungarian: Az 5-ös számú örház) is a 1942 Hungarian mystery drama film directed by Frigyes Bán and starring Elma Bulla, Pál Jávor and Miklós Hajmássy. It was shot at the Hunnia Studios in Budapest. The film's sets were designed by the art director István Básthy.

== Synopsis ==
András, a railway worker, is suspected of murdering his wife's Zsuzsa former lover after a corpse is found on the track. The man had paid a visit in his absence to the guard house where the couple live.

== Cast ==
- Elma Bulla as Zsuzsa
- Pál Jávor as András
- Miklós Hajmássy as Török Kálmán - jegyzõ
- József Bihari as Kasza Péter
- Imre Toronyi as Vizsgálóbíró
- István Falussy as Vendég a bálon
- Gusztáv Harasztos as Orvos
- Lajos Kelemen as Csendõr
- István Lontay as Vizsgálóbíró
- Ferenc Pethes as Irnok
- Gusztáv Vándory as Állomásfõnök
- Ilona Kökény
- Ferenc Járay

== Bibliography ==
- Balski, Grzegorz. Directory of Eastern European Film-makers and Films 1945–1991. Flicks Books, 1992.
- Juhász, István. Kincses magyar filmtár 1931–1944: az eredeti forgatókönyvből 1931 és 1944 között létrejött hazai mozgóképekről. Kráter, 2007.
- Kulcsár, István Karcsai & Veress József. Magyar filmkalauz: negyven év száz magyar nagyjátékfilmje. Magyar Filmintézet, 1985.
- Rîpeanu, Bujor. (ed.) International Directory of Cinematographers, Set- and Costume Designers in Film: Hungary (from the beginnings to 1988). Saur, 1981.
