= Quite a Lad =

1943 film

- Directed by: Frigyes Bán
- Written by: Kató Timár
- Produced by: Henrik Castiglione; József Golda; Ernö Gottesmann
- Starring: Miklós Hajmássy; Rózsi Csikós; Ferenc Pethes
- Cinematography: Barnabás Hegyi
- Music by: Károly De Fries
- Production companies: Siker Film; Magyar Filmiroda
- Release date: 8 April 1943
- Running time: 77 minutes
- Country: Hungary
- Language: Hungarian

Quite a Lad or Clever Boy (Hungarian: Legény a gáton) is a 1943 Hungarian comedy film directed by Frigyes Bán and starring Miklós Hajmássy, Rózsi Csikós and Ferenc Pethes. It was shot at the Hunnia Studios in Budapest.

== Synopsis ==
To impress his wife, who has lost confidence in him, a man hires a group of actors to pretend to be bandits so he can beat off their attack. However, confusion arises when the couple are accosted by a real gang of outlaws.

== Cast ==
- Miklós Hajmássy as Rablóvezér
- Rózsi Csikós as Menyasszony
- Ferenc Pethes as Võlegény
- József Juhász as A menyasszony apja
- Piroska Vaszary as A menyasszony anyja
- Lajos Alszeghy
- Mária Deésy
- László Dési
- Gyula Köváry
- Zoltán Makláry
- László Misoga
- Cheo Morejón
- Sándor Pethes
- László Pálóczi
- Erzsi Rév
- Gusztáv Vándory

== Bibliography ==
- Balski, Grzegorz. Directory of Eastern European Film-makers and Films 1945–1991. Flicks Books, 1992.
- Juhász, István. Kincses magyar filmtár 1931–1944: az eredeti forgatókönyvből 1931 és 1944 között létrejött hazai mozgóképekről. Kráter, 2007.
- Rîpeanu, Bujor. (ed.) International Directory of Cinematographers, Set- and Costume Designers in Film: Hungary (from the beginnings to 1988). Saur, 1981.
