= María Dolores =

1953 film by José María Elorrieta

- Directed by: José María Elorrieta
- Written by: Francisco Cossío hijo Ignacio Rived
- Cinematography: Alfonso Nieva
- Edited by: Petra de Nieva
- Music by: Fernando García Morcillo
- Production companies: Cinematografía Cinex; Universitas Films
- Release date: 22 August 1953
- Running time: 90 minutes
- Country: Spain
- Language: Spanish

María Dolores is a 1953 Spanish drama film directed by José María Elorrieta.

== Cast ==
- Mariano Alcón
- Rafael Cortés
- Francisco Cossío hijo
- Ignacio Coy
- Beni Deus
- José Escanero
- Ana Esmeralda
- Gonzalo Guillén
- Casimiro Hurtado
- Aurelio Lasala
- José María Martín
- José Manuel Meana
- Miguel Milá
- Fernando Nogueras
- Alfredo Obarrio
- Maite Pardo
- José María Romeo
- Diana Salcedo
- Fernando Sancho
- José María Sevilla
- Jaime Torremocha

== Bibliography ==
- Francesc Sánchez Barba. Brumas del franquismo: el auge del cine negro español (1950-1965). Edicions Universitat Barcelona, 2007.
