= Mouse in the Palace =

1943 film

- Directed by: Emil Martonffi
- Written by: Emil Martonffi; Attila Orbók
- Produced by: Ervin Kolczonay; Dezsõ Németh
- Starring: Margit Makay; Gábor Rajnay; Romola Németh
- Cinematography: Ferenc Fekete; Barnabás Hegyi
- Edited by: Zoltán Kerényi
- Music by: Dénes Zakál
- Production company: Kolczonay Filmgyártó Vállalat
- Release date: 30 June 1943
- Running time: 79 minutes
- Country: Hungary
- Language: Hungarian

Mouse in the Palace (Hungarian: Egér a palotában) is a 1943 Hungarian comedy film directed by Emil Martonffi and starring Margit Makay, Gábor Rajnay and Romola Németh. It was shot at the Hunnia Studios in Budapest. The film's sets were designed by the art directors István Básthy and Sándor Iliszi.

== Cast ==
- Margit Makay as Lugossyné
- Gábor Rajnay as Lugossy
- Romola Németh as Eszter, Lugossy lánya
- Gyula Benkö as Bárány Sándor, számtantanár
- Rózsi Csikós as Zizi
- László Pálóczi as Jazz karmester
- Blanka Raffay as Sári
- Tibor Puskás as Pubi
- Piroska Vaszary as Szomorúné
- Kálmán Pataky as Szedlacsek
- Zoltán Makláry as Gyula úr
- Piri Peéry as Igazgatónõ
- György Solthy as Sári apja
- Viola Orbán as Tanárnõ
- Jenö Danis as Orbán, öreg számtantanár
- Mici Haraszti as Egy intézeti növendék anyja
- Lajos Boray as Orvos
- Zojka Matyasovszky as Klári, intézeti növendék
- Gusztáv Pártos as Szállodaigazgató
- Lajos Sugár as Portás
- István Lontay as Szállodai alkalmazott
- Ottó Jeney as Tihamér, pincér
- Sándor Fülöp as Pincér
- Lajos Alszeghy as Sakkozó férfi a szállodában
- Gyöngyi Váradi as Lugossy titkárnõje
- Gyöngyi Zádor as Pubi barátnõje
- Mária Ékes as Lugossyné szobalánya

== Bibliography ==
- Cunningham, John. Hungarian Cinema: From Coffee House to Multiplex. Wallflower Press, 2004.
- Juhász, István. Kincses magyar filmtár 1931-1944: az eredeti forgatókönyvből 1931 és 1944 között létrejött hazai mozgóképekről. Kráter, 2007.
- Rîpeanu, Bujor. (ed.) International Directory of Cinematographers, Set- and Costume Designers in Film: Hungary (from the beginnings to 1988). Saur, 1981.
