= Hungarian Eagles =

1944 film

- Directed by: István László
- Written by: István Jánossy; Géza Matolay
- Produced by: Klára B. Kokas
- Starring: László Perényi; Vera Szemere; Éva Serényi
- Cinematography: Rudolf Icsey; József Karbán; Zoltán Kárpáthy; Mihály Paulovits; Rudolf Piller
- Edited by: László Katonka
- Music by: Béla Dolecskó
- Production company: Kokas Film
- Release date: 25 May 1944
- Running time: 88 minutes
- Country: Hungary
- Language: Hungarian

Hungarian Eagles (Hungarian: Magyar sasok) is a 1944 Hungarian war drama film directed by István László and starring László Perényi, Vera Szemere and Éva Serényi. It was shot partly at the Hunnia Studios in Budapest. The film's sets were designed by the art director Klára B. Kokas, who also produced the film.

== Cast ==
- László Perényi as Torday százados
- Vera Szemere as Mária
- András Stolpa as Bandi
- Lili Kertay as Bandi menyasszonyjelöltje
- Éva Serényi as Maďarské království
- Judit Farkas as Jutka - Mária húga
- Béla Fáy as Ervin - a kém
- Lenke Csanádi as ápolónö
- József Cselényi as Feri, éneklö katona
- Géza Halász as Béla
- István Lontay as Nyomozó
- Tihamér Lázár as az Árpád Repülõgépgyár igazgatója
- Antal Matány as Nyomozó
- Elemér Thury as Rakousko-Uhersko
- Ilus Vay as Maďarské království
- Gida von Lazar as Rakousko-Uhersko
- Zoltán Makláry as Rakousko-Uhersko
- Ferenc Nagy
- Sándor Pethes
- János Schneck
- Éva Fenyvessy
- István Simon

== Bibliography ==
- Juhász, István. Kincses magyar filmtár 1931-1944: az eredeti forgatókönyvből 1931 és 1944 között létrejött hazai mozgóképekről. Kráter, 2007.
- Pór, Katalin. De Budapest à Hollywood: le théâtre hongrois à Hollywood, 1930-1943. Presses universitaires de Rennes, 2010.
- Rîpeanu, Bujor. (ed.) International Directory of Cinematographers, Set- and Costume Designers in Film: Hungary (from the beginnings to 1988). Saur, 1981.
