= Sári Petráss =

Hungarian actor and singer (1888–1930)

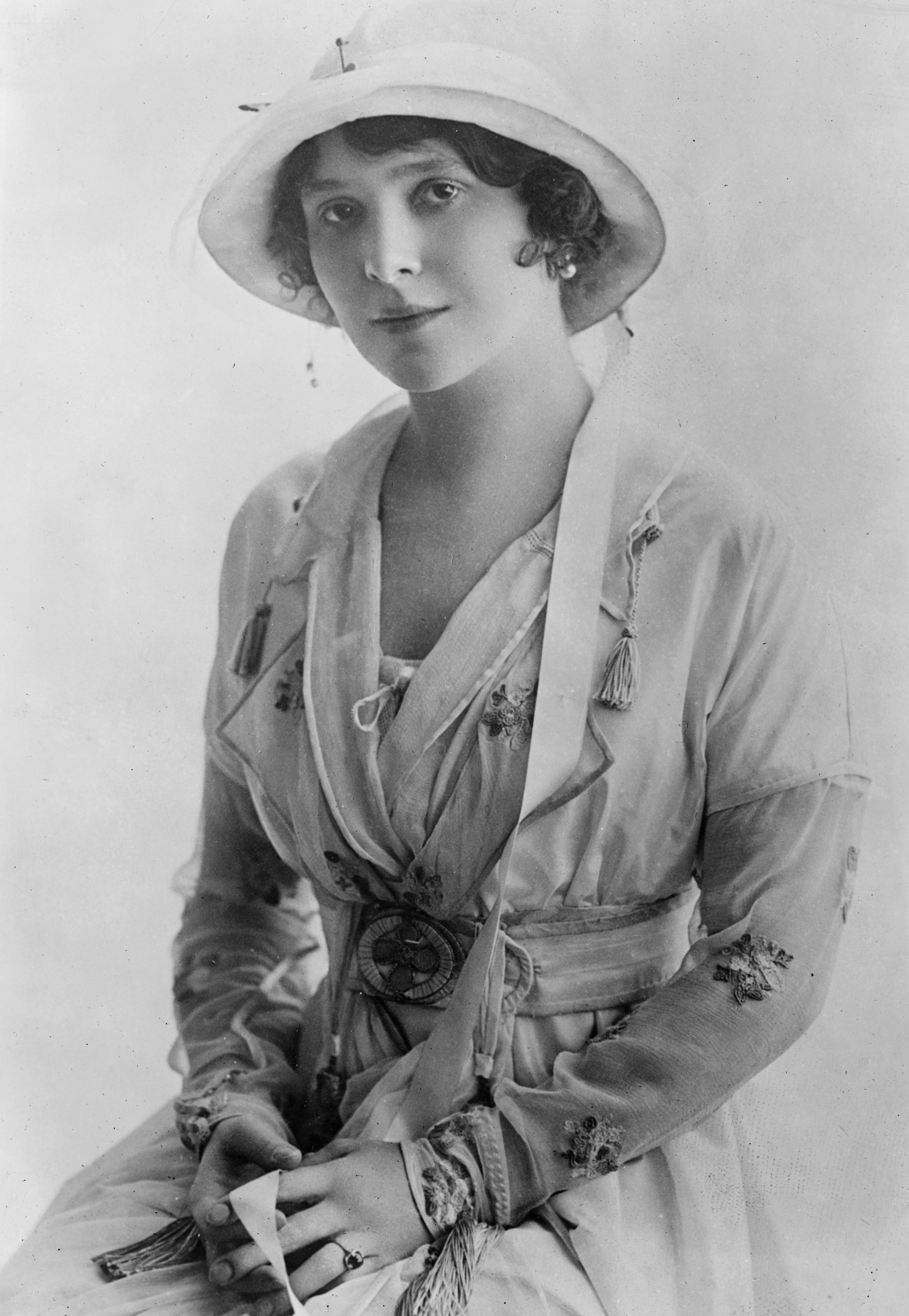
Sári Petráss

Sári Petráss (born Sarolta Petráss; 5 November 1888 – 9 September 1930) was a Hungarian operetta actress and singer. In the 1910s and 1920s, she played leading soprano parts in Budapest, Vienna, London and on Broadway. According to Richard Traubner, Sári Petráss and Sári Fedák remain "the two best-remembered Hungarian female operetta stars of all time."

== Biography ==
Petráss was born in Verőce, Hungary in 1888 and was a niece to Bertha von Suttner, countess Kinsky.

Petráss debuted in as a lead singer in November 1911 in Leányvásár along with Sári Fedák. The show produced at the Király Színház (King Theater), Budapest became an international hit as was instantly picked up by Carltheater in Vienna and by the English impresario George Edwardes. In 1912, Edwardes "imported" her and most of the original Budapest cast to London. Petráss quickly mastered singing in English and performed at the Daly's Theatre in Edwardes's English language version of Franz Lehár's Gipsy Love (1912) at Daly's Theatre, which ran 299 performances. She then performed at Daly's in The Marriage Market (1913) and in a revival of A Waltz Dream (1913), all with Gertie Millar and Robert Michaelis. Petráss was an expert horse rider, and rode a donkey called Jenny in the opening scenes of The Marriage Market.

In February 1916, the American media spread a rumour that Petráss had been executed in Budapest as a spy. Allegedly, after the outbreak of World War I she returned from England to Hungary to spy against the Central Powers for the British. The exact origin of the rumour is unknown; later it was confirmed that she indeed returned from England to Vienna and starred there in The Beautiful Unknown by Oscar Straus. William Boosey wrote that the London show of The Gipsy Princess with Petráss failed owing to cast selection, despite a "phenomenal run everywhere".

In late 1916, she settled in New York City and starred at the New Amsterdam Theatre. The New York Times praised her performance in the September 1916 premiere of Miss Springtime. The show was originally billed as Little Miss Springtime but A.L. Erlanger of New Amsterdam decided against "anything Little" by Emmerich Kálmán and Jerome Kern: "a prima donna new to these shores and destined to be a reigning favorite... in addition to her other talents, she is a clever actress. Miss Petrass is pretty and graceful and her voice, while not large, has a lovely quality and is used with great discretion."

A few days later Alexander Woollcott objected: "while Sári Petráss is an ingratiating and pretty vivacious prima donna, she can scarcely take first rank as a singer." In March 1917 Petráss married Felix Augustus Eugene Sommerhoff, a broker from Cedarhurst, New York. She soon withdrew from Miss Springtime and toured the United States with The Beautiful Unknown.

In 1921, Petráss reprised her role in The Gipsy Princess at the Prince of Wales Theatre, London.

Petráss and a friend, Lady Horne, were killed in an accident in Antwerp, Belgium on 9 September 1930. Their chauffeur, attempting to drive the car onto a ferry bound for Sainte Anne, was blinded by the beam of a lighthouse and crashed the car into the Scheldt. Both passengers drowned; Petráss was not identified until the next day. Sari Petráss was buried at Old Saint Mary's Church in Walmer, England.
