= The Marsh Flower =

1943 film

- Directed by: Dezső Ákos Hamza
- Written by: Ferenc Herczeg (play) Dezső Ákos Hamza; Péter Rákóczi
- Produced by: István Erdélyi
- Starring: Pál Jávor; Alice Fényes; Nusi Somogyi
- Cinematography: Barnabás Hegyi
- Music by: Sándor Szlatinay
- Production company: Kárpát Film
- Release date: 5 March 1943
- Running time: 97 minutes
- Country: Hungary
- Language: Hungarian

The Marsh Flower (Hungarian: A láp virága) is a 1943 Hungarian drama film directed by Dezső Ákos Hamza and starring Pál Jávor, Alice Fényes and Nusi Somogyi. The film's sets were designed by the art directors István Básthy and Sándor Iliszi.

== Cast ==
- Pál Jávor as Pálfalvy Miklós
- Alice Fényes as Jessy
- László Baksa Soós as Szentgróthy - Miklós barátja
- Lajos Boray as Mihályi Sándor - bankár
- Nusi Somogyi as Mihályiné
- Biri Szondy as Adél - Mihályiék lánya
- Ernö Mihályi as Frici - Jessy bátyja
- Sándor Pethes as Részeg vendég
- Pál Vessely as Részeg vendég
- Diana Clayton as Énekesnõ
- Samu Balázs as Rabinovitz - uzsorás
- Ferenc Antók as Vendég
- Ilona Dajbukát as Kocsmárosné
- Lenke Egyed as Fõbérlõ
- István Falussy as A kovácsoltvas-üzem vezetõje
- Lajos Gárday as Kelemen - kovács
- Károly Hajagos as Kaszinójátékos
- Gusztáv Harasztos as Szentgróthy ismerõse
- Sándor Hidassy as Elítélt
- Lajos Köpeczi Boócz as Másik fõpincér
- Gyula Köváry as Hegyi - az árus
- György Kürthy as Ügyvéd
- Antal Lédeczi as Börtönör
- Tibor Magyari as Pálfalvy inasa
- Gusztáv Pártos as Franci - fõpincér
- György Solthy as Herceg küldötte
- Sándor Solymossyas Részeg vendég
- Lajos Sugár as Péter - fõkomornyik
- Imre Toronyi as Pap
- Gusztáv Vándory as Kártyázó

== Bibliography ==
- Cunningham, John. Hungarian Cinema: From Coffee House to Multiplex. Wallflower Press, 2004.
- Juhász, István. Kincses magyar filmtár 1931-1944: az eredeti forgatókönyvből 1931 és 1944 között létrejött hazai mozgóképekről. Kráter, 2007.
- Rîpeanu, Bujor. (ed.) International Directory of Cinematographers, Set- and Costume Designers in Film: Hungary (from the beginnings to 1988). Saur, 1981.
