= Mother (1937 film) =

- Directed by: Johann von Vásáry
- Written by: Rezsö Török (play); Sári Fedák; Johann von Vásáry
- Produced by: János Smolka
- Starring: Sári Fedák; Jenő Pataky; Lia Szepes; Jenő Törzs
- Cinematography: István Eiben
- Edited by: Ferenc Vincze
- Music by: Dénes Buday; Jenő Sándor
- Production company: Budapest Film
- Release date: 19 November 1937
- Running time: 84 minutes
- Country: Hungary
- Language: Hungarian

Mother (Hungarian: Mámi) is a 1937 Hungarian comedy film directed by Johann von Vásáry and starring Sári Fedák, Jenő Pataky and Lia Szepes. The film was based on a play by Rezsö Török, with art direction by Márton Vincze. The arrival from Texas of an eccentric relative and her son, disrupt the rhythm of a wealthy Hungarian family.

The film is one of the successful comedies made by Vàsáry.

The film has been described as featuring one of the best roles of Sári Fedák.

== Cast ==
- Sári Fedák as Mámi, Özvegy Kovács Gáspárné
- Jenő Pataky as Kovács Gazsi
- Lia Szepes as Horváth Ilonka
- Jenő Törzs as Torday Henrik, bankvezér
- István Bársony as Inas
- Piri Vaszary as Torday nőrokona
- Andor Heltai as Cigányprímás
- Béla Mihályffi as Mr. Benedek
- Sándor Peti as Kárpáthi úr
- Annie Réthy as Benedek felesége
- Mary Vágó as Benedek lánya
