= Dezső Ákos Hamza =

Hungarian film director

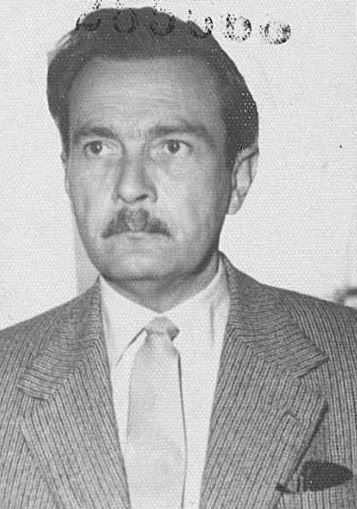
- Dezső Ákos Hamza, 1952
- Born: 1 September 1903; Hódmezővásárhely, Austria-Hungary
- Died: 16 May 1993 (aged 89); Jászberény, Hungary

Dezső Ákos Hamza (1 September 1903 – 16 May 1993) was a Hungarian film director. He directed more than ten films from 1941 to 1956.

== Selected filmography ==
Year	Title	Role	Notes
1938	The Lady Is a Bit Cracked	Producer	
1938	Man Sometimes Errs	Producer	
1939	Flower of the Tisza	Producer	
1939	Wildflowers of Gyimes	Producer	
1941	The Gyurkovics Boys	Director	
1942	I Am Guilty	Director	
1942	Sirius	Director	
1943	The Marsh Flower	Director	
1943	Suburban Guard Post	Director	
1943	Annamária	Director	
1944	Devil Rider	Director	
1944	Loving Hearts	Director	
1944	It Happened in Budapest	Director	
1944	Half a Boy	Director	
1950	Strano appuntamento	Director	
1956	Who Killed Anabela?	Director	
