= Siamese Cat (film) =

1943 Hungarian musical comedy film

- Directed by: László Kalmár
- Written by: László Kalmár
- Produced by: Miklós Szalontai Kiss
- Starring: Zita Szeleczky; Miklós Hajmássy; Tivadar Bilicsi
- Cinematography: Rudolf Icsey
- Edited by: Zoltán Kerényi
- Music by: Károly De Fries
- Production company: Hunnia Filmgyár
- Release date: 15 October 1943
- Running time: 86 minutes
- Country: Hungary
- Language: Hungarian

Siamese Cat (Hungarian: Sziámi macska) is a 1943 Hungarian musical comedy film directed by László Kalmár and starring Zita Szeleczky, Miklós Hajmássy and Tivadar Bilicsi. It was shot at the Hunnia Studios in Budapest. The film's sets were designed by the art director Klára B. Kokas.

== Synopsis ==
A nightclub singer pretends to be Siamese to make her act more interesting, and attracts the attention of man desperate to marry her.

== Cast ==
- Zita Szeleczky as Takács Manci / Siamese chanteuse
- Miklós Hajmássy as Pali
- Tivadar Bilicsi as Laci
- Mici Erdélyi as Hédi
- Zoltán Makláry as Mr. Takács
- Marcsa Simon as Mrs. Takács
- Géza Abonyi as Professor Sármány Aurél, orientalist
- Sándor Pethes as Egon
- Ibolya Bilinszky as Manageress
- Lajos Sugár as Waiter
- Lajos Hajmássy as Silk manufacturer
- István Lontay as Miska, bartender
- Tihamér Lázár as Lawyer, Laci and Pali's friend
- István Falussy as Asian specialist professor
- Károly Hajagos as Doorman at bar

== Bibliography ==
- Juhász, István. Kincses magyar filmtár 1931–1944: az eredeti forgatókönyvből 1931 és 1944 között létrejött hazai mozgóképekről. Kráter, 2007.
- Rîpeanu, Bujor. (ed.) International Directory of Cinematographers, Set- and Costume Designers in Film: Hungary (from the beginnings to 1988). Saur, 1981.
- Somlyódy, László & Somlyódy, Nóra. Hungarian Arts and Sciences: 1848–2000. Social Science Monographs, 2003.
