= Emilio Foriscot =

Spanish cinematographer

- Born: 5 December 1904; Muel, Zaragoza, Spain
- Died: 11 January 2001; Spain
- Occupation: Cinematographer
- Years active: 1935-1980 (film)

Emilio Foriscot (1904–2001) was a Spanish cinematographer. He worked on over a hundred film productions during his career.

== Selected filmography ==
- Heart of Gold (1941)
- We Thieves Are Honourable (1942)
- A Famous Gentleman (1943)
- The Guitar of Gardel (1949)
- The Troublemaker (1950)
- Forbidden Trade (1952)
- Persecution in Madrid (1952)
- Spanish Fantasy (1953)
- Daughter of the Sea (1953)
- Bronze and Moon (1953)
- It Happened in Seville (1955)
- Fountain of Trevi (1960)
- An American in Toledo (1960)
- The Two Rivals (1960)
- Stop at Tenerife (1964)
- Honeymoon, Italian Style (1966)
- Mutiny at Fort Sharpe (1966)
- Camerino Without a Folding Screen (1967)
- The Mark of the Wolfman (1968)
- Cry Chicago (1969)
- The Tigers of Mompracem (1970)
- May I Borrow Your Girl Tonight? (1978)

== Bibliography ==
- H. Mario Raimondo-Souto. Motion Picture Photography: A History, 1891–1960. McFarland, 2006.
