= It Happened in Budapest =

1944 film

- Directed by: Dezső Ákos Hamza
- Written by: György Dobos; Károly Nóti
- Produced by: István Kauser
- Starring: Lili Muráti; Miklós Hajmássy; Margit Ladomerszky
- Cinematography: István Eiben
- Edited by: Félix Máriássy
- Music by: Béla Dolecskó
- Production company: Délibáb Filmgyártó
- Release date: 5 June 1944
- Running time: 95 minutes
- Country: Hungary
- Language: Hungarian

It Happened in Budapest (Hungarian: Ez történt Budapesten) is a 1944 Hungarian comedy film directed by Dezső Ákos Hamza and starring Lili Muráti, Miklós Hajmássy and Margit Ladomerszky. The film's sets were designed by the art director Imre Sőrés.

== Cast ==
- Lili Muráti as Dr. Erzsébet Szikszay
- Miklós Hajmássy as Dr. István Orbói
- Margit Ladomerszky as Róza, wife of Elemér Pataky
- Manyi Kiss as Ilonka
- Gábor Rajnay as Elemér Pataky
- Zoltán Makláry as Berci, valet of Orbói
- Jenő Danis as Judge
- Ibolya Bilinszky as Manci, maid of Ilonka
- Kató Bors as Waitress
- Béla Dolecskó as Pianist
- Kató Fényes as Self – Singer
- György Gonda as Caretaker
- Edit Hlatky as Singer
- Hanna Landy as Katinka
- Livia Miklós as Singer
- György Nagyajtay as Husband of Katinka
- Gusztáv Pártos as Receptionist
- Erzsi Salamon as Singer

== Bibliography ==
- Juhász, István. Kincses magyar filmtár 1931-1944: az eredeti forgatókönyvből 1931 és 1944 között létrejött hazai mozgóképekről. Kráter, 2007.
- Rîpeanu, Bujor. (ed.) International Directory of Cinematographers, Set- and Costume Designers in Film: Hungary (from the beginnings to 1988). Saur, 1981.
- Virginás, Andrea. Film Genres in Hungarian and Romanian Cinema: History, Theory, and Reception. Rowman & Littlefield, 2021.
