= The Devil Doesn't Sleep =

1941 film

- Directed by: Viktor Bánky
- Written by: Gábor Vaszary
- Produced by: Ernö Gottesmann
- Starring: Klári Tolnay; Gyula Csortos; Miklós Hajmássy
- Cinematography: Barnabás Hegyi
- Edited by: László Katonka
- Music by: Ottó Vincze
- Production company: Magyar Film Iroda
- Release date: 16 October 1941
- Running time: 97 minutes
- Country: Hungary
- Language: Hungarian

The Devil Doesn't Sleep (Hungarian: Az ördög nem alszik) is a 1941 Hungarian comedy film directed by Viktor Bánky and starring Klári Tolnay, Gyula Csortos and Miklós Hajmássy. It was shot at the Hunnia Studios in Budapest. The film's sets were designed by the art directors István Básthy and Sándor Iliszi.

== Synopsis ==
A count plans to leave his country estate to his two surviving relatives. He invites them to his castle, hoping that they will marry and therefore the estate will not be divided when he dies. However, from their first meeting, the two do not get on.

== Cast ==
- Klári Tolnay as Éva
- Gyula Csortos as Gróf Boroghy Gedeon
- Miklós Hajmássy as Péter
- Béla Mihályffi as Gergely, jogtanácsos
- Ilonka Szép as Klári
- László Pálóczi as Péter barátja
- Nándor Bihary as Viktor, ügyvéd
- Miklós Pataki as Inas
- Ilona Dajbukát as Vendéglõsné
- Erzsi Bata as Szobalány
- József Juhász as Vendéglõs
- Jenö Danis as János bácsi
- György Gonda as Paraszt
- Gyula Szöreghy as Paraszt

== Bibliography ==
- Juhász, István. Kincses magyar filmtár 1931-1944: az eredeti forgatókönyvből 1931 és 1944 között létrejött hazai mozgóképekről. Kráter, 2007.
- Rîpeanu, Bujor. (ed.) International Directory of Cinematographers, Set- and Costume Designers in Film: Hungary (from the beginnings to 1988). Saur, 1981.
