= Beautiful Star (1942 film) =

1942 film

- Directed by: Imre Jelinek
- Written by: Zsigmond Móricz (novel); Ferenc Jankovich
- Produced by: István Beszedits
- Starring: Alice Fényes; Gerő Mály; Antal Páger
- Cinematography: Rudolf Icsey
- Music by: Tibor Polgár
- Production company: Pegazus Film
- Release date: 25 December 1942
- Running time: 95 minutes
- Country: Hungary
- Language: Hungarian

Beautiful Star (Hungarian: Szép csillag) is a 1942 Hungarian drama film directed by Imre Jelinek and starring Alice Fényes, Gerő Mály and Antal Páger. It is based on a novel by Zsigmond Móricz. The film's sets were designed by the art director Imre Sőrés.

== Cast ==
- Alice Fényes as Dea
- Gerö Mály as Intézõ
- Antal Páger as Avar János
- Ilona Kökény as Grófné
- Lajos Bakay as Antal gróf, Dea võlegénye
- Judit Székely as Róza
- Erzsébet Medgyesy as Avarné
- Lajos Alszeghy as Vidracsek
- Jenö Bodnár as Plébános
- Mária Csiky as Juliska
- György Kürthy as Gróf
- József Pataky as Öreg Avar
- Lajos Sugár as Gádmány András
- Ferenc Szabó as Erdõõr
- Róbert Huszthy
- Lajos Rajczy

== Bibliography ==
- Juhász, István. Kincses magyar filmtár 1931-1944: az eredeti forgatókönyvből 1931 és 1944 között létrejött hazai mozgóképekről. Kráter, 2007.
- Rîpeanu, Bujor. (ed.) International Directory of Cinematographers, Set- and Costume Designers in Film: Hungary (from the beginnings to 1988). Saur, 1981.
