= Klára B. Kokas =

Hungarian art director

- Born: 31 December 1907; Kremnica, Austro-Hungarian Empire
- Died: 31 October 1962 (aged 54); Córdoba, Argentina
- Occupations: Art director, Costume Designer, Producer
- Years active: 1935–1944 (film)

Klára B. Kokas (31 December 1907 – 31 October 1962) was a Hungarian art director and costume designer. During the Horthy era she was active designing setss and costumes for the Hungarian film industry and theatre. She also produced several films in the 1940s. Following the end of the Second World War she emigrated to Italy and then settled in Argentina where she opened a ceramics factory.

== Selected filmography ==
- Everybody Loves Someone Else (1940)
- Gül Baba (1940)
- Matthew Arranges Things (1940)
- Queen Elizabeth (1940)
- Sirius (1942)
- I Am Guilty (1942)
- Magdolna (1942)
- Annamária (1943)
- Suburban Guard Post (1943)
- Siamese Cat (1943)
- Hungarian Eagles (1944)
- Masterless Woman (1944)

== Bibliography ==
- Laura, Ernesto G. Tutti i film di Venezia, 1932–1984. La Biennale, Settore cinema e spettacolo televisivo, 1985.
- Rîpeanu, Bujor. (ed.) International Directory of Cinematographers, Set- and Costume Designers in Film: Hungary (from the beginnings to 1988). Saur, 1981.
