= After the Storm (1945 film) =

1945 film directed by József Daróczy

- Directed by: József Daróczy
- Written by: Gábor Thurzó
- Produced by: József Daróczy
- Starring: Tivadar Uray; Alice Fényes; Sándor Szabó
- Cinematography: István Eiben
- Edited by: Zoltán Kerényi
- Music by: Ottó Vincze
- Production company: Hajdu Film
- Release date: 27 October 1945
- Running time: 82 minutes
- Country: Hungary
- Language: Hungarian

After the Storm (Hungarian: Vihar után) is a 1945 Hungarian drama film directed by József Daróczy and starring Tivadar Uray, Alice Fényes and Sándor Szabó. Production commenced in 1944, but it was not released until after the end of the Second World War. It was shot at the Hunnia Studios in Budapest. The film's sets were designed by the art director László Dudás.

== Cast ==
- Tivadar Uray as Tamás Péter karmester
- Alice Fényes as Judit, Tamás Péter felesége
- Ferenc Pákozdy as ifj. Tamás Péter
- Sándor Szabó as Bordás Géza
- Gyula Kamarás as Sándorházy
- Margit Ladomerszky as Mimi
- Hanna Landy as Piri
- Sándor Pethes as Cingár
- Lajos Alszeghy as Vendég Tamásnál
- Nándor Bihary as vendég Tamáséknál
- Jenö Danis as Ajtónálló a Zeneakadémián
- Pál Vessely as Taxisofõr
- György Gonda as Rendõrjárõr
- Gyula Ignáth as Impresszárió
- Lajos Kelemen as Kocsmavendég
- Gyula Köváry as Kocsmavendég
- György Kürthy as Rendõrkapitány
- Tihamér Lázár as Egy úr a trafikban
- János Makláry as Rendõrbiztos
- László Misoga as Kocsmavendég
- György Nagyajtay as Vendég Tamáséknál
- László Pálóczi as Ferenc
- Ferenc Szabó as Trafikban újságot olvasó férfi
- Zoltán Szakáts as Rendõrfogalmazó
- Andor Sárossy as Hordár
- Lajos Vértes as Vendég Tamáséknál

== Bibliography ==
- Cunningham, John. Hungarian Cinema: From Coffee House to Multiplex. Wallflower Press, 2004.
- Rîpeanu, Bujor. (ed.) International Directory of Cinematographers, Set- and Costume Designers in Film: Hungary (from the beginnings to 1988). Saur, 1981.
