= Europe Doesn't Answer =

1941 film

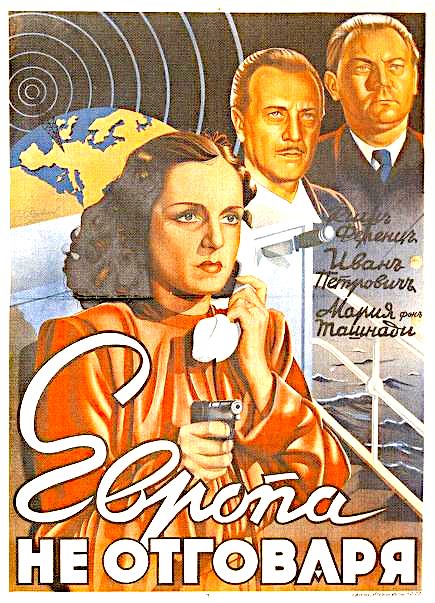
- A foreign release poster
- Directed by: Géza von Radványi
- Written by: Géza von Radványi
- Produced by: László Sipos
- Starring: Maria von Tasnady; Iván Petrovich; Ferenc Kiss
- Cinematography: Rudolf Icsey
- Edited by: László Katonka
- Music by: Szabolcs Fényes
- Production company: Atelier Film
- Release date: 19 March 1941
- Running time: 93 minutes
- Country: Hungary
- Language: Hungarian

Europe Doesn't Answer (Hungarian: Európa nem válaszol) is a 1941 Hungarian spy thriller film directed by Géza von Radványi and starring Maria von Tasnady, Iván Petrovich and Ferenc Kiss. The film's sets were designed by the art directors János Horváth and Sándor Iliszi.

== Synopsis ==
In August 1939, shortly before the outbreak of World War II, a luxury liner leaves New York for Europe. Onboard is a secret agent Maria Holm, carrying important documents to her superiors. Amongst her fellow passengers is an enemy spy.

== Cast ==
- Maria von Tasnady as Maria Holm
- Iván Petrovich as Vincent Gordon
- Ferenc Kiss as Kapitány
- Ilona Titkos as Gloria King
- Miklós Hajmássy as Gloria titkára
- Gerö Mály as Matematikaprofesszor
- Piroska Vaszary as Penelopé - A Matematikaprofesszor Felesége
- Kálmán Rózsahegyi as János bácsi, amerikás magyar
- Artúr Somlay as Van Gulden - Milliomos
- Emmi Buttykay as Van Gulden barátnõje
- Ferenc Táray as Nemo kapitány - bûvész
- Zoltán Greguss as Olivera
- Béla Mihályffi as Orvos
- Béla Fáy as Tiszt
- Miklós Gábor as Karmester
- Gyula Benkö as Zenész
- Cheo Morejón as Néger utas
- Géza Berczy as Zenész
- Ferenc Pethes as Zenész
- Gyula Szöreghy as Zenész
- Géza Halász as Zenész
- Tibor Puskás as újságíró
- Ilonka Szép as Szobalány
- Sándor Naszódy as Zenész
- Gyula Zordon as Távírász
- István Károlyi as Rendör
- Lajos Bakay as Zenész
- Alice Fényes as Extra

== Bibliography ==
- Juhász, István. Kincses magyar filmtár 1931-1944: az eredeti forgatókönyvből 1931 és 1944 között létrejött hazai mozgóképekről. Kráter, 2007.
- Rîpeanu, Bujor. (ed.) International Directory of Cinematographers, Set- and Costume Designers in Film: Hungary (from the beginnings to 1988). Saur, 1981.
