= Strano appuntamento =

- Directed by: Dezső Ákos Hamza
- Screenplay by: Anton Giulio Majano
- Story by: Vittorio Calvino
- Starring: Umberto Spadaro
- Cinematography: Marco Scarpelli
- Music by: Angelo Francesco Lavagnino
- Release date: 1951
- Country: Italy
- Language: Italian

Strano appuntamento is a 1951 Italian film directed by Dezső Ákos Hamza.

== Cast ==
- Umberto Spadaro ... Rossi
- Leda Gloria ... Signora Rossi
- Rossana Podestà ... Their daughter
- Enzo Staiola ... Older son (as Enzo Stajola)
- Stefano Guarnieri ... Younger son
- Marina Bonfigli
- Clelia Matania
- Olga Solbelli
- Gianni Musy (as Gianni Glori)
- Enrico Glori
- Carlo Romano
- Gianna Pacetti
- Clara Auteri Pepe
- Zoe Incrocci
- Oscar Andriani
