= Roses from the South (1934 film) =

1934 film

- Directed by: Walter Janssen
- Written by: Hans Vietzke; Max Wallner
- Produced by: Erich Schicker; Karl Schulz; Robert Wüllner
- Starring: Paul Hörbiger; Gretl Theimer; Rózsi Csikós
- Cinematography: Willy Winterstein
- Edited by: Ludolf Grisebach
- Music by: Ernst Erich Buder
- Production companies: Schulz & Wuellner Filmfabrikation
- Release date: 30 August 1934
- Running time: 93 minutes
- Country: Germany
- Language: German

Roses from the South (German: Rosen aus dem Süden) is a 1934 German historical musical film directed by Walter Janssen and starring Paul Hörbiger, Gretl Theimer and Rózsi Csikós. Location shooting took place around Vienna. The film's sets were designed by the art directors Wilhelm Depenau and Erich Zander. It is an operetta film, a popular genre during the decade. The title references the waltz of the same title composed by Johann Strauss.

== Synopsis ==
Johann Strauss comes to the rescue of a struggling Viennese wine merchant and his attractive daughter by turning up to conduct the orchestra at a party and saving the family business from ruin.

== Cast ==
- Paul Hörbiger as Johann Strauß
- Hugo Werner-Kahle as Johannes Brahms
- Oscar Sabo as Gustav Mödlinger, Weingroßhändler
- Olga Limburg as Sophie Mödlinger
- Ekkehard Arendt as Toni Mödlinger
- Oskar Sima as Eduard Weingruber, Oberkellner
- Gretl Theimer as Mizzi, seine Tochter
- Rózsi Csikós as Roszi
- Carl Ehrhardt-Hardt as Poldi Wambacher
- Hans Junkermann as Generalkonsul Füßli
- Henry Lorenzen as Ein Tanzmeister
- Johanna Ewald as Frau Krause
- Otto Sauter-Sarto as Peppi, ein Pratersänger
- Hans Hermann Schaufuß as Herr Krause
- Elisabeth von Ruets as Baronin
- Hugo Flink as Graf Lichtenstein
- Emil Biron as Baron von Stessel

== Reception ==
It was distributed in America by Casino Film Exchange in 1935 and a New York Times review considered it "bound to please Yorkville audiences or any other listeners familiar with the German tongue and its variations".

== Bibliography ==
- Kater, Michael H. & Riethmüller Albrecht . Music and Nazism: Art Under Tyranny, 1933-1945. Laaber, 2003.
- Waldman, Harry. Nazi Films in America, 1933–1942. McFarland, 2008.
