= You Are the Song =

1940 film

- Directed by: Endre Rodríguez
- Written by: Alfréd Deésy; Sándor Nagymihály
- Produced by: Péter Bajusz
- Starring: János Sárdy; Imre Toronyi; Piroska Vaszary
- Cinematography: Rudolf Icsey
- Edited by: László Katonka
- Music by: Béla Dolecskó
- Production company: Turul Film
- Release date: 3 June 1940
- Running time: 77 minutes
- Country: Hungary
- Language: Hungarian

You Are the Song (Hungarian: Te vagy a dal) is a 1940 Hungarian drama film directed by Endre Rodríguez and starring János Sárdy, Imre Toronyi and Piroska Vaszary. It was shot at the Hunnia Studios in Budapest. The film's sets were designed by the art director József Simoncsics.

== Cast ==
- János Sárdy as Nádas Péter
- Imre Toronyi as Selmeczy, énektanár
- Klári Paulay as Éva, Selmeczy lánya
- Piroska Vaszary as Szakácsnõ
- Kamill Feleki as Szobafestõ
- László Misoga as Szobafestõ
- Béla Mihályffi as Orvosprofesszor
- Gyula Köváry as Idõs zeneszerzõ
- Béla Fáy as Fiatal zeneszerzõ
- Vera Sennyei as Lívia
- Piri Ádám as Dizõz
- Dániel Skultéty as Müller úr, énektanár tanítványa
- József Tóth-Vásárhelyi as Pincér

== Bibliography ==
- Rîpeanu, Bujor. (ed.) International Directory of Cinematographers, Set- and Costume Designers in Film: Hungary (from the beginnings to 1988). Saur, 1981.
