= A Message from the Volga Shore =

1942 film

- Directed by: Alfréd Deésy
- Written by: József Babay; Alfréd Deésy
- Produced by: István Erdélyi
- Starring: János Sárdy; Júlia Tóth; József Bihari
- Cinematography: Ferenc Fekete; László Tubay
- Edited by: László Katonka
- Music by: Dénes Buday
- Production company: Kárpát Film
- Release date: 14 December 1942
- Running time: 70 minutes
- Country: Hungary
- Language: Hungarian

A Message from the Volga Shore (Hungarian: Üzenet a Volgapartról) is a 1942 Hungarian war drama film directed by Alfréd Deésy and starring János Sárdy, Júlia Tóth and József Bihari. It was shot at the Hunnia Studios in Budapest. The film's sets were designed by the art director István Básthy and Sándor Iliszi.

== Cast ==
- János Sárdy as Vihar András
- Júlia Tóth as Barna Zsuzsi
- József Bihari as Tanító úr
- Margit Vágóné as András nagyanyja
- Ferenc Pethes as Kisbíró
- Hilda Gobbi as Zsuzsi anyja
- Endre C. Turáni as Barna János
- Erzsébet Alberty d'Enno as Tatjána
- Lajos Rajczy as Bakony István
- Lenke Egyed as Bakony anyja
- Jenö Bodnár as Barna Bálin
- Lajos Köpeczi Boócz as Vihar János, András nagybátyja
- Sándor Naszódy as Szittya Péter
- Dóra Fáy Kiss as Parasztlány
- Elek Bognár as Rádiós

== Bibliography ==
- Juhász, István. Kincses magyar filmtár 1931–1944: az eredeti forgatókönyvből 1931 és 1944 között létrejött hazai mozgóképekről. Kráter, 2007.
- Rîpeanu, Bujor. (ed.) International Directory of Cinematographers, Set- and Costume Designers in Film: Hungary (from the beginnings to 1988). Saur, 1981.
