= Changing the Guard (film) =

1942 film

- Directed by: Viktor Bánky
- Written by: Miklós Tóth
- Starring: Antal Páger; Gyula Csortos; Valéria Hidvéghy; Margit Ladomerszky
- Cinematography: Barnabás Hegyi
- Edited by: László Katonka
- Music by: Ottó Vincze
- Production company: Mester Film
- Release date: 18 August 1942
- Running time: 91 minutes
- Country: Hungary
- Language: Hungarian

Changing the Guard (Hungarian: Örségváltás) is a 1942 Hungarian drama film directed by Viktor Bánky and starring Antal Páger, Gyula Csortos and Valéria Hidvéghy. It was the second of two films with overtly nationalistic themes that Bánky and Páger made in 1942. The previous film Dr. Kovács István had dealt with similar issues in Hungarian society. It was shot at the Hunnia Studios in Budapest. The film's sets were designed by the art directors István Básthy and Sándor Iliszi.

== Synopsis ==
A talented young engineer is frustrated by the reactionary management of his factory who constantly overlook him. Eventually his talent is recognised by the authorities and he is appointed to run the factory and clear out the old guard.

== Cast ==
- Antal Páger as Takács Péter
- Gyula Csortos as Kály Zsiga
- Valéria Hidvéghy as Marianna, Kályék lánya
- Dezső Kertész as Zubiczky
- Margit Ladomerszky as Kályné
- Zoltán Makláry as Vargha bácsi
- Béla Mihályffi as Szegõ Lipót
- Zoltán Szakáts as Bajkó László
- Mariska Vízváry as Pepi néni
- Nándor Bihary as Fodor
- Jenö Danis as Ferenc, altiszt
- Béla Fáy as Kallós
- Irén Pelsöczy as Szepesy testvére
- Vera Szemere as Magda, Bajkó felesége
- Béla Vizi as Gróf Szepesy Miklós

== Bibliography ==
- Cunningham, John. Hungarian Cinema: From Coffee House to Multiplex. Wallflower Press, 2004.
