= Ilus Vay =

Hungarian actress (1923–2008)

- Born: Ilona Horváth; 20 February 1923; Budapest, Hungary
- Died: 28 October 2008 (aged 85); Budapest, Hungary
- Occupation: Actress
- Years active: 1938–2008

Ilus Vay (born Ilona Horváth; February 1923 – 28 October 2008) was a Hungarian actress. She died on 28 October 2008 at the age of 85 in Budapest.

== Filmography ==
- Jómadár (in the role of Cake shop assistant) – 1943
- Anyámasszony katonája (in the role of Éva) – 1943
- The Night Serenade (in the role of Governess of the Pallay daughters) – 1943
- Hungarian Eagles – 1944
- A vadon fia – 1944
- Mickey Magnate – 1948
- A város alatt – 1953
- Dollárpapa – 1956
- Két vallomás – 1957
- Házasságból elégséges – 1960
- Mit csinált Felséged 3-tól 5-ig? (The Women of Szelistye) (in the role of a woman of Szelistye) – 1964
- Özvegy menyasszonyok (Widowed Brides) (in the role of Nurse Jusztínia) – 1964
- Sok hűség semmiért – 1966
- Alfa Romeó és Júlia – 1968
- A Halhatatlan légiós – 1971
- Lila ákác (Purple Lilacs) – 1972
- Az 1001. kilométer – 1973
- Kínai kancsó – 1974
- Süsü, a sárkány kalandjai (Süsü, the Dragon) (Youth Puppet TV Series) – 1976 (voice)
- Akli Miklós – 1986
- A három testőr Afrikában (The Three Musketeers in Africa) (in the role of Leila) – 1996
- Szomszédok – 1997
- Egy bolond százat csinál (One fool makes a hundred) (in the role of Margitka) – 2006
