= János Sárdy =

Hungarian actor

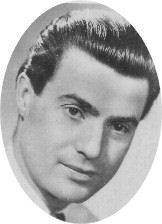
- Born: 27 July 1907; Nagykónyi, Austro-Hungarian Empire
- Died: 9 March 1969 (aged 61); Budapest, Hungary
- Occupations: Actor, Singer
- Years active: 1940–1951 (film)

János Sárdy (1907–1969) was a Hungarian opera singer and film actor. He frequently starred in films featuring his characters being lifted out of poverty by their natural talent at singing.

== Selected filmography ==
- You Are the Song (1940)
- The Marriage Market (1941)
- The Last Song (1942)
- Magdolna (1942)
- A Message from the Volga Shore (1942)
- The Night Serenade (1943)
- The Song of Rákóczi (1943)
- Dream Waltz (1943)
- Boy or Girl? (1944)
- Mickey Magnate (1949)
- Déryné (1951)

== Bibliography ==
- Bolton, Lucy & Wright Julie Lobalzo (ed.) Lasting Screen Stars: Images that Fade and Personas that Endure. Springer, 2016.
