= Gusztáv Pártos =

Hungarian actor (1895–1951)

- Born: August 18, 1895
- Died: March 22, 1951 (aged 55); Budapest, Hungarian People's Republic
- Occupation: Actor

Gusztáv Pártos (18 August 1895, Pusztaszentbenedek – 22 March 1951, Budapest) was a Hungarian actor.

== Selected filmography ==
- Lord Arthur Saville's Crime (1920)
- The Black Captain (1920)
- Arsene Lupin's Last Adventure (1922)
- The Private Life of Helen of Troy (1927)
- Lonesome (1928)
- Vamping Venus (1928)
- Night Watch (1928)
- Close Harmony (1929)
- The Last Performance (1929)
- Stolen Wednesday (1933)
- Villa for Sale (1935)
- Budapest Pastry Shop (1935)
- Miss President (1935)
- Thanks for Knocking Me Down (1935)
- Rosemary (1938)
- The Bercsenyi Hussars (1940)
- Duel for Nothing (1940)
- Semmelweis (1940)
- Entry Forbidden (1941)
- I Am Guilty (1942)
- Mountain Girl (1942)
- Sirius (1942)
- Disillusion (1943)
- Mouse in the Palace (1943)
- Suburban Guard Post (1943)
- The Marsh Flower (1943)
- Loving Hearts (1944)
- African Bride (1944)
- Devil Rider (1944)
- It Happened in Budapest (1944)
