= Sári Fedák =

Hungarian actress and singer (1879-1955)

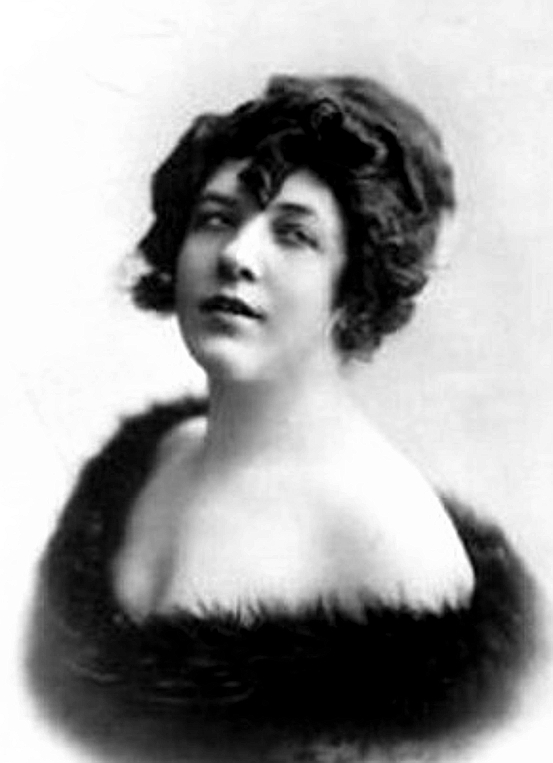
- Fedák, c. 1925
- Born: Sarolta Klára Mária Fedák; September 27, 1879; Beregszász, Austria-Hungary
- Died: May 5, 1955 (aged 75); Budapest, Hungary
- Years active: 1912–1941
- Spouse: Ferenc Molnár (m. 1922–1925)

Sári Fedák (born Sarolta Klára Mária Fedák; 27 September 1879, in Beregszász, Hungary (now Berehove, Ukraine – 5 May 1955, in Budapest, Hungary) was a Hungarian actress and singer, one of the most well-known prima donnas of her time. According to American journalist and non-fiction writer Richard Traubner, Fedák and Sári Petráss remain "the two best-remembered Hungarian female operetta stars of all time".

== Life ==
She studied acting with Szidi Rákosi until 1899, beginning her career the same year with the Magyar Színház theatre company. Beginning in 1900 she played in Pozsony (now Bratislava), and in several theatres in Budapest, including Népszínház, Király Színház, and Vígszínház. Following World War I, she spoke out against the Austro-Hungarian monarchy. Later, during the Hungarian Council Republic, she participated as a performer in the May Day events aimed at recruitment for the Red Army.

After the fall of the Republic, Fedák fled to Vienna, but was captured and held in prison at Wiener Neustadt for a short time. As she supported the Republic, she could play in only Vienna from 1920 to 1921. She made appearances in Berlin and Paris in 1921 and 1925. In 1934, she toured several American cities.

== Residence ==
In 1916/1917, Fedák purchased the Biehn Villa at 24 Gyöngyvirág Street in the Villatelep district of Pestszentlőrinc (now Lónyaytelep, part of Budapest) from János Biehn for her parents. From September 1929, she also lived in the villa herself, becoming a permanent resident of Pestszentlőrinc. She subsequently became involved in local social and political life. In addition to holding virilis status, which entitled her to participate in municipal affairs on the basis of her tax contributions, she was elected president of the local women’s organisation of the National Unity Party (In hungarian: Nemzeti Egység Pártja) in 1934. She held the position until late November 1935.

In 1938, Fedák had the villa demolished, subdivided the garden plot into smaller parcels, and sold the resulting lots. Although the building no longer survives, recent research and field surveys in the district have identified architectural elements in older houses that may have originated from the former villa, including tiled stoves, doors, and windows.

== Personal life ==
In 1922 she married writer Ferenc Molnár, after a six-year relationship. The couple divorced in 1925 or 1926, after "he had accused her of intimacy with 42 gentlemen, and she had replied in kind with a list of 142 ladies".

In 1923, she became a member of the Fővárosi Operettszínház theatre. Starting in 1940, she was the leading actress in the Új Magyar Színház theatre. In 1944, working at the Donausender radio station in Vienna, she rallied for Hungary to continue the fight in World War II on the side of Nazi Germany and was sentenced to eight months in prison after the war. She was also banned from playing in theatres for three years. She never appeared on stage again. After being released from prison, she moved to Nyáregyháza, retiring from active life. She died in 1955, aged 75, and was interred in Budapest's Farkasréti Cemetery.

== Selected filmography ==
- Miss Iza (1933)
- Mother (1937)
- On the Way Home (1940)

== Sources ==
- - Sári Fedák in the Hungarian Theatrical Lexicon (György, Székely. Magyar Színházművészeti Lexikon. Budapest: Akadémiai Kiadó, 1994; ISBN 978-963-05-6635-3), freely available on mek.oszk.hu (in Hungarian)
- Tibor, Bános . Aki szelet vet. Budapest:Magvető 1986.
