= István Básthy =

Hungarian art director

- Born: 21 March 1896; Budapest, Austro-Hungarian Empire
- Died: 1 March 1970 (aged 73); Budapest, Hungary
- Occupation: Art director
- Years active: 1923–1964 (film)

István Básthy (1896–1970) was a Hungarian art director. He designed the sets for more than fifty productions in the Hungarian film industry, frequently working alongside Sándor Iliszi. His career spanned from the silent era during the 1920s to the 1960s during the Communist era. Along with Marton Vincze he was one of the most prolific set designers in Hungary.

== Selected filmography ==
- Stars of Eger (1923)
- Rongyosok (1926)
- The Chequered Coat (1940)
- Much Ado About Emmi (1940)
- Money Talks (1940)
- Seven Plum Trees (1940)
- The Unquiet Night (1940)
- Castle in Transylvania (1940)
- The Bercsenyi Hussars (1940)
- Entry Forbidden (1941)
- The Marriage Market (1941)
- The Devil Doesn't Sleep (1941)
- Let's Love Each Other (1941)
- Three Bells (1941)
- Changing the Guard (1942)
- The Talking Robe (1942)
- A Message from the Volga Shore (1942)
- Guard House Number 5 (1942)
- The Marsh Flower (1943)
- Mouse in the Palace (1943)
- Rózsa Nemes (1943)
- Disillusion (1943)
- It Begins with Marriage (1943)
- Strange Roads (1944)
- Dani (1957)
- Danse Macabre (1958)
- Crime at Dawn (1960)

== Bibliography ==
- Bolton, Lucy & Wright Julie Lobalzo (ed.) Lasting Screen Stars: Images that Fade and Personas that Endure. Springer, 2016.
- Laura, Ernesto G. Tutti i film di Venezia, 1932–1984. La Biennale, Settore cinema e spettacolo televisivo, 1985.
