= The Last of the Vereczkeys =

1940 film

- Directed by: Sándor Szlatinay
- Written by: Attila Orbók; János Zalabéri Horváth
- Produced by: Ernõ Teichmann
- Starring: Zita Szeleczky; Miklós Hajmássy; Valéria Hidvéghy
- Cinematography: Rudolf Icsey
- Edited by: Zoltán Farkas
- Music by: Sándor Szlatinay
- Production company: Standard Film
- Distributed by: Filmértékesítõ
- Release date: 31 January 1940
- Running time: 81 minutes
- Country: Hungary
- Language: Hungarian

The Last of the Vereczkeys (Hungarian: Az utolsó Vereczkey) is a 1940 Hungarian drama film directed by Sándor Szlatinay and starring Zita Szeleczky, Miklós Hajmássy and Valéria Hidvéghy. It was shot at the Hunnia Studios in Budapest. The film's sets were designed by the art directors Sándor Iliszi and József Simoncsics.

== Synopsis ==
Erzsi Vereczkey controls a struggling shipping company, but discovers in the family bible clues that suggest that the family treasures are hidden away in a castle. She sets out to find them.

== Cast ==
- Zita Szeleczky as Vereczkey Erzsi
- Miklós Hajmássy as Miklóssy István
- Valéria Hidvéghy as Bébi
- Tivadar Bilicsi as Tímár
- Piroska Vaszary as Katalin
- Gyula Csortos as Ferenc
- György Kürthy as Miklóssy Tamás
- Karola Zala as Miklóssy Tamásné
- Margit Ladomerszky as Wereczkeyné
- Gyözö Kabók as Parasztember
- Etelka Dán as Gépírónõ
- László Misoga as Pincér
- Gizi Hernády as Gépírókisasszony
- Dezsö Szalóky as Szabó úr, Concordia irodában tisztviselõ
- Ilonka Szép as Titkárnö
- György Gonda as Kocsis
- Lajos Kelemen
- István Saághy
- Kató Timár
- György Ungváry
- Gyula Kompóthy
- Kitty K. Tóth
- Róbert Huszthy
- Dezsõ Bárdy
- Gyula Zordon as Igazgató úr

== Bibliography ==
- Juhász, István. Kincses magyar filmtár 1931-1944: az eredeti forgatókönyvből 1931 és 1944 között létrejött hazai mozgóképekről. Kráter, 2007.
- Rîpeanu, Bujor. (ed.) International Directory of Cinematographers, Set- and Costume Designers in Film: Hungary (from the beginnings to 1988). Saur, 1981.
