= Barnabás Hegyi =

Hungarian cinematographer

- Born: 4 March 1914; Zboró, Austria-Hungary
- Died: 28 April 1966 (aged 52); Budapest, Hungary
- Occupation: Cinematographer
- Years active: 1934–1966 (film)

Barnabás Hegyi (1914–1966) was a Hungarian cinematographer. He worked on around a hundred films, beginning his career in the Horthy era and continuing into post-war Communist Hungary. He is noted for his cinematography on the 1948 film Somewhere in Europe.

== Selected filmography ==
- The Chequered Coat (1940)
- Entry Forbidden (1941)
- The Marriage Market (1941)
- The Devil Doesn't Sleep (1941)
- Three Bells (1941)
- Let's Love Each Other (1941)
- Dr. Kovács István (1942)
- Guard House Number 5 (1942)
- Changing the Guard (1942)
- The Talking Robe (1942)
- Time of Trial (1942)
- We'll Know By Midnight (1942)
- The Marsh Flower (1943)
- Disillusion (1943)
- Mouse in the Palace (1943)
- The Night Girl (1943)
- Together (1943)
- Quite a Lad (1943)
- It Begins with Marriage (1943)
- Devil Rider (1944)
- Strange Roads (1944)
- Song of the Cornfields (1947)
- Somewhere in Europe (1948)
- Hot Fields (1949)
- Gala Suit (1949)
- A Woman Gets a Start (1949)
- Singing Makes Life Beautiful (1950)
- Full Steam Ahead (1951)
- A Strange Marriage (1951)
- The Sea Has Risen (1953)
- Fourteen Lives (1954)
- Accident (1955)
- Merry-Go-Round (1956)
- Dani (1957)
- Fever (1957)
- At Midnight (1957)
- Don Juan's Last Adventure (1958)
- The Smugglers (1958)
- Yesterday (1959)
- A Husband for Susy (1960)
- Alba Regia (1961)
- The Man Who Doesn't Exist (1964)
- Car Crazy (1965)

== Bibliography ==
- Burns, Bryan. World Cinema: Hungary. Fairleigh Dickinson University Press, 1996.
- Cunningham, John. Hungarian Cinema: From Coffee House to Multiplex. Wallflower Press, 2004.
- Luhr, William. World Cinema Since 1945. Ungar, 1987.
