= Wildfire (1944 film) =

1944 film

- Directed by: Zoltán Farkas
- Written by: György Patkós; Ilonka Szabó
- Produced by: Péter Bajusz
- Starring: Ilonka Szabó; László Szilassy; Vera Szemere
- Cinematography: Rudolf Icsey
- Edited by: Mária Vály
- Music by: Ottó Vincze
- Production company: Bajusz Film
- Release date: 30 March 1944
- Running time: 82 minutes
- Country: Hungary
- Language: Hungarian

Wildfire (Hungarian: Futótüz) is a 1944 Hungarian historical drama film directed by Zoltán Farkas and starring Ilonka Szabó, László Szilassy and Vera Szemere. It was shot at the Hunnia Studios in Budapest with sets designed by the art director János Pagonyi. It is inspired by the nineteenth century actress Déryné Róza Széppataki and is also known by the alternative title Déryné.

== Cast ==
- Ilonka Szabó as Déryné
- László Szilassy as Bartha Ákos
- Vera Szemere as Éva
- Gyula Csortos as Színiigazgató
- Piroska Vaszary as Lóri – Déryné öltöztetõnõje
- Árpád Lehotay as Gubernátor
- Ilona Tasnádi as Gubernátorné
- László Földényi as Bartha apja
- Zoltán Szakáts as Szentpétery
- Zoltán Makláry as Szabó
- Jenö Danis as Áron – inas
- Endre C. Turáni as Hórihorgas
- Gusztáv Vándory as Hajnisch
- István Szegedi Szabó as Kemény báró
- Pál Vessely as Rendezõ
- Lajos Alszeghy as Színész
- Ernõ Bartos as Vendég
- Rózsi Bordás as Pékné
- István Falussy as Vendég az estélyen
- Gusztáv Harasztos as Színházi vendég
- Sándor Hidassy as Rendbontó
- Gyözö Kabók as Pék
- József Medgyessy as Súgó

== See also ==
- Déryné, a 1951 Hungarian film

== Bibliography ==
- Juhász, István. Kincses magyar filmtár 1931–1944: az eredeti forgatókönyvből 1931 és 1944 között létrejött hazai mozgóképekről. Kráter, 2007.
- Ostrowska, Dorota, Pitassio, Francesco & Varga, Zsuzsanna. Popular Cinemas in East Central Europe: Film Cultures and Histories. Bloomsbury Publishing, 2017.
- Rîpeanu, Bujor. (ed.) International Directory of Cinematographers, Set- and Costume Designers in Film: Hungary (from the beginnings to 1988). Saur, 1981.
