= Much Ado About Emmi =

1940 film

- Directed by: Sándor Szlatinay
- Written by: János Zalabéri Horváth
- Based on: Much Ado About Emmi by Károly Aszlányi
- Produced by: Ernõ Teichmann; János Zalabéri Horváth
- Starring: Zita Szeleczky; Pál Jávor; Gyula Csortos
- Cinematography: Rudolf Icsey
- Edited by: László Katonka
- Music by: Sándor Szlatinay
- Production company: Magyar Film Iroda
- Release date: 17 October 1940
- Running time: 84 minutes
- Country: Hungary
- Language: Hungarian

Much Ado About Emmi (Hungarian: Sok hühó Emmiért) is a 1940 Hungarian comedy film directed by Sándor Szlatinay and starring Zita Szeleczky, Pál Jávor and Gyula Csortos. It was shot at the Hunnia Studios in Budapest. The film's sets were designed by the art directors István Básthy and Sándor Iliszi.

== Cast ==
- Zita Szeleczky as Emmi
- Pál Jávor as Málnássy Gábor
- Gyula Csortos as Vince, Málnássy komornyikja
- Mariska Vízváry as Szánthódyné
- Tivadar Bilicsi as Szánthódy István
- Manyi Kiss as Falusi szobalány
- Sándor Pethes as Dr. Fekete, Málnássy titkára
- Éva Szaplonczay as Szánthódy Éva
- Gyözö Kabók as Pásztor
- Gyula Kompóthy as Elekes, földbirtokos
- Gyula Köváry as Sakkozó lakáj
- Gizi Hernády as Piri, Emmi barátnõje
- Lajos Sugár as Anyakönyvvezetõ
- Andor Sárossy as Falusi hentes
- József Berky as Cigányprímás
- Anni Eisen as Vendég az esküvõn
- Béla Fáy as Málnásy barátja

== Bibliography ==
- Juhász, István. Kincses magyar filmtár 1931-1944: az eredeti forgatókönyvből 1931 és 1944 között létrejött hazai mozgóképekről. Kráter, 2007.
- Rîpeanu, Bujor. (ed.) International Directory of Cinematographers, Set- and Costume Designers in Film: Hungary (from the beginnings to 1988). Saur, 1981.
- Vilmos, Várkonyi. Jávor Pál: és a magyar film aranykora. Zima Szabolcs, 2013.
