= Jenö Pataky =

Hungarian actor

Jenő Pataky
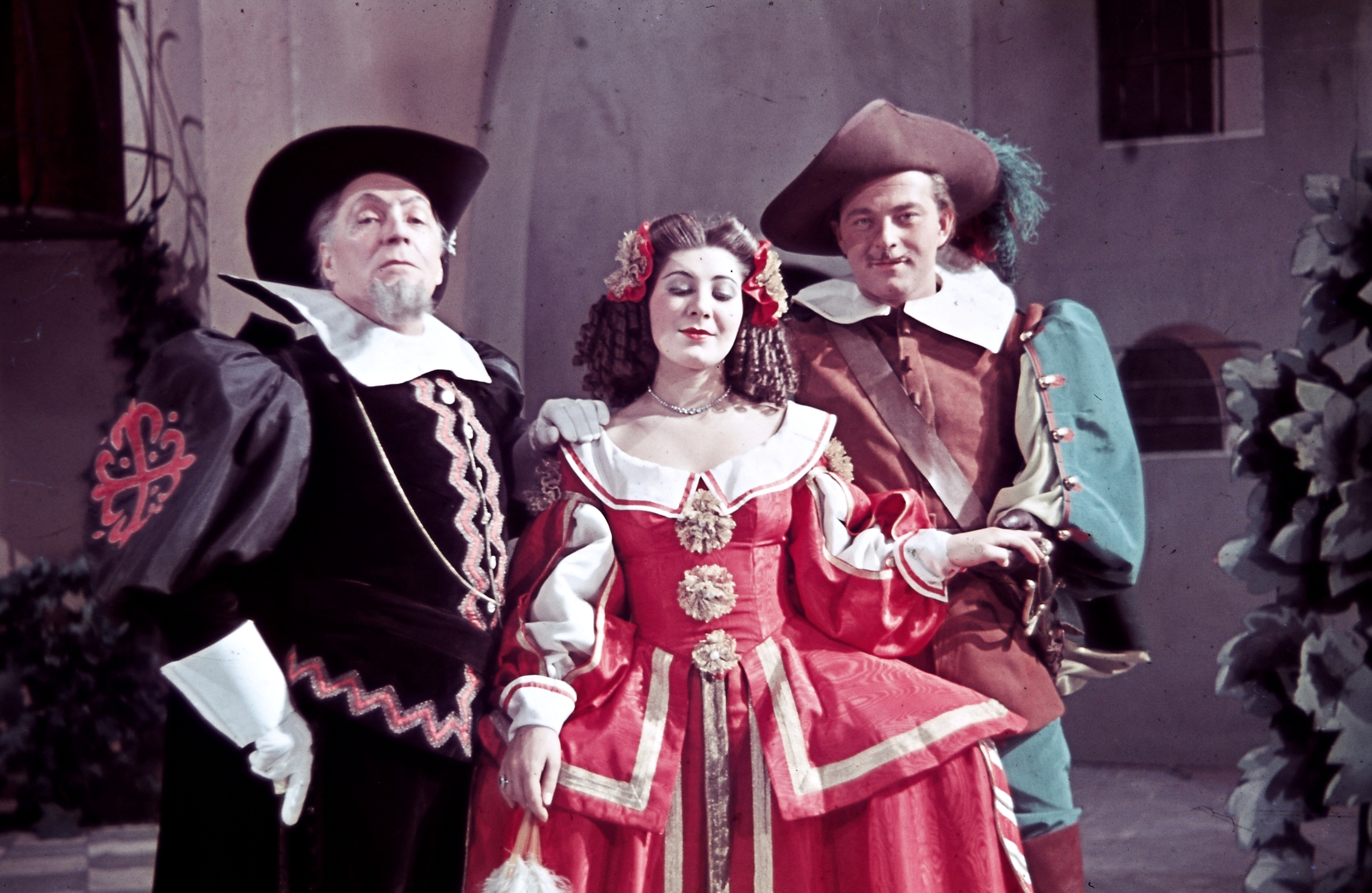
- Pataky (right) in 1943.
- Born: 8 September 1914; Budapest, Austria-Hungary
- Died: 15 February 1996 (aged 81); Budapest, Hungary
- Occupation: Actor
- Years active: 1936–1992 (film)

Jenő Pataky (1914–1996) was a Hungarian stage, film and television actor. He played supporting roles in a number of Hungarian films.

== Selected filmography ==
- Mother (1937)
- Tokay Rhapsody (1937)
- Modern Girls (1937)
- The Ball Is On (1939)
- Duel for Nothing (1940)
- The Unquiet Night (1940)
- The Gyurkovics Boys (1941)
- Cadet Love (1942)
- Male Fidelity (1942)
- Deadly Kiss (1942)
- Rózsa Nemes (1943)
- African Bride (1944)

== Bibliography ==
- Nemeskürty, István & Szántó, Tibor. A Pictorial Guide to the Hungarian Cinema, 1901-1984. Helikon, 1985.
- Székely, György & Gajdó, Tamás. Magyar színháztörténet: 1920-1949. Akadémiai Kiadó, 1990.
