= László Perényi =

Hungarian actor

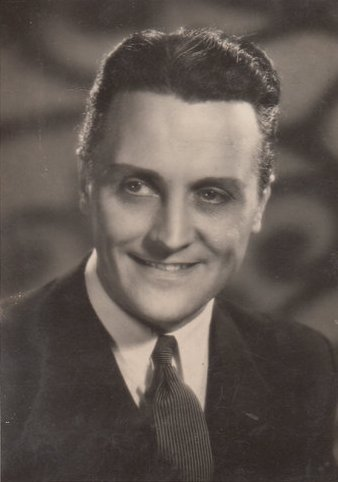
- Perényi in 1942.
- Born: 25 April 1910; Szászrégen, Austro-Hungarian Empire
- Died: 8 November 1993 (aged 83); Baja, Hungary
- Occupation: Actor
- Years active: 1935–1954 (film)

László Perényi (1910–1993) was a Hungarian stage and film actor. He was married to the actress Margit Árpád during the 1930s.

== Selected filmography ==
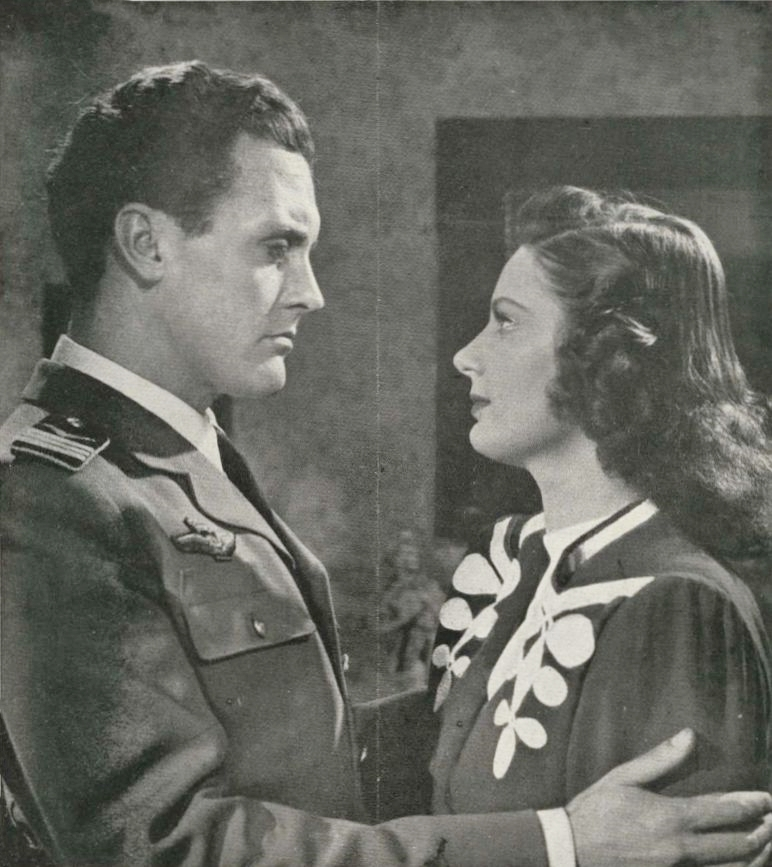
With Vera Szemere in Hungarian Eagles (1944).

- The Empress and the Hussar (1935)
- Budapest Pastry Shop (1935)
- Wild Rose (1939)
- The Gyurkovics Boys (1941)
- At the Crossroads (1942)
- Deadly Kiss (1942)
- The Dance of Death (1942)
- The Night Girl (1943)
- Hungarian Eagles (1944)
- Boy or Girl? (1944)

== Bibliography ==
- Nemes, Károly. A magyar film útja. Uránusz Kiadó, 1999.
- Székely, György & Gajdó, Tamás. Magyar színháztörténet: 1920-1949. Akadémiai Kiadó, 1990.
