= Boy or Girl? (1944 film) =

1944 film

- Directed by: László Kalmár
- Written by: László Kalmár; Júlianna Zsigray
- Produced by: Miklós Szalontai Kiss
- Starring: Gábor Rajnay; Vera Szemere; Irén Pelsöczy
- Cinematography: Rudolf Icsey
- Edited by: Zoltán Kerényi
- Music by: Rudolf Mecseky
- Production company: Magyar Írók Filmje
- Release date: 1944
- Running time: 96 minutes
- Country: Hungary
- Language: Hungarian

Boy or Girl? (Hungarian: Fiú vagy lány?) is a 1944 Hungarian comedy film directed by László Kalmár and starring Gábor Rajnay, Vera Szemere and Irén Pelsöczy. It was shot at the Hunnia Studios in Budapest. The film's sets were designed by the art director Lajos Lévay.

== Synopsis ==
In a rural town, a doctor and painter court the attractive daughters of the landlord of the inn they are staying in. After their marriage, money is offered by a relative to the first couple to have a boy.

== Cast ==
- Gábor Rajnay as Pötörke Máté Mihály, vendéglõs
- Vera Szemere as Julika
- Irén Pelsöczy as Katika, Pötörke lánya
- János Sárdy as Dr. Szõnyi Viktor
- László Perényi as Galambos György
- Mariska Vízváry as Tóni néni, Galambos nagynénje
- Ilonka Körmendi as Poppi
- Vajk Böjthy as Misi
- Erzsi Csók as Patkós Gitta
- Ferenc Zentai as Monostory Gábor
- Béla Venczel as Flinta
- Lucy Cziráky as Hölgy az orvosi váróteremben
- Anni Eisen as ápolónõ
- István Falussy as Vendég az esküvõn
- György Hajnal as Suhajda bácsi, páciens
- Livia Hajnóczi as hölgy a Három Kakukkban
- Mici Haraszti as Vucsekné, hölgy a kozmetikai szalonban
- Gyula Szabó as Sanyi, pincér
- Géza Kardos as Színigazgató, esküvõi vendég
- Éva Kállay as A hölgy-asztaltársaság tagja a születésnapi ünnepségen
- István Lontay as Orvos
- Antal Lédeczi as Vucsek úr

== Bibliography ==
- Balski, Grzegorz. Directory of Eastern European Film-makers and Films 1945-1991. Flicks Books, 1992.
- Juhász, István. Kincses magyar filmtár 1931-1944: az eredeti forgatókönyvből 1931 és 1944 között létrejött hazai mozgóképekről. Kráter, 2007.
- Rîpeanu, Bujor. (ed.) International Directory of Cinematographers, Set- and Costume Designers in Film: Hungary (from the beginnings to 1988). Saur, 1981.
