= Margit Makay =

Hungarian actress (1891–1989)

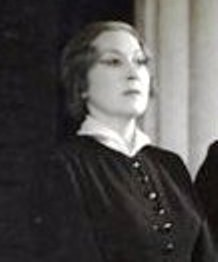
- Makay in 1937
- Born: 4 August 1891; Miskolc, Austria-Hungary
- Died: 6 November 1989 (aged 98); Budapest, Hungary
- Occupation: Actress
- Years active: 1912–1989

Margit Makay (4 August 1891 – 6 November 1989) was a Hungarian film actress. She appeared in 30 films between 1912 and 1989.

== Selected filmography ==
- Man of Gold (1919)
- The Five-Forty (1939)
- The Bercsenyi Hussars (1940)
- Mouse in the Palace (1943)
- A Woman Gets a Start (1949)
- Erkel (1952)
- Two Confessions (1957)
- Pillar of Salt (1958)
- Red Ink (1960)
- Cats' Play (1972)
- 141 Minutes from the Unfinished Sentence (1975)
- A Very Moral Night (1977)
- Bye Bye Chaperon Rouge (1989)
