= Who Killed Anabela? =

1956 film

- Directed by: Dezső Ákos Hamza
- Written by: Orígenes Lessa; Alfredo Palácios; Salomão Scliar; Miroel Silveira
- Produced by: Mário Audrá; Alfredo Palácios
- Starring: Ana Esmeralda; Jaime Costa; Procópio Ferreira
- Cinematography: Rudolf Icsey
- Edited by: José Cañizares
- Music by: Gabriel Migliori
- Production company: Cinematográfica Maristela
- Distributed by: Columbia Pictures do Brasil
- Release date: 1956
- Running time: 95 minutes
- Country: Brazil
- Language: Portuguese

Who Killed Anabela? (Portuguese: Quem Matou Anabela?) is a 1956 Brazilian mystery crime film directed by Dezső Ákos Hamza and starring Ana Esmeralda, Jaime Costa and Procópio Ferreira. Both the director and the cinematographer Rudolf Icsey were exiles from Communist Hungary.

== Cast ==
- Ana Esmeralda
- Jaime Costa
- Procópio Ferreira
- Ruth de Souza
- Carlos Araújo
- Carlos Cotrim
- Ary Fernandes
- Francisco Camargo
- João Franco
- Lourdes Freire
- Estela Gomes
- Nydia Lícia
- Olga Navarro
- Jorge Pisani
- Marina Prata
- Américo Taricano
- Aurélio Teixeira
- Carlos Zara

== Bibliography ==
- Dennison, Stephanie & Shaw, Lisa. Popular Cinema in Brazil, 1930–2001. Manchester University Press, 2019.
