= Árpád Lehotay =

Hungarian actor (1896–1953)

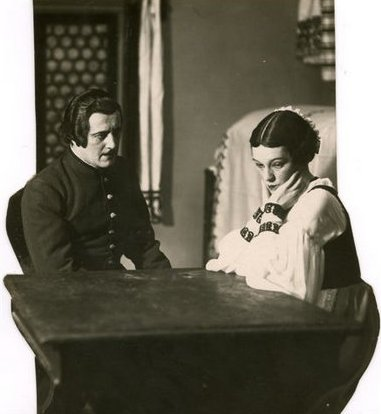
- Lehotay with Gizi Bajor in 1932.
- Born: 27 April 1896; Lõcse, Austro-Hungarian Empire
- Died: 19 October 1953 (aged 57); Budapest, Hungary
- Occupation: Actor
- Years active: 1927–1950 (film)

Árpád Lehotay (1896–1953) was a Hungarian stage and film actor. He was married to the actress Vera Sennyei.

== Selected filmography ==
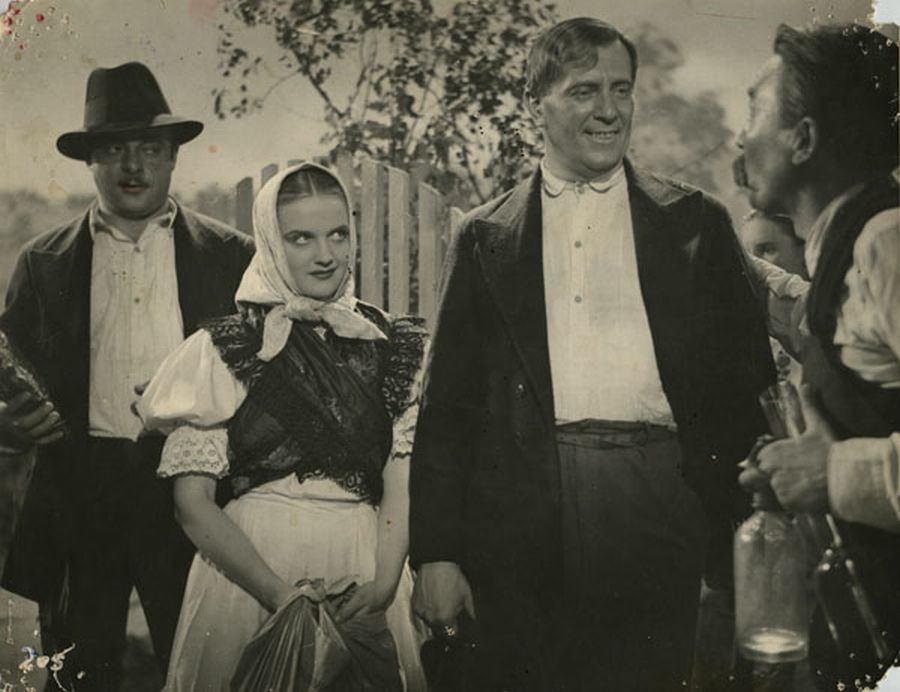
Lehotay in Flower of the Tisza (1939).

- Help, I'm an Heiress (1937)
- Tokay Rhapsody (1937)
- Flower of the Tisza (1939)
- Wild Rose (1939)
- Silenced Bells (1941)
- Male Fidelity (1942)
- The Talking Robe (1942)
- We'll Know By Midnight (1942)
- Magdolna (1942)
- A Heart Stops Beating (1942)
- Eva Szovathy (1944)
- Wildfire (1944)
- Prophet of the Fields (1947)
- Treasured Earth (1948)
- The Siege of Beszterce (1948)
- Mickey Magnate (1949)
- Singing Makes Life Beautiful (1950)

== Bibliography ==
- Halász, Zoltán. Cultural Life in Hungary. Pannonia Press, 1966.
- Waldman, Harry. Nazi Films in America, 1933-1942. McFarland, 2008.
