= Rózsi Csikós =

Hungarian actress (1917–1992)

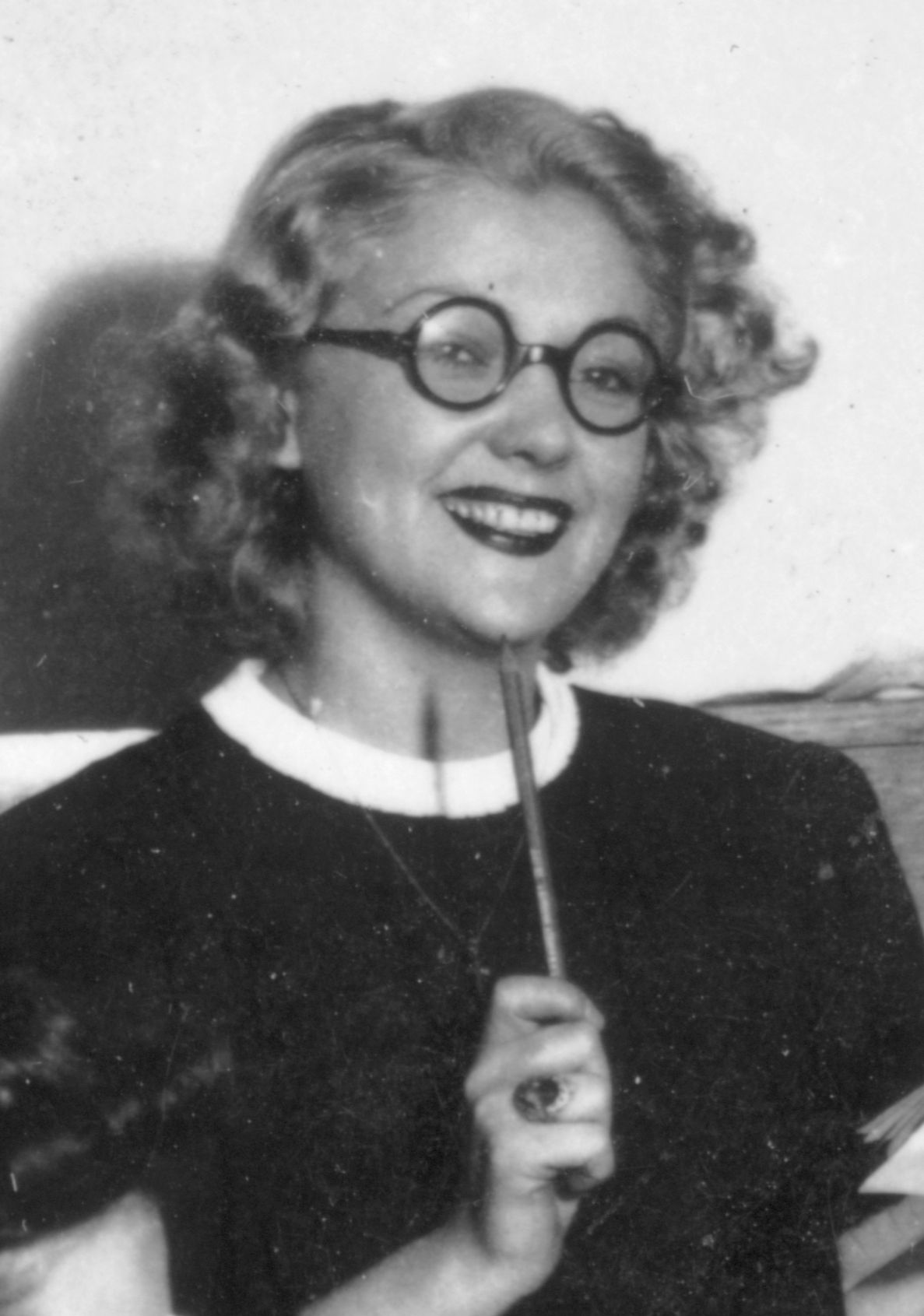
- Csikós in 1939
- Born: 11 November 1917; Budapest, Austro-Hungarian Empire
- Died: 7 January 1992 (aged 74); Budapest, Hungary
- Occupation: Actress
- Years active: 1932–1980 (film and TV)
- Spouse: Szabolcs Fényes

Rózsi Csikós (11 November 1917 – 7 January 1992) was a Hungarian stage and film actress. She appeared at a variety of theatres including the Budapesti Operettszínház and established herself as a leading soubrette. During the 1930s and 1940s she appeared in several films. She was married to the film score composer Szabolcs Fényes.

== Selected filmography ==
- Filléres gyors (1932)
- Roses from the South (1934)
- Villa for Sale (1935)
- Escape to the Adriatic (1937)
- We'll Know By Midnight (1942)
- Mouse in the Palace (1943)
- Quite a Lad (1943)
- Suburban Guard Post (1943)
- Sunday Romance (1957)

== Bibliography ==
- Fekete, Márton. Prominent Hungarians: Home and Abroad. Szepsi Csombor Literary Circle, 1979.
- Petrie, Graham. History Must Answer to Man: The Contemporary Hungarian Cinema. Corvina Kiadó, 1981.
