= One Night in Transylvania =

1941 film by Frigyes Bán

- Directed by: Frigyes Bán
- Written by: István Asztalos (play); László Kalmár; Gábor Vaszary; Johann von Vásáry
- Produced by: Antal Takács
- Starring: Zita Szeleczky; Mária Lázár; Antal Páger; Mária Mezei
- Cinematography: István Eiben
- Edited by: Zoltán Kerényi
- Music by: Szabolcs Fényes
- Production company: Hunnia Filmgyár
- Release date: 19 November 1941
- Running time: 80 minutes
- Country: Hungary
- Language: Hungarian

One Night in Transylvania (Hungarian: Egy éjszaka Erdélyben) is a 1941 Hungarian historical comedy film directed by Frigyes Bán and starring Zita Szeleczky, Mária Lázár and Antal Páger. It was based on the play Alterego by István Asztalos. It was screened at the Venice Film Festival.

== Cast ==
- Zita Szeleczky as Alvinczy Krisztina
- Mária Lázár as Mária Terézia
- Antal Páger as II.József
- Mária Mezei as Henriette grófnõ
- István Nagy as Kléber kapitány
- Miklós Hajmássy as Kancellár
- György Kürthy as Erdélyi gubernátor
- Ibolya Bilinszky as Udvarhölgy
- Aranka Gazdy as Parasztasszony
- Gyula Kompóthy as Fõkomornyik

== Bibliography ==
- Cunningham, John. Hungarian Cinema: From Coffee House to Multiplex. Wallflower Press, 2004.
- Rozenblit, Judson. Constructing Nationalities in East Central Europe. Berghahn Books, 2005.
