= Ary Fernandes =

Brazilian playwright, actor, producer and filmmaker

- Born: March 31, 1931; São Paulo, Brazil
- Died: August 29, 2010 (aged 79)
- Occupations: Actor, producer, director
- Years active: 1956–1997

Ary Fernandes (March 31, 1931 – August 29, 2010) was a Brazilian playwright, actor, producer and filmmaker. He was born in São Paulo.

== Selected filmography ==
- Who Killed Anabela? (1956)
- Il domestico (1974)
