= Disillusion (film) =

1943 film

- Directed by: Frigyes Bán
- Written by: Pál Barabás
- Produced by: Lajos Güttler
- Starring: Katalin Karády; Mariska Vízváry; Miklós Hajmássy
- Cinematography: Barnabás Hegyi
- Edited by: Péter Pokol
- Music by: Károly De Fries
- Production company: Palatinus Filmterjesztõ Vállalat
- Release date: 26 March 1943
- Running time: 85 minutes
- Country: Hungary
- Language: Hungarian

Disillusion (Hungarian: Csalódás) is a 1943 Hungarian drama film directed by Frigyes Bán and starring Katalin Karády, Mariska Vízváry and Miklós Hajmássy. It was shot at the Hunnia Studios in Budapest. The film's sets were designed by the art directors István Básthy and Sándor Iliszi.

== Cast ==
- Katalin Karády as Ág Ilona
- Mariska Vízváry as Hámor Anyja
- Vera Sennyei as Gabi - Ilona barátnõje
- Miklós Hajmássy as Hámor Ferenc - igazgató
- Ernö Mihályi as Podrinetz
- Dezsõ Kertész as Jimmy, Szilvia egykori partnere
- Gyula Szöreghy as Józsi, londiner
- Nándor Bihary as Krick Teodor, nõimitátor
- Terka Császár as Rabnö
- Teri Járay as Artistanõ
- Mária Palotai as Kutas Szilvia
- Gusztáv Pártos as Igazgató
- Lajos Selley as Artista
- Lajos Sugár as Szállodaportás

== Bibliography ==
- Balski, Grzegorz. Directory of Eastern European Film-makers and Films 1945–1991. Flicks Books, 1992.
- Juhász, István. Kincses magyar filmtár 1931–1944: az eredeti forgatókönyvből 1931 és 1944 között létrejött hazai mozgóképekről. Kráter, 2007.
- Rîpeanu, Bujor. (ed.) International Directory of Cinematographers, Set- and Costume Designers in Film: Hungary (from the beginnings to 1988). Saur, 1981.
