= Devil Rider =

1944 film

- Directed by: Dezső Ákos Hamza
- Written by: Miklós Asztalos
- Starring: Gyula Benkő; Manyi Kiss; Mária Sulyok
- Cinematography: Ferenc Fekete; Barnabás Hegyi
- Edited by: Félix Máriássy
- Music by: Tibor Polgár
- Production company: Délibáb Filmgyártó
- Release date: 15 March 1944
- Running time: 82 minutes
- Country: Hungary
- Language: Hungarian

Devil Rider (Hungarian: Ördöglovas) is a 1944 Hungarian historical adventure film directed by Dezső Ákos Hamza and starring Gyula Benkő, Manyi Kiss and Mária Sulyok. The film's sets were designed by the art directors Sándor Iliszi and Imre Sőrés. It is inspired by the life of the nineteenth century Hungarian aristocrat Móric Sándor, who married the daughter of Austrian statesman Klemens von Metternich.

== Cast ==
- Alice Fényes as Leontine
- Manyi Kiss as Josefine
- Mária Sulyok as Metternich felesége
- Gyula Benkő as Sándor Móric
- Zoltán Makláry as Kosztanovics
- Zoltán Szakáts as Metternich
- Livia Hajnóczi as Szobalány
- Brigitta Cserna as Kőrössy Ágota grófnõ
- Géza Kardos as Sándor Móric gróf apja
- Lenke Csanádi as Borka, Kőrössy Ágota grófnő szobalánya
- Béla Fáy
- Sándor Hidassy
- Lajos Gárday
- Melinda Vajda
- Samu Balázs
- Gusztáv Vándory
- György Gonda
- Gusztáv Pártos
- Gusztáv Harasztos
- Lajos Sugár

== Bibliography ==
- Frey, David. Jews, Nazis and the Cinema of Hungary: The Tragedy of Success, 1929–1944. Bloomsbury Publishing, 2017.
- Judson, Pieter and M. Rozenblit, Marsha L. (ed). Constructing Nationalities in East Central Europe. Berghahn Books, 2005.
- Juhász, István. Kincses magyar filmtár 1931–1944: az eredeti forgatókönyvből 1931 és 1944 között létrejött hazai mozgóképekről. Kráter, 2007.
- Rîpeanu, Bujor. (ed.) International Directory of Cinematographers, Set- and Costume Designers in Film: Hungary (from the beginnings to 1988). Saur, 1981.
