= Carmen (1953 film) =

1953 film

- Directed by: Giuseppe Maria Scotese
- Written by: Vittorio Calvino; Julián Cortés Cavanillas; Prosper Mérimée (novel); Giuseppe Maria Scotese
- Produced by: Ugo Berti
- Starring: Ana Esmeralda; Fausto Tozzi; Mariella Lotti
- Cinematography: Renato Del Frate
- Edited by: Otello Colangeli; Francisco García Velázquez
- Production companies: Italo Iberica Film; Suevia Films
- Distributed by: Suevia Films
- Release date: 1953
- Running time: 82 minutes
- Countries: Italy; Spain
- Language: Italian

Carmen (Italian: Carmen proibita, Spanish: Siempre Carmen) is a 1953 Italian-Spanish drama film directed by Giuseppe Maria Scotese and starring Ana Esmeralda, Fausto Tozzi and Mariella Lotti. It is based on Prosper Mérimée's novel Carmen.

== Plot ==
A Panamanian cargo ship docks at night at a dock on the Guadalquivir River. José, chief officer of Italian origin, is on duty on the ship. Carmen, an attractive gypsy from Granada, who works in Seville with a gang of tobacco smugglers, comes up on deck and begins to dance to distract the attention of the men on board, thus allowing her cronies to unload the merchandise from the ship. However, the police discover the operation and intervene. Carmen manages to flee from the investigations thanks to the protection of José, who falls madly in love with her.

== Cast ==
- Ana Esmeralda as Carmen, la gitana
- Fausto Tozzi as José Salviatti
- Mariella Lotti as Margaret, l'americana
- Umberto Spadaro as Commissario Barreiro
- Mario Cabré as Torero Juanito Trianera
- José Jaspe as Tuerto
- Rafael Albaicín as Un guappo
- Enzo Furlai
- Michele Riccardini
- Vittorio André
- Renato Lupi
- Yuhara Abdullah
- Gianni Rizzo

== Bibliography ==
- Goble, Alan (1999). The Complete Index to Literary Sources in Film. Walter de Gruyter. ISBN 978-3-11-095194-3.
