= Mountain Girl (film) =

1942 film

- Directed by: Zoltán Farkas
- Written by: Cecile Tormay (novel); Viktor Bánky; Sándor Dallos
- Produced by: István Kaiser
- Starring: Alice Fényes; István Nagy; Margit Ladomerszky
- Cinematography: István Berendik; Árpád Makay
- Edited by: Zoltán Farkas
- Music by: Béla Dolecskó
- Release date: 1942
- Running time: 78 minutes
- Country: Hungary
- Language: Hungarian

Mountain Girl (Hungarian: A hegyek lánya) is a 1942 Hungarian drama film directed by Zoltán Farkas and starring Alice Fényes, István Nagy and Margit Ladomerszky. It is based on a novel by nationalist author Cecile Tormay and is set in Transylvania, part of which had recently returned to Hungarian rule following the Second Vienna Award.

== Cast ==
- Alice Fényes as Jella
- István Nagy as Réz András, pályamunkás
- Margit Ladomerszky as Giachinta, Jella anyja
- Zoltán Greguss as Davarin, kocsislegény
- Erzsi Orsolya as Jagoda, az eszelõs öregasszony
- Zoltán Hosszú as Balogh Péter, pályaõr
- Gusztáv Pártos as Árus
- Sándor Tompa as Vasutas
- Viola Orbán

== Bibliography ==
- Gergely, Gábor & Hayward, Susan. The Routledge Companion to European Cinema. Routledge, 2021.
- Juhász, István. Kincses magyar filmtár 1931–1944: az eredeti forgatókönyvből 1931 és 1944 között létrejött hazai mozgóképekről. Kráter, 2007.
- Rîpeanu, Bujor. (ed.) International Directory of Cinematographers, Set- and Costume Designers in Film: Hungary (from the beginnings to 1988). Saur, 1981.
