= I Am Guilty (1942 film) =

1942 film

- Directed by: Dezső Ákos Hamza
- Written by: Andor Pünkösti
- Produced by: Klára B. Kokas
- Starring: Mária Mezei; Gyula Kamarás; Gyula Csortos
- Cinematography: Árpád Makay
- Edited by: Zoltán Kerényi
- Music by: Szabolcs Fényes
- Production company: Magyar Írók Filmje
- Distributed by: Danubia Pictures
- Release date: 3 June 1942
- Running time: 97 minutes
- Country: Hungary
- Language: Hungarian

I Am Guilty (Hungarian: Bünös vagyok!) is a 1942 Hungarian drama film directed by Dezső Ákos Hamza and starring Mária Mezei, Gyula Kamarás and Gyula Csortos. It was shot at the Hunnia Studios in Budapest. The film's sets were designed by the art director Klára B. Kokas.

== Cast ==
- Mária Mezei as Lola
- Gyula Kamarás as Mátray Miklós
- Zsófia Koós as Bálint Klári
- Gyula Csortos as Szõke úr
- Margit Árpád as Bálintné
- Zoltán Greguss as Frici, Lola barátja
- Vali Rácz as Sári, Lola barátnõje
- György Kürthy as Bálint Kázmér
- Margit Vágóné as Kádár néni
- Sándor Hidassy as Mérnök
- Nusi Somogyi as Teri, szobalány
- Gusztáv Pártos as Bártulajdonos
- Géza Berczy as Tibor, Klári võlegénye
- Olly Szokolay as Lola barátnõje
- Gyula Benkö as Bárklarinétos
- Géza Halász as Mérnök
- Gusztáv Harasztos as Rendõr
- Lajos Kelemen as Építésvezetõ
- Gyula Terney asLola baráti társaságának tagja
- Rezsõ Acsay as Részeg hegedûs
- Ferenc Pataki as Bárvendég
- Éva Tihanyi as Bárhölgy

== Bibliography ==
- Juhász, István. Kincses magyar filmtár 1931-1944: az eredeti forgatókönyvből 1931 és 1944 között létrejött hazai mozgóképekről. Kráter, 2007.
- Rîpeanu, Bujor. (ed.) International Directory of Cinematographers, Set- and Costume Designers in Film: Hungary (from the beginnings to 1988). Saur, 1981.
