= African Bride =

1944 film directed by István Balogh

- Directed by: István Balogh
- Written by: Zoltan Deak; Károly Nóti; László Segesdy
- Produced by: István Erdélyi
- Starring: Kálmán Latabár; Piroska Vaszary; Valéria Hidvéghy
- Cinematography: István Eiben
- Edited by: Félix Máriássy
- Music by: Béla Dolecskó
- Production company: Erdélyi Filmgyártó
- Distributed by: Kárpát Film; Danubia Pictures
- Release date: 31 January 1944
- Running time: 88 minutes
- Country: Hungary
- Language: Hungarian

African Bride (Hungarian: Afrikai vőlegény) is a 1944 Hungarian comedy film directed by István Balogh and starring Kálmán Latabár, Piroska Vaszary and Valéria Hidvéghy. It was shot at the Hunnia Studios in Budapest. The film's sets were designed by the art director József Simoncsics.

== Synopsis ==
A young man has been in correspondence with Mária a Hungarian woman living in Africa. Without ever meeting her, he falls in love with her. Having met the woman, and fearing that she is ill-matched to his friend, his actor buddy persuades the attractive young daughter of his landlady to pretend to be Mária.

== Cast ==
- Kálmán Latabár as Kökény Tóbiás
- Piroska Vaszary as Mária
- Valéria Hidvéghy as Szalkay Manci
- Mici Haraszti as aunt Mici
- Lenke Egyed as housekeeper
- Kornélia Gárdos as Mrs. Szalkay, Manci's mother
- Jenö Pataky as Berinday György
- Gusztáv Pártos as Dömötör Döme, strongman
- László Misoga as Feri, footman
- Sári Rédey as Mail lady
- Angela Christian as Bözsi, Beautician
- Erzsi Czobor as assistant
- Erzsébet Nádudvarya as Mari, Maid of Szalkays
- Gusztáv Harasztos as Civil servant
- Lajos Sugár as Concierge
- Ferenc Szabó as Nagy János

== Bibliography ==
- Frey, David. Jews, Nazis and the Cinema of Hungary: The Tragedy of Success, 1929-1944. Bloomsbury Publishing, 2017.
- Juhász, István. Kincses magyar filmtár 1931-1944: az eredeti forgatókönyvből 1931 és 1944 között létrejött hazai mozgóképekről. Kráter, 2007.
- Rîpeanu, Bujor. (ed.) International Directory of Cinematographers, Set- and Costume Designers in Film: Hungary (from the beginnings to 1988). Saur, 1981.
