= Alice Fényes =

Hungarian actress (1918–2007)

- Born: 11 May 1918; Nagyvárad, Austro-Hungarian Empire
- Died: 25 May 2007 (aged 89); London, England
- Occupation: Actress
- Years active: 1941–1945 (film)
- Family: Lajos Zilahy (uncle)

Alice Fényes (11 May 1918 – 25 May 2007) was a Hungarian stage and film actress. She enjoyed stardom in wartime Hungary playing several leading roles, before emigrating to settle in London in exile from Communist Hungary. She was the niece of writer Lajos Zilahy.

== Selected filmography ==
- Europe Doesn't Answer (1941)
- Beautiful Star (1942)
- Mountain Girl (1942)
- The Marsh Flower (1943)
- Ragaszkodom a szerelemhez (1943)
- Devil Rider (1944)
- After the Storm (1945)

== Bibliography ==
- Fekete, Márton . Prominent Hungarians: Home and Abroad. Szepsi Csombor Literary Circle, 1979.
- Juhász, István. Kincses magyar filmtár 1931–1944: az eredeti forgatókönyvből 1931 és 1944 között létrejött hazai mozgóképekről. Kráter, 2007.
