= Magdolna (film) =

1942 film

- Directed by: Kálmán Nádasdy
- Written by: István Békeffy
- Based on: Magdolna by Zsolt Harsányi
- Starring: Mária Lázár; Ida Turay; Iván Petrovich
- Cinematography: Árpád Makay
- Edited by: Zoltán Kerényi
- Music by: Tibor Polgár
- Production company: Magyar Írók Film
- Release date: 18 March 1942
- Running time: 99 minutes
- Country: Hungary
- Language: Hungarian

Magdolna is a 1942 Hungarian romantic drama film directed by Kálmán Nádasdy and starring Mária Lázár, Ida Turay and Iván Petrovich. It was shot at the Hunnia Studios in Budapest. The film's sets were designed by the art director Klára B. Kokas. It was based on a novel of the same title by Zsolt Harsányi.

== Cast ==
- Mária Lázár as Magdolna
- Árpád Lehotay as Zoltán
- Artúr Somlay as Szilágyi Ákos
- Ida Turay as Klári
- Iván Petrovich as Detky Pál
- Gyula Kamarás as Péter Tímár
- Piroska Vaszary as Helén
- Gyula Benkö as Tamás
- Margit Árpád as Judit
- Vali Rácz as Jolanta
- Nusi Somogyi as Hairdresser
- János Sárdy as Singer
- Tivadar Bilicsi as Uncle Pali
- Sándor Hidassy as Policeman
- Lajos Bakay as Guest
- Lajos Kelemen as Guest
- Gusztáv Harasztos as Guest
- Ferenc Szabó as Valet
- Tivadar Horváth as Hairdresser
- Tibor Puskás as Billy
- Margit Sívó as A lady in Erpresso
- Margit Zsilley as An Actress in stage
- László Gaál as Waiter

== Bibliography ==
- Juhász, István. Kincses magyar filmtár 1931-1944: az eredeti forgatókönyvből 1931 és 1944 között létrejött hazai mozgóképekről. Kráter, 2007.
- Rîpeanu, Bujor. (ed.) International Directory of Cinematographers, Set- and Costume Designers in Film: Hungary (from the beginnings to 1988). Saur, 1981.
