= Bronze and Moon =

- Directed by: Javier Setó
- Written by: Antonio Guzmán Merino
- Starring: José Suárez; Ana Esmeralda; Isabel de Castro
- Cinematography: Emilio Foriscot
- Edited by: Ramon Quadreny
- Music by: Augusto Algueró
- Production company: IFI Producción
- Distributed by: IFISA
- Release date: 15 June 1953
- Country: Spain
- Language: Spanish

Bronze and Moon (Spanish: Bronce y luna) is a 1953 Spanish film directed by Javier Setó and starring José Suárez, Ana Esmeralda and Isabel de Castro.

== Cast ==
- Francisco Albiñana
- Barta Barri
- Enrique Borrás
- Jesús Colomer
- Isabel de Castro
- María Victoria Durá
- Ana Esmeralda
- Manuel Gas
- Ramón Hernández
- Jorge Morales
- Ramón Quadreny
- José Suárez
- Francisco Tuset

== Bibliography ==
- Crusells, Magi. Directores de cine en Cataluña: de la A a la Z. Edicions Universitat Barcelona, 2009.
