= Elma Bulla =

Hungarian actress (1913–1980)

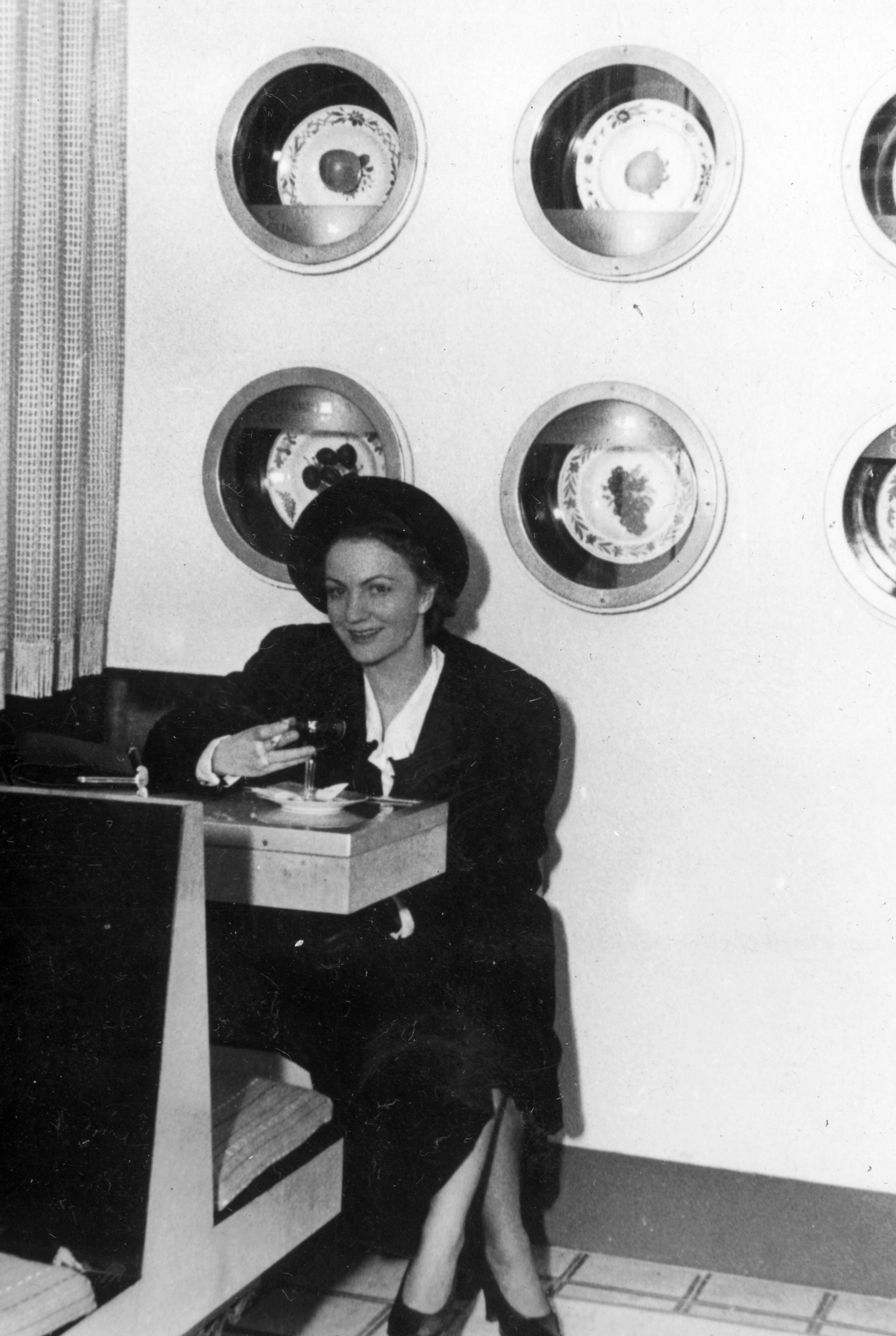
- Elma Bulla in 1939
- Born: 26 August 1913; Selmecbánya, Austro-Hungarian Empire
- Died: 14 May 1980 (aged 66); Budapest, Hungary
- Occupation: Actress
- Years active: 1930–1980 (film & TV)

Elma Bulla (August 26, 1913 – May 14, 1980) was a Hungarian stage and film actress. She appeared in more than sixty film and television shows. She was married to the writer Ferenc Fendrik.

== Selected filmography ==
- A Gentleman for Hire (1930)
- Everything for the Woman (1934)
- It Was Me (1936)
- Let's Love Each Other (1941)
- Temptation (1942)
- We'll Know By Midnight (1942)
- Guard House Number 5 (1942)
- Male Fidelity (1942)
- Rózsa Nemes (1943)
- Under the City (1953)
- A Glass of Beer (1955)
- Trotta (1971)
- Cats' Play (1972)

== Bibliography ==
- Barrett, Michael S. Foreign Language Films and the Oscar: The Nominees and Winners, 1948-2017. McFarland, 2018.
- Goble, Alan. The Complete Index to Literary Sources in Film. Walter de Gruyter, 1999.
