= Suburban Guard Post =

1943 film

- Directed by: Dezső Ákos Hamza
- Written by: István Békeffy; Dezső Ákos Hamza
- Produced by: Béla Csepreghy
- Starring: Katalin Karády; István Nagy; Rózsi Csikós
- Cinematography: Árpád Makay
- Edited by: Mária Vály
- Music by: Jenő Sándor
- Production company: Léna Film
- Release date: 26 July 1943
- Running time: 91 minutes
- Country: Hungary
- Language: Hungarian

Suburban Guard Post (Hungarian: Külvárosi őrszoba) is a 1943 Hungarian drama film directed by Dezső Ákos Hamza and starring Katalin Karády, István Nagy and Rózsi Csikós. It was shot at the Hunnia Studios in Budapest. The film's sets were designed by the art directors Klára B. Kokas and Imre Sőrés. Karády plays one of her characteristic femme fatale roles. Stylistically it resembles film noir.

== Synopsis ==
A young police officer is taken under the wing of an experienced colleague and becomes engaged to his daughter Lidi. However one night on a raid he encounters a woman playing an accordion in a shady bar who sets out to seduce him away from his duty and his fiancée.

== Cast ==
- Katalin Karády as Harmonikás Gizi
- István Nagy as Tóth XVII.János rendõr
- Rózsi Csikós as Lidi, Nagyék lánya
- Imre Toronyi as Nagy Miklós, rendõr fõtörzsõrmester
- Ilona Dajbukát as Nagyné
- Gyula Csortos as Frici, bûvész
- Nusi Somogyi as Gáspár mama
- János Makláry as Karcsi, rablógyilkos
- Endre C. Turáni as 'Vak' koldus
- Irma Cserei as Öreg kofa
- Lenke Egyed as Asszony
- Gina Halász as Utcalány
- Sándor Hidassy as Rendõr
- Ottó Jeney as Detektív
- József Juhász as Bandi
- Lajos Kelemen as Detektív
- Antal Matány as Karcsi barátja
- László Misoga as Fényképész
- József Mátray as Rendõrtiszt
- Gusztáv Pártos as Kocsmáros
- Vera Szemere as Ápolónõ
- Imre Tóth as Detektív

== Bibliography ==
- Kelecsényi, László. Karády 100. Noran Libro Kiadó, 2011.
- Király, Jenő. Karády mítosza és mágiája. Háttér Lap- és Könyvkiadó, 1989.
- Ostrowska, Dorota, Pitassio, Francesco & Varga, Zsuzsanna. Popular Cinemas in East Central Europe: Film Cultures and Histories. Bloomsbury Publishing, 2017.
