= Willi Völker =

German footballer

Personal information
- Date of birth: 13 October 1906
- Place of birth: Berlin, Germany
- Date of death: 23 February 1946 (aged 39)
- Place of death: Ukrainian SSR
- Position: Defender

Senior career*
Years	Team	Apps	(Gls)
- Hertha BSC

International career
1929	Germany	1	(0)
- * Club domestic league appearances and goals

Willi Völker (13 October 1906 – 23 February 1946) was a German footballer who played as a defender for Hertha BSC and the Germany national team.

== Personal life ==
Völker served as a Gefreiter (private) in the German Army during the Second World War. Captured by Soviet forces, he died in a prisoner of war camp in Ukraine on 23 February 1946.
