= Vilma Medgyaszay =

Hungarian actress and theatre director (1885–1972)

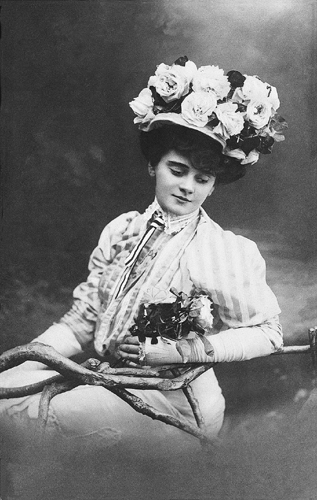
- Vilma Medgyaszay
- Born: 3 May 1885; Arad, Austria-Hungary
- Died: 5 April 1972 (aged 86); Budapest, Hungary
- Occupations: Actress and theatre director

Vilma Medgyaszay (3 May 1885 – 5 April 1972) was a Hungarian actress and theatre director.

== Career ==
'Medgyaszay is responsible for the popularizing of melodized poems by Hungarian poet Endre Ady. From 1913 to 1915, Medgyaszay operated the theatre that is currently the Budapest Puppet Theatre, naming it Medgyaszay Cabaret and singing folk songs on stage. She had a role in the 1938 film Rézi Friday and the 1941 film Háry János.
