= Zita Szeleczky =

Hungarian actress

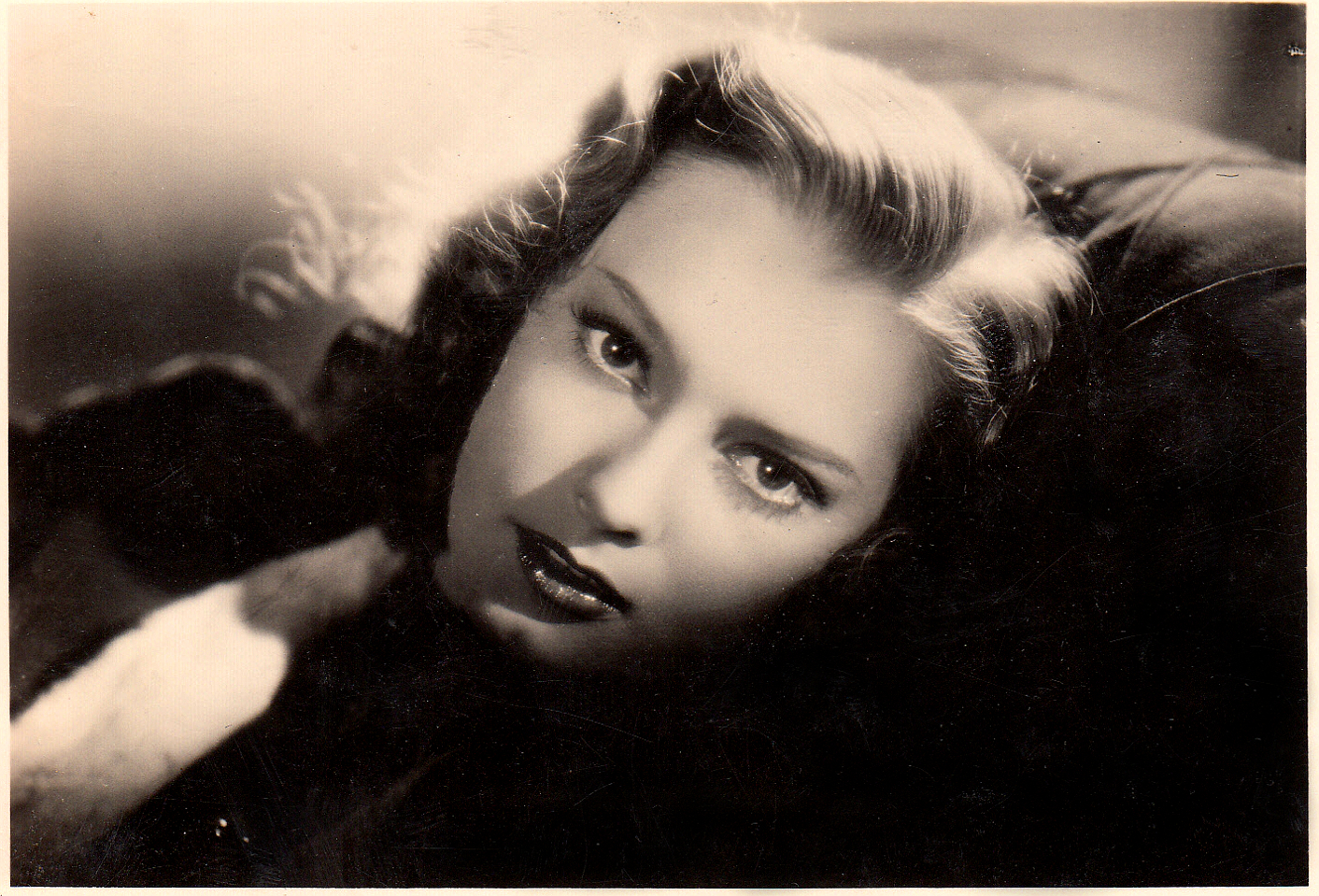
- Szeleczky in the Tentazione (Temptation) Italian movie (1942). This is also the photo used in her 100th birthday stamp
- Born: Zita Klára Terézia Szeleczky; 20 April 1915; Budapest, Austria-Hungary
- Died: 12 July 1999 (aged 84); Érd, Hungary
- Occupation: Actress
- Years active: 1937–1951

Zita Szeleczky (born Zita Klára Terézia Szeleczky 20 April 1915 – 12 July 1999) was a Hungarian stage and film actress.

== Life ==
She graduated from theatre school in 1937 and was discovered the following year. She would go on to play in almost 30 films between then and 1944, while becoming a regular at Hungary's Nazi rallies, being described as the "darling of the Arrow Cross". In 1940 she married Gyula Haltenberger, however this marriage ended at an unknown later date. She continued to perform up until 1944, even while Soviet troops were advancing on Budapest and the allies were bombing Hungary, where she "agitated for the continuation of the war, supporting the murderous Szálasi-regime".

In December 1944, just prior to the collapse of Hungary, Szeleczky fled to Austria and later to Genoa, Italy. In 1947 she was tried in absentia "for her fascist propaganda", where she was sentenced to three years in prison. Still in exile, she fled to Argentina some time prior to 1951, where she performed in Vivir un instante. Due to the fact she couldn't speak Spanish, she was unable to continue her theatre career, and thus began touring Hungarian émigré communities. On these tours she played in a variety of performances, including operettas, poetry recitals and variety shows.

=== Move to the United States ===
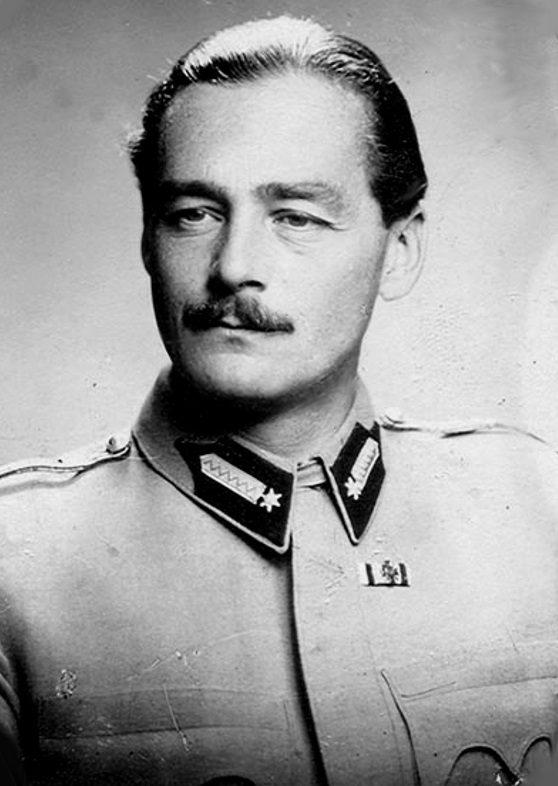
Wass c. 1943

In 1962, Szeleczky moved to California where she married Paul Illés. This marriage also ended at an unknown later date, however Szeleczky remained in California. She later married Sándor Novák in 1972, however this marriage also ended at an unknown later date.

Szeleczky later met with Albert Wass, a Hungarian writer who had also fled Hungary. Wass fled with the forces of the Third Reich, after which he found himself in Germany. Following World War II he emigrated to the United States, later being condemned as a war criminal during the Romanian People's Tribunals. The United States refused to extradite him, citing a lack of evidence.

The two collaborated while Wass was trying to sell his books, as Szeleczky made cassettes and LP records of his writings and singing Hungarian folk songs.

=== Return to Hungary and death ===
In 1988, Szeleczky returned to Hungary. In 1993 she was exonerated by the Supreme Court of Hungary, stating that she was convicted with fabricated charges. She was later awarded the Cross of the Hungarian Republic. She died in 1999.

== Legacy ==
In 2015, the Hungarian Postal Service issued a stamp commemorating the 100th birthday Szeleczky. György Lázár, a Hungarian immigrant living in the US, criticized Szeleczky for being a fascist due to her involvement with the Arrow Cross Party, otherwise known as the Hungaristas.

He also stated that she "never expressed any remorse about her wartime activities and never acknowledged that her fascist propaganda contributed to the suffering of the Hungarian people", and that she considered her support of the Arrow Cross Party "an expression of patriotism, never condemning them."

== Selected filmography ==
- Beauty of the Pusta (1937)
- Black Diamonds (1938)
- Billeting (1938)
- Azurexpress (1938)
- The Poor Rich (1938)
- Stars of Variety (1939)
- The Ball Is On (1939)
- Gül Baba (1940)
- Rózsafabot (1940)
- The Bercsenyi Hussars (1940)
- Wedding March (1944)
- The Last of the Vereczkeys (1940)
- Much Ado About Emmi (1940)
- Property for Sale (1941)
- The Marriage Market (1941)
- One Night in Transylvania (1941)
- Siamese Cat (1943)
- Hungarista Est a Magyar Művelődés Házában.1944. (1944)
- To Live for a Moment (1951)

== Archive footage ==
- A Jávor (1987)
