= Dream car =

Dream car may refer to:

- Supercar, a very fast performance car
- Luxury car, a very expensive car with luxurious fittings
- Show car, a custom display car
- Concept car, a car designed to display concepts, whose physical representation may be a prototype or a mockup

== See also ==
- Dreamcar, an American musical group
- The Dream Car, a 1934 film
- Car of Dreams, a 1935 film
- Dream Car Garage, Canadian TV series
- How It's Made: Dream Cars, a spinoff of TV show How It's Made
