= Béla Balogh =

Hungarian filmmaker

- Born: 1 January 1885; Székesfehérvár, Austria-Hungary
- Died: 30 March 1945 (aged 60); Szentendre, Hungary
- Years active: 1918–1943
- Spouse: Margit Kornai (1883-1953)

Béla Balogh (1 January 1885 in Székesfehérvár – 30 March 1945 in Budapest) was a Hungarian film director, one of the most prominent of the early 20th century. He was prominent in both silent and voiced productions and is most known for movies like Havi 200 fix, Ópiumkeringő, and Úrilány szobát keres.

== Biography ==
Béla Balogh was born on 1 January 1885, in Székesfehérvár, as a child of a theatrical family. His grandfather, István Balogh was a playwright, his aunt and uncle were successful actors, and his father, Gusztáv Balogh was a conductor, touring the country with different companies. Out of his eleven siblings - him being the youngest - only two, a sister and a brother survived. He trained to be an actor from a young age, starting in the Barcsai Street high school's drama society.

He became the member of the Népligeti acting group in 1904, the penny theatre of the People's Park in Budapest. He later worked in the countryside in musical productions and as director, returning to the capital in 1908, working in Újpest, and from 1911 in Budapest, in the Royal Orfeum, as a stage inspector in the Budapest Opera, and he also managed a small movie theatre.

In 1915 he married actress Margit Kornai (Mária Kronémer), mother of writer Mária Szepes. After serving one year in World War I he successfully simulated neurosis, and after being declared disabled by army medicals, he was discharged. Developing their previous company Balogh & Mogán, Balogh then worked with his wife on the founding of the Astra Film Factory, becoming its first artistic director. In 1919 the German Star Film Company invited Balogh to work as a director in their newly built studio in Pasarét. Like other industry talents Michael Curtiz and Alexander Korda, he also got foreign offers, including the Sascha Company from Vienna. But unlike his contemporaries, he turned them down, citing his fears working outside Hungary, and no knowledge of language.

During the Hungarian Soviet Republic in 1919 his films got banned. The following Horthy government also investigated on him a year later for "conspirating with communists" (on 1 May 1919 Balogh shoot a short film of the festival on Margaret Island). The charges were dropped a few months later. Although he became the chief director of the Star Studio between 1920 and 1924, he fall into the background during the twenties, which made him fall into deep depression. He shoot educational films for the People's Park Pedagogical Film Company, for small fees. Following the urging of his wife, he travelled to Berlin for better opportunities in 1926. Although he managed to raise funds for a film, he fell ill, and travelled back home. To make a living, and against his will, he taught private students with filming ambitions. For monetary reasons, he moved back to Berlin with his family, living there between 1931 and 1933. From 1935 he started directing again, producing his most memorable movies, including Édes mostoha, A megfagyott gyermek (the voiced version of his 1921 film) or Havi 200 fix, working together with the biggest stars of his era, like Pál Jávor, Gyula Kabos or Antal Páger. In 1941 he started a new company, Balogh Film LLC, producing two films during WWII, the last one being Ópiumkeringő with actress Katalin Karády, after which the war forced Balogh to liquidate the firm. Balogh being seriously ill, the family survived the Siege of Budapest in their summer cottage in Leányfalu. As the conditions of war prevented a proper diagnosis, Béla Balogh died in 1945 in the hospital of Szentendre.

== Legacy ==
Throughout his life, Béla Balogh directed 50 silent and 17 sound films, with numerous experiments in the language of motion picture, he was a pioneer of Hungarian cinema.

== Selected filmography ==
- Az obsitos (1917)
- Tilos a csók (1919)
- Under the Mountains (1920)
- Soldiers of the Emperor (1920)
- The Frozen Child (1921)
- A lélek órása (1923)
- Fehér galambok fekete városban (1923)
- Aranymadár (1924)
- The Market of Life (1928)
- Kind Stepmother (1935)
- Salary, 200 a Month (1936)
- Tomi (1936)
- Lady Seeks a Room (1937)
- Money Is Coming (1939)
- Wild Rose (1939)
- Rózsafabot (1940)
- Everybody Loves Someone Else (1940)
- Don't Ask Who I Was (1941)
- Ópiumkeringő (1943)
