= The State Department Store =

1953 film by Viktor Gertler

- Directed by: Viktor Gertler
- Written by: Tibor Barabás; Szilárd Darvas; Béla Gádor
- Produced by: Laszlo Vegh
- Starring: Miklós Gábor; Kálmán Latabár; Kamill Feleki; Zsuzsa Petress
- Cinematography: Ottó Forgács
- Edited by: Sándor Zákonyi
- Music by: János Kerekes
- Production company: Magyar Filmgyártó Vállalat
- Release date: 23 January 1953
- Running time: 96 minutes
- Country: Hungary
- Language: Hungarian

The State Department Store (Hungarian: Állami áruház) is a 1953 Hungarian musical comedy film directed by Viktor Gertler and starring Miklós Gábor, Kálmán Latabár and Kamill Feleki. The film is set in and around a Budapest department store, whose employees are battling against black marketeers.

== Cast ==
- Miklós Gábor - Kocsis Ferenc
- Kálmán Latabár - Dániel
- Kamill Feleki - Glauziusz
- Zsuzsa Petress - Ilonka
- Ida Turay - Boriska
- Lajos Mányai - Dancs
- Tivadar Horváth - Klimkó
- Gyula Gózon - Bezzegh bácsi
- Anna Tõkés - Iványiné
- Mária Mezei - Dancsné
- Andor Ajtay
- János Bagyinszky
- John Bartha - A man who walking in the boathouse with an oar on his shoulder
- Ida Boros
- Emmi Buttykay (as Buttykai Emmi)
- György Bárdy (as György Bárdi)
- Endre Csonka
- Sándor Deák
- György Dénes
- István Egri
- Antal Farkas
- Márta Fónay
- Zsuzsa Gordon
- János Gálcsiki
- Imre Halmay
- László Hlatky
- Teri Horváth
- Gyula Justh
- László Kabos
- János Kalocsai
- Gyula Kamarás
- László Keleti
- László Kemény
- Vilmos Komlós
- Gyula Köváry
- Lajos Lendvai
- Lenke Lorán
- Tibor Molnár
- Erzsi Orsolya (as Erzsébet Orsolya)
- Sándor Pethes
- Sándor Peti
- József Petrik
- Imre Pongrácz
- Erzsi Pártos
- Rudolf Romhányi
- Mária Rákosi
- Kálmán Rózsahegyi
- Kornélia Sallay (as Sallai Kornélia)
- Nusi Somogyi
- Imre Soós
- József Szendrő
- Éva Szentirmai
- László Ujlaky

== Bibliography ==
- Mitter, Rana & Major, Patrick. Across the Blocs: Cold War Cultural and Social History. Psychology Press, 2004.
