= Imre Ráday =

Hungarian actor (1905–1983)

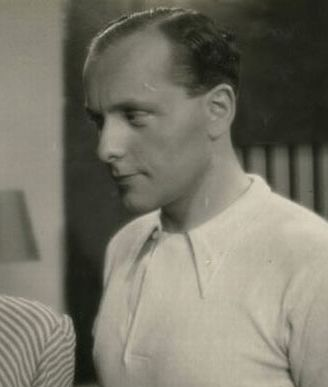
Imre Ráday in There Are Exceptions (1937).

Imre Ráday (4 September 1905 – 12 March 1983) was a Hungarian film actor.

Ráday was born in Budapest, then part of Austria-Hungary and died in Budapest, Hungary in 1983.

== Selected filmography ==
- The Trial of Donald Westhof (1927)
- The Woman in the Cupboard (1927)
- At the Edge of the World (1927)
- The Csardas Princess (1927)
- Strauss Is Playing Today (1928)
- Frauenarzt Dr. Schäfer (1928)
- Kiss Me, Darling (1932)
- The Dream Car (1934)
- It Happened in March (1934)
- Peter (1934)
- The Wise Mother (1935)
- Address Unknown (1935)
- Cobweb (1936)
- Be True Until Death (1936)
- Danube Rendezvous (1936)
- Anniversary (1936)
- The Borrowed Castle (1937)
- There Are Exceptions (1937)
- My Daughter Is Different (1937)
- An Affair of Honour (1937)
- Sweet Revenge (1937)
- The Lady Is a Bit Cracked (1938)
- Full Steam Ahead (1951)
- Dollar Daddy (1956)
- Up the Slope (1959)
- A Husband for Susy (1960)
- Guns and Doves (1961)
- Alba Regia (1961)
- The Lost Generation (1968)
- The Girl Who Liked Purple Flowers (1973)
- Mrs. Dery Where Are You? (1975)
- The Phantom on Horseback (1976)

== Bibliography ==
- Jung, Uli & Schatzberg, Walter. Beyond Caligari: The Films of Robert Wiene. Berghahn Books, 1999.
