= Gusztáv Vándory =

Hungarian actor

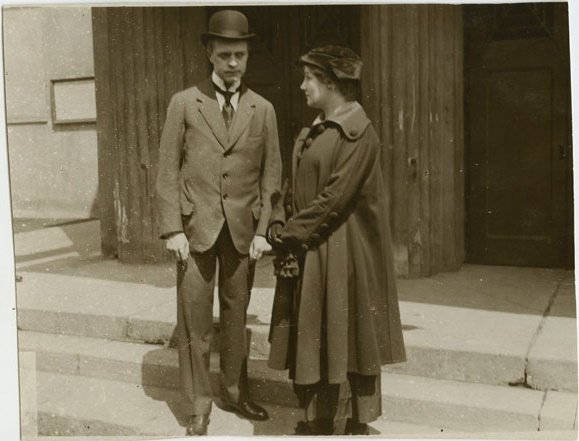

Gusztáv Vándory (6 December 1882 – 16 November 1964) was a Hungarian stage and film actor. He was born and died in Budapest.

== Selected filmography ==
- Lili (1918)
- Yamata (1919)
- Neither at Home or Abroad (1919)
- Veszélyben a pokol (1921)
- The Seventh Veil (1927)
- Hyppolit, the Butler (1931)
- The Blue Idol (1931)
- Spring Shower (1932)
- Flying Gold (1932)
- Kiss Me, Darling (1932)
- The Old Scoundrel (1932)
- An Auto and No Money (1932)
- Miss Iza (1933)
- The Rakoczi March (1933)
- The Dream Car (1934)
- It Happened in March (1934)
- Kind Stepmother (1935)
- Address Unknown (1935)
- The Golden Man (1936)
- Be True Until Death (1936)
- Anniversary (1936)
- Hotel Springtime (1937)
- Tales of Budapest (1937)
- Tokay Rhapsody (1937)
- Help, I'm an Heiress (1937)
- Sweet Revenge (1937)
- Modern Girls (1937)
- Sportszerelem (1938)
- Azurexpress (1938)
- The Wrong Man (1938)
- The Lady Is a Bit Cracked (1938)
- The Hen-Pecked Husband (1938)
- The Ball Is On (1939)
- The Five-Forty (1939)
- Flower of the Tisza (1939)
- Princess of the Puszta (1939)
- Dankó Pista (1940)
- Gábor Göre Returns (1940)
- Duel for Nothing (1940)
- Queen Elizabeth (1940)
- A Bowl of Lentils (1941)
- Left-Handed Angel (1941)
- Silenced Bells (1941)
- Taken by the Flood (1941)
- Prince Bob (1941)
- Flames (1941)
- Katyi (1942)
- Kádár Versus Kerekes (1942)
- Male Fidelity (1942)
- Guard House Number 5 (1942)
- Sirius (1942)
- We'll Know By Midnight (1942)
- The Marsh Flower (1943)
- Quite a Lad (1943)
- Annamária (1943)
- Wedding March (1944)
- Devil Rider (1944)
- Masterless Woman (1944)
- Eva Szovathy (1944)
- Wildfire (1944)
- Semmelweis (1952)

== Bibliography ==
- Kulik, Karol. Alexander Korda: The Man Who Could Work Miracles. Virgin Books, 1990.
- Schildgen, Rachel A. More Than A Dream: Rediscovering the Life and Films of Vilma Banky. 1921 PVG Publishing, 2010.
