= Ödön Bárdi =

Hungarian actor (1877–1958)

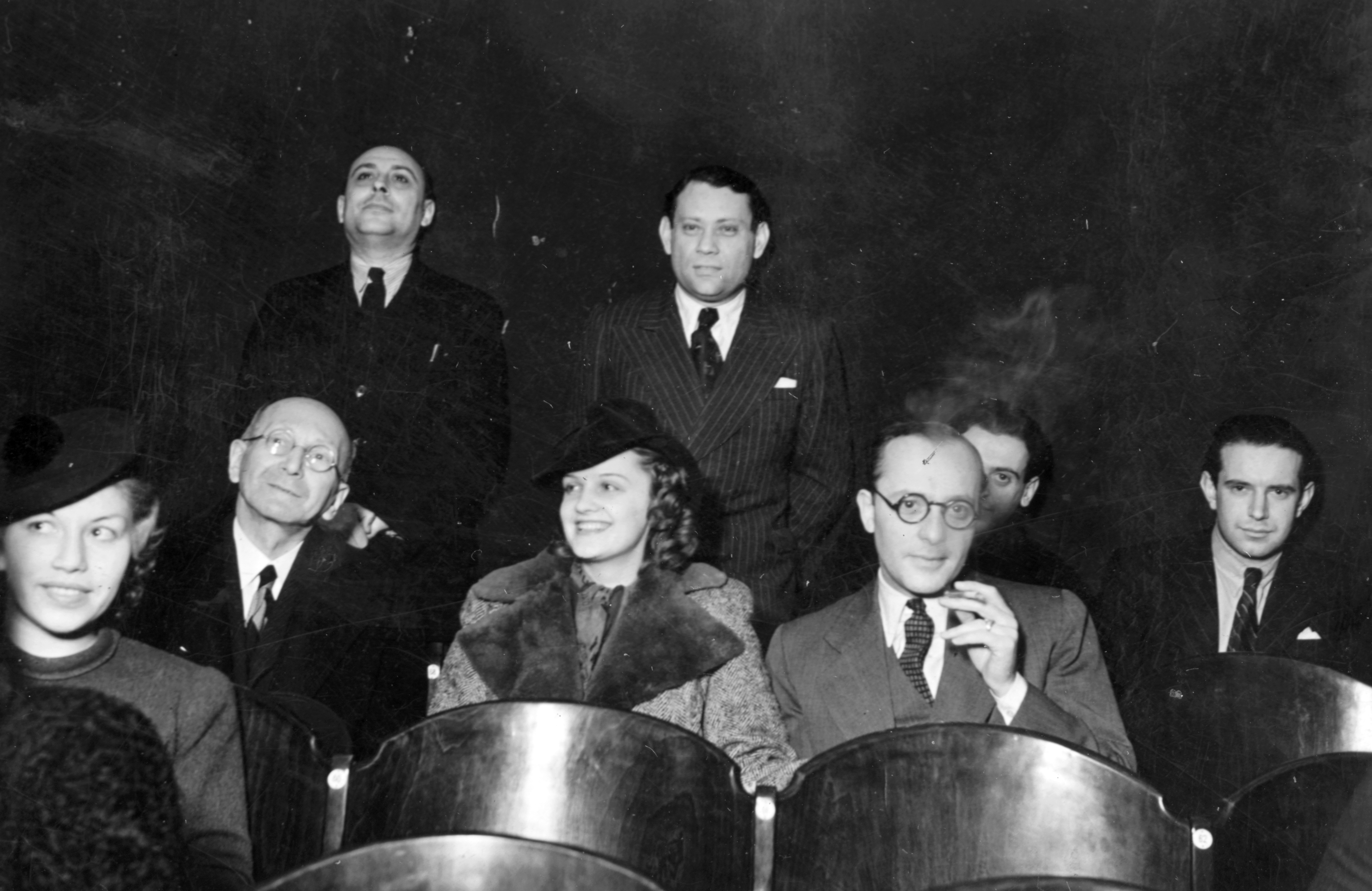
Ödön Bárdi (left, in the middle row)

Ödön Bárdi (5 January 1877, in Pilisborosjenő – 24 June 1958, in Budapest) was a Hungarian actor.

== Selected filmography ==
- A Csodagyerek (1920)
- Lord Arthur Savile's Crime (1920)
- It Happened in March (1934)
- I May See Her Once a Week (1937)
- Tales of Budapest (1937)
- Hotel Springtime (1937)
- Azurexpress (1938)
- Man Sometimes Errs (1938)
- The Schoolmistress (1945)
- Professor Hannibal (1956)
