= Kind Stepmother =

1935 film directed by Béla Balogh

- Directed by: Béla Balogh
- Written by: Artúr Lakner
- Produced by: László Sas
- Starring: Maria von Tasnady; Antal Páger; Gerö Mály
- Cinematography: Lajos Berger Berend
- Edited by: László Kalmár
- Music by: Sándor Szlatinay
- Production company: Hermes Film
- Distributed by: Danubia Pictures
- Release date: 15 October 1935
- Running time: 90 minutes
- Country: Hungary
- Language: Hungarian

Kind Stepmother (Hungarian: Édes mostoha) is a 1935 Hungarian drama film directed by Béla Balogh and starring Maria von Tasnady, Antal Páger and Gerö Mály. It was shot at the Hunnia Studios in Budapest. The film's sets were designed by the art director István Szirontai Lhotka.

== Synopsis ==
A widowed baron is told that it will be good for his young daughter if he remarries but when he brings his former sweetheart Mária to the house and introduces her as his wife, Erzsike is terrified due to what she has been told about wicked stepmothers.

== Cast ==
- Maria von Tasnady as Mária
- Antal Páger as Hargittay András báró
- Gerö Mály as Safranek, intézeti portás
- Gizi Pécsi as Erzsike, Hargittay lánya
- Mici Erdélyi as Bella, Mária barátnõje
- Gyula Gózon as Frici, az artista
- Gusztáv Vándory as Dr.Gárdonyi, a háziorvos
- Piroska Vaszary as Ibolya
- Ilona Dajbukát as Gazdaasszony
- Sally Kitty as Sztepptáncos kislány az intézeti ünnepségen
- István Lontay as Inas
- Éva Telbisz as Pesztonka
- Karola Zala as Az intézet igazgatónõje
- Ibolya Orbán as Intézeti nevelõnõ
- Teri Radó as Intézeti nevelönö

== Bibliography ==
- Juhász, István. Kincses magyar filmtár 1931-1944: az eredeti forgatókönyvből 1931 és 1944 között létrejött hazai mozgóképekről. Kráter, 2007.
- Rîpeanu, Bujor. (ed.) International Directory of Cinematographers, Set- and Costume Designers in Film: Hungary (from the beginnings to 1988). Saur, 1981.
