= Dream Car Garage =

- Starring: Peter Klutt; Co-hosts: Tom Hnatiw (2002-08); Michelle Jobin (2009-10); Marni Van Dyk (2011-12) Guest co-host: Ron Fellows (2008-10)
- Country of origin: Canada

Production
- Running time: 30 minutes

Original release
- Network: Mentv (2002, 2004, 2005); Speed Channel (2005?-2008); SUN TV (2009-)

Dream Car Garage was a weekly television show produced by Westward Wind Productions for 11 seasons between 2002 and 2012. The series was produced in Halton Hills, Ontario. Its host was Peter Klutt, a car enthusiast and the owner of Legendary Motorcar Ltd., where many of the vehicles featured in the show came from.

From 2002 to 2008 Klutt's co-host was motor journalist and race announcer Tom Hnatiw, who was famous for the phrase "Do you need a car like this? No. Do you want a car like this???" He was succeeded in 2009 by television personality Michelle Jobin, primarily known as Global News weather presenter, for two seasons. Jobin's successor from 2011 to 2012 was comedian Marni Van Dyk. The Canadian racing driver Ron Fellows was an occasional guest co-host from 2008 to 2010.

== Successor ==
The de facto successor to the programme was Legendary Motorcar, where "Peter Klutt and his crew at Legendary Motorcars buy, restore, sell and race classic, vintage and muscle cars". Hitherto two or three series have been produced. The first of eleven episodes of Series one aired on November 13, 2012, on Velocity. The last of 15 episodes of series two went to air on May 27, 2014.

== Regular features ==
The show - generally rather heavy on product promotion, even more so in later years - focused on what it considered to be the "dream cars" of the regular, "everyday man". It featured a Classic Dream Car segment presented by Klutt, which cantered around an older car that would appeal to collectors or simply a nostalgic buyer, as well as a Modern Dream Car segment, presented by Hnatiw, which involved a modern supercar or high-performance vehicle.

Every season, the team chose an old or broken down car and repairs/tunes it for the show.

- The Pro Shop: Features fabrication and assembly tips.
- Pro Drivers tips (2009-): Features performance driving tips by professional racer.
- The Collectors (2009-): Features dream car collector.

== Specials ==
Some of the one-hour-long special episodes of the TV show include:

- Old School Corvette Racer, a documentary on turning a 1960s Chevrolet Corvette into a modernized racer, and putting it into a vintage race series;
- Small Block Shootout, which compares small-block muscle cars;
- Muscle Car Shootout, which compares 7 big-block muscle cars (including LS6 Chevrolet Chevelle, Pontiac GTO Judge, Hurst Olds / 455 H.O., Buick GSX, Boss 429 Ford Mustang and AMC AMX).

== See also ==
- The Care of Your Car
