= Anna Tőkés =

Hungarian actress (1903–1966)

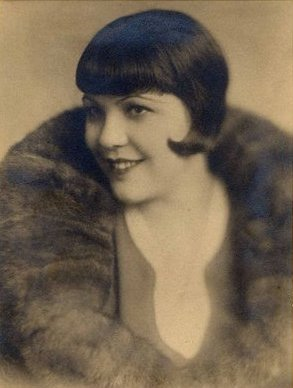
- Tőkés circe 1920-25
- Born: 1 March 1903; Marosvásárhely, Austria-Hungary
- Died: February 25, 1966 (aged 62); Budapest, Hungary
- Occupation: Actress
- Years active: 1936–1962 (film)

Anna Tőkés (March 1, 1903 – December 25, 1966) was a Hungarian stage and film actress. Tőkés was a Transylvanian born in what is today Târgu Mureș in Romania, but was then part of the Austro-Hungarian Empire. Like many ethnic Hungarians, she moved to Hungary following the First World War. She starred in the 1936 First World War film Cafe Moscow.

== Selected filmography ==
- Cafe Moscow (1936)
- Hotel Springtime (1937)
- Man Sometimes Errs (1938)
- Hungary's Revival (1939)
- Lóránd Fráter (1942)
- The State Department Store (1953)
- Pillar of Salt (1958)
- Sunshine on the Ice (1961)

== Bibliography ==
- István Nemeskürty & Tibor Szántó. A Pictorial Guide to the Hungarian Cinema, 1901-1984. Helikon, 1985.
