= The Borrowed Castle =

1937 film

- Directed by: Ladislao Vajda
- Written by: Dezsö Kellér (poems); Gyula Pekár (play); Adorján Stella; István Békeffy
- Produced by: Ferenc Pless
- Starring: Piroska Vaszary; Ida Turay; Imre Ráday
- Cinematography: Andor Vidor
- Edited by: Viktor Bánky
- Music by: Jenö Sándor
- Production company: Harmónia Film
- Release date: 26 October 1937
- Running time: 85 minutes
- Country: Hungary
- Language: Hungarian

The Borrowed Castle (Hungarian: A kölcsönkért kastély) is a 1937 Hungarian romantic comedy film directed by Ladislao Vajda and starring Piroska Vaszary, Ida Turay, and Imre Ráday. The film's sets were designed by art director Márton Vincze.

== Cast ==
- Piroska Vaszary as Stanci néni
- Ida Turay as Koltay Kató
- Imre Ráday as Koltay Bálint
- Gábor Rajnay as Koltay Gábor
- Gyula Kabos as Gruber Menyhért
- Klári Tolnay as Mary
- Márton Rátkai as Dr. Gruber Sándor
- Zoltán Makláry as Gruber Richárd
- Gyula Köváry as A dadogós Gruber
- István Falussy as Az öreg Gruber
- Géza Berczy as Az elegáns Gruber
- József Juhász as Dr. Vass Ferenc
- Zoltán Hosszú as Varga bácsi
- István Egri as Gáldy István
- Ferenc Pethes as Jóska
- Gyöngyi Váry as Gruber rokona
- Hilda Gobbi as Gruber Sándor titkárnöje
- Lidia Beöthy as Gruber rokona
- Valéria Hidvéghy as Gruber rokona
- Zsuzsi Balla as Nászutas feleség a vonaton
- Mária Román as Postáskisasszony
- Gyula Justh as Portás
- Gusztáv Harasztos as Szakállas úr a vonatban
- Endre Markovits as Béres
- János Balassa as Föpincér
- Lajos Ujváry as Gruber rokona
- Ferenc Hoykó as Vasúti pénztáros

== Bibliography ==
- Biltereyst, Daniel, Maltby, Richard & Meers, Philippe (ed.) Cinema, Audiences and Modernity: New Perspectives on European Cinema History. Routledge, 2013.
- Juhász, István. Kincses magyar filmtár 1931-1944: az eredeti forgatókönyvből 1931 és 1944 között létrejött hazai mozgóképekről. Kráter, 2007.
- Rîpeanu, Bujor. (ed.) International Directory of Cinematographers, Set- and Costume Designers in Film: Hungary (from the beginnings to 1988). Saur, 1981.
