= My Daughter Is Different =

1937 film

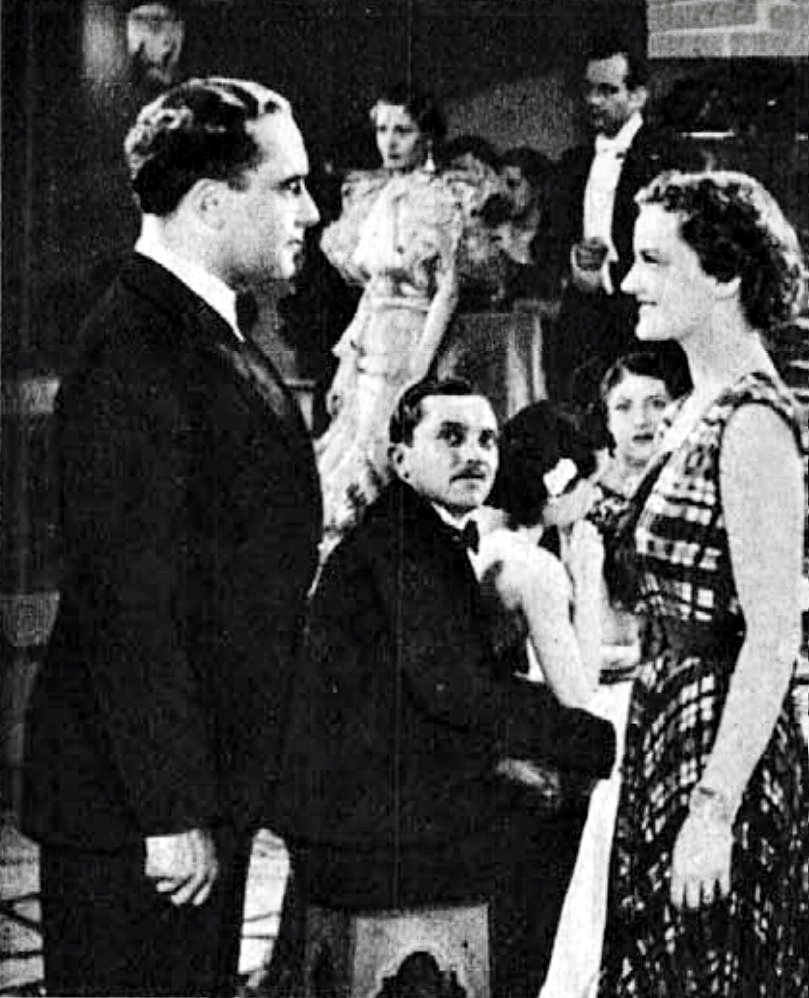
- Directed by: Ladislao Vajda
- Written by: Kálmán Csathó (play); Károly Nóti
- Produced by: Ferenc Pless
- Starring: Klári Tolnay; Imre Ráday; Ida Turay
- Cinematography: Andor Vidor
- Edited by: József Szilas
- Music by: Sándor Szlatinay
- Production company: Harmónia Film
- Release date: 14 November 1937
- Running time: 100 minutes
- Country: Hungary
- Language: Hungarian

My Daughter Is Different (Hungarian: Az én lányom nem olyan) is a 1937 Hungarian comedy film directed by Ladislao Vajda and starring Klári Tolnay, Imre Ráday and Ida Turay. It was shot at the Hunnia Studios in Budapest. The film's sets were designed by the art director Márton Vincze.

== Cast ==
- Klári Tolnay as Gitta
- Imre Ráday as Kalocsai Sándor
- Gábor Rajnay as Hubay Péter
- Ida Turay as Katinka
- Ella Gombaszögi as Gizi
- József Bihari as Tüzoltó
- István Egri as Társaságbeli fiatalember
- László Földényi as Bártulajdonos
- Zoltán Greguss as Fekete Ferenc
- Margit Ladomerszky as Katinka anyja
- Zoltán Makláry as Pénzbeszedü
- Erzsi Pártos as Teréz
- Vera Sennyei as Rózsi
- Zoltán Várkonyi as Pista
- Klári Dán as Bárhölgy
- Gyula Gózon as Kalauz
- Gyula Kabos as Béla bácsi
- Kálmán Rózsahegyi as Harcsa
- Mariska Vízváry as Annie néni

== Bibliography ==
- Juhász, István. Kincses magyar filmtár 1931-1944: az eredeti forgatókönyvből 1931 és 1944 között létrejött hazai mozgóképekről. Kráter, 2007.
- Rîpeanu, Bujor. (ed.) International Directory of Cinematographers, Set- and Costume Designers in Film: Hungary (from the beginnings to 1988). Saur, 1981.
