= Kiss Me, Darling =

1932 film

- Directed by: Béla Gaál
- Written by: Tamás Emöd; Béla Gaál; Zsolt Harsányi; László Vadnay
- Produced by: Ferenc Pless
- Starring: Marika Rökk; Imre Ráday; Antal Páger
- Cinematography: István Eiben
- Edited by: István György
- Music by: László Angyal; Jenö Sándor
- Production company: Pless Ferenc Filmvállalata
- Release date: 5 March 1932
- Running time: 102 minutes
- Country: Hungary
- Language: Hungarian

Kiss Me, Darling (Hungarian: Csókolj meg, édes!) is a 1932 Hungarian comedy film directed by Béla Gaál and starring Marika Rökk, Imre Ráday and Antal Páger.

== Cast ==
- Marika Rökk as Terike
- Imre Ráday as Jani, zeneakadémiai növendék
- Antal Páger as Keszeg András
- Gyula Gózon as Jegyző
- Kálmán Rózsahegyi as Szobi, kocsmáros
- Erzsi Somogyi as Pengő Julis
- László Vadnay as Író
- Marcsa Simon as Szomszédasszony
- Gusztáv Vándory as Boltossegéd
- Piroska Vaszary as Cselédlány
- Béla Gaál as Rendező
- Andor Sárossy as Baka
- Steven Geray as Pali, medikus
- Tamás Emöd as Író
- Andor Heltai as Cigányprímás
- Gerö Mály as Végrehajtó
- Zsolt Harsányi as Író
- Ilona Dajbukát as Gébicsné, Terike anyja
- Karola Zala as Unknown Role

== Bibliography ==
- Gänzl, Kurt. The Encyclopedia of the Musical Theatre: O-Z. Schirmer Books, 2001.
- Rîpeanu, Bujor. (ed.) International Directory of Cinematographers, Set- and Costume Designers in Film: Hungary (from the beginnings to 1988). Saur, 1981.
- Vilmos, Várkonyi. Jávor Pál: és a magyar film aranykora. Zima Szabolcs, 2013
