= Géza Berczy =

Hungarian actor

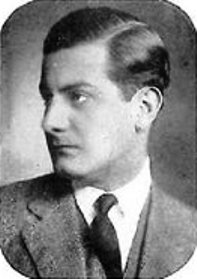
- Berczy in the 1930s.
- Born: 6 March 1902; Budapest, Austria-Hungary
- Died: 8 October 1963 (aged 61); Budapest, Hungary
- Occupation: Actor
- Years active: 1917–1964 (film)

Géza Berczy (1902–1963) was a Hungarian stage and film actor. He acted at a variety of theatres during his career and appeared in many films as a character actor in supporting roles from the silent era to the 1960s.

== Selected filmography ==
- Triumphant Life (1923)
- Dream Love (1935)
- Budapest Pastry Shop (1935)
- The Borrowed Castle (1937)
- Hotel Springtime (1937)
- Sweet Revenge (1937)
- Barbara in America (1938)
- The Henpecked Husband (1938)
- The Five-Forty (1939)
- Money Is Coming (1939)
- The Chequered Coat (1940)
- Money Talks (1940)
- Silenced Bells (1941)
- Europe Doesn't Answer (1941)
- Left-Handed Angel (1941)
- Sister Beáta (1941)
- Prince Bob (1941)
- Don't Ask Who I Was (1941)
- Deadly Kiss (1942)
- Sabotage (1942)
- Kádár Versus Kerekes (1942)
- The Dance of Death (1942)
- Time of Trial (1942)
- I Am Guilty (1942)
- Sirius (1942)
- Orient Express (1943)
- Fever (1957)

== Bibliography ==
- Connelly, Robert B. The Silents: Silent Feature Films, 1910-36, Volume 40, Issue 2. December Press, 1998.
- Laura, Ernesto G. Tutti i film di Venezia, 1932–1984. La Biennale, Settore cinema e spettacolo televisivo, 1985.
- Székely, György & Gajdó, Tamás. Magyar színháztörténet: 1920-1949. Akadémiai Kiadó, 1990.
