= József Sas =

Hungarian actor (1939–2021)

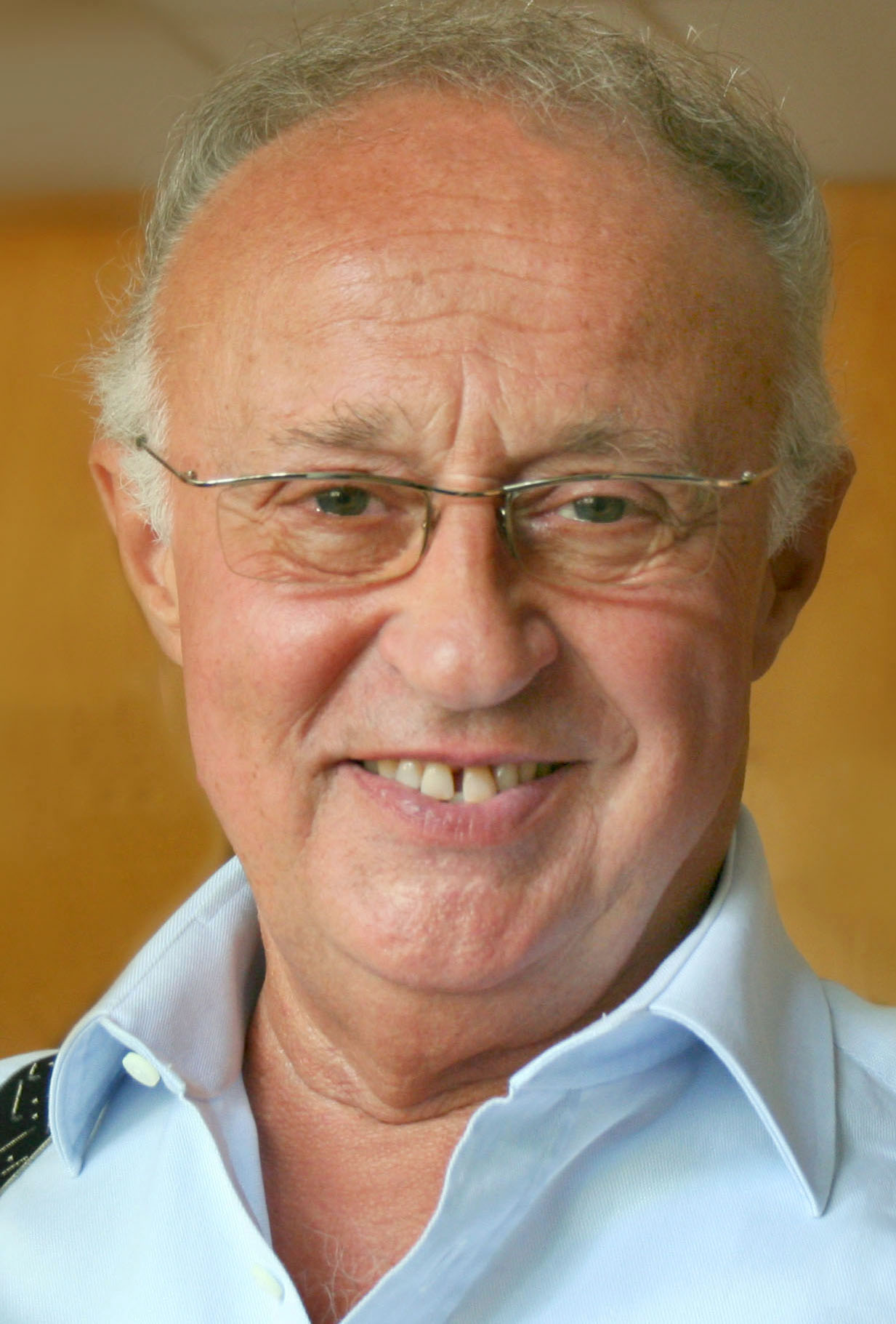
- József Sas in 2007
- Born: József Polacsek; 3 January 1939; Békéscsaba, Hungary
- Died: 17 January 2021 (aged 82); Budapest, Hungary
- Years active: 1957–2018
- Spouse: Zsuzsa Komjáti (m. 1977)

József Sas (born József Polacsek; 3 January 1939 – 17 January 2021) was a Hungarian actor, comedian and theatre manager. He was director of the Mikroszkóp Theatre from 1985 to 2009.

== Early life and career ==
József Sas was born into a family of Jewish origin as the son of Izidor Polacsek, who was an actor under the stage name Imre Sas. His father was deported to the Auschwitz concentration camp, where he was killed in 1944.

Sas finished the private drama school of Kálmán Rózsahegyi in 1957. Thereafter he joined the Kisfaludy Károly Theatre in Győr. He was a member of the Békés County Jókai Theatre since 1958, the National Theatre of Pécs since 1959, the Hungarian People's Army Art Ensemble since 1960 and the Katona József Theatre of Kecskemét since 1966.

He joined the Mikroszkóp Theatre of Budapest in 1973, the most influential cabaret theatre in Socialist Hungary. He served as long-time director of the theatre from 1985 to 2009. In this capacity, Sas was a regular contributor to the radio and TV cabaret, released several major albums, and was the author and performer of several solo evenings.

== Criminal charge ==
In June 2009, József Sas was legally sentenced to one-year prison with two-year period of probation, and a fine of HUF 300.000 on charges of seven counts of tax fraud, so, although nominated for the Kossuth Prize in that year, the submission was withdrawn. According to the data of the prosecutor's office, between 1998 and 2001 he did not pay about HUF 35 million as a tax, and he was also a debtor with a health contribution of HUF 7 million and a social security contribution of HUF 4 million, for a total of HUF 46.1 million. Sas resigned from his position of director after the verdict.

== Personal life ==
Sas married Zsuzsa Komjáti in 1977. They had a daughter Ágnes and a son Tamás. Sas announced his retirement from theatrical performance in November 2018, due to declining health. He was on vacation with his wife in Thailand in early 2019, when he had a severe bilateral stroke. A special plane transferred him to Hungary for further medical treatment. He was treated for months in the rehabilitation institute in Budakeszi, then in the Federation of Hungarian Jewish Communities (Mazsihisz) Charity Hospital.

At the end of 2020, Sas was infected during the COVID-19 pandemic in Hungary. He died on 17 January 2021, of complications from COVID-19.
