= Mária Egry =

Hungarian actress (1914–1993)

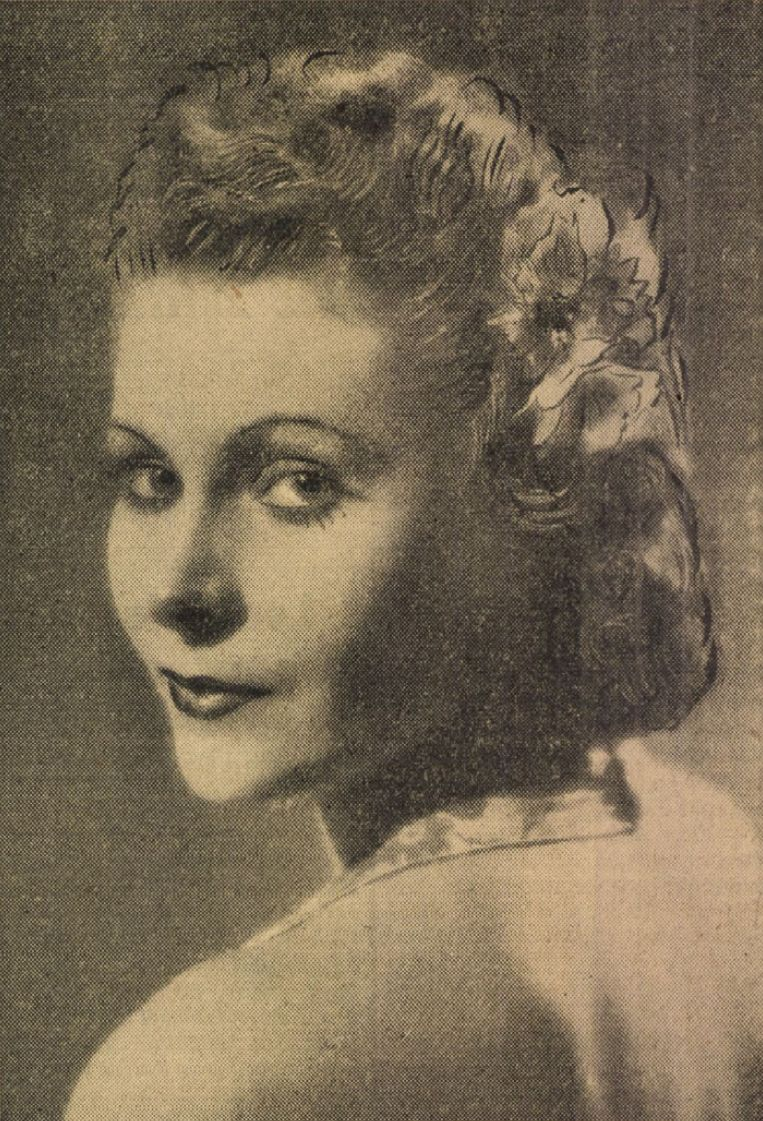
- Egry in 1938
- Born: 15 August 1914; Nagyenyed, Austria-Hungary (now Aiud, Romania)
- Died: 10 December 1993 (aged 79); Budapest, Hungary
- Occupation: Actress
- Years active: 1935–1966 (film)

Mária Egry (15 August 1914 – 10 December 1993) was a Hungarian stage and film actress. She was born in Transylvania, then part of the Austro-Hungarian Empire, which shortly afterwards was made part of Romania. She was married to the film director Emil Martonffi.

== Selected filmography ==
- The New Landlord (1935)
- The Golden Man (1936)
- Rézi Friday (1938)
- The Chequered Coat (1940)
- A Lover of the Theatre (1944)

== Bibliography ==
- Barham, Jeremey (ed.) The Routledge Companion to Global Film Music in the Early Sound Era. Taylor & Francis, 2023.
- Laura, Ernesto G. Tutti i film di Venezia, 1932–1984. La Biennale, Settore cinema e spettacolo televisivo, 1985.
