= Gerő Mály =

Hungarian actor (1884–1952)

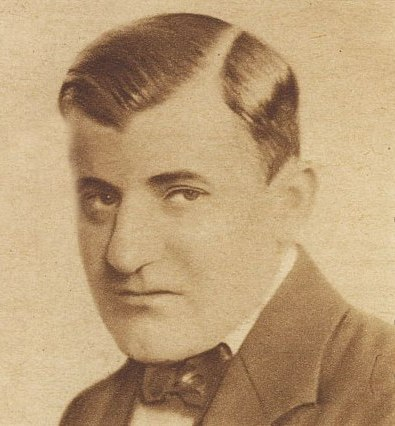
- Born: 1 August 1884; Székudvar; Austria-Hungary
- Died: July 1952 (aged 67); New York City, New York; United States
- Occupation: Film actor
- Years active: 1913-1946

Gerő Mály (1884–1952) was a Hungarian film actor who appeared in over sixty films during his career, generally in supporting roles. Mály starred in the 1929 German film Melody of the Heart, the first sound film released by the German studio UFA. In 1946 he emigrated to the United States.

== Selected filmography ==
- The Colonel (1917)
- Melody of the Heart (1929)
- Kiss Me, Darling (1932)
- Romance of Ida (1934)
- The New Landlord (1935)
- Kind Stepmother (1935)
- Hello, Budapest! (1935)
- Cafe Moscow (1936)
- Be True Until Death (1936)
- I May See Her Once a Week (1937)
- Family Bonus (1937)
- All Men Are Crazy (1937)
- An Affair of Honour (1937)
- Viki (1937)
- A Girl Sets Out (1937)
- Tales of Budapest (1937)
- Sister Maria (1937)
- Hotel Springtime (1937)
- Family Bonus (1937)
- The Poor Rich (1938)
- Man Sometimes Errs (1938)
- Magda Expelled (1938)
- The Wrong Man (1938)
- Bence Uz (1938)
- The Lady Is a Bit Cracked (1938)
- Barbara in America (1938)
- Black Diamonds (1938)
- Rosemary (1938)
- Wildflowers of Gyimes (1939)
- Stars of Variety (1939)
- Seven Plum Trees (1940)
- Matthew Arranges Things (1940)
- Yes or No? (1940)
- Money Talks (1940)
- A Szerelem nem Szégyen (1940)
- Haunting Spirit (1940)
- Three Bells (1941)
- Finally! (1941)
- Europe Doesn't Answer (1941)
- Left-Handed Angel (1941)
- Today, Yesterday and Tomorrow (1941)
- Katyi (1942)
- Kádár Versus Kerekes (1942)
- Lóránd Fráter (1942)
- Beautiful Star (1942)

== Bibliography ==
- Hardt, Ursula. From Caligari to California: Erich Pommer's Life in the International Film Wars. Berghahn Books, 1996
