= Sister Maria =

1937 film

- Directed by: Viktor Gertler
- Written by: László Bihari; István Lázár
- Produced by: Ferenc Hegedüs
- Starring: Éva Szörényi; Pál Jávor; Lili Berky
- Cinematography: István Eiben
- Music by: Szabolcs Fényes
- Production companies: Bavaria Film; Pallas Film
- Distributed by: Phõbus Film
- Release date: 4 February 1937
- Running time: 88 minutes
- Country: Hungary
- Language: Hungarian

Sister Maria (Hungarian: Mária nővér) is a 1937 Hungarian drama film directed by Viktor Gertler and starring Éva Szörényi, Pál Jávor and Lili Berky. It was shot at the Hunnia Studios in Budapest and on location around Lillafüred. The film's sets were designed by the art director Márton Vincze. It was a popular success at the box office.

== Cast ==
- Éva Szörényi as Berényi Mária
- Pál Jávor as Ladányi Mihály - födbirtokos
- Lili Berky as Mária anyja - özvegy Berényiné
- Sándor Svéd as Kibédy János
- Gyula Gózon as Orvos
- Piroska Vaszary as Zárdai tanárnõ
- Gerö Mály as Házmester
- Imre Apáthi as Tibike - János barátja
- Lajos Gárday as Gyuri bácsi
- Tibor Halmay as Vadász úr - a titkár
- Ági Donáth as Zárdai növendék
- Hilde von Stolz as Halmay Klári, egy német impresszárió özvegye
- Lajos Köpeczi Boócz as Járásbíró
- József Berky as Cigányprímás
- Béla Fáy as Bandi
- György Hajnal as Postás
- Gyula Justh as újságíró
- Karola Zala as Intézeti fõnöknõ

== Bibliography ==
- Balski, Grzegorz . Directory of Eastern European Film-makers and Films 1945-1991. Flicks Books, 1992.
- Frey, David. Jews, Nazis and the Cinema of Hungary: The Tragedy of Success, 1929-1944. Bloomsbury Publishing, 2017.
- Juhász, István. Kincses magyar filmtár 1931-1944: az eredeti forgatókönyvből 1931 és 1944 között létrejött hazai mozgóképekről. Kráter, 2007.
- Rîpeanu, Bujor. (ed.) International Directory of Cinematographers, Set- and Costume Designers in Film: Hungary (from the beginnings to 1988). Saur, 1981.
