= Gyula Justh (actor) =

Hungarian actor (1887–1955)

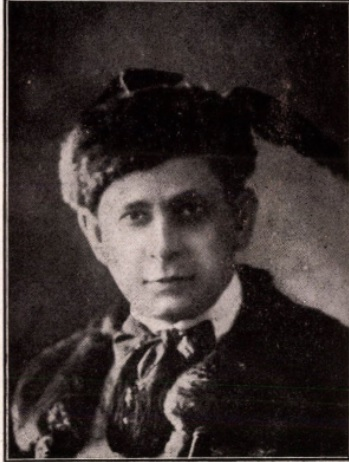
- Justh in 1929.
- Born: 24 June 1887; Budapest, Austria-Hungary
- Died: 3 June 1955 (aged 67); Budapest, Hungary
- Occupation: Actor
- Years active: 1932–1953 (film)

Gyula Justh (1887–1955) was a Hungarian stage and film actor. He appeared at a wide variety of theatres across Hungary, until his career was halted due to the Anti-Jewish Laws from 1938 onwards. He was involved with OMIKE. After the Second World War he was a member of the Madách Theatre in Budapest. In films he generally played smaller, supporting roles.

== Selected filmography ==
- Flying Gold (1932)
- Stolen Wednesday (1933)
- The Ghost Train (1933)
- Everything for the Woman (1934)
- St. Peter's Umbrella (1935)
- Villa for Sale (1935)
- The Homely Girl (1935)
- Budapest Pastry Shop (1935)
- Address Unknown (1935)
- The New Landlord (1935)
- Be True Until Death (1936)
- The Golden Man (1936)
- Cafe Moscow (1936)
- Salary, 200 a Month (1936)
- Anniversary (1936)
- The Borrowed Castle (1937)
- Modern Girls (1937)
- All Men Are Crazy (1937)
- Hotel Springtime (1937)
- A Girl Sets Out (1937)
- There Are Exceptions (1937)
- Sister Maria (1937)
- Magda Expelled (1938)
- The Lady Is a Bit Cracked (1938)
- Number 111 (1938)
- The Siege of Beszterce (1948)
- Janika (1949)
- Semmelweis (1952)
- The State Department Store (1953)
- The Sea Has Risen (1953)

== Bibliography ==
- Bondy, Frederick. The Writers, Artists, Singers, and Musicians of the National Hungarian Jewish Cultural Association (OMIKE), 1939–1944. Purdue University Press, 2016.
- Székely, György & Gajdó, Tamás. Magyar színháztörténet: 1920-1949. Akadémiai Kiadó, 1990.
