= Magda Expelled =

1938 film

- Directed by: Ladislao Vajda
- Written by: Miklós Kádár (play); László Kádár (play); Károly Nóti; Imre Éri-Halász
- Produced by: Ferenc Pless
- Starring: Ida Turay; Klári Tolnay; Antal Páger; György Nagy
- Cinematography: István Eiben
- Edited by: Viktor Bánky
- Music by: Andor Komáromy
- Production company: Harmónia Film
- Release date: 5 March 1938
- Running time: 89 minutes
- Country: Hungary
- Language: Hungarian

Magda Expelled (Hungarian: Magdát kicsapják) is a 1938 Hungarian comedy film directed by Ladislao Vajda and starring Ida Turay, Klári Tolnay and Antal Páger. The film was based on a play. In 1940 it was remade in Italy as Maddalena, Zero for Conduct with some changes (such as the recipient of the letter being from Vienna rather than London).

== Synopsis ==
A schoolgirl accidentally sends a love letter written by one of her female teachers to a handsome lawyer in London, leading to a series of misunderstandings which are eventually resolved.

== Cast ==
- Ida Turay as Magda Lévay
- Klári Tolnay as Erzsébet Makray, the teacher of commercial correspondence
- Antal Páger as Alfred Harvey
- György Nagy as István Horvay, Alfred's nephew
- Piri Peéry as the school director
- Sándor Góth as the chemistry teacher
- Gyula Gózon as Magda's father
- Márta Fónay as a student
- Valéria Hidvéghy as a student
- Gerő Mály as the janitor
- Erzsi Pártos as a student
- Kató Fényes
- Judith László
- Veronika Radó
- Magda Révfalvy
- Lili Szász
- István Dózsa
- István Falussy
- Aranka Hahnel
- Gusztáv Harasztos
- Gyula Justh
- Terus Kováts
- Márta Lendvay
- Sándor Pethes
- Mária Román
- Zsuzsa Simon
- Irén Sitkey
- Éva Somogyi
- Mária Szemlér

== Reception ==
Dorothy Masters of the New York Daily News wrote that the film "harvests a bumper crop of comedy with a plot which gathers up fun as neatly as a farmer's reaper." Harry T. Smith of The New York Times praised the performances of Turay, Tolnay, Pager and Nagy. A reviewer of Variety stated: "One of the brightest, cleverest and most amusing pictures made in Hungarian thus far. Clever directing, shrewd acting, a lot of amusing gags and a pretty plot make 80 minutes’ excellent entertainment." The Film Daily wrote: "Amusing and well paced, this new Hungarian picture will find high favor with the Magyar audience."

== Bibliography ==
- Reich, Jacqueline & Garofalo, Piero. Re-viewing Fascism: Italian Cinema, 1922-1943. Indiana University Press, 2002.
