= I May See Her Once a Week =

1937 film

- Directed by: Sándor Szlatinay
- Written by: Miklós Lörincz; Károly Nóti
- Produced by: László Vincze
- Starring: Zita Perczel; Gyula Kabos; Piroska Vaszary
- Cinematography: József Szilas
- Edited by: Andor Vidor
- Music by: Sándor Szlatinay
- Production companies: Globus Film; Sas Produkció
- Release date: 25 February 1937
- Running time: 83 minutes
- Country: Hungary
- Language: Hungarian

I May See Her Once a Week (Hungarian: Hetenként egyszer láthatom) is a 1937 Hungarian comedy film directed by Sándor Szlatinay and starring Zita Perczel, Gyula Kabos and Piroska Vaszary. The film's sets were designed by the art director Márton Vincze.

== Cast ==
- Zita Perczel as Kolozs Vera
- Gyula Kabos as Poznay
- Piroska Vaszary as Berta
- Géza Földessy as Bozóky Feri
- Márta Lendvay as Lili
- Gerö Mály as Vera apja
- Terus Kováts as Háziasszony
- Béla Salamon as Emil
- Alice Rajna as Kutyás hölgy
- Lajos Gárdonyi as Iliczky úr
- Mici Haraszti as Ágnes néni
- Mihály Dávid as Dr. Neubauer
- Piroska Kádár as Szobalány
- Emil Fenyö as Dr. Szabó Elek
- Gizi Lengyel as Dr. Szabó Elekné
- Imre Apáthi as Fiatalember a bálon
- Böske Tóth as Hölgy a zálogházban
- Lajos Köpeczi Boócz as Becsüs
- Anni Soltész as Poznay táncosa
- Ödön Bárdi as Professzor
- László Z. Molnár as Közjegyzö
- István Lontay as Zenetanár
- László Keleti as Kávéházi sakkozó

== Bibliography ==
- Juhász, István. Kincses magyar filmtár 1931-1944: az eredeti forgatókönyvből 1931 és 1944 között létrejött hazai mozgóképekről. Kráter, 2007.
- Rîpeanu, Bujor. (ed.) International Directory of Cinematographers, Set- and Costume Designers in Film: Hungary (from the beginnings to 1988). Saur, 1981.
