= The Lady Is a Bit Cracked =

1938 film

- Directed by: Ákos Ráthonyi
- Written by: Károly Aszlányi
- Produced by: Dezsõ Ákos Hamza
- Starring: Klári Tolnay; Imre Ráday; Gerö Mály
- Cinematography: József Bécsi
- Edited by: Zoltán Farkas
- Music by: Imre Farkas
- Production company: Objektív Film
- Release date: 11 October 1938
- Running time: 84 minutes
- Country: Hungary
- Language: Hungarian

The Lady Is a Bit Cracked (Hungarian: A hölgy egy kissé bogaras) is a 1938 Hungarian comedy film directed by Ákos Ráthonyi and starring Klári Tolnay, Imre Ráday and Gerö Mály. It was shot at the Hunnia Studios in Budapest. The film's sets were designed by the art director Márton Vincze.

== Synopsis ==
Bimbi is unemployed and struggling to find work. She discovers a letter of recommendation that belonged to the previous tenant of her room, and uses it to secure work as a typist. She gets a job but the letter had suggested that she was a bit eccentric, so she does her best to live up to this even after she is employed as the secretary to the boss's son.

== Cast ==
- Klári Tolnay as Takács Klári, Bimbi
- Imre Ráday as Tormássy Péter
- Gerö Mály as Kropacher, titkár
- Gyula Gózon as Tormássy, vezér
- Sándor Pethes as Gerber
- Marcsa Simon as Háziasszony
- Zoltán Makláry as Csupori, intézõ
- Gyula Köváry as Dr. Gereben
- Hilda Gobbi as Bolond
- Lenke Egyed as Csuporiné
- Ferenc Pethes as Kovács, inas
- Gusztáv Vándory as Gyomassy,államtitkár
- Éva Adorján as Titkárnõ
- László Dezsõffy as Sümegi
- István Dózsa as Novák úr
- Zoltán Fülöp as Ápoló
- Menyhért Gulyás as Enyedi cégvezetõ
- Gyula Justh as Gyári portás
- Lajos Kelemen as Paraszt
- László Misoga as Rendõr
- Dániel Skultéty as Statiszta az utcán
- Sándor Solymossy as Felszolgáló
- Lajos Sugár as Zombory, cégvezetõ
- Dezsõ Szabó as Jegyzõ
- Dezsö Szalóky as Gábor bácsi, elmegyógyintézeti ápolt

== Bibliography ==
- Juhász, István. Kincses magyar filmtár 1931-1944: az eredeti forgatókönyvből 1931 és 1944 között létrejött hazai mozgóképekről. Kráter, 2007.
- Rîpeanu, Bujor. (ed.) International Directory of Cinematographers, Set- and Costume Designers in Film: Hungary (from the beginnings to 1988). Saur, 1981.
- Vilmos, Várkonyi. Jávor Pál: és a magyar film aranykora. Zima Szabolcs, 2013
