= Man Sometimes Errs =

1938 film

- Directed by: Béla Gaál
- Written by: László Vadnay
- Produced by: József Daróczy; Dezsõ Ákos Hamza
- Starring: Antal Páger; Anna Tõkés; Margit Dajka
- Cinematography: Ferenc Gergelits
- Edited by: Zoltán Farkas
- Music by: Dénes Buday
- Production company: Hajdu Film
- Release date: 21 January 1938
- Running time: 85 minutes
- Country: Hungary
- Language: Hungarian

Man Sometimes Errs (Hungarian: Az ember néha téved) is a 1938 Hungarian comedy film directed by Béla Gaál and starring Antal Páger, Anna Tõkés and Margit Dajka. The film's sets were designed by the art director Márton Vincze.

== Cast ==
- Antal Páger as Pákay András, igazgató
- Gyula Gózon as Illés bácsi
- Anna Tõkés as Anna, Illés bácsi lánya
- Zoltán Makláry as Ilonka úr
- Eta Hajdú as Rádióénekesnõ
- Gyula Csortos as Pap István,ügyvéd
- Márton Rátkai as Ügyvédbojtár
- Angéla Körössy as Titkárnõ
- Tivadar Bilicsi as Demeter, Pákayék inasa
- Margit Dajka as Zizus, utcalány
- Gerö Mály as Zömök Lajos, zsebtolvaj
- László Dezsõffy as Detektívfelügyelõ
- Ödön Bárdi as Osztályfõnök
- Sándor Pethes as Sztancsek
- György Dénes as Kázméri
- Gyula Tapolczay as Spitzer
- Károly Huszár as A kövér úr
- György Kürthy as Rendõrtisztviselõ

== Bibliography ==
- Cunningham, John. Hungarian Cinema: From Coffee House to Multiplex. Wallflower Press, 2004.
- Juhász, István. Kincses magyar filmtár 1931-1944: az eredeti forgatókönyvből 1931 és 1944 között létrejött hazai mozgóképekről. Kráter, 2007.
- Rîpeanu, Bujor. (ed.) International Directory of Cinematographers, Set- and Costume Designers in Film: Hungary (from the beginnings to 1988). Saur, 1981.
