= Be True Until Death =

1936 film

- Directed by: Steve Sekely
- Written by: Jenõ Szatmári
- Based on: Légy jó mindhalálig by Zsigmond Móricz
- Produced by: Ferenc Szigeti
- Starring: Klári Tolnay; Kálmán Rózsahegyi; Gyula Csortos
- Cinematography: István Eiben
- Edited by: József Szilas
- Music by: Pál Gyöngy
- Production company: Lux Film
- Release date: 17 March 1936
- Running time: 82 minutes
- Country: Hungary
- Language: Hungarian

Be True Until Death (Hungarian: Légy jó mindhalálig) is a 1936 Hungarian drama film directed by Steve Sekely and starring Klári Tolnay, Kálmán Rózsahegyi and Gyula Csortos. It was shot at the Hunnia Studios in Budapest and on location in Debrecen. The film's sets were designed by the art director Márton Vincze. It was based on a 1920 novel of the same name by Zsigmond Móricz, later turned into a 1960 film Be True Until Death.

== Plot ==
Mihály "Misi" Nyilas is a student at a Debrecen boarding school; while an excellent student, his introverted demeanor and working class background makes him a target of bullying by classmates and adults alike. To earn money, he regularly visits an elderly blind man Mr. Pósalaky to read him the news; one day, Pósalaky entrusts Misi to bet on some lottery numbers that came to him in a dream. When visiting the Török family, where he used to live, he talks to the son János, and mentions the lottery ticket, but when he leaves, he forgets the lottery ticket with János.

When the lottery numbers are drawn, Pósalaky realizes his dream has gotten 4 out of the 5 numbers correct, but Misi can't find the ticket but instead finds 10 forints in his pocket, which he tries to hide from Pósalaky. When the truth comes out, Misi is accused with theft and selling the ticket. He is summoned in front of a school tribunal, where his word is placed against everyone else's, and he is repeatedly humiliated to the point where he denounces the school in anguish, screaming "I don't want to be a student in Debrecen!"

The next day, as he is recovering from a fever after the stress he's gone through, he finds out the truth: When visiting János and showing off the ticket, János stole the ticket, and instead snuck the money into Misi's pocket, but eventually admitted everything to the police. Despite his name cleared, Misi is traumatised by the ordeal, and the novel ends with him pondering on his future.

== Cast ==
- Klári Tolnay as Bella, Viola húga
- László Dévényi as Nyilas Misi
- Kálmán Rózsahegyi as Valkay tanár úr
- Gyula Csortos as Pósalaky úr
- Ferenc Kiss as Kollégiumi igazgató
- Imre Ráday as Edelényi Török János
- Gerö Mály as István bácsi, pedellus
- György Dénes as Gyéres tanár úr
- Zoltán Makláry as Kéményseprõ
- Lajos Gárday as Dorogi
- Zoltán Hosszú as Nyilas Gábor, Misi apja
- László Dezsõffy as Tanár
- Sándor Pethes as Tanár
- Kálmán Zátony as Juhász tanár úr
- Gusztáv Vándory as Orvos
- László Földényi as Postai hivatalnok
- Gyula Justh as Tanár
- Ella Gombaszögi as Dorogi Viola
- Annie Réthy as Ilonka, Edelényi húga
- Mária Simonyi as Grófnõ
- Mariska Vízváry as Törökné
- Margit Vágóné as Trafikosnõ
- Giza Báthory as Doroginé
- Erzsi Orsolya as Nyilas Gáborné
- Marcsa Simon as Pósalaky házvezetõnõje
- József Juhász as Diák
- István Primus as Szobafõnök
- Tibor Puskás as Böszörményi, diák

== Bibliography ==
- Juhász, István. Kincses magyar filmtár 1931-1944: az eredeti forgatókönyvből 1931 és 1944 között létrejött hazai mozgóképekről. Kráter, 2007.
- Parish, James Robert & Pitts, Michael R. . Film Directors: A Guide to their American Films. Scarecrow Press, 1974.
- Rîpeanu, Bujor. (ed.) International Directory of Cinematographers, Set- and Costume Designers in Film: Hungary (from the beginnings to 1988). Saur, 1981.
