= All Men Are Crazy =

1937 film

- Directed by: Viktor Gertler
- Written by: Rezső Török; Miklós Vitéz
- Based on: All Men Are Crazy by Rezső Török
- Produced by: Mrs. Miklós Vitéz
- Starring: Mária Lázár; Pál Jávor; Piroska Vaszary; Antal Páger
- Cinematography: István Eiben
- Edited by: Viktor Bánky
- Music by: Alfréd Márkus
- Production company: Reflektor Film
- Distributed by: Hungaria Pictures
- Release date: 29 September 1937
- Running time: 83 minutes
- Country: Hungary
- Language: Hungarian

All Men Are Crazy (Hungarian: A férfi mind örült) is a 1937 Hungarian comedy film directed by Viktor Gertler and starring Mária Lázár, Pál Jávor, Piroska Vaszary and Antal Páger. It was shot at the Hunnia Studios in Budapest. The film's sets were designed by the art director Márton Vincze.

== Synopsis ==
A financially struggling but gifted painter tries to maintain a higher standard of living he can afford. When a widow arrives at the hotel he courts her, trying to conceal his own lack of money from her.

== Cast ==
- Mária Lázár as Elena El Prado
- Pál Jávor as Sóváry Gábor, festõ
- Piroska Vaszary as Estella, a komorna
- Sándor Pethes as Nyári Béla, újságíró
- Antal Páger as Jónás
- György Dénes as Szállodai portás
- Gerö Mály as Csopaki Lajos
- Ilona Dajbukát as Csopakiné
- Gyula Justh as Fõpincér
- Sándor Peti as Pincér
- Lajos Köpeczi Boócz as Fõportás
- József Bihari as Teremõr
- István Dózsa as Képviselõ
- Lajos Gárday as Egy úr az utcán
- Magda Kálmán as Vendég a szállodában
- Vilmos Lengyel as Férfi a kiállításon
- Zoltán Makláry as Szabó
- József Mátray as Egy úr a kiállításon
- Erzsi Orsolya as Adminisztrátornõ
- Margit Vágóné as Özvegy Párkányné
- Karola Zala as Hölgy a kiállításon
- János Balassa as Cigányzenekari tag
- Erzsi Benedek as Szerelmes leány a szálloda éttermében
- István Bársony as István, gazda
- Gizi Hertay as vendég a Grillben
- István Lontay as Szerelmes férfi a szálloda éttermében
- Irma Lányi as Vendég a presszóban
- Endre Markovits as Portás
- Ibolya Orbán as Társaságbeli hölgy
- Ferenc Pataki as Vendég a lakodalomban
- Miklós Poór as Gyula
- Dezsõ Pártos as Képvásárló
- Aladár Róna as Olasz vendég

== Bibliography ==
- Balski, Grzegorz . Directory of Eastern European Film-makers and Films 1945-1991. Flicks Books, 1992.
- Cunningham, John. Hungarian Cinema: From Coffee House to Multiplex. Wallflower Press, 2004.
- Juhász, István. Kincses magyar filmtár 1931-1944: az eredeti forgatókönyvből 1931 és 1944 között létrejött hazai mozgóképekről. Kráter, 2007.
- Rîpeanu, Bujor. (ed.) International Directory of Cinematographers, Set- and Costume Designers in Film: Hungary (from the beginnings to 1988). Saur, 1981.
