= A Girl Sets Out =

1937 film

- Directed by: Steve Sekely
- Written by: Lajos Zilahy
- Produced by: Richárd Horovitz
- Starring: Éva Szörényi; Antal Páger; Gyula Csortos
- Cinematography: Andor Vidor
- Edited by: József Szilas
- Music by: Szabolcs Fényes
- Production company: Mûvész Film
- Release date: 23 December 1937
- Running time: 81 minutes
- Country: Hungary
- Language: Hungarian

A Girl Sets Out (Hungarian: Egy lány elindul) is a 1937 Hungarian comedy film directed by Steve Sekely and starring Éva Szörényi, Antal Páger and Gyula Csortos. It was shot at the Hunnia Studios in Budapest. The film's sets were designed by the art director Márton Vincze. It was one of a group of films featuring middle-class women restoring struggling country estates back to prosperity.

== Cast ==
- Éva Szörényi as Janka, daughter of Gara
- Antal Páger as Brigi, Son of Lomb
- Gyula Csortos as Lomb, landowner
- Lili Berky as Mrs. Gara
- Gyula Gózon as Uncle Béla, doctor
- Gerö Mály as Mihály, butler
- Mária Mezei as Didó
- Kálmán Rózsahegyi as Gara
- József Timár as Laci, Son of Gara
- Mariska Vízváry as Mrs. Lomb
- Valéria Hidvéghy as Worker
- Gyula Justh as Forester
- László Keleti as Notary
- Lajos Köpeczi Boócz as Co-tenant of Gara family
- Erzsi Pártos as Maid
- Éva Szaplonczay as Maid of Lomb's
- Ernõ Szenes as Zichy
- Lajos Ujváry as Alajos Tomaji

== Bibliography ==
- Frey, David. Jews, Nazis and the Cinema of Hungary: The Tragedy of Success, 1929-1944. Bloomsbury Publishing, 2017.
- Kelecsényi, László. Vászonszerelem: a magyar hangosfilm krónikája 1931-től napjainkig. Noran, 2007.
- Juhász, István. Kincses magyar filmtár 1931-1944: az eredeti forgatókönyvből 1931 és 1944 között létrejött hazai mozgóképekről. Kráter, 2007.
- Rîpeanu, Bujor. (ed.) International Directory of Cinematographers, Set- and Costume Designers in Film: Hungary (from the beginnings to 1988). Saur, 1981.
