= Salary, 200 a Month =

1936 film

- Directed by: Béla Balogh
- Written by: László Vadnay
- Produced by: Endre Soltész; János Zalabéri Horváth
- Starring: Pál Jávor; Erzsi Bársony; Antal Páger
- Cinematography: Andor Vidor
- Music by: Sándor Rozsnyai
- Production company: Mozgóképipari
- Release date: 10 September 1936
- Running time: 91 minutes
- Country: Hungary
- Language: Hungarian

Salary, 200 a Month (Hungarian: Havi 200 fix) is a 1936 Hungarian comedy film directed by Béla Balogh and starring Pál Jávor, Bársony Erzsi and Antal Páger. Location shooting took place around Eger in Northern Hungary. It was one of the most successful films at the Hungarian box office.

== Cast ==
- Pál Jávor as Kórody Gábor, mérnök
- Bársony Erzsi as Szabó Magda, Kórody menyasszonya
- Tivadar Uray as Demeter Kálmán, bankigazgató
- Antal Páger as Tavaszi Mátyás, gyógyszerész
- Magda Fülöp as Mayer Lili, Tavaszi menyasszonya
- Béla Salamon as Halmos Lipót, fehérnemû ügynök
- Karola Zala as Magda anyja
- Zoltán Makláry as Lili apja
- Klári Ádám as Halmos kislánya
- Sándor Pethes as Aczél, igazgató
- Géza Boross as Virág úr
- Lajos Ihász as Farkas Guidó, párbajsegéd
- István Lontay as Tassonyi Tassonyi Elek, párbajsegéd
- Lajos Sugár as Komornyik
- Gyula Justh as Anyakönyvvezetõ
- Paula Kende as Sári néni, Magda nagynénje
- Alice Rajna as Ideges hölgy a patikában
- Éva Szaplonczay as Demeter Kálmán barátnöje

== Bibliography ==
- Judson, Pieter and M. Rozenblit, Marsha L. (ed). Constructing Nationalities in East Central Europe. Berghahn Books, 2005.
- Juhász, István. Kincses magyar filmtár 1931-1944: az eredeti forgatókönyvből 1931 és 1944 között létrejött hazai mozgóképekről. Kráter, 2007.
- Rîpeanu, Bujor. (ed.) International Directory of Cinematographers, Set- and Costume Designers in Film: Hungary (from the beginnings to 1988). Saur, 1981.
