= The New Landlord =

1935 film

- Directed by: Béla Gaál
- Written by: Béla Gaál; Sándor Hunyady
- Based on: The New Landlord by Mór Jókai
- Produced by: Lajos Hirsch; Imre Tsuk
- Starring: Artúr Somlay; Mária Egry; Pál Jávor
- Cinematography: Heinrich Balasch; István Eiben
- Edited by: György Feld
- Music by: Tibor Polgár; György Ránki
- Production companies: Hirsch and Tsuk; Hunnia Filmgyár
- Release date: 21 December 1935
- Running time: 103 minutes
- Country: Hungary
- Language: Hungarian

The New Landlord (Hungarian: Az új földesúr) is a 1935 Hungarian historical romantic drama film directed by Béla Gaál and starring Artúr Somlay, Mária Egry and Pál Jávor. The film is adapted from the novel of the same title by Mór Jókai. It was shot at the Hunnia Studios in Budapest. The film's sets were designed by the art director Márton Vincze. The film concludes with the great Tisza flood of 1879.

== Cast ==
- Artúr Somlay as Ankerschmidt, lovag
- Mária Egry as Elíz, Anckersmih lánya
- Pál Jávor as Garamvölgyi Aladár
- Zita Gordon as Hermine, Anckerschmidt másik lánya
- Gyula Csortos as Garamvölgyi Ádám
- Kálmán Rózsahegyi as Kampós
- Mária Lázár as Corinna
- Tivadar Uray as Straff Péter
- Piri Peéry as Natalie
- Gerö Mály as Dr.Grisák,ügyvéd
- Zoltán Makláry as Maxenpfutsch
- György Kürthy as Bränhänsel
- Gyula Justh as Mikucsek
- Tivadar Bilicsi as Georg
- Ede Hilbert as Gyuszi
- Angéla Körössy as Cigányasszony
- Böske T. Oláh as Dajka
- Zoltán Pethö as András, õr a gáton
- Gyula Tapolczay as Fellegormi
- Lajos Gárday as Anton

== Bibliography ==
- Cunningham, John. Hungarian Cinema: From Coffee House to Multiplex. Wallflower Press, 2004.
- Juhász, István. Kincses magyar filmtár 1931-1944: az eredeti forgatókönyvből 1931 és 1944 között létrejött hazai mozgóképekről. Kráter, 2007.
- Rîpeanu, Bujor. (ed.) International Directory of Cinematographers, Set- and Costume Designers in Film: Hungary (from the beginnings to 1988). Saur, 1981.
