= Stephen Bekassy =

American actor (1907–1995)

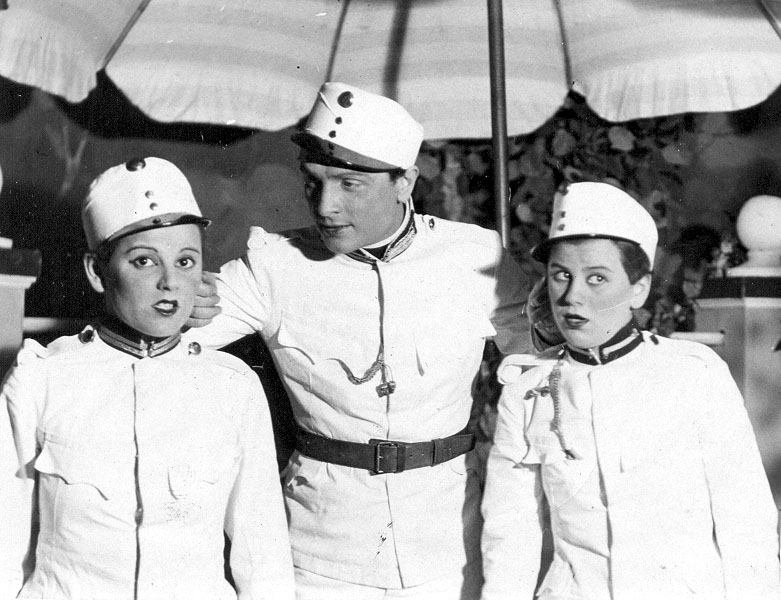
- Bekassy (center) in 1932
- Born: Békássy István; February 10, 1907; Nyíregyháza, Hungary
- Died: October 30, 1995 (aged 88); Budapest, Hungary
- Resting place: National Graveyard, Budapest, Hungary
- Other names: Istvan Bekassy
- Years active: 1930–1964
- Spouses: Teri Fejes (1931–1933); Lívia Neufeld (1936–1938); Beverly Violet Bidwell (1941–1953); Erika Beregi (1969–?); Hanna Hertelendy (?–?)
- Children: Stefan (Steffi) Dilworth

Stephen Bekassy (born István Békássy; February 10, 1907 – October 30, 1995) was a Hungarian-born American film actor.

== Career ==
Bekassy's American stage debut came in Errand for Berenice in Pittsburgh, Pennsylvania, in 1944. His American film debut was in A Song to Remember (1945).

He appeared in films such as Hell and High Water and Prisoner of War in 1954. On television he made two guest appearances on Perry Mason. In 1958 he played art expert Laslo Kovac in "The Case of the Purple Woman," and in 1959 he played murder victim Rick Stassi in "The Case of the Bartered Bikini." In 1958, he guest-starred as Count Razil in the episode "Command Performance" of the CBS situation comedy Mr. Adams and Eve. He played Monsieur Brissard, an attendant to the title character of "The Princess" Jennifer (played by Annie Farge, later spelled with an accent over the "e", or as "Fargue") in S4 E15 of "The Rifleman" which aired 7/13/1961.

== Personal life ==
Bekassy was born in Nyíregyháza, Hungary. He married Teri Fejes in 1931, but divorced in 1933. In 1936 he married Lívia Neufeld, but soon divorced in 1938. He emigrated to the United States and eventually married Beverly Violet Bidwell (1905 - 1971) on October 8, 1941, in Carson City, Nevada. Beverly Violet Bidwell wrote under the name Hagar Wilde. They later divorced. In 1969 he married Erika Beregi. He subsequently married Hanna Hertelendy (1919–2008), the widow of actor Robert Walker.

During World War II, Bekassy rescued Jewish escapees. He later worked with Radio Free Europe/Radio Liberty.

During the Red Scare, Ronald Reagan accused Stephen of being a Communist because he was Hungarian.

== Filmography ==
Year	Title	Role	Notes
1930	Kacagó asszony		
1934	Purple Lilacs	Charlie	
1935	The Homely Girl	Miklós, Éva bátyja	
1936	Barátságos arcot kérek	Tibor	
1937	Tales of Budapest	Feri, Annie öccse	
1945	A Song to Remember	Franz Liszt	
1948	Arch of Triumph	Alex	
1949	Black Magic	Viscount de Montagne	
1951	Secrets of Monte Carlo	Otto Von Herzen	
1951	Ten Tall Men	Lieutenant Kruger	
1952	Woman of the North Country	Andre Duclos	
1952	The Pathfinder	Colonel Brasseau	
1953	Fair Wind to Java	Lieutenant	
1954	Hell and High Water	Neuman	
1954	Prisoner of War	Lieutenant Georgi M. Robovnik	
1955	The Racers	Race Official	Uncredited
1955	Interrupted Melody	Comte Claude des Vignaux	
1955	The Purple Mask	Baron De Morleve	
1956	Sneak Preview		Season 1 Episode 1: "Just Plain Folks"
1956	Serenade	Russell Hanson	Uncredited
1957	Calypso Joe	Rico Vargas	
1958	The Young Lions	German Major	Uncredited
1958	The Light in the Forest	Colonel Henry Bouquet	
1959	Alfred Hitchcock Presents	Dr. Anton Rudell	Season 4 Episode 20: "The Diamond Necklace"
1960	Beyond the Time Barrier	General Karl Kruse	
1960	Pepe	Jewelry Salesman	Uncredited
1961	Bachelor Flat	Paul Probest, Artist	Uncredited
1962	Four Horsemen of the Apocalypse	Colonel Kleinsdorf	
