= Triumphant Life =

1923 film

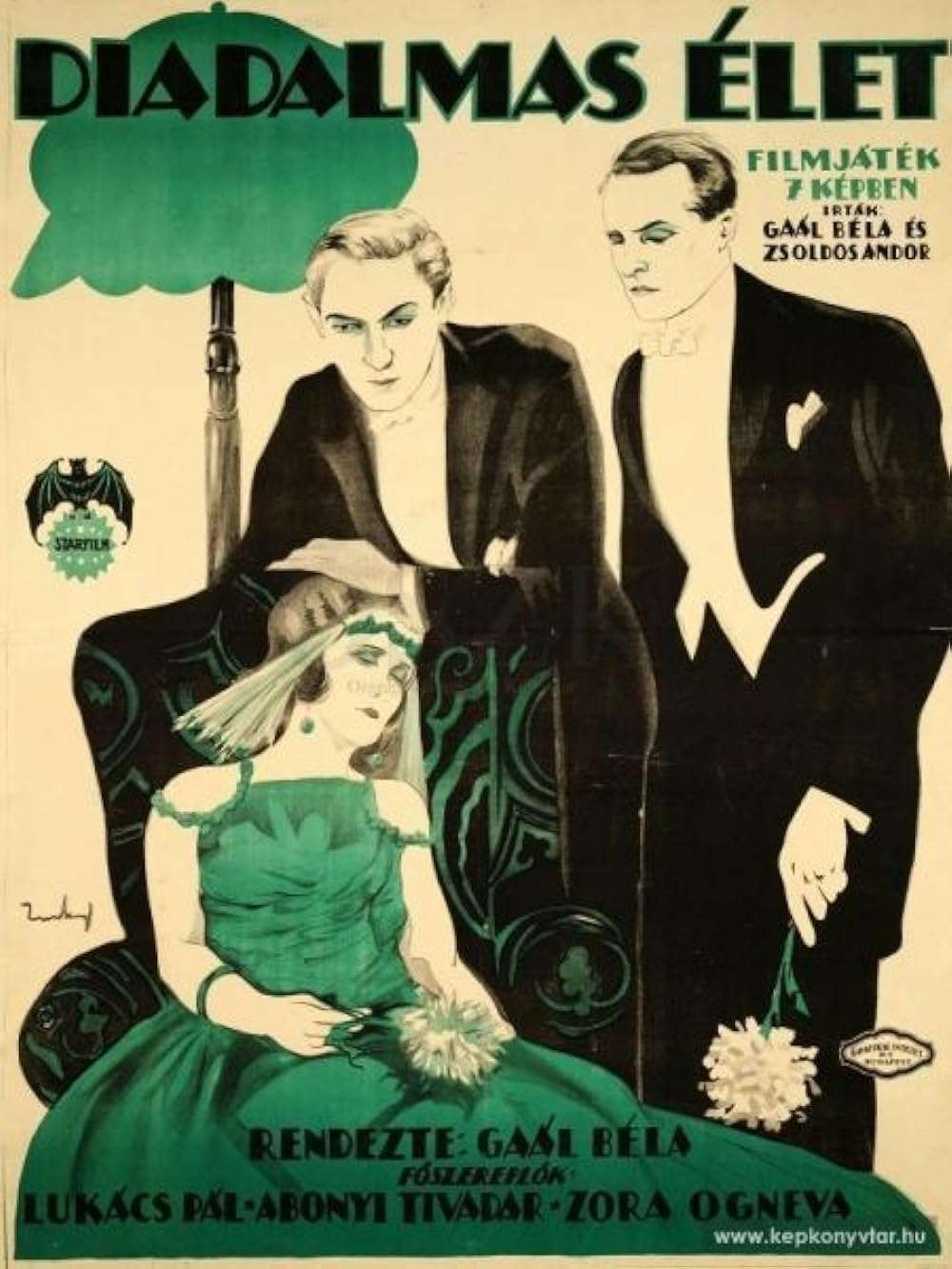
- Directed by: Béla Gaál
- Written by: Béla Gaál; Andor Zsoldos
- Produced by: Richárd Geiger
- Starring: Paul Lukas; Zora Ogneva; Tivadar Abonyi
- Cinematography: Ferenc Arany; István Kováts
- Production company: Star Filmgyár
- Release date: 21 December 1923
- Country: Hungary
- Language: Hungarian

Triumphant Life (Hungarian: Diadalmas élet) is a 1923 Hungarian silent drama film directed by Béla Gaál and starring Paul Lukas, Zora Ogneva and Tivadar Abonyi. Location shooting took place around Tata in the north of the country.

== Cast ==
- Paul Lukas as Lord Harry Arwood, londoni vasgyáros
- Zora Ogneva as Mary, Lord Arwood felesége
- Tivadar Abonyi a Teddy Bell költõ
- Lujza Székely as Kitty, Bell felesége
- Bobby Walter as Bobby, Bell fia
- Lajos Bónis as Jack, inas
- Géza Berczy
- Böske Gerõffy
- Éva Horváth
- Ilona Harmat
- Istvánné Radó
- Imre Pintér
- Ferenc Pázmán
- Ferenc Vendrey

== Bibliography ==
- Quinlan, David. Quinlan's Illustrated Directory of Film Stars. Batsford, 1996.
- Rîpeanu, Bujor. (ed.) International Directory of Cinematographers, Set- and Costume Designers in Film: Hungary (from the beginnings to 1988). Saur, 1981.
