= Béla Gaál =

Hungarian actor, film director and screenwriter

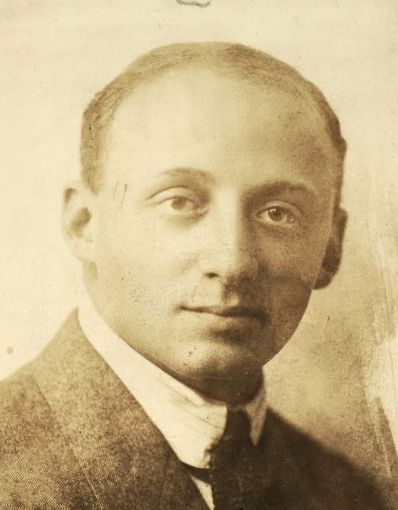
- 1923
- Born: 2 January 1893; Dombrád, Austria-Hungary
- Died: 18 February 1945 (aged 52); Dachau Concentration Camp, Nazi Germany
- Occupations: Screenwriter; Film director
- Years active: 1920 - 1939

Béla Gaál (2 January 1893 – 18 February 1945) was a Hungarian film director. His 1930 film Csak egy kislány van a világon was the first sound film to be made in Hungary.

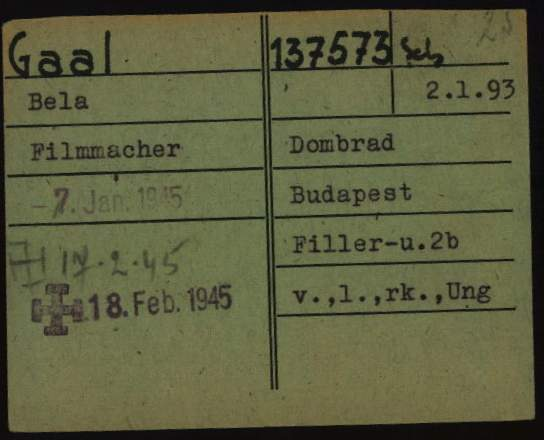
Béla Gaál's prisoner registry card at Dachau Nazi Concentration Camp.

In 1945 he was interned by the Nazis in Dachau Concentration Camp, where he would die.

== Selected filmography ==
- Triumphant Life (1923)
- Rongyosok (1926)
- Csak egy kislány van a világon (1930)
- Kiss Me, Darling (1932)
- Vica the Canoeist (1933)
- The New Relative (1934)
- Rotschild leánya (1934)
- Everything for the Woman (1934)
- The Dream Car (1934)
- The Homely Girl (1935)
- The New Landlord (1935)
- Budapest Pastry Shop (1935)
- Address Unknown (1935)
- The Golden Man (1936)
- Anniversary (1936)
- Hotel Springtime (1937)
- Tales of Budapest (1937)
- Modern Girls (1937)
- Man Sometimes Errs (1938)
- Janos the Valiant (1939)

== Bibliography ==
- Buranbaeva, Oksana & Mladineo, Vanja. Culture and Customs of Hungary. ABC-CLIO, 2011.
- Burns, Bryan. World Cinema: Hungary. Fairleigh Dickinson University Press, 1996.
- Cunningham, John. Hungarian Cinema: From Coffee House to Multiplex. Wallflower Press, 2004.
