= Cafe Moscow =

1936 film

- Directed by: Steve Sekely
- Written by: István Tamás; Steve Sekely
- Starring: Anna Tõkés; Gyula Csortos; Ferenc Kiss; Lajos Vértes
- Cinematography: Willy Goldberger; Rudolf Icsey
- Edited by: Ladislao Vajda
- Music by: Sándor László
- Production company: Patria Film
- Release date: 13 February 1936
- Running time: 84 minutes
- Country: Hungary
- Language: Hungarian

Cafe Moscow (Hungarian: Café Moszkva) is a 1936 Hungarian adventure film directed by Steve Sekely and starring Anna Tõkés, Gyula Csortos and Ferenc Kiss. Art direction was by József Pán. It is also known by the alternative title Only One Night. The film is set during the First World War on the Eastern Front between Russia and the Austro-Hungarian Empire. The film was intended to convey an anti-war message.

== Cast ==
- Anna Tõkés as Verjusa, Szuharov felesége
- Gyula Csortos as Szuharov tábornok
- Ferenc Kiss as Baklusin szárnysegéd
- Lajos Vértes as Szilágyi fõhadnagy
- József Timár as Bernát Gazsi hadnagy
- József Juhász as Kadosa Géza zászlós
- Nusi Somogyi as A Café Moszkva pénztárosnõje
- Gerő Mály as Orosz hadifogoly
- Lajos Gárdonyi as Izsák, a csempész
- Béla Bálint as Magyar ezredes
- Manyi Kiss
- Ilona Erdös
- István Berend
- István Bársony
- Gyula Szőreghy
- Gyula Justh
- Andor Sárossy
- László Keleti

== Bibliography ==
- Cunningham, John. Hungarian Cinema: From Coffee House to Multiplex. Wallflower, 2004.
- Nemeskürty, István & Szántó, Tibor. A Pictorial Guide to the Hungarian Cinema, 1901-1984. Helikon, 1985.
