= Finally! (1941 film) =

1941 film

- Directed by: Zoltán Farkas
- Written by: Gábor Vaszary
- Produced by: Péter Bajusz
- Starring: Lili Muráti; Antal Páger; Ida Turay
- Cinematography: István Eiben
- Edited by: Zoltán Farkas
- Music by: Dénes Buday
- Production company: Hajdu Film
- Release date: 4 September 1941
- Running time: 86 minutes
- Country: Hungary
- Language: Hungarian

Finally! (Hungarian: Végre!) is a 1941 Hungarian comedy film directed by Zoltán Farkas and starring Lili Muráti, Antal Páger and Ida Turay. It was shot at the Hunnia Studios in Budapest. The film's sets were designed by the art directors Márton Vincze and József Daróczy.

== Synopsis ==
The spoiled Júlia, running away from her engagement, gets stranded in the countryside and has to spend the night in the simply accommodation of two engineers in the woods. While Tibor quickly falls in love with her, Peter is initially hostile to what he sees as her selfish manner. Eventually he and Júlia begin to feel a bond.

== Cast ==
- Lili Muráti as Júlia
- Antal Páger as Horváth Péter fõmérnök
- Ida Turay as Rozi
- Tivadar Bilicsi as Erdei Tibor mérnök
- Gerö Mály as Munkavezetõ
- Béla Mihályffi as Rendõrkapitány
- Sándor Pethes as Richard, Júlia võlegénye
- Artúr Somlay as Júlia apja
- Sándor Hidassy as Rendõr
- László Makkay as Feri
- Anni Eisen as Hölgy az eljegyzésen

== Bibliography ==
- Juhász, István. Kincses magyar filmtár 1931-1944: az eredeti forgatókönyvből 1931 és 1944 között létrejött hazai mozgóképekről. Kráter, 2007.
- Rîpeanu, Bujor. (ed.) International Directory of Cinematographers, Set- and Costume Designers in Film: Hungary (from the beginnings to 1988). Saur, 1981.
- Terron, Carlo. Poltrona al buio: due anni di cinema (1941-1943). Sipario, 1996.
