= The Homely Girl =

1935 film

- Directed by: Béla Gaál; Henry Koster
- Written by: Béla Gaál; László Vadnay
- Produced by: Ferenc Pless
- Starring: Pál Jávor; Lili Muráti; Ella Gombaszögi
- Cinematography: Heinrich Balasch
- Music by: Alfréd Márkus
- Production company: Harmónia Film
- Release date: 27 September 1935
- Running time: 84 minutes
- Country: Hungary
- Language: Hungarian

The Homely Girl (Hungarian: A csúnya lány) is a 1935 Hungarian comedy film directed by Béla Gaál and Henry Koster and starring Pál Jávor, Lili Muráti and Ella Gombaszögi. The film marked Muráti's debut and launched her career as a star. It was shot at the Hunnia Studios in Budapest. The film's sets were designed by the art director Márton Vincze. It has plot similarities to Koster's 1933 German film The Ugly Girl.

== Synopsis ==
To gain revenge on the lawyer Halmi Tibor who unfairly laid the blame for an incident on her in court, the attractive Éva disguises herself as an uglier version of herself and gains employment in his office. She alternates between her two versions, one of whom he has fallen in love with. Things come to a conclusion on a trip to the Italian resort of Abbazia on the Adriatic.

== Cast ==
- Pál Jávor as Dr. Halmi Tibor
- Lili Muráti as Pál Éva
- Ella Gombaszögi as Mrs. Bogdán
- Gyula Kabos as Bogdán Artúr
- Márton Rátkai as Éva's vater
- Gyula Gózon as Plökl
- Stephen Bekassy as Miklós
- Gyula Justh as Judge
- János Doktor as secretary on court

== Bibliography ==
- Cunningham, John. Hungarian Cinema: From Coffee House to Multiplex. Wallflower Press, 2004.
- Ostrowska, Dorota, Pitassio, Francesco & Varga, Zsuzsanna. Popular Cinemas in East Central Europe: Film Cultures and Histories. Bloomsbury Publishing, 2017.
