= Marton Vincze =

Hungarian art director (1905–1941)

- Born: 1905; Budapest, Austria-Hungary
- Died: 17 January 1941 (aged 35–36); Budapest, Hungary
- Other name: Márton Vincze
- Occupation: Art Director
- Years active: 1930 - 1941 (film)

Márton Vincze (1905– 17 January 1941, Budapest) was a Hungarian art director who designed the sets for over eighty films during his career.

== Selected filmography ==
- The Blue Idol (1931)
- The Old Scoundrel (1932)
- And the Plains Are Gleaming (1933)
- Miss Iza (1933)
- The Rakoczi March (1933)
- Vica the Canoeist (1933)
- Purple Lilacs (1934)
- It Happened in March (1934)
- A Night in Venice (1934)
- Peter (1934)
- The Homely Girl (1935)
- Budapest Pastry Shop (1935)
- Address Unknown (1935)
- Dream Love (1935)
- Dreams of Love (1935)
- The New Landlord (1935)
- Miss President (1935)
- Thanks for Knocking Me Down (1935)
- Ball at the Savoy (1935)
- Anniversary (1936)
- Be True Until Death (1936)
- The Golden Man (1936)
- Girls' Dormitory (1936)
- Son of the Pusta (1936)
- It Was Me (1936)
- Tokay Rhapsody (1937)
- Sister Maria (1937)
- All Men Are Crazy (1937)
- A Girl Sets Out (1937)
- Where Do We Sleep on Sunday? (1937)
- Help, I'm an Heiress (1937)
- Tales of Budapest (1937)
- My Daughter Is Different (1937)
- The Borrowed Castle (1937)
- Hotel Springtime (1937)
- Sweet Revenge (1937)
- Mother (1937)
- I May See Her Once a Week (1937)
- Marika (1938)
- The Lady Is a Bit Cracked (1938)
- Man Sometimes Errs (1938)
- The Poor Rich (1938)
- Rézi Friday (1938)
- Rosemary (1938)
- Billeting (1938)
- Roxy and the Wonderteam (1938)
- Young Noszty and Mary Toth (1938)
- Wedding in Toprin (1939)
- The Five-Forty (1939)
- The Ball Is On (1939)
- No Coincidence (1939)
- Six Weeks of Happiness (1939)
- Mirage by the Lake (1940)
- Yes or No? (1940)
- Queen Elizabeth (1940)
- Semmelweis (1940)
- Flames (1941)
- Left-Handed Angel (1941)
- Finally! (1941)
- Sister Beáta (1941)

== Bibliography ==
- Waldman, Harry. Missing Reels: Lost Films of American and European Cinema. McFarland, 2000.
