= Budapest Pastry Shop =

1935 film

- Directed by: Béla Gaál
- Written by: Béla Gaál; István Zágon
- Produced by: Adolf Fodor; Berci Fodor
- Starring: Zita Perczel; Gyula Kabos; Artúr Somlay
- Cinematography: István Eiben
- Edited by: György Feld
- Music by: Imre Hajdú
- Production company: Phõbus Film
- Distributed by: Danubia Pictures
- Release date: 30 November 1935
- Running time: 90 minutes
- Country: Hungary
- Language: Hungarian

Budapest Pastry Shop (Hungarian: Budai cukrászda) is a 1935 Hungarian romantic comedy film directed by Béla Gaál and starring Zita Perczel, Gyula Kabos and Artúr Somlay. It was shot at the Hunnia Studios in Budapest. The film's sets were designed by the art director Márton Vincze.

== Cast ==
- Zita Perczel as Ilonka
- Anni Dobos as Judit
- Artúr Somlay as Sziráky János
- Gyula Kabos as Schulmayer, caretaker
- Gyula Gózon as Kassay, pastry shop owner
- László Perényi as Dr. Demeczky László
- Zita Gordon as Daisy
- Lajos Gárdonyi as chess player
- Zoltán Makláry as chess player
- József Kürthy as father of Demeczky
- Sándor Pethes as Szobotka, teacher
- László Földényi as junger brother of Sziráky
- Karola Zala as mother of Demeczky
- Gusztáv Pártos as butler
- Gyula Justh as exhibition organizer
- Kálmán Zátony as speaker
- János Doktor as judge
- József Mátray as headborough of Rácmedgyes
- Ferenc Pázmán as Szemerédy, under-Secretary
- Géza Berczy as guest
- Tibor Rubinyi as background actor
- Margit Aknay as maid of Daisy

== Bibliography ==
- Juhász, István. Kincses magyar filmtár 1931–1944: az eredeti forgatókönyvből 1931 és 1944 között létrejött hazai mozgóképekről. Kráter, 2007.
- Kelecsényi, László. Vászonszerelem: a magyar hangosfilm krónikája 1931-től napjainkig. Noran, 2007.
- Ostrowska, Dorota, Pitassio, Francesco & Varga, Zsuzsanna. Popular Cinemas in East Central Europe: Film Cultures and Histories. Bloomsbury Publishing, 2017.
- Rîpeanu, Bujor. (ed.) International Directory of Cinematographers, Set- and Costume Designers in Film: Hungary (from the beginnings to 1988). Saur, 1981.
