= Sister Beáta =

1941 film

- Danish poster
- Directed by: István György
- Written by: István György; Árpád Horváth; Rezsö Török
- Produced by: Béla Lévay
- Starring: Éva Szörényi; Antal Páger; Piroska Vaszary
- Cinematography: Károly Vass
- Edited by: Zoltán Farkas
- Music by: Lajos Ákom
- Production company: Léna Film
- Release date: 7 May 1941
- Running time: 89 minutes
- Country: Hungary
- Language: Hungarian

Sister Beáta (Hungarian: Beáta és az ördög) is a 1941 Hungarian drama film directed by István György and starring Éva Szörényi, Antal Páger and Piroska Vaszary. The film's sets were designed by the art director Márton Vincze.

== Synopsis ==
Count Martino is injured in an accident and is taken to a convent to recuperate. There he is cared for by the young nun Sister Beáta with whom he falls in love.

== Cast ==
- Éva Szörényi as Megesett asszony, majd a lánya, Beáta nõvér
- Antal Páger as Martino gróf
- Piroska Vaszary as Ladisla nõvér
- Margit Ladomerszky as Edda hercegnõ, Martino nõvére
- Imre Toronyi as Érsek
- Piroska Sas as Giuditta
- Miklós Gábor as Gino, Giulietta szerelmese
- Béla Mihályffi as Orvosprofesszor
- Zoltán Szakáts as Orvos
- Sándor Kömíves as Family Doctor
- Anna Füzess as Apácafõnökasszony
- Gyula Tapolczay as Martino barátja
- Gyula Kamarás as Archbishop's Secretary
- Anni Kelly as Táncos-énekesnõ
- Ferenc Szabó as Mentõs
- Viola Orbán as Kutyás apáca
- Géza Berczy as Pap
- Tibor Puskás as Triciklis fiú
- Dóra Fáy Kiss as Apáca

== Bibliography ==
- Juhász, István. Kincses magyar filmtár 1931-1944: az eredeti forgatókönyvből 1931 és 1944 között létrejött hazai mozgóképekről. Kráter, 2007.
- Rîpeanu, Bujor. (ed.) International Directory of Cinematographers, Set- and Costume Designers in Film: Hungary (from the beginnings to 1988). Saur, 1981.
