= Hotel Springtime =

1937 film

- Directed by: Béla Gaál
- Written by: László Vadnay
- Produced by: István Falus
- Starring: Anna Tõkés; Ida Turay; Antal Páger
- Cinematography: Andor Vidor
- Edited by: Klári Décsi
- Music by: Paul Abraham
- Production company: Hajdu Film
- Distributed by: Elit Film
- Release date: 19 August 1937
- Running time: 85 minutes
- Country: Hungary
- Language: Hungarian

Hotel Springtime (Hungarian: Hotel Kikelet) is a 1937 Hungarian comedy film directed by Béla Gaál and starring Anna Tõkés, Ida Turay and Antal Páger. Location shooting took place around the city of Pécs. The film's sets were designed by the art director Márton Vincze.

== Cast ==
- Anna Tõkés as Földi Mária
- Ida Turay as Zsófi
- Júlia Komár as Anna
- Antal Páger as Földi Péter
- Gyula Kabos as Megyeri Boldizsár
- Tivadar Uray as baron Torda
- Imre Palló as Ágh Feri
- Eta Hajdú as singer
- János Balassa as Marci
- Géza Berczy as hotel guest
- József Berky as Karcsi
- Ödön Bárdi as hotel guest
- Ági Donáth as seamstress
- István Dózsa as gypsy musician
- István Falussy as hotel guest
- Andor Heltai as gypsy
- Gyula Justh as receptionist
- Terus Kováts as wife of hotel guest
- Lajos Köpeczi Boócz as Zsófi's father
- Vilmos Lengyel as judge
- Gerö Mály as Mr. Rudas
- György Nagy as Dr. Horváth
- Miklós Pataki as solicitor
- Ferenc Pethes as waiter
- Sándor Pethes as Teleki
- Lajos Sugár as hotel guest
- Jenõ Szigeti as clerk
- Gyula Tapolczay as gypsy musician
- Lajos Ujváry as chef
- Margit Vágóné as mother of Ágh Feri
- Gusztáv Vándory as divorce lawyer
- Kálmán Zátony as writer

== Bibliography ==
- Juhász, István. Kincses magyar filmtár 1931-1944: az eredeti forgatókönyvből 1931 és 1944 között létrejött hazai mozgóképekről. Kráter, 2007.
- Rîpeanu, Bujor. (ed.) International Directory of Cinematographers, Set- and Costume Designers in Film: Hungary (from the beginnings to 1988). Saur, 1981.
