= Karola Zala =

Hungarian actress (1879–1970)

- Born: 1 October 1879; Nagyvárad, Austria-Hungary (now, Oradea, Romania)
- Died: 13 January 1970 (aged 90); Budapest, Hungary
- Occupation: Actress

Karola Zala (1 October 1879 – 13 January 1970) was a Hungarian actress. She was born in Nagyvárad, Austria-Hungary (now, Oradea, Romania) and died in Budapest.

== Selected filmography ==
- Spring Shower (1932)
- Kiss Me, Darling (1932)
- Miss Iza (1933)
- The Rakoczi March (1933)
- Emmy (1934)
- Spring Parade (1934)
- Dream Love (1935)
- Kind Stepmother (1935)
- Budapest Pastry Shop (1935)
- Salary, 200 a Month (1936)
- Three Dragons (1936)
- Family Bonus (1937)
- Pay Up, Madam! (1937)
- Sister Maria (1937)
- All Men Are Crazy (1937)
- Viki (1937)
- Pogányok (1937)
- Azurexpress (1938)
- The Wrong Man (1938)
- Billeting (1938)
- Two Prisoners (1938)
- Bence Uz (1938)
- Princess of the Puszta (1939)
- The Minister's Friend (1939)
- Unknown Opponent (1940)
- The Last of the Vereczkeys (1940)
- Queen Elizabeth (1940)
- Don't Ask Who I Was (1941)
- At the Crossroads (1942)
- Cadet Love (1942)
- The White Train (1943)
- Loving Hearts (1944)
- A Woman Gets a Start (1949)
- Professor Hannibal (1956)

== Bibliography ==
- Mitchell, Charles P. The Great Composers Portrayed on Film, 1913 through 2002. McFarland, 2004.
