= Sándor Peti =

Hungarian actor (1898–1973)

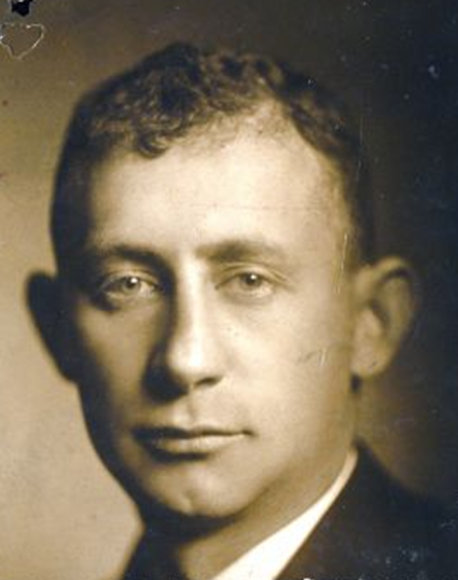
- Sándor Peti around 1920.
- Born: 6 February 1898; Kiskunhalas, Austria-Hungary
- Died: 6 April 1973 (aged 75); Budapest, Hungary
- Other name: Sándor Kanitzer
- Occupation: Actor
- Years active: 1931–1971 (film)

Sándor Peti (1898–1973) was a Hungarian stage and film actor. A character actor, he played supporting roles in many films. Of Jewish heritage, his career was restricted by the Anti-Jewish Laws imposed in 1938.

Peti was married to Ligeti Magda.

== Selected filmography ==
- The Blue Idol (1931)
- Vica the Canoeist (1933)
- It Happened in March (1934)
- Everything for the Woman (1934)
- Hello, Budapest! (1935)
- Anniversary (1936)
- Sensation (1936)
- Pay Up, Madam! (1937)
- Viki (1937)
- Mother (1937)
- All Men Are Crazy (1937)
- There Are Exceptions (1937)
- Rézi Friday (1938)
- Rosemary (1938)
- The Schoolmistress (1945)
- Gala Suit (1949)
- The Marriage of Katalin Kis (1950)
- Underground Colony (1951)
- Try and Win (1952)
- The State Department Store (1953)
- Under the City (1953)
- Young Hearts (1953)
- Fourteen Lives (1954)
- A Glass of Beer (1955)
- Love Travels by Coach (1955)
- Dollar Daddy (1956)
- Tale on the Twelve Points (1957)
- Dani (1957)
- Suburban Legend (1957)
- What a Night! (1958)
- A Quiet Home (1958)
- Up the Slope (1959)
- Crime at Dawn (1960)
- A Husband for Susy (1960)
- The Man of Gold (1962)
- Háry János (1965)
- And Then The Guy... (1966)

== Bibliography ==
- Bondy, Frederick. The Writers, Artists, Singers, and Musicians of the National Hungarian Jewish Cultural Association (OMIKE), 1939–1944. Purdue University Press, 2016.
- Nemeskürty, István & Szántó, Tibor. A Pictorial Guide to the Hungarian Cinema, 1901-1984. Helikon, 1985.
