= Zita Perczel =

Hungarian actress (1918–1996)

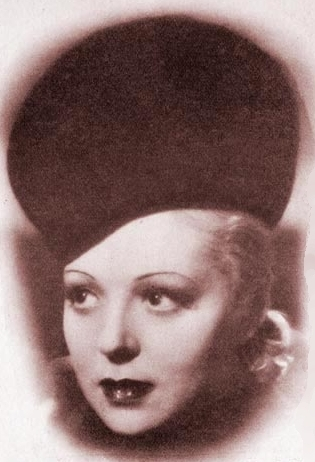
- Perczel in 1937
- Born: 26 April 1918; Budapest, Austria-Hungary
- Died: 4 April 1996 (aged 77); Budapest, Hungary
- Occupation: Film actress
- Years active: 1934–1996

Zita Perczel (26 April 1918 – 4 April 1996) was a Hungarian actress.

== Filmography ==
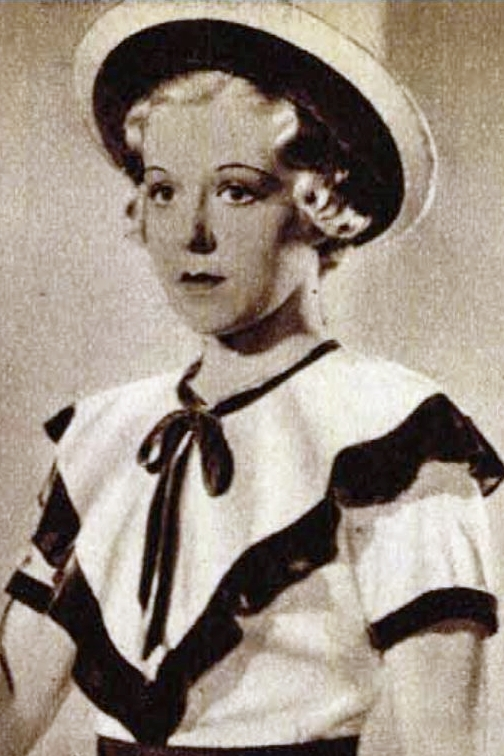
Perczel in Budapest Pastry Shop (Budai cukrászda), 1935

Year	Title	Role	Notes
1934	The Dream Car	Kitty	
1934	The New Relative	Kovács Vera	
1935	Budapest Pastry Shop	Ilonka, Kassay lánya	
1936	Danube Rendezvous	Tamássy Erzsi	
1937	An Affair of Honour	Baba, Virág lánya	
1937	I May See Her Once a Week	Kolozs Vera	
1938	Marika	Ella	
1956	Assassins et voleurs	La princesse Dourachenko - la kleptomane	
1962	À fleur de peau	Irène	
1980	The Heiresses	Teréz	
1982	Dögkeselyű	Szántóné, Roska Erzsébet, Mária testvére	
1992	A nagy postarablás	öregasszony	
1996	Törvénytelen		
1997	Roseanna's Grave	Old Woman In Court	(final film role)

== Archive footage ==
- A Jávor (1987)

== Bibliography ==
- Burns, Bryan. World Cinema: Hungary. Fairleigh Dickinson University Press, 1996.
