= László Vadnay =

Hungarian screenwriter

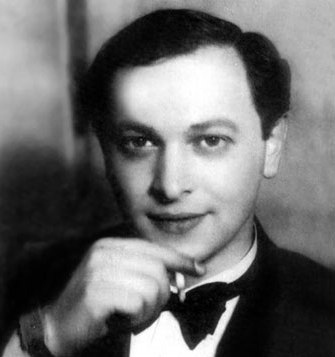
- Born: 6 June 1904; Budapest, Austria-Hungary
- Died: 18 April 1967 (aged 62); Budapest, Hungary
- Occupation: Screenwriter
- Years active: 1932–1966

László Vadnay (1904–1967), or Ladislaus Vadnai, was a Hungarian screenwriter. He worked in the United States for a number of years before returning to Hungary.

== Selected filmography ==
- Kiss Me, Darling (1932)
- Vica the Canoeist (1933)
- The Dream Car (1934)
- Everything for the Woman (1934)
- The Homely Girl (1935)
- Car of Dreams (1935)
- Villa for Sale (1935)
- Fräulein Lilli (1936)
- Sensation (1936)
- Salary, 200 a Month (1936)
- Sensation (1936)
- Hotel Springtime (1937)
- Tales of Budapest (1937)
- An Affair of Honour (1937)
- Josette (1938)
- Man Sometimes Errs (1938)
- Seven Sinners (1940)
- Flesh and Fantasy (1943)
- Uncertain Glory (1944)
- The Big Show-Off (1945)
- Copacabana (1947)
- The Great Rupert (1950)
- No Time for Flowers (1952)
- I Love Melvin (1953)
- Ten Thousand Bedrooms (1957)
- It Happened in Athens (1962)
- Dime with a Halo (1963)

== Bibliography ==
- McNulty, Thomas. Errol Flynn: The Life and Career. McFarland, 2004.
