= Soldiers of the Emperor =

1918 film

- Directed by: Béla Balogh
- Written by: Richárd Falk; Imre Földes (play)
- Starring: Lya De Putti; Sándor Virányi; Aladár Ihász
- Release date: 1918
- Country: Hungary
- Languages: Silent; Hungarian intertitles

Soldiers of the Emperor (Hungarian: A Császár katonái) is a 1918 Hungarian silent drama film directed by Béla Balogh and starring Lya De Putti, Sándor Virányi, and Aladár Ihász.

== Cast ==
- Lya De Putti
- Sándor Virányi
- Aladár Ihász
- Lajos Szóke
- Lajos Szõke
- Zsigmond Gere
- István Ihász

== Bibliography ==
- Bock, Hans-Michael & Bergfelder, Tim. The Concise CineGraph. Encyclopedia of German Cinema. Berghahn Books, 2009.
