= Tales of Budapest =

1937 film

Pesti mese
- Directed by: Béla Gaál
- Written by: László Vadnay
- Produced by: József Daróczy; István Falus
- Starring: Ida Turay; Antal Páger; Gyula Kabos
- Cinematography: István Eiben
- Edited by: Zoltán Farkas
- Music by: Paul Abraham
- Production company: Hunnia Filmstúdió
- Release date: 27 May 1937
- Running time: 86 minutes
- Country: Hungary
- Language: Hungarian

Tales Of Budapest (Hungarian: Pesti mese) is a 1937 Hungarian comedy film directed by Béla Gaál and starring Ida Turay, Antal Páger and Gyula Kabos. It was shot at the Hunnia Studios in Budapest. The film's sets were designed by the art director Márton Vincze.

== Cast ==
- Ida Turay as Kis Klári, Copfos
- Antal Páger as Kubik
- Gyula Kabos as Vadász Lehel, az Atlantic Bank igazgatója
- Anni Dobos as Annie
- Stephen Bekassy as Feri, Annie testvére
- Mária Mezei as Éva
- Ilona Kökény as Vásárló hölgy
- Gerő Mály as A vásárló hölgy férje
- Manyi Kiss as Szubrett
- Kamill Feleki as Tánctanár
- Lajos Köpeczi Boócz as Háziúr
- Margit Vágóné as Szobaasszony
- Sándor Pethes as Vegetáriánus
- Gusztáv Vándory as Banktisztviselö
- Gyula Tapolczay as Artista
- Nusi Somogyi as Artistáné
- János Balassa as Költõ
- Ferenc Pethes as Tanár
- Ödön Bárdi as Szakállas tanuló
- Tivadar Bilicsi as Fõpincér
- Kató Antalffy as Lány a kalapszalonban
- Ági Donáth as Lány a kalapszalonban
- Éva Libertiny as Lány a kalapszalonban
- Mária Román as Lány a kalapszalonban
- Éva Bornemissza as Cukrászlány

== Bibliography ==
- Juhász, István. Kincses magyar filmtár 1931-1944: az eredeti forgatókönyvből 1931 és 1944 között létrejött hazai mozgóképekről. Kráter, 2007.
- Rîpeanu, Bujor. (ed.) International Directory of Cinematographers, Set- and Costume Designers in Film: Hungary (from the beginnings to 1988). Saur, 1981.
