= Andor Vidor =

Hungarian cinematographer (1912–1943)

- Born: 14 April 1912; Budapest, Austria-Hungary
- Died: c. March 1943; Reichskommissariat Ukraine
- Occupation: Cinematographer
- Years active: 1935–1939 (film)

Andor Vidor (1912–1943) was a Hungarian cinematographer. Vidor was born in Budapest of Jewish heritage, the nephew of screenwriter Ladislaus Vajda and a cousin of Ladislao Vajda. He trained under the guidance of István Eiben and went on to shoot a dozen Hungarian films during the 1930s, generally romantic comedies. His career was halted by the introduction of the Anti-Jewish Laws of 1938 aimed to remove those of Jewish ethnicity from the Hungarian film industry. His final work was as editor on the 1939 sports comedy film 3:1 a szerelem javára The exact date and location of his death are unclear, although he was working as a forced labourer in Axis-controlled territory.

== Selected filmography ==
- Hello, Budapest! (1935)
- Salary, 200 a Month (1936)
- The Mysterious Stranger (1937)
- 120 Kilometres an Hour (1937)
- I May See Her Once a Week (1937)
- The Borrowed Castle (1937)
- A Girl Sets Out (1937)
- My Daughter Is Different (1937)
- Modern Girls (1937)
- Help, I'm an Heiress (1937)
- Hotel Springtime (1937)
- The Village Rogue (1938)
- 3:1 a szerelem javára (1939)

== Bibliography ==
- Horák, Magda. A magyar értelmiség veszteségei az 1940-es években. BékésPrint, 1994.
- Rîpeanu, Bujor. (ed.) International Directory of Cinematographers, Set- and Costume Designers in Film: Hungary (from the beginnings to 1988). Saur, 1981.
- Schwab, Jan Tilman. Fussball im Film: Lexikon des Fussballfilms, Volume 2. Belleville, 2006.
