= Mária Mezei =

Hungarian actress (1909–1983)

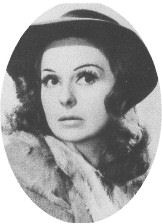
- Mezei in 1940
- Born: 16 October 1909; Kecskemét, Austria-Hungary (now Hungary)
- Died: 20 April 1983 (aged 73); Budapest, Hungary
- Occupation: Actress
- Years active: 1933–1966

Mária Mezei (16 October 1909 – 20 April 1983) was a Hungarian film actress. She appeared in more than 30 films between 1936 and 1970.

== Selected filmography ==
- The Golden Man (1936)
- Tales of Budapest (1937)
- A Girl Sets Out (1937)
- 120 Kilometres an Hour (1937)
- Castle in Transylvania (1940)
- One Night in Transylvania (1941)
- Flames (1941)
- I Am Guilty (1942)
- Janika (1949)
- The State Department Store (1953)
- Springtime in Budapest (1955)
- The Bridge of Life (1956)
- Two Confessions (1957)
- Édes Anna (1958)
- Danse Macabre (1958)
- Young Noszty and Mary Toth (1960)
- Sunshine on the Ice (1961)
- Lady-Killer in Trouble (1964)
- Forbidden Ground (1968)
