= The Golden Man (film) =

1936 film

- Directed by: Béla Gaál
- Written by: Béla Gaál; Sándor Hunyady
- Based on: The Man with the Golden Touch by Mór Jókai
- Produced by: Lajos Hirsch; Imre Tsuk
- Starring: Ferenc Kiss; Tivadar Uray; Gyula Csortos
- Cinematography: István Eiben
- Edited by: József Szilas
- Music by: Tibor Polgár; György Ránki
- Production companies: Hirsch and Tsuk; Hunnia Filmgyár
- Release date: 18 December 1936
- Running time: 97 minutes
- Country: Hungary
- Language: Hungarian

The Golden Man (Hungarian: Az aranyember) is a 1936 Hungarian historical drama film directed by Béla Gaál and starring Ferenc Kiss, Tivadar Uray and Gyula Csortos. The film is an adaptation of the 1872 novel The Man with the Golden Touch by Mór Jókai. It was shot at the Hunnia Studios in Budapest and on location around Budafok and the Romanian island of Ada Kaleh on the Danube. The film's sets were designed by the art director Márton Vincze.

== Cast ==
- Ferenc Kiss as Tímár Mihály
- Tivadar Uray as Krisztyán Tódor
- Gyula Csortos as Brazovich Athanáz
- Mária Mezei as Athália, Brazovich lánya
- Attila Petheö as Ali Csorbadzsi
- Kálmán Rózsahegyi as Fabula
- Márta Kormosas Timea
- Anna Füzess as Tereza mama
- Mária Egry as Noémi
- Szeréna Sziklay as Brazovichné
- Lajos Básti as Kadisa fõhadnagy
- Kálmán Zátony as Ezredes
- Gyula Justh as Kereskedõ
- Vilmos Szirmay as Inas
- Gusztáv Vándory as ügyvéd
- József Bihari as Galambos - halászmester
- Lajos Sugár as Falusi jegyzõ
- Emil Fenyö as A török naszád parancsnoka
- Lidia Beöthy as Kasszírnõ
- József Koroknay as Vezetõ segéd
- Tivadar Bilicsi as Sajkás tiszt
- Kató Antalffy as Athalie barátnõje
- Éva Bornemissza as Athalie barátnõje
- Mária Román as varrogató lány, Athalie barátnõje

== Bibliography ==
- Cunningham, John. Hungarian Cinema: From Coffee House to Multiplex. Wallflower Press, 2004.
- Juhász, István. Kincses magyar filmtár 1931-1944: az eredeti forgatókönyvből 1931 és 1944 között létrejött hazai mozgóképekről. Kráter, 2007.
- Rîpeanu, Bujor. (ed.) International Directory of Cinematographers, Set- and Costume Designers in Film: Hungary (from the beginnings to 1988). Saur, 1981.
