= It Happened in March =

1934 Hungarian film

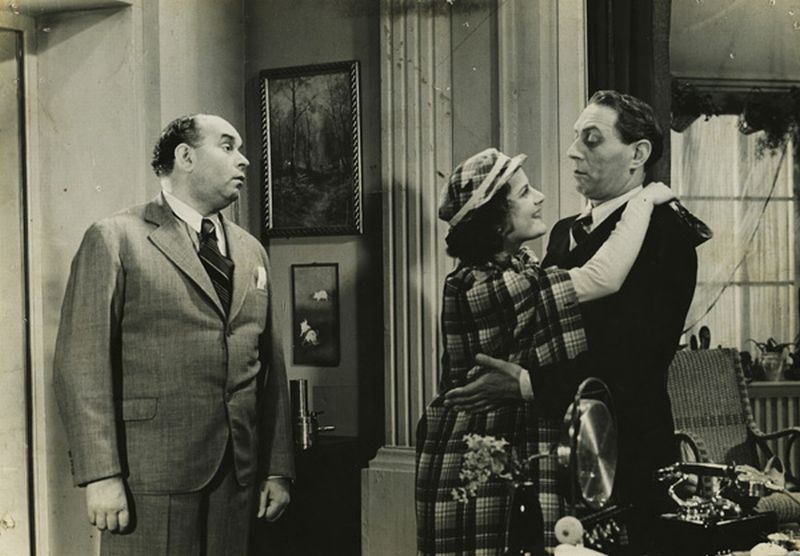
- Directed by: Emil Martonffi
- Written by: Imre Füredi; Emil Martonffi
- Produced by: László Sas
- Starring: Ida Turay; Imre Ráday; Lili Berky
- Cinematography: István Eiben
- Edited by: István György
- Music by: Zoltán Mártonffy; György Pán; Károly Stephanides
- Production company: Hermes Film
- Release date: 4 March 1934
- Running time: 76 minutes
- Country: Hungary
- Language: Hungarian

It Happened in March (Hungarian: Márciusi mese) is a 1934 Hungarian musical comedy film directed by Emil Martonffi and starring Ida Turay, Imre Ráday and Lili Berky. It was shot at the Hunnia Studios in Budapest. The film's sets were designed by the art director Márton Vincze.

== Cast ==
- Ida Turay as Matyika
- Irén Demkó as Lili
- Lili Berky as Widow Mrs. Balogh Péter
- Jenö Törzs as Dr. Balla Tamás Managing Director
- Imre Ráday as Balla Győző Engineer
- Gyula Kabos as Kende Bank Manager
- Gyula Gózon as Gida Sándor Colonel
- Gusztáv Vándory as Kéri Manager
- Ödön Bárdi as Confirmed bachelor
- István Dózsa as Dr. Steinkopf Szilárd Bachelor
- Ferenc Pataki as Confirmed bachelor
- Sándor Peti as Clerk
- Elvira Horváthy as Florist
- Lajos Gárday as Smallholder
- Elemér Baló as Waiter
- József Kishonti as the Italian singer

== Bibliography ==
- Juhász, István. Kincses magyar filmtár 1931-1944: az eredeti forgatókönyvből 1931 és 1944 között létrejött hazai mozgóképekről. Kráter, 2007.
- Koerner, Andras. How They Lived: The Everyday Lives of Hungarian Jews, 1867-1940. Central European University Press, 2015.
- Rîpeanu, Bujor. (ed.) International Directory of Cinematographers, Set- and Costume Designers in Film: Hungary (from the beginnings to 1988). Saur, 1981.
