= Modern Girls (1937 film) =

1937 film by Béla Gaál

- Directed by: Béla Gaál
- Written by: Yolanda Foldes (novel); István Mihály; Gábor Vaszary
- Starring: Lia Szepes; Jenő Pataky; Steven Geray; Lili Berky
- Cinematography: Andor Vidor
- Music by: Paul Abraham
- Production company: Budapest Film
- Release date: 19 November 1937
- Running time: 91 minutes
- Country: Hungary
- Language: Hungarian

Modern Girls or Today's Girls (Hungarian: Mai lányok) is a 1937 Hungarian comedy film directed by Béla Gaál and starring Lia Szepes, Jenő Pataky and Steven Geray. The film may be best remembered for Magda Gabor's appearance in a supporting role.

== Cast ==
- Lia Szepes as Hanzéli Zsuzsi
- Jenő Pataky as Németh Péter
- Steven Geray as Székely Feri (credited as Gyergyai István)
- Lili Berky as Péter
- Magda Kun as Cili
- Margit Dajka as Kati (credited as Dayka Margit)
- Magda Gabor as Lenke (credited as Gábor Magda)
- Ági Donáth as Mária
- Eva Biro as Viola (credited as Bíró Éva)
- Gyula Justh as asztalos
- József Juhász as asztalossegéd
- László Dezsőffy as magándetektív
- Gusztáv Vándory as anyakönyvvezető
- István Dózsa as árverező
- Lajos Köpeczi Boócz as ügyvéd
- Tibor Puskás as inas

== Bibliography ==
- Nemeskürty, István & Szántó, Tibor. A Pictorial Guide to the Hungarian Cinema, 1901-1984. Helikon, 1985.
- Phillips, Alastair & Vincendeau, Ginette. Journeys of Desire: European Actors in Hollywood. British Film Institute, 2006.
