= Anniversary (1936 film) =

1936 film

- Directed by: Béla Gaál
- Written by: Imre Földes; Miklós Vitéz
- Produced by: Mrs. Miklós Vitéz
- Starring: Antal Páger; Imre Ráday; Gábor Rajnay
- Cinematography: István Eiben
- Edited by: László Bognár
- Music by: Mihály Nádor
- Production company: Reflektor Film
- Release date: 25 December 1936
- Running time: 102 minutes
- Country: Hungary
- Language: Hungarian

Anniversary (Hungarian: Évforduló) is a 1936 Hungarian comedy film directed by Béla Gaál and starring Antal Páger, Imre Ráday and Gábor Rajnay. It was shot at the Hunnia Studios in Budapest. The film's sets were designed by the art director Márton Vincze. It was one of the most successful films at the Hungarian box-office.

== Cast ==
- Antal Páger as Dr. Gergely Péter tanársegéd
- Imre Ráday as Bálint István, újságíró
- Gábor Rajnay as Dr. Máthé Tibor, ügyvéd
- Zita Gordon as Mária, Gergely felesége
- Imre Toronyi as Dr. Boronkay, orvosprofesszor
- Júlia Komár as Komlós Vera, irodakisasszony
- Lidia Beöthy as Fõápolónõ
- Éva Szaplonczay as Ismeretlen lány
- Piri Ádám as Bárénekesnõ
- Marcsa Simon as Máthé házvezetõnõje
- Elemér Baló as öreg nyomdász
- János Balassa as Mándik, újságíró
- István Berend as Orvostanhallgató
- István Bondy as Altiszt
- Lajos Csele as Orvostanhallgató
- László Dévényi as Ferike
- Lajos Gárday as Kórházi portás
- József Gonda as Ügyvéd
- Emil Fenyö as Törvényszéki biró
- Gyula Justh as Korongi Gábor
- István Lontay as Bárpincér
- Sándor Pethes as Szakértõ
- Sándor Peti as Samu, irodaszolga
- Margit Aknay as Gergelyék szobalánya
- Kató Antalffy as Erzsi, Gergelyék szobalánya
- Gizi Hertay as Szerkesztõségi alkalmazott
- Adrien Hollán as statiszta a Tabarinban
- Ferike Vidor as Korongi Gáborné
- Gusztáv Vándory as Idegorvos
- Kálmán Zátony as Idegorvos

== Bibliography ==
- Judson, Pieter and M. Rozenblit, Marsha L. (ed). Constructing Nationalities in East Central Europe. Berghahn Books, 2005.
- Juhász, István. Kincses magyar filmtár 1931-1944: az eredeti forgatókönyvből 1931 és 1944 között létrejött hazai mozgóképekről. Kráter, 2007.
- Rîpeanu, Bujor. (ed.) International Directory of Cinematographers, Set- and Costume Designers in Film: Hungary (from the beginnings to 1988). Saur, 1981.
