= Ida Turay =

Hungarian actress (1907–1997)

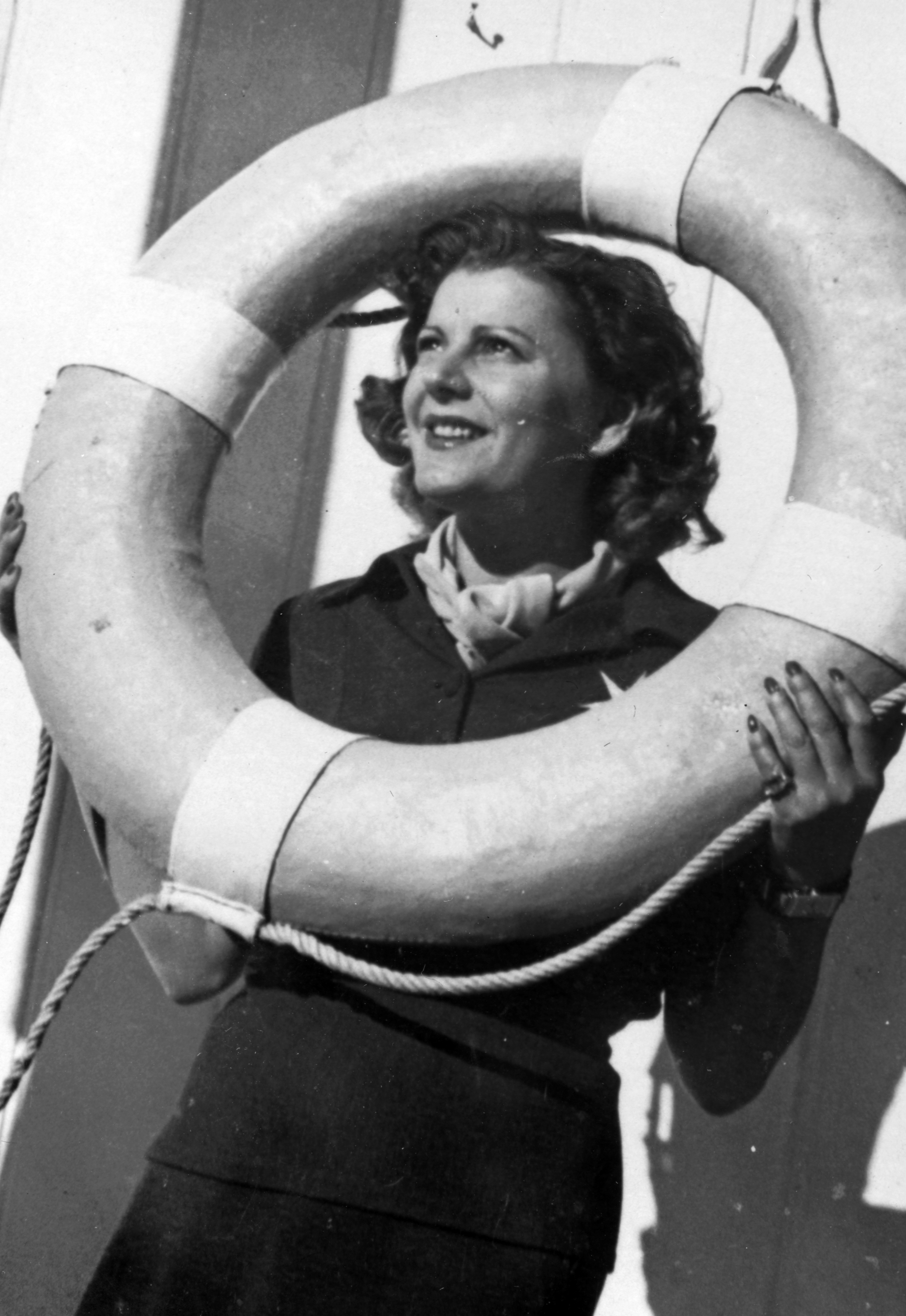
- Ida Turay in 1938
- Born: Ida Turmayer; 28 September 1907; Rákospalota, Austro-Hungarian Empire
- Died: 2 June 1997 (aged 89); Budapest, Hungary
- Occupation: Actress
- Years active: 1929–1996 (film)

Ida Turay (Born Ida Turmayer; 28 September 1907 – 2 June 1997) was a Hungarian film actress known for her roles in comedies during the 1930s. She was the sister of the actress and singer Clara Tabody. She was married to the writer István Békeffy.

== Selected filmography ==
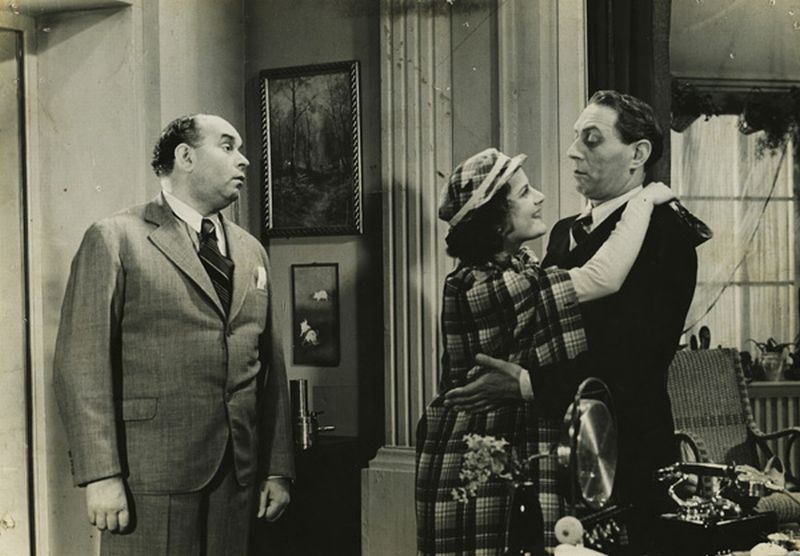
Turay in It Happened in March (1934).

- Prisoner Number Seven (1929)
- The Rakoczi March (1933)
- The New Relative (1934)
- It Happened in March (1934)
- Romance of Ida (1934)
- Thanks for Knocking Me Down (1935)
- Villa for Sale (1935)
- Under Blazing Heavens (1936)
- My Daughter Is Different (1937)
- Tales of Budapest (1937)
- Hotel Springtime (1937)
- The Borrowed Castle (1937)
- Rézi Friday (1938)
- Magda Expelled (1938)
- Rosemary (1938)
- No Coincidence (1939)
- Seven Years Hard Luck (1940)
- Seven Plum Trees (1940)
- Finally! (1941)
- The Gyurkovics Boys (1941)
- Three Bells (1941)
- Costume Ball (1942)
- Magdolna (1942)
- Egy szoknya, egy nadrág (One Skirt, One Trousers) (1943)
- Muki (1944)
- Masterless Woman (1944)
- The Siege of Beszterce (1948)
- Janika (1949)
- Déryné (1951)
- The State Department Store (1953)
- The Liar (1961)
- Csínom Palkó (1973)
- Oh, Bloody Life (1984)

== Bibliography ==
- Cunningham, John. Hungarian Cinema: From Coffee House to Multiplex. Wallflower Press, 2004.
- Ostrowska, Dorota, Pitassio, Francesco & Varga, Zsuzsanna. Popular Cinemas in East Central Europe: Film Cultures and Histories. Bloomsbury Publishing, 2017
