= Tom Hnatiw =

Tom Hnatiw in August 2007

Thomas Gregory Michael Hnatiw (pronounced "Na-chew"; December 13, 1958 – 30 July 2012, in Oakville, Ontario, Canada) was a Canadian motor journalist and live motor race announcer.

Tom Hnatiw was best known as co-presenter of the TV show Dream Car Garage on Speed Channel alongside Peter Klutt from 2000 to 2008. There he was famous for the phrase "Do you need a car like this? No. Do you want a car like this???" Further he was involved with the programmes Hard Drive and Sports Car Revolution. He was the founder and owner of the Internal Combustion Group, a television production company based around automotive programming. Altogether he was involved in the production of over 500 shows related to the automotive world and co-owner of a 5000 square-foot race shop.

He wrote several widely read automotive columns and was featured in newspapers such as the Toronto Star.

He also was a well known live race announcer, e.g., for the SRT Viper Cup series of the North American Road Racing Association, for which he also was a spokesperson. Hnatiw himself, raced for 15 years and was Canadian GT3 co-champion in 1998.

On 30 July 2012 he died in a hospital in Oakville, Ontario from kidney failure, aged 53. He left behind his wife of 23 years Debbie and his two sons Nick and Wyatt. "His genuine passion for racing, concern for the well-being of drivers, and the way he made every competitor feel as welcome," said NARRA President Tom Antonelli in a farewell note. "His beaming smile, and that unmistakable voice, will be truly missed."
