= The Care of Your Car =

1947 British television programme

The Care of Your Car is a British television programme which aired on the BBC during 1947. As the title suggests, the series was about looking after a car. The episodes aired irregularly in a 20-minute time-slot. The series is believed to be lost.

== Episode list ==
- "The Chassis" (26 January 1947)
- "Steering, Brakes and Tyres" (30 March 1947)
- "The Engine" (27 April 1947)
- "More About the Engine" (1 June 1947)
- "Electrical Equipment" (4 July 1947)
