= Kálmán Rózsahegyi =

Hungarian actor (1873–1961)

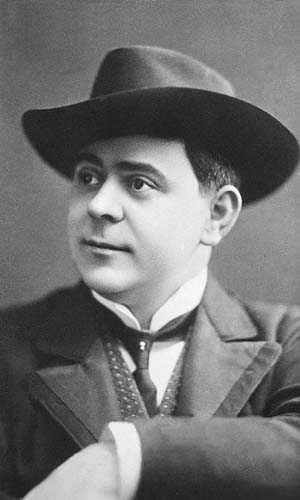

Kálmán Rózsahegyi (6 October 1873, in Pest – 27 August 1961) was a Jewish Hungarian actor and teacher.

He descended from a family of theatre actors; his father, Ödön Rózsahegyi performed in the countryside. Kálmán Rózsahegyi also began his career performing in the countryside, but in 1898 he was hired by the Hungarian National Theatre. Between 1900 and 1935 he was a member of the National Theatre, from 1923 as a permanent member.

With his wife, Angéla Hevesi, he founded his own private drama school, which was the place of learning for many famous actors.

== Biography and works ==
Rózsahegyi was one of the most notable representatives of realist theatre; a person who was not an artist of words, but rather of simple, natural and direct plays. The range of his work was broad: his works covered all the shades of low comedy and sensual humor.

He was born in Endrőd, Békés on October 6, 1873. Following in the footsteps of his father, Ödön Rózsahegyi, he became an actor, and he graduated as an actor from drama school. He began his acting career in 1892 in the troupe of Sándor Dobó, and then worked in Debrecen and Cluj-Napoca. In 1898 he joined the Hungarian Theatre, where he played parts in operettas. At the turn of the century he entered the National Theatre, to which he loyally bonded, a bond the institution reciprocated when he was elected into permanent membership in 1923. On the course of his various appearances he stayed with the National Theatre until his retirement in 1935.

Rózsahegyi's name became popular in the 1910s and 20s as a cabaret artist, thanks to which he received renown abroad as well. In 1926 he played a part in the United States. After 1935 he acted in an assortment of private theatres.

The drama school that he founded with his wife, Angéla Hevesi, remains famous to this day. He later taught there with his girls up until his death. He was an outstanding teacher: many notable actors graduated from his school (such as Róbert Rátonyi, Juci Komlós, and József Sas).

Due to his ancestry he was prevented from acting in the Second World War, and after 1945 Tamás Major forbade him from rejoining the National Theatre. In the following decade he acted variously at the Pest, the Hungarian Comedy, the Hungarian, the Budapest Operetta and the Madách Theatres. He was at home in every genre: operettas, comedies, cabarets and classical drama.

He played as one of the gravediggers in Shakespeare's Hamlet, the fool of King Lear, and Gobbo in The Merchant of Venice.

Kalman's students liked the uniquely voiced, smiling man just as much as his audience. He was not forgotten by his birth town, who elected him an honorary citizen.

Kalman Rozsahegyi died on 27 August 1961 in Budapest having become permanent member of the National Theatre, the founder of the School of Acting and an outstanding artist.

== Major acting roles ==
- Nick Bottom in A Midsummer Night's Dream
- the gravedigger in Hamlet
- the fool in King Lear, Twelfth Night
- Gobbo, old and young, in The Merchant of Venice
- Scapin in Molière's The Schemings of Scapin
- Master Jacob in Molière's The Miser
- eponymous character in Halévy's L'Abbé Constantin
- eponymous character in Poole's Paul Pry
- the Notarius of Peleske in József Gaál
- Matyi Baracs and Göre Gábor in Gárdonyi's The Wine
- Luka in Gorky's The Lower Depths
- Gáspár Boly in Harsányi's The Old Villain
- Uncle Berci in Zsigmond Móricz's Relatives
- Rageneau in Rostand's Cyrano de Bergerac

== Selected filmography ==
- Kiss Me, Darling (1932)
- Stolen Wednesday (1933)
- Cornflower (1934)
- The New Landlord (1935)
- The Golden Man (1936)
- Son of the Pusta (1936)
- Be True Until Death (1936)
- Sensation (1936)
- Three Dragons (1936)
- A Girl Sets Out (1937)
- There Are Exceptions (1937)
- Tokay Rhapsody (1937)
- My Daughter Is Different (1937)
- Viki (1937)
- The Village Rogue (1938)
- Black Diamonds (1938)
- Flower of the Tisza (1939)
- Wild Rose (1939)
- Deadly Spring (1939)
- Rózsafabot (1940)
- Yes or No? (1940)
- Closed Court (1940)
- Gábor Göre Returns (1940)
- Dankó Pista (1940)
- The Relative of His Excellency (1941)
- The Gyurkovics Boys (1941)
- Europe Doesn't Answer (1941)
- The Schoolmistress (1945)
- Springtime in Budapest (1955)
- What a Night! (1958)
