= Car of Dreams =

1935 film by Austin Melford, Graham Cutts

- Directed by: Graham Cutts; Austin Melford
- Written by: Adaptation; Stafford Dickins and Richard Benson screenplay Austin Melford
- Based on: The Dream Car (1934 film) by László Vadnay and Miklós Vitéz
- Produced by: Michael Balcon
- Starring: See below
- Cinematography: Mutz Greenbaum
- Edited by: Charles Frend
- Music by: Mischa Spoliansky; Bretton Byrd
- Production company: Gaumont British
- Distributed by: Gaumont British
- Release date: September 1935
- Running time: 72 minutes
- Country: United Kingdom
- Language: English

Car of Dreams is a 1935 British romantic comedy film directed by Graham Cutts and Austin Melford, starring Grete Mosheim, John Mills, Norah Howard and Robertson Hare. A tycoon's son falls in love with a woman who works at his father's factory. It was based on the 1934 Hungarian film The Dream Car. It was the first Hungarian film to be shot in English.

== Plot ==
Vera Hart lives with her parents. Her father is an antiques salesman who loves his stock too much to sell it and therefore does not make any money. Through her friend Molly, Vera manages to get a menial job at Miller's music instrument factory.

Vera has a habit of going into shops and trying on expensive clothes and jewellery which she could never hope to pay for. On her way home from work she stops in a car dealer and sits in a new luxury car. Robert Miller, the young son of the owner of Miller's factory, sees Vera and falls instantly in love with her. He pretends to be an employee at the car showroom and they bond together. On a whim, he decides to buy Vera the car and pretends she has won it as the 10,000th customer to visit the shop. Vera's father is delighted by the new car, but her mother is more suspicious.

Miller wants to spend more time with Vera, but he is uncertain about telling her his true identity in part because he is constantly harassed by women who are interested in his inheritance. He approaches the Hart family and offers to work as a chauffeur, doing jobs such as weddings to pay for it. As none of them can drive, they accept his offer. Miller gets into the habit of driving Vera to work at the factory, still not revealing the truth that his family owns the business.

When he discovers how little she is paid, he has her salary raised to five pounds a week. Unfortunately this leads to bad feelings amongst Vera's colleagues, in particular her superior Henry Butterworth and Anne Fisher, who has a crush on Miller, who suspect that Vera is the fancy woman of Miller. Vera is bemused by her pay rise because she is under the impression that she has never met Miller.

When Vera comes to his office to confront Miller about her increased salary, he hides and gets his friend Peters to pretend to be him. Peters takes a shine to Vera, and tries to persuade her to go out on a date with him. Once she has gone, Miller and Peters get into an argument over whether each of them have a shot with her and whether she is more interested in love or money. The debate is put to the test when Vera, Miller and Peters all head down to a country hotel for an ice-skating carnival. A concerned Mr Butterworth and Miss Fisher also go to the hotel to keep an eye on Vera, and are shocked when they see her separately with both Peters and Miller, believing that she is two-timing them.

Miller asks Vera to live with him for ever in a couple of rooms over a garage. She joyfully accepts, but when Butterworth tells her who Miller really is she is hurt - thinking that his offer was not one of marriage but one of a kept woman. She then pretends to be uninterested in Miller and instead focuses her attention on Peters. Eventually however the confusion is resolved and Miller and Vera drive off together in their "car of dreams".

== Cast ==
- Grete Mosheim as Vera Hart
- John Mills as Robert Miller
- Norah Howard as Anne Fisher
- Robertson Hare as Henry Butterworth
- Mark Lester as Miller Senr.
- Margaret Withers as Mrs. Hart
- Paul Graetz as Mr. Hart
- Glennis Lorimer as Molly
- Jack Hobbs as Peters
- Hay Plumb as Chauffeur

== Production ==
John Mills was under a two year contract to Gaumont British, where he said he "made a series of small-budget films, most of them instantly forgettable", including Car of Dreams. He called German star Greta Mosheim "a splendid actress wilh an excellent reputation and an advanced case of halitosis."

The film was shot at the Lime Grove Studios in London, with sets designed by the art director Alfred Junge.

== Reception ==
Variety called it "Gossamer entertainment of the pleasant, sentimental Cinderella variety."

The Hungarian version reached the USA before the British one.

== Soundtrack ==
- "Car of Dreams", written by Maurice Sigler, Al Goodhart and Al Hoffman
