= Antal Páger (actor) =

Hungarian actor

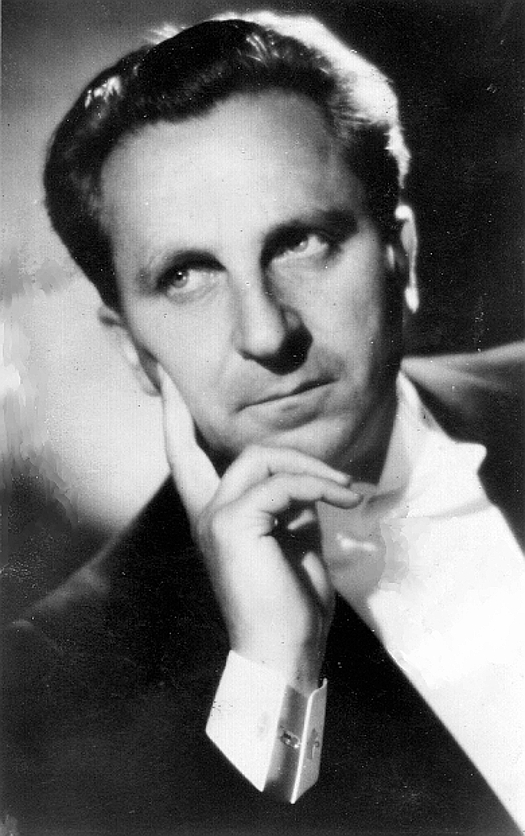
- Born: 29 January 1899; Makó, Austria-Hungary (now Hungary)
- Died: 14 December 1986 (aged 87); Budapest, Hungary
- Occupation: Actor
- Years active: 1932–1986

Antal Páger (29 January 1899 – 14 December 1986) was a Hungarian film actor. He appeared in 155 films between 1932 and 1986. He won the award for Best Actor at the 1964 Cannes Film Festival for his role in Drama of the Lark. He was married to the actress Júlia Komár from 1933 to 1961. He emigrated from Hungary in 1945 and returned in summer of 1956.

== Selected filmography ==
- Kiss Me, Darling (1932)
- Judgment of Lake Balaton (1933)
- Emmy (1934)
- Cornflower (1934)
- The Wise Mother (1935)
- Thanks for Knocking Me Down (1935)
- Kind Stepmother (1935)
- Anniversary (1936)
- Salary, 200 a Month (1936)
- Tales of Budapest (1937)
- A Girl Sets Out (1937)
- Hotel Springtime (1937)
- All Men Are Crazy (1937)
- Sweet Revenge (1937)
- I Defended a Woman (1938)
- Rézi Friday (1938)
- Rosemary (1938)
- Magda Expelled (1938)
- Man Sometimes Errs (1938)
- Billeting (1938)
- Istvan Bors (1939)
- Hello, Peter! (1939)
- The Minister's Friend (1939)
- Stars of Variety (1939)
- Landslide (1940)
- Haunting Spirit (1940)
- Closed Court (1940)
- Castle in Transylvania (1940)
- Yes or No? (1940)
- One Night in Transylvania (1941)
- Háry János (1941)
- Property for Sale (1941)
- Finally! (1941)
- András (1941)
- Sister Beáta (1941)
- Old Waltz (1941)
- Male Fidelity (1942)
- Lóránd Fráter (1942)
- Beautiful Star (1942)
- Dr. Kovács István (1942)
- Changing the Guard (1942)
- Together (1943)
- Dani (1957)
- Danse Macabre (1958)
- Pillar of Salt (1958)
- Don Juan's Last Adventure (1958)
- Yesterday (1959)
- For Whom the Larks Sing (1959)
- Crime at Dawn (1960)
- Young Noszty and Mary Toth (1960)
- I'll Go to the Minister (1962)
- Drama of the Lark (1963)
- Twenty Hours (1965)
- The Toth Family (1969)
