= The Dream Car =

- Directed by: Béla Gaál
- Written by: László Vadnay; Miklós Vitéz
- Produced by: Mrs. Miklós Vitéz
- Starring: Zita Perczel; Ella Gombaszögi; Klári Tolnay; Jenő Törzs
- Cinematography: Heinrich Balasch
- Music by: Alfréd Márkus
- Production company: Reflektor Film
- Release date: 14 December 1934
- Running time: 99 minutes
- Country: Hungary
- Language: Hungarian

The Dream Car (Hungarian: Meseautó) is a 1934 Hungarian romantic comedy film directed by Béla Gaál and starring Zita Perczel, Jenő Törzs, Ella Gombaszögi and Klári Tolnay. A tycoon falls in love with a poor woman and secretly buys her a car. The 1935 British film Car of Dreams was based on this film.

== Cast ==
- Zita Perczel as Kovács Vera
- Ella Gombaszögi as Kerekes Anna, secretary of chairman
- Klári Tolnay as Sári, Vera's friend
- Jenő Törzs as Szűcs János, chairman of the bank
- Gyula Kabos as Halmos Aladár, Head of Department
- Lili Berky as Vera's mother
- Gyula Gózon as Vera's father
- Vilmos Komlós as butcher
- Jenő Herczeg as Péterffy, car dealership owner
- Sándor Pethes as Józsi, chauffeur
- Lajos Sugár as waiter at hotel
- Gusztáv Vándory as waiter
- Zoltán Várkonyi as car salesman
- Tibor Weygand as singing boy
- Ede Hilbert as Child
- Lenke Szőnyi as ex mistress

== Bibliography ==
- Burns, Bryan. World Cinema: Hungary. Fairleigh Dickinson Univ Press, 1996.
- Reid, John Howard. Science-fiction & Fantasy Cinema: Classic Films of Horror, Sci-fi & The Supernatural. 2007.
