= Marcsa Simon =

Hungarian actress (1882–1954)

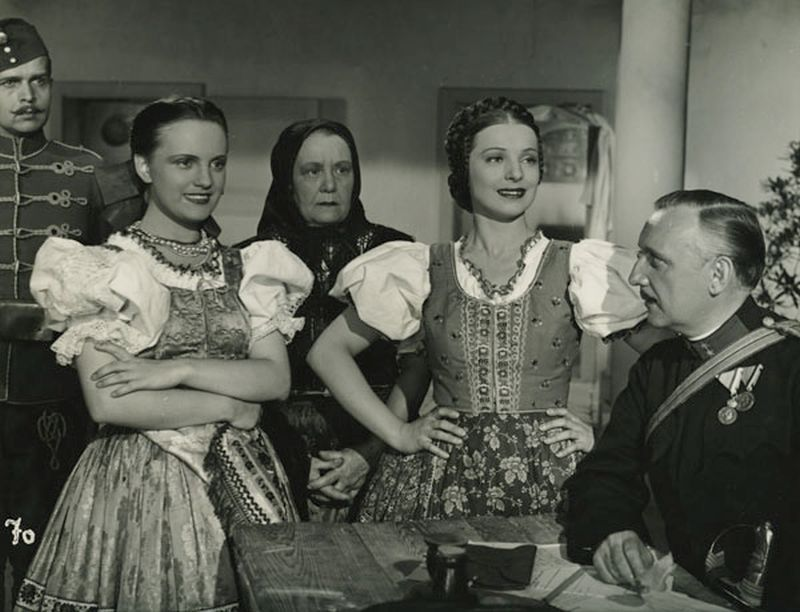
- Scene from the Hungarian movie Piros bugyelláris (The Red Wallet) (released in 1938), Zsóka Ölvedy, Marcsa Simon, Bella Bordy
- Born: Mária Cecília Simon; 18 May 1882; Tápiószele, Austria-Hungary
- Died: 8 January 1954 (aged 71); Budapest, Hungary
- Occupation: Actress

Marcsa Simon (born Mária Cecília Simon 21 November 1882 – 8 January 1954) was a Hungarian actress.

She was born in Tápiószele and died in Budapest.

== Selected filmography ==
- Miska the Magnate (1916)
- St. Peter's Umbrella (1917)
- Oliver Twist (1919)
- Melody of the Heart (1929)
- Hyppolit, the Butler (1931)
- Kiss Me, Darling (1932)
- Anniversary (1936)
- Son of the Pusta (1936)
- Cobweb (1936)
- Be True Until Death (1936)
- 120 Kilometres an Hour (1937)
- There Are Exceptions (1937)
- The Lady Is a Bit Cracked (1938)
- Barbara in America (1938)
- The Red Wallet (1938)
- Two Prisoners (1938)
- The Lady Is a Bit Cracked (1938)
- The Village Rogue (1938)
- Bors István (1939)
- Princess of the Puszta (1939)
- Between River and Steppe (1939)
- Flower of the Tisza (1939)
- Wild Rose (1939)
- Rózsafabot (1940)
- Everybody Loves Someone Else (1940)
- On the Way Home (1940)
- Gábor Göre Returns (1940)
- The Unquiet Night (1940)
- Castle in Transylvania (1940)
- Sarajevo (1940)
- Landslide (1940)
- Three Bells (1941)
- A Bowl of Lentils (1941)
- Let's Love Each Other (1941)
- Silenced Bells (1941)
- Dr. Kovács István (1942)
- Deadly Kiss (1942)
- Katyi (1942)
- Temptation (1942)
- Siamese Cat (1943)
- Loving Hearts (1944)
- Wedding March (1944)
- Song of the Cornfields (1947)
- A Woman Gets a Start (1949)
- Full Steam Ahead (1951)

== Bibliography ==
- Kulik, Karol. Alexander Korda: The Man Who Could Work Miracles. Virgin Books, 1990.
