= Gyula Szőreghy =

Hungarian actor

Gyula Szőreghy (30 November 1887 – 22 December 1942) was a Hungarian film actor.

Szőreghy was born in Algyo, Austria-Hungary (now, Hungary) and died in 1942 in Budapest. He was also credited as Julius von Szöreghy.

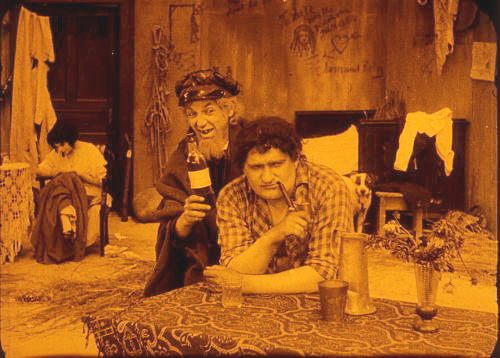
Gyula Szőreghy, was a Hungarian film actor.

== Selected filmography ==
- Mary Ann (1918)
- White Rose (1919)
- Oliver Twist (1919)
- Serge Panine (1922)
- Sodom and Gomorrah (1922)
- Masters of the Sea (1922)
- A Vanished World (1922)
- Gypsy Love (1922)
- Young Medardus (1923)
- Gulliver's Travels (1924)
- The Alternative Bride (1925)
- Ship in Distress (1925)
- Women You Rarely Greet (1925)
- Cock of the Roost (1925)
- The Wooing of Eve (1926)
- Darling, Count the Cash (1926)
- The Third Squadron (1926)
- Maytime (1926)
- Unmarried Daughters (1926)
- German Hearts on the German Rhine (1926)
- Two and a Lady (1926)
- Her Highness Dances the Waltz (1926)
- Dancing Vienna (1927)
- The Most Beautiful Legs of Berlin (1927)
- Break-in (1927)
- The Woman from the Folies Bergères (1927)
- A Serious Case (1927)
- The Woman in the Cupboard (1927)
- A Modern Dubarry (1927)
- Orient Express (1927)
- Fabulous Lola (1927)
- The Prince of Pappenheim (1927)
- One Plus One Equals Three (1927)
- The Queen of the Variety (1927)
- The Gallant Hussar (1928)
- The Page Boy at the Golden Lion (1928)
- Two Red Roses (1928)
- The Case of Prosecutor M (1928)
- The House Without Men (1928)
- Suzy Saxophone (1928)
- Only a Viennese Woman Kisses Like That (1928)
- The Lady in Black (1928)
- The Lady with the Mask (1928)
- Princess Olala (1928)
- Artists (1928)
- Looping the Loop (1928)
- Mikosch Comes In (1928)
- The Gypsy Chief (1929)
- The Third Confession (1929)
- The Cabinet of Doctor Larifari (1930)
- The Uncle from Sumatra (1930)
- General Babka (1930)
- My Leopold (1931)
- Grock (1931)
- Victoria and Her Hussar (1931)
- Night Convoy (1932)
- The Man Under the Bridge (1936)
- Cafe Moscow (1936)
- Sensation (1936)
- Viki (1937)
- Azurexpress (1938)
- Barbara in America (1938)
- Black Diamonds (1938)
- Hello, Peter! (1939)
- Hungary's Revival (1939)
- Two Girls on the Street (1939)
- The Ball Is On (1939)
- Everybody Loves Someone Else (1940)
- Haunting Spirit (1940)
- The Chequered Coat (1940)
- Gábor Göre Returns (1940)
- Háry János (1941)
- Old Waltz (1941)
- Three Bells (1941)
- The Marriage Market (1941)
- Don't Ask Who I Was (1941)
- The Devil Doesn't Sleep (1941)
- Let's Love Each Other (1941)
- Silenced Bells (1941)
- Europe Doesn't Answer (1941)
- Yellow Rose (1941)
- Taken by the Flood (1941)
- Kádár Versus Kerekes (1942)
- Sabotage (1942)
- Lóránd Fráter (1942)
- Disillusion (1943)
- Dream Waltz (1943)

== Bibliography ==
- Kulik, Karol. Alexander Korda: The Man Who Could Work Miracles. Virgin Books, 1990.
