= The Village Rogue (1938 film) =

1938 film

- Directed by: Béla Pásztor
- Written by: György Kürthy; Lajos Pásztor
- Based on: The Village Rogue by Ede Tóth
- Produced by: György Engel
- Starring: Margit Dajka; Artúr Somlay; Zsóka Ölvedy
- Cinematography: Ferenc Gergelits; Andor Vidor
- Edited by: Zoltán Farkas
- Music by: László Angyal
- Production company: Unitas
- Release date: 12 January 1938
- Running time: 96 minutes
- Country: Hungary
- Language: Hungarian

The Village Rogue (Hungarian: A falu rossza) is a 1938 Hungarian drama film directed by Béla Pásztor and starring Margit Dajka, Artúr Somlay and Zsóka Ölvedy. It was based on an 1875 play by Ede Tóth, previously made into a 1916 silent film of the same title.

== Cast ==
- Margit Dajka as Finum Rózsi
- Artúr Somlay as Feledi, bíró
- Zsóka Ölvedy as Feledi Piroska
- Zoltán Greguss as Göndör Sándor
- Erzsi Somogyi as Bátki Tercsi
- Kálmán Rózsahegyi as Gonosz Pista
- Ferenc Hoykó as Lajcsi, Feledi bíró fia
- János Balassa as Cigányprímás
- József Berky as Cigány
- József Bihari as Jóska, Feledi bérese
- Irma Cserei as Felediék szakácsnöje
- Lajos Gárday as Csendbiztos
- Lajos Gárdonyi as Kocsmáros
- György Hajnal as Cigány
- Zoltán Hosszú as Koma
- Margit Ladomerszky as Julis, a koma felesége
- Antal Matány as Cigány
- Ilona Náday as Mariska - Feledi Boriska barátnöje
- Erzsi Pártos as Kocsmárosné
- Domokos Sala as Cigányzenész
- Marcsa Simon as Gonosz Pista felesége
- Böske T. Oláh as Vendég a kézfogón
- Böske Tóth as Vendég a kézfogón

== Bibliography ==
- Cunningham, John. Hungarian Cinema: From Coffee House to Multiplex. Wallflower Press, 2004.
- Juhász, István. Kincses magyar filmtár 1931-1944: az eredeti forgatókönyvből 1931 és 1944 között létrejött hazai mozgóképekről. Kráter, 2007.
- Rîpeanu, Bujor. (ed.) International Directory of Cinematographers, Set- and Costume Designers in Film: Hungary (from the beginnings to 1988). Saur, 1981.
