= The Red Wallet =

1938 film

- Directed by: Béla Pásztor
- Written by: Ferenc Csepreghy; Géza Palásthy; Kálmán Zsabka
- Produced by: Ernő Teichmann
- Starring: Bella Bordy; Artúr Somlay; Ferenc Kiss
- Cinematography: Ferenc Gergelits
- Music by: László Angyal
- Production company: Standard Film
- Release date: 21 August 1938
- Running time: 98 minutes
- Country: Hungary
- Language: Hungarian

The Red Wallet (Hungarian: Piros bugyelláris) is a 1938 Hungarian drama film directed by Béla Pásztor and starring Bella Bordy, Artúr Somlay and Ferenc Kiss. It was shot at the Hunnia Studios in Budapest. The film's sets were designed by the art director Imre Sőrés.

== Cast ==
- Bella Bordy as Török Zsófi
- Artúr Somlay as Török Mihály, bíró
- Ferenc Kiss as Csillag Pali
- Sándor Pethes as Pennás, jegyzõ
- Gyula Tapolczay as Hájas, ispán
- Attila Petheö as Kapitány
- György Gonda as Peták, káplán
- Lajos Kelemen as Írnok
- Zsóka Ölvedy as Mencike
- Margit Ladomerszky as Cigányasszony
- Ferenc Hoykó as Kósza Gyula
- Marcsa Simon as Jolán néni
- Zoltán Pethö as Falusi táncoló legény
- Ferenc Pethes as Kikiáltó
- Erzsi Benedek as Panni, cselédlány
- Ilona Náday as Falusi lány
- Imre Varga as Huszár
- Lajos Ujváry as Marci bácsi, kocsis
- Zoltán Losonczy as Huszár
- György Litassy as Huszár
- Kálmán Vessely as Huszár
- Ferenc Szabó as Huszár

== Bibliography ==
- Juhász, István. Kincses magyar filmtár 1931-1944: az eredeti forgatókönyvből 1931 és 1944 között létrejött hazai mozgóképekről. Kráter, 2007.
- Nemeskürty, István. A képpé varázsolt idő: a magyar film története és helye az egyetemes kultúrában, párhuzamos kitekintéssel a világ filmművészetére. Magvető, 1983.
- Rîpeanu, Bujor. (ed.) International Directory of Cinematographers, Set- and Costume Designers in Film: Hungary (from the beginnings to 1988). Saur, 1981.
