= Zsóka Ölvedy =

Hungarian actress (1912–1981)

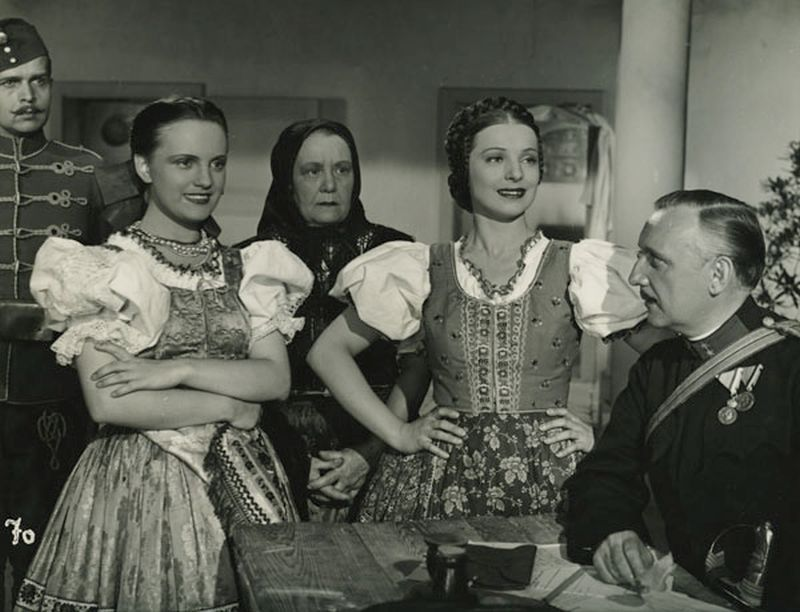
- Ölvedy (left) with Marcsa Simon and Bella Bordy in The Red Wallet (1938)
- Born: 12 April 1912; Budapest, Austro-Hungarian Empire
- Died: 14 December 1981 (aged 69); Balatonfüred, Hungary
- Occupation: Actress
- Years active: 1935–1943 (film)

Zsóka Ölvedy (12 April 1912 – 14 December 1981) was a Hungarian stage and film actress. She generally played supporting roles in films of the Horthy era.

== Selected filmography ==
- The Wise Mother (1935)
- The Red Wallet (1938)
- Barbara in America (1938)
- Bence Uz (1938)
- The Village Rogue (1938)
- Flower of the Tisza (1939)
- Wedding in Toprin (1939)
- Wildflowers of Gyimes (1939)
- Makacs Kata 1943)
- Ágrólszakadt úrilány (1943)
- Half a Boy (1944)

== Bibliography ==
- Enyedi, Sándor. Rivalda nélkül: a határon túli magyar színjátszás kislexikona. Teleki László Alapítvány, 1999.
- Klaus, Ulrich J. Deutsche Tonfilme: Jahrgang 1939. Klaus-Archiv, 1988.
