= Ferenc Szécsi =

Hungarian actor

- Born: 11 July 1913; Herkulesfürdõ, Austria-Hungary
- Died: 1 March 1974 (aged 60); Budapest, Hungary
- Occupation: Film actor
- Years active: 1917–1965

Ferenc Szécsi (11 July 1913 – 1 March 1974) was a Hungarian stage and film actor with one directing credit at the end of a long career. In 1916, at the age of three and credited as Szécsi Ferkó, he appeared in the film Elnémult harangok.

== Selected filmography ==
- Jön az öcsém (1919)
- Lengyelvér (1920)
- The Frozen Child (1921)
- Elnémult harangok (1922)
- Stars of Eger (1923)
- Christopher Columbus (1923)
- Tokay Rhapsody (1937)
- Az örök titok (1938)
- Flower of the Tisza (1939)
- The Bercsenyi Hussars (1940)
- Everybody Loves Someone Else (1940)
- The Gyurkovics Boys (1941)
- András (1941)
- Time of Trial (1942)
- Green Years (1965)

== Bibliography ==
- Cunningham, John. Hungarian Cinema: From Coffee House to Multiplex. Wallflower Press, 2004.
