= Vali Rácz =

Hungarian actress, singer

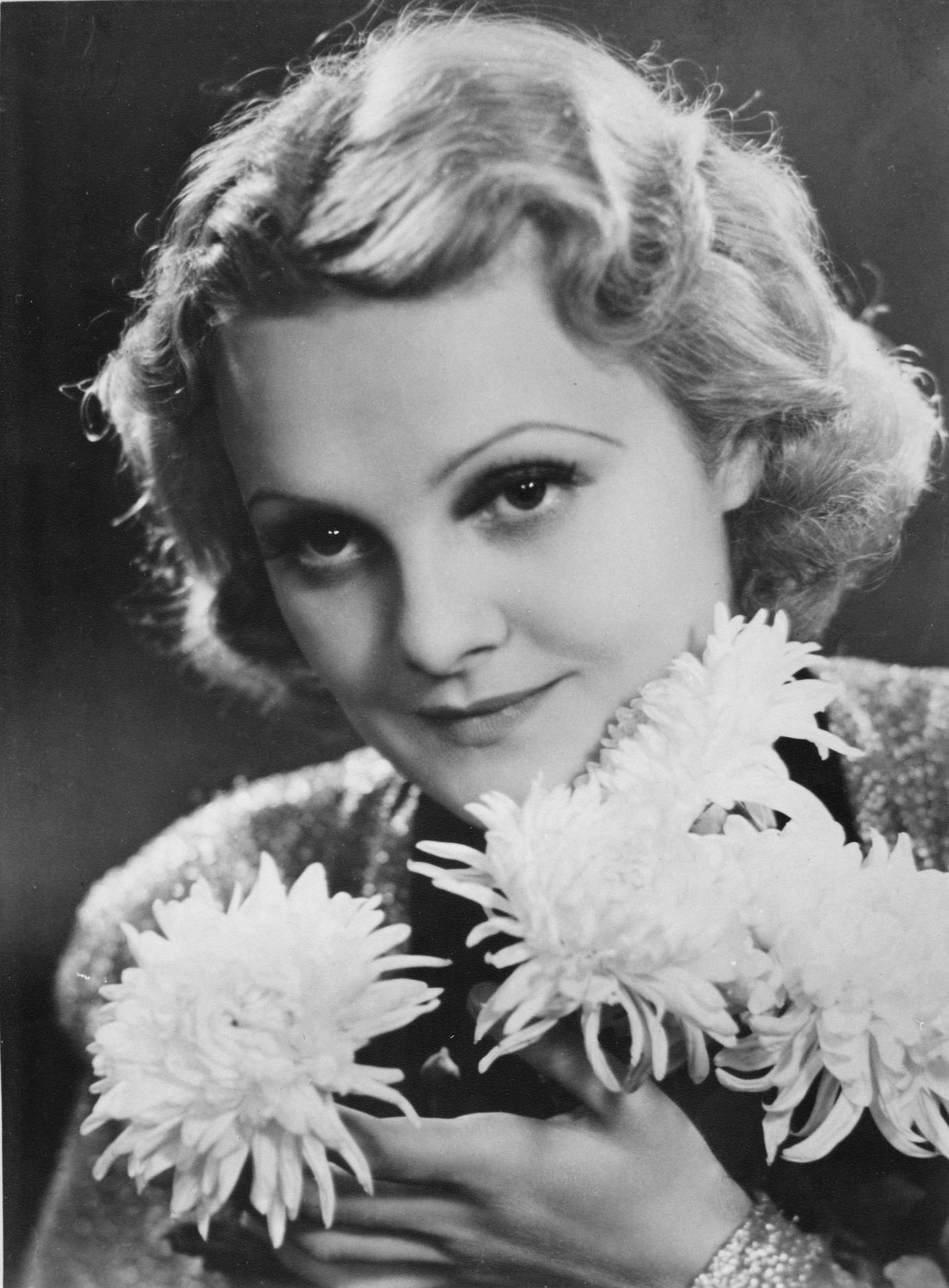
- Rácz Vali during the 1930s
- Born: Rácz Valéria; 25 December 1911; Gölle, Hungary
- Died: 12 February 1997 (aged 85); Munich, Germany
- Occupations: Actress; singer
- Spouse(s): Péter Halász (író, újságíró)

Vali Rácz (born Valéria Rácz; 25 December 1911 – 12 February 1997) was a successful Hungarian singer and film actress, the darling of the Hungarian public. She finished the Franz Liszt Music Academy in Budapest 1932. Between 1933 and 1934, she played at City Theatre and then at Hungarian Theatre. In 1936, she sang at 'Terézkörúti Színpad' and at City Theatre for three years. After 1945 she was a member of Royal Revue-theatre, Medgyaszay Theatre, then Kamara Varieté. She acted in twenty films, but was primarily a chanteuse, giving solo concerts at the Music Academy and Vigadó concert hall, as well as appearing regularly at the Hangli Kioszk nightclub. She left Hungary with her husband Peter Halász and children, Mónika and Valér, in the wake of the Hungarian Revolution of 1956. She lived in New York City, later in London, and in 1975 settled in Munich, Germany. On 25 May 1992, she was honoured as a Righteous Gentile by Yad Vashem in Jerusalem, for having saved Jewish lives during the Holocaust. She died at the age of 85 in 1997.

== Biography ==
Vali Rácz was a popular Hungarian singer and actress whose heyday was the late 1930s and the 1940s. As well as being a regular nightclub performer, she was a recording artist and appeared in approximately 20 Hungarian feature films. Her glamorous looks and sex appeal led to her reputation as the ‘Hungarian Marlene Dietrich’.

Vali Rácz was born on 25 December 1911, in the village of Gölle in southwestern Hungary, to devout Catholic parents. Her father was Headmaster of the village school. After her education at a convent school she moved to Budapest to study at the Franz Liszt Music Academy. Soon after graduating, thanks to her fine mezzo-soprano voice, she began to get small singing roles in films and before long the popular songwriters of the day were composing hits for her.

During the Second World War she was the pin-up of Hungarian troops fighting on the Eastern Front. In April 1944, when the Nazis occupied Hungary and began to deport the country’s Jewish population, Rácz became involved in sheltering Jewish friends at her villa in Budapest. Between April and November of that year five Jews lived there clandestinely, until Rácz was inadvertently betrayed by the husband of one of the resident fugitives. Rácz was arrested by the Hungarian secret police and incarcerated at their headquarters, the notorious Hotel Majestic, where prisoners were interrogated and often tortured before being deported or killed.

Through the efforts of her supporters in the underground, she was ultimately released. The Jews whom she had helped managed to evade capture and all survived the war, some later emigrating to Israel. In 1991, almost half a century after those events, she was honoured as a Righteous Among the Nations by the Holocaust Martyrs’ and Heroes’ Remembrance Authority at Yad Vashem, in Jerusalem.

In 1946, Vali Rácz married the writer and journalist Péter Halász. Their son Valér was born in the Fifties, followed two years later by their daughter Mónika (who later became the London-based journalist Monica Porter). The family escaped from Hungary in the wake of the 1956 Uprising and emigrated to America. In 1970 they moved back to Europe and in 1975 Vali Rácz and her husband made their home in Munich, Germany, where he worked as a writer and broadcaster for Radio Free Europe. Vali Rácz died there on 12 February 1997.

Monica Porter’s book about her mother’s wartime exploits, Deadly Carousel: A Singer’s Story of the Second World War, first published in 1990, brought the life and career of Vali Rácz to the attention of a wider audience, outside Hungary.

The Other Schindlers: Why Some People Chose to Save Jews in the Holocaust. Book by Agnes Grunwald-Spier, with a foreword by Sir Martin Gilbert. Published by The History Press, 2010. Pages 45-49 are about Vali Racz's story.

== Films, roles ==
Released	Title	English title	Role in the film
1936	Pókháló	Cobweb	Singer
1938	Leányvári boszorkány	The Witch of Leányvár	The beautiful Meluzina
1939	5 óra 40	The Five-Forty	Singer
1939	Két lány az utcán	Two Girls on the Street	Manci
1939	Karosszék	The Armchair	Radio-singer
1939	Toprini nász	Wedding in Toprin	Lola
1940	Hazafelé	On the Way Home	
1941	Szeressük egymást	Let's Love Each Other	
1941	Cigarettafüst	Cigarette Smoke	Singer
1941	Három csengő	Three Bells	Singer
1941	Magdolna	Magdolna	Jolanta
1941	Bűnös vagyok!	I Am Guilty	Sári, friend of Lola
1942	Az éjszaka lánya	The Night Girl	Emmi
1942	Éjfélre kiderül	We'll Know By Midnight	Molly, the president's girl
1942	Bajtársak	Comrades	Singer
1942	Gyávaság	Cowardice	
1942	Annamária	Annamarie	
1943	Majális	May 1 Picnic	Ferike, prima donna
1943	Fehér vonat	The White Train	
1946	Stabil a csók!	The Kiss Is Stable	
1955	Az élet hídja	The Bridge of Life	

== See also ==
- Hungarian pop
