= László Cserépy =

Hungarian screenwriter and film director

- Born: 29 December 1907; Budapest; Hungary
- Died: 1 August 1956 (aged 48); Toronto, Ontario; Canada
- Occupations: Film director, screenwriter
- Years active: 1940 - 1944)

László Cserépy (1907–1956) was a Hungarian screenwriter and film director.

== Selected filmography ==
- Cserebere (1940)
- On the Way Home (1940)
- Landslide (1940)
- Lelki klinika (1941)
- Let's Love Each Other (1941)
- Estélyiruha kötelezö (1942)
- We'll Know By Midnight (1942)
- Orient Express (1943)
- Together (1943)
