= József Babay =

Hungarian screenwriter

- Born: 28 November 1898; Nagyatád, Austro-Hungarian Empire
- Died: 19 July 1956 (aged 57); Budapest, Hungary
- Occupations: Screenwriter, novelist
- Years active: 1938–1956 (film)

József Babay (1898–1956) was a Hungarian journalist, novelist, playwright and screenwriter. He was active in the Hungarian film industry particularly during the late 1930s and the Second World War. He supplies the librettos for operettas by Dénes von Buday.

== Selected filmography ==
- The Five-Forty (1939)
- Hungary's Revival (1939)
- The Ball Is On (1939)
- Fehérvári huszárok (1939)
- Semmelweis (1940)
- Rózsafabot (1940)
- Flames (1941)
- The Marriage Market (1941)
- A Heart Stops Beating (1942)
- The Dance of Death (1942)
- Two Blue Eyes (1955)
- Leila and Gábor (1956)

== Bibliography ==
- Juhász, István. Kincses magyar filmtár 1931–1944: az eredeti forgatókönyvből 1931 és 1944 között létrejött hazai mozgóképekről. Kráter, 2007.
- Vilmos, Várkonyi. Jávor Pál: és a magyar film aranykora. Zima Szabolcs, 2013
