= Margit Dajka =

Hungarian actress (1907–1986)

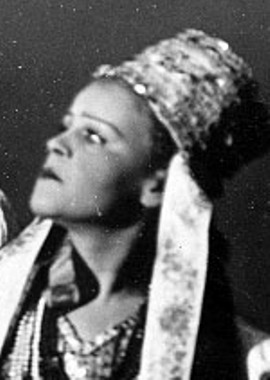
- Dajka in 1931
- Born: 13 October 1907; Nagyvárad, Austria-Hungary (now Oradea, Romania)
- Died: 24 May 1986 (aged 78); Budapest, Hungary
- Resting place: Farkasréti Cemetery
- Occupation: Actress
- Years active: 1932–1986

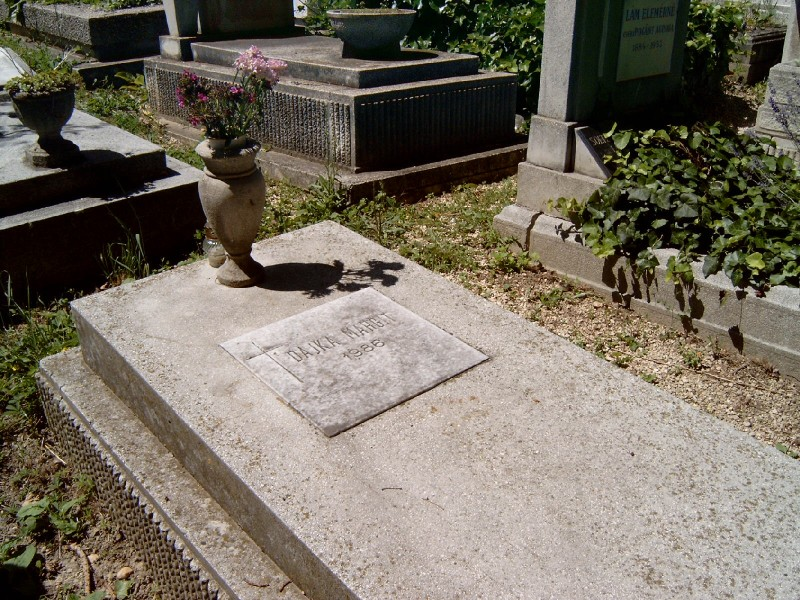
Margit Dajka tomb of the cemetery Farkasréti

Margit Dajka (13 October 1907 – 24 May 1986) was a Hungarian actress. She appeared in more than 60 films between 1932 and 1986. She starred in the 1976 film A Strange Role. It was entered into the 27th Berlin International Film Festival, where it won the Silver Bear. Her fourth and last husband was military officer Árpád Lajtos. She was awarded the Kossuth Prize in 1952.

== Selected filmography ==
- Piri mindent tud (1932) - Piri, Bognár felesége
- The Rakoczi March (1933) - Vilma, Jób lánya
- Modern Girls (1937) - Kati, cselédlány
- Torockói menyasszony (1937) - Patkós Nagy Rózsi
- The Village Rogue (1938) - Finum Rózsi
- Man Sometimes Errs (1938) - Zizus, utcalány
- A harapós férj (1938) - Lina, Péter elvált felesége
- The Wrong Man (1938) - Anna, Benedek Péter felesége
- Barbara in America (1938) - Borcsa
- Janos the Valiant (1939) - Iluska
- Wild Rose (1939) - Éva
- Money Talks (1940) - Julcsa
- Sárga rózsa (1941)
- Háry János (1941) - Örzse
- Szakítani nehéz dolog (1942) - Hammer Milka
- Szerelmi láz (1943) - Éva
- Zenélö malom (1943) - Bogár Cica - pesti dizõz
- Liliomfi (1955) - Camilla
- Szakadék (1956) - Bakos néni
- Danse Macabre (1958) - Nagymama
- Iron Flower (1958) - Racsákné
- For Whom the Larks Sing (1959) - Sándor édesanyja
- Égrenyíló ablak (1960) - Fazekasné
- Zápor (1961) - Juli néni
- Amíg holnap lesz (1962) - Zágon felesége
- Az orvos halála (1966) - Csohányné
- Szentjános fejevétele (1966) - Rhédeyné
- A férfi egészen más (1966) - Marika Anyja
- ...Hogy szaladnak a fák! (1967) - Vass Mari
- Változó felhözet (1967) - Házmesterné
- A völgy (1968) - Anna néni
- Elsietett házasság (1968) - Háziasszony
- Pokolrév (1969) - Mérges Franciska
- Forbidden Ground (1969) - özv. Széki Józsefné
- Az oroszlán ugrani készül (1969) - Aranka
- Ismeri a szandi mandit? (1969) - Piroska anyja
- N.N. a halál angyala (1970) - Nusi anyja
- Szindbád (1971) - Majmunka
- Cats' Play (1972) - Anna néni
- 141 Minutes from the Unfinished Sentence (1975) - Hupka
- Az öreg (1975) - Treszka anyja
- Ballagó idö (1976) - Dédmama
- A Strange Role (1976) - Öreg primadonna
- Herkulesfürdöi emlék (1976) - Öreg primadonna
- Legato (1978) - Zarkóczy Amálka
- A Nice Neighbor (1979) - Iduka
- Égigérö fü (1979) - Oszkár mamája
- Csontváry (1980) - Mom
- Völegény (1982) - Gyengusné
