= Let's Love Each Other =

1941 film

- Directed by: Arzén von Cserépy
- Written by: Pál Barabás
- Produced by: Nándor Jenes
- Starring: Elma Bulla; Gyula Csortos; Mici Erdélyi
- Cinematography: Barnabás Hegyi
- Edited by: László Cserépy
- Music by: Miklos Laurisin
- Production company: Cserépy Film
- Release date: 7 February 1941
- Running time: 85 minutes
- Country: Hungary
- Language: Hungarian

Let's Love Each Other (Hungarian: Szeressük egymást) is a 1941 Hungarian drama film directed by Arzén von Cserépy and starring Elma Bulla, Gyula Csortos and Mici Erdélyi. It was shot at the Hunnia Studios in Budapest. The film's sets were designed by the art director István Básthy.

== Synopsis ==
A factory owner discovers he is seriously ill, and summons his son Peter from a study trip abroad to help him run the business. Peter soon is called to make a ruling involving a dispute between a foreman and an attractive worker Vera. He initially decides against her, but soon begins to change his mind as he gets to know her better.

== Cast ==
- Elma Bulla as Benda Vera
- Gyula Csortos as Szitár Kálmán gyártulajdonos
- Zoltán Greguss as Szitár Péter / Galáti Péter
- Mici Erdélyi as Kálmán szeretõje
- Valéria Hidvéghy as Judit, titkárnõ
- Vali Rácz as Vera barátnõje
- Marcsa Simon as Vera anyja
- Lajos Köpeczi Boócz as sánta Broda
- Jenö Danis as Vera édesapja, portás
- Zoltán Makláry as Veráék szomszédja
- Tivadar Bilicsi as Müvezetõ
- Elemér Baló as Gyári munkás
- Lenke Egyed as A müvezetõ felesége
- Béla Fáy as Pásztori, Vera egyik barátnõjének férje
- György Gonda as Munkás
- Lajos Gárday as Munkás
- Károly Hajagos as Rendõr
- Lajos Kozma as Orvos
- József Medgyessy as Gyári munkás
- Sándor Solymossy as Gyári munkás
- Gyula Szöreghy as Költöztetõ
- Imre Toronyi as Orvos

== Bibliography ==
- Juhász, István. Kincses magyar filmtár 1931-1944: az eredeti forgatókönyvből 1931 és 1944 között létrejött hazai mozgóképekről. Kráter, 2007.
- Rîpeanu, Bujor. (ed.) International Directory of Cinematographers, Set- and Costume Designers in Film: Hungary (from the beginnings to 1988). Saur, 1981.
- Veress, József. A Magyar film története. Anno Kiadó, 2006
