= József Timár =

Hungarian actor

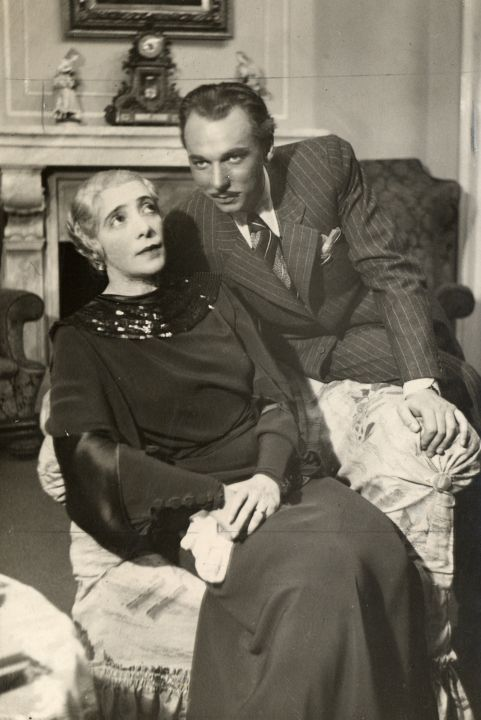
- Timár in a 1934 play.
- Born: 7 March 1902; Budapest, Austria-Hungary
- Died: 3 October 1960 (aged 58); Budapest, Hungary
- Occupation: Actor
- Years active: 1936–1960 (film)

József Timár (1902–1960) was a Hungarian stage and film actor. He was associated with the National Theatre in Budapest for many years.

== Selected filmography ==
- Cafe Moscow (1936)
- Sensation (1936)
- A Girl Sets Out (1937)
- Wildflowers of Gyimes (1939)
- Rózsafabot (1940)
- Closed Court (1940)
- Castle in Transylvania (1940)
- Sarajevo (1940)
- András (1941)
- We'll Know By Midnight (1942)
- Semmelweis (1952)
- Relatives (1954)
- Rakoczy's Lieutenant (1954)
- Ward 9 (1955)
- Accident (1955)
- Dollar Daddy (1956)
- Adventure in Gerolstein (1957)
- Two Confessions (1957)
- Red Ink (1960)

== Bibliography ==
- Kósa, László. A Cultural History of Hungary: In the Nineteenth and Twentieth Centuries. Corvina, 2000.
- Nemeskürty, István & Szántó, Tibor. A Pictorial Guide to the Hungarian Cinema, 1901-1984. Helikon, 1985.
