= Ilona Dajbukát =

Hungarian actress

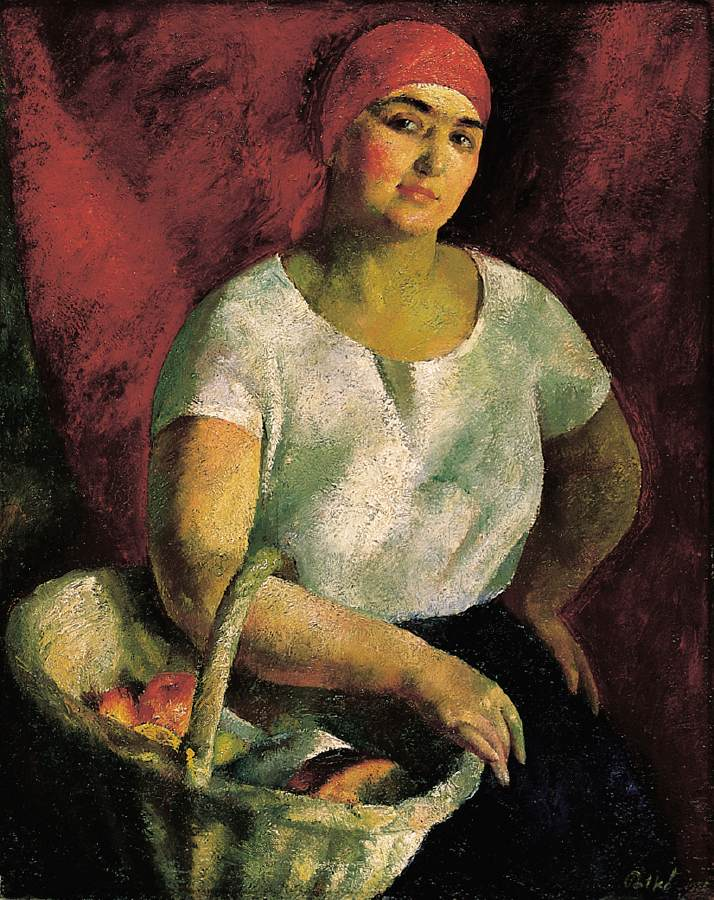
- A 1925 portrait of Dajbukát by Károly Patkó
- Born: 14 November 1892; Piskitelep, Austria-Hungary
- Died: 22 January 1976 (aged 83); Budapest, Hungary
- Occupation: Film actress
- Years active: 1930–1964

Ilona Dajbukát (14 November 1892 – 22 January 1976) was a Hungarian actress of Armenian ancestry.

== Selected filmography ==
- Kiss Me, Darling (1932)
- Spring Shower (1932)
- Address Unknown (1935)
- The Students of Igloi (1935)
- Kind Stepmother (1935)
- I Can't Live Without Music (1935)
- The Empress and the Hussar (1935)
- Tomi (1936)
- Tokay Rhapsody (1937)
- All Men Are Crazy (1937)
- The Witch of Leányvár (1938)
- Between River and Steppe (1939)
- Flower of the Tisza (1939)
- Princess of the Puszta (1939)
- Wild Rose (1939)
- Rózsafabot (1940)
- Gábor Göre Returns (1940)
- Property for Sale (1941)
- The Devil Doesn't Sleep (1941)
- Taken by the Flood (1941)
- We'll Know By Midnight (1942)
- Borrowed Husbands (1942)
- The Marsh Flower (1943)
- Suburban Guard Post (1943)
- Full Steam Ahead (1951)
- Try and Win (1952)
- A Glass of Beer (1955)
- Lady-Killer in Trouble (1964)

== Bibliography ==
- Burns, Bryan. World Cinema: Hungary. Fairleigh Dickinson University Press, 1996.
