= László Misoga =

Hungarian actor

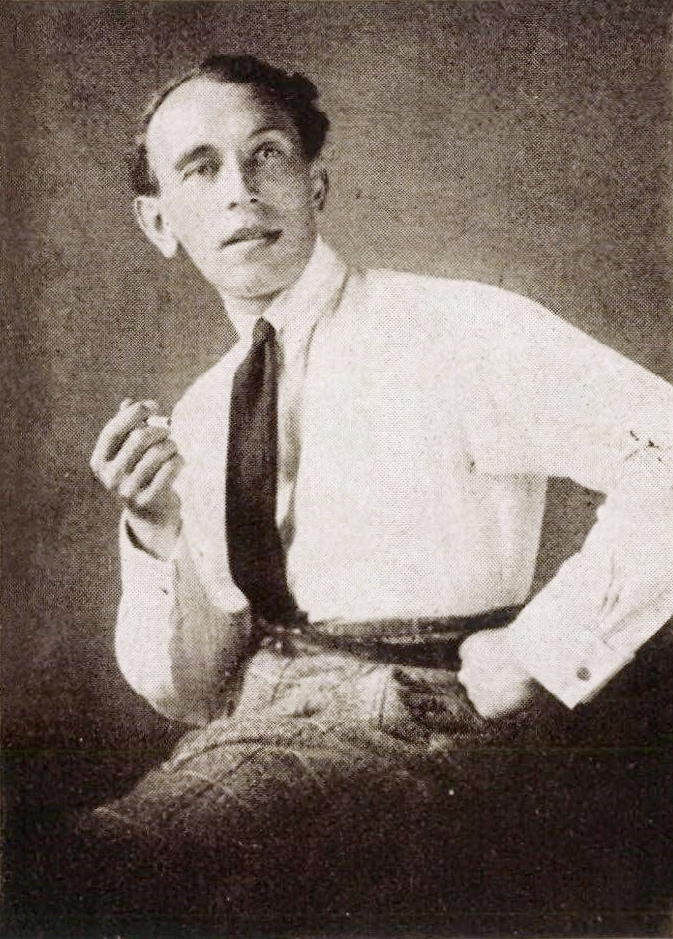
- Misoga in 1930.
- Born: 16 June 1895; Budapest, Austro-Hungarian Empire
- Died: 8 April 1969 (aged 73); Budapest, Hungary
- Occupation: Actor
- Years active: 1937–1969 (film & TV)

László Misoga (1895–1969) was a Hungarian film and stage actor. Later in his career he also appeared in television productions. Misoga was a prolific character actor who specialised in supporting roles.

== Selected filmography ==
- Bence Uz (1938)
- Black Diamonds (1938)
- The Wrong Man (1938)
- The Lady Is a Bit Cracked (1938)
- The Perfect Man (1939)
- Six Weeks of Happiness (1939)
- Princess of the Puszta (1939)
- Money Is Coming (1939)
- The Five-Forty (1939)
- Hungary's Revival (1939)
- Wildflowers of Gyimes (1939)
- Wild Rose (1939)
- Duel for Nothing (1940)
- Gábor Göre Returns (1940)
- Matthew Arranges Things (1940)
- The Last of the Vereczkeys (1940)
- The Bercsenyi Hussars (1940)
- You Are the Song (1940)
- Entry Forbidden (1941)
- Háry János (1941)
- Yellow Rose (1941)
- Silenced Bells (1941)
- Left-Handed Angel (1941)
- Today, Yesterday and Tomorrow (1941)
- Prince Bob (1941)
- Katyi (1942)
- Lóránd Fráter (1942)
- A Heart Stops Beating (1942)
- Kádár Versus Kerekes (1942)
- Annamária (1943)
- Black Dawn (1943)
- Quite a Lad (1943)
- Suburban Guard Post (1943)
- African Bride (1944)
- Masterless Woman (1944)
- Wedding March (1944)
- After the Storm (1945)
- Prophet of the Fields (1947)
- Storm (1952)
- Fourteen Lives (1954)
- Dollar Daddy (1956)
- Merry-Go-Round (1956)
- Professor Hannibal (1956)
- A Bird of Heaven (1958)
- The Smugglers (1958)
- A Husband for Susy (1960)
- Land of Angels (1962)
- The Moneymaker (1964)
- Car Crazy (1965)
- Háry János (1965)

== Bibliography ==
- Laura, Ernesto G. Tutti i film di Venezia, 1932–1984. La Biennale, Settore cinema e spettacolo televisivo, 1985.
- Petrie, Graham. History Must Answer to Man: The Contemporary Hungarian Cinema. Corvina Kiadó, 1981.
