= Baptism of Fire (1952 film) =

1952 film

- Directed by: Frigyes Bán
- Written by: Ernő Urbán
- Produced by: Jenő Katona
- Starring: József Bihari; Gyula Gózon; Zoltán Makláry
- Cinematography: György Illés
- Edited by: Mihály Morell
- Music by: Ferenc Farkas
- Production company: Mafilm
- Distributed by: Mokép
- Release date: 23 February 1952
- Running time: 99 minutes
- Country: Hungary
- Language: Hungarian

Baptism of Fire (Hungarian: Tüzkeresztség) is a 1952 Hungarian drama film directed by Frigyes Bán and starring József Bihari, Gyula Gózon and Zoltán Makláry. It was shot at the Hunnia Studios in Budapest. The film's sets were designed by the art director Imre Sőrés.

== Synopsis ==
Ahead of harvest time, a farmer who owns a medium-sized property announces that he will be joining a co-operative. This leads to outrage amongst the larger landowners who fear that all the smallholders will follow his example.

== Cast ==
- József Bihari as Köröm Sándor, a szövetkezet elnöke
- Gyula Gózon as Viszket Jakab
- Zoltán Makláry as Boda Pál
- Erzsi Pápai as Marika, Boziné lánya
- Klára Pápai as Boziné, a párttitkárnõ
- Sándor Deák as Ható Ignác
- Manyi Kiss as Hatóné
- Imre Surányi as Imre
- László Bánhidi as Fuvaros Szél János
- István Egri as Kapitány András
- Éva Kelemen as Szijjártóné Schár Lidi
- Sándor Tompa as Szijjártó
- Gellért Raksányi as Misa
- László Hlatky as Zsiga Vendel
- Irma Vass as Özvegy Bokorné

== Bibliography ==
- Balski, Grzegorz . Directory of Eastern European Film-makers and Films 1945-1991. Flicks Books, 1992.
- Homoródy, József. Magyar film, 1948-1963. Filmtudományi Intézet, 1964.
