= We'll Know By Midnight =

1942 film

- Directed by: László Cserépy
- Written by: Pál Barabás
- Produced by: Ernö Gottesmann
- Starring: Erzsi Simor; Elma Bulla; Gyula Csortos
- Cinematography: Barnabás Hegyi
- Edited by: László Cserépy
- Music by: Szabolcs Fényes
- Production companies: Cserépy Film; Magyar Film Iroda
- Release date: 13 August 1942
- Running time: 81 minutes
- Country: Hungary
- Language: Hungarian

We'll Know By Midnight (Hungarian: Éjfélre kiderül) is a 1942 Hungarian drama film directed by László Cserépy and starring Erzsi Simor, Elma Bulla and Gyula Csortos. It was shot at the Hunnia Studios in Budapest.

== Cast ==
- Erzsi Simor as Mrs.Donáth
- Elma Bulla as Mrs. Kállai
- Gyula Csortos as Mr. president
- Vali Rácz as Molly, kept of the president
- Árpád Lehotay as Mr. Donáth
- József Timár as Kállai counselor
- Nóra Ajtay as Emma, guest at Donáths'
- Lajos Alszeghy as husband of Manci
- Margit Beleznay as guest at Donáths'
- Gyula Benkö as painter, love Manci
- Emmi Buttykay as Molly, maid
- Rózsi Csikós as Bálint Ria, actor, bride of Sós
- Ilona Dajbukát as Manci
- Piri Déghy as not a jealous wife
- Béla Fáy as driver of the president
- Miklós Hajmássy as Sós Tibor, actor
- Gusztáv Harasztos as Medár chief physician, guest at Donáths'
- Gitta Hódy as Böske, maid of Donáths'
- József Medgyessy as resident
- Emmi Nagy as maid of Kállai
- Viola Orbán as quarrelsome wife
- Sándor Pethes as not jealous husband
- Gertrúd Romváry as waitress in espresso bar
- Andor Sárossy as quarrelsome wife
- Gusztáv Vándory as jeweller
- Margit Vándory as houskeeper of Sós
- Dóra Várady
- Marika Gálffy
- Lajosné Bónis

== Bibliography ==
- Juhász, István. Kincses magyar filmtár 1931-1944: az eredeti forgatókönyvből 1931 és 1944 között létrejött hazai mozgóképekről. Kráter, 2007.
- Rîpeanu, Bujor. (ed.) International Directory of Cinematographers, Set- and Costume Designers in Film: Hungary (from the beginnings to 1988). Saur, 1981.
