= Yellow Rose (1941 film) =

1941 film

- Directed by: István György
- Written by: Zsigmond Móricz
- Based on: Yellow Rose by Mór Jókai
- Produced by: Béla Lévay
- Starring: Éva Szörényi; Zoltán Greguss; Gyula Szöreghy
- Cinematography: Károly Vass
- Edited by: Lajos Paál
- Music by: Lajos Ákom
- Production company: Léna Film
- Release date: 25 March 1941
- Running time: 75 minutes
- Country: Hungary
- Language: Hungarian

Yellow Rose (Hungarian: Sárga rózsa) is a 1941 Hungarian drama film directed by István György and starring Éva Szörényi, Zoltán Greguss and Gyula Szöreghy. The film's sets were designed by the art director Dezsõ Bariss. It is based on the 1893 novel of the same title by Mór Jókai.

== Cast ==
- Éva Szörényi as Klári
- Zoltán Greguss as Lacza Ferkó
- Gyula Szöreghy as Vásári csizmaárus
- Lajos Gárday as öreg gulyás
- János Görbe as Kocsmáslegény
- György Hajnal as Ambrus bácsi, kocsmai vendég
- Gyözö Kabókas Tiszai átkelõnél pletykáló férfi
- Márta Kormos as Cipra, cigánylány
- Lajos Köpeczi Boócz as Kocsmáros
- Endre Markovits as Halász
- László Misoga as Morva úr
- Ibolya Orbán as Mézeskalács árus a vásáron
- Ferenc Pataki as Révész
- Miklós Pataki as Lódoktor
- József Pataky as öreg csikós
- Teri Radó as Mézeskalács árus a vásáron
- Dániel Skultéty as Tiszai átkelönél pletykáló férfi
- Zoltán Szakáts as Biztos
- Dezsö Szalóky as A tiszai átkelönél pletykáló bácsi
- István Szegedi Szabó as Morva úr
- Gyula Zordon as Orvos

== Bibliography ==
- Juhász, István. Kincses magyar filmtár 1931-1944: az eredeti forgatókönyvből 1931 és 1944 között létrejött hazai mozgóképekről. Kráter, 2007.
- Rîpeanu, Bujor. (ed.) International Directory of Cinematographers, Set- and Costume Designers in Film: Hungary (from the beginnings to 1988). Saur, 1981.
