= Margit Ladomerszky =

Hungarian actress (1904–1979)

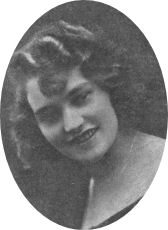
- Born: 17 December 1904; Budapest, Austria-Hungary
- Died: 10 October 1979 (aged 74); Budapest, Hungary
- Occupation: Actress

Margit Ladomerszky (17 December 1904 – 10 October 1979) was a Hungarian actress.

== Selected filmography ==
- Spring Shower (1932)
- The Ghost Train (1933)
- Romance of Ida (1934)
- The Man Under the Bridge (1936)
- My Daughter Is Different (1937)
- Sweet Revenge (1937)
- The Red Wallet (1938)
- Rosemary (1938)
- The Village Rogue (1938)
- Two Prisoners (1938)
- Istvan Bors (1939)
- Six Weeks of Happiness (1939)
- The Ball Is On (1939)
- Wedding in Toprin (1939)
- The Last of the Vereczkeys (1940)
- Gül Baba (1940)
- Sarajevo (1940)
- Money Talks (1940)
- Sister Beáta (1941)
- At the End of September (1942)
- Mountain Girl (1942)
- Changing the Guard (1942)
- Dr. Kovács István (1942)
- At the Crossroads (1942)
- I Dreamed of You (1943)
- The Song of Rákóczi (1943)
- The Night Serenade (1943)
- It Happened in Budapest (1944)
- Knock on the Window (1944)
- Half a Boy (1944)
- After the Storm (1945)
- The Marriage of Katalin Kis (1950)
- The First Swallows (1953)
- A hamis Izabella (1968)
