= Cserebere =

- Directed by: László Cserépy
- Written by: Jenö Horváth
- Starring: Kálmán Latabár; Bella Bordy; Manyi Kiss
- Music by: Dénes Zakál
- Distributed by: Magyar Film Iroda
- Release date: 13 November 1940
- Running time: 87 minutes
- Country: Hungary
- Language: Hungarian

Cserebere is a 1940 Hungarian comedy film directed by László Cserépy and starring Kálmán Latabár, Bella Bordy and Manyi Kiss.

== Main cast ==
- Bella Bordy ... Zsolnay Vera
- László Szilassy ... Kerekes István
- Manyi Kiss ... Panni, Vera barátnõje
- Kálmán Latabár ... Tatár István
- Béla Mihályffi ... Zsolnay (as Mihályffy Béla)
- Lajos Köpeczi Boócz ... Gyárigazgató, Panni apja (as Köpeczy-Boócz Lajos)
- Zoltán Makláry ... Cicvarek, fõpincér
