= Prophet of the Fields =

1947 film

- Directed by: Frigyes Bán
- Written by: Frigyes Bán
- Based on: Prophet of the Fields by Áron Tamási
- Produced by: Béla Lévay
- Starring: Eva Bartok; Árpád Lehotay; Gyula Benkö
- Cinematography: Árpád Makay
- Edited by: Mihály Morell
- Music by: Viktor Vaszy
- Production company: Sarló Film
- Release date: 1947
- Running time: 84 minutes
- Country: Hungary
- Language: Hungarian

Prophet of the Fields (Hungarian: Mezei próféta) is a 1947 Hungarian drama film directed by Frigyes Bán and starring Eva Bartok, Árpád Lehotay and Gyula Benkö. It was made with the backing of the National Peasant Party and based on a populist novel by Áron Tamási. It was shot at the Hunnia Studios in Budapest.

== Cast ==
- Eva Bartok as Boróka
- Árpád Lehotay as Butyka Lázár
- Gyula Benkö as Erõss Gábor
- József Bihari as Nikita neighbor
- László Bánhidi as pilgrim
- Sándor Tompa as headborough
- Ferenc Táray as uncle Ambrus
- István Lontay
- János Maár
- László Misoga
- József Pataky

== Bibliography ==
- Cunningham, John. Hungarian Cinema: From Coffee House to Multiplex. Wallflower Press, 2004.
- Liehm, Mira & Liehm, Antonín J. The Most Important Art: Soviet and Eastern European Film After 1945. University of California Press, 1980.
