= József Bihari =

Hungarian actor

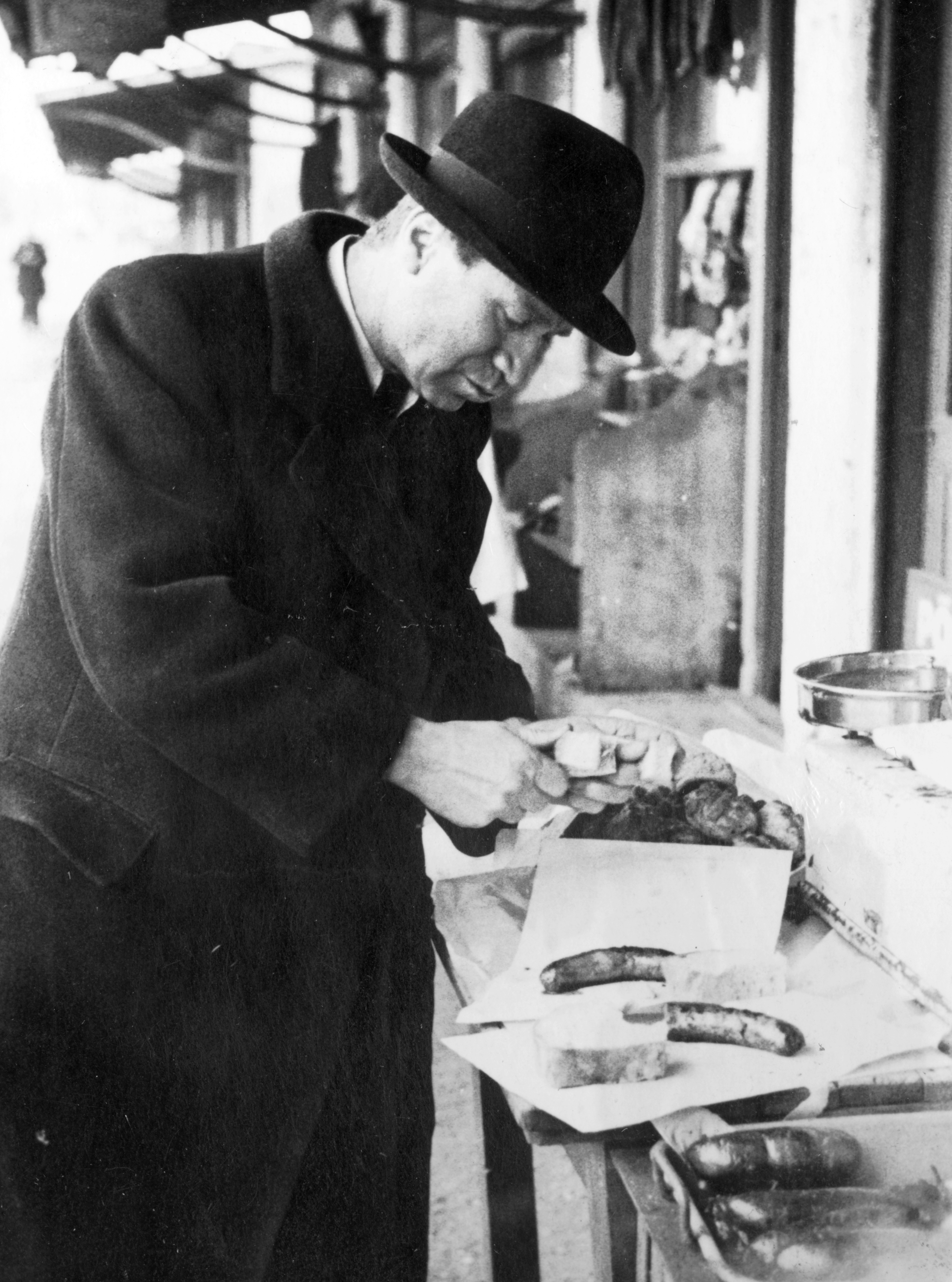
József Bihari in Pestszentlőrinc (1939)

József Bihari (1901–1981) was a Hungarian actor.

== Selected filmography ==
- St. Peter's Umbrella (1935)
- My Daughter Is Different (1937)
- All Men Are Crazy (1937)
- The Golden Man (1936)
- The Village Rogue (1938)
- Bence Uz (1938)
- The Witch of Leányvár (1938)
- Istvan Bors (1939)
- Wedding in Toprin (1939)
- Deadly Spring (1939)
- Duel for Nothing (1940)
- Haunting Spirit (1940)
- Closed Court (1940)
- Castle in Transylvania (1940)
- People of the Mountains (1942)
- Guard House Number 5 (1942)
- The Talking Robe (1942)
- A Message from the Volga Shore (1942)
- Rózsa Nemes (1943)
- Machita (1944)
- Song of the Cornfields (1947)
- Prophet of the Fields (1947)
- Singing Makes Life Beautiful (1950)
- A Strange Marriage (1951)
- Underground Colony (1951)
- Erkel (1952)
- Storm (1952)
- Baptism of Fire (1952)
- Under the City (1953)
- Love Travels by Coach (1955)
- The Bridge of Life (1956)
- The House Under the Rocks (1958)
- For Whom the Larks Sing (1959)
- Be True Until Death (1960)
- Egyiptomi történet (1963)
- Twenty Hours (1965)
- The Upthrown Stone (1969)
- Sons of Fire (1974)
- Magyarok (1978)
- Cserepek (1980)

== Bibliography ==
- Simon, Andrew L. Made in Hungary: Hungarian Contributions to Universal Culture. Simon Publications, 1998.
