= Duel for Nothing =

1940 film

- Directed by: Emil Martonffy
- Written by: Sándor Hunyady (novel); Johann von Vásáry
- Starring: Gyula Csortos; Lili Berky; Alice Nagy; Artúr Somlay
- Cinematography: Rudolf Icsey
- Edited by: Zoltán Farkas
- Music by: Dezső Losonczy
- Production company: Magyar Film Iroda
- Release date: 7 March 1940
- Running time: 1h 22m
- Country: Hungary
- Language: Hungarian

Duel for Nothing (Hungarian: Párbaj semmiért) is a Hungarian drama film released on 7 March 1940, with a running time of 1 hour and 22 minutes. The film was directed by Emil Martonffy and stars Gyula Csortos, Lili Berky, Alice Nagy, and Artur Somlay. The screenplay was written by Sándor Hunyady and Johann von Vásáry and is based on Hunyady's novel. The music was composed by Dezső Losonczy. Zoltán Farkas served as the film editor, while Rudolf Icsey was responsible for the cinematography. The film was produced by Magyar Film Iroda.

== Cast ==
- Gyula Csortos as Török Kálmán
- Lili Berky as Törökné
- Alice Nagy as Kati, Törökék lánya
- Artúr Somlay as Csaholy Kelemen báró
- Piri Vaszary as Csaholyné, Emma
- Jenö Pataky as Gazsi, Csaholyék fia
- József Bihari as Balázs
- Sándor Tompa as Plébános
- László Misoga as Rudi, cigány
- Lajos Köpeczi Boócz as Állatorvos
- Gusztáv Pártos as Angol kutyakereskedõ
- Sándor Pethes as Gyógyszerész
- Endre C. Turáni as Parasztfiú
- István Falussy as Lóversenyfogadó
- Gyözö Kabók as öreg parasztember
- Ferenc Pethes as Lajos
- Dezsö Szalóky as öreg parasztember
- Gusztáv Vándory as Párbajsegéd
