= András (film) =

1941 film

- Directed by: Viktor Bánky
- Written by: Károly Nóti; Miklós Tóth
- Produced by: Miklós Szalontai Kiss
- Starring: Antal Páger; Bella Bordy; Valéria Hidvéghy
- Cinematography: Árpád Makay
- Edited by: Viktor Bánky
- Music by: Ottó Vincze
- Production company: Mester Film
- Release date: 29 April 1941
- Running time: 83 minutes
- Country: Hungary
- Language: Hungarian

András is a 1941 Hungarian comedy drama film directed by Viktor Bánky and starring Antal Páger, Bella Bordy and Valéria Hidvéghy. The film's sets were designed by the art director Dezsõ Bariss.

== Synopsis ==
A secretary is mistaken for a nobleman at a party, leading to his appointment as the estate steward of an agricultural estate. He manages to turn around the failing estate's fortunes, but attracts the jealousy of the director.

== Cast ==
- Antal Páger as Laczkó András
- Bella Bordy as Kató typist
- Valéria Hidvéghy as Lili, Szalkay's daughter
- Gyula Csortos as Mr. Korompay chairman
- József Timár as Richter director
- Béla Mihályffi as Szalkay Gusztáv managing director
- Mária Szemlér as Mari typist
- Lajos Köpeczi Boócz as Demeter estate manager
- Sándor Hidassy as clerk
- György Nagyajtay as Kovács István secretary to the managing director
- Gyula Köváry as clerk
- József Mátray as baron Kázmér party guest
- Ferenc Szécsi as Viheczky clerk

== Bibliography ==
- Judson, Pieter and M. Rozenblit, Marsha L. (ed). Constructing Nationalities in East Central Europe. Berghahn Books, 2005.
- Juhász, István. Kincses magyar filmtár 1931-1944: az eredeti forgatókönyvből 1931 és 1944 között létrejött hazai mozgóképekről. Kráter, 2007.
- Rîpeanu, Bujor. (ed.) International Directory of Cinematographers, Set- and Costume Designers in Film: Hungary (from the beginnings to 1988). Saur, 1981.
