= The Unquiet Night =

1940 film

- Directed by: Frigyes Bán
- Written by: Frigyes Bán; János Zalabéri Horváth
- Produced by: Ernõ Teichmann; János Zalabéri Horváth
- Starring: Klári Tolnay; Gábor Rajnay; Tivadar Bilicsi
- Cinematography: Rudolf Icsey
- Edited by: László Katonka
- Music by: Béla Dolecskó
- Production company: Magyar Film Iroda
- Release date: 15 August 1940
- Running time: 85 minutes
- Country: Hungary
- Language: Hungarian

The Unquiet Night (Hungarian: Zavaros éjszaka) is a 1940 Hungarian drama film directed by Frigyes Bán and starring Klári Tolnay, Gábor Rajnay and Tivadar Bilicsi. It was shot at the Hunnia Studios in Budapest. The film's sets were designed by the art director István Básthy.

== Cast ==
- Klári Tolnay as Buday Klári
- Gábor Rajnay as Buday bankár, Klári apja
- Tivadar Bilicsi as Hajnally Ödön, Klári võlegénye
- Jenö Pataky as Lendvay Gábor, újságíró
- Zoltán Makláry as Kiss Benõ
- Valéria Hidvéghy as Manci
- Zoltán Várkonyi as Betörõ
- Ferenc Pethes as Házmester
- Béla Fáy as Rendõr
- Kató Szederkényi as Trafikos hölgy
- Marcsa Simon
- Ilona Kökény
- Gyula Kompóthy
- Gyula Abay
- Rezsõ Acsay

== Bibliography ==
- Balski, Grzegorz. Directory of Eastern European Film-makers and Films 1945-1991. Flicks Books, 1992.
- Juhász, István. Kincses magyar filmtár 1931-1944: az eredeti forgatókönyvből 1931 és 1944 között létrejött hazai mozgóképekről. Kráter, 2007.
- Rîpeanu, Bujor. (ed.) International Directory of Cinematographers, Set- and Costume Designers in Film: Hungary (from the beginnings to 1988). Saur, 1981.
