= Orient Express (1943 film) =

- Directed by: László Cserépy
- Written by: Andor Matolcsy (play)
- Starring: Andor Ajtay; Irén Pelsöczy; Gyula Csortos
- Music by: Béla Dolecskó
- Distributed by: Délibáb Filmgyártó és Kölcsönzõ Kft
- Release date: 22 July 1943
- Running time: 84 minutes
- Country: Hungary
- Language: Hungarian

Orient Express is a 1943 Hungarian drama film directed by László Cserépy and starring Andor Ajtay, Irén Pelsöczy and Gyula Csortos. It is based on a play by Andor Matolcsy about events taking place on the Orient Express.

== Cast ==
- Andor Ajtay ... Szilágyi Péter
- Irén Pelsöczy ... Török Rozi
- Gyula Csortos ... Török Samu
- Piri Vaszary ... Mrs. Török Ilona
- Sándor Pethes ... Boda Géza
- Nusi Somogyi ... Mrs Boda
- Géza Berczy ... actor
