= A Heart Stops Beating =

1942 film directed by László Kalmár

- Directed by: László Kalmár
- Written by: Adorján Bónyi (novel); József Babay
- Produced by: Mária Hausz
- Starring: Katalin Karády; Tivadar Uray; Árpád Lehotay
- Cinematography: Árpád Makay
- Music by: Dénes Buday
- Production company: Cserépy Film
- Release date: 22 December 1942
- Running time: 79 minutes
- Country: Hungary
- Language: Hungarian

A Heart Stops Beating (Hungarian: Egy szív megáll) is a 1942 Hungarian drama film directed by László Kalmár and starring Katalin Karády, Tivadar Uray and Árpád Lehotay. It was shot at the Hunnia Studios in Budapest. The film's sets were designed by the art director Ferenc Daday.

== Cast ==
- Katalin Karády as Anna
- Tivadar Uray as Futó Lajos - Anna férje
- István Nagy as Dr. Monostori
- Árpád Lehotay as Bakkari - impresszárió
- Tibor Halmay as Pál
- Ferenc Pethes as Péter
- Manyi Kiss as Pallósné színésznõ
- László Pálóczi as Pallós,bonviván
- Zoltán Makláry as Köszörûs
- László Misoga as Bûvész
- Margit Vágóné as Házvezetõnõ

== Bibliography ==
- Juhász, István. Kincses magyar filmtár 1931-1944: az eredeti forgatókönyvből 1931 és 1944 között létrejött hazai mozgóképekről. Kráter, 2007.
- Rîpeanu, Bujor. (ed.) International Directory of Cinematographers, Set- and Costume Designers in Film: Hungary (from the beginnings to 1988). Saur, 1981.
- Taylor, Richard (ed.) The BFI companion to Eastern European and Russian cinema. British Film Institute, 2000.
