= The First Swallows =

1953 film

- Directed by: Frigyes Bán
- Written by: Miklós Gyárfás
- Produced by: István Lénárt; Ferenc Pless
- Starring: József Juhász; Sándor Tompa; István Rozsos
- Cinematography: István Eiben
- Edited by: Mária Szécsényi
- Music by: Szabolcs Fényes
- Production company: Mafilm
- Release date: 5 March 1953
- Running time: 93 minutes
- Country: Hungary
- Language: Hungarian

The First Swallows (Hungarian: Első fecskék) is a 1953 Hungarian comedy film directed by Frigyes Bán and starring József Juhász, Sándor Tompa and István Rozsos. It was shot at the Hunnia Studios in Budapest. The film's sets were designed by the art director Imre Sőrés.

== Cast ==
- József Juhász as Andorkó
- Sándor Tompa as Bartalos
- István Rozsos as Csete
- Kamill Feleki as Patak
- Margit Ladomerszky as Patakné
- Ferenc Kállai as Patak Pista
- Zoltán Makláry as Fitos
- Nóra Kováts as Fitos Juli
- Sándor Deák as Fõmérnök
- Pál Beszterczei as Kockás
- Mária Rákosi as Kopek Erzsi
- Gyula Árkos as Vitányi

== Bibliography ==
- Balski, Grzegorz . Directory of Eastern European Film-makers and Films 1945-1991. Flicks Books, 1992.
- Homoródy, József. Magyar film, 1948-1963. Filmtudományi Intézet, 1964.
- Rîpeanu, Bujor. (ed.) International Directory of Cinematographers, Set- and Costume Designers in Film: Hungary (from the beginnings to 1988). Saur, 1981.
