= Ferenc Pethes =

Hungarian actor

- Born: 8 August 1905; Nagykörös, Austria-Hungary
- Died: 21 March 1979 (aged 73); Budapest, Hungary
- Occupation: Actor
- Years active: 1932–1977 (film & TV)

Ferenc Pethes (1905–1979) was a Hungarian stage and film actor. A character actor, he appeared in supporting roles in more than a hundred Hungarian film productions. He also acted in a variety of theatre venues. He was the cousin of the actor Sándor Pethes.

== Selected filmography ==
- The Wise Mother (1935)
- Thanks for Knocking Me Down (1935)
- Son of the Pusta (1936)
- The Borrowed Castle (1937)
- Tales of Budapest (1937)
- Help, I'm an Heiress (1937)
- Hotel Springtime (1937)
- Young Noszty and Mary Toth (1938)
- Marika (1938)
- The Lady Is a Bit Cracked (1938)
- The Wrong Man (1938)
- Billeting (1938)
- Rézi Friday (1938)
- The Red Wallet (1938)
- The Witch of Leányvár (1938)
- Barbara in America (1938)
- No Coincidence (1939)
- Wildflowers of Gyimes (1939)
- Flower of the Tisza (1939)
- Wedding in Toprin (1939)
- Wild Rose (1939)
- Six Weeks of Happiness (1939)
- Money Is Coming (1939)
- The Perfect Man (1939)
- Istvan Bors (1939)
- Hello, Peter! (1939)
- Closed Court (1940)
- The Chequered Coat (1940)
- The Bercsenyi Hussars (1940)
- Duel for Nothing (1940)
- The Unquiet Night (1940)
- Everybody Loves Someone Else (1940)
- Gábor Göre Returns (1940)
- Castle in Transylvania (1940)
- Unknown Opponent (1940)
- Rózsafabot (1940)
- On the Way Home (1940)
- Europe Doesn't Answer (1941)
- Taken by the Flood (1941)
- Three Bells (1941)
- Entry Forbidden (1941)
- Háry János (1941)
- Property for Sale (1941)
- Deadly Kiss (1942)
- A Message from the Volga Shore (1942)
- A Heart Stops Beating (1942)
- Sabotage (1942)
- Guard House Number 5 (1942)
- Annamária (1943)
- Quite a Lad (1943)
- The Night Girl (1943)
- Storm (1952)
- Rakoczy's Lieutenant (1954)

== Bibliography ==
- Bondy, Frederick. The Writers, Artists, Singers, and Musicians of the National Hungarian Jewish Cultural Association (OMIKE), 1939–1944. Purdue University Press, 2016.
- Laura, Ernesto G. Tutti i film di Venezia, 1932–1984. La Biennale, Settore cinema e spettacolo televisivo, 1985.
