= Flower of the Tisza =

1939 Hungarian film

- Directed by: Géza von Bolváry
- Written by: Michael Zorn (novel); Lajos Bíró; Hans Gustl Kernmayr; Sándor Várady Szabó; Géza von Bolváry
- Produced by: Dezső Ákos Hamza; László Sipos
- Starring: Klári Tolnay; József Juhász; Árpád Lehotay
- Cinematography: Werner Brandes
- Edited by: Hermann Haller
- Music by: Dénes Buday
- Production companies: Hunnia Filmgyár; Spectrum Film
- Release date: 9 February 1939
- Running time: 82 minutes
- Country: Hungary
- Language: Hungarian

Flower of the Tisza (Hungarian: Tiszavirág) is a 1939 Hungarian romantic drama film directed by Géza von Bolváry and starring Klári Tolnay, József Juhász and Árpád Lehotay. It was shot at the Hunnia Studios in Budapest and on location around Szeged. The film's sets were designed by the art director Imre Sőrés. A separate German-language version, Zwischen Strom und Steppe, was also released.

== Cast ==
- Klári Tolnay as Aracsiné, Julis
- József Juhász as Aracsi Sándor - halász
- Árpád Lehotay as Rostás Péter
- Zsóka Ölvedy as Ágnes
- Margit Symo as Cigánylány
- Zoltán Greguss as Laci - cigánylegény
- István Bársony as Halász
- Ilona Dajbukát as Veronika - István felesége
- Hilda Gobbi as Cigányasszony
- György Gonda as Lovas pásztor
- Zoltán Hosszú as Kocsmáros
- Lajos Kelemen as István, Julis bátyja
- Lajos Köpeczi Boócz as Balogh, jegyzõ
- Ferenc Pethes as Ostort vásárló paraszt
- Kálmán Rózsahegyi as Halász
- Marcsa Simon as Halászfeleség
- Dezsö Szalóky as Koldus
- Ferenc Szécsi as Halász
- Lajos Ujváry as Boltos
- Ferenc Vendrey as Révész
- Gusztáv Vándory as Falusi orvos

== Bibliography ==
- Juhász, István. Kincses magyar filmtár 1931-1944: az eredeti forgatókönyvből 1931 és 1944 között létrejött hazai mozgóképekről. Kráter, 2007.
- Rîpeanu, Bujor. (ed.) International Directory of Cinematographers, Set- and Costume Designers in Film: Hungary (from the beginnings to 1988). Saur, 1981.
- Waldman, Harry. Nazi Films in America, 1933-1942. McFarland, 2008.
