= Wedding in Toprin =

1939 film

- Directed by: Andre de Toth
- Written by: Gyula Csermely (novel); André de Toth; István Mihály
- Produced by: Béla Lévay
- Starring: Klári Tolnay; Pál Jávor; Ferenc Kiss
- Cinematography: István Eiben
- Edited by: Zoltán Farkas
- Music by: Szabolcs Fényes
- Production company: Photophon Film
- Release date: 4 May 1939
- Running time: 90 minutes
- Country: Hungary
- Language: Hungarian

Wedding in Toprin (Hungarian: Toprini nász) is a 1939 Hungarian spy adventure film directed by André de Toth and starring Klári Tolnay, Pál Jávor and Ferenc Kiss. The film's sets were designed by the art director Márton Vincze. It was released in the United States where it enjoyed success with Hungarian emigrants and covered its production costs twice over.

== Cast ==
- Klári Tolnay as A gróf felesége
- Pál Jávor as Mányay Imre fõhadnagy
- Ferenc Kiss as Toprin grófja
- Imre Apáthi as Erdélyi Gábor hadnagy
- József Bihari as Ispán
- Ferenc Hoykó as Patikus
- Panni Kéry as Ulka
- Lajos Kelemen as Csendõr
- Mária Keresztessy as A grófné anyja
- Margit Ladomerszky as Az ezredes felesége
- Zoltán Makláry as Lubolin
- Zsóka Ölvedy as Corinna, az ezredes lánya
- Attila Petheö as Ezredes
- Ferenc Pethes as Szasa
- Vali Rácz as Lola
- Nusi Somogyi as Natasar
- Péter Szõts D. as Orosz rendõrfõnök
- Gyula Zordon as Fötiszt

== Bibliography ==
- Cunningham, John. Hungarian Cinema: From Coffee House to Multiplex. Wallflower Press, 2004.
- Juhász, István. Kincses magyar filmtár 1931-1944: az eredeti forgatókönyvből 1931 és 1944 között létrejött hazai mozgóképekről. Kráter, 2007.
- Rîpeanu, Bujor. (ed.) International Directory of Cinematographers, Set- and Costume Designers in Film: Hungary (from the beginnings to 1988). Saur, 1981.
