= Underground Colony =

1951 film

- Directed by: Károly Makk; Mihály Szemes
- Produced by: Mrs. Miklós Vitéz
- Starring: József Bihari; Erzsi Orsolya; Ferenc Ladányi
- Cinematography: Ottó Forgács
- Edited by: Mihály Morell
- Music by: István Sárközy
- Production company: Mafilm
- Distributed by: Mokép
- Release date: 16 September 1951
- Running time: 93 minutes
- Country: Hungary
- Language: Hungarian

Underground Colony (Hungarian: Gyarmat a föld alatt) is a 1951 Hungarian drama film directed by Károly Makk and Mihály Szemes and starring József Bihari, Erzsi Orsolya and Ferenc Ladányi. It was shot at the Hunnia Studios in Budapest. The film's sets were designed by the art director Imre Sőrés.

== Cast ==
- József Bihari as Barla, mérnök
- Erzsi Orsolya as Barláné
- Ferenc Ladányi as Nyerges, a MAKIRT termelési felelõse
- Sándor Suka as Környe
- István Palotai as Simics
- Lörinc Deák as Államtitkár
- József Juhász as Öreg munkás
- Lajos Rajczy as Kristófi, ÁVH vezérezredes
- Gyula Benkö as Budai örnagy
- Antal Farkas as ÁVH õrmester
- Lajos Mányai as Dalton
- Andor Ajtay as Pápay
- László Földényi as Brudermann
- Zoltán Greguss as Forray
- Ferenc Bessenyei as Strumpf
- Ferenc Pálffi as Mitók
- István Somló as Shaweross
- Sándor Peti as Portás
- Emil Keres as Kovács

== Bibliography ==
- Appplebaum, Anne. Iron Curtain: The Crushing of Eastern Europe 1944-56. Penguin UK, 2012.
- Liehm, Mira & Liehm, Antonín J. The Most Important Art: Soviet and Eastern European Film After 1945. University of California Press, 1980.
- Ostrowska, Dorota, Pitassio, Francesco & Varga, Zsuzsanna. Popular Cinemas in East Central Europe: Film Cultures and Histories. Bloomsbury Publishing, 2017
- Wakeman, John. World Film Directors: 1945-1985. H.W. Wilson, 1987.
