= Imre Sörés =

Hungarian art director

Imre Sőrés
- Born: 3 January 1907; Rákoscsaba, Austria-Hungary
- Died: 8 April 1986 (aged 79); Budapest, Hungary
- Occupation: Art director
- Years active: 1938–1957 (film)

Imre Sőrés (1907–1986) was a Hungarian art director. He worked in the Hungarian film industry designing film sets for productions from the Horthy era to the postwar Communist period, generally at the Hunnia Studios in Budapest.

== Selected filmography ==
- The Red Wallet (1938)
- Flower of the Tisza (1939)
- Between River and Steppe (1939)
- The Minister's Friend (1939)
- Wildflowers of Gyimes (1939)
- Haunting Spirit (1940)
- On the Way Home (1940)
- Prince Bob (1941)
- Don't Ask Who I Was (1941)
- Old Waltz (1941)
- A Bowl of Lentils (1941)
- Silenced Bells (1941)
- The Dance of Death (1942)
- Beautiful Star (1942)
- I Dreamed of You (1943)
- Suburban Guard Post (1943)
- It Happened in Budapest (1944)
- Half a Boy (1944)
- The Three Doves (1944)
- I'll Make You Happy (1944)
- Devil Rider (1944)
- Full Steam Ahead (1951)
- Underground Colony (1951)
- Baptism of Fire (1952)
- The First Swallows (1953)
- Rakoczy's Lieutenant (1954)
- By Order of the Emperor (1957)
- Spiral Staircase (1957)

== Bibliography ==
- Hayes, R.M. 3-D Movies: A History and Filmography of Stereoscopic Cinema. McFarland, 1998.
- Laura, Ernesto G. Tutti i film di Venezia, 1932–1984. La Biennale, Settore cinema e spettacolo televisivo, 1985.
- Rîpeanu, Bujor. (ed.) International Directory of Cinematographers, Set- and Costume Designers in Film: Hungary (from the beginnings to 1988). Saur, 1981.
