= Wildflowers of Gyimes =

1939 film

- Directed by: Ákos Ráthonyi
- Written by: Károly Aszlányi
- Based on: Wildflowers of Gyimes by István Géczy
- Produced by: Dezsõ Ákos Hamza
- Starring: Klári Tolnay; Zsóka Ölvedy; Gerö Mály
- Cinematography: Károly Vass
- Edited by: Zoltán Farkas
- Music by: Imre Hajdú
- Production company: Hamza Film
- Release date: 12 January 1939
- Running time: 82 minutes
- Country: Hungary
- Language: Hungarian

Wildflowers of Gyimes (Hungarian: Gyimesi vadvirág) is a 1939 Hungarian romantic drama film directed by Ákos Ráthonyi and starring Klári Tolnay, Zsóka Ölvedy and Gerö Mály. It was shot at the Hunnia Studios in Budapest. The film's sets were designed by the art director Imre Sörés. An earlier 1921 silent film had been under the same title.

== Cast ==
- Klári Tolnay as Magdolna, Palánka felesége
- Zsóka Ölvedy as Mária, Palánka húga
- Gerö Mály as Traján, kisbíró
- József Timár as Palánka Imre
- Zoltán Greguss as Fábián Gyula
- Gyula Gózon as Cigányprímás
- Zoltán Hosszú as Magdolna apja
- Lajos Köpeczi Boócz as Kocsmáros
- Lenke Egyed as Fábiánné
- Lajos Kelemen as Éneklõ paraszt
- János Balassa as Cigány
- László Misoga as Cigány
- Ferenc Pethes as Áronka
- Zoltán Makláry as Harangozó
- István Dózsa as Börtönparancsnok
- György Hajnal as Beszélgetõ falusi bácsi
- Géza Rónai as Beszélgetö paraszt

== Bibliography ==
- Juhász, István. Kincses magyar filmtár 1931-1944: az eredeti forgatókönyvből 1931 és 1944 között létrejött hazai mozgóképekről. Kráter, 2007.
- Rîpeanu, Bujor. (ed.) International Directory of Cinematographers, Set- and Costume Designers in Film: Hungary (from the beginnings to 1988). Saur, 1981.
