= Artúr Somlay =

Hungarian actor

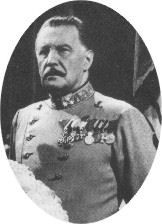
Artúr Somlay

Artúr Somlay (28 February 1883, in Budapest – 10 November 1951, in Budapest) was a Hungarian stage and film actor.

== Selected filmography ==
- Today and Tomorrow (1912)
- Faun (1918)
- Princess Woronzoff (1920)
- The Clan (1920)
- The Railway King (1921)
- The Adventuress of Monte Carlo (1921)
- The Riddle of the Sphinx (1921)
- Ilona (1921)
- The New Landlord (1935)
- Budapest Pastry Shop (1935)
- Harvest (1936)
- The Red Wallet (1938)
- Rosemary (1938)
- The Village Rogue (1938)
- Deadly Spring (1939)
- Duel for Nothing (1940)
- Closed Court (1940)
- Queen Elizabeth (1940)
- Semmelweis (1940)
- Finally! (1941)
- The Gyurkovics Boys (1941)
- Today, Yesterday and Tomorrow (1941)
- Europe Doesn't Answer (1941)
- The Relative of His Excellency (1941)
- Magdolna (1942)
- The Dance of Death (1942)
- At the Crossroads (1942)
- A Woman Looks Back (1942)
- Time of Trial (1942)
- Deadly Kiss (1942)
- Eva Szovathy (1944)
- Without Lies (1946)
- Somewhere in Europe (1948)
- Goose-boy (1950)
- A Strange Marriage (1951)
- West Zone (1952)

== Bibliography ==
- Simon, Andrew L. Made in Hungary: Hungarian Contributions to Universal Culture. Simon Publications, 1998.
