= Rózsafabot =

1940 film

- Directed by: Béla Balogh
- Written by: József Babay
- Produced by: Alfonz Standach
- Starring: Zita Szeleczky; József Timár; Kálmán Rózsahegyi
- Cinematography: Árpád Makay
- Edited by: Péter Pokol
- Music by: Tibor Polgár
- Production companies: Hungarian Filmproduction; Palatinus Filmterjesztõ Vállalat
- Release date: 25 November 1940
- Running time: 86 minutes
- Country: Hungary
- Language: Hungarian

Rózsafabot is a 1940 Hungarian drama film directed by Béla Balogh and starring Zita Szeleczky, József Timár and Kálmán Rózsahegyi. The film's sets were designed by the art director János Pagonyi.

== Cast ==
- Zita Szeleczky as Katalin Sipos
- József Timár as Viktor Pálos
- Kálmán Rózsahegyi as István Berek
- Lili Berky as Anna
- Gyula Gózon as Meller
- Ilona Dajbukát as Mellerné
- József Juhász as József Bosnyák
- Marcsa Simon as József Bosnyák's Mother
- Béla Mihályffi as Prison Director
- Erzsébet Cserba as Terka
- Ferenc Pethes as Railway Employee

== Bibliography ==
- Juhász, István. Kincses magyar filmtár 1931-1944: az eredeti forgatókönyvből 1931 és 1944 között létrejött hazai mozgóképekről. Kráter, 2007.
- Rîpeanu, Bujor. (ed.) International Directory of Cinematographers, Set- and Costume Designers in Film: Hungary (from the beginnings to 1988). Saur, 1981.
