= Andre de Toth =

Hungarian-American film director (1913–2002)

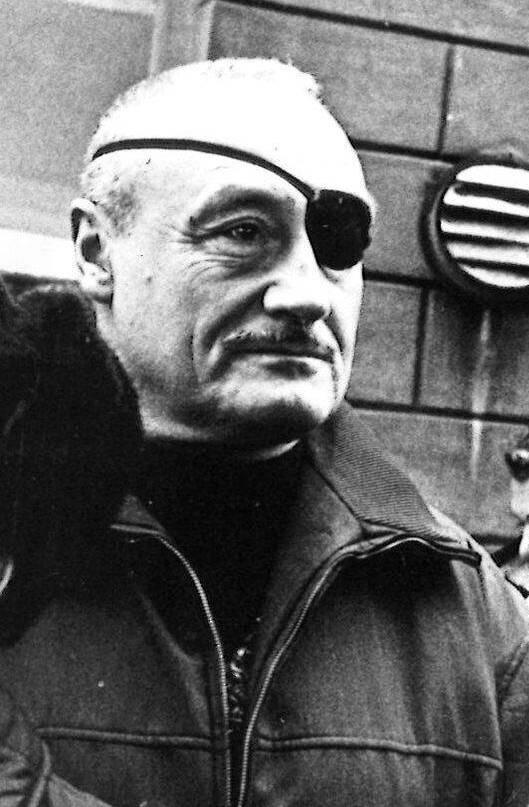
- De Toth in 1967
- Born: Endre Antal Mihály Tóth; May 15, 1913; Makó, Austria-Hungary (now Hungary)
- Died: October 27, 2002 (aged 89); Burbank, California, U.S.
- Other name: Endre Antal Miksa de Toth (Note: Name taken on petition for naturalization; later changed to simply Andre de Toth for actual naturalization.)
- Education: Eötvös Loránd University
- Occupation: Film director
- Years active: 1939–1987
- Spouses: 7, including: Veronica Lake (m. 1944; div. 1952); Marie Louise Stratton (m. 1953; div. 1982); Ann Green (m. 1984)
- Children: 4

Endre Antal Miksa de Toth, known as Andre de Toth (Note: Also styled André De Toth, Andre De Toth, Andre deToth, etc.) (Hungarian: Tóth Endre; May 15, 1913 – October 27, 2002), was a Hungarian-American film director, born and raised in Makó, Austria-Hungary.

He directed the 3D film House of Wax (1953), despite being unable to see in 3D himself, having lost an eye at an early age. Upon naturalization as a United States citizen in 1945, he took "Endre Antal Miksa de Toth" as his legal name.

== Early life ==
Born in 1913 as Sasvári farkasfalvi tóthfalusi Tóth Endre Antal Mihály, de Toth earned a degree in law from the Royal Hungarian Pázmány Péter Science's University in Budapest in the early 1930s. He garnered acclaim for plays written as a college student, acquiring the mentorship of Ferenc Molnár and becoming part of the theater scene in Budapest.

== Career ==
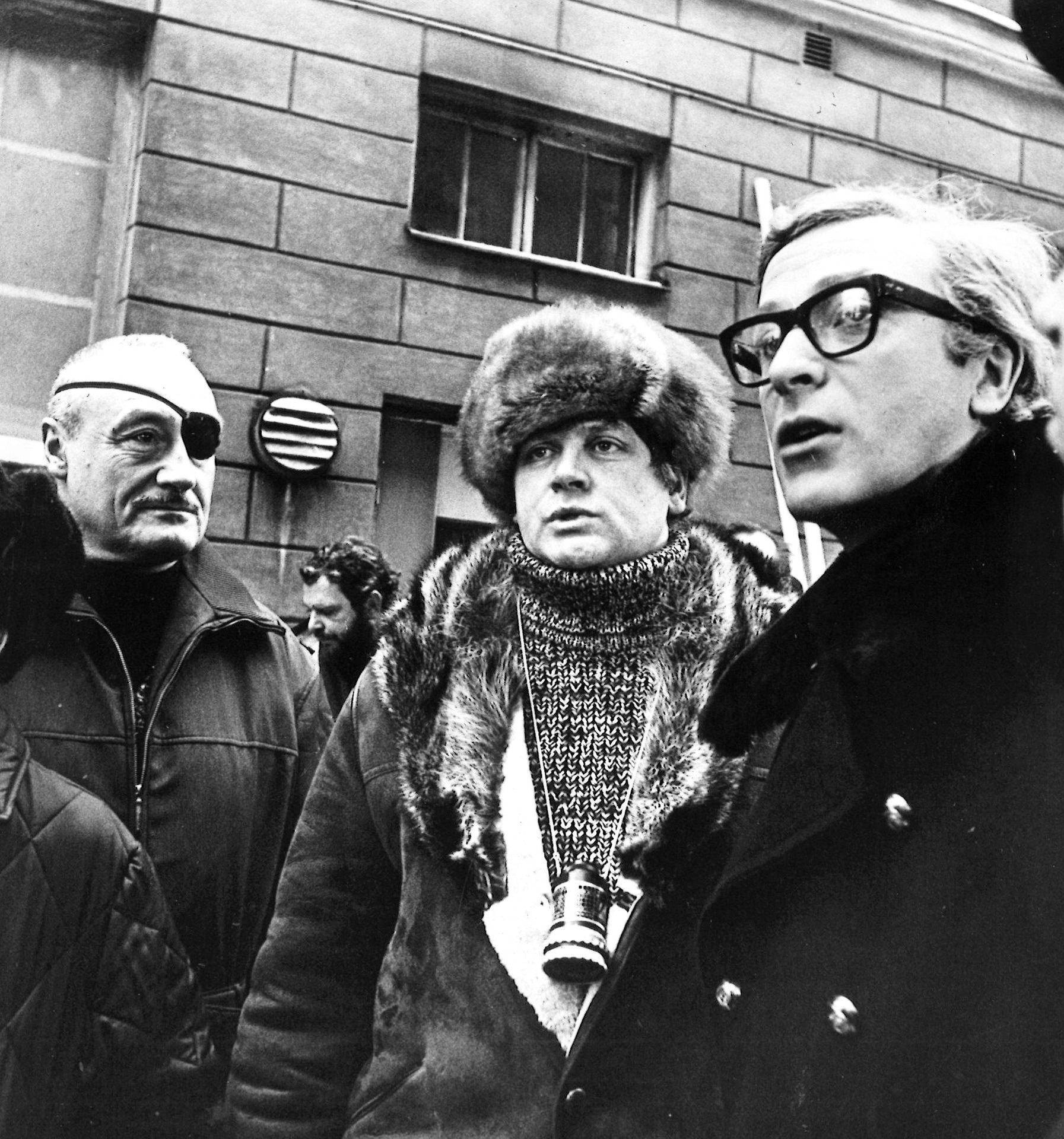
Producer de Toth, director Ken Russell, and actor Michael Caine in Helsinki during the shooting of Billion Dollar Brain in 1967—on Sofiankatu, near the police station

De Toth moved on from there to the film industry and worked as a writer, assistant director, editor and sometime actor. In 1939, just before World War II, he directed five films, beginning in Europe. Several of these films received significant release in the Hungarian communities in the United States. De Toth was then sent by the Nazis to film the invasion of Poland. De Toth went to England, where he spent several years as an assistant to fellow Hungarian émigré Alexander Korda, and eventually moved to Los Angeles in 1942.

Based on his Hungarian films, the production work for Korda and writing he had done on American projects during earlier stints in Los Angeles, de Toth received an oral contract as a director at Columbia Pictures from which he ultimately extricated himself by litigation. He preferred working as an independent and had no "A" budgets early in his career. Thus, he had to supplement his directing income with writing assignments, often uncredited. Introduced to Westerns by John Ford, he worked mostly in that genre throughout the 1950s, often bringing elements of noir style into those films.

In 1951, de Toth received an Oscar nomination for Best Writing (with co-writer William Bowers) for the story filmed as The Gunfighter.

While largely remembered as the director of the earliest and most successful 3D film, House of Wax, de Toth also directed the noir films Pitfall (1948) and Crime Wave (1954).

He later returned to the European film industry, mainly with Italian productions, and also directed the war action film Play Dirty starring Michael Caine and Nigel Davenport.

In 1996, Faber and Faber published his memoir, Fragments – Portraits from the Inside.

== Personal life ==
De Toth lost the sight in one eye and wore a black eyepatch; as a 1994 report in The Independent noted, this led to an almost deadly incident:

The piratical black patch De Toth sports over his left eye almost cost him his life. Scouting for locations in Egypt shortly after the Yom Kippur war of 1973, De Toth was kidnapped, pistol-whipped and interrogated by a group of vengeful young men who had mistaken him for Moyshe Dayan. He only escaped with his life after a quick examination of his groin bore out De Toth's claim that far from being an Israeli commander, he was not even Jewish.

During his seven marriages, de Toth became father and stepfather of 19 children, including editor Nicolas de Toth. He was married to Veronica Lake from 1944 until their divorce in 1952. They had a son, Andre Anthony Michael de Toth III (born 1945) and a daughter, Diana DeToth (born 1948). In 1953 he married the actress Mary Lou Holloway (née Stratton). At the time of his death in 2002, de Toth was married to his seventh wife, Ann Green.

On October 27, 2002, de Toth died from an aneurysm, aged 89. He was interred in Forest Lawn Memorial Park cemetery in the Hollywood Hills.

== Partial filmography ==
- Wedding in Toprin (1939)
- The Five-Forty (1939)
- Two Girls on the Street (1939)
- Six Weeks of Happiness (1939)
- Semmelweis (1940)
- Jungle Book (1942) (second unit director only)
- Passport to Suez (1943)
- None Shall Escape (1944)
- Dark Waters (1944)
- Ramrod (1947)
- The Other Love (1947)
- Pitfall (1948)
- Slattery's Hurricane (1949)
- Man in the Saddle (1951)
- Carson City (1952)
- Springfield Rifle (1952)
- Last of the Comanches (1953)
- House of Wax (1953)
- The Stranger Wore a Gun (1953)
- Thunder Over the Plains (1953)
- Crime Wave (1954)
- Tanganyika (1954)
- Riding Shotgun (1954)
- The Bounty Hunter (1954)
- The Indian Fighter (1955)
- Hidden Fear (1957)
- Monkey on My Back (1957)
- The Two-Headed Spy (1958)
- Day of the Outlaw (1959)
- Man on a String (1960)
- Morgan, the Pirate (Italian title: Morgan il pirata) (1960)
- The Mongols (Italian title: I mongoli) (1961)
- Lawrence of Arabia (1962) (second unit director only - uncredited)
- Gold for the Caesars (Italian title: Oro per i Cesari) (1963)
- Play Dirty (1968)
- Superman (1978) (second unit director only - uncredited)
