= On the Way Home (film) =

1940 film

- Directed by: Arzén von Cserépy
- Written by: Pál Barabás
- Starring: Sári Fedák; Gyula Csortos; Ági Mészáros
- Cinematography: Károly Vass
- Edited by: László Cserépy
- Music by: Dénes Buday
- Production company: Délibáb Filmgyártó
- Release date: 18 September 1940
- Running time: 90 minutes
- Country: Hungary
- Language: Hungarian

On the Way Home (Hungarian: Hazafelé) is a 1940 Hungarian drama film directed by Arzén von Cserépy and starring Sári Fedák, Gyula Csortos and Ági Mészáros. It was shot at the Hunnia Studios in Budapest. The film's sets were designed by the art director Imre Sőrés.

== Synopsis ==
Lidi has been living in America for thirty years, supporting the education of her son János although she has been financially struggling. When she encounters him one day he doesn't even recognise her, to her disappointment. Discovering his mistake he follows her to Hungary, abandoning a potential wedding with a wealthy American woman, and meets Klári an attractive postal worker.

== Cast ==
- Sári Fedák as Lidi
- Gyula Csortos as Lőrinc, Lidi apja
- Ági Mészáros as Klári, postáskisasszony
- Lajos Hajmássy as János, Lidi fia
- Piroska Vaszary as Ila, Klári nővére
- Tivadar Bilicsi as Szakáll Menyhért, molnár
- Vali Rácz as Dorothea
- Ferenc Pethes as Miska
- Marcsa Simon as Sánta felesége
- József Pataky as Sánta Pál Péter
- Margit Selmeczy as Dorothea barátnője
- Margit Vándory as Panna, cseléd Kláriéknál
- Jenő Danis as Csontos úr
- Ervin Váczi as Falubeli
- Gyula Zordon as Falubeli
- Erzsébet Cserba as Falusi lány
- György Ungváry as Peti
- Zoltán Sugár as Jóska

== Bibliography ==
- Juhász, István. Kincses magyar filmtár 1931-1944: az eredeti forgatókönyvből 1931 és 1944 között létrejött hazai mozgóképekről. Kráter, 2007.
- Rîpeanu, Bujor. (ed.) International Directory of Cinematographers, Set- and Costume Designers in Film: Hungary (from the beginnings to 1988). Saur, 1981.
