= The Five-Forty =

1939 film

- Directed by: Andre de Toth
- Written by: József Babay; Jenõ Szatmári
- Produced by: Antal Takács
- Starring: Maria von Tasnady; Margit Makay; Ferenc Kiss
- Cinematography: István Eiben
- Edited by: Viktor Bánky
- Music by: Szabolcs Fényes
- Production companies: Hunnia Filmgyár; Takács Film
- Release date: 12 September 1939
- Running time: 85 minutes
- Country: Hungary
- Language: Hungarian

The Five-Forty (Hungarian: Öt óra 40) is a 1939 Hungarian mystery thriller film directed by Andre de Toth and starring Maria von Tasnady, Margit Makay and Ferenc Kiss. It was shot at the Hunnia Studios in Budapest. The film's sets were designed by the art director Márton Vincze. It premiered at the Venice Film Festival.

== Synopsis ==
In Paris a judge Henry Tessier is investigating an appeal for divorce from Marion, whose fortune hunter husband Robert is estranged from her. When Robert is then suspected of murdering opera singer Eleonora Taccani, Marion comes to his defence, leading Henry to question her motives.

== Cast ==
- Maria von Tasnady as Marion
- Margit Makay as Eleonora Taccani
- Ferenc Kiss as Henry Tessier
- Tivadar Uray as Robert Petrovich
- Zoltán Greguss as Louis Melotti
- Miklós Hajmássy as Lapin, detektív
- Lajos Köpeczi Boócz as Maréchal, orvos
- Piri Peéry as Mrs.Morris
- Sándor Pethes as Ügyvéd
- Vali Rácz as Énekesnõ
- Piroska Vaszary as Duval,öltöztetõnõ
- Elemér Baló as Bírósági jegyzõ
- Lajos Bazsay as Írásszakértõ
- Géza Berczy as Pincér
- Ferenc Bókay as Inas
- Lenke Egyed as Melotti háziasszonya
- Mária Fogarasi as Germaine, Typist
- Aranka Gazdy as Szomszédasszony
- Valéria Hidvéghy as Paulette
- Ilona Kiszely as Louise, szobalány
- Gyula Koltai as Rendõr
- Gyula Kompóthy as Fõügyész
- Ilona Kökény as Szomszédasszony
- Gyula Köváry as Zálogos
- László Misoga as Bírósági szolga
- Lajos Sugár as Banktisztviselõ
- Ferenc Szabó as Rendõr
- Péter Szõts D. as Nyomozó
- Gusztáv Vándory as Ékszerész
- Géza Márky as Robert ismerõse a Canada bárban
- Ferenc Pataki as Rendõr

== Bibliography ==
- Juhász, István. Kincses magyar filmtár 1931-1944: az eredeti forgatókönyvből 1931 és 1944 között létrejött hazai mozgóképekről. Kráter, 2007.
- Petrucci, Antonio. Twenty Years of Cinema in Venice. International Exhibition of Cinematographic Art, 1952.
- Rîpeanu, Bujor. (ed.) International Directory of Cinematographers, Set- and Costume Designers in Film: Hungary (from the beginnings to 1988). Saur, 1981.
- Wakeman, John. World Film Directors: 1890-1945. H.W. Wilson, 1987.
