= Bence Uz =

1938 film

- Directed by: Jenő Csepreghy
- Written by: Attila Orbók
- Based on: Bence Uz by József Nyirö
- Produced by: László Kalmár; Miklós Szalontai Kiss
- Starring: Pál Jávor; Bella Bordy; László Szilassy
- Cinematography: István Eiben
- Music by: Zoltán Pongrácz
- Production companies: Hunnia Filmgyár; Mester Film
- Release date: 18 November 1938
- Running time: 73 minutes
- Country: Hungary
- Language: Hungarian

Bence Uz (Hungarian: Uz Bence) is a 1938 Hungarian comedy drama film directed by Jenő Csepreghy and starring Pál Jávor, Bella Bordy and László Szilassy. It was shot at the Hunnia Studios in Budapest. The film's sets were designed by the art director Béla Mátyus.

== Cast ==
- Pál Jávor as Uz Bence
- Bella Bordy as Julis
- László Szilassy as Bagyoni László
- Gerö Mály as Madaván, jegyzõ
- Zsóka Ölvedy as Leticia, Madaván lánya
- Tivadar Bilicsi as Lajos, vadász
- Lajos Gárday as Barza, inspektor
- Zoltán Greguss as Jonescu
- Sándor Tompa as Mózsi
- József Bihari as Marci bácsi
- Ilona Kiszely as Gizike
- Karola Zala as Bagyoniné
- György Gonda as Gazda
- Ferenc Hoykó as Székely legény
- István Dózsa as Örmény
- Elemér Baló as Asztalos
- József Barna as Pap
- György Hajnal as Orvos
- László Misoga as Emre gazda
- Ferenc Pataki as Falusi útkaparó munkás
- Zoltán Pethö as Vadásztársaság tagja

== Bibliography ==
- Judson, Pieter and M. Rozenblit, Marsha L. (ed). Constructing Nationalities in East Central Europe. Berghahn Books, 2005.
- Juhász, István. Kincses magyar filmtár 1931-1944: az eredeti forgatókönyvből 1931 és 1944 között létrejött hazai mozgóképekről. Kráter, 2007.
- Rîpeanu, Bujor. (ed.) International Directory of Cinematographers, Set- and Costume Designers in Film: Hungary (from the beginnings to 1988). Saur, 1981.
