= István György (director) =

Hungarian film director

- Born: 29 November 1899; Budapest, Austria-Hungary
- Died: 14 April 1958 (aged 58); Budapest, Hungary
- Occupations: Director, editor, writer
- Years active: 1922–1943 (film)

István György (29 November 1899 – 14 April 1958) was a Hungarian screenwriter, film editor and film director. Politically he was associated with right-wing nationalism. He began his career in the silent era. Like many filmmakers he made no films after the fall of the Horthy regime and the subsequent establishment of Communist Hungary.

== Selected filmography ==
- Kiss Me, Darling (1932)
- It Happened in March (1934)
- The Empress and the Hussar (1935)
- The Students of Igló (1935)
- Family Bonus (1937)
- Gábor Göre Returns (1940)
- Yellow Rose (1941)
- Sister Beáta (1941)
- The Night Girl (1943)

== Bibliography ==
- Cunningham, John. Hungarian Cinema: From Coffee House to Multiplex. Wallflower Press, 2004.
- Hames, Peter. The Cinema Of Central Europe. Wallflower Press, 2004.
- Khatib, Lina H. Storytelling in World Cinemas, Volume 1. Columbia University Press, 2012.
