= Gábor Göre Returns =

1940 film

- Directed by: István György
- Written by: István György
- Based on: Gábor Göre Returns by Géza Gárdonyi
- Produced by: Benedek Baja
- Starring: Sándor Tompa; Sándor Pethes; László Misoga
- Cinematography: Károly Vass
- Edited by: Zoltán Farkas
- Music by: Lajos Ákom
- Production company: Szivárvány Film
- Release date: 13 March 1940
- Running time: 94 minutes
- Country: Hungary
- Language: Hungarian

Gábor Göre Returns (Hungarian: Göre Gábor visszatér) is a 1940 Hungarian comedy film directed by István György and starring Sándor Tompa, Sándor Pethes and László Misoga. The film's sets were designed by the art director Benedek Baja.

== Cast ==
- Sándor Tompa as Göre Gábor
- Sándor Pethes as Durbints sógor
- László Misoga as Kátsa cigány
- Kálmán Rózsahegyi as Füssi bíró
- Éva Adorján as Marcsa, Fejesék lánya
- Lili Sopronyi as Fejesné
- Ilona Dajbukát as Göréné
- Marcsa Simon as Magyariné
- Lajos Köpeczi Boócz as Fejes szomszéd
- Endre Markovits as Andris, Magyariék fia
- István Szegedi Szabó as Magyari szomszéd
- Ferenc Pethes as Kisbíró
- Zoltán Szakáts as Lepéndi tisztelendõ
- Lajos Boray as A báró
- Domokos Sala as Tiszteletes
- János Balassa as Filmrendezõ
- Rezsõ Acsay as Cigány
- Ferenc Pataki as Gazda
- Lajos Sugár as Fõlakáj
- Gyula Szöreghy as Fürdõmester
- Károly Vass as Operatõr
- Gusztáv Vándory as Bolti eladó

== Bibliography ==
- Hames, Peter (ed.) The Cinema of Central Europe. Wallflower Press, 2004.
- Juhász, István. Kincses magyar filmtár 1931-1944: az eredeti forgatókönyvből 1931 és 1944 között létrejött hazai mozgóképekről. Kráter, 2007.
- Rîpeanu, Bujor. (ed.) International Directory of Cinematographers, Set- and Costume Designers in Film: Hungary (from the beginnings to 1988). Saur, 1981.
