= Deadly Kiss =

1942 film

- Directed by: László Kalmár
- Written by: László Kalmár; Júlianna Zsigray
- Produced by: Antal Takács
- Starring: Katalin Karády; István Nagy; Gábor Rajnay
- Cinematography: István Eiben
- Edited by: Zoltán Kerényi
- Music by: Károly De Fries
- Production company: Takács Film
- Release date: 15 October 1942
- Running time: 99 minutes
- Country: Hungary
- Language: Hungarian

Deadly Kiss (Hungarian: Halálos csók) is a 1942 Hungarian romantic drama film directed by László Kalmár and starring Katalin Karády, István Nagy and Gábor Rajnay. It was shot at the Hunnia Studios in Budapest. The film's sets were designed by the art director Ferenc Daday.

== Cast ==
- Katalin Karády as Balásfy Ágnes / Balásfy Eszter
- István Nagy as Dr. Kemenes László, neurologist
- Gábor Rajnay as Mr Balásfy Kristóf
- László Perényi as Prince Giulio Pietro Sarelli
- Jenő Pataky as Niccolo, lute player
- Zoltán Greguss as Cesare, painter
- Artúr Somlay as Mr Gergely úr, head butler
- Ferenc Pethes as János, manservant
- Ila Nagy as Juci, maid
- Marcsa Simon as Cook
- József Juhász as Várady Gusztáv, painter
- Géza Berczy as Iván, motor racer
- Elemér Baló as Orlando, poison dealer
- Dezső Somkuthy as Orvos

== Bibliography ==
- Juhász, István. Kincses magyar filmtár 1931-1944: az eredeti forgatókönyvből 1931 és 1944 között létrejött hazai mozgóképekről. Kráter, 2007.
- Rîpeanu, Bujor. (ed.) International Directory of Cinematographers, Set- and Costume Designers in Film: Hungary (from the beginnings to 1988). Saur, 1981.
- Somlyódy, László & Somlyódy, Nóra. Hungarian Arts and Sciences: 1848-2000. Social Science Monographs, 2003.
- Taylor, Richard (ed.) The BFI companion to Eastern European and Russian cinema. British Film Institute, 2000.
