= Valerie Delacorte =

Hungarian actress (1914–2011)

Valéria Hidvéghy
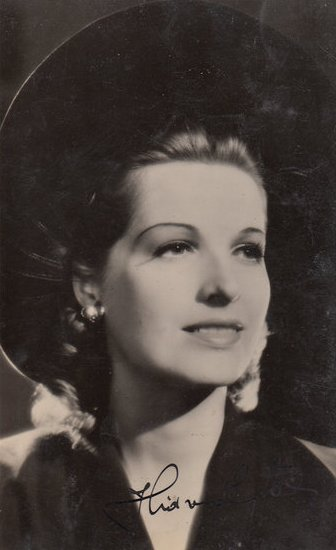
- Hidvéghy in 1942
- Born: 4 June 1914; Budapest, Austria-Hungary
- Died: 14 July 2011 (aged 97); Palm Beach Gardens, Florida, U.S.
- Occupation: Actress
- Years active: 1937–1944
- Spouse(s): Gabriel Pascal (m. 1947–1954); George T. Delacorte Jr. (m. ?–1991)

Valéria Hidvéghy or Valerie Pascal Delacorte (14 June 1914 – 14 July 2011) was a Hungarian actress.

== Life ==
Delacorte was born in Budapest and broke through the iron curtain to marry the film producer Gabriel Pascal. She is best known today for her 1970 memoir of him, The Disciple and His Devil: Gabriel Pascal and Bernard Shaw. In a letter to the editor of The New York Times in 1995 she wrote that the character of Eliza in the guise of a Magyar princess in "My Fair Lady" was due to her first husband.

After Pascal's death she married George T. Delacorte, Jr. in 1959 and together with him became a philanthropist as well as safeguarding Pascal's correspondence and legacy. She outlived this second husband as well and in 1991 three years after his death, made her first donation of $1 million and five Old Master paintings to the Norton Museum of Art. In total she donated 60 paintings to the museum.

Delacorte died at her home in Palm Beach Gardens.

== Selected filmography ==
- The Borrowed Castle (1937)
- A Girl Sets Out (1937)
- Tokay Rhapsody (1937)
- Marika (1938)
- Barbara in America (1938)
- Rézi Friday (1938)
- Magda Expelled (1938)
- The Henpecked Husband (1938)
- Black Diamonds (1938)
- Hello, Peter! (1939)
- The Five-Forty (1939)
- Princess of the Puszta (1939)
- The Bercsenyi Hussars (1940)
- The Last of the Vereczkeys (1940)
- Castle in Transylvania (1940)
- The Unquiet Night (1940)
- András (1941)
- Let's Love Each Other (1941)
- Taken by the Flood (1941)
- Flames (1941)
- Changing the Guard (1942)
- Cadet Love (1942)
- Sabotage (1942)
- African Bride (1944)
