= Half a Boy =

1944 film

- Directed by: Dezső Ákos Hamza
- Written by: József Kerekesházy; Kálmán Mikszáth
- Produced by: Pál Siklóssy
- Starring: Lajos Rajczy; Margit Ladomerszky; Gyula Benkö
- Cinematography: Árpád Makay
- Edited by: Mária Vály
- Music by: Olivér Pálmás
- Production company: Pax Film
- Release date: 1944
- Running time: 88 minutes
- Country: Hungary
- Language: Hungarian

Half a Boy (Hungarian: Egy fiúnak a fele) is a 1944 Hungarian comedy film directed by Dezső Ákos Hamza and starring Lajos Rajczy, Margit Ladomerszky and Gyula Benkö. It was shot at the Hunnia Studios in Budapest. The film's sets were designed by the art director Imre Sörés.

== Cast ==
- Lajos Rajczy as Gáthy
- Margit Ladomerszky as Gáthyné
- Gyula Benkö as Gáthy István
- György Gozmány as Gáthy János
- Ernö Mihályi as Vida
- Éva Kelemen as Vida Annus
- Katalin Ilosvay as Lujza
- Klára Pápai as Lujza anyja
- Rezsö Harsányi as Dr. Gergely
- István Szegedi Szabó as A barát
- Sándor Hidassy as Marci
- Zsóka Ölvedy as Julis
- Lajos Bazsay as Vidáék inasa
- Lucy Cziráky as Tanárnö a leánynevelö intézetben
- Jenö Danis as tiszttartó Lujzáék birtokán
- István Falussy as Dékán

== Bibliography ==
- Juhász, István. Kincses magyar filmtár 1931-1944: az eredeti forgatókönyvből 1931 és 1944 között létrejött hazai mozgóképekről. Kráter, 2007.
- Rîpeanu, Bujor. (ed.) International Directory of Cinematographers, Set- and Costume Designers in Film: Hungary (from the beginnings to 1988). Saur, 1981.
- Veress, József. A Magyar film története. Anno Kiadó, 2006
