= Closed Court =

1940 film

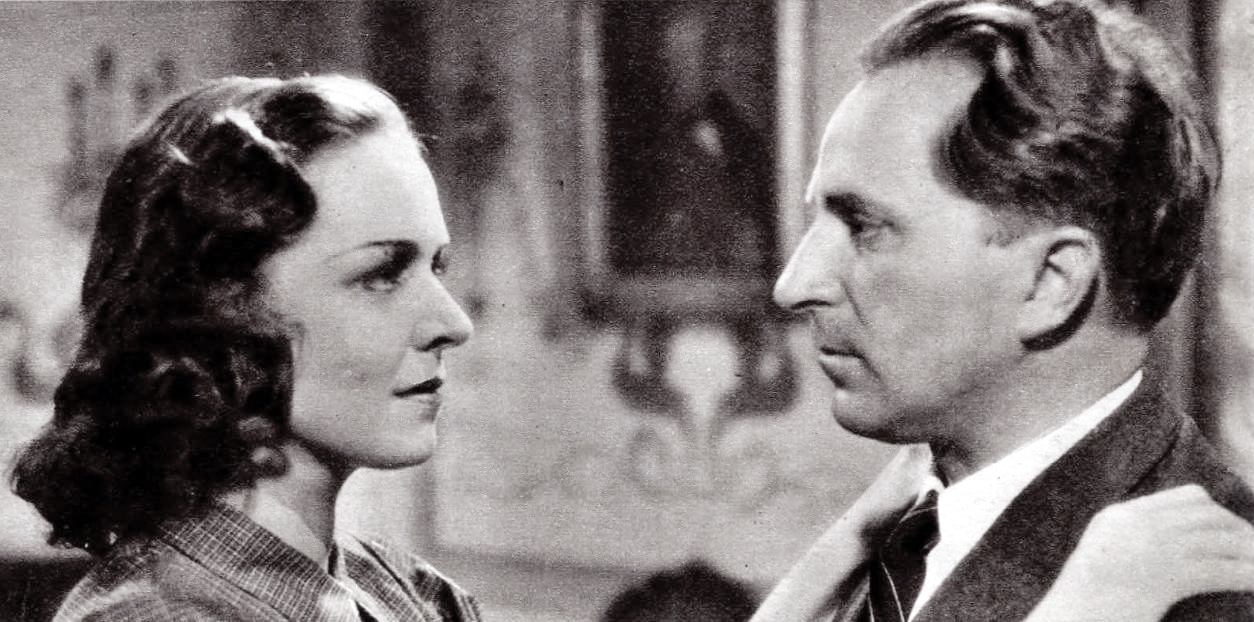
- Maria von Tasnady and Antal Páger.
- Directed by: Géza von Radványi
- Written by: Géza von Radványi
- Produced by: István Szentpály
- Starring: Maria von Tasnady; Antal Páger; Artúr Somlay
- Cinematography: Rudolf Icsey
- Edited by: László Katonka
- Music by: Szabolcs Fényes; Zoltán Kodály
- Production company: Atelier Film
- Distributed by: Titanus (Italy)
- Release date: 21 November 1940
- Running time: 92 minutes
- Country: Hungary
- Language: Hungarian

Closed Court (Hungarian: Zárt tárgyalás) is a 1940 Hungarian drama film directed by Géza von Radványi and starring Maria von Tasnady, Antal Páger and Artúr Somlay. It was shot at the Hunnia Studios in Budapest. The film's sets were designed by the art director János Horváth.

== Cast ==
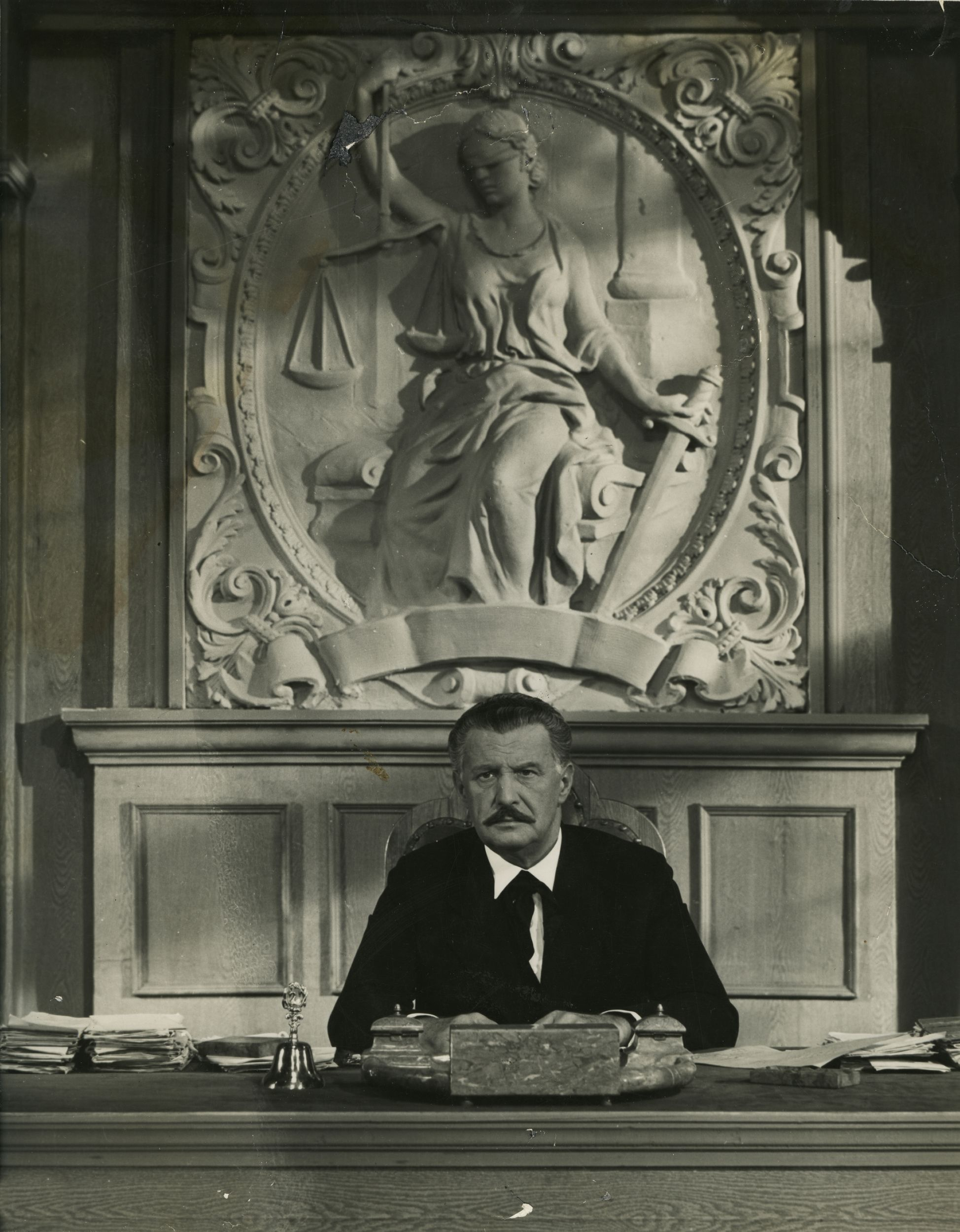
Artúr Somlay.

- Maria von Tasnady as Anna, Benedek felesége
- Antal Páger as Dr. Benedek Gábor ügyvéd
- József Timár as Szentgyörgyi Péter
- Artúr Somlay as Tibor ügyész
- Piroska Vaszary as Trafikosné
- Kálmán Rózsahegyi as Doktor
- József Bihari as Ács, gyilkosság vádlottja
- József Juhász as Szilárdka
- Margit Vágóné as Szentgyörgyiné
- Béla Mihályffi as Bíró
- Gizi Lengyel as Vendéghölgy
- Sándor Naszódy as Janika
- Ilonka Szép as Vendéghölgy
- Tihamér Lázár as Vizsgálóbíró
- Emmi Nagy as Dr. Benedek szobalánya
- Nándor Bihary as Impresszárió
- Ferenc Pethes as Fényképész
- Béla Fáy as tanú Ács tárgyalásán
- Anni Eisen as Statiszta a hangversenyen
- Menyhért Gulyás as Vendég
- Dezsö Szalóky as írnok
- Gyula Zordon as Szentgyörgyi soförje

== Bibliography ==
- Juhász, István. Kincses magyar filmtár 1931-1944: az eredeti forgatókönyvből 1931 és 1944 között létrejött hazai mozgóképekről. Kráter, 2007.
- Ostrowska, Dorota, Pitassio, Francesco & Varga, Zsuzsanna. Popular Cinemas in East Central Europe: Film Cultures and Histories. Bloomsbury Publishing, 2017
- Rîpeanu, Bujor. (ed.) International Directory of Cinematographers, Set- and Costume Designers in Film: Hungary (from the beginnings to 1988). Saur, 1981.
