= The Night Girl =

1943 film

- Directed by: Frigyes Bán
- Written by: Pál Barabás
- Produced by: Antal Güttler
- Starring: Lili Muráti; Andor Ajtay; Vali Rácz
- Cinematography: Barnabás Hegyi
- Edited by: István György
- Music by: Károly De Fries
- Production company: Palatinus Filmterjesztõ Vállalat
- Release date: 16 March 1943
- Running time: 77 minutes
- Country: Hungary
- Language: Hungarian

The Night Girl or The Girl of the Night (Hungarian: Az éjszaka lánya) is a 1943 Hungarian drama film directed by Frigyes Bán and starring Lili Muráti, Andor Ajtay and Vali Rácz. It was shot at the Hunnia Studios in Budapest. The film's sets were designed by the art directors János Horváth and Sándor Iliszi.

== Cast ==
- Lili Muráti as Kócos Bözsi / Ádám Erzsébet
- Andor Ajtay as Dr.Horváth Bálint
- László Perényi as Péter Ákos, festõ
- Zoltán Greguss as Jani - Bözsi szerelme
- Vali Rácz as Emmi
- Ilonka Szép as Sári
- Endre C. Turáni as Misu
- Gyula Köváry as Sanyi
- Ferenc Pethes as Maxi
- Lajos Kelemen as Feri
- Mici Haraszti as Jánosiné, vendég
- Tibor Magyari as Lojzi, betörõ
- Ildikó Zilahy as Dr. Horváth Bálint szobalánya

== Bibliography ==
- Balski, Grzegorz. Directory of Eastern European Film-makers and Films 1945-1991. Flicks Books, 1992.
- Juhász, István. Kincses magyar filmtár 1931-1944: az eredeti forgatókönyvből 1931 és 1944 között létrejött hazai mozgóképekről. Kráter, 2007.
- Rîpeanu, Bujor. (ed.) International Directory of Cinematographers, Set- and Costume Designers in Film: Hungary (from the beginnings to 1988). Saur, 1981.
