= Sándor Tompa =

Hungarian actor

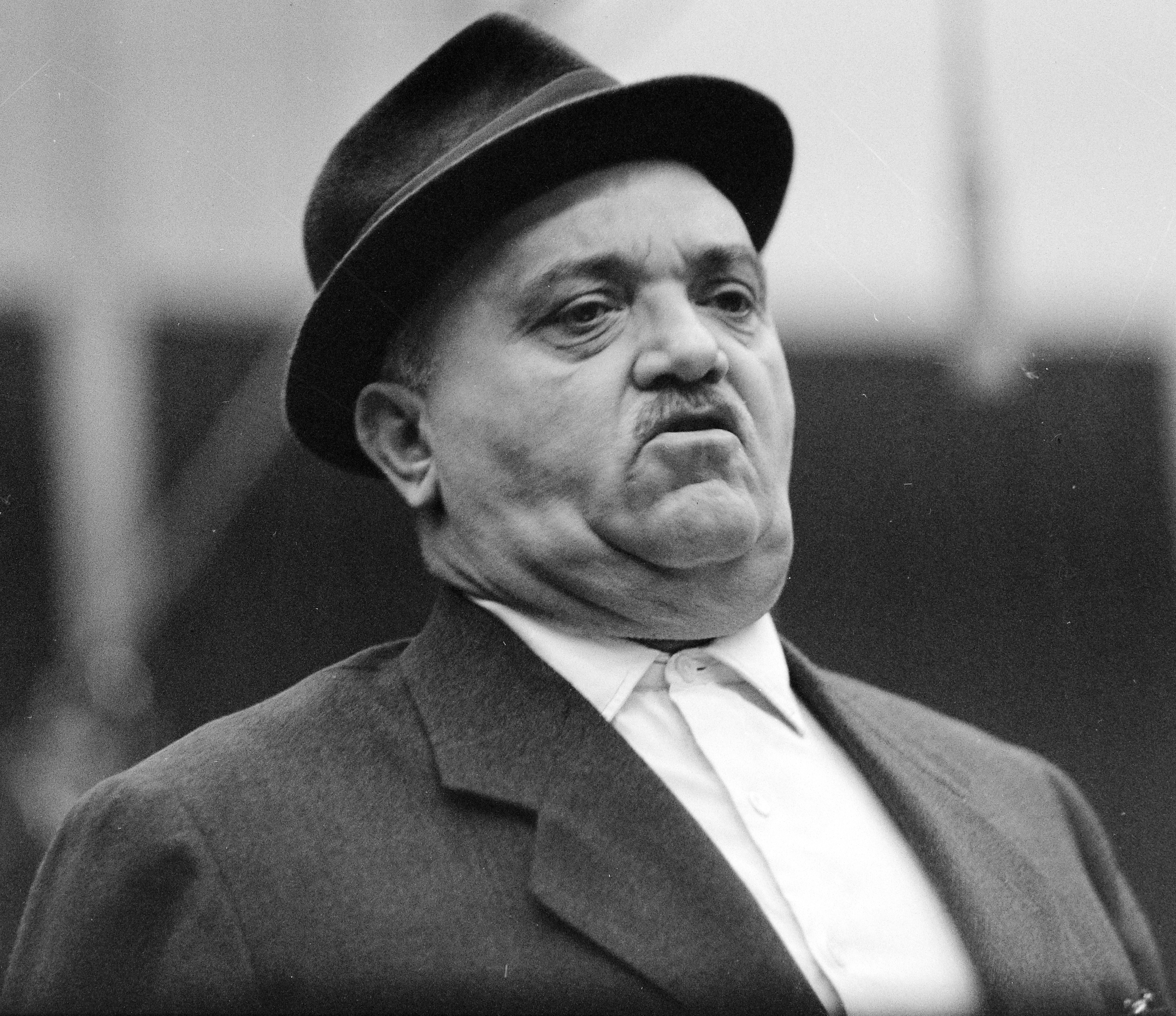
- Tompa in 1964
- Born: 22 December 1903; Kézdivásárhely, Austro-Hungarian Empire
- Died: 18 December 1969 (aged 65); Budapest, Hungary
- Occupation: Actor
- Years active: 1938–1969 (film)

Sándor Tompa (1903–1969) was a Hungarian film and stage actor. He was born in Transylvania, part of the Austro-Hungarian Empire which was ceded to Romania after the First World War and acted in the Hungarian language theatre in Cluj. In cinema he was a character actor, appearing often in supporting roles although he played the title character in the 1940 film Gábor Göre Returns.

== Selected filmography ==
- Bence Uz (1938)
- No Coincidence (1939)
- Six Weeks of Happiness (1939)
- Gábor Göre Returns (1940)
- Dankó Pista (1940)
- Duel for Nothing (1940)
- Unknown Opponent (1940)
- Silenced Bells (1941)
- The Marriage Market (1941)
- The Talking Robe (1942)
- Lóránd Fráter (1942)
- Mountain Girl (1942)
- The Song of Rákóczi (1943)
- A Lover of the Theatre (1944)
- Prophet of the Fields (1947)
- Singing Makes Life Beautiful (1950)
- A Strange Marriage (1951)
- The Land Is Ours (1951)
- Baptism of Fire (1952)
- Try and Win (1952)
- Under the City (1953)
- Young Hearts (1953)
- Kiskrajcár (1953)
- The First Swallows (1953)
- Liliomfi (1954)
- Dollar Daddy (1956)
- Leila and Gábor (1956)
- Dani (1957)
- Spiral Staircase (1957)
- A Husband for Susy (1960)
- I'll Go to the Minister (1962)
- Drama of the Lark (1963)
- The Moneymaker (1964)
- Háry János (1965)
- The Healing Water (1967)

== Bibliography ==
- Bíró, Sándor. The Nationalities Problem in Transylvania, 1867-1940: A Social History of the Romanian Minority Under Hungarian Rule, 1867-1918 and of the Hungarian Minority Under Romanian Rule, 1918-1940. Social Science Monographs, 1992.
- Laura, Ernesto G. Tutti i film di Venezia, 1932–1984. La Biennale, Settore cinema e spettacolo televisivo, 1985.
- Nemeskürty, István & Szántó, Tibor. A Pictorial Guide to the Hungarian Cinema, 1901-1984. Helikon, 1985.
