= Zoltán Greguss =

Hungarian actor

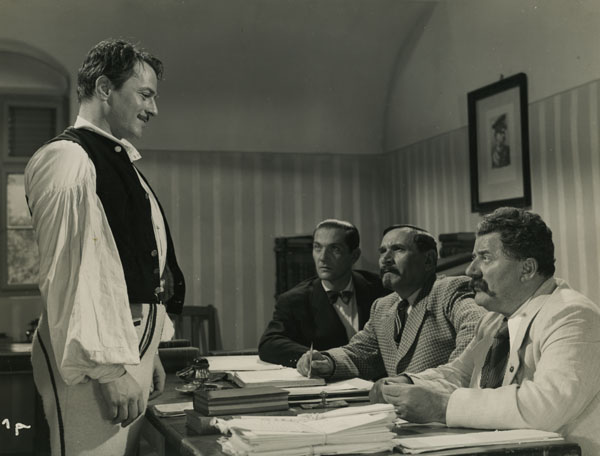
A scene from the movie Uz Bence. From the left: Pál Jávor, Zoltán Greguss, Lajos Gárday and Gerő Mály

Zoltán Greguss (May 10, 1904 – December 20, 1987) was a Hungarian film actor.

== Selected filmography ==
- My Daughter Is Different (1937) - Fekete Ferenc
- 300.000 pengö az utcán (1937) - Máté Egon
- The Village Rogue (1938) - Göndör Sándor
- Az örök titok (1938) - Kapitány
- Black Diamonds (1938) - Szaffrán Péter - Evila võlegénye
- Bence Uz (1938) - Jonescu
- Wildflowers of Gyimes (1939) - Fábián Gyula
- Between River and Steppe (1939) - Zigeuner
- Flower of the Tisza (1939) - Laci - cigánylegény
- The Five-Forty (1939) - Louis Melotti
- Zúgnak a szirénák (1939)
- Castle in Transylvania (1940) - Eszéky György báró
- Pénz beszél (1940)
- Mária két éjszakája (1940) - Chatell Iván
- Unknown Opponent (1940) - A 127-es kém
- Silenced Bells (1941) - Radescu
- Let's Love Each Other (1941) - Szitár Péter / Galáti Péter
- The Relative of His Excellency (1941) - Tihamér - Alíz bátya
- Europe Doesn't Answer (1941) - Olivera
- Yellow Rose (1941) - Lacza Ferkó
- Prince Bob (1941) - Félix - gárdakapitány
- Miért? (1941) - Szmokingos úr
- I Am Guilty (1942) - Frici, Lola barátja
- Costume Ball (1942) - Széky, festõmûvész
- Deadly Kiss (1942) - Cesare, a festõ
- Sirius (1942) - Osztrák
- Mountain Girl (1942) - Davarin, kocsislegény
- The Night Girl (1943) - Jani - Bözsi szerelme
- Ópiumkeringö (1943) - Petrovics Tibor, bankár
- Éjféli gyors (1943) - Finta János, fútõ
- Iva samodiva (1943) - Milionerat
- Lejtön (1944) - Armand Dernisse, pártvezér
- Sárga kaszinó (1944) - Várhegyi, a Gramofonlemez Vállalat igazgatója
- Masterless Woman (1944) - Kotovszky Iván
- The Land Is Ours (1951) - Kretz, földbirtokos
- Underground Colony (1951) - Forray
- Leila and Gábor (1956) - Ali pasa
- Professor Hannibal (1956) - Muray
- Tale on the Twelve Points (1957) - Péntek Lajos, KIK vezetõ
- Édes Anna (1958) - Tatár Gábor
- A megfelelö ember (1960) - Alvarez Gonzales
- Be True Until Death (1960) - Doroghy úr
- Puskák és galambok (1961)
- Megöltek egy lányt (1961)
- Áprilisi riadó (1962)
- The Man of Gold (1962) - Brazovics
- Drama of the Lark (1964) - Környei Bálint
- The Moneymaker (1964) - Fõkapitány
- Mit csinált Felséged 3-tól 5-ig? (1964) - Pápai követ
- A köszívü ember fiai (1965) - Magyar tiszt
- Sok hüség semmiért (1966) - Politikus
- Aranysárkány (1966) - Dr. Ebeczky - ügyvéd
- Sellö a pecsétgyürün I (1967) - Vöröskõy
- Sellö a pecsétgyürün II (1967) - Vöröskõy
- Three Nights of Love (1967) - Melitta férje
- Emma Hamilton (1968) - (uncredited)
- Utazás a koponyám körül (1970) - Sorbanálló
- Gyula vitéz télen-nyáron (1970) - Fõorvos
- Volt egyszer egy család (1972) - Khünrfeld gyáros
- Nápolyt látni és... (1973) - Kollár Rezsõ, igazgató
- Kojak Budapesten (1980) - Szalánczy

== Bibliography ==
- Cunningham, John. Hungarian Cinema: From Coffee House to Multiplex. Wallflower Press, 2004.
