= Barbara in America =

1938 film

- Directed by: Márton Keleti
- Written by: Tamás Emőd; Attila Orbók; Rezső Török
- Produced by: Ernő Gál
- Starring: Margit Dajka; Imre Hámory; Gerő Mály
- Cinematography: Károly Kurzmayer
- Edited by: Viktor Bánky
- Music by: Jenő Sándor
- Production company: Reflektor Film
- Release date: 16 August 1938
- Running time: 94 minutes
- Country: Hungary
- Language: Hungarian

Barbara in America (Hungarian: Borcsa Amerikában) is a 1938 Hungarian comedy film directed by Márton Keleti and starring Margit Dajka, Imre Hámory and Gerő Mály. The film's sets were designed by the art director József Pán.

== Cast ==
- Margit Dajka as Borcsa
- Imre Hámory as Szalai Pista
- Gerö Mály as Gyümölcs Zsiga - Borcsa nagybátyja
- Gyula Gózon as Faragó
- Sándor Góth as Amerikai menedzser
- Piroska Vaszary as Pista anyja
- Ferenc Galetta as Pista apja
- Zsóka Ölvedy as Rozál
- Marcsa Simon as Gubásné
- Lajos Köpeczi Boócz as Jegyzõ
- Árpád Latabár as Parkett táncos
- Manyi Kiss as Parkett táncos
- Lajos Ihász as Artista
- Zoltán Hirsch as Artista
- István Falussy as Artista
- Gyula Szöreghy as Kocsmáros
- Ferenc Pethes as Andris
- Gyula Tapolczay as Cigányprímás
- József Berky as Muzsikus cigány
- Sándor Pethes as Frankovics - angoltanár
- Valéria Hidvéghy as Szobalány a hajón
- Attila Petheö as Magyar úr a hajón
- Károly Kovács as A magyar úr fia
- Béla Fáy as Hajógépész
- Géza Berczy as Amerikai színész
- György Kürthy as Amerikai színházigazgató
- Miklós Hajmássy as Tüzoltó
- György Ungváry as Parasztfiú

== Bibliography ==
- Cunningham, John. Hungarian Cinema: From Coffee House to Multiplex. Wallflower Press, 2004.
- Juhász, István. Kincses magyar filmtár 1931-1944: az eredeti forgatókönyvből 1931 és 1944 között létrejött hazai mozgóképekről. Kráter, 2007.
- Rîpeanu, Bujor. (ed.) International Directory of Cinematographers, Set- and Costume Designers in Film: Hungary (from the beginnings to 1988). Saur, 1981.
