= Silenced Bells =

1941 film

- Directed by: László Kalmár
- Written by: Sándor Hunyady
- Based on: Silenced Bells by Viktor Rákosi
- Produced by: Mária Hausz
- Starring: Margit Lukács; Ferenc Kiss; István Nagy
- Cinematography: István Eiben
- Edited by: Zoltán Kerényi
- Music by: Szabolcs Fényes
- Production company: Hausz Mária Filmkölcsönzõ
- Release date: 27 February 1941
- Running time: 97 minutes
- Country: Hungary
- Language: Hungarian

Silenced Bells (Hungarian: Elnémult harangok) is a 1941 Hungarian drama film directed by László Kalmár and starring Margit Lukács, Ferenc Kiss and István Nagy. It was shot at the Hunnia Studios in Budapest. The film's sets were designed by the art director Imre Sörés. It is based on a novel of the same title by Viktor Rákosi, which had previously been adapted into 1916 and 1922 silent versions.

== Cast ==
- Margit Lukács as Florica
- Ferenc Kiss as Todorescu
- István Nagy as Simándy Pál református lelkész
- Géza Berczy as Fõispáni államtitkár
- Nándor Bihary as Cigányprímás
- László Földényi as Orosz gróf
- Zoltán Greguss as Radescu
- Lajos Gárday as Pásztor
- János Görbe as Pásztor
- Gyula id. Szabó as Kocsmáros
- József Juhász as Pásztor
- Lajos Kelemen as Pásztor
- Mária Keresztessy as Todorescu felesége
- Árpád Lehotay as Fõispán
- László Misoga as Pásztor
- Domokos Sala as Pásztor
- Marcsa Simon as Sári néni
- Lajos Sugár as Angol újságíró
- Dezsö Szalóky as öreg parasztember
- Gyula Szöreghy as Vendég a kolozsvári fogadóban
- Kató Timár as Todorescuék cselédje
- Sándor Tompa as Kurátor
- Gusztáv Vándory as Református püspök

== Bibliography ==
- Judson, Pieter and M. Rozenblit, Marsha L. (ed). Constructing Nationalities in East Central Europe. Berghahn Books, 2005.
- Juhász, István. Kincses magyar filmtár 1931-1944: az eredeti forgatókönyvből 1931 és 1944 között létrejött hazai mozgóképekről. Kráter, 2007.
- Rîpeanu, Bujor. (ed.) International Directory of Cinematographers, Set- and Costume Designers in Film: Hungary (from the beginnings to 1988). Saur, 1981.
