= Two Girls on the Street =

1939 film by André de Toth

- Hungarian: Két lány az utcán
- Directed by: André de Toth
- Written by: André de Toth; Tamás Emöd; Rezsö Török
- Produced by: Béla Lévay
- Starring: Bella Bordy; Maria von Tasnady; Piri Vaszary
- Cinematography: Károly Vass
- Edited by: Zoltán Kerényi
- Music by: Szabolcs Fényes
- Production companies: Hunnia Film Studio; Photophon Film Kft.
- Release dates: 4 October 1939 (Hungary); 18 May 2010 (Cannes)
- Running time: 79 minutes
- Country: Hungary
- Language: Hungarian

Two Girls on the Street (Hungarian: Két lány az utcán) is a 1939 Hungarian comedy drama film directed by André de Toth, one of his first features, based on a play by Tamás Emöd and Rezsö Török.

== Plot ==
Two young women, a musician and a bricklayer, navigate their careers, friendships, and love lives in Budapest after running away from their home village.

== Cast ==
- Bella Bordy as Vica Torma
- Maria von Tasnady as Gyöngyi Kártély
- Piri Vaszary as Pletyus
- Gyula Csortos as Filc
- Andor Ajtay as Csiszár István
- Károly Kovács as Lali
- György Dénes as Võlegény
- László Földényi as Gyöngyi's father
- Piri Ádám as Band member
- Vali Rátz as Manci

== Restoration ==
Two Girls on the Street was selected for preservation by the World Cinema Project; the print was restored by Cinémathèque de Bologne and Immagine Ritrovata. The restoration premiered at the 2010 Cannes Film Festival. In 2022, this restoration was released as part of Martin Scorsese's World Cinema Project Vol. 4 alongside the 1948 Uday Shankar film Kalpana as spine 1147 in The Criterion Collection.
