= Szabolcs Fényes =

Hungarian composer

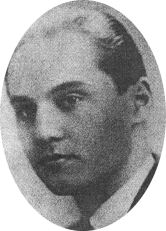
- Born: 30 April 1912; Nagyvárad, Hungary
- Died: 12 October 1986 (aged 74); Budapest, Hungary
- Occupation: Composer
- Spouse: Rózsi Csikós

Szabolcs Fényes (30 April 1912 – 12 October 1986) was a Hungarian composer of film scores. He was married to the actress Rózsi Csikós.

== Selected filmography ==
- Romance of Ida (1934)
- Emmy (1934)
- Hello, Budapest! (1935)
- Address Unknown (1935)
- A Girl Sets Out (1937)
- Sister Maria (1937)
- Premiere (1937)
- Young Noszty and Mary Toth (1938)
- Istvan Bors (1939)
- Six Weeks of Happiness (1939)
- Wedding in Toprin (1939)
- The Five-Forty (1939)
- Mickey Magnate (1939)
- Castle in Transylvania (1940)
- Closed Court (1940)
- Everybody Loves Someone Else (1940)
- Gül Baba (1940)
- Mirage by the Lake (1940)
- Sarajevo (1940)
- One Night in Transylvania (1941)
- Silenced Bells (1941)
- Three Bells (1941)
- Prince Bob (1941)
- The Relative of His Excellency (1941)
- Flames (1941)
- Left-Handed Angel (1941)
- Europe Doesn't Answer (1941)
- Temptation (1942)
- A Woman Looks Back (1942)
- I Am Guilty (1942)
- We'll Know By Midnight (1942)
- Time of Trial (1942)
- Katyi (1942)
- The White Train (1943)
- Masterless Woman (1944)
- Without Lies (1946)
- The Marriage of Katalin Kis (1950)
- Try and Win (1952)
- The First Swallows (1953)
- Dollar Daddy (1956)
- Tale on the Twelve Points (1957)
- A Quiet Home (1958)
- A Game with Love (1959)
- Sunshine on the Ice (1961)
- The Moneymaker (1964)
- Lady-Killer in Trouble (1964)
- The Witness (1969)

== Bibliography ==
- Bingham, Adam. Directory of World Cinema: East Europe. Intellect Books, 2011.
