= Istvan Bors =

1939 film

- Directed by: Viktor Bánky
- Written by: Sándor Hunyady (play); Endre Rodríguez
- Produced by: Endre Rodríguez
- Starring: Antal Páger; József Bihari; Klári Tolnay
- Cinematography: Rudolf Icsey
- Music by: Szabolcs Fényes
- Production companies: Atelier Film; Magyar Film Iroda
- Release date: 23 February 1939
- Running time: 99 minutes
- Country: Hungary
- Language: Hungarian

Istvan Bors (Hungarian: Bors István) is a 1939 Hungarian comedy film directed by Viktor Bánky and starring Antal Páger, József Bihari and Klári Tolnay. It is based on a 1938 play by Sándor Hunyady, and was screened at the Venice Film Festival. It was shot at the Hunnia Studios in Budapest. The film's sets were designed by the art directors József Pán and József Simoncsics.The following year it was remade as an Italian film Big Shoes starring Amedeo Nazzari.

== Main cast ==
- Antal Páger as Bors István
- József Bihari as János
- Klári Tolnay as Ilonka
- László Dévényi as Parasztfiú
- László Földényi as Ügyvéd
- Margit Ladomerszky as Kálmán felesége
- Béla Mihályffi as Tulogdy Kálmán
- Ferenc Pethes as Prakszi
- Sándor Pethes as Ügyvédbojtár
- Lajos Boray as Tiszttartó
- Endre C. Turáni as Paraszt
- Olga Eszenyi as Kati
- Béla Fáy as Võlegény

== Bibliography ==
- Judson Rozenblit. Constructing Nationalities in East Central Europe. Berghahn Books, 2005.
