= Ilona Náday =

Hungarian singer and actress

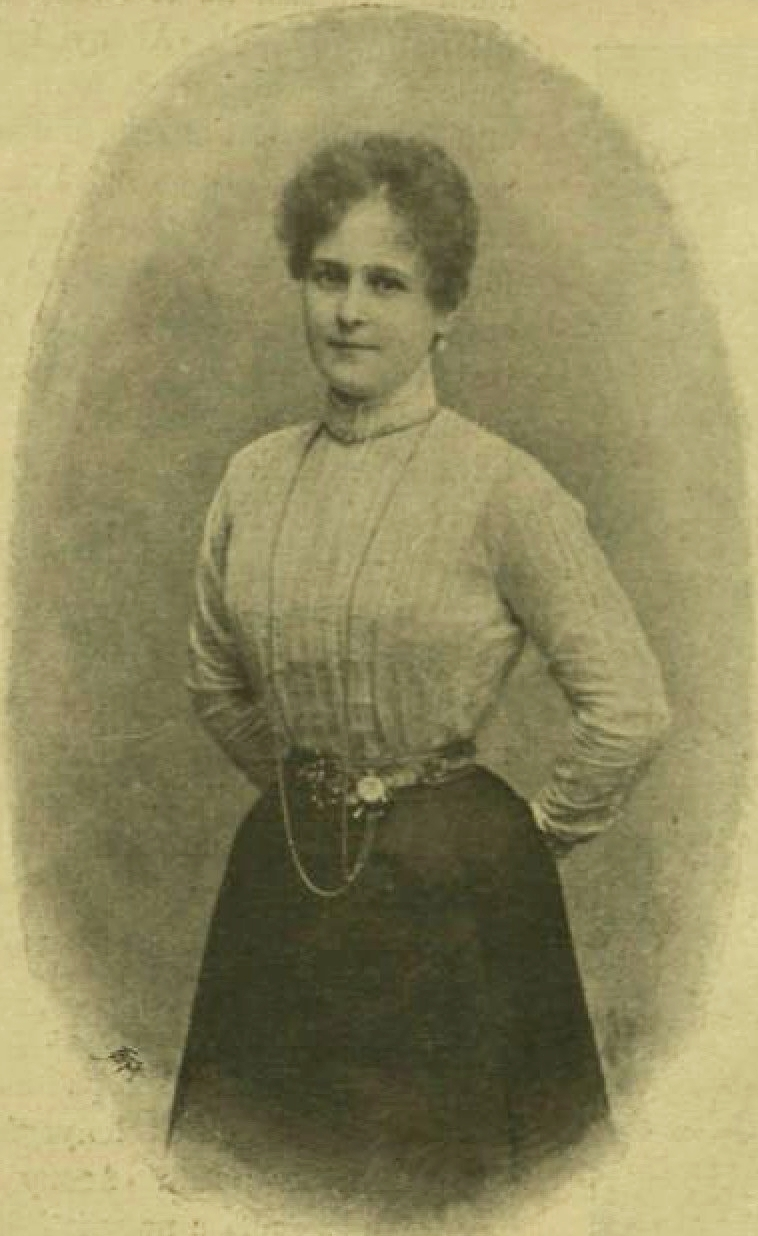
- Náday in 1900
- Born: Ilona Katalin Etelka Náday; 4 August 1874; Budapest, Austria-Hungary
- Died: 20 October 1949 (aged 75); Budapest, Hungary
- Occupations: Actress; singer
- Spouse(s): Manó Kálmán László Jeszenszky de Kisjeszen et Megyefalva (his death); Iván Jeszenszky de Kisjeszen et Megyefalva (divorced)
- Children: 2 or 3

Ilona Katalin Etelka Náday (4 August 1874 – 20 October 1949) was a Hungarian singer and actress who found her initial success in Austria before returning to sing in Budapest.

== Biography ==
The daughter of Ferenc Náday and Katalin Vidmár, Ilona Náday debuted in 1897 at the People's Theater, in the operetta of József Márkus's operetta, Kuktakiswoman. In October 1899, she joined troupe of the An der Wien Theater in Vienna for three years. She had German voice coaches. By 1900, her success in Vienna was being reported noting that she had appeared over 100 times in that year. She was compared with her mother who had also found success there years before in Austria.

She stopped appearing at the theatre after she married Manó Kálmán László Jeszenszky de Kisjeszen et Megyefalva, but she returned to sing solos after her children were born. In 1917, she joined National Theatre in Budapest where, in 1921, she played the role of Gizi Bajor in Sándor Balázs's The Masks. Her husband had died in 1915; she married his younger brother, Iván, but they divorced in 1919. She retired in 1935, and died of cancer in 1949, aged 75.
