= Bella Bordy =

Hungarian actress (1909–1978)

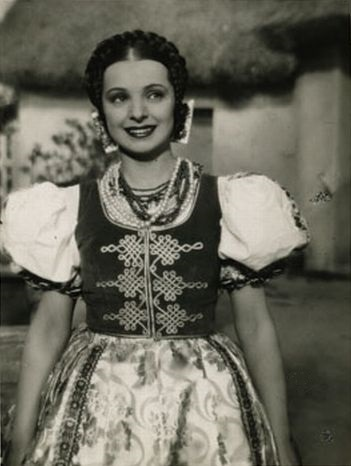
- Bordy in The Red Wallet (1938)
- Born: 21 November 1909; Gyula, Austro-Hungarian Empire
- Died: 28 June 1978 (aged 68); Budapest, Hungary
- Occupations: Dancer; actress
- Years active: 1938–1962 (film)

Bella Bordy (21 November 1909 – 28 June 1978) was a Hungarian ballet dancer and film actress. She was a star of the Hungarian National Ballet and regularly appeared at the Hungarian State Opera House. From 1938 onwards she appeared in fifteen films, all but one of them during the Horthy era.

== Selected filmography ==
- The Red Wallet (1938)
- Bence Uz (1938)
- Two Girls on the Street (1939)
- Stars of Variety (1939)
- Cserebere (1940)
- András (1941)
- Loving Hearts (1944)

== Bibliography ==
- Fekete, Márton. Prominent Hungarians: Home and Abroad. Szepsi Csombor Literary Circle, 1979.
- Ujfalussy, József. Béla Bartók. Crescendo Publishing Company, 1972.
