= Rézi Friday =

1938 film

- Directed by: Ladislao Vajda
- Written by: Emil Martonffi; Rezső Török
- Produced by: Ferenc Pless
- Starring: Ida Turay; Mici Erdélyi; Antal Páger; Gábor Rajnay
- Cinematography: István Eiben
- Edited by: Zoltán Farkas
- Music by: Jenö Sándor
- Production company: Harmónia Film
- Release date: 30 September 1938
- Running time: 81 minutes
- Country: Hungary
- Language: Hungarian

Rézi Friday (Hungarian: Péntek Rézi) is a 1938 Hungarian comedy film directed by Ladislao Vajda and starring Ida Turay, Mici Erdélyi and Antal Páger. It was shot at the Hunnia Studios in Budapest. The film's sets were designed by art director Márton Vincze. The title refers to the name of its heroine, a resourceful orphan who falls in love with a doctor who works at her school. In 1941 the film was remade in Italy as Teresa Venerdì.

== Cast ==
- Ida Turay as Péntek Rézi
- Mici Erdélyi as Leleményi Piri, táncosnő
- Antal Páger as Dr. Gerleszegi Gerle Géza
- Gábor Rajnay as Zsámbéky Hugó
- Mariska Vízváry as Az árvaház igazgatónője
- Mária Egry as Zsámbéky lánya
- Vilma Medgyaszay as Zsámbékyné
- Gyula Gózon as Tóni, Gerle lakája
- József Juhász as Dr. Megyeri József
- Attila Petheö as Gerle apja
- Zsuzsa Simon as Dávid Paula
- Erzsi Orsolya as Árvaházi tanárnő
- Irén Sitkey as Árvaházi tanárnő
- Sándor Peti as Végrehajtó
- Hilda Gobbi as Doktornő
- Lajos Sugár as Végrehajtó
- Ferenc Pethes as Pincér
- Adrien Hollán
- Rózsi Tátrai
- Sári Sugár
- Kató Szabó
- Ilona Kiszely
- Éva Libertiny
- Valéria Hidvéghy
- Gyöngyi Váry
- Irma Lányi
- István Lontay
- Ferenc Galetta

== Bibliography ==
- Reich, Jacqueline & Garofalo, Piero. Re-viewing Fascism: Italian Cinema, 1922-1943. Indiana University Press, 2002.
