= István Mihály =

Hungarian screenwriter

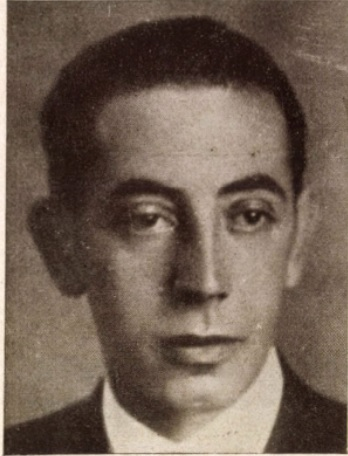
- Mihály in 1930.
- Born: 29 June 1892; Budapest, Austro-Hungarian Empire
- Died: 23 February 1945 (aged 62); Bruck an der Leitha, Austria
- Occupation: Screenwriter
- Years active: 1922–1944 (film)

István Mihály (1892–1945) was a Hungarian screenwriter and lyricist. He combined employment in the Hungarian film industry alongside work writing for cabarets. Mihály was born to a Jewish family in Budapest. He began working in the silent era, and directed a single film The Seventh Veil (1927). His career flourished in the 1930s following the introduction of sound film, but the Anti-Jewish laws enacted by the Horthy regime forced him to work using an alias during the 1940s. In 1944 following the German invasion that brought the Nazi-backed Arrow Cross to power he was arrested due to his Jewish background and subject to forced labour. In a weakened condition he died in Bruck an der Leitha.

== Selected filmography ==
=== As director and writer ===
- The Seventh Veil (1927)

=== As writer only ===
- Flying Gold (1932)
- Miss Iza (1933)
- Judgment of Lake Balaton (1933)
- Emmy (1934)
- Cornflower (1934)
- Everything for the Woman (1934)
- Romance of Ida (1934)
- Purple Lilacs (1934)
- The Empress and the Hussar (1935)
- Family Bonus (1937)
- Help, I'm an Heiress (1937)
- Black Diamonds (1938)
- Number 111 (1938)
- The Henpecked Husband (1938)
- Wedding in Toprin (1939)
- Machita (1944)

== Bibliography ==
- Khatib, Lina H., Storytelling in World Cinemas, Volume 1. Columbia University Press, 2012.
- Juhász, István, Kincses magyar filmtár 1931–1944: az eredeti forgatókönyvből 1931 és 1944 között létrejött hazai mozgóképekről. Kráter, 2007.
