= Everything for the Woman =

1934 film

- Directed by: Béla Gaál; Géza von Cziffra
- Written by: Aladar Laszlo; István Mihály; Károly Nóti; László Vadnay; Géza von Cziffra
- Produced by: Ernő Gál
- Starring: Jenő Herczeg; Vilmos Komlós; Gyula Kabos
- Cinematography: István Eiben
- Edited by: György Feld
- Music by: Joe Hajos
- Production company: City Film
- Release date: 31 January 1934
- Running time: 85 minutes
- Country: Hungary
- Language: Hungarian

Everything for the Woman (Hungarian: Mindent a nőért!) is a 1934 Hungarian comedy film directed by Béla Gaál and Géza von Cziffra and starring Jenő Herczeg, Vilmos Komlós and Gyula Kabos.

== Cast ==
- Jenö Herczeg as Hacsek (segment Hacsek és Sajó mozikalandja)
- Vilmos Komlós as Sajó (segment Hacsek és Sajó mozikalandja)
- Gyula Kabos as Ladányi Ödön (segment Éjjel a patikában)
- Ella Gombaszögi as Ladányiné (segment Éjjel a patikában)
- Irén Ágay as Klárika, patikus kisasszony (segment Éjjel a patikában)
- Lajos Ihász as Klárika võlegénye (segment Éjjel a patikában)
- Ferenc Vendrey as Öreg beteg (segment Éjjel a patikában)
- Tibor Halmay as Pincér (segment Jaj de jó szeretni!)
- Lici Balla (segment Jaj de jó szeretni!)
- György Dénes (segment Jaj de jó szeretni!)
- Gyula Justh (segment Jaj de jó szeretni!)
- S.Z. Sakall (segment A pampák királya)
- Elma Bulla
- Gyula Gózon (segment Éjjel a patikában)
- Mici Haraszti (segment A pampák királya)
- László Keleti (segment A pampák királya)
- Livia Miklós
- Erzsi Palotai
- Sándor Pethes
- Sándor Peti (segment Éjjel a patikában)
- Ernõ Szenes segment A pampák királya)
- Lenke Szõnyi
- Gizi Sárosi
- Andor Sárossy
- Lajos Ujváry (segment Éjjel a patikában)

== Bibliography ==
- Ferenc Lohr. Hallom a filmet. Magvető, 1989.
