= Gyula Kabos =

Hungarian actor and comedian (1887–1941)

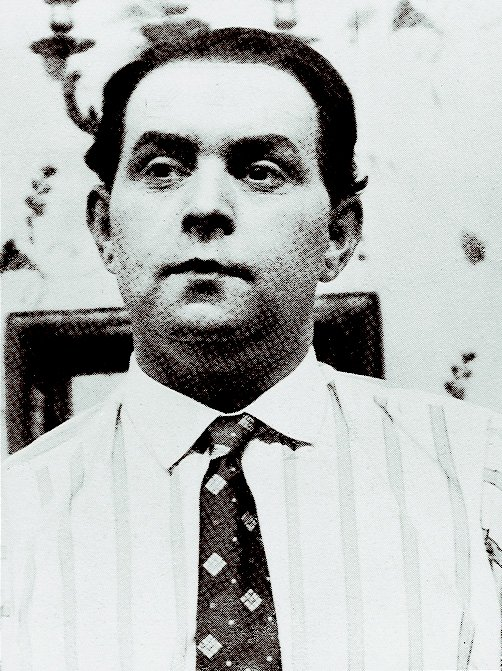
Gyula Kabos

Gyula Kabos (19 March 1887, Budapest – 6 October 1941, New York) was a Hungarian actor and comedian, widely known for his comedic movie roles in the late 1930s.

== Biography ==
=== Early years ===
Kabos was born into a Jewish family on 19 March 1887, in Budapest as Gyula Kann. After completing Elek Solymosi's acting school, he started acting in Szabadka (Subotica), where he worked until 1910 with a short interruption in 1906–07 when he lived in Zombor (Sombor). Szabadka granted him his first successes, his first successful forays into the world of theatre, and this is the town where he met his first great comedic partner, Gyula Gózon. Following his advice, he moved to Nagyvárad (Oradea) and lived there from 1910 to 1913. Later on, he remembered these years quite fondly. He was a well-known actor in town and had various comic adventures with his partner (which were released weekly in the town newspaper). He later moved to Budapest to play in different theatres, including the Király Színház, the Vígszínház, Pesti Kabaré, while trying, but ultimately failing to start an American-styled variety theatre in Nagyvárad (1919).

=== Career between 1919–1933 ===
In 1919 he married Mária Puhalag, and adopted her daughter, Gabriella Surányi. They moved to Budapest, where his son István György Kabos was born. As directors discover his comedic talent, he got more and more small roles, including one in the Vígszínház. While his appearances were met with high critical acclaim, the financial crisis of the country drew a shadow to the theatrical world, also reducing his appearances. However, this situation proved an opportunity, as the renowned Fővárosi Művész Színház (the future Operettszínház) closed its doors, and a new search began for a director. Along with László Békeffi, his name was trusted enough that they got the job. But life as a manager proved to be hard as Kabos disapproved the high salaries of leading actors, resulting in numerous conflicts. Again, the new plays were met with high critical acclaim, but not with monetary success, so the theatre needed to pull out formerly produced plays. Continuing work conflicts, the appearance of the first sound movies, and disinterest of the public eventually resulted in bankruptcy. While he already tried himself in numerous small, often experimental silent films during the 1910s, he disliked them, as he blamed them for the downfall of the theatrical world.

After numerous attempts, he played the role of "Mátyás Schneider" in the sound film, Hyppolit, a lakáj (Hyppolit, the Butler) in 1931. The movie became one of the first movie successes in Hungary, and along with its soundtrack, becoming one of the most-known cinematic work of the era. The success resulted in several other foreign-language movie roles. After a small detour in Vienna, trying to impress the Austrian public, he worked again in Budapest from 1932. As the Great Depression, and the more and more popular movies further decimated the Budapest theatre scene, his career struggled again in small, low-paying roles, overshadowed by the few remaining stars. As the Magyar Színház theatre offered him a few dramatic roles, he accepted them, and thereby returned in the front of larger audiences. After a few dramatic roles, he returned to his old light-hearted comedic character, to great success, also touring in Germany.

=== Comedian and movie star ===
Beginning with Márciusi Mese (A March tale) he began to enjoy making movies. After the 1934 premier of Meseautó (Dream Car), his other massive success, he was met with a standing ovation. The sudden fame surprised Kabos, as he did not understand why a movie star should be famous (until then he had only watched a few scenes from his own work). In his numerous later films, he played the tragicomical small man in the hard years of the 30s, motivated by fear to carry out foolish acts. While the public believed he became a rich movie star, Kabos's financial situation remained dire, as he needed to pay the debts of his theatrical failure, and had to support his poor family, who did not believe that he was much like them. Even as the best-known comedy star in Hungary, because of the creditors, he only got 10 Pengő from his original 60 Pengő/day payment (as comparison actress Sári Fedák got 540 Pengő/day). To earn a livelihood, he needed to make movie after movie, while also playing numerous theatres. His role in the Vígszínház act Lovagias Ügy was another great success, winning back his theatrical audience. By 1935, he became one of the most sought-after movie actors, as he could greatly adapt to the then-special process of shooting only one scene at a time. Notable movies of this era are Halló Budapest and Köszönöm, hogy elgázolt.

=== Final years in Hungary ===
In 1936 he completed the movie version of Lovagias ügy, which was the first to spark the opposition of the radical right-wing groups that had started a few years earlier. Protests shouting "Down with Jewish movies" were held in Budapest, Pécs, Baja, and many premieres were disrupted. As historians believe, the growing number of such revolts were orchestrated from Germany. Kabos slowly became the center point of attacks, a condition that filled him with fear and despair, not only for himself, but for his family. He buried himself in work, whenever possible. The third big success, A Noszty fiú esete Tóth Marival was followed by a massive right-wing press campaign against director István Székely, after which Székely left the country. Losing one of his main partners in movie-making, Kabos feared he could be next. With budgets decreasing, Kabos became more and more like a cornerstone of Hungarian filmmaking of the time, deciding the financial success or failure of the venture. In 1937 he left the Vígszínház theatre, to act in the Andrássy and Magyar theatres. These were the months of his last big achievements, as air-raid sirens, the first signs of the coming WWII were disrupting the work more and more often. In spring 1938 he started to plan his escape. With the help of his old friend Alexander Korda, he sends his son István to England to university. After playing in three light comedies, his 33-year theatrical career in Budapest came to a close. While he still continued to make movies, including his first real leading role in Papucshős, the first anti-Jew laws made his work slowly impossible. In 1939, newspapers began to spread rumors that Kabos was travelling to America. With his wife at his side, and in deep depression, he left the country in the compartment of a train leaving from the Keleti train station. Through Ostend and Dover they traveled to London, where they meet their son István. On 1. February 1939, aboard the vessel Paris, they sailed towards America, to a future Kabos was uncertain about.

=== Life in America ===
The pair moved into the Woodrow Hotel in New York, where they received numerous contract offers from fellow countrymen living in the city. Kabos accepted the manager position of a small Hungarian troupe, but in letters he complained that his colleagues were without talent. They went for a 2-week long tour including Philadelphia, Trenton, Passaic. As he described, movie theatre owners tried to ruin their shows, and seats were half empty, even while admission prices were less than half the price of movie tickets. In April 1939 the group continued to tour in Chicago and Detroit, with Kabos making extra appearances, often 4 times a day. But even as such, earnings remained miserable. Their situation got worse when his wife was moved to a hospital with liver failure, needing an immediate operation, using up most of their spare money. Sándor Incze, a renowned theatrical figure also in exile, offered Kabos a role in New York, but after traveling there, he declined, partly after discovering that he didn't speak the theatrical English language. Meanwhile in Hungary, the attacks again him become more powerful, even questioning his nationality. By the summer of 1939, they start to run out of money. Kabos arranged a second tour with offhand groups, to mild success. He started to build a small theatre room out of a restaurant run by his friend, but failed after one month. Playing in small acts once or twice a week, the couple got enough money for basic food, otherwise they took walks in Central Park. Kabos wrote a small book about his life, directed an amateur movie sketch to tour with, and a 3-hour revue, all failing. With the help of a friend, he got a small role in one of the Broadway theatres, but had a heart attack on stage. His doctor ordered him to stop attending rehearsals, but he refused. Barely surviving two other seizures, he was moved to a hospital, where, after lying in an oxygen tent unconscious for two weeks, he died on 6 October 1941.

== Legacy ==
The funeral was managed by Ferenc Göndör, an immigrant friend. The actor was buried in Cedar Park Cemetery in Emerson, New Jersey under the name 'Kobas'. His adopted daughter Gabriella received a scrambled telegram from his mother with the news of the death, but the country only knew of it after the official statement from the MTI on 9 October. By this time in Hungary, Kabos's movies were banned, most of his colleagues denied work, and the country had been at war for 3 months. Newspapers only wrote the fact of death, as war news were the most important.

After the war, the first copies of Kabos movies reappeared for a short time, although most of them were lost during the battles. But the slowly established communist government thought them to be works of the aristocratic society of the past, and as such, not permitted for the working society – the copies were returned to their archival boxes and only reopened in the fifties and seventies, to short-lived successes. The softening political situation of the 1980s allowed the reappearance of his cinematic work in movies and the National Television, and later cable stations, recapturing his former fame. He was reburied in the Farkasréti Cemetery in Budapest, in the presence of large crowds.

== Filmography ==
Title	Character	Runtime
1931
Hyppolit, the Butler	Schneider Mátyás	80 min.
Egy autó és semmi pénz		
1932
Piri mindent tud	Bognár Béla	67 min.
Flying Gold	Cadar úr	51 min.
1933
Everything for the Woman		
1934
It Happened in March	bank executive Kende, Lili's father	66 min.
The Dream Car	Halmos Aladár	99 min.
Purple Lilacs	Angelusz	79 min.
The New Relative	Sándor főpincér/ Head waiter Alexander	83 min.
Emmy		70 min.
1935
The Students of Igloi		
Thanks for Knocking Me Down	Ferenc inas/ servant Franz	84 min.
Villa for Sale	Buckó József	75 min.
Budapest Pastry Shop	Schulmayer házgondnok/ House warden Shulmayer	84 min.
Miss President	Vas Ödön	84 min.
Hello, Budapest!		
Address Unknown	Stangl	82 min.
The Wise Mother	Kaiser, operettszerző/ operetta composer, Kaiser	74 min.
1936
Sensation	Szálka Leó	66 min.
Half-Rate Honeymoon	Fernauer Lajos cégvezető, CEO	85 min.
Three Dragons	Dr. Kempelen József	71 min.
Danube Rendezvous	Szalai ügynök/ agent Szalai	66 min.
1937
Pay Up, Madam!	Fábry Ágoston, malomtulajdonos/ Mill owner Agoston Fabry	65 min.
I May See Her Once a Week	Poznay	71 min.
An Affair of Honour	Virág Andor, könyvelő/ Andor Virag, accountant	86 min.
Torockói menyasszony	Herskovics	70 min.
Tales of Budapest	Vadász Lehel, az Atlantic Bank igazgatója/ executive of Atlantic bank	86 min.
Szerelembõl nõsültem	Barna	90 min.
Hotel Springtime	Megyeri Boldizsár	78 min.
Viki	Dr.Weiss	60 min.
The Borrowed Castle	Gruber Menyhért	85 min.
120 Kilometres an Hour	Richter Menyhért	71 min.
Lady Seeks a Room	Csahos Ödön, ügyvédjelölt/lawyer-to-be	82 min.
300 ezer pengõ az utcán		
Maga lesz a férjem!	Dr. Balogh Elemér	72 min.
A harapós férj	Dr. Zsengellér Bernát, ügyvéd/lawyer	82 min.
Where Do We Sleep on Sunday?	Virág Benõ	60 min.
1938
Pillanatnyi pénzzavar	Harry, sofőr/ chauffeur	81 min.
Borcsa Amerikában		
Billeting	Kulcsár úr, Tibor titkára	82 min.
Rosemary		
Döntõ pillanat	Kulinyi	85 min.
Fehérvári huszárok		65 min.
The Henpecked Husband	Kovács Gyula	76 min.

== Sources ==
- The life of Gyula Kabos on szineszkonyvtar.hu
- Gyula Kabos in the Hungarian Theatrical Lexicon, (György, Székely. Magyar Színházművészeti Lexikon. Budapest: Akadémiai Kiadó, 1994. ISBN 978-963-05-6635-3), freely available on mek.oszk.hu
- Tibor, Bános: Kabos Gyula Budapest: Athaneum, 2001. ISBN 963-9261-31-9
