= Sensation (1936 Hungarian film) =

1936 film

- Directed by: Steve Sekely; Ladislao Vajda
- Written by: Ferenc Herczeg; Gyula K. Halász; Márton Keleti; Károly Kristóf; Jenõ Szatmári; László Vadnay
- Produced by: Ernö Gál; Béla Keleti
- Starring: Irén Ágay; Gyula Kabos; Zoltán Makláry
- Cinematography: Rudolf Icsey; Karl Kurzmayer
- Edited by: József Szilas
- Music by: Tibor Polgár
- Production company: Magyar Film Iroda
- Release date: 22 October 1936
- Running time: 81 minutes
- Country: Hungary
- Language: Hungarian

Sensation (Hungarian: Szenzáció) is a 1936 Hungarian comedy drama film directed by Steve Sekely and Ladislao Vajda and starring Irén Ágay, Gyula Kabos and Zoltán Makláry. It was shot at the Hunnia Studios in Budapest. The film's sets were designed by the art director József Pán.

== Synopsis ==
A journalist and his editor discuss stories and the need for sensation in the news. Four different stories are then portrayed including one in which a down-on-his-luck many takes employment in a circus as the assistant to a knife thrower.

== Cast ==
- Irén Ágay as Katica
- Gyula Kabos as Szálka Leó
- Zoltán Makláry as Gordon
- Ferenc Kiss as Bányamunkás
- Lajos Gárdonyi as Föszerkesztö
- Sándor Pethes as Cirkuszi titkár
- Sándor Peti as Elöfizetö
- Kálmán Rózsahegyi as Katica apja
- Ilona Erdös as Keretjáték
- Nusi Somogyi as Szálka felesége
- Zoltán Szakáts as Liszt Ferenc
- István Szegedi Szabó as Kocsis
- Menyhért Gulyás as Cirkuszi pénztárnál sorakozó férfi
- Gyula Szöreghy as Cirkuszigazgató
- Ferenc Pataki as Szerkesztöségi alkalmazott
- József Timár as Fömérnök
- László Vadnay as Self
- Ernö Verebes as Riporter

== Bibliography ==
- Khatib, Lina H., Storytelling in World Cinemas, Volume 1. Columbia University Press, 2012.
- Juhász, István, Kincses magyar filmtár 1931–1944: az eredeti forgatókönyvből 1931 és 1944 között létrejött hazai mozgóképekről. Kráter, 2007.
- Rîpeanu, Bujor. (ed.) International Directory of Cinematographers, Set- and Costume Designers in Film: Hungary (from the beginnings to 1988). Saur, 1981.
