= Me and My Grandfather =

1954 film

- Directed by: Viktor Gertler
- Written by: Boris Palotai
- Produced by: István Lénárt
- Starring: Kálmán Koletár; Éva Ruttkai; Gyula Gózon
- Cinematography: István Eiben
- Edited by: Mária Szécsényi
- Music by: Béla Csanak
- Production company: Mafilm
- Release date: 15 September 1955
- Running time: 104 minutes
- Country: Hungary
- Language: Hungarian

Me and My Grandfather (Hungarian: Én és a nagyapám) is a 1954 Hungarian comedy drama film directed by Viktor Gertler and starring Kálmán Koletár, Éva Ruttkai and Gyula Gózon. It was shot at the Hunnia Studios in Budapest. The film's sets were designed by the art director Iván Ambrózy.

== Cast ==
- Kálmán Koletár as Berci
- Éva Ruttkai as Margit néni
- Gyula Gózon as Nagyapa
- Samu Balázs as Králik
- Gábor Agárdi as Tanító
- Sándor Pethes as Kefehajú
- Gábor Balassa as Oszoli
- György Bikádi asDaru
- László Csorba as Bakos
- Marika Egri as Jutka
- Tamás Ferkai as Kubicska
- Endre Gyárfás as Misi
- László Horváth as Ferkó
- Éva Kelemen as Daruné
- Gyula Kovács as Zách
- Marika Kuti as Sári
- György Kádár as Veres
- Mária Madarász as Zsuzsa
- Gábor Rajnay as Gondnok
- Magda Vígh as Daru Kati

== Bibliography ==
- Balski, Grzegorz . Directory of Eastern European Film-makers and Films 1945-1991. Flicks Books, 1992.
- Liehm, Mira & Liehm, Antonín J. The Most Important Art: Soviet and Eastern European Film After 1945. University of California Press, 1980.
- Ostrowska, Dorota, Pitassio, Francesco & Varga, Zsuzsanna. Popular Cinemas in East Central Europe: Film Cultures and Histories. Bloomsbury Publishing, 2017
