= Dreams of Love (1935 German film) =

1935 film

- Austrian poster
- Directed by: Heinz Hille
- Written by: Heinz Hille; Werner Kortwich
- Starring: Franz Herterich; Walter Steinbeck; Olga Chekhova
- Cinematography: István Eiben
- Edited by: Viktor Bánky
- Music by: Ernst Erich Buder
- Production company: Attila-Film
- Distributed by: Tassul Film
- Release date: 18 October 1935
- Countries: Austria; Germany; Hungary
- Language: German

Dreams of Love (German: Liebesträume) is a 1935 historical biographical drama film directed by Heinz Hille and starring Franz Herterich, Walter Steinbeck and Olga Chekhova. It was a co-production between German, Austria and Hungary, and was released as Die Pusztakomtesse in Austria. It was shot at the Hunnia Studios in Budapest and on location in Tata. The film's sets were designed by the art director Márton Vincze. Hille also directed the separate Hungarian-language version Dream Love with a different cast.

The film depicts the composer Franz Liszt and takes its name from his 1850 piano work of the same title.

== Cast ==
- Franz Herterich as Franz Liszt
- Walter Steinbeck as Graf Duday
- Olga Chekhova as Gräfin Madeleine Duday
- Erika Dannhoff as Komtesse Maria Duday
- Olga Engl as Gräfin Emilie Duday - ihre Großmutter
- Hans Söhnker as Leutnant Baron Koloman von Eötvös
- Aribert Mog as Hans Wendland - Schüler Liszts
- Paul Wagner as Hauptmann von Uslar
- Franz Weber as Baron Pekry
- Paul Henckels as Spiridion - Diener Liszts
- Tibor Halmay as Pali, Diener bei Eötvös
- Karl Platen as Jancsi, Diener bei Duday

== Bibliography ==
- Raykoff, Ivan. Dreams of Love: Playing the Romantic Pianist. Oxford University Press, 2014.
- Winkel, Roel Vande & Welch, David. Cinema and the Swastika: The International Expansion of Third Reich Cinema. Palgrave MacMillan, 2011.
