= The Siege of Beszterce =

1948 film

- Directed by: Márton Keleti
- Written by: István Békeffy; László Hárs
- Based on: The Siege of Beszterce by Kálmán Mikszáth
- Produced by: László Szirtes
- Starring: Klári Tolnay; Ida Turay; Andor Ajtay
- Cinematography: István Eiben
- Edited by: Sándor Zákonyi
- Music by: Tibor Polgár
- Production company: Orient Film
- Release date: 18 August 1948
- Running time: 100 minutes
- Country: Hungary
- Language: Hungarian

The Siege of Beszterce (Hungarian: Beszterce ostroma) is a 1948 Hungarian historical drama film directed by Márton Keleti and starring Klári Tolnay, Ida Turay and Andor Ajtay. It was based on the novel of the same title by Kálmán Mikszáth. It was shot at the Hunnia Studios in Budapest. The film's sets were designed by the art director Mátyás Varga.

== Cast ==
- Klári Tolnay as Apolka
- Ida Turay as Estella
- Andor Ajtay as Pongrácz István gróf
- Gábor Rajnay as Behenczy papa
- Kamill Feleki as Behenczi Károly
- Lajos Básti as Tarnóczy
- Márton Rátkai as Pruzsinszky
- Sándor Pethes as Pamutkay
- Árpád Lehotay as Pongrácz ezredes
- Éva Ruttkai as Ancsura
- Mariska Vízváry as Rogyákné
- Vilmos Komlós as Bogdán, adóvégrehajtó
- László Keleti as Kocsis
- Gyula Justh as Pincér

== Bibliography ==
- Cunningham, John. Hungarian Cinema: From Coffee House to Multiplex. Wallflower Press, 2004.
- Goble, Alan. The Complete Index to Literary Sources in Film. Walter de Gruyter, 1999.
- Liehm, Mira & Liehm, Antonín J. The Most Important Art: Soviet and Eastern European Film After 1945. University of California Press, 1980.
