= Emmy (film) =

1934 film

- Directed by: Steve Sekely
- Written by: Viktor Rákosi (novel); József Lengyel; István Mihály
- Starring: Gábor Rajnay; Irén Ágay; Ella Gombaszögi; Pál Jávor
- Cinematography: István Eiben
- Edited by: József Szilas
- Music by: Szabolcs Fényes
- Production company: Mûvész Film
- Release date: 21 December 1934
- Running time: 79 minutes
- Country: Hungary
- Language: Hungarian

Emmy is a 1934 Hungarian comedy film directed by Steve Sekely and starring Gábor Rajnay, Irén Ágay and Ella Gombaszögi. It is based on a novel by Viktor Rákosi. It was shot at the Hunnia Studios in Budapest. The film's sets were designed by the art director Márton Vincze.

== Cast ==
- Gábor Rajnay as Maleczky ezredes
- Irén Ágay as Emmy
- Ella Gombaszögi as Melitta, társalkodónö
- Pál Jávor as Korponay László
- Antal Páger as Pálóczy
- Mici Erdélyi as Tapsika, szubrett
- Gyula Kabos as Sztringai Jakab
- Karola Zala as Váthyné
- Blanka Szombathelyi as Böske
- László Keleti as Benkovics önkéntes
- György Kerekes as Petri önkéntes
- Imre Apáthi as Pozdorjai önkéntes
- László Dezsõffy as Õrmester
- Zoltán Makláry as Csárdás
- Gyula Gózon as Markos

== Bibliography ==
- Bolton, Lucy & Wright Julie Lobalzo (ed.) Lasting Screen Stars: Images that Fade and Personas that Endure. Springer, 2016.
