= Romance in Budapest =

1933 film

- Directed by: Steve Sekely; Géza von Bolváry
- Written by: Sándor Faragó (play); Aladar Laszlo (play); Károly Nóti
- Produced by: Joe Pasternak
- Starring: Franciska Gaal; Paul Hörbiger; S.Z. Sakall
- Edited by: István Eiben
- Music by: Nicholas Brodszky
- Production companies: Deutsche Universal-Film; Hunnia Filmgyár
- Distributed by: Universal Pictures
- Release date: 24 October 1933
- Running time: 96 minutes
- Country: Hungary
- Language: Hungarian

Romance in Budapest (Hungarian: Pardon, tévedtem) is a 1933 Hungarian romantic comedy film directed by Steve Sekely and Géza von Bolváry and starring Franciska Gaal, Paul Hörbiger and S.Z. Sakall. It was shot at the Hunnia Studios in Budapest and on location around Balatonszabadi and Siófok. It is now considered a lost film. A separate German-language version Scandal in Budapest was also released.

== Cast ==
- Franciska Gaal as Balogh Éva
- Paul Hörbiger as Murray Pál zongoramûvész
- S.Z. Sakall as Strangel úr, Murray menedzsere
- Lili Berky as Éva anyja
- Mici Erdélyi as Tini, Éva barátnõ
- Gyula Gózon as Éva apja
- Gábor Kertész as Tini võlegénye
- Mira Truszka as Rajongó lány
- Emmi Buttykay
- Jenõ Farkas
- Steven Geray
- Ella Gombaszögi
- Sándor Góth
- Károly Huszár
- Livia Miklós
- Márton Rátkai
- Annie Réthy
- Éva Szaplonczay
- Ilona Szilvássy

== Bibliography ==
- Cunningham, John. Hungarian Cinema: From Coffee House to Multiplex. Wallflower Press, 2004.
- Juhász, István. Kincses magyar filmtár 1931-1944: az eredeti forgatókönyvből 1931 és 1944 között létrejött hazai mozgóképekről. Kráter, 2007.
- Rîpeanu, Bujor. (ed.) International Directory of Cinematographers, Set- and Costume Designers in Film: Hungary (from the beginnings to 1988). Saur, 1981.
