= Irén Ágay =

Hungarian actress (1912–1950)

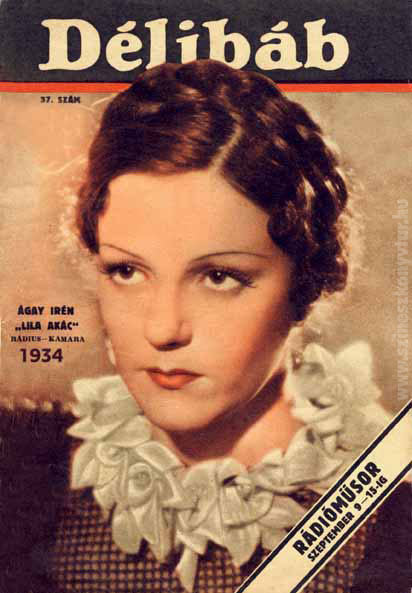
- Born: February 23, 1912; Budapest, Austria-Hungary
- Died: September 2, 1950 (aged 38); Hollywood, California, U.S.
- Occupation: Actress
- Years active: 1933–1946
- Spouse: Steve Sekely (1933–1950; her death)

Irén Ágay (23 February 1912 – 2 September 1950) was a Hungarian actress. She was a leading star of 1930s Hungarian cinema, before emigrating to the United States.

== Selected filmography ==
- Miss Iza (1933)
- Romance of Ida (1934)
- Everything for the Woman (1934)
- Purple Lilacs (1934)
- Cornflower (1934)
- Emmy (1934)
- Address Unknown (1935)
- Her Highness Dances the Waltz (1935)
- Sensation (1936)
- Half-Rate Honeymoon (1936)
- Help, I'm an Heiress (1937)
- Hochzeitsreise zu 50% (1937)
- Maga lesz a férjem (1938)
- Two Prisoners (1938)
- The Fabulous Suzanne (1946)
