= Pay Up, Madam! =

1937 film

- Directed by: Ákos Ráthonyi
- Written by: Tamás Emöd; Károly Nóti; Ákos Ráthonyi; Rezsö Török
- Produced by: György Engel
- Starring: Gyula Kabos; Lili Muráti; Pál Jávor
- Cinematography: Tamás Keményffy
- Edited by: Zoltán Farkas
- Music by: Károly Komjáthy
- Production company: Focusfilm
- Release date: 11 March 1937
- Running time: 66 minutes
- Country: Hungary
- Language: Hungarian

Pay Up, Madam! (Hungarian: Fizessen, nagysád!) is a 1937 Hungarian comedy film directed by Ákos Ráthonyi and starring Gyula Kabos, Lili Muráti and Pál Jávor. It was shot at the Hunnia Studios in Budapest.

== Synopsis ==
A wealthy mill owner is outraged when he discovers that his daughter has fallen in love with his mill manager. He hires a new manager on the strict understanding he is to avoid his daughter. Inevitable she falls in love with him, and manoeuvres things so that she ends up with him rather than the suitor her father has picked out for her.

== Cast ==
- Gyula Kabos as Fábry Ágoston
- Lili Muráti as Zsuzsi
- Ella Gombaszögi as Poldi
- Pál Jávor as Szilágyi Péter
- Kálmán Latabár as Bukovác Pá
- Sándor Peti as Domokos
- József Baróthy as Id. Müller
- Mihály Dávid as A grófnö komornyikja
- György Dénes as Müller
- Sándor Góth as Ügyvéd
- Adrien Hollán as Margit
- Karola Zala as Grófnö

== Bibliography ==
- Juhász, István. Kincses magyar filmtár 1931-1944: az eredeti forgatókönyvből 1931 és 1944 között létrejött hazai mozgóképekről. Kráter, 2007.
- Ostrowska, Dorota, Pitassio, Francesco & Varga, Zsuzsanna. Popular Cinemas in East Central Europe: Film Cultures and Histories. Bloomsbury Publishing, 2017.
- Rîpeanu, Bujor. (ed.) International Directory of Cinematographers, Set- and Costume Designers in Film: Hungary (from the beginnings to 1988). Saur, 1981.
