= Stefan Lhotka =

Hungarian art director

- Born: 16 May 1884; Budapest, Austria-Hungary
- Died: 21 February 1938 (aged 53); Budapest, Hungary
- Other name: István Szirontai Lhotka
- Occupation: Art director
- Years active: 1916–1938 (film)

István Szirontai Lhotka (1884–1938) was a Hungarian art director known for his film set designs in Germany and his native Hungary. He is frequently known as Stefan Lhotka, the name by which he was credited on his German films.

== Selected filmography ==
- The Maharaja's Favourite Wife (1921)
- The Golden Plague (1921)
- The Inheritance of Tordis (1921)
- Ilona (1921)
- Certificates of Death (1923)
- Nanon (1924)
- Orient (1924)
- The Doll Queen (1925)
- Superfluous People (1926)
- The Prisoners of Shanghai (1927)
- The Ghost Train (1933)
- The Wise Mother (1935)
- The Students of Igloi (1935)
- Kind Stepmother (1935)
- Cobweb (1936)
- Viki (1937)
- The Mysterious Stranger (1937)
- There Are Exceptions (1937)

== Bibliography ==
- Rentschler, Eric. The Films of G.W. Pabst: An Extraterritorial Cinema. Rutgers University Press, 1990.
- Rhodes, Gary Don. Lugosi: His Life in Films, on Stage, and in the Hearts of Horror Lovers. McFarland, 2015.
- Rîpeanu, Bujor. (ed.) International Directory of Cinematographers, Set- and Costume Designers in Film: Hungary (from the beginnings to 1988). Saur, 1981.
