= Hello, Budapest! =

1935 film

- Directed by: Ladislao Vajda
- Written by: László Békeffi; Gyula K. Halász; Károly Kristóf
- Produced by: Ernő Gál
- Starring: Gyula Kabos; Rosy Barsony; Piroska Vaszary
- Cinematography: Andor Vidor
- Music by: Szabolcs Fényes
- Production company: Thalia Film
- Release date: 15 October 1935
- Running time: 70 minutes
- Country: Hungary
- Language: Hungarian

Hello, Budapest! (Hungarian: Halló Budapest!) is a 1935 Hungarian musical comedy film directed by Ladislao Vajda and starring Gyula Kabos, Rosy Barsony and Piroska Vaszary. It was shot at the Hunnia Studios in Budapest. The film's sets were designed by the art director József Pán.

== Cast ==
- Gyula Kabos as Kecskés
- Rosy Barsony as Takács Sári
- Piroska Vaszary as Boriska
- Gerö Mály as Siket úr
- Lili Filótás as Rádióbemondónö
- Attila Petheö as Vezérigazgató
- Árpád Radó as Rádióbemondó
- Zoltán Szakáts as Rádió förendezõ
- Margit Aknay
- Gizi Bajor
- László Békeffi
- Szabolcs Fényes
- Anna Gyenge
- Gizi Hertay
- Jenõ Hubay
- Lajos Ihász
- Ferenc Kiss
- Mária Németh
- Sándor Pethes
- Sándor Peti
- Lajos Solymossy
- Imre Stefániai
- Sándor Svéd
- Miklós Szedõ

== Bibliography ==
- Juhász, István. Kincses magyar filmtár 1931-1944: az eredeti forgatókönyvből 1931 és 1944 között létrejött hazai mozgóképekről. Kráter, 2007.
- Ostrowska, Dorota, Pitassio, Francesco & Varga, Zsuzsanna. Popular Cinemas in East Central Europe: Film Cultures and Histories. Bloomsbury Publishing, 2017
- Rîpeanu, Bujor. (ed.) International Directory of Cinematographers, Set- and Costume Designers in Film: Hungary (from the beginnings to 1988). Saur, 1981.
