= Half-Rate Honeymoon =

1936 film

- Directed by: Steve Sekely
- Written by: Gyula K. Halász; Károly Kristóf
- Produced by: Ferenc Szigeti
- Starring: Irén Ágay; Pál Jávor; Gyula Kabos; György Dénes
- Cinematography: István Eiben
- Music by: Pál Gyöngy
- Production company: Lux Film
- Release date: 27 October 1936
- Running time: 85 minutes
- Country: Hungary
- Language: Hungarian

Half-Rate Honeymoon (Hungarian: Nászút féláron) is a 1936 Hungarian romance film directed by Steve Sekely and starring Irén Ágay, Pál Jávor and Gyula Kabos. A German-language version Hochzeitsreise zu 50% was also released.

== Synopsis ==
A Hungarian couple take advantage of a cut-price holiday offer in Italy where they visit many of the major sights.

== Cast ==
- Irén Ágay as Kató Kovács
- Pál Jávor as Pál Kerekes, engineer
- Gyula Kabos as Lajos Pernauer
- György Dénes as Majer jr.
- Mici Erdélyi as Lujza
- Lajos Köpeczi-Boócz as Majer Sr., chief executive officer

== Bibliography ==
- Cunningham, John. Hungarian Cinema: From Coffee House to Multiplex. Wallflower Press, 2004.
