= The Wise Mother =

1935 Hungarian film

- Directed by: Emil Martonffi
- Written by: István Békeffy; Emil Martonffi
- Produced by: Jenõ Deák
- Starring: Antal Páger; Mici Erdélyi; Júlia Komár
- Cinematography: Ferenc Gergelits
- Edited by: Zoltán Farkas
- Music by: Dezsõ Horváth; Lajos Lajtai; László Virány
- Production company: Stylus Film
- Release date: 5 March 1935
- Running time: 90 minutes
- Country: Hungary
- Language: Hungarian

The Wise Mother (Hungarian: Az okos mama) is a 1935 Hungarian comedy film directed by Emil Martonffi and starring Antal Páger, Mici Erdélyi and Júlia Komár. The film's sets were designed by the art director István Szirontai Lhotka.

== Cast ==
- Antal Páger as Kállay Zolkó
- Emmi Kosáry as Tatár Éva
- Mici Erdélyi as Zizi
- Júlia Komár as Kató
- György Dénes as Dr. Havas Ervin
- Imre Ráday as Lederer Teddy báró
- Jenö Törzsas Tabódy János
- Klári Tolnay as Erzsike
- Gyula Kabos as Kayser
- Sándor Pethes as Pemete
- László Z. Molnár as Keresztessy
- Béla Salamon as Fuchs
- Ila Szász as Berta
- Ferenc Pethes as Portás
- Lajos Sugár as János
- Zsóka Ölvedy as Bözsi
- Ferenc Pataki as Katóék inasa

== Bibliography ==
- Juhász, István. Kincses magyar filmtár 1931-1944: az eredeti forgatókönyvből 1931 és 1944 között létrejött hazai mozgóképekről. Kráter, 2007.
- Rîpeanu, Bujor. (ed.) International Directory of Cinematographers, Set- and Costume Designers in Film: Hungary (from the beginnings to 1988). Saur, 1981.
- Vilmos, Várkonyi. Jávor Pál: és a magyar film aranykora. Zima Szabolcs, 2013
