= Janos the Valiant =

1939 film

- Directed by: Béla Gaál
- Written by: Károly Bakonyi; Jenö Heltai; Gyula Somogyváry
- Based on: János vitéz by Sándor Petőfi
- Produced by: László Szirtes
- Starring: Margit Dajka; Imre Palló; Ferenc Kiss
- Cinematography: Karl Kurzmayer
- Edited by: Viktor Bánky
- Music by: Pongrác Kacsóh
- Production company: Kino Filmipari
- Release date: 26 January 1939
- Running time: 66 minutes
- Country: Hungary
- Language: Hungarian

Janos the Valiant (Hungarian: János vitéz) is a 1939 Hungarian musical fantasy adventure film directed by Béla Gaál and starring Margit Dajka, Imre Palló and Ferenc Kiss. It is inspired by the epic poem János vitéz by Sándor Petőfi. The film's sets were designed by the art director József Pán.

== Cast ==
- Margit Dajka as Iluska
- Imre Palló as Kukorica Jancsi ("Johnny Grain o' Corn")
- Ferenc Kiss as Bagó
- Piri Peéry as stepmother of Iluska
- Gyula Csortos as Prussian King
- Erzsi Simor as Prussian Princess
- Tibor Vitéz as Sergeant
- Gyula Gózon as Field-guard
- Tivadar Bilicsi as astrologer
- Izabella Nagy as wife of bartender
- Menyhért Gulyás as old uncle peasant
- Lajos Kelemen as Turkish pasha
- Ferenc Pataki as astrologer

== Bibliography ==
- Guesnet, François, Lupovitch, Howard & Polonsky, Antony(ed.) Polin: Studies in Polish Jewry Volume 31: Poland and Hungary: Jewish Realities Compared. Liverpool University Press, 2018.
- Juhász, István. Kincses magyar filmtár 1931-1944: az eredeti forgatókönyvből 1931 és 1944 között létrejött hazai mozgóképekről. Kráter, 2007.
- Rîpeanu, Bujor. (ed.) International Directory of Cinematographers, Set- and Costume Designers in Film: Hungary (from the beginnings to 1988). Saur, 1981.
