= The Henpecked Husband =

1938 film

- Directed by: Johann von Vásáry
- Written by: István Mihály
- Produced by: István Falus
- Starring: Gyula Kabos; Mici Erdélyi; Tivadar Bilicsi
- Cinematography: Rudolf Icsey
- Edited by: Zoltán Farkas
- Music by: Tibor Kálmán; Mária Pataky; Béla Zerkovitz
- Production company: Photophon Film
- Release date: 1 September 1938
- Running time: 76 minutes
- Country: Hungary
- Language: Hungarian

The Henpecked Husband (Hungarian: Papucshös) is a 1938 Hungarian comedy film directed by Johann von Vásáry and starring Gyula Kabos, Mici Erdélyi and Tivadar Bilicsi. It was shot at the Hunnia Studios in Budapest. The film's sets were designed by the art director József Pán.

== Cast ==
- Gyula Kabos as Kovács Gyula
- Mici Erdélyi as Nelly
- Tivadar Bilicsi as Kubala
- Piroska Vaszary as Ráczné
- Erzsi Orsolya as Elvira
- Éva Libertiny as Manci
- Valéria Hidvéghy as Vendég Ráczéknál
- Sándor Pethes as Rácz Péter
- Ernõ Szenes as Imre
- Gusztáv Vándory as Ödön
- Éva Szaplonczay as Mici
- Marika Lányi as Lili
- Géza Berczy as Rimóczy Laci
- Dezsõ Szabó as Horváth Menyhért
- József Berky as Cigányprímás
- Kató Bárczy as Lulu
- István Dózsa as Kávéházi vendég
- Gabi Endre as Révészné
- Dóra Fáy Kiss as Révészné
- Béla Fáy as Szakállas vendég
- Aranka Gazdy as Lujza
- Dezsõ Kertész as Balogh Miklós
- Irma Lányi as Házmesterné
- Tihamér Lázár as Kovács barátja
- Géza Márky as vendég Ráczék estélyén
- Ilona Náday as vendég Ráczék estélyén

== Bibliography ==
- Juhász, István. Kincses magyar filmtár 1931-1944: az eredeti forgatókönyvből 1931 és 1944 között létrejött hazai mozgóképekről. Kráter, 2007.
- Rîpeanu, Bujor. (ed.) International Directory of Cinematographers, Set- and Costume Designers in Film: Hungary (from the beginnings to 1988). Saur, 1981.
