= Mici Erdélyi =

Hungarian actress (1910–1994)

Mici Erdélyi (Born Mária Ernesztina Erdélyi; 11 September 1910 – July 1994) was a Hungarian actress.

She was born in Teschen, Austria-Hungary (today split between Cieszyn, Poland and Český Těšín, Czech Republic) and died in Santa Monica, California.

== Selected filmography ==
- Hyppolit, the Butler (1931)
- Romance in Budapest (1933)
- Emmy (1934)
- Cornflower (1934)
- The Wise Mother (1935)
- Kind Stepmother (1935)
- Thanks for Knocking Me Down (1935)
- Half-Rate Honeymoon (1936)
- It Was Me (1936)
- Cobweb (1936)
- Sweet Revenge (1937)
- Rézi Friday (1938)
- The Henpecked Husband (1938)
- The Minister's Friend (1939)
- Matthew Arranges Things (1940)
- Let's Love Each Other (1941)
- Katyi (1942)
- Dream Waltz (1943)
- Siamese Cat (1943)
- Jómadár (1943)
