= Flying Gold =

1932 film

- Directed by: Steve Sekely
- Written by: Gaston Leroux (novel); István Mihály; Pierre-Gilles Veber
- Starring: Steven Geray; Gyula Kabos; Lajos Gárday; Emmi Buttykay
- Cinematography: István Eiben; J. Peverell Marley
- Production company: Osso Film
- Release date: 4 December 1932
- Running time: 74 minutes
- Country: Hungary
- Language: Hungarian

Flying Gold (Hungarian: Repülő arany) is a 1932 Hungarian crime film directed by Steve Sekely and starring Steven Geray, Gyula Kabos and Lajos Gárday. It was shot at the Hunnia Studios in Budapest. A French-language version Rouletabille aviateur was also released.

== Synopsis ==
A shipment of gold being flown from Paris to Budapest is robbed in mid-air.

== Cast ==
- Steven Geray as Bálint György, az Esti Hírek újságírója
- Gyula Kabos as Cadar, francia riporter
- Lajos Gárday as Bandita
- Emmi Buttykay as Bálint ismerõse
- László Dezsõffy as Szállodai detektív
- Lajos Gellért as Hubner
- Sándor Góth as Báthory, rendõrtanácsos
- Gyula Justh as Portás
- Gyözö Kabók as Parasztember
- László Keleti as Kínai péklegény
- Gábor Kertész
- Zoltán Makláry as Tisztviselõ
- Zoltán Pethö as Pilóta
- Blanca Valery as Sonja Grygorine
- Éva Vass as Báthory lánya

== Bibliography ==
- Paris, Michael. From the Wright Brothers to Top Gun: Aviation, Nationalism, and Popular Cinema. Manchester University Press, 1995
- Cunningham, John. Hungarian Cinema: From Coffee House to Multiplex. Wallflower Press, 2004.
