= Three Dragons =

1936 film

- Directed by: Ladislao Vajda
- Written by: Sándor Hunyady
- Based on: Three Dragons by Sándor Hunyady
- Produced by: Ferenc Pless
- Starring: Mária Lázár; Szeréna Sziklay; Lili Berky
- Cinematography: Károly Kurzmayer
- Edited by: György Feld
- Music by: Sándor Szlatinay
- Production company: Harmónia Film
- Release date: 29 October 1936
- Running time: 71 minutes
- Country: Hungary
- Language: Hungarian

Three Dragons (Hungarian: Három sárkány) is a 1936 Hungarian comedy film directed by Ladislao Vajda and starring Mária Lázár, Szeréna Sziklay and Lili Berky. It is based on the 1935 play of the same title by Sándor Hunyady. The film's sets were designed by the art director József Pán.

== Cast ==
- Mária Lázár as Tatár Anna
- Szeréna Sziklay as Juliska
- Lili Berky as Harmadik sárkány
- Gábor Rajnay as Id. Csaholyi Balázs
- József Juhász as Ifj. Csaholyi Balázs
- Lici Balla as Piri
- Gyula Kabos as Dr. Kempelen József
- Kálmán Rózsahegyi as Borza
- Gyula Gózon as Vörösvári
- Sándor Pethes as Dr. Balogh
- Éva Libertiny as Cselédlány
- Lili Bojár as Ágnes
- Karola Zala as Tatárné
- László Várnay as Színpadmester

== Bibliography ==
- Frey, David. Jews, Nazis and the Cinema of Hungary: The Tragedy of Success, 1929-1944. Bloomsbury Publishing, 2017.
- Juhász, István. Kincses magyar filmtár 1931-1944: az eredeti forgatókönyvből 1931 és 1944 között létrejött hazai mozgóképekről. Kráter, 2007.
- Rîpeanu, Bujor. (ed.) International Directory of Cinematographers, Set- and Costume Designers in Film: Hungary (from the beginnings to 1988). Saur, 1981.
