= Romance of Ida =

1934 film

- Directed by: Steve Sekely
- Written by: Géza Gárdonyi (novel); Adorján Stella; István Mihály
- Produced by: Ernö Gál
- Starring: Gábor Rajnay; Irén Ágay; Ella Gombaszögi; Pál Jávor
- Cinematography: István Eiben
- Edited by: József Szilas
- Music by: Szabolcs Fényes
- Production company: Thalia-Film
- Release date: 15 March 1934
- Running time: 75 minutes
- Country: Hungary
- Language: Hungarian

Romance of Ida (Hungarian: Ida regénye) is a 1934 Hungarian comedy film directed by Steve Sekely, starring Gábor Rajnay, Irén Ágay, and Pál Jávor. It is based on a novel by Géza Gárdonyi and was shot at the Hunnia Studios in Budapest. The film's sets were designed by the art director Márton Vincze.

When it premiered, an unknown critic enthusiastically praised the film in the pages of Nyugat: “Finally, the first Hungarian film that passes the test of objective criticism. The film still stumbling a little as it says what it must say, but it says it—because it knows—and thus it can advance to a higher class. At last, the first Hungarian film that can be Hungarian because it is Hungarian from within, and because from within— it is art… Irén Ágai, with her simplified yet captivating performance, already stands on the Hollywood Olympus… Pál Jávor: the marble statue had a few plaster parts here and there as well… The magnificent direction is the work of István Székely…”

The film is also referred to as My Wife the Miss.

== Cast ==
- Gábor Rajnay as Péter Ó
- Irén Ágay as Ida Ó
- Pál Jávor as János Balogh
- Ella Gombaszögi as Julis
- Gyula Gózon as Mr. Bogár
- Erzsi Paál as Ella
- Lili Berky as Abbess
- Sándor Pethes as Dr. Csorba
- Kató Eöry as Jolán
- Ida Turay as Fazekas
- Éva Fenyvessy as Housemaid
- Blanka Szombathelyi as Timár
- Annie Réthy as Mészkuthy
- Piri Peéry as Sister Ottilia
- Margit Ladomerszky as Sister Ladiszla
- Gerő Mály as Milkman
- Zoltán Makláry as Chauffeur
- Győző Zákányi as Máté
- László Dezsõffy as Theatre Director
- Böske T. Oláh as Wife of Theatre Director
- Erzsi Pártos as Ingenue
- Lajos Ihász as Leading Man
- Andor Sárossy as Butcher
- Ernő Király as Head Waiter

== Production ==
The film was completed in just two weeks, and post-production took no longer than two months.

== Reception ==
The film was such a success at the time of its release that viewers even came from abroad. In addition to the name of the writer, the performances of Pál Jávor, Irén Ágay (the director's wife), and Szabolcs Fényes' song "Odavagyok magáért" (I'm Going for You), which immediately became a hit and played a significant role in this success

== Adaptations ==
- Romance of Ida, a 2022 Hungarian television film adaptation is the third screen adaptation of the work. It follows two earlier versions, the main film and a 1974 TV version

== Bibliography ==
- Bolton, Lucy & Wright Julie Lobalzo (ed.) Lasting Screen Stars: Images that Fade and Personas that Endure. Springer, 2016.
