= Without Lies =

1946 film

- Directed by: Viktor Gertler
- Written by: László Bihari; Károly Nóti
- Produced by: Ferenc Hegedüs
- Starring: Kálmán Latabár; Lajos Básti; Ella Gombaszögi
- Cinematography: István Eiben
- Edited by: Zoltán Kerényi
- Music by: Szabolcs Fényes; Pál Schönberger; József Tihanyi
- Production company: Hunnia Filmstúdió
- Release date: 29 August 1946
- Running time: 100 minutes
- Country: Hungary
- Language: Hungarian

Without Lies (Hungarian: Hazugság nélkül) is a 1946 Hungarian romance film directed by Viktor Gertler and starring Kálmán Latabár, Lajos Básti and Ella Gombaszögi. It was shot at the Hunnia Studios in Budapest. The film's sets were designed by the art director József Pán. Separate versions were also made in German and Romanian.

== Cast ==
- Kálmán Latabár, as Laci
- Lajos Básti, as Péter
- Ella Gombaszögi, as Aunt Berta
- Lili Berky, as Aunt Berta
- Agi Polly, as Zsuzsi
- György Dénes, as Pista
- László Gonda, as Zsuzsi's singing and dancing partner
- Artúr Somlay, as Zsuzsi's father
- László Keleti, as waiter
- Erzsébet Sörös, as trial lady at the bar
- Berta Türk
- Gyula Gózon
- Hanna Landy
- Edit Hlatky
- György Lugossy
- George Tatar
- Ernõ Vashegyi

== Bibliography ==
- Balski, Grzegorz . Directory of Eastern European Film-makers and Films 1945-1991. Flicks Books, 1992.
- Rîpeanu, Bujor. (ed.) International Directory of Cinematographers, Set- and Costume Designers in Film: Hungary (from the beginnings to 1988). Saur, 1981.
