= Villa for Sale =

1935 film

- Film poster
- Hungarian: Ez a villa eladó
- Directed by: Géza von Cziffra
- Written by: Imre Harmath; László Vadnay; Géza von Cziffra
- Produced by: Mihály Körner
- Starring: Ernő Verebes; Ida Turay; Gyula Kabos; Lili Berky
- Cinematography: István Eiben
- Edited by: József Szilas
- Music by: Pál Gyöngy
- Production company: Hunnia Filmgyár
- Distributed by: Cinema-Film
- Release date: 10 April 1935
- Running time: 83 minutes
- Country: Hungary
- Language: Hungarian
- Budget: $111,000

Villa for Sale (Hungarian: Ez a villa eladó) is a 1935 Hungarian comedy film directed by Géza von Cziffra and starring Ernő Verebes, Ida Turay and Gyula Kabos. After he goes away on holiday, a wealthy man's servant accidentally puts his villa up for sale.

== Cast ==
- Ernő Verebes as György Hódy
- Ida Turay as Anni
- Gyula Kabos as József Buckó
- Lili Berky as Tóni néni
- Rózsi Csikós as Teri
- Gyula Gózon as Rizling, Buckó's brother
- István Somló as Betörõ
- Sándor Pethes as Dani, Betörõ's brother
- Gusztáv Pártos as Bedõ úr
- Tivadar Bilicsi as Tivadar Gereblyei
- László Keleti as Stuttering buyer
- Gyula Justh as János, the butler
