= Miss Iza =

1933 film

- Directed by: Steve Sekely
- Written by: István Békeffy; István Mihály
- Produced by: Ernő Gál
- Starring: Sári Fedák; Pál Jávor; Ella Gombaszögi
- Cinematography: István Eiben
- Edited by: Laslo Benedek; György Feld
- Music by: György Fejér; Alfréd Grósz; Albert Hetényi-Heidelberg; Béla Zerkovitz
- Production company: City Film
- Release date: 2 November 1933
- Running time: 97 minutes
- Country: Hungary
- Language: Hungarian

Miss Iza (Hungarian: Iza néni) is a 1933 Hungarian comedy film directed by Istvan Szekeley and starring Sári Fedák, Pál Jávor and Ella Gombaszögi. It was shot at the Hunnia Studios in Budapest. The film's sets were designed by the art director Márton Vincze. It was one of several Hungarian films made with the financial backing of French producer Adolphe Osso.

== Cast ==
- Sári Fedák as Aunt Iza
- Pál Jávor as Baló Bálint, forester
- Irén Ágay as Paksy Jolán
- Ella Gombaszögi
- Karola Zala
- Sándor Radó
- Sári Kürthy
- Kató Eõry
- Vilmos Komlós
- Károly Huszár
- Oscar Beregi Sr.
- Márton Rátkai
- Jenö Törzs
- György Dénes
- Gusztáv Vándory

== Bibliography ==
- Cunningham, John. Hungarian Cinema: From Coffee House to Multiplex. Wallflower Press, 2004.
- Frey, David. Jews, Nazis and the Cinema of Hungary: The Tragedy of Success, 1929-1944. Bloomsbury Publishing, 2017.
- Juhász, István. Kincses magyar filmtár 1931-1944: az eredeti forgatókönyvből 1931 és 1944 között létrejött hazai mozgóképekről. Kráter, 2007.
- Rîpeanu, Bujor. (ed.) International Directory of Cinematographers, Set- and Costume Designers in Film: Hungary (from the beginnings to 1988). Saur, 1981.
