= The Empress and the Hussar =

1935 film

- Directed by: István György
- Written by: Imre Farkas; István Mihály
- Produced by: Endre Verõ; Sándor Verõ
- Starring: Ilona Dajbukát; László Perényi; Lili Berky
- Cinematography: Lajos Berger Berend; József Bécsi
- Edited by: Zoltán Farkas
- Production company: Verofilm
- Release date: 25 December 1935
- Running time: 77 minutes 5 seconds
- Country: Hungary
- Language: Hungarian

The Empress and the Hussar (Hungarian: A királyné huszárja) is a 1935 Hungarian historical drama film directed by István György and starring Ilona Dajbukát, László Perényi and Lili Berky. It was shot at the Hunnia Studios in Budapest. The film's sets were designed by the art director József Pán.

== Cast ==
- Ilona Dajbukát as Erzsi, szakácsnõ
- László Perényi as Ikerváry György báró
- Lili Berky as Erzsébet királynõ
- Gyula Gózon as Keszeg Matyi, tisztiszolga
- Sándor Pethes as Szeles Berci
- Piroska Vaszary as Viki, Hohenfels felesége
- Piri Peéry as Stanzi, Marika nénje
- Magda Olthy as Steffy baronesse, Hohenfels lánya
- Klári Balogh as Nagy Marika színésznõ
- Nóra Apor as Éva, Steffy barátnõje
- József Berky as Cigányzenész
- Géza Boross as Hohenfels Nepomuk báró
- Jóska Dombi as Cigányprímás
- Kató Eõry as Udvarhölgy
- Nándor Gallai as Franzi, inas
- Vilmos Komlós as Döbröközi, színházigazgató
- Ilona Kökény as Meluzina
- Endre Markovits as Börtönõr
- Ferenc Pataki as Kropacsek Jóska, vendég a színházban
- Géza Rónai as Pipás huszárõrmester
- Imre Toronyi as Ezredes

== Plot ==
During an autumn military exercise first lieutenant György Ikerváry fell in love at first sight with Marika Nagy, a small-town girl who longed for a career as an actress. Unfortunately her aunt wants her to marry Berci Szeles and György Ikerváry's aunt wants him to marry Steffy. Steffy wants to marry Berci Szeles. In the end the queen let György Ikerváry marry Marika Nagy and all is well.

== Bibliography ==
- Cunningham, John. Hungarian Cinema: From Coffee House to Multiplex. Wallflower Press, 2004.
- Juhász, István. Kincses magyar filmtár 1931-1944: az eredeti forgatókönyvből 1931 és 1944 között létrejött hazai mozgóképekről. Kráter, 2007.
- Rîpeanu, Bujor. (ed.) International Directory of Cinematographers, Set- and Costume Designers in Film: Hungary (from the beginnings to 1988). Saur, 1981.
