= Cobweb (1936 film) =

1936 film

- Directed by: Mária Balázs
- Written by: Kálmán Csathó (novel); Mária Balázs; Endre László
- Produced by: Béla Lévay
- Starring: Ella Gombaszögi; Mici Erdélyi; Imre Ráday
- Cinematography: Rudolf Icsey
- Edited by: Zoltán Farkas
- Music by: Sándor László
- Production companies: Bioscop Film; Csaba Filmgyártó
- Release date: 26 September 1936
- Running time: 78 minutes
- Country: Hungary
- Language: Hungarian

Cobweb (Hungarian: Pókháló) is a 1936 Hungarian comedy film directed by Mária Balázs and starring Ella Gombaszögi, Mici Erdélyi and Imre Ráday. It was shot at the Hunnia Studios in Budapest. The film's sets were designed by the art director István Szirontai Lhotka.

== Cast ==
- Ella Gombaszögi as Marischel Lujza
- Mici Erdélyi as Simon Manci növendék
- Romola Németh as Irén, Ulrich lánya
- Imre Ráday as Fonyódi Miklós színész
- Béla Lévay as Bérczy egyetemi tanár
- Ilona Eszterházy as Klári, Bérczy lánya
- Attila Petheö as Dr. Ulrich Károly
- Zoltán Szakáts as Sándor, Irén tanára
- Sándor Pethes as Fõigazgató
- Irén Sitkey as Igazgatónõ
- Bobby Gray as Stage-manager
- Vali Rácz as énekesnõ
- Marcsa Simon as Nõegyleti titkár
- István Dózsa as János irodaszolga
- Anna Füzess as Ulrich neje
- Józsa Verböczy as Tyukodi Panci, görl-jelölt
- Bódogné Halmy as Nõegyleti fõtitkárnõ
- Irma Lányi as Nõegyleti tag
- Ferenc Pataki as Színházi ügynök
- Sándor Szalma as Pedellus

== Bibliography ==
- Juhász, István. Kincses magyar filmtár 1931-1944: az eredeti forgatókönyvből 1931 és 1944 között létrejött hazai mozgóképekről. Kráter, 2007.
- Rîpeanu, Bujor. (ed.) International Directory of Cinematographers, Set- and Costume Designers in Film: Hungary (from the beginnings to 1988). Saur, 1981.
