= Address Unknown (1935 film) =

1935 film directed by Béla Gaál

- Directed by: Béla Gaál
- Written by: Leslie Bush-Fekete; Steve Sekely
- Produced by: Richárd Horovitz; István Rado
- Starring: Irén Ágay; Imre Ráday; Gyula Kabos
- Cinematography: Heinrich Balasch
- Edited by: József Szilas
- Music by: Szabolcs Fényes
- Production company: Mûvész Film
- Release date: 21 December 1935
- Running time: 83 minutes
- Country: Hungary
- Language: Hungarian

Address Unknown (Hungarian: Címzett ismeretlen) is a 1935 Hungarian comedy film directed by Béla Gaál and starring Irén Ágay, Imre Ráday and Gyula Kabos. It was shot at the Hunnia Studios in Budapest and on location around Tihany and the resort town of Balatonföldvár on the shore of Lake Balaton. The film's sets were designed by the art director Márton Vincze.

== Cast ==
- Irén Ágay as Teri
- Imre Ráday as Pali
- Gyula Kabos as Stangl
- Piroska Vaszary as Postamesternö
- Sándor Góth as Papa
- Emmi Buttykay as Vevö
- Gyula Justh as Dr. Erdei Sándor
- Ilona Dajbukát as Vargáné
- Ernst Hauessermann as Toni
- Ella Góthné Kertész as Mama
- István Bársony as Varga
- László Keleti as Hugó
- József Kürthy as Az árvaház igazgatója
- Vera Pillér as Balogh Mici
- Boriska Jerabek as Titkárnö
- István Dózsa as Férfi a postán
- Miklós László as Idegenvezetö
- Sándor Solymossy as Turista
- Gusztáv Vándory

== Bibliography ==
- Juhász, István. Kincses magyar filmtár 1931-1944: az eredeti forgatókönyvből 1931 és 1944 között létrejött hazai mozgóképekről. Kráter, 2007.
- Rîpeanu, Bujor. (ed.) International Directory of Cinematographers, Set- and Costume Designers in Film: Hungary (from the beginnings to 1988). Saur, 1981.
- Vilmos, Várkonyi. Jávor Pál: és a magyar film aranykora. Zima Szabolcs, 2013
