= Purple Lilacs =

1934 film

- Directed by: Steve Sekely
- Written by: István Mihály
- Based on: Purple Lilacs by Ernő Szép
- Produced by: Ernő Gál
- Starring: Irén Ágay; Irén Biller; György Nagy
- Cinematography: István Eiben
- Edited by: József Szilas
- Music by: Paul Abraham
- Production company: Patria Film
- Release date: 6 September 1934
- Running time: 79 minutes
- Country: Hungary
- Language: Hungarian

Purple Lilacs (Hungarian: Lila akác) is a 1934 Hungarian musical comedy film directed by Steve Sekely and starring Irén Ágay, Irén Biller and György Nagy. It was shot at the Hunnia Studios in Budapest. The film's sets were designed by the art director Márton Vincze. It is based on the 1919 novel of the same title by Ernő Szép which was later remade as a 1973 film.

== Cast ==
- Irén Ágay as Manci Tóth
- Irén Biller as Hédi
- György Nagy as Pali
- Gyula Kabos as Angelusz
- Gyula Gózon as Weber
- Márton Rátkai as Zsezsé
- Ilona Eszterházy as Lili
- László Z. Molnár as Körmendi
- Sándor Pethes as Bajnóczi
- István Berend a sportsman
- Nusi Somogyi as Mili
- Stephen Bekassy as Charlie
- László Dezsőffy as Józsi
- Ernő Király a street singer
- Ferenc Antók extra
- Harry Csáktornyai as Elemér
- Anni Eisen extra
- László Keleti a milkman
- Irma Lányi as Vendég
- Sári Némethy as Hédi Arany's maid
- Dezső Pártos extra
- Éva Ruttkai unknown role

== Bibliography ==
- Goble, Alan. The Complete Index to Literary Sources in Film. Walter de Gruyter, 1999.
- Ostrowska, Dorota, Pitassio, Francesco & Varga, Zsuzsanna. Popular Cinemas in East Central Europe: Film Cultures and Histories. Bloomsbury Publishing, 2017.
- Rîpeanu, Bujor. (ed.) International Directory of Cinematographers, Set- and Costume Designers in Film: Hungary (from the beginnings to 1988). Saur, 1981.
- Somlyódy, László & Somlyódy, Nóra. Hungarian Arts and Sciences: 1848-2000. Social Science Monographs, 2003.
