= The New Relative =

1934 film

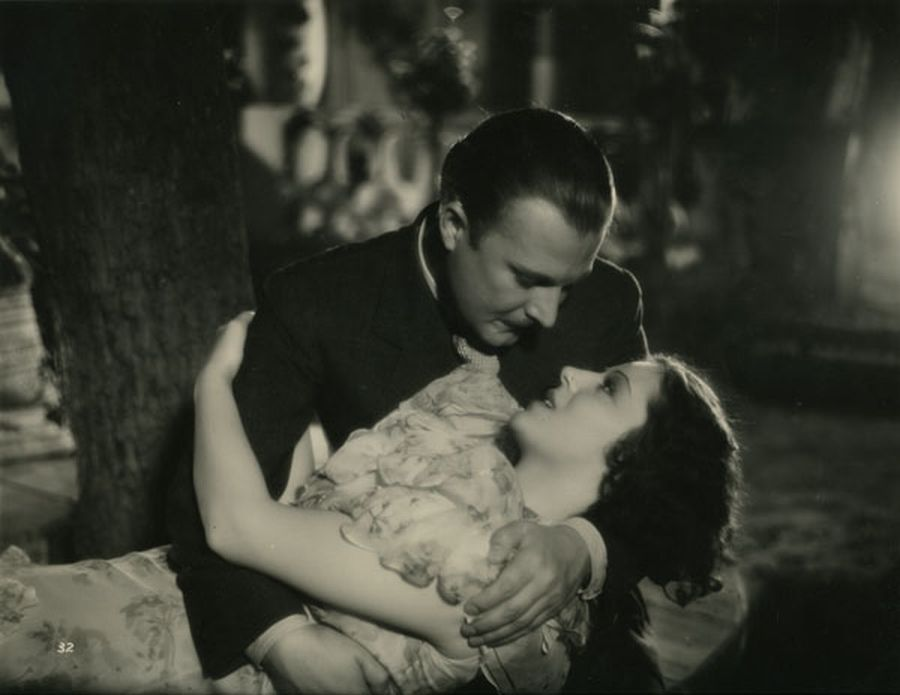
- Scene from the film
- Directed by: Béla Gaál
- Written by: Kálmán Csathó; Károly Nóti
- Starring: Zita Perczel
- Release date: 6 September 1934
- Running time: 91 minutes
- Country: Hungary
- Language: Hungarian

The New Relative (Hungarian: Az új rokon) is a 1934 Hungarian comedy film directed by Béla Gaál.

== Cast ==
- Zita Perczel as Kitty (as Perczel Zitta)
- Ferenc Delly as Esztáry Miklós
- Gyula Gózon as Esztáry Sándor
- Lili Berky as Tóni néni, Esztáry felesége (as Berky Lilly)
- Ella Gombaszögi as Emma néni
- Gyula Kabos as Sámson fõpincér
- Ida Turay as Málcsi (as Turai Ida)
- Sándor Pethes as Bernáth István
- Attila Petheö as Ujváry (as Pethõ Attila)
- Erzsi Ákos as Ujváry Irén
- Klári Tolnay as Kenyereslány
