= György Dénes =

Hungarian actor

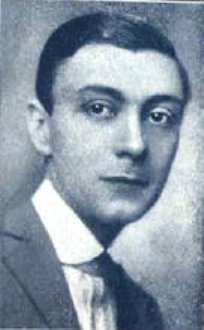
- György Dénes during the 1920s
- Born: 2 July 1898; Budapest, Austro-Hungarian Empire
- Died: 14 April 1962 (aged 63); Budapest, Hungary
- Occupation: Actor
- Years active: 1918–1953 (film)

György Dénes (2 July 1898 – 14 April 1962) was a Hungarian stage and film actor. He appeared in more than forty films during his career.

== Selected filmography ==
- Miss Iza (1933)
- Everything for the Woman (1934)
- The Students of Igloi (1935)
- The Wise Mother (1935)
- Dream Love (1935)
- St. Peter's Umbrella (1935)
- Half-Rate Honeymoon (1936)
- Be True Until Death (1936)
- Pay Up, Madam! (1937)
- All Men Are Crazy (1937)
- Help, I'm an Heiress (1937)
- 120 Kilometres an Hour (1937)
- Man Sometimes Errs (1938)
- Rosemary (1938)
- The Minister's Friend (1939)
- The Ball Is On (1939)
- Yes or No? (1940)
- The White Train (1943)
- I'll Make You Happy (1944)
- The Schoolmistress (1945)
- Renee XIV (1946)
- Without Lies (1946)
- Gala Suit (1949)
- The State Department Store (1953)

== Bibliography ==
- Hartmut Gagelmann. Nicolae Bretan, His Life, His Music, Volume 1. Pendragon Press, 2000.
