= Help, I'm an Heiress =

1937 film

- Directed by: Steve Sekely
- Written by: Ottó Indig; Miklós Lörincz; István Mihály
- Produced by: László Vincze
- Starring: Irén Ágay; Tivadar Uray; Piroska Vaszary
- Cinematography: Andor Vidor
- Edited by: József Szilas
- Music by: István Bástyai
- Production company: Globus Film
- Release date: 2 August 1937
- Running time: 93 minutes
- Country: Hungary
- Language: Hungarian

Help, I'm an Heiress (Hungarian: Segítség, örököltem!) is a 1937 Hungarian comedy film directed by Steve Sekely and starring Irén Ágay, Tivadar Uray and Piroska Vaszary. It was shot at the Hunnia Studios. The film's sets were designed by the art director Márton Vincze.

== Cast ==
- Irén Ágay as Zsóka, Bartha lánya
- Tivadar Uray as István, báró
- Piroska Vaszary as Mari néni
- Gábor Rajnay as Dombay, ügyvéd
- Erzsi Simor as Grófné
- Gyula Gózon as Bartha, vidéki vendéglõs
- Vera Sennyei as Piri, komorna
- György Dénes as George, komornyik
- Ilona Eszterházy as Szepesi Lonci mûvésznõ
- László Földényi as Jean, komornyik
- Erzsi Raffay as Énekesnõ
- Árpád Lehotay as Gróf
- Károly Huszár as Fõszakács
- Sándor Pethes as A báró bohém barátja
- Annie Réthy as Marcsa, cselédlány a gróféknál
- Ferenc Pethes as Falusi tanító
- István Lontay as Fõszakács Bartháéknál
- István Dózsa as Pincér
- Gusztáv Vándory as Antikvárius
- Vilmos Lengyel as Személyzet Bartháéknál
- László Keleti as Ügynök
- József Berky as Pincér
- György Gonda as Postamester
- Károly Hajagos as statiszta a Balaton bárban
- György Hajnal as Portás a gróféknál
- József Mátray as Újságíró
- Géza Rónai as Föjegyzö
- Ferenc Szabó as Személyzet Bartháéknál
- Eszter Szilágyi Szabó as statiszta a Balaton bárban

== Bibliography ==
- Frey, David. Jews, Nazis and the Cinema of Hungary: The Tragedy of Success, 1929-1944. Bloomsbury Publishing, 2017.
- Juhász, István. Kincses magyar filmtár 1931-1944: az eredeti forgatókönyvből 1931 és 1944 között létrejött hazai mozgóképekről. Kráter, 2007.
- Rîpeanu, Bujor. (ed.) International Directory of Cinematographers, Set- and Costume Designers in Film: Hungary (from the beginnings to 1988). Saur, 1981.
