= The Students of Igló =

1935 film

- Directed by: István György
- Written by: Imre Farkas; Iván Siklósi
- Produced by: Rezsö Faragó
- Starring: Pál Jávor; Gyula Kabos; György Dénes
- Cinematography: László Schäffer
- Edited by: Viktor Bánky
- Music by: Imre Farkas; Dezsõ Horváth
- Production company: Eco Film
- Release date: 21 February 1935
- Running time: 100 minutes
- Country: Hungary
- Language: Hungarian

The Students of Igló (Hungarian: Iglói diákok) is a 1935 Hungarian musical film directed by István György and starring Pál Jávor, Gyula Kabos and György Dénes. It was shot at the Hunnia Studios in Budapest. The film's sets were designed by the art director István Szirontai Lhotka.

== Cast ==
- Pál Jávor as Pali
- Gyula Kabos as Odrobina János
- György Dénes as Szidon Ákos
- Gyula Gózon as Simák
- József Baróthy as Számtantanár
- József Berky as Cigányprímás
- Ilona Dajbukát as Gyémántné
- Marica Gervai as Éva
- Lajos Gárdonyi as Gyémánt Adolf
- László Keleti as Gyémánt Lipi
- Endre Kruppka as Pedellus
- József Lengyel as Tanár
- Lajos Márkus as Holéczy Pista
- Ferenc Pataki as Tornatanár
- Sándor Pethes as Logikatanár
- Mária Román as Zongorázó lány
- Annie Réthy as Ancsurka
- Éva Siklóssy as Klárika
- Irén Sitkey as Fruzsina
- Ferike Szalontai as Mariska
- Imre Toronyi as Petky
- Ferenc Vendrey as Tisztelendö
- László Z. Molnár as Tirtsák tanár úr

== Bibliography ==
- Cunningham, John. Hungarian Cinema: From Coffee House to Multiplex. Wallflower Press, 2004.
- Fowler, Catherine. Representing the Rural: Space, Place, and Identity in Films about the Land. Wayne State University Press, 2006.
- Juhász, István. Kincses magyar filmtár 1931-1944: az eredeti forgatókönyvből 1931 és 1944 között létrejött hazai mozgóképekről. Kráter, 2007.
- Rîpeanu, Bujor. (ed.) International Directory of Cinematographers, Set- and Costume Designers in Film: Hungary (from the beginnings to 1988). Saur, 1981.
