= Cornflower (film) =

1934 film

- Directed by: Steve Sekely
- Written by: Leslie Bush-Fekete; István Mihály
- Produced by: Ernő Gál
- Starring: Irén Ágay; Antal Páger; Lili Berky
- Cinematography: István Eiben
- Music by: Dezső Szenkár
- Production company: City Film
- Release date: 31 October 1934
- Running time: 81 minutes
- Country: Hungary
- Language: Hungarian

Cornflower (Hungarian: Búzavirág) is a 1934 Hungarian drama film directed by Steve Sekely and starring Irén Ágay, Antal Páger and Lili Berky. It was shot at the Hunnia Studios in Budapest. It was produced by City Film, a company originally formed with financing from the French film producer Adolphe Osso.

== Cast ==
- Irén Ágay as Viktus és Elli
- Antal Páger as Síró, János
- Lili Berky as Pólika, a dajka
- Mici Erdélyi as Kató
- Mariska Vízváry as Schultheiszné
- Kálmán Rózsahegyi as Péter
- György Nagy as Harsányi Béla
- Ilona Eszterházy as Lola
- Sándor Pethes as Tanító
- Márton Rátkai as Báró

== Bibliography ==
- Frey, David. Jews, Nazis and the Cinema of Hungary: The Tragedy of Success, 1929-1944. Bloomsbury Publishing, 2017.
- Juhász, István. Kincses magyar filmtár 1931-1944: az eredeti forgatókönyvből 1931 és 1944 között létrejött hazai mozgóképekről. Kráter, 2007.
- Parish, James Robert & Pitts, Michael R. . Film Directors: A Guide to their American Films. Scarecrow Press, 1974.
- Rîpeanu, Bujor. (ed.) International Directory of Cinematographers, Set- and Costume Designers in Film: Hungary (from the beginnings to 1988). Saur, 1981.
