= Thanks for Knocking Me Down =

1935 Hungarian film

- Directed by: Emil Martonffy
- Written by: Imre Füredi; Károly Nóti
- Produced by: László Sas
- Starring: Ida Turay; Pál Jávor; Antal Páger
- Cinematography: István Eiben
- Edited by: Zoltán Farkas
- Music by: Sándor Szlatinay
- Production company: Hermes Film
- Release date: 14 March 1935
- Running time: 88 minutes
- Country: Hungary
- Language: Hungarian

Thanks for Knocking Me Down (Hungarian: Köszönöm, hogy elgázolt) is a 1935 Hungarian romantic comedy film directed by Emil Martonffy and starring Ida Turay, Pál Jávor and Antal Páger. It was shot at the Hunnia Studios in Budapest. The film's sets were designed by the art director Márton Vincze.

== Synopsis ==
When Sándor Balázs goes for a drive in the countryside, his car is taken by out-of-work singer Peter who then proceeds to knock down Panni who is bored with life in the village and yearns for something exciting to happen. This launches her on a fulfilling adventure involving romance and mistaken identity and concludes with her moving to Budapest.

== Cast ==
- Ida Turay as Galambos Panni
- Pál Jávor as Dr. Balázs Sándor
- Antal Páger as Asztalos Péter
- Mici Erdélyi as Terka
- Gyula Kabos as Ferenc
- Gyula Gózon as Galambos
- Gizi Lengyel as Szobalány vendége
- Béla Salamon as Detektív
- Sándor Pethes as Terka lovagja
- Ferenc Pethes as Terka lovagja
- Gusztáv Pártos as Terka lovagja
- Elvira Horváthy as Szakácsnö
- Piroska Kádár as Asztalos Péter barátnöje
- Annie Réthy as Julis
- Géza Rónai as Férfi

== Bibliography ==
- Biltereyst, Daniel, Maltby, Richard & Meers, Philippe (ed.) Cinema, Audiences and Modernity: New Perspectives on European Cinema History. Routledge, 2013.
- Juhász, István. Kincses magyar filmtár 1931–1944: az eredeti forgatókönyvből 1931 és 1944 között létrejött hazai mozgóképekről. Kráter, 2007.
- Rîpeanu, Bujor. (ed.) International Directory of Cinematographers, Set- and Costume Designers in Film: Hungary (from the beginnings to 1988). Saur, 1981.
- Vilmos, Várkonyi. Jávor Pál: és a magyar film aranykora. Zima Szabolcs, 2013
