= István Eiben =

Hungarian cinematographer

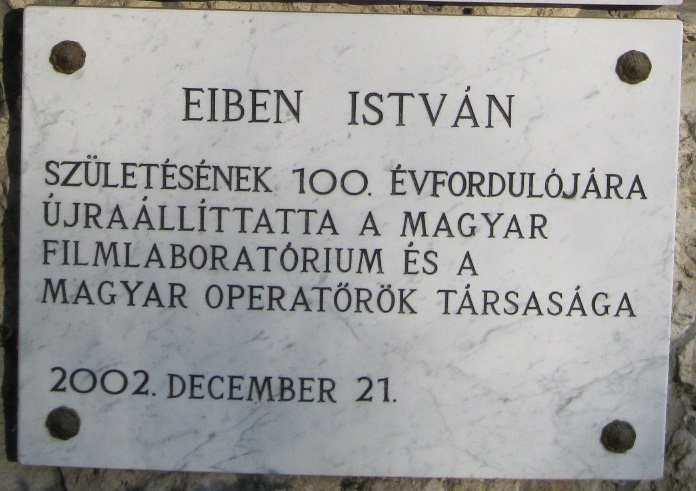
- Commemorative plaque to Eiben on Budakeszi Street No. 51 in the 2nd district of Budapest.
- Born: 21 December 1902; Budapest, Austria-Hungary
- Died: 23 October 1958 (aged 55); Budapest, Hungary
- Resting place: Farkasréti Cemetery
- Occupation: Cinematographer
- Years active: 1918–1955
- Awards: Meritorious Artist of Hungary (1953); Kossuth Prize (1955)

István Eiben (21 December 1902 – 23 October 1958) was a Hungarian cinematographer.

== Selected filmography ==
- Oliver Twist (1919)
- Number 111 (1919)
- Hyppolit, the Butler (1931)
- The Blue Idol (1931)
- The Old Scoundrel (1932)
- Kiss Me, Darling (1932)
- The Verdict of Lake Balaton (1932)
- Flying Gold (1932)
- Rouletabille the Aviator (1932)
- Miss Iza (1933)
- Judgment of Lake Balaton (1933)
- The Racokzi March (1933)
- The Ghost Train (1933)
- And the Plains Are Gleaming (1933)
- Romance in Budapest (1933)
- Scandal in Budapest (1933)
- Romance of Ida (1934)
- It Happened in March (1934)
- Purple Lilacs (1934)
- Cornflower (1934)
- Peter (1934)
- A Night in Venice (1934)
- Everything for the Woman (1934)
- Emmy (1934)
- Spring Parade (1934)
- Villa for Sale (1935)
- Budapest Pastry Shop (1935)
- Dream Love (1935)
- Dreams of Love (1935)
- The New Landlord (1935)
- Thanks for Knocking Me Down (1935)
- Ball at the Savoy (1935)
- Little Mother (1935)
- Half-Rate Honeymoon (1936)
- Be True Until Death (1936)
- The Golden Man (1936)
- It Was Me (1936)
- Anniversary (1936)
- Girls' Dormitory (1936)
- Fräulein Veronika (1936)
- Where the Lark Sings (1936)
- Mother (1937)
- Tales of Budapest (1937)
- Where Do We Sleep on Sunday? (1937)
- Sister Maria (1937)
- Family Bonus (1937)
- Sweet Revenge (1937)
- All Men Are Crazy (1937)
- Number 111 (1938)
- The Woman at the Crossroads (1938)
- Roxy and the Wonderteam (1938)
- Rézi Friday (1938)
- The Poor Rich (1938)
- Young Noszty and Mary Toth (1938)
- Billeting (1938)
- Magda Expelled (1938)
- Azurexpress (1938)
- Bence Uz (1938)
- Marika (1938)
- The Wrong Man (1938)
- Stars of Variety (1939)
- The Five-Forty (1939)
- The Ball Is On (1939)
- The Minister's Friend (1939)
- Wedding in Toprin (1939)
- Landslide (1940)
- Dankó Pista (1940)
- Haunting Spirit (1940)
- Yes or No? (1940)
- Mirage by the Lake (1940)
- Semmelweis (1940)
- A Bowl of Lentils (1941)
- Silenced Bells (1941)
- Prince Bob (1941)
- Flames (1941)
- Finally! (1941)
- One Night in Transylvania (1941)
- Silent Monastery (1941)
- Katyi (1942)
- Deadly Kiss (1942)
- Temptation (1942)
- Carnival of Love (1943)
- The White Train (1943)
- The Night Serenade (1943)
- The Song of Rákóczi (1943)
- Mask in Blue (1943)
- It Happened in Budapest (1944)
- African Bride (1944)
- After the Storm (1945)
- The Schoolmistress (1945)
- Without Lies (1946)
- Renee XIV (1946, uncompleted)
- The Siege of Beszterce (1948)
- Mickey Magnate (1949)
- Janika (1949)
- The Marriage of Katalin Kis (1950)
- Déryné (1951)
- Honesty and Glory (1951)
- Erkel (1952)
- West Zone (1952)
- The First Swallows (1953)
- Relatives (1954)
- Me and My Grandfather (1954)
- A Glass of Beer (1955)
- Dollar Daddy (1956)
- Suburban Legend (1957)
- Tale on the Twelve Points (1957)
- A Quiet Home (1958)
- Up the Slope (1959)

== Bibliography ==
- Cunningham, John. Hungarian Cinema: From Coffee House to Multiplex. Wallflower Press, 2004.
