= An Affair of Honour =

1937 film

- Directed by: Steve Sekely
- Written by: László Vadnay
- Based on: An Affair of Honour by Sándor Hunyady
- Produced by: Ernő Gál
- Starring: Zita Perczel; Imre Ráday; Gyula Kabos
- Cinematography: Károly Kurzmayer
- Edited by: György Feld
- Music by: Alfréd Márkus
- Production company: Allianz Film
- Release date: 11 February 1937
- Running time: 78 minutes
- Country: Hungary
- Language: Hungarian

An Affair of Honour (Hungarian: Lovagias ügy) is a 1937 Hungarian romantic comedy film directed by Steve Sekely and starring Zita Perczel, Imre Ráday and Gyula Kabos. It is based on the 1935 play of the same title by Sándor Hunyady. The film's sets were designed by the art director József Pán.

== Cast ==
- Zita Perczel as Baba
- Imre Ráday as Milkó Pál
- Gyula Kabos as Virág Andor
- Ella Gombaszögias Gizike
- Szeréna Sziklay as Virágné
- Gyula Gózon as Müller úr
- László Z. Molnár as Milkó vezérigazgató
- Margit Vágóné as Virág anyja
- Gerö Mály as Benjamino Borgelli
- Béla Salamon as Fekete úr
- Ilona Erdös as Gépírónö
- István Berend as Varga úr
- Lajos Ihász as Pataki úr
- László Keleti as Józsi
- István Dózsa as Feri
- István Lontay as Portás

== Bibliography ==
- Juhász, István. Kincses magyar filmtár 1931-1944: az eredeti forgatókönyvből 1931 és 1944 között létrejött hazai mozgóképekről. Kráter, 2007.
- Ostrowska, Dorota, Pitassio, Francesco & Varga, Zsuzsanna. Popular Cinemas in East Central Europe: Film Cultures and Histories. Bloomsbury Publishing, 2017.
- Rîpeanu, Bujor. (ed.) International Directory of Cinematographers, Set- and Costume Designers in Film: Hungary (from the beginnings to 1988). Saur, 1981.
- Somlyódy, László & Somlyódy, Nóra. Hungarian Arts and Sciences: 1848-2000. Social Science Monographs, 2003.
