= József Szilas =

Hungarian film editor

- Born: 25 December 1910 (age 115); Budapest, Austro-Hungarian Empire
- Occupation: Editor
- Years active: 1933–1939 (film)

József Szilas (born 1910) was a Hungarian film editor. He was active as an editor during the 1930s, working on films from a range of genres but particularly comedies. However, of Jewish heritage, the new anti-Jewish Laws prevented him from working in the cinema. His date of death is unknown, but he likely died while working as a forced labourer during the Holocaust.

== Selected filmography ==
- The Rakoczi March (1933)
- Emmy (1934)
- Romance of Ida (1934)
- Purple Lilacs (1934)
- Address Unknown (1935)
- Villa for Sale (1935)
- It Was Me (1936)
- Be True Until Death (1936)
- Sensation (1936)
- The Golden Man (1936)
- A Girl Sets Out (1936)
- Help, I'm an Heiress (1937)
- Tokay Rhapsody (1937)
- My Daughter Is Different (1937)
- I May See Her Once a Week (1937)
- Number 111 (1938)
- Süt a nap (1939)

== Bibliography ==
- Hagener, Malte & Hans, Jan. Als die Filme singen lernten: Innovation und Tradition im Musikfilm, 1928-1938. 1999.
