= Where Do We Sleep on Sunday? =

1937 film

- Directed by: Béla Pásztor
- Written by: Károly Nóti
- Produced by: Ferenc Bürger
- Starring: Ella Gombaszögi; Gyula Kabos; Kálmán Latabár
- Cinematography: István Eiben
- Edited by: László Bognár
- Music by: Imre Hajdú
- Production company: Bioscop Film
- Release date: 18 March 1937
- Running time: 60 minutes
- Country: Hungary
- Language: Hungarian

Where Do We Sleep on Sunday? (Hungarian: Hol alszunk vasárnap?) is a 1937 Hungarian comedy film directed by Béla Pásztor and starring Ella Gombaszögi, Gyula Kabos and Kálmán Latabár. It was shot at the Hunnia Studios in Budapest. The film's sets were designed by the art director Márton Vincze.

== Cast ==
- Ella Gombaszögi as Kelemenné
- Gyula Kabos as Virág Benö
- Kálmán Latabár as Kelemen Géza
- Éva Bíró as Gépírókisasszony
- Manyi Kiss as Juli
- Vilmos Komlós as Ladányi Hugó
- Anni Soltész as Etelka
- Géza Szilágyi as Szolga
- Gizi Sárosi as Elvira
- János Balassa as Irodaszolga

== Bibliography ==
- Juhász, István. Kincses magyar filmtár 1931-1944: az eredeti forgatókönyvből 1931 és 1944 között létrejött hazai mozgóképekről. Kráter, 2007.
- Rîpeanu, Bujor. (ed.) International Directory of Cinematographers, Set- and Costume Designers in Film: Hungary (from the beginnings to 1988). Saur, 1981.
