= Sweet Revenge (1937 film) =

1937 film

- Directed by: Johann von Vásáry
- Written by: János Vaszary
- Produced by: Gyula Trebitsch
- Starring: Mici Erdélyi; Antal Páger; Imre Ráday
- Cinematography: István Eiben
- Edited by: Ferenc Vincze
- Music by: Imre Hajdú
- Production company: Objektív Film
- Release date: 16 September 1937
- Running time: 79 minutes
- Country: Hungary
- Language: Hungarian

Sweet Revenge (Hungarian: Édes a bosszú) is a 1937 Hungarian comedy drama film directed by Johann von Vásáry and starring Mici Erdélyi, Antal Páger and Imre Ráday. The film's sets were designed by the art director Márton Vincze.

== Cast ==
- Mici Erdélyi as Evelin
- Antal Páger as Walter Ákos
- Imre Ráday as Péter
- Piroska Vaszary as Madame Fleury, French lady's companion
- Júlia Komár as Márta, Evelin's friend
- Márton Rátkai as Hermann, stock commission agent
- Margit Ladomerszky as Mrs. Herman
- Vera Sennyei as Eliz, Hermann's daughter
- Tivadar Bilicsi as Peregi, banker
- Anikó Vörös as Singer
- László Z. Molnár as Dr. Horváth, lawyer
- József Barna as Man on exchange floor
- Éva Bíró as Boarding school girl
- István Dózsa as Branch director
- Károly Hajagos as St. a szálloda éttermében
- Izabella Kökény as Boarding school girl
- István Lontay as Bank clerk
- Marika Lányi as Boarding school girl
- Dezsõ Pártos as Hall porter
- Györgyi Simon as Boarding school girl
- Éva Telbisz as Boarding school girl
- Géza Berczy as Young man on exchange floor
- Irén Sitkey as Schoolmistress
- Gusztáv Vándory as Hotel restaurant waiter

== Bibliography ==
- Juhász, István. Kincses magyar filmtár 1931-1944: az eredeti forgatókönyvből 1931 és 1944 között létrejött hazai mozgóképekről. Kráter, 2007.
- Rîpeanu, Bujor. (ed.) International Directory of Cinematographers, Set- and Costume Designers in Film: Hungary (from the beginnings to 1988). Saur, 1981.
