= Black Diamonds (1938 film) =

1938 film by Ladislao Vajda

- Directed by: Ladislao Vajda
- Written by: Mór Jókai (novel); István Mihály; Attila Orbók
- Produced by: Lajos Hirsch; Imre Tsuk
- Starring: Zita Szeleczky; Zoltán Greguss; Valéria Hidvéghy
- Cinematography: Károly Kurzmayer
- Edited by: Zoltán Farkas
- Music by: Lajos Ákom
- Production companies: Hirsch and Tsuk; Magyar Film Iroda
- Release date: 14 April 1938
- Running time: 90 minutes
- Country: Hungary
- Language: Hungarian

Black Diamonds (Hungarian: Fekete gyémántok) is a 1938 Hungarian drama film directed by Ladislao Vajda and starring Zita Szeleczky, Zoltán Greguss and Valéria Hidvéghy. It is based on an 1870 novel of the same name by Mór Jókai, the title referring to coal. It was remade in 1977.

The film's sets were designed by the art director József Pán.

== Cast ==
- Zita Szeleczky as Evila
- Zoltán Greguss as Szaffrán Péter - Evila võlegénye
- Valéria Hidvéghy as Marica - bányászlány
- Gyula Csortos as Sondersheim herceg
- Pál Jávor as Berend Iván
- László Kemény as Bányász
- Gerö Mály as Spitzhase
- László Misoga as Bányász
- Kálmán Rózsahegyi as Pali bácsi
- Gyula Szöreghy as Kocsmáros
- Jenö Törzs as Kaulmann Félix, bankár
- Zoltán Várkonyi as Bányász

== Bibliography ==
- Judson Rozenblit. Constructing Nationalities in East Central Europe. Berghahn Books, 2005.
