= Viki (film) =

1937 film

- Directed by: Márton Keleti
- Written by: Adorján Bónyi; Károly Nóti
- Produced by: Ernő Gál
- Starring: Rosy Barsony; Pál Jávor; Gyula Kabos
- Cinematography: Károly Kurzmayer
- Edited by: György Feld
- Music by: Paul Abraham
- Production company: Kino Filmipari és Filmkereskedelmi
- Release date: 9 November 1937
- Running time: 70 minutes
- Country: Hungary
- Language: Hungarian

Viki is a 1937 Hungarian historical comedy film directed by Márton Keleti and starring Rosy Barsony, Pál Jávor and Gyula Kabos. The film's sets were designed by the art director István Szirontai Lhotka. It is based on the 1935 operetta of the same title composed by Paul Abraham.

== Cast ==
- Rosy Barsony as Hadházy Viki
- Pál Jávor as Feri
- Gyula Kabos as Dr. Weiss
- Gyula Csortos as Hadházy Máté
- Kálmán Rózsahegyi as Zsiga bácsi
- Gerö Mály as Dr. Varga Sebestyén
- Lili Berky as Zsuzsa
- Manyi Kiss as Füzessy Lili
- Attila Petheö as Kont István fõispán
- György Nagy as Feri párbajsegédje
- István Berend as Viki párbajsegédje
- Zoltán Makláry as Szabó György örmester
- István Dózsa as Pincér
- Ilona Erdös as Szobalány
- Béla Fáy as Viki párbajsergédje
- Márta Fónay as Hadházyék cselédlánya
- Menyhért Gulyás as Vendég a megyebálon
- Lajos Gárday as Péter
- Andor Heltai as Cigányprímás
- Miklós Pataki as Feri párbajsegédje
- Sándor Peti as Fõpincér
- Géza Rónai as Hadházy barátja
- Rudolf Somogyvári as Kálmán
- Gyula Szöreghy as Hajdú
- Karola Zala as Kont felesége

== Bibliography ==
- Cunningham, John. Hungarian Cinema: From Coffee House to Multiplex. Wallflower Press, 2004.
- Juhász, István. Kincses magyar filmtár 1931-1944: az eredeti forgatókönyvből 1931 és 1944 között létrejött hazai mozgóképekről. Kráter, 2007.
- Rîpeanu, Bujor. (ed.) International Directory of Cinematographers, Set- and Costume Designers in Film: Hungary (from the beginnings to 1988). Saur, 1981.
