= Imre Toronyi =

Hungarian actor

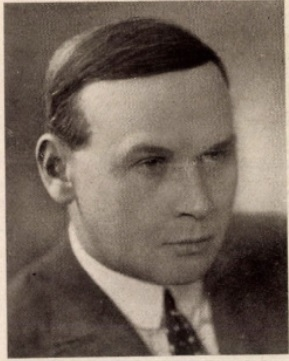
- Toronyi in 1931.
- Born: 17 October 1888; Szekszárd, Austro-Hungarian Empire
- Died: 16 October 1952 (aged 64); Budapest, Hungary
- Other name: Imre L. Toronyi
- Occupation: Actor
- Years active: 1935–1947 (film)

Imre Toronyi (1888–1952) was a Hungarian stage and film actor. A character actor, he appeared in a number of supporting roles in Hungarian cinema of the 1930s and 1940s. He featured in the 1942 neorealist film People of the Mountains.

== Selected filmography ==
- The Students of Igloi (1935)
- The Empress and the Hussar (1935)
- Anniversary (1936)
- Hungary's Revival (1939)
- The Ball Is On (1939)
- Gül Baba (1940)
- Queen Elizabeth (1940)
- You Are the Song (1940)
- Property for Sale (1941)
- Let's Love Each Other (1941)
- Silent Monastery (1941)
- Sister Beáta (1941)
- Male Fidelity (1942)
- Guard House Number 5 (1942)
- At the Crossroads (1942)
- People of the Mountains (1942)
- The Dance of Death (1942)
- The Marsh Flower (1943)
- Suburban Guard Post (1943)
- The Song of Rákóczi (1943)
- Eva Szovathy (1944)

== Bibliography ==
- Hames, Peter. The Cinema Of Central Europe. Wallflower Press, 2004. p. 248.
- Nemeskürty, István & Szántó, Tibor. A Pictorial Guide to the Hungarian Cinema, 1901-1984. Helikon, 1985.
- Petrucci, Antonio. Twenty Years of Cinema in Venice. International Exhibition of Cinematographic Art, 1952.
