= Annamária =

1943 film

- Directed by: Dezső Ákos Hamza
- Written by: Gréta Harsányi
- Produced by: Géza Matolay
- Starring: Gábor Rajnay; Éva Szörényi; László Szilassy
- Cinematography: Rudolf Icsey
- Edited by: Mária Vály
- Music by: Lajos Ákom
- Production company: Magyar Írók Filmje
- Release date: 11 February 1943
- Running time: 84 minutes
- Country: Hungary
- Language: Hungarian

Annamária is a 1943 Hungarian comedy film directed by Dezső Ákos Hamza and starring Gábor Rajnay, Éva Szörényi and László Szilassy. It was filmed at the Hunnia Studios in Budapest. The film's sets were designed by the art director Klára B. Kokas. Location shooting took place around Kaposvár.

== Cast ==
- Gábor Rajnay as Füzessy Gábor, földbirtokos
- Éva Szörényi as Annamária - Füzessy lánya
- László Szilassy as Balázs Géza, mérnök
- Mariska Vízváry as Anna néni
- Sándor Pethes as Jimmy
- János Makláry as Tommy
- Nusi Somogyi as Boris - házvezetõnõ
- Ferenc Pethes as Feri
- Vilma Medgyaszay as Matild néni
- Erzsi Salamon as Lili
- Beáta Barkóczy as Babszi
- Dóra Fáy Kiss as Titkárnõ
- Lajos Gárday as Halõr
- Sándor Hidassy as Gazda
- Lajos Kelemen as Gazda
- Jenö Danis as Gazda
- Rezsõ Acsay as Gazda
- Imre Tóth as Gazda
- Gusztáv Vándory as Alispán
- László Misogaas Postás
- Dénes Klimsa as Vasutas

== Bibliography ==
- Juhász, István. Kincses magyar filmtár 1931-1944: az eredeti forgatókönyvből 1931 és 1944 között létrejött hazai mozgóképekről. Kráter, 2007.
- Rîpeanu, Bujor. (ed.) International Directory of Cinematographers, Set- and Costume Designers in Film: Hungary (from the beginnings to 1988). Saur, 1981.
