= Billeting (film) =

1938 film

- Directed by: Sándor Szlatinay
- Written by: Károly Aszlányi; Károly Nóti
- Produced by: Richárd Horovitz
- Starring: Antal Páger; Zita Szeleczky; Gyula Kabos
- Cinematography: István Eiben
- Music by: Sándor Szlatinay
- Production company: Mûvész Film
- Release date: 2 November 1938
- Running time: 82 minutes
- Country: Hungary
- Language: Hungarian

Billeting (Hungarian: Beszállásolás) is a 1938 Hungarian musical film directed by Sándor Szlatinay and starring Antal Páger, Zita Szeleczky and Gyula Kabos. It was made at the Hunnia Studios in Budapest. The film's sets were designed by the art director Márton Vincze. Location shooting took place around Kenderes, the birthplace of the Regent of Hungary Miklós Horthy.

== Cast ==
- Antal Páger as Dr. Tibor Tibor
- Zita Szeleczky as Takács Ágnes
- Gyula Kabos as Kulcsár úr
- Tivadar Bilicsi as Obitz Tibor
- Manyi Kiss as Buchbinder Rózsi
- Ferenc Pethes as Ifj. Árkossy Ádám
- Sándor Pethes as Árkossy apja
- Gábor Rajnay as Takács Ferenc
- Mariska Vízváry as Emma néni
- Karola Zala as Takácsné

== Bibliography ==
- Juhász, István. Kincses magyar filmtár 1931-1944: az eredeti forgatókönyvből 1931 és 1944 között létrejött hazai mozgóképekről. Kráter, 2007.
- Rîpeanu, Bujor. (ed.) International Directory of Cinematographers, Set- and Costume Designers in Film: Hungary (from the beginnings to 1988). Saur, 1981.
