= The Fabulous Suzanne =

1946 film by Steve Sekely

- Directed by: Steve Sekely
- Written by: William Bowers; Tedwell Chapman; Randall Faye
- Produced by: Steve Sekely
- Starring: Barbara Britton; Rudy Vallee; Otto Kruger; William Henry
- Cinematography: Henry Sharp
- Edited by: John Hoffman
- Music by: Arthur Lange
- Production company: Star Pictures
- Distributed by: Republic Pictures
- Release date: December 15, 1946
- Running time: 71 minutes
- Country: United States
- Language: English

The Fabulous Suzanne is a 1946 American romantic comedy film directed by Steve Sekely and starring Barbara Britton, Rudy Vallee and Otto Kruger. A waitress inherits a fortune from one of her customers.

== Plot ==
The young and beautiful Suzanne O'Neill works as a waitress in her fiancé William "Bill" Harris's diner. Suzanne's problem is that Bill doesn't want to decide on a wedding date. He claims that he doesn't have enough money to get married; he wants to be able to support her on his own first, so that she doesn't have to work at all. But Suzanne gets tired of Bill's pride getting in the way of her dreams for the future. Suzanne starts betting on horse races, using her "lucky pin" to pick the right ones for the infamous and not always apt gambler Jonathan Tuttle. When Tuttle passes away shortly after their enterprise has taken off, Suzanne finds out that he has left her seven thousand dollars through his will. She is more than surprised, since he wasn't that successful in his gambling. Suzanne takes the money to Bill, offering him to use them to scale up his business, but once again his pride comes in the way. She decides to leave Bill, returns the engagement ring, and leaves for New York to try her own wings of fortune.

Her lucky pin continues to prove itself useful when she manages to pick a very profitable stock at one of the city's reputable investment corporations: Hendrick Courtney, Sr. and Sons. The firms manager, Hendrick 'Hank' Courtney Jr. is baffled by her performance, and lets her go on picking several more stocks to see where she lands. It runs out she is more than lucky and she makes the firm a neat load of cash in a very short span of time.

Both the gloomy Hank and his more outgoing, easier younger brother Rex fall in love with Suzanne. She is overwhelmed by the attention and starts dating both brothers, even if she can't forget her previous fiancé Bill. She arranges, with the help of one of the brothers, that some of her money is sent to Bill, disguised as an inheritance from an aunt. Without struggling with his pride, Bill invests the money in a new and bigger diner, and he is ready to try to win back his lost love Suzanne. Another waitress of his has taken an interest in him and tries to convince him to give up waiting for Suzanne, and choose her instead.

Suzanne finds herself now being courted also by the two brothers' father, who has fallen for the charming former waitress head over heels. Despite this she manages to sneak away and come to the opening of Bill's new diner. She is hoping to talk her way back into Bill's life, but the rivaling waitress spills vicious lies into her ears, saying that she and Bill are now engaged to be married. Devastated by these news just leaves Bill a note and leaves the opening without meeting him. When Bill reads the note he immediately goes to New York to reconcile with his love and tell her the truth.

Bill finds his love in New York and they have a long talk during a Central Park coach ride, and it seems the couple will be able to let bygones be bygones. Upon the return to her apartment though, they bump into all three of the love-struck Courtneys. Bill is outraged and leaves Suzanne alone with the three men. After being abandoned by Bill, Suzanne decides to accept marrying one of the brother's, but without saying which one. On the wedding day, both brothers are left by the altar, and it turns out that Suzanne has been hijacked by their father. He has realised that Suzanne doesn't want to marry either of his sons, and takes her on a trip to look for Bill, in an effort to join them once and for all. When they arrive back to the small town they find that Bill has left the diner and all hope of reconciliation seems lost - until they discover that there is a re-opening of the old diner in progress, and Suzanne convince Bill to taker her back, with a little help from her lucky pin.

== Cast ==
- Barbara Britton as Suzanne
- Rudy Vallee as Hendrick Courtney Jr.
- Otto Kruger as Hendrick Courtney Sr.
- Richard Denning as Rex
- William Henry as William Harris
- Veda Ann Borg as Mary
- Grady Sutton as Marstenson
- Irén Ágay as Ginette
- Frank Darien as Mr. Tuttle
- Harry Tyler as Lawyer
- Alvin Hammer as Little Man
- Herbert Evans as Butler

== Bibliography ==
- Hanson, Patricia A. & Dunkleberger, Amy. Afi: American Film Institute Catalog of Motion Pictures Produced in the United States : Feature Films 1941-1950 Indexes, Volume 2. University of California Press, 1999.
