= Gábor Rajnay =

Hungarian actor (1895–1961)

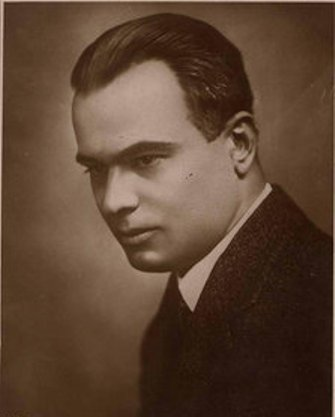
Gábor Rajnai

Gábor Rajnay (born Gábor Rezső Árpád György Uros Imre Joanovics; 11 May 1895 – 10 July 1961) was a Hungarian film actor.

== Selected filmography ==
- The Officer's Swordknot (1915)
- Faun (1918)
- Number 111 (1919)
- Yamata (1919)
- Ave Caesar! (1919)
- Man of Gold (1919)
- Emmy (1934)
- Romance of Ida (1934)
- Three Dragons (1936)
- Harvest (1936)
- Anniversary (1936)
- The Borrowed Castle (1937)
- My Daughter Is Different (1937)
- Beauty of the Pusta (1937)
- Help, I'm an Heiress (1937)
- Rézi Friday (1938)
- Two Prisoners (1938)
- Billeting (1938)
- Number 111 (1938)
- Young Noszty and Mary Toth (1938)
- Mirage by the Lake (1940)
- The Unquiet Night (1940)
- Queen Elizabeth (1940)
- The Gyurkovics Boys (1941)
- Prince Bob (1941)
- Entry Forbidden (1941)
- Annamária (1942)
- Deadly Kiss (1942)
- Dr. Kovács István (1942)
- Cadet Love (1942)
- Annamária (1943)
- Mouse in the Palace (1943)
- It Begins with Marriage (1943)
- It Happened in Budapest (1944)
- Boy or Girl? (1944)
- The Siege of Beszterce (1948)
- Janika (1949)
- Hot Fields (1949)
- A Strange Marriage (1951)
- Déryné (1951)
- Erkel (1952)
- Young Hearts (1953)
- Relatives (1954)
- Me and My Grandfather (1954)
- Fourteen Lives (1954)
- Accident (1955)
- Springtime in Budapest (1955)
- Liliomfi (1956)
- Summer Clouds (1957)
- The Football Star (1957)
- At Midnight (1957)
