= Miss President =

1935 film

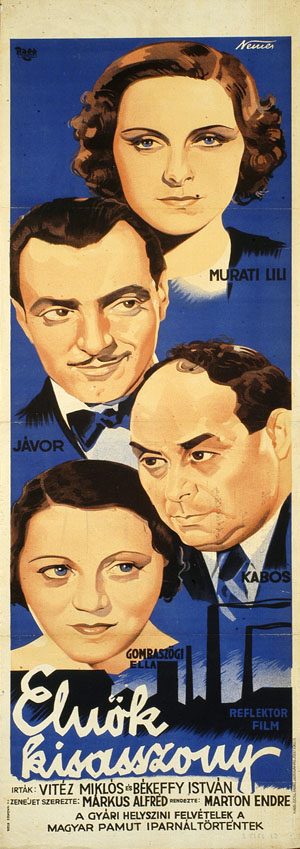
- Directed by: Andrew Marton
- Written by: István Békeffy; Miklós Vitéz
- Produced by: Mrs. Miklós Vitéz
- Starring: Lili Muráti; Pál Jávor; Gyula Kabos
- Cinematography: Heinrich Balasch
- Music by: Alfréd Márkus
- Production companies: Hunnia Filmstúdió; Reflektor Film
- Release date: 25 November 1935
- Running time: 98 minutes
- Country: Hungary
- Language: Hungarian

Miss President (Hungarian: Elnökkisasszony) is a 1935 Hungarian comedy film directed by Andrew Marton and starring Lili Muráti, Pál Jávor and Gyula Kabos. It was shot at the Hunnia Studios in Budapest. The film's sets were designed by the art director Márton Vincze.

== Synopsis ==
Zsuzsa inherits a Budapest textile factory from her father and takes over is management. She has to overcome scepticism about her ability to run the business and fend off the unwelcome advances of the factory foreman. To do this she creates a fictitious fiancée, only for a new engineer to arrive strongly resembling her creation.

== Cast ==
- Lili Muráti as Várkonyi Zsuzsa
- Pál Jávor as Török István
- Ella Gombaszögi as Berta
- Gyula Kabos as Vas Ödön
- Jenö Törzs as Kollár
- Márta Nádai as Kató
- Sándor Pethes as Gáldy Péter
- Gusztáv Pártos as Mr. White
- Andor Sárossy as Gonda Károly
- Kálmán Zátony as Bamberger Ferenc
- Géza Rónai as Titkár
- Elemér Baló as Pincér
- József Lengyel as Kaszinójátékos
- Tibor Puskás as ifj. Török István
- Miklós Sebõ as Énekes

== Bibliography ==
- Ostrowska, Dorota, Pitassio, Francesco & Varga, Zsuzsanna. Popular Cinemas in East Central Europe: Film Cultures and Histories. Bloomsbury Publishing, 2017.
