= Dream Love =

1935 film

- Directed by: Heinz Hille
- Written by: Heinz Hille; Tivadar Lándor
- Produced by: Sándor Verõ
- Starring: Ferenc Táray; Mária Sulyok; Giza Báthory
- Cinematography: István Eiben
- Edited by: Viktor Bánky
- Music by: Ernst Erich Buder
- Production company: Attila Film
- Release date: 11 September 1935
- Running time: 103 minutes
- Country: Hungary
- Language: Hungarian

Dream Love (Hungarian: Szerelmi álmok) is a 1935 Hungarian historical romantic drama film directed by Heinz Hille and starring Ferenc Táray, Mária Sulyok and Giza Báthory. It was shot at the Hunnia Studios in Budapest and on location in Tata. The film's sets were designed by the art director Márton Vincze. It premiered at the Venice Film Festival in August before going on general release in Hungary the following month. A separate German version Dreams of Love was also produced.

== Synopsis ==
A young countess runs away from her fiancée to become a pupil of a piano teacher, the composer Franz Liszt.

== Cast ==
- Ferenc Táray as Liszt Ferenc
- Mária Sulyok as Mária, Duday lánya
- Giza Báthory as Madeleine, Duday felesége
- László Z. Molnár as Gróf Duday Imre
- Béla Fáy as Hans Wendland
- Géza Földessy as Eötvös Kálmán báró
- György Dénes as Usla kapitány
- Karola Zala as Duday Mária nagymamája
- József Kürthy as Pekry báró
- Tibor Halmay as Péter, Liszt tanítványa
- Gyula Gózon as Kovács János
- Sándor Pethes as Spiridon, Liszt mindenese
- Eszter Rethy as Operaénekesnö
- Ferenc Bókay as Pali, tisztiszolga
- Rezsö Harsányi as Ezredes
- Ferenc Pázmán as Vendég a koncerten
- Ákos Ráthonyi as Tanítvány
- Elemér Baló as Hangversenymester
- József Barna as vendéglõs Weimarban
- Géza Berczy as Liszt Ferenc egyik tanítványa
- Harry Csáktornyai as Eötvös báró barátja
- Géza Palásthy as Statiszta

== Bibliography ==
- Cunningham, John. Hungarian Cinema: From Coffee House to Multiplex. Wallflower Press, 2004.
- Juhász, István. Kincses magyar filmtár 1931-1944: az eredeti forgatókönyvből 1931 és 1944 között létrejött hazai mozgóképekről. Kráter, 2007.
- Rîpeanu, Bujor. (ed.) International Directory of Cinematographers, Set- and Costume Designers in Film: Hungary (from the beginnings to 1988). Saur, 1981.
