= Two Prisoners =

1938 film

- Directed by: Steve Sekely
- Written by: Lajos Zilahy
- Based on: Two Prisoners by Lajos Zilahy
- Produced by: Ernő Gál
- Starring: Gizi Bajor; Pál Jávor; Irén Ágay
- Cinematography: Károly Kurzmayer
- Edited by: György Feld
- Music by: Lajos Ákom
- Production company: Rex Film
- Release date: 6 January 1938
- Running time: 81 minutes
- Country: Hungary
- Language: Hungarian

Two Prisoners (Hungarian: Két fogoly) is a 1938 Hungarian war drama film directed by Steve Sekely and starring Gizi Bajor, Pál Jávor and Irén Ágay. It was shot at the Hunnia Studios in Budapest. The film's sets were designed by the art director Lajos Pán. Lajos Zilahy adapted the screenplay from his own novel of the same title.

== Cast ==
- Gizi Bajor as Almády Miett
- Pál Jávor as dr. Takács Péter
- Irén Ágay as Zinajda
- Gábor Rajnay as Golgonszky Iván
- Gyula Csortos as Almády
- Rózsa Ignácz as Olga
- Mária Keresztessy as Aranka
- Marcsa Simon as Milly
- Margit Vágóné as Takács Péter anyja
- László Földényi as Tiszt
- Elemér Baló as katonaorvos Oroszországban
- István Berend as Közkatona
- Tivadar Bilicsi as Hazatérõ katona
- Lajos Gárday as Sofõr
- Lajos Köpeczi Boócz as Katonaorvos
- József Kürthy as Orosz utas a vonaton
- Margit Ladomerszky as Iljina
- Zoltán Makláry as Zamárd
- Béla Mihályffi as Tiszt
- György Nagy as Zamák, hadifogoly
- Sándor Pethes as Tiszt
- Rudolf Somogyvári as Janika
- Lajos Vértes as Ádám Miska
- Karola Zala as Vendég a teán
- Kálmán Zátony as Fogadóbizottsági katona
- István Dózsa as Hadifogoly
- Ferenc Hoykó as Táncoló statiszta az estélyen
- Gyözö Kabók as Szerzetes
- Ibolya Orbán as Statiszta az estélyen
- Ferenc Pataki as Fogadóbizottsági tag
- Dezsõ Pártos as Vendég a teadélutánon
- Teri Radó as Statiszta az estélyen
- Lajos Ujváry as Hadifogoly

== Bibliography ==
- Juhász, István. Kincses magyar filmtár 1931–1944: az eredeti forgatókönyvből 1931 és 1944 között létrejött hazai mozgóképekről. Kráter, 2007.
- Parish, James Robert & Pitts, Michael R. Film directors: a guide to their American films. Scarecrow Press, 1974.
- Rîpeanu, Bujor. (ed.) International Directory of Cinematographers, Set- and Costume Designers in Film: Hungary (from the beginnings to 1988). Saur, 1981.
