= Karl Kurzmayer =

Austrian cinematographer

- Born: 28 November 1901; Vienna, Austro-Hungarian Empire
- Died: 24 January 1972 (aged 70); Vienna, Austria
- Occupation: Cinematographer
- Years active: 1933-1955 (film)

Karl Kurzmayer or Károly Kurzmayer (1901–1972) was an Austrian cinematographer. During the Second World War he was employed on a number of Wien Film productions.

== Selected filmography ==
- Immortal Melodies (1935)
- Hannerl and Her Lovers (1936)
- The Man Under the Bridge (1936)
- Danube Rendezvous (1936)
- Sensation (1936)
- Three Dragons (1936)
- Beauty of the Pusta (1937)
- An Affair of Honour (1937)
- Viki (1937)
- Lady Seeks a Room (1937)
- Barbara in America (1938)
- Two Prisoners (1938)
- Black Diamonds (1938)
- Anton the Last (1939)
- Janos the Valiant (1939)
- Seven Years Hard Luck (1940)
- The Fall of Valentin (1951)
- The Poacher (1953)
- Sun Over the Adriatic (1954)
- Let the Sun Shine Again (1955)
- The Inn on the Lahn (1955)
- Goetz von Berlichingen (1955)

== Bibliography ==
- Fritsche, Maria. Homemade Men in Postwar Austrian Cinema: Nationhood, Genre and Masculinity. Berghahn Books, 2013.
- Von Dassanowsky, Robert. Austrian Cinema: A History. McFarland, 2005.
