= Janika (film) =

1949 film

- Directed by: Márton Keleti
- Written by: István Békeffy (play); Adorján Stella (play)
- Starring: Ida Turay; Sándor Szabó; Mária Mezei; Gyula Gózon
- Cinematography: István Eiben
- Edited by: Sándor Zákonyi
- Music by: Tamás Bródy
- Production company: Magyar Filmgyártó Nemzeti Vállalat
- Release date: 19 May 1949
- Running time: 80 minutes
- Country: Hungary
- Language: Hungarian

Janika is a 1949 Hungarian comedy film directed by Márton Keleti and starring Ida Turay, Sándor Szabó and Mária Mezei. It is based on a play by István Békeffy.

== Cast ==
- Ida Turay as Gizi / Janika
- Sándor Szabó as Balla János
- Mária Mezei as Daisy
- Gyula Gózon as Edus bácsi
- Hilda Gobbi as Malvin
- László Kemény as Adorján
- Edit Hlatky as Vera
- Ella Gombaszögi as Gizi mamája
- Vilmos Komlós as Házmester
- Gábor Rajnay as Gizi papája
- Kálmán Latabár as Fenek Jenõ
- Márta Fónay as Bözsike
- Gyula Justh as Szállodaportás
- László Keleti as Pincér
- Sándor Kömíves
