= Andor Sárossy =

Hungarian actor (1885–1967)

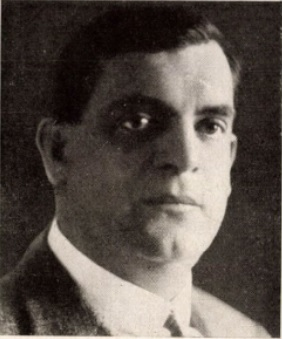
- Sárossy in 1931.
- Born: 16 December 1885; Budapest, Austro-Hungarian Empire
- Died: 26 November 1967 (aged 81); Budapest, Hungary
- Occupation: Actor
- Years active: 1921–1959 (film)

Andor Sárossy (1885–1967) was a Hungarian singer and stage and film actor. He appeared in supporting roles in a number of Hungarian films of the 1930s and 1940s.

== Selected filmography ==
- Mackó úr kalandjai (1921)
- The Blue Idol (1931)
- Hyppolit, the Butler (1931)
- Kiss Me, Darling (1932)
- Everything for the Woman (1934)
- Romance of Ida (1934)
- Miss President (1935)
- Cafe Moscow (1936)
- Pat und Patachon im Paradies (1937)
- Much Ado About Emmi (1940)
- Dankó Pista (1940)
- Seven Plum Trees (1940)
- The Gyurkovics Boys (1941)
- Left-handed Angel (1941)
- The Marriage Market (1941)
- We'll Know By Midnight (1942)
- Midnight Waltz (1944)
- A Plane Has Not Returned (1944)
- Muki (1944)
- After the Storm (1945)

== Bibliography ==
- Klaus, Ulrich J. Deutsche Tonfilme: Jahrgang 1937. Klaus-Archiv, 1988.
- Székely, György & Gajdó, Tamás. Magyar színháztörténet: 1873–1920. Akadémiai Kiadó, 1990
