= Danube Rendezvous =

1936 film

- Directed by: Steve Sekely
- Written by: Károly Nóti
- Produced by: Adolf Fodor; Berci Fodor; Ernő Gál
- Starring: Zita Perczel; Imre Ráday; Gyula Csortos
- Cinematography: Karl Kurzmayer
- Edited by: György Feld
- Music by: Imre Hajdú
- Production company: Phõbus Film
- Release date: 23 December 1936
- Running time: 65 minutes
- Country: Hungary
- Language: Hungarian

Danube Rendezvous (Hungarian: Dunaparti randevú) is a 1936 Hungarian romantic comedy film directed by Steve Sekely and starring Zita Perczel, Imre Ráday and Gyula Csortos. It was shot at the Hunnia Studios in Budapest. The film's sets were designed by the art director József Pán.

== Cast ==
- Zita Perczel as Tamássy Erzsi
- Imre Ráday as Bodó István
- Lici Balla as Blazsek Bella
- Gyula Csortos as Tamássy Sándor
- Livia Dobai as Énekesnö
- Gyula Kabos as Szalai
- Szeréna Sziklay as Blazsek mama
- Lili Berky as Veronka
- Lajos Gárdonyi as Bellák
- István Berend as Dr. Demeter
- Gyula Tapolczay as Dr. Demeter

== Bibliography ==
- Frey, David. Jews, Nazis and the Cinema of Hungary: The Tragedy of Success, 1929-1944. Bloomsbury Publishing, 2017.
- Juhász, István. Kincses magyar filmtár 1931-1944: az eredeti forgatókönyvből 1931 és 1944 között létrejött hazai mozgóképekről. Kráter, 2007.
- Rîpeanu, Bujor. (ed.) International Directory of Cinematographers, Set- and Costume Designers in Film: Hungary (from the beginnings to 1988). Saur, 1981.
