= Ella Gombaszögi =

Hungarian actress (1894–1951)

- Born: Erzsébet Grün; December 27, 1894; Budapest, Kingdom of Hungary, Transleithania, Austria-Hungary
- Died: November 12, 1951 (aged 56); Budapest, Hungarian People's Republic
- Burial place: Fiume Road Graveyard
- Education: Academy of Drama and Film in Budapest (1913)
- Occupation: Actress
- Years active: 1913–1951
- Spouse: Pál Nágel (married 1888)

Ella Gombaszögi (born Erzsébet Grün; 27 December 1894 – 12 November 1951) was a Hungarian actress.

== Selected filmography ==
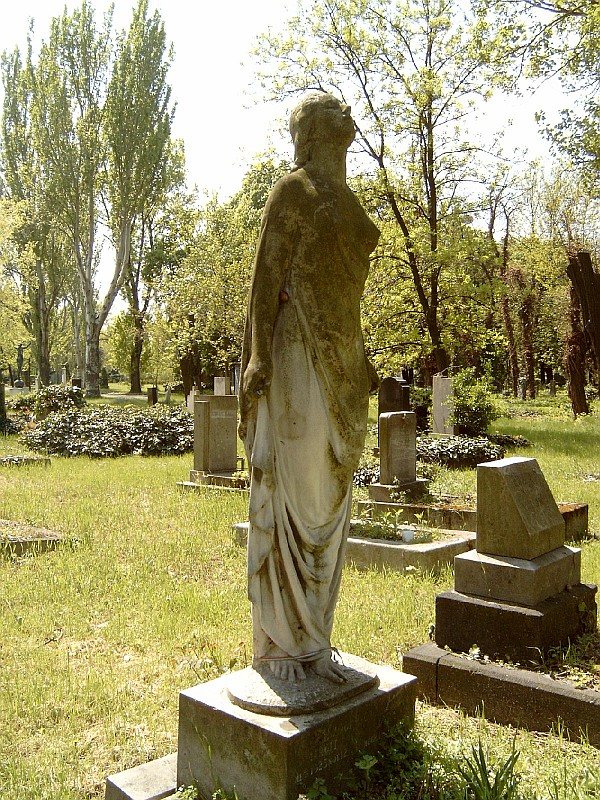
Tomb of Ella Gombaszögi in Kerepes cemetery

- Vorrei morir (1918)
- Romance in Budapest (1933)
- Miss Iza (1933)
- The Ghost Train (1933)
- The New Relative (1934)
- Everything for the Woman (1934)
- The Dream Car (1934)
- A Night in Venice (1934)
- Romance of Ida (1934)
- Emmy (1934)
- The Homely Girl (1935)
- Miss President (1935)
- St. Peter's Umbrella (1935)
- Be True Until Death (1936)
- Cobweb (1936)
- An Affair of Honour (1937)
- Pay Up, Madam! (1937)
- Where Do We Sleep on Sunday? (1937)
- My Daughter Is Different (1937)
- Without Lies (1946)
- Janika (1949)
- Déryné (1951)
