= Sándor Pethes =

Hungarian actor (1899–1981)

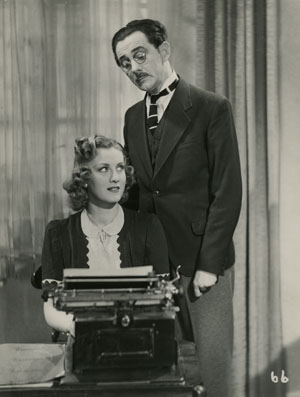
- Erzsi Simor and Sándor Pethes in Vadrózsa
- Born: 28 May 1899; Kassa, Austria-Hungary
- Died: 29 June 1981 (aged 82); Budapest, Hungary
- Occupation: Actor

Sándor Pethes (28 May 1899 – 29 June 1981) was a Hungarian actor. He was the cousin of the actor Ferenc Pethes.

== Selected filmography ==
- Rongyosok (1925)
- Átok vára (1927)
- Csak egy kislány van a világon (1930)
- The Blue Idol (1931)
- Spring Shower (1932)
- The Ghost Train (1933)
- The New Relative (1934)
- Romance of Ida (1934)
- Purple Lilacs (1934)
- The Dream Car (1934)
- Cornflower (1934)
- Everything for the Woman (1934)
- Thanks for Knocking Me Down (1935)
- St. Peter's Umbrella (1935)
- Villa for Sale (1935)
- Budapest Pastry Shop (1935)
- Dream Love (1935)
- The Students of Igloi (1935)
- Miss President (1935)
- Hello, Budapest! (1935)
- The Wise Mother (1935)
- The Empress and the Hussar (1935)
- Cobweb (1936)
- Sensation (1936)
- Be True Until Death (1936)
- Three Dragons (1936)
- Salary, 200 a Month (1936)
- Anniversary (1936)
- Family Bonus (1937)
- Help, I'm an Heiress (1937)
- All Men Are Crazy (1937)
- Tales of Budapest (1937)
- Hotel Springtime (1937)
- Magda Expelled (1938)
- Rosemary (1938)
- The Witch of Leányvár (1938)
- The Lady Is a Bit Cracked (1938)
- Barbara in America (1938)
- The Wrong Man (1938)
- Man Sometimes Errs (1938)
- The Hen-Pecked Husband (1938)
- Billeting (1938)
- Azurexpress (1938)
- The Poor Rich (1938)
- The Red Wallet (1938)
- Two Prisoners (1938)
- Young Noszty and Mary Toth (1938)
- Istvan Bors (1939)
- Money Is Coming (1939)
- Six Weeks of Happiness (1939)
- The Five-Forty (1939)
- Wild Rose (1939)
- Hello, Peter! (1939)
- Hungary's Revival (1939)
- Deadly Spring (1939)
- The Perfect Man (1939)
- Duel for Nothing (1940)
- Gábor Göre Returns (1940)
- Much Ado About Emmi (1940)
- Haunting Spirit (1940)
- Yes or No? (1940)
- The Relative of His Excellency (1941)
- A Bowl of Lentils (1941)
- Left-Handed Angel (1941)
- Silent Monastery (1941)
- Finally! (1941)
- Entry Forbidden (1941)
- Háry János (1941)
- Sirius (1942)
- The Perfect Family (1942)
- Katyi (1942)
- Kádár Versus Kerekes (1942)
- Male Fidelity (1942)
- We'll Know By Midnight (1942)
- Borrowed Husbands (1942)
- Time of Trial (1942)
- Mask in Blue (1943)
- Orient Express (1943)
- The Marsh Flower (1943)
- Siamese Cat (1943)
- Annamária (1943)
- Quite a Lad (1943)
- Loving Hearts (1944)
- Masterless Woman (1944)
- Hungarian Eagles (1944)
- After the Storm (1945)
- The Siege of Beszterce (1948)
- Mickey Magnate (1949)
- Hot Fields (1949)
- Try and Win (1952)
- Me and My Grandfather (1954)
- Keep Your Chin Up (1954)
- Fourteen Lives (1954)
- Springtime in Budapest (1955)
- Iron Flower (1958)
- What a Night! (1958)
- The Man Who Doesn't Exist (1964)
- The Moneymaker (1964)
- And Then The Guy... (1966)
