= Mariska Vízváry =

Hungarian actress (1877–1954)

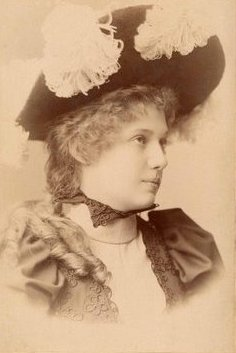
- Vízváry in 1900.
- Born: 27 May 1877; Budapest, Austro-Hungarian Empire
- Died: 9 January 1954 (aged 76); Budapest, Hungary
- Occupation: Actress
- Years active: 1920–1948 (film)

Mariska Vízváry (1877–1954) was a Hungarian stage and film actress. She was a member of the Hungarian National Theatre. She appeared in around forty films during the sound era, working as a character actress in supporting role. Her second husband was the actor György Kürthy.

== Selected filmography ==
- Cornflower (1934)
- I Can't Live Without Music (1935)
- Be True Until Death (1936)
- 120 Kilometres an Hour (1937)
- There Are Exceptions (1937)
- A Girl Sets Out (1937)
- My Daughter Is Different (1937)
- Rézi Friday (1938)
- I Defended a Woman (1938)
- Billeting (1938)
- Wild Rose (1939)
- Much Ado About Emmi (1940)
- The Gyurkovics Boys (1941)
- Prince Bob (1941)
- Don't Ask Who I Was (1941)
- Changing the Guard (1942)
- Male Fidelity (1942)
- Annamária (1943)
- The White Train (1943)
- Disillusion (1943)
- Boy or Girl? (1944)
- Treasured Earth (1948)
- The Siege of Beszterce (1948)

== Bibliography ==
- Kelecsényi, László. Vászonszerelem: a magyar hangosfilm krónikája 1931-től napjainkig. Noran, 2007.
- Terron, Carlo. Poltrona al buio: due anni di cinema (1941-1943). Sipario, 1996.
