= Rosemary (1938 film) =

1938 film

- Directed by: Emil Martonffi
- Written by: Zsolt Harsányi (novel); István Békeffy
- Produced by: Ferenc Pless
- Starring: Ida Turay; Antal Páger; Gyula Kabos
- Cinematography: Károly Vass
- Edited by: Zoltán Farkas
- Music by: Béla Csanak
- Production company: Harmónia Film
- Release date: 30 November 1938
- Running time: 84 minutes
- Country: Hungary
- Language: Hungarian

Rosemary (Hungarian: Rozmaring) is a 1938 Hungarian romantic comedy film directed by Emil Martonffi and starring Ida Turay, Antal Páger and Gyula Kabos. It was shot at the Hunnia Studios in Budapest. The film's sets were designed by the art director Márton Vincze.

== Synopsis ==
István plans to sell off some land on his country estate to a businessman. The latter sends his spoilt daughter Böske, who works as a secretary for him, to seal the deal. However she mistakes him for a humble peasant.

== Cast ==
- Ida Turay as Molnár Böske
- Antal Páger as Kevy István
- Gyula Kabos as Moser János
- Gerö Mály as Molnár Mátyás
- Artúr Somlay as Gróf Kelecsényi
- Erzsi Somogyi as Kékesné Panni
- Piroska Vaszary as Molnárné
- György Dénes as Báró Szabó Viktor
- Sándor Pethes as Forgalmista
- Margit Ladomerszky as Kery Bertalanné
- Lenke Egyed as Vendég
- Béla Fáy as Föpincér
- György Gonda as Jóska
- Menyhért Gulyás as Vendég
- Terus Kováts as Vendég Kevyéknél
- Gyula Köváry as Veres úr
- Márta Lendvay as Cukrászlány
- Zoltán Makláry as Vendég
- Géza Márky as Vendég
- Ferenc Pataki as Esküvöi tanú
- Sándor Peti as Hivatalszolga
- Gusztáv Pártos as Anyakönyvvezetö
- Zsuzsa Simon as Jolán
- Sári Sugár as Gépírónõ
- Dezsõ Szabó as Pincér
- Lajos Ujváry as Molnár inasa
- Zoltán Várkonyi as Fiatal mérnök
- Gyöngyi Váry as Szobalány

== Bibliography ==
- Juhász, István. Kincses magyar filmtár 1931-1944: az eredeti forgatókönyvből 1931 és 1944 között létrejött hazai mozgóképekről. Kráter, 2007.
- Rîpeanu, Bujor. (ed.) International Directory of Cinematographers, Set- and Costume Designers in Film: Hungary (from the beginnings to 1988). Saur, 1981.
