= Márton Rátkai =

Hungarian actor and comedian (1881–1951)

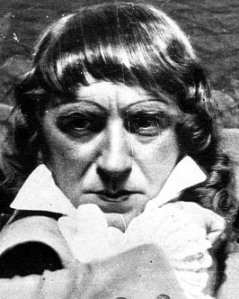
- Born: 18 November 1881; Budapest, Austria-Hungary
- Died: 18 September 1951 (aged 69); Budapest, Hungary

Márton Rátkai (born Mór Márton Fischer; 18 November 1881 – 18 September 1951) was a Hungarian actor and comedian. In 1917 he starred with Dezső Gyárfás in the comedy Harrison and Barrison, one of the most popular and best-known Hungarian films of the silent era. He was awarded the Kossuth Prize in 1949.

== Selected filmography ==
- Captive Souls (1913)
- St. Peter's Umbrella (1917)
- Harrison and Barrison (1917)
- White Rose (1919)
- Romance in Budapest (1933)
- Miss Iza (1933)
- Cornflower (1934)
- Purple Lilacs (1934)
- The Homely Girl (1935)
- St. Peter's Umbrella (1935)
- The Borrowed Castle (1937)
- There Are Exceptions (1937)
- Sweet Revenge (1937)
- Man Sometimes Errs (1938)
- The Witch of Leányvár (1938)
- Gül Baba (1940)
- The Siege of Beszterce (1948)

== Bibliography ==
- Kulik, Karol. Alexander Korda: The Man Who Could Work Miracles. Virgin Books, 1990.
