= Gyula Gózon =

Hungarian actor and comedian (1885–1972)

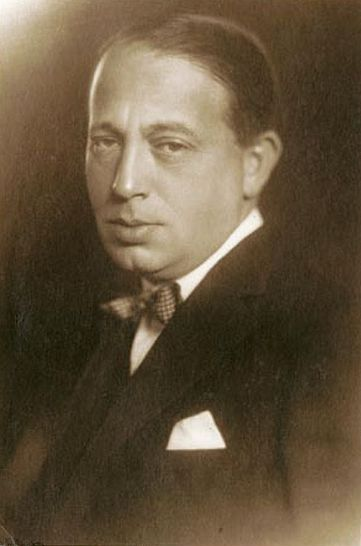
- Gózon c. 1917
- Born: 19 April 1885; Érsekújvár, Austria-Hungary
- Died: 8 October 1972 (aged 87); Budapest, Hungary

Gyula Gózon (19 April 1885 – 8 October 1972) was a Hungarian actor and comedian.

== Life ==
Gyula Gózon was born on 19 April 1885, in Érsekújvár, but grew up in Esztergom. With the mentoring of his brother, he could fulfill his dream of learning to be a singer actor at the actor school of Szidi Rákosi in Budapest. After graduating, he joins a group touring the southern part of the country, often working under harsh conditions, changing location and repertory often. During this period he has the chance to polish his prosaic capabilities, one that was omitted in Rákosi's school. After playing in Târgu Mureş and Miercurea Ciuc, he gains the attention of Miklós Erdélyi, the director of Oradea's theater, who offers him contract in 1904. He plays here for six years, and befriends Gyula Kabos, forming a lifelong comradeship, and comedic duo. In 1912 Endre Nagy offers him to join his newly forming Cabaret (Apolló theatre) in Budapest, followed by years working in the Népopera and Király Theatre. Gózon accepted his first movie role in 1914 (the silent film A becsapott újságíró), appearing nearly a hundred during his lifetime. In 1917 he marries Lili Berky, with whom he starts the Muskátli Cabaret, often appearing on stage together. After the venture failed in 1920, he joins the Belvárosi Theatre in 1927, followed by the Új Theatre two years later.

With Gyula Kabos he gets a role in Kék Bálvány, Hungary's first major motion picture, and like his mate, Gózon quickly becomes a much used actor of the emerging movie industry, appearing in the first hits of Budapest's theatres, like Hyppolit a lakáj or Meseautó. In 1935, along with his wife, he is contracted to the National Theatre). On the account of Jew-laws, he is banned from work in 1941, followed by years of hiding in his Rákosliget home during World War II. In 1945 Gózon re-joins the National Theatre, enjoying a second flowering of his career for a decade. After his wife's death in 1958, the health of the now 73-year-old actor began to fail, and seven years after his last appearance in the National Theatre, he died on 8 October 1972.

== Legacy ==
Gyula Gózon is one of the few entertainers who could be successful and active all along the years of the Monarchy, the Horthy regime, and the Communist rule. Throughout his long career, he appeared in over 90 movies (including silent ones), and was both a pioneer and master of the Hungarian Cabaret. He received the Kossuth Prize in 1954. His former home in Rákosliget is now home to the Gózon Gyula Repertory Theater, opened in 2005.

== Filmography ==
- 1914 A becsapott újságíró (silent)
- The Blue Idol (1931)
- 1931 Hyppolit, a lakáj
- 1932 Tavaszi zápor
- Kiss Me, Darling (1932)
- Romance in Budapest (1933)
- The Rakoczi March (1933)
- A Night in Venice (1934)
- 1933 Mindent a nőért
- 1934 Helyet az öregeknek
- 1934 Az új rokon
- The Dream Car (1934)
- Purple Lilacs (1934)
- Romance of Ida (1934)
- Emmy (1934)
- It Happened in March (1934)
- The Students of Igloi (1935)
- Thanks for Knocking Me Down (1935)
- Dream Love (1935)
- Villa for Sale (1935)
- Budapest Pastry Shop (1935)
- Kind Stepmother (1935)
- 1935 Szent Péter esernyője
- I Can't Live Without Music (1935)
- The Empress and the Hussar (1935)
- The Homely Girl (1935)
- Three Dragons (1936)
- 1936 Zivatar Kemenespusztán
- The Mysterious Stranger (1937)
- An Affair of Honour (1937)
- Sister Maria (1937)
- A Girl Sets Out (1937)
- Help, I'm an Heiress (1937)
- My Daughter Is Different (1937)
- The Lady Is a Bit Cracked (1938)
- Young Noszty and Mary Toth (1938)
- Rézi Friday (1938)
- Man Sometimes Errs (1938)
- Barbara in America (1938)
- 1938 Tizenhárom kislány mosolyog az égre
- Janos the Valiant (1939)
- Wildflowers of Gyimes (1939)
- 1940 A szerelem nem szégyen
- Semmelweis (1940)
- Sarajevo (1940)
- 1940 Zavaros éjszaka
- Castle in Transylvania (1940)
- Rózsafabot (1940)
- Queen Elizabeth (1940)
- 1945 Aranyóra
- The Schoolmistress (1945)
- Without Lies (1946)
- 1946 Mesél a film
- 1947 Könnyű múzsa
- 1948 Beszterce ostroma
- Janika (1949)
- Singing Makes Life Beautiful (1950)
- A Strange Marriage (1951)
- Déryné (1951)
- Honesty and Glory (1951)
- Try and Win (1952)
- Baptism of Fire (1952)
- The State Department Store (1953)
- 1953 Ifjú szívvel
- Relatives (1954)
- Me and My Grandfather (1954)'
- Keep Your Chin Up (1954)
- 1954 Simon Menyhért születése
- A Strange Mask of Identity (1955)
- The Football Star (1957)
- Adventure in Gerolstein (1957)
- 1959 Pár lépés a határ
- 1959 Tegnap
- 1960 Három csillag
- I'll Go to the Minister (1962)
- 1961 Puskák és galambok
- 1961 Nem ér a nevem
- 1961 Amíg holnap lesz
- 1962 Esős vasárnap
- 1963 Pacsirta
- 1963 Új Gilgames
- 1964 A kőszívű ember fiai I-II.
- 1964 Aranysárkány

== Sources ==
- Bálint, Lajos. Mind csak Színház. Budapest: Szépirodalmi Könyvkiadó, 1975. ISBN 978-963-15-0258-9
- Gyula Gózon in the Hungarian Theatrical Lexicon (György, Székely. Magyar Színházművészeti Lexikon. Budapest: Akadémiai Kiadó, 1994. ISBN 978-963-05-6635-3), freely available on mek.oszk.hu
