= Steve Sekely =

Hungarian film director

- Born: István Székely; February 25, 1899; Budapest, Austria-Hungary
- Died: March 9, 1979 (aged 80); Palm Springs, California, U.S.
- Other name: Stefan Szekely
- Occupation: Film director
- Years active: 1930–1973
- Notable work: The Day of the Triffids
- Spouse: Irén Ágay (m. 1933; died 1950)

Steve Sekely (February 25, 1899 – March 9, 1979) was a Hungarian Jewish film director. Born István Székely, he was known by several names, based on his changing professional and immigration status, including Stefan Szekely. He directed films in Hungarian, German, and English.

== Biography ==
He worked as a newspaper journalist in Germany, before returning to Hungary in the early 1930s. He directed one of the most famous classic Hungarian films, the frequently revived comedy Hyppolit, a lakáj (1931). That film was remade in 2000 and the original was later digitally restored and released on DVD.

Sekely left pre-war Hungary, fleeing growing fascism and laws restricting rights and professional opportunities for Jews.

He worked in Hollywood for much of his subsequent career, directing mostly B movies and early episodic TV. In March 1940 Sekely became what Movie and Radio Guide called "the first film director to invade the field of television" when he was signed by Los Angeles experimental station W6XAO to direct two one-hour plays, described as the most ambitious effort yet attempted by West Coast television.

Only one of these productions was made by Sekely, The Ides of March by Wilfred Pettit, was broadcast on March 28, 1940, at 8 p.m. from W6XAO and promoted as the first full-length play televised on the West Coast. Los Angeles Times critic Philip K. Scheuer attended the station's 2,572nd program and described "Theater Visionair Presents 'Ides of March'" as an eight-scene drama concerning John Wilkes Booth, starring Shirley Thomas and John Barkley, performed on a makeshift southern-mansion set with actors in panchromatic make-up, and directed by Sekely using two cameras for medium shots and close-ups. Hedda Hopper, also writing in the Los Angeles Times, described the play as a "psychological study of John Wilkes Booth during the period just previous to the fatal night he put a bullet in the back of Abraham Lincoln," noted that Sekely was "the first movie director to enter the television field," and reported that the production used three cameras and no film, with Thomas and Barkley playing Booth and his wife. A later trade note described the play as staged at Universal Studios, running 60 minutes and reported as the longest television play yet produced at the station. Sekely later compared the live production to "early Vitaphone."

Although he directed his best-known English language film, the cult science fiction thriller The Day of the Triffids in the UK, he returned to Hungary to direct his final film, The Girl Who Liked Purple Flowers, which was released in 1973.

== Partial filmography ==
- Next, Please! (1930) Germany (script)
- The Great Longing (1930) Germany
- Hyppolit, the Butler (1931) Hungary
- Flying Gold (1932) Hungary
- Rouletabille the Aviator (1932) France
- A Tremendously Rich Man (1932) Germany
- Romance in Budapest (1933) Hungary
- Scandal in Budapest (1933)
- Miss Iza (1933) Hungary
- The Rakoczi March (1933) Austria/Germany/Hungary
- Emmy (1934) Hungary
- Purple Lilacs (1934) Hungary
- Cornflower (1934) Hungary
- Romance of Ida (1934) Hungary
- Ball at the Savoy (1935) Austria/Hungary
- Address Unknown (1935) Hungary
- Be True Until Death (1936) Hungary
- Half-Rate Honeymoon (1936) Hungary
- Cafe Moscow (1936) Hungary
- Danube Rendezvous (1936) Hungary
- Sensation (1936) Hungary
- A Girl Sets Out (1937) Hungary
- An Affair of Honour (1937) Hungary
- Beauty of the Pusta (1937) Hungary
- Help, I'm an Heiress (1937) Hungary
- Two Prisoners (1938) Hungary
- Young Noszty and Mary Toth (1938) Hungary
- Number 111 (1938) Hungary
- Miracle on Main Street (1939) first US film
- Behind Prison Walls (1943) US
- Revenge of the Zombies (1943) US
- Women in Bondage (1943) US
- Lady in the Death House (1944) US
- Waterfront (1944) US
- My Buddy (1944) US
- Lake Placid Serenade (1944) US
- The Fabulous Suzanne (1946) US
- Blonde Savage (1947) US
- Hollow Triumph (1948) US
- Amazon Quest (1949) US
- Stronghold (1951) US
- The Empress of China (1953) West Germany
- The Missing Scientists (1955) UK
- Cartouche (1955) Italy/France
- Desert Desperadoes (1959) Italy
- The Day of the Triffids (1962) UK
- Kenner (1969) US
- The Girl Who Liked Purple Flowers (1973) Hungary
