= Emil Martonffy =

Hungarian screenwriter and film director

- Born: 9 September 1904; Új-Pest, Austria-Hungary
- Died: 20 August 1983 (aged 78); Budapest; Hungary
- Occupations: screenwriter, director
- Years active: 1930 - 1944

Emil Martonffy (1904–1983) was a Hungarian screenwriter and film director.

== Career ==
Martonffy completed his secondary education in Arad, Deva and Budapest. He studied mechanical engineering at the Budapest University of Technology and Economics named after József Nádor. He then became an assistant to Béla Gaál before undertaking internships in Vienna and Berlin. He returned home in 1934. In 1937, he founded the Aurora film studio. In 1943, he was involved in setting up the Vidám Színház (Happy Theatre), acting as director and chief director. He subsequently worked at the Popular Science Studio and the News and Documentary Film Studio.

His grave is located in the Farkasrét Cemetery.

== Selected filmography ==
Director

- It Happened in March (1934)
- Thanks for Knocking Me Down (1935)
- The Wise Mother (1935)
- Pogányok (1937)
- Rézi Friday (1938)
- Rosemary (1938)
- Hölgyek elönyben, Ldies First, (1939)
- Duel for Nothing (1940)
- The Chequered Coat (1940)
- Shako and Hat (1941)
- Sabotage (1942)
- Rózsa Nemes (1943)
- Mouse in the Palace (1943)
- A Lover of the Theatre (1944)
- Loving Hearts (1944)

== Bibliography ==
- Cunningham, John. Hungarian Cinema: From Coffee House to Multiplex. Wallflower Press, 2004.
