= Lina Khatib =

British Lebanese political analyst

- Born: Beirut, Lebanon
- Education: American University of Beirut; University of Leicester
- Occupations: Professor, analyst and commentator

Lina Khatib is a Visiting Scholar at the Harvard Kennedy School’s Middle East Initiative and an Associate Fellow at Chatham House’s Middle East and North Africa Programme, where she previously served as director. She is the former Director of the SOAS Middle East Institute at SOAS University of London, where she was MBI Al Jaber Chair in Middle East Studies and Professor of Practice in the Department of Politics and International Studies. She has also been director of the Carnegie Middle East Center in Beirut and co-founded and led the Program on Arab Reform and Development at Stanford University’s Center on Democracy, Development, and the Rule of Law.

== Early life and education ==
Khatib graduated with a Bachelor of Arts (BA) in Sociology and Anthropology from the American University of Beirut. She went on to pursue a Master of Arts (MA) in Mass Communication and a PhD in Social Sciences at the University of Leicester.

== Career ==
Khatib lectured at Royal Holloway, University of London from 2003 to 2009. She then moved to Stanford University's Center on Democracy, Development, and the Rule of Law in 2010, where she co-founded and led the Program on Arab Reform and Democracy. She then served as director of the Carnegie Middle East Center at the Carnegie Endowment for International Peace from 2013 to 2015, and was a Senior Associate at the Arab Reform Initiative from 2015 to 2016. She served as director of the Middle East and North Africa Programme at Chatham House, where she is now an Associate Fellow, from 2016 to 2023. She writes widely, including for the London newspapers The Times and The Guardian.

Beyond her work on Middle East politics, Khatib is a practitioner in the cultural scene. Her music projects include co-founding and co-leading the World Metal Congress. She appears in the documentary Metallica Saved My Life. As a visual artist, her work has been exhibited internationally, including in group shows such as Newtopia: The State of Human Rights (Mechelen, 2012) and a solo show, 24 Hours on Hamra Street (London, 2018). She is developing a theatrical piece on politics and society in the Middle East.

== Publications ==
- Filming the Modern Middle East: Politics in the Cinemas of Hollywood and the Arab World. I. B. Tauris. 2006. ISBN 978-0-85771-265-3.
- Lebanese Cinema: Imagining the Civil War and Beyond. I. B. Tauris. 2008. ISBN 978-0-85771-428-2.
- Image Politics in the Middle East: The Role of the Visual in Political Struggle. I. B. Tauris. 2012. ISBN 978-1-78672-462-5.
- Editor: Storytelling in World Cinemas. Wallflower Press. 2012. ISBN 978-0-231-16204-3.
- With Ellen Lust: Taking to the Streets: The Transformation of Arab Activism. Johns Hopkins University Press. 2014. ISBN 978-1-4214-1313-6.
