= A Tanítónő =

A Tanítónő may refer to:

- The Schoolmistress (1917 film), a Hungarian silent drama film
- The Schoolmistress (1945 film), a Hungarian drama film

== See also ==
- The Schoolmistress (disambiguation)
