= Éva Örkényi =

Hungarian actress (born 1932)

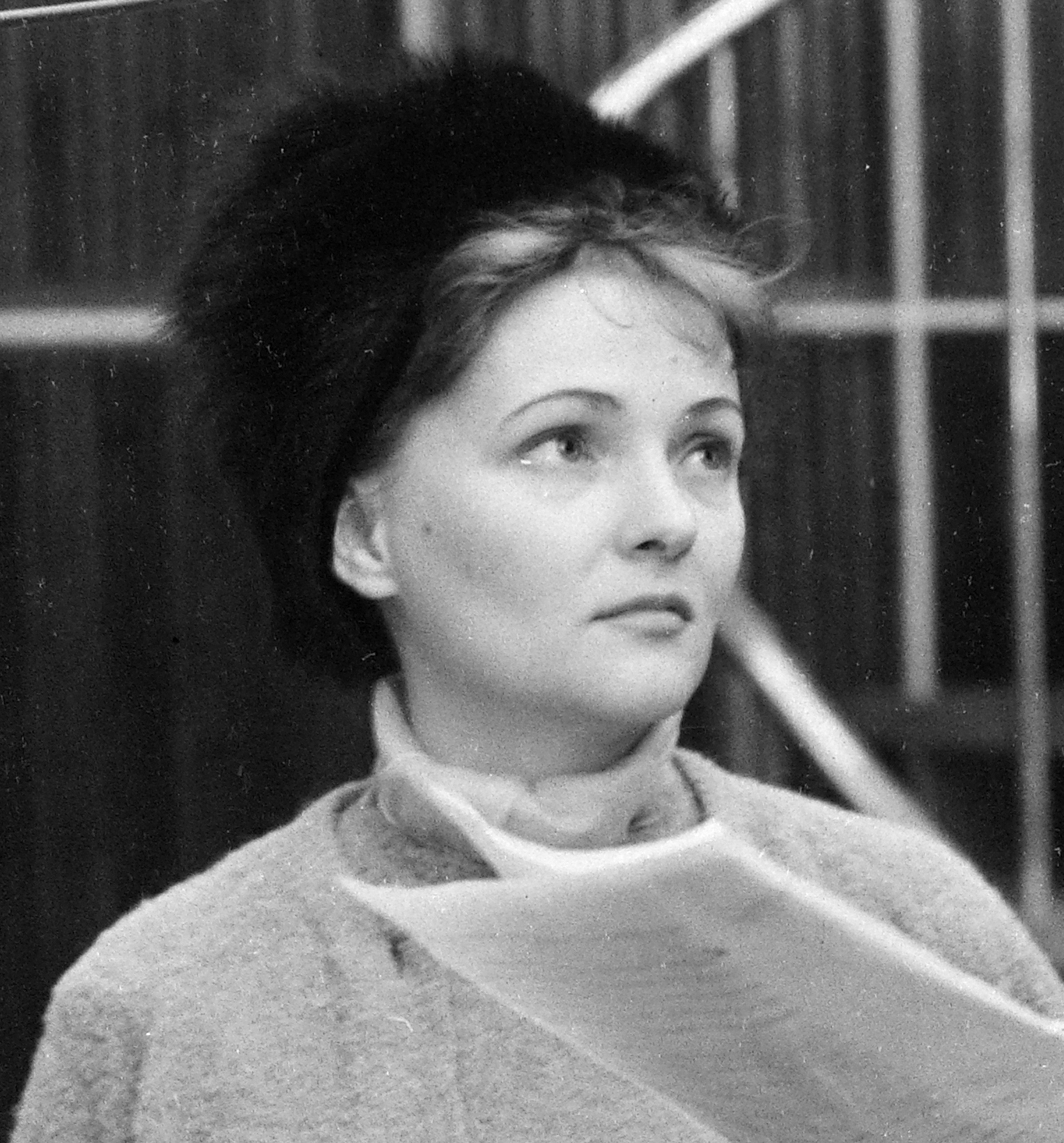
- Örkényi in 1959
- Born: 27 August 1932 (age 94); Törökszentmiklós, Hungary
- Occupation: Actress
- Years active: 1938–2002

Éva Örkényi (born 27 August 1932) is a Hungarian actress. Her acting career began with the 1938 film Az örök titok and ended in 2002. She has appeared on stage, in films, and on television.

== Early life ==
Born on 27 August 1932 in Törökszentmiklós, Örkényi was a year old when her family moved to Budapest. Her father worked in a bank but aspired to be an actor or writer. Örkényi had her first acting experience at age three in a children's theatre. By age five, she had her first contract with the Artúr Lakner children's theatre.

== Film and television credits ==
=== Film ===
- Az örök titok (1938)
- Money Is Coming (1939)
- Hungary's Revival (1939)
- Isten rabjai (1941)
- Mágnás Miska (1949)
- Forró mezők (1949)
- A Strange Marriage (1951)
- Erkel (1952)
- Kölyök (1959)
- A szélhámosnő (1963)

=== Television ===
- És mégis mozog a föld 1-3 (1973)
- Irgalom (1973)
- Osztrigás Mici (1983)
- Zenés TV színház (1983)
- Már megint a 7.B! (1985)
- A nap lovagja (1987)
- Maigret (1992)
- Rizikó (1993)
- Szomszédok (1994)
- Barátok közt (2000)
- A Nagyasszony (2002)

=== Theatre ===
- William Shakespeare's Rómeó és Júlia as Juliet
- Shakespeare's Hamlet as Ophelia
- Friedrich Schiller's Ármány és szerelem as Lujza
- Tennessee Williams's Üvegfigurák as Laura
- Beaumarchais's Figaro as Marcelina
- Zsigmond Móricz's Nem élhetek muzsikaszó nélkül as Birike
- György Ránki's Muzsikás Péter új kalandja as Hegedű
- Noël Coward's Vidám kísértet as Mrs. Bradman
- Endre Gyárfás's Dörmögőék csodajátéka
- Alexander Ostrovsky's Utolsó áldozat as Irina Lavrovna
- István Kállai's Keménykalaposok as Tünde
- Bengt Ahlfors's Színházkomédia as Mrs. Janson
- Aldo Nikolaj's Hárman a padon as Ambra
- Henrik Ibsen's Hedda Gabler as Miss Juliane Tesman
- Dezső Szomory's Bella as grandmother
- Fyodor Dostoyevsky's A félkegyelmű as Ganja's mother
- Sándor Bródy's A tanítónő as student's mother
- Endre Gyárfás's Dörmögőék vidámparkja as Anyó
- Friedrich Schiller's Stuart Mária as Hanna Kennedy, Mária's wet nurse
- Emil Braginszkij and Eldar Rjazanov's A képmutatók as Balakina, translator
- G. György Kardos's Villon és a többiek as Martha, Villon's mother
- Szamuil Aljosin's Anna őfelsége as Igazgatónő
- Stanisław Grochowiak's Őrült Gréta as Csöpi as woman in prison
- István Csurka's Nagytakarítás as Mrs. Porteleki
- András Berkesi's Kálvária as Mrs. Sipos, businesswoman
- Wolfgang Kohlhaase and Rita Zimmer's Hal négyesben as Heckendorf Klementina
- Plautus's Táncoló kísértetek as Júlia, Simon's wife
- Seán O'Casey's Juno és a páva as Maise Madigan
- Ákos Kertész's Névnap as Mrs. Mazur
- Mihály Károlyi's A nagy hazugság as Madame Alri
- Ferenc Molnár's Harmónia as Anna
- Carlo Goldoni's Két úr szolgája as Smeraldina, Clarice's maid
- Árpád Gabányi's Aba Sámuel király as Madléna
- Viktor Rozov's Ketten az úton as Gálja
- Lajos Mesterházi's Férfikor as Gizi
- Jean Anouilh's A barlang as the baroness
- Jean Giraudoux's Párizs bolondja as Gabrielle
- Ben Jonson's Volpone as Colomba
- Imre Kertész's Cyrano házassága as Julika
- Ede Tarbay's Játék a színházban as Ildi
- Dezső Kosztolányi's A lovag meg a kegyese
- Armand Salacrou's A túltisztességes asszony as Joséphine
- Marcel Achard's A világ legszebb szerelme as American girl
- Erich Kästner's Az eltűnt miniatűr as Busch Gertrud
- Alain-René Le Sage's A csalafinta bárónő as Marina
- John Errol's Holdfény egy szivárványszínű sálon as Esther
- Carlo Gozzi's Turandot hercegnő as Zelima
- Imre Kertész's Bekopog a szerelem as Szöszi
- Rozov's Boldogság, merre vagy? as Fira
- Károly Kisfaludy's Csalódások as Lídia
- Princev and Hocsinszkij's Csodák országa
- Tamás Emőd's Egy kis chanson as Vicomtesse
- Karel Čapek's Emilia Marty titka as Kriszta
- Tibor Téri's Erdei történet as Katjusa
- József Gáli's Erős János as Erdőszépe
- Rozov's Felnőnek a gyerekek as Kátya
- Ottó Major's Határszélen as Kata
- Oscar Wilde's Hazudj igazat! as Gwendolen Fairfax
- László Sólyom's Holnapra kiderül as Baby
- Lope de Vega's A kertész kutyája as Dorotea
- Maxim Gorky's Kispolgárok as Polja
- Afinogenov's Kisunokám as Mása
- Kálmán Mikszáth's A körtvélyesi csíny as Katica
- Mihály Fazekas's Ludas Matyi as Évi
- Ferenc Lehár's Luxemburg grófja as Juliette, dancer
- Tamara Gabbe's Mesterek városa as Maril
- Ferenc Bartos and Géza Baróti's Mindent a mamáért as Edit
- Kornyejcsuk's A nagy műtét as Mája
- Molière's A nők iskolája as Ágnes
- Ferenc Molnár's A Pál utcai fiúk as Nemecsek
- Victorien Sardou and Hégésippe Moreau's Szókimondó asszonyság as Vereske
- Dario Niccodemi's Tacskó as Tacskó
- Brustein's Tamás bátya kunyhója as Peggy
- Sardou's Váljunk el! as Josephine, the maid
- Lajos Barta's Zsuzsi as Szülike
- István Csurka's LSD as Mrs. Rácz
