= Million pound note =

Million pound note may refer to:

- The Million Pound Note, a 1954 British film
- The One Million Pound Note, a 1916 Hungarian silent film
- "The Million Pound Bank Note", a short story by Mark Twain
- Bank of England £1,000,000 note
