= Tamás Böröndi =

Hungarian actor (1955–2020)

- Born: 8 March 1955; Budapest, Hungary
- Died: 23 November 2020 (aged 65); Budapest, Hungary
- Occupation(s): actor, theatre manager, and scenic designer
- Years active: 1980–2020
- Works: Csaba, teacher (Szomszédok) (1989–1999)
- Spouses: Zsuzsa Kovács (divorced); Anna Götz (m. 2016)
- Children: Lilla and Anna (1999)

Tamás Böröndi (8 March 1955 – 23 November 2020) was a Hungarian actor, theatre manager and scenic designer.

== Career ==
He graduated from University of Theatre and Film Arts in Budapest in 1980. He started his career as a member of Csokonai Theatre in Debrecen. In addition to this, he performed at Rock Theater as a guest artist. From 1984, he played at The Budapest Operetta and Musical Theatre, later at Comedy Stage. From 2002, he worked as a freelance actor at various theaters, such as Karinthy Theater, Budaörs Latinovits Theater and Kalocsa Theater. From 2013 he was manager of Comedy Stage Theater until his death, where he was active as a scenic designer as well.

He was most active as a theatrical actor, but he gained a national recognition by the immensely popular television series of the 80s and 90s Szomszédok, where he starred as Csaba, a teacher in a supporting role.

He had acted in 65 plays, directed five and was a choreographer of another five.

== Theater (selection) ==
- John Osborne: Look Back in Anger – Cliff
- Some like it hot (play) – Jay
- Ray Cooney: Two into One – Ray
- Ray Cooney: It Runs in the Family – Dr. Hubert Bonney; Dr. David Mortimer
- Ray Cooney: Funny Money – Vic
- Leonard Bernstein: West Side Story – Riff, Bernardo
- Eugène Scribe: The Glass of Water – Masham
- Victorien Sardou: Madame Sans-Gêne – Lefebvre
- Neil Simon: The Sunshine Boys – Ben Silverman
- Emmerich Kálmán: Das Veilchen vom Montmartre – Henry

== Television (selection) ==
- Szomszédok – Csaba (teacher) (1989–1999)
- Samba – Soldier
- Jóban-Rosszban – Dr. Elemér Kincses

== Personal life and death ==
He was married three times. He had his twin daughters Lilla and Anna (1999) from his first marriage. Later, he had been with actress Zsuzsa Kovács for seven years. He started dating actress Anna Götz in 2012, whom he married in August 2016.

He died of COVID-19 on 23 November 2020, aged 65, at a Budapest Hospital in Hungary. He had no underlying diseases.
