= Csaba Kelemen =

Hungarian actor (1953–2020)

- Born: Csaba Kelemen; 10 September 1955; Szolnok, Hungary
- Died: 26 October 2020 (aged 65); Miskolc, Hungary
- Occupation(s): Actor, stage manager, and politician

Csaba Kelemen (10 September 1955 – 26 October 2020) was a Hungarian actor, stage manager, and politician who died of COVID-19.

== Career ==
He graduated from University of Theatre and Film Arts in Budapest in 1980. From 1980 until 1982 he was a member of Csokonai Theatre in Debrecen. From 1982 until 1989 he worked at Budapest Radnóti Theater and in that year, he went to work at Eger Géza Gárdonyi Theater, where he worked as an actor and a stage manager until his death.

He was most active as a theatrical actor, but he also starred in a few commercially successful television series in Hungary in the 80s and 90s, mainly in supporting roles.

He had played in 126 plays, and contributed to 78 theatrical premieres in 13 years.

=== As a politician ===
From 1994, he was Heves County Secretary-General and Eger President of the Independent Smallholders, Agrarian Workers and Civic Party.

== Theater (selection) ==
- Géza Gárdonyi: Eclipse of the Crescent Moon – István Dobó
- Sándor Márai: Embers – Capt. Konrád
- William Shakespeare: The Twelfth Night - Orsino
- Edward Albee: Who's Afraid of Virginia Woolf? - George
- Samuel Beckett: Waiting for Godot – Pozzo
- Eugene O'Neill: Long Day's Journey into Night – James Tyrone
- Mikhail Bulgakov: The Master and Margarita - Stravinsky
- Jerry Bock: Fiddler on the Roof - Avram
- Raymond Chandler: The Long Goodbye – Det. Dayton
- Willy Russell: Blood Brothers – Mr. Lyons

== Television (selection) ==
- Szomszédok – Ferenc Dőri (ambulance officer) (1987-1992)
- Angyalbőrben (1990)
- Kisváros – Oszkár Erdős, business partner of Mr. Trócsányi (1994-1999)
- Embers – Capt. Konrád (2010)
- Szinglik éjszakája – Tibor, Juli's father

== Death ==
He died of COVID-19 on 26 October 2020, at Miskolc Hospital in Hungary.
