= Mihály Fekete =

Hungarian actor, screenwriter and film director

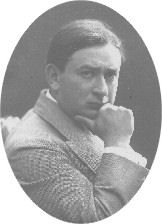
- Born: Fekete Mihály; 31 December 1884; Csongrád, Austro-Hungarian Empire
- Died: 16 April 1960 (aged 75); Cluj-Napoca, Romania
- Occupations: Actor, screenwriter, film director
- Years active: 1915–1936
- Spouse: Mária Felszeghy

Mihály Fekete (31 December 1884 – 16 April 1960) was a Hungarian actor, screenwriter and film director.

== Selected filmography ==
Actor

- The Yellow Foal (1913)
- The Exile (1914)
- Bánk Bán (1914)
- Az aranyember (1936)

Director

- Szibéria (1916)
- Doktorok tragédiája (1918)
- Akik életet cserélnek (1918)
- A kancsuka hazájában (1918)

Screenwriter

- The Schoolmistress (1917)

== Bibliography ==
- Cunningham, John. Hungarian Cinema: From Coffee House to Multiplex. Wallflower Press, 2004.
