= Géza Varga =

Géza Varga is the name of:

- Géza Varga (director), Hungarian director and academic
- Géza Varga (politician), Hungarian politician
- Géza Varga (tennis), Hungarian tennis player
