= The Schoolmistress =

The Schoolmistress may refer to:

- The Schoolmistress (play), a farce by Arthur Wing Pinero
- The Schoolmistress (1917 film), a Hungarian silent drama film
- The Schoolmistress (1945 film), a Hungarian drama film
- The Schoolmistress (painting), a 1784 painting by John Opie
- The Schoolmistress (Wednesday Theatre), a 1967 Australian TV play based on the farce

== See also ==
- Schoolmistress
