= Corvin Film Studio =

Hungarian film production company

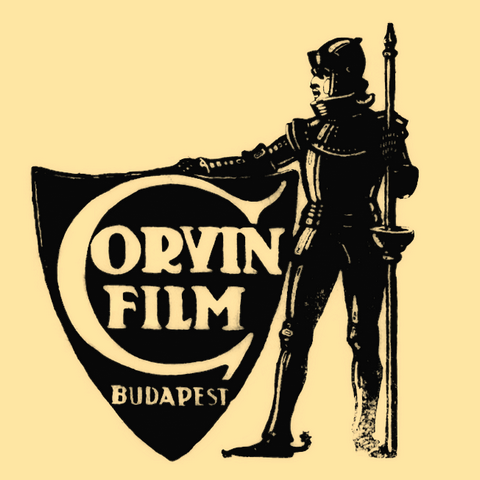
- Founded: 16 October 1916
- Defunct: 18 December 1928

The Corvin Film Studio (in its original official name: Corvin Filmgyár és Filmkereskedelmi Rt.) established in 1916, was the largest film production company in Hungary, as well as the third-largest film company in Europe in the era of silent film. Their films were characterized by a high standard of literature and excellent artistic preparation.

== Background ==
In 1916 the Corvin Film Studio was founded by Dr. Jenő Janovics, an influential Hungarian media entrepreneur; director of the Hungarian National Theater of Kolozsvár. The place of incorporation was in the city of Kolozsvár (Cluj in Romanian; Klausenburg in German) the so-called capital of Transylvania.

By this time Janovics – who was rightly called the creator of Hollywood in Transylvania – already had serious film experiences. In 1913, he made the first Transylvanian film, The Yellow Foal (Sárga csikó) in co-production with the Parisian Pathé Film Studio. The film became a blockbuster with noisy success on all five continents.

In 1914 he formed a joint venture with Projectograph, Hungary 's leading filmmaker, under the name Proja (Projectograph & Janovics). He had been working there among others with Michael Curtiz (Kertész Mihály) the future Academy Awards director, the famous The Exile (A tolonc) silent film was made by them.

== Production in Kolozsvár ==
In 1916 Janovics became independent of Projectograph setting up his new Corvin Film Studio in Kolozsvár. The company's name was a reference to the great 15th Century Hungarian King Matthias Corvinus. Janovics's production program concentrated largely on adaptations of popular and classic Hungarian literature.

The young Alexander Korda (Korda Sándor) was discovered for Corvin by Janovics who brought him to his new film studio from Budapest in 1916.

== Production in Budapest ==
An increasingly dominant presence at the company was the young film director Korda who joined Corvin as a leading director. Korda directed there White Nights, one of the first Hungarian films to be shown outside the country.

Next year Janovics sold the company to Korda and Miklós Pásztory. They exclusively contracted several stars of the age, including Arthur Somlay, Oszkár Beregi and Mihály Várkonyi. Korda's wife, actress María Corda starred in several Corvin productions too.

Korda and Pásztory expanded into the Hungarian capital in the same year. On 16 October 1917, with a registered capital of one million korona, the Corvin Film Factory and Film Trade Co. was established even in Budapest. For more than 100 years, this film studio became the emblematic site of Hungarian film productions. It still works at the same place.

The boom caused by World War I had a positive impact on Corvin Film. The film import ban boosted domestic demand for Hungarian films. Corvin's registered capital was increased to two and a half million korona in 1918 and then to eight million korona in 1919. In addition to the success in Hungary, Corvin's films were also successful on the international market. In parallel to his role as manager, Korda also directed at the studio. He directed one of the first Hungarian films to be shown abroad, White Nights.

== Decline and takeover ==
In 1919 Korda became a member of the Communist Directorate of Soviet Republic as the director of film productions, but after the end of the Red Terror and the defeat of the Hungarian Soviet Republic in the Hungarian-Romanian War he had to flee the country. Subsequently, due to the influx of American films, Hungarian films were increasingly overshadowed, with fewer and fewer films being filmed in the Corvin studio. In 1922, the Corvin Film Studio temporarily ceased production of films.

In 1923 the factory was modernized and reorganized to become the third-largest studio in Central Europe, with a height of 18 metres and a floor area of 4×20 metres. But as the economic conditions worsened, the factory went bankrupt in 1926.

It was acquired by the Filmipari Alap in 1927, and later became one of the trustees of Hunnia Film Studio, a major sound film studio in Hungary.

== Filmography ==
Corvin's films by date

1. The Yellow Foal (Hungarian: Sárga csikó, 1913)
2. Méltóságos rabasszony (1916)
3. A dolovai nábob leánya (1916)
4. Ártatlan vagyok! (1916)
5. A hattestparancsnok (1916)
6. Ciklámen (1916)
7. Struggling Hearts (Vergödö szívek, 1916)
8. A nagymama (1916)
9. Soha többé... mindörökké! (1916)
10. Szibéria (1916)
11. Tales of the Typewriter (Mesék az írógépről, 1916)
12. Miska the Magnate (Mágnás Miska, 1916)
13. The One Million Pound Note (Az egymillió fontos bankó, 1916)
14. A gyónás szentsége (1916)
15. A peleskei nótárius (1916)
16. Petőfi dalciklus (1916)
17. A kétszívű férfi (1916)
18. A szobalány (1916)
19. White Nights (Fehér éjszakák, 1916)
20. A feleség (1916)
21. A csikós (1917)
22. The Stork Caliph (A gólyakalifa, 1917)
23. Magic (Mágia, (1917)
24. St. Peter's Umbrella (Szent Péter esernyője, 1917)
25. Harrison and Barrison (Harrison és Barrison, 1917)
26. A riporterkirály (1917)
27. A piros bugyelláris (1917)
28. A haza oltára (1917, short)
29. Csaplárné a betyárt szerette (1917, short)
30. Károly bakák (1918)
31. A kis lord (1918)
32. Faun (A faun, 1918)
33. A testőr (1918)
34. A kétlelkű asszony (1918)
35. Harrison és Barrison II. (1918)
36. Man of Gold (Az aranyember, 1918)
37. A gyáva (1918, short)
38. Ica babája (1918, short)
39. Tréfaházasság (1918, short)
40. Tutyut felszarvazzák (1918, short)
41. Tutyu kirúg a hámból (1918, short)
42. Mary Ann (1918)
43. Fehér rózsa (1919)
44. Number 111 (A 111-es, 1919)
45. A tékozló fiú (1919)
46. Ave Caesar! (1919)
47. Oliver Twist (Twist Olivér, 1919)
48. Yamata (1919)
49. A legnagyobb bűn / Mária nővér / Odille Mária (1919)
50. Fekete tulipán (1919)
51. Az igazság útja [Kutató Sámuel] (1919)
52. Neither at Home or Abroad (Se ki, se be!, 1919)
53. Lélekidomár (1919)
54. Tutyu ismeretséget köt (1919, short)
55. Tutyu lakást keres (1919, short)
56. Cow-boy, mint anyós (1919, short)
57. A sárga árnyék (1920)
58. Névtelen vár (1920)
59. Little Fox (1920)
60. Júdás fiai (1920)
61. A végszó (1920)
62. Keresztes vitézek (1921)
63. Farsangi mámor (1921)
64. Hétszáz éves szerelem (1921)
65. New-York express kábel (1921)
66. Az áruház gyöngye (1921, short)
67. Országos Apponyi ünnep (1921, report)
68. Majális a vérmezőn (1921, report)
69. Motorcsónak verseny (1921, report)
70. Lapterjesztők boxversenye (1921, report)
71. Budapest ifjúsága üdvözli Harding elnököt hivatalbalépése alkalmából (1921, report)
72. Olavi (1922)
73. Willy Drill (1922)
74. Freddy (1922, short)
75. Árvák imája (1922, short)
76. Múlt és jövő (1922, report)
77. One Dollar (Egy dollár, 1923)
78. Egy fiúnak a fele (1924)
79. Az őrszem (1924)
80. Magyar cserkészélet (1924, report)
81. Terike (1927)

== Bibliography ==
- Lajta Andor. Filmművészeti Évkönyv az 1920. évre. Bp. 1920.
- Dr. Janovics Jenő. A magyar film gyermekévei Erdélyben. Bp. Filmkultura. 1936.
- Nemeskürty István. A mozgóképtől a filmművészetig. A magyar filmesztétika története. (1907 – 1930.) Bp. Magvető Kiadó, 1961.
- Nemeskürty István. A magyar film története. (1912 – 1963.) Bp. Gondolat Kiadó, 1965.
- Kulik, Karol. Alexander Korda: The Man Who Could Work Miracles. Virgin Books, 1990.
- Kőháti Zsolt. Tovamozduló ember tovamozduló világban – a magyar némafilm 1896–1931 között. Bp. Magyar Filmintézet, 1996.
- Cunningham, John. Hungarian Cinema: From Coffee House to Multiplex. London. Wallflower Press, 2004.
