= Ahlfors =

Ahlfors is a Finnish surname. Notable people with the surname include:

- Anselm Ahlfors (1897–1974), Finnish wrestler
- Bengt Ahlfors (born 1937), Finnish-Swedish playwright
- Fanny Ahlfors (1884–1947), Finnish politician
- Lars Ahlfors (1907–1996), Finnish mathematician
