= Fédora =

1882 play by Victorien Sardou

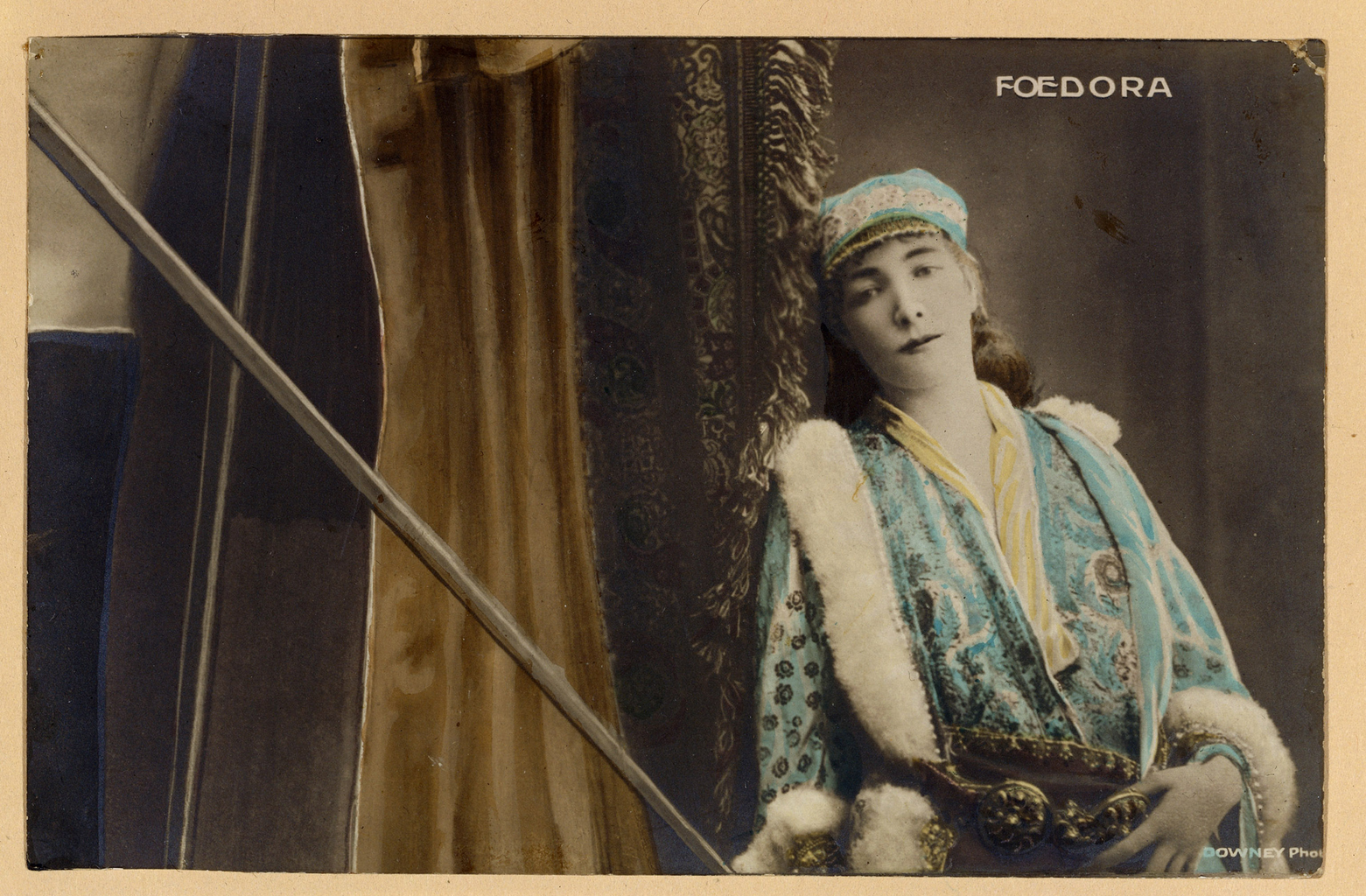
Sarah Bernhardt in Fédora

Fédora is a play by the French author Victorien Sardou. It opened at the Théâtre du Vaudeville in Paris on 11 December 1882, and ran for 135 performances. The first production starred Sarah Bernhardt. She wore a soft felt hat in that role which was soon a popular fashion for women; the hat became known as a fedora.

The premiere was headline news in Paris. Le Figaro devoted its whole front page to it in addition to further coverage inside. The Paris correspondent of The Era called Bernhardt's performance as Princess Fédora Romazoff "magnificent throughout … the most brilliant of her remarkable career". Pierre Berton played Loris Ipanoff, the only other major role, and was highly praised. The Era commented, "The other rôles are less than subsidiary. They are filled faultlessly by MM. Colombey, Tchileff; Vois, the Attaché; Boisselot, Michel; Mdlles. De Cléry and Depoix".

In one scene Fédora weeps over the body of her murdered lover. The deceased needed only to lie still, and Parisian men of fashion took to spending one evening each as the distinguished corpse. Albert Edward, Prince of Wales took a turn, delighting the city.

In July 1883 Bernhardt led her company in Fédora as the final production in a series of French plays given at the Gaiety Theatre, London. Berton again played Loris.

The play was turned into an opera, Fedora, by Umberto Giordano in 1898.

== Synopsis ==
Princess Fédora Romazoff is secretly engaged to marry Count Vladimir Yariskin, the son of the St Petersburg police chief. Vladimir is found mortally wounded, presumably in an anarchist attack, and Fédora vows vengeance on the known perpetrator, Count Loris Ipanoff.

Loris has fled to Paris, where Fédora seeks him out. Not knowing that she was engaged to the dead man he admits to killing Vladimir, but calls it "the execution of a sentence". He refuses to explain further. Fédora sends a letter to St Petersburg incriminating Loris's brother in Vladimir's murder. After she has sent it, Loris explains that the killing was not a political assassination but the punishment of a moral outrage: Vladimir was having an affair with Loris's wife. He caught them together and shot Vladimir; the wife escaped but died of pneumonia within days. Fedora now sees that Loris has saved her from marrying a villain. She realises that she loves Loris and he loves her.

Fedora's letter has meanwhile arrived in St. Petersburg, leading to the arrest and death in prison of Loris's brother. His mother has died of a broken heart. Fédora confesses to Loris that it was she who incriminated his brother. He renounces her; she takes poison and dies in his arms.

Source: The Era.

== Films ==
- Princess Romanoff, directed by Frank Powell (1915), starring Nance O'Neil
- Fedora, directed by Gustavo Serena (Italy, 1916), starring Francesca Bertini
- White Nights, directed by Alexander Korda (Austria-Hungary, 1916), starring Lili Berky
- Fedora, directed by Edward José (1918), starring Pauline Frederick
- Fedora, directed by Jean Manoussi (Germany, 1926), starring Lee Parry
- The Woman from Moscow, directed by Ludwig Berger (1928), starring Pola Negri
- Fedora, directed by Louis J. Gasnier (France, 1934), starring Marie Bell
- Fedora, directed by Camillo Mastrocinque (Italy, 1942), starring Luisa Ferida
- El precio de una vida, directed by Adelqui Migliar (Argentina, 1947), starring Mecha Ortiz
