= Bánk Bán (film) =

1914 film

- Directed by: Michael Curtiz
- Written by: Jenő Janovics
- Based on: Bánk bán by József Katona
- Produced by: Jenö Janovics
- Starring: László Bakó; Mihály Fekete; Jenő Janovics; Mari Jászai; István Szentgyörgyi; Victor Varconi
- Cinematography: József Bécsi; László Fekete
- Release date: 1914
- Running time: 90 minutes
- Countries: Austria; Hungary
- Languages: Silent; Hungarian intertitles

Bánk Bán is a 1914 silent Austro-Hungarian film directed by Michael Curtiz.

== Cast ==
- László Bakó as Bánk Bán
- Mihály Fekete as Mikhál bán
- Jenő Janovics as Biberach
- Mari Jászai as Gertrudis királyné
- István Szentgyörgyi as Tiborc
- Victor Varconi (as Mihály Várkonyi)
- Erzsi Paulay as Melinda
- Adorján Nagy as II. Endre király
