= The Borrowed Babies =

- Directed by: Michael Curtiz
- Written by: Jenő Janovics
- Based on: Baby Mine; 1910 play by Margaret Mayo
- Produced by: Jenö Janovics
- Starring: Aladár Ihász; Lili Berky; Kató Berky
- Cinematography: József Bécsi
- Distributed by: ProJa Filmgyár
- Release date: 22 March 1915
- Country: Austria-Hungary
- Languages: Silent; Hungarian intertitles

The Borrowed Babies (Hungarian: A kölcsönkért csecsemök) is a 1914 Austro-Hungarian film directed by Michael Curtiz.

== Cast ==
- Aladár Ihász as Aladár
- Lili Berky as Emma, Aladár felesége (as Berki Lili)
- Kató Berky as Aranka, Emma húga
- Alajos Mészáros as Dezsõ, Aranka férje
- Elza Báthory as Az anya
- Marcsa Simon as A mosónõ (as Mariska Simon)
- Hugó Kozma as A pincér
- József Berky as Detektív
- Mátyás Némedy as A rendõr
- Bertalan Pálfy as A fiákeres
- Gyula Nagy as Kálmán, Aladár fõnöke
