= The Million Pound Bank Note =

Short story by Mark Twain

- Short story by Mark Twain
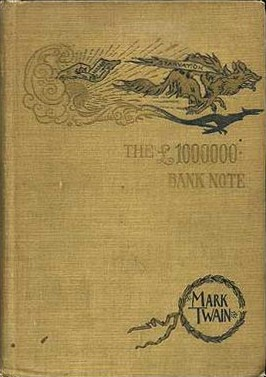
- First US edition of The £1,000,000 Bank Note and Other New Stories
- Language: English
- Genre: Short story

Publication
- Publication date: 1893
- Pages: 4

"The Million Pound Bank Note" is a short story by the American author Mark Twain, published in 1893.

== Plot ==
Henry Adams, a clerk in a San Francisco stockbroker's office, is swept out to sea while sailing one weekend. He is rescued by a ship bound for London and must work during the voyage to earn his passage, and he arrives in the city with his clothing in rags and only one dollar in his pocket. Two very rich and eccentric brothers spot him and give him an envelope with no information. Seeing money inside the envelope, Henry immediately heads for a cheap dining house and eats a meal; afterward, he discovers that the money is a single bank note for one million pounds sterling, the equivalent of $5 million in United States currency. Without knowing it at the time, Henry has become the subject of a £20,000 bet between the brothers. One believes that the mere possession of the bank note can enable a person to survive even with no other means of support, while the other feels that the holder will be unable to use it without drawing the authorities' suspicions.

Harris, the proprietor of the dining house, tells Henry not to worry about payment when Henry tries to obtain change. Henry then finds a note from one of the brothers, telling him of the bet and instructing him to return to them in 30 days with the bank note intact and unspent. If Henry fulfills these conditions and thus wins the bet for the writer, he can have any situation that he is qualified to fill. Henry realizes that he would not be easily able to exchange the bank note in the bank without being questioned about how he had come to have it, and that he would likely be charged with theft and arrested. He would also not be able to spend it since no ordinary person would be able to change it. Finally, in desperation, Henry decides to see if he can use the note to get a cheap suit to replace his rags, similar to the way he got his meal; when he pulls out the million-pound note to pay, the store manager gives him an entire wardrobe on credit. Ultimately, he becomes a celebrity in London as the "vest pocket million-pounder" or the "vest-pocket monster", and Harris' dining house becomes so famous that Harris actually lends Henry money. Henry tries to keep his borrowings under control so that he will be able to pay everyone back over time when he gets his situation.

After 10 days of growing fame, Henry reports to the United States minister in London, who had been a classmate of his father's at Yale. He is invited to a dinner party that night where he meets a young British woman, Portia Langham, with whom he is instantly smitten. Flirting with her, he tells the entire story of the gentlemen and their bet, which she finds hilarious. Also at the party is a good friend of Henry's from San Francisco named Lloyd Hastings, in London to sell shares in a mine and keep any sale proceeds that exceed $1 million. He is about to return home, having been unable to find any wealthy Londoners interested in buying, but Henry offers to use his celebrity to endorse the mine in exchange for half the profits. The shares sell out by the end of the month for a total of $3 million; Henry and Lloyd each receive $1 million, but Henry does not tell Portia of his new wealth.

At the end of the month, Portia insists on going with Henry to see the brothers. Although he has fulfilled the terms of the bet and is entitled to claim a situation, he turns it down, showing them his profits from the mining deal. Portia reveals that one brother is her stepfather and the other her uncle, whereupon Henry decides that the "situation" he wants is to become her husband. The two are married, and the brothers cash in the million-pound note, have it canceled by the bank, and give it to the couple as a wedding present.

== Film, television and radio adaptations ==
- A 1916 Hungarian silent film The One Million Pound Note, directed by Alexander Korda
- An American TV adaptation, the 18th episode of Your Show Time, aired on NBC Television on May 20, 1949
- The 1954 film The Million Pound Note was based on this short story, and starred Gregory Peck as Henry Adams
- The 1968 BBC TV adaptation, The £1,000,000 Bank Note, starred Stuart Damon
- The 1983 comedy film, Trading Places, features elements from both the short story and Twain's novel, The Prince and the Pauper
- The 1994 comedy A Million to Juan starring Paul Rodriguez
- The 2011 BBC Radio 4 adaptation The Million Pound Bank Note, starred Trevor White as Henry Adams

== See also ==
- The £1,000,000 Bank Note and Other New Stories
- Mark Twain bibliography
- Brewster's Millions, a 1902 novel written by George Barr McCutcheon
- Trading Places, a 1983 American comedy film directed by John Landis
