= Struggling Hearts =

- Hungarian: Vergödö szívek
- Directed by: Alexander Korda
- Written by: Marton Garas; Jenő Janovics; Alexander Korda
- Produced by: Jenő Janovics
- Starring: Lili Berky
- Production company: Corvin Film
- Release date: 1916
- Country: Hungary
- Languages: Silent; Hungarian intertitles

Struggling Hearts (Hungarian: Vergödö szívek) is a 1916 Hungarian drama film directed by Alexander Korda and starring Lili Berky, Gyula Gál and Alajos Mészáros.

== Cast ==
- Lili Berky
- Gyula Gál
- Alajos Mészáros
- Flora Fay
- Márton Garas
- Gyula Kozma
- Aranka Laczkó
- Andor Szakács
