= Jenő Janovics =

Hungarian film director

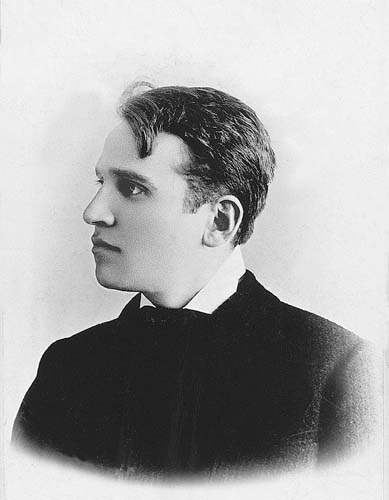
- Born: 8 December 1872; Ungvár, Austria-Hungary (now Uzhhorod, Ukraine)
- Died: 16 November 1945 (aged 72); Cluj, Kingdom of Romania
- Other names: Csepreghy Ferenc; Eugen Janovics; Jenö Janovics
- Occupations: Film director Screenwriter
- Years active: 1913–1920

Jenő Janovics (8 December 1872 – 16 November 1945) was a Hungarian film director, screenwriter and actor of the silent era. He directed 33 films between 1913 and 1920. He also wrote for 30 films between 1913 and 1918. He was the founder and driving force behind the Corvin Film studio, which also involved the rising young director Alexander Korda.

He was born in Ungvár, Carpathian Ruthenia, Austria-Hungary (now Uzhhorod, Ukraine), and died in Kolozsvár, (now Cluj-Napoca, Romania).

== Selected filmography ==
- The Yellow Foal (1913, dir. Félix Vanyl)
- The Exile (1914, dir. Michael Curtiz)
- The Borrowed Babies (1914, dir. Michael Curtiz)
- Bánk Bán (1914, dir. Michael Curtiz)
- Miska the Magnate (1916, dir. Alexander Korda)
- Tales of the Typewriter (1916, dir. Alexander Korda)
- White Nights (1916, dir. Alexander Korda)
- Struggling Hearts (1916, dir. Alexander Korda)
- The One Million Pound Note (1916, dir. Alexander Korda)
- Magic (1917, dir. Alexander Korda)
- The Schoolmistress (1917)
