= Mari Jászai =

Hungarian actress (1850–1926)

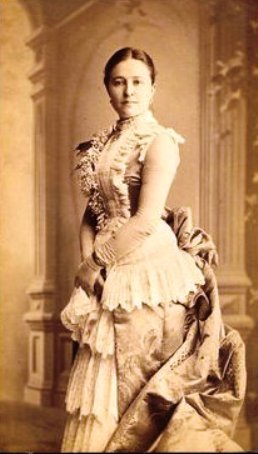
- Jászai in 1882
- Born: Mária Krippel; February 24, 1850; Ászár, Kingdom of Hungary, Austrian Empire
- Died: October 5, 1926 (aged 76); Budapest, Hungary
- Resting place: Fiume Road Graveyard
- Occupation: Actor
- Spouse: Kassai Vidor

Mari Jászai (born Mária Krippel; 24 February 1850, Ászár – 5 October 1926, Budapest) was a Hungarian actress.

== Biography ==
Mari Jászai 24 February 1850 in Ászár, Komárom County, as a daughter of a carpenter. She worked from age 10 as a maidservant, both in Budapest and Vienna, assisting soldiers as a sutling wench in the Battle of Königgrätz. In 1866, aged 16, she fled to the touring company of Gusztáv Hubay in Székesfehérvár, and began to work as an extra. By 1867 she already acted on stages of Buda, and from 1868, in the theatre of Kolozsvár. She met her first husband, comedian Vidor Kassai during her time in Buda, whom she divorced two years later, never marrying again. Jászai became a member of the National Theatre in 1872, where she remained until her death (except for the 1900 season, working in Vígszínház theatre).

== Legacy ==
A permanent member of the National Theatre since 1901, Mari Jászai became one of the most influential actors in the Hungarian theatrical world. Playing over 300 roles, she also translated a number of works, including Henrik Ibsen's John Gabriel Borkman. The theatre of Tatabánya is named after her, as are numerous public places in Budapest, and one of the premier awards of national dramatic artists, the Jászai Mari Award.

== Selected filmography ==
- Bánk Bán (1914)
- The Exile (1914)

== Sources ==
- István, Lehel. Jászai Mari emlékiratai. Budapest: Babits Kiadó, 2003. ISBN 963-9272-92-2
- Mónika, Balatoni. Tükör-játék. Budapest: Kairosz Kiadó, 2002. ISBN 978-963-9406-63-6
