= White Nights (1916 film) =

- Directed by: Alexander Korda
- Written by: Alexander Korda; Jenő Janovics
- Based on: Fédora; 1882 play by Victorien Sardou
- Produced by: Jenő Janovics
- Starring: Lili Berky; Kálmán Körmendy; György Kürthy
- Cinematography: Arpad Viragh
- Production company: Corvin Film
- Release date: December 27, 1916
- Country: Hungary
- Languages: Silent; Hungarian intertitles

White Nights (Hungarian: Fehér éjszakák) is a 1916 Hungarian silent drama film directed by Alexander Korda and starring Lili Berky, Kálmán Körmendy and György Kürthy. It was based on the play Fédora by Victorien Sardou and is sometimes known by the alternative title Fédora. It was Korda's first film for the Corvin Film studio. It was a major success and was one of the first Hungarian films to be exported to other countries.

== Cast ==
- Lili Berky
- Kálmán Körmendy
- György Kürthy
- Andor Szakács
- Rezső Harsányi
- Valeria Berlányi
- Aranka Laczkó
- József Berky

== Bibliography ==
- Kulik, Karol. Alexander Korda: The Man Who Could Work Miracles. Virgin Books, 1990.
