= Géza Varga (director) =

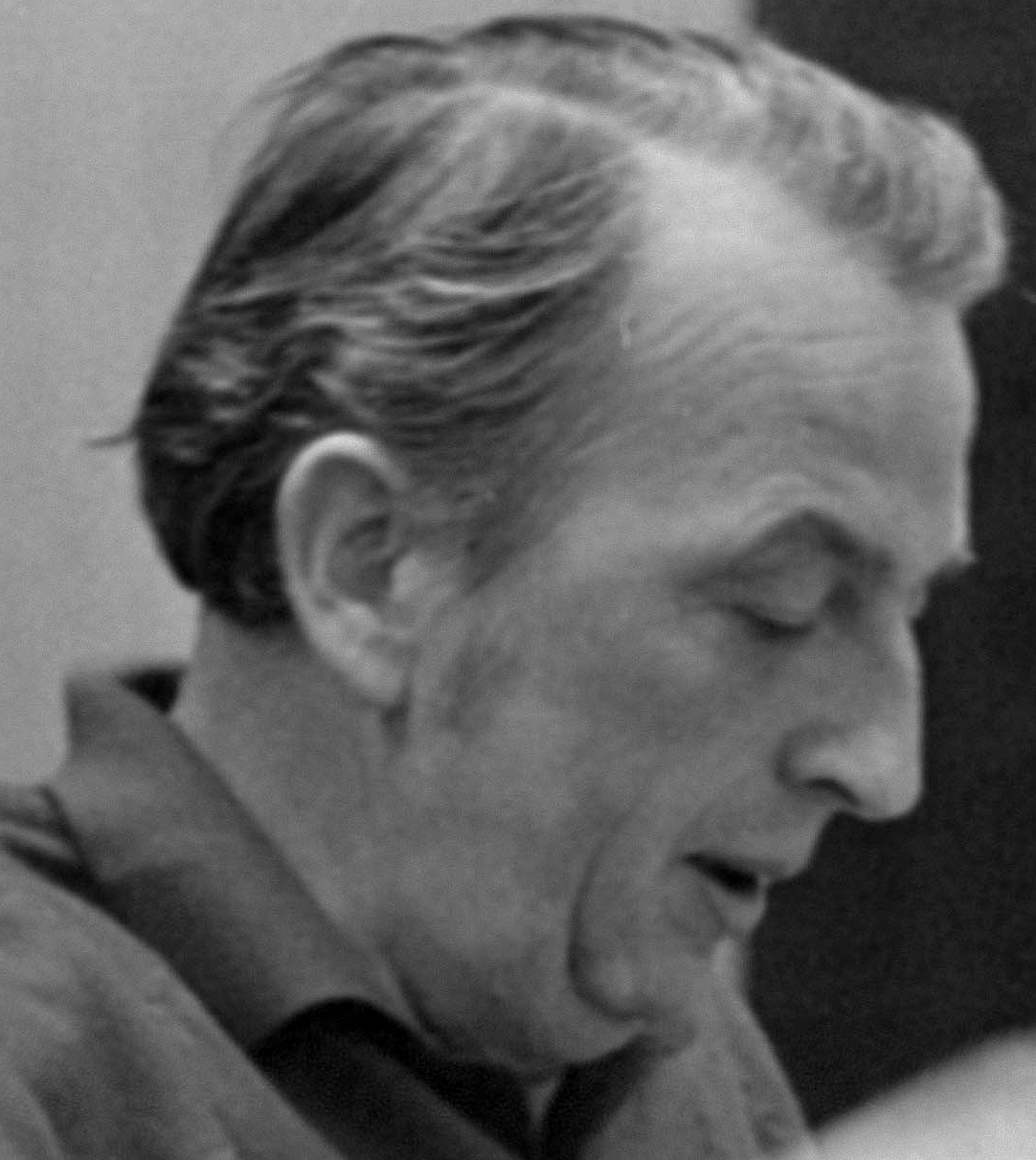
- Géza Varga in 1972.
- Born: 18 January 1921; Újpest, Hungary
- Died: 15 February 2004 (aged 83)
- Occupations: Theatre and radio director, professor
- Spouse: Zsuzsanna Gábor
- Awards: Jászai Mari Award (1967); Meritorious Artist (1977)

Géza Varga (18 January 1921 in Újpest, Hungary – 15 February 2004) was a theatre and radio director and professor.

== Biography ==
His father was Sándor Varga, his mother was Vilma Philadelfi. He studied law at the Pázmány Péter University from 1941 to 1945 and at Academy of Drama between 1942 and 1946. After finishing his studies, he started his career at Ministry of Religion and Public Education. From 1949 to 1951 he worked in Győr at People's Theatre at Transdanubia as a director. From 1951 to 1959 he was the theatre director of Petőfi Theatre, Theatre of Youths and Jókai Theatre. At the same time, he was a professor at his university. In the theatre year 1955–1956 he was the chief director of Szigligeti Ede Theatre in Szolnok. After 1958 he worked as a director at the Magyar Rádió.

He worked in London, Helsinki, Prague, Hamburg, Bucharest, Zagreb, Paris and Beograd as well. He made the first stereo.

== Personal life ==
He married in 1985. His wife was Zsuzsanna Gábor.

== Awards ==
- Jászai Mari Award (1967)
- Award of Critics at the Radio (1975, 1982)
- Meritorious Artist (1977)
- Cserés Miklós Award (1994)

== Sources ==
- Hermann Péter: Ki Kicsoda 2002 CD-ROM, Biográf Kiadó ISBN 963-8477-64-4
- Géza Varga
