= László Bakó =

Hungarian actor

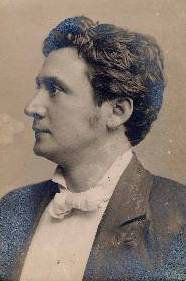
László Bakó

László Bakó (21 November 1872 in Sárközújlak, Kingdom of Hungary – 5 August 1928 in Budapest) was a Hungarian actor, most notable for appearing in the silent film Bánk Bán.

== Life ==
Bakó was born in Sárközújlak, Szatmár County, Hungary (now Livada in Satu Mare County, Romania). After graduating in 1899, he joined the National Theatre, of which he became a life member in 1920.

In 1898, Bakó won the Farkas-Ratkó Prize. At the National Theatre, the main roles he played were Coriolanus, Marc Antony and Brutus, King Lear, Othello, Shylock of Shakespeare's tragedies, Patúr-Petur bán in the Michael Curtiz film Bánk Bán, and Adam in Madách's The Tragedy of Man. He was also a trained singer who performed as a baritone.

He died in Budapest on 5 August 1928, at the age of 55.
