= Magic (1917 film) =

- Directed by: Alexander Korda
- Written by: Frigyes Karinthy; Kálmán Sztrókay
- Produced by: Jenő Janovics; Alexander Korda; M. Miklós Pásztory
- Starring: Victor Varconi; Magda Nagy
- Cinematography: Gusztáv Mihály Kovács
- Production company: Corvin Film
- Release date: October 1917
- Country: Hungary
- Languages: Silent; Hungarian intertitles

Magic (Mágia) is a 1917 Hungarian drama film directed by Alexander Korda and starring Victor Varconi, Magda Nagy and Antal Nyáray.

== Cast ==
- Victor Varconi as Grófnõ (as Lábass Juci)
- Magda Nagy as Lujza
- Antal Nyáray as Merlinuisz gróf / Danton / Szinéziusz, alkimista
- Lucie Labass
- Sam Jones

== Bibliography ==
- Kulik, Karol. Alexander Korda: The Man Who Could Work Miracles. Virgin Books, 1990.
