= Miska the Magnate =

1916 film

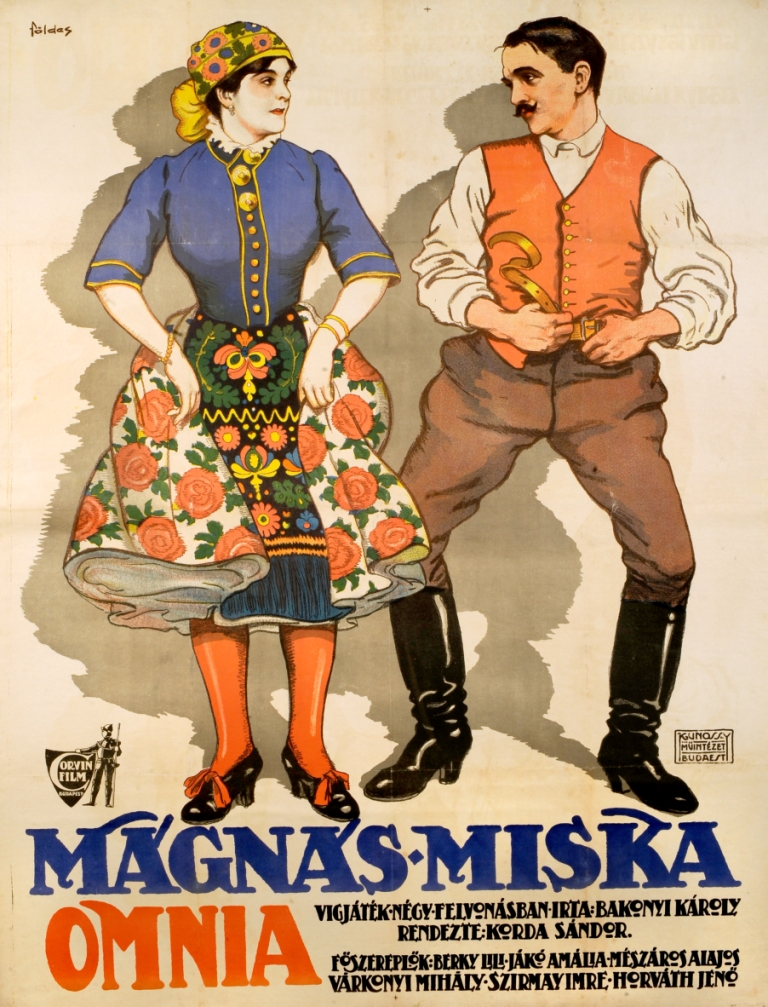
- Hungarian: Mágnás Miska
- Directed by: Alexander Korda
- Written by: Károly Bakoni (play); Andor Gábor (play); Jenő Janovics
- Starring: Lili Berky; Victor Varconi; Alajos Mészáros
- Cinematography: Arpad Viragh
- Production company: Corvin Film
- Release date: 1916
- Country: Hungary
- Languages: Silent; Hungarian intertitles

Miska the Magnate (Hungarian: Mágnás Miska) is a 1916 Hungarian silent comedy film directed by Alexander Korda and starring Lili Berky, Victor Varconi and Alajos Mészáros. It was based on a popular stage musical comedy by Károly Bakoni and Andor Gábor. The play was later turned into the 1949 film Mickey Magnate.

== Cast ==
- Lili Berky as Marcsa
- Victor Varconi as Baracs
- Alajos Mészáros
- Jenő Horváth
- Amália Jákó
- Marcsa Simon
- Imre Szirmai
- Éva Örkényi

== Bibliography ==
- Quinlan, David (1983). The Illustrated Guide to Film Directors. Barnes & Noble. ISBN 0389204080.
