= Csokonai Theatre =

Theatre in Debrecen, Hungary

- Csokonai Nemzeti Színház
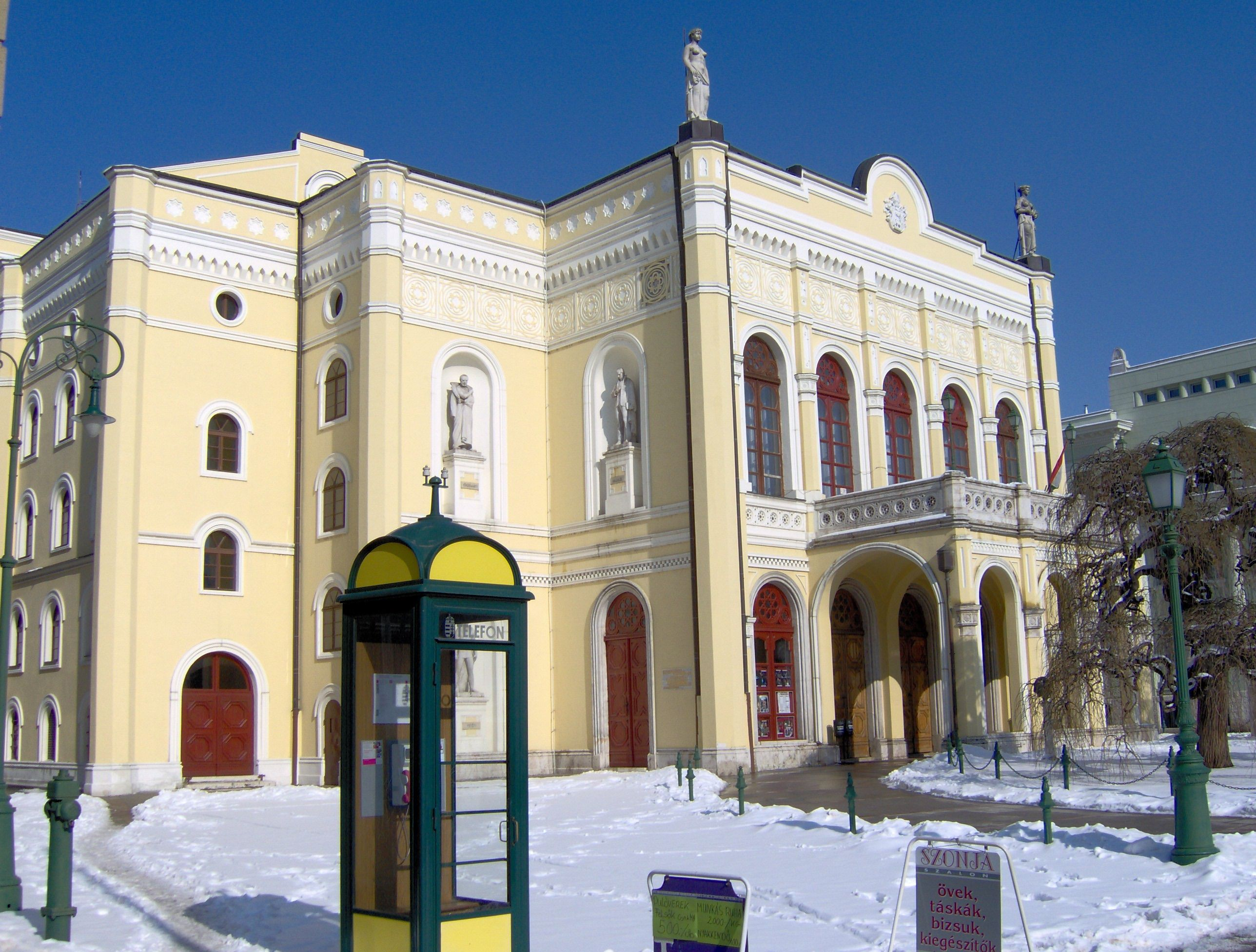
- Interactive map of Csokonai Theatre
- Full name: Csokonai National Theatre
- Former names: Theatre of Debrecen
- Address: Kossuth Lajos utca
- Coordinates: 47.5296°N 21.6281°E
- Type: Theatre, performing arts center
- Events: Theatre, opera, musical

Construction
- Opened: 7 October 1865

Website
- csokonaiszinhaz.hu/en

The Csokonai Theatre is the oldest and largest theatre in Debrecen, Hungary. It was named after one of the first Hungarian Modern Age playwrights, Mihály Csokonai, who lived and created many of his works in Debrecen. The building was designed by Antal Szkalnitzky with Moorish styled ornamentations, the theatre opened on Kossuth Lajos utca in 1865, with Róza Laborfalvi as Gertrude in a performance of József Katona's 1819 play Bánk bán.

Inside, the theatre is richly decorated, and outside are sculptures of Sándor Petőfi, Ferenc Kazinczy, Mihály Vörösmarty, Károly Kisfaludy, Ferenc Kölcsey, and Mihály Csokonai Vitéz, after whom the theatre was named in 1916.

Among the important actors that have performed in the theatre are Lujza Blaha, Kornélia Prielle, Csortos Gyula, Kálmán Rózsahegyi, László Mensáros, István Dégi, László Márkus, Zoltán Latinovits, József Szendrő, and Géza Hofi.
