= The Yellow Foal =

1913 film

- Directed by: Félix Vanyl
- Written by: Jenő Janovics
- Produced by: Jenő Janovics
- Starring: Lili Berky; Gyula Nagy; Victor Varconi
- Cinematography: Robert Montgobert; Dezső Paulique
- Music by: Károly Stephanides
- Production company: Corvin Film
- Distributed by: Pathé
- Release date: 1913
- Country: Hungary
- Languages: Silent; Hungarian intertitles

The Yellow Foal (Hungarian: Sárga csikó) is a 1913 Hungarian silent drama film directed by Félix Vanyl and starring Lili Berky, Gyula Nagy and Victor Varconi. It is known by several alternative titles including Son of the Pusta and The Secret of a Blind Man. The film was made by producer Jenő Janovics in partnership with the French company Pathé. The film was a massive success and was exported to nearly forty countries worldwide. On the back of the film's success Janovics built his Corvin Film company into a leading studio, attracting talented Hungarian actors, writer and technicians away from the capital Budapest to work for him in Kolozsvár.

== Cast ==
- Lili Berky - Erzsike, Bajkai lánya
- Gyula Nagy - Kántor
- Victor Varconi - Laci, Csorba fia
- Mihály Fekete - Csorba Márton
- József Berky - Bogár Imre, a haramiák vezére
- Gyula Beke - A kis Csorba Laci
- Dezső Bánóczi - Orvos
- Jenő Csapó - Pusztaabíró
- Gyula Dezséri - Csárdásgazda
- Zoltán Gálosi - Pali, a pusztabíró fia
- Ferenc Harcsay - Bagó, a vak koldus
- Rezső Harsányi - Sánta koldus
- Aladár Ihász - Tiszttartó
- Erzsi Imre
- Lili K. Hegyi - Csorba felesége
- János Keller - A bíróság elnöke
- Hugó Kozma
- Katinka Papp
- Rózsi Raya
- Andor Szakács - Bajkai András
- Terka Zách

== Bibliography ==
- Cunningham, John. Hungarian Cinema: From Coffee House to Multiplex. Wallflower Press, 2004.
