= Gazdagrét =

Neighborhood in Buda, Hungary

Coordinates: 47°28′15″N 18°59′53″E

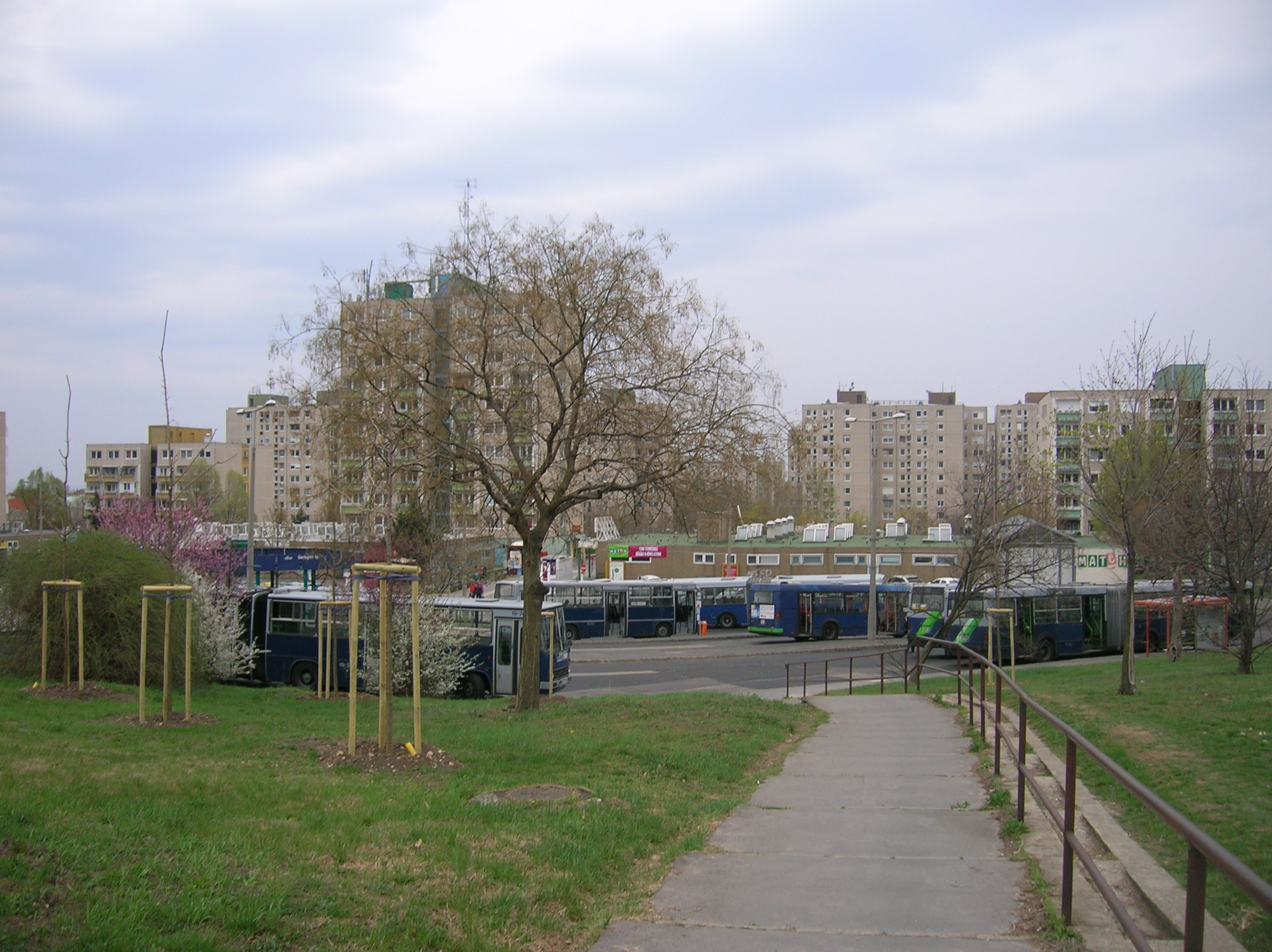
Bus station at Gazdagrét square

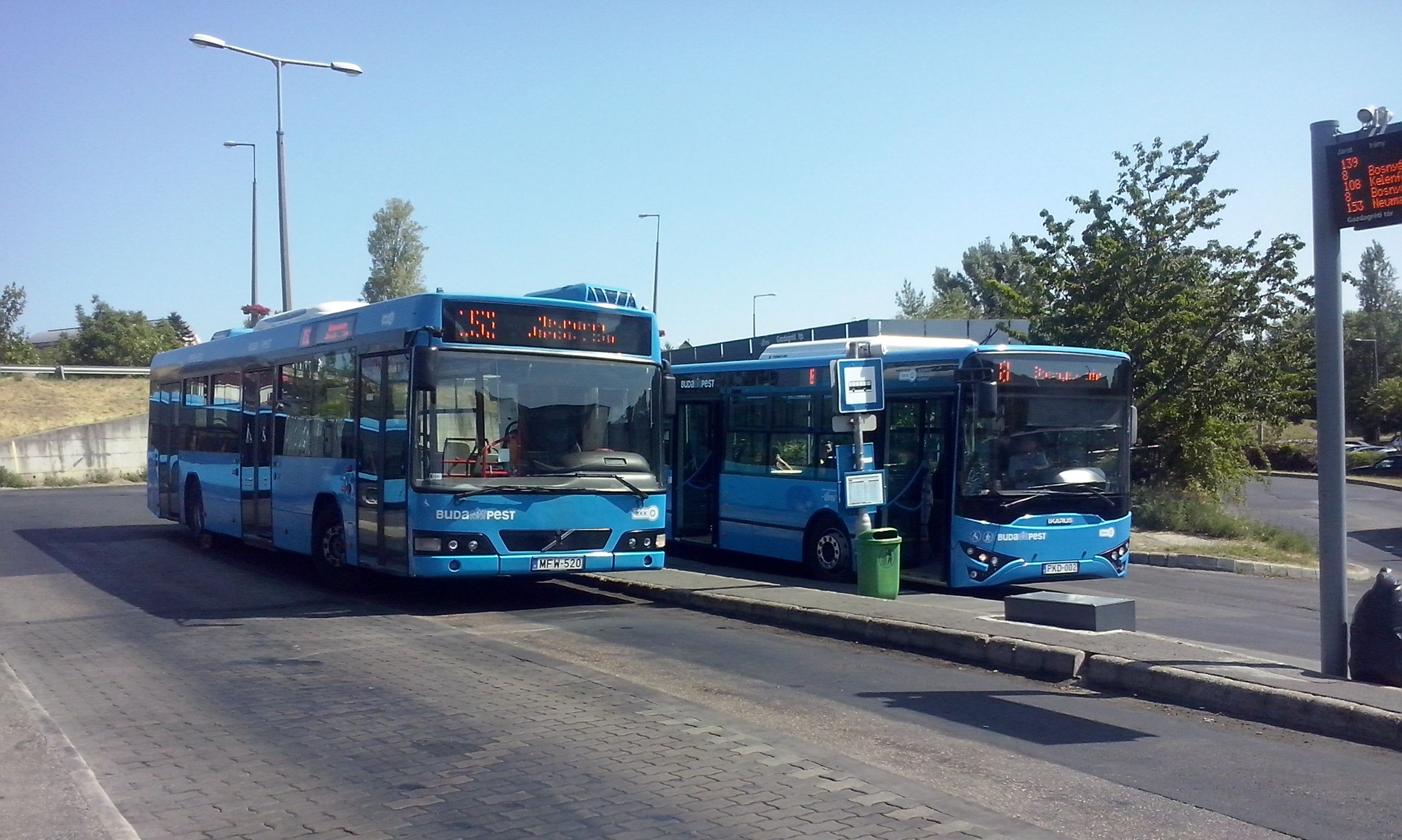
Bus station at Gazdagrét square

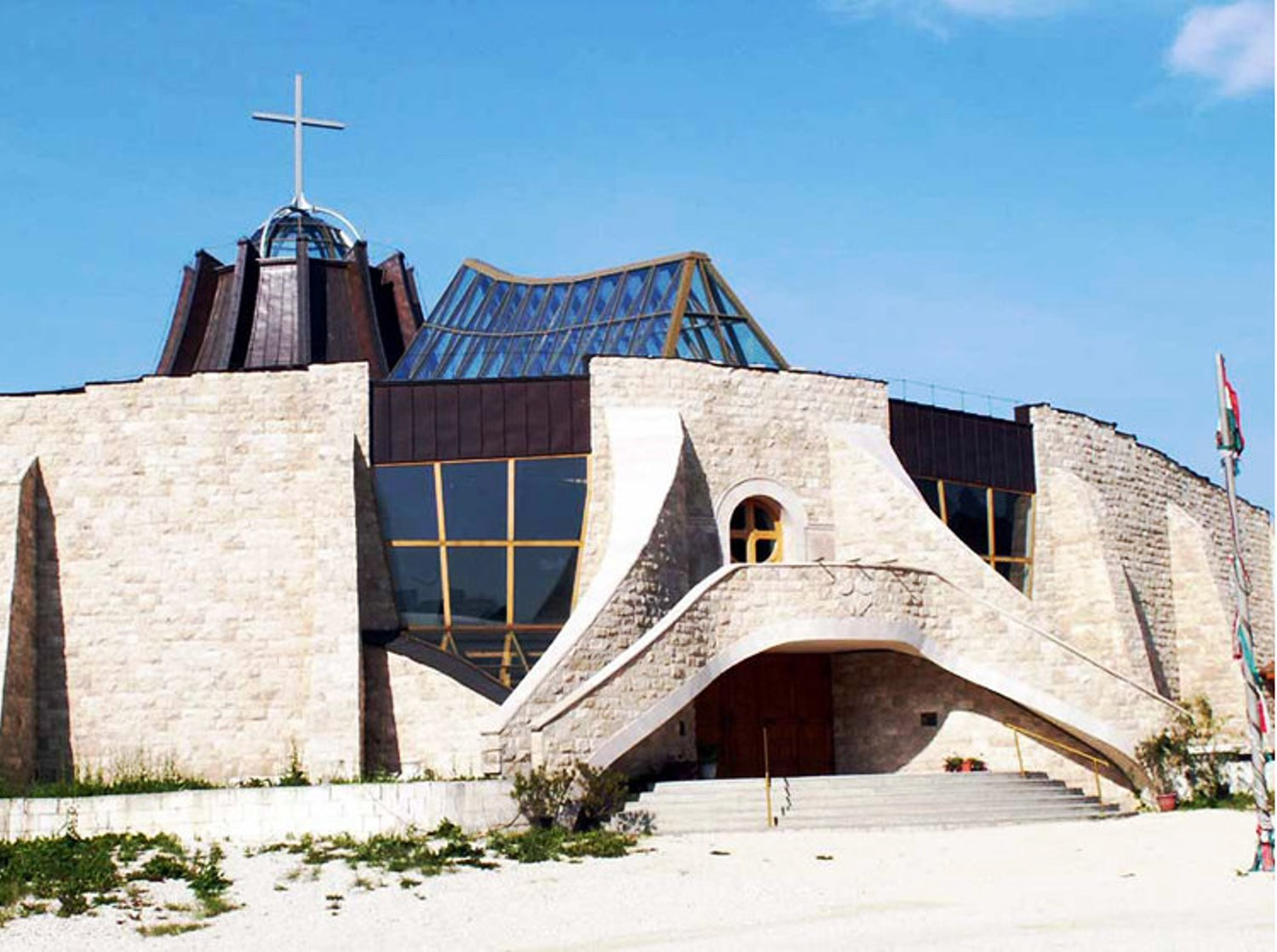
Holy Angels church

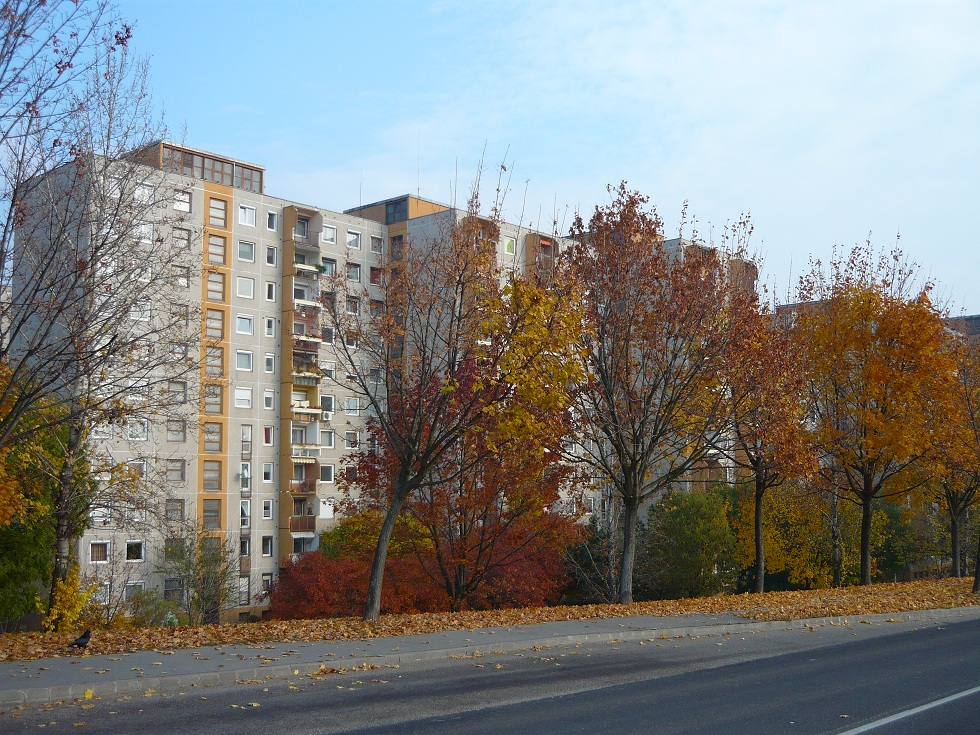
Gazdagrét houses in the autumn

Gazdagrét is a neighbourhood of Budapest, the capital of Hungary. It is located in the western part of the 11th district. It is a residential area consisting of prefabricated buildings (see panelház) with a population of 11,929 (2001 census).

The neighbourhood was built between 1983 and 1989, during the last of the Communist-era construction booms, and kept the name the area earned for its rich harvests when it consisted mainly of orchards (Gazdagrét literally means "rich meadow"). Due to its amenities and its reputation as a safe neighbourhood, it is the single most popular panel housing estate of the city. Gazdagrét is well known from the television series Szomszédok ("Neighbours"), which ran between 1987 and 1999 and was shot on location here.

== Location ==
Most of the area of Gazdagrét is bordered by two streets, Rétköz utca from northeast and Gazdagréti út from southwest. The nine streets of the neighbourhood run more or less perpendicular to these two, while a pedestrian street, Kaptató sétány runs between the two border streets, parallel with them. All three streets lead up to Gazdagréti tér ("Gazdagrét square"), which is the neighbourhood's highest area on the hillside. The area covers 0,9 km².

== History ==
During the archaeological excavation preceding the construction of the residential area, prehistoric vessels and a Roman period cemetery were found (this part of the country used to belong to the Roman province Pannonia and later to Pannonia Inferior). The excavation also found a rectangular, pit-house type home and other buildings from the Middle Ages, when the area was the property of the Pécsvárad Abbey. After the Mongol invasion (1241–42) it became a part of Nevegy, a village known from contemporary documents, and during the reign of Charles Robert, the abbey made an unsuccessful attempt to gain it back. For hundreds of years the area consisted of orchards, and also of vineyards up until the 19th century, when the phylloxera epidemic destroyed them.

The area bore the German name Reiche Ried until 1847, when German geographical names were replaced with Hungarian ones. Gazdagrét, a translation of Reiche Ried, refers to the rich harvest the orchards brought due to the rainfalls coming from Western Hungary. The climate of the neighbourhood is noticeably colder and wetter than that of the Inner City.

Gazdagréti út ("Gazdagrét Road") received its name in 1930; by then it was bordered by some residential houses.

The first plans for the construction of a housing estate were created in the 1970s. Construction began in 1983, with prefabricated panels coming from the factories in Győr and Budapest. The first buildings to be constructed were in the lower part of the hill; the first apartment – which was also the 200,000th apartment in the country with central heating – was ready by March 1984. Public transport service started on May 1, 1984, with bus line 153 which has been in operation ever since. Since the houses on the upper part of the hill were still under construction, the terminus of the bus was at Nagyszeben tér and was moved up to Gazdagréti tér in 1987; a new bus line, line 139 started operation at the same time. The first school year at Törökugrató street primary school started in 1984, another primary school was opened in 1985 in Csíkihegyek street. A nursery school opened in 1985, a grocery store in 1986, a doctor's office and a small library in 1987 and a high school in 1990.

Between 1987 and 1999 the popular TV series Szomszédok was shot on location in Gazdagrét, making the neighbourhood widely known in the country.

The neighbourhood has a wide area of amenities, several supermarkets, a small shopping mall and several other institutions including nursery schools, primary schools, a secondary school, a post office and a community building. Since the neighbourhood was constructed in the Communist era, originally no churches were planned, but after 1990 a Roman Catholic and a Reformed church were built. A continuing problem is the small number of parking lots in front of the houses, as the neighbourhood wasn't planned to have any garages (which is surprising given the time period when it was built); instead, small shops and cafés use the ground floors, where other housing estate buildings typically have garages. Public safety is exceptionally good and the neighbourhood is clean and attractive when compared to similar neighbourhoods in the city. Due to this, its reputation is favourable. In a 2010 survey, when 500 Budapest residents were asked to name the panel neighbourhood in which they would choose to live, Gazdagrét finished first.

== Sights to see ==
- Holy Trinity statue (limestone, 1761)
- "Mother and Child with Dove of Peace" (copper statue by Henrik Bolba, 1988)
- Basalt stone sculpture (by Sándor Kecskeméti, 1988)
- "Mechatronics" statue (chrome statue by Henrik Bolba, 1990)
- "Power of Earth" fountain (by Ádám Farkas, 1991)
- Two Roman columns commemorating the area's history (1996)
- Bacchus statue (by Kálmán Veres, 1999)
- Holy Angels Church (built in 2003 in the southwestern part of the neighbourhood, architect: Imre Koppányi)
- Reformed church (2004)
- Zsigmond Móricz statue (bronze, by Frigyes Janzer, 2007
- Elephant fountain (copper drinkwater fountain by Károly Krajcsovics, 2008; removed in 2011 in a theft attempt and put back in 2012)

== Transport ==
Gazdagréti tér is the terminus of five bus lines and is an important stop on the route of Bus 8E. Bus 8E connects the neighbourhood with the Inner City and Kelenföld railway station, the terminus of Metro 4. Bus 139 connects Gazdagrét with Déli Railway Station and the large transport hub Moszkva tér, bus 108E with the Inner City (on a route different from Bus 8), buses 153, 153A and 154 with other parts of the district. The bus stops on Rétköz utca can be reached by buses 8, 139 and 239 (the latter only on weekday mornings and afternoons), while the ones on Gazdagréti út are served by bus 153, 153A and 154.

At night Gazdagrét is served by bus line 908.

According to the original plans, Metro line 4 is planned to be extended through Gazdagrét towards Budaörs.
