= The One Million Pound Note =

- Hungarian: Az egymillió fontos bankó
- Directed by: Alexander Korda
- Written by: Alexander Korda
- Based on: The Million Pound Bank Note by Mark Twain
- Produced by: Jenő Janovics
- Starring: Lajos Ujváry; Gyula Nagy; Aladár Ihász
- Cinematography: Arpad Viragh
- Production company: Corvin Film
- Release date: 1916
- Country: Hungary
- Languages: Silent; Hungarian intertitles

The One Million Pound Note (Hungarian: Az egymillió fontos bankó) is a 1916 Hungarian silent comedy film directed by Alexander Korda and starring Lajos Ujváry, Gyula Nagy and Aladár Ihász. It is an adaptation of Mark Twain's 1893 short story The Million Pound Bank Note.

== Cast ==
- Lajos Ujváry
- Gyula Nagy
- Aladár Ihász

== Bibliography ==
- Tudor, Caranfil (2016) [2013]. Dicționar subiectiv al realizatorilor filmului românesc (in Romanian). Polirom. ISBN 978-9734640089.
- Quinlan, David (1983). The Illustrated Guide to Film Directors. Barnes & Noble. ISBN 0389204080.
- Bán, Róbert; Magyar, Bálint; Nemeskürty, István (2011) [1968]. A tizedik múzsa [The tenth muse] (in Hungarian). Minerva/Adamo Books. ISBN 978-615-5184-72-7.
