= Jászai Mari Award =

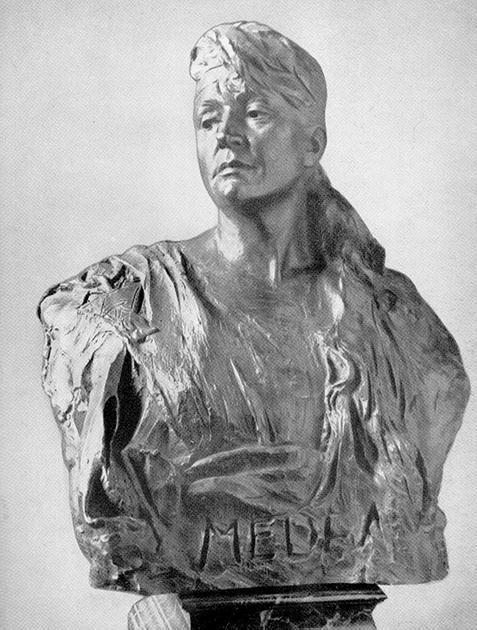
- Mari Jászai as Medea. Bust of the prize's namesake by Sculptor Alajos Stróbl
- Awarded for: Excellence in Performing Arts
- Country: Hungary
- First award: March 15, 1992; 34 years ago

The Jászai Mari Award is a state award, which was created by the Hungarian government in 1953 as an award for theatrical arts. The award was named in honour of the Hungarian actress Mari Jászai.

It originally ran, from 1955 to 1976, and was awarded in April. In 1992 the Hungarian Minister of National Cultural Heritage revived the award.

== Bibliography ==
- Díjasok és kitüntetettek adattára 1948–1980. Összeállította és szerkesztette: Magyar Józsefné. Palmiro Togliatti Megyei Könyvtár, Kaposvár. ISBN 963-7551-57-3
- Csapó Tamásné: Díjasok és kitüntetettek adattára 1981–1990. Megyei és Városi Könyvtár, Kaposvár. ISSN 0237-2312
- MTI Ki kicsoda 2009. Szerk. Hermann Péter. Budapest: Magyar Távirati Iroda. 2008. ISBN 978-963-17-8728-3
