= The £1,000,000 Bank Note and Other New Stories =

Book by Mark Twain

£1,000,000 Bank Note and Other New Stories
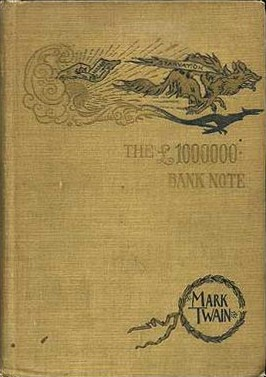
- First edition (US)
- Author: Mark Twain
- Language: English
- Publisher: Charles L. Webster (US); Chatto and Windus (UK)
- Publication date: 1893
- Publication place: United States
- Pages: 311

The £1,000,000 Bank Note and Other New Stories is an 1893 collection of short stories by American writer Mark Twain.

== Background ==
The collection was published in 1893, in a disastrous decade for the United States, a time marked by doubt and waning optimism, rapid immigration, labor problems, and the rise of political violence and social protest.

It was also a difficult time for Twain personally, as he was forced into bankruptcy and devastated by the death of his favorite daughter, Suzy. Yet the title story still brims with confidence and optimism, marking the moment of hope just before Twain turned to the grim stories of his later years.
