= József Katona =

Hungarian writer (1791 - 1830)

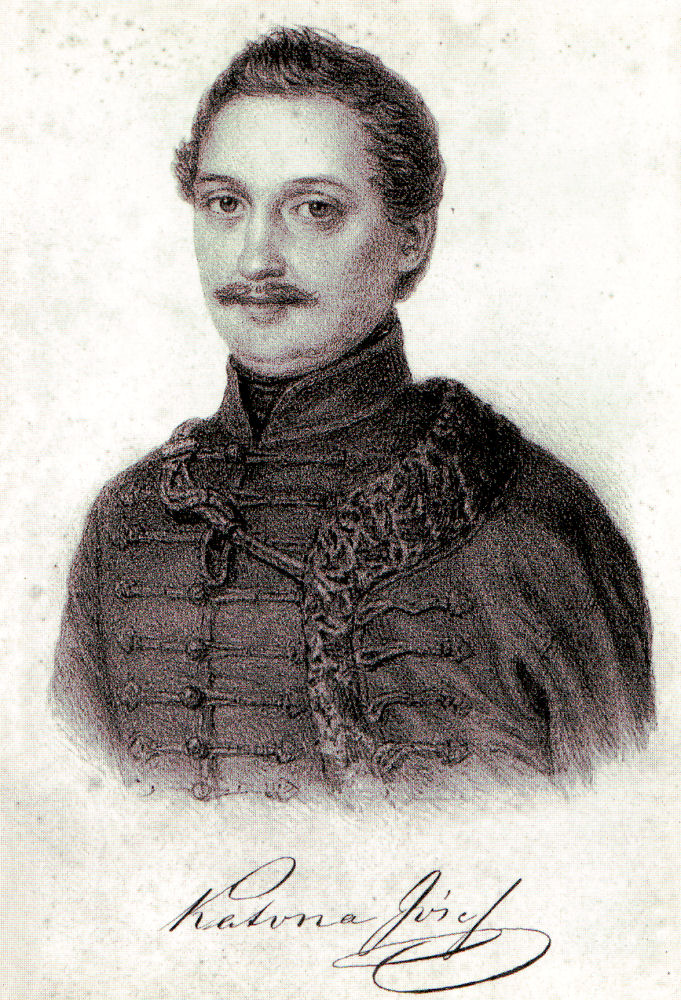
József Katona (Lithograph by Miklós Barabás)

József Katona (11 November 1791, Kecskemét – 16 April 1830, Kecskemét) was a Hungarian playwright and poet, creator of the Hungarian historical tragedy Bánk bán.

== Biography ==
József Katona was born and died in Kecskemét. He studied at the University of Pest as a lawyer, and at the same time, he took part in theatrical life of the capital: he was an actor, he wrote several plays, and he also translated and adapted German melodramatic works for the Hungarian stage. He hopelessly loved the leading Hungarian actress, Mme Déry, but she never recognized this love.

József Katona wrote Bánk bán, his most important drama for a literary competition organized by a Kolozsvár periodical in 1815. The competition required a historical drama with a Hungarian background. The result of the competition was disappointment for Katona: his Bánk Bán was not mentioned at all. He rewrote the play and published it privately in 1820, but it remained unnoticed until the mid-1830s. He returned to his native town Kecskemet. In the last ten years of his life, he wrote no more for the stage. Katona died on April 16, 1830, of a heart attack in front of his office.

== Works ==
- Aubigny Clementina, 1813
- Ziska, 1813
- Jeruzsálem pusztulása, 1814
- A rózsa, vagy a tapasztalatlan légy a pókok között, 1814
- Bánk bán (Hungarian text), 1815; final version, 1819

== Bánk bán ==
The story was about Bánk, the viceroy appointed by King Andrew II (1205–35), while the King was away on his foreign campaigns. Bánk became involved in a conspiracy against the German-born wife of the king; he tries to prevent the rebellion, but finally he is the man who kills the queen. His reason for the murder was political and personal at the same time: Queen Gertrude had taken part in a plot to seduce Bánk’s wife. Bánk's complex character and the deep conflict between duty and personal grief make Bánk Bán one of the best Hungarian dramas. It was written at the time when the intellectuals of the country opposed Habsburg absolutism, and the drama is about mediaeval times when Hungary’s nobility fought against foreign usurpers as well, so the drama had been blacklisted by the government. In 1848, in the evening of March 15, the Hungarian National Theater scheduled a performance of Bánk Bán. It was a symbolic event, part of the Hungarian revolution.

== Bibliography ==
- József Katona: Bánk bán (The viceroy), translated by Bernard Adams and Kálmán Ruttkay; foreword written by László Orosz – Budapest : Akad. K., cop. 2003.

== See also ==
- Bánk bán, opera by Ferenc Erkel
- Bánk Bán (film), a 1914 film by Michael Curtiz
