= The Exile (1915 film) =

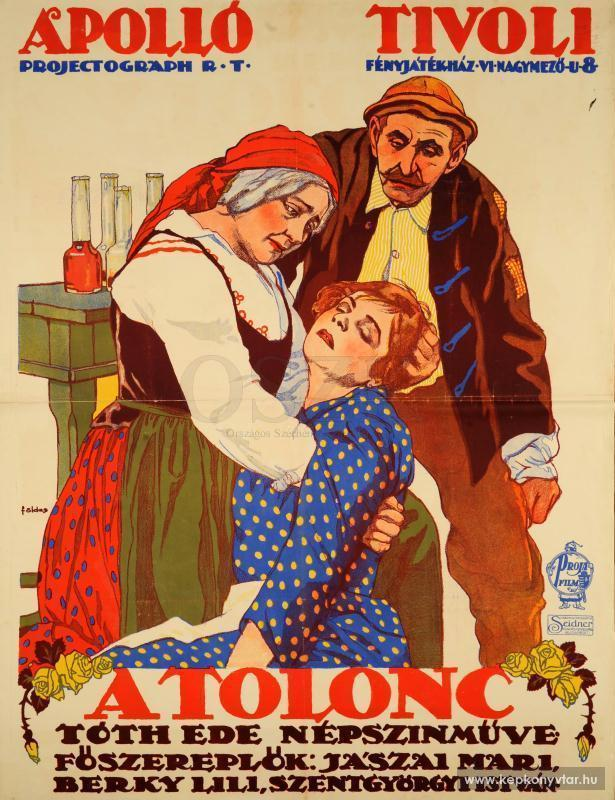
- Directed by: Mihály Kertész; Michael Curtiz
- Written by: Jenő Janovics
- Based on: A tolonc 1876 play by Ede Tóth
- Produced by: Jenő Janovics; Mór Ungerleider
- Starring: Mari Jászai
- Cinematography: László Fekete
- Release date: March 1, 1915
- Running time: 67 minutes
- Country: Hungary
- Language: Silent

The Exile (Hungarian: A tolonc, also known in English by the title The Undesirable) is a 1915 Hungarian silent film directed by Michael Curtiz.

== Cast ==
- Lili Berky as Angyal Liszka
- Victor Varconi as Miklós(as Várkonyi Mihály)
- Mari Jászai as Ördög Sára

== Preservation status ==
Once thought lost, the film was discovered in the Hungarian House cultural center in New York and returned to Hungary for restoration. It was released on DVD and blu-ray in the US on 19 January 2016 by Olive Films under the title The Undesirable.
