= Dezső Szomory =

Hungarian writer and dramatist

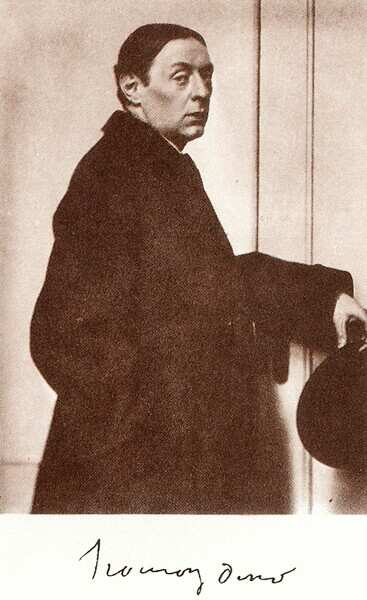
- Born: Moshe Weisz; 2 June 1869; Pest, Hungary, Austria-Hungary
- Died: 30 November 1944 (aged 75); Budapest, Hungary
- Writing career
- Genres: Novel, history play
- Notable works: Hermelin; The Paris Story
- Literary movement: Art Nouveau, naturalism, romanticism

Dezső Szomory (born Moshe Weisz; 2 June 1869 – 30 November 1944) was a Hungarian Jewish writer and dramatist.

== Biography ==
In his history plays and other works, he developed a unique tone and style of Budapest Hungarian; his work has been compared to that of Marcel Proust. He died during the Holocaust while living under Swedish protection in Budapest, suffering "starvation, loneliness, and depression".
