= Erkel =

Erkel may refer to the following.

- Arjan Erkel (born 1970), Dutch medical aid worker
- Ferenc Erkel (1810–1893), Hungarian composer, who wrote the Hungarian national opera Bánk bán
- Sándor Erkel (1846–1900), musician, Ferenc's son
- Erkel, a 1952 Hungarian film

See also Urkel
