= Szomszédok =

- Created by: Ádám Horváth
- Starring: Ferenc Zenthe; Juci Komlós; Ilona Ivancsics; Károly Nemcsák; János Kulka; Éva Örkényi; Anita Ábel; Edit Frajt
- Country of origin: Hungary
- Original language: Hungarian
- No. of episodes: 331

Production
- Running time: 30 minutes

Original release
- Network: Magyar Televízió
- Release: 7 May 1987 – 31 December 1999

Szomszédok (Hungarian pronunciation: [ˈsomseːdok], Neighbours) was a Hungarian television series that ran for 331 episodes between 1987 and 1999 and airing its grand finale on 31 December 1999. The series aired on state-owned broadcaster Magyar Televízió (Hungarian Television) bi-weekly in primetime, on Thursday evenings, during its entire run. It was considered to be a popular series, in 1998 almost 1 million viewers tuned in every month. However, it started losing its popularity at the end of the decade to more versatile programming of foreign television series in other channels and was subsequently ended in 1999.

== Plot ==
The plot revolves around the everyday lives of three families who move to a newly built housing estate in the Gazdagrét (literally "Rich meadow") neighbourhood of Budapest. The Vágási family consists of a young couple, who move from the apartment of a relative into their own apartment. The Takács family is a pensioner couple, whose detached house had to be demolished because of the construction of the M0 motorway. They move in with their granddaughter, Alma. The Mágenheims consist of a middle-aged couple, a doctor husband, a cosmetician wife, and their teenage daughter. The series features other people living in the block of flats, as well.

== Background and analysis ==
The series was a soap opera, dealing with the lives of ordinary people, living and working in or around an average lakótelep (Gazdagréti microdistrict, a socialist housing estate with several thousand flats in Budapest, built in the 1980s). Its characters were explored, over time, in equal depth: ranging from elderly pensioners, busy middle aged professionals, up-and-coming young people, and children growing into their teens. The idea of the series came from BBC's EastEnders but featured less filming locations and focused more on the characters. The series employed more than 2000 actors and extras during its 331-episode run.

Szomszédok is often considered a period piece of sorts, that covers the last few years of the communist era, the rendszerváltás (democratic transition), and nearly a decade of the new market economy in Hungary thereafter.

The series often dealt with the important topics and issues of the day, which affected the lives of everyday people in Hungary. These included politics, the ongoing economical liberalization, and topics such as drug addiction, organized crime, and the introduction of personal computers at home. However, it dealt with political issues very carefully and mildly. Its main characters were quintessential "small people", who were represented in an idealized manner as "good people". Viewers could identify with the characters, as they struggled with the same issues and thoughts, which gave the series its popularity. At the same time the series served as an educational vessel for the government, "teaching" citizens about various topics from expected moral behavior, tax laws to privatization. The characters break the fourth wall at the end of each episode, conveying some moral message or takeaway to the viewers. According to media researcher Tímea Antalóczy, the series therefore possessed significant power to manipulate popular opinion about government actions, as in the majority of its run, the state-funded Magyar Televízió was the sole broadcaster in the country.

Szomszédok featured the first gay character in Hungarian broadcast media, a male hairdresser depicted as a flamboyant, over-the-top gay man, appearing in a smaller, comical recurring role from 1990 to 1993, portrayed by comic actor Imre Bajor, for whom the character brought nationwide popularity.

== Filming locations ==
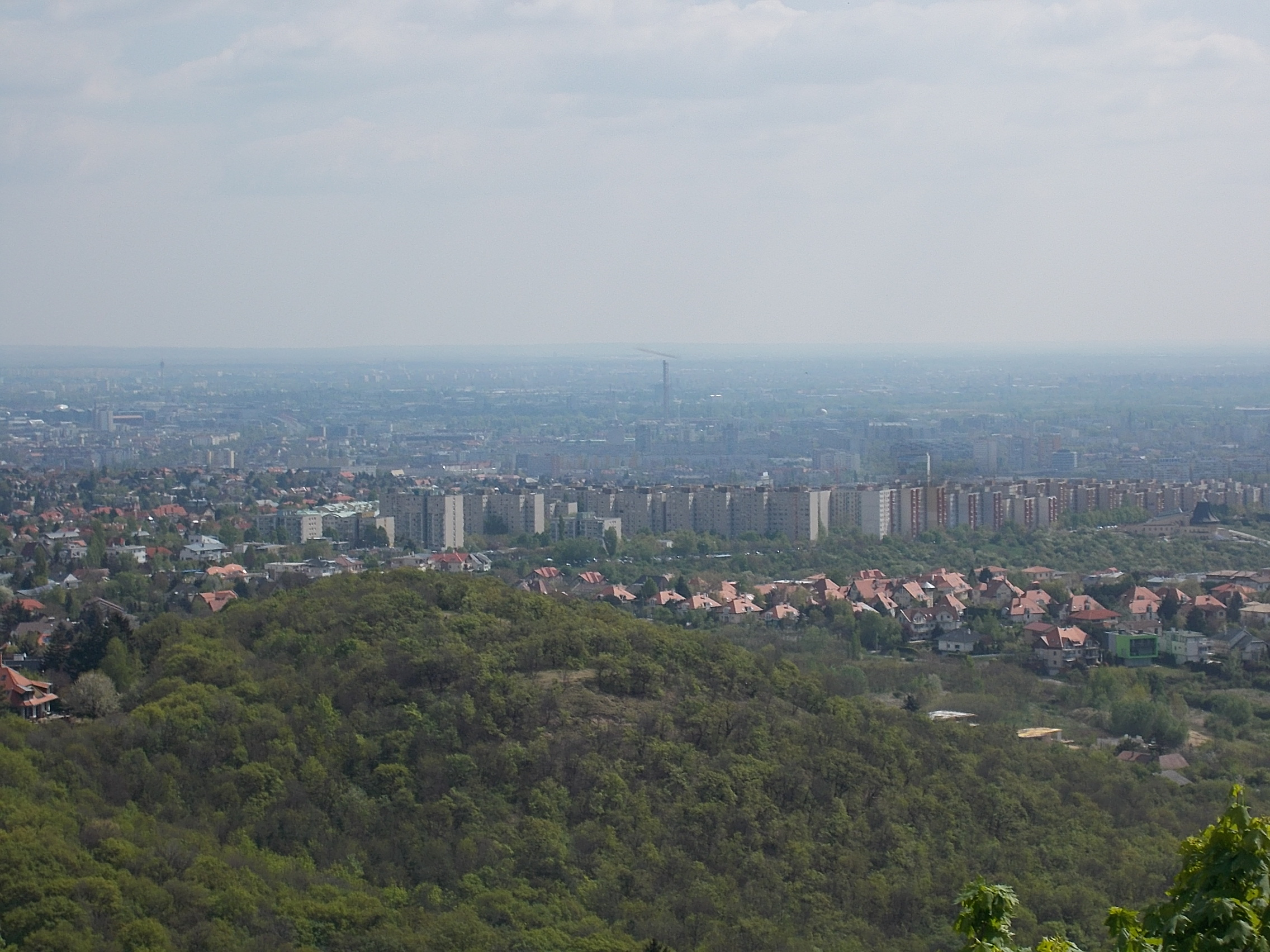
Gazdagrét, where the plot takes place, in 2017

The main filming location of the series was at Csiki-hegyek Street 1, where the production team first rented and then bought a whole floor. Alma's cafe was located at the corner of Alkotás Street és Tartsay Vilmos Street in the District XII.

== Reruns ==
After some time off the air, Szomszédok was rerun on M1 (Hungary's terrestrial broadcast public television channel) until 13 March 2015. The reruns were initially narrated by computer text inserts, mainly to guide those too young to remember the late communist era (e.g. how much bread cost that time or what significance a particular public figure that was mentioned had at the time). The original cast and director of the series publicly protested against this practice, and the information text bubbles were discontinued after a few episodes. Reruns of this programme are now shown on its sister channel, the classic channel M3.

Nowadays, it has only a fraction of its original viewership, as its role has been taken over by Barátok közt, a more vivid and up-to-date daily soap opera produced by the commercial RTL Klub television.
