= Bánk bán (play) =

1819 Hungarian play by József Katona

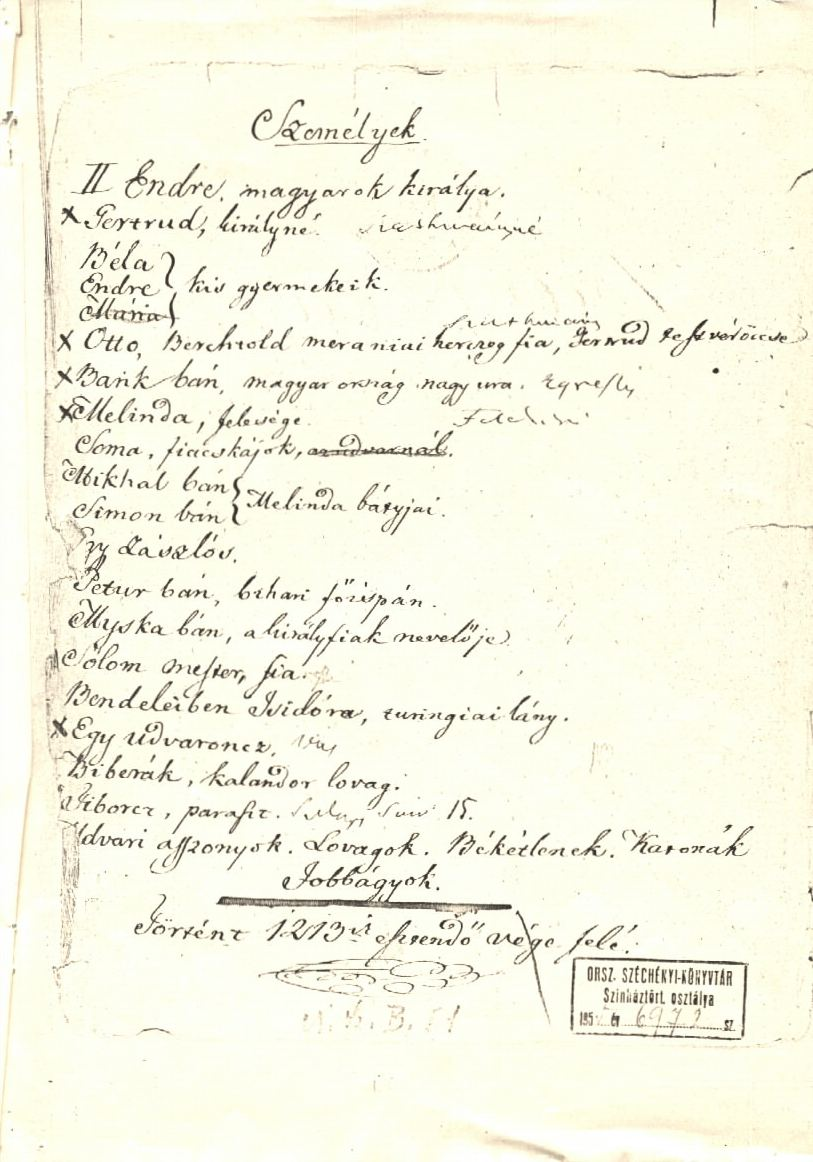
- Manuscript title page
- Written by: József Katona
- Original language: Hungarian

Premiere
- Date premiered: 1819

Bánk bán (or Bánk the Palatine) is a Hungarian play, written by József Katona. It was first produced in 1819.
