= The Schoolmistress (1945 film) =

1945 film

- Directed by: Márton Keleti
- Written by: István Békeffy; Gyula Háy; Andor Zsoldos
- Based on: The Schoolmistress by Sándor Bródy
- Produced by: Andor Zsoldos
- Starring: Éva Szörényi; Pál Jávor; Kálmán Rózsahegyi
- Cinematography: István Eiben
- Edited by: Sándor Zákonyi
- Music by: Tibor Polgár
- Production company: Hunnia Filmstúdió
- Release date: 22 September 1945
- Running time: 85 minutes
- Country: Hungary
- Language: Hungarian

The Schoolmistress (Hungarian: A Tanítónő) is a 1945 Hungarian drama film directed by Márton Keleti and starring Éva Szörényi, Pál Jávor and Kálmán Rózsahegyi . It was entered into the 1947 Cannes Film Festival. It was shot at the Hunnia Studios in Budapest and on location around Ócsa. The film's sets were designed by the art director József Pán. The film was based on the 1908 novel The Schoolmistress by Sándor Bródy, previously adapted into a 1917 silent film of the same title. It was one only two Hungarian films released that year, along with After the Storm, due to the disruption caused by the Battle of Budapest and Soviet occupation.

== Cast ==
- Éva Szörényi as Tóth Flóra, a tanítónõ
- Pál Jávor as ifj. Nagy István
- Kálmán Rózsahegyi as Fõúr
- Zoltán Várkonyi as Tuza Zsolt tanító
- Lili Berky as id. Nagy Istvánné
- Gyula Gózon as Kántor
- Jenő Bodnár as id. Nagy István
- György Dénes as Fõszolgabíró
- Lajos Rajczy as Káplán
- Zsuzsa Bánki as Katica
- Manyi Kiss as Táncosnõ
- Zoltán Makláry as John, a lovász
- László Keleti as Patikus
- Ödön Bárdi as Orvos
- Margit Vágóné as Parasztasszony
- Ferenc Ladányi as Parasztasszony fia
- Emil Fenyö as Jegyzö
- Sándor Peti as Józsi bácsi
- István Dózsa as Napszámos

== Plot ==
The protagonist of the story, based on the play of Sándor Bródy, is Flóra, a female teacher from the capital, who wants to teach in the village in accordance with her professional sense and oath. The local elite, who always playing with cards, prejudiced and obscurantist men don't expect much good from the newcomer, but as soon as she arrives, they immediately start circling around her, trying to impress her by initiating intelligent (intended) conversations, and try to court her. Because of her beauty and purity, it comes into conflict with the local powers and the landowning family of the region. The well-respected people of the village, who arrogantly consider themselves superior to their peers, both Hungarians and minorities, primarily Serbs and Jews, the serf judge, the chaplain, the district doctor, the pharmacist and the law judge, without exception, make slick offers to the young woman again and again, but they are refused so they started blaming her with immoral life style. Aware of her truth, she confronts them, but she can only count on the sympathy of the old priest. István Nagy Jr., a landowner's son living a lecherous, debauched life, fell in love with Flóra, and the love changes him: he stands by her, exposes the lustful hypocrites. Finally, István Nagy Sr. asks for Flóra's hand in marriage for his son.

== Bibliography ==
- Costello, Tom. International Guide to Literature on Film. Bowker-Saur, 1994.
- Cunningham, John. Hungarian Cinema: From Coffee House to Multiplex. Wallflower Press, 2004.
- Kósa, László. A Cultural History of Hungary: In the Nineteenth and Twentieth Centuries. Corvina, 2000.
