= Bengt Ahlfors =

Finnish-Swedish playwright (born 1937)

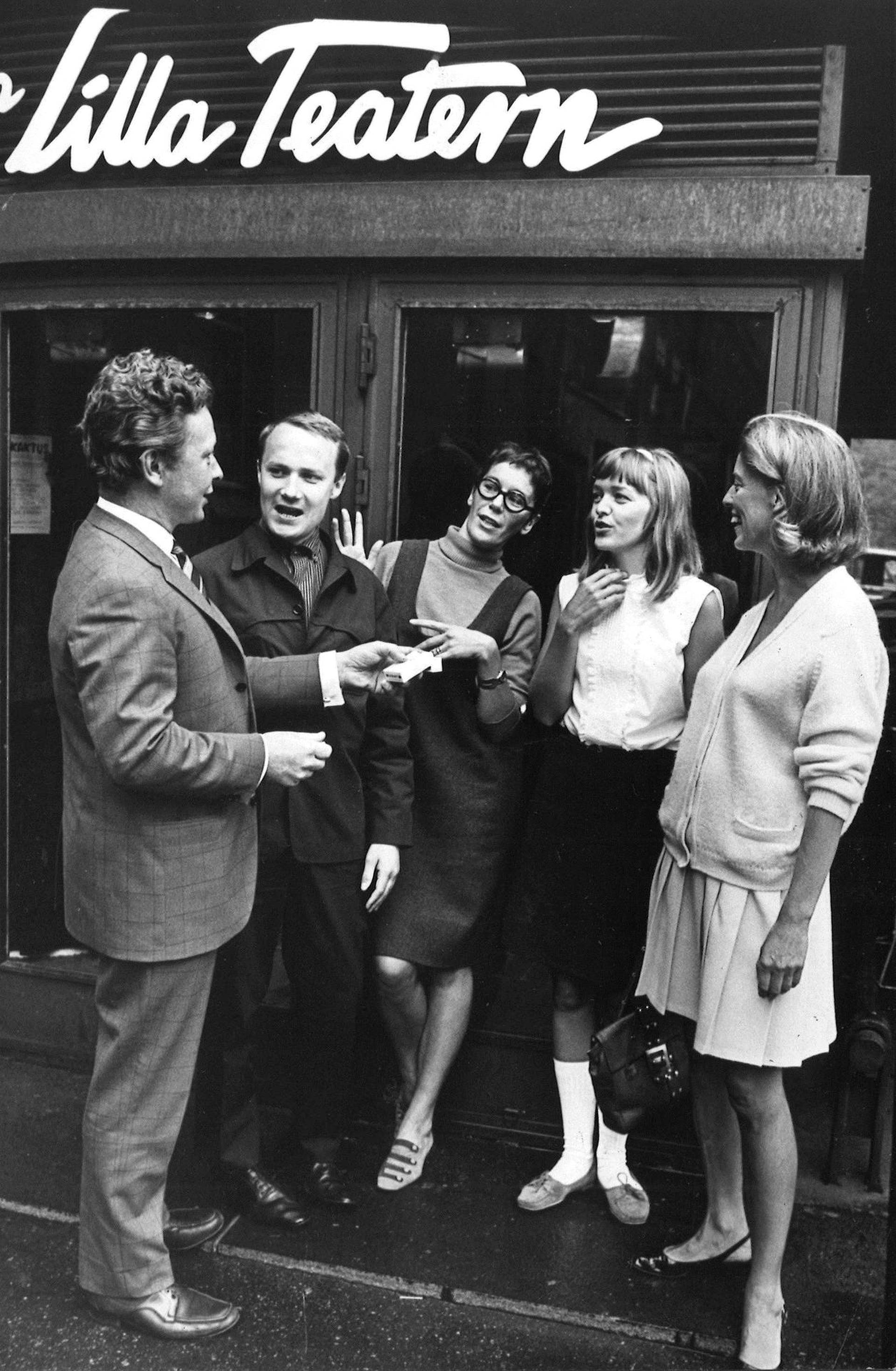
- Bengt Ahlfors, second from left, outside the Lilla Teatern in 1967
- Born: 28 December 1937 (age 88); Helsinki, Finland
- Education: University of Helsinki
- Occupations: author, playwright, director, composer
- Spouse: Ritva Siikala

Bengt Gunnar Richard Ahlfors (born 28 December 1937) is a Finland-Swedish playwright, composer, and former journalist. He is noted for works such as Finns det tigrar i Kongo? (English: Are there tigers in the Congo?), a 1986 play that focused on AIDS pandemic and has since been translated into twenty languages.

== Early life and education ==
Ahlfors was born in Helsinki, Finland on 28 December 1937, to Ejnar Richard Ahlfors and Syster Margareta Reipsar. After graduating from the Nya svenska läroverket in 1957, he studied Swedish literature, Nordic languages, and political science at the University of Helsinki. He initially worked as a journalist and critic for Hufvudstadsbladet and as a theatre critic for Nya Pressen from 1959 to 1962, as well as working in radio and television, before graduating with a degree in philosophy in 1967.

== Theatre career ==
Ahlfors was first exposed to theatre in December 1943, when he saw the play Fågel Blå at Helsinki's Swedish Theatre. He said that, as a result of the experience, "stepped into the fairy tale and actually I have never stepped out".

=== Career at the Lilla Teatern ===
By the time of Ahlfors's graduation in 1967, he had already made his theatrical debut with the musical play I våras in 1963, which he created together with his friend Frej Lindqvist. The play ran at the Lilla Teatern theater, where he also worked as a theatre director from 1963 to 1965. From 1965 to 1966, he served as secretary of the Finland-Swedish Playwrights' Association. In 1968, Ahlfors received the State Prize for Playwrights, along with collaborators Claes Andersson and Johan Bargum.

After graduation, Ahlfors was hired as the director of the Lilla Teatern, where he remained until 1970. During his three years there, he directed plays about the Soviet invasion of Czechoslovakia (including his 1968 play Tjeckoslovakien), the regime of the Greek Colonels, and also a 1970 an adaptation of Jules Verne's Around the World in 80 Days titled Jorden runt på 80 dagar, which was åroduced in many theatres in Europe and USA.

=== Villa Biaudet and Helsinki Swedish Theatre (1970s) ===
After working at the Lilla Teatern, Ahlfors was a scholar at Villa Biaudet from 1970 until 1973, during which time he also served on the board of the Society of Swedish Authors in Finland (1971–1975). He later became artistic director of the Helsinki Swedish Theatre from 1975 to 1978. He had also previously worked as a director at the theatre from 1966 to 1967.

In this role, he sparked controversy by making an operetta version of the national poet Runeberg's Fänrik Ståls sägner in 1976 with Frej Lindqvist, which was criticised as unsuitable for rendering as an operetta. During this period, he also published a book of poetry, Sänger & dikter (Songs & Poems) in 1971, a memoir titled Fragment av en barndom (Fragments of a Childhood) in 1978, and a diary from his time at the theatre, Stigzeliuska rummet (The Stigzelius Room), in 1980.

=== Release of Finns det tigrar i Kongo? (1986) ===
In 1986, Ahlfors debuted his play Finns det tigrar i Kongo? (English: Are there tigers in the Congo?), which he wrote together with Johan Bargum. The played focused on the AIDS pandemic and fears surrounding infection with the disease and prejudices against AIDS carriers. Finns det tigrar i Kongo? has been translated into more than 20 different languages.

The play has been described as among the first works in Finnish theater to touch upon the AIDS pandemic. The play has reportedly been performed in over 30 countries. Ahlfors received the Lea Award of the Finnish playwrights association in 1988 for Finns det tigrar i Kongo?.

=== Later career (1990s-present) ===
He received an award from the Ministry of Education and Culture in 1993. In 2005, he debuted the play 1945, which focused on Finland's history during World War II.

Among his most successful plays (also translated into English) are "A Theatre Comedy", "Ashes and Aquavit", "The Last Cigar" and the musical "Stolen Happiness". His most recent play as of late 2021, Ahlfors & Siikala, focused on the relationship between him and his wife, Ritva Siikala. In 2024, the Azerbaijan State Theatre of Young Spectators announced it would hold a performance of a translation of Ahlfors' play "The Illusionists".

== Personal life ==
Ahlfors has been married to the Finnish director Ritva Siikala since 1968. They have one daughter together who was born in 1968, and adopted a son from Ethiopia in 1972, and as of 2021 have seven grandchildren.
