= The Schoolmistress (1917 film) =

1917 film

- Directed by: Jenö Janovics
- Written by: Mihály Fekete
- Based on: The Schoolmistress by Sándor Bródy
- Produced by: Jenö Janovics
- Starring: Lili Berky; Victor Varconi; István Szentgyörgyi
- Cinematography: László Fekete
- Production company: Transsylvania Filmgyár
- Release date: 8 October 1917
- Country: Hungary
- Languages: Silent; Hungarian intertitles

The Schoolmistress (Hungarian: A tanítónö) is a 1917 Hungarian silent drama film directed by Jenö Janovics and starring Lili Berky, Victor Varconi and István Szentgyörgyi. It is based on the 1908 novel of the same title by Sándor Bródy, later made into the 1945 film The Schoolmistress. It was produced during the First World War when Hungary was still part of the Austro-Hungarian Empire.

== Cast ==
- Lili Berky as Tóth Flóra tanítónõ
- István Szentgyörgyi as id. Nagy István
- Victor Varconi as ifjabb Nagy István
- Elemér Hetényi as Járásorvos
- Gyula Dezséri Plébános
- Alajos Mészáros as Tanító
- Hugó Kozma as Káplán
- János Németh as Patikus
- Aranka Laczkó Nagyasszony
- Ilonka Nagy as Kántorkisasszony
- József Berky
- Vanda Berlányi
- Mihály Bérczy
- Rózsi Fajk
- Ilonka Gazda
- Margit Miklóssy
- Adorján Nagy
- Gyula Nagy
- Mátyás Némedy
- Katinka Papp
- Ödön Réthely

== Bibliography ==
- Szinnyei, József. Magyar írók élete és munkái: Brediceanu Kajusz-Czeglédy Rózsika. Magyar Könyvtárosok és Levéltárosok Egyesülete, 1939.
- Waldman, Harry. Missing Reels: Lost Films of American and European Cinema. McFarland, 2000.
