= Lili Berky =

Hungarian actress (1886–1958)

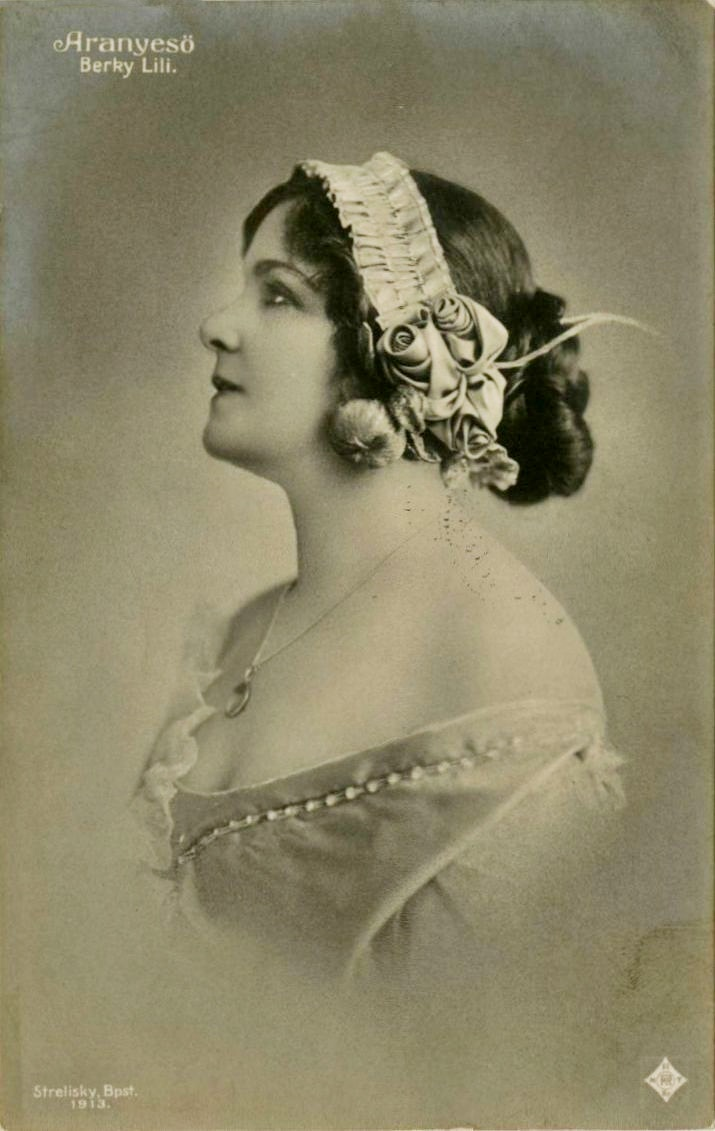
- Born: Amália Terézia Berky; March 15, 1886; Győr, Austria-Hungary
- Died: February 5, 1958 (aged 71); Budapest, Hungary
- Resting place: Fiume Road Graveyard
- Spouse: Gyula Gózon

Lili Berky (born Amália Terézia Berky) was a Hungarian actress. She was born on 15 March 1886 in Győr, Austria-Hungary, and died on 5 February 1958. She was married to Gyula Gózon.

== Selected filmography ==
- The Yellow Foal (1913)
- White Nights (1916)
- Struggling Hearts (1916)
- Tales of the Typewriter (1916)
- Miska the Magnate (1916)
- The Schoolmistress (1917)
- Man of Gold (1919)
- Romance in Budapest (1933)
- The New Relative (1934)
- It Happened in March (1934)
- Cornflower (1934)
- Romance of Ida (1934)
- The Dream Car (1934)
- Villa for Sale (1935)
- The Empress and the Hussar (1935)
- I Can't Live Without Music (1935)
- Three Dragons (1936)
- Danube Rendezvous (1936)
- Modern Girls (1937)
- Beauty of the Pusta (1937)
- A Girl Sets Out (1937)
- Sister Maria (1937)
- Viki (1937)
- Duel for Nothing (1940)
- Matthew Arranges Things (1940)
- Sarajevo (1940)
- Rózsafabot (1940)
- The Chequered Coat (1940)
- Mirage by the Lake (1940)
- Seven Plum Trees (1940)
- Left-Handed Angel (1941)
- Kerek Ferkó (1943)
- Black Dawn (1943)
- Muki (1944)
- The Schoolmistress (1945)
- Without Lies (1946)
- A Strange Marriage (1951)
- The Bridge of Life (1956)
