= Prefect (Romania) =

Romanian government office

A prefect (Romanian: prefect) in Romania represents the Government in each of the country's 41 counties, as well as the Municipality of Bucharest.

== History ==
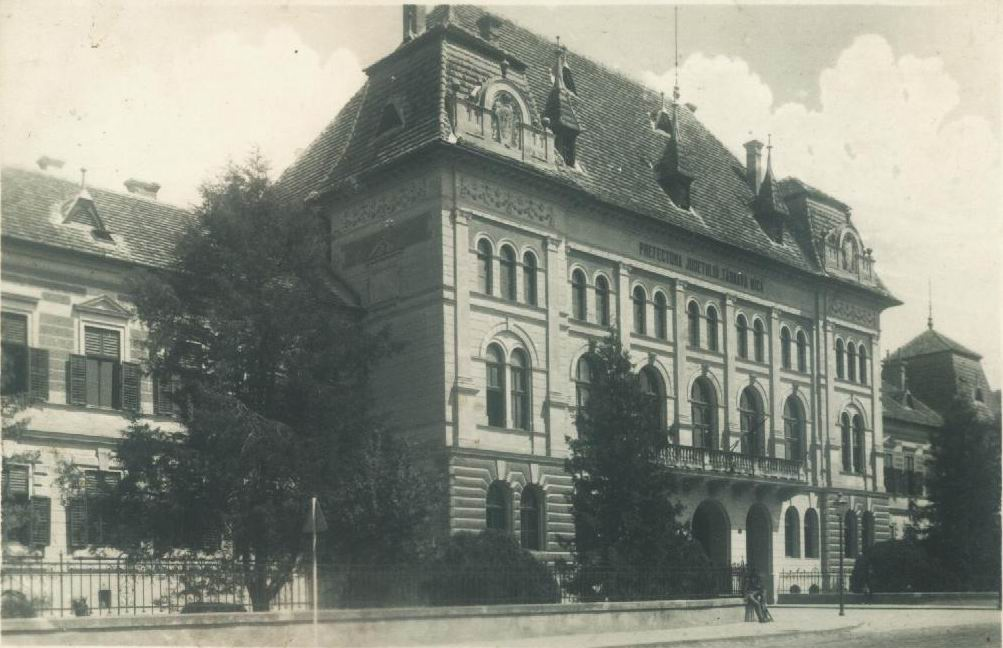
The prefecture of the former Târnava-Mică County in Diciosânmartin (now Târnăveni)

The office traces its origin to the ispravnici who held office in the Danubian Principalities before these united in 1859. Two laws of 1864 introduced the office of prefect into the new Romanian state, modelled on the French equivalent. Another law was enacted in 1872, while an 1883 law reduced the prefect's role to executing Government decisions. The office was strengthened by law in 1892; it was provided that "at the head of each county there is a prefect...named by royal decree, upon the recommendation of the Minister of the Interior...he represents the executive power in the entire district placed under his administration". The 1925 law for administrative unity regarded the prefect as the representative of the central authorities, with power to control local officials. Named by royal decree following a recommendation of the Interior Minister, the prefect, aside from fulfilling general conditions for civil servants, had to be at least thirty years of age and to have completed a state-recognised university. Prefects already in office for at least a year were exempt.

A 1929 law was the first to distinguish between appointed and elected local authorities. The prefect was no longer the head of the county administration, but the "representative of the government", charged with exercising "control and supervision over all local authorities". The central authorities named him; he represented executive power. The law created a new institution, the county administrative commission, and the prefect was its president. In 1936, a law was adopted enhancing the prefect's powers: he was now head of the county administration, supervising all cultural institutions and public services. He was also chief of police and of the gendarmerie. In 1938, following the imposition of a royal dictatorship by King Carol II (see National Renaissance Front), the counties' administrative autonomy was abolished in favour of the larger ţinuturi. The prefect, named by royal decree, became a career bureaucrat, able to name mayors of rural and non-resident urban communes and to designate ex officio members of the town councils. Under the dictatorship, prefects were active-duty military officers with the rank of colonel or higher.

From 1940 to 1944, during the Ion Antonescu dictatorship and based on a decree-law of September 1940, the prefect was restored as a public functionary, with the counties again having their own juridical personality, income and budget. The prefect's role as representative of the Government was also brought back. The new prefects were named on September 20, and in forty-five counties, they belonged to the Iron Guard. This formed part of the movement's strategy of gaining control over government offices and using them for repressive purposes under the National Legionary State regime. In 1949, early in the Communist regime, the prefecture was transformed into a "provisional committee". The following September, when the counties were abolished, the office of prefect was done away with.

Following the Romanian Revolution of 1989, a 1990 law brought back the prefecture as an "organ of state administration with general competences", composed of one prefect, two deputy prefects, one secretary and seven members. The law specified how the institution should be organised as well as its attributes. The office—one that represented the Government locally and headed devolved public services of ministries and other agencies—was enshrined in the constitution passed by referendum in December 1991, as well as by a law that year and in 2001. Further legislative reform began with the 2004 Law on the Prefect. This de-politicised the office of prefect and deputy prefect, making them high public functionaries who occupy their positions through competitive selection. It also changed the office of general secretary ("director-general" from 1991 to 1997) into that of deputy prefect, so that each prefect was assisted by two deputy prefects, a number cut to one in 2010. In 2021, the prefects' status was changed to that of public dignitaries, allowing them to be members of political parties. At the same time, the office of general secretary was restored.

== Attributes ==
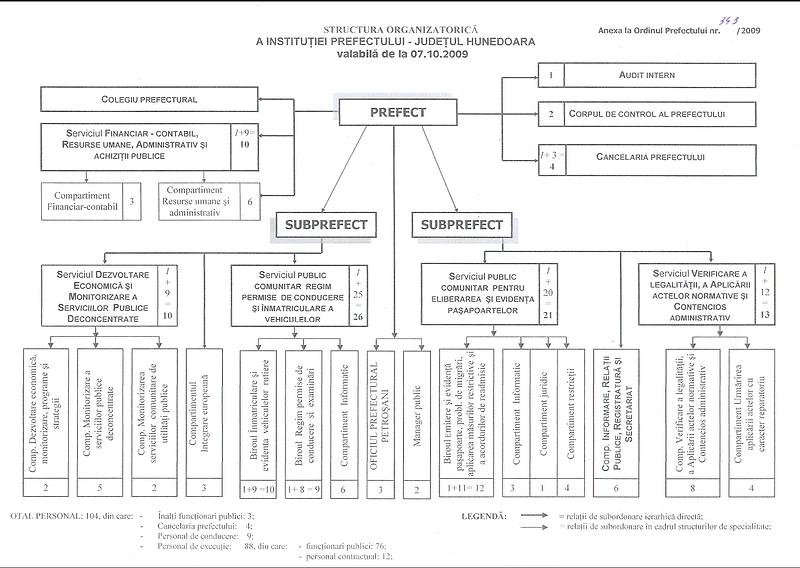
Organisational chart for the Hunedoara County Prefecture (2009)

The main attributes of prefects are defined at Article 123 of the Constitution of Romania:

(1) The Government names one prefect in each county and in the Municipality of Bucharest.
(2) The prefect is the representative of the Government at the local level and heads the devolved public services of the ministries and of the other organs of the central public administration in the administrative-territorial units.
(3) The prefect's attributes are defined through organic law.
(4) Between prefects, on the one hand, and local councils and town halls, as well as county councils and their presidents, on the other hand, no subordinate relations exist.
(5) The prefect may challenge, before an administrative court, an act of the county council, or a local council or of a mayor, in the event he considers the act illegal. The act thus challenged is suspended de jure.

Section 4 of this article was added in 2003; the remainder dates to 1991. The prefect's role is further defined by a 2004 law, modified by decrees in 2004 and 2005, and by a law in 2006. Among the roles of the office is to ensure that the Constitution and laws are followed; to help fulfil the Government's programme; to help maintain social peace; to cooperate with local authorities in order to set development priorities; to verify the legality of acts done by the county or local councils and mayors; to ensure emergency preparedness; to promote integration into the European Union; to decide with which similar institutions in Romania or abroad to cooperate; to ensure that national minorities are able to communicate with Government institutions in localities where minorities make up over 20% of the population. The principles that are supposed to guide the prefect are legality, impartiality and objectivity; transparency and free access to public information; efficiency; responsibility; professionalism; and a citizen-oriented attitude. The Interior Ministry is the principal allocator of prefectures' budgets, while their activity is coordinated by the Prime Minister and they are subordinate to the Government.

Each prefect leads a prefectural college; this is a consultative body meant to assist in coordinating the activities of devolved public services. In particular, it is meant to analyse the activity of devolved services and propose measures to improve it; to identify where multiple services can cooperate; to decide on measures necessary to implement policies adopted at the national level; to organise joint activities of public services in order to deal with special situations; and to analyse what measures should be taken for there to be a unified system of managing information or material, financial or human resources.

Each prefecture also has a chancellery, composed of a director, an adviser to the prefect, an adviser on Roma issues, and a chief of cabinet. The chancellery ensures the prefect's work runs smoothly; analyzes social and economic data; organizes meetings between the prefect and civil society groups, unions, management, and political parties; drafts press releases; organizes informational meetings and press conferences, and informs the public about the prefect's activities; maintains the prefecture's website; and drafts quarterly progress reports on the Government's Roma strategy. The Roma adviser, introduced by a 2001 decree, creates partnerships leading to programmes for improving Romas' situation; increases the administrative capacity of institutions charged with implementing the Roma strategy; improves Romas' access to housing, water, electricity, and heating; ensures access to medical care; helps include Roma in the labour force; and works to provide access to preschools and elementary schools, as well as to high schools and universities.

Prefects and deputy prefects (subprefecţi) hold regular public audiences. Prefectures certify foreign documents in accordance with the 1961 Hague Convention Abolishing the Requirement of Legalisation for Foreign Public Documents; issue and renew driver's licenses and register motor vehicles; issue ordinary passports; verify the legality of documents; help conduct elections and referendums; assist in the process of restoring property seized under the Communist regime; and, through a series of committees, perform various other duties. Prefectures may have other offices besides those in the county seat, responsible for surrounding areas: for instance, the Caraș-Severin County Prefecture, aside from its headquarters in Reșița, has offices in Caransebeș and Oravița, while the Neamț County Prefecture in Piatra Neamț has offices in Roman and Târgu Neamț.

== Prefecture buildings ==
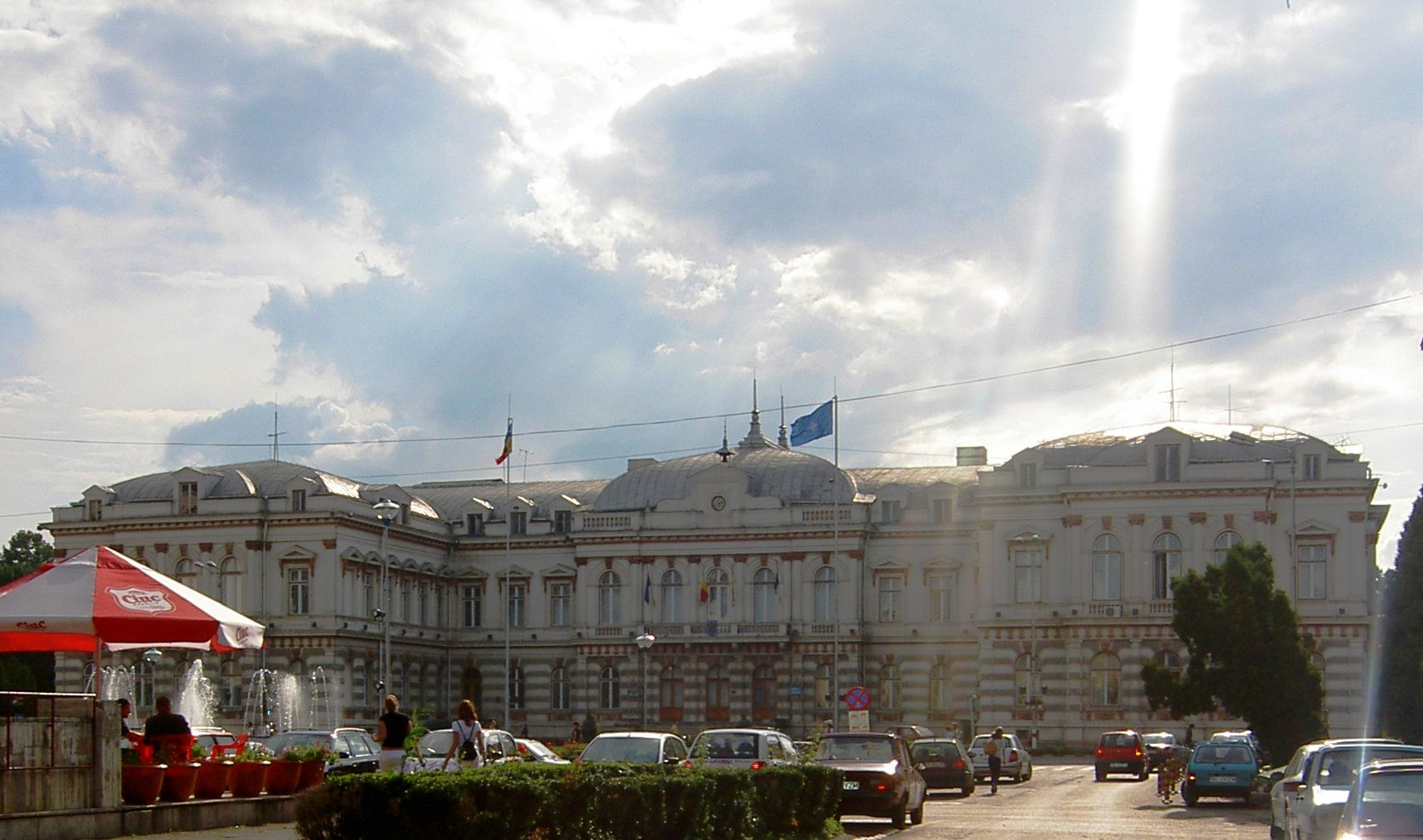
Bacău County, Bacău

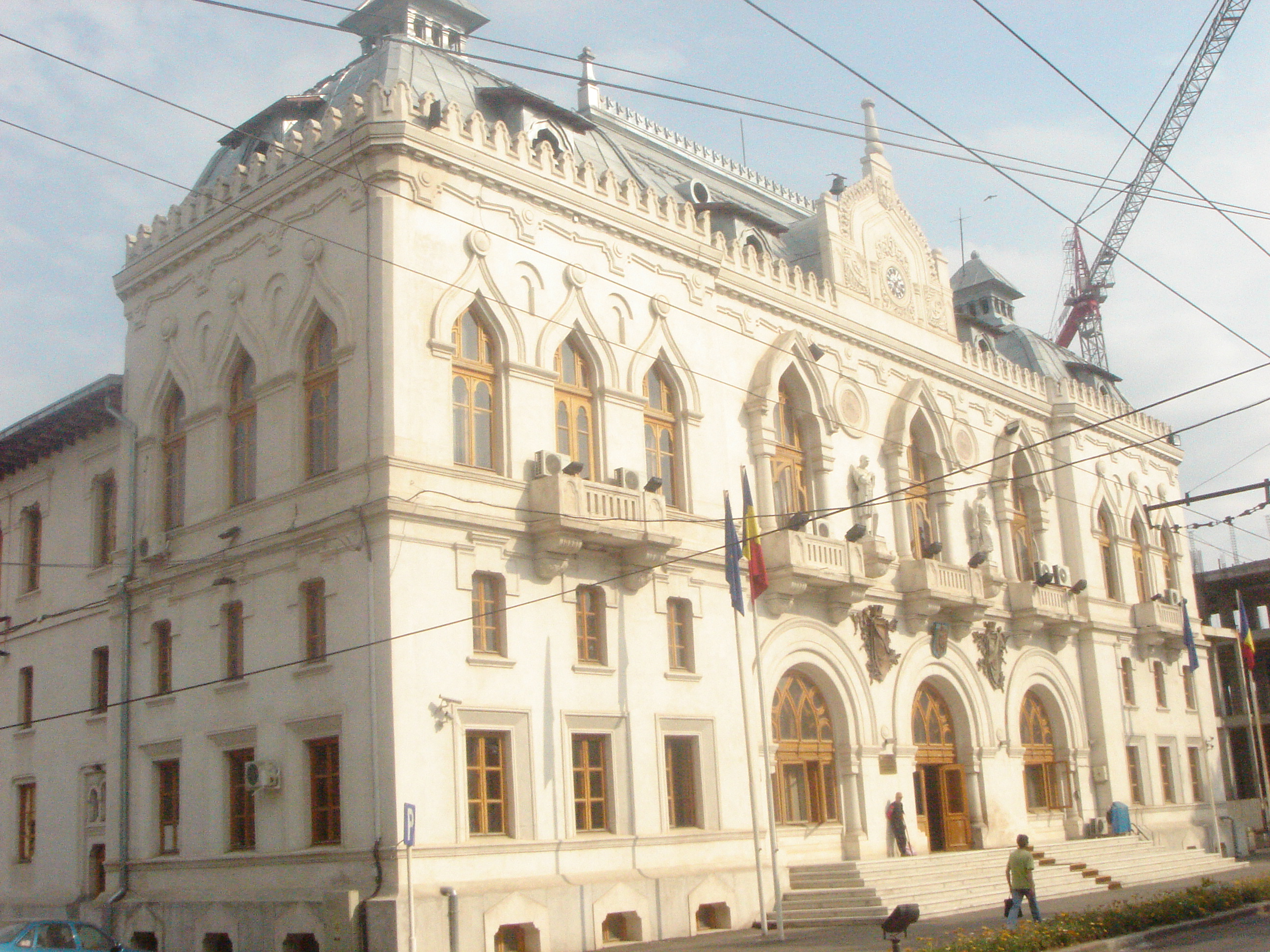
Galați County, Galați

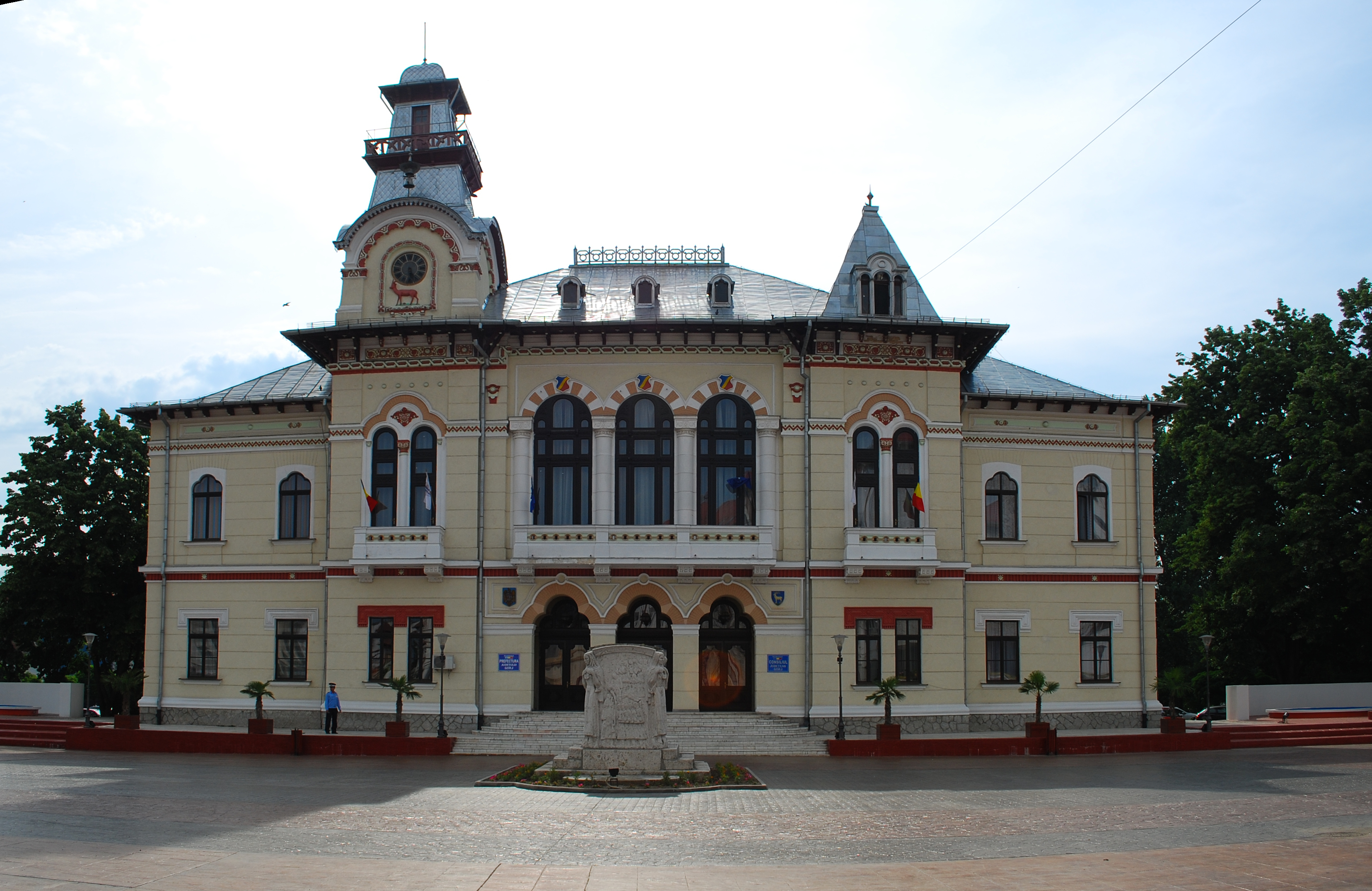
Gorj County, Târgu Jiu

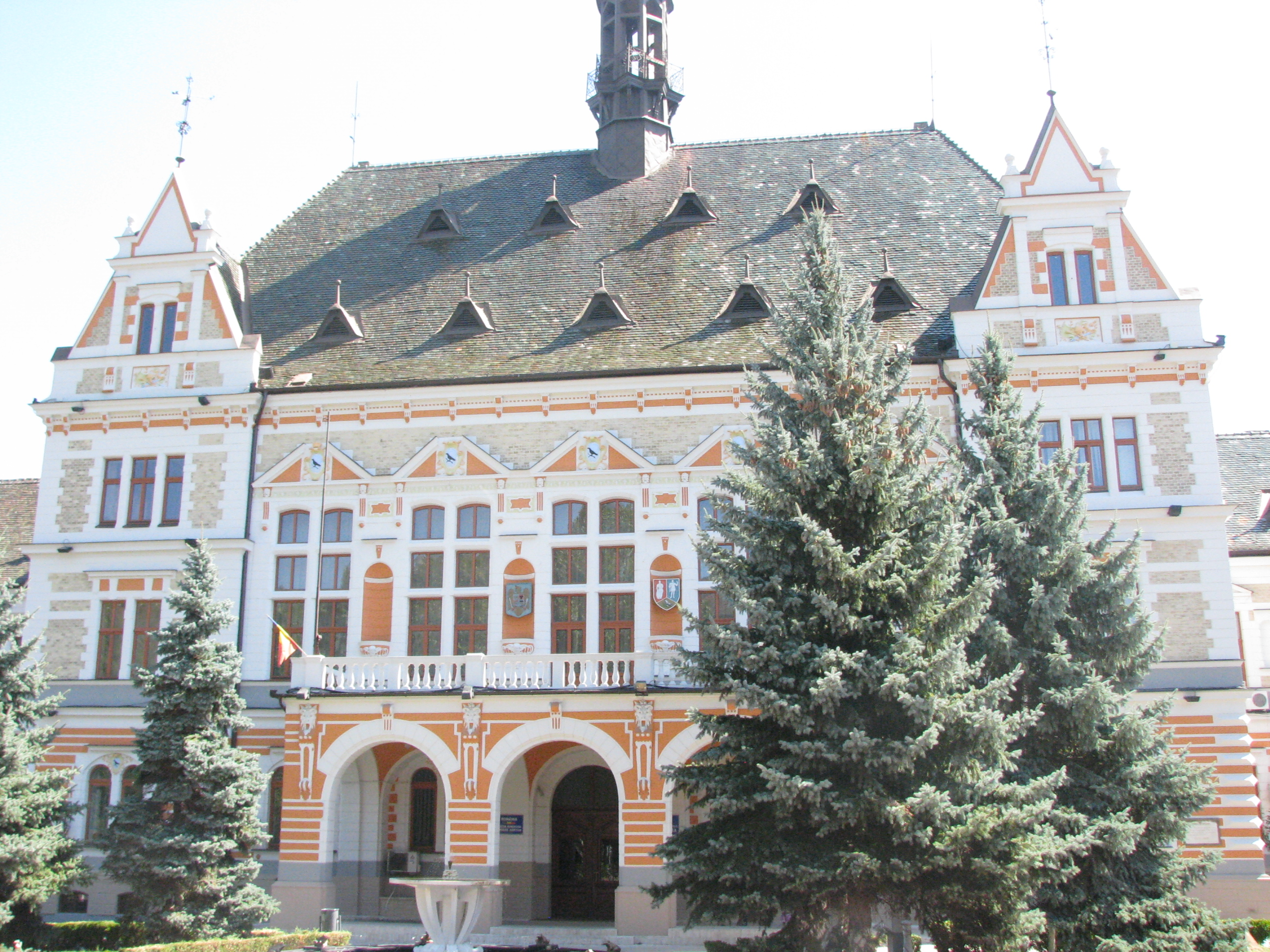
Hunedoara County, Deva

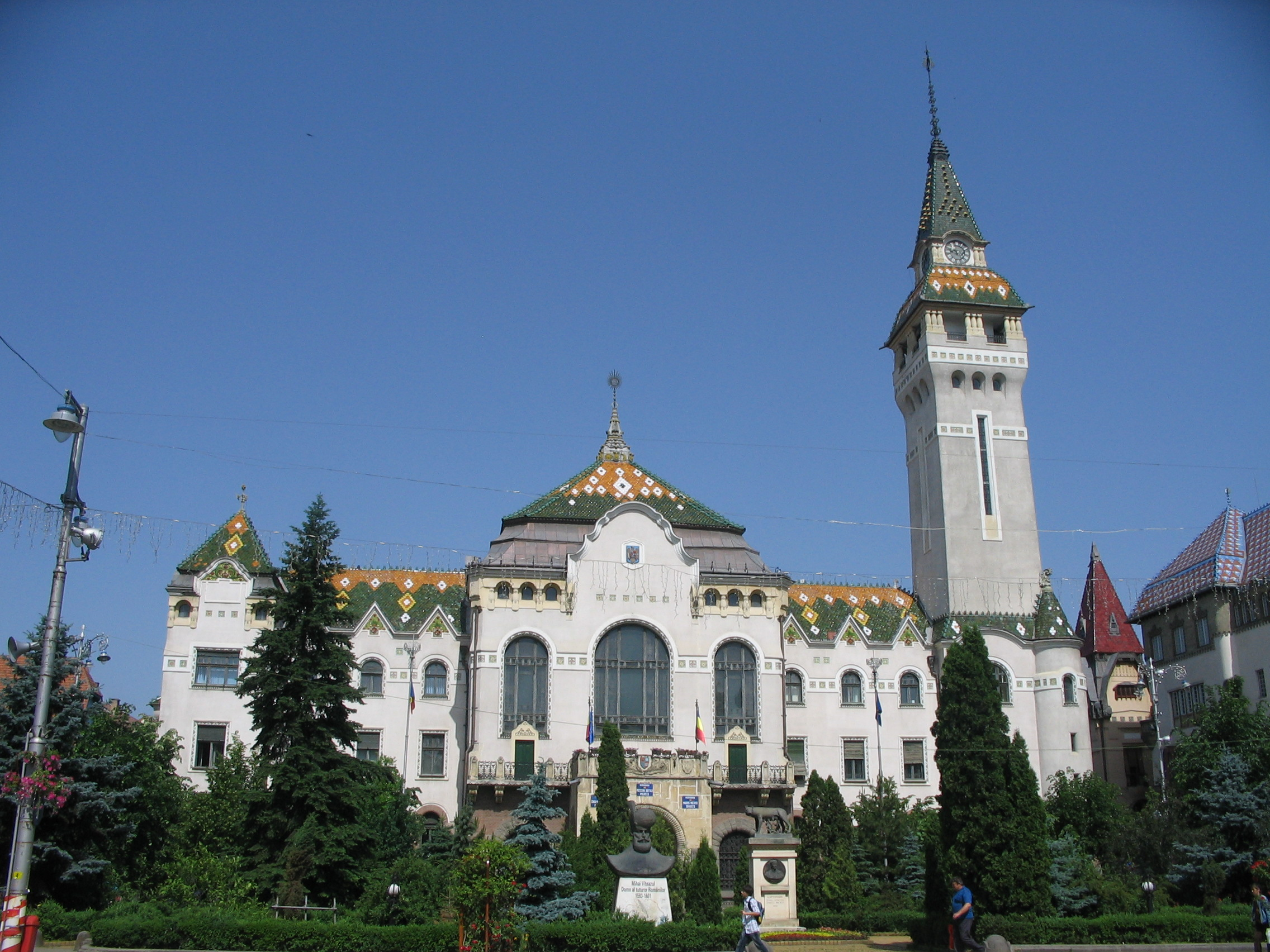
Mureș County, Târgu Mureș

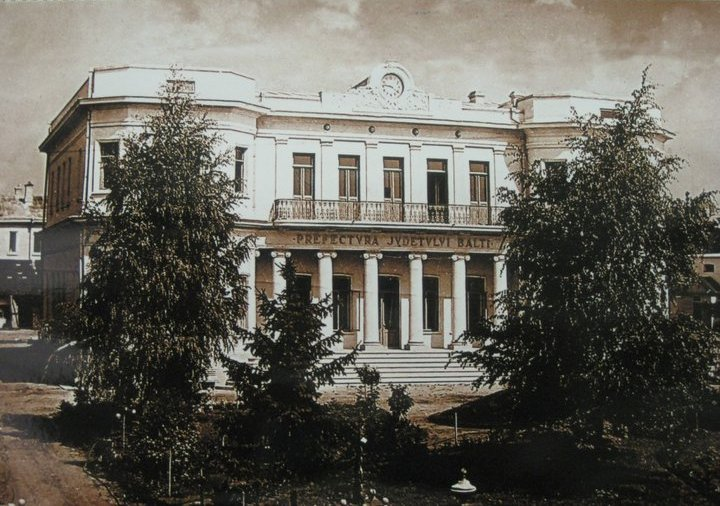
Bălți County, Bălți (now in Moldova)

== See also ==
- List of prefects of Bucharest
