= Odorhei County =

Județul Odorhei
- County (Județ)
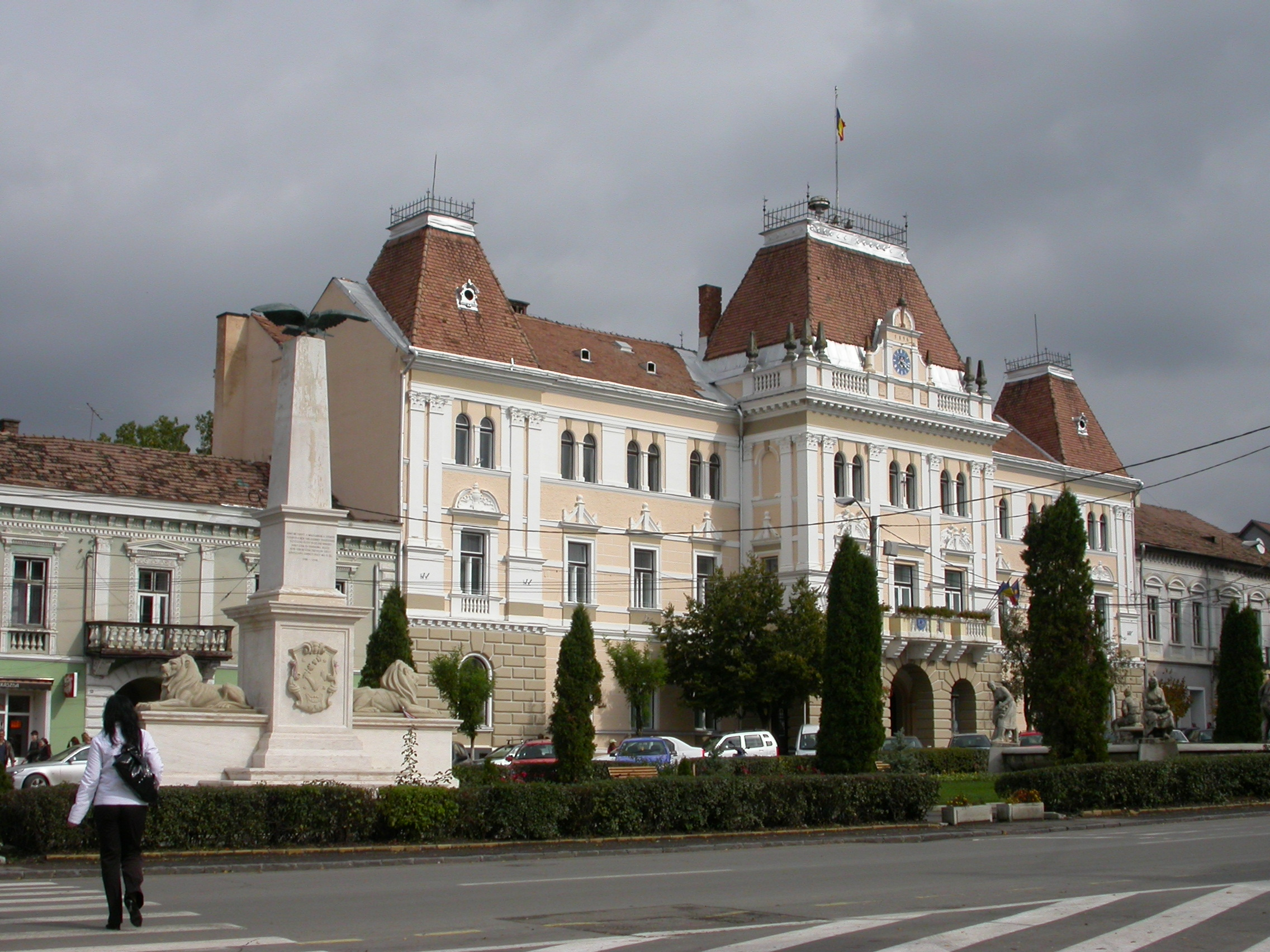
- The Odorhei County Prefecture's building from the interwar period, currently Odorheiu Secuiesc city hall.

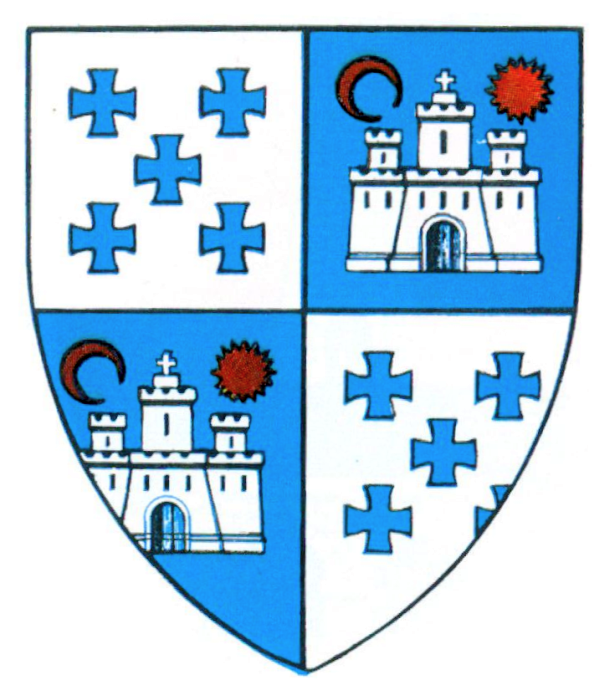
- Coat of arms

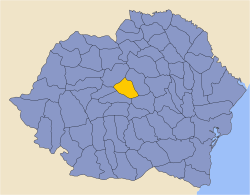
- Country: Romania
- Historic region: Transylvania
- Capital city (Reședință de județ): Odorheiu Secuiesc
- Established: 1925
- Ceased to exist: Administrative reform of 1950

Area
  - Total: 2,977 km^{2} (1,149 sq mi)

Population (1930)
  - Total: 130,282
  - Density: 43.76/km^{2} (113.3/sq mi)
- Time zone: UTC+2 (EET)
  - Summer (DST): UTC+3 (EEST)

Odorhei County was a county (Romanian: județ) in the Kingdom of Romania. The county seat was Odorheiu Secuiesc.

== Geography ==
Odorhei County covered 2,977 km^{2} and was located in central part of Greater Romania, in eastern part of the historical region of Transylvania. It was bordered by Târnava-Mică County and Târnava-Mare County to the west and southwest, Mureș County to the north, Ciuc County to the east, and Brașov County and Trei-Scaune County to the south. Odorhei county was abolished in the administrative reforms of September 6, 1950. Currently, the territory that comprised the greater part of Odorhei County is now part of Harghita County, with some territory now belonging to the present-day counties of Covasna and Mureș.

=== History ===
Prior to World War I, the territory of the county belonged to Austria-Hungary and was identical with the Udvarhely County of the Kingdom of Hungary. The territory of Odorhei County was transferred to Romania from Hungary as successor state to Austria-Hungary in 1920 under the Treaty of Trianon. After the administrative unification law in 1925, the name of the county remained as it was, but the territory was reorganized.

In 1938, King Carol II promulgated a new Constitution, and subsequently he had the administrative division of the Romanian territory changed. 10 ținuturi (approximate translation: "lands") were created (by merging the counties) to be ruled by rezidenți regali (approximate translation: "Royal Residents") - appointed directly by the King - instead of the prefects. Odorhei County became part of Ținutul Mureș.

In 1940, the county was transferred back to Hungary with the rest of Northern Transylvania under the Second Vienna Award. Beginning in 1944, Romanian forces with Soviet assistance recaptured the ceded territory and reintegrated it into Romania, re-establishing the county. Romanian jurisdiction over the county per the Treaty of Trianon was reaffirmed in the Paris Peace Treaties, 1947. The county was disestablished by the communist government of Romania in 1950, and not re-established in 1968 when Romania restored the county administrative system.

== Administrative organization ==
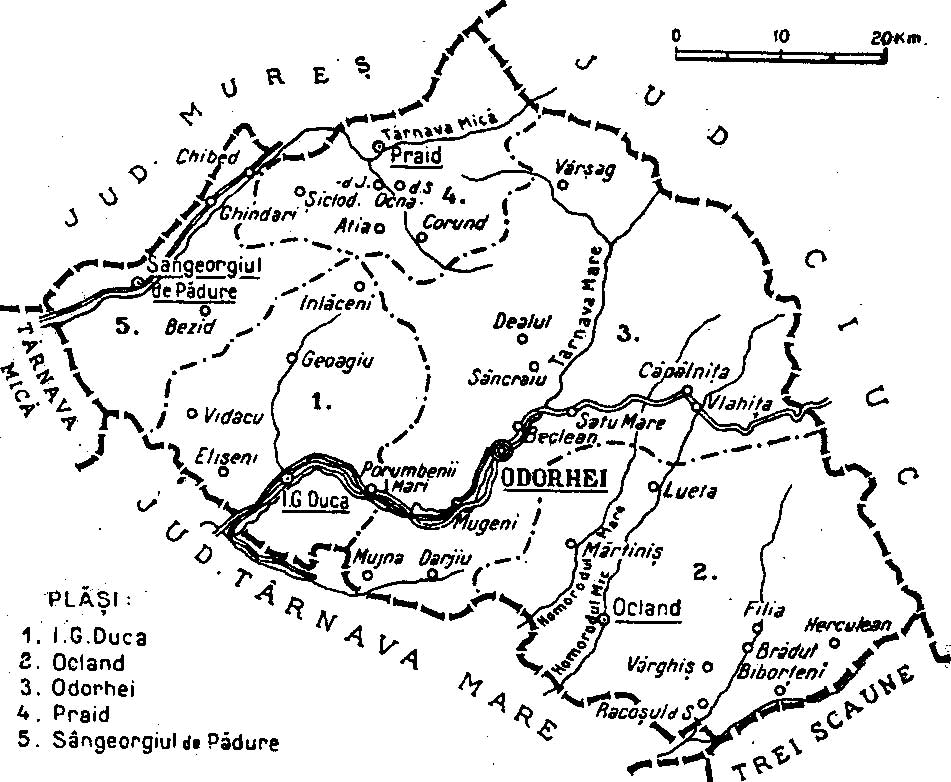
Map of Odorhei County as constituted in 1938.

Administratively, Odorhei County was divided into four districts (plăși):

1. Plasa Cristur, headquartered at Cristuru Secuiesc
2. Plasa Ocland, headquartered at Ocland
3. Plasa Odorhei, headquartered at Odorheiu Secuiesc
4. Plasa Praid, headquartered at Praid

Later, the county was reorganized from the administrative and territorial point of view into five districts:

1. Plasa Sângeorgiu de Pădure, headquartered at Sângeorgiu de Pădure (with 20 villages)
2. Plasa I.G. Duca, headquartered at I.G. Duca (with 33 villages)
3. Plasa Ocland, headquartered at Ocland (with 30 villages)
4. Plasa Odorhei, headquartered at Odorhei (with 49 villages)
5. Plasa Praid, headquartered at Praid (with 8 villages)

== Population ==
According to the Romanian census of 1930 the population of Odorhei County was 130,282, of which 91.6% were ethnic Hungarians, 4.9% ethnic Romanians, 2.0% Romani, 1.0% Jews, and 0.4% Germans, as well as other minorities. Classified by religion: 37.4% were Reformed (Calivinist), 34.6% were Roman Catholic, 20.6% Unitarian, 3.7% Orthodox Christian, 1.1% Jewish, and 1.1% Greek-Catholic, as well as other minorities.

=== Urban population ===
In 1930 the urban population of Odorhei County was 8,518, which included 81.3% Hungarians, 11.3% Romanians, 3.3% Jews, 2.0% Germans, and 1.4% Roma by ethnicity, as well as other minorities. The religious mix of the urban population was 51.3% Roman Catholic, 25.9% Reformed, 8.0% Eastern Orthodox, 5.3% Unitarian, 3.7% Jewish, 3.3% Greek-Catholic, and 1.9% Lutheran, as well as other minorities.
