= Küküllő County =

County of the Kingdom of Hungary

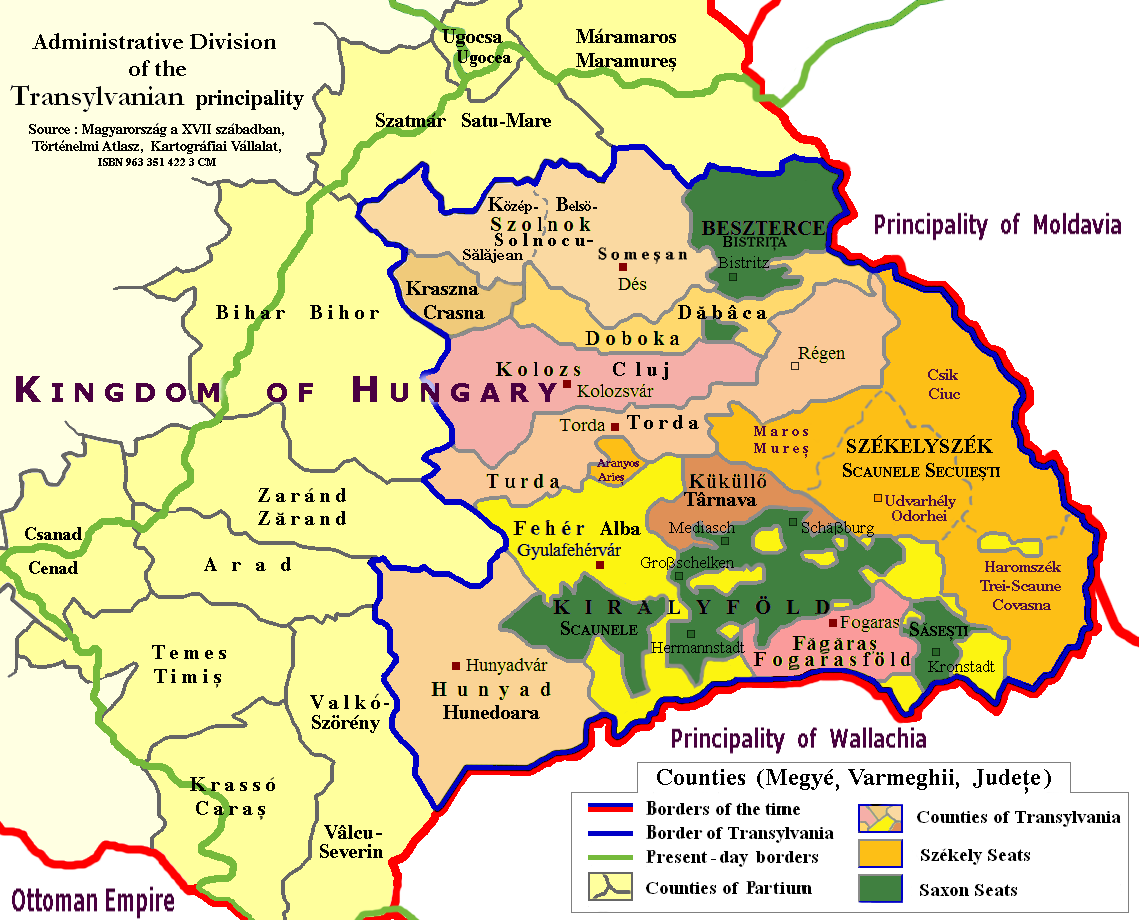
Counties of Transylvania in the 17th century; Küküllő County is in the center, colored in darker brown

Küküllő County (Hungarian: Küküllő vármegye; Romanian: Comitatul Târnava; German: Komitat Kokelburg) was a county of the Kingdom of Hungary. Located in the Transylvania region between the rivers Maros (Mureș) and Nagy-Küküllő (Târnava Mare), it existed from the 11th century until the 1876 Hungarian county reform, when its territory was divided over the new counties Kis-Küküllő and Udvarhely. Its capital was Küküllővár (German: Kokelburg, Romanian: Cetatea de Baltă).
