= Gănești =

Gănești Vámosgálfalva
- Commune
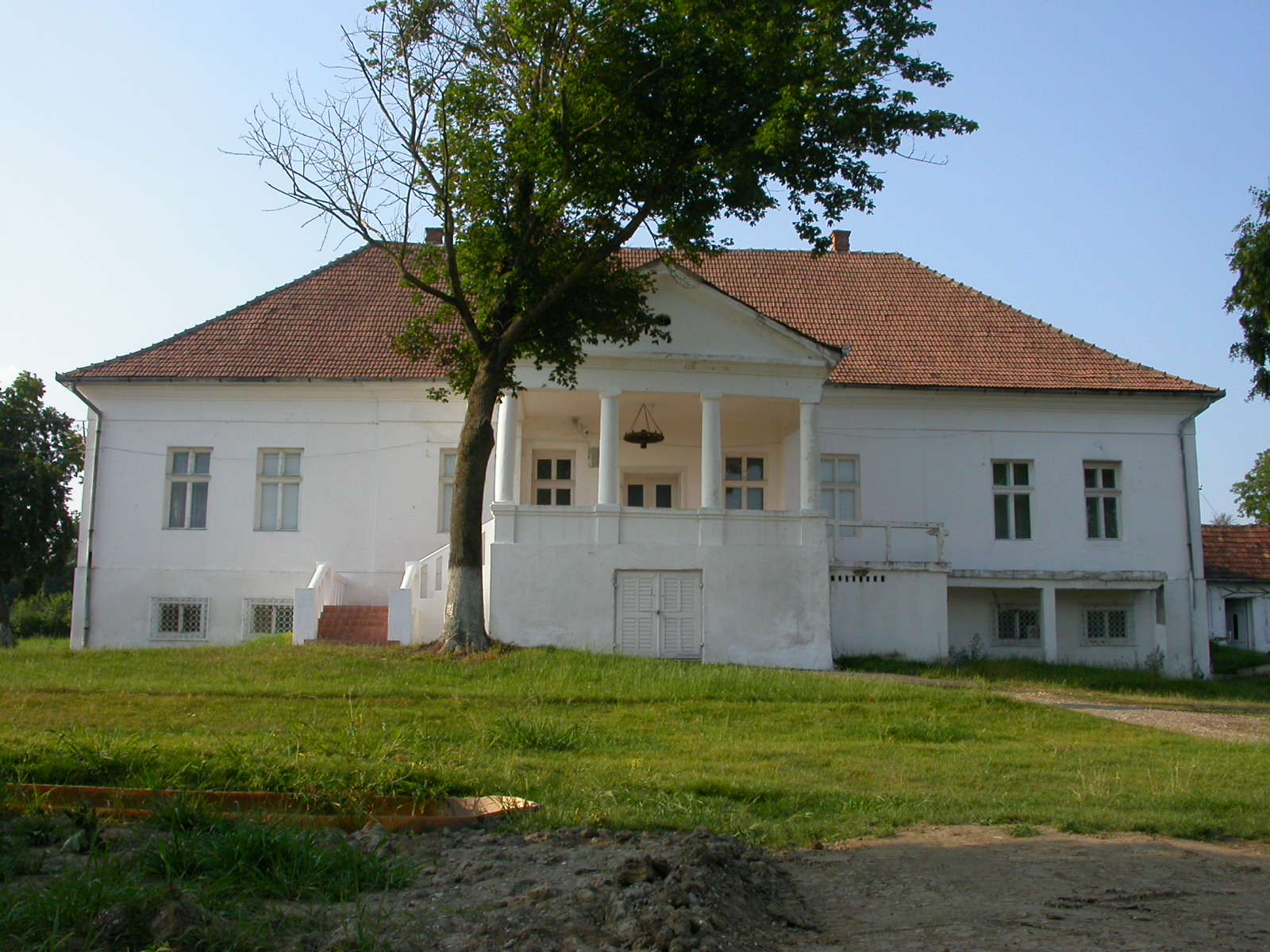
- Dániel Castle in Gănești village

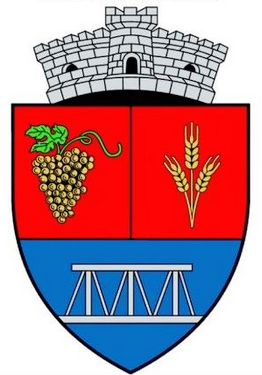
- Coat of arms

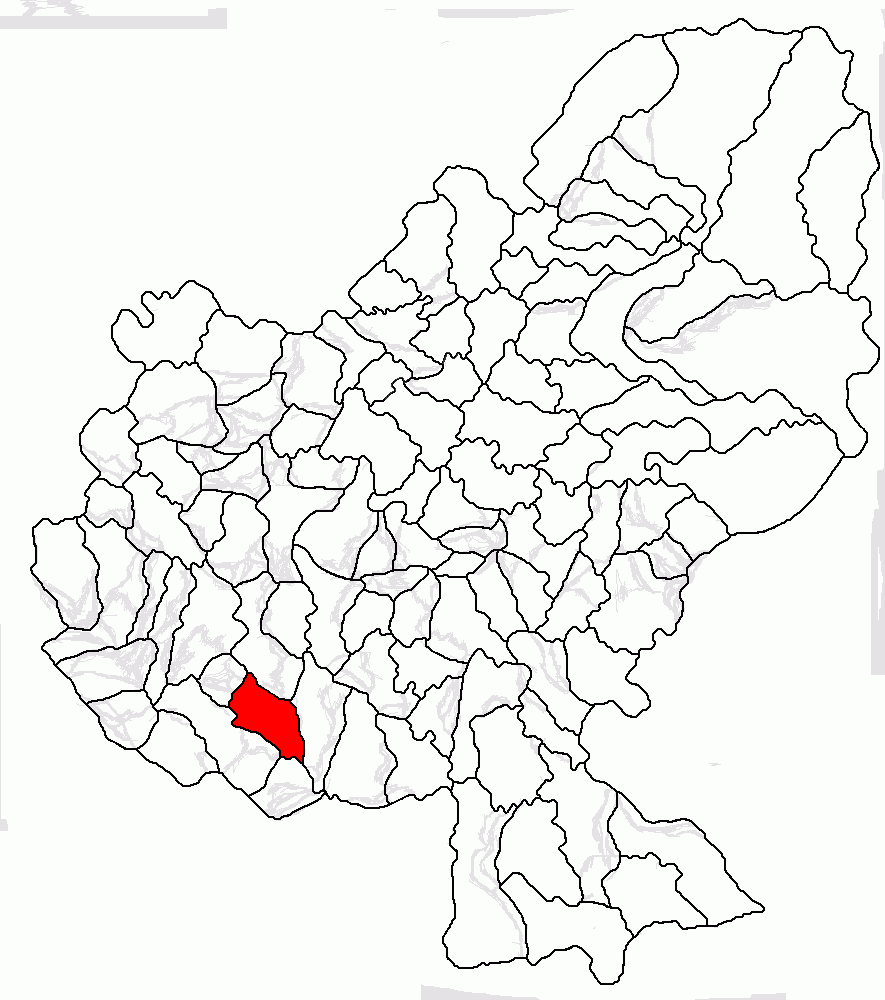
- Location in Mureș County

- Location in Romania
- Coordinates: 46.33°N 24.35°E
- Country: Romania
- County: Mureș

Government
  - Mayor (2020–2024): Elemér Balog (UDMR)
- Area: 47.11 km^{2} (18.19 sq mi)
- Highest elevation: 504 m (1,654 ft)
- Lowest elevation: 347 m (1,138 ft)
- Population (2021-12-01): 3,131
  - Density: 66.46/km^{2} (172.1/sq mi)
- Time zone: UTC+02:00 (EET)
  - Summer (DST): UTC+03:00 (EEST)
- Postal code: 547255
- Area code: +(40) 265
- Vehicle reg.: MS
- Website: www.primariaganesti.ro

Gănești (Hungarian: Vámosgálfalva, Hungarian pronunciation: [ˈvaːmoʃɡaːlfɒlvɒ]) is a commune in Mureș County, Transylvania, Romania. It is composed of four villages: Gănești, Păucișoara (Küküllőpócsfalva), Seuca (Szőkefalva), and Sub Pădure (Erdőalja). It also included Cuștelnic village until 2002, when it was transferred to Târnăveni city.

The commune is located in the southern part of the county, on the Transylvanian Plateau, at a distance of 5 km (3.1 mi) from Târnăveni. It lies on both banks of the river Târnava Mică and it is traversed by the river Băgaciu (or Bedea).

Gănești borders the communes Cucerdea and Ogra to the north, Mica to the east, Băgaciu to the south, and the city of Târnăveni to the west.

== Demographics ==
Historical population
Year	Pop.	±%
1850	2,527	—
1930	3,876	+53.4%
1966	4,575	+18.0%
2002	3,836	−16.2%
2011	3,573	−6.9%
2021	3,131	−12.4%
Source: Census data

As of January 1, 2012, the commune had a population of 3,511, of which 2,300 were ethnic Hungarians (65.5%), 862 ethnic Romanians (24.5%), and 346 ethnic Roma (9.9%). At the 2021 census, Gănești had a population of 3131; of those, 59.31% were Hungarians, 23.79% Romanians, and 11.72% Roma.

== See also ==
- List of Hungarian exonyms (Mureș County)
- Saint Michael the Archangel Church (Sub Pădure)
- Saint John the Baptist Church (Seuca)
- Rhédei-Rothenthal Castle
