= Ocland =

Ocland Oklánd
- Commune
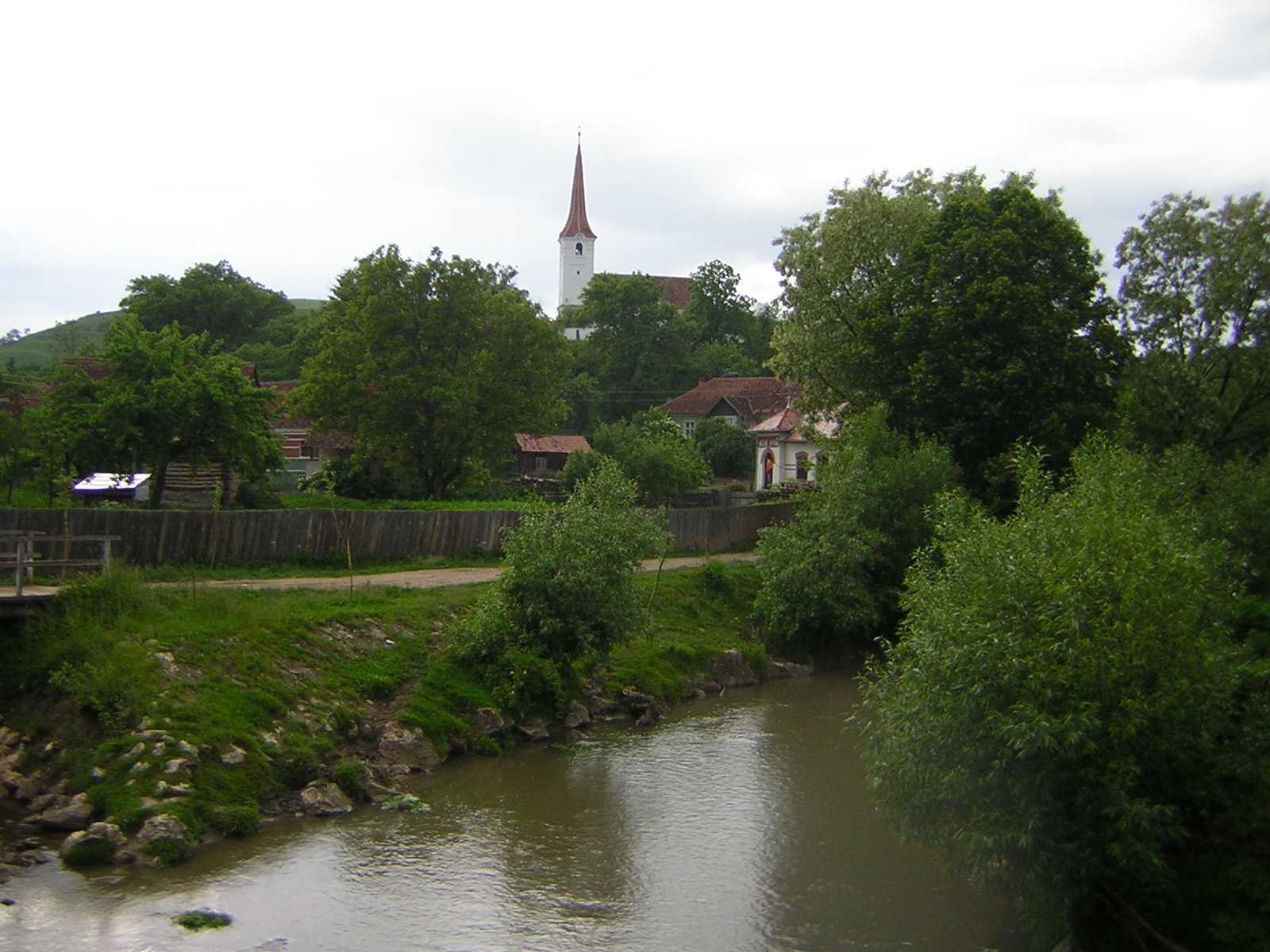
- Unitarian church in Satu Nou

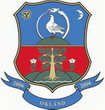
- Coat of arms

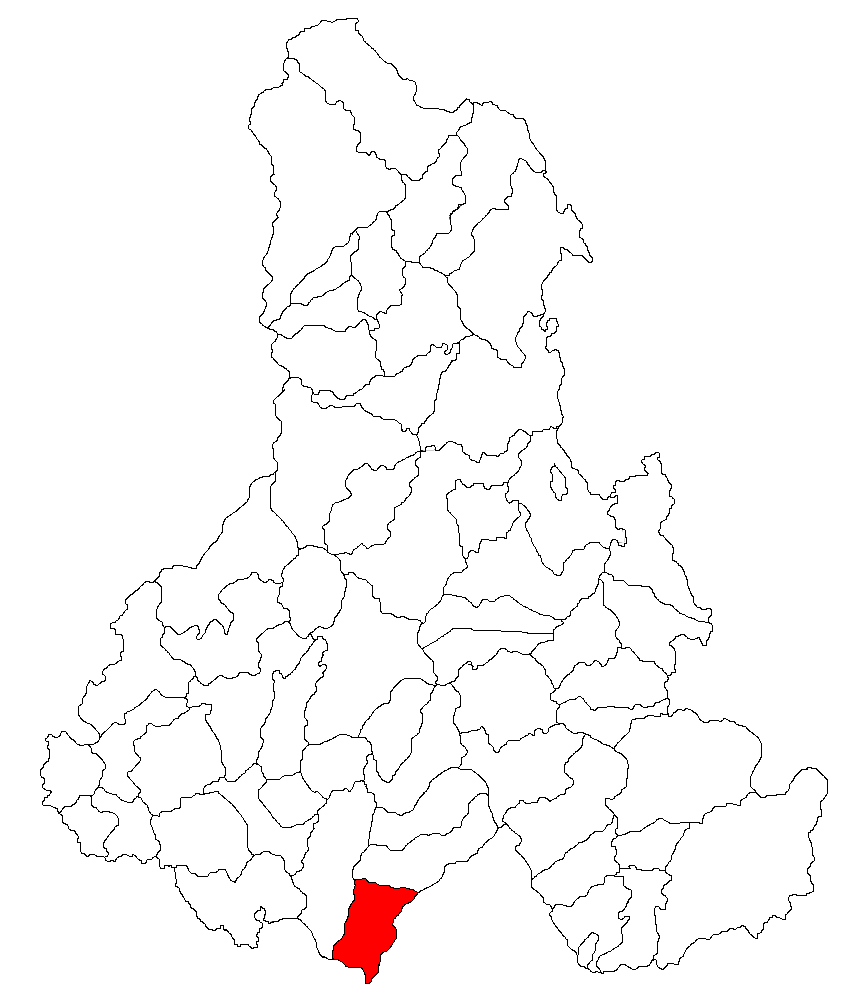
- Location in Harghita County

- Location in Romania
- Coordinates: 46°10′N 25°25′E
- Country: Romania
- County: Harghita

Government
  - Mayor (2020–2024): Lehel Godra (UDMR)
- Area: 62.96 km^{2} (24.31 sq mi)
- Elevation: 506 m (1,660 ft)
- Population (2021-12-01): 1,270
  - Density: 20.2/km^{2} (52.2/sq mi)
- Time zone: UTC+02:00 (EET)
  - Summer (DST): UTC+03:00 (EEST)
- Postal code: 537225
- Area code: +(40) 266
- Vehicle reg.: HR
- Website: www.okland.ro

Ocland (Hungarian: Oklánd, Hungarian pronunciation: [ˈoklaːnd]) is a commune in Harghita County, Romania. It lies in the Székely Land, an ethno-cultural region in eastern Transylvania. The commune is composed of three villages: Crăciunel (Karácsonyfalva), Ocland, and Satu Nou (Homoródújfalu).

== History ==
Ocland was first recorded in 1546 as Akland, and in 1550 as Okland. The name Karácsonyfalva was first recorded in 1333 in a tithe register when a priest of Karachni was mentioned. In 1453, reference was made of Peter, son of Michael, of Karachonfalwa. Its Romanian name derives from the Hungarian and historically it was Crăciunfăleni. The name of Homoródújfalu was first recorded in 1481 in the form of Wijfalw, in 1861 it was called officially Homoród-Ujfalu. The Romanian name was originally Homorod-Uifalău which was changed to the current official form after World War I.

The villages were part of the Székely Land region of the historical Transylvania province. They belonged to Udvarhelyszék district until the administrative reform of Transylvania in 1876, when they fell within the Homoród district of Udvarhely County in the Kingdom of Hungary. Oklánd was the district seat until after World War II. After the Treaty of Trianon of 1920, they became part of Romania and fell within Odorhei County during the interwar period. In 1940, the second Vienna Award granted the Northern Transylvania to Hungary and the villages were held by Hungary until 1944. After Soviet occupation, the Romanian administration returned and the commune officially became part of Romania again in 1947. Between 1952 and 1960, the commune fell within the Magyar Autonomous Region, and between 1960 and 1968 the Mureș-Magyar Autonomous Region. In 1968, the autonomous region was abolished, and since then, the commune has been part of Harghita County.

== Demographics ==
The commune has a Hungarian (Székely) majority. According to the 2011 census, it had a population of 1,257, of which 98.41% or 1,237 were Hungarians. At the 2021 census, Ocland had 1,270 inhabitants; of those, 92.83% were Hungarians.

== Landmarks ==
=== Ocland ===
- The ramparts of the watchtower of a Roman castrum, called by locals as Hagymás castle, can still be seen in the saddle of the Mogyorós and Szilas creeks.
- The Kustaly Castle is located east of the village. It was built in the 11th to 12th centuries as part of the Hungarian border defence system.
- The Unitarian church of the village is from the Romanesque era and was altered around the turn of the 15th to 16th century in late Gothic style. It received its current form by the constructions works made in 1938.

=== Crăciunel ===
- The Unitarian Church. Medieval fresco scenes cover 100 square meters and show the legend of Ladislaus I of Hungary, the birth of Jesus, the homage of the Three Kings, Empress Saint Helen. It has a unique coffered ceiling, painted furniture, sanctuary dating from the Árpád Dynasty of medieval Hungary. The church was already mentioned in 1333. The construction of the gate on the southern side and the enlargement of the windows are thought to have been made in the 14th century. The western gate decorated with a relief representing the Agnus Dei was built in 1496 at the same time with the robust church tower. A Székely runic inscription was found in the wall of the tower. The meaning of the old Hungarian script is still not definitely solved.
- The monument to Queen Elisabeth of Hungary was erected outside the wall of the Unitarian church in 1904.
- The Roman Catholic church was built in the 18th century, its altar, however, is from the 17th century and it is thought to preserve components from the pre-Reformation era.

== Twinnings ==
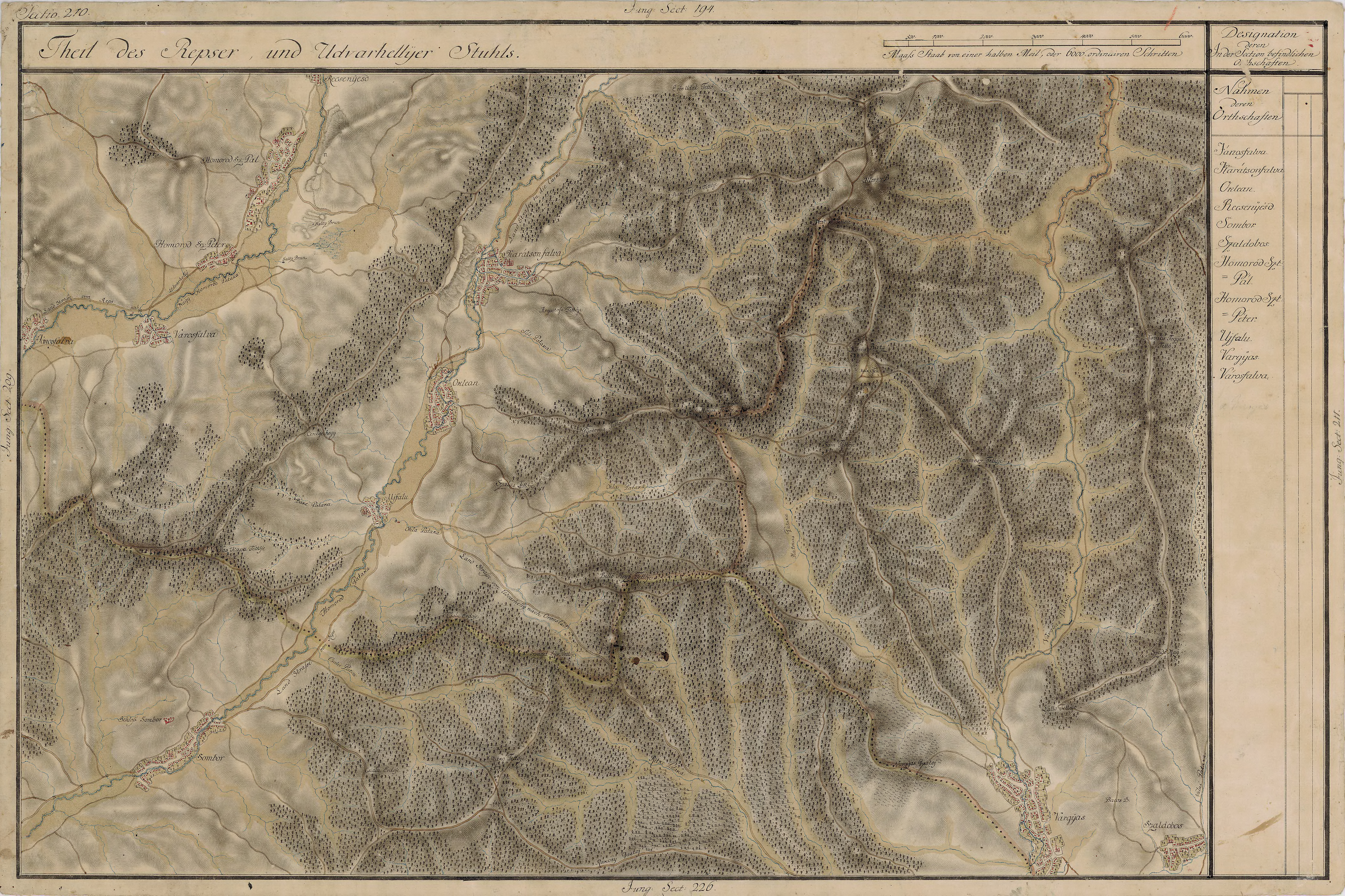
As Oklean, Karátsonfalva, and Ujfalu on Josephinische Landaufnahme, 1769–1773

The commune is twinned with

- Csanádalberti, Hungary
- Cserépfalu, Hungary
- Karácsond, Hungary
