= Castra of Târnăveni =

- Location within Romania
- 46.3296°N 24.2851°E
- Location: Târnăveni, Mureș, Romania

History
- Founded: 2nd century AD
- Abandoned: 3rd century AD

Site notes
- Elevation: 282 m (925 ft)
- Condition: Severely affected

Castra of Târnăveni was a fort in the Roman province of Dacia.

== See also ==
- List of castra
- Romania
