= Târnava-Mică County =

Județul Târnava-Mică
- County (Județ)
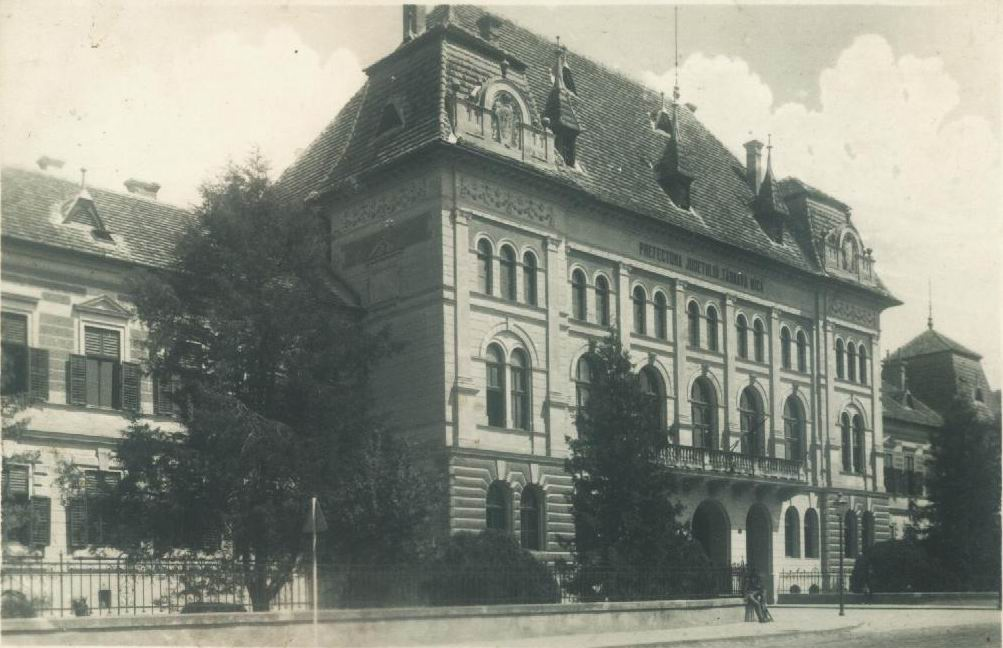
- Târnava-Mică County prefecture building in Diciosânmartin during the interwar period until 1926, when the capital of the county was moved to Blaj.

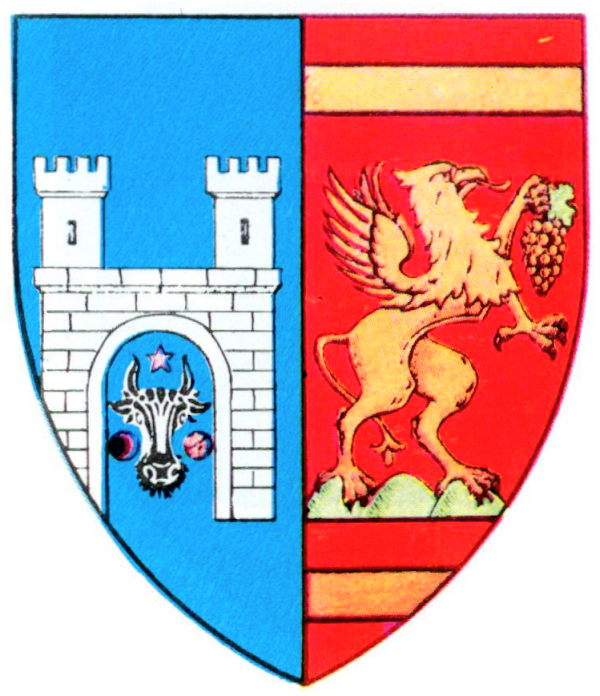
- Coat of arms

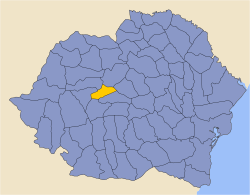
- Country: Romania
- Historic region: Transylvania
- Capital city (Reședință de județ): Diciosânmartin and Blaj
- Established: 1925
- Ceased to exist: Administrative reform of 1950

Area
  - Total: 2,081 km^{2} (803 sq mi)

Population (1930)
  - Total: 149,482
  - Density: 71.83/km^{2} (186.0/sq mi)
- Time zone: UTC+2 (EET)
  - Summer (DST): UTC+3 (EEST)

Târnava-Mică County was a county (Romanian: județ) in the Kingdom of Romania, the successor to Kis-Küküllő County of the Kingdom of Hungary. Its capital was Diciosânmartin (now Târnăveni, in Mureș County) until 1926, and afterwards at Blaj.

== Geography ==
Târnava-Mică County covered 2,081 km^{2} and was located in central part of Greater Romania, in the centre of Transylvania. Currently, the territory that comprised the greater part of Târnava-Mică County is now part of Sibiu County, Mureș County, and Alba County. Its borders were as follows: Turda County to the northwest, Mureș County to the northeast, Alba County to the west, Sibiu County and Târnava-Mare County to the south, and Odorhei County to the east.

== History ==
Prior to World War I, the territory of the county belonged to Austria-Hungary and was identical with the Kis-Küküllő County of the Kingdom of Hungary. The territory of Târnava-Mică County was transferred to Romania from Hungary as successor state to Austria-Hungary in 1920 under the Treaty of Trianon. After the administrative unification law in 1925, the name of the county remained as it was, but the territory was reorganized. In 1940, a portion of the county was transferred back to Hungary with the rest of Northern Transylvania under the Second Vienna Award. Beginning in 1944, Romanian forces with Soviet assistance recaptured the ceded territory and annexed it to the rump county. Romanian jurisdiction over the entire county per the Treaty of Trianon was reaffirmed in the Paris Peace Treaties, 1947. The county was finally disestablished by the communist government of Romania in 1950.

== Administrative organization ==
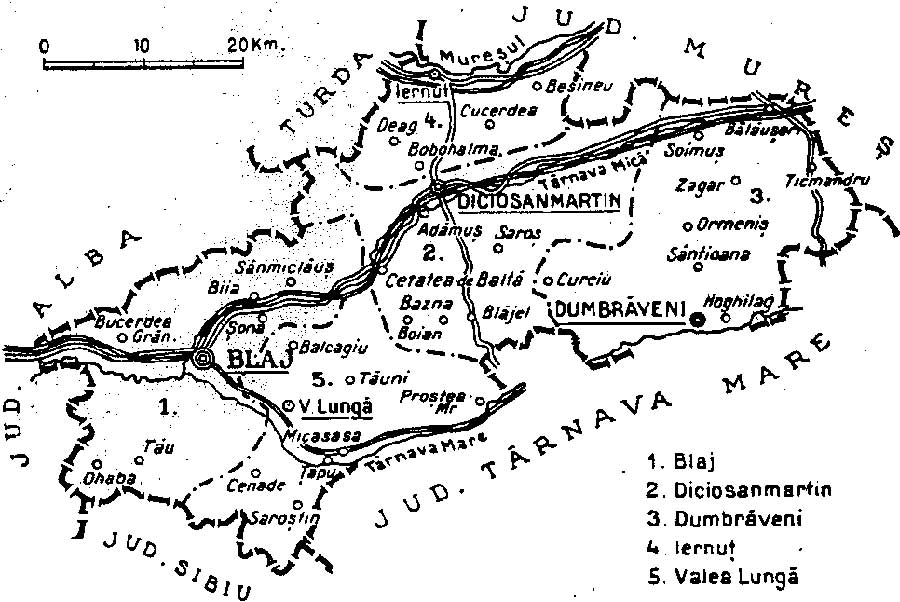
Map of Târnava-Mică County as constituted in 1938.

Administratively, Târnava-Mică County was made up of three cities – Diciosânmartin, Ibașfalău (Elisabetopol, Elisabethstadt, Erzsébetváros), and Blaj – and initially four districts (plăși):

1. Plasa Blaj, headquartered at Blaj
2. Plasa Diciosânmartin, headquartered at Diciosânmartin
3. Plasa Dumbrăveni, headquartered at Dumbrăveni
4. Plasa Iernut, headquartered at Iernut

Later, a fifth district was established:

5. Plasa Valea Lungă, headquartered at Valea Lungă

== Population ==
Whilst still part of Austria-Hungary, in 1870, the population of Târnava-Mică County was 100,161. In 1891, the population of the county was 101,045, of which 49.1% were ethnic Romanians, 27.4% Hungarians, and 18.1% Germans, as well as other minorities.

According to the Romanian census of 1930 the population of Târnava-Mică County was 149,482, of which 53.9% were ethnic Romanians, 23.6% Hungarians, 16.1% Germans, 5.1% Romanies, and 1.1% Jews, as well as other minorities. Classified by religion: 40.7% were Greek-Catholic, 16.6% Orthodox Christian, 16.6% were Reformed (Calivinist), 16.2% Lutheran, 4.6% were Roman Catholic, 3.3% Unitarian, and 1.1% Jewish, as well as other minorities.

== Urban population ==
In 1930 the urban population of Târnava-Mică County included 45.6% Romanians, 37.3% Hungarians, 5.6% Jews, and 5.3% Germans by ethnicity, as well as other minorities. The religious mix of the urban population was 38.0% Greek-Catholic, 18.8% Reformed, 12.9% Roman Catholic, 11.0% Eastern Orthodox, 6.2% Unitarian, 6.0% Jewish, and 4.7% Lutheran, and 1.2% Adventist, as well as other minorities.
