= Târnăveni Unitarian Church =

Unitarian church in Târnăveni, Romania

Coordinates: 46°19′50″N 24°16′48″E

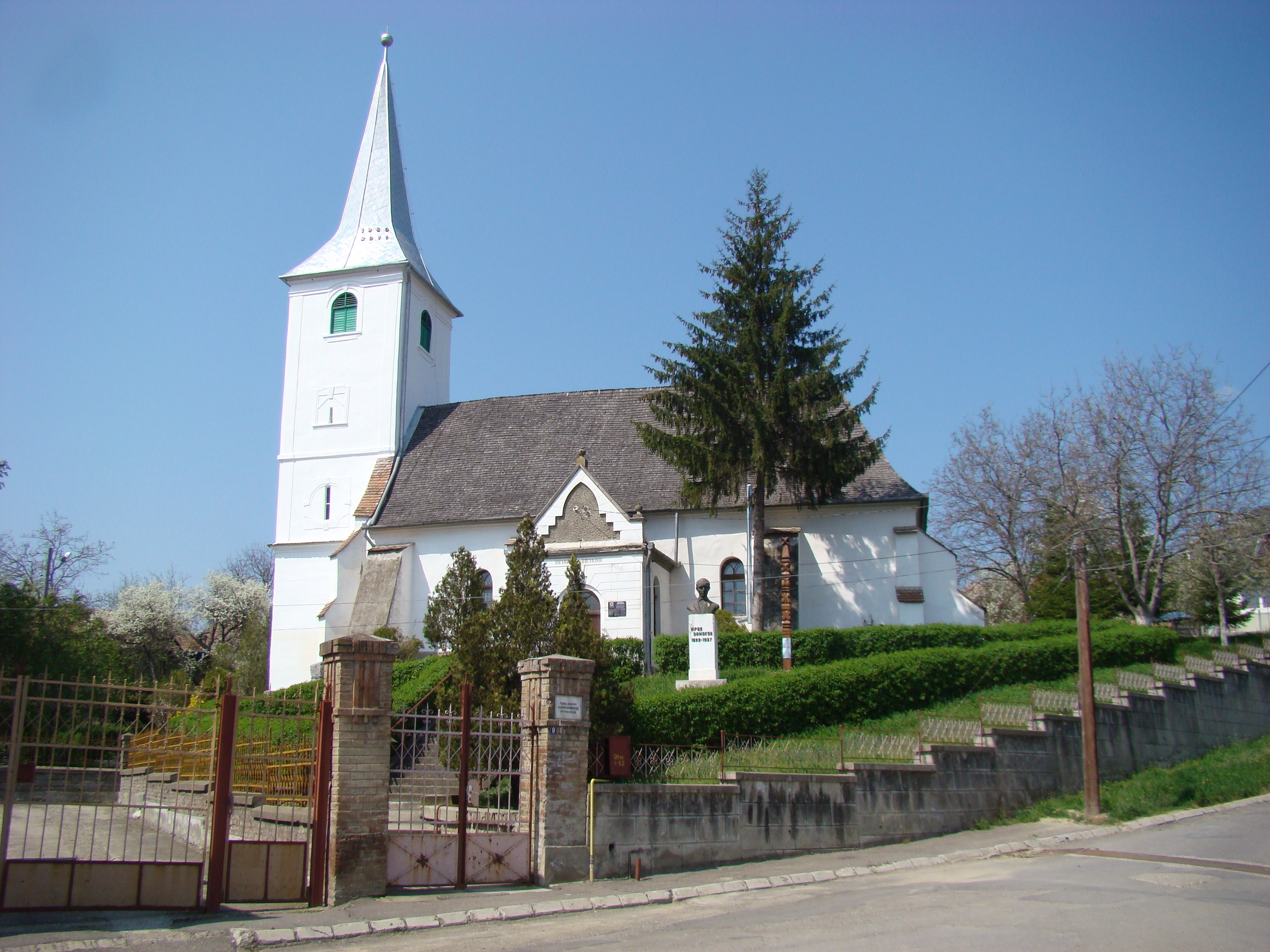
Târnăveni Unitarian Church

The Târnăveni Unitarian Church is a Unitarian church located at 9 Piața Primăriei, Târnăveni, Romania.

Originally built in a Gothic style, the church's most distinct feature is its 99-panel painted coffered ceiling made in 1769 by János Váradi. Aside from typical Protestant symbolism, includes unique figurative designs such as a hand holding a sword, a chessboard, laughing grapevines and a sickle swinging through a wheat field. The pulpit roof is a high-quality work, carved in 1764 in a Kolozsvár carpentry workshop. The parapet of the western and eastern galleries is painted yellow.

The church is listed as a historic monument by Romania's Ministry of Culture and Religious Affairs. According to this source, the church began to be built in the late 13th century, with work lasting through the 16th, and further construction being carried out in the 18th and 19th.
