= Olga Bede =

Romanian Magyar writer

Olga Bede (November 24, 1908 in Dicsőszentmárton – 1985 in Târgu Mureş) was a Hungarian-speaking Romanian Magyar writer.

She finished her studies in Dicsőszentmárton in 1925 and worked as a bureaucrat in several towns of Transylvania.

She debuted in the late 1950s with poems, stories and plays for children and youth broadcast on the radio. She launched a series of puppet and theater shows for children at the People's Creation House in Târgu Mureș. Her best-known work was the puppet play Forest Memories, performed in 1964.

== Works ==
- Harkály doktor, 1957
- Az Óperencián innen és túl, 1957
- Aranymadár, 1958
- Varázstükör, 1958
- Két kis csibész kalandjai, 1960
- Pionírok az űrhajón, 1961
- Kék virág, 1961
- Mai játék, 1963
- Pionír-köszöntő, 1964
- Mesél az erdő, 1964
- Be szép a nyár!, 1968
- Bújj, bújj zöld ág, 1968

== Sources ==
- (in Hungarian) http://mek.oszk.hu/03600/0362
