= Băgaciu (river) =

- Location within Romania

Location
- Country: Romania
- Counties: Mureș County

Physical characteristics
- Mouth: Târnava Mică
  - location: Gănești
  - coordinates: 46.3365°N 24.3590°E
- Length: 10 km (6.2 mi)
- Basin size: 31 km^{2} (12 sq mi)

Basin features
- Progression: Târnava Mică→ Târnava→ Mureș→ Tisza→ Danube→ Black Sea

The Băgaciu is a left tributary of the river Târnava Mică in Romania. It discharges into the Târnava Mică in Gănești. Its length is 10 km (6.2 mi) and its basin size is 31 km^{2} (12 sq mi).
