= List of prefects of Bucharest =

This is a list of prefects of Bucharest.

Name	From	Until
Doru Viorel Pană	20 February 1992	2 August 1993
Gheorghe Vâlceanu	2 August 1993	20 August 1996
Gheorghe Simion	20 August 1996	28 December 1996
Ion Iordan	28 December 1996	26 January 2001
Mihai Ion Florin Luican	26 January 2001	17 January 2002
Gabriel Oprea	17 January 2002	20 June 2003
Petre Botezatu Enescu	7 October 2003	13 November 2003
Ovidiu Grecea	13 November 2003	8 May 2004
Dan Alexandru Darabont	8 June 2004	1 July 2005
Silvian Ionescu	1 July 2005	13 January 2005
Mioara Mantale	23 January 2005	9 March 2007
Cătălin Deaconescu	9 March 2007	19 June 2008
Ion Țincu	19 June 2008	3 December 2009
Mihai Cristian Atănăsoaei	3 December 2009	4 November 2011
Cristina Coruț	18 April 2012	18 May 2012
Georgeta Gavrilă	18 May 2012	2 April 2014
Paul Nicolae Petrovan	2 April 2014	2 April 2017
Corneliu Cîrstea	2 April 2017	4 May 2017
Adrian Petcu	5 May 2017	8 July 2018
Speranța Cliseru	9 July 2018	20 December 2018
Sever-Romulus Stana	9 January 2019	30 July 2019
Marius-Cristian Ghincea	31 July 2019	11 December 2019
Nicoleta-Matilda Goleac	11 December 2019	21 May 2020
Gheorghe Cojanu	22 May 2020	19 October 2020
Traian Berbeceanu	22 October 2020	4 March 2021
Alin Stoica	10 March 2021	9 September 2021
Florela-Antonela Ghiță	9 September 2021	7 October 2021
Alexandra Georgiana Văcaru	7 October 2021	4 May 2022
Toni Greblă	4 May 2022	29 March 2023
Rareș Hopincă	27 July 2023	11 April 2024
Mugur-Mihai Toader	11 April 2024	

== See also ==
- List of mayors of Bucharest
