= Kis-Küküllő County =

Administrative county (comitatus) of the Kingdom of Hungary

Kis-Küküllő County Comitatus Cuculiensis Minor (Latin) Kis-Küküllő vármegye (Hungarian) Komitat Klein-Kokelburg (German) Comitatul Târnava-Mică (Romanian)
- County of Kingdom of Hungary
- 1876–1920
- Coat of arms

- Capital: Dicsőszentmárton
- Area
  - Coordinates: 46°20′N 24°18′E
  - 1910: 1,724 km^{2} (666 sq mi)
- Population
  - 1910: 116,091
- History
  - Established: 1876
  - Treaty of Trianon: 4 June 1920
- Today part of: Romania
- Târnăveni is the current name of the capital

Kis-Küküllő was an administrative county (comitatus) of the Kingdom of Hungary. Its territory is now in central Romania (central Transylvania). Kis-Küküllő is the Hungarian name for the river Târnava Mică. The capital of the county was Dicsőszentmárton (now Târnăveni).

== Geography ==
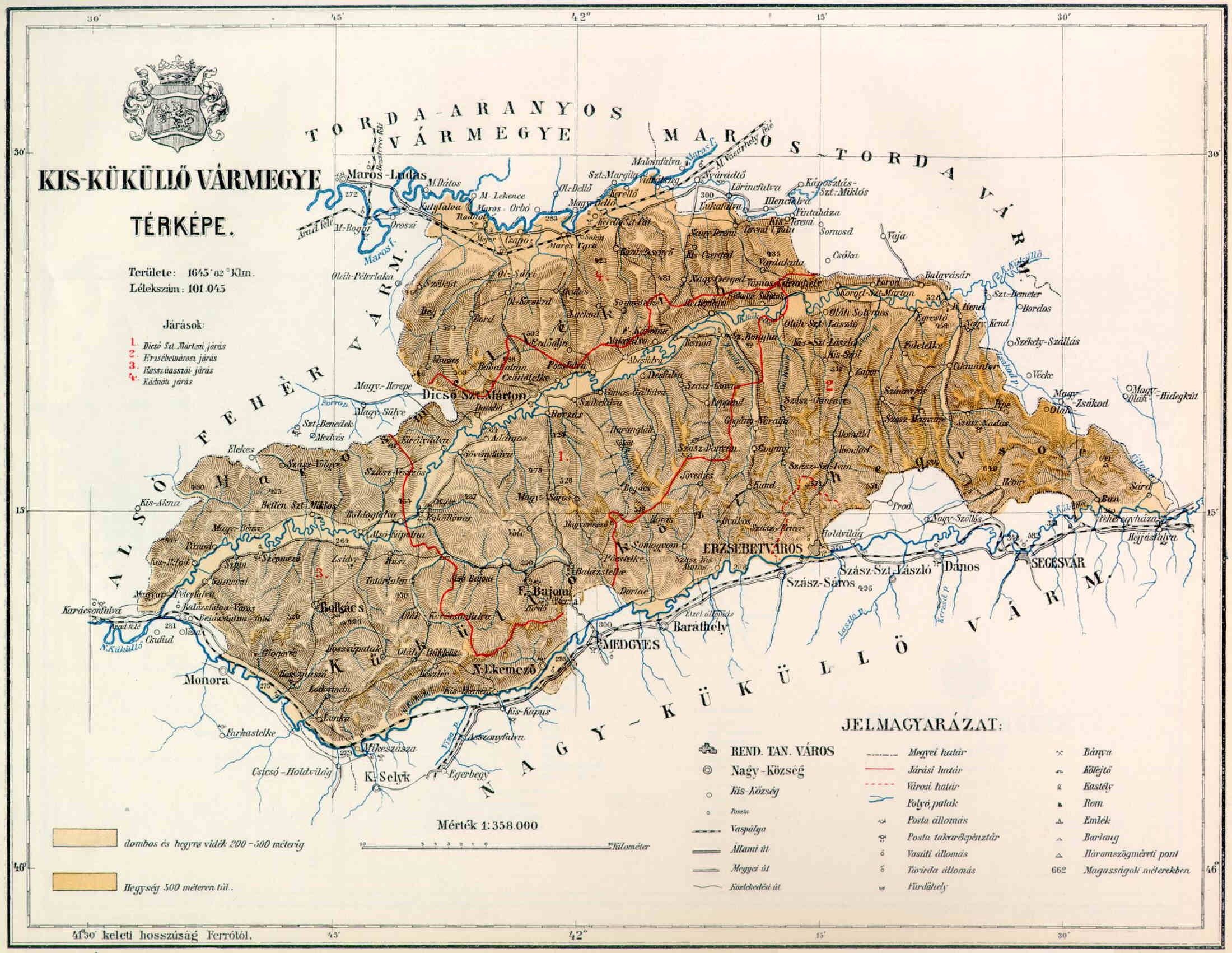
Map of Kis-Küküllő, 1891

Kis-Küküllő county shared borders with the Hungarian counties Alsó-Fehér, Torda-Aranyos, Maros-Torda, Udvarhely, and Nagy-Küküllő. The river Mureș formed part of its northern border, the river Târnava Mare its southern border. The Târnava Mică River flowed through the county. Its area was 1,724 km^{2} (666 sq mi) around 1910.

== History ==
Kis-Küküllő County came into existence in 1876, when the administrative structure of Transylvania was changed and Küküllő County was split. In 1920, by the Treaty of Trianon, the county became part of the Kingdom of Romania. After the Second Vienna Award, a little part of the former county became part of Hungary again and was assigned to the recreated Maros-Torda County. Its territory lies in the present Romanian counties Mureș (around Târnăveni), Alba (the south-west), and Sibiu (the south, around Dumbrăveni).

== Demographics ==
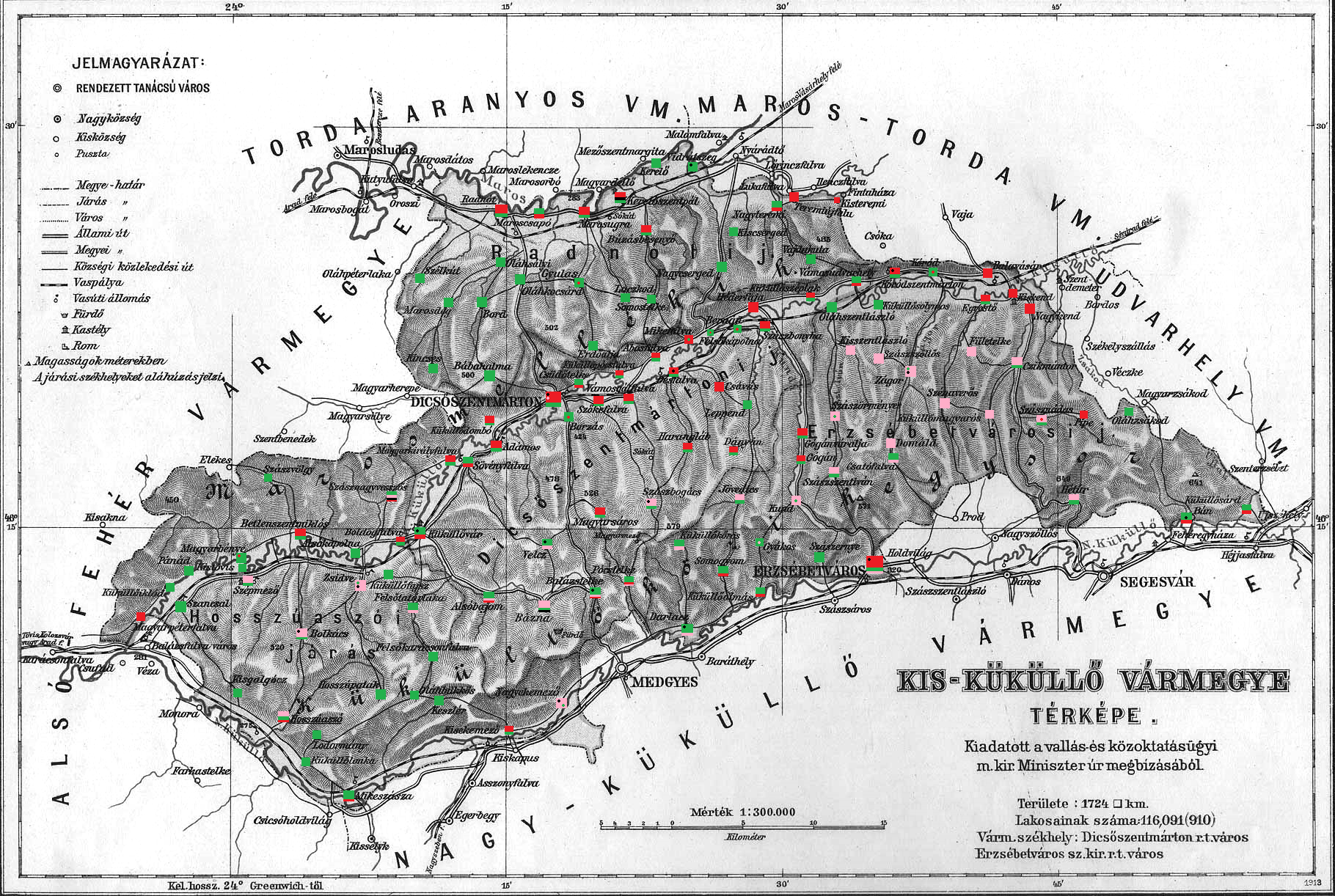
Ethnic map of the county with data of the 1910 census (see the key in the description)

Population by mother tongue (Note: Only linguistic communities > 1% are displayed.)
Census	Total	Romanian	Hungarian	German	Other or unknown
1880	92,214	44,372 (49.92%)	21,604 (24.31%)	16,976 (19.10%)	5,933 (6.67%)
1890	101,045	49,573 (49.06%)	27,652 (27.37%)	18,273 (18.08%)	5,547 (5.49%)
1900	109,197	55,276 (50.62%)	32,491 (29.75%)	19,292 (17.67%)	2,138 (1.96%)
1910	116,091	55,585 (47.88%)	34,902 (30.06%)	20,272 (17.46%)	5,332 (4.59%)

Population by religion (Note: Only religious communities > 1% are displayed.)
Census	Total	Greek Catholic	Calvinist	Lutheran	Eastern Orthodox	Roman Catholic	Unitarian	Jewish	Other or unknown
1880	92,214	33,520 (36.35%)	15,701 (17.03%)	16,794 (18.21%)	16,627 (18.03%)	3,999 (4.34%)	3,968 (4.30%)	1,246 (1.35%)	359 (0.39%)
1890	101,045	35,781 (35.41%)	17,979 (17.79%)	18,174 (17.99%)	18,073 (17.89%)	4,806 (4.76%)	4,483 (4.44%)	1,418 (1.40%)	331 (0.33%)
1900	109,197	39,047 (35.76%)	19,936 (18.26%)	19,089 (17.48%)	18,925 (17.33%)	5,690 (5.21%)	4,874 (4.46%)	1,621 (1.48%)	15 (0.01%)
1910	116,091	41,323 (35.60%)	21,995 (18.95%)	20,159 (17.36%)	19,438 (16.74%)	6,488 (5.59%)	4,916 (4.23%)	1,766 (1.52%)	6 (0.01%)

== Subdivisions ==
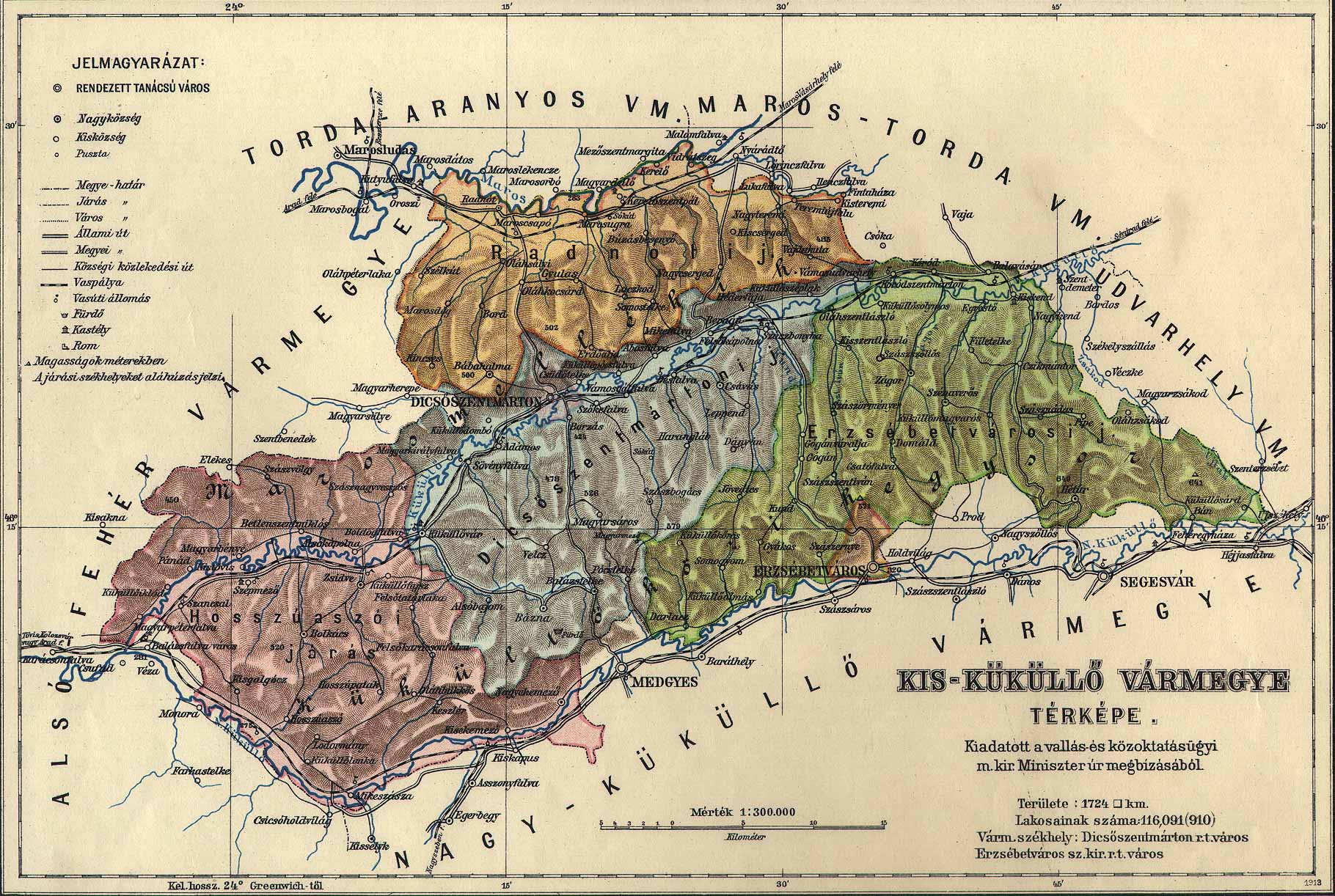

In the early 20th century, the subdivisions of Kis-Küküllő County were:

Districts (járás)
District	Capital
Dicsőszentmárton	Dicsőszentmárton (now Târnăveni)
Erzsébetváros	Erzsébetváros (now Dumbrăveni)
Hosszúaszó	Hosszúaszó (now Valea Lungă)
Radnót	Radnót (now Iernut)
Urban districts (rendezett tanácsú város)
Dicsőszentmárton (now Târnăveni)
Erzsébetváros (now Dumbrăveni)
