= Târnăveni =

- Municipality
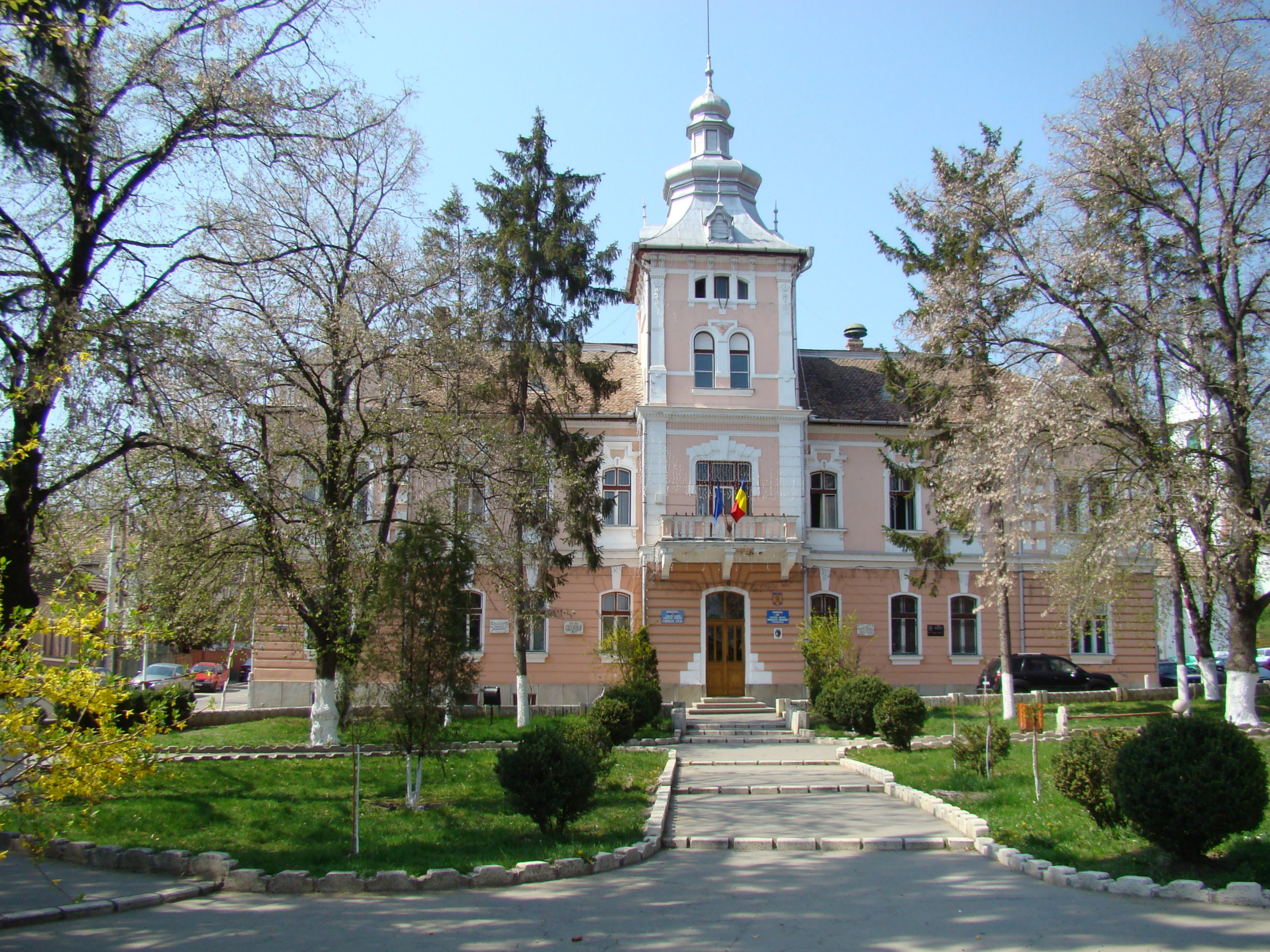
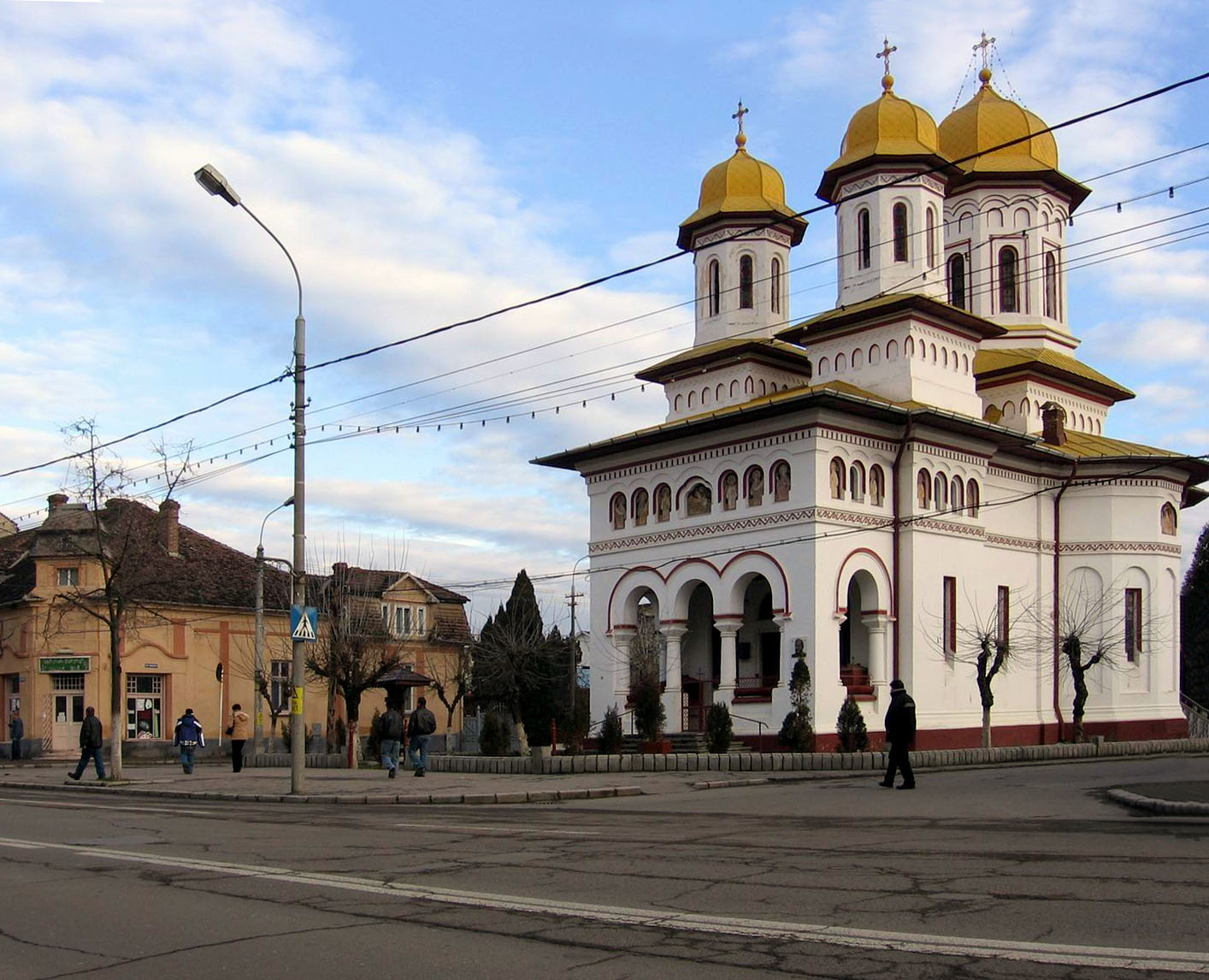
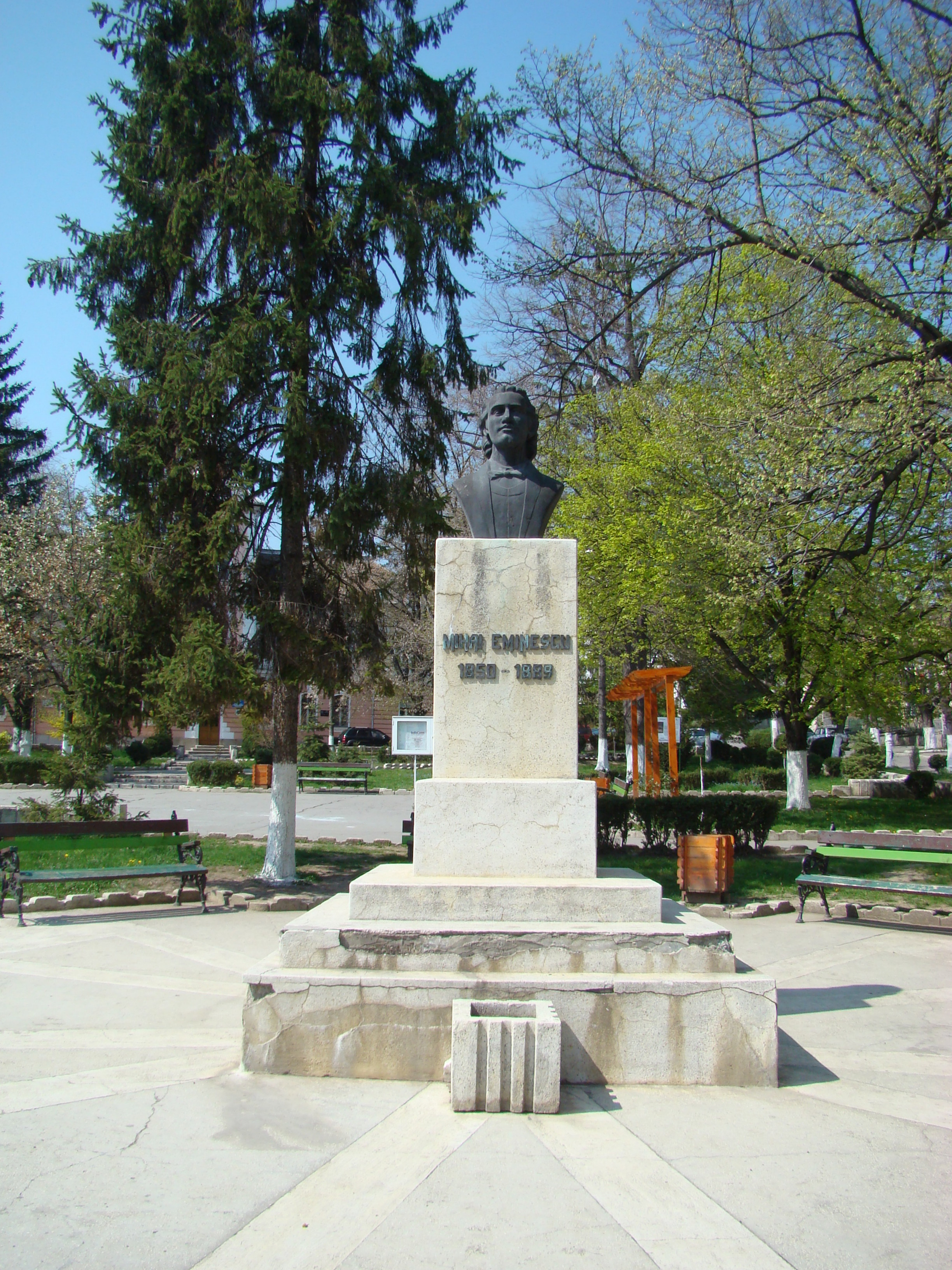
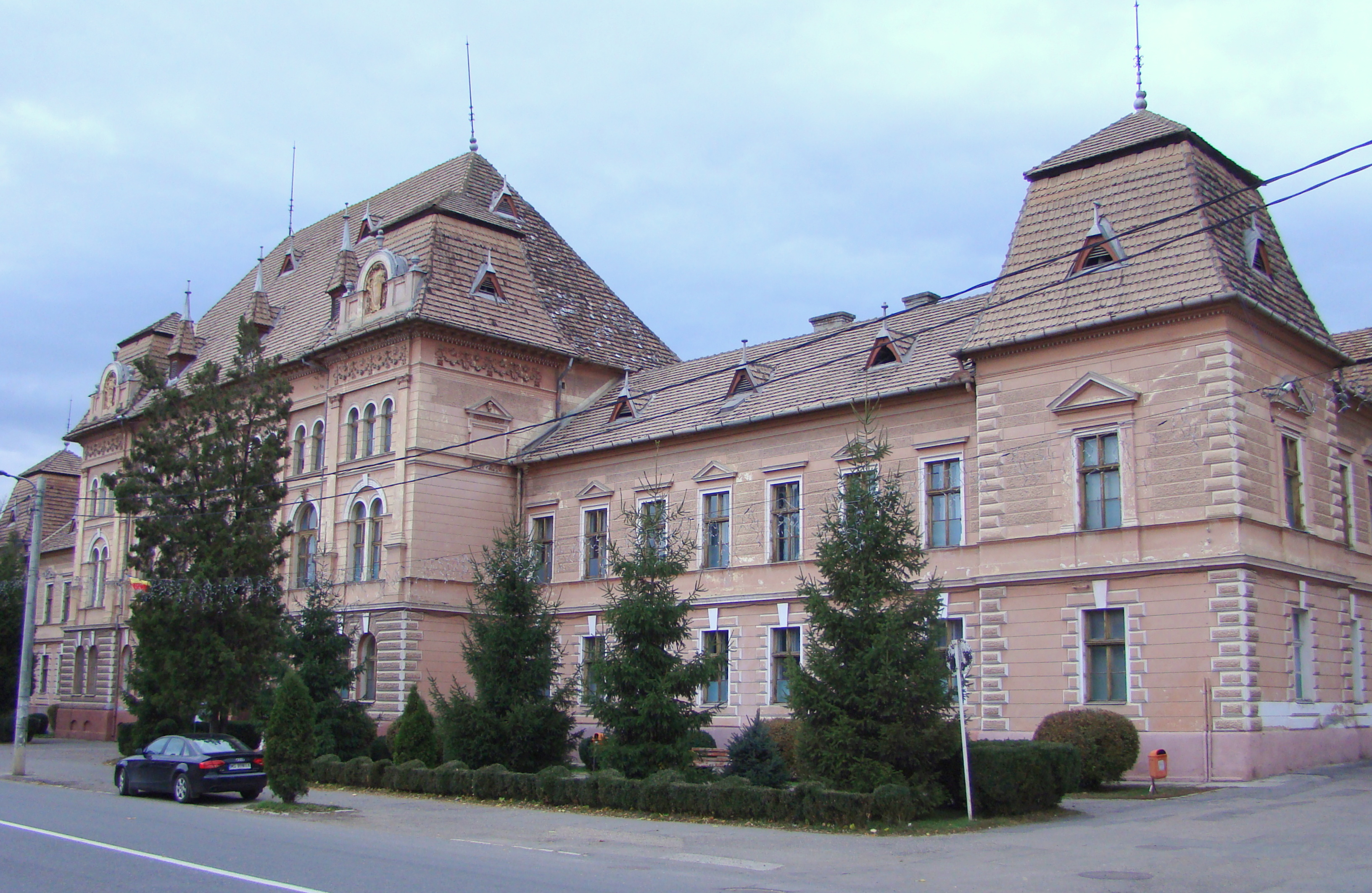
- Tarnăveni City Hall Saint George Church Bust of Mihai Eminescu Prefecture of Târnava-Mică County, today the Technological High School of Târnăveni

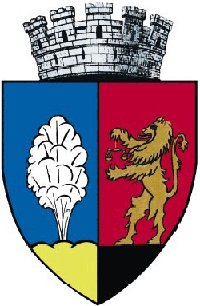
- Coat of arms

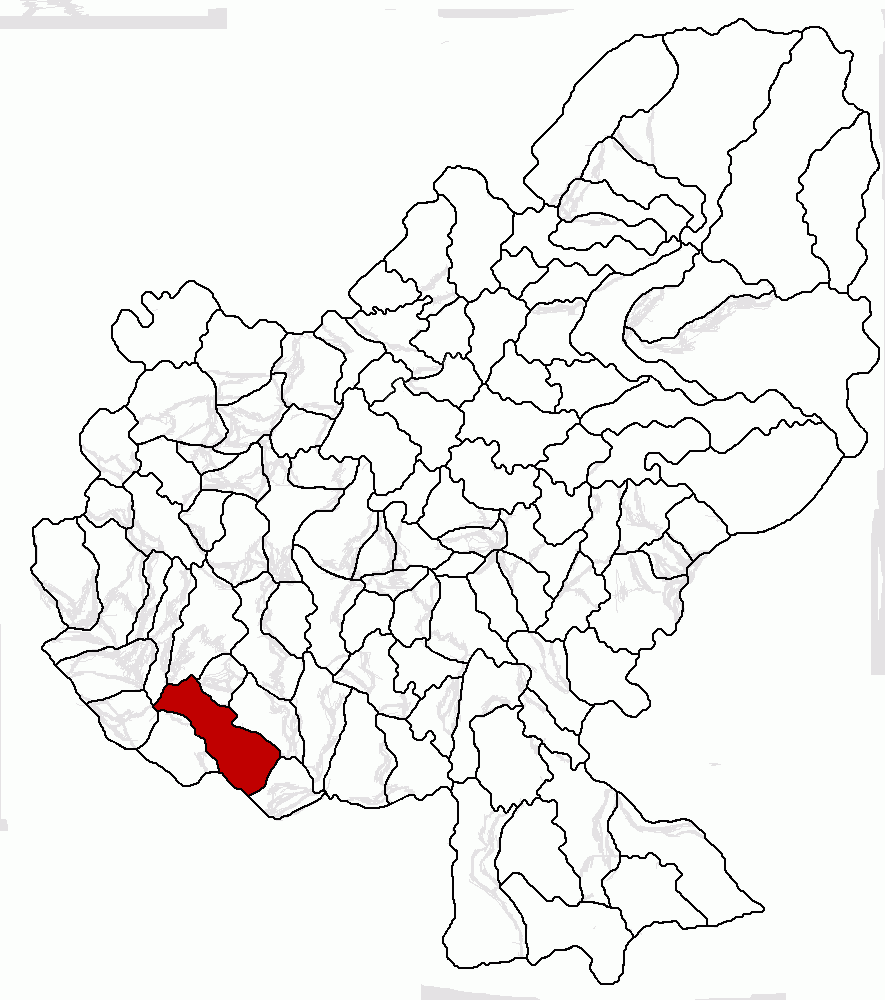
- Location in Mureș County

- Location in Romania
- Coordinates: 46°19′47″N 24°16′12″E
- Country: Romania
- County: Mureș

Government
  - Mayor (2024–2028): Sorin Megheșan (PNL)
- Area: 60.39 km^{2} (23.32 sq mi)
- Elevation: 300 m (980 ft)
- Population (2021-12-01): 20,604
  - Density: 341.2/km^{2} (883.7/sq mi)
- Time zone: UTC+02:00 (EET)
  - Summer (DST): UTC+03:00 (EEST)
- Postal code: 545600
- Area code: (+40) 02 65
- Vehicle reg.: MS
- Website: primariatarnaveni.ro

Târnăveni (Romanian pronunciation: [tɨrnəˈvenʲ], historically Diciosânmartin; Hungarian: Dicsőszentmárton, Hungarian pronunciation: [ˈdit͡ʃøːsɛntmaːrton]; German: Sankt Martin, earlier Marteskirch) is a city in Mureș County, central Romania. It lies on the Târnava Mică River in central Transylvania. The city administers three villages: Bobohalma (Bábahalma), Botorca (Őrhegy), and Cuștelnic (Csüdőtelke); the last was part of Gănești Commune until 2002.

In Romanian, it was previously known as Diciosânmartin, then Târnava-Sânmărtin.

== History ==
=== Prehistoric period ===
Archaeological research has demonstrated that the presence of human communities in this area dates back thousands of years. In 1921, traces of a Neolithic settlement were discovered.

=== Antiquity ===
A collection of 135 Imperial Roman denarii and two silver balls were also found.

=== Middle Ages ===
The place was historically certified in 1279, under the name of terra Dychen Sent Marton, in a document involving land relocations and ownership.

In 1502, the place was mentioned as a borough (Medieval Latin: oppidum), as a part of Cetatea de Baltă fief of the Moldavian Princes Stephen the Great and Petru Rareș. Since vineyards covered the majority of the cultivated land, it came to be known as the "vine country" (Weinland in German).

=== Early modern period ===
For centuries, until the area was ceded to Romania after the Treaty of Trianon following World War I, the city was a local administrative center inside the Kingdom of Hungary and later within Austria-Hungary. During the Hungarian Revolution of 1848, Târnăveni was included in the administrative units of Romanians resisting the Hungarian revolutionary government, and, as part of the 3rd Legion Cetatea de Baltă, provided soldiers for the army of Avram Iancu. Its prefect was Vasile Moldovan, who was ultimately defeated and settled in Boziaș (now a neighborhood of Târnăveni), where he later died.

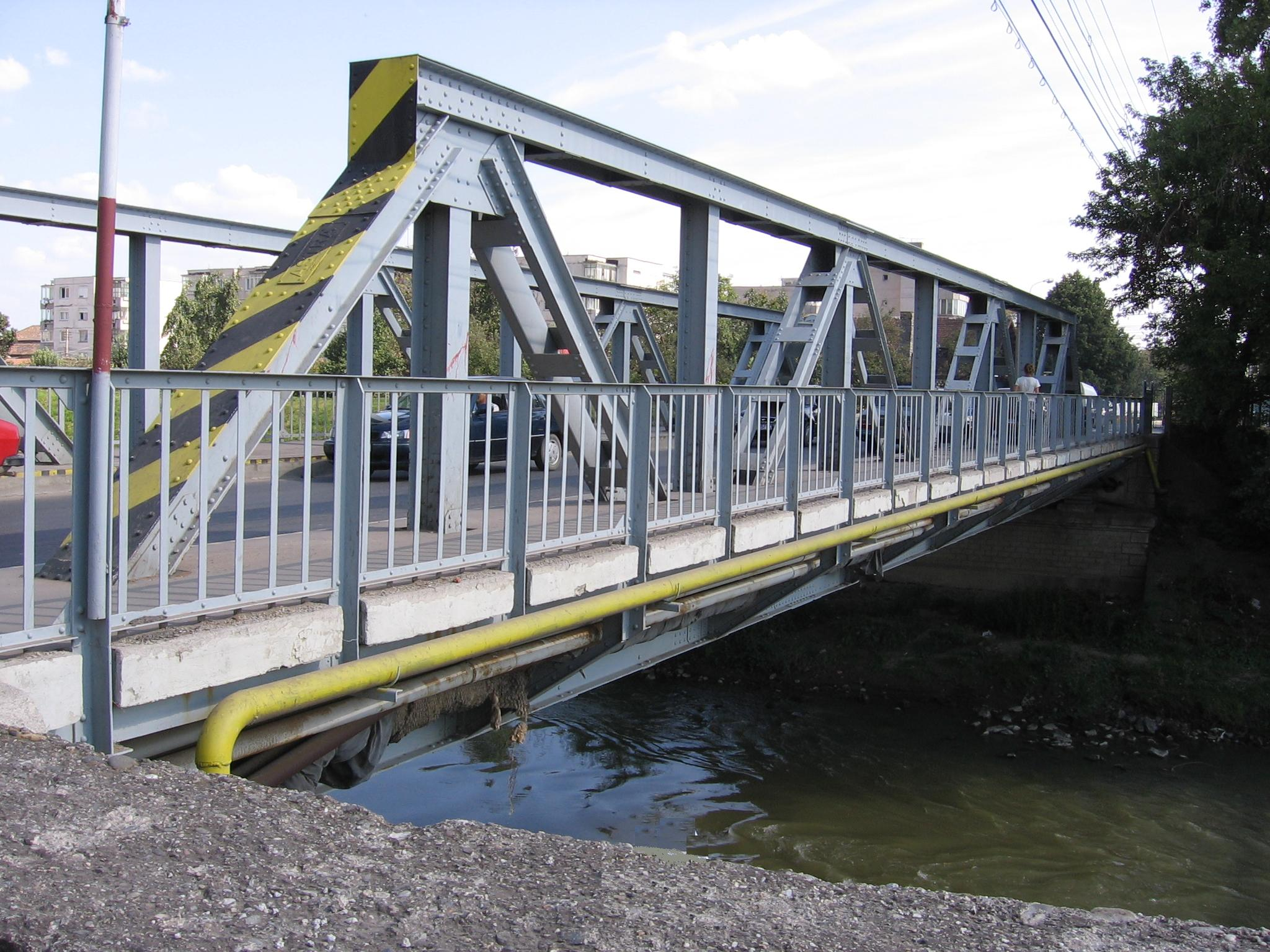
Bridge over the Târnava Mică

After 1866, the city served as the capital of Kis-Küküllő comitatus, alternating this attribute with Küküllővár (today's Cetatea de Baltă) or with Erzsébetváros (today's Dumbrăveni). The late 19th and early 20th centuries, a period when many administrative and social-economic facilities were built in the town, marked an urban evolution. In 1912, the locality was raised to the rank of city.

The discovery of methane deposits radically changed the city history: gas was supplied to private residences after 1915.

=== Interbellum period ===
The inhabitants sent representatives to the Great National Assembly held in Alba Iulia on December 1, 1918. Once Transylvania became a province of the Kingdom of Romania, the town became the administrative seat of Târnava-Mică County. Named Târnava-Sânmărtin during 1920–1926, and later Diciosânmartin, the locality officially became Târnăveni in 1941.

After World War I, a calcium carbide and calcium cyanamide factory was set up, followed by a nitrogen and later by a coke factory. In 1936, an installation of synthetic ammonia production was set in Târnăveni, the first of this type in the world — over the following years, the company involved in the latter process switched to weapons manufacturing. The administrative palace and the hospital were both built during the urban expansion — the latter was where the famous physician Constantin Ion Parhon, whose family was originally from Cetatea de Baltă, used to consult his patients.

=== World War II ===
On 29 April 1941, the city was renamed from Diciosânmărtin to Târnăveni. 230 Romanian soldiers who, after Romania parted with the Axis and joined the Allies in 1944, defended the city against German troops lie buried in the local cemetery.

=== Communist period ===
After the war, the city's industry witnessed continuous development. In 1957, for the first time in the country, polychlorinated vinyl was produced here. A modern glassware factory — Gecsat — is situated in the southeast area, and produces a wide range of export products.

Târnăveni became a municipality on November 5, 1998.

=== Jewish history ===
A Jewish community was established in 1868; among the early settlers were Sephardim from Alba Iulia. By the end of the 19th century, the Jewish population expanded, attracted to the new county capital, and played an important role in its economic development. By 1920, there were 490 Jews, exceeding 10% of the population. A small Hasidic community arose in the interwar period. Zionist activity began in 1918, led by Ernő Marton.

In 1940, the National Legionary State closed down all Jewish shops. In 1941, the town's 796 Jews were sent to Blaj. Ten days later, they returned, when Jewish refugees in the area began to gather in Târnăveni. Many Jews were forced to leave their homes and move to remote areas. The young were sent to forced labor; some were deported to Transnistria Governorate. After 1944, the community was reorganized, but most of its members emigrated to Palestine.

== Geography ==
Târnăveni is crossed by the Blaj-Praid railroad, and also by DN 14A Iernut-Mediaș, DJ 107 Târnăveni-Blaj, DJ Târnăveni-Căpâlna-Ungheni and by DJ 142 Târnăveni-Bălăușeri. Târnăveni is situated at the following distances from:

- Bucharest – 360 km
- Târgu-Mureș – 45 km
- Cluj-Napoca – 102 km
- Sibiu – 78 km
- Mediaș – 25 km
- Blaj – 36 km
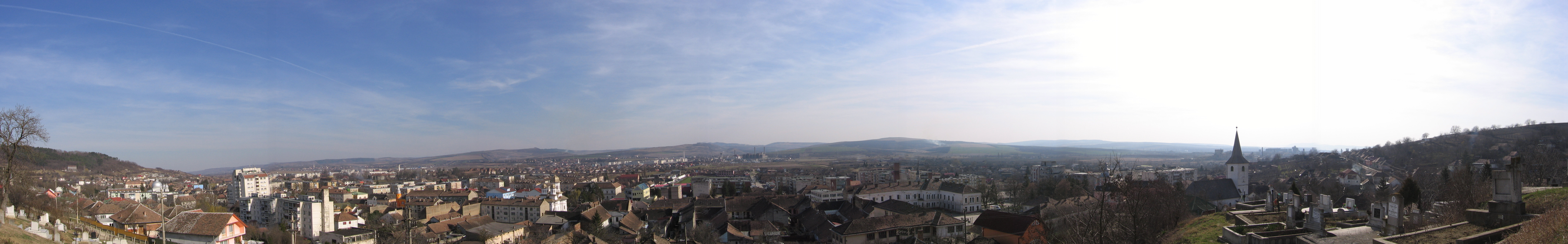
Panorama over Târnăveni

== Demographics ==
Historical population
Year	Pop.	±%
1850	3,263	—
1880	4,238	+29.9%
1900	5,854	+38.1%
1910	7,074	+20.8%
1930	9,628	+36.1%
1956	17,004	+76.6%
1966	20,349	+19.7%
1977	26,073	+28.1%
1992	30,520	+17.1%
2002	26,654	−12.7%
2011	22,075	−17.2%
2021	20,604	−6.7%
Source: Census data

At the 2011 census, Târnăveni had 22,075 inhabitants, making it the 84th largest city in Romania; according to previous records, it had 26,073 inhabitants in 1977, 30,520 in 1992, and 26,654 in 2002. Of the population, 72.21% were Romanians, 15.31% Hungarians, and 11.24% Roma.

At the 2021 census, the city had a population of 20,604; of those, 65% were Romanians, 11.8% Roma, and 11.6% Hungarians.

== Culture ==
In 1962, the local Museum of History was opened, housing separate sections for archaeology, ethnography, natural science and numismatics. The present-day Unitarian Church, built in Gothic style in the 13th century, redecorated in 1599, houses a silver cup from 1636, as well as a silver plate and a bell dating from 1678. The wooden Orthodox Church, brought over from the Cornești village, had its interior painted by Nicolae Pop. The school in Boziaș was set up in 1780.

Other buildings in the city include the Romanian Orthodox Holy Trinity Cathedral (built 1939–1940), the Sfântul Gheorghe Church, and the Roman Catholic church.

== Natives ==
One of the main pillars of the Transylvanian School, Petru Maior, had connections with city — according to research, his father Gheorghe Maior, lived in Târnăveni by 1750, serving as a Greek-Catholic priest in the Seuca parish. Other natives include:

- Olga Bede (1908–1985), writer
- György Ligeti (1923–2006), composer
- Sergiu Muth (born 1990), footballer
- Ovidiu Oprea (born 1976), cyclist
- Emil Petru (1939–1995), footballer
- Gheorghe Riffelt (born 1936), rower
- Mircea Tuli (born 1957), weightlifter

== International relations ==
=== Twin towns — Sister cities ===
Târnăveni is twinned with:

- (Hungary) Hajdúszoboszló (since 1990)
- (France) Ronchin (since 1998)

== See also ==
- Castra of Târnăveni
- list of Hungarian exonyms (Mureș County)
