= Udvarhely County =

Administrative country of the Kingdom of Hungary

Udvarhely County Comitatus Udvarhelyensis (Latin) Udvarhely vármegye (Hungarian) Komitat Udvarhely (German)
- County of the Kingdom of Hungary (1876-1920, 1940-1945)
- Coat of arms

- Capital: Székelyudvarhely
- Area
  - Coordinates: 46°18′N 25°18′E
  - 1910: 2,938 km^{2} (1,134 sq mi)
- Population
  - 1910: 124,173
- History
  - Established: 1876
  - Treaty of Trianon: 4 June 1920
  - County recreated (Second Vienna Award): 30 August 1940
  - Disestablished: 1945
- Today part of: Romania
- Odorheiu Secuiesc is the current name of the capital.

Udvarhely (German: Oderhellen) was an administrative county (comitatus) of the Kingdom of Hungary. Its territory is now in central Romania (eastern Transylvania). The capital of the county was Székelyudvarhely (now Odorheiu Secuiesc).

== Geography ==
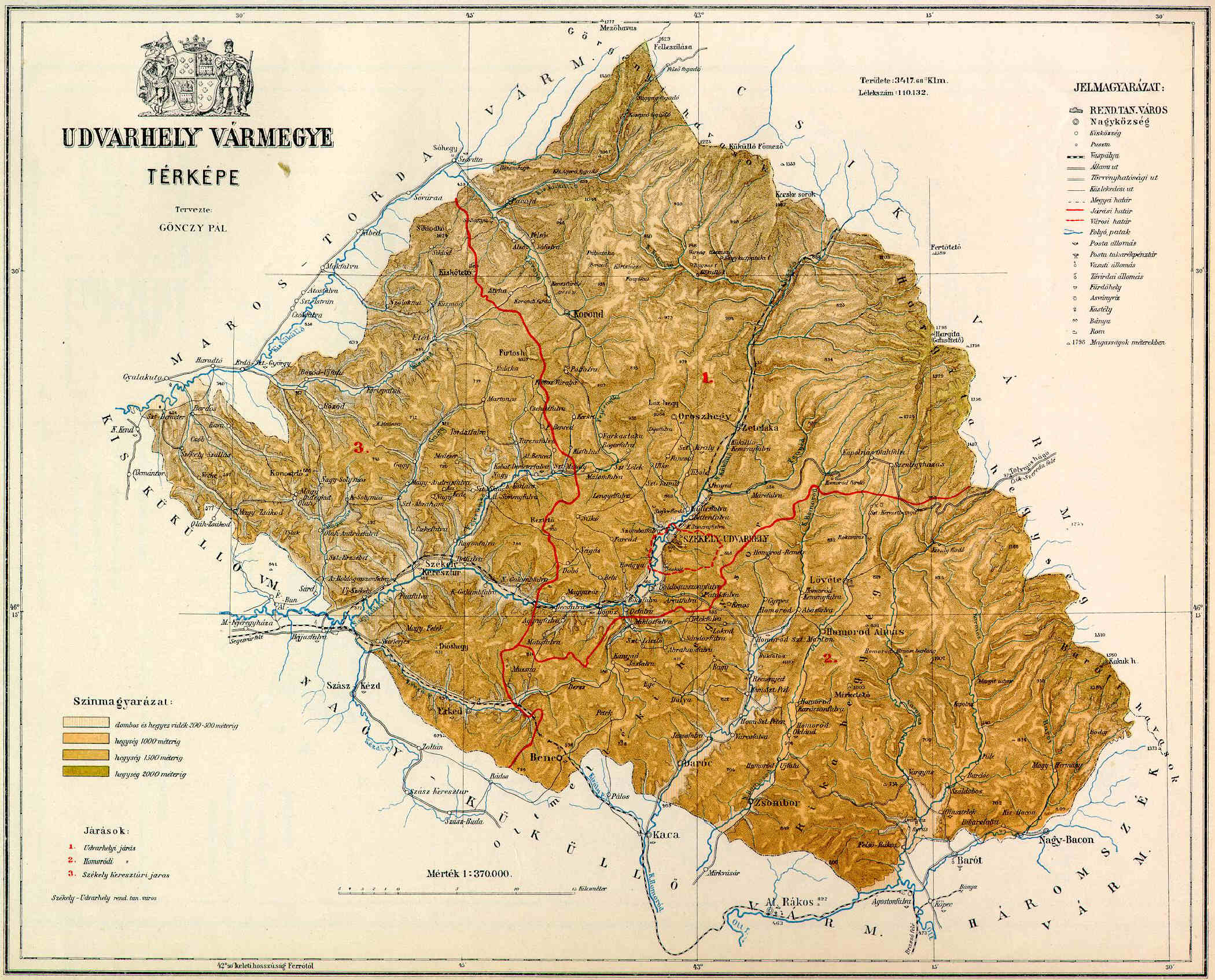
Map of Udvarhely, 1891.

Udvarhely county shared borders with the counties of Maros-Torda, Csík, Háromszék, Nagy-Küküllő, and Kis-Küküllő. The county lay in the Carpathian Mountains. Its area was 2,938 km^{2} around 1910.

== History ==
Udvarhely county consisted of three former seats of the Székelys: Udvarhelyszék, Bardóc and Keresztúr (the latter two as filial seats of the former). It was formed in 1876, when the administrative structure of Transylvania was changed. In 1920, by the Treaty of Trianon, the county became part of Romania until 1940 when, by the Second Vienna Award, much of its territory was reassigned to Hungary. After the end of World War II it became again part of Romania. Most of its territory lies in the present-day Romanian county of Harghita, with small parts in Mureș (a small part in the west) and Covasna (a small part in the south-east).

== Demographics ==
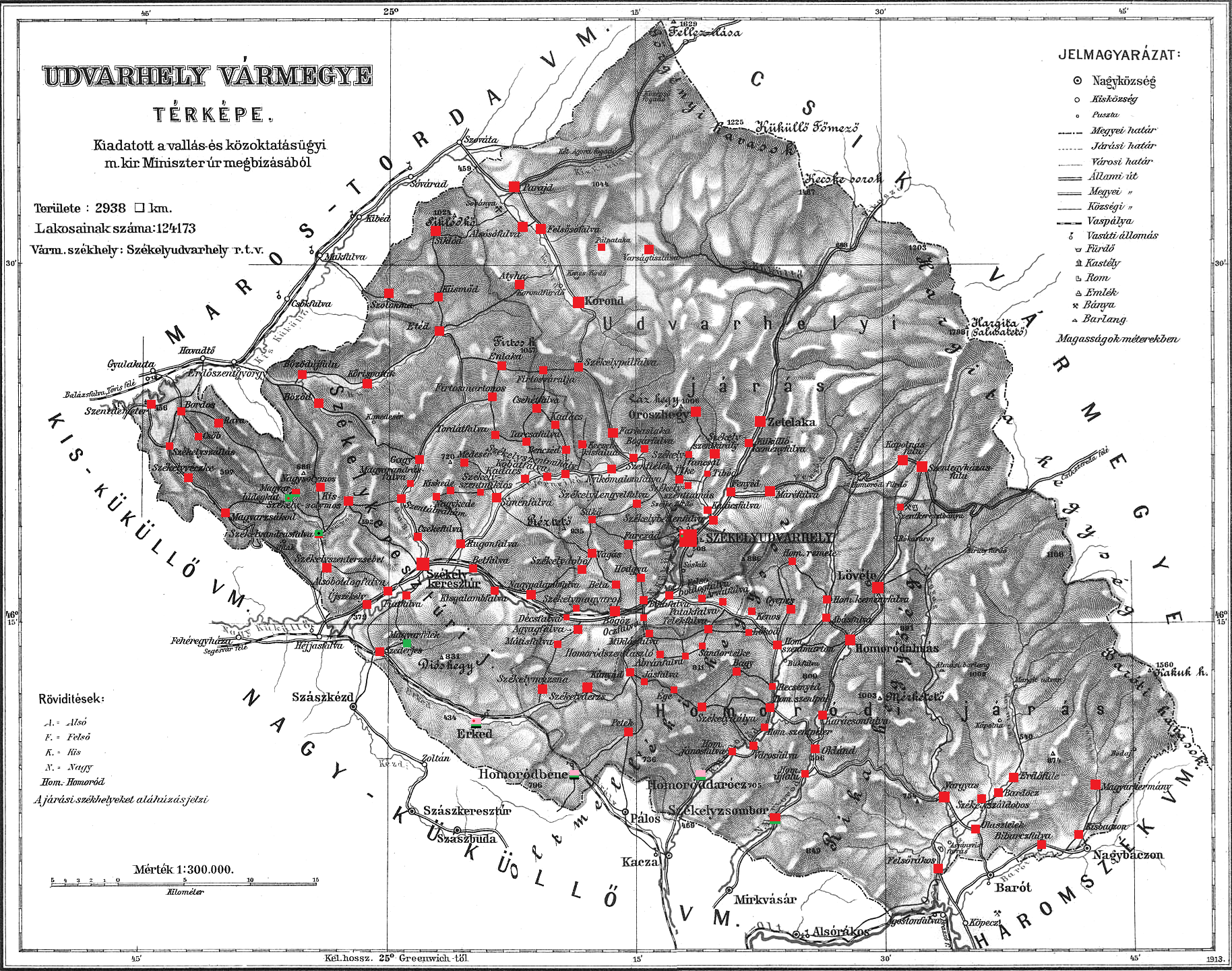
Ethnic map of the county with data of the 1910 census (see the key in the description)

Population by mother tongue (Note: Only linguistic communities > 1% are displayed.)
| Census | Total | Hungarian | Romanian | German | Other or unknown |
|---|---|---|---|---|---|
| 1880 | 105,520 | 94,311 (92.79%) | 3,099 (3.05%) | 2,322 (2.28%) | 1,910 (1.88%) |
| 1890 | 110,132 | 103,209 (93.71%) | 3,191 (2.90%) | 2,131 (1.93%) | 1,601 (1,45%) |
| 1900 | 118,275 | 112,607 (95.21%) | 2,928 (2.48%) | 2,225 (1.88%) | 515 (0.44%) |
| 1910 | 124,173 | 118,458 (95.40%) | 2,840 (2.29%) | 2,202 (1.77%) | 673 (0.54%) |

Population by religion (Note: Only religious communities > 1% are displayed.)
| Census | Total | Roman Catholic | Calvinist | Unitarian | Eastern Orthodox | Lutheran | Greek Catholic | Jewish | Other or unknown |
|---|---|---|---|---|---|---|---|---|---|
| 1880 | 105,520 | 35,050 (33.22%) | 36,533 (34.62%) | 24,451 (23.17%) | 4,121 (3.91%) | 2,747 (2.60%) | 2,010 (1.90%) | 581 (0.55%) | 27 (0.03%) |
| 1890 | 110,132 | 37,287 (33.86%) | 37,826 (34.35%) | 25,544 (23.19%) | 4,171 (3.79%) | 2,777 (2.52%) | 1,745 (1.58%) | 768 (0.70%) | 14 (0.01%) |
| 1900 | 118,275 | 41,893 (35.42%) | 40,237 (34.02%) | 26,614 (22.50%) | 4,101 (3.47%) | 2,830 (2.39%) | 1,387 (1.17%) | 1,204 (1.02%) | 9 (0.01%) |
| 1910 | 124,173 | 45,116 (36.33%) | 41,632 (33.53%) | 27,567 (22.20%) | 4,020 (3.24%) | 2,991 (2.41%) | 1,508 (1.21%) | 1,313 (1.06%) | 26 (0.02%) |

== Subdivisions ==
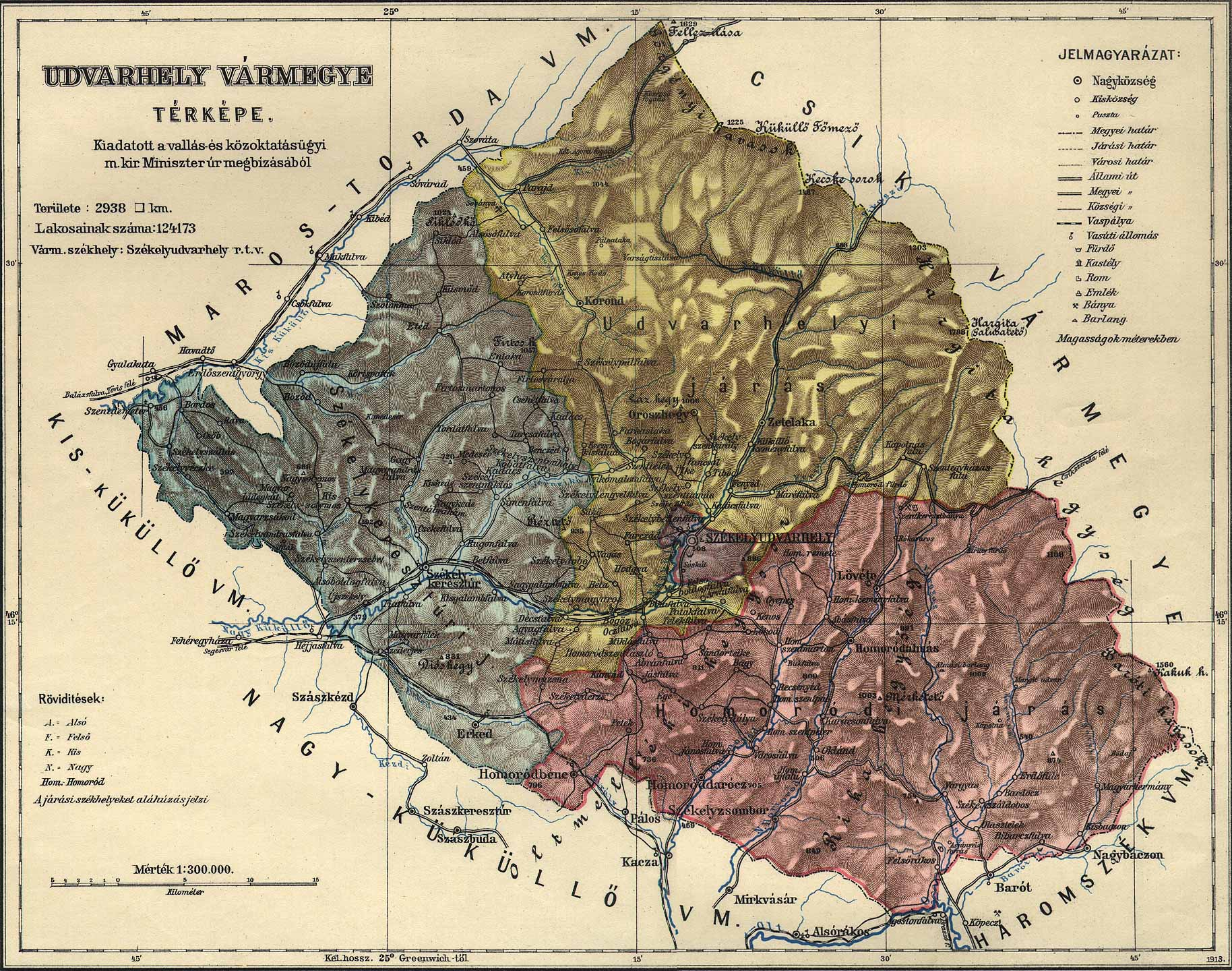
Contemporary map of the county

In the early 20th century, the subdivisions of Udvarhely county were:

Districts (járás)
| District | Capital |
|---|---|
| Homoród | Oklánd (now Ocland) |
| Parajd (from 1912) | Parajd (now Praid) |
| Székelykeresztúr | Székelykeresztúr (now Cristuru Secuiesc) |
| Udvarhely | Székelyudvarhely (now Odorheiu Secuiesc) |
Urban districts (rendezett tanácsú város)
Székelyudvarhely (now Odorheiu Secuiesc)
