= Medișoru =

Medișoru may refer to one of two villages in Harghita County, Romania:

- Medișoru Mare, a village in Șimonești Commune
- Medișoru Mic, a village in Avrămești Commune
