= Sándor Bródy =

Sándor Bródy may refer to

- Sándor Bródy (writer) (1863–1924), Hungarian writer
- Sándor Bródy (footballer) (1884–1944), Hungarian footballer
- Alexander Brody (businessman) (Sándor Bródy, 1933–2022), Hungarian-American businessman and writer
