= Alexander Brody (businessman) =

Hungarian-American businessman (1933–2022)

- Born: January 28, 1933; Budapest, Hungary
- Died: February 12, 2022 (aged 89)
- Education: Princeton University
- Occupation: Businessman

Alexander Brody (born Sándor Bródy, January 28, 1933 – February 12, 2022) was a Hungarian-American businessman, author, and marketing executive. He was the grandson of Hungarian writer Sándor Bródy.

== Life and career ==
Brody was born in Budapest, Hungary, on January 28, 1933. His father, János Bródy, raced horses and traded grain commodities in the period encompassing the two world wars. His mother, Lilly Bródy née Pollatschek, was a painter. He was a nephew of journalist Iles Brody and writer Sándor Hunyady. His family was Jewish and slowly rose into the upper class. Artists and scientists frequented the house, among them Nobel laureate physicist Dennis Gabor, the inventor of the krypton-filled fluorescent lamp, Imre Bródy, actress Gizi Bajor and film actor Csortos Gula.

In the late 1940s, Brody studied at Princeton University in the US. He was inspired by John von Neumann. Brody graduated in 1953 with degrees in Chinese, History and Philosophy. He worked at Young & Rubicam company for 34 years. During this period, Brody was sent to Frankfurt and the year after, he became Bureau Chief in Italy. He was a strong supporter of his employees, cancelling a major contract in order to defend them.

In 1981, the firm joined Dentsu, the international Japanese advertising group. Brody received a top managerial position. In 1987, he became president of Ogilvy & Mather.

Brody retired from his advertising activities in 1992 and returned to Hungary. His activities thereafter were mostly focused on the literary world. He was both a writer and an organizer of the Sandor Brody literary award for journalists in honour of his grandfather. Brody died on February 12, 2022, at the age of 88.

== Books ==
- Gondok és gondolatok (Thoughts and concerns), Seneca edition Budapest 1998, aphorism collection
- Húszezeregy éjszaka – Álmok és mesék a valóságról (Twentythousand and one night – Dreams and tales about the real world), Noran edition, 2001
- Alibi hat hónapra 1. Evés-ivás (Alibi for six months. Eating-drinking
- Alibi hat hónapra 2. Kert (Alibi for six months. Garden
