= Péter Farkas =

Péter Farkas may refer to:

- Péter Farkas (wrestler) (born 1968)
- Péter Farkas (footballer) (born 1987)
- Péter Farkas (writer) (born 1955)
