= Feernic =

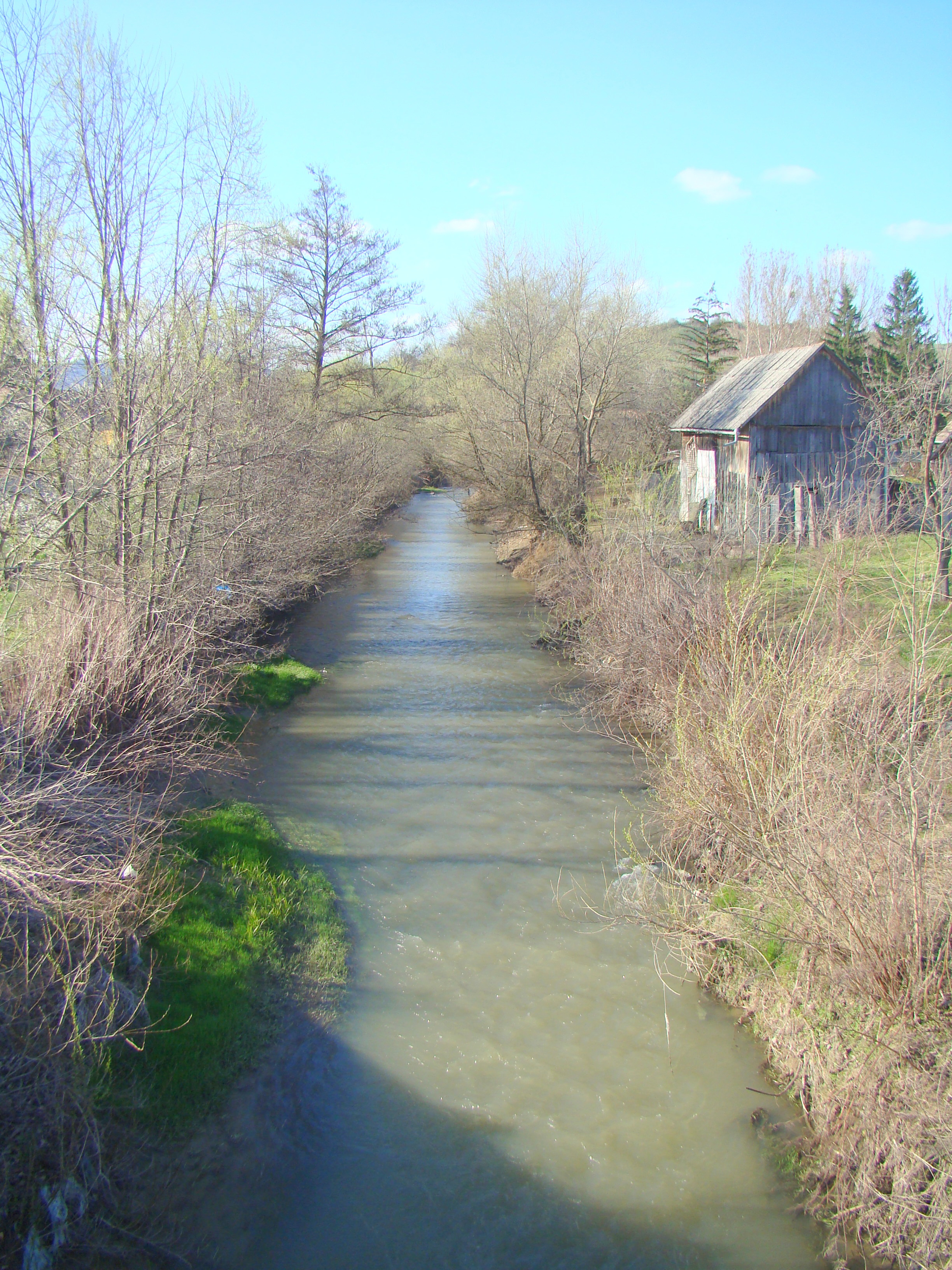

- Location within Romania

Location
- Country: Romania
- Counties: Harghita County
- Villages: Lupeni, Bisericani, Morăreni, Cobătești, Șimonești, Rugănești

Physical characteristics
- Mouth: Târnava Mare
  - location: Cristuru Secuiesc
  - coordinates: 46.2878°N 25.0616°E
- Length: 33 km (21 mi)
- Basin size: 195 km^{2} (75 sq mi)

Basin features
- Progression: Târnava Mare→ Târnava→ Mureș→ Tisza→ Danube→ Black Sea
- Tributaries
  - right: Gada, Salon, Feneș, Turdeni

The Feernic is a right tributary of the river Târnava Mare in Romania. It discharges into the Târnava Mare near Cristuru Secuiesc. Its length is 33 km (21 mi) and its basin size is 195 km^{2} (75 sq mi).
