= Feneș (Feernic) =

- Location within Romania

Location
- Country: Romania
- Counties: Harghita County
- Villages: Firtușu, Cehețel, Tărcești

Physical characteristics
- Mouth: Feernic
  - location: Cădaciu Mare
  - coordinates: 46.3573°N 25.1310°E
- Length: 8 km (5.0 mi)
- Basin size: 19 km^{2} (7.3 sq mi)

Basin features
- Progression: Feernic→ Târnava Mare→ Târnava→ Mureș→ Tisza→ Danube→ Black Sea

The Feneș is a right tributary of the river Feernic, in Romania. It flows into the Feernic in Cădaciu Mare. Its length is 8 km (5.0 mi) and its basin size is 19 km^{2} (7.3 sq mi).
