= Gada River =

Gada River may refer to:

- Gada, a tributary of the Bâsca Mică in Buzău County, Romania
- Gada - tributary of the Feernic in Harghita County, Romania
- Gada River (Nigeria) - a river in Nigeria
- Gada River (Uele), a river in Haut-Uelé province of the Democratic Republic of the Congo

== See also ==
- Gada (disambiguation)
