= Pârâul Stânei =

Pârâul Stânei may refer to the following rivers in Romania:

- Pârâul Stânei, a tributary of the Bâsca Mică in Buzău County
- Pârâul Stânei, a tributary of the Ghimbav in Argeș County
- Pârâul Stânei, a tributary of the Lotru in Vâlcea County
- Pârâul Stânei, a tributary of the Teleajen in Prahova County
- Valea Stânei, a tributary of the Goagiu in Harghita County
