= Kártyázó asszonyok =

1939 play by Sándor Hunyady

Kártyázó asszonyok is a Hungarian play written by Sándor Hunyady. It was first produced in 1939.
