= Péter Hunčík =

Hungarian-Slovak writer

- Born: 25 May 1951 (age 75); Šahy, Czechoslovakia
- Education: Comenius University (MUDr)
- Occupations: Writer and psychiatrist

Péter Hunčík (born 25 May 1951) is a Slovak psychiatrist and literary author of Hungarian ethnicity.

== Biography ==
Hunčík was born on 25 May 1951 in Šahy, Czechoslovakia. He is of Hungarian ethnicity. In late 2009, shortly before his 59th birthday, he won the prestigious Sándor Bródy prize, given annually to an author for the best first novel of the year.

As a psychiatrist, he authored several books, such as Tension Anticipation System (with Sándor Bordás, 1999), and its original, Hungarian version, Feszültség-Előrejelző Rendszer (1999).

In politics, he advocates normalization of bilateral relations between Hungary and Slovakia. He also authored two books, Magyarok Szlovákiában 1989–2004 ('Hungarians in Slovakia', with József Fazekas, 2004), and Global Report on Slovakia (with Martin Butora, 1997). He was briefly an advisor to Czechoslovak President Václav Havel. At this time he played a role in setting up TV Nova. He strongly opposed the separation of Czechoslovakia into the independent countries of the Czech Republic and Slovakia.

In 2009, he won the aforementioned Sándor Bródy award with his novel Határeset ("Borderline Case" or "Borderline Story"), after five years of work.

Péter Hunčík lives in the town of Dunajská Streda where he owns a private practice in psychiatry.
