= Áron Tamási =

Hungarian writer (1897–1966)

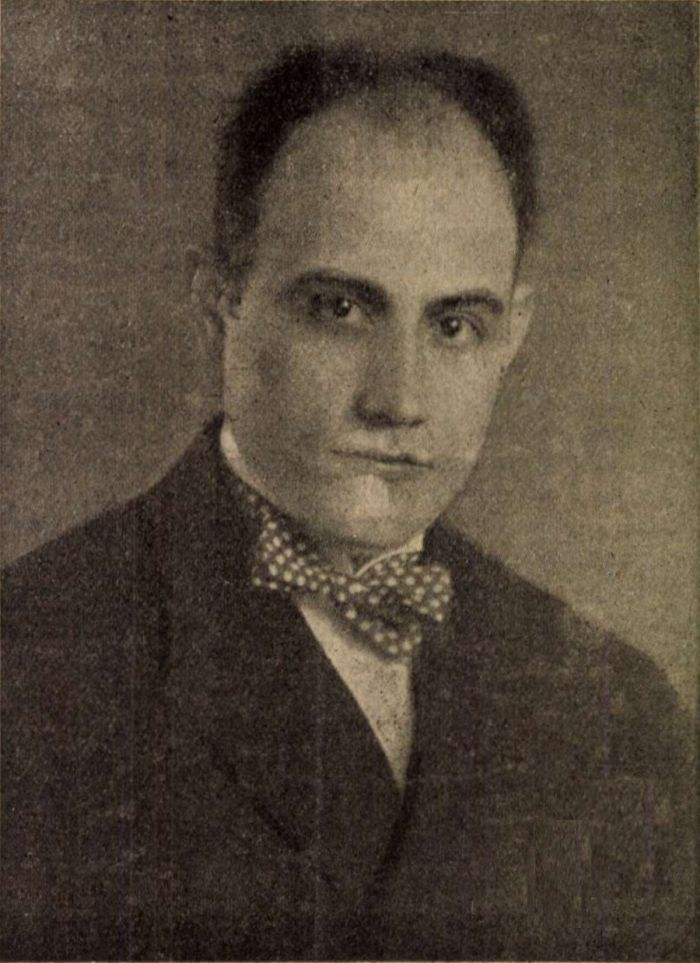
Áron Tamási

Áron Tamási (born: János Tamás; 20 September 1897 – 26 May 1966) was a Hungarian language writer from Romania. He became well known in his native region of Transylvania and in Hungary for his stories written in his original Székely style.

== Biography ==
Born to a Székely family in Farkaslaka in Udvarhely County, Kingdom of Hungary, Austria-Hungary (present-day Lupeni, Harghita County, Romania), he graduated in Law and Commerce at the Babeș-Bolyai University, Tamási emigrated to the United States in 1923, soon after Transylvania became part of Romania. He wrote his first Hungarian-language novels there, and these were soon published in Cluj, to widespread acclaim. He returned home in 1926 and lived in Transylvania until 1944.

One of Tamási's most famous works from this period was a novel trilogy about the adventures of a Székely boy called Ábel, a young forest ranger living alone in the Hargita Mountains. Tamási moved to Budapest in 1944, and lived there until his death in 1966. At his request, he was buried in his native Székely Land, an ethno-cultural region in eastern Transylvania, Romania.

== Works ==
- Szász Tamás, a pogány – Cluj, 1922 – short story
- Lélekindulás – Cluj, 1925 – short stories
- Szűzmáriás királyfi – 1928 – novel
- Erdélyi csillagok 1929 – short stories
- Címeresek – Cluj, 1931 – novel
- Helytelen világ – Cluj, 1931 – short stories
- Ábel a rengetegben – Cluj, 1932 – novel
- Ábel az országban – Cluj, 1934 – novel
- Ábel Amerikában – Cluj, 1934 – novel
- Énekes madár – Budapest, 1934 – drama
- Rügyek és reménység – Budapest, 1935 – short stories
- Jégtörő Mátyás – Cluj, 1936 – novel
- Tündöklő Jeromos – Cluj, 1936 – drama
- Ragyog egy csillag – Cluj, 1937 – novel
- Virágveszedelem – Budapest, 1938 – short stories
- Magyari rózsafa – Budapest, 1941 – novel
- Vitéz lélek – Budapest, 1941 – drama
- Csalóka szivárvány – Budapest, 1942 – drama
- Összes novellái – Budapest, 1942 – short stories
- A legényfa kivirágzik – Budapest, 1944 – short stories
- Hullámzó vőlegény – Budapest, 1947 – drama
- Zöld ág – Budapest, 1948 – novel
- Bölcső és bagoly – Budapest, 1953 – novel
- Hazai tükör – Budapest, 1953 – novel
- Elvadult paradicsom – Budapest, 1958 – short stories 1922–26
- Világ és holdvilág – Budapest, 1958 – short stories 1936–57
- Hegyi patak – 1959, drama
- Szirom és Boly – Budapest, 1960 – novel
- Játszi remény – Budapest, 1961 – short stories
- Akaratos népség – Budapest, 1962 – drama
- Hétszínű virág – Budapest, 1963 – short stories
