= Goagiu =

- Location within Romania

Location
- Country: Romania
- Counties: Harghita County
- Villages: Inlăceni, Firtănuș, Medișoru Mic, Goagiu, Avrămești, Cechești, Cristuru Secuiesc

Physical characteristics
- Mouth: Târnava Mare
  - location: Cristuru Secuiesc
  - coordinates: 46.2800°N 25.0262°E
- Length: 23 km (14 mi)
- Basin size: 92 km^{2} (36 sq mi)

Basin features
- Progression: Târnava Mare→ Târnava→ Mureș→ Tisza→ Danube→ Black Sea
- Tributaries
  - right: Valea Stânei

The Goagiu is a right tributary of the river Târnava Mare in Romania. It discharges into the Târnava Mare in Cristuru Secuiesc. Its length is 23 km (14 mi) and its basin size is 92 km^{2} (36 sq mi).
