= Sándor Hunyady =

Hungarian novelist and dramatist

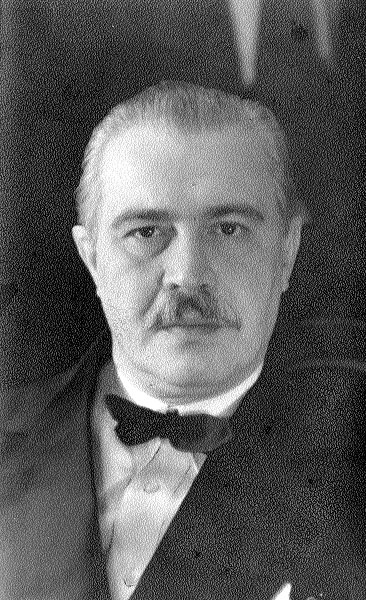
- Sándor Hunyady c. 1940
- Born: 15 August 1890; Kolozsvár, Austria-Hungary
- Died: 10 October 1942 (aged 52); Budapest, Hungary
- Resting place: Fiumei Road Graveyard
- Citizenship: Hungary
- Occupation(s): novelist, dramatist
- Years active: 1933-1942
- Parent(s): Sándor Bródy; Margit Hunyady

Sándor Hunyady (1890–1942) was a Hungarian novelist and dramatist.

== Works ==
=== Novels ===
- Diadalmas katona (elbeszélések), 1930
- Géza és Dusán (regény), 1932
- Téli sport (regény), 1934
- Családi album (regény), 1934
- Az ötpengős leány (elbeszélések), 1935
- A vöröslámpás ház (elbeszélések), 1937
- A tigriscsíkos kutya (eleszélések), 1938
- Nemes fém (regény), 1938
- Jancsi és Juliska (regény), 1939
- Kártyabotrány asszonyok között (regény), 1940
- A fattyú (regény), 1942
- Havasi levegőn (elbeszélések), 1952
- Olasz vendéglő (elbeszélések), 1956
- A hajó királynője (regény), Téli Sport (kisregény), 1969 (Réz Pál utószavával)
- Három kastély (cikkgyűjtemény), 1971
- Aranyifjú: Elbeszélések (1986) 963-207-722-9 (szerk. Illés Endre)
- Árnyék a napsütésben: Hunyady Sándor (1890-1942) elbeszélései, tárcái, karcolatai, valamint dokumentumok, visszaemlékezések (2000) 963-85829-7-9 (szerk. Urbán László Alexander Brody előszavával)
- Családi album: önéletrajz, 1934 (2000) 963-9048-70-4
- Aranyfüst: összegyűjtött novellák (2006) ISBN 963-7416-93-5 (szerk. Réz Pál)

=== Plays ===
- Júliusi éjszaka (1929)
- Feketeszárú cseresznye (1930)
- Pusztai szél (1931)
- Bakaruhában (1931)
- Erdélyi kastély (1932)
- Ritz, 1919 (1933)
- Aranyifjú (1933)
- A három sárkány (1935)
- Lovagias ügy (1935)
- The Golden Man (1936)
- Bors István (1938)
- Havasi napsütés (1939)
- Kártyázó asszonyok (1939)
- Nyári zápor (1941)
