= A három sárkány =

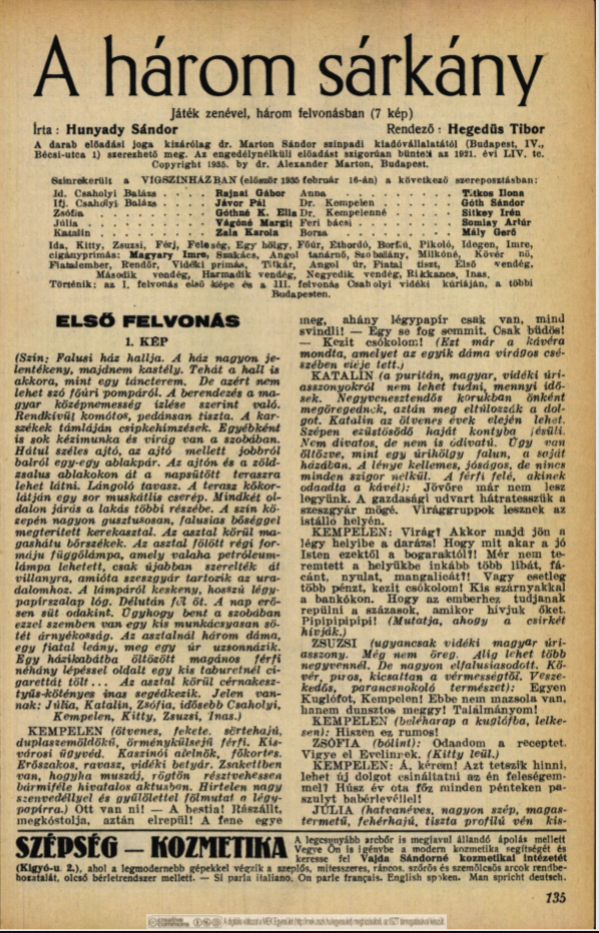
The first publishing of the play

A három sárkány is a Hungarian play, written by Sándor Hunyady. It was first produced in 1935.

It was adapted into a feature film in 1936.
