= György Dragomán =

Hungarian author and literary translator (born 1973)

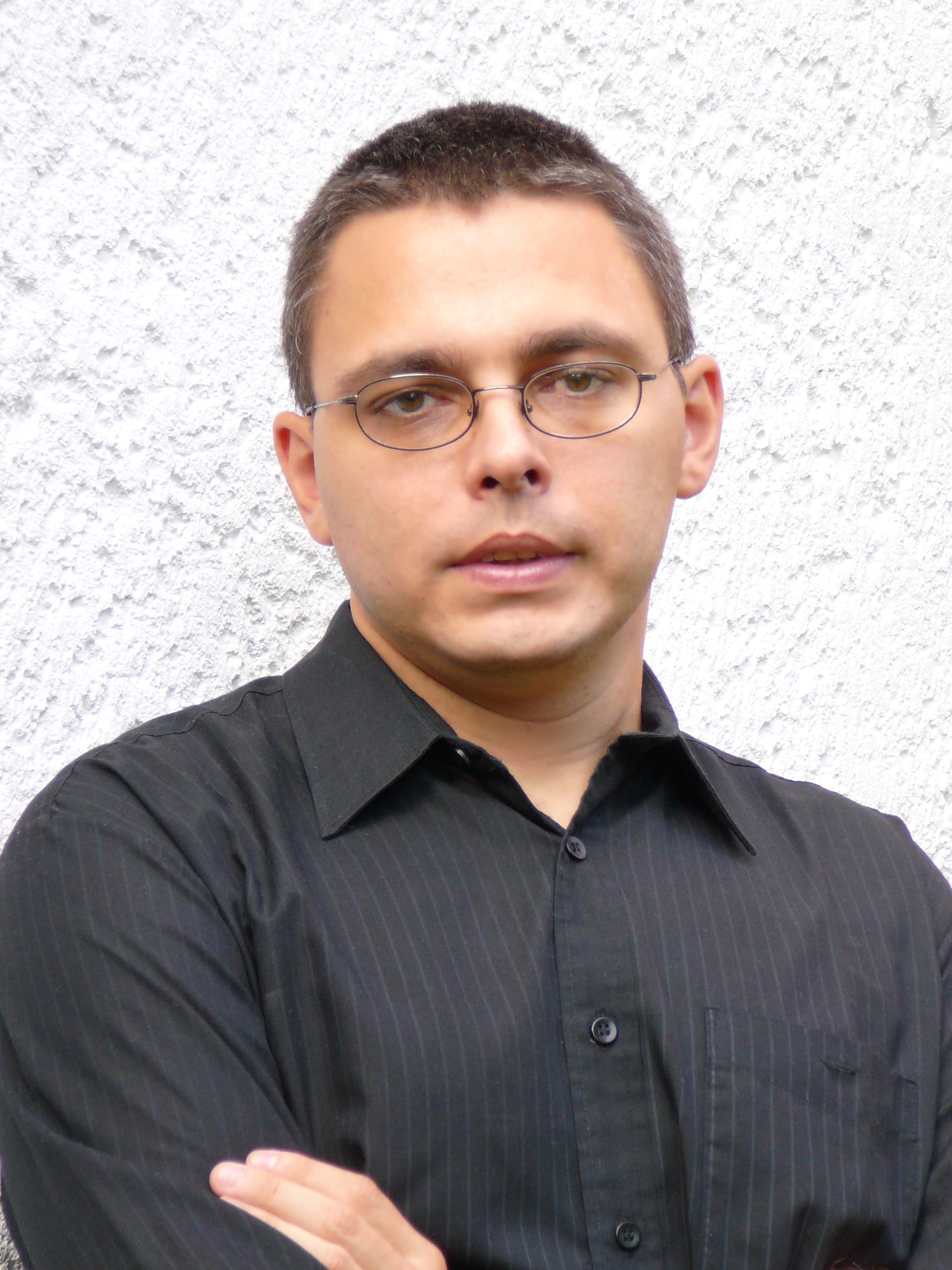

György Dragomán (born 10 September 1973) is a Hungarian author and literary translator. His best-known work, The White King (2005) has been translated to at least 28 languages.

He was born in Târgu Mureș (Marosvásárhely) Transylvania, Romania. In 1988, his family moved to Hungary. He attended high school in the western Hungarian city of Szombathely, then college in Budapest, getting a degree in English and Philosophy. He has received various literary awards for his writings, such as the Sándor Bródy Prize (2003).

His first novel, Genesis Undone, was published in 2002. He has become famous because of his second book, The White King, which received very favorable reviews from many influential newspapers, such as The New York Times. It is a collection of loosely connected stories told by an 11-year-old boy waiting for his father to be released from politically motivated imprisonment.

Dragomán lives in Budapest with his wife and two children.

== Works ==
- A pusztítás könyve, 2002 (lit. "The book of destruction" but often referred to as Genesis Undone)
- The White King, 2005 (original: A fehér király, English translation by Paul Olchvary and Doubleday/Houghton Mifflin, 2008)
- The Bone Fire, 2014 (original: Máglya, English translation by Paul Olchvary and Mariner Books, expected March 2018)
- Oroszlánkórus, 2015 (lit. "A Chorus of Lions", collection of short stories)

== Awards and honors ==
- 2002: Soros Fellowship
- 2002: Award for Excellence by the literary journal Mozgó Világ
- 2003: Sándor Bródy Prize
- 2006: Tibor Déry Prize
- 2006: Sándor Márai Prize
- 2006: Artisjus Prize (given by Society ARTISJUS Hungarian Bureau for the Protection of Authors' Rights)
- 2007: Attila József Prize
- 2008: Youth of March Prize (the name refers to the 1848 revolution in Hungary)
- 2010: special commendation by the literary journal Litera
- 2011: Jan Michalski Prize for Literature, The White King
- 2014: Gold Medal Prize
