= Árpád Ajtony =

Hungarian writer, dramaturg and academic (1944–2013)

- Born: January 9, 1944 (age 82); Székelykeresztúr, Northern Transylvania, Kingdom of Hungary
- Died: January 16, 2013 (aged 69); Paris, France
- Occupations: Writer, dramaturg, screenwriter, social psychologist, university professor

Árpád Ajtony (January 9, 1944 – January 16, 2013) was a Hungarian writer, dramaturg, screenwriter, social psychologist, and university lecturer in exile. He started his career as an avant-garde writer and became a significant figure in the Hungarian emigration in France before the political transition.

== Career ==
A descendant of the Transylvanian Armenian Ajtony family (original name: Ajváz/Ajváh), he was born in Székelykeresztúr, at the time in Hungary, now Cristuru Secuiesc, Romania. He moved to Budapest at a young age. His father, Dezső Ajtony, was a chief physician. He completed his university studies at the Faculty of Arts of the József Attila University (now University of Szeged), then transferred to the Faculty of Arts, Hungarian-history department of the Eötvös Loránd University in Budapest, where he graduated as a teacher in 1967. He then worked as a dramaturg at the Budapest Film Studio, participating in the work of the Béla Balázs Studio. His first publications appeared in 1968 in the spirit of the artistic avant-garde. His writings were also published in Hungarian journals in Yugoslavia. He contributed to the first samizdat, the Szétfolyóirat. After the cultural policy led by György Aczél did not tolerate his work, he emigrated to Paris in 1973. In France, he continued his studies at the University of Vincennes, attended social psychology courses, and obtained degrees in psychology in 1978 and in social psychology in 1981. He defended his doctoral thesis in 1981 on the national identity and self-image of Austria. He worked in psychiatric institutions and taught sociology and anthropology courses for healthcare workers. In the 1990s, he was invited to lecture at the University of Versailles, where he taught at the psychology department. In the 1970s and 1980s, he was a leading figure in the Hungarian emigrant cultural life in Paris. He lived in New York for half a year in 1983.

After the political changes in Hungary, he became involved again in the Hungarian film industry, primarily as a screenwriter and experimental film actor. He also organized French-Hungarian cultural events and research projects, mainly related to the psychological processes of ideological development and reassessment. During this period, his previously banned works began to be published, and for his book The Loss of the Empire, written in the 1970s, he received the Sándor Bródy Prize for first-time authors in 1999. His only son, Dániel, was born in 1999. He died in Paris, a week after his 70th birthday, on January 16, 2013.

== Major works ==
- Where the Island Begins (anthology, 1969)
- Different Every Day (anthology, 1971)
- Grey Magic (1972)
- The Loss of the Empire (1998)
- Why So Late? 1969–1972; Orpheus, Budapest, 2002

Scientific publications

- Conversion, Identity and Social Change (2000)
- Doubling and Differentiation of the Representation System. Between Memory and Current Events, Between Ideal and Real (with Stéphane Laurens, 2002)
- A Moment in the History of Psychodrama: Ferenc Mérei and Henri Wallon (2004)
- Can the Subject be Operationalized? (2004)

== Films ==
- Heavenly Lamb (actor, 1970)
- Chroniques Hongroises - Hungarian Chronicles I-II. (documentary, screenwriter, 1991)
- 68 (documentary, participant, 1998)
- Tales from the Lost Empire (TV film, writer, with Can Togay and Frigyes Gödrös 2004)

== Sources ==
- Chief ed. Péter Hermann, ed. (2008). Who's Who 2009 by MTI. Budapest: Magyar Távirati Iroda Zrt. p. 11.
- Ajtony Árpád Passed Away, hirado.hu, January 23, 2013.
- Ajtony Árpád Passed Away, litera.hu, January 23, 2013.
- Profile at the University of Versailles-Saint-Quentin-en-Yvelines website
