= Lovagias ügy =

1935 play by Sándor Hunyady

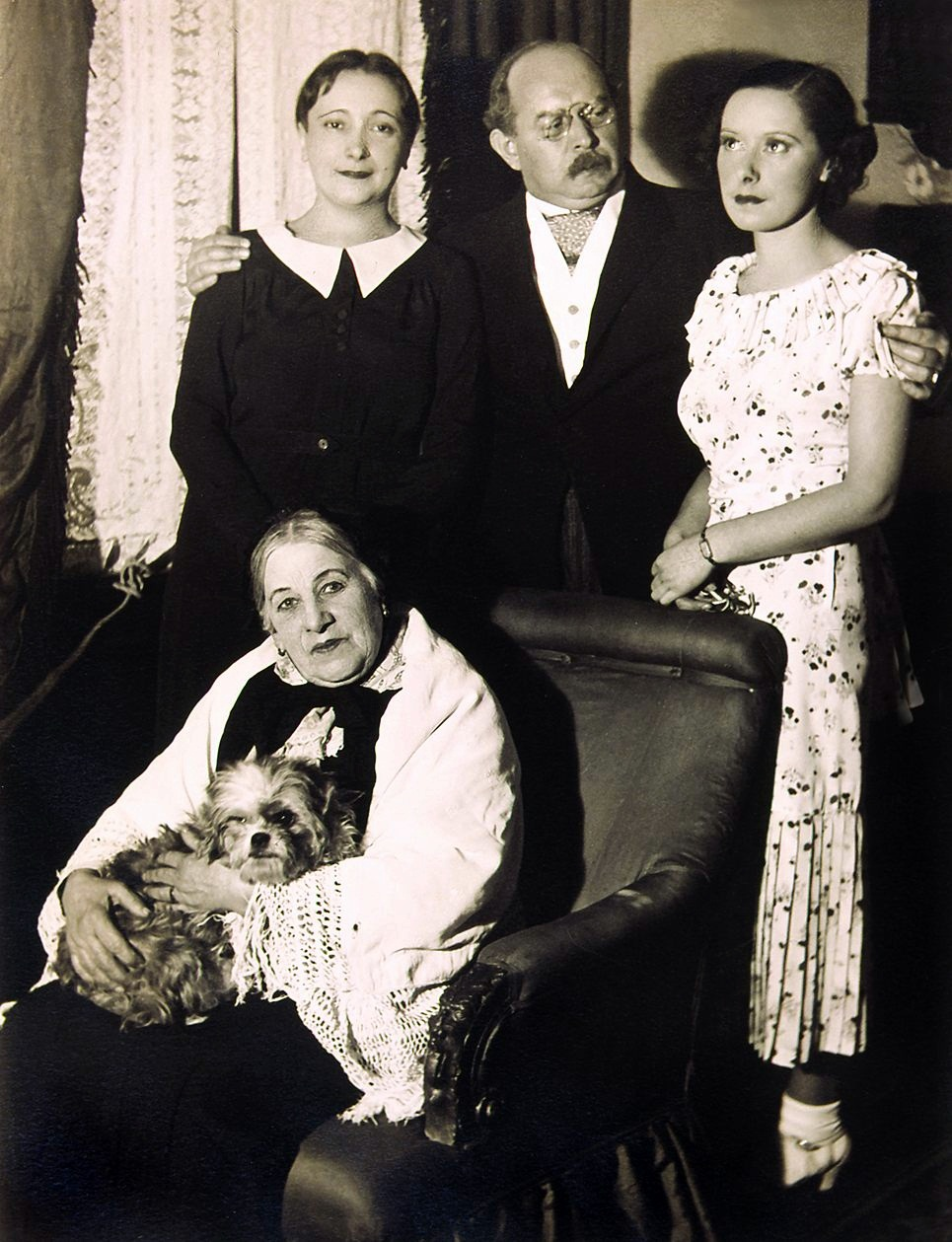
Lovagias ügy performed at the Pest Theater, March 23, 1935

Lovagias ügy (Hungarian for An Affair of Honor) is a Hungarian play, written by Sándor Hunyady. It was first produced in 1935. It is considered to be one of Hunyady's great dramas and was soon adapted for film.

Since its premiere, the work has been featured several times on Hungarian stage and abroad. In 1937, it played in Milan and Rome, Italy. Postwar performances took place in 1964, 1993, and 1996. More recently, Lovagias ügy was presented at Budapest's Karinthy Theater in 2012.
