= Feketeszárú cseresznye =

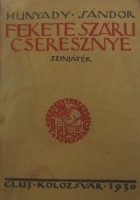
Feketeszárú cseresznye

Feketeszárú cseresznye is a Hungarian play by Sándor Hunyady. It was first produced in 1930. The 1933 movie by Richard Boleslawski with the title Storm at Daybreak is based on this story. The main roles are played by Kay Francis and Nils Asther.
