= Gada =

Gadha (Hindi: गधा) is the Hindi name for adonkey. Gada or Gadha may refer to:

- Gadha, Chhatarpur, a village in Madhya Pradesh, India
- Gadha, Nepal, a village development committee in Siraha District, Nepal
- Gadha (album), a 1998 album by Chandrabindoo
- Gadaa, an Oromo self-governance system
- Garha/GADA, a Jain caste of India
- Gada (mace), a club from the Indian subcontinent
- Gada, Nigeria, a local government area in Sokoto State
- Gadā, the pen name of a Chaghatay poet

== See also ==
- Gada River (disambiguation)
