= Krisztián Grecsó =

Hungarian writer, poet and editor (born 1976)

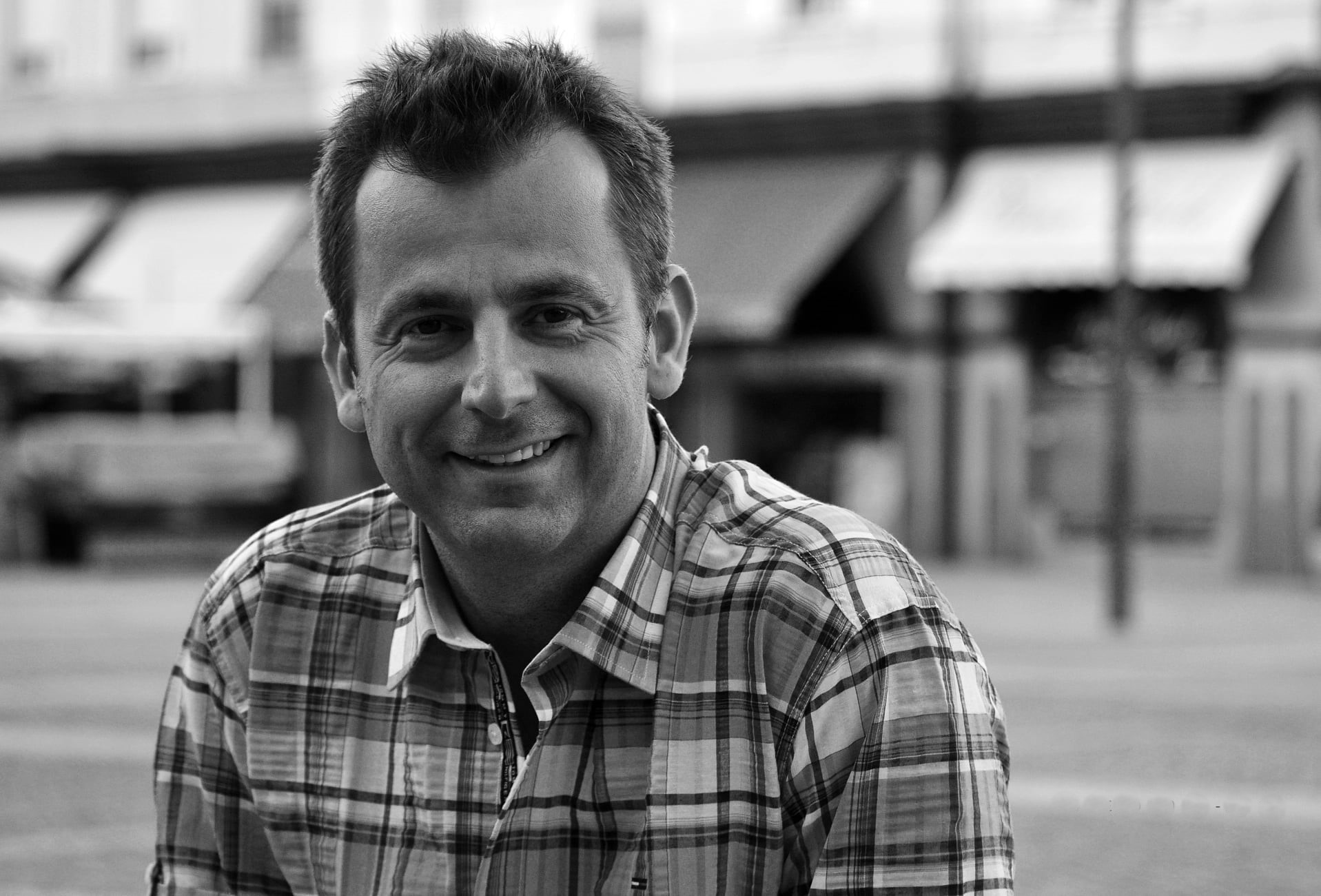
- Krisztián Grecsó
- Born: 18 May 1976 (age 50); Szegvár, Hungary
- Education: Attila József University
- Occupations: Writer, poet, editor
- Spouse: Judit Árvai
- Writing career
- Notable works: Pletykaanyu (2001); Megyek utánad (2011); Mellettem elférsz (2014); Vera (2019)
- Notable awards: Attila József Prize (2006)
- Website: grecso.hu

Krisztián Grecsó (born 18 May 1976) is a Hungarian writer, poet and editor.

== Biography ==
Grecsó was born in Szegvár on 18 May 1976. His younger brother, Zoltán Grecsó, is a dancer and choreographer. He graduated from the János Batsányi High School in Csongrád. In 2001, he received a diploma in Hungarian language and literature from the Attila József University in Szeged.

Between 2001 and 2006, Grecsó worked as an editor for the Bárka literary journal in Békéscsaba. From 2007 to 2009, he was a lead editor of the Nők Lapja women's magazine. In 2009, he became the lead editor of the prose and essay section of Élet és Irodalom. From 2006 to 2009, he served as vice-president of Szépírók Társasága ("Belletrists' Association").

In 2001, he achieved widespread fame with his short story collection Pletykaanyu ("Gossip Mom"). This was followed by a number of successful novels: Isten hozott ("Welcome", 2005), Tánciskola ("Dance School", 2008), Mellettem elférsz ("There's Room for You Beside Me", 2011), Megyek utánad ("I Follow You", 2014), Jelmezbál ("Costume Ball", 2016) and Vera (2019).

Grecsó also worked as a screenwriter for the films Hasutasok (2007) and Megy a gőzös (2007). He is the author of the play Cigányok ("Gypsies"), adapted from the play of the same name by Józsi Jenő Tersánszky, which opened at the József Katona Theatre in Budapest on 15 October 2010 under the direction of Gábor Máté. He wrote the book of the highly successful musical A Pál utcai fiúk, based on Ferenc Molnár's novel The Paul Street Boys, which premiered in the Comedy Theatre of Budapest on 5 November 2016.

== Personal life ==
He is married to Judit Árvai, a press relations associate of the Magvető publishing house. In 2019, they adopted a girl, Hanna. In October 2018, Grecsó was diagnosed with HPV-associated head and neck cancer. He recovered in early 2019.

== Works ==
- Angyalkacsinálás (1999; poetry)
- Pletykaanyu (2001; short stories)
- Isten hozott (2005; novel)
- Tánciskola (2008; novel)
- Mellettem elférsz (2011; novel)
- Megyek utánad (2014; novel)
- Jelmezbál: Egy családregény mozaikjai (2016; novel)
- Harminc év napsütés (2017; short stories)
- Vera (2019; novel)
- Magamról többet (2020; poetry)
- Belefér egy pici szívbe (2020; children's poetry)
- Valami népi (2022; short stories)
- Lányos apa (2023; short stories)
- Apám üzent (2024; novel)

== Awards and honours ==
- Zsigmond Móricz Fellowship (1999)
- Sándor Bródy Prize (2002)
- György Faludy Prize (2002)
- István Örkény Playwright Fellowship (2002)
- Tibor Déry Prize (2004)
- Attila József Prize (2006)
- AEGON Art Prize (2012)
