= Lupeni, Harghita =

Lupeni Farkaslaka
- Commune
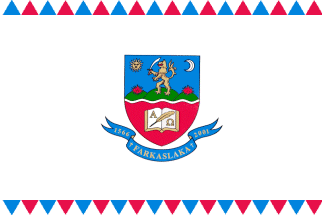
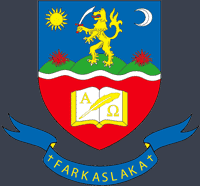
- Flag Coat of arms

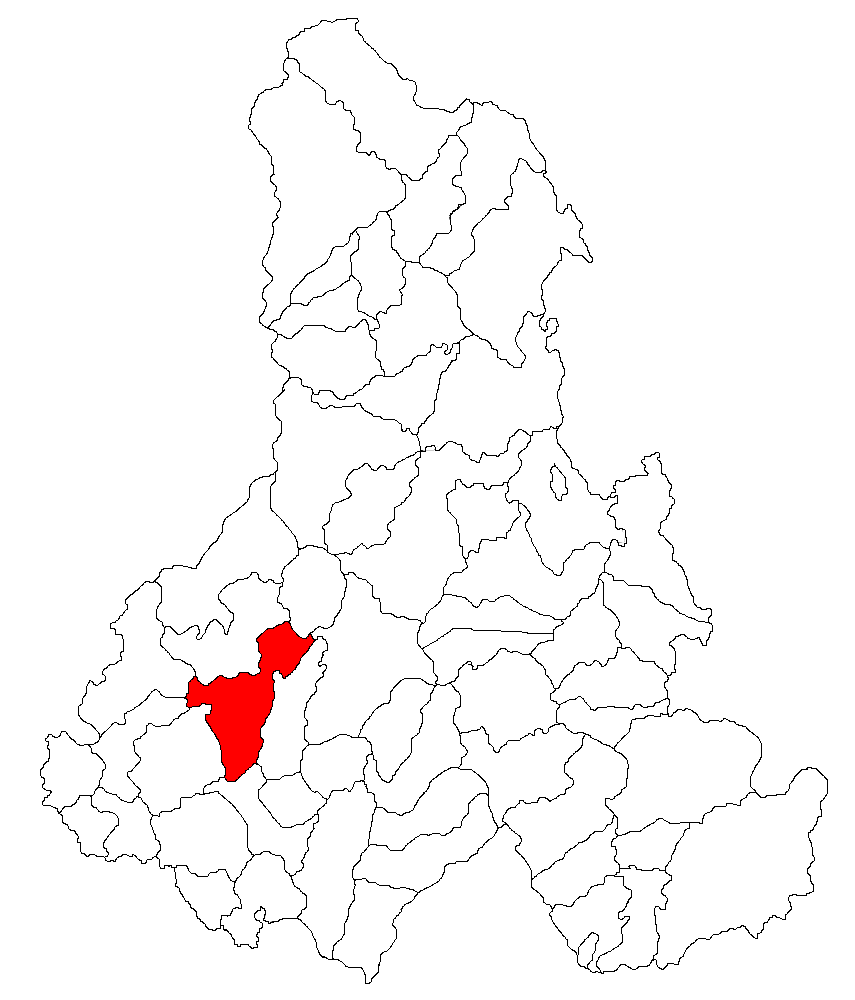
- Location in Harghita County

- Location in Romania
- Coordinates: 46°22′47″N 25°13′33″E
- Country: Romania
- County: Harghita

Government
  - Mayor (2020–2024): Lehel Kovács (UDMR)
- Area: 125.21 km^{2} (48.34 sq mi)
- Elevation: 580 m (1,900 ft)
- Population (2021-12-01): 4,547
  - Density: 36.31/km^{2} (94.06/sq mi)
- Time zone: UTC+02:00 (EET)
  - Summer (DST): UTC+03:00 (EEST)
- Postal code: 537165
- Area code: +(40) 266
- Vehicle reg.: HR
- Website: www.farkaslaka.ro

Lupeni (Hungarian: Farkaslaka, Hungarian pronunciation: [ˈfɒrkɒʃlɒkɒ], meaning "Wolf's Home") is a commune in Harghita County, Transylvania, Romania. It lies in the Székely Land, an ethno-cultural region in eastern Transylvania. The commune is composed of nine villages: Bisericani (Székelyszentlélek), Bulgăreni (Bogárfalva), Firtușu (Firtosváralja), Lupeni, Morăreni (Nyikómalomfalva), Păltiniș (Kecset), Păuleni (Székelypálfalva), Satu Mic (Kecsetkisfalud), and Sâncel (Szencsed).

== Geography ==
Lupeni is located in the southwestern part of the county, 13 km (8.1 mi) northwest of Odorheiu Secuiesc, on the road to Corund and Sovata. It lies on the banks of the river Feernic (Hungarian: Fehér Nyikó) and its right tributary, the Feneș. The usually small Feernic stream became so swollen in the catastrophic floods of 2005 when 11 cm (4.3 in) of rain fell in the space of two hours, that three people lost their lives when they were swept away as the water rose over four meters.

The route of the Via Transilvanica long-distance trail passes through the villages of Firtușu, Păuleni, and Lupeni.

== History ==
The commune was historically part of the Székely seat of Udvarhelyszék until 1876. After the administrative reform in the Kingdom of Hungary it became a part of the Udvarhely County. In the aftermath of World War I, the Union of Transylvania with Romania was declared in December 1918. At the start of the Hungarian–Romanian War of 1918–1919, the locality passed under Romanian administration. After the Treaty of Trianon of 1920, it became part of the Kingdom of Romania and fell within plasa Odorhei of Odorhei County during the interwar period.

In 1940, the Second Vienna Award granted Northern Transylvania to Hungary. Towards the end of World War II, Romanian and Soviet armies entered the area in September 1944. The territory of Northern Transylvania remained under Soviet military administration until 9 March 1945, after which it became again part of Romania. In 1950, after Communist Romania was established, Lupeni became part of the Odorhei Raion of Stalin Region. Between 1952 and 1960, the commune fell within the Magyar Autonomous Region, between 1960 and 1968 the Mureș-Magyar Autonomous Region. After the administrative reform of 1968, the region was abolished, and since then, the commune has been part of Harghita County.

== Demographics ==
The commune has an absolute Székely (Hungarian) majority. According to the 2002 census it had a population of 4,434, of which 99.28% or 4,402 were Hungarians. In 2004, half of the population of the village was engaged in charcoal burning as their principal business. At the 2021 census, Lupeni had 4,547 inhabitants, of which 95.43% were Hungarians.

== Notable people ==
Lupeni is the birthplace of the famous Hungarian writer Áron Tamási (1897–1966), known for such works as Címeresek and the Ábel trilogy.

== Landmarks ==
- The Roman Catholic church was built between 1842 and 1848 in classicist style in the honour of Saint John of Nepomuk
- The grave of Áron Tamási (1897–1966), Székely writer, can be seen between two Turkey oaks behind the church, his memorial is the work of Jenő Szervátiusz and Tibor Szervátiusz. Today, his birthhouse is open to the public as a museum.

== Twinnings ==
The commune is twinned with:

- Ajak, Hungary
- Lengyeltóti, Hungary
- Kemence, Hungary

== Gallery ==
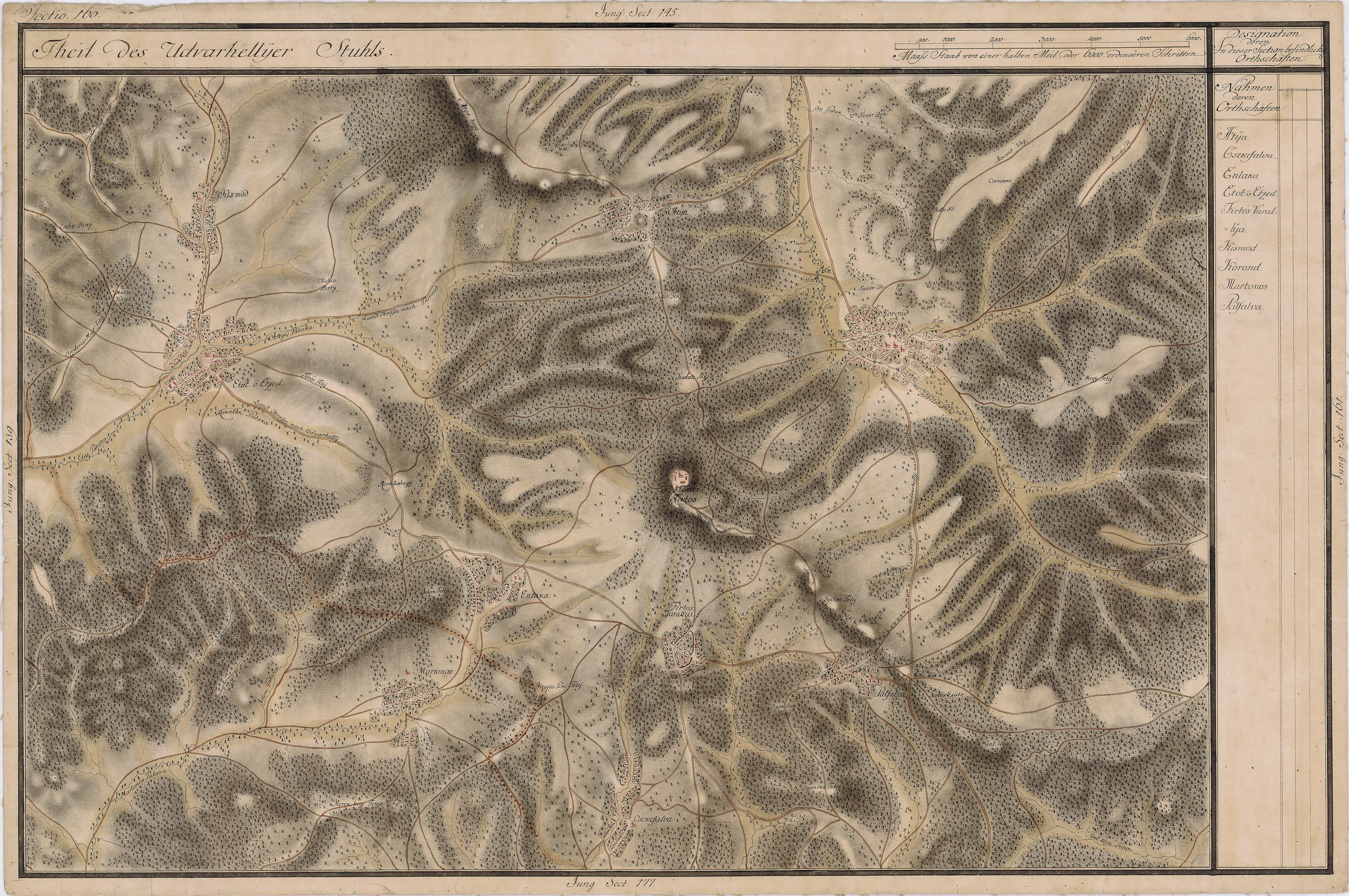
As Palfalva (Păuleni) and Firtos Varallya (Firtuşu) on Josephinische Landaufnahme, 1769-73

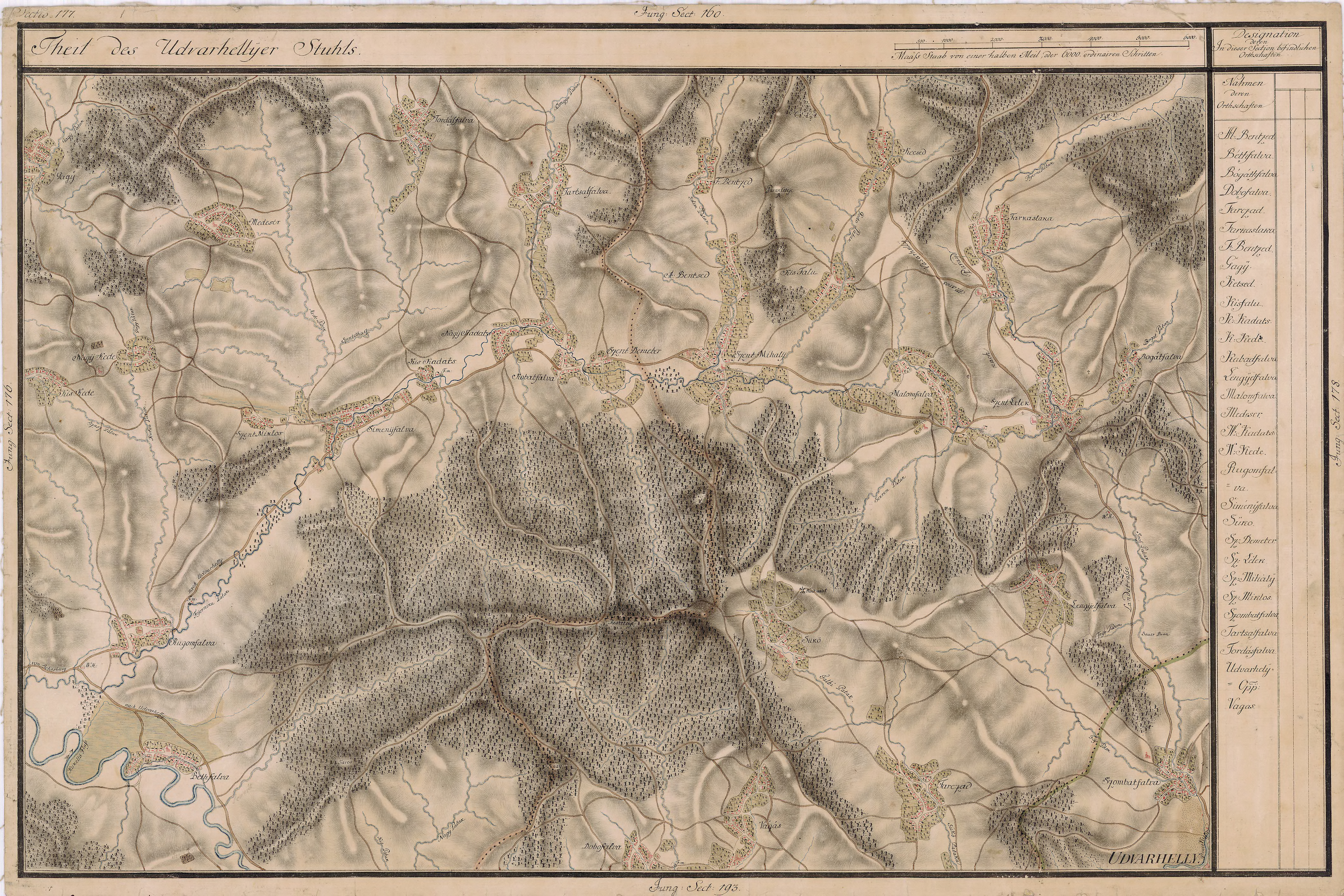
As Farkaslaka (Lupeni), Kecset (Păltiniş), Kis Falu (Satu Mic) and Szent Lélek (Bisericani) on Josephinische Landaufnahme, 1769-73
