= Júliusi éjszaka =

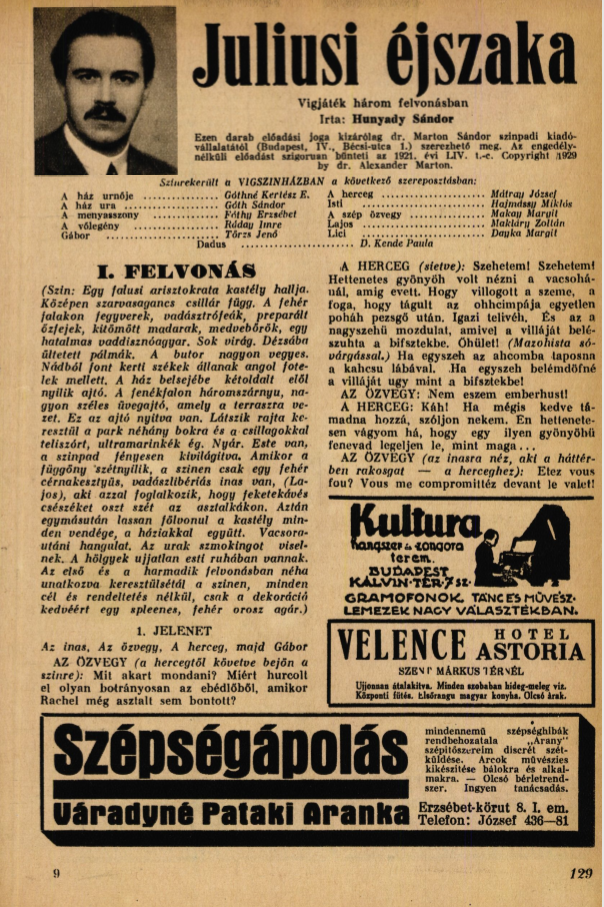
First publishing of the play

Júliusi éjszaka is a Hungarian play, written by Sándor Hunyady. It was first produced in 1929.
