= Péter Farkas (writer) =

Hungarian-German writer (born 1955)

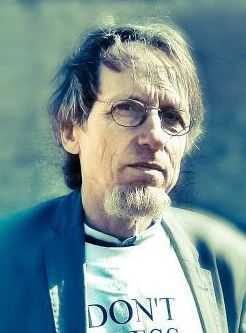
Farkas Péter

Péter Farkas (born 15 November 1955, in Budapest) is a Hungarian-German writer living in Cologne, Germany.

Starting in the late seventies he was active in Hungary’s democratic opposition as editor of the samizdat Túlpartról (‘From the Far Side’, 1979). In Cologne he founded the Humane Gesellschaft für geistige Nekrophilie and Verlag IL, where he was an organizer of visual arts events and publisher of the arts series Edition Nekrophil (Hermann Nitsch, Jürgen Klauke, Endre Tot, Curtis Anderson etc.).

His main work Gólem, an essayistic hypertext novel is considered the first significant Hungarian hyperfiction. Péter Farkas became known to a wider audience with his novel Acht Minuten, which was published in multiple languages

Farkas is a recurring publisher in the Hungarian Lettre Internationale. In 1997 he was awarded the Sándor Bródy Prize for Hungary’s best first novel of the year. In 2010, Farkas received the Sándor Márai Prize awarded by the Hungarian Ministry of Education and Culture, for his innovatively poetic style of prose.

== Works (selection) ==
Gólem, Hypertext 1996–2005
Nyolc Perc, Magvető, Budapest 2007
Kreatúra, Magvető, Budapest 2009
Johanna, Magvető, Budapest 2011
Nehéz esök (Hard Rain), Magvető, Budapest 2013
