= Iles Brody =

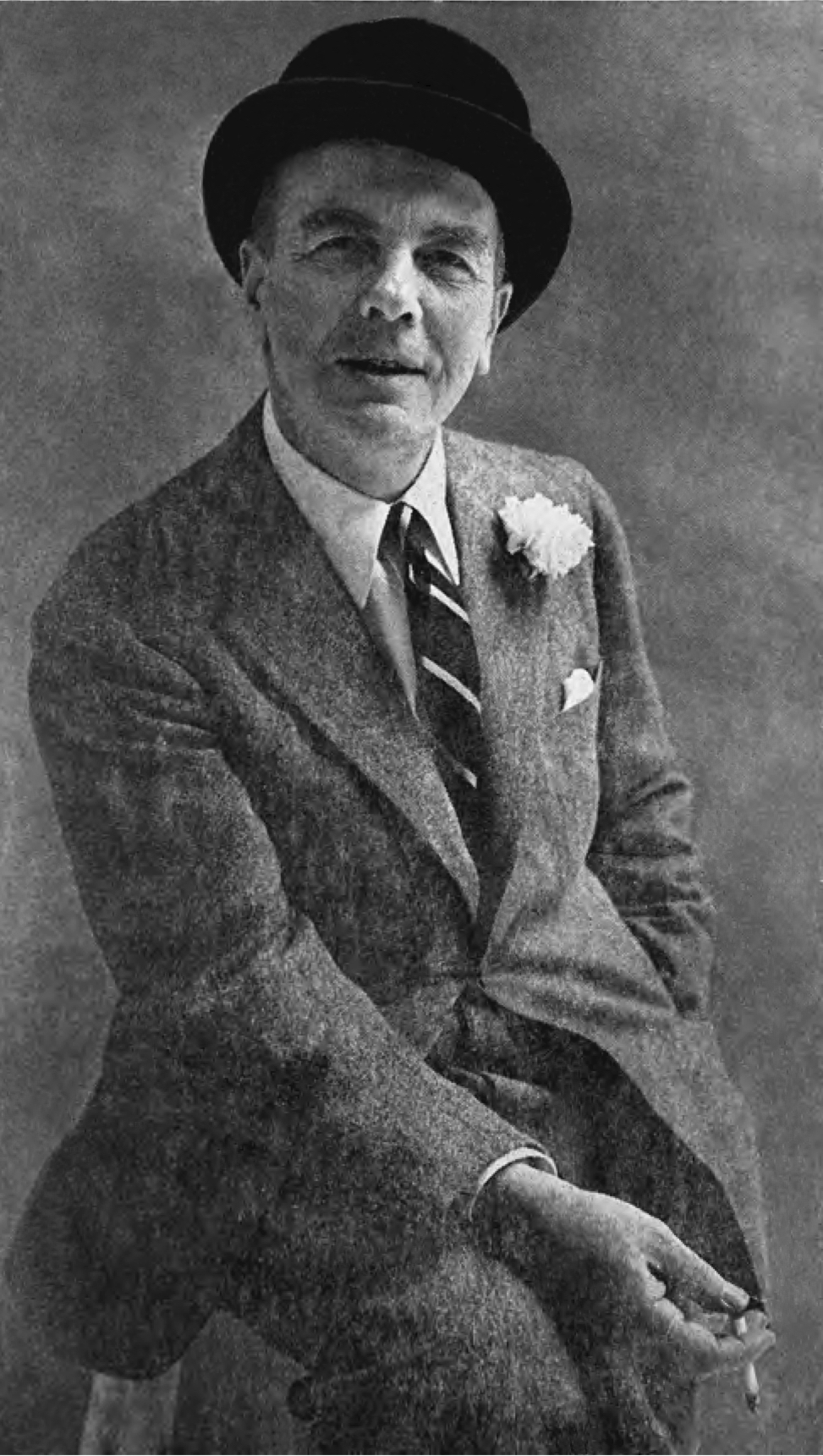
- Brody c. 1953
- Born: Illés Bródy; December 27, 1899; Budapest, Hungary
- Died: November 11, 1953 (aged 53); San Francisco, California, U.S.
- Other name: Elias Brody
- Occupation: Writer
- Notable work: Gone with the Windsors
- Spouse(s): Vera Robertson (1927–1932; divorced); Marie Hollingsworth (1938–??; likely divorced); Sanna Klaveness (1949–1953; his death)
- Relatives: Sándor Bródy (father)

Illés Bródy ([ˈileːʃ] EE-laysh, December 27, 1899 – November 11, 1953) (Note: His Hungarian birth and marriage records give his date of birth as December 27, 1899. Later sources give differing birth dates ranging from December 25–26, 1898–1900. Contemporary newspaper obituaries variously gave his age at death as 54 or 55.) was a Hungarian-born journalist and writer who lived in the United States from the 1930s. After a false start as a portrait artist, he became known as a food writer and gourmet. For his writing career he spelled his name Iles Brody; others sometimes anglicized his name as Elias Brody.

== Early life ==
Brody was born in Budapest, Hungary, the youngest son of writers Sándor Bródy and Isabella Rosenfeld. His family was Jewish. After serving in the Hungarian cavalry in his youth, he travelled extensively throughout Europe.

In 1927, he married American Follies dancer Vera "Kittens" Leightmer (née Robertson, 1899–1997). The couple had met in Paris, married in Budapest, and settled in New York City, but the marriage proved tumultuous and ended in divorce in 1932: Brody (then described as a portrait artist) had reportedly bashed Leightmer prior to their engagement, and attempted suicide several times during the course of their relationship. The couple was also involved in a highly publicized court case when Leightmer unsuccessfully sued a prominent American banker, Jefferson Seligman, for breach of promise.

In 1932, after separating from Leightmer, Brody was convicted in London, England of blackmailing two American sisters, Mildred Reid Burke and Constance Reid Netcher. Although he maintained his innocence, he was jailed for ten months and was deported from England after serving his sentence.

In 1938, after returning to the U.S., he married Marie Hollingsworth in Virginia. This marriage appears to have also ended in divorce prior to 1949.

== Later writing career ==
In the late 1930s, Brody returned to New York City, where he became a regular columnist for Esquire magazine. As a former cavalry officer, his early contributions were on equestrian sports and horsemanship. He later became a food writer, with a long-running column called "Man the Kitchenette", which – somewhat unusually for the era – offered culinary advice intended for a male readership. He also wrote for Gourmet magazine.

Brody published two books relating to gastronomy: On the Tip of My Tongue (1944) and The Colony: Portrait of a Restaurant and its Famous Recipes (1945), a history of the noted New York restaurant.

His third and final book, for which he is probably best remembered, was Gone with the Windsors (1953), a best-selling exposé of Edward VIII and Wallis Simpson, the Duke and Duchess of Windsor. American critic E.V. Durling described it as "the most brilliantly written book so far dealing with the lives and loves of the Duke and Duchess." Other reactions were less favorable: the British tabloid The People denounced the work as "scurrilous", called attention to Brody's 1932 blackmail conviction, and discouraged Brody's prospective British publishers from publishing the book in Britain. Brody had struggled for three years to find a U.S. publisher for Gone with the Windsors, and was reportedly pressured by associates of the Duke and Duchess not to publish the book. The Duchess of Windsor is reported to have expressed relief when Brody died shortly after its publication.

== Death ==
Brody died suddenly of a heart attack on November 11, 1953, while staying at the Palace Hotel in San Francisco. He was survived by his third wife, Sanna Klaveness, whom he had married in 1949.

== Bibliography ==
- On the Tip of My Tongue (1944)
- The Colony (1945)
- Gone with the Windsors (1953)
