= Sándor Bródy Prize =

Hungarian literary award

The Sándor Bródy Prize is a Hungarian literary award founded in 1995 by Alexander Brody, a Hungarian American, in honor of his grandfather, the Hungarian writer Sándor Bródy. It is given annually, for the best first novel of the year. It carries a monetary award, and financial assistance to the publication of the second novel of the author.

== Winners ==
- 1995: Simon Balázs, Szilasi László
- 1996: Hamvai Kornél
- 1997: Péter Farkas, Salamon András
- 1998: Zoltán Gábor
- 1999: Ajtony Árpád
- 2000: Jusztin Harsona
- 2001: Szálinger Balázs
- 2002: Krisztián Grecsó
- 2003: György Dragomán
- 2004: Murányi Zita and Nagy Gabriella
- 2005: Gazdag József
- 2006: Szakács István
- 2007: Harcos Bálint
- 2008: Dunajcsik Mátyás
- 2009: Peter Huncik
- 2010: Angi Máté
- 2011: Edina Szvoren
- 2012: Gabor Kálmán
