= Sándor Bródy (writer) =

Hungarian author and journalist (1863–1924)

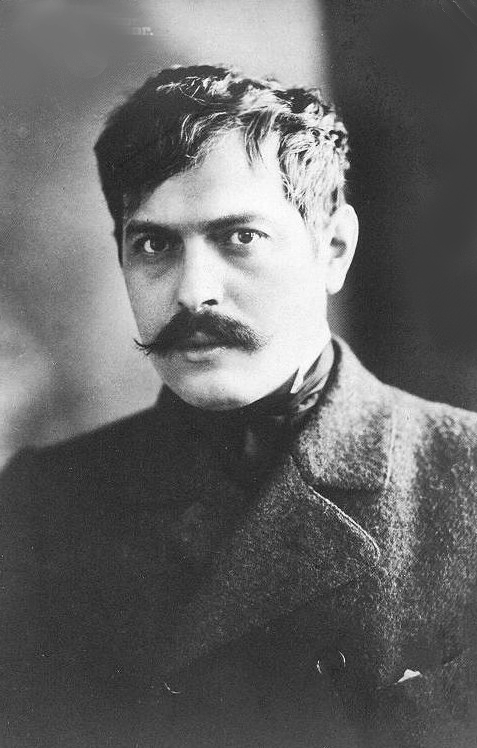
- Born: 23 July 1863; Eger, Hungary
- Died: 12 August 1924 (aged 61); Budapest, Hungary
- Occupations: Writer, journalist
- Spouse: Izabella Rosenfeld
- Partner: Margit Hunyady
- Children: 6; including Sándor Hunyady and Iles Bródy
- Relatives: Imre Bródy; Alexander Brody

Sándor Bródy (23 July 1863 – 12 August 1924) was a Hungarian author and journalist.

== Biography ==
Bródy was born in Eger, Hungary. His family was Jewish. After attending the schools of Eger he devoted himself entirely to literature. From 1888 to 1890 he was editor of the "Erdélyi Híradó", published at Kolozsvár (present-day Cluj-Napoca), and was also connected with the "Erdélyi Képes Ujság" and the political daily "Magyarság". Since 1890 he was a member of the "Magyar Hírlap", and since 1882 a prolific contributor of articles, feuilletons, stories, and novels to the leading literary publications of Hungary. In his works he depicts the dark side of life, and is a disciple of the modern French realistic school.

In 1995, the literary award Sándor Bródy prize recognizing the best first novel of the year published in Hungarian was established in his honor by his grandson, the Hungarian American Alexander Brody.

Bródy Sándor utca, named after him, is located in central Budapest. Map of Brody Sandor Utca

Brody House hotel and club is named after him.

== Personal life and family ==
Brody had a relationship with actress Margit Hunyady, with whom he had a son out of wedlock, the writer Sandor Hunyady (1890–1942). In 1890, Brody married Izabella Rosenfeld (1869–1908), herself an author who wrote under the pen name Judit Féher. They had five children: a daughter, Maria (1891–1899), followed by four sons, András (1892–1964), István (1894–1981), János (1898–1962), and Illés (1899–1953).

== Literary works ==
The following are his principal works:

- "Regénytárgyak" (Fictional objects), tales, 1892
- "A kétlelkű asszony" (The woman with two souls), novel, 1893
- "Az Egri diákok" (The students of Eger), 1894
- "Nyomor" (Misery), stories, 1884
- "Faust orvos" (Faust the medic), novel, 1888–1890
- "Don Quixote kisasszony" (Miss Don Quixote), novel, 1888
- "Emberek" (People), stories, 1888
- "Színészvér" (Actor's blood), stories, 1891
- "Hófehérke" (Snow white), novel, 1894
- "Apró regények" (Miniature novels), 1895
- "Két szőke asszony" (Two fair women), novel, 1895
- "Éjszaka" (At night), stories, 1895
- "Rejtelmek" (Puzzles), stories, 1895
- "Az asszonyi szépség" (Womanly beauty), 1897
- "Tündér Ilona" (Fairy Ilona), novel, 1898
- "Az ezüst kecske" (The silver goat), de luxe edition, 1898
- "Egy férfi vallomásai" (Confessions of a gentleman), 1899
- "Fehér könyv" (White book), 1900–1901

Bródy enjoys a wide popularity. All his works have been translated into German, and many of his shorter ones have also appeared in French, English, Danish, Croatian, Romanian, and Serbian newspapers and other periodicals. His contributions to the "Magyar Hirlap" are mostly of a political or critical nature. In 1901 he adapted his novel "Hófehérke" for the stage, and it was frequently performed at the National Theatre in Budapest.

== Bibliography of Jewish Encyclopedia ==
- Szinnyei Magyar Irok Tára;
- Pallas Nagy Lexikona, s.v.
