= Avrămești =

Avrămești Szentábrahám
- Commune
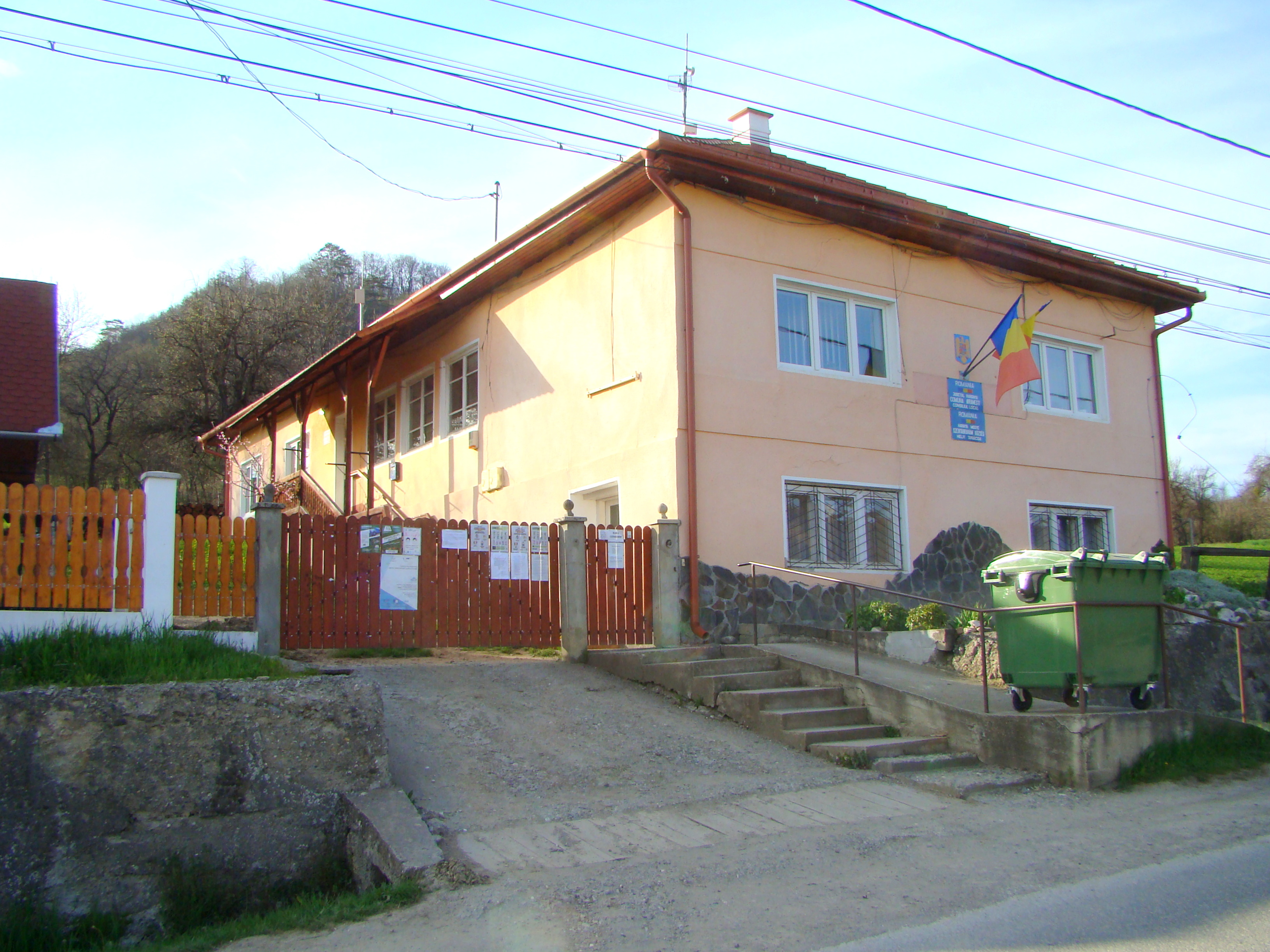
- Avrămești town hall

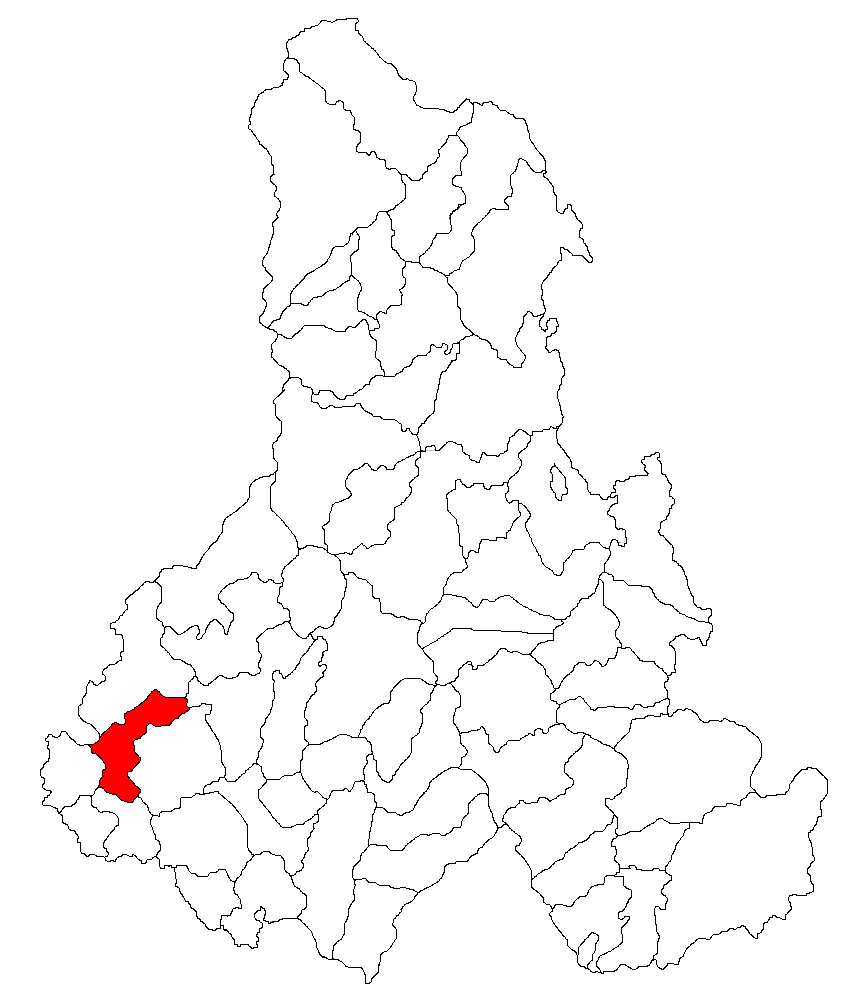
- Location in Harghita County

- Location in Romania
- Coordinates: 46°20′N 25°01′E
- Country: Romania
- County: Harghita

Government
  - Mayor (2020–2024): Dezső-Szabolcs Simó (UDMR)
- Area: 28.19 km^{2} (10.88 sq mi)
- Elevation: 421 m (1,381 ft)
- Population (2021-12-01): 2,324
  - Density: 82.44/km^{2} (213.5/sq mi)
- Time zone: UTC+02:00 (EET)
  - Summer (DST): UTC+03:00 (EEST)
- Postal code: 537010
- Area code: +(40) 266
- Vehicle reg.: HR
- Website: ghidulprimariilor.ro/businesses/primaria-avramesti/

Avrămești (Hungarian: Szentábrahám, Hungarian pronunciation: [ˈsɛntɒbrɒhaːm], meaning "St. Abraham") is a commune in Harghita County, Romania. It lies in the Székely Land, an ethno-cultural region in eastern Transylvania. The commune is composed of eight villages: Andreeni (Magyarandrásfalva), Avrămești, Cechești (Csekefalva), Firtănuș (Firtosmartonos), Goagiu (Gagy), Medișoru Mic (Kismedesér), Laz-Firtănuș (Firtosmartonosi Láz), and Laz-Șoimuș (Solymosi Láz).

== History ==
Before the 1876 administrative reform of Transylvania, the village formed part of the Székely seat of Udvarhelyszék, then becoming, until 1918, a part of Udvarhely County in the Kingdom of Hungary. In the aftermath of World War I, the Union of Transylvania with Romania was declared in December 1918. At the start of the Hungarian–Romanian War of 1918–1919, the town passed under Romanian administration. After the Treaty of Trianon of 1920, it became part of the Kingdom of Romania. During the interwar period, the town fell within plasa Cristur in Odorhei County. In 1940, the Second Vienna Award granted Northern Transylvania to Hungary and the locality was held by Hungary until 1944. After Soviet occupation, the Romanian administration returned and the town became officially part of Romania in March 1945. Between 1952 and 1960, Avrămești fell within the Magyar Autonomous Region, between 1960 and 1968 the Mureș-Magyar Autonomous Region. In 1968, the region was abolished, and since then, the commune has been part of Harghita County.

== Demographics ==
Historical population
Year	Pop.	±%
1850	2,404	—
1956	3,062	+27.4%
2002	2,517	−17.8%
2011	2,465	−2.1%
2021	2,324	−5.7%
Source: Census data

At the 2011 census, the commune had a population of 2,465; out of them, 2,105 (85.4%) were Hungarians, 278 (11.3%) were Roma, and 17 (0.7%) were Romanians. 65% of the commune population were Unitarian, 17% Reformed, 6% Roman Catholic, and 1% Orthodox. At the 2021 census, Avrămești had a population of 2,324, of which 87.01% were Hungarians and 3.44% Roma.
