= Șimonești =

Șimonești Siménfalva
- Commune
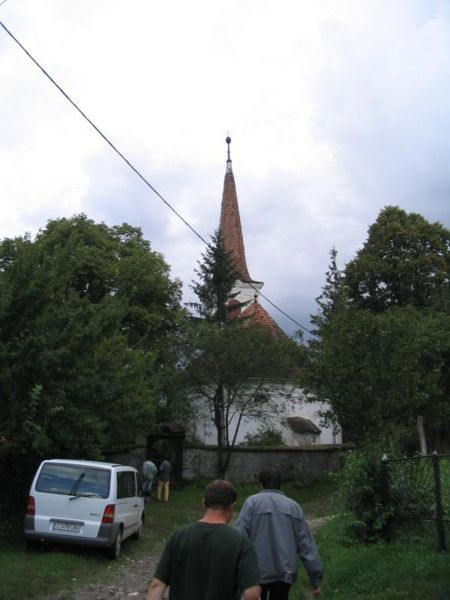
- Unitarian church

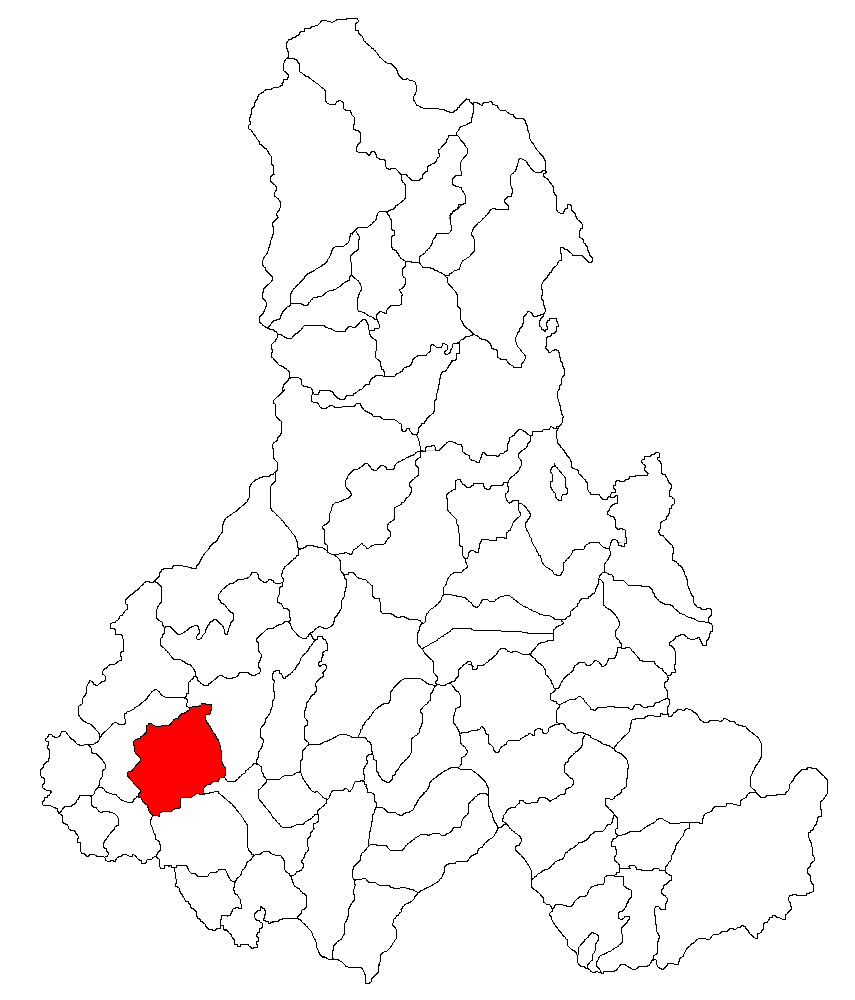
- Location in Harghita County

- Location in Romania
- Coordinates: 46°20′N 25°6′E
- Country: Romania
- County: Harghita

Government
  - Mayor (2020–2024): János Nagy (UDMR)
- Area: 118.45 km^{2} (45.73 sq mi)
- Population (2021-12-01): 3,416
  - Density: 28.84/km^{2} (74.69/sq mi)
- Time zone: UTC+02:00 (EET)
  - Summer (DST): UTC+03:00 (EEST)
- Postal code: 537310
- Area code: +40 266
- Vehicle reg.: HR
- Website: www.simenfalva.ro/

Șimonești (Hungarian: Siménfalva, Hungarian pronunciation: [ˈʃimeːnfɒlvɒ]) is a commune in Harghita County, Romania. It lies in the Székely Land, an ethno-cultural region in eastern Transylvania.

== Component villages ==
The commune is composed of fourteen villages:

In Romanian	In Hungarian
Bențid	Bencéd
Cădaciu Mare	Nagykadács
Cădaciu Mic	Kiskadács
Cehețel	Csehétfalva
Chedia Mare	Nagykede
Chedia Mică	Kiskede
Cobătești	Kobátfalva
Medișoru Mare	Medesér
Mihăileni	Székelyszentmihály
Nicoleni	Székelyszentmiklós
Rugănești	Rugonfalva
Șimonești	Siménfalva
Tărcești	Tarcsafalva
Turdeni	Tordátfalva

== History ==
The villages were historically part of the Székely Land area of Transylvania. Mózes Székely, prince of Transylvania, had the center of his estates here. The villages belonged to Udvarhelyszék district until the administrative reform of Transylvania in 1876, when they fell within Udvarhely County in the Kingdom of Hungary. After the Treaty of Trianon of 1920, they became part of Romania and fell within Odorhei County during the interwar period. In 1940, the second Vienna Award granted the Northern Transylvania to Hungary and they were held by Hungary until 1944. After Soviet occupation, the Romanian administration returned and the villages became officially part of Romania in 1947. Between 1952 and 1960, the commune fell within the Magyar Autonomous Region, between 1960 and 1968 the Mureș-Magyar Autonomous Region. In 1968, the province was abolished, and since then, the commune has been part of Harghita County.

=== Nicoleni ===
The village, populated by Unitarian Hungarians, was first mentioned in a tithe list from 1332. In terms of religious affiliations, it belonged to the Unitarian part of Udvarhelyszék. The original church was destroyed at the beginning of the 19th century, and the new church was built in a different place in the centre of the village.

=== Rugănești ===
Rugănești is a Székely village, next to Cristuru Secuiesc on the Nyikó creek. It is populated by Hungarian Calvinists and Unitarians. It has a Gothic Calvinist Church with a few remaining Gothic murals painted before the Reformation which were uncovered in the 20th century.

== Demographics ==
The commune has an absolute Székely (Hungarian) majority. According to the 2002 census it has a population of 3,738 of which 99.11% or 3,705 are Hungarians.

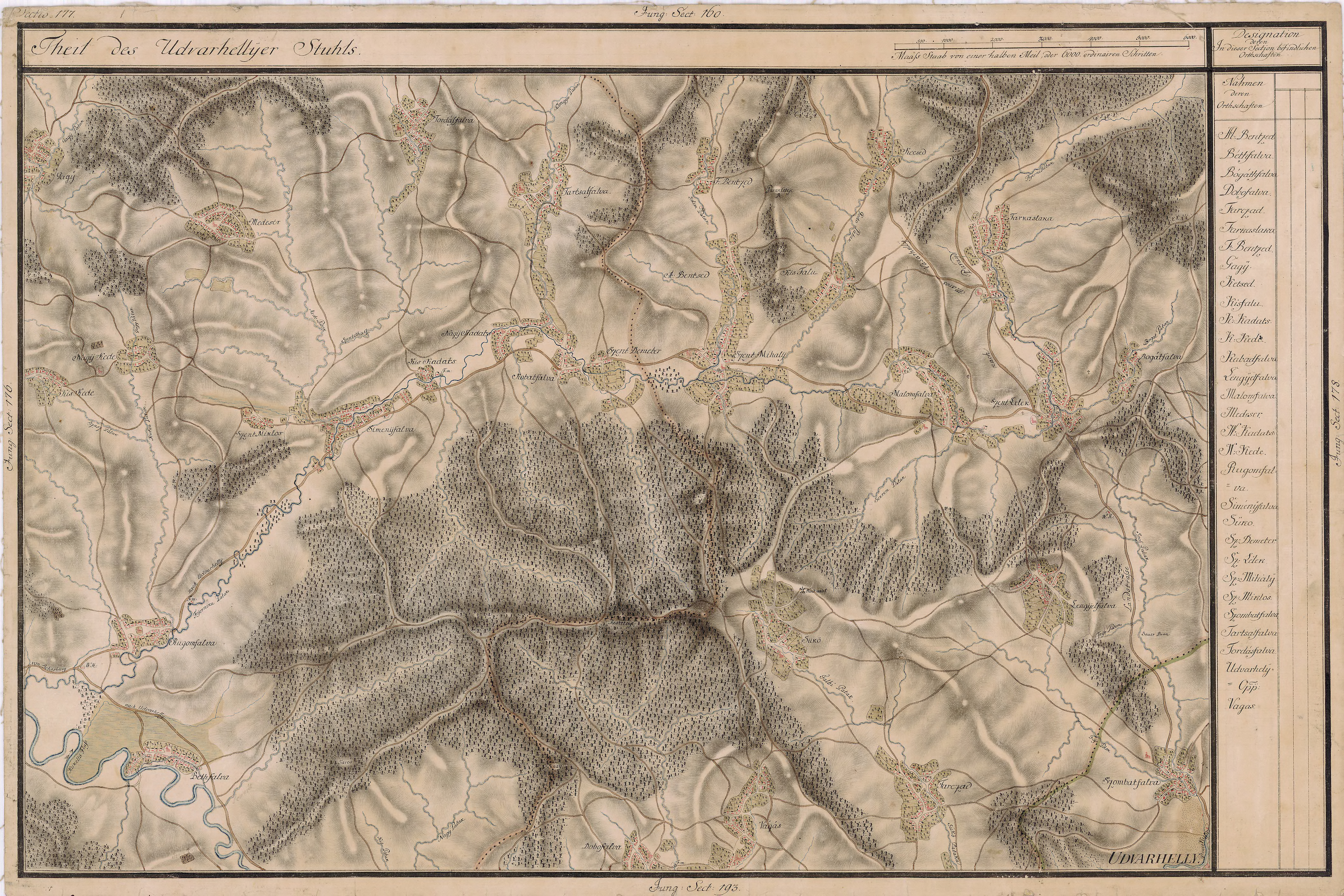
The villages on the 18th century Josephinische Landaufnahme

== Image gallery ==
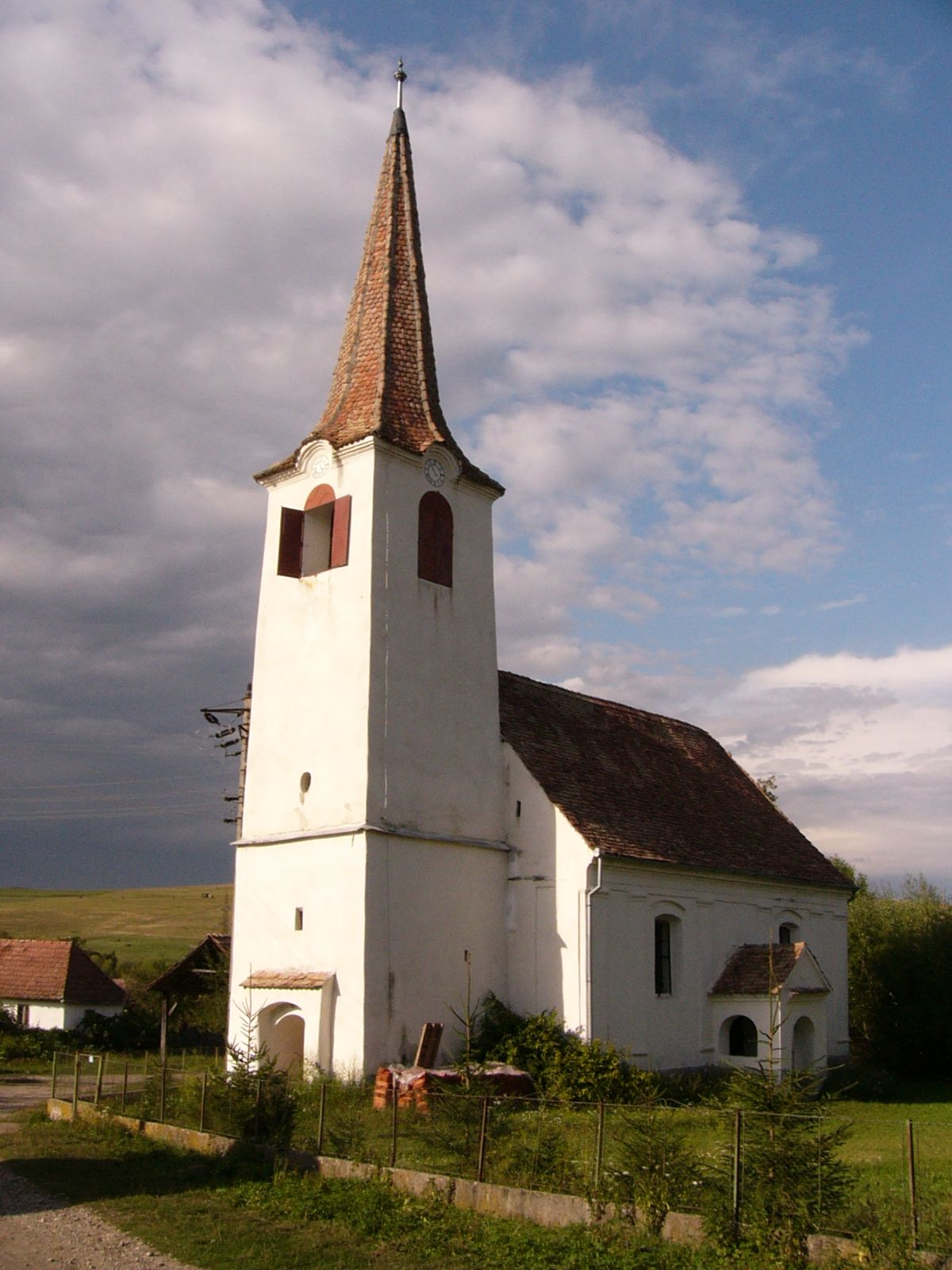
Unitarian church (Nicoleni)

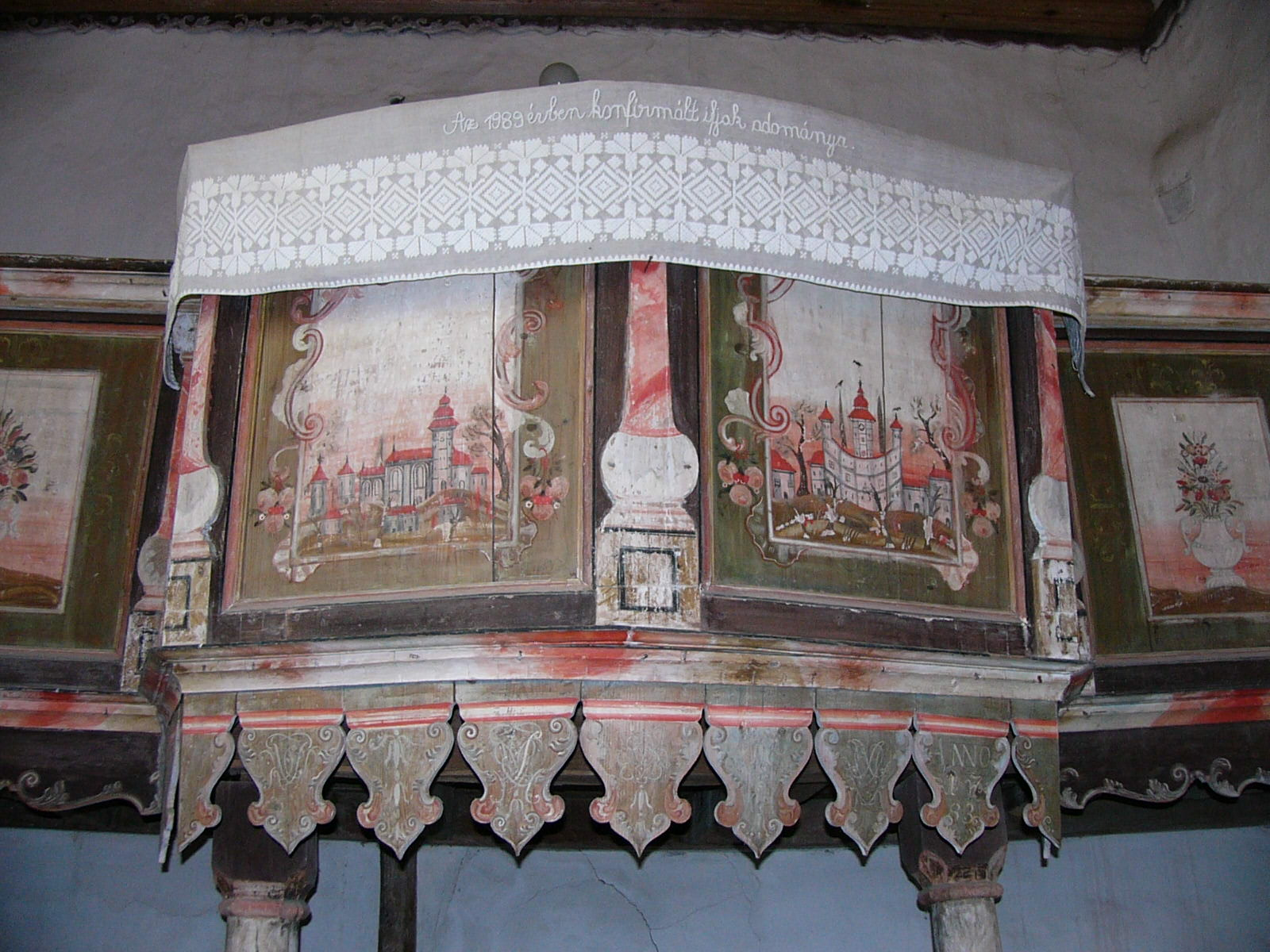
Reformed church Interior (Rugănești)

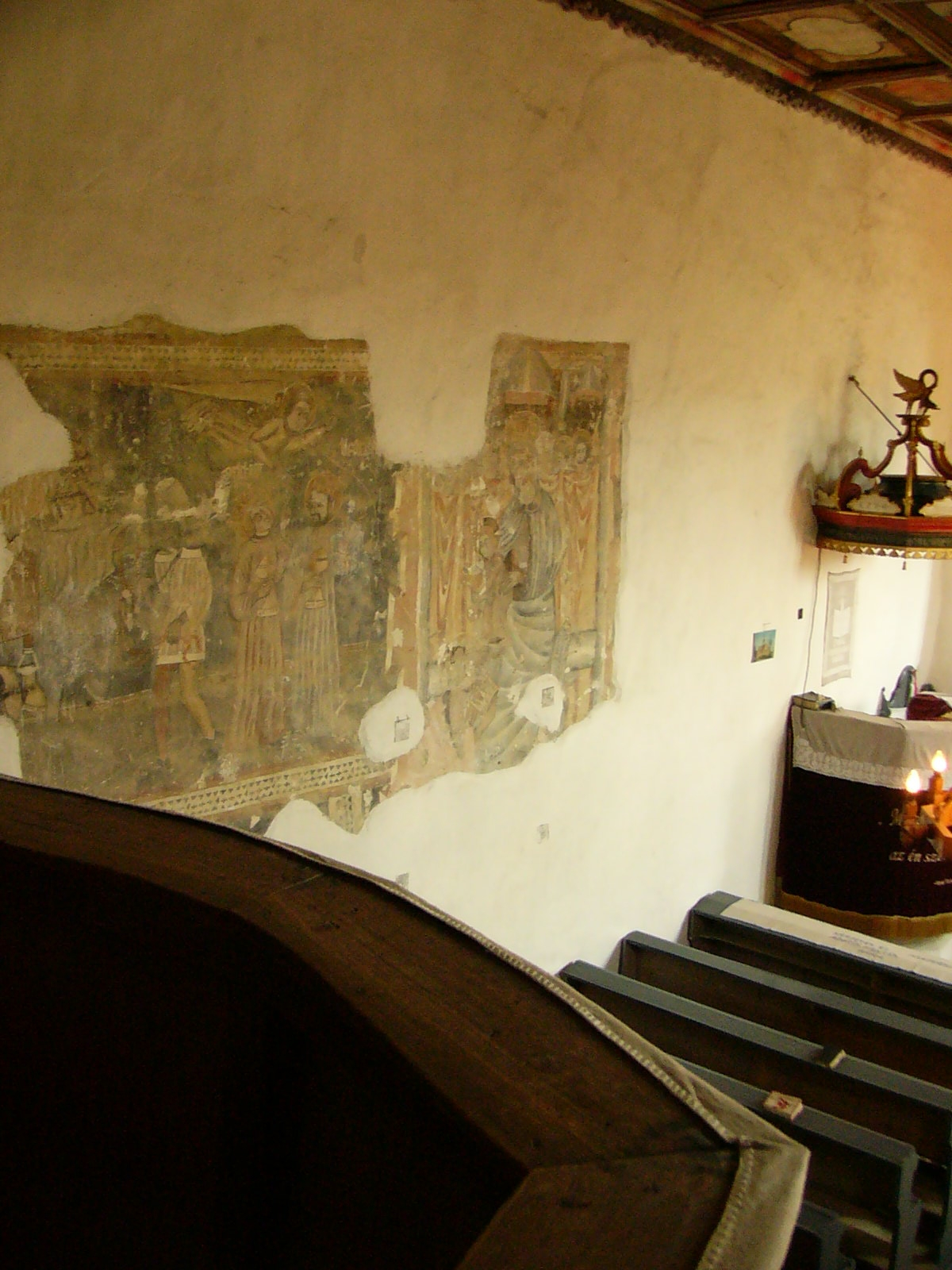
Reformed church mural

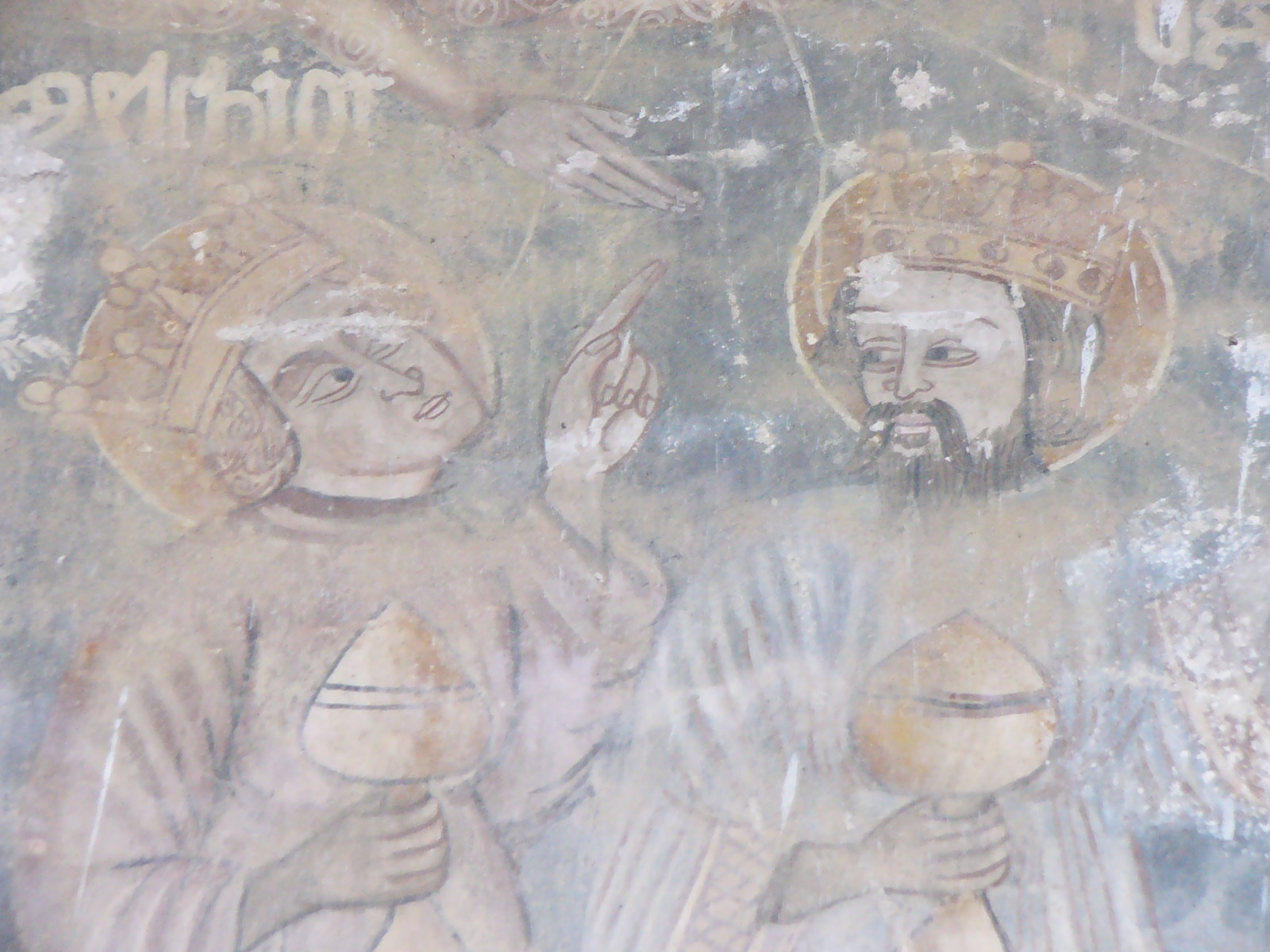
Reformed church mural

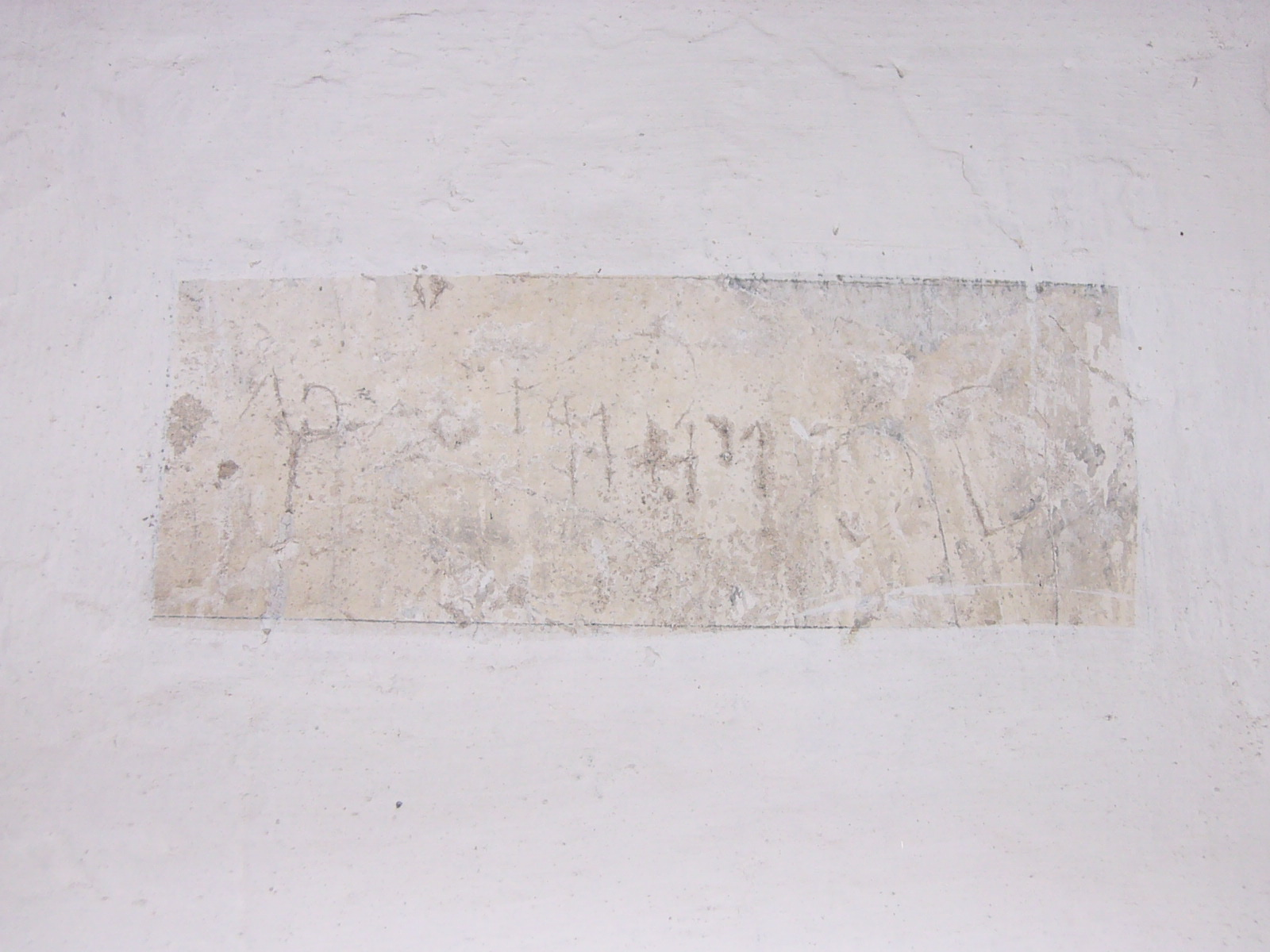
Hungarian runes
