= Cristuru Secuiesc =

Cristuru Secuiesc Székelykeresztúr
- Town
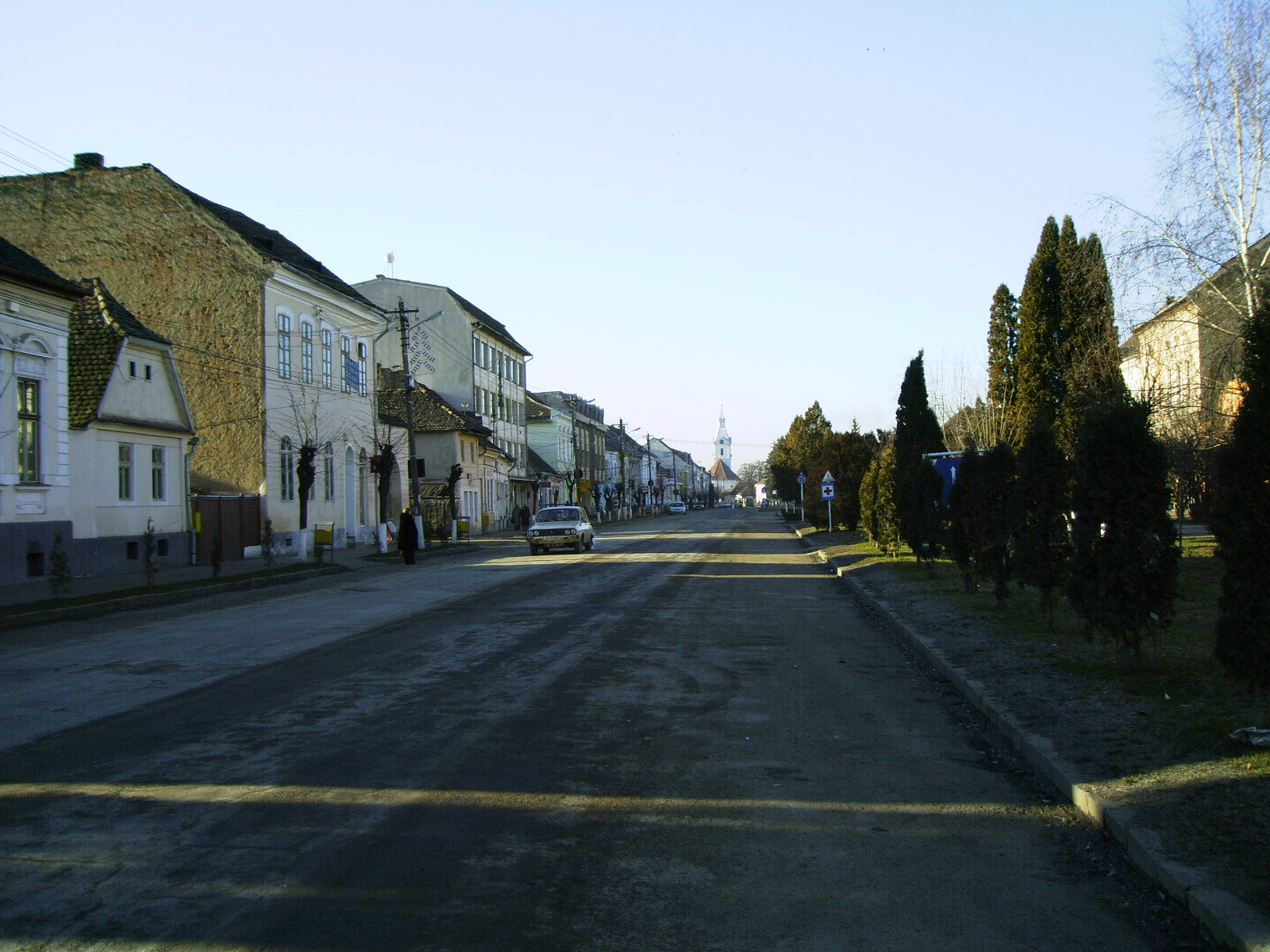

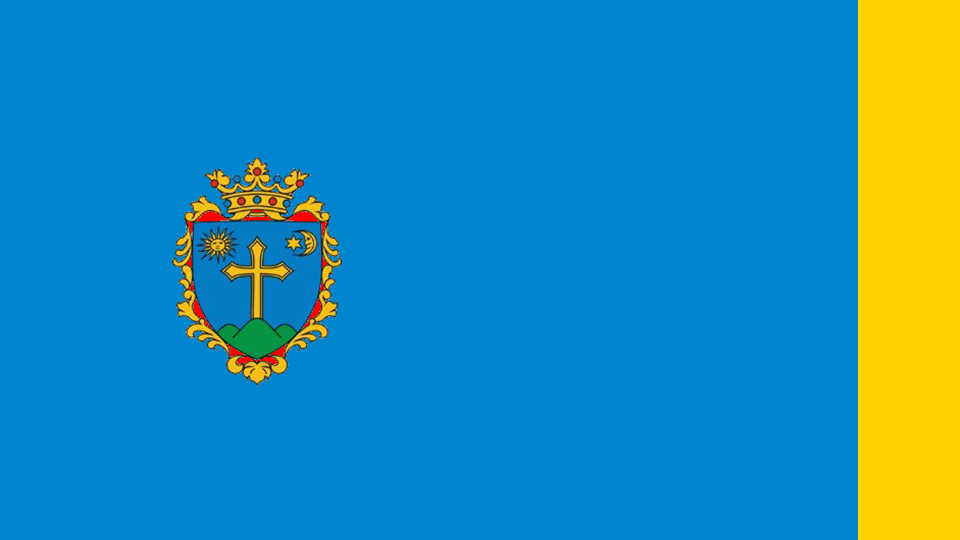
- Flag Coat of arms

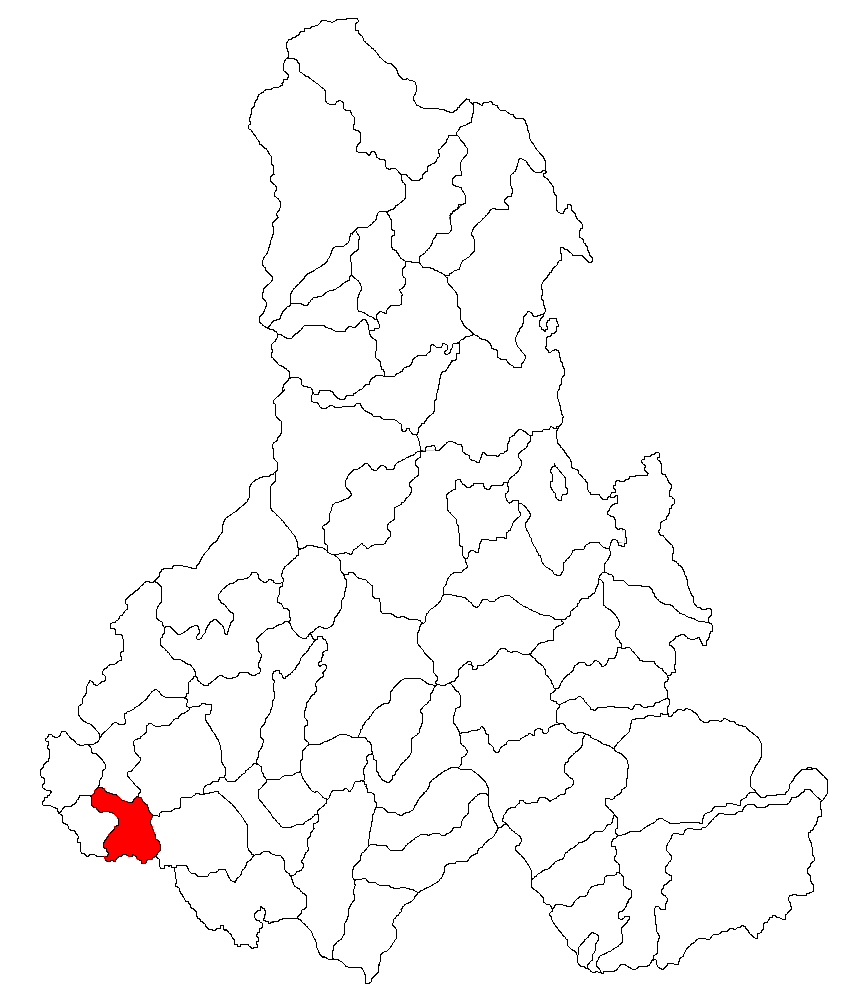
- Location in Harghita County

- Location in Romania
- Coordinates: 46°17′30″N 25°2′7″E
- Country: Romania
- County: Harghita

Government
  - Mayor (2024–2028): Hunor-János Koncz (AMT)
- Area: 53.95 km^{2} (20.83 sq mi)
- Elevation: 393 m (1,289 ft)
- Population (2021-12-01): 8,797
  - Density: 163.1/km^{2} (422.3/sq mi)
- Time zone: UTC+02:00 (EET)
  - Summer (DST): UTC+03:00 (EEST)
- Postal code: 535400
- Area code: (+40) 02 66
- Vehicle reg.: HR
- Website: www.keresztur.ro

Cristuru Secuiesc (Romanian pronunciation: [ˌkristuru sekuˈjesk]; Hungarian: Székelykeresztúr, pronounced [ˈseːkɛjkɛrɛstuːr]; German: Szeklerkreuz) is a town in Harghita County, Romania. It lies in the Székely Land, an ethno-cultural region in eastern Transylvania. The town administers two villages: Betești (Betfalva), part of Mugeni until 2004, and Filiaș (Fiatfalva).

== Location ==
Cristuru Secuiesc lies on the Transylvanian Plateau, in the area where the river Goagiu flows into the Târnava Mare. It is located in the southwestern part of the county, on the border with Mureș County. The town is crossed by national road DN13C; Odorheiu Secuiesc is 26 km (16 mi) to the east, while the county seat, Miercurea Ciuc, is 78 km (48 mi) in that direction.

== History ==
The town was part of the Székely Land area of the historical Transylvania province. It belonged to Udvarhelyszék until the administrative reform of Transylvania in 1876, when it fell within the Udvarhely County of the Kingdom of Hungary. In the aftermath of World War I and the Hungarian–Romanian War of 1918–1919, it passed under Romanian administration; after the Treaty of Trianon of 1920, like the rest of Transylvania, it became part of the Kingdom of Romania. During the interwar period, the town fell within Odorhei County. From 1933 to 1940, the town was renamed after I. G. Duca, the Prime Minister of Romania who was assassinated in December 1933 for his efforts to suppress the fascist Iron Guard movement.

In 1940, the Second Vienna Award granted Northern Transylvania to Hungary and the town was held by Hungary until 1944. After Soviet occupation, the Romanian administration returned and the town became officially part of Romania in March 1945. Between 1952 and 1960, Cristuru Secuiesc fell within the Magyar Autonomous Region, between 1960 and 1968 the Mureș-Magyar Autonomous Region. In 1968, the region was abolished, and since then, the town has been part of Harghita County.

== Demographics ==
Historical population
Year	Pop.	±%
1956	5,194	—
1966	5,942	+14.4%
1977	7,197	+21.1%
1992	10,611	+47.4%
2002	11,291	+6.4%
2011	9,491	−15.9%
2021	8,797	−7.3%
Source: Census data

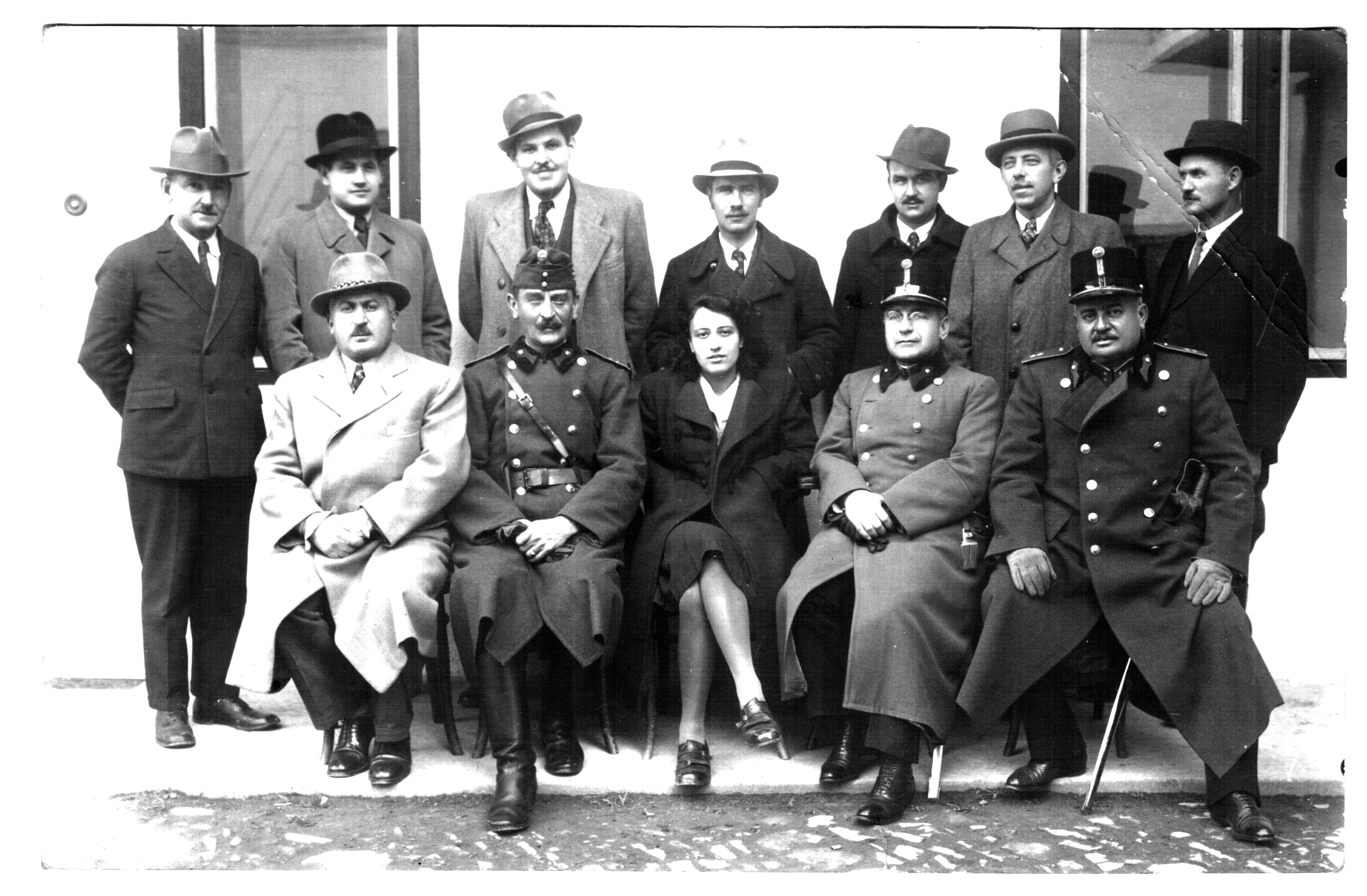
Hometown folks at the end of the 1930s

As of the Romanian census of 2002, the town had a population of 9,672, of whom 9,201 (95.13%) were ethnic Hungarians, 2.47 ethnic Roma, 2.27% ethnic Romanians, and 0.12% others. At the 2011 census, there were 9,491 inhabitants. At the 2021 census, Cristuru Secuiesc had a population of 8,797.

Demographic movements according to census data:

In terms of religion, 46.02% of its inhabitants are Reformed, 35.99% are Unitarian, 14.27% are Roman Catholic, 2.33% are Romanian Orthodox.

== Natives ==
- Ajtony Árpád (1944 – 2013), writer
- Alexandru Gergely (1951 – 2018), footballer and manager
- Csaba Györffy (1943 – 2018), footballer and manager

== Sights ==
The Unitarian Gimnazium (secondary school) was established in the 18th century. The Catholic church has medieval murals.

== International relations ==
=== Twin towns – Sister cities ===
Cristuru Secuiesc is twinned with:

- Ajka, Hungary (1992)
- Csurgó, Hungary
- Derecske, Hungary
- Dévaványa, Hungary (1994)
- Dunakeszi, Hungary
- Kalocsa, Hungary
- Karcag, Hungary (1990)
- Kúnszentmiklós, Hungary
- Lánycsók, Hungary
- Moldava nad Bodvou, Slovakia
- Pesterzsébet – 20th district of Budapest, Hungary
- Senta, Serbia

== Gallery ==
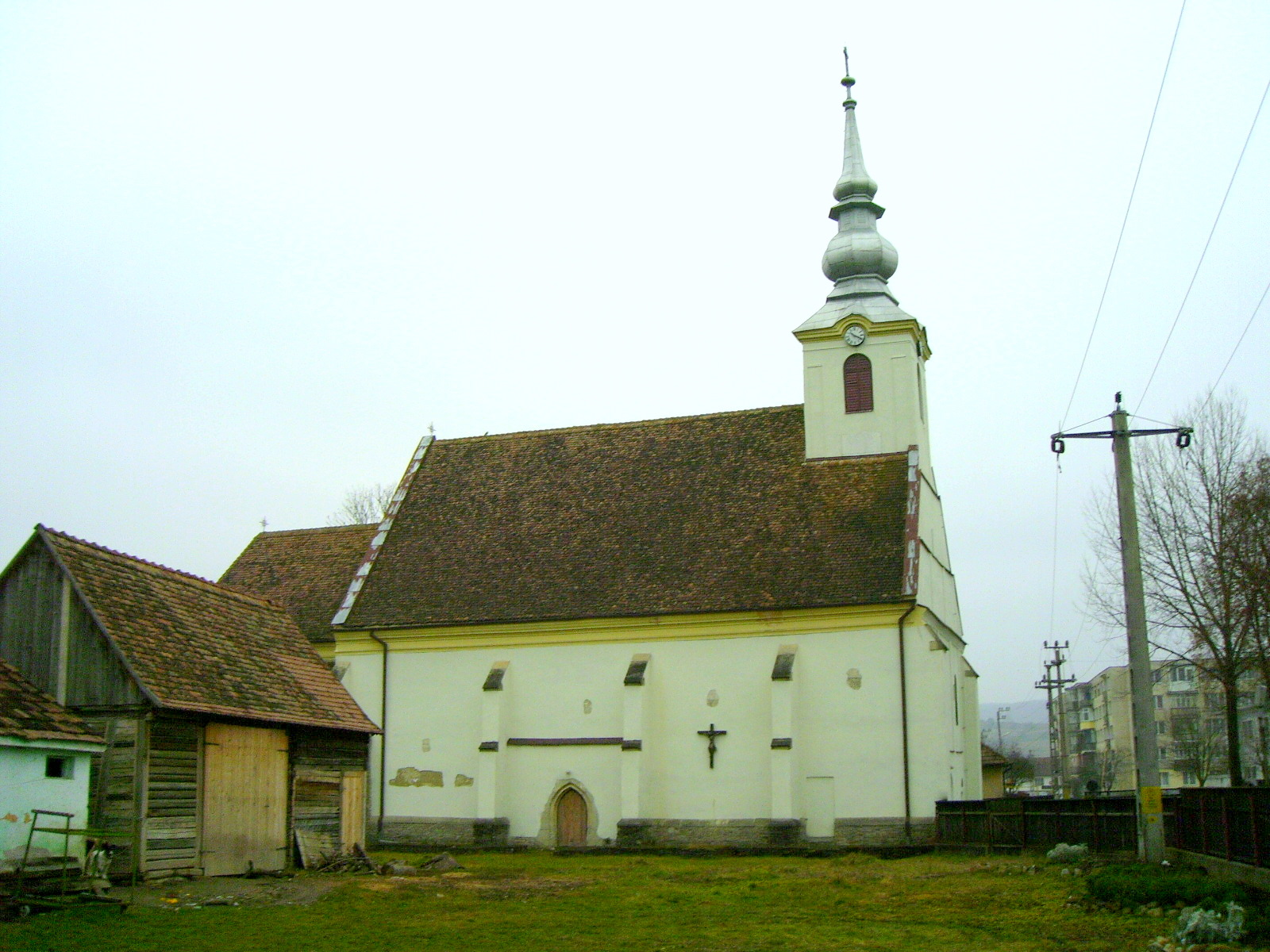
Catholic parish church

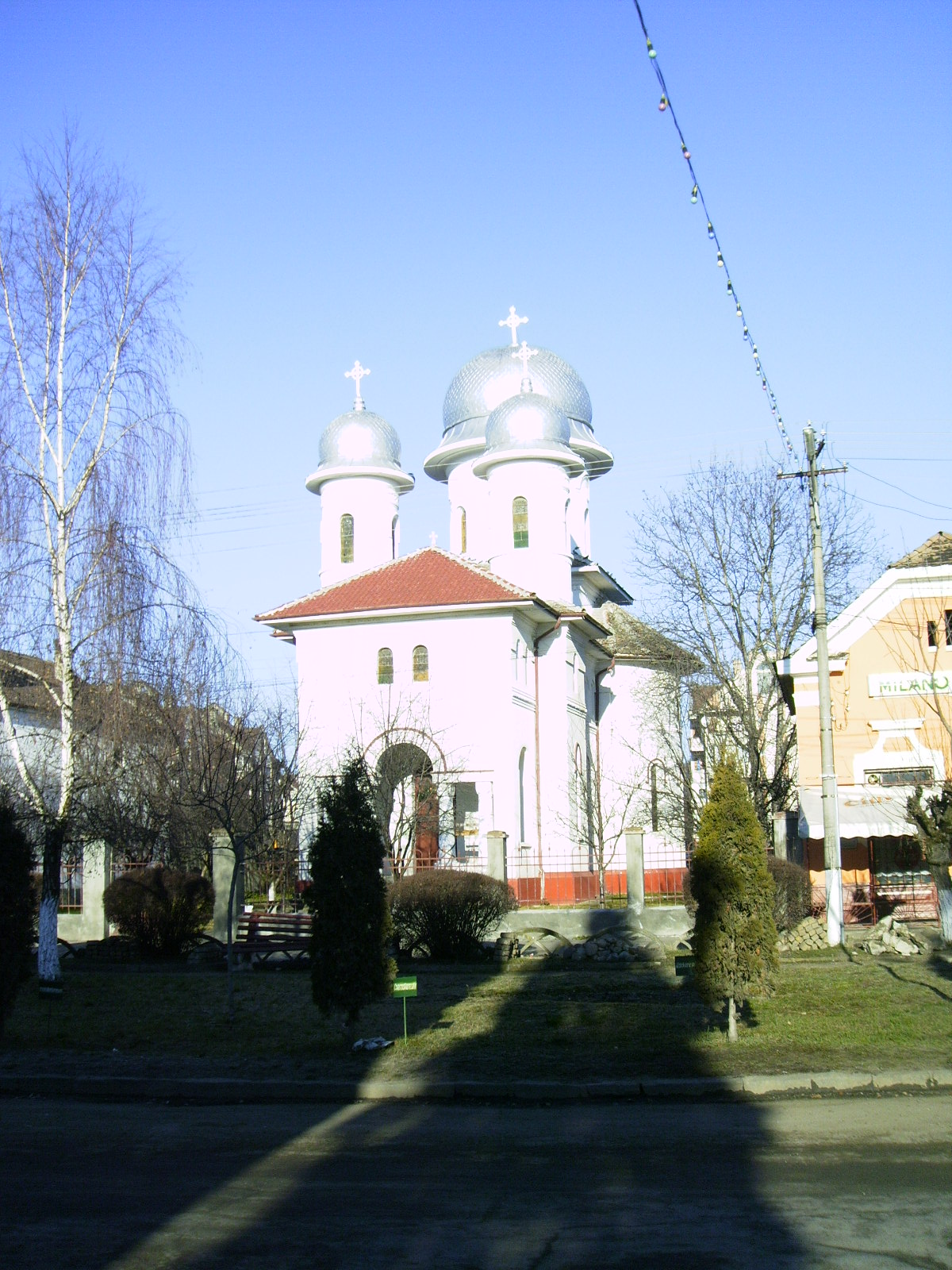
Romanian Orthodox church

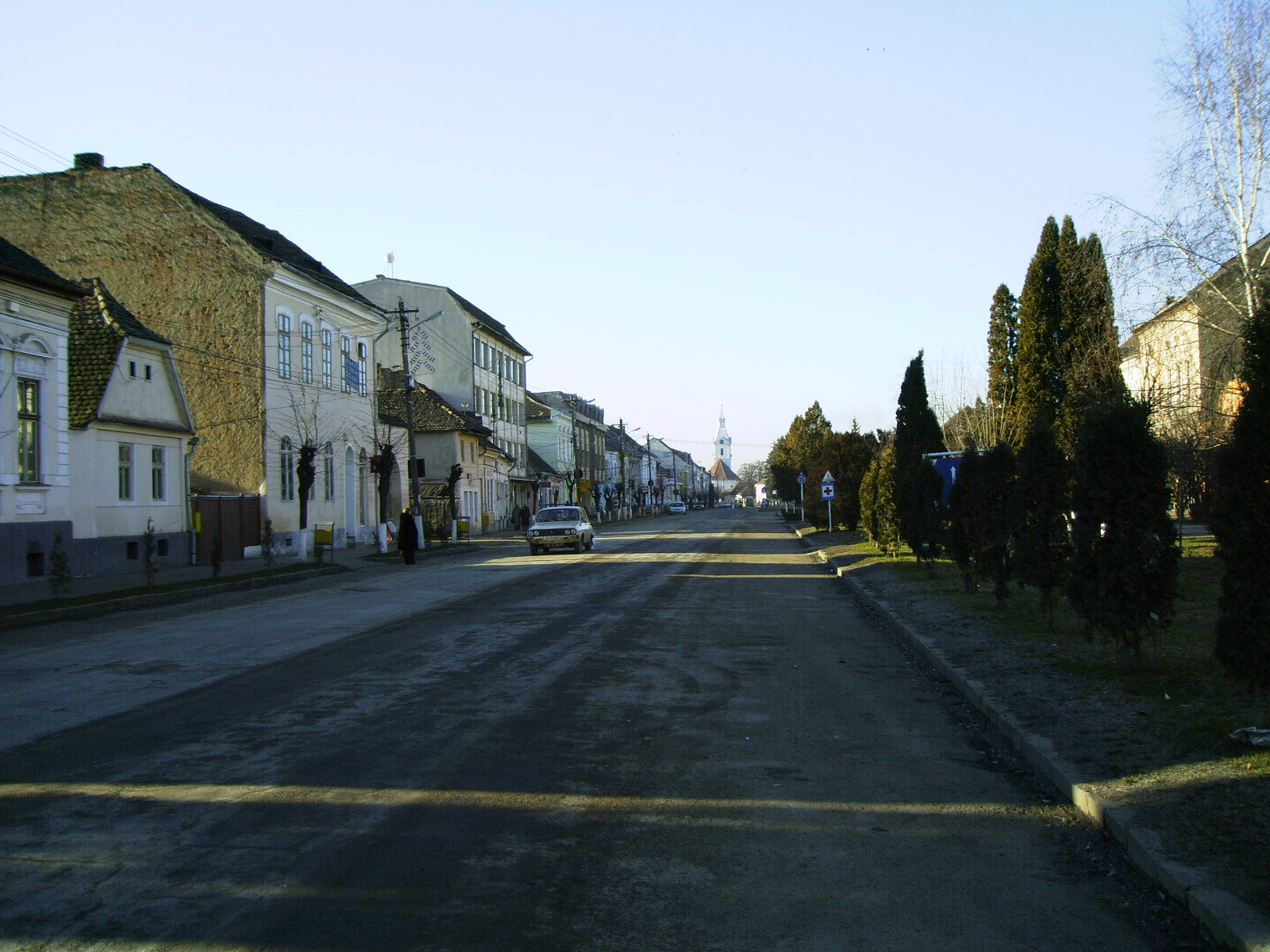
Liberty Square

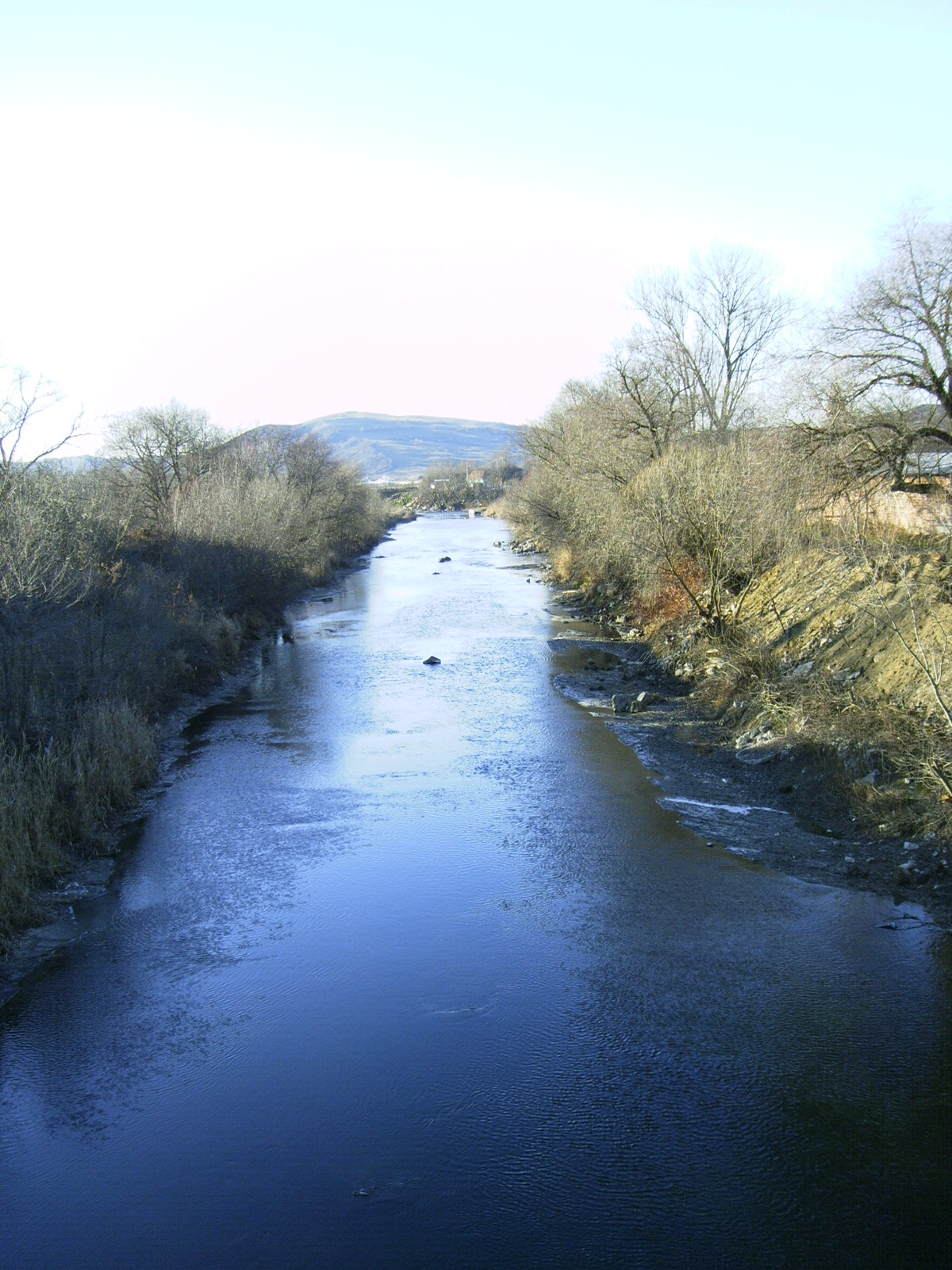
Târnava Mare River bank
