= Biro (surname) =

Bíró is a Hungarian surname meaning "judge". Notable people with the name include:

- Andrew Biro (born 1969), Canadian academic
- Anton Biró (born 1939), Romanian hockey player
- Barnabás Bíró (born 2005), Hungarian footballer
- Borbala Biro (born 1957), Hungarian biologist and agricultural scientist
- Boubacar Biro Diallo (1922–2025), Guinean politician
- Brandon Biro (born 1998), Canadian hockey player
- Charles Biro (1911–1972), American comic book writer
- Daniel Biro (born 1963), English musician and composer
- Dora Biro, American researcher
- Guilherme Biro, multiple people
- Gyula Bíró (1890–1961), Hungarian Olympic footballer
- István Biró (born 1951), Serbian politician
- Katalin Bíró-Sey (1934–2022), Hungarian numismatist
- László Bíró (1899–1985), Hungarian-Argentine inventor; invented the ballpoint pen
- Lajos Bíró (1880–1948), Hungarian novelist, playwright, and screenwriter
- Melinda Bíró (born 2007), Hungarian tennis player
- Norbert Bíró (born 1974), Hungarian Paralympic judoka
- Péter Bíró, multiple people
- Peter Paul Biro (1954–2024), Canadian art analyst
- Sámuel Bíró de Homoródszentmárton (1665–1721), Transylvanian politician
- Sari Biro (1912–1990), Hungarian pianist
- Štefan Biró (1913–1954), Slovak footballer
- Szabolcs Bíró (born 1969), Hungarian footballer
- Val Biro (1921–2014), children's writer and artist
- Ferenc Puskás (1927–2006), Hungarian footballer (known as Ferenc Puskás Biró on Spanish documents)
