= List of Unitarian bishops =

This is a list of Unitarian bishops. Traditionally Unitarians of Magyar origins since their inception with Bishop Ferenc Dávid maintain an episcopal polity.

== Bishoprics ==
- Bishopric of Cluj
- Bishopric of Budapest
- Unitarian bishopric of Scandinavia

== Bishops ==
- Ferenc Dávid 1568–1579
- Demeter Hunyadi 1579–1592
- Enyedi György 1592–1597
- Kósa János 1597–1601
- Máté Toroczkai 1601–1616
- Radeczki Bálint 1616–1632
- Csanádi Pál 1632–1636
- Beke Dániel 1636–1661
- Járai János 1661. April 7.– June 3.
- The office of bishop remained vacant for two years, as it was not possible to hold a synod to elect a bishop due to the war.
- Koncz Boldizsár 1663–1684
- Szentiványi Márkos Dániel 1684-1689
- Bedő Pál 1689–1690
- Nagy Mihály 1691–1692
- Almási Gergely Mihály 1692–1724
- Pálfi Zsigmond 1724–1737
- Mihály Lombard de Szentábrahám 1737–1758
- István Agh 1758–1786
- Lázár István 1786–1811
- Körmöczi János 1812–1836
- Székely Miklós 1838–1843
- Aranyosrákosi Székely Sándor 1845–1852
- For nine years, the office of bishop remained vacant, as the government did not recognize the church's right to elect a bishop. During this period, the episcopal duties were performed by Mózes Székely, the chief ecclesiastical secretary.
- Kriza János 1861–1875
- Ferencz József 1876–1928
- Boros György 1928–1938
- Varga Béla 1938–1941
- Józan Miklós 1941–1946
- Kiss Elek 1946–1971
- Kovács Lajos 1972–1994
- Erdő János 1994–1996
- Szabó Árpád 1996–2009
- Bálint Benczédi Ferenc 2009–
- Emilsen Ragnar
