= István Ágh =

István Ágh may refer to:

- István Agh (1709–1786), Hungarian Unitarian bishop
- István Ágh (poet) (1938–2025), Hungarian poet
- István Ágh (sport shooter) (born 1970), Hungarian sport shooter
