= Biro (disambiguation) =

Biro is British English slang for a ballpoint pen.

Biro could also refer to:

- Biro (surname)
- Biro language, spoken in Nigeria
- 327512 Bíró, a minor planet
