= Lőrincz =

Lőrincz is a Hungarian surname. Notable people with the surname include:

- Ferenc Lőrincz (ice hockey), Hungarian Olympic hockey player
- Tamás Lőrincz (1986) Hungarian wrestler, silver medal at the 2012 Summer Olympics
- Márton Lőrincz (1911-1969) Hungarian wrestler and Olympic champion
- László L. Lőrincz (1939) Hungarian orientalist and as Leslie L. Lawrence science fiction author
- Matthew Lorincz (1968) Canadian scientist
- Dénes Lőrincz and Géza Lőrincz, ethnic Hungarian editors of the Unitárius Hírnök Hungarian Unitarian newspaper in Romania
- Allan Levente Lorincz, M.D. (1924-2010), international master of investigative dermatology, teacher, scholar, & chairman of dermatology at the University of Chicago (1961-1991)
- Lőrinc Mészáros (1966) Hungarian businessman and oligarch
- Susan Lorincz (1965) American convicted murderer for the Killing of Ajike Owens
