= Cluj-Napoca Unitarian Church =

Church in Romania

Coordinates: 46.7718757°N 23.5922458°E

Unitarian Church of Cluj
- Kolozsvári Unitárius Templom (Hungarian); Biserica Unitariană din Cluj (Romanian)
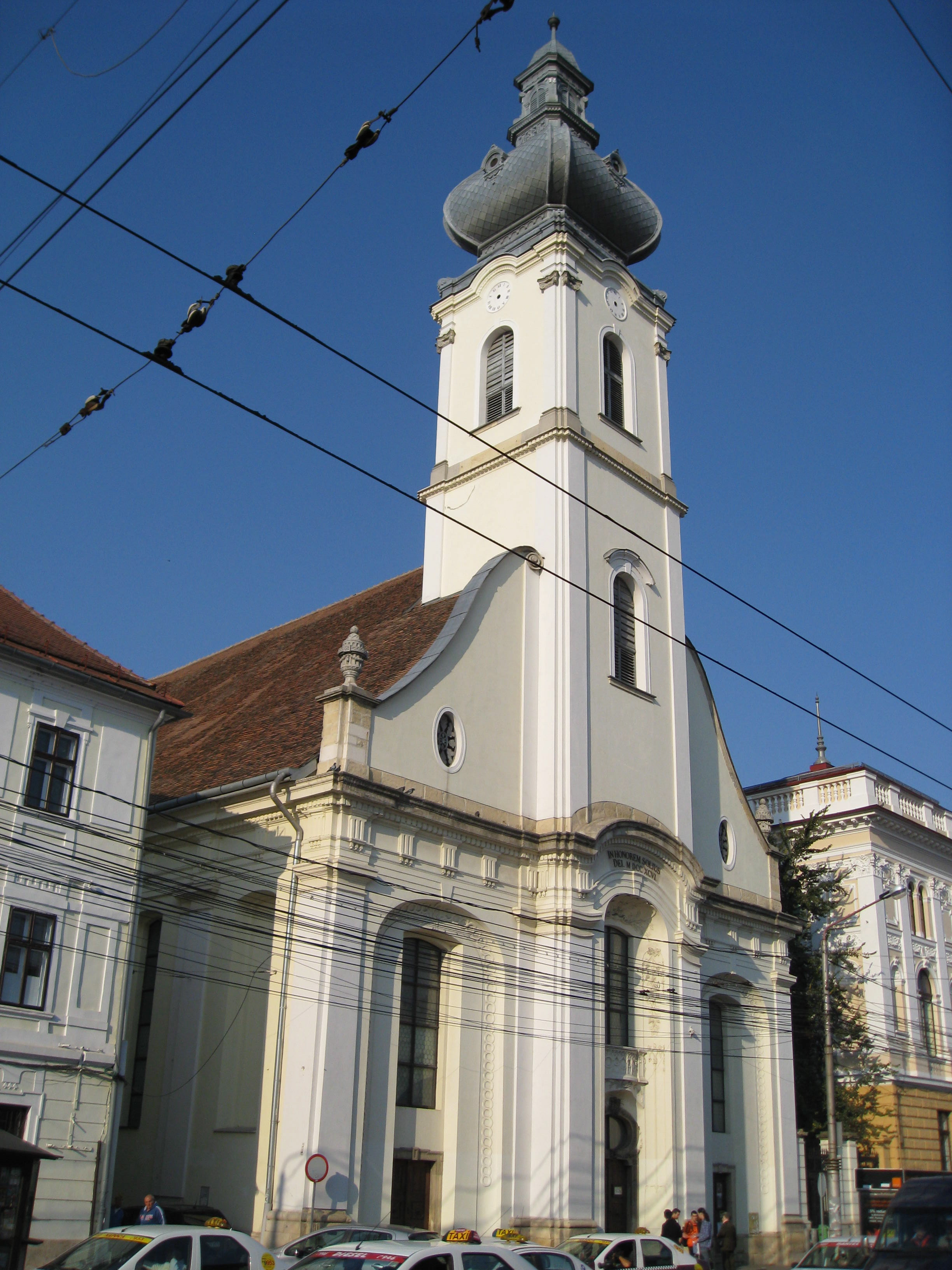
- Unitarian Church of Cluj
- Location: 21st December 1989 Boulevard nr. 9, Cluj-Napoca
- Country: Romania
- Denomination: Unitarian

History
- Consecrated: 14 December 1796

Architecture
- Architect: Türk Antal
- Style: Baroque
- Groundbreaking: 1792
- Completed: 1796

Clergy
- Pastor: Norbert Rácz

The Cluj-Napoca Unitarian Church (Romanian: Biserica Unitariană din Cluj; Hungarian: Kolozsvári Unitárius Templom) is a Unitarian church located in Cluj-Napoca, Romania.

Built in a late Baroque style between 1792 and 1796, according to the plans of Anton (Antal) Türk, the apse is semicircular and the vestibule faces south. A two-story spire with an onion-shaped roof dominates the facade. The upper parts of the facade are somber compared to the lower, which features tall niches between the pilasters. The central niche contains the portal, topped by an ellipse-shaped window, a small and amply sculpted balcony and another window in the shape of an arch segment. The pilasters have Doric and Ionic capitals, while the Neoclassical stucco decor includes sculpted shells, garlands and grape bunches. The church is listed as a historic monument by Romania's Ministry of Culture and Religious Affairs.
