= Who the $&% Is Jackson Pollock? =

Who the #$&% Is Jackson Pollock?
- Promotional movie poster for the film
- Directed by: Harry Moses
- Produced by: Don Hewitt; Steven Hewitt; Michael Lynne
- Starring: Teri Horton
- Distributed by: Picturehouse
- Release date: November 9, 2006
- Language: English

Who the #$&% Is Jackson Pollock? is a 2006 documentary following Teri Horton, a 73-year-old former long-haul truck driver from California, who purchased a painting from a thrift shop for $5, only to find out later that it may be a Jackson Pollock painting. She had no clue at the time who Jackson Pollock was, hence the name of the film.

== Background ==
Horton said she purchased the painting from a California thrift shop as a gift for a friend who was feeling depressed. Horton thought the bright colors were cheery, but when the dinner-table-sized painting proved too large to fit into her friend's trailer, Horton set it out among other items at a yard sale, where a local art teacher spotted it and suggested that the work could have been painted by Pollock due to the similarity to his action painting technique. At one point Horton and her friend considered using the painting for target practice. The film depicts Horton's attempts to authenticate and sell the painting as an original work by Pollock. Its authenticity was doubtful, because the painting was purchased at a thrift store, is unsigned, and is without provenance. The main problem with the painting is that it "does not have the soul of a Pollock", according to some collectors. Additionally, Pollock had many imitators during his lifetime. On another level, the film explores social class in the United States and the challenges faced by an outsider who takes on the high-stakes world of art dealership.

Some art connoisseurs, including Thomas Hoving, former director of the Metropolitan Museum of Art in New York, believe the painting to be inauthentic, while Nicolas Carone, an artist and friend of Pollock's, is uncertain. Horton hired Peter Paul Biro, a Montreal-based forensic art expert, who matched a partial fingerprint on the canvas to a fingerprint on a can of paint in Pollock's studio, as well as to fingerprints on two authenticated Pollock canvases. Additionally, through an analysis of paint samples from Pollock's studio, he was able to confirm a match with particles of paint found on the canvas in question, in what he calls a "3-point-match". However, in a June 2008 article in ARTnews, Sylvia Hochfield cited two forensic experts who called into question Biro's fingerprint analysis; similar concerns were raised in July 2010 by David Grann in an article for The New Yorker. In a pivotal point in the film, Horton's painting is compared side by side with Pollock's No. 5, 1948, a drip painting once owned by Samuel Irving Newhouse, Jr., CEO of Advance Publications. Horton approached Tod Volpe, a former high-profile dealer, after reading his memoir Framed to solicit his help in selling her painting. With Volpe's vision, a business venture was formed, Legends Art Group, to manage and sell works of art authenticated by science; the formation of this venture is discussed in the documentary.

== Production ==
Volpe also brought Horton's story to producer Steven Hewitt, who, along with his father, executive producer Don Hewitt (creator of 60 Minutes), had formed the Hewitt Group to produce documentaries. Harry Moses, an Emmy, Peabody, and Directors Guild of America award-winner, and a recipient of a lifetime achievement award from the National Academy of Television Arts and Sciences, is the film's other producer, as well as its director and writer.

== Other information ==
Horton, who appeared on The Montel Williams Show, The Tonight Show with Jay Leno, and the Late Show with David Letterman with the painting, turned down an offer Volpe secured for her of US$ 9 million from a Saudi Arabian buyer, and says she will take no less than $50 million for the painting. Horton died in 2019 without having sold the painting.

== Reception ==
On review aggregator website Rotten Tomatoes, the film holds an approval rating of 100% based on 15 reviews, with an average rating of 7.0/10.
