= La Bella Principessa =

Portrait attributed to Leonardo da Vinci

- The Beautiful Princess (English)
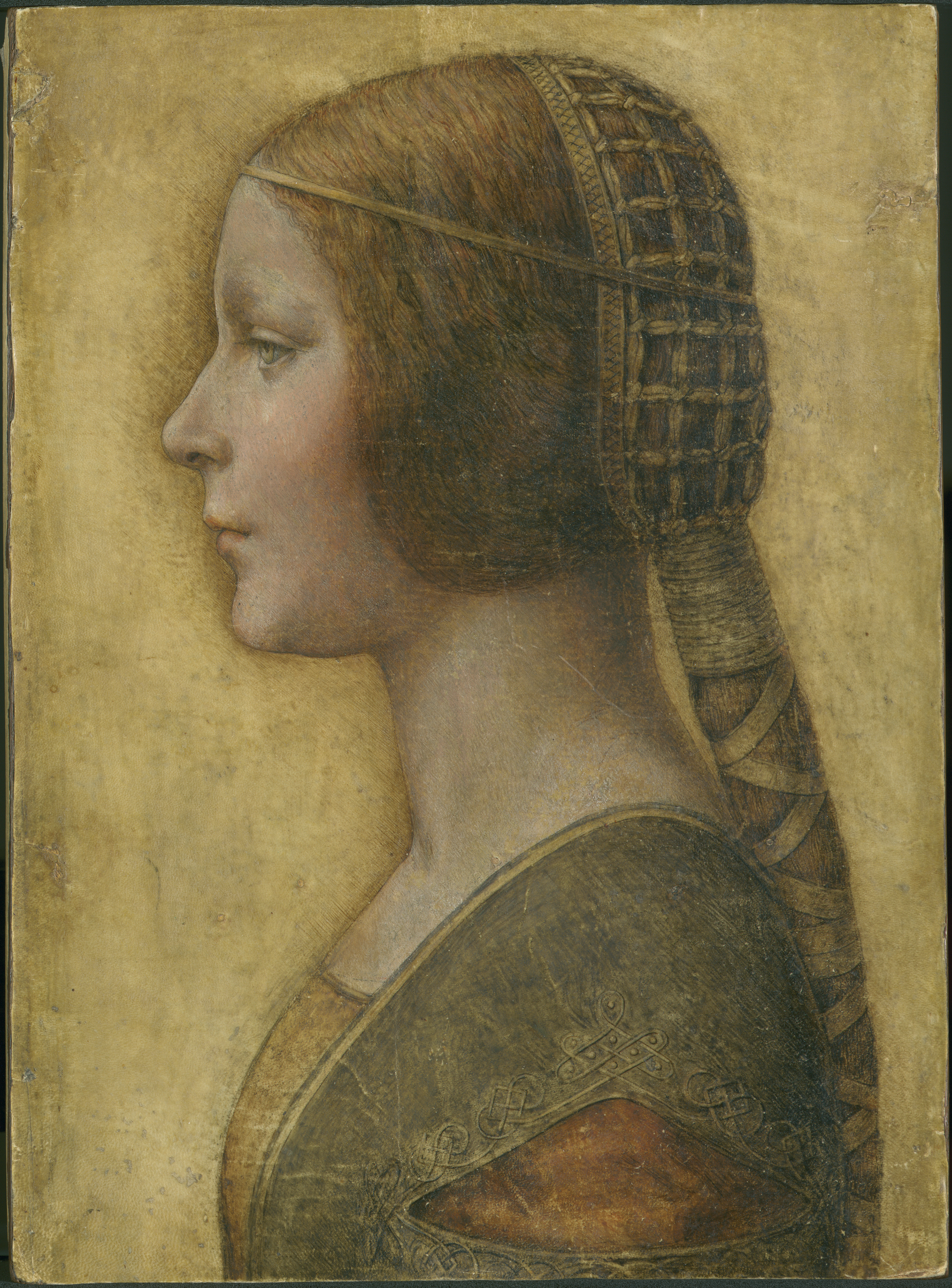
- Artist: Uncertain. Disputed attribution to Leonardo da Vinci
- Year: 1495-6 (Note: The vellum has been carbon dated to between 1440 – 1650, within a 95 % confidence interval. The 1495–96 is the dating by Kemp.)
- Type: Trois crayons (black, red and white chalk), heightened with pen and ink on vellum, laid on oak panel
- Subject: Bianca Sforza (Note: If by Leonardo; see text.)
- Dimensions: 33 cm × 23.9 cm (13 in × 9.4 in)
- Condition: Restored
- Owner: Private collection

La Bella Principessa (English: "The Beautiful Princess"), also known as Portrait of Bianca Sforza, Young Girl in Profile in Renaissance Dress and Portrait of a Young Fiancée, is a portrait in coloured chalks and ink, on vellum, of a young lady in fashionable costume and hairstyle of a Milanese of the 1490s. Some scholars have attributed it to Leonardo da Vinci but the attribution and the work's authenticity have been disputed. Supporters of the theory that it was by Leonardo have proposed that Bianca Giovanna Sforza, illegitimate daughter of Ludovico Sforza is the woman depicted in the drawing.

Some of those who disagree with the attribution to Leonardo believe the portrait is by an early 19th-century German artist imitating the style of the Italian Renaissance, although radiocarbon dating tests show a much earlier date for the vellum. It has also been denounced as a forgery. The white lead has been dated to be at least 225 years old. The work sold for just under $22,000 at auction in 1998, and was bought by its current owner Peter Silverman in 2007. He has championed the attribution to Leonardo, supported by the analysis of academics Martin Kemp and Pascal Cotte.

The drawing was shown as a Leonardo in an exhibition in Sweden in 2010 and was estimated by various newspaper reports to be worth more than $160 million. The Bella Principessa remains locked in a vault in a secret Swiss location.

According to Kemp and Cotte, the sheet was cut from a Milanese vellum book, La Sforziada, in Warsaw, which celebrates the marriage in 1496 of Galeazzo Sanseverino with Bianca, the illegitimate daughter of Ludovico Sforza, Leonardo's employer. It has subsequently been exhibited in Urbino, Monza and Nanjing; and a facsimile edition of the portrait and the book in Warsaw has been published.

== Description ==
The portrait is a mixed media drawing in pen and brown ink with red, black and white chalk, on vellum, 33 by 23.9 centimetres (10 by 9 in) which has been laid down on an oak board.

There are signs of restoration with thin paint applied with a brush. Three stitch holes in the left-hand margin of the vellum, indicate that the leaf was once in a bound volume.

It represents a girl in her early teens, depicted in profile, the usual way in which Italian artists of the 15th century portraited women. The girl's dress and hairstyle indicate that she was a member of the Court of Milan during the 1490s. If it truly is a Renaissance work, it would have been executed in the 1490s according to Kemp and Cotte. If the subject is Bianca Sforza it would date from 1496, the year of her marriage and her death.

Reflecting the subject of an Italian woman of high nobility, Kemp named the portrait La Bella Principessa, although acknowledging that Sforza ladies were not princesses.

== Provenance ==
If the drawing is originally a Leonardo illustration for the present-day Warsaw copy of the Sforziad, its history is the same as that of the book until the drawing was cut out from the volume. The book is known to have been rebound at the turn of the 18th and 19th century.

The modern provenance of the drawing is known only from 1955 and is documented only from 1998. According to a lawsuit brought by Jeanne Marchig against Christie's after the drawing's re-attribution to Leonardo, the drawing belonged to her husband Giannino Marchig, an art restorer, when they married in 1955. Jeanne Marchig became the owner of the drawing in 1983, following her husband's death.

The work was included in a sale at Christie's in New York on January 30, 1998, catalogued as Young Girl in Profile in Renaissance Dress, and described as "German School, early 19th Century". The seller was Jeanne Marchig. It was sold for $21,850 (including buyer's premium) to a New York art dealer who sold it on for a similar amount in 2007.

In 2007, art dealer Peter Silverman, purchased the portrait from a gallery on East 73rd Street, owned by Kate Ganz. Peter Silverman believed that the portrait was possibly from an older period, potentially dating back to the Renaissance period, and sought the opinions of experts who have since attributed it to Leonardo da Vinci. In 2010 one of those experts, Martin Kemp, made it the subject of his book co-authored with Pascal Cotte, La Bella Principessa: The Story of the New Masterpiece by Leonardo da Vinci. This is now revised in Kemp and Cotte's La Bella Principessa di Leonardo da Vinci. Ritratto di Bianca Sforza, Florence, 2012.

The drawing was shown as a Leonardo in a 2010 exhibition called And there was Light in Eriksberg, Gothenburg, in Sweden, and was estimated by various newspaper reports to be worth more than $160 million. Silverman promoted the Leonardo connection in his 2012 book Leonardo's Lost Princess: One Man's Quest to Authenticate an Unknown Portrait by Leonardo da Vinci and has declined an offer for the portrait of $80 million.

== The fingerprint dispute ==
Pascal Cotte of Lumière Technology in Paris performed a multi-spectral digital scan of the work. The high resolution images were used by Peter Paul Biro, a forensic art examiner who studied a fingerprint on the vellum which he said was "highly comparable" to a fingerprint on Leonardo's unfinished St. Jerome in the Wilderness. In 2010 David Grann published an article about the drawing in The New Yorker, which implied that Biro had been involved with forged paintings attributed to Jackson Pollock.

Biro consequently sued the writer and the publisher of The New Yorker, Advance Media, for defamation in 2011. The judge in the case, J. Paul Oetken, ruled that the article contained eight instances that were capable of a defamatory meaning. He eventually dismissed the case on a technicality arguing that Biro was a limited purpose public figure. An appeals court supported the initial judgment.

The fingerprint evidence is not cited in the revised Italian edition of the book by Kemp and Cotte or in any of Kemp's subsequent publications. The story of the research and attribution is told in Kemp's Living with Leonardo.

== Support for Leonardo attribution ==
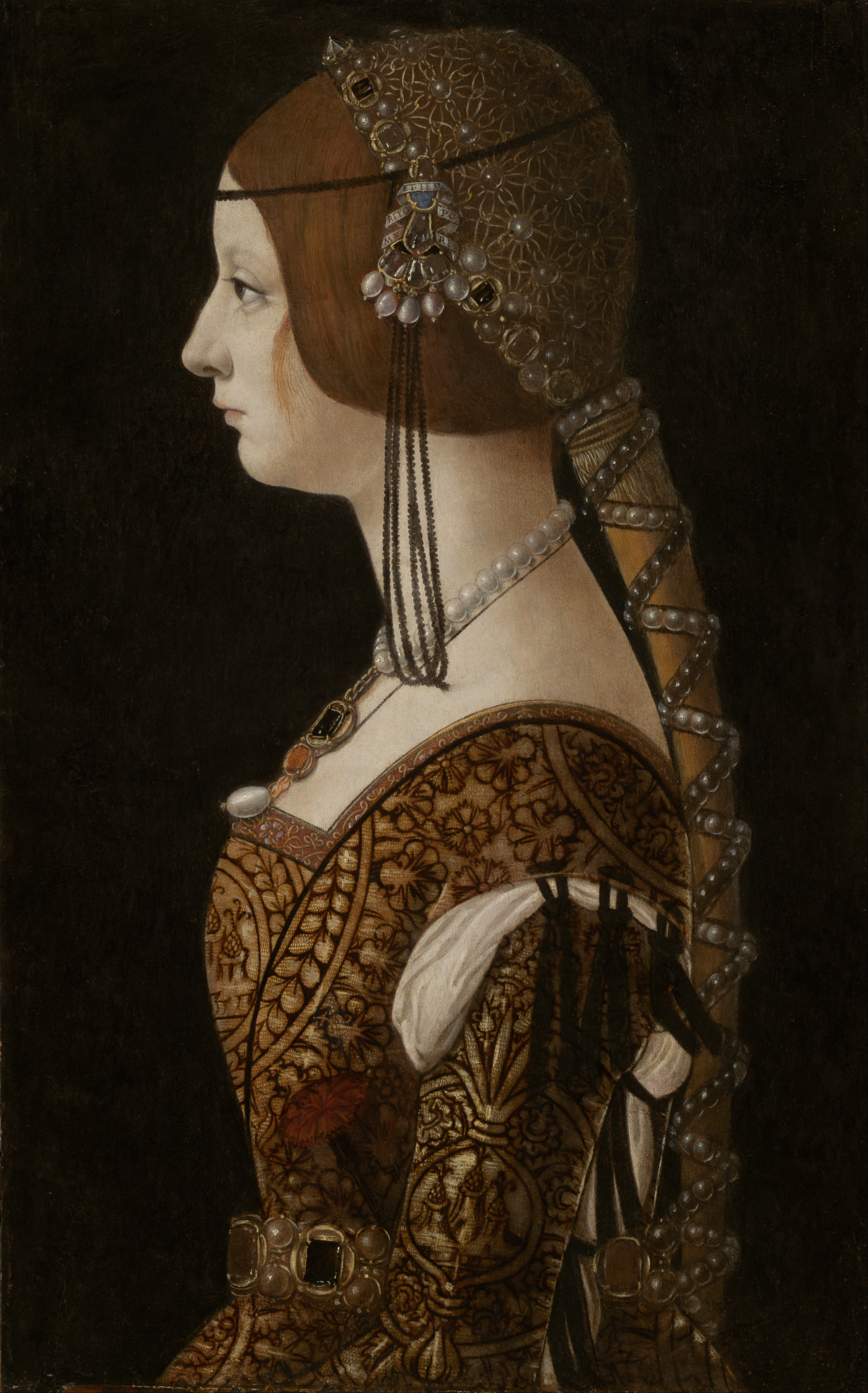
A portrait by Ambrogio da Predis of Bianca Maria Sforza showing a similar hairstyle (National Gallery of Art)

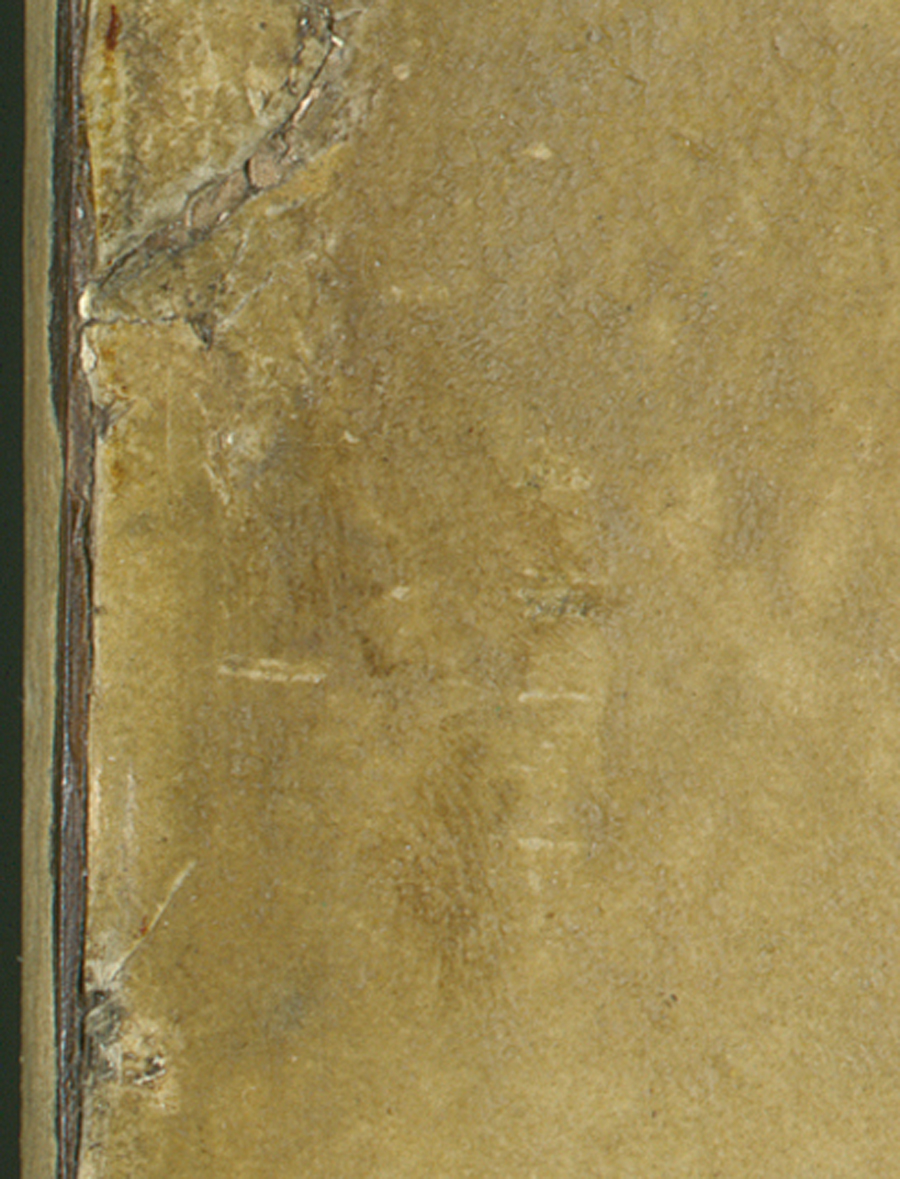
Detail of the upper left corner, revealing a fingerprint which has been suggested as being similar to one of Leonardo's.

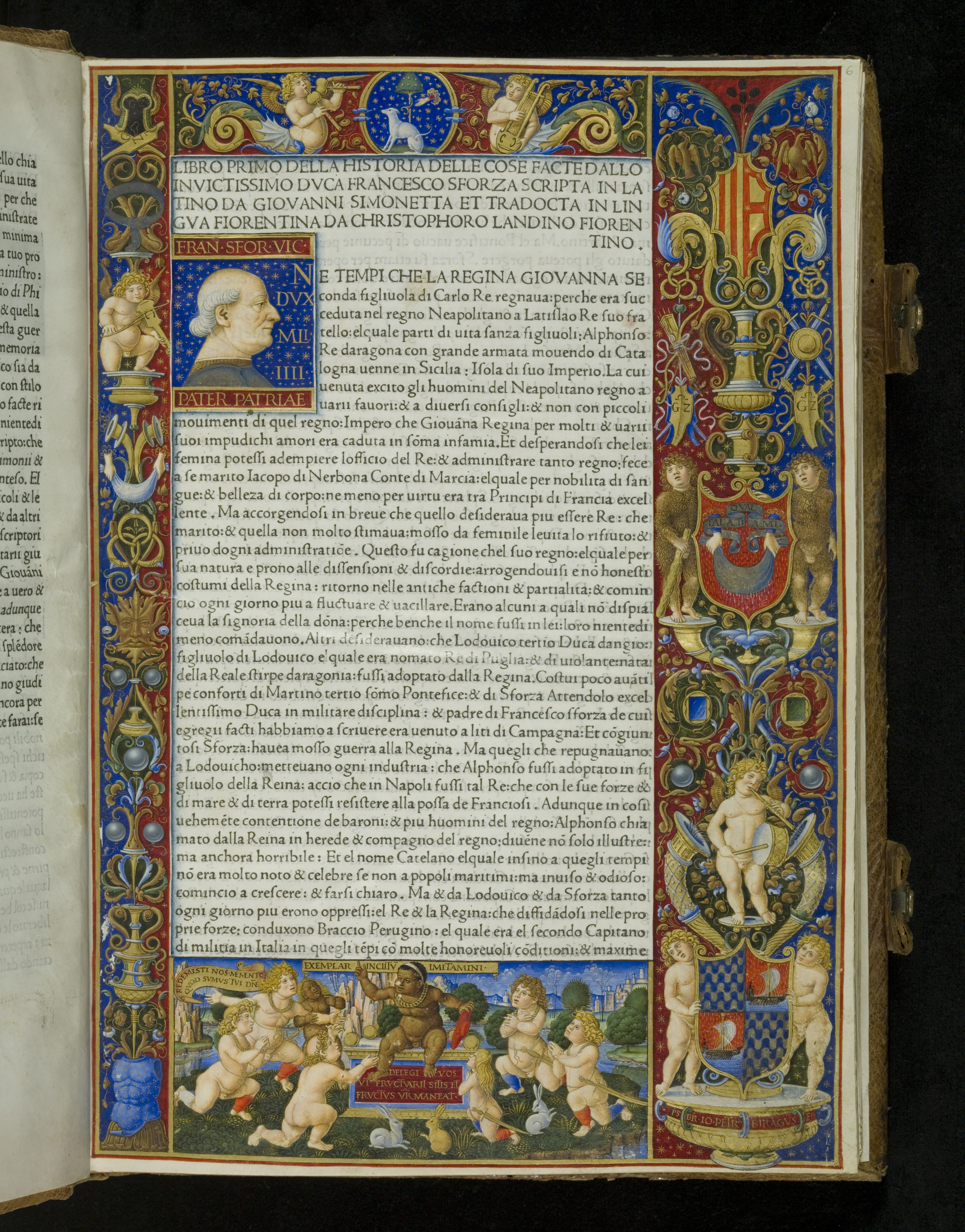
A page of La Sforziada from the National Library of Poland (Biblioteka Narodowa) in Warsaw

The first study of the drawing was published by Cristina Geddo. Geddo attributes this work to Leonardo based not only on stylistic considerations, extremely high quality and left-handed hatching, but also on the evidence of the combination of black, white and red chalks (the trois crayons technique). Leonardo was the first artist in Italy to use pastels, a drawing technique he had learned from the French artist Jean Perréal, whom he met in Milan in 1494 and/or 1499. Leonardo acknowledges his debt to Perréal in the Codex Atlanticus. Geddo also points out that the "coazzone" of the sitter's hairstyle was fashionable during the same period. Strong support for the attribution has come from Elizabetta Gnignera, the costume historian, in her book La Bella Svelata, which studies a wide range of comparative costumes and hair styles.

=== Expert opinions ===
A number of Leonardo experts and art historians have concurred with the attribution to Leonardo, including:

- Martin Kemp, Emeritus Research Professor in the History of Art at the University of Oxford,
- Carlo Pedretti, late professor emeritus of art history and Armand Hammer Chair in Leonardo Studies at the University of California, Los Angeles
- Nicholas Turner, former curator at the British Museum and the J. Paul Getty Museum
- Alessandro Vezzosi, the director of the Museo Ideale Leonardo da Vinci in Vinci, Italy
- Cristina Geddo, an expert on Milanese Leonardesques and Giampietrino,
- Mina Gregori, professor emerita at the University of Florence.

=== Analysis ===
In 2010, after a two-year study of the picture, Kemp published his findings and conclusions in a book, La Bella Principessa: The Story of the New Masterpiece by Leonardo da Vinci. Kemp describes the work as "a portrait of a young lady on the cusp of maturity [which] shows her with the fashionable costume and hairstyle of a Milanese court lady in the 1490s". By process of elimination involving the inner group of young Sforza women, Kemp suggested that she is probably Bianca Sforza, the illegitimate (but later legitimized) daughter of Ludovico Sforza ("Il Moro"), duke of Milan. In 1496, when Bianca was no more than 14, she married Galeazzo Sanseverino, captain of the duke's Milanese forces and a patron of Leonardo. Bianca was dead within months of her marriage, having suffered from a stomach complaint (possibly an ectopic pregnancy). Kemp pointed out that Milanese ladies were often the dedicatees of volumes of poetry on vellum, and that such a portrait of a "beloved lady" would have made a suitable title page or main illustration for a set of verses produced on the occasion of her marriage or death.

The physical and scientific evidence from multispectral analysis and study of the painting, as described by Kemp in the first edition of his book with Cotte, may be summarized as follows:

- The technique of the portrait is black, red and white chalks (trois crayons, a French medium), with pen and ink.
- The drawing and hatching was carried out entirely by a left-handed artist, as Leonardo is known to have been, although restorations are by a right-hander.
- There are significant pentimenti.
- The portrait is characterized by particularly subtle details, such as the relief of the ear hinted at below the hair, and the amber of the sitter's iris.
- There are strong stylistic parallels with the Windsor silverpoint drawing of A Woman in Profile, which, like other head studies by Leonardo, features comparable delicate pentimenti to the profile.
- The members of the Sforza family were always portrayed in profile, whereas Ludovico's mistresses were not.
- The proportions of the head and face reflect the rules that Leonardo articulated in his notebooks.
- The interlace or knotwork ornament in the costume and caul corresponds to patterns that Leonardo explored in other works and in the logo designs for his Academy.
- The portrait was executed on vellum—used by him in his illustrations for Luca Pacioli's De divina proportione (1498). We know from his writings that he was interested in the French technique of dry colouring on parchment (vellum). He specifically noted that he should ask the French artist, Jean Perréal, who was in Milan in 1494 and perhaps on other occasions, about the method of colouring in dry chalks.
- The format of the vellum support is that of a √2 rectangle, a format used for several of his portraits.
- The vellum sheet was cut from a codex, probably a volume of poetry of the kind presented to mark major events in the Sforza women's lives.
- The vellum includes a palmprint in the chalk pigment on the neck of the sitter, which is characteristic of Leonardo's technique.
- The green of the sitter's costume was obtained with a simple diffusion of black chalk applied on top of the yellowish tone of the vellum support. (Kemp has subsequently expressed reservations about this evidence.)
- The nuances of the flesh tints were also achieved by exploiting the tone of the vellum and allowing it to show through the transparent media.
- There are noteworthy similarities between this work and the portrait of Cecilia Gallerani, including the handling of the eyes, the modelling of flesh tones using the palm of the hand, the intricacy of the patterns of the knotwork ornament and the treatment of the contours.
- The now somewhat pale original hatching in pen and ink was retouched in ink in a later restoration, which is far less fluid, precise and rhythmic.
- There have been some re-touchings over the years, most extensively in the costume and headdress, but the restoration has not affected the expression and physiognomy of the face to a significant degree, and has not seriously affected the overall impact of the portrait.

=== Warsaw copy of the Sforziada ===
In 2011, after the publication of the first edition of their book, Kemp and Pascal Cotte reported that there was evidence that the drawing had once been part of a copy in the National Library of Poland in Warsaw of the Sforziada. This is a printed book with hand-illuminated additions containing a long propagandistic poem in praise of the father of Ludovico Sforza, who was Leonardo's patron, recounting the career. The Warsaw copy, printed on vellum with added illumination, was given to Galeazzo Sanseverino, a military commander under Ludovico Sforza, on his marriage to Bianca Sforza in 1496. Kemp and Cotte identified where two sheets were missing from this volume from which they believe the drawing was cut. Kemp and Cotte say that, although "the dimensions and precise locations of the holes in the portrait cannot be obtained with precision", the three holes on the left-hand side of the drawing can be aligned with three of the five stitch holes in the sheets in the book.

According to Kemp and Cotte, the association with the Sforziada suggests that the drawing is a portrait of Bianca Sforza, who was the daughter of Ludovico Sforza and his mistress Bernardina de Corradis. At the time of the portrait, she was around thirteen years old. Leonardo painted three other portraits associated with the family or court of Ludovico Sforza.

The Polish scholar Bogdan Horodyski in 1954-1956 reached the conclusion that the Warsaw illumination refers to both the deceased dukes Galeazzo Maria and Gian Galeazzo and to the dynastic downfall after the usurpation of Ludovico il Moro. The reproduction of the unpublished heraldic figure attributed to Antonio Grifo, illuminated in the incunabulum "Comedia" by Dante (Cremonese, Venice 1491), now at Casa di Dante in Rome, shows the original coat of arms and insignia of the family of Galeazzo Sanseverino, and the comparison with those illuminated by Birago is not corresponding. Developing this hypothesis, Carla Glori suggests that Caterina Sforza, the daughter of Galeazzo Maria and half-sister of Gian Galeazzo, was the owner of the Warsaw Sforziad and that she gave it to the family of her deceased half-brother between 1496 and 1499. Horodyski's ideas have recently been revived by Katarzyna Krzyzagórska-Pisarek in her "La Bella Principessa. Arguments against the Attribution to Leonardo", Artibus et Historiae, XXXVI, 215, pp. 61– 89. Pisarek is a member of Artwatch UK, which has offered polemic denunciations of Kemp.

== Opposition to Leonardo attribution ==
The New Yorker article discussed the troubling circumstances in which Kemp attributed this work to Leonardo. But apart from this, strong indications are going against the hypothesis of authenticity, and the attribution to Leonardo has been challenged by a number of scholars who showed interest. Among the reasons for doubting its authorship are the lack of provenance prior to the 20th century – unusual given Leonardo's renown dating from his own lifetime, as well as the fame of the purported subject's family – and the fact that it was on vellum. Only once did Leonardo use vellum and old sheets of it are easily acquired by forgers. Leonardo scholar Pietro C. Marani discounts the significance of the drawing being made by a left-handed artist, noting that imitators of Leonardo's work have emulated this characteristic in the past. Marani is also troubled by use of vellum, "monotonous" detail, use of colored pigments in specific areas, firmness of touch and lack of craquelure. A museum director who wished to remain anonymous believes the drawing is "a screaming 20th-century fake", and finds the damages and repair to the drawing suspicious. The work was not requested for inclusion in the 2011–12 exhibition at the National Gallery in London, which specifically covered Leonardo's period in Milan; Nicholas Penny, director of the National Gallery, said simply "We have not asked to borrow it."

Carlo Pedretti, one of the scholars who attribute this work to Leonardo, had before made a mistake attributing a painting from the twentieth century to him.

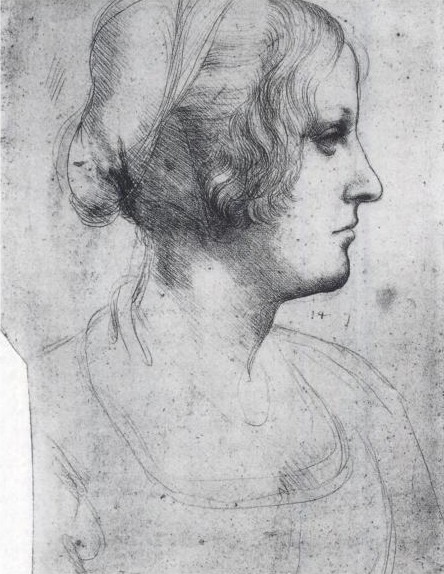
Drawing of a woman by Leonardo. A stylistic similarity has been noted between this drawing and the Bella Principessa.

Klaus Albrecht Schröder, director of the Albertina, Vienna, said "No one is convinced it is a Leonardo," and David Ekserdjian, a scholar of 16th-century Italian drawings, wrote that he suspects the work is a "counterfeit". Neither Carmen Bambach of the Metropolitan Museum of Art, one of the primary scholars of Leonardo's drawings, nor Everett Fahy, her colleague at the Metropolitan, accepts the attribution to Leonardo.

Several forensic experts on fingerprints have discounted Biro's conclusions, finding the partial fingerprint taken from the drawing too poorly detailed to offer conclusive evidence. Biro's description of the print as being "highly comparable" to a known fingerprint of Leonardo's has similarly been discounted by fingerprint examiners as being too vague an assessment to establish authorship. When asked if he may have been mistaken to suggest that the fingerprint was Leonardo's, Biro answered "It's possible. Yes." Kemp's later publications do not use the finger-print evidence in support of the attribution.

Noting the lack of mention of dissenting opinion in Kemp's publication, Richard Dorment, the former husband of Ganz, wrote in the Telegraph: "Although purporting to be a work of scholarship, his book has none of the balanced analysis you would expect from such an acclaimed historian. For La Bella Principessa, as he called the girl in the study, is not art history – it is advocacy."

Fred R. Kline, an independent art historian and author of Leonardo's Holy Child--The Discovery of a Leonardo da Vinci Masterpiece: A Connoisseur's Search for Lost Art in America, is known for his discovery of "Leonardo's model drawing" of Infant Jesus (which has yet to be accepted by Leonardo scholars) and for a number of important discoveries of lost art by the Nazarene Brotherhood, a group of German painters working in Rome during the early 19th century who revived the styles and subjects of the Italian Renaissance. Kline has proposed one of the Nazarenes, Julius Schnorr von Carolsfeld (1794–1872), as the creator of the drawing. In evidence, Kline points to a drawing on vellum by Schnorr, Half-nude Female, in the collection of the Kunsthalle Mannheim in Germany, which he suggests depicts the same model, although older, as portrayed in La Bella Principessa.

Comparative material-testing of the vellum supports of the Mannheim Schnorr and La Bella Principessa were anticipated to occur in the New York federal court lawsuit Marchig v. Christie's, brought in May 2010 by the original owner of La Bella Principessa, who accused Christie's of breach of fiduciary duty, negligent misrepresentation and other claims. However, the court dismissed the suit on the ground that the claims were brought years too late (Statute of Limitations and Laches), and thus the merits of the suit were never addressed. The district court decision was upheld on appeal.

Disagreements with the attribution to Leonardo were made before the discovery of the missing page in the Warsaw Sforziada book. No alternative attribution has been accepted by Kemp or his research group. Kline claims that no comparative scientific analysis has been made of the vellum supports in question: the Warsaw Sforziada book, the Mannheim Schnorr (an alternate attribution), and La Bella Principessa, although Kemp and Cotte have shown a close match between the vellum of the portrait and the book. Further analysis of the vellum could possibly provide the conclusive evidence that may support or disqualify Schnorr's authorship.

In November 2015, notorious art forger Shaun Greenhalgh claimed that he created the work in 1978, at the age of 20; Greenhalgh said the woman's face is that of a supermarket check-out girl named Sally who worked in Bolton, outside Manchester. In his memoir A Forger's Tale, written in prison, Greenhalgh claims as a 17 year old to have forged the drawing by obtaining an old piece of vellum from a reused 1587 land deed. Kemp said he found the claim hilarious and ridiculous.

== Popular culture ==
The work of art was studied on the PBS program NOVA in 2012 in a program titled Mystery of a Masterpiece, from NOVA/National Geographic/PBS, which aired on January 25, 2012.
