= István Agh =

István Agh (1709, Sepsiszentkirály, Hungary (now Ilieni, Romania) – 22 January 1786, Kolozsvár, Hungary (now Cluj-Napoca, Romania)) was a Hungarian Unitarian bishop in Transylvania.

== Life ==
Agh descended from nobility. Born to Mihály Agh and a woman with the surname of Szabo, all three of his sisters had married Unitarian ministers. He attended primary school in his hometown, and then the Unitarians main school in Kolozsvár. In 1734, he was sent to multiple academies throughout Europe, in places such as Amsterdam, Halle, and the universities of Leiden and Rotterdam, and returned home in 1737. In Kolozsvár, from 1738 onwards, he taught physics, geometry, logic, metaphysics, theology and Hebrew and Greek languages at the local Unitarian college. His textbooks for particular subjects were self-written and have survived in manuscript form and were in use for several generations. His theological works on the Old Testaments concept of God and his faithful followers influence by 18th-century deism shows, but the works also had Cartesian influences.

In 1754, he became a notary in the Unitarian Church, and after the death of Mihály Lombard de Szentábrahám on 30 March 1758, chose him to be the synod bishop of Kissáros on 21 May. As a bishop, with the main church council, he was forced to endure strong secular issues, which formerly had a church canon. In order to remedy the situation, Joseph II, the Holy Roman Emperor, presented the church grievances, and each point with respect to the results achieved; He obtained permission to print two volumes written by Mihály's Unitarian Church of Transylvania. At the time of his episcopate in 1784, they merged into the Polish Transylvanian Unitarian communities into the Hungarian Church.

Married three times, his first wife was Zsuzsanna Szentábrahámi. His second wife was Anna Szentkirályi, and his third and final wife was the third Zsuzsa Almasi. He had four children altogether.

== Works ==
- Institutiones Metaphysicae
- Institutiones Physicae
- Conpendium Phisicae usum Auditorum incipientum (1764)
- Institutio geographica
- Notae quaedam in Logicam (1740)
- Grammatica Hebraica
- Loca Veteris Foederis, ex quibus ... Trinitatis Dogma probari solet (1746)
- Loca Novis Foederis eplicata
- Notae in Theologiam Szent-Abrahanianam, vel: Notae in Systhema Universae Theologiae Christianae
- Commentarius in Epistolam ad Romanes caeteras Paulinas. Inchoavit. (1858)
- Ünnepi, vasárnapi és halotti prédikációk, magyarul és latinul
- Halotti szónoklatok - Orationes
- Historia Regis Borusciorum, Friderici II-di, franciából latinra fordítva 1764. júliusban
- Theologia Christiana I.-V.

== Sources ==
- József Benkő, György Szabó
- Dr. Boros György: Agh Istvan püspök élete főtekintettel külföldi tanulására, tanári és irodalmi munkásságára
- Jakab Elek: Agh István püspök élete és kora
