= Guilherme Biro =

Guilherme Biro may refer to:

- Guilherme Biro (footballer, born 2000), Brazilian football defender
- Guilherme Biro (footballer, born 2004), Brazilian football midfielder
