= Dora Biro =

Behavioral biologist

- Education: University of Oxford
- Scientific career
- Workplaces: University of Rochester, University of Oxford, Kyoto University

External videos
- "Dora Biro - Collective Action at the Cognition-culture Interface", ASAB Summer, September 16, 2019.

Dora Biro is a behavioral biologist and the Beverly Petterson Bishop and Charles W. Bishop Professor, Brain and Cognitive Sciences at the University of Rochester. She was previously a Professor of Animal Behaviour at the University of Oxford. and a visiting professor in the Primate Research Institute of Kyoto University in Japan. Biro studies social behavior, problem solving, and learning in birds and primates.

== Early life and education ==
Biro earned her BA in Biological Sciences (1997) and DPhil in Animal Behaviour (2002) at the University of Oxford.

== Career ==
Biro was a postdoctoral research fellow with funding from the Japan Society for the Promotion of Science (JSPS) in 2002-2003. She held an Engineering and Physical Sciences Research Council (EPSRC) postdoctoral fellowship at the University of Oxford from 2003 to 2006. She was a visiting professor at the Primate Research Institute of Kyoto University, Japan in 2007.

In 2007 Biro returned to the University of Oxford as a Royal Society University Research Fellow. In 2013 she became an associate professor in animal behaviour in the department of zoology and a fellow of St Hugh's College, Oxford and in 2019 a full professor in animal behaviour in the department of zoology.

As of 2021 Biro joined the University of Rochester in Rochester, New York and was appointed as the Beverly Petterson Bishop and Charles W. Bishop Professor of Brain and Cognitive Sciences.

== Research ==
Biro studies social behavior, problem solving, and learning in birds and primates, with particular attention to processes that support living in groups. She uses techniques such as field observations and technologies such as GPS tracking, accelerometry, camera trapping, artificial intelligence software for chimpanzee facial recognition, and mathematical modeling. She has also tried introducing robots to see if they can influence avian behavior.

Biro studies the impact of individual differences in two major systems of behavior: social learning and group decision-making in the navigation of homing pigeons, and cultural learning among wild chimpanzees.

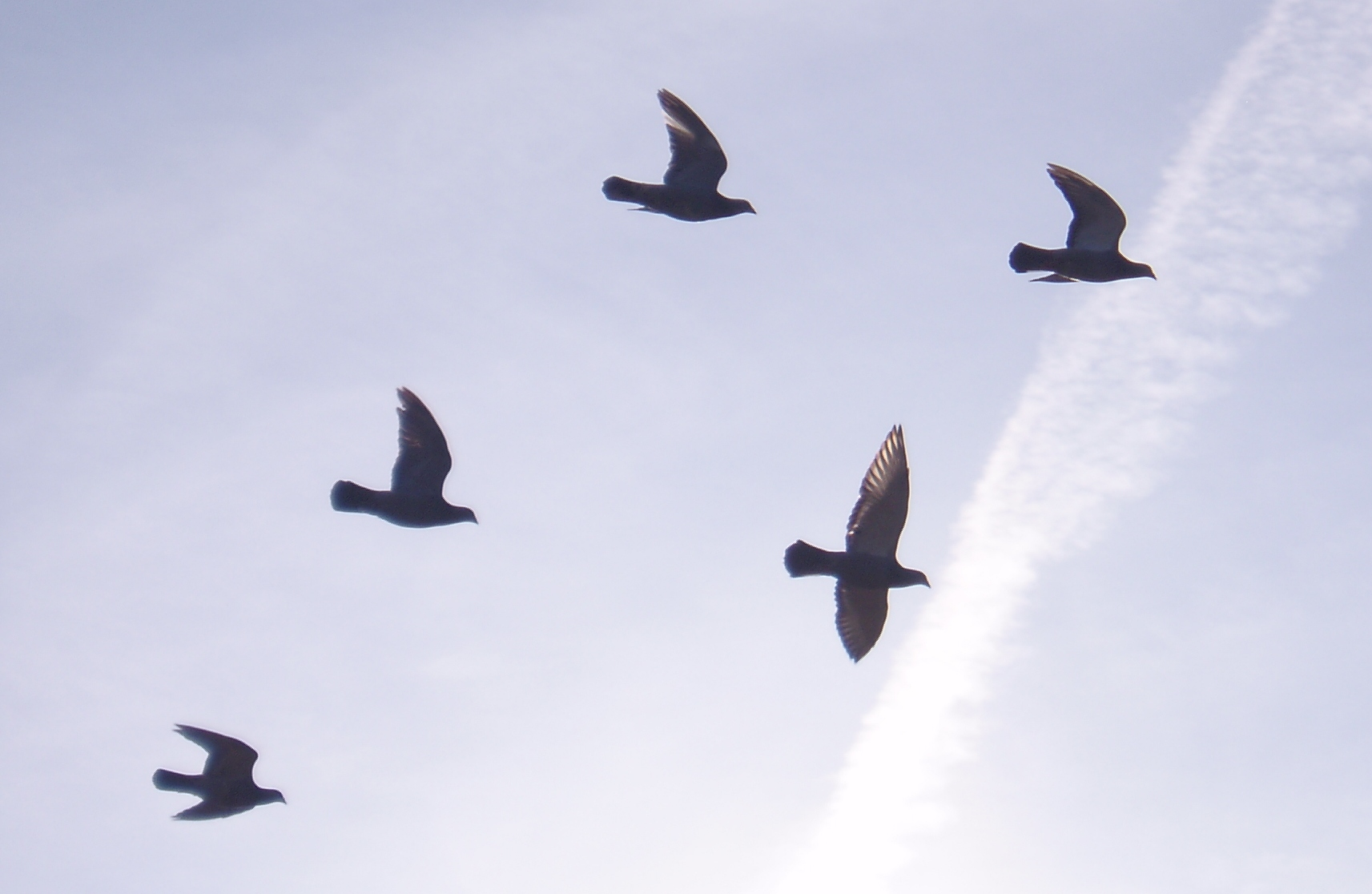
Homing pigeons in flight

Through a series of studies at Oxford, Biro has examined how homing pigeons change their navigation behavior and learn new routes. Birds prefer individual routes and can remember them for years. After 12 flights, pigeons tended to fix their route. While pigeons may gradually shorten their routes over time, they are more likely to do so after a new "naive" bird is paired with a bird that has flown the route before. The introduction of a newcomer increased the time spent on exploration and resulted in the collective learning of better routes. Biro's work on bird navigation has presented evidence for cumulative cultural evolution, the ability to transfer knowledge across generations. This type of learning was previously thought to be too cognitively complex for birds, and possibly limited to humans.

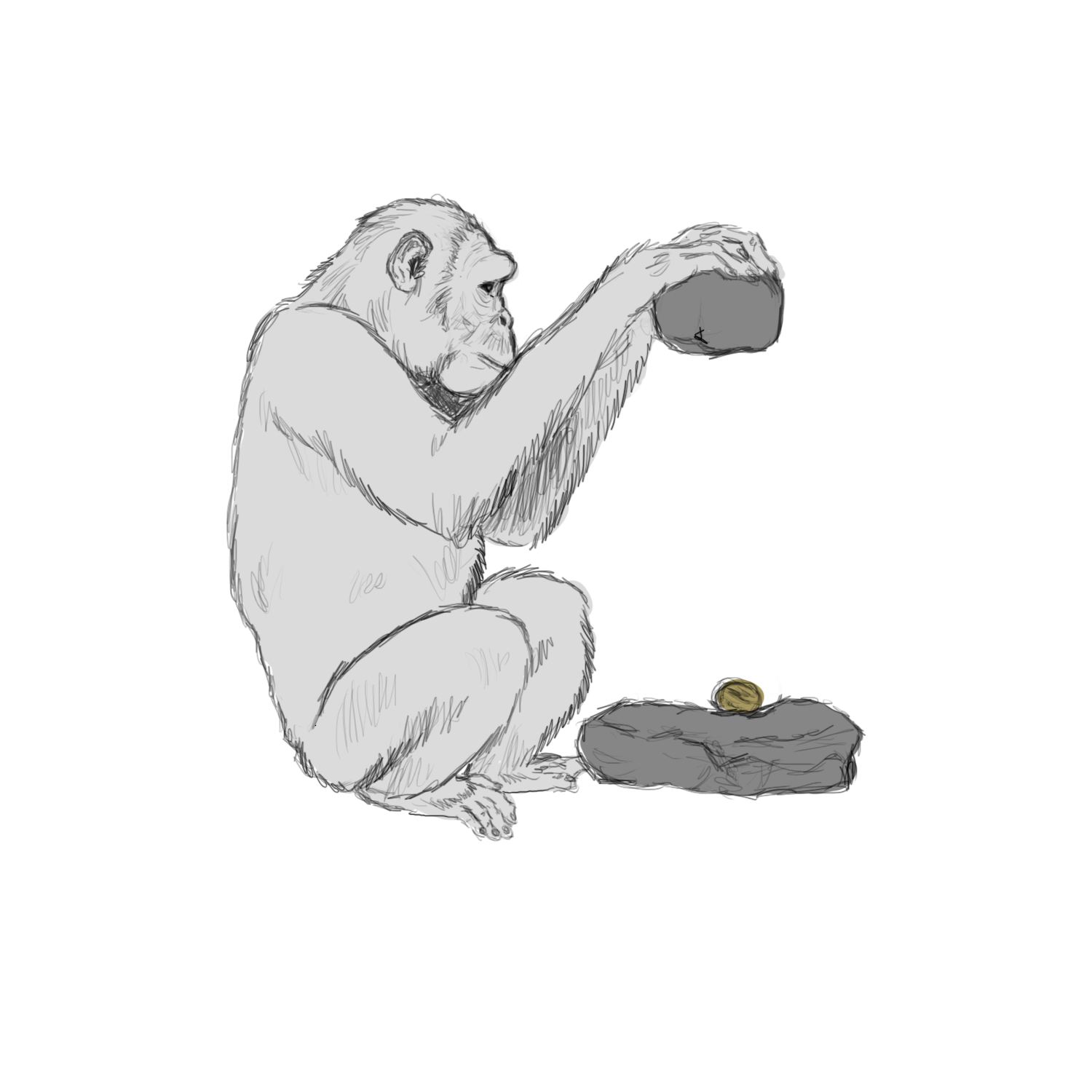
Chimpanzee using stones to crack nuts

In addition, her work with at Kyoto University with wild chimpanzees has shown that younger inexperienced chimpanzees are more likely to engage in innovation (like cracking a new kind of nut) than older chimpanzees, and more likely to learn from each other. Older chimpanzees were less likely to learn innovative behaviors from younger ones than from those of their own age or older. New behaviors were more likely to be learned by adults if they were introduced by an adult new to the group.

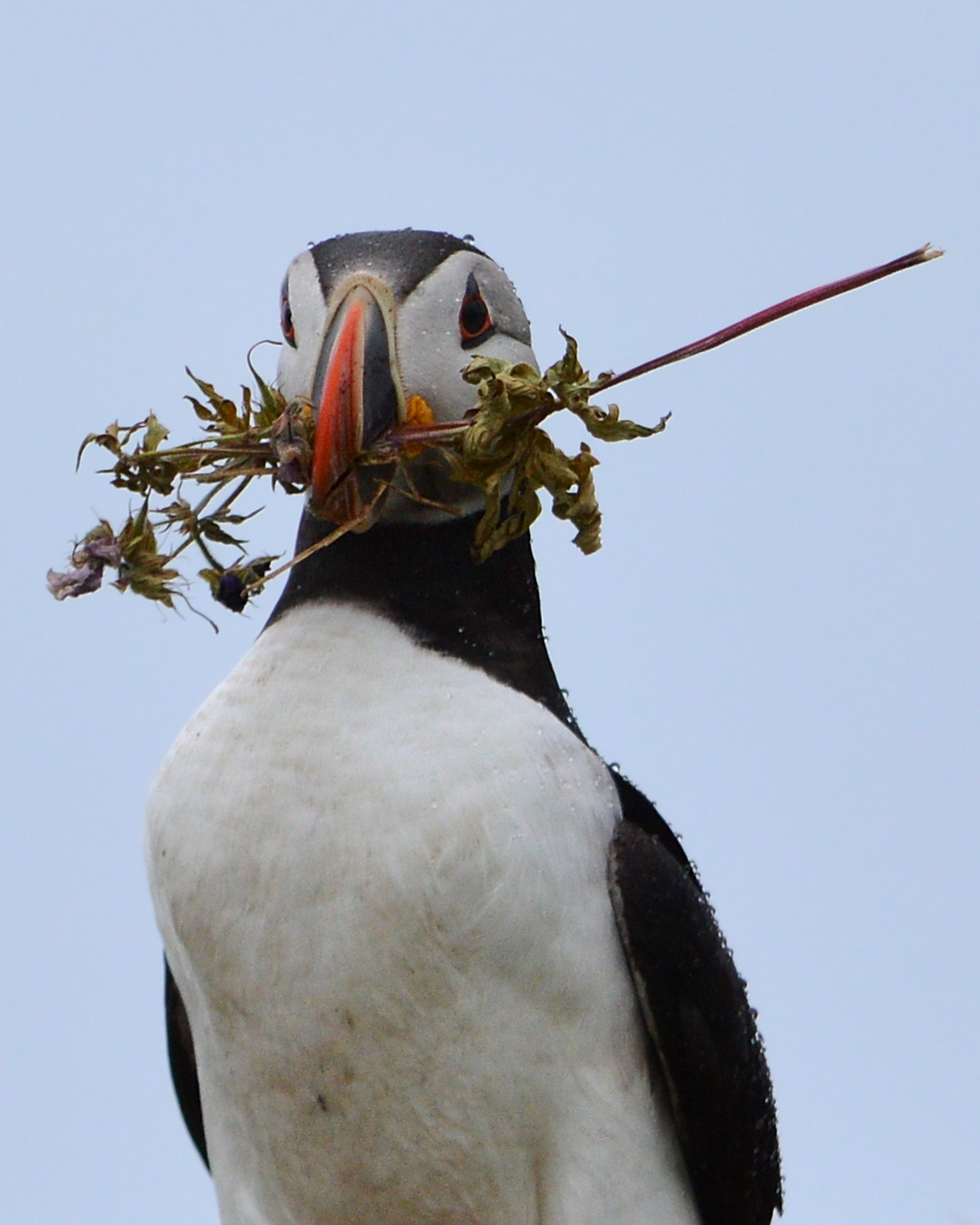
Atlantic Puffin holding stick

In 2020, Biro and others reported the first observations of tool use in seabirds, after Atlantic puffins at breeding colonies in Wales and Iceland were observed spontaneously using small wooden sticks to scratch themselves. In other work Biro has suggested that tool use is more likely to scaffold learning if the tools themselves are durable.
