= Unitárius Hírnök =

Unitárius Hírnök was a magazine for Hungarian Unitarians living in Romania. It was published between March 1933 and October 1938. Dénes Lőrincz priest and Géza Lőrincz were the editors of the newspaper, which published 400 copies for families living in Bucharest and in the Romanian Old Kingdom.

The main issues about its articles were in connection with the life inside the church and Hungarian cultural events in Romania. Other topics included the studies of theology and problems caused by the minority status of the nation. Some of its articles are valuable as reference regarding the life of Unitarians in Bucharest.

== Sources ==
- Romániai magyar irodalmi lexikon: Szépirodalom, közírás, tudományos irodalom, művelődés V. (S–Zs). Főszerk. Dávid Gyula. Bukarest–Kolozsvár: Kriterion; Kolozsvár: Erdélyi Múzeum-Egyesület. 2010
