= Sámuel Bíró de Homoródszentmárton =

Sámuel Bíró de Homoródszentmárton (Hungarian: homoródszentmártoni Bíró Sámuel, archaically Biró; 1665 – 21 February 1721) was an advisor of the Governor of Transylvania and the first main caretaker of the Unitarian Church of Transylvania (1718–1721).

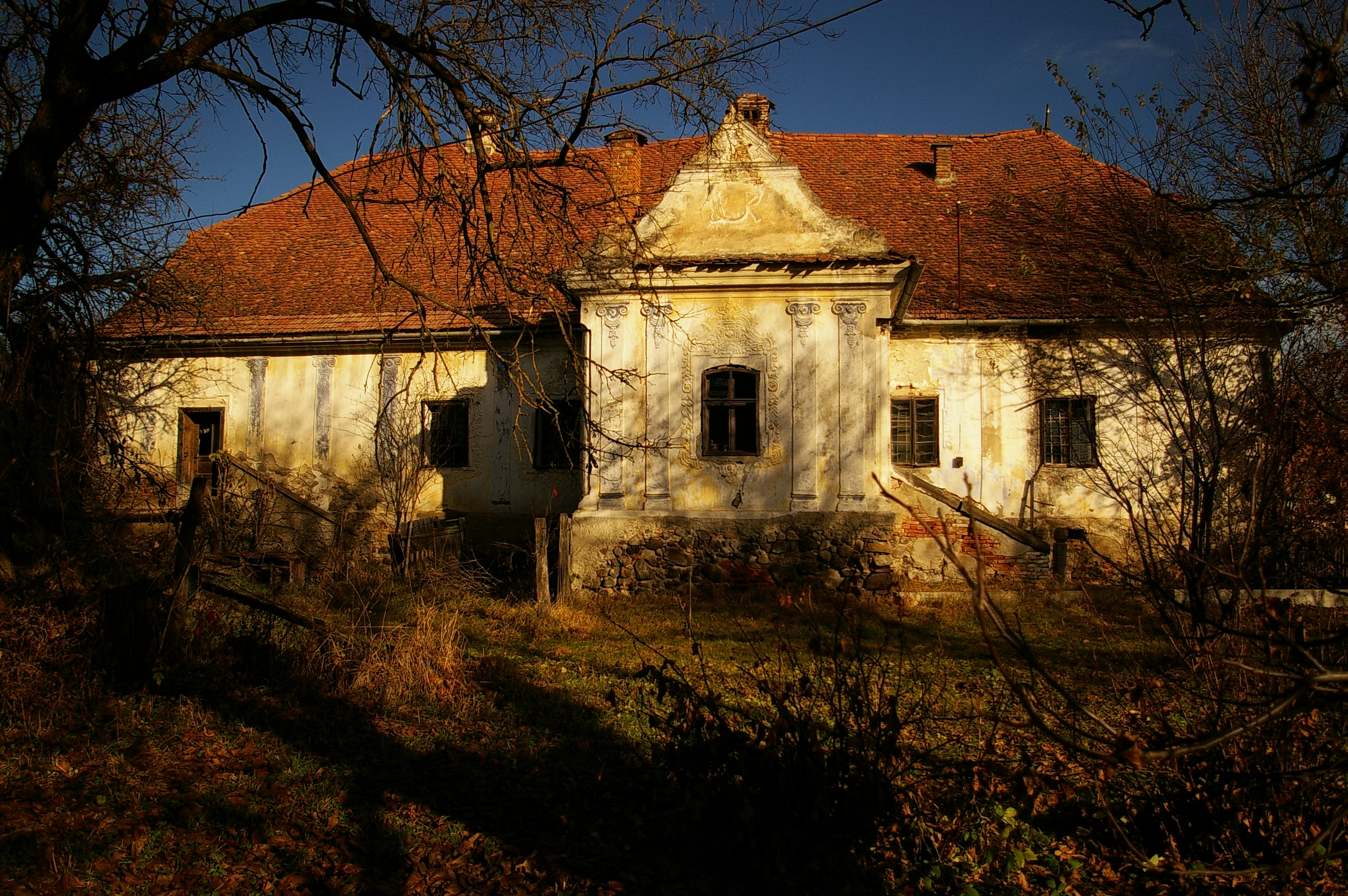
Mansion of the family

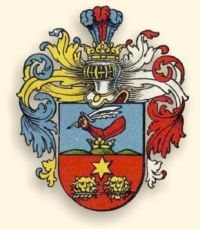
Coat of arms of the family

== Works ==
Bíró Sámuel: Nemes Erdély országának státusáról, lakosairól, lakóhelyeiről és folyóvizeiről való oktatás, melyet írt volt 1710-ben néhai Bíró Sámuel, tanács úr Erdélyben Székelyudvarhely, 2007

== Sources ==
- Helezd Mihály: Homoródszentmártoni Biró Sámuel Barassó, 1721
- Michael Helczdorffer: Genealogia (latin) 1721
- Sándor János: Székelykeresztúri Unitárius Gimnázium történelme 1896
- Fekete János: A székelykeresztúri Orbán Balázs – volt unitárius – gimnázium 200 éves története.
- Beke György : Régi erdélyi skólák Tankönyvkiadó, Budapest, 1989 300.
- Koncz J. Unitárius főurak a kuruc világban Keresztény Magvető 1902, Unitárius Kislexikon 31.old)
- Kovács Sándor (2002). "Adalék homoródszentmártoni Biró Sámuel (1665–1721) főgondnok életéhez" (PDF). Keresztény Magvető. Vol. 108, no. 1.
- Szinnyei, József (2000), Magyar írók élete és munkái [Life and Works of Hungarian Writers] (in Hungarian), Budapest: Arcanum, ISBN 978-9638602992
- Kovács Sándor Homoródszentmártoni Biró Sámuel (1665–1721) www.oroksegunk.ro/i-evf-2007/1-szam/eletutak/homorodszent... (hozzáférés: 2017.01.02)
- Kovács Sándor: Adalék homoródszentmártoni Bíró Sámuel (1665–1721) főgondnok életéhez. In: Keresztény Magvető, 108 (2002). nr. 1, p.12–19.
- Wass cs lt (Erdélyi Nemzeti Múzeum Levéltára a A Nemzeti Levéltár Kolozs megyei fiókjának őrízetében Kolozsváron), 30. doboz (3035–3138. sz.) iratai között: A Wass család pere Gerebenesért (Torda vm) homoródszentmártoni Bíró János és felesége: Orbán Erzsébet örököseivel (1632–1669)
- Pálmay József: Udvarhely vármegye nemes családjai. Székely-Udvarhely: 1900. 37–39.
- Simon Mihály - Unitárius főemberek a kuruc világban 206.old. KM_1902_04
