= Peter Paul Biro =

Canadian art analyst

Peter Paul Biró (1954–2024) was a forensic art analyst, known for his work in authenticating paintings using fingerprint analysis. He was involved in several high-profile cases, including the authentication of works attributed to artists Jackson Pollock, Leonardo da Vinci, and Goodridge Roberts. Biro's techniques and conclusions were subjects of debate and scrutiny. In 2009, The New Yorker published an article that critically examined Biro's methods. Subsequently, Biro filed a defamation lawsuit against the magazine, the article's author, and others. The courts later dismissed the lawsuit.

== Early life and background ==
Peter Paul Biro was born in 1954 in Budapest and emigrated to Montreal with his family as a teenager. He left college early to join his father and brother in the art restoration business. Through this business, Biro helped to authenticate a painting by J. M. W. Turner. While examining the Turner painting, he developed the idea to compare a fingerprint found on it to other paintings by Turner. His idea to use fingerprint analysis added a scientific approach to art authentication, a field that had been traditionally subjective.

Biro built his career on the analysis of fingerprints. He operated on the premise that artists may leave their fingerprints on a work of art either intentionally or inadvertently while painting. Biro used high-resolution digital photography and advanced imaging to detect latent fingerprints. He then would compare any found prints to known fingerprints of the artists in question. The assumption is that a match could strongly suggest the artist's direct involvement with the painting.

== Career ==
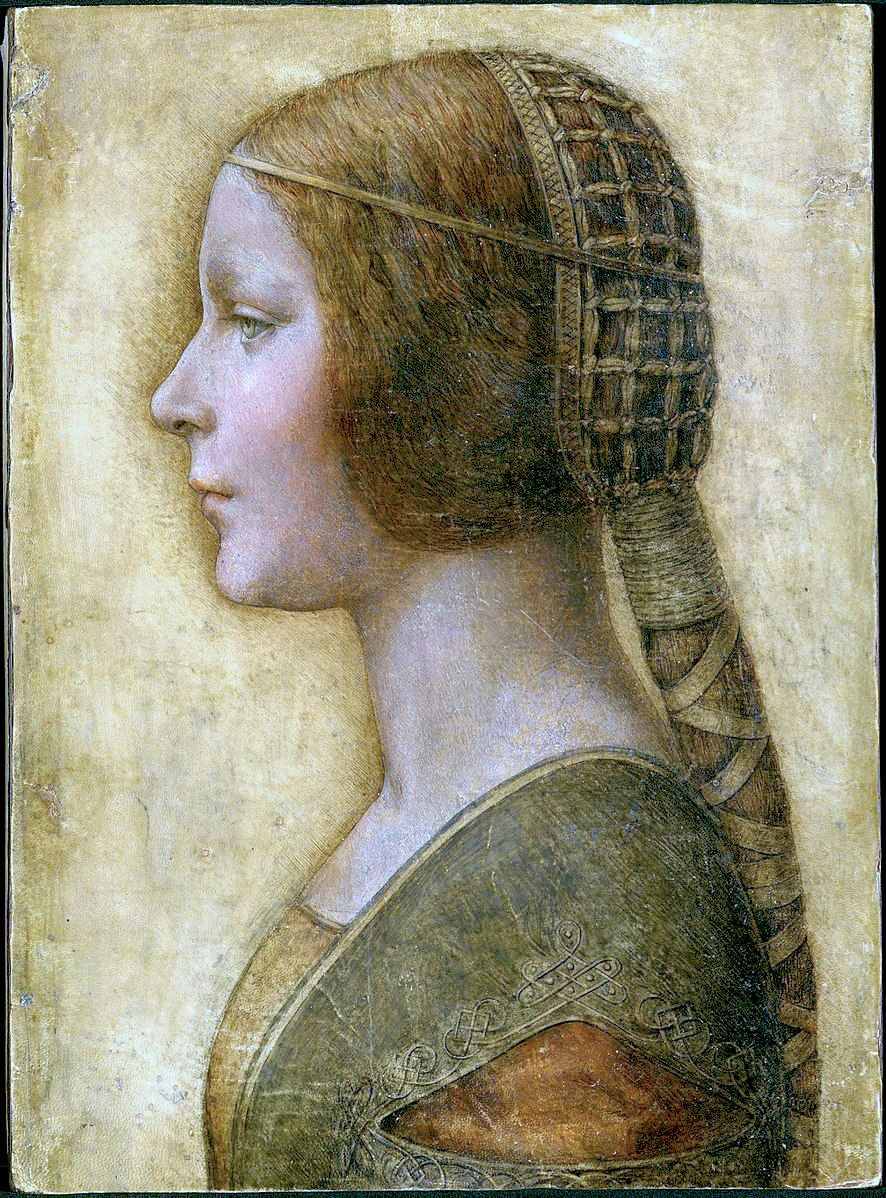
The painting La Bella Principessa on which Biro performed a fingerprint analysis.

Biro gained public attention in 2006 through his involvement in the authentication of a painting that he suspected was done by Jackson Pollock. The artwork was purchased at a thrift store by Teri Horton, a former truck driver, who was unaware that it may have been painted by Pollock. Biro performed a fingerprint analysis on the painting and determined that it matched a known fingerprint from Pollock. This finding led Biro to state that the painting was an authentic Pollock. These events were captured in the 2006 documentary "Who the #$&% Is Jackson Pollock?". In the film, Biro explains the forensic techniques that he used to determine that the painting was a genuine work by Pollock. Biro's findings were later called into question by journalist David Grann, who speculated that the print on the canvas was planted using a stamp from a fingerprint on a paint can that came from Pollock's studio.

In 2009, Biro conducted a fingerprint analysis on the artwork known as the La Bella Principessa. The painting was originally thought to be a 19th-century German painting, but art historians, including Martin Kemp, suspected that it might be a work by Leonardo da Vinci. Biro was consulted to examine the painting. He reported finding a fingerprint on the La Bella Principessa that matched on another of Da Vinci's paintings, the Saint Jerome in the Wilderness. Biro's discovery of the fingerprint held the potential to substantially increase the value of the painting. One art dealer speculated that the painting could be worth over $150 million if historians could achieve consensus that da Vinci painted it. The legitimacy of this fingerprint identification was later challenged by several fingerprint experts.

== The New Yorker article and Lawsuit ==
The New Yorker published an article in 2010 called "The Mark of a Masterpiece" that centered on Biro's methods. The author of the article, David Grann, raised questions about the legitimacy of Biro's professional background, methods, and findings. Biro had come under scrutiny in the 1980s for allegedly selling forged artworks. He sold two paintings that were purportedly by the Canadian artist Goodridge Roberts. The buyer later sought Biro's help in verifying the authenticity of the painting, but Biro would not disclose where he obtained them. Moreover, Roberts' widow and other art experts disputed the authenticity of the paintings. The buyer sued Biro for fraud and he was found liable. In other lawsuits in the 1980s, Biro was found liable for duplicating and altering artworks. Grann's article also questioned the legitimacy of Biro's unconventional techniques for finding fingerprints on artworks. For example, some fingerprints on artworks authenticated by Biro appeared too recent to be genuine. Fingerprint experts consulted by Grann suggested that some fingerprints identified by Biro might have been planted using a cast.

Biro filed a defamation lawsuit against the magazine and Grann that sought $2 million in damages. Biro maintained that the article caused damage to his reputation and health by insinuating that he fabricated fingerprints on artwork. He expanded his lawsuit to include several other publications that portrayed him negatively. In response, many news sites retracted their statements or issued corrections. Biro's lawsuit was not successful. The US Court of Appeals for the second circuit dismissed Biro's complaint on the grounds that he failed to demonstrate sufficient facts to support a plausible inference of actual malice in the publication of the article. This ruling also dismissed Biro's lawsuits against several other publications that had publicized the original story from The New Yorker.
