= István Biró =

Serbian politician

István Biró (Serbian Cyrillic: Иштван Биро, romanized: Ištvan Biro; born 25 September 1951) is a politician in Serbia. He served in the Assembly of Vojvodina from 2008 to 2016 as a member of the Democratic Party (Demokratska stranka, DS). He is now a member of the People's Party (Narodna stranka, NS).

== Private career ==
Biró is from Mali Iđoš, Vojvodina. He is a medical doctor and has worked as a general practitioner.

== Politician ==
Biró ran for mayor of Mali Iđoš in the 2004 Serbian local elections, appearing as the joint candidate of the Social Democratic Party (Socijaldemokratska partija, SDP) and the Reformists of Vojvodina (Reformisti Vojvodine, RV). He was defeated in the first round of voting.

He later joined the DS and was elected for the Mali Iđoš constituency seat in the 2008 Vojvodina provincial election. The DS and its allies won a majority victory, and Biró served as a supporter of the administration. He also appeared in the second position on the DS's electoral list for the Mali Iđoš municipal assembly in the concurrent 2008 local elections and was given a mandate after the list won seven seats, placing second against the Hungarian Coalition.

In 2009, he was appointed to the program committee of Radio Television of Vojvodina.

Biró was re-elected to the Vojvodina assembly in the 2012 provincial election. The DS and its allies won a plurality victory and formed a coalition government, and Biró again served as a government supporter for the next four years. Vojvodina adopted a system of full proportional representation for the 2016 provincial election, and Biró appeared in the eighty-third position on the DS's list; the list won only ten mandates, and he was not returned for a third term.

He subsequently left the DS and, as of 2020, is the commissioner of the People's Party in Mali Iđoš.

== Electoral record ==
=== Provincial (Vojvodina) ===
2012 Vojvodina assembly election Mali Iđoš (constituency seat) - First and Second Rounds
Ištvan Biró (incumbent)	Choice for a Better Vojvodina–Bojan Pajtić (Affiliation: Democratic Party)	1,205	20.34	2,593	52.68
Balint Juhas	Alliance of Vojvodina Hungarians	1,514	25.56	2,329	47.32
Milorad Pejović	Citizens' Group: Municipality of Mali Iđoš	758	12.80		
Dejan Prnjat	Serbian Progressive Party	586	9.89		
Eržebet Šinković	Eržebet Šinković–United Regions of Serbia	574	9.69		
Obrad Bogdanović	Socialist Party of Serbia	483	8.15		
Nenad Stevović	Montenegrin Party	293	4.95		
Radmila Bigović	Serbian Radical Party	277	4.68		
Peter Mate	League of Social Democrats of Vojvodina–Nenad Čanak	233	3.93		
Total valid votes		5,923	100	4,922	100

2008 Vojvodina assembly election Mali Iđoš (constituency seat) - First and Second Rounds
Ištvan Biró	"For a European Vojvodina, Democratic Party–G17 Plus, Boris Tadić" (Affiliation: Democratic Party)	1,589	26.46	1,763	52.10
Šandor Halgato (incumbent)	Hungarian Coalition–István Pásztor	1,851	30.82	1,621	47.90
Predrag Lubarda	Coalition: Democratic Party of Serbia–New Serbia–Vojislav Koštunica (Affiliation: Democratic Party of Serbia)	997	16.60		
Stanko Bogetić	Socialist Party of Serbia (SPS)–Party of United Pensioners of Serbia (PUPS)	840	13.99		
Ibolja Bata	Liberal Democratic Party	414	6.89		
Anamarija Novakov	Together for Vojvodina–Nenad Čanak	315	5.24		
Total valid votes		6,006	100	3,384	100
Invalid ballots		360		132	
Total votes casts		6,366	59.77	3,516	33.01

=== Municipal (Mali Iđoš) ===
2004 Mali Iđoš municipal election Mayor of Mali Iđoš – Second Round Results
Ištvan Siđi (incumbent)	For a European Mali Iđoš – Coalition: Alliance of Vojvodina Hungarians (SVM) and Democratic Party (DS)	2,291	62.94
Veselin Vušurović	"Socialist Party of Serbia–Slobodan Milošević"	1,349	37.06
Dr. Ištvan Biró	Social Democratic Party–Reformists of Vojvodina	eliminated in the first round	
Goran Bulatović	Citizens' Group: Mali Iđoš, Lovćenac, Feketić	eliminated in the first round	
Dragan Kaluđerović Guto	Serbian Radical Party	eliminated in the first round	
Predrag Lubarda	Democratic Party of Serbia–Vojislav Koštunica	eliminated in the first round	
Slavko Rađenović	Social Democracy Dr. Vuk Obradović	eliminated in the first round	
Miodrag Strugar	Strength of Serbia Movement Bogoljub Karić	eliminated in the first round	
Mihalj Čordaš	G17 Plus	eliminated in the first round	
Total valid votes		3,640	100
