= Mihály Lombard de Szentábrahám =

Hungarian Unitarian bishop

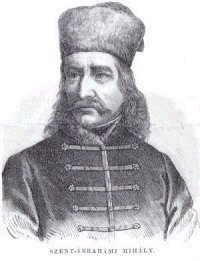
Mihály Lombard de Szentábrahám

Mihály Lombard de Szentábrahám (Városfalva, 1683 – Kolozsvár, March 30, 1758) was a Hungarian Unitarian bishop. He re-laid the foundations of the Unitarian Church in Transylvania during a period of harassment until the accession of Joseph II and the return of an era of tolerance.

During the period 1718-1720 the settlements were struck by famine and plague. He was preacher for the unitarian members at the Nagyszeben Committee. Here he got acquainted with Sámuel Homoródszentmártoni Bíró who initiated and funded his foreign trips from the spring of 1712. On 1 May 1713 he was the student of Leiden University. Later, from the 5th of November, 1714 he was enrolled at Odera-Frankfurt University learning philosophy and theology. He returned home on the 18th of August, 1715. First he was the tutor of the sons of Sámuel Homoródszentmártoni Bíró, later from the 27th of February the professor of the Kolozsvári Unitarian School. In 1720 he became director of the John Sigismund Unitarian Academy, at the time when the great-great grandson of Fausto Sozzini, Andrzej Wiszowaty Jr. was a teacher there.

== Works ==
- Summa Universae Theologiae Christianae secundum Unitarios published posthumously 1782
