= Andrew Biro =

Canadian academic

- Born: 1969 (age 56–57)

Academic background
- Education: University of Toronto (BA); York University (MA, PhD)
- Thesis: Denaturalizing Ecological Politics: 'Alienation from Nature' from Rousseau to Marcuse (2000)
- Doctoral advisor: Asher Horowitz
- Other advisors: Stephen Clarkson, Gordon Laxer

Academic work
- Discipline: Political science, Green politics
- Sub-discipline: Political theory, Environmental politics
- Institutions: Acadia University

Andrew Biro (born 1969) is a Canadian political theorist and scholar of green politics. He is a professor in the Department of Politics at Acadia University.

== Career ==
Biro graduated from the University of Toronto with a Bachelor of Arts in political science and history in 1991, and then from York University with a Master of Arts in political science in 1993. He went on to read for a PhD in political science from York, graduating in 2000. His thesis was entitled Denaturalizing Ecological Politics: 'Alienation from Nature' from Rousseau to Marcuse, and was supervised by Asher Horowitz. During and shortly after his graduate studies, Biro taught at both York and the University of Western Ontario, before coming to the University of Toronto as postdoctoral researcher from 2001 to 2002, where he was supervised by Stephen Clarkson and Gordon Laxer.

In 2002, Biro became an assistant professor and Canada Research Chair at Acadia University. In 2005, his Denaturalizing Ecological Politics: Alienation from Nature from Rousseau to the Frankfurt School and Beyond was published by University of Toronto Press. This was based ultimately on his PhD thesis. In the book, Biro addresses human relationships to nature by exploring the concept of alienation in the thought of Jean-Jacques Rousseau, Karl Marx, Theodor Adorno, and Herbert Marcuse.

Biro was promoted to associate professor in 2008. In 2011, he had visiting positions at the University of Sydney and Carleton University, and he published his edited collection Critical Ecologies: The Frankfurt School and Contemporary Environmental Crises with University of Toronto Press. The book explores connections between the Frankfurt School of critical theory and green politics. Biro was promoted to professor in 2014.

In 2023, Biro published his second monograph. Organizing Nature: Turning Canada’s Ecosystems into Resources was written with Alice Cohen and published by University of Toronto Press.
