= Katalin Bíró-Sey =

Hungarian numismatist

Katalin Bíró-Sey (11 May 1934 – 25 August 2022) was a Hungarian numismatist.

Spending her career as curator of the Ancient Coin Collection at the Hungarian National Museum, she was described as its most important organiser together with Lajos Huszár. From 1993 she spent the next ten years at the Ancient Coin Collection, Coin Cabinet, Museum of Cultural History in Oslo. For her service, she was selected as a member of the Norwegian Academy of Science and Letters in 1994.

Biró-Sey served as editor-in-chief of the Numizmatikai Közlöny, the journal of the Hungarian Numismatic Society. She mainly published in Hungarian, but published the book Bronzemünzen-Prägung im süclichen Transdanubien in 1984.
