= Štefan Biró =

Slovak footballer

Personal information
- Full name: Štefan Biró
- Date of birth: 12 April 1913
- Date of death: 14 March 1954 (aged 40)
- Position: Forward

Senior career*
Years	Team	Apps	(Gls)
1935–1936	SK Náchod		
1936–1939	SK Baťa Zlín		
1939–1944	ŠK Bratislava		

International career
1938	Czechoslovakia	1	(0)
1939–1942	Slovakia	8	(1)
- * Club domestic league appearances and goals

Štefan Biró (12 April 1913 – 14 March 1954) was a Slovak footballer who played as a forward and appeared for both the Czechoslovakia and Slovakia national teams.

== Career ==
Biró earned his first and only cap for Czechoslovakia on 3 April 1938 in the 1936–38 Central European International Cup against Switzerland, which finished as a 0–4 loss in Basel. He later represented the Slovakia national team, making his first appearance on 3 December 1939 in a friendly match against Germany, which finished as a 1–3 loss in Chemnitz. He was capped eight times for Slovakia, making his final appearance on 22 November 1942 in a friendly against Germany, in which he scored his only international goal. The match in Bratislava finished as a 2–5 loss.

== Personal life ==
Biró died on 14 March 1954 at the age of 40.

== Career statistics ==
=== International ===
Team	Year	Apps	Goals
Czechoslovakia	1938	1	0
Czechoslovakia	Total	1	0
Slovakia	1939	1	0
Slovakia	1941	3	0
Slovakia	1942	4	1
Slovakia	Total	8	1
Career total		9	1

=== International goals ===
No.	Date	Venue	Opponent	Score	Result	Competition
1	22 November 1942	Tehelné pole, Bratislava, Slovak Republic	Germany	2–3	2–5	Friendly
