= Unitarian Church of Transylvania =

Unitarian Christian denomination based in Cluj, Romania

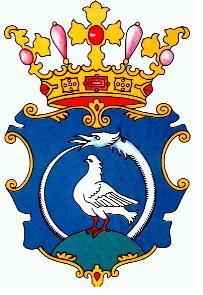
- Official insignia of the Unitarian Church of Transylvania
- Type: Nontrinitarian Christianity
- Classification: Radical Protestant
- Orientation: Biblical Unitarianism
- Theology: Summa Universae Theologiae Christianae secundum Unitarios
- Polity: Quasi-Episcopal
- Bishop: Rev. István Kovács
- Associations: International Council of Unitarians and Universalists, European Liberal Protestant Network
- Region: Romania, Hungary
- Language: Hungarian
- Headquarters: Unitarian Church, Cluj-Napoca, Romania
- Founder: Ferenc Dávid
- Origin: 1568
- Separated from: Hungarian Reformed Church
- Members: 60,000 in Romania; 25,000 in Hungary
- Places of worship: 125 in Romania; 12 in Hungary
- Secondary schools: 2
- Tertiary institutions: Protestant Theological Institute of Cluj
- Other name: Hungarian Unitarian Church
- Official website: www.unitarius.hu

The Unitarian Church of Transylvania (Hungarian: Erdélyi Unitárius Egyház; Romanian: Biserica Unitariană din Transilvania), also known as the Hungarian Unitarian Church (Hungarian: Magyar Unitárius Egyház; Romanian: Biserica Unitariană Maghiară), is a Nontrinitarian Christian denomination of the Unitarian tradition, based in the city of Cluj, Transylvania, Romania. Founded in 1568 in the Eastern Hungarian Kingdom by the Unitarian preacher and theologian Ferenc Dávid (c. 1520–1579), it is the oldest continuing Unitarian denomination in the world. It has a majority-Hungarian following, and is one of the 18 religious denominations given official recognition by the Government of Romania.

The Transylvanian and Hungarian Unitarians represent the only branch of Unitarianism not to have adopted a congregationalist polity, and remains quasi-episcopal; the Irish Non-subscribing Presbyterian Church, a distinct body closely related to Unitarianism, has a presbyterian structure. The Unitarian Church of Transylvania is administered by a bishop and two Curators-General, being divided into five Archpriestships. Since 2021, its bishop is the Rev. István Kovács. The Church, which uses Hungarian as the liturgical language, also endorses and teaches a catechism.

Together with the Calvinist Reformed Church and the two Lutheran churches of Romania (the Evangelical Lutheran Church and the Evangelical Church of Augustan Confession), the Unitarian community runs the Protestant Theological Institute of Cluj, wherein Unitarianism is represented by a distinct section. In addition, it has two high school-level theological educational institutions.

== Demographics ==
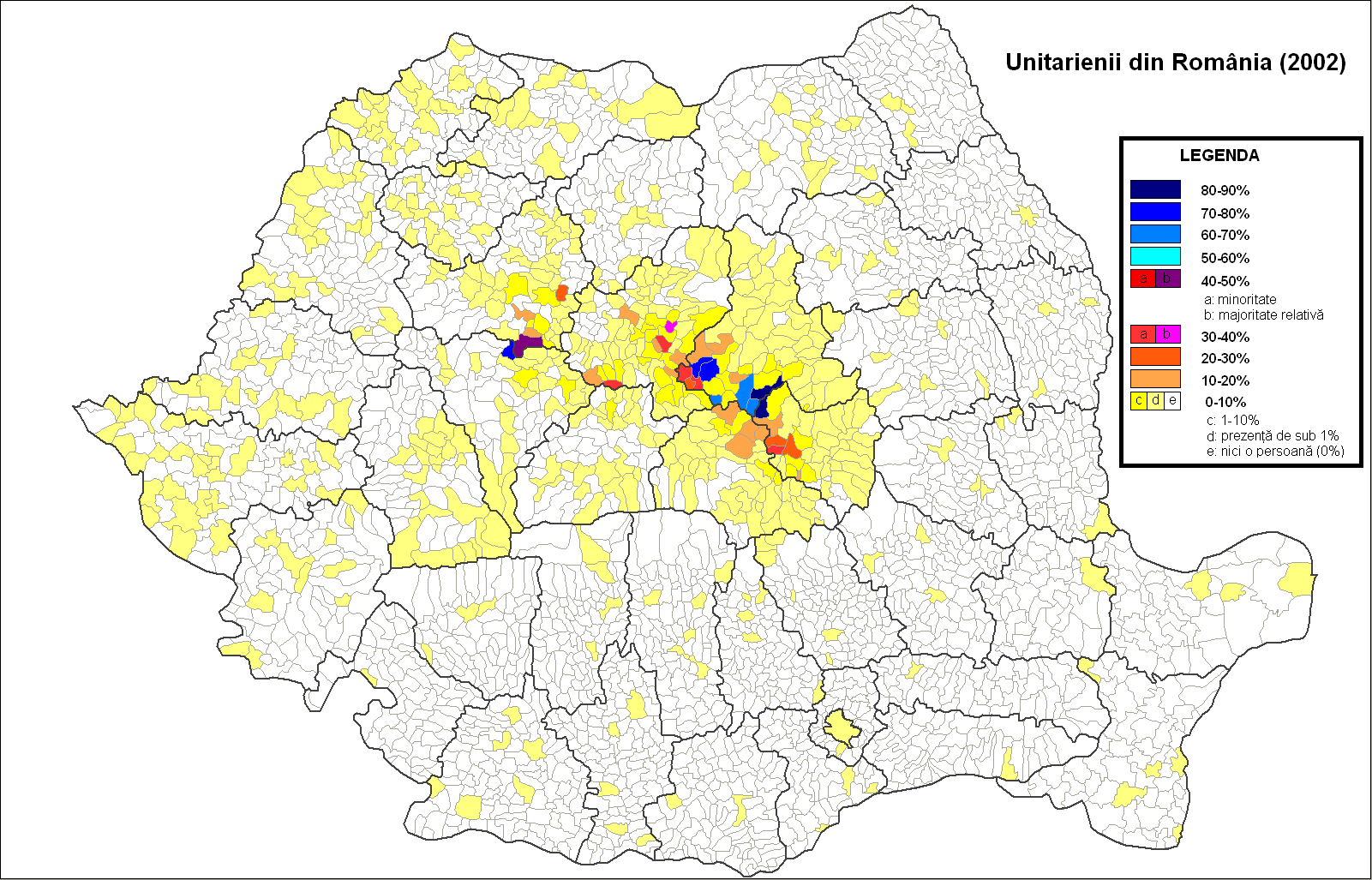
Unitarians in Romania (census 2002)

According to the results of the 2002 census, there are 66,846 Romanian citizens of the Unitarian faith (0.3% of the total population). Church officials place the number of believers at 80,000-100,000. Of the total Hungarian minority, Unitarians represent 4.55%, being the third denominational group after members of the Reformed Church in Romania (47.10%) and Roman Catholics (41.20%). Since 1700, the Unitarian Church has had 125 parishes — in 2006, there were 110 Unitarian priests and 141 places of worship in Romania.

The vast majority of church adherents live in Transylvania, mostly between Sighișoara (Segesvár) and Odorheiu Secuiesc (Székelyudvarhely), more or less around Dârjiu (Székelyderzs). The Unitarian church is especially strong in Dârjiu, Atid (Etéd), Cristuru Secuiesc (Székelykeresztúr), Feliceni (Felsőboldogfalva), Inlăceni (Énlaka), and Mugeni (Bögöz), where Unitarians make up a large majority of the population. All of these localities are situated in the southwestern corner of Harghita County, except for Sighișoara which is located immediately outside of that area in the Southeastern corner of Mureș County.

== History ==
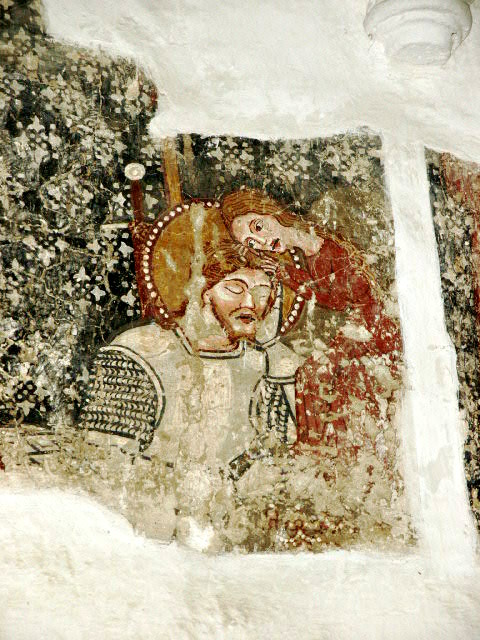
Pre-Unitarian fresco of the church in Dârjiu

The Unitarian Church was first recognized by the Edict of Torda, issued by the Transylvanian Diet under its Unitarian Prince John II Sigismund Zápolya (January 1568), and was first led by Ferenc Dávid (a former Calvinist bishop, who had begun preaching the new doctrine in 1566). Early on, the Unitarian Church had notable successes: it included 425 parishes, made use of the monumental St. Michael's Church in Cluj-Napoca, and attracted members of the eastern Transylvanian Székely community in large numbers.

The Church attracted suspicion from all other established religions, Roman Catholic as well as Protestant, with both camps deeming it heretical. After Dávid's imprisonment and 1579 death in custody, the institution entered a period of decline. The church in Transylvania received many refugees following the expulsion of the Socinian Polish Brethren from Poland on July 20, 1658, and maintained contact with the dispersed communities of Polish Brethren in the Netherlands and Lithuania. Andrzej Wiszowaty Jr., great-great-grandson of Fausto Sozzini, was one of the Polish exiles who taught at the Unitarian College in Cluj-Napoca, in the period in the 1730s when the church was reorganized and strengthened by Mihály Lombard de Szentábrahám, author of the church's official statement of faith, the Summa Universae Theologiae Christianae secundum Unitarios.

Following the Union of Transylvania with Romania at the end of World War I, Unitarian congregations were established in regions of the Old Kingdom: the first Unitarian church in Bucharest was founded in 1933 (its building was later demolished). During World War II, when Hungary ruled Northern Transylvania, the church, to prove its devotion to the official state ideology, engaged in anti-Semitic activity, despite having previously accepted many converts of Jewish origin.

American and British Unitarians became aware of the survival of the Unitarian Church in Transylvania following the visit of Alexander Farkas to Pennsylvania in 1831 and publication of his Account of the Unitarians of Transylvania, which was communicated in Latin to the Secretary of the British and Foreign Unitarian Association and published in The Unitarian advocate and religious miscellany in 1832. On 5 June 1899 the American Unitarian Association sent a letter to Bishop Jozsef Ferencz of the Transylvanian Unitarian Church inviting the leaders of the church to the first International Association for Religious Freedom (IARF) conference in 1900. With the exception of 1920, Transylvanian Unitarian leaders have been present at all IARF congresses, and, in May 1975, Communist authorities allowed it to welcome the IARF's executive committee in the city of Cluj-Napoca. In 1994, the IARF European Conference was held in the same location. The Transylvanian Unitarian Church is also a founding member of the International Council of Unitarians and Universalists.

In 2016, the deputy bishop announced his support for same-sex marriage. In 2018, the governing body of the church voted to only bless marriages recognized by the state, presently only heterosexual marriages, but did vote to allow individual members to express their own opinions on marriage.

== Worship ==
The Unitarian Church of Transylvania recognizes two 'sacraments,' Holy Communion and Baptism; Communion is viewed as symbolic and Baptism, also symbolic, represents belonging to the community.

== Churches ==
The locality of Dârjiu is home to a 13th-century fortified church, later reformed as Unitarian, which is on UNESCO's World Heritage List. Murals, dating back to the Roman Catholic period, show King Ladislaus I of Hungary's legend: Cumans broke into the Kingdom of Hungary; Duke Ladislaus, along with his cousin King Solomon, rode against them and freed a girl believed to be daughter of a Hungarian nobleman from a Cuman's hands. Further murals in the region are to be found at Unitarian churches in Mugeni, Crăciunel, and smaller ones in Rugănești and Cristuru Secuiesc.

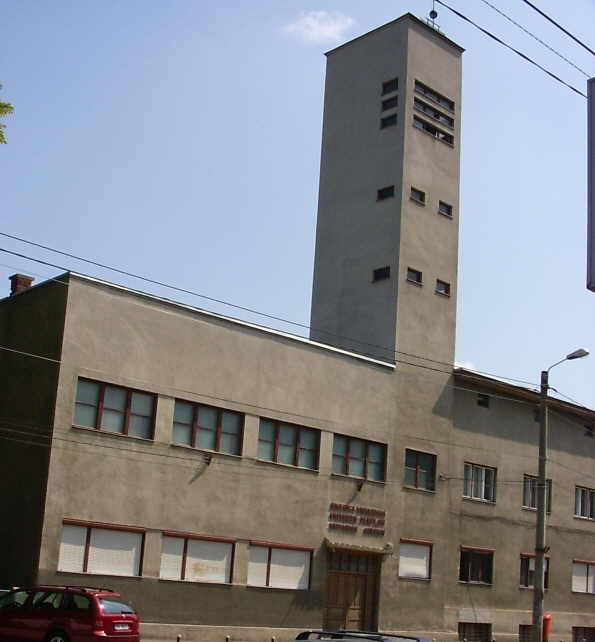
The Unitarian Church in Brașov

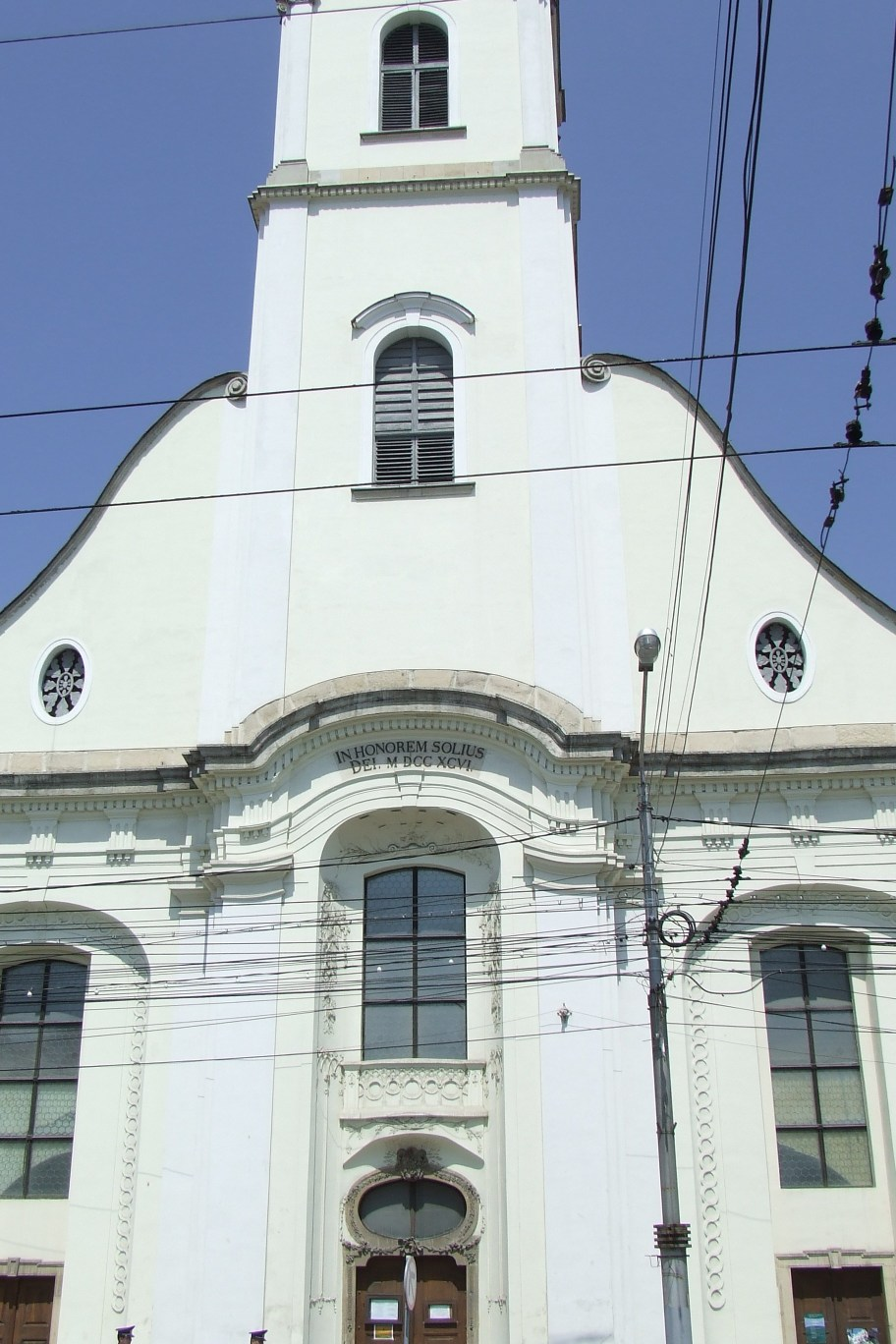
The Unitarian Church in Cluj-Napoca

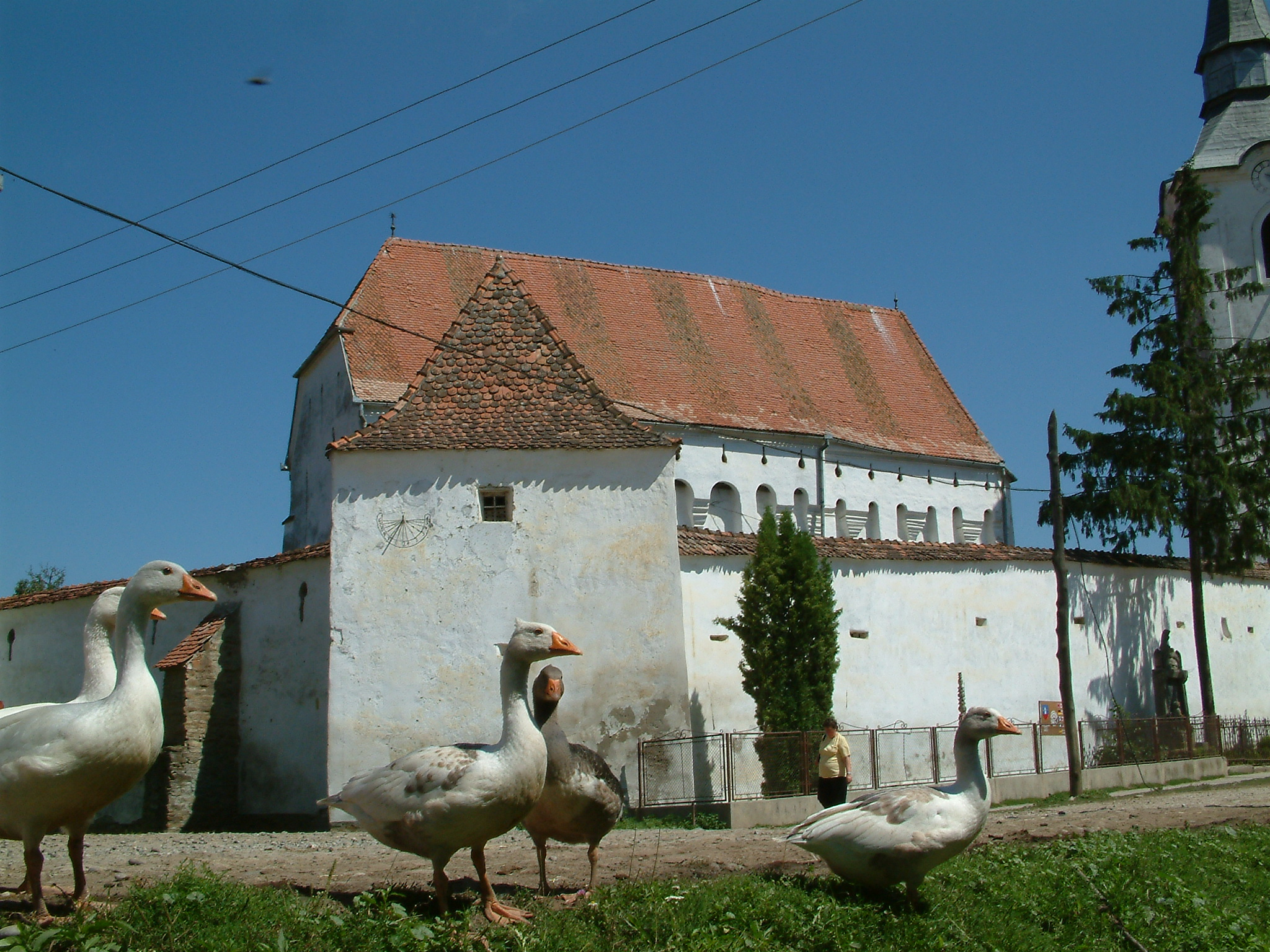
The Unitarian Church in Dârjiu

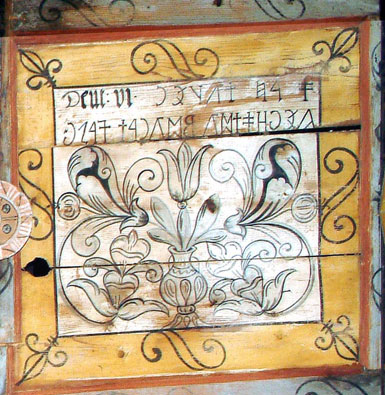
Ceiling of the Unitarian Church in Inlăceni, with a statement rendered in Old Hungarian script

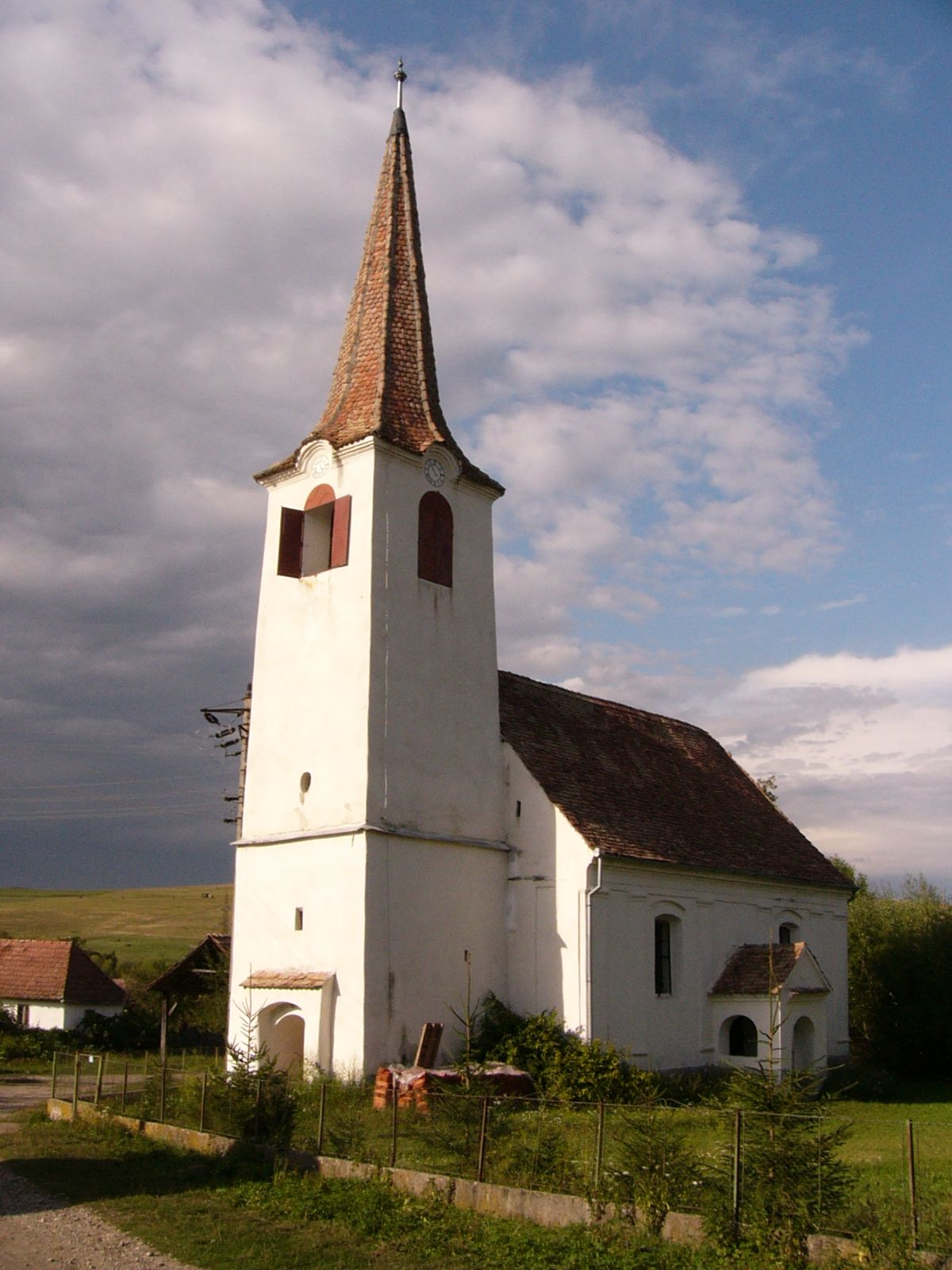
The Unitarian Church in Șimonești

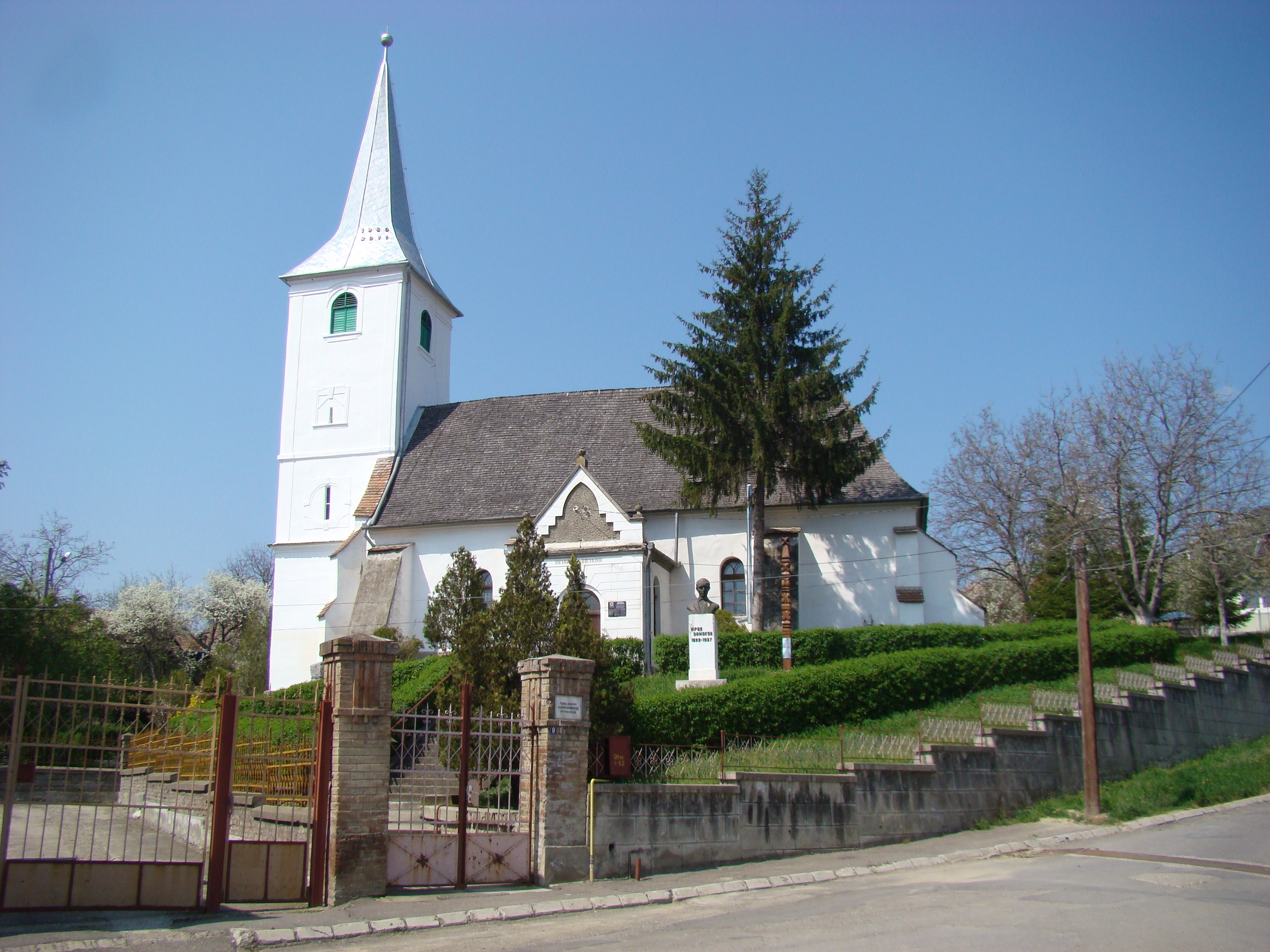
The Unitarian Church in Târnăveni

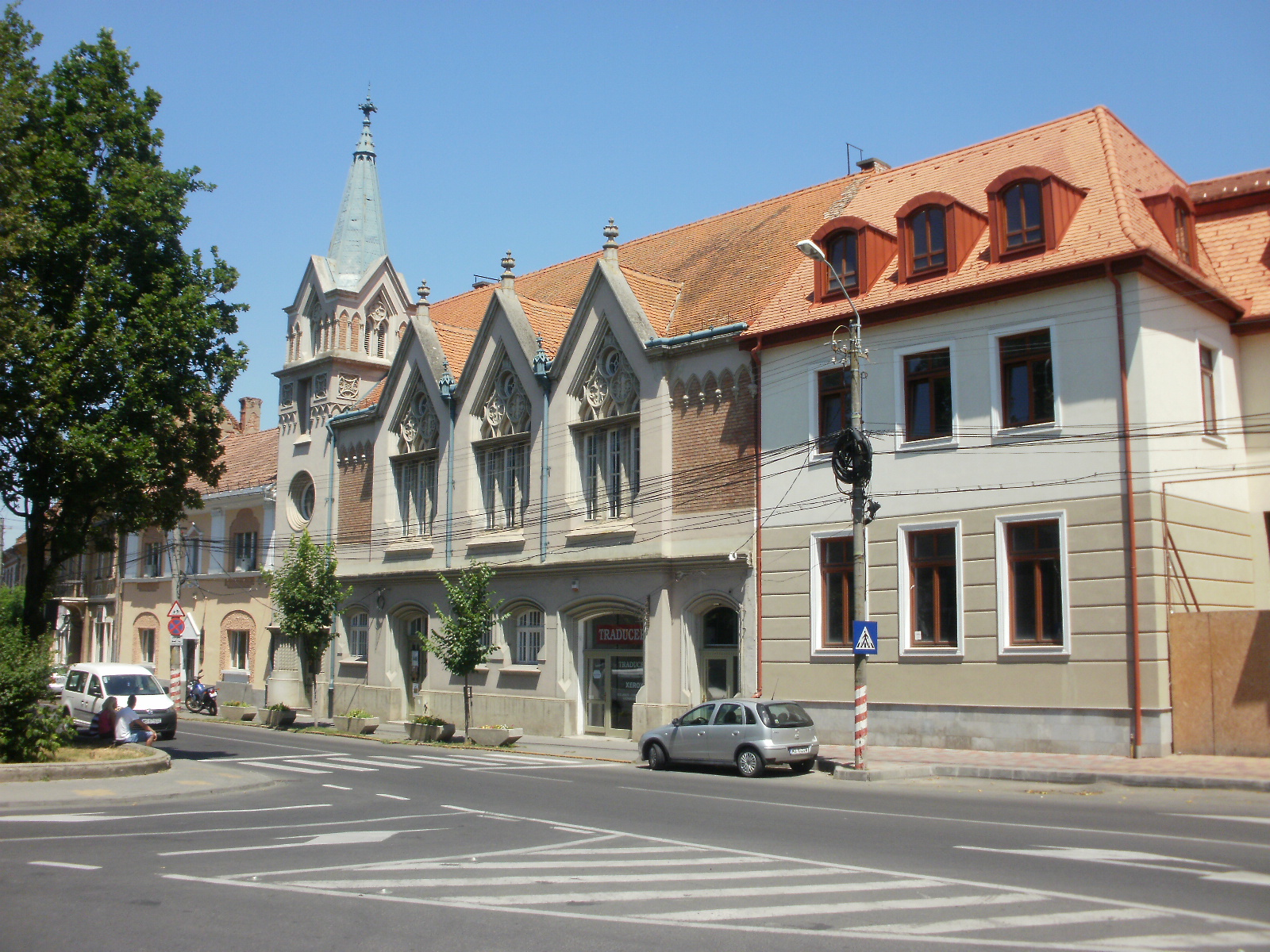
The Unitarian Church in Târgu Mureș

== See also ==
- John Sigismund Unitarian Academy
- Unitárius Hírnök
