= Saros =

Saros may refer to:

- Saros (astronomy), an 18-year period, across which lunar and solar eclipses repeat
- Saros (Nigeria), descendants of free slaves from Sierra Leone who migrated to Nigeria
- SS Saros, a shipwreck off the southeast coast of Australia
- SAROS, a wave-powered desalination technology
- Saros (video game)

== People ==
- Juuse Saros (born 1995), Finnish professional ice hockey goaltender for the Nashville Predators

== Places ==
- Botaş Saros FSRU Terminal, an LNG terminal in the Gulf of Saros, Turkey
- Saros (Greece), an ancient city-state in the Aegean Sea
- Saros (island), an island in the Aegean Sea
- Gulf of Saros, an inlet of the Aegean Sea
- Sáros county, a former division (vármegye) of the Kingdom of Hungary
- Šariš (Hungarian: Sáros), a historical region of Slovakia, encompassing the territory of the former Sáros county
- Șoarș (Hungarian: Sáros), Brașov County, a commune in Romania
- Șaroș pe Târnave, a village in Dumbrăveni town, Sibiu County, Romania
- Saroș, a tributary of the Bâsca in Covasna County, Romania
- Șaroș, a tributary of the Tisza in Maramureș County, Romania
- The ancient name of the Seyhan River, Turkey
