= Paltinu =

Paltinu may refer to:

== Villages ==
- Paltinu, in Negomir Commune, Gorj County, Romania
- Paltinu, in Vatra Moldoviței Commune, Suceava County, Romania

== Rivers ==
- Paltinu, a tributary of the Bâsca Mică in Buzău County, Romania
- Paltinu, a tributary of the Prahova in Prahova County, Romania

== See also ==
- Paltin (disambiguation)
- Păltiniș (disambiguation)
- Păltinișu (disambiguation)
