= Bâsca =

Bâsca Bâsca Roziliei
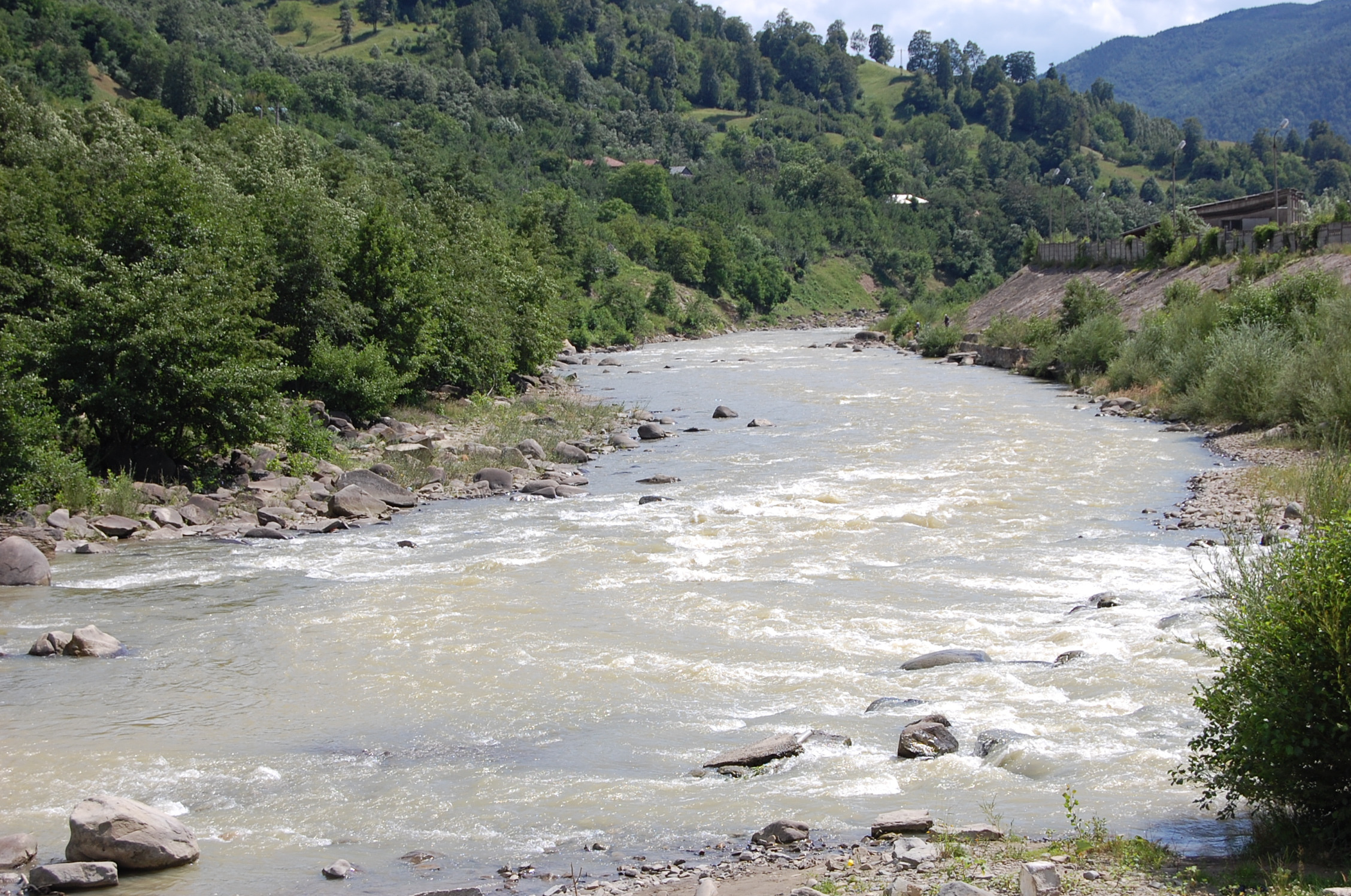
- The Bâsca near confluence with Buzău

- Location within Romania

Location
- Country: Romania
- Counties: Covasna, Buzău

Physical characteristics
- Source: Lăcăuți Peak
  - location: Vrancea Mountains
  - coordinates: 45°51′32″N 26°22′14″E
  - elevation: 1,500 m (4,900 ft)
- Mouth: Buzău
  - location: Upstream of Lunca Priporului
  - coordinates: 45°26′21″N 26°18′44″E
  - elevation: 385 m (1,263 ft)
- Length: 81 km (50 mi)
- Basin size: 785.1 km^{2} (303.1 sq mi)
- Discharge
  - location: Bâsca Roziliei hydrometric station,
  - average: 11.7 m^{3}/s (410 cu ft/s)
  - minimum: 1.72 m^{3}/s (61 cu ft/s)
  - maximum: 960 m^{3}/s (34,000 cu ft/s)

Basin features
- Progression: Buzău→ Siret→ Danube→ Black Sea
- Tributaries
  - left: Bâsculița, Bâsca Mică

The Bâsca, also known as Bâsca Mare in its upper course, and Bâsca Roziliei in its lower course, is a left tributary of the river Buzău, in Romania. It discharges into the Buzău near Nehoiu.

== Geographic position ==
Positioned in the external region of the curvature of Carpathians (subunit of Eastern Carpathians), the Bâsca drainage basin has an area of 783 km^{2} (302 sq mi). Its length is 76 km (47 mi). It lies at an average altitude of 1,081 m between the Lăcăuți Peak (1,777 m altitude) and the confluence with the Buzău River (385 m altitude).

== Geology ==
From the geological point of view, the Bâsca River Catchment overlaps the orogenic unit of the Eastern Carpathians, where the external Paleogene flysch is predominant, including: sandstones (Tarcău sandstones Facies), marl, conglomerates. This area is characterised by tectonic uplift and by severe seismicity related to the Vrancea Epicentral Area, being affected by deep-seated landslides (Ielenicz, 1984). Lithology is dominated by the presence of the hardest and hard rocks, covering 96.7% of the catchment surface.

== Climate ==
The climate of the Bâsca Catchment is temperate-continental. Föhn phenomena moderate the characteristics parameters of climatic elements, e.g. average multiannual atmospheric temperature between 1.2 °C at the Lăcăuți meteorological station between 1961 and 2000, see Table, and 2.4 °C at the Penteleu station (1988–2007), combined with precipitations of 664.3 mm at Penteleu and 830.1 mm at Lăcăuți.

Climate data for Lăcăuți Peak meteorological station (1961–2000)
Month	Jan	Feb	Mar	Apr	May	Jun	Jul	Aug	Sep	Oct	Nov	Dec	Year
Daily mean °C (°F)	−7.8 (18.0)	−7.7 (18.1)	−4.9 (23.2)	0.1 (32.2)	5.1 (41.2)	8.5 (47.3)	10.1 (50.2)	10 (50)	6.6 (43.9)	2.6 (36.7)	−2 (28)	−5.9 (21.4)	1.2 (34.2)
Average precipitation mm (inches)	37.9 (1.49)	39.9 (1.57)	42.1 (1.66)	56.6 (2.23)	102.2 (4.02)	130.2 (5.13)	124.3 (4.89)	109.1 (4.30)	68.0 (2.68)	40.9 (1.61)	37.8 (1.49)	41.1 (1.62)	830.1 (32.68)
Source: Clima României, 2008

== Hydrography ==
=== Major river tributaries ===
The following rivers are tributaries to the river Bâsca (from source to mouth):

– left: Țiganu, Delușor (Holom), Ghiurca Mare, Slobod, Pătac, Bâsculița, Izvorul Ascuns, Izvorul Stâncos, Cernat, Milei, Bâsca Mică, Varlaam, Tigva, Fulgeriș, Tainița, Gotiș, Hânsaru;
– right: Râșdaș, Reghin, Poplița, Saroș, Dârnăul Mic, Dârnăul Mare, Cireș, Ioviz, Surducul Mare, Cocean, Copăcelu, Piciorul Milei, Bratu, Tega, Păltiniș.

River	Catchment area (km^{2})	River length (km)
Bâsca Mică	238	46.5
Bâsculița	40	11.5
Poplița	34.2 (incl. Ruginosul)	9.3
Cireș	32.4 (incl. Corongoș)	11.1
Păltiniș	25.1	9.7
Ghiurca Mare	23.3	9.6
Dârnăul Mare	21.5	10.6
Delușor	20.9	6.9
Pătac	18.5	10
Giurgiu	16.2	6.5
Șapte Izvoare	15.6	6.6
Milei	15.8	6.4
Saroș	14.9	7.8
Corongoș	12.8	5.3
Brebu	11.1	6.6
Ruginosul	11.8	5.1
Cernat	11.1	6.7
Slobod	9.2	6.2

=== Reservoirs ===
On the Bâsca River the project "Hydropower Siriu – Surduc Development", has been developed (being now in construction stage). This project includes a permanent water reservoir "Cireșu" on the upper part of the Bâsca River and an underground derivation "Surduc – Nehoiașu", from Cireșu Accumulation and Bâsca River towards the "CHE Nehoiașu II" hydroelectric power station.

== Hydrology ==
The most common risk hydric phenomena affecting the catchment area are floods and flooding. Associated to these are processes of river channel dynamics, landslides and falls. The frequency analysis of the maximum monthly discharge indicates that the month with the highest flood potential is July, followed by June. In July were recorded the highest floods. Among them, remarkable for their socio-economic consequences where those from 1969, 1975, 2002. The annual maximum flow of the Bâsca River varied between 39.4 m³/s (year 1986) and 960 m³/s (year 1975, 2 Jul). Exceptionally floods were recorded in the years: 1975 (960 m³/s), 1969 (697 m³/s), 1991 (530 m³/s) and 1985 (515 m³/s). Multiannual average flow at this station is about 12 m³/s. Damaging effects caused by floods and flooding have determined property damage, such as flooded homes (e.g. on 20 July 2002, the Păltiniș inundated homes in the area of the confluence with the Bâsca), landslides and slope destabilization of versants; destruction of undermining and hydrotechnical works, affecting sections of the roads and humans casualties.

== Demographic and socio-economic features ==
- from a demographic point of view, the Bâsca River Catchment is situated in a human area with low density (8.35 inhabitants/km^{2}). In this catchment they are two communes: Comandău (1,042 inhabitants) and Gura Teghii (3,884 inhabitants) and two villages appertaining to the town of Nehoiu: Bâsca Roziliei (1,428 inhabitants) and Vinețișu (206 inhabitants);
- localities situated in the upper part: Comandău commune and lower part of the Bâsca River Catchment: Vadu Oii (on the Bâsca Mică), Varlaam (at confluence of the Bâsca or Bâsca Mare with the Bâsca Mică), Gura Teghii, Nemertea, Furtunești, Păltiniș and Bâsca Roziliei;
- the economical areas of activities of local it is focused on tree cutting from the forest and primary processed seasonal activity of pastoral and harvest of therapeutical herbs.

== Maps ==
- Harta Siriu – Trasee Montane
- geo-spatial.org, accessed 2010
