= Poplița =

- Location within Romania

Location
- Country: Romania
- Counties: Covasna County
- Villages: Comandău

Physical characteristics
- Source: Buzău Mountains Mount Lilișul Covasnei
  - coordinates: 45°49′06″N 26°16′19″E
  - elevation: 1,215 m (3,986 ft)
- Mouth: Bâsca
  - location: Comandău
  - coordinates: 45°45′19″N 26°16′16″E
  - elevation: 1,006 m (3,301 ft)

Basin features
- Progression: Bâsca→ Buzău→ Siret→ Danube→ Black Sea
- Tributaries
  - right: Mahoș, Ruginosul

The Poplița is a right tributary of the river Bâsca in Romania. It discharges into the Bâsca in Comandău. Its length is 9.3 km (5.8 mi) and its basin size is 34.2 km^{2} (13.2 sq mi) (including the Ruginosul basin).
