= Delușor =

Delușor Holom, Cuțan
- Location within Romania

Location
- Country: Romania
- Counties: Covasna County

Physical characteristics
- Source: Buzău Mountains
  - coordinates: 45°45′42″N 26°21′26″E
  - elevation: 1,309 m (4,295 ft)
- Mouth: Bâsca
  - coordinates: 45°46′09″N 26°17′35″E
  - elevation: 1,040 m (3,410 ft)
- Length: 6.9 km (4.3 mi)
- Basin size: 20.9 km^{2} (8.1 sq mi)

Basin features
- Progression: Bâsca→ Buzău→ Siret→ Danube→ Black Sea

The Delușor (also: Holom or Cuțan) is a left tributary of the river Bâsca in Romania. It flows into the Bâsca near Comandău. Its length is 6.9 km (4.3 mi) and its basin size is 20.9 km^{2} (8.1 sq mi).
