= Ghiurca Mare =

- Location within Romania

Location
- Country: Romania
- Counties: Covasna County

Physical characteristics
- Source: Mount Fagul Alb
  - location: Buzău Mountains
  - coordinates: 45°40′29″N 26°22′49″E
  - elevation: 1,384 m (4,541 ft)
- Mouth: Bâsca
  - location: Downstream of Comandău
  - coordinates: 45°42′33″N 26°18′15″E
  - elevation: 978 m (3,209 ft)
- Length: 9.6 km (6.0 mi)
- Basin size: 23.3 km^{2} (9.0 sq mi)

Basin features
- Progression: Bâsca→ Buzău→ Siret→ Danube→ Black Sea

The Ghiurca Mare is a left tributary of the river Bâsca in Romania. It discharges into the Bâsca near Comandău. Its length is 9.6 km (6.0 mi) and its basin size is 23.3 km^{2} (9.0 sq mi).
