= Păltiniș (disambiguation) =

Păltiniș is a mountain resort and village administered by Sibiu municipality, Sibiu County, Romania.

Păltiniș may refer to several other places in Romania:

- Păltiniș, Botoșani, a commune in Botoșani County
- Păltiniș, Caraș-Severin, a commune in Caraș-Severin County
- Păltiniș, a village in Asău Commune, Bacău County
- Păltiniș, a village in Gura Teghii Commune, Buzău County
- Păltiniș, a village in Lupeni Commune, Harghita County
- Păltiniș, a village in Panaci Commune, Suceava County
- Păltiniș, a village in Băcești Commune, Vaslui County
- Păltiniș, a tributary of the Arieșul Mic in Alba County
- Păltiniș (Bâsca), a tributary of the Bâsca in Buzău County
- Păltiniș, a tributary of the Cernu in Bacău County
- Păltiniș, a tributary of the Cibin in Sibiu County

== See also ==
- Paltin (disambiguation)
- Păltinișu (disambiguation)
