= Dârnăul Mare =

- Location within Romania

Location
- Country: Romania
- Counties: Covasna County

Physical characteristics
- Source: Catanelor Ridge
  - location: Buzău Mountains
  - coordinates: 45°43′06″N 26°14′05″E
  - elevation: 1,049 m (3,442 ft)
- Mouth: Bâsca
  - coordinates: 45°40′41″N 26°15′04″E
  - elevation: 953 m (3,127 ft)
- Length: 10.6 km (6.6 mi)
- Basin size: 21.5 km^{2} (8.3 sq mi)

Basin features
- Progression: Bâsca→ Buzău→ Siret→ Danube→ Black Sea

The Dârnăul Mare is a right tributary of the river Bâsca in Romania. Its length is 10.6 km (6.6 mi) and its basin size is 21.5 km^{2} (8.3 sq mi).
