= Vrancea Mountains =

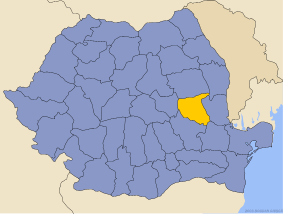
The mountain range lies mostly in Vrancea County

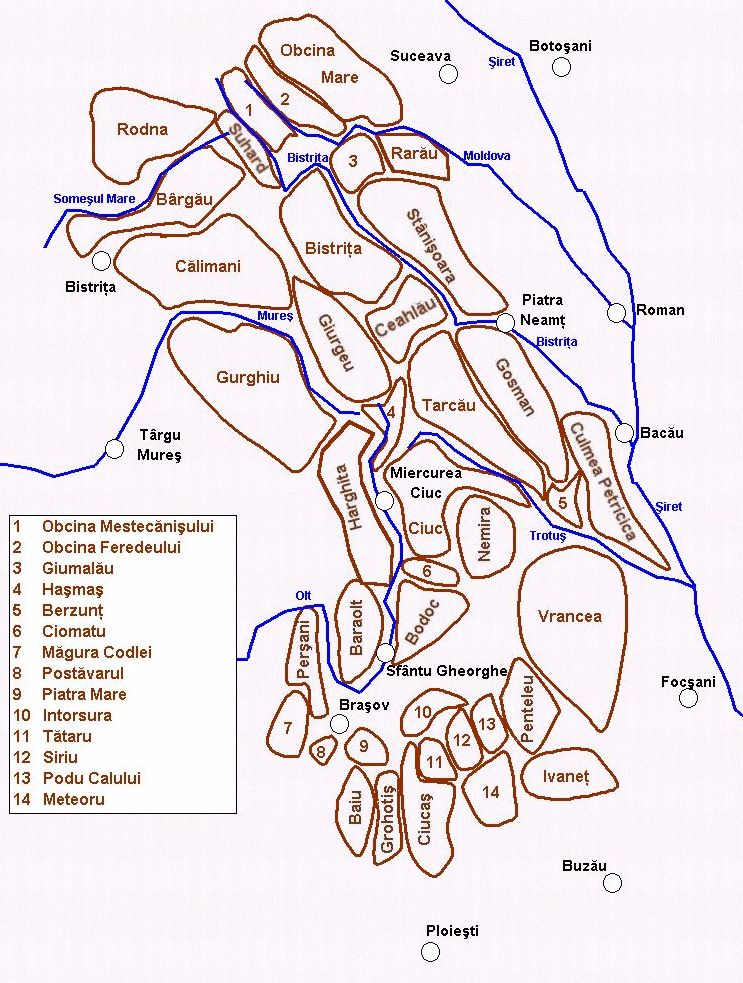
Map of the Eastern Carpathians, with the Vrancea Mountains towards the extreme southeast

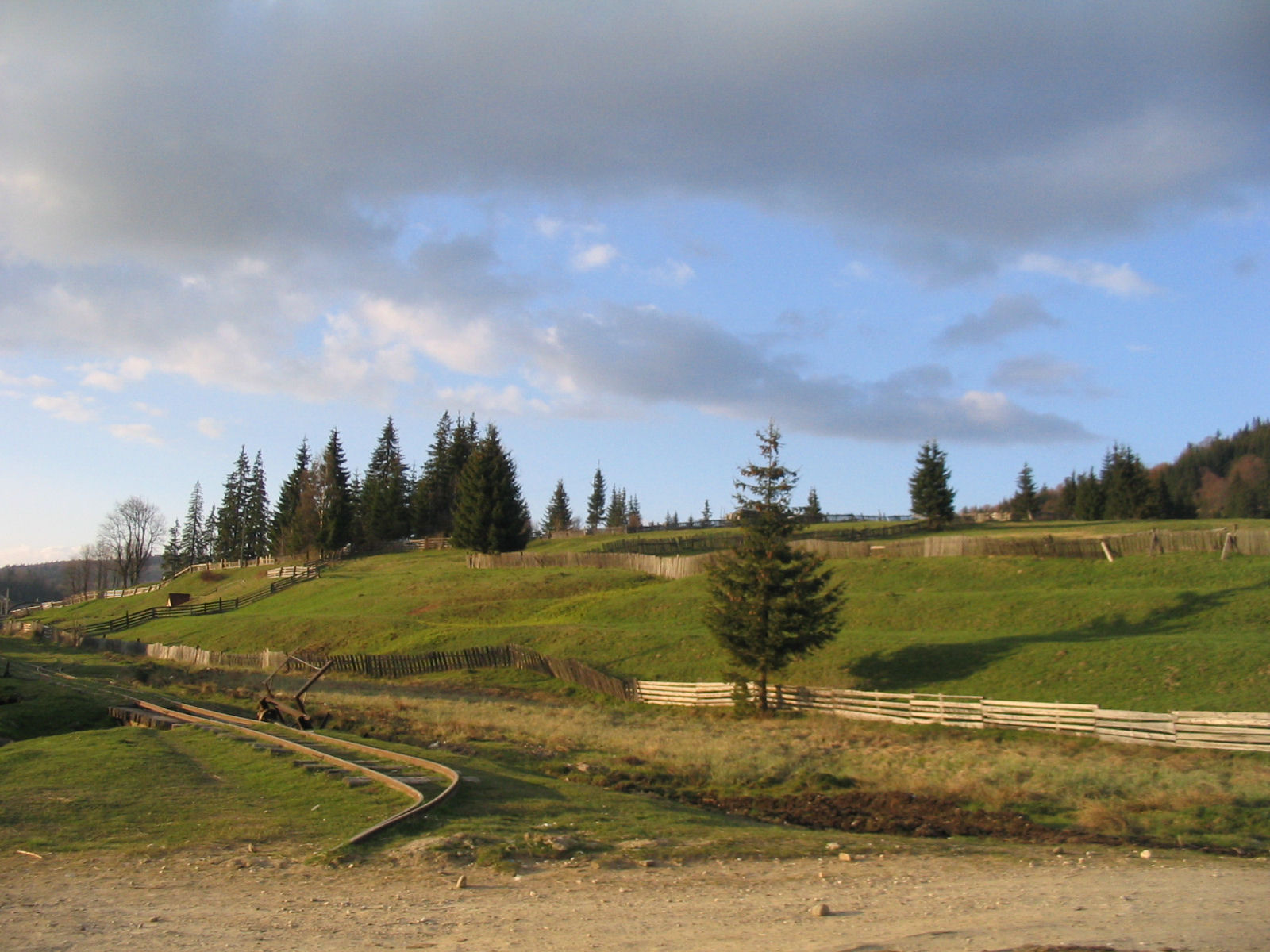
The foothills of the Vrancea Mountains, viewed from Comandău

The Vrancea Mountains (Romanian: Munții Vrancei) are a mountain range in the Curvature Carpathians in Romania. Located mostly in western Vrancea County, they also cover parts of Bacău, Buzău, and Covasna counties.

The highest peak is Goru Peak, at 1,784.6 metres (5,855 feet).

To the south are the Penteleu and Ivănețu Massifs (part of the Buzău Mountains), while to the north are the Tarcău Mountains, separated from the Vrancea Mountains by the Trotuș River.

The Vrancea Mountains are a habitat for a large number of animals, including brown bears, red foxes, deer, wild boars, Carpathian lynxes, stone martens, gray wolves, wild cats, and hares, as well as birds such as capercaillies, warblers, vultures, golden eagles, lesser spotted eagles, eagle-owls, tawny owls, long-eared owls, ravens, ring ouzels, black woodpeckers, green woodpeckers, and jays.

The 1977 Vrancea earthquake had its epicenter in these mountains.
