= Pătac =

- Location within Romania

Location
- Country: Romania
- Counties: Buzău County

Physical characteristics
- Source: Mount Dealul Bătrân
  - location: Buzău Mountains
  - coordinates: 45°39′46″N 26°20′57″E
  - elevation: 1,225 m (4,019 ft)
- Mouth: Bâsca
  - coordinates: 45°35′27″N 26°20′09″E
  - elevation: 835 m (2,740 ft)
- Length: 10 km (6.2 mi)
- Basin size: 18.5 km^{2} (7.1 sq mi)

Basin features
- Progression: Bâsca→ Buzău→ Siret→ Danube→ Black Sea
- Tributaries
  - right: Husăuș

The Pătac is a left tributary of the river Bâsca in Romania. Its length is 10 km (6.2 mi) and its basin size is 18.5 km^{2} (7.1 sq mi).
