= Viforâta =

Viforâta may refer to several places in Romania:

- Viforâta, a village in Berca Commune, Buzău County
- Viforâta, a village in Aninoasa Commune, Dâmboviţa County

== See also ==
- Viforâta River (disambiguation)
