= Cernat (Bâsca) =

- Location within Romania

Location
- Country: Romania
- Counties: Buzău County

Physical characteristics
- Source: Buzău Mountains
- Mouth: Bâsca
  - coordinates: 45.5485°N 26.3933°E
- Length: 6.7 km (4.2 mi)
- Basin size: 11.1 km^{2} (4.3 sq mi)

Basin features
- Progression: Bâsca→ Buzău→ Siret→ Danube→ Black Sea
- Tributaries
  - left: Vâna Mare, Pasărea
  - right: Pârâul Poienii

The Cernat is a left tributary of the river Bâsca in Romania. The length is 6.7 km (4.2 mi) and its basin size is 11.1 km^{2} (4.3 sq mi).
