= Cireș (Bâsca) =

- Location within Romania

Location
- Country: Romania
- Counties: Covasna County

Physical characteristics
- Source: Mount Tistaș
  - location: Buzău Mountains
  - coordinates: 45°42′12″N 26°10′44″E
  - elevation: 1,028 m (3,373 ft)
- Mouth: Bâsca
  - coordinates: 45°39′35″N 26°15′07″E
  - elevation: 947 m (3,107 ft)
- Length: 11.1 km (6.9 mi)
- Basin size: 32.4 km^{2} (12.5 sq mi)

Basin features
- Progression: Bâsca→ Buzău→ Siret→ Danube→ Black Sea
- Tributaries
  - right: Corongoș

The Cireș is a right tributary of the river Bâsca in Romania. Its length is 11.1 km (6.9 mi) and its basin size is 32.4 km^{2} (12.5 sq mi) (including the Corongoș basin).
