= Bâsculița =

- Location within Romania

Location
- Country: Romania
- Counties: Buzău County

Physical characteristics
- Source: Buzău Mountains
- Mouth: Bâsca
  - coordinates: 45°34′44″N 26°21′02″E
  - elevation: 809 m (2,654 ft)
- Length: 11.5 km (7.1 mi)
- Basin size: 40 km^{2} (15 sq mi)

Basin features
- Progression: Bâsca→ Buzău→ Siret→ Danube→ Black Sea

The Bâsculița is a left tributary of the river Bâsca in Romania. Its source is in the Buzău Mountains, at the foot of the peak Ciulianoș. Its length is 11.5 km (7.1 mi) and its basin size is 40 km^{2} (15 sq mi).

== Tributaries ==
The following rivers are tributaries to the river Bâsculița (from source to mouth):

- Left: Tămășoiu, Corâiu, Porcu, Tisa, Izvorul lui Comișel, Izvorul cu Ulii, Izvorul Calului
- Right: Izvorul Gropii
