= Slobod =

- Location within Romania

Location
- Country: Romania
- Counties: Covasna County

Physical characteristics
- Source: Buzău Mountains
- Mouth: Bâsca
  - coordinates: 45°41′26″N 26°16′44″E
  - elevation: 960 m (3,150 ft)
- Length: 6.2 km (3.9 mi)
- Basin size: 9.2 km^{2} (3.6 sq mi)

Basin features
- Progression: Bâsca→ Buzău→ Siret→ Danube→ Black Sea

The Slobod is a left tributary of the river Bâsca in Romania. Its length is 6.2 km (3.9 mi) and its basin size is 9.2 km^{2} (3.6 sq mi).
