= Fulgeriș River =

Fulgeriș River may refer to:

- Fulgeriș, a tributary of the Bâsca in Buzău County, Romania
- Fulgeriș River (Siret), Romania
