= Nehoiașu Hydro Power Plant =

- Interactive map of Nehoiașu Hydro Power Plant
- Country: Romania
- Location: Surduc, Buzău County
- Coordinates: 45.4427°N 26.3055°E

Reservoir
- Creates: Nehoiașu
- Total capacity: 0.5 million cubic metres (410 acre⋅ft)
- Surface area: 10 ha (25 acres)

Nehoiaşu Hydro Power Plant

Nehoiașu Hydro Power Plant is a large power plant on the Bâsca River situated in Romania. The project was started in 1998 and it was made up by the construction of a dam with 8 mobile segments each 12 m (39 ft) high, which will be equipped with two vertical turbines, the hydropower plant having an installed capacity of 152 MW. The power plant will generate 328 GWh of electricity per year.

== See also ==
- Iron Gate I Hydroelectric Power Station
- Iron Gate II Hydroelectric Power Station
