= Vadu Oii =

Vadu Oii may refer to several places in Romania:

- Vadu Oii, a village in Gura Teghii Commune, Buzău County
- Vadu Oii, a village administered by Hârșova town, Constanța County
