= Șapte Izvoare =

- Location within Romania

Location
- Country: Romania
- Counties: Buzău County

Physical characteristics
- Source: Mount Crucea Fetei
  - elevation: 1,505 m (4,938 ft)
- Mouth: Bâsca Mică
  - coordinates: 45°36′44″N 26°30′07″E
- Length: 6.6 km (4.1 mi)
- Basin size: 15.6 km^{2} (6.0 sq mi)

Basin features
- Progression: Bâsca Mică→ Bâsca→ Buzău→ Siret→ Danube→ Black Sea
- Tributaries
  - right: Trei Izvoare

The Șapte Izvoare is a right tributary of the river Bâsca Mică in Romania. It flows into the Bâsca Mică in the village Secuiu. Its length is 6.6 km (4.1 mi) and its basin size is 15.6 km^{2} (6.0 sq mi).
