= Milei (river) =

Milei Milea, Pârâul Milei
- Location within Romania

Location
- Country: Romania
- Counties: Buzău County

Physical characteristics
- Source: Buzău Mountains
- Mouth: Bâsca
  - coordinates: 45.5461°N 26.3991°E

Basin features
- Progression: Bâsca→ Buzău→ Siret→ Danube→ Black Sea
- Tributaries
  - right: Viforâta

The Milei (also: Milea or Pârâul Milei) is a left tributary of the river Bâsca in Romania. Its length is 6.4 km (4.0 mi) and its basin size is 15.8 km^{2} (6.1 sq mi).
