= Bâsca Mică =

- Location within Romania

Location
- Country: Romania
- Counties: Covasna, Buzău
- Villages: Secuiu

Physical characteristics
- Source: Buzău Mountains
- Mouth: Bâsca
  - location: Varlaam
  - coordinates: 45°30′52″N 26°26′32″E
  - elevation: 536 m (1,759 ft)
- Length: 46.5 km (28.9 mi)
- Basin size: 238 km^{2} (92 sq mi)

Basin features
- Progression: Bâsca→ Buzău→ Siret→ Danube→ Black Sea

The Bâsca Mică is a left tributary of the river Bâsca in Romania. It discharges into the Bâsca in Varlaam. Its length is 46.5 km (28.9 mi) and its basin size is 238 km^{2} (92 sq mi).

== Tributaries ==
The following rivers are tributaries to the river Bâsca Mică (from source to mouth):

- Left: Giurgiu, Harboca Mare, Mușa, Mușica, Gada, Secuiu, Izvorul Războiului, Bouțu
- Right: Manișca Mare, Bălescuțu, Bălescu Mare, Zănoaga, Pârâul Sărat, Șapte Izvoare, Ciuta Mare, Brebu, Pârâul Stânei, Paltinu, Neagra
