= Brebu (Bâsca) =

- Location within Romania

Location
- Country: Romania
- Counties: Buzău County

Physical characteristics
- Source: Mount Penteleu
  - elevation: 1,340 m (4,400 ft)
- Mouth: Bâsca Mică
  - coordinates: 45°34′39″N 26°30′40″E
  - elevation: 712 m (2,336 ft)
- Length: 6.6 km (4.1 mi)
- Basin size: 11.1 km^{2} (4.3 sq mi)

Basin features
- Progression: Bâsca Mică→ Bâsca→ Buzău→ Siret→ Danube→ Black Sea

The Brebu is a right tributary of the river Bâsca Mică in Romania. Its length is 6.6 km (4.1 mi) and its basin size is 11.1 km^{2} (4.3 sq mi).
