= Viforâta River =

Viforâta River can refer to one of the following rivers in Romania:

- Viforâta, a tributary of the Milei (river) in Buzău County
- Viforâta, a tributary of the Motnău in Vrancea County
