= Rumanite =

Rumanite is a rare variety of fossilized tree resin (amber), known for its deep reddish to brownish hues. It is found exclusively in Romania, particularly in the sandstone deposits of the Buzău River system near the village of Colți in Buzău County.

Rumanite was first classified by geologist Oscar Helm, to differentiate it from other types of amber.
