= Giurgiu (Bâsca Mică) =

- Location within Romania

Location
- Country: Romania
- Counties: Buzău County

Physical characteristics
- Source: Mount Giurgiu
  - elevation: 1,550 m (5,090 ft)
- Mouth: Bâsca Mică
  - coordinates: 45°44′11″N 26°23′08″E
  - elevation: 1,187 m (3,894 ft)
- Length: 6.5 km (4.0 mi)
- Basin size: 16.2 km^{2} (6.3 sq mi)

Basin features
- Progression: Bâsca Mică→ Bâsca→ Buzău→ Siret→ Danube→ Black Sea

The Giurgiu is a left tributary of the river Bâsca Mică in Romania. Its length is 6.5 km (4.0 mi) and its basin size is 16.2 km^{2} (6.3 sq mi).
