= Saroș =

- Location within Romania

Location
- Country: Romania
- Counties: Covasna County

Physical characteristics
- Source: Buzău Mountains, Mount Brusturuș
  - coordinates: 45°44′29″N 26°13′32″E
  - elevation: 1,177 m (3,862 ft)
- Mouth: Bâsca
  - coordinates: 45°42′23″N 26°17′12″E
  - elevation: 969 m (3,179 ft)
- Length: 7.8 km (4.8 mi)
- Basin size: 14.9 km^{2} (5.8 sq mi)

Basin features
- Progression: Bâsca→ Buzău→ Siret→ Danube→ Black Sea

The Saroș is a right tributary of the river Bâsca in Romania. Its length is 7.8 km (4.8 mi) and its basin size is 14.9 km^{2} (5.8 sq mi).
