= Paltin (disambiguation) =

Paltin may refer to:

- Paltin, a commune located in Vrancea County, Romania
- Paltin River
- Paltin, a village in Şinca Nouă Commune, Braşov County, Romania
- Paltin, a village in Boiţa Commune Sibiu County, Romania
- Paltin, a village in Brodina Commune Suceava County, Romania

== See also ==
- Paltinu (disambiguation)
- Păltiniș (disambiguation)
- Păltinișu (disambiguation)
