= Păltiniș (Bâsca) =

- Location within Romania

Location
- Country: Romania
- Counties: Buzău County

Physical characteristics
- Mouth: Bâsca
  - location: Păltiniș
  - coordinates: 45°27′18″N 26°22′28″E
  - elevation: 445 m (1,460 ft)
- Length: 9.7 km (6.0 mi)
- Basin size: 25.1 km^{2} (9.7 sq mi)

Basin features
- Progression: Bâsca→ Buzău→ Siret→ Danube→ Black Sea
- Tributaries
  - right: Păltinișul Mic

The Păltiniș (also: Păltinișul Mare) is a right tributary of the river Bâsca in Romania. It discharges into the Bâsca in the village Păltiniș. Its length is 9.7 km (6.0 mi) and its basin size is 25.1 km^{2} (9.7 sq mi).
