= Gura Teghii =

- Commune
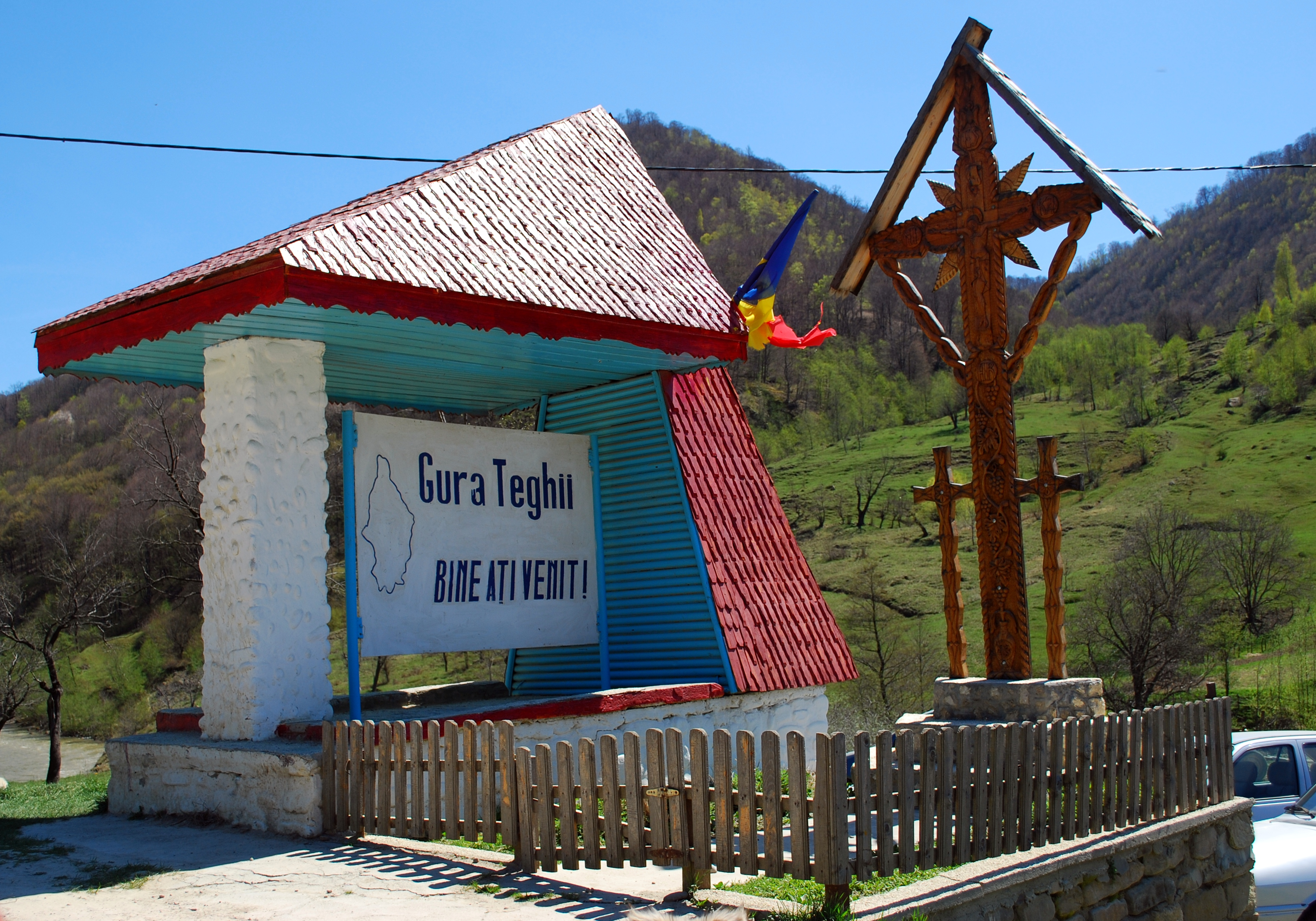
- Entrance sign in Gura Teghii

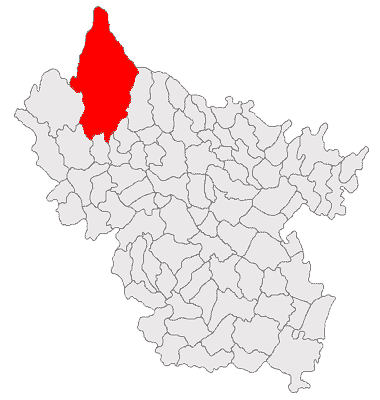
- Location in Buzău County

- Location in Romania
- Coordinates: 45°29′N 26°25′E
- Country: Romania
- County: Buzău
- Subdivisions: Furtunești, Gura Teghii, Nemertea, Păltiniș, Secuiu, Vadu Oii, Varlaam

Government
  - Mayor (2024–2028): Adrian Chirac (PSD)
- Area: 466.19 km^{2} (180.00 sq mi)
- Elevation: 521 m (1,709 ft)
- Highest elevation: 1,772 m (5,814 ft)
- Lowest elevation: 440 m (1,440 ft)
- Population (2021-12-01): 3,003
  - Density: 6.442/km^{2} (16.68/sq mi)
- Time zone: UTC+02:00 (EET)
  - Summer (DST): UTC+03:00 (EEST)
- Postal code: 127280
- Area code: +(40) 238
- Vehicle reg.: BZ
- Website: www.comunagurateghii.ro

Gura Teghii is a commune in Buzău County, Muntenia, Romania, located in the north-westernmost part of the county in its mountain region, near the limit of Covasna and Vrancea counties, in the Curvature Carpathians. Gura Teghii made up of seven mountain villages (Furtunești, Gura Teghii, Nemertea, Păltiniș, Secuiu, Vadu Oii, Varlaam) on the valley of the river Bâsca Roziliei and of its tributaries, Bâsca Mică and Bâsca Mare.

Mentioned in documents starting with the 16th century, these settlements were founded by the yeomen from Sibiciu area, who had owned those lands before they were taken over by wealthy boyar landowners. The locals have kept their old Wallachian traditions with Transylvanian influences well into the modern era. At first, they bred cattle, then they became coopers and carpenters passing their trade from generation to generation, while mostly illiterate. The first schools in the commune appeared towards the end of the 19th century, when a major lumber mill was opened in nearby Nehoiu. Skilled workers from Gura Teghii were hired in the lumber mill. While some landowners attempted to start businesses in tourism, but during the Communist era, this activity went into decline, being revigorated nowadays only by a few bed and breakfasts.

== Geography ==
The commune is the northernmost in Buzău county and occupies most of the Bâsca basin, and the basin of its tributary Bâsca Mică. The permanently inhabited regions are those in the southern low areas, whereas the commune territory extends into the mountains, covering the Penteleu Massif, with a maximum altitude of 1,772 metres (5,814 ft). Into the north-west, the communes limits are high on the Bâsca Mare valley, near the Szekler village of Comandău.

== History ==
The oldest document mentioning a village of this commune refers to Păltiniș, and dates back to 11 December 1534; it is a document from the chancellery of hospodar Vlad VII Vintilă, and also mentions the Tega brook, and a shipment of merchandise from the villages in the Buzău river valley towards Brașov.

Initially, the villages in the area were yeomen villages. The locals were working as lumberjacks and carpenters or hunters. In 1672, hospodar Radu Leon granted the land to the yeomen of Sibiciu. They took it as a common ownership and used it for shepherding, as in that area grasslands were insufficient. During the reign of Constantin Brâncoveanu (late 17th, early 18th century), the ownership of the Buzău mountains was clearly established: five people were owning the land up until the Austrian Empire's border. One of the owners was Costache Sibiceanu, former yeoman who became a boyar. During the phanariote period, a Wallachian of Greek origin, by the name of Enache Persescu, acquired the lands of the local peasants who could not prove their inheritance. In the meantime, they became serfs on the Bâsca-Gura Teghii estate, so they could not raise cattle, so they took on coopery, selling barrels and casks in the Buzău and Mizil market towns; the traditional trade was kept until the 1940s, but became lost due to industrialization—many locals were hired at the Göetz lumber mills in Nehoiu.

Historical population
| Year | Pop. | ±% |
|---|---|---|
| 2002 | 3,884 | — |
| 2011 | 3,439 | −11.5% |
| 2021 | 3,003 | −12.7% |
Source: Census data

== Notes ==
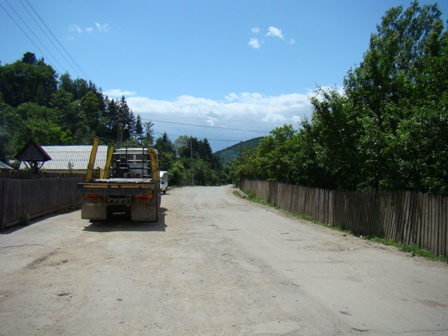
Street in Varlaam village
