= Păltinișu =

Păltinişu may refer to:

- Păltinișu, a village in Perieți Commune, Ialomița County, Romania
- Păltinișu, a village in Căzănești Commune, Mehedinți County, Romania

== See also ==
- Paltin (disambiguation)
- Păltiniș (disambiguation)
