= Geological resistance =

Property of minerals

Geological resistance is a measure of how well minerals resist erosive factors, and is based primarily on hardness, chemical reactivity and cohesion. The more hardness, less reactivity and more cohesion a mineral has, the less susceptible it is to erosion. Over time, differences in geological resistance in the same geological formation can lead to the formation of columns and arches, like those in Moab, Utah; and of bridges, like Utah's Rainbow Bridge.
