= Saria Island =

Island in Greece

Saria
Native name: Σαρία
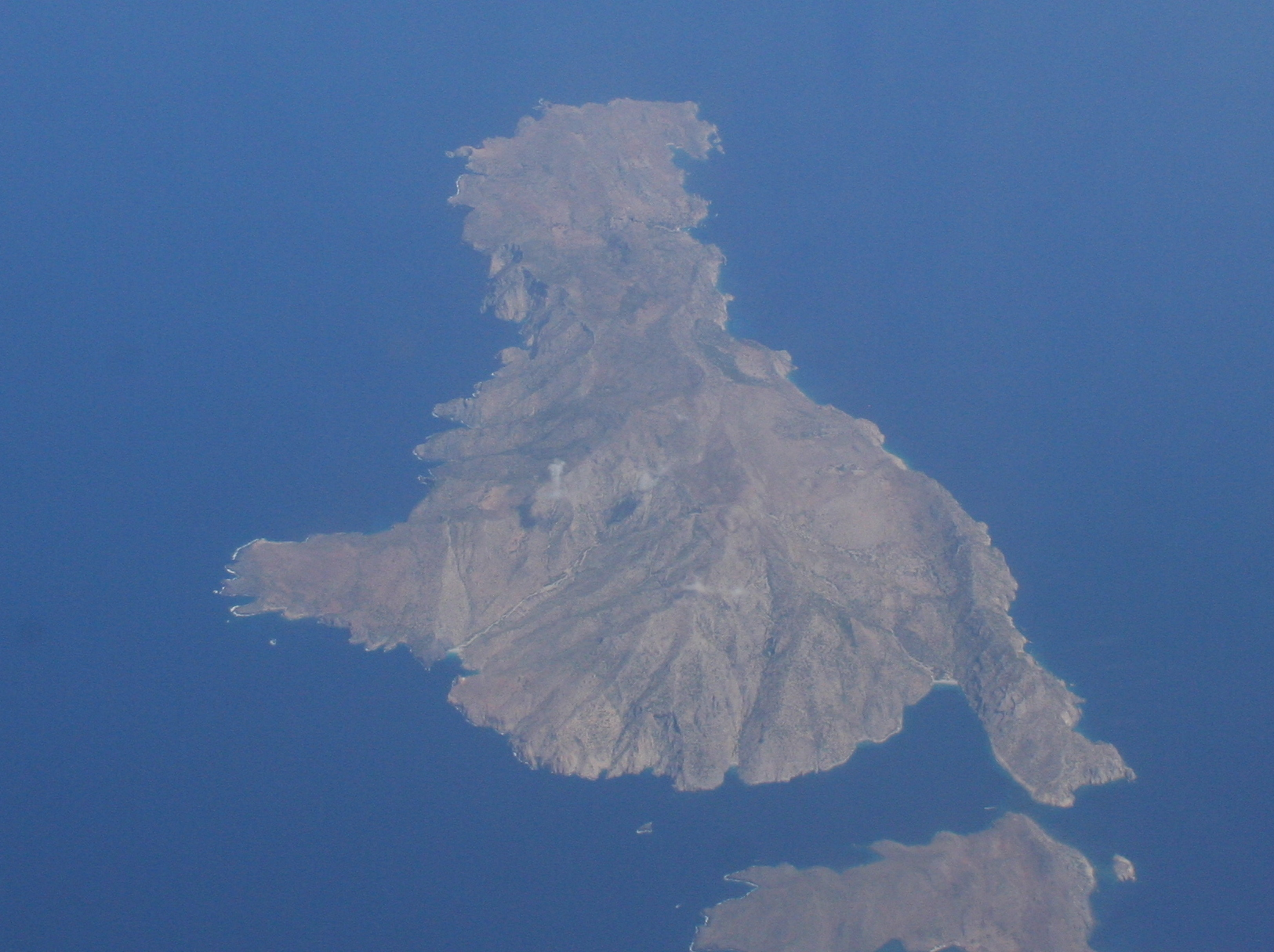

- Location within Greece

Geography
- Coordinates: 35.87°N 27.22°E
- Archipelago: Dodecanese
- Area: 20.429 km^{2} (7.888 sq mi)
- Highest elevation: 631 m (2070 ft)
- Highest point: Mt. Saria

Administration
- Greece
- Region: South Aegean
- Regional unit: Karpathos-Kasos
- Municipality: Karpathos
- Capital city: Argos

Demographics
- Population: 45 (2011)

Additional information
- Postal code: 857 00
- Area code: 22450
- Vehicle registration: ΚΧ, ΡΟ, ΡΚ

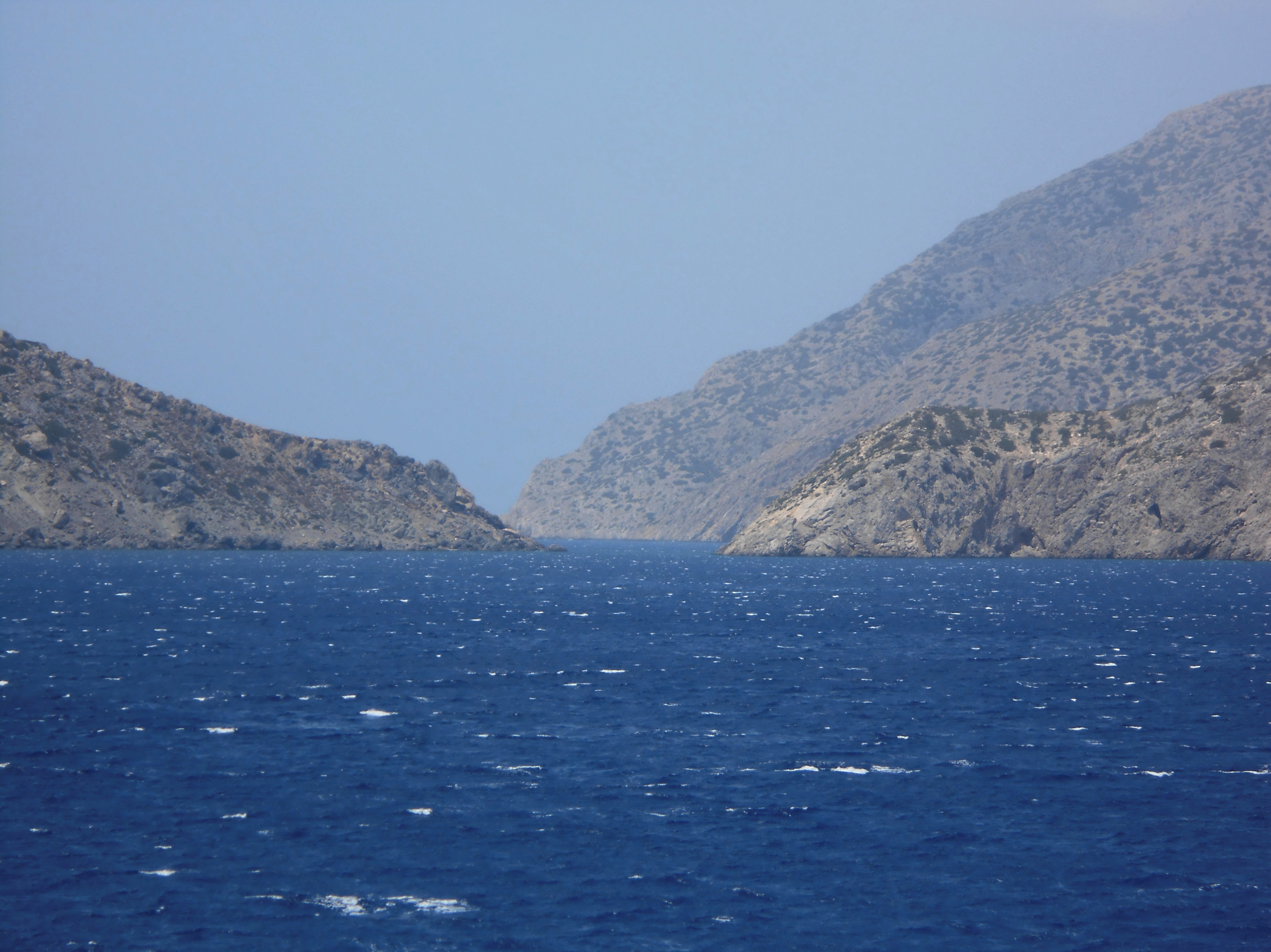
The Saria Strait

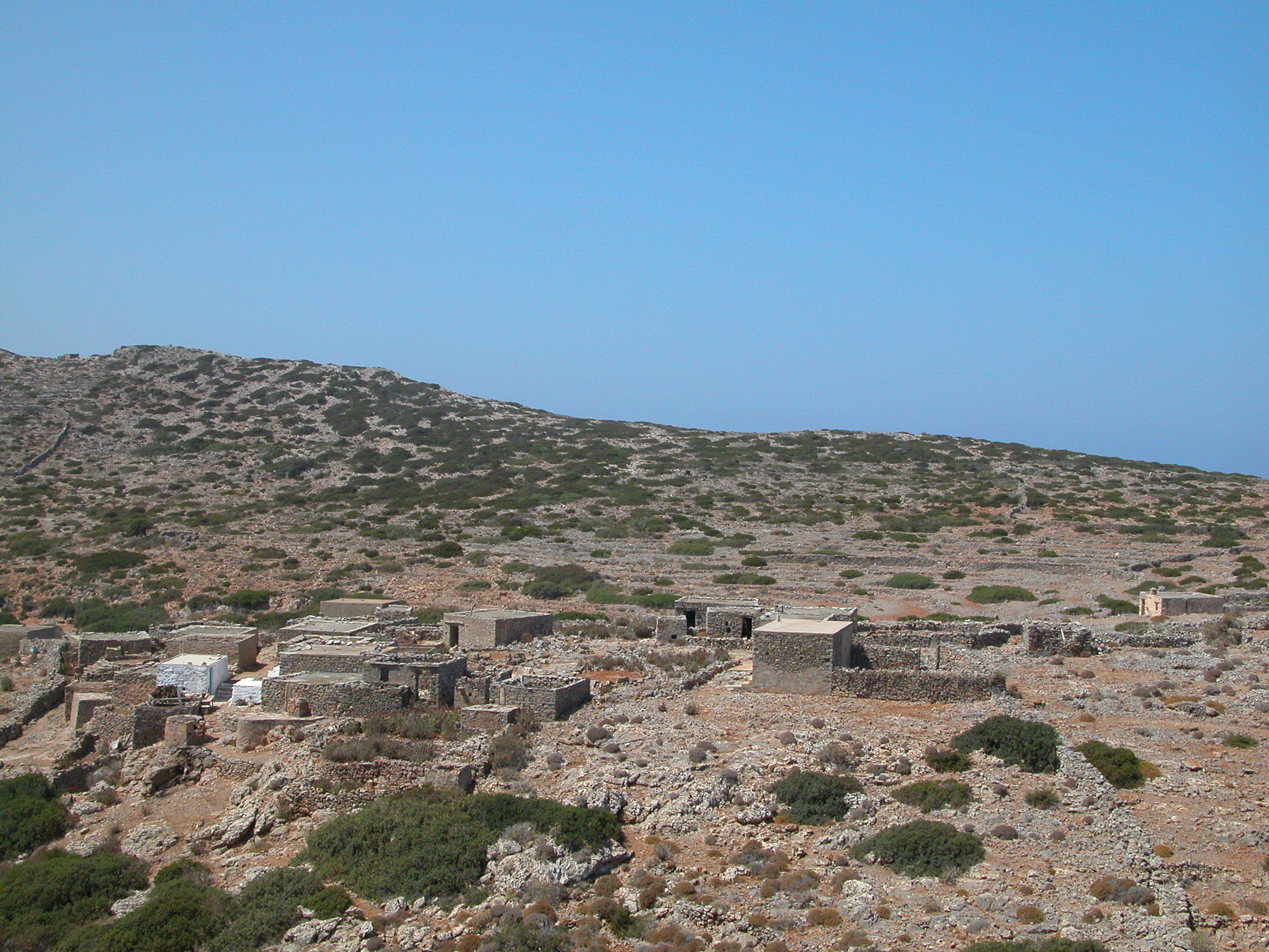
Argos, the seasonally inhabited traditional settlement on the island of Saria

Saria Island (Greek: Σαρία), anciently known as Sarus or Saros (Ancient Greek: Σάρος), is an island in Greece. It is a rocky, volcanic island just to the north of Karpathos, separated from it by a 100 m (330 ft) wide strait. It is part of the Dodecanese archipelago. In ancient times, a city-state called Saros was situated on the island. It was a member of the Delian League.

Administratively, it is part of the municipal unit of Olympos. The 2011 census reported a population of 45 residents. It has little plant or animal life, and has a number of steep cliffs. Although only shepherds live on Saria now, the ruins of the ancient city of Nisyros can be found here. It is also a breeding area for Eleonora's falcons.

Although the name is subject to dispute, scholars link it with the name of an ancient Greek princess named Katherine from a line of Saria royalty. Greek legends say she was as beautiful as Helen of Troy and so they named an island after her. On the island of Saria, it is recorded history that a kingdom existed named Mikri Nisyros.
