= Saros (Greece) =

Coordinates: 35°53′17″N 27°13′55″E

Saros or Sarus (Ancient Greek: Σάρος) was a city and polis (city-state) of ancient Greece on the island of the same name. It was a member of the Delian League.

Its site is located near modern Palatia.
