= Colți =

- Commune
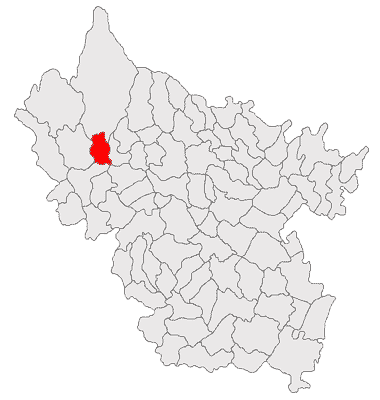
- Location in Buzău County

- Location in Romania
- Coordinates: 45°23′N 26°24′E
- Country: Romania
- County: Buzău
- Established: 1508 (first attested)
- Subdivisions: Aluniș, Colți, Colții de Jos, Muscelul Cărămănești

Government
  - Mayor (2020–2024): Gheorghe Ștefan (PMP)
- Area: 34.92 km^{2} (13.48 sq mi)
- Elevation: 406 m (1,332 ft)
- Population (2021-12-01): 809
  - Density: 23.2/km^{2} (60.0/sq mi)
- Time zone: EET/EEST (UTC+2/+3)
- Postal code: 127195–127198
- Area code: +(40) 238
- Vehicle reg.: BZ
- Website: comunacolti.ro

Colți (Romanian pronunciation: [kolt͡sʲ]) is a commune in Buzău County, Muntenia, Romania, located in the Pătârlagele hollow, at the curvature of the Carpathian Mountains, 13 km (8.1 mi) away from the town of Pătârlagele. It is composed of four villages: Aluniș, Colți, Colții de Jos, and Muscelu Cărămănești.

== Landmarks ==
=== The amber museum ===
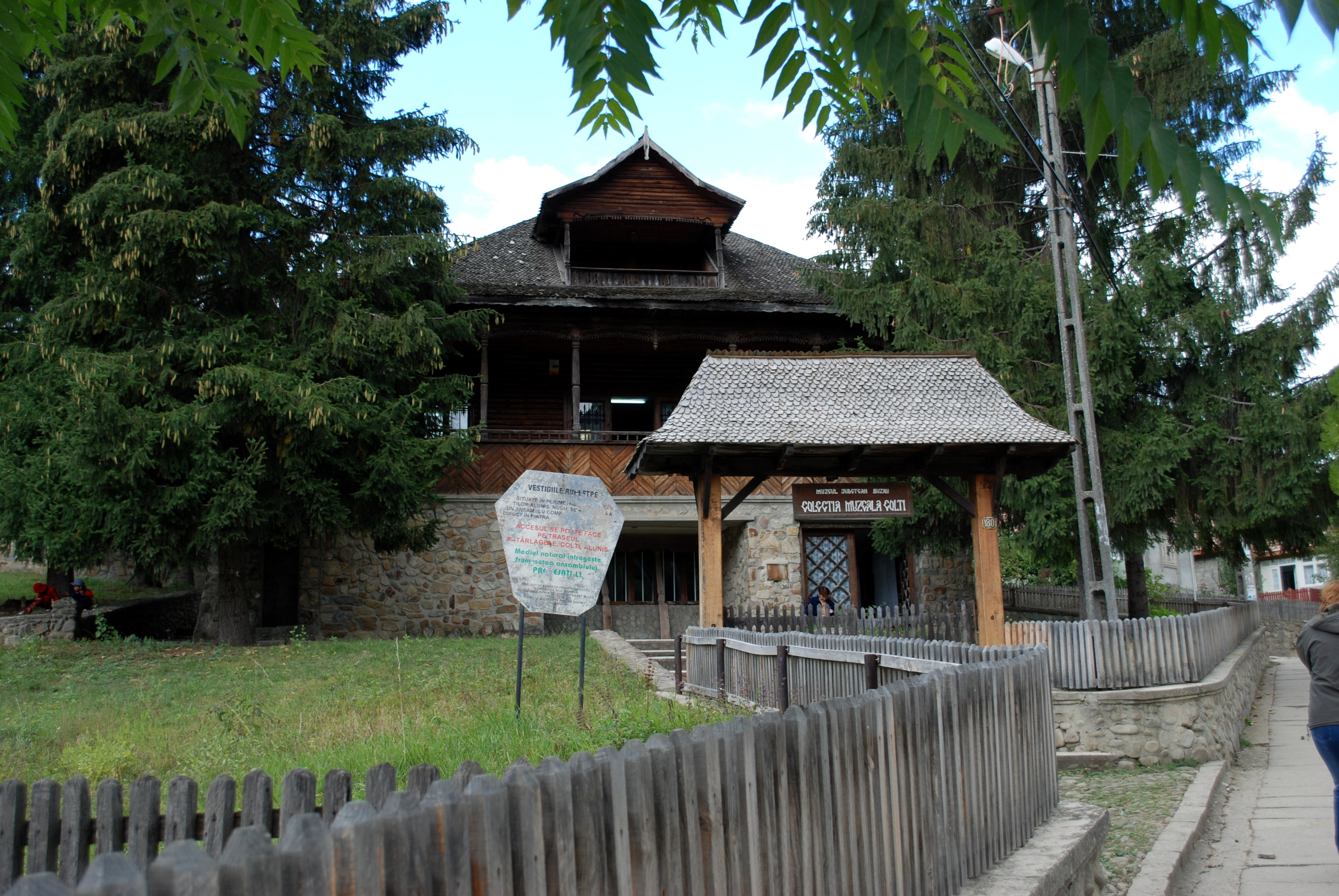
The Amber Museum in Colți

Colți is known for having been the only place in Romania where amber was extracted. The old amber mine has been closed since 1948, but the commune is the location of the only amber museum in Romania. The museum was opened in 1973 and exhibits pieces of amber and other minerals as well as deeds and documents that refer to amber mining.

The most important exhibits are some pieces of amber that weigh over 1.5 kilograms (3.3 lb), an earring with a piece of amber that preserves a 3-million-year-old ant, and another piece that kept the shape of the tree from whose resin it emerged.

Amber is a common ornament for the people of Colți, who wear amber pieces as good luck charms.

=== The Aluniș cave-church ===
6 km (3.7 mi) away from the commune's center lies the village of Aluniș, where medieval cave settlements can be found. A cave-church was dug in the sandstone in 1274, by local shepherds, and served as a monastery until 1871. Since then, it has served as the village Eastern Orthodox church.

Historical population
Year	Pop.	±%
2002	1,335	—
2011	1,094	−18.1%
2021	809	−26.1%
Source: Census data

== See also ==
- Rumanite
