= Nehoiu =

- Town
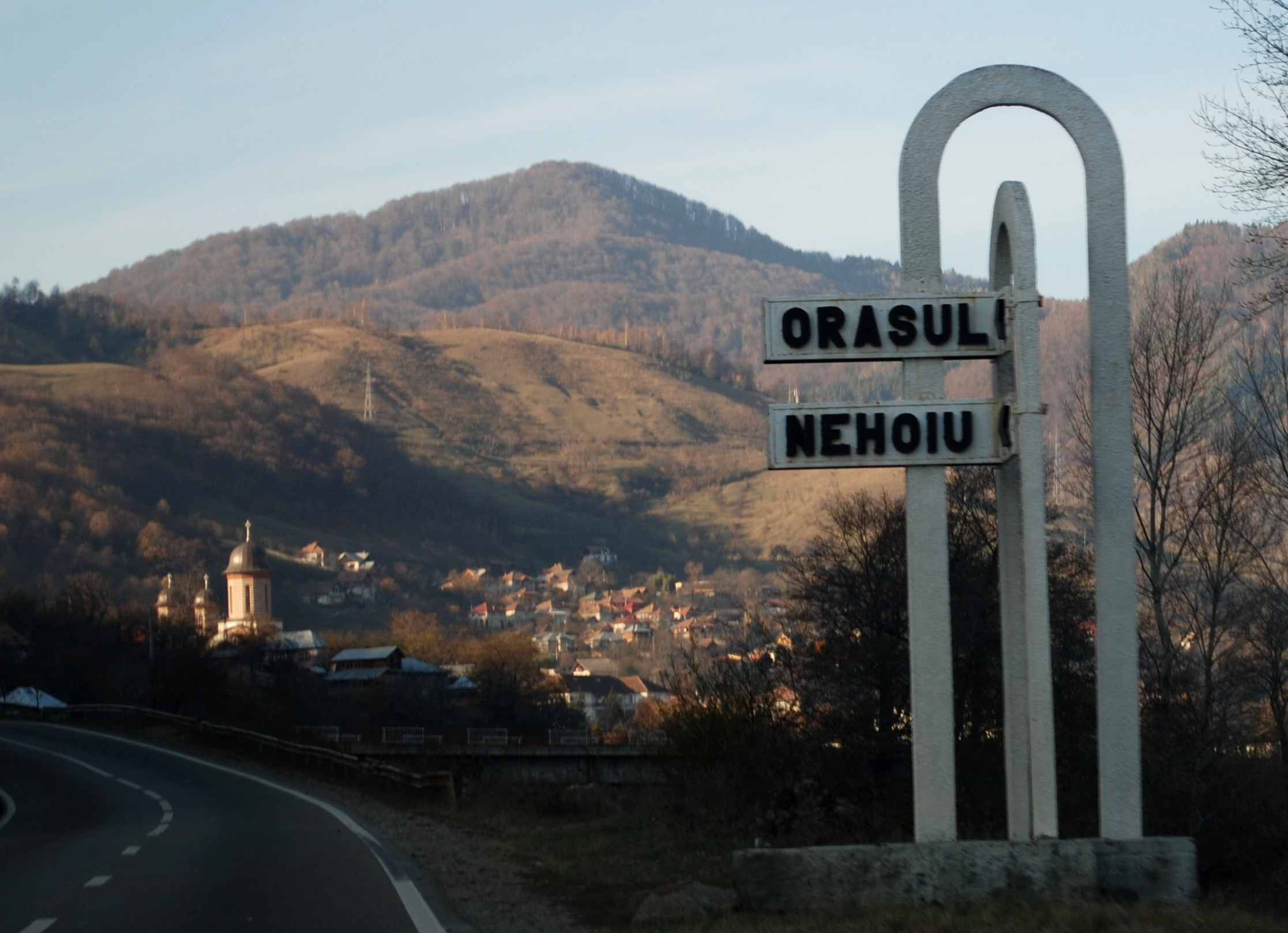
- Nehoiu, seen from the road to Buzău

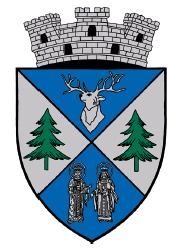
- Coat of arms

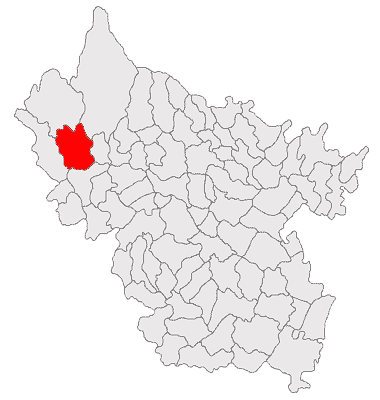
- Location in Buzău County

- Location in Romania
- Coordinates: 45°21′11″N 26°18′18″E
- Country: Romania
- County: Buzău

Government
  - Mayor (2024–2028): Ionuț Milea (PSD)
- Area: 91 km^{2} (35 sq mi)
- Elevation: 450 m (1,480 ft)
- Population (2021-12-01): 9,464
  - Density: 100/km^{2} (270/sq mi)
- Time zone: UTC+02:00 (EET)
  - Summer (DST): UTC+03:00 (EEST)
- Postal code: 125100
- Area code: (+40) 02 38
- Vehicle reg.: BZ
- Website: www.primaria-nehoiu.ro

Nehoiu (Romanian pronunciation: [neˈhoju]) is a town in Buzău County, Muntenia, Romania, with a population of 9,464 as of 2021. Wood processing is the local main economic activity. The town has a lumbermill since the early 20th century. It officially became a town in 1989, as a result of the Romanian rural systematization program.

The town administers nine villages: Bâsca Rozilei, Chirlești, Curmătura, Lunca Priporului, Mlăjet, Nehoiașu, Păltineni, Stănila, and Vinețișu.

Nehoiu is located in the northwestern part of the county, 72 km (45 mi) from the county seat, Buzău. It lies in a hilly area at the foot of the Curvature Carpathians, on the banks of the Buzău River.

The town is traversed by national road DN10, which crosses the Carpathians, joining Buzău to Brașov. The train station in Nehoiașu is the terminus for the CFR Line 504, which starts in Buzău.

== Natives ==
- Daniel Alexandru David (born 1983), footballer.
- Mariana Solomon (born 1980), triple jumper.
