= Curvature Sub Carpathians =

The Curvature Sub-Carpathians (Romanian: Subcarpații de Curbură), are a hilly region in central Romania, bordering the Curvature Carpathians. The range of high hills (800–900 m), with knolls and parallel ridges (Măgura Odobești), which separate two geological depressions are located between the Trotuș and Slănic rivers in Romania.

== See also ==
- Romanian Carpathians
