= Comandău =

Comandău Komandó
- Commune
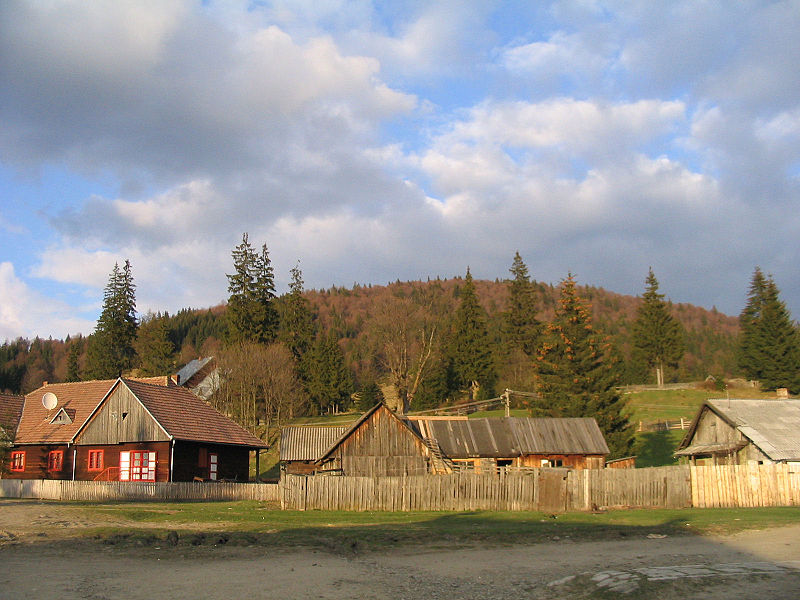

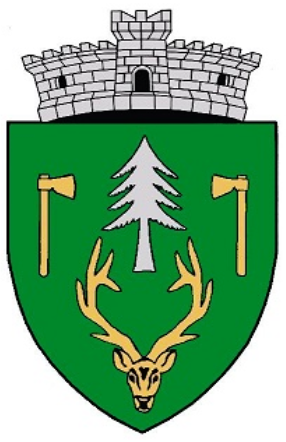
- Coat of arms

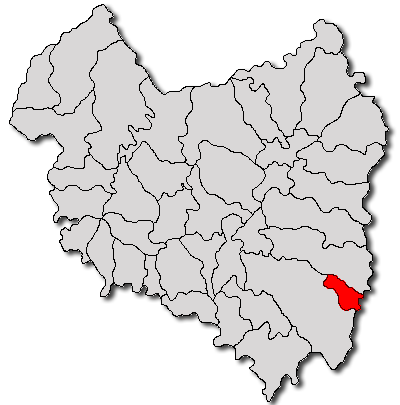
- Location in Covasna County

- Location in Romania
- Coordinates: 45°46′N 26°16′E
- Country: Romania
- County: Covasna

Government
  - Mayor (2020–2024): Béla Kocsis (UDMR)
- Area: 18.35 km^{2} (7.08 sq mi)
- Elevation: 1,017 m (3,337 ft)
- Population (2021-12-01): 822
  - Density: 44.8/km^{2} (116/sq mi)
- Time zone: UTC+02:00 (EET)
  - Summer (DST): UTC+03:00 (EEST)
- Postal code: 527080
- Area code: (+40) 02 67
- Vehicle reg.: CV
- Website: www.kommando.ro

Comandău (Hungarian: Komandó, Hungarian pronunciation: [ˈkommɒndoː]) is a commune in Covasna County, Transylvania, Romania. It is composed of a single village, Comandău.

The village formed part of the Székely Land region of the historical Transylvania province.

It served as a filming location for season three of the comedy spy-thriller Killing Eve.'

== Demographics ==
Historical population
Year	Pop.	±%
1910	1,917	—
1992	1,120	−41.6%
2002	1,042	−7.0%
2011	1,006	−3.5%
2021	822	−18.3%
Source: Census data

The commune has an absolute Székely Hungarian majority. According to the 2011 census, it had a population of 1,006, of which 93.24% were Hungarians and 5.17% Romanians. At the 2021 census, Comandău had a population of 822, of which 88.93% were Hungarians and 7.91% Romanians.
