= Buzău Mountains =

Mountain ranges in Romania

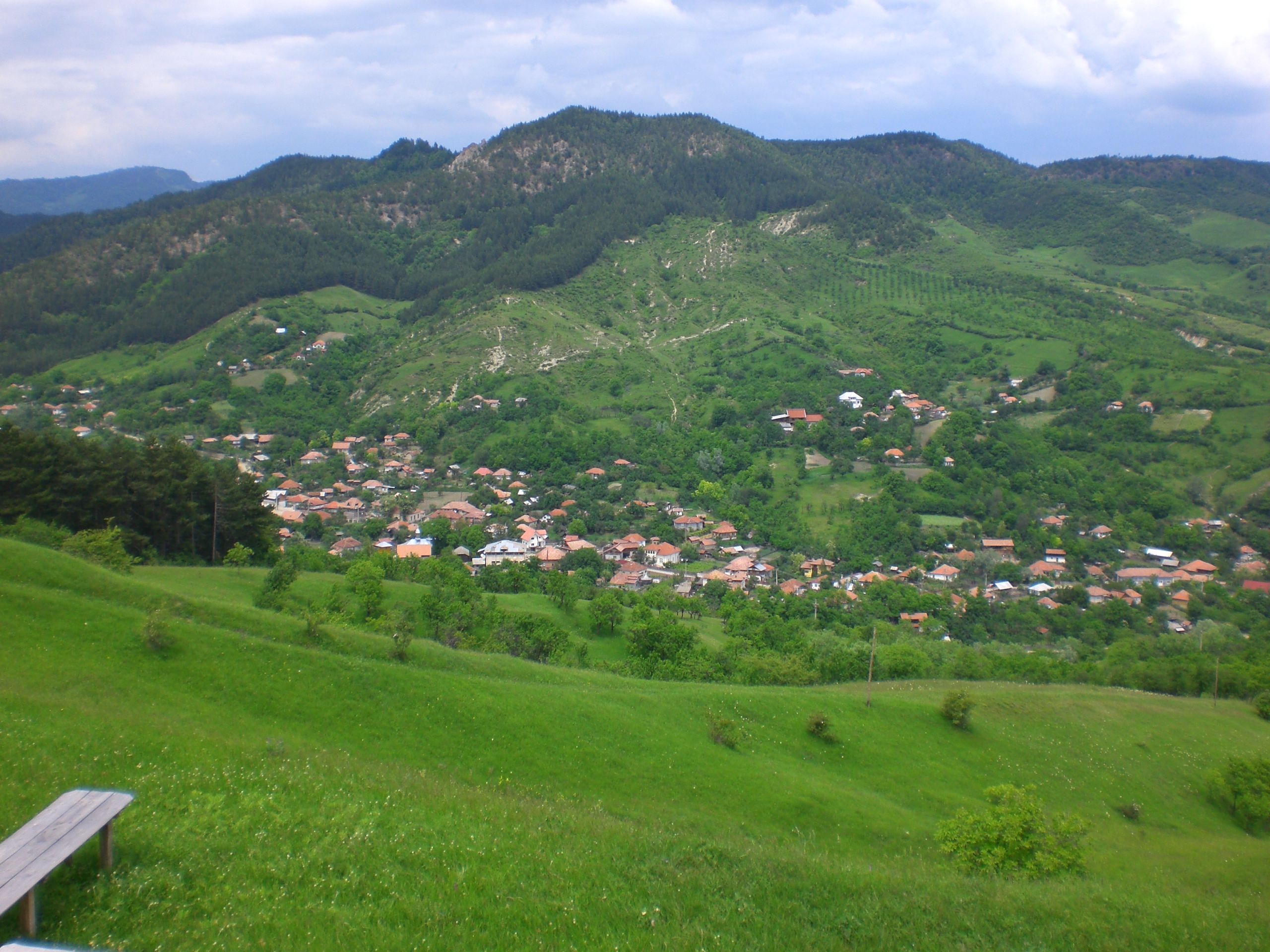
- The commune of Brăești, Buzău, in the Buzău Mountains

Highest point
- Peak: Penteleu Peak
- Elevation: 1,772 m (5,814 ft)

Naming
- Native name: Munții Buzăului (Romanian)

Geography
- Location: Romania
- Counties: Buzău, Covasna, Brașov
- Parent range: Moldavian-Muntenian Carpathians

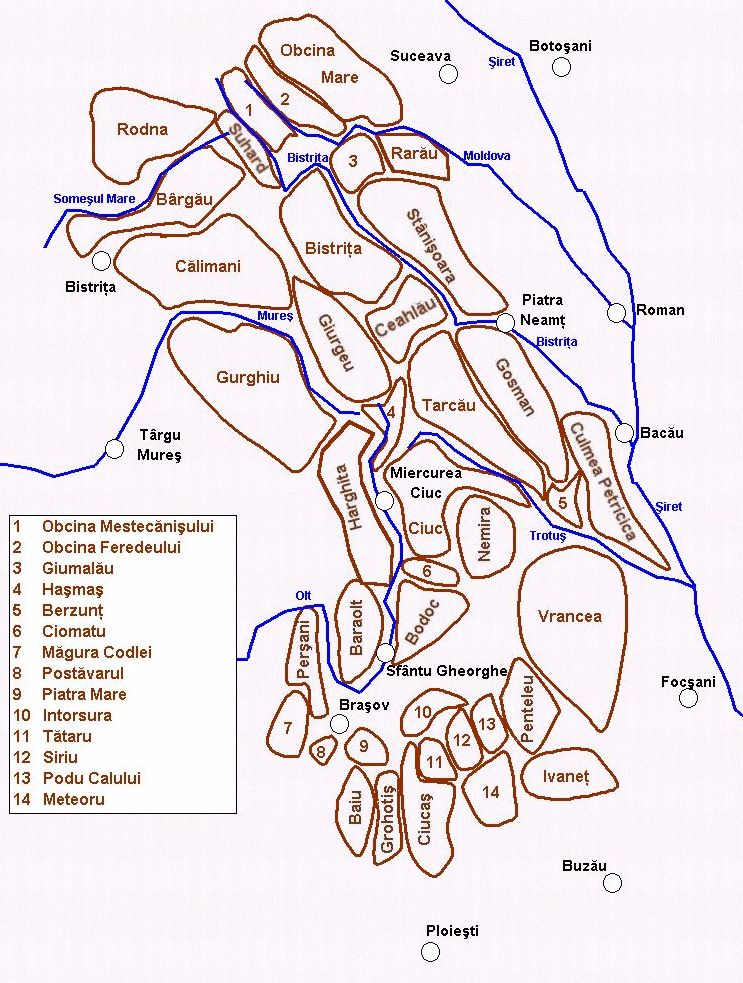
Map of the Eastern Carpathians, with the Buzău Mountains at the extreme south

The Buzău Mountains are a set of six mountain ranges in Romania which are part of the Curvature Carpathians region of the Outer Eastern Carpathians.

These six mountain ranges are as follows:

- Penteleu Massif
- Siriu Massif
- Tătaru Mountains
- Podu Calului Massif
- Monteoru Mountains
- Ivănețu Massif.

The Penteleu and Ivănețu Massifs are to the east, and border the Vrancea Mountains. The Podu Calului and Siriu Massifs are to the north, separated from the Întorsurii Mountains by the Întorsura Buzăului Depression, while the Ivănețu Massif is to the south. Finally, the Tătaru Mountains are to the west, abutting the Ciucaș Mountains.

The highest peaks in the Buzău Mountains are:

- Penteleu Peak, Penteleu Massif, 1,772 metres (5,814 ft)
- Mălaia Peak, Siriu Massif, 1,662 metres (5,453 ft)
- Tătaru Mare, Tătaru Mountains, 1,476 m (4,843 ft)
- Vârful lui Crai, Tătaru Mountains, 1,473 m (4,833 ft)
- Podu Calului Peak, Podu Calului Massif, 1,439 m (4,721 ft)
- Ivănețu Peak, Ivănețu Massif, 1,191 metres (3,907 ft).

These mountains are crossed by the Buzău Pass, which follows the Buzău River and connects Brașov with Buzău. Lake Siriu is an artificial dam lake on the river, at the southern end of the pass. Lacul Vulturilor is a periglacial lake located near Siriu, at an altitude of 1,420 m (4,660 ft).

The surrounding area offers vineyards, camping and hiking as visitor attractions. Rockfalls, mudslides and other seismic activity are not uncommon in the area.

== Gallery ==
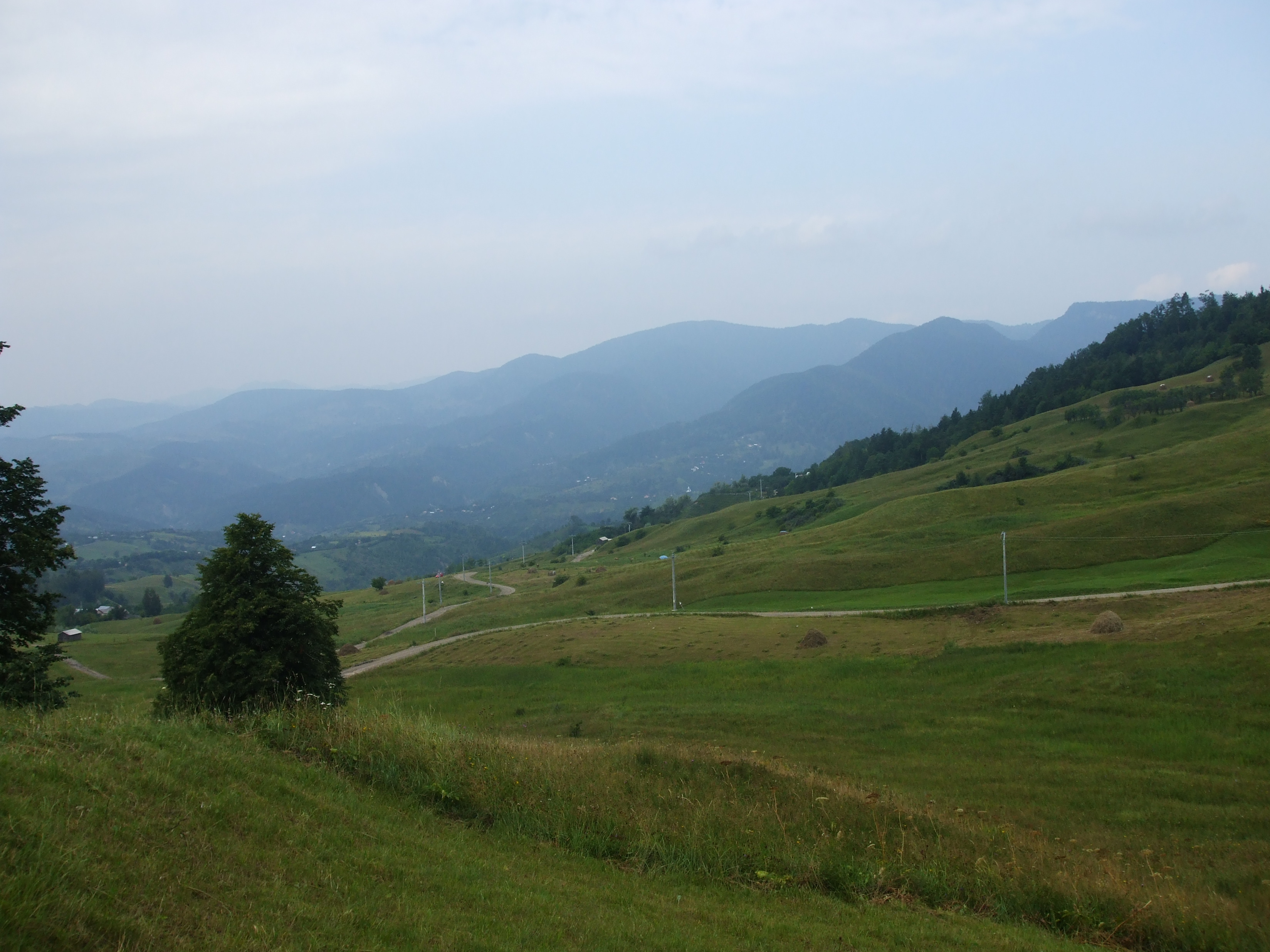
Bisoca

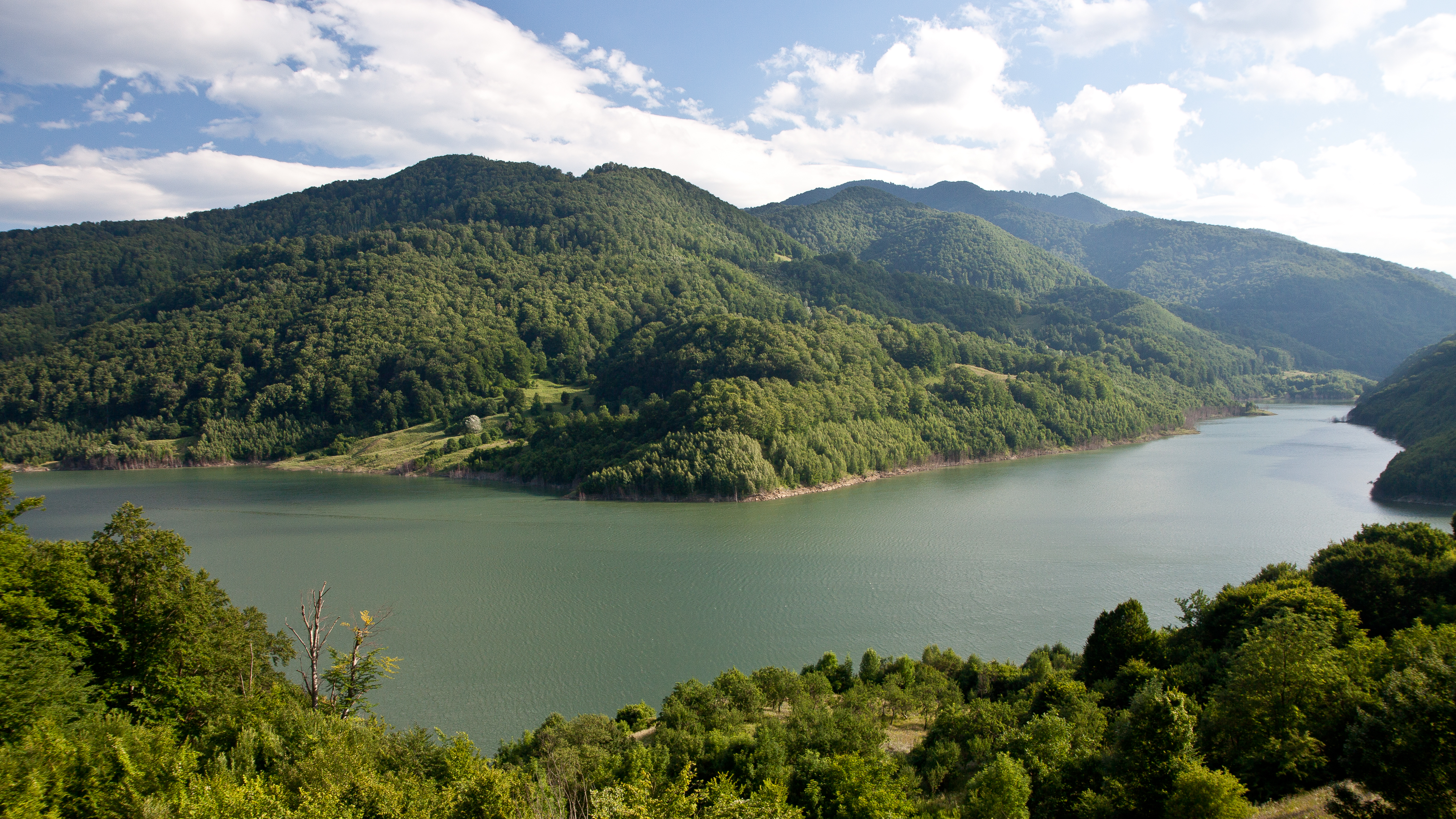
Siriu Lake

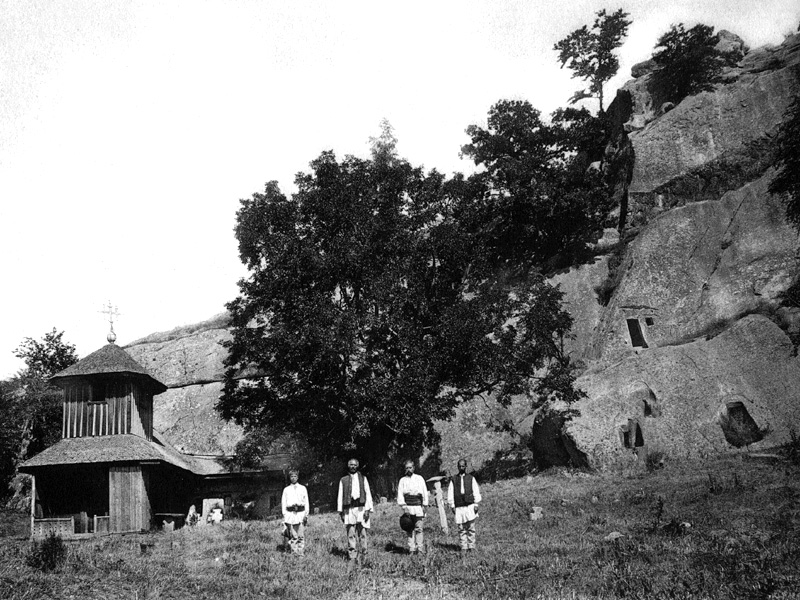
Aluniș hermitage caves

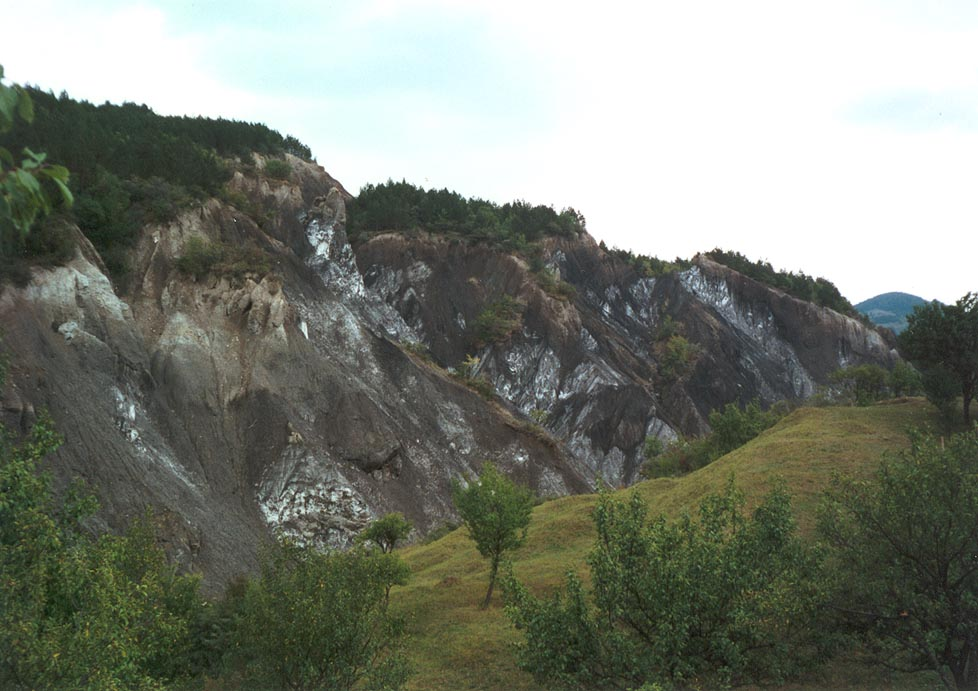
Meledic plateau

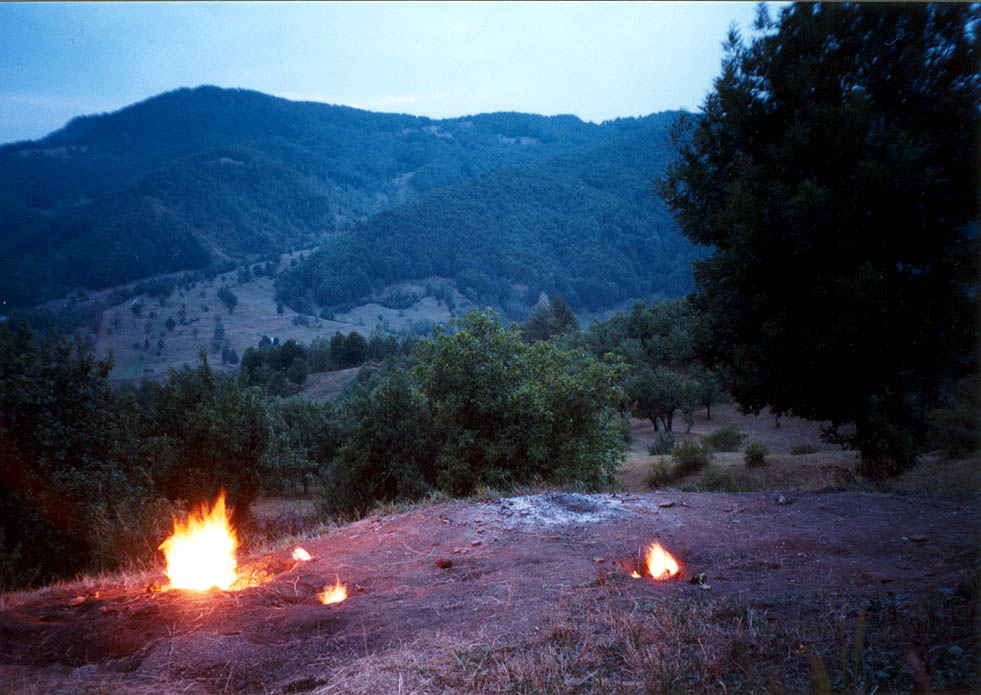
Focul Viu (Living Fires)

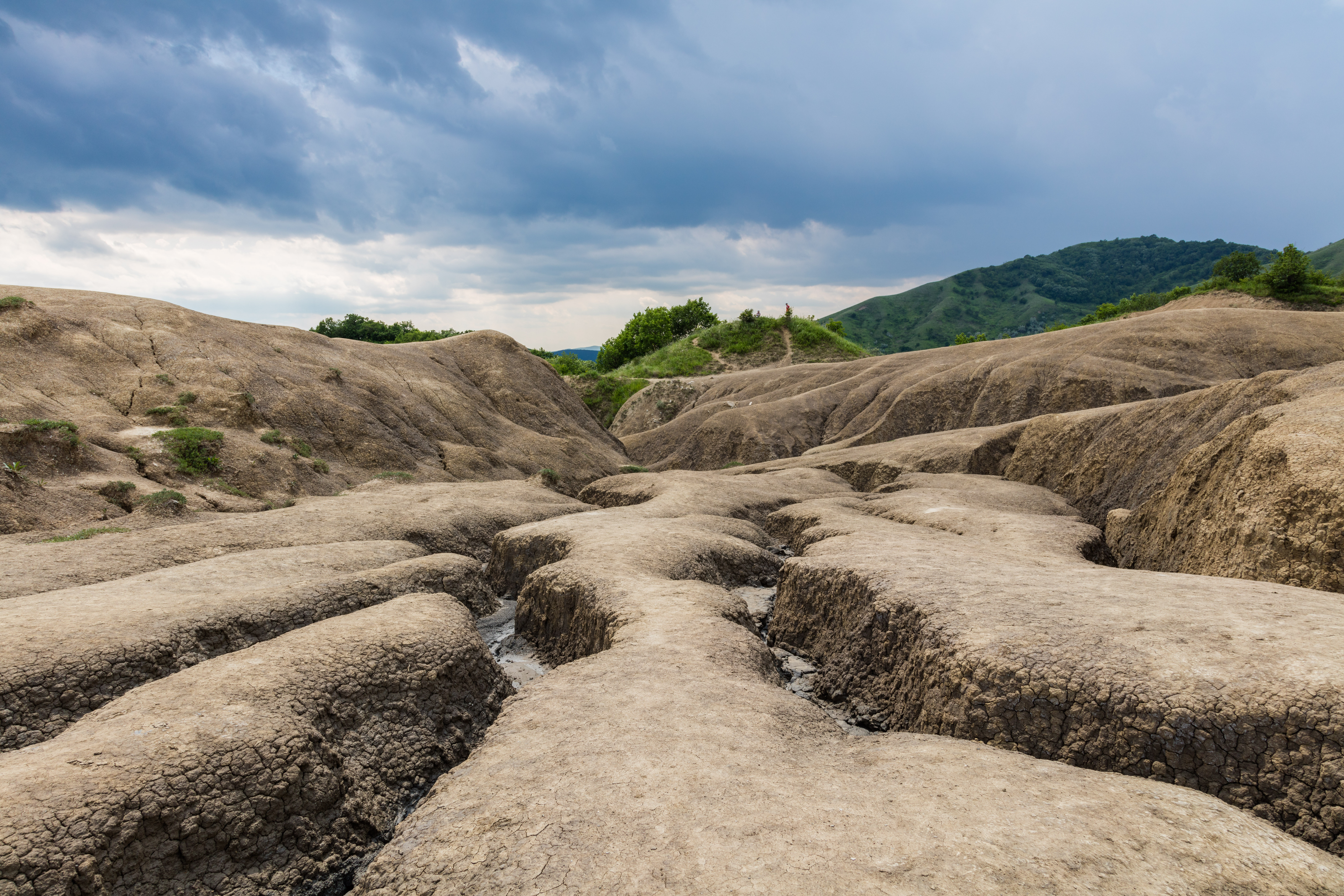
Mud Volcanoes

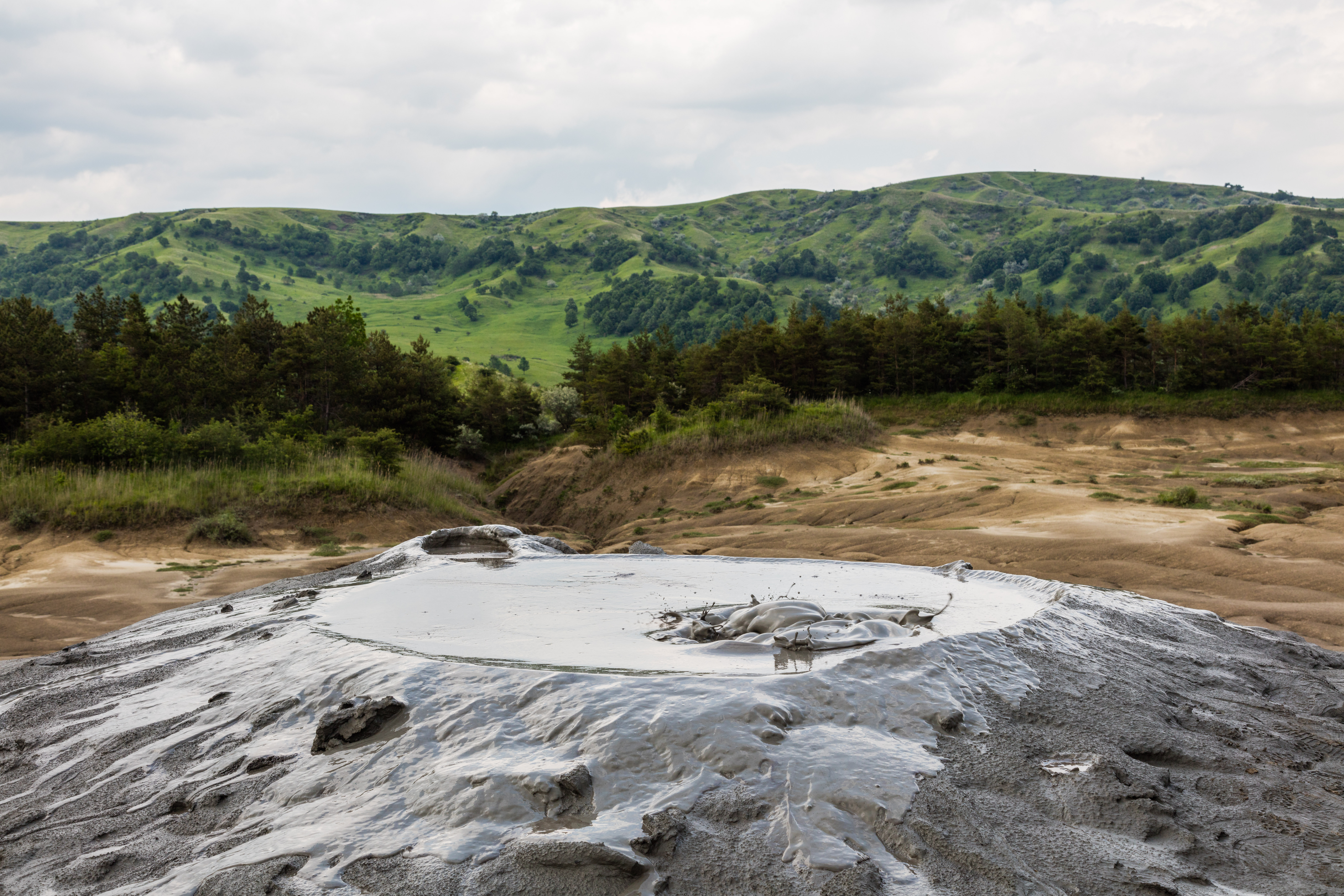

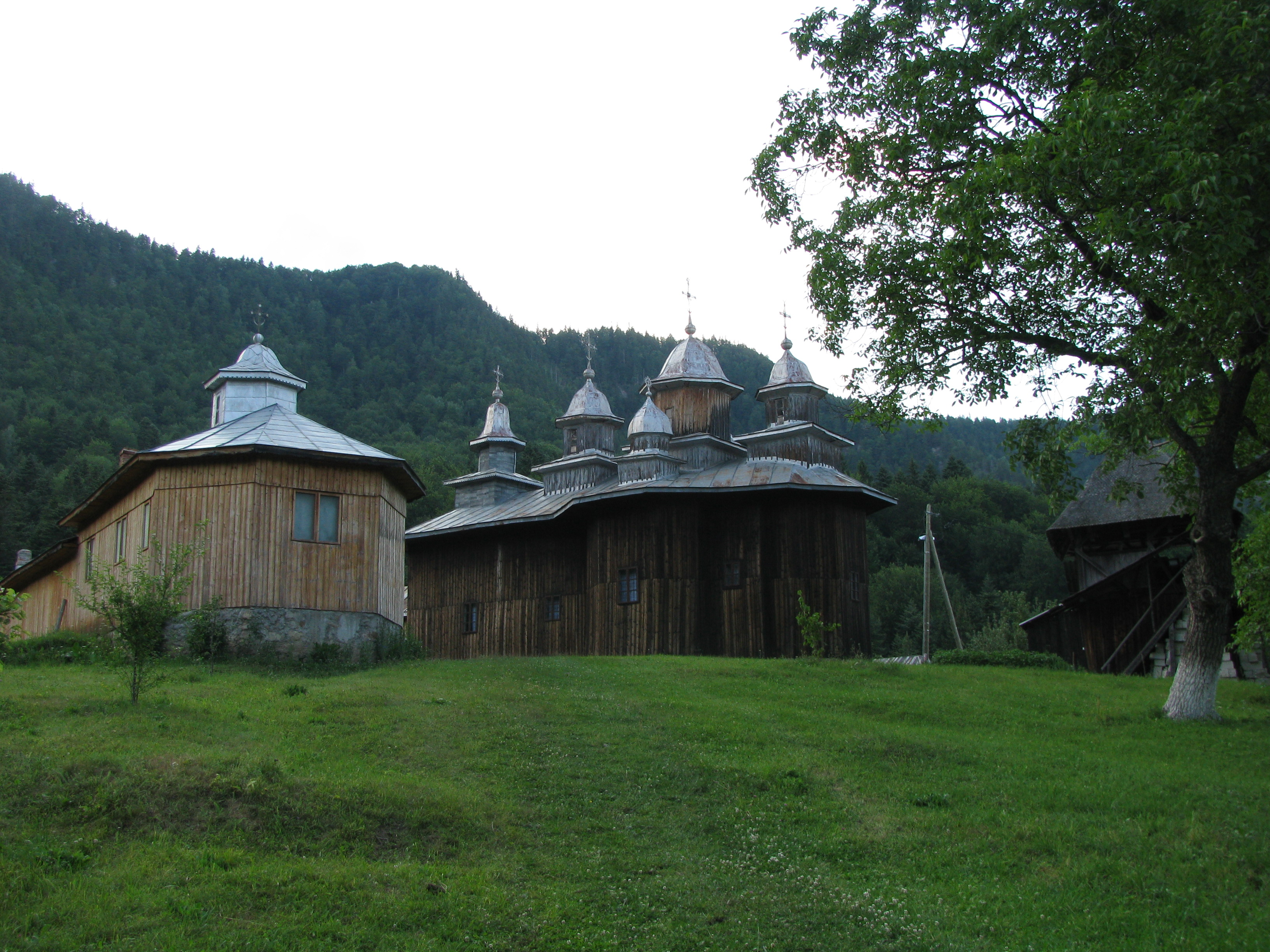
Găvanu wooden church

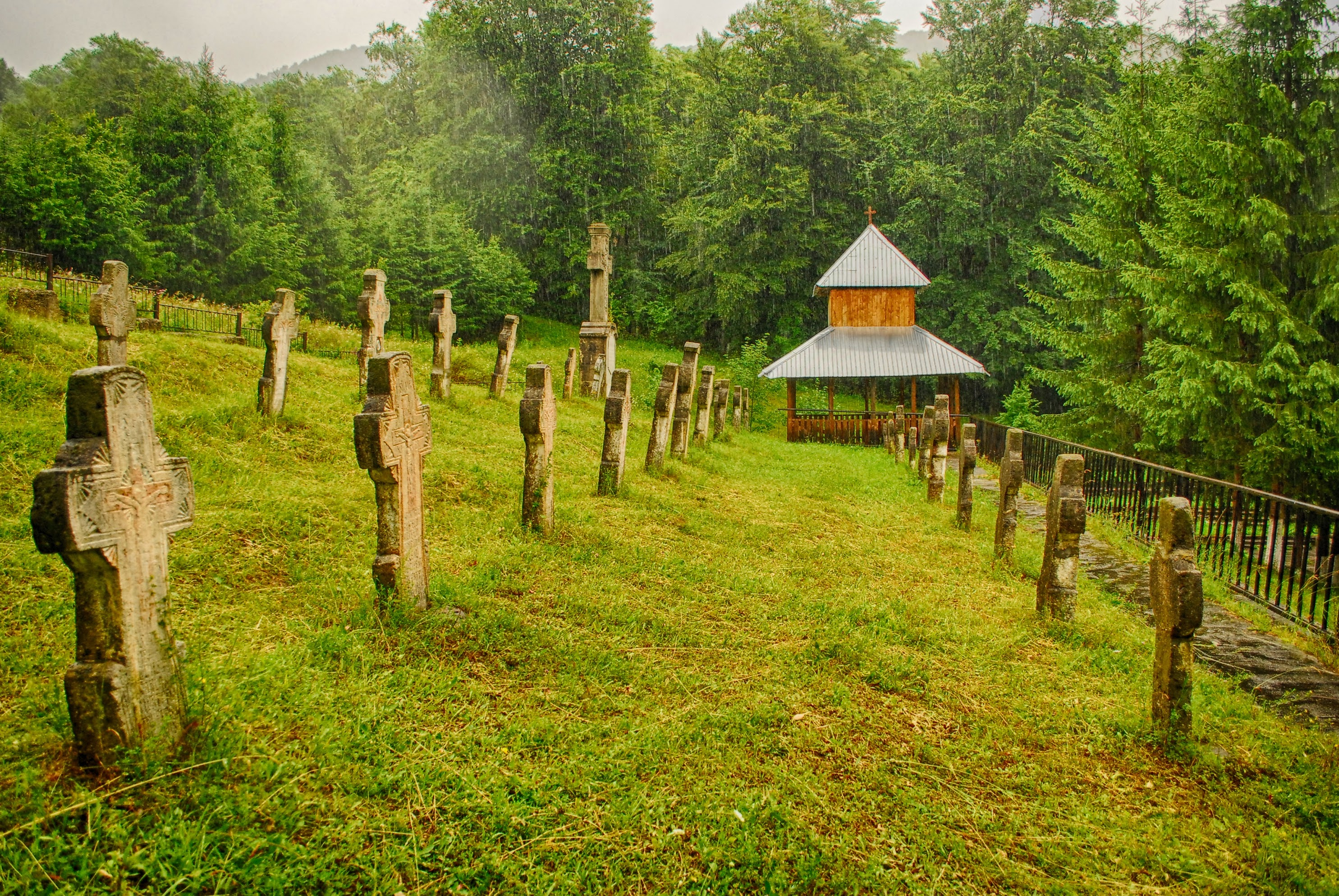
World War I Heroes cemetery
